= 1976 Kansas City Chiefs season =

NFL team season

- Owner: Lamar Hunt
- General manager: Jim Schaaf
- Head coach: Paul Wiggin
- Home stadium: Arrowhead Stadium

Results
- Record: 5–9
- Division place: 4th AFC West
- Playoffs: Did not qualify
- All-Pros: None
- Pro Bowlers: 1: C Jack Rudnay

The 1976 Kansas City Chiefs season was the franchise's seventh season in the National Football League, the fourteenth as the Kansas City Chiefs, and the seventeenth overall. It ended with a third consecutive 5–9 record and the Chiefs missed the playoffs for the fifth consecutive season.

Buck Buchanan announced his retirement in February, while Len Dawson announced his own departure on May 1. Off the field, Jack Steadman was promoted to team president and Jim Schaaf was named general manager in August. On the field, Kansas City's fortunes didn't improve in the second year of the Wiggin regime. The club dropped three straight home games, including an embarrassing 27–17 loss in week 3 to the New Orleans Saints, the first win with the Saints for former Kansas City coach Hank Stram (who refused to shake hands with Wiggin following the game and rode off on the shoulders of his players as he did after the Chiefs' victory in Super Bowl IV) before suffering a 50–17 setback at Buffalo on October 3, opening the season at 0–4 for the first time in team history. The team registered a 3–1 record during a successful midseason stretch, but like most preceding seasons, could not maintain that momentum.

After lingering in Len Dawson's shadow for eight seasons, Mike Livingston was firmly entrenched as the team's starting quarterback, becoming the first QB to start every regular season game since Dawson in 1968. Although Livingston played well and rallied the squad for wins in two of the season's final three games, the Chiefs still ended the year with their third consecutive 5–9 record. Running back MacArthur Lane was the club's top offensive threat, becoming the only player at the time in franchise history to lead the league in receptions (66).

== Offseason ==
=== 1976 expansion draft ===
Kansas City Chiefs selected during the expansion draft
Round	Overall	Name	Position	Expansion team
0	0	Rocky Rasley	Guard	Seattle Seahawks
0	0	Jim Kearney	Safety	Tampa Bay Buccaneers
0	0	Lawrence Williams	Wide Receiver	Tampa Bay Buccaneers

=== NFL draft ===
1976 Kansas City Chiefs draft
Round	Pick	Player	Position	College	Notes
1	15	Rod Walters	Guard	Iowa	
2	41	Cliff Frazier	Defensive tackle	UCLA	
3	63	Keith Simons	Defensive tackle	Minnesota	
3	74	Gary Barbaro *	Safety	Nicholls State	
3	79	Henry Marshall	Wide receiver	Missouri	
5	137	Willie Lee	Defensive tackle	Bethune-Cookman	
5	144	Jimbo Elrod	Linebacker	Oklahoma	
6	166	Steve Taylor	Safety	Kansas	
6	167	Bob Gregolunas	Linebacker	Northern Illinois	
7	172	Calvin Harper	Offensive tackle	Illinois State	
7	196	Rod Wellington	Running back	Iowa	
8	222	Orrin Olsen	Center	BYU	
9	249	Tim Collier	Cornerback	East Texas State	
10	277	Whitney Paul	Defensive end	Colorado	
11	304	Bob Squires	Tight end	Hastings	
12	331	Harold Porter	Wide receiver	Southwestern Louisiana	
13	361	Joe Bruner	Quarterback	Northeast Louisiana	
14	388	Rick Thurman	Offensive tackle	Texas	
15	415	Dave Rozumek	Linebacker	New Hampshire	
16	445	Dennis Anderson	Punter	Arizona	
17	472	Pat McNeil	Running back	Baylor	
Made roster * Made at least one Pro Bowl during career

== Roster ==
1976 Kansas City Chiefs roster
Quarterbacks (QB): 11 Tony Adams; 10 Mike Livingston; 7 Mike Nott; Running backs (RB): 21 Glynn Harrison; 42 MacArthur Lane; 45 Pat McNeil; 14 Ed Podolak; 21 Tommy Reamon; Wide receivers (WR): 83 Larry Brunson; 89 Henry Marshall; 85 Barry Pearson; 80 Lawrence Williams; Tight ends (TE): 84 Billy Masters; 88 Walter White	Offensive linemen (OL): 56 Charlie Ane C; 71 Ed Budde G; 65 Tom Condon G; 77 Charlie Getty G/T; 60 Matt Herkenhoff T; 70 Jim Nicholson T; 52 Orrin Olsen C/G; 58 Jack Rudnay C; 76 Rod Walters G; Defensive linemen (DL): 74 Larry Estes DE; 78 Willie Lee DT; 87 John Lohmeyer DE/DT; 75 Bob Maddox DT; 64 Whitney Paul DE; 73 Jim Wolf DT; 99 Wilbur Young DE	Linebackers (LB): 53 Billy Andrews OLB; 63 Willie Lanier MLB; 51 Jim Lynch OLB; 55 Dave Rozumek OLB; 54 Clyde Werner OLB; Defensive backs (DB): 25 Gary Barbaro FS; 37 Tim Collier CB; 46 Tim Gray SS; 15 Kerry Reardon CB; 48 Steve Taylor SS; 18 Emmitt Thomas CB; Special teams (ST): 3 Jan Stenerud K; 44 Jerrel Wilson P	Reserve: -- Randy Beisler G (IR); -- Steve Bograkos S (IR); 57 Jimbo Elrod LB (IR); 27 Woody Green RB (IR); -- J. J. Jennings RB (IR); -- Ike McBee WR (IR); 72 Keith Simons DT (IR); Rookies in italics

== Preseason ==
Week	Date	Opponent	Result	Record	Venue	Attendance	Recap
1	August 2	Houston Oilers	W 9–3 (OT)	1–0	Arrowhead Stadium	30,006	Recap
2	August 7	Minnesota Vikings	L 10–13	1–1	Arrowhead Stadium	32,851	Recap
3	August 15	at San Francisco 49ers	L 13–21	1–2	Candlestick Park	36,101	Recap
4	August 21	Washington Redskins	W 23–20	2–2	Arrowhead Stadium	30,014	Recap
5	August 28	Detroit Lions	L 21–23	2–3	Arrowhead Stadium	27,410	Recap
6	September 3	at St. Louis Cardinals	L 14–31	2–4	Busch Memorial Stadium	42,997	Recap

== Regular season ==
=== Schedule ===
Week	Date	Opponent	Result	Record	Venue	Attendance	Recap
1	September 12	**San Diego Chargers**	**L** 16–30	0–1	Arrowhead Stadium	53,133	Recap
2	September 20	**Oakland Raiders**	**L** 21–24	0–2	Arrowhead Stadium	60,884	Recap
3	September 26	New Orleans Saints	**L** 17–27	0–3	Arrowhead Stadium	53,918	Recap
4	October 3	at Buffalo Bills	**L** 17–50	0–4	Rich Stadium	51,909	Recap
5	October 10	at Washington Redskins	**W** 33–30	1–4	RFK Stadium	53,060	Recap
6	October 17	at Miami Dolphins	**W** 20–17 (OT)	2–4	Miami Orange Bowl	43,325	Recap
7	October 24	**Denver Broncos**	**L** 26–35	2–5	Arrowhead Stadium	57,961	Recap
8	October 31	at **Tampa Bay Buccaneers**	**W** 28–19	3–5	Tampa Stadium	41,779	Recap
9	November 7	Pittsburgh Steelers	**L** 0–45	3–6	Arrowhead Stadium	71,516	Recap
10	November 14	at **Oakland Raiders**	**L** 10–21	3–7	Oakland–Alameda County Coliseum	48,259	Recap
11	November 21	Cincinnati Bengals	**L** 24–27	3–8	Arrowhead Stadium	46,259	Recap
12	November 28	at **San Diego Chargers**	**W** 23–20	4–8	San Diego Stadium	29,272	Recap
13	December 5	at **Denver Broncos**	**L** 16–17	4–9	Mile High Stadium	58,170	Recap
14	December 12	Cleveland Browns	**W** 39–14	5–9	Arrowhead Stadium	34,340	Recap
Note: Intra-division opponents are in **bold** text.

=== Game summaries ===
==== Week 1: vs. San Diego Chargers ====
Week 1: San Diego Chargers at Kansas City Chiefs – Game summary

Quarter	1	2	3	4	Total
**Chargers**	6	7	14	3	**30**
Chiefs	6	10	0	0	**16**

at Arrowhead Stadium, Kansas City, Missouri

- Date: September 12
- Game time: 1:00 p.m. CDT
- Game weather: Sunny, 85 °F (29 °C)
- Game attendance: 53,133
- Referee: Bob Frederic
- TV announcers (NBC): Jack Buck and Len Dawson
- Box score

Game information

**First quarter**

- SD – Rickey Young 1-yard run (kick blocked), 9:25. Chargers 6–0. **Drive: 9 plays, 80 yards, 3:51.**
- KC – Walter White 8 yard pass from Mike Livingston (kick blocked), 2:43. Tied 6–6. **Drive: 3 plays, 6 yards, 0:47.**

**Second quarter**

- KC – Jan Stenerud 28-yard field goal, 3:57. Chiefs 9–6. **Drive: 14 plays, 66 yards, 6:04.**
- SD – Charlie Joiner 3-yard pass from Dan Fouts (Toni Fritsch kick), 1:48. Chargers 13–9. **Drive: 6 plays, 67 yards, 2:09.**
- KC – Billy Masters 10-yard pass from Mike Livingston (Jan Stenerud kick), 0:32. Chiefs 16–13. **Drive: 7 plays, 71 yards, 1:16.**

**Third quarter**

- SD – Sam Scarber 2-yard run (Toni Fritsch kick), 11:20. Chargers 20–16. **Drive: 9 plays, 74 yards, 3:40.**
- SD – Gary Garrison 22-yard pass from Dan Fouts (Toni Fritsch kick), 0:43. Chargers 27–16. **Drive: 12 plays, 86 yards, 4:17.**

**Fourth quarter**

- SD – Toni Fritsch 37-yard field goal, 14:15. Chargers 30–16. **Drive: 4 plays, 5 yards, 1:05.**

Top passers

- SD – Dan Fouts – 17/30, 205 yards, 2 TD
- KC – Mike Livingston – 20/34, 236 yards, 2 TD, 3 INT

Top rushers

- SD – Rickey Young – 14 rushes, 76 yards, TD
- KC – Woody Green – 12 rushes, 62 yards

Top receivers

- SD – Charlie Joiner – 4 receptions, 59 yards, TD
- KC – Billy Masters – 4 receptions, 79 yards, TD

==== Week 2: vs. Oakland Raiders ====
Week 2: Oakland Raiders at Kansas City Chiefs – Game summary

Quarter	1	2	3	4	Total
**Raiders**	7	10	0	7	**24**
Chiefs	0	0	7	14	**21**

at Arrowhead Stadium, Kansas City, Missouri

- Date: September 20
- Game time: 8:00 p.m. CDT
- Game weather: Clear, 64 °F (18 °C)
- Game attendance: 60,884
- Referee: Ben Dreith
- TV announcers (ABC): Frank Gifford, Alex Karras and Howard Cosell
- Box score

Game information

**First quarter**

- OAK – Dave Casper 15-yard pass from Ken Stabler (Fred Steinfort kick), 3:23. Raiders 7–0. **Drive: 12 plays, 67 yards, 6:03.**

**Second quarter**

- OAK – Cliff Branch 10-yard pass from Ken Stabler (Fred Steinfort kick), 10:32. Raiders 14–0. **Drive: 12 plays, 72 yards, 5:36.**
- OAK – Fred Steinfort 37-yard field goal, 0:17. Raiders 17–0. **Drive: 11 plays, 67 yards, 2:43.**

**Third quarter**

- KC – MacArthur Lane 1-yard run (Jan Stenerud kick), 1:45. Raiders 17–7. **Drive: 9 plays, 54 yards, 3:23.**

**Fourth quarter**

- OAK – Mike Siani 14-yard pass from Ken Stabler (Fred Steinfort kick), 12:51. Raiders 24–7. **Drive: 8 plays, 72 yards, 3:44.**
- KC – Mike Livingston 1-yard run (Jan Stenerud kick), 4:36. Raiders 24–14. **Drive: 12 plays, 87 yards, 4:05.**
- KC – Billy Masters 25-yard pass from Mike Livingston (Jan Stenerud kick), 2:53. Raiders 24–21. **Drive: 1 play, 25 yards, 0:08.**

Top passers

- OAK – Ken Stabler – 22/28, 224 yards, 3 TD, INT
- KC – Mike Livingston – 12/21, 190 yards, TD

Top rushers

- OAK – Mark van Eeghen – 19 rushes, 84 yards
- KC – Woody Green – 14 rushes, 75 yards

Top receivers

- OAK – Cliff Branch – 5 receptions, 62 yards, TD
- KC – MacArthur Lane – 4 receptions, 69 yards

==== Week 3: vs. New Orleans Saints ====
Week 3: New Orleans Saints at Kansas City Chiefs – Game summary

Quarter	1	2	3	4	Total
**Saints**	7	3	0	17	**27**
Chiefs	7	7	3	0	**17**

at Arrowhead Stadium, Kansas City, Missouri

- Date: September 26
- Game time: 1:00 p.m. CDT
- Game weather: Overcast, 63 °F (17 °C)
- Game attendance: 53,918
- Referee: Don Wedge
- TV announcers (CBS): Lindsey Nelson and Alex Hawkins
- Box score

Game information

**First quarter**

- KC – Woody Green 3-yard run (Jan Stenerud kick), 11:27. Chiefs 7–0. **Drive: 7 plays, 59 yards, 3:33.**
- NO – Tony Galbreath 74-yard run (Rich Szaro kick), 4:08. Tied 7–7. **Drive: 4 plays, 79 yards, 3:01.**

**Second quarter**

- NO – Rich Szaro 26-yard field goal, 10:35. Saints 10–7. **Drive: 11 plays, 82 yards, 4:50.**
- KC – Henry Marshall 20-yard pass from Mike Livingston (Jan Stenerud kick), 1:56. Chiefs 14–10. **Drive: 5 plays, 46 yards, 1:52.**

**Third quarter**

- KC – Jan Stenerud 27-yard field goal, 6:47. Chiefs 17–10. **Drive: 9 plays, 54 yards, 5:21.**

**Fourth quarter**

- NO – Rich Szaro 27-yard field goal, 6:45. Chiefs 17–13. **Drive: 10 plays, 53 yards, 5:08.**
- NO – Tony Galbreath 9-yard run (Rich Szaro kick), 2:28. Saints 20–17. **Drive: 4 plays, 69 yards, 1:30.**
- NO – Henry Childs 2-yard pass from Bobby Scott (Rich Szaro kick), 0:08. Saints 27–17. **Drive: 4 plays, 21 yards, 1:15.**

Top passers

- NO – Bobby Scott – 12/21, 126 yards, TD, 2 INT
- KC – Mike Livingston – 10/17, 149 yards, TD

Top rushers

- NO – Tony Galbreath – 14 rushes, 146 yards, 2 TD
- KC – Woody Green – 20 rushes, 82 yards, TD

Top receivers

- NO – Don Herrmann – 1 reception, 57 yards
- KC – Henry Marshall – 4 receptions, 75 yards, TD

==== Week 4: at Buffalo Bills ====
Week 4: Kansas City Chiefs at Buffalo Bills – Game summary

Quarter	1	2	3	4	Total
Chiefs	0	10	7	0	**17**
**Bills**	16	7	7	20	**50**

at Rich Stadium, Orchard Park, New York

- Date: October 3
- Game time: 1:00 p.m. EDT
- Game weather: Sunny, 64 °F (18 °C)
- Game attendance: 51,909
- Referee: Chuck Heberling
- TV announcers (NBC): Ross Porter and Mike Haffner
- Box score

Game information

**First quarter**

- BUF – George Jakowenko 30-yard field goal. Bills 3–0. **Drive: 9 plays, 60 yards, 4:39.**
- BUF – Bob Chandler 1-yard pass from Joe Ferguson (George Jakowenko kick), 7:24. Bills 10–0. **Drive: 3 plays, 4 yards, 1:16.**
- BUF – Bob Chandler 5-yard pass from Joe Ferguson (kick blocked), 3:24. Bills 16–0. **Drive: 7 plays, 87 yards, 2:22.**

**Second quarter**

- KC – Henry Marshall 31-yard pass from Tony Adams (Jan Stenerud kick), 13:39. Bills 16–7. **Drive: 9 plays, 72 yards, 4:35.**
- BUF – Bob Chandler 7-yard pass from Joe Ferguson (George Jakowenko kick), 1:56. Bills 23–7. **Drive: 7 plays, 37 yards, 2:18.**
- KC – Jan Stenerud 33-yard field goal, 0:43. Bills 23–10. **Drive: 8 plays, 53 yards, 1:13.**

**Third quarter**

- BUF – Jeff Kinney 1-yard run (George Jakowenko kick), 4:54. Bills 30–10. **Drive: 8 plays, 43 yards, 3:53.**
- KC – Tommy Reamon 49-yard pass from Tony Adams (Jan Stenerud kick), 3:56. Bills 30–17. **Drive: 3 plays, 61 yards, 0:58.**

**Fourth quarter**

- BUF – O. J. Simpson 1-yard run (kick failed, wide right), 11:15. Bills 36–17. **Drive: 6 plays, 51 yards.**
- BUF – O. J. Simpson 5-yard run (George Jakowenko kick), 1:17. Bills 43–17. **Drive: 8 plays, 61 yards, 4:26.**
- BUF – Tony Greene 101-yard interception return (George Jakowenko kick), 0:00. Bills 50–17.

Top passers

- KC – Tony Adams – 17/32, 319 yards, 2 TD, 3 INT
- BUF – Joe Ferguson – 14/24, 184 yards, 3 TD

Top rushers

- KC – Woody Green – 13 rushes, 58 yards
- BUF – O. J. Simpson – 24 rushes, 130 yards, 2 TD

Top receivers

- KC – Larry Brunson – 6 receptions, 106 yards
- BUF – Bob Chandler – 6 receptions, 59 yards, 3 TD

==== Week 5: at Washington Redskins ====
Week 5: Kansas City Chiefs at Washington Redskins – Game summary

Quarter	1	2	3	4	Total
**Chiefs**	6	10	7	10	**33**
Redskins	3	7	0	20	**30**

at RFK Stadium, Washington, D.C.

- Date: October 10
- Game time: 1:00 p.m. EDT
- Game weather: 59 °F (15 °C)
- Game attendance: 53,060
- Referee: Red Cashion
- TV announcers (NBC): Jack Buck and Len Dawson
- Box score

Game information

**First quarter**

- WAS – Mark Moseley 30-yard field goal, 9:30. Redskins 3–0. **Drive: 14 plays, 72 yards, 5:30.**
- KC – Jan Stenerud 37-yard field goal, 4:09. Tied 3–3. **Drive: 13 plays, 71 yards, 4:39.**
- KC – Jan Stenerud 52-yard field goal, 0:12. Chiefs 6–3. **Drive: 5 plays, 32 yards, 1:39.**

**Second quarter**

- KC – Jan Stenerud 38-yard field goal, 13:35. Chiefs 9–3. **Drive: 4 plays, 8 yards, 1:25.**
- WAS – Joe Theismann 1-yard run (Mark Moseley kick), 10:19. Redskins 10–9. **Drive: 7 plays, 67 yards, 3:16.**
- KC – Walter White 33-yard pass from Mike Livingston (Jan Stenerud kick), 0:33. Chiefs 16–10. **Drive: 6 plays, 80 yards, 1:12.**

**Third quarter**

- KC – MacArthur Lane 6-yard run (Jan Stenerud kick), 2:38. Chiefs 23–10. **Drive: 6 plays, 53 yards, 3:20.**

**Fourth quarter**

- WAS – Jerry Smith 5-yard pass from Joe Theismann (Mark Moseley kick), 14:49. Chiefs 23–17. **Drive: 10 plays, 69 yards, 2:49.**
- WAS – Frank Grant 37-yard pass from Joe Theismann (Mark Moseley kick), 12:27. Redskins 24–23. **Drive: 2 plays, 47 yards, 0:33.**
- KC – Jan Stenerud 45-yard field goal, 11:06. Chiefs 26–24. **Drive: 5 plays, 46 yards, 1:21.**
- WAS – John Riggins 6-yard run (kick failed), 2:50. Redskins 30–26. **Drive: 10 plays, 70 yards, 4:22.**
- KC – Larry Brunson 36-yard pass from Mike Livingston (Jan Stenerud kick), 1:04. Chiefs 33–30. **Drive: 4 plays, 82 yards, 1:46.**

Top passers

- KC – Mike Livingston – 15/29, 332 yards, 2 TD
- WAS – Joe Theismann – 20/37, 270 yards, 2 TD, 2 INT

Top rushers

- KC – MacArthur Lane – 18 rushes, 60 yards, TD
- WAS – Mike Thomas – 13 rushes, 83 yards

Top receivers

- KC – Larry Brunson – 5 receptions, 98 yards, TD
- WAS – Frank Grant – 8 receptions, 138 yards, TD

==== Week 6: at Miami Dolphins ====
Week 6: Kansas City Chiefs at Miami Dolphins – Game summary

Quarter	1	2	3	4	OT	Total
**Chiefs**	7	3	0	7	3	**20**
Dolphins	0	0	7	10	0	**17**

at Miami Orange Bowl, Miami, Florida

- Date: October 17
- Game time: 4:00 p.m. EDT
- Game weather: Partly Cloudy, 80 °F (27 °C)
- Game attendance: 43,325
- Referee: Pat Haggerty
- TV announcers (NBC): Jay Randolph and Mike Haffner
- Box score

Game information

**First quarter**

- KC – Tommy Reamon 1-yard run (Jan Stenerud kick), 7:47. Chiefs 7–0. **Drive: 8 plays, 39 yards, 4:28.**

**Second quarter**

- KC – Jan Stenerud 29-yard field goal, 7:57. Chiefs 10–0. **Drive: 4 plays, 6 yards, 1:28.**

**Third quarter**

- MIA – Norm Bulaich 2-yard run (Garo Yepremian kick), 2:25. Chiefs 10–7. **Drive: 9 plays, 71 yards, 5:23.**

**Fourth quarter**

- MIA – Howard Twilley 4-yard pass from Bob Griese (Garo Yepremian kick), 9:19. Dolphins 14–10. **Drive: 6 plays, 59 yards, 3:35.**
- KC – Henry Marshall 59-yard run (Jan Stenerud kick), 1:45. Chiefs 17–14. **Drive: 4 plays, 98 yards, 1:52.**
- MIA – Garo Yepremian 27-yard field goal, 0:09. Tied 17–17. **Drive: 8 plays, 63 yards, 1:36.**

**Overtime**

- KC – Jan Stenerud 34-yard field goal, 0:12. Chiefs 20–17. **Drive: 7 plays, 63 yards, 2:02.**

Top passers

- KC – Mike Livingston – 20/33, 267 yards, INT
- MIA – Bob Griese – 25/35, 306 yards, TD, 2 INT

Top rushers

- KC – Tommy Reamon – 16 rushes, 64 yards, TD
- MIA – Norm Bulaich – 20 rushes, 91 yards, TD

Top receivers

- KC – Ed Podolak – 6 receptions, 67 yards
- MIA – Nat Moore – 5 receptions, 106 yards

==== Week 7: vs. Denver Broncos ====
Week 7: Denver Broncos at Kansas City Chiefs – Game summary

Quarter	1	2	3	4	Total
**Broncos**	14	7	14	0	**35**
Chiefs	7	10	3	6	**26**

at Arrowhead Stadium, Kansas City, Missouri

- Date: October 24
- Game time: 3:00 p.m. CDT
- Game weather: Overcast, 43 °F (6 °C)
- Game attendance: 57,961
- Referee: Jim Tunney
- TV announcers (NBC): Jay Randolph and Floyd Little
- Box score

Game information

**First quarter**

- KC – Tommy Reamon 3-yard run (Jan Stenerud kick), 11:54. Chiefs 7–0. **Drive: 6 plays, 45 yards, 1:57.**
- DEN – Otis Armstrong 16-yard run (Jim Turner kick), 9:53. Tied 7–7. **Drive: 4 plays, 28 yards, 2:01.**
- DEN – Haven Moses 7-yard pass from Steve Ramsey (Jim Turner kick), 4:13. Broncos 14–7. **Drive: 7 plays, 85 yards, 3:56.**

**Second quarter**

- KC – Walter White 3-yard pass from Mike Livingston (Jan Stenerud kick), 14:22. Tied 14–14. **Drive: 11 plays, 69 yards, 4:51.**
- DEN – Rick Upchurch 55-yard punt return (Jim Turner kick), 8:47. Broncos 21–14.
- KC – Jan Stenerud 48-yard field goal, 0:00. Broncos 21–17. **Drive: 5 plays, 32 yards, 0:32.**

**Third quarter**

- DEN – Jon Keyworth 2-yard run (Jim Turner kick), 12:06. Broncos 28–17. **Drive: 6 plays, 58 yards, 2:54.**
- KC – Jan Stenerud 40-yard field goal, 8:57. Broncos 28–20. **Drive: 9 plays, 45 yards, 3:09.**
- DEN – Jack Dolbin 24-yard pass from Steve Ramsey (Jim Turner kick), 4:23. Broncos 35–20. **Drive: 9 plays, 52 yards, 4:23.**

**Fourth quarter**

- KC – MacArthur Lane 10-yard run (kick blocked), 1:43. Broncos 35–26. **Drive: 8 plays, 80 yards, 2:48.**

Top passers

- DEN – Steve Ramsey – 13/21, 175 yards, 2 TD, INT
- KC – Mike Livingston – 22/33, 290 yards, TD

Top rushers

- DEN – Otis Armstrong – 16 rushes, 101 yards, TD
- KC – Tommy Reamon – 22 rushes, 98 yards, TD

Top receivers

- DEN – Otis Armstrong – 6 receptions, 60 yards
- KC – Larry Brunson – 4 receptions, 85 yards

==== Week 8: at Tampa Bay Buccaneers ====
Week 8: Kansas City Chiefs at Tampa Bay Buccaneers – Game summary

Quarter	1	2	3	4	Total
**Chiefs**	3	3	14	8	**28**
Buccaneers	0	0	0	19	**19**

at Tampa Stadium, Tampa, Florida

- Date: October 31
- Game time: 1:00 p.m. EST
- Game weather: Cloudy, 70 °F (21 °C)
- Game attendance: 41,779
- Referee: Gene Barth
- TV announcers (NBC): Jay Randolph and Mike Haffner
- Box score

Game information

**First quarter**

- KC – Jan Stenerud 42-yard field goal, 9:13. Chiefs 3–0. **Drive: 11 plays, 33 yards, 5:47.**

**Second quarter**

- KC – Jan Stenerud 32-yard field goal, 12:11. Chiefs 6–0. **Drive: 9 plays, 35 yards, 5:07.**

**Third quarter**

- KC – Billy Masters 2-yard pass from Mike Livingston (Jan Stenerud kick), 13:22. Chiefs 13–0. **Drive: 1 play, 4 yards, 0:05.**
- KC – Walter White 2-yard pass from Mike Livingston (Jan Stenerud kick), 8:11. Chiefs 20–0. **Drive: 8 plays, 63 yards, 3:18.**

**Fourth quarter**

- TB – John McKay Jr. 8-yard pass from Steve Spurrier (kick blocked), 10:55. Chiefs 20–6. **Drive: 10 plays, 86 yards, 4:52.**
- KC – MacArthur Lane 2-yard run (kick failed), 8:06. Chiefs 26–6. **Drive: 5 plays, 52 yards, 2:12.**
- TB – Essex Johnson 1-yard run (kick failed), 5:14. Chiefs 26–12. **Drive: 10 plays, 70 yards, 2:52.**
- TB – Jack Novak 30-yard pass from Steve Spurrier (Dave Green kick), 2:16. Chiefs 26–19. **Drive: 11 plays, 56 yards, 2:49.**
- KC – Mike Current tackled in endzone by John Lohmeyer for a Safety, 0:43. Chiefs 28–19.

Top passers

- KC – Mike Livingston – 17/30, 183 yards, 2 TD, 2 INT
- TB – Steve Spurrier – 20/36, 212 yards, 2 TD

Top rushers

- KC – Tommy Reamon – 18 rushes, 60 yards
- TB – Jimmy DuBose – 4 rushes, 12 yards

Top receivers

- KC – MacArthur Lane – 4 receptions, 47 yards
- TB – Essex Johnson – 8 receptions, 85 yards

==== Week 9: vs. Pittsburgh Steelers ====
Week 9: Pittsburgh Steelers at Kansas City Chiefs – Game summary

Quarter	1	2	3	4	Total
**Steelers**	7	3	21	14	**45**
Chiefs	0	0	0	0	**0**

at Arrowhead Stadium, Kansas City, Missouri

- Date: November 7
- Game time: 1:00 p.m. CST
- Game weather: Clear, 48 °F (9 °C)
- Game attendance: 71,516
- Referee: Fred Silva
- TV announcers (NBC): Ross Porter and Lionel Aldridge
- Box score

Game information

**First quarter**

- PIT – Reggie Harrison 4-yard run (Roy Gerela kick), 1:00. Steelers 7–0. **Drive: 6 plays, 20 yards, 3:02.**

**Second quarter**

- PIT – Roy Gerela 28-yard field goal, 1:16. Steelers 10–0. **Drive: 13 plays, 56 yards, 5:51.**

**Third quarter**

- PIT – Franco Harris 25-yard run (Roy Gerela kick), 7:21. Steelers 17–0. **Drive: 2 plays, 75 yards, 0:54.**
- PIT – Franco Harris 5-yard run (Roy Gerela kick), 4:11. Steelers 24–0. **Drive: 3 plays, 39 yards, 1:25.**
- PIT – Frank Lewis 19-yard pass from Terry Bradshaw (Roy Gerela kick), 1:14. Steelers 31–0. **Drive: 5 plays, 38 yards, 1:52.**

**Fourth quarter**

- PIT – Jack Deloplaine 15-yard run (Roy Gerela kick), 9:02. Steelers 38–0. **Drive: 6 plays, 49 yards, 2:49.**
- PIT – Jack Deloplaine 7-yard run (Roy Gerela kick), 3:00. Steelers 45–0. **Drive: 7 plays, 58 yards, 3:00.**

Top passers

- PIT – Terry Bradshaw – 7/15, 132 yards, TD, INT
- KC – Mike Livingston – 11/25, 198 yards, 4 INT

Top rushers

- PIT – Franco Harris – 23 rushes, 117 yards, 2 TD
- KC – Pat McNeil – 5 rushes, 19 yards

Top receivers

- PIT – Ernie Pough – 3 receptions, 98 yards
- KC – Walter White – 6 receptions, 105 yards

==== Week 10: at Oakland Raiders ====
Week 10: Kansas City Chiefs at Oakland Raiders – Game summary

Quarter	1	2	3	4	Total
Chiefs	0	7	3	0	**10**
**Raiders**	7	7	7	0	**21**

at Oakland–Alameda County Coliseum, Oakland, California

- Date: November 14
- Game time: 1:00 p.m. PST
- Game weather: Overcast, 62 °F (17 °C)
- Game attendance: 48,259
- Referee: Dick Jorgensen
- TV announcers (NBC): Charlie Jones and Paul Maguire
- Box score

Game information

**First quarter**

- OAK – Fred Biletnikoff 32-yard pass from Ken Stabler (Errol Mann kick), 7:07. Raiders 7–0. **Drive: 3 plays, 48 yards, 0:44.**

**Second quarter**

- KC – MacArthur Lane 1-yard pass from Mike Livingston (Jan Stenerud kick), 13:19. Tied 7–7. **Drive: 18 plays, 79 yards, 8:48.**
- OAK – Pete Banaszak 1-yard run (Errol Mann kick), 3:24. Raiders 14–7. **Drive: 13 plays, 91 yards, 5:24.**

**Third quarter**

- OAK – Dave Casper 22-yard pass from Ken Stabler (Errol Mann kick), 8:03. Raiders 21–7. **Drive: 8 plays, 74 yards, 4:16.**
- KC – Jan Stenerud 41-yard field goal, 4:05. Raiders 21–10. **Drive: 7 plays, 47 yards, 3:58.**

**Fourth quarter**

- No scoring plays.

Top passers

- KC – Mike Livingston – 15/28, 206 yards, TD
- OAK – Ken Stabler – 10/18, 138 yards, 2 TD, 4 INT

Top rushers

- KC – MacArthur Lane – 12 rushes, 32 yards
- OAK – Mark van Eeghen – 19 rushes, 95 yards

Top receivers

- KC – Larry Brunson – 4 receptions, 76 yards
- OAK – Fred Biletnikoff – 2 receptions, 44 yards, TD

==== Week 11: vs. Cincinnati Bengals ====
Week 11: Cincinnati Bengals at Kansas City Chiefs – Game summary

Quarter	1	2	3	4	Total
**Bengals**	14	0	6	7	**27**
Chiefs	0	7	7	10	**24**

at Arrowhead Stadium, Kansas City, Missouri

- Date: November 21
- Game time: 1:00 p.m. CST
- Game weather: Sunny, 45 °F (7 °C)
- Game attendance: 46,259
- Referee: Cal Lepore
- TV announcers (NBC): Jay Randolph and Floyd Little
- Box score

Game information

**First quarter**

- CIN – Archie Griffin 77-yard run (Chris Bahr kick), 14:38. Bengals 7–0. **Drive: 1 play, 77 yards, 0:22.**
- CIN – Boobie Clark 18-yard run (Chris Bahr kick), 3:07. Bengals 14–0. **Drive: 9 plays, 80 yards, 4:13.**

**Second quarter**

- KC – Tommy Reamon 1-yard run (Jan Stenerud kick), 4:37. Bengals 14–7. **Drive: 6 plays, 31 yards, 2:07.**

**Third quarter**

- KC – Tommy Reamon 1-yard run (Jan Stenerud kick), 11:30. Tied 14–14. **Drive: 4 plays, 10 yards, 1:52.**
- CIN – Stan Fritts 1-yard run (kick failed), 1:41. Bengals 20–14. **Drive: 9 plays, 62 yards, 3:24.**

**Fourth quarter**

- KC – Jan Stenerud 24-yard field goal, 13:01. Bengals 20–17. **Drive: 9 plays, 60 yards, 3:28.**
- KC – Walter White 34-yard pass from Mike Livingston (Jan Stenerud kick), 11:54. Chiefs 24–20. **Drive: 4 plays, 21 yards, 0:54.**
- CIN – Tony Davis 1-yard run (Chris Bahr kick), 4:20. Bengals 27–24. **Drive: 5 plays, 62 yards, 2:35.**

Top passers

- CIN – Ken Anderson – 9/17, 123 yards, INT
- KC – Mike Livingston – 12/25, 179 yards, TD

Top rushers

- CIN – Archie Griffin – 13 rushes, 139 yards, TD
- KC – MacArthur Lane – 13 rushes, 36 yards

Top receivers

- CIN – Bob Trumpy – 3 receptions, 53 yards
- KC – Walter White – 5 receptions, 87 yards, TD

==== Week 12: at San Diego Chargers ====
Week 12: Kansas City Chiefs at San Diego Chargers – Game summary

Quarter	1	2	3	4	Total
**Chiefs**	10	0	3	10	**23**
Chargers	7	6	0	7	**20**

at San Diego Stadium, San Diego, California

- Date: November 28
- Game time: 1:00 p.m. PST
- Game weather: Clear, 70 °F (21 °C)
- Game attendance: 29,272
- Referee: Red Cashion
- TV announcers (NBC): Ross Porter and Lionel Aldridge
- Box score

Game information

**First quarter**

- SD – Don Woods 3-yard pass from Dan Fouts (Ray Wersching kick), 10:46. Chargers 7–0. **Drive: 9 plays, 80 yards, 4:14.**
- KC – Ed Podolak 5-yard run (Jan Stenerud kick), 6:38. Tied 7–7. **Drive: 9 plays, 69 yards, 4:08.**
- KC – Jan Stenerud 40-yard field goal, 3:48. Chiefs 10–7. **Drive: 7 plays, 15 yards, 1:16.**

**Second quarter**

- SD – Rickey Young 6-yard pass from Dan Fouts (kick failed), 6:11. Chargers 13–10. **Drive: 11 plays, 70 yards, 6:18.**

**Third quarter**

- KC – Jan Stenerud 28-yard field goal, 9:05. Tied 13–13. **Drive: 10 plays, 60 yards, 5:55.**

**Fourth quarter**

- KC – Jan Stenerud 26-yard field goal, 13:25. Chiefs 16–13. **Drive: 13 plays, 75 yards, 5:30.**
- SD – Charlie Joiner 13-yard pass from Dan Fouts (Ray Wersching kick), 7:04. Chargers 20–16. **Drive: 12 plays, 80 yards, 6:21.**
- KC – Ed Podolak 5-yard run (Jan Stenerud kick), 5:14. Chiefs 23–20. **Drive: 5 plays, 84 yards, 1:50.**

Top passers

- KC – Mike Livingston – 14/27, 195 yards, INT
- SD – Dan Fouts – 18/32, 218 yards, 3 TD, 3 INT

Top rushers

- KC – Ed Podolak – 25 rushes, 127 yards, 2 TD
- SD – Rickey Young – 16 rushes, 90 yards

Top receivers

- KC – Larry Brunson – 3 receptions, 86 yards
- SD – Don Woods – 7 receptions, 79 yards, TD

==== Week 13: at Denver Broncos ====
Week 13: Kansas City Chiefs at Denver Broncos – Game summary

Quarter	1	2	3	4	Total
Chiefs	3	13	0	0	**16**
**Broncos**	7	7	0	3	**17**

at Mile High Stadium, Denver, Colorado

- Date: December 5
- Game time: 2:00 p.m. MST
- Game weather: Cloudy, 34 °F (1 °C)
- Game attendance: 58,170
- Referee: Bernie Ulman
- TV announcers (NBC): Ross Porter and Sam DeLuca
- Box score

Game information

**First quarter**

- DEN – Haven Moses 8-yard pass from Craig Penrose (Jim Turner kick), 7:17. Broncos 7–0. **Drive: 7 plays, 40 yards, 2:52.**
- KC – Jan Stenerud 31-yard field goal, 2:39. Broncos 7–3. **Drive: 9 plays, 38 yards, 4:38.**

**Second quarter**

- KC – Walter White 3-yard pass from Mike Livingston (Jan Stenerud kick), 14:17. Chiefs 10–7. **Drive: 7 plays, 41 yards, 3:06.**
- DEN – Riley Odoms 29-yard pass from Craig Penrose (Jim Turner kick), 10:35. Broncos 14–10. **Drive: 7 plays, 68 yards, 3:42.**
- KC – Mike Livingston 1-yard run (kick blocked), 0:05. Chiefs 16–14. **Drive: 5 plays, 30 yards, 0:50.**

**Third quarter**

- No scoring plays.

**Fourth quarter**

- DEN – Jim Turner 20-yard field goal, 8:07. Broncos 17–16. **Drive: 9 plays, 71 yards, 4:27.**

Top passers

- KC – Mike Livingston – 17/29, 177 yards, TD, INT
- DEN – Craig Penrose – 11/27, 176 yards, 2 TD, 2 INT

Top rushers

- KC – Ed Podolak – 16 rushes, 41 yards
- DEN – Otis Armstrong – 17 rushes, 45 yards

Top receivers

- KC – Walter White – 4 receptions, 56 yards, TD
- DEN – Haven Moses – 3 receptions, 51 yards, TD

==== Week 14: vs. Cleveland Browns ====
Week 14: Cleveland Browns at Kansas City Chiefs – Game summary

Quarter	1	2	3	4	Total
Browns	0	7	7	0	**14**
**Chiefs**	0	15	17	7	**39**

at Arrowhead Stadium, Kansas City, Missouri

- Date: December 12
- Game time: 1:00 p.m. CST
- Game weather: Sunny, 45 °F (7 °C)
- Game attendance: 34,340
- Referee: Ben Dreith
- TV announcers (NBC): Jack Buck and Paul Maguire
- Box score

Game information

**First quarter**

- No scoring plays.

**Second quarter**

- CLE – Larry Poole 1-yard run (Don Cockroft kick), 14:18. Browns 7–0. **Drive: 8 plays, 68 yards, 1:22.**
- KC – Ed Podolak 22-yard run (kick blocked), 11:29. Browns 7–6. **Drive: 6 plays, 70 yards, 2:48.**
- KC – Ed Podolak 2-yard run (kick blocked), 4:45. Chiefs 12–7. **Drive: 10 plays, 52 yards, 4:13.**
- KC – Jan Stenerud 27-yard field goal, 0:39. Chiefs 15–7. **Drive: 10 plays, 68 yards, 2:30.**

**Third quarter**

- KC – Ed Podolak 2-yard run (Jan Stenerud kick), 6:48. Chiefs 22–7. **Drive: 2 plays, 2 yards, 0:06.**
- CLE – Paul Warfield 13-yard pass from Brian Sipe (Don Cockroft kick), 4:15. Chiefs 22–14. **Drive: 5 plays, 68 yards, 2:33.**
- KC – MacArthur Lane 2-yard run (Jan Stenerud kick), 2:05. Chiefs 29–14. **Drive: 6 plays, 56 yards, 2:10.**
- KC – Jan Stenerud 42-yard field goal, 0:19. Chiefs 32–14. **Drive: 4 plays, 8 yards, 1:39.**

**Fourth quarter**

- KC – Walter White 10-yard pass from Tony Adams (Jan Stenerud kick), 5:03. Chiefs 39–14. **Drive: 9 plays, 32 yards, 4:40.**

Top passers

- CLE – Brian Sipe – 11/24, 125 yards, TD, 2 INT
- KC – Tony Adams – 15/29, 201 yards, TD

Top rushers

- CLE – Greg Pruitt – 9 rushes, 46 yards
- KC – Ed Podolak – 29 rushes, 137 yards, 3 TD

Top receivers

- CLE – Dave Logan – 2 receptions, 60 yards
- KC – Ed Podolak – 4 receptions, 71 yards

== Standings ==
AFC West
	W	L	T	PCT	DIV	CONF	PF	PA	STK
^{(1)} Oakland Raiders	13	1	0	.929	7–0	10–1	350	237	W10
Denver Broncos	9	5	0	.643	5–2	7–5	315	206	W2
San Diego Chargers	6	8	0	.429	2–5	4–8	248	285	L1
Kansas City Chiefs	5	9	0	.357	2–5	4–8	290	376	W1
Tampa Bay Buccaneers	0	14	0	.000	0–4	0–13	125	412	L14
