= 1977 Kansas City Chiefs season =

NFL team season

- Owner: Lamar Hunt
- General manager: Jim Schaaf
- Head coach: Paul Wiggin (fired Oct. 31, 1–6 record); Tom Bettis (interim, 1–6 record)
- Home stadium: Arrowhead Stadium

Results
- Record: 2–12
- Division place: 5th AFC West
- Playoffs: Did not qualify
- All-Pros: None
- Pro Bowlers: None

The 1977 Kansas City Chiefs season was the franchise's 8th season in the National Football League, the 15th as the Kansas City Chiefs, and the 18th overall. This season was the worst in franchise history until the 2008 season, with the Chiefs winning only two of fourteen games. After an 0–5 start, Head coach Paul Wiggin was fired following a 44–7 loss to Cleveland in week 7. Tom Bettis took over as interim head coach for the rest of the season. The team endured a six-game losing streak to conclude the season at 2–12.

Linebackers Willie Lanier and Jim Lynch, the last remaining links to the Chiefs' Super Bowl IV championship team in 1969, each played their final NFL season.

== Off-season ==
=== 1977 NFL draft ===
1977 Kansas City Chiefs draft
| Round | Pick | Player | Position | College | Notes |
| 1 | 10 | Gary Green * | Cornerback | Baylor | |
| 2 | 37 | Tony Reed | Running back | Colorado | |
| 3 | 67 | Thomas Howard | Linebacker | Texas Tech | |
| 4 | 92 | Mark Bailey | Running back | Long Beach State | |
| 4 | 94 | Tony Samuels | Tight end | Bethune–Cookman | |
| 4 | 95 | Darius Helton | Guard | North Carolina Central | |
| 4 | 104 | Eric Harris | Cornerback | Memphis State | Made in 1980 |
| 6 | 150 | Rick Burleson | Defensive end | Texas | |
| 6 | 167 | Andre Herrera | Running back | Southern Illinois | |
| 7 | 177 | Chris Golub | Safety | Kansas | |
| 8 | 204 | Ron Olsonoski | Linebacker | St. Thomas | |
| 8 | 215 | Waddell Smith | Wide receiver | Kansas | |
| 9 | 226 | Derrick Glanton | Defensive end | Bishop | |
| 9 | 234 | Dave Green | Tackle | New Mexico | |
| 10 | 261 | Mark Vitali | Quarterback | Purdue | |
| 11 | 288 | Maurice Mitchell | Wide receiver | Northern Michigan | |
| 12 | 318 | Ray Burks | Linebacker | UCLA | |
Made roster * Made at least one Pro Bowl during career

=== Undrafted free agents ===
1977 undrafted free agents of note
| Player | Position | College |
|---|---|---|
| Jim Lohmann | Tackle | UTEP |

== Roster ==
1977 Kansas City Chiefs roster
| Quarterbacks (QB): 11 Tony Adams; 10 Mike Livingston; 6 Mark Vitali; Running backs (RB): 39 Mark Bailey; 43 John Brockington; 22 Ted McKnight; 21 Arnold Morgado; 32 Tony Reed; Wide receivers (WR): 83 Larry Brunson; 89 Henry Marshall; 84 Charlie Wade; Tight ends (TE): 85 Ed Beckman; 81 Tony Samuels; 88 Walter White | Offensive linemen (OL): 56 Charlie Ane C; 65 Tom Condon G; 77 Charlie Getty G/T; 60 Matt Herkenhoff T; 70 Jim Nicholson T; 58 Jack Rudnay C; 73 Bob Simmons G; 66 Tom Wickert T; Defensive linemen (DL): 61 Cliff Frazier DT; 78 Willie Lee DT; 87 John Lohmeyer DT; 64 Whitney Paul DE; 72 Keith Simons DT; 99 Wilbur Young DE | Linebackers (LB): 53 Billy Andrews OLB; 59 Raymond Burks OLB; 57 Jimbo Elrod MLB; 53 Thomas Howard; 63 Willie Lanier MLB; 51 Jim Lynch OLB; 54 Otis Rodgers OLB; 55 Dave Rozumek OLB; Defensive backs (DB): 25 Gary Barbaro FS; 37 Tim Collier CB; 40 Ricky Davis SS; 46 Tim Gray SS; 24 Gary Green CB; 18 Emmitt Thomas CB; 25 Ricky Wesson CB; Special teams (ST): 3 Jan Stenerud K; 44 Jerrel Wilson P | Reserve: 62 Darius Helton G (IR); 42 MacArthur Lane RB (IR); 14 Ed Podolak RB (IR); 76 Rod Walters G (IR); Rookies in italics |

== Season summary ==
An 0–5 start doomed the squad with a 44–7 loss at Cleveland (10/30) effectively sealing Wiggin's fate. Despite the club's record Wiggin was still a popular figure in Kansas City, but was nonetheless relieved of his duties on Halloween, marking the first in-season coaching switch in team history, and the last until 2011, when Todd Haley was fired with three games remaining. Wiggin concluded his tenure with an 11–24 record.

Defensive backs coach Tom Bettis was named interim coach and claimed a 20–10 victory vs. Green Bay (11/6) in the franchise's initial contest under his direction, but it was the only victory of his brief head coaching tenure. The team endured a six-game losing streak to conclude the season at 2–12. (Ironically, Haley's successor, Romeo Crennel, also won his first game in charge against the Packers at home; Green Bay entered that game 13–0.)

Bettis and the remainder of the coaching staff assembled by Wiggin were released on December 19, one day after a 21–20 loss at Oakland (12/18) in the regular season finale. Marv Levy, the former head coach of the CFL's Montreal Alouettes, was named the fourth head coach in franchise history on December 20.

The heart and soul of the Chiefs once-vaunted defense departed when roommates Willie Lanier and Jim Lynch, who both joined the club together as second-round draft picks in 1967, retired following the 1977 campaign. Baltimore later acquired Lanier's rights in a trade, but failed to lure him out of retirement.

By managing to win only twice in the 1977 season, the team was given the second pick in the 1978 NFL draft.

== Preseason ==
| Week | Date | Opponent | Result | Record | Venue | Attendance | Recap |
|---|---|---|---|---|---|---|---|
| 1 | August 6 | at Detroit Lions | L 0–17 | 0–1 | Pontiac Silverdome | 52,309 | Recap |
| 2 | August 13 | Pittsburgh Steelers | W 23–21 | 1–1 | Arrowhead Stadium | 28,584 | Recap |
| 3 | August 18 | at Washington Redskins | L 7–13 | 1–2 | RFK Stadium | 33,263 | Recap |
| 4 | August 27 | Los Angeles Rams | W 27–19 | 2–2 | Arrowhead Stadium | 34,975 | Recap |
| 5 | September 5 | Atlanta Falcons | L 16–24 | 2–3 | Arrowhead Stadium | 22,748 | Recap |
| 6 | September 10 | St. Louis Cardinals | W 37–20 | 3–3 | Arrowhead Stadium | 38,480 | Recap |

== Regular season ==
=== Schedule ===
| Week | Date | Opponent | Result | Record | Venue | Attendance | Recap |
|---|---|---|---|---|---|---|---|
| 1 | September 18 | at New England Patriots | **L** 17–21 | 0–1 | Schaefer Stadium | 58,185 | Recap |
| 2 | September 25 | **San Diego Chargers** | **L** 7–23 | 0–2 | Arrowhead Stadium | 56,146 | Recap |
| 3 | October 3 | **Oakland Raiders** | **L** 28–37 | 0–3 | Arrowhead Stadium | 60,684 | Recap |
| 4 | October 9 | at **Denver Broncos** | **L** 7–23 | 0–4 | Mile High Stadium | 74,878 | Recap |
| 5 | October 16 | Baltimore Colts | **L** 6–17 | 0–5 | Arrowhead Stadium | 63,076 | Recap |
| 6 | October 23 | at **San Diego Chargers** | **W** 21–16 | 1–5 | San Diego Stadium | 33,010 | Recap |
| 7 | October 30 | at Cleveland Browns | **L** 7–44 | 1–6 | Cleveland Stadium | 60,381 | Recap |
| 8 | November 6 | Green Bay Packers | **W** 20–10 | 2–6 | Arrowhead Stadium | 62,687 | Recap |
| 9 | November 13 | at Chicago Bears | **L** 27–28 | 2–7 | Soldier Field | 49,543 | Recap |
| 10 | November 20 | **Denver Broncos** | **L** 7–14 | 2–8 | Arrowhead Stadium | 54,050 | Recap |
| 11 | November 27 | at Houston Oilers | **L** 20–34 | 2–9 | Houston Astrodome | 42,934 | Recap |
| 12 | December 4 | Cincinnati Bengals | **L** 7–27 | 2–10 | Arrowhead Stadium | 38,488 | Recap |
| 13 | December 11 | **Seattle Seahawks** | **L** 31–34 | 2–11 | Arrowhead Stadium | 22,262 | Recap |
| 14 | December 18 | at **Oakland Raiders** | **L** 20–21 | 2–12 | Oakland–Alameda County Coliseum | 50,304 | Recap |
Note: Intra-division opponents are in **bold** text.

=== Game summaries ===
==== Week 1: at New England Patriots ====
Week 1: Kansas City Chiefs at New England Patriots – Game summary

| Quarter | 1 | 2 | 3 | 4 | Total |
|---|---|---|---|---|---|
| Chiefs | 14 | 0 | 0 | 3 | **17** |
| **Patriots** | 7 | 7 | 7 | 0 | **21** |

at Schaefer Stadium, Foxborough, Massachusetts

- Date: September 18
- Game time: 1:00 p.m. EDT
- Game weather: Hazy, warm, 76 °F (24 °C)
- Game attendance: 58,185
- Referee: Fred Silva
- TV announcers (NBC): Charlie Jones and Len Dawson
- Box score

Game information

**First quarter**

- KC – MacArthur Lane 1-yard run (Jan Stenerud kick), 7:54. Chiefs 7–0. **Drive: 7 plays, 19 yards, 3:34.**
- KC – Tony Reed 10-yard run (Jan Stenerud kick), 4:15. Chiefs 14–0. **Drive: 3 plays, 65 yards, 1:28.**
- NE – Darryl Stingley 34-yard run (John Smith kick), 0:52. Chiefs 14–7. **Drive: 8 plays, 80 yards, 3:23.**

**Second quarter**

- NE – Darryl Stingley 21-yard pass from Steve Grogan (John Smith kick), 1:08. Tied 14–14. **Drive: 4 plays, 42 yards, 0:38.**

**Third quarter**

- NE – Jess Phillips 11-yard run (John Smith kick), 2:02. Patriots 21–14. **Drive: 7 plays, 59 yards, 3:38.**

**Fourth quarter**

- KC – Jan Stenerud 22-yard field goal, 10:23. Patriots 21–17. **Drive: 13 plays, 76 yards, 6:39.**

Top passers

- KC – Mike Livingston – 13/26, 219 yards
- NE – Steve Grogan – 10/16, 155 yards, TD, 2 INT

Top rushers

- KC – Tony Reed – 19 rushes, 88 yards, TD
- NE – Sam Cunningham – 23 rushes, 105 yards

Top receivers

- KC – Henry Marshall – 3 receptions, 76 yards
- NE – Sam Cunningham – 3 receptions, 48 yards

==== Week 2: vs. San Diego Chargers ====
Week 2: San Diego Chargers at Kansas City Chiefs – Game summary

| Quarter | 1 | 2 | 3 | 4 | Total |
|---|---|---|---|---|---|
| **Chargers** | 7 | 9 | 0 | 7 | **23** |
| Chiefs | 7 | 0 | 0 | 0 | **7** |

at Arrowhead Stadium, Kansas City, Missouri

- Date: September 25
- Game time: 1:00 p.m. CDT
- Game weather: Overcast, 75 °F (24 °C)
- Game attendance: 56,146
- Referee: Red Cashion
- TV announcers (NBC): Stu Nahan and Floyd Little
- Box score

Game information

**First quarter**

- SD – Don Woods 12-yard pass from James Harris (Rolf Benirschke kick), 9:59. Chargers 7–0. **Drive: 6 plays, 41 yards, 3:21.**
- KC – Henry Marshall 19-yard pass from Mike Livingston (Jan Stenerud kick), 3:20. Tied 7–7. **Drive: 7 plays, 44 yards, 3:33.**

**Second quarter**

- SD – Leroy Jones 17-yard interception return (kick failed, hit right upright), 13:33. Chargers 13–7.
- SD – Rolf Benirschke 31-yard field goal, 0:24. Chargers 16–7. **Drive: 10 plays, 37 yards, 2:10.**

**Third quarter**

- No scoring plays.

**Fourth quarter**

- SD – Mike Fuller 7-yard run (Rolf Benirschke kick), 2:01. Chargers 23–7. **Drive: 14 plays, 54 yards, 7:58.**

Top passers

- SD – James Harris – 11/25, 85 yards, TD, 3 INT
- KC – Mike Livingston – 7/21, 101 yards, TD, 3 INT

Top rushers

- SD – Clarence Williams – 9 rushes, 88 yards
- KC – Tony Reed – 13 rushes, 26 yards

Top receivers

- SD – Joe Washington – 2 receptions, 18 yards
- KC – Walter White – 5 receptions, 70 yards

==== Week 3: vs. Oakland Raiders ====
Week 3: Oakland Raiders at Kansas City Chiefs – Game summary

| Quarter | 1 | 2 | 3 | 4 | Total |
|---|---|---|---|---|---|
| **Raiders** | 7 | 6 | 21 | 3 | **37** |
| Chiefs | 0 | 21 | 0 | 7 | **28** |

at Arrowhead Stadium, Kansas City, Missouri

- Date: October 3
- Game time: 8:00 p.m. CDT
- Game weather: Clear, 61 °F (16 °C)
- Game attendance: 60,684
- Referee: Jim Tunney
- TV announcers (ABC): Frank Gifford, Don Meredith and Howard Cosell
- Box score

Game information

**First quarter**

- OAK – Fred Biletnikoff 21-yard pass from Ken Stabler (Errol Mann kick), 6:27. Raiders 7–0. **Drive: 8 plays, 71 yards, 3:52.**

**Second quarter**

- OAK – Errol Mann 42-yard field goal, 14:13. Raiders 10–0. **Drive: 10 plays, 51 yards, 5:30.**
- KC – Walter White 48-yard pass from Mike Livingston (Jan Stenerud kick), 10:19. Raiders 10–7. **Drive: 7 plays, 80 yards, 3:54.**
- KC – Walter White 1-yard pass from Mike Livingston (Jan Stenerud kick), 5:28. Chiefs 14–10. **Drive: 6 plays, 21 yards, 2:38.**
- KC – Henry Marshall 41-yard pass from Mike Livingston (Jan Stenerud kick), 5:01. Chiefs 21–10. **Drive: 1 play, 31 yards, 0:11.**
- OAK – Errol Mann 34-yard field goal, 1:02. Chiefs 21–13. **Drive: 11 plays, 61 yards, 3:59.**

**Third quarter**

- OAK – Pete Banaszak 1-yard run (Errol Mann kick), 9:16. Chiefs 21–20. **Drive: 12 plays, 69 yards, 5:44.**
- OAK – Clarence Davis 37-yard run (Errol Mann kick), 5:34. Raiders 27–21. **Drive: 3 plays, 70 yards, 1:11.**
- OAK – Clarence Davis 2-yard run (Errol Mann kick), 3:02. Raiders 34–21. **Drive: 4 plays, 47 yards, 1:30.**

**Fourth quarter**

- KC – Lawrence Williams 13-yard run (Jan Stenerud kick), 13:31. Raiders 34–28. **Drive: 10 plays, 73 yards, 4:31.**
- OAK – Errol Mann 22-yard field goal, 5:37. Raiders 37–28. **Drive: 14 plays, 57 yards, 7:54.**

Top passers

- OAK – Ken Stabler – 19/28, 297 yards, TD, 3 INT
- KC – Mike Livingston – 9/20, 157 yards, 3 TD

Top rushers

- OAK – Mark van Eeghen – 24 rushes, 116 yards
- KC – Tony Reed – 12 rushes, 119 yards

Top receivers

- OAK – Dave Casper – 7 receptions, 101 yards
- KC – Henry Marshall – 3 receptions, 75 yards, TD

==== Week 4: at Denver Broncos ====
Week 4: Kansas City Chiefs at Denver Broncos – Game summary

| Quarter | 1 | 2 | 3 | 4 | Total |
|---|---|---|---|---|---|
| Chiefs | 0 | 0 | 0 | 7 | **7** |
| **Broncos** | 10 | 6 | 7 | 0 | **23** |

at Mile High Stadium, Denver, Colorado

- Date: October 9
- Game time: 2:00 p.m. MDT
- Game weather: Sunny, 68 °F (20 °C)
- Game attendance: 74,878
- Referee: Gordon McCarter
- TV announcers (NBC): Jay Randolph and Floyd Little
- Box score

Game information

**First quarter**

- DEN – Jim Turner 25-yard field goal, 7:31. Broncos 3–0. **Drive: 4 plays, 9 yards, 1:33.**
- DEN – Craig Morton 7-yard run (Jim Turner kick), 1:42. Broncos 10–0. **Drive: 5 plays, 25 yards, 1:55.**

**Second quarter**

- DEN – Jim Turner 33-yard field goal, 12:42. Broncos 13–0. **Drive: 7 plays, 16 yards, 2:24.**
- DEN – Jim Turner 33-yard field goal, 5:06. Broncos 16–0. **Drive: 12 plays, 61 yards, 5:10.**

**Third quarter**

- DEN – Otis Armstrong 1-yard run (Jim Turner kick), 9:17. Broncos 23–0. **Drive: 5 plays, 46 yards, 1:42.**

**Fourth quarter**

- KC – Ed Podolak 2-yard run (Jan Stenerud kick), 7:25. Broncos 23–7. **Drive: 5 plays, 44 yards, 1:35.**

Top passers

- KC – Tony Adams – 10/18, 81 yards, 2 INT
- DEN – Craig Morton – 13/21, 189 yards

Top rushers

- KC – Mark Bailey – 8 rushes, 30 yards
- DEN – Jon Keyworth – 13 rushes, 59 yards

Top receivers

- KC – Walter White – 6 receptions, 49 yards
- DEN – Rick Upchurch – 2 receptions, 64 yards

==== Week 5: vs. Baltimore Colts ====
Week 5: Baltimore Colts at Kansas City Chiefs – Game summary

| Quarter | 1 | 2 | 3 | 4 | Total |
|---|---|---|---|---|---|
| **Colts** | 14 | 0 | 3 | 0 | **17** |
| Chiefs | 0 | 6 | 0 | 0 | **6** |

at Arrowhead Stadium, Kansas City, Missouri

- Date: October 16
- Game time: 12:00 p.m. CDT
- Game weather: Clear, 54 °F (12 °C)
- Game attendance: 63,076
- Referee: Gene Barth
- TV announcers (NBC): Charlie Jones and Paul Maguire
- Box score

Game information

**First quarter**

- BAL – Ron Lee 1-yard run (Toni Linhart kick), 3:12. Colts 7–0. **Drive: 5 plays, 48 yards, 1:54.**
- BAL – Don McCauley 2-yard run (Toni Linhart kick), 0:36. Colts 14–0. **Drive: 6 plays, 36 yards, 3:01.**

**Second quarter**

- KC – John Brockington 1-yard run (kick aborted), 5:09. Colts 14–6. **Drive: 9 plays, 46 yards, 5:24.**

**Third quarter**

- BAL – Toni Linhart 44-yard field goal, 1:29. Colts 17–6. **Drive: 7 plays, 10 yards, 3:17.**

**Fourth quarter**

- No scoring plays.

Top passers

- BAL – Bert Jones – 11/20, 90 yards
- KC – Mike Livingston – 11/23, 146 yards, 2 INT

Top rushers

- BAL – Lydell Mitchell – 28 rushes, 97 yards
- KC – Tony Reed – 16 rushes, 69 yards

Top receivers

- BAL – Don McCauley – 3 receptions, 32 yards
- KC – Mark Bailey – 6 receptions, 86 yards

==== Week 6: at San Diego Chargers ====
Week 6: Kansas City Chiefs at San Diego Chargers – Game summary

| Quarter | 1 | 2 | 3 | 4 | Total |
|---|---|---|---|---|---|
| **Chiefs** | 0 | 0 | 7 | 14 | **21** |
| Chargers | 3 | 7 | 3 | 3 | **16** |

at San Diego Stadium, San Diego, California

- Date: October 23
- Game time: 1:00 p.m. PDT
- Game weather: Hazy, 75 °F (24 °C)
- Game attendance: 33,010
- Referee: Chuck Heberling
- TV announcers (NBC): Jay Randolph and Floyd Little
- Box score

Game information

**First quarter**

- SD – Rolf Benirschke 40-yard field goal, 10:25. Chargers 3–0. **Drive: 11 plays, 58 yards, 4:35.**

**Second quarter**

- SD – Larry Dorsey 26-yard pass from James Harris (Rolf Benirschke kick), 5:22. Chargers 10–0. **Drive: 4 plays, 41 yards, 1:58.**

**Third quarter**

- KC – Walter White 5-yard pass from Tony Adams (Jan Stenerud kick), 9:09. Chargers 10–7. **Drive: 9 plays, 80 yards, 3:05.**
- SD – Rolf Benirschke 47-yard field goal, 4:11. Chargers 13–7. **Drive: 10 plays, 44 yards, 4:58.**

**Fourth quarter**

- SD – Rolf Benirschke 24-yard field goal, 9:14. Chargers 16–7. **Drive: 11 plays, 53 yards, 5:28.**
- KC – Tony Reed 1-yard run (Jan Stenerud kick), 2:30. Chargers 16–14. **Drive: 2 plays, 1 yard, 0:27.**
- KC – Tim Gray 15-yard fumble return (Jan Stenerud kick), 2:08. Chiefs 21–16.

Top passers

- KC – Tony Adams – 15/26, 215 yards, TD
- SD – James Harris – 18/35, 233 yards, TD, 2 INT

Top rushers

- KC – Tony Reed – 22 rushes, 68 yards, TD
- SD – Rickey Young – 13 rushes, 51 yards

Top receivers

- KC – Walter White – 6 receptions, 96 yards, TD
- SD – Rickey Young – 9 receptions, 97 yards

==== Week 7: at Cleveland Browns ====
Week 7: Kansas City Chiefs at Cleveland Browns – Game summary

| Quarter | 1 | 2 | 3 | 4 | Total |
|---|---|---|---|---|---|
| Chiefs | 0 | 0 | 0 | 7 | **7** |
| **Browns** | 13 | 17 | 7 | 7 | **44** |

at Cleveland Municipal Stadium, Cleveland, Ohio

- Date: October 30
- Game time: 1:00 p.m. EST
- Game weather: Sunny, clear, 61 °F (16 °C)
- Game attendance: 60,381
- Referee: Bernie Ulman
- TV announcers (NBC): Jack Buck and Mike Haffner
- Box score

Game information

**First quarter**

- CLE – Gary Parris 7-yard pass from Brian Sipe (Don Cockroft kick), 8:08. Browns 7–0. **Drive: 9 plays, 47 yards, 3:53.**
- CLE – Don Cockroft 29-yard field goal, 4:28. Browns 10–0. **Drive: 4 plays, 7 yards, 1:37.**
- CLE – Don Cockroft 34-yard field goal, 0:43. Browns 13–0. **Drive: 7 plays, 35 yards, 1:50.**

**Second quarter**

- CLE – Don Cockroft 27-yard field goal, 11:13. Browns 16–0. **Drive: 8 plays, 58 yards, 2:46.**
- CLE – Thom Darden 18-yard interception return (Don Cockroft kick), 6:40. Browns 23–0.
- CLE – Mike Pruitt 1-yard run (Don Cockroft kick), 1:09. Browns 30–0. **Drive: 3 plays, 42 yards, 1:07.**

**Third quarter**

- CLE – Greg Pruitt 78-yard run (Don Cockroft kick), 3:13. Browns 37–0. **Drive: 1 play, 78 yards, 0:12.**

**Fourth quarter**

- CLE – Gary Parris 2-yard pass from Dave Mays(Don Cockroft kick), 2:39. Browns 44–0. **Drive: 15 plays, 90 yards, 8:08.**
- KC – John Brockington 22-yard pass from Mike Livingston (Jan Stenerud kick), 1:19. Browns 44–7. **Drive: 7 plays, 78 yards, 1:20.**

Top passers

- KC – Mike Livingston – 12/22, 121 yards, TD, INT
- CLE – Brian Sipe – 12/25, 200 yards, TD, 2 INT

Top rushers

- KC – Ed Podolak – 9 rushes, 87 yards
- CLE – Greg Pruitt – 18 rushes, 153 yards, TD

Top receivers

- KC – Larry Brunson – 4 receptions, 54 yards
- CLE – Reggie Rucker – 4 receptions, 94 yards

==== Week 8: vs. Green Bay Packers ====
Week 8: Green Bay Packers at Kansas City Chiefs – Game summary

| Quarter | 1 | 2 | 3 | 4 | Total |
|---|---|---|---|---|---|
| Packers | 0 | 0 | 3 | 7 | **10** |
| **Chiefs** | 10 | 0 | 0 | 10 | **20** |

at Arrowhead Stadium, Kansas City, Missouri

- Date: November 6
- Game time: 1:00 p.m. CST
- Game weather: Overcast, 58 °F (14 °C)
- Game attendance: 62,687
- Referee: Bob Frederic
- TV announcers (CBS): Lindsey Nelson and Paul Hornung
- Box score

Game information

**First quarter**

- KC – Jan Stenerud 27-yard field goal, 9:16. Chiefs 3–0. **Drive: 11 plays, 61 yards, 5:44.**
- KC – Henry Marshall 3-yard pass from Mike Livingston (Jan Stenerud kick), 6:23. Chiefs 10–0. **Drive: 4 plays, 39 yards, 1:19.**

**Second quarter**

- No scoring plays.

**Third quarter**

- GB – Chester Marcol 31-yard field goal, 9:11. Chiefs 10–3. **Drive: 11 plays, 49 yards, 5:49.**

**Fourth quarter**

- KC – Ed Podolak 1-yard run (Jan Stenerud kick), 14:53. Chiefs 17–3. **Drive: 7 plays, 43 yards, 2:48.**
- GB – Terdell Middleton 85-yard kickoff return (Chester Marcol kick), 14:25. Chiefs 17–10.
- KC – Jan Stenerud 22-yard field goal, 4:47. Chiefs 20–10. **Drive: 11 plays, 56 yards, 5:05.**

Top passers

- GB – Lynn Dickey – 15/28, 139 yards
- KC – Mike Livingston – 11/21, 143 yards, TD

Top rushers

- GB – Terdell Middleton – 14 rushes, 49 yards
- KC – Ed Podolak – 18 rushes, 98 yards, TD

Top receivers

- GB – Steve Odom – 6 receptions, 80 yards
- KC – Ed Podolak – 4 receptions, 51 yards

==== Week 9: at Chicago Bears ====
Week 9: Kansas City Chiefs at Chicago Bears – Game summary

| Quarter | 1 | 2 | 3 | 4 | Total |
|---|---|---|---|---|---|
| Chiefs | 14 | 3 | 0 | 10 | **27** |
| **Bears** | 0 | 0 | 7 | 21 | **28** |

at Soldier Field, Chicago, Illinois

- Date: November 13
- Game time: 1:00 p.m. CST
- Game weather: Partly cloudy and cool, 38 °F (3 °C)
- Game attendance: 49,543
- Referee: Don Wedge
- TV announcers (NBC): Jay Randolph and Mike Adamle
- Box score

Game information

**First quarter**

- KC – Mike Livingston 1-yard run (Jan Stenerud kick), 9:28. Chiefs 7–0. **Drive: 11 plays, 60 yards, 5:32.**
- KC – Ed Podolak 1-yard run (Jan Stenerud kick), 5:22. Chiefs 14–0. **Drive: 7 plays, 66 yards, 2:44.**

**Second quarter**

- KC – Jan Stenerud 37-yard field goal, 1:12. Chiefs 17–0. **Drive: 7 plays, 34 yards, 1:50.**

**Third quarter**

- CHI – Walter Payton 1-yard run (Bob Thomas kick), 9:37. Chiefs 17–7. **Drive: 6 plays, 31 yards, 2:26.**

**Fourth quarter**

- CHI – Walter Payton 1-yard run (Bob Thomas kick), 7:37. Chiefs 17–14. **Drive: 10 plays, 54 yards, 4:37.**
- KC – Jan Stenerud 21-yard field goal, 3:21. Chiefs 20–14. **Drive: 10 plays, 52 yards, 4:16.**
- CHI – Walter Payton 15-yard run (Bob Thomas kick), 2:02. Bears 21–20. **Drive: 6 plays, 69 yards, 1:19.**
- KC – Ed Podolak 14-yard run (Jan Stenerud kick), 0:24. Chiefs 27–21. **Drive: 9 plays, 56 yards, 1:38.**
- CHI – Greg Latta 37-yard pass from Bob Avellini (Bob Thomas kick), 0:03. Bears 28–27. **Drive: 2 plays, 57 yards, 0:21.**

Top passers

- KC – Mike Livingston – 16/27, 185 yards, 2 INT
- CHI – Bob Avellini – 11/23, 193 yards, TD, 2 INT

Top rushers

- KC – Ed Podolak – 29 rushes, 102 yards, 2 TD
- CHI – Walter Payton – 33 rushes, 192 yards, 3 TD

Top receivers

- KC – Walter White – 7 receptions, 92 yards
- CHI – Greg Latta – 2 receptions, 50 yards, TD

==== Week 10: vs. Denver Broncos ====
Week 10: Denver Broncos at Kansas City Chiefs – Game summary

| Quarter | 1 | 2 | 3 | 4 | Total |
|---|---|---|---|---|---|
| **Broncos** | 0 | 7 | 0 | 7 | **14** |
| Chiefs | 0 | 7 | 0 | 0 | **7** |

at Arrowhead Stadium, Kansas City, Missouri

- Date: November 20
- Game time: 1:00 p.m. CST
- Game weather: Clear, 52 °F (11 °C)
- Game attendance: 54,050
- Referee: Dick Jorgensen
- TV announcers (NBC): Jay Randolph and Mike Haffner
- Box score

Game information

**First quarter**

- No scoring plays.

**Second quarter**

- DEN – Lonnie Perrin 2-yard run (Jim Turner kick), 11:55. Broncos 7–0. **Drive: 11 plays, 47 yards, 4:13.**
- KC – Henry Marshall 15-yard pass from Mike Livingston (Jan Stenerud kick), 0:12. Tied 7–7. **Drive: 11 plays, 62 yards, 1:31.**

**Third quarter**

- No scoring plays.

**Fourth quarter**

- DEN – Haven Moses 23-yard pass from Craig Morton (Jim Turner kick), 4:29. Broncos 14–7. **Drive: 4 plays, 52 yards, 1:39.**

Top passers

- DEN – Craig Morton – 8/18, 135 yards, TD, 2 INT
- KC – Mike Livingston – 20/33, 180 yards, TD, INT

Top rushers

- DEN – Otis Armstrong – 21 rushes, 120 yards
- KC – Raymond Burks – 1 rush, 51 yards

Top receivers

- DEN – Haven Moses – 4 receptions, 80 yards, TD
- KC – Larry Brunson – 5 receptions, 51 yards

==== Week 11: at Houston Oilers ====
Week 11: Kansas City Chiefs at Houston Oilers – Game summary

| Quarter | 1 | 2 | 3 | 4 | Total |
|---|---|---|---|---|---|
| Chiefs | 0 | 6 | 0 | 14 | **20** |
| **Oilers** | 7 | 7 | 6 | 14 | **34** |

at Houston Astrodome, Houston, Texas

- Date: November 27
- Game time: 1:00 p.m. CST
- Game weather: None (indoor stadium)
- Game attendance: 42,934
- Referee: Red Cashion
- TV announcers (NBC): Jack Buck and Paul Maguire
- Box score

Game information

**First quarter**

- HOU – Ken Burrough 48-yard pass from Dan Pastorini (Tom Dempsey kick), 12:33. Oilers 7–0. **Drive: 1 play, 48 yards, 0:08.**

**Second quarter**

- HOU – Tim Wilson 11-yard run (Tom Dempsey kick), 14:14. Oilers 14–0. **Drive: 5 plays, 32 yards, 2:02.**
- KC – Jan Stenerud 30-yard field goal, 9:03. Oilers 14–3. **Drive: 13 plays, 67 yards, 5:11.**
- KC – Jan Stenerud 26-yard field goal, 1:12. Oilers 14–6. **Drive: 7 plays, 20 yards, 1:24.**

**Third quarter**

- HOU – Tim Wilson 1-yard run (kick failed), 8:11. Oilers 20–6. **Drive: 12 plays, 74 yards, 6:49.**

**Fourth quarter**

- HOU – Ken Burrough 7-yard pass from Dan Pastorini (Tom Dempsey kick), 13:05. Oilers 27–6. **Drive: 3 plays, 89 yards, 0:47.**
- HOU – Don Hardeman 3-yard pass from Dan Pastorini (Tom Dempsey kick), 11:23. Oilers 34–6. **Drive: 3 plays, 28 yards, 1:32.**
- KC – Walter White 36-yard pass from Tony Adams (Jan Stenerud kick), 2:23. Oilers 34–13. **Drive: 4 plays, 72 yards, 1:17.**
- KC – Willie Lee 10-yard fumble return (Jan Stenerud kick), 1:35. Oilers 34–20.

Top passers

- KC – Mike Livingston – 15/34, 201 yards, INT
- HOU – Dan Pastorini – 11/24, 118 yards, 3 TD, 2 INT

Top rushers

- KC – Ed Podolak – 9 rushes, 40 yards
- HOU – Rob Carpenter – 14 rushes, 149 yards

Top receivers

- KC – Walter White – 4 receptions, 79 yards, TD
- HOU – Ken Burrough – 4 receptions, 58 yards, 2 TD

==== Week 12: vs. Cincinnati Bengals ====
Week 12: Cincinnati Bengals at Kansas City Chiefs – Game summary

| Quarter | 1 | 2 | 3 | 4 | Total |
|---|---|---|---|---|---|
| **Bengals** | 7 | 10 | 3 | 7 | **27** |
| Chiefs | 7 | 0 | 0 | 0 | **7** |

at Arrowhead Stadium, Kansas City, Missouri

- Date: December 4
- Game time: 1:00 p.m. CST
- Game weather: Overcast, foggy, 30 °F (−1 °C)
- Game attendance: 38,488
- Referee: Bernie Ulman
- TV announcers (NBC): Jack Buck and Floyd Little
- Box score

Game information

**First quarter**

- CIN – Billy Brooks 15-yard pass from Ken Anderson (Chris Bahr kick), 5:04. Bengals 7–0. **Drive: 14 plays, 80 yards, 6:42.**
- KC – Mark Bailey 47-yard pass from Mike Livingston (Jan Stenerud kick), 3:33. Tied 7–7. **Drive: 4 plays, 73 yards, 1:31.**

**Second quarter**

- CIN – Chris Bahr 35-yard field goal, 13:59. Bengals 10–7. **Drive: 10 plays, 27 yards, 2:17.**
- CIN – Pat McInally 14-yard pass from Ken Anderson (Chris Bahr kick), 0:07. Bengals 17–7. **Drive: 1 plays, 14 yards, 0:05.**

**Third quarter**

- CIN – Chris Bahr 20-yard field goal, 1:42. Bengals 20–7. **Drive: 13 plays, 57 yards, 6:51.**

**Fourth quarter**

- CIN – Pete Johnson 1-yard run (Chris Bahr kick), 14:57. Bengals 27–7. **Drive: 4 plays, 12 yards, 1:35.**

Top passers

- CIN – Ken Anderson – 9/24, 102 yards, 2 TD
- KC – Mike Livingston – 12/25, 178 yards, TD, 2 INT

Top rushers

- CIN – Archie Griffin – 18 rushes, 80 yards
- KC – Ted McKnight – 5 rushes, 25 yards

Top receivers

- CIN – Archie Griffin – 3 receptions, 36 yards
- KC – Henry Marshall – 4 receptions, 80 yards

==== Week 13: vs. Seattle Seahawks ====
Week 13: Seattle Seahawks at Kansas City Chiefs – Game summary

| Quarter | 1 | 2 | 3 | 4 | Total |
|---|---|---|---|---|---|
| **Seahawks** | 14 | 20 | 0 | 0 | **34** |
| Chiefs | 21 | 0 | 3 | 7 | **31** |

at Arrowhead Stadium, Kansas City, Missouri

- Date: December 11
- Game time: 1:00 p.m. CST
- Game weather: Sunny, 40 °F (4 °C)
- Game attendance: 22,262
- Referee: Fred Silva
- TV announcers (NBC): Jay Randolph and Andy Russell
- Box score

Game information

**First quarter**

- KC – Walter White 30-yard pass from Mike Livingston (Jan Stenerud kick), 10:19. Chiefs 7–0. **Drive: 6 plays, 55 yards, 1:35.**
- SEA – David Sims 1-yard run (John Leypoldt kick), 7:46. Tied 7–7. **Drive: 8 plays, 74 yards, 2:33.**
- KC – Gary Barbaro 102-yard interception return (Jan Stenerud kick), 7:11. Chiefs 14–7.
- SEA – David Sims 5-yard run (John Leypoldt kick), 4:13. Tied 14–14. **Drive: 6 plays, 65 yards, 2:58.**
- KC – Ed Podolak 1-yard run (Jan Stenerud kick), 1:09. Chiefs 21–14. **Drive: 8 plays, 26 yards, 3:04.**

**Second quarter**

- SEA – Don Testerman 1-yard run (kick blocked), 11:34. Chiefs 21–20. **Drive: 9 plays, 54 yards, 4:23.**
- SEA – Sherman Smith 35-yard pass from Jim Zorn (John Leypoldt kick), 9:27. Seahawks 27–21. **Drive: 3 plays, 54 yards, 0:53.**
- SEA – Dave Brown 27-yard interception return (John Leypoldt kick), 1:12. Seahawks 34–21.

**Third quarter**

- KC – Jan Stenerud 23-yard field goal, 10:13. Seahawks 34–24. **Drive: 9 plays, 69 yards, 4:47.**

**Fourth quarter**

- KC – Mark Bailey 1-yard run (Jan Stenerud kick), 12:26. Seahawks 34–31. **Drive: 3 plays, 6 yards, 1:12.**

Top passers

- SEA – Jim Zorn – 8/14, 133 yards, TD, 2 INT
- KC – Tony Adams – 7/13, 135 yards, 2 INT

Top rushers

- SEA – Sherman Smith – 19 rushes, 86 yards
- KC – Ed Podolak – 21 rushes, 92 yards, TD

Top receivers

- SEA – Sherman Smith – 3 receptions, 63 yards, TD
- KC – Larry Brunson – 3 receptions, 95 yards

==== Week 14: at Oakland Raiders ====
Week 14: Kansas City Chiefs at Oakland Raiders – Game summary

| Quarter | 1 | 2 | 3 | 4 | Total |
|---|---|---|---|---|---|
| Chiefs | 0 | 7 | 13 | 0 | **20** |
| **Raiders** | 3 | 3 | 12 | 3 | **21** |

at Oakland–Alameda County Coliseum, Oakland, California

- Date: December 18
- Game time: 1:00 p.m. PST
- Game weather: Partly cloudy, 54 °F (12 °C)
- Game attendance: 50,304
- Referee: Gordon McCarter
- TV announcers (NBC): Dick Stockton and Mike Haffner
- Box score

Game information

**First quarter**

- OAK – Errol Mann 31-yard field goal, 7:47. Raiders 3–0. **Drive: 8 plays, 34 yards, 3:25.**

**Second quarter**

- KC – Tim Collier 100-yard interception return (Jan Stenerud kick), 14:45. Chiefs 7–3.
- OAK – Errol Mann 19-yard field goal, 7:28. Chiefs 7–6. **Drive: 10 plays, 63 yards, 5:38.**

**Third quarter**

- KC – Mark Bailey 37-yard run (Jan Stenerud kick), 10:13. Chiefs 14–6. **Drive: 7 plays, 65 yards, 2:07.**
- KC – Tim Gray 14-yard fumble return (kick blocked), 9:53. Chiefs 20–6.
- OAK – Carl Garrett 5-yard run (kick failed, wide left), 5:21. Chiefs 20–12. **Drive: 4 plays, 18 yards, 2:02.**
- OAK – Carl Garrett 4-yard pass from Mike Rae (kick failed, hit right upright), 2:11. Chiefs 20–18. **Drive: 3 plays, 9 yards, 1:33.**

**Fourth quarter**

- OAK – Errol Mann 28-yard field goal, 6:33. Raiders 21–20. **Drive: 13 plays, 69 yards, 7:26.**

Top passers

- KC – Tony Adams – 10/18, 131 yards, 4 INT
- OAK – Mike Rae – 10/16, 117 yards, TD, INT

Top rushers

- KC – Tony Reed – 15 rushes, 61 yards
- OAK – Mark van Eeghen – 16 rushes, 71 yards

Top receivers

- KC – Tony Samuels – 4 receptions, 62 yards
- OAK – Fred Biletnikoff – 3 receptions, 55 yards

=== Standings ===
AFC West
| | W | L | T | PCT | DIV | CONF | PF | PA | STK |
|---|---|---|---|---|---|---|---|---|---|
| ^{(1)} Denver Broncos | 12 | 2 | 0 | .857 | 6–1 | 11–1 | 274 | 148 | L1 |
| ^{(4)} Oakland Raiders | 11 | 3 | 0 | .786 | 5–2 | 10–2 | 351 | 230 | W2 |
| San Diego Chargers | 7 | 7 | 0 | .500 | 3–4 | 6–6 | 222 | 205 | L2 |
| Seattle Seahawks | 5 | 9 | 0 | .357 | 1–3 | 4–9 | 282 | 373 | W2 |
| Kansas City Chiefs | 2 | 12 | 0 | .143 | 1–6 | 1–11 | 225 | 349 | L6 |
