= 1975 Kansas City Chiefs season =

NFL team season

- Owner: Lamar Hunt
- General manager: Jack Steadman
- Head coach: Paul Wiggin
- Home stadium: Arrowhead Stadium

Results
- Record: 5–9
- Division place: 3rd AFC West
- Playoffs: Did not qualify
- Pro Bowlers: C Jack Rudnay; LB Willie Lanier; CB Emmitt Thomas; K Jan Stenerud

The 1975 Kansas City Chiefs season was the franchise's 6th season in the National Football League, the 13th as the Kansas City Chiefs, and the 16th overall, it ended with a second consecutive 5–9 record and the Chiefs missed the playoffs for the 4th straight year. San Francisco 49ers defensive coordinator Paul Wiggin was named the second head coach in franchise history on January 23. A former Pro Bowl defensive end for the Cleveland Browns, Wiggin inherited the unenviable task of rebuilding a squad whose pool of talent had been largely depleted due to age and a number of ill-fated trades that had left the club devoid of first-round draft choices in 1973 and 1975. After an 0–3 start to the season, Wiggin directed the Chiefs to three straight wins, beginning with a convincing 42–10 victory against the Raiders on October 12. The highlight of the season was a 34–31 upset win at Dallas on Monday Night Football. The club could not maintain the early success. Owning a 5–5 record heading into the homestretch of the season, injuries to a number of key players crippled the team. The team dropped its final four contests of the year to finish at 5–9 for the second consecutive season. The regular season finale at Oakland marked the final games in the Hall of Fame careers of Len Dawson and Buck Buchanan.

== Offseason ==
=== NFL draft ===
1975 Kansas City Chiefs draft
Round	Pick	Player	Position	College	Notes
2	34	Elmore Stephens	Tight end	Kentucky	
3	59	Cornelius Walker	Defensive tackle	Rice	
6	137	Morris LaGrand	Running back	Tampa	
6	139	Dave Wasick	Linebacker	San Jose State	
8	189	Wayne Hoffman	Tight end	Oklahoma	
11	268	Dale Hegland	Guard	Minnesota	
12	293	James Rackley	Running back	Florida A&M	
13	318	John Snider	Linebacker	Stanford	
14	346	Gene Moshier	Guard	Vanderbilt	
16	396	Mark Petersen	Defensive end	Illinois	
17	424	Mike Bulino	Defensive back	Pittsburgh	
Made roster

== Roster ==
1975 Kansas City Chiefs roster
Quarterbacks (QB): 11 Tony Adams; 13 Wayne Clark; Running backs (RB): 41 Doug Dressler; 27 Woody Green; 31 Jeff Kinney; 42 MacArthur Lane; 14 Ed Podolak; Wide receivers (WR): 83 Larry Brunson; 80 Reggie Craig; 85 Barry Pearson; Tight ends (TE): 84 Billy Masters; 88 Walter White	Offensive linemen (OL): 56 Charlie Ane C; 77 Charlie Getty T; 70 Jim Nicholson T; 66 Rocky Rasley G; 58 Jack Rudnay C; 62 Bill Story T; 67 Michael Wilson G; Defensive linemen (DL): 86 Buck Buchanan DT; -- Larry Estes DT/DE; 74 Tom Keating DT; 79 John Matuszak DE; -- Louis Ross DE; 99 Wilbur Young DE	Linebackers (LB): 53 Ken Avery OLB; 50 Tim Kearney OLB; 63 Willie Lanier MLB; 51 Jim Lynch OLB; 57 Al Palewicz MLB; 55 Bill Peterson OLB; Defensive backs (DB): 21 Hise Austin CB; 46 Jim Kearney SS; 47 Don Martin CB; 15 Kerry Reardon CB; 20 Mike Sensibaugh FS; 18 Emmitt Thomas CB; Special teams (ST): 5 Jim McCann P; 3 Jan Stenerud K	Reserve: 64 Randy Beisler G (IR); 68 Roger Bernhardt G (IR); 71 Ed Budde G (IR); 16 Len Dawson QB (IR); 60 Matt Herkenhoff T (IR); 10 Mike Livingston QB (IR); 87 John Lohmeyer DT (IR); 75 Bob Maddox DT (IR); 40 Jim Marsalis CB (IR); 7 Mike Nott QB (IR); 73 Gery Palmer G (IR); 89 Otis Taylor WR (IR); 81 Marvin Upshaw DE (IR); -- Dave Wasick LB (IR); 54 Clyde Werner LB (IR); 44 Jerrel Wilson P (IR); Rookies in italics

== Preseason ==
Week	Date	Opponent	Result	Record	Venue	Attendance	Recap
1	August 9	St. Louis Cardinals	L 3–10	0–1	Arrowhead Stadium	40,081	Recap
2	August 18	Dallas Cowboys	W 26–20	1–1	Arrowhead Stadium	35,630	Recap
3	August 23	at Detroit Lions	L 24–27	1–2	Pontiac Metropolitan Stadium	62,094	Recap
4	August 30	Los Angeles Rams	L 6–14	1–3	Arrowhead Stadium	39,814	Recap
5	September 6	Green Bay Packers	W 31–3	2–3	Arrowhead Stadium	35,543	Recap
6	September 12	at Buffalo Bills	W 9–7	3–3	Rich Stadium	48,691	Recap

== Regular season ==
=== Schedule ===
Week	Date	Opponent	Result	Record	Venue	Attendance	Recap
1	September 21	at **Denver Broncos**	**L** 33–37	0–1	Mile High Stadium	51,858	Recap
2	September 28	New York Jets	**L** 24–30	0–2	Arrowhead Stadium	73,939	Recap
3	October 5	San Francisco 49ers	**L** 3–20	0–3	Arrowhead Stadium	54,490	Recap
4	October 12	**Oakland Raiders**	**W** 42–10	1–3	Arrowhead Stadium	60,425	Recap
5	October 19	at **San Diego Chargers**	**W** 12–10	2–3	San Diego Stadium	26,469	Recap
6	October 26	**Denver Broncos**	**W** 26–13	3–3	Arrowhead Stadium	70,043	Recap
7	November 2	Houston Oilers	**L** 13–17	3–4	Arrowhead Stadium	62,989	Recap
8	November 10	at Dallas Cowboys	**W** 34–31	4–4	Texas Stadium	63,539	Recap
9	November 16	at Pittsburgh Steelers	**L** 3–28	4–5	Three Rivers Stadium	48,803	Recap
10	November 23	Detroit Lions	**W** 24–21 (OT)	5–5	Arrowhead Stadium	55,161	Recap
11	November 30	at Baltimore Colts	**L** 14–28	5–6	Memorial Stadium	42,122	Recap
12	December 7	**San Diego Chargers**	**L** 20–28	5–7	Arrowhead Stadium	46,888	Recap
13	December 14	at Cleveland Browns	**L** 14–40	5–8	Cleveland Stadium	44,368	Recap
14	December 21	at **Oakland Raiders**	**L** 20–28	5–9	Oakland–Alameda County Coliseum	48,604	Recap
Note: Intra-division opponents are in **bold** text.

=== Game summaries ===
==== Week 1: at Denver Broncos ====
Week 1: Kansas City Chiefs at Denver Broncos – Game summary

Quarter	1	2	3	4	Total
Chiefs	7	10	13	3	**33**
**Broncos**	0	17	7	13	**37**

at Mile High Stadium, Denver, Colorado

- Date: September 21
- Game time: 2:00 p.m. MDT
- Game weather: Mostly sunny, 58 °F (14 °C)
- Game attendance: 51,858
- Referee: Bernie Ulman
- TV announcers (NBC): Jay Randolph and Paul Maguire
- Box score

Game information

**First quarter**

- KC – Walter White 69-yard pass from Mike Livingston (Jan Stenerud kick), 1:15. Chiefs 7–0. **Drive: 2 plays, 40 yards, 1:02.**

**Second quarter**

- KC – Jan Stenerud 41-yard field goal, 14:27. Chiefs 10–0. **Drive: 4 plays, –3 yards, 0:21.**
- DEN – Rick Upchurch 13-yard run (Jim Turner kick), 12:04. Chiefs 10–7. **Drive: 5 plays, 80 yards, 2:23.**
- DEN – Jack Dolbin 39-yard pass from Charley Johnson (Jim Turner kick), 8:18. Broncos 14–10. **Drive: 2 plays, 41 yards, 0:53.**
- KC – Woody Green 8-yard pass from Mike Livingston (Jan Stenerud kick), 2:23. Chiefs 17–14. **Drive: 12 plays, 69 yards, 5:55.**
- DEN – Jim Turner 23-yard field goal, 0:28. Tied 17–17. **Drive: 7 plays, 74 yards, 1:50.**

**Third quarter**

- DEN – Rick Upchurch 90-yard pass from Charley Johnson (Jim Turner kick), 13:54. Broncos 24–17. **Drive: 2 plays, 75 yards, 1:06.**
- KC – Jan Stenerud 34-yard field goal, 10:30. Broncos 24–20. **Drive: 7 plays, 62 yards, 3:24.**
- KC – Woody Green 1-yard run (Jan Stenerud kick), 5:33. Chiefs 27–24. **Drive: 8 plays, 25 yards, 4:50.**
- KC – Jan Stenerud 45-yard field goal, 2:22. Chiefs 30–24. **Drive: 6 plays, 14 yards, 2:48.**

**Fourth quarter**

- KC – Jan Stenerud 47-yard field goal, 14:55. Chiefs 33–24. **Drive: 4 plays, 1 yard, 1:03.**
- DEN – Jack Dolbin 2-yard fumble return (kick blocked), 6:17. Chiefs 33–30. **Drive: 5 plays, 73 yards, 2:31.**
- DEN – Billy Van Heusen 10-yard pass from Charley Johnson (Jim Turner kick), 1:49. Broncos 37–33. **Drive: 6 plays, 52 yards, 2:48.**

Top passers

- KC – Mike Livingston – 13/27, 221 yards, 2 TD
- DEN – Charley Johnson – 12/20, 329 yards, 3 TD, 2 INT

Top rushers

- KC – Jeff Kinney – 18 rushes, 59 yards
- DEN – Otis Armstrong – 18 rushes, 82 yards

Top receivers

- KC – Walter White – 2 receptions, 79 yards, TD
- DEN – Rick Upchurch – 3 receptions, 153 yards, TD

==== Week 2: vs. New York Jets ====
Week 2: New York Jets at Kansas City Chiefs – Game summary

Quarter	1	2	3	4	Total
**Jets**	14	3	6	7	**30**
Chiefs	7	7	7	3	**24**

at Arrowhead Stadium, Kansas City, Missouri

- Date: September 28
- Game time: 1:00 p.m. CDT
- Game weather: Overcast, 63 °F (17 °C)
- Game attendance: 73,939
- Referee: Ben Dreith
- TV announcers (NBC): Charlie Jones and Sam DeLuca
- Box score

Game information

**First quarter**

- NYJ – John Riggins 1-yard run (Pat Leahy kick), 12:11. Jets 7–0. **Drive: 7 plays, 80 yards, 2:49.**
- NYJ – Carl Garrett 1-yard run (Pat Leahy kick), 9:31. Jets 14–0. **Drive: 5 plays, 49 yards, 1:36.**
- KC – Woody Green 4-yard run (Jan Stenerud kick), 0:01. Jets 14–7. **Drive: 10 plays, 58 yards, 4:56.**

**Second quarter**

- KC – Ed Podolak 10-yard run (Jan Stenerud kick), 0:42. Tied 14–14. **Drive: 12 plays, 82 yards, 3:21.**
- NYJ – Pat Leahy 32-yard field goal, 0:00. Jets 17–14. **Drive: 5 plays, 53 yards, 0:42.**

**Third quarter**

- NYJ – John Riggins 2-yard run (kick aborted), 7:49. Jets 23–14. **Drive: 9 plays, 61 yards, 5:00.**
- KC – Barry Pearson 36-yard pass from Len Dawson (Jan Stenerud kick), 3:52. Jets 23–21. **Drive: 8 plays, 60 yards, 3:57.**

**Fourth quarter**

- NYJ – Rich Caster 9-yard pass from Joe Namath (Pat Leahy kick), 14:02. Jets 30–21. **Drive: 7 plays, 62 yards, 4:31.**
- KC – Jan Stenerud 35-yard field goal, 4:49. Jets 30–24. **Drive: 12 plays, 47 yards, 4:59.**

Top passers

- NYJ – Joe Namath – 7/14, 126 yards, TD, 2 INT
- KC – Len Dawson – 20/32, 233 yards, TD

Top rushers

- NYJ – John Riggins – 27 rushes, 145 yards, 2 TD
- KC – Ed Podolak – 11 rushes, 53 yards, TD

Top receivers

- NYJ – Rich Caster – 3 receptions, 69 yards, TD
- KC – Ed Podolak – 5 receptions, 54 yards

==== Week 3: vs. San Francisco 49ers ====
Week 3: San Francisco 49ers at Kansas City Chiefs – Game summary

Quarter	1	2	3	4	Total
**49ers**	0	10	3	7	**20**
Chiefs	0	3	0	0	**3**

at Arrowhead Stadium, Kansas City, Missouri

- Date: October 5
- Game time: 1:00 p.m. CDT
- Game weather: Sunny, 70 °F (21 °C)
- Game attendance: 54,490
- Referee: Fred Wyant
- TV announcers (CBS): Frank Glieber and Alex Hawkins
- Box score

Game information

**First quarter**

- No scoring plays.

**Second quarter**

- KC – Jan Stenerud 19-yard field goal, 12:56. Chiefs 3–0. **Drive: 14 plays, 72 yards, 7:10.**
- SF – Tom Mitchell 24-yard pass from Norm Snead (Steve Mike-Mayer kick), 6:27. 49ers 7–3. **Drive: 11 plays, 67 yards, 6:29.**
- SF – Steve Mike-Mayer 19-yard field goal, 1:12. 49ers 10–3. **Drive: 4 plays, 9 yards, 1:06.**

**Third quarter**

- SF – Steve Mike-Mayer 29-yard field goal, 0:22. 49ers 13–3. **Drive: 4 plays, 0 yards, 0:51.**

**Fourth quarter**

- SF – Larry Schreiber 5-yard run (Steve Mike-Mayer kick), 13:03. 49ers 20–3. **Drive: 3 plays, 36 yards, 0:42.**

Top passers

- SF – Norm Snead – 12/20, 124 yards, TD
- KC – Len Dawson – 17/27, 184 yards, INT

Top rushers

- SF – Delvin Williams – 15 rushes, 66 yards
- KC – Ed Podolak – 8 rushes, 34 yards

Top receivers

- SF – Larry Schreiber – 4 receptions, 32 yards
- KC – Ed Podolak – 6 receptions, 65 yards

==== Week 4: vs. Oakland Raiders ====
Week 4: Oakland Raiders at Kansas City Chiefs – Game summary

Quarter	1	2	3	4	Total
Raiders	3	0	0	7	**10**
**Chiefs**	21	7	0	14	**42**

at Arrowhead Stadium, Kansas City, Missouri

- Date: October 12
- Game time: 3:00 p.m. CDT
- Game weather: Sunny, 88 °F (31 °C)
- Game attendance: 60,425
- Referee: Chuck Heberling
- TV announcers (NBC): Jim Simpson and John Brodie
- Box score

Game information

**First quarter**

- OAK – George Blanda 23-yard field goal, 7:39. Raiders 3–0. **Drive: 10 plays, 56 yards, 4:29.**
- KC – Walter White 48-yard pass from Mike Livingston (Jan Stenerud kick), 4:01. Chiefs 7–3. **Drive: 8 plays, 66 yards, 3:38.**
- KC – Woody Green 5-yard run (Jan Stenerud kick), 2:58. Chiefs 14–3. **Drive: 1 play, 5 yards, 0:12.**
- KC – Mike Livingston 1-yard fumble return (Jan Stenerud kick), 1:09. Chiefs 21–3. **Drive: 2 plays, 33 yards, 0:12.**

**Second quarter**

- KC – Ed Podolak 7-yard pass from Mike Livingston (Jan Stenerud kick), 1:15. Chiefs 28–3. **Drive: 10 plays, 80 yards, 4:46.**

**Third quarter**

- No scoring plays.

**Fourth quarter**

- KC – Billy Masters 5-yard pass from Mike Livingston (Jan Stenerud kick), 14:52. Chiefs 35–3. **Drive: 10 plays, 80 yards, 5:40.**
- KC – Morris LaGrand 1-yard run (Jan Stenerud kick), 8:38. Chiefs 42–3. **Drive: 9 plays, 70 yards, 3:30.**
- OAK – Cliff Branch 9-yard pass from David Humm (George Blanda kick), 0:48. Chiefs 42–10. **Drive: 7 plays, 46 yards, 0:46.**

Top passers

- OAK – David Humm – 9/19, 143 yards, TD
- KC – Mike Livingston – 10/16, 170 yards, 3 TD, INT

Top rushers

- OAK – Mark van Eeghen – 13 rushes, 52 yards
- KC – Woody Green – 24 rushes, 101 yards, TD

Top receivers

- OAK – Cliff Branch – 6 receptions, 85 yards, TD
- KC – Walter White – 3 receptions, 78 yards, TD

==== Week 5: at San Diego Chargers ====
Week 5: Kansas City Chiefs at San Diego Chargers – Game summary

Quarter	1	2	3	4	Total
**Chiefs**	0	9	0	3	**12**
Chargers	3	0	7	0	**10**

at San Diego Stadium, San Diego, California

- Date: October 19
- Game time: 1:00 p.m. PDT
- Game weather: Hazy, 70 °F (21 °C)
- Game attendance: 26,469
- Referee: Gene Barth
- TV announcers (NBC): Ross Porter and Willie Davis
- Box score

Game information

**First quarter**

- SD – Ray Wersching 36-yard field goal, 11:47. Chargers 3–0. **Drive: 4 plays, –4 yards, 0:50.**

**Second quarter**

- KC – Jan Stenerud 31-yard field goal, 9:21. Tied 3–3. **Drive: 11 plays, 55 yards, 4:41.**
- KC – Walter White 60-yard pass from Mike Livingston (kick blocked), 0:53. Chiefs 9–3. **Drive: 5 plays, 88 yards, 1:54.**

**Third quarter**

- SD – Sam Scarber 2-yard pass from Jesse Freitas (Ray Wersching kick), 3:05. Chargers 10–9. **Drive: 9 plays, 50 yards, 5:10.**

**Fourth quarter**

- KC – Jan Stenerud 27-yard field goal, 12:06. Chiefs 12–10. **Drive: 12 plays, 63 yards, 5:40.**

Top passers

- KC – Mike Livingston – 14/23, 224 yards, TD
- SD – Jesse Freitas – 5/12, 44 yards, TD, INT

Top rushers

- KC – Woody Green – 18 rushes, 79 yards
- SD – Don Woods – 19 rushes, 72 yards

Top receivers

- KC – Walter White – 2 receptions, 105 yards, TD
- SD – Pat Curran – 3 receptions, 42 yards

==== Week 6: vs. Denver Broncos ====
Week 6: Denver Broncos at Kansas City Chiefs – Game summary

Quarter	1	2	3	4	Total
Broncos	0	0	0	13	**13**
**Chiefs**	3	3	3	17	**26**

at Arrowhead Stadium, Kansas City, Missouri

- Date: October 26
- Game time: 1:00 p.m. CST
- Game weather: Sunny, 55 °F (13 °C)
- Game attendance: 70,043
- Referee: Jim Tunney
- TV announcers (NBC): Jay Randolph and Paul Maguire
- Box score

Game information

**First quarter**

- KC – Jan Stenerud 28-yard field goal, 0:21. Chiefs 3–0. **Drive: 12 plays, 65 yards, 5:13.**

**Second quarter**

- KC – Jan Stenerud 46-yard field goal, 6:43. Chiefs 6–0. **Drive: 6 plays, 30 yards, 1:28.**

**Third quarter**

- KC – Jan Stenerud 37-yard field goal, 10:11. Chiefs 9–0. **Drive: 12 plays, 56 yards, 4:49.**

**Fourth quarter**

- DEN – Fran Lynch 1-yard run (kick aborted), 13:22. Chiefs 9–6. **Drive: 14 plays, 71 yards, 7:38.**
- KC – Jan Stenerud 23-yard field goal, 10:13. Chiefs 12–6. **Drive: 5 plays, 69 yards, 2:58.**
- KC – Mike Livingston 8-yard run (Jan Stenerud kick), 8:51. Chiefs 19–6. **Drive: 4 plays, 17 yards, 0:59.**
- KC – Billy Masters 7-yard pass from Mike Livingston (Jan Stenerud kick), 7:04. Chiefs 26–6. **Drive: 2 plays, 2 yards, 0:47.**
- DEN – Jon Keyworth 19-yard pass from Steve Ramsey (Jim Turner kick), 0:57. Chiefs 26–13. **Drive: 7 plays, 80 yards, 1:16.**

Top passers

- DEN – Steve Ramsey – 11/17, 164 yards, TD, INT
- KC – Mike Livingston – 10/23, 113 yards, TD, INT

Top rushers

- DEN – Floyd Little – 13 rushes, 58 yards
- KC – Larry Brunson – 1 rush, 65 yards

Top receivers

- DEN – Jon Keyworth – 8 receptions, 67 yards, TD
- KC – MacArthur Lane – 14 receptions, 56 yards

==== Week 7: vs. Houston Oilers ====
Week 7: Houston Oilers at Kansas City Chiefs – Game summary

Quarter	1	2	3	4	Total
**Oilers**	7	0	7	3	**17**
Chiefs	3	10	0	0	**13**

at Arrowhead Stadium, Kansas City, Missouri

- Date: November 2
- Game time: 1:00 p.m. CST
- Game weather: Overcast, 70 °F (21 °C)
- Game attendance: 62,989
- Referee: Dick Jorgensen
- TV announcers (NBC): Charlie Jones and Sam DeLuca
- Box score

Game information

**First quarter**

- KC – Jan Stenerud 37-yard field goal, 7:24. Chiefs 3–0. **Drive: 6 plays, 18 yards, 2:07.**
- HOU – Ken Burrough 77-yard pass from Dan Pastorini (Skip Butler kick), 0:00. Oilers 7–3. **Drive: 4 plays, 84 yards, 1:23.**

**Second quarter**

- KC – Jan Stenerud 47-yard field goal, 11:11. Oilers 7–6. **Drive: 8 plays, 54 yards, 3:49.**
- KC – Jeff Kinney 1-yard run (Jan Stenerud kick), 7:13. Chiefs 13–7. **Drive: 9 plays, 51 yards, 2:48.**

**Third quarter**

- HOU – Ken Burrough 57-yard pass from Dan Pastorini (Skip Butler kick), 11:20. Oilers 14–13. **Drive: 4 plays, 75 yards, 1:37.**

**Fourth quarter**

- HOU – Skip Butler 44-yard field goal, 11:11. Oilers 17–13. **Drive: 4 plays, 6 yards, 1:25.**

Top passers

- HOU – Dan Pastorini – 11/19, 198 yards, 2 TD, INT
- KC – Mike Livingston – 17/36, 220 yards, 3 INT

Top rushers

- HOU – Don Hardeman – 12 rushes, 62 yards
- KC – Ed Podolak – 12 rushes, 52 yards

Top receivers

- HOU – Ken Burrough – 7 receptions, 177 yards, 2 TD
- KC – Barry Pearson – 4 receptions, 73 yards

==== Week 8: at Dallas Cowboys ====
Week 8: Kansas City Chiefs at Dallas Cowboys – Game summary

Quarter	1	2	3	4	Total
**Chiefs**	3	21	3	7	**34**
Cowboys	0	17	14	0	**31**

at Texas Stadium, Irving, Texas

- Date: November 10
- Game time: 8:00 p.m. CST
- Game weather: Clear, 59 °F (15 °C)
- Game attendance: 63,539
- Referee: Pat Haggerty
- TV announcers (ABC): Frank Gifford, Alex Karras and Howard Cosell
- Box score

Game information

**First quarter**

- KC – Jan Stenerud 51-yard field goal, 0:49. Chiefs 3–0. **Drive: 4 plays, –2 yards, 0:57.**

**Second quarter**

- DAL – Roger Staubach 9-yard run (Toni Fritsch kick), 12:30. Cowboys 7–3. **Drive: 9 plays, 65 yards, 3:19.**
- DAL – Toni Fritsch 31-yard field goal, 10:53. Cowboys 10–3. **Drive: 4 plays, 4 yards, 1:27.**
- KC – John Matuszak fumble recovery in endzone (Jan Stenerud kick), 8:12. Tied 10–10.
- DAL – Golden Richards 15-yard pass from Roger Staubach (Toni Fritsch kick), 5:10. Cowboys 17–10. **Drive: 6 plays, 73 yards, 3:02.**
- KC – Ed Podolak 1-yard run (Jan Stenerud kick), 1:20. Tied 17–17. **Drive: 11 plays, 70 yards, 3:50.**
- KC – Ed Podolak 11-yard run (Jan Stenerud kick), 0:57. Chiefs 24–17. **Drive: 2 plays, 15 yards, 0:11.**

**Third quarter**

- DAL – Golden Richards 47-yard pass from Roger Staubach (Toni Fritsch kick), 8:31. Tied 24–24. **Drive: 7 plays, 75 yards, 4:11.**
- KC – Jan Stenerud 44-yard field goal, 5:13. Chiefs 27–24. **Drive: 5 plays, 20 yards, 1:35.**
- DAL – Roger Staubach 1-yard run (Toni Fritsch kick), 1:29. Cowboys 31–27. **Drive: 7 plays, 73 yards, 3:44.**

**Fourth quarter**

- KC – Ed Podolak 5-yard pass from Mike Livingston (Jan Stenerud kick), 10:07. Chiefs 34–31. **Drive: 7 plays, 41 yards, 3:35.**

Top passers

- KC – Mike Livingston – 13/28, 145 yards, TD
- DAL – Roger Staubach – 17/31, 243 yards, 2 TD, 2 INT

Top rushers

- KC – Ed Podolak – 20 rushes, 88 yards, 2 TD
- DAL – Robert Newhouse – 11 rushes, 54 yards

Top receivers

- KC – Barry Pearson – 3 receptions, 53 yards
- DAL – Golden Richards – 3 receptions, 84 yards, 2 TD

==== Week 9: at Pittsburgh Steelers ====
Week 9: Kansas City Chiefs at Pittsburgh Steelers – Game summary

Quarter	1	2	3	4	Total
Chiefs	0	3	0	0	**3**
**Steelers**	0	7	14	7	**28**

at Three Rivers Stadium, Pittsburgh, Pennsylvania

- Date: November 16
- Game time: 1:00 p.m. EST
- Game weather: Sunny, 49 °F (9 °C)
- Game attendance: 48,803
- Referee: Bernie Ulman
- TV announcers (NBC): Curt Gowdy and Al DeRogatis
- Box score

Game information

**First quarter**

- No scoring plays.

**Second quarter**

- KC – Jan Stenerud 32-yard field goal, 11:36. Chiefs 3–0. **Drive: 9 plays, 50 yards, 3:49.**
- PIT – Lynn Swann 42-yard pass from Terry Bradshaw (Roy Gerela kick), 0:07. Steelers 7–3. **Drive: 4 plays, 86 yards, 0:49.**

**Third quarter**

- PIT – Reggie Harrison 10-yard run (Roy Gerela kick), 12:27. Steelers 14–3. **Drive: 6 plays, 51 yards, 2:33.**
- PIT – John Stallworth 16-yard pass from Terry Bradshaw (Roy Gerela kick), 4:31. Steelers 21–3. **Drive: 10 plays, 74 yards, 5:51.**

**Fourth quarter**

- PIT – Mike Collier 21-yard run (Roy Gerela kick), 1:54. Steelers 28–3. **Drive: 9 plays, 82 yards, 4:07.**

Top passers

- KC – Mike Livingston – 11/23, 152 yards, INT
- PIT – Terry Bradshaw – 16/24, 204 yards, 2 TD, INT

Top rushers

- KC – Ed Podolak – 12 rushes, 29 yards
- PIT – Franco Harris – 17 rushes, 119 yards

Top receivers

- KC – Walter White – 2 receptions, 48 yards
- PIT – Franco Harris – 6 receptions, 61 yards

==== Week 10: vs. Detroit Lions ====
Week 10: Detroit Lions at Kansas City Chiefs – Game summary

Quarter	1	2	3	4	OT	Total
Lions	0	8	3	10	0	**21**
**Chiefs**	14	0	7	0	3	**24**

at Arrowhead Stadium, Kansas City, Missouri

- Date: November 23
- Game time: 1:00 p.m. CST
- Game weather: Partly cloudy, 43 °F (6 °C)
- Game attendance: 55,161
- Referee: Gordon McCarter
- TV announcers (CBS): Al Michaels and Hank Stram
- Box score

Game information

**First quarter**

- KC – Larry Brunson 21-yard pass from Len Dawson (Jan Stenerud kick), 5:50. Chiefs 7–0. **Drive: 6 plays, 74 yards, 2:19.**
- KC – MacArthur Lane 4-yard run (Jan Stenerud kick), 1:30. Chiefs 14–0. **Drive: 7 plays, 35 yards, 2:56.**

**Second quarter**

- DET – Morris LaGrand tackled in end zone for a Safety, 9:46. Chiefs 14–2.
- DET – Joe Reed 2-yard run (kick blocked), 4:17. Chiefs 14–8. **Drive: 10 plays, 55 yards, 5:29.**

**Third quarter**

- DET – Errol Mann 37-yard field goal, 2:18. Chiefs 14–11. **Drive: 9 plays, 40 yards, 4:02.**
- KC – MacArthur Lane 20-yard run (Jan Stenerud kick), 0:28. Chiefs 21–11. **Drive: 6 plays, 55 yards, 1:50.**

**Fourth quarter**

- DET – Ray Jarvis 10-yard pass from Joe Reed (Errol Mann kick), 2:28. Chiefs 21–18. **Drive: 15 plays, 71 yards, 7:26.**
- DET – Errol Mann 44-yard field goal, 0:00. Tied 21–21. **Drive: 7 plays, 26 yards, 1:02.**

**Overtime**

- KC – Jan Stenerud 26-yard field goal, 8:16. Chiefs 24–21. **Drive: 6 plays, 53 yards, 2:06.**

Top passers

- DET – Joe Reed – 10/26, 139 yards, TD, INT
- KC – Len Dawson – 17/25, 217 yards, TD, INT

Top rushers

- DET – Altie Taylor – 19 rushes, 84 yards
- KC – Woody Green – 19 rushes, 135 yards

Top receivers

- DET – George Farmer – 4 receptions, 62 yards
- KC – Walter White – 3 receptions, 69 yards

==== Week 11: at Baltimore Colts ====
Week 11: Kansas City Chiefs at Baltimore Colts – Game summary

Quarter	1	2	3	4	Total
Chiefs	0	0	0	14	**14**
**Colts**	0	14	14	0	**28**

at Memorial Stadium, Baltimore, Maryland

- Date: November 30
- Game time: 2:00 p.m. EST
- Game weather: Cloudy, 56 °F (13 °C)
- Game attendance: 42,122
- Referee: Bob Frederic
- TV announcers (NBC): Bill O'Donnell and Sam DeLuca
- Box score

Game information

**First quarter**

- No scoring plays.

**Second quarter**

- BAL – Jackie Wallace 42-yard interception return (Toni Linhart kick), 11:22. Colts 7–0.
- BAL – Bill Olds 1-yard run (Toni Linhart kick), 6:30. Colts 14–0. **Drive: 6 plays, 73 yards, 2:46.**

**Third quarter**

- BAL – Lydell Mitchell 70-yard run (Toni Linhart kick), 11:34. Colts 21–0. **Drive: 1 play, 70 yards, 0:13.**
- BAL – Raymond Chester 17-yard pass from Bert Jones (Toni Linhart kick), 3:10. Colts 28–0. **Drive: 6 plays, 49 yards, 2:50.**

**Fourth quarter**

- KC – Doug Dressler 3-yard pass from Len Dawson (Jan Stenerud kick), 14:52. Colts 28–7. **Drive: 6 plays, 87 yards, 3:17.**
- KC – Larry Brunson 25-yard pass from Len Dawson (Jan Stenerud kick), 2:42. Colts 28–14. **Drive: 10 plays, 80 yards, 5:46.**

Top passers

- KC – Len Dawson – 25/36, 207 yards, 2 TD, 2 INT
- BAL – Bert Jones – 12/13, 145 yards, TD

Top rushers

- KC – Woody Green – 12 rushes, 25 yards
- BAL – Lydell Mitchell – 26 rushes, 178 yards, TD

Top receivers

- KC – Larry Brunson – 5 receptions, 91 yards, TD
- BAL – Glenn Doughty – 2 receptions, 74 yards

==== Week 12: vs. San Diego Chargers ====
Week 12: San Diego Chargers at Kansas City Chiefs – Game summary

Quarter	1	2	3	4	Total
**Chargers**	7	0	7	14	**28**
Chiefs	3	3	14	0	**20**

at Arrowhead Stadium, Kansas City, Missouri

- Date: December 7
- Game time: 1:00 p.m. CST
- Game weather: Overcast, 38 °F (3 °C)
- Game attendance: 46,888
- Referee: Fred Silva
- TV announcers (NBC): Charlie Jones and Sam DeLuca
- Box score

Game information

**First quarter**

- SD – Rickey Young 5-yard run (Ray Wersching kick), 13:59. Chargers 7–0. **Drive: 3 plays, 24 yards.**
- KC – Jan Stenerud 21-yard field goal, 7:55. Chargers 7–3. **Drive: 9 plays, 43 yards, 4:36.**

**Second quarter**

- KC – Jan Stenerud 22-yard field goal, 9:52. Chargers 7–6. **Drive: 8 plays, 58 yards, 4:48.**

**Third quarter**

- SD – Sam Scarber 8-yard run (Ray Wersching kick), 11:15. Chargers 14–6. **Drive: 8 plays, 66 yards, 3:45.**
- KC – Woody Green 1-yard run (Jan Stenerud kick), 5:37. Chargers 14–13. **Drive: 4 plays, 16 yards, 1:37.**
- KC – Barry Pearson 17-yard pass from Len Dawson (Jan Stenerud kick), 3:42. Chiefs 20–14. **Drive: 3 plays, 16 yards, 0:16.**

**Fourth quarter**

- SD – Rickey Young 3-yard run (Ray Wersching kick), 14:02. Chargers 21–20. **Drive: 9 plays, 68 yards, 4:40.**
- SD – Dan Fouts 9-yard run (Ray Wersching kick), 7:58. Chargers 28–20. **Drive: 7 plays, 46 yards, 4:01.**

Top passers

- SD – Dan Fouts – 8/18, 168 yards, 3 INT
- KC – Len Dawson – 14/20, 154 yards, TD

Top rushers

- SD – Rickey Young – 25 rushes, 124 yards, 2 TD
- KC – Woody Green – 11 rushes, 32 yards, TD

Top receivers

- SD – Pat Curran – 3 receptions, 95 yards
- KC – Barry Pearson – 3 receptions, 61 yards, TD

==== Week 13: at Cleveland Browns ====
Week 13: Kansas City Chiefs at Cleveland Browns – Game summary

Quarter	1	2	3	4	Total
Chiefs	0	0	0	14	**14**
**Browns**	7	3	16	14	**40**

at Cleveland Municipal Stadium, Cleveland, Ohio

- Date: December 14
- Game time: 1:00 p.m. EST
- Game weather: Clear, 59 °F (15 °C)
- Game attendance: 44,368
- Referee: Tommy Bell
- TV announcers (NBC): Jay Randolph and Sam DeLuca
- Box score

Game information

**First quarter**

- CLE – Greg Pruitt 11-yard run (Don Cockroft kick), 0:54. Browns 7–0. **Drive: 9 plays, 56 yards, 4:44.**

**Second quarter**

- CLE – Don Cockroft 26-yard field goal, 5:15. Browns 10–0. **Drive: 8 plays, 78 yards, 3:00.**

**Third quarter**

- CLE – Hugh McKinnis 1-yard run (Don Cockroft kick), 4:31. Browns 17–0. **Drive: 3 plays, 5 yards, 1:07.**
- CLE – Charlie Getty tackled in end zone by Ron East for a Safety, 4:14. Browns 19–0.
- CLE – Greg Pruitt 3-yard run (Don Cockroft kick), 1:05. Browns 26–0. **Drive: 5 plays, 44 yards, 3:09.**

**Fourth quarter**

- CLE – Reggie Rucker 40-yard pass from Mike Phipps (Don Cockroft kick), 14:43. Browns 33–0. **Drive: 1 play, 40 yards, 0:09.**
- KC – Woody Green 1-yard run (Jan Stenerud kick), 10:04. Browns 33–7. **Drive: 11 plays, 77 yards, 4:39.**
- CLE – Greg Pruitt 14-yard run (Don Cockroft kick), 7:16. Browns 40–7. **Drive: 7 plays, 65 yards, 2:48.**
- KC – Billy Masters 9-yard pass from Tony Adams (Jan Stenerud kick), 2:06. Browns 40–14. **Drive: 11 plays, 80 yards, 5:10.**

Top passers

- KC – Tony Adams – 13/31, 141 yards, TD, INT
- CLE – Mike Phipps – 14/20, 204 yards, TD

Top rushers

- KC – Jeff Kinney – 10 rushes, 29 yards
- CLE – Greg Pruitt – 26 rushes, 214 yards, 3 TD

Top receivers

- KC – Woody Green – 4 receptions, 57 yards
- CLE – Reggie Rucker – 6 receptions, 130 yards, TD

==== Week 14: at Oakland Raiders ====
Week 14: Kansas City Chiefs at Oakland Raiders – Game summary

Quarter	1	2	3	4	Total
Chiefs	3	10	0	7	**20**
**Raiders**	7	14	0	7	**28**

at Oakland-Alameda County Coliseum, Oakland, California

- Date: December 21
- Game time: 1:00 p.m. PST
- Game weather: Cloudy, 53 °F (12 °C)
- Game attendance: 48,604
- Referee: Ben Dreith
- TV announcers (NBC): Jim Simpson and John Brodie
- Box score

Game information

**First quarter**

- OAK – Pete Banaszak 5-yard run (George Blanda kick), 8:08. Raiders 7–0. **Drive: 6 plays, 52 yards, 3:19.**
- KC – Jan Stenerud 35-yard field goal, 2:30. Raiders 7–3. **Drive: 12 plays, 58 yards, 5:38.**

**Second quarter**

- KC – Jan Stenerud 29-yard field goal, 11:01. Raiders 7–6. **Drive: 12 plays, 61 yards, 4:44.**
- KC – Barry Pearson 5-yard pass from Tony Adams (Jan Stenerud kick), 8:15. Chiefs 13–7. **Drive: 3 plays, 62 yards, 0:59.**
- OAK – Pete Banaszak 3-yard run (George Blanda kick), 4:06. Raiders 14–13. **Drive: 7 plays, 57 yards, 4:09.**
- OAK – Morris Bradshaw 16-yard pass from Ken Stabler (George Blanda kick), 1:13. Raiders 21–13. **Drive: 5 plays, 53 yards, 1:40.**

**Third quarter**

- No scoring plays.

**Fourth quarter**

- KC – Jeff Kinney 1-yard run (Jan Stenerud kick), 11:06. Raiders 21–20. **Drive: 10 plays, 80 yards, 4:06.**
- OAK – Pete Banaszak 1-yard run (George Blanda kick), 4:51. Raiders 28–20. **Drive: 3 plays, 6 yards, 1:21.**

Top passers

- KC – Tony Adams – 18/31, 245 yards, TD, 2 INT
- OAK – Ken Stabler – 11/12, 134 yards, TD

Top rushers

- KC – Woody Green – 17 rushes, 73 yards
- OAK – Jess Phillips – 7 rushes, 84 yards

Top receivers

- KC – Barry Pearson – 6 receptions, 103 yards, TD
- OAK – Cliff Branch – 1 reception, 30 yards

== Standings ==
AFC West
	W	L	T	PCT	DIV	CONF	PF	PA	STK
^{(2)} Oakland Raiders	11	3	0	.786	5–1	8–3	375	255	W1
Denver Broncos	6	8	0	.429	3–3	4–7	254	307	L1
Kansas City Chiefs	5	9	0	.357	3–3	3–8	282	341	L4
San Diego Chargers	2	12	0	.143	1–5	2–9	189	345	L1
