= Pat McNeil =

American football player (born 1954)

No. 45
- Position: Running back

Personal information
- Born: February 28, 1954 (age 72); Pittsburg, California, U.S.
- Listed height: 5 ft 9 in (1.75 m)
- Listed weight: 208 lb (94 kg)

Career information
- College: Baylor
- NFL draft: 1976: 17th round, 472nd overall pick

Career history
- 1976–1977: Kansas City Chiefs
- 1978: Edmonton Eskimos

Awards and highlights
- Grey Cup champion (1978)

Patrick Lamont McNeil (born February 28, 1954) is an American former professional football player who was a running back in the National Football League (CFL) and Canadian Football League (CFL). He played college football for the Baylor Bears. He was selected by the Kansas City Chiefs in 1976 NFL draft in the 17th round with the 472nd overall pick. He played during their 1976 and 1977 seasons.
