= MacArthur Lane =

American football player (1942–2019)

No. 36, 42
- Position: Running back

Personal information
- Born: March 16, 1942; Oakland, California, U.S.
- Died: May 4, 2019 (aged 77); Oakland, California, U.S.
- Listed height: 6 ft 1 in (1.85 m)
- Listed weight: 220 lb (100 kg)

Career information
- High school: Fremont (Oakland)
- College: Utah State
- NFL draft: 1968: 1st round, 13th overall pick

Career history
- St. Louis Cardinals (1968–1971); Green Bay Packers (1972–1974); Kansas City Chiefs (1975–1978)

Awards and highlights
- Pro Bowl (1970); NFL receptions leader (1976); NFL rushing touchdowns leader (1970)

Career NFL statistics
- Rushing yards: 4,656
- Rushing average: 3.9
- Receptions: 287
- Receiving yards: 2,786
- Total touchdowns: 37
- Stats at Pro Football Reference

MacArthur Lane (March 16, 1942 – May 4, 2019) was an American professional football player who was a running back in the National Football League (NFL) for eleven seasons, from 1968 to 1978 for the St. Louis Cardinals, Green Bay Packers, and Kansas City Chiefs. At age 36 and 199 days, he was the oldest running back ever to rush for more than 100 yards in an NFL game.

== Early life ==
Lane was born on March 16, 1942, less than four months after the United States entered World War II. He was born and raised in Oakland, California. Lane was named after United States Army General Douglas MacArthur.

Lane graduated from Oakland's Fremont High School in 1960, where he was all-city in football honors. As a junior (1958), the 185 pound (83.9 kg) Lane was considered the school's best running back. Playing running back in a September 1959 game, he had an 85-yard touchdown run. He was also a placekicker for the team. Lane also threw the shot put on the school's track and field team, and was a pole vaulter. He was the top shot-putter at the May 1960 Martinez relays.

His grades were not sufficient to attend college, and after graduating, Lane worked for over three years as a machinist (the first 2½ as a machinist's apprentice).

== College ==
Lane played his first season of college football at Merritt College and transferred to Utah State University in 1965.

After working for several years in a machine shop, Lane realized he was stagnating. During a flag football game at a recreation center, a friend told him he was too good to be playing flag football, and it dawned on Lane he could do more. He entered Merritt College in 1963, and joined the football team, where he played a number of positions. He played briefly at quarterback, and then switched to linebacker where he was named a junior college All-American. In 1964, he was selected Lineman of the Year in the Golden Gate Conference. He was also named at the same time to the Golden Gate Conference first-team defense, at linebacker.

Lane was recruited to Utah State. He transferred to Utah State in the Spring of 1965, and was on the football team 1965-67. Known as "Truck" at Utah State, Lane was a linebacker as a sophomore, also playing cornerback and both safety positions. He intercepted a pass in his first football game at Utah State. The team was plagued by injuries at running back during Lane's junior year, and Lane told head coach Tony Knap he had experience as a running back in high school. Knap moved Lane to running back as a junior, and he excelled after a slow start.

As a junior (1966), Lane gained 558 yards in only 73 rushing attempts, a 7.6 yards per carry average. As a senior (1967), he rushed for 634 yards on 98 carries (6.4 yards per carry). He averaged 6.9 yards per carry for his final two seasons. His 7.6 yards per carry as a junior was the highest in the nation for any college running back; and his 6.4 yards per carry the following year was 5th highest among all college running backs. In 1967, he was second in the nation to O. J. Simpson in rushing, when a torn thigh muscle caused him to miss his last four games. In a September 23, 1967 game against West Texas State, Lane ran for a career-high 207 yards on 20 carries, with two touchdowns. His 6.9 career yards per carry average ranks third in Utah State history for players with over 1,000 career yards (through 2024).

Lane even handled kickoffs (very successfully) for Utah State at times.

Utah State went from a 4–6 record in 1966 to 7–2–1 the following year. His teammates at Utah State included, among others, future NFL running back Altie Taylor and NFL defensive tackle Bill Staley.

Lane was selected to play in the August 1968 College All-Star Game against the Green Bay Packers in Chicago, receiving two votes for most valuable college player in the game.

Lane also was also a thrower for the Utah State Aggies track and field team. He won the shot put at an April 1966 meeting where his appearance was described as a surprise.

== Professional football ==
=== St. Louis Cardinals ===
The 26-year old Lane was the 13th overall selection in the first round of the 1968 NFL/AFL draft, taken by the St. Louis Cardinals. Lane was seldom used during his first two years in St. Louis (1968-69), totaling only 167 yards in 48 rushing attempts. The Cardinals intended to start Lane in his second year, but a series of injuries prevented this.

His breakout season came the following year (1970) when he rushed for 977 yards on 206 rushing attempts. His 11 rushing touchdowns led the NFL, and his 4.7 yards per carry was tied for third best in the league. He also had 32 receptions for 365 yards, and another two touchdowns. He was a Pro Bowl selection in 1970, and was named first team All-Pro by the Newspaper Enterprise Association (NEA), second-team All-Pro by the Pro Football Writers, and first-team All-conference by The Sporting News and United Press International (UPI).

Lane ran for 146 yards on 28 attempts, with two touchdowns, in the second game of the 1970 season against Washington. In the Cardinals' fourth game, he rushed 16 times for 132 yards, including a 74-yard touchdown run against the New Orleans Saints; with another 41 yards on three receptions. The following week, Lane had three rushing touchdowns and one touchdown reception (26 yards) against the Philadelphia Eagles; while rushing for 125 yards, including a 75-yard run.

Although he had a highly productive season, Lane was upset he did not reach 1,000 yards rushing, and believed he was denied this achievement because the team reduced his rushing attempts towards the end of the season. Lane and Washington's Larry Brown had been contending most of the season for the league rushing yardage lead. At the end of the season, however, Lane’s 977 yards rushing placed him third among 1970 NFL leaders, behind Brown (1,125) and the New York Giants' Ron Johnson (1,027).

In 1971, Lane ran for only 592 yards in 150 attempts, playing in 13 games. Despite personal statistical success with the Cardinals, Lane's time was marred by tension with head coaches Charley Winner and later Bob Hollway as well as team owner Bill Bidwill, mostly over disagreements regarding Lane's value. Playing the 1971 season without signing a contract (one of 12 Cardinals players doing so), he commented that the then-rotund Bidwill had "all his money in his stomach" and was suspended by the team for the final game of the season. Lane apologized for his comment, but Bidwill said Lane still had to be suspended as a matter of principle.

=== Green Bay Packers ===
After four seasons in St. Louis, Lane was traded to Green Bay in February 1972 for Donny Anderson. Hollway stated the trade was unrelated to the financial disputes with Lane. Lane said he was surprised as he believed the financial disputes had been put behind them, but he was happy with the trade. Anderson had also been having contract conflicts with the Packers and coach/general manager Dan Devine, and had similarly not signed a contract with them in 1971.

Lane joined 1971 rookie-of-the year running back John Brockington in the Packers backfield. The 6 ft 1 in (1.85 m) 225 pound (102 kg) Brockington had set a rookie rushing record (1,105 yards) in 1971. In 1972, Brockington (1,027) and Lane (821) combined for 1,848 yards rushing. Lane averaged 4.6 yards per carry in 177 attempts, and Brockington averaged 3.7 yards per carry in 274 attempts. Lane also had 26 pass receptions for 285 yards, giving him over 1,000 yards from scrimmage for the season.

The Packers won the division and returned to the playoffs for the first time since 1967. In the game deciding the NFC Central Division title, the Packers won 23–7 over the Minnesota Vikings, with Brockington rushing for 114 yards, and Lane for 99 yards. They were jointly named offensive players of the week. They lost to Washington in the first round of the playoffs, 16–3. Lane had 56 yards on 14 carries, but Brockington was held to only nine yards on 13 attempts.

The Packers fell to 5–7–2 the next season (1973). Brockington had over 1,000 yards for the third consecutive year (1,144 in 265 attempts), the first player to ever gain over 1,000 yards in his first three seasons. Lane had 528 yards in 170 attempts, while catching 27 passes for 255 yards. The 1974 Packers were 6–8. Lane had only 362 yards rushing, with a career-low 2.6 yards per carry average. He did catch 34 passes for 315 yards and three touchdowns. Brockington considered Lane an excellent blocking back, and Lane's ensuing trade to the Kansas City Chiefs had a negative impact on the Packer's rushing ability.

=== Kansas City Chiefs ===
Under new head coach Bart Starr in 1975, Lane was traded to Kansas City in July for a future draft pick. He played his final four seasons with the Chiefs. His best season with the Chiefs came during the 1976 season. Lane rushed for 542 yards, and led the NFL in receptions with 66 (for 686 yards). He had 1,228 yards from scrimmage with six touchdowns. During his final season, Lane recorded 144 yards rushing on October 1, 1978, in a 13–28 loss to the Buffalo Bills at age 36 years 199 days, a record that still stands for the oldest player with 100+ yards rushing in an NFL game (as of at least October 2019).

=== Career ===
When he retired before the start of the 1979 season, Lane was the oldest running back in the NFL. Over his 11-year NFL career, Lane had 4,656 yards in 1,206 attempts (3.8 yards per carry), 287 receptions for 2,786 yards (9.7 yards per reception) and 37 touchdowns. Lane was surprised he lasted 11 years in the NFL, in light of his physical style of play.

== NFL career statistics ==
Legend
	Led the league
**Bold**	Career high

=== Regular season ===
Year	Team	Games		Rushing					Receiving				
Year	Team	GP	GS	Att	Yds	Avg	Lng	TD	Rec	Yds	Avg	Lng	TD
1968	STL	14	0	23	74	3.2	11	0	0	0	0.0	0	0
1969	STL	9	0	25	93	3.7	13	1	9	61	6.8	14	0
1970	STL	14	14	**206**	**977**	4.7	**75**	**11**	32	365	11.4	**78**	2
1971	STL	13	11	150	592	3.9	40	3	29	298	10.3	34	0
1972	GNB	14	14	177	821	4.6	41	3	26	285	11.0	49	0
1973	GNB	13	13	170	528	3.1	20	1	27	255	9.4	30	1
1974	GNB	14	12	137	362	2.6	20	3	34	315	9.3	68	**3**
1975	KAN	9	7	79	311	3.9	39	2	25	202	8.1	31	0
1976	KAN	14	14	162	542	3.3	20	5	**66**	**686**	10.4	44	1
1977	KAN	3	3	25	79	3.2	9	1	3	40	**13.3**	21	0
1978	KAN	16	3	52	277	**5.3**	30	0	36	279	7.8	44	0
		133	91	1,206	4,656	3.9	75	30	287	2,786	9.7	78	7

=== Playoffs ===
Year	Team	Games		Rushing					Receiving				
Year	Team	GP	GS	Att	Yds	Avg	Lng	TD	Rec	Yds	Avg	Lng	TD
1972	GNB	1	1	14	56	4.0	18	0	4	42	10.5	22	0
		1	1	14	56	4.0	18	0	4	42	10.5	22	0

== Honors ==
Lane was inducted in the Utah State University Athletics Hall of Fame in 2008.

In 2008, the Oakland Tribune rated Lane among the top five athletes in Fremont High School history.

== Personal life ==
Because he was financially able on his football salary, Lane and his wife Edna took in her two step-siblings, saying "'If you can afford it, you gotta help out'". After retiring from football, he owned and managed rental properties and worked as a volunteer.

== Death ==
Lane died on May 4, 2019, in Oakland, at age 77. He was survived by his wife Edna.

Upon his death, Lane's close friend of nearly 50 years, Raymond Chester, said “Mac was one of those guys that everybody loved. He was smart as a whip, kindhearted and generous. As an athlete, he had to be one of the top ten greatest high school athletes ever in the Bay Area.”
