= Mark Bailey (American football) =

American football player (born 1954)

No. 39
- Position: Running back

Personal information
- Born: December 13, 1954 (age 71); Lynwood, California, U.S.
- Listed height: 6 ft 3 in (1.91 m)
- Listed weight: 237 lb (108 kg)

Career information
- College: Long Beach State
- NFL draft: 1977: 4th round, 92nd overall pick

Career history
- Kansas City Chiefs (1977–1978)

Career NFL statistics
- Games played: 27
- Rushing attempts: 149
- Rushing yards: 564
- Rushing average: 3.8
- Rushing touchdowns: 2
- Stats at Pro Football Reference

Mark Jeffrey Bailey (born December 13, 1954) is an American former professional football player who was a running back for two seasons with the Kansas City Chiefs of the National Football League (NFL). He played college football for the Long Beach State 49ers.

== Professional career ==
Bailey was selected 92nd overall in the fourth round of the 1977 NFL draft by the Kansas City Chiefs. He played two seasons, rushing for 564 yards on 149 carries. In 1979, he was traded to the Philadelphia Eagles, but the trade was voided as he refused to play for Philadelphia.

== NFL career statistics ==
Legend
**Bold**	Career high

=== Regular season ===
Year	Team	Games		Rushing					Receiving					Fumbles
Year	Team	GP	GS	Att	Yds	Avg	Lng	TD	Rec	Yds	Avg	Lng	TD	Fum
1977	KAN	**14**	4	66	266	**4.0**	**37**	**2**	**17**	**206**	**12.1**	**47**	**1**	**4**
1978	KAN	13	**5**	**83**	**298**	3.6	17	0	5	13	2.6	15	0	0
Career		27	9	149	564	3.8	37	2	22	219	10.0	47	1	4
