= Steve Taylor (safety) =

American football player (born 1953)

No. 48
- Position: Safety

Personal information
- Born: December 27, 1953 (age 72); Fort Worth, Texas, U.S.
- Listed height: 6 ft 3 in (1.91 m)
- Listed weight: 204 lb (93 kg)

Career information
- High school: Dunbar
- College: Kansas (1972–1975)
- NFL draft: 1976: 6th round, 166th overall pick

Career history
- Kansas City Chiefs (1976)

Career NFL statistics
- Games played: 14
- Games started: 1
- Stats at Pro Football Reference

Steven Lawrence Taylor (born December 27, 1953) is an American former professional football player who was a safety for the Kansas City Chiefs of the National Football League (NFL) in 1976. He played college football for the Kansas Jayhawks.
