= Darius Helton =

American gridiron football player (1954–2006)

No. 62
- Position: Guard

Personal information
- Born: October 2, 1954; Charlotte, North Carolina, U.S.
- Died: October 3, 2006 (aged 52); Charlotte, North Carolina, U.S.
- Listed height: 6 ft 2 in (1.88 m)
- Listed weight: 260 lb (118 kg)

Career information
- High school: Chapel Hill (NC)
- College: North Carolina Central
- NFL draft: 1977: 4th round, 95th overall pick

Career history
- Kansas City Chiefs (1977); BC Lions (1980)

Career NFL statistics
- Games played: 6
- Games started: 0
- Stats at Pro Football Reference

Darius Helton (October 2, 1954 – October 3, 2006) was an American professional football guard. He played for the Kansas City Chiefs in 1977 and for the BC Lions in 1980.
