= Mike Livingston =

American football player (born 1945)

No. 10
- Position: Quarterback

Personal information
- Born: November 14, 1945 (age 80); Dallas, Texas, U.S.
- Listed height: 6 ft 4 in (1.93 m)
- Listed weight: 212 lb (96 kg)

Career information
- High school: South Oak Cliff (Dallas)
- College: SMU
- NFL draft: 1968: 2nd round, 48th overall pick

Career history
- Kansas City Chiefs (1968–1979); Minnesota Vikings (1980); Oakland Invaders (1983)

Awards and highlights
- Super Bowl champion (IV); AFL champion (1969); AFL All-Star (1969)

Career NFL statistics
- Passing attempts: 1,751
- Passing completions: 912
- Completion percentage: 52.1%
- TD–INT: 56–83
- Passing yards: 11,295
- Passer rating: 63.3
- Rushing yards: 682
- Rushing touchdowns: 7
- Stats at Pro Football Reference

Michael Paul Livingston (born November 14, 1945) is an American former professional football player who was a quarterback for 12 seasons with the Kansas City Chiefs of the American Football League (AFL) and National Football League (NFL). He played college football for the SMU Mustangs.

== Early life ==
Born and raised in Dallas, Texas, Livingston graduated from its South Oak Cliff High School in 1964, and played college football at Southern Methodist University in Dallas under Mustangs head coach Hayden Fry, where he broke most of Don Meredith's passing records.

== Professional career ==
Livingston was a second round selection in the 1968 NFL/AFL draft, 48th overall, by the Kansas City Chiefs of the AFL. He was the fourth quarterback taken, after Greg Landry, Eldridge Dickey, and Heisman Trophy winner Gary Beban.

During the Chiefs' world championship season in 1969, starter Len Dawson and backup Jacky Lee went down with injuries, and Livingston started six games, threw for 1,123 yards, was 84 of 161, with four touchdowns, and the Chiefs won all six. Dawson returned in November, and they went on to win Super Bowl IV in New Orleans.

Livingston made 75 starts for the Chiefs, splitting time in the mid-1970s with Dawson, who retired in May 1976. The Chiefs' only head coach, Hank Stram, was fired after a 5–9 record in 1974. Under three head coaches, Livingston was the starter from 1975 until 1979, when he was pulled by Marv Levy in favor of rookie Steve Fuller, but made several starts.

On the roster of the Minnesota Vikings in 1980, Livingston saw no regular season action behind Tommy Kramer and Steve Dils. At age 37, he played in the United States Football League (USFL) in 1983 with the Oakland Invaders as a backup to Fred Besana under head coach John Ralston, then was waived in February 1984.

== See also ==
- Other American Football League players
