= Gary Barbaro =

American football player (born 1954)

No. 26
- Position: Safety

Personal information
- Born: February 11, 1954 (age 72); New Orleans, Louisiana, U.S.
- Listed height: 6 ft 4 in (1.93 m)
- Listed weight: 203 lb (92 kg)

Career information
- High school: East Jefferson (Metairie, Louisiana)
- College: Nicholls
- NFL draft: 1976: 3rd round, 74th overall pick

Career history
- Kansas City Chiefs (1976–1983); New Jersey Generals (1984)

Awards and highlights
- 3× Pro Bowl (1980–1982); All-USFL (1984); Kansas City Chiefs Hall of Fame

Career NFL statistics
- Interceptions: 39
- Fumble recoveries: 10
- Defensive touchdowns: 3
- Stats at Pro Football Reference

Gary Wayne Barbaro (born February 11, 1954) is an American former professional football player who was a safety for seven seasons in the National Football League (NFL) from 1976 to 1982 and one season in the United States Football League (USFL) in 1984. He played college football for the Nicholls Colonels and was selected in the third round of the 1976 NFL draft by the Kansas City Chiefs. He had 39 career interceptions and was selected to participate in three Pro Bowls.

== College career ==
Barbaro played just one year of high school football at East Jefferson High School in Metarie, Louisiana, instead spending most of his high school years playing trombone in the marching and jazz band. In 1971, he was recruited to play college football at Nicholls State University, which had recently added football that year. Originally a quarterback, Barbaro suffered from a sore arm and switched over to defensive back in his junior year. He was named All-Conference in 1975, helping Nicholls State to an 8–2 record and being selected to play in the Senior Bowl. He is a member of the school's Athletic Hall of Fame and the Louisiana Sports Hall of Fame.

== Professional career ==
Barbaro was selected by the Kansas City Chiefs in the third round of the 1976 NFL draft, becoming the first player in Nicholls State history ever to be selected in the NFL Draft. Replacing previous starter Mike Sensibaugh, Barbaro was mentored by defensive backs coach Tom Bettis, who taught him how to become a more efficient free safety.

The 6-foot-4, 200-pound Barbaro spent seven seasons with the Chiefs, earning Pro Bowl honors following the 1980, 1981, and 1982 seasons.

In 1976, Barbaro was named second-team All-NFL rookie team and won the Mack Lee Hill Award for best rookie in the Chiefs organization. In 1977, he had eight interceptions and led the NFL in interception return yards with 165, 102 of which he set in a December 1977 game against the Seattle Seahawks. That day, Barbaro intercepted a pass thrown by Jim Zorn in the end zone and returned it 102 yards for a touchdown, which, at the time broke an NFL record and is currently the Chiefs single-game record for longest interception return. In 1979, Barbaro intercepted seven passes and was the first ever honoree of the Kansas City Chiefs Most Valuable Player award. In 1980, he finished second in the league in interceptions with 10, behind Lester Hayes's 13, and was named second-team 1980 All-NFL by The Sporting News and second-team All-Pro by the Associated Press. In 1981 Barbaro had five interceptions for 134 yards while he was named first team All-Pro by the Pro Football Writers Association.

In November 1983, after sitting out the entire NFL season in a contract dispute, Barbaro signed a three-year contract with the New Jersey Generals of the USFL. In his only USFL season (1984), he was named to The Sporting News USFL All-Star Team. Barbaro tore his ACL in his left knee earlier in the season and missed four games, came back to play in the Generals' July 1984 USFL playoff loss to the Philadelphia Stars where he further injured the knee, ending his career.

In seven NFL seasons (1976–1982), Barbaro intercepted 39 passes, currently the fourth highest total in Chiefs history while his 771 career interception yards is second all-time, behind Hall of Famer Emmitt Thomas. He participated in every eligible game, 101 consecutive games in total, during his career.

== Retirement and personal life ==
Barbaro currently resides in Metarie, Louisiana where he works in the food service industry and is a uniform inspector in every New Orleans Saints home football game. On September 29, 2013, Barbaro became the 43rd member named to the Chiefs Hall of Fame by Chiefs chairman Clark Hunt.
