= Keith Simons =

American football player (1954–2017)

No. 72, 70
- Position: Defensive tackle

Personal information
- Born: April 26, 1954; Ypsilanti, Michigan, U.S.
- Died: July 26, 2017 (aged 63); Saint Paul, Minnesota, U.S.
- Listed height: 6 ft 3 in (1.91 m)
- Listed weight: 254 lb (115 kg)

Career information
- High school: Belleville (MI)
- College: Minnesota
- NFL draft: 1976: 3rd round, 63rd overall pick

Career history
- Kansas City Chiefs (1976–1977); St. Louis Cardinals (1978–1979)

Awards and highlights
- First-team All-Big Ten (1975); Second-team All-Big Ten (1974)

Career NFL statistics
- Sacks: 1.5
- Stats at Pro Football Reference

Keith Michael Simons (April 26, 1954 – July 26, 2017) was an American professional football player. He was a defensive tackle who played for the Kansas City Chiefs and St. Louis Cardinals of the National Football League (NFL). He played college football at the University of Minnesota. He was named to the Associated Press All-Big Ten team in 1975.

Simons was selected by the Chiefs with the 63rd pick in the third round of the 1976 NFL draft. He made his presence felt in his very first preseason game, when he blocked a field goal attempt in overtime and teammate Emmitt Thomas recovered the ball and returned it for a game winning touchdown. He was placed on the injured reserve list in October after tearing knee ligaments in a game against the Miami Dolphins. Simons played in 6 games for the Chiefs during the regular season in 1976, starting all 6. In 1977, he played in all 16 games for the Chiefs, again starting 6. The Chiefs traded him to the New Orleans Saints before the 1978 season but the Saints cut him before the season started. He was signed by the Cardinals in September 1978 and played two seasons for the Cardinals as a backup nose tackle, getting into 29 games. The Cardinals released him before the 1980 season. Diagnosed with bladder and lung cancer earlier in the year, he died on July 26, 2017, at the age of 63.
