= Willie Lee =

American football player (1950–2017)

No. 78
- Position: Defensive tackle

Personal information
- Born: July 13, 1950; Daytona Beach, Florida, U.S.
- Died: October 19, 2017 (aged 67); Fort Lauderdale, Florida, U.S.
- Listed height: 6 ft 5 in (1.96 m)
- Listed weight: 249 lb (113 kg)

Career information
- High school: Seabreeze (FL)
- College: Bethune–Cookman
- NFL draft: 1976: 5th round, 137th overall pick

Career history
- Kansas City Chiefs (1976–1977)

Career NFL statistics
- Sacks: 6
- Fumble recoveries: 4
- TDs: 1
- Stats at Pro Football Reference

Willie Lee (July 13, 1950 – October 19, 2017) was an American professional football defensive tackle in the National Football League (NFL) who played for the Kansas City Chiefs. He played college football for the Bethune–Cookman Wildcats.

Lee died in 2017.
