= Billy Masters (American football) =

American football player (born 1944)

No. 87, 81, 84
- Position: Tight end

Personal information
- Born: March 15, 1944 (age 82); Grayson, Louisiana, U.S.
- Listed height: 6 ft 5 in (1.96 m)
- Listed weight: 240 lb (109 kg)

Career information
- High school: LaSalle (Olla, Louisiana)
- College: LSU
- NFL draft: 1967: 3rd round, 77th overall pick

Career history
- Buffalo Bills (1967-1969); Denver Broncos (1970–1974); Kansas City Chiefs (1975–1976)

Career NFL/AFL statistics
- Receptions: 169
- Receiving yards: 2,268
- Touchdowns: 15
- Stats at Pro Football Reference

William Joel Masters (born March 15, 1944) is an American former professional football player who was a tight end in the American Football League (AFL) for the Buffalo Bills (1967–1969) and in the National Football League (NFL) for the Denver Broncos (1970–1974) and the Kansas City Chiefs (1975–1976). Masters played college football for the LSU Tigers in Baton Rouge, Louisiana.

Billy grew up in Olla, Louisiana and graduated from LaSalle High School.
