= Whitney Paul =

American football player (1953–2025)

No. 64, 53, 51
- Positions: Linebacker, defensive end

Personal information
- Born: October 8, 1953; Galveston, Texas, U.S.
- Died: December 3, 2025 (aged 72); Houston, Texas, U.S.
- Listed height: 6 ft 3 in (1.91 m)
- Listed weight: 220 lb (100 kg)

Career information
- High school: Ball (Galveston)
- College: Colorado
- NFL draft: 1976: 10th round, 277th overall pick

Career history
- Kansas City Chiefs (1976–1981); New Orleans Saints (1982–1985); Kansas City Chiefs (1986)

Career NFL statistics
- Sacks: 47
- Fumble recoveries: 10
- Interceptions: 11
- Defensive TDs: 2
- Stats at Pro Football Reference

Whitney Paul (October 8, 1953 – December 3, 2025) was an American professional football player who was a linebacker in the National Football League (NFL) for the Kansas City Chiefs and New Orleans Saints. He played college football for the Colorado Buffaloes.

Paul died at the University of Texas MD Anderson Cancer Center in Houston on December 3, 2025, at the age of 72.
