= Dave Rozumek =

American football player (born 1954)

No. 55
- Position: Linebacker

Personal information
- Born: April 25, 1954 (age 72); Lawrence, Massachusetts, U.S.
- Listed height: 6 ft 1 in (1.85 m)
- Listed weight: 215 lb (98 kg)

Career information
- High school: Lawrence
- College: New Hampshire
- NFL draft: 1976: 15th round, 415th overall pick

Career history
- Kansas City Chiefs (1976–1979)

Career NFL statistics
- Sacks: 1.5
- Fumble recoveries: 2
- Interceptions: 2
- Stats at Pro Football Reference

David John Rozumek (born April 25, 1954) is an American former professional football player who was a linebacker with the Kansas City Chiefs of the National Football League (NFL). He was selected by the Chiefs in the 15th round of the 1976 NFL draft after playing college football for the New Hampshire Wildcats.

== Early life and college ==
David John Rozumek was born on April 25, 1954, in Lawrence, Massachusetts. He attended Lawrence High School in Lawrence and played on the high school football team from 1968 to 1971. He earned The Eagle-Tribune All-Star honors as a defensive end his senior year.

He played college football for the Wildcats of the University of New Hampshire.

== Professional career ==
Rozumek was selected by the Kansas City Chiefs in the 15th round, with the 415th overall pick, of the 1976 NFL draft. He officially signed with the team on June 17. He was released on September 6 but re-signed on October 19. He played in eight games for the Chiefs during the 1976 season, recovering one fumble. Rozumek appeared in all 14 games in 1977. He then started all 16 games for the Chiefs in 1978, totaling 1.5 sacks, two interceptions, and one fumble recovery. The Chiefs finished the year with a 4–12 record. He played seven games during the 1979 season before being placed on injured reserve on October 31, 1979. He was released in 1980.

== Personal life ==
Rozumek served over 20 years in the Salem, New Hampshire school district and was the athletic director of Salem High School from 2008 to 2014, retiring in June 2014.
