= Walter White (American football) =

American football player (1951–2019)

No. 88
- Position: Tight end

Personal information
- Born: July 19, 1951; Charlottesville, Virginia, U.S.
- Died: April 10, 2019 (aged 67); Kansas City, Missouri, U.S.
- Listed height: 6 ft 3 in (1.91 m)
- Listed weight: 216 lb (98 kg)

Career information
- High school: Albemarle (VA)
- College: Maryland
- NFL draft: 1975: 3rd round, 78th overall pick

Career history
- Kansas City Chiefs (1975–1979)

Career NFL statistics
- Receptions: 163
- Receiving yards: 2,396
- Receiving touchdowns: 16
- Stats at Pro Football Reference

Walter Lee White (July 19, 1951 – April 10, 2019) was a professional American football tight end. White played college football at the University of Maryland, College Park. White was drafted in the third round with the 78th overall pick by the Pittsburgh Steelers in 1975. He was traded to the Kansas City Chiefs that offseason. In 1976 he ranked 7th in the NFL in receiving touchdowns with seven, and ninth in the NFL in overall receiving yardage with 808 yards, and in 1977 he was among the league leaders in pass receptions, 9th overall with 48. On April 10, 2019, White died of pancreatic cancer.
