= List of Kansas City Chiefs seasons =

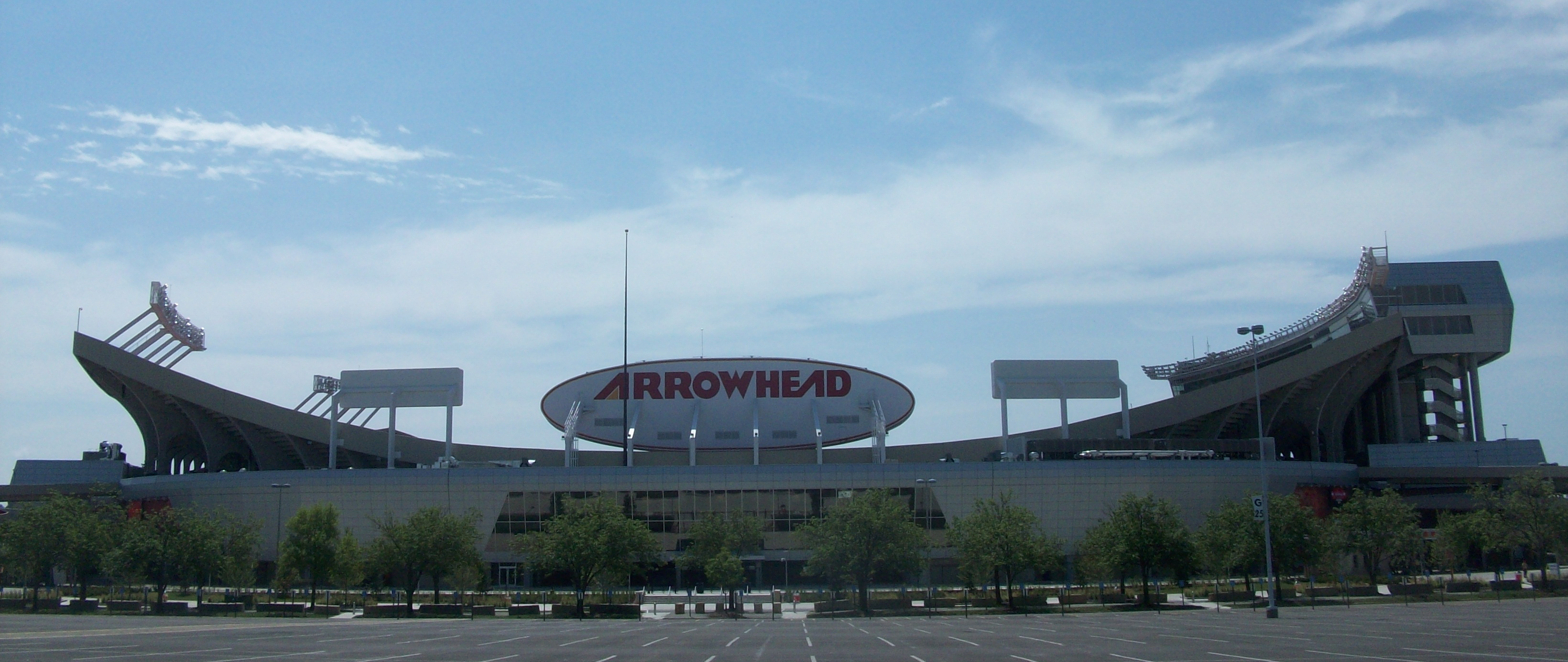
Arrowhead Stadium has served as the Chiefs' home stadium since 1972.

The Kansas City Chiefs have completed 65 seasons in professional American football and 55 with the National Football League (NFL). This article documents the season-by-season records of the Chiefs franchise from 1960 to the conclusion of their most recent season in 2025, including postseason records, and league awards for individual players or head coaches.

The team began play as a charter member of the American Football League (AFL) in 1960 as the Dallas Texans. In 1963, the team relocated to Kansas City, Missouri and was renamed the Kansas City Chiefs. The team has played in 983 total games in a total of 64 seasons, and a winning percentage of .553. The Chiefs' 15–2 season in 2024 remains their best regular season record to date while their 2–14 records in 2008 and 2012 remain their worst.

The Texans/Chiefs were the winningest team in the history of the AFL, compiling an 87–48 record from 1960 to 1969. The team won three league championships and served as the AFL's representative in Super Bowls I and IV in the 1966 and 1969 seasons. Since the franchise's alignment to the NFL in 1970, they have won 14 division titles, with eight straight from 2016 to 2023, and eight wild card playoff berths, four of which were between 1990 and 1997 when the team never lost as many games as it won. Despite the franchise's early success, the Chiefs did not win a postseason game between the 1993 and 2015 playoffs, and their Super Bowl IV victory on January 11, 1970, was the franchise's lone Super Bowl title until Super Bowl LIV on February 2, 2020. It was also a long drought between AFC Championship games, with their appearance in the 2018 playoffs being their first since 1993. The Chiefs' first home AFC Championship game ended in an overtime defeat as the New England Patriots moved on to win a record-tying sixth Super Bowl ring.

The Chiefs have suffered two main periods of failure. Between 1972 and 1985 the Chiefs never appeared in the postseason and achieved only one winning season (in 1981) from 1974 until 1985. Between 2007 and 2012, the Chiefs also struggled, with two two-win and two four-win seasons. However, the recent Chiefs have done much better, with an 161–61 record (including postseason) and recording more wins than losses every year from the 2013 to 2024 seasons. In their 11 seasons under Andy Reid, the Chiefs have ten consecutive playoff seasons and nine consecutive division titles. In addition, the team competed in five Super Bowls, with three wins (LIV, LVII, LVIII) and two losses (LV, LIX). Their victory in 2023 represented the first time since the 2004 New England Patriots a team repeated as champions, cementing their status as a sports dynasty.

== Seasons ==
AFL Champions (1960–1969)^{§}	Super Bowl champions (1966–present)^{†}	Conference champions^{*}	Division champions^{^}	Wild card berth^{#}	One-game playoff^{+}

Season	Team	League	Conference	Division	Regular season				Postseason results	Awards	Head coach
Season	Team	League	Conference	Division	Finish	W	L	T	Postseason results	Awards	Head coach
Dallas Texans
1960	1960	AFL		Western	2nd	8	6	0		Abner Haynes (UPI/AP AFL MVP)	Hank Stram
1961	1961	AFL		Western	2nd	6	8	0			Hank Stram
1962	1962	AFL^{§}		Western^{^}	1st^{^}	11	3	0	Won AFL Championship (1) (at Oilers) 20–17 (2 OT)	Len Dawson (TSN AFL MVP)	Hank Stram
Kansas City Chiefs
1963	1963	AFL		Western	3rd	5	7	2			Hank Stram
1964	1964	AFL		Western	2nd	7	7	0			Hank Stram
1965	1965	AFL		Western	3rd	7	5	2			Hank Stram
1966	1966	AFL^{§}		Western^{^}	1st^{^}	11	2	1	Won AFL Championship (at Bills) 31–7; Lost Super Bowl I (vs. Packers) 10–35		Hank Stram
1967	1967	AFL		Western	2nd	9	5	0			Hank Stram
1968	1968	AFL		Western	2nd (Note: The Chiefs and Oakland Raiders both finished the 1968 American Football League season with a 12–2 record. The teams played a one game playoff. The Raiders won the game and the Western Division championship.)	12	2	0	Lost Divisional Playoff (at Raiders) 6–41	Hank Stram (UPI/PFW AFL COY)	Hank Stram
1969	1969	AFL^{†}		Western	2nd^{#}	11	3	0	Won Divisional Playoffs (at Jets) 13–6; Won AFL Championship (at Raiders) 17–7; Won Super Bowl IV (2) (vs. Vikings) 23–7	Len Dawson (SB MVP)	Hank Stram
1970	1970	NFL	AFC	West	2nd	7	5	2			Hank Stram
1971	1971	NFL	AFC	West^{^}	1st^{^}	10	3	1	Lost Divisional Playoffs (Dolphins) 24–27 (2 OT)	Otis Taylor (AFC POY); Willie Lanier (PB Co–MVP) (Note: Lanier and Stenerud were named Defensive MVP and Offensive MVP of the 1972 Pro Bowl Jan Stenerud (PB Co–MVP))	Hank Stram
1972	1972	NFL	AFC	West	2nd	8	6	0		Willie Lanier (NFL MOY)	Hank Stram
1973	1973	NFL	AFC	West	2nd	7	5	2		Len Dawson (NFL MOY)	Hank Stram
1974	1974	NFL	AFC	West	3rd	5	9	0			Hank Stram
1975	1975	NFL	AFC	West	3rd	5	9	0			Paul Wiggin
1976	1976	NFL	AFC	West	4th	5	9	0			Paul Wiggin
1977	1977	NFL	AFC	West	5th	2	12	0			Paul Wiggin (1–6) Tom Bettis (1–6)
1978	1978 (Note: Beginning in 1978, the NFL schedule expanded to a 16-game regular season)	NFL	AFC	West	5th	4	12	0			Marv Levy
1979	1979	NFL	AFC	West	5th	7	9	0			Marv Levy
1980	1980	NFL	AFC	West	3rd	8	8	0			Marv Levy
1981	1981	NFL	AFC	West	3rd	9	7	0			Marv Levy
1982	1982	NFL	AFC		11th (Note: Due to the 1982 NFL Players Association strike, teams were ranked by conference instead of divisional standings.)	3	6	0			Marv Levy
1983	1983	NFL	AFC	West	5th	6	10	0			John Mackovic
1984	1984	NFL	AFC	West	4th	8	8	0		Bill Maas (DROY)	John Mackovic
1985	1985	NFL	AFC	West	5th	6	10	0			John Mackovic
1986	1986	NFL	AFC	West	2nd^{#}	10	6	0	Lost Wild Card Playoffs (at Jets) 15–35		John Mackovic
1987 (Note: Due to the 1987 NFL Players Association strike, the season was shortened to 15 games.)	1987	NFL	AFC	West	5th	4	11	0			Frank Gansz
1988	1988	NFL	AFC	West	5th	4	11	1			Frank Gansz
1989	1989	NFL	AFC	West	2nd	8	7	1		Derrick Thomas (DROY); Christian Okoye (OPOY)	Marty Schottenheimer
1990	1990	NFL	AFC	West	2nd^{#}	11	5	0	Lost Wild Card Playoffs (at Dolphins) 16–17	Barry Word (CPOY)	Marty Schottenheimer
1991	1991	NFL	AFC	West	2nd^{#}	10	6	0	Won Wild Card Playoffs (Raiders) 10–6; Lost Divisional Playoffs (at Bills) 14–37		Marty Schottenheimer
1992	1992	NFL	AFC	West	2nd^{#}	10	6	0	Lost Wild Card Playoffs (at Chargers) 0–17	Dale Carter (DROY)	Marty Schottenheimer
1993	1993	NFL	AFC	West^{^}	1st^{^}	11	5	0	Won Wild Card Playoffs (Steelers) 27–24 (OT); Won Divisional Playoffs (at Oilers) 28–20; Lost AFC Championship (at Bills) 13–30	Marcus Allen (CPOY); Derrick Thomas (MOY)	Marty Schottenheimer
1994	1994	NFL	AFC	West	2nd^{#}	9	7	0	Lost Wild Card Playoffs (at Dolphins) 17–27		Marty Schottenheimer
1995	1995	NFL	AFC	West^{^}	1st^{^}	13	3	0	Lost Divisional Playoffs (Colts) 7–10	Marty Schottenheimer (UPI COY)	Marty Schottenheimer
1996	1996	NFL	AFC	West	2nd	9	7	0			Marty Schottenheimer
1997	1997	NFL	AFC	West^{^}	1st^{^}	13	3	0	Lost Divisional Playoffs (Broncos) 10–14		Marty Schottenheimer
1998	1998	NFL	AFC	West	4th	7	9	0			Marty Schottenheimer
1999	1999	NFL	AFC	West	2nd	9	7	0			Gunther Cunningham
2000	2000	NFL	AFC	West	3rd	7	9	0			Gunther Cunningham
2001	2001	NFL	AFC	West	4th	6	10	0			Dick Vermeil
2002	2002	NFL	AFC	West	4th	8	8	0		Priest Holmes (OPOY)	Dick Vermeil
2003	2003	NFL	AFC	West^{^}	1st^{^}	13	3	0	Lost Divisional Playoffs (Colts) 31–38	Will Shields (MOY); Dick Vermeil (MFC COY)	Dick Vermeil
2004	2004	NFL	AFC	West	3rd	7	9	0			Dick Vermeil
2005	2005	NFL	AFC	West	2nd	10	6	0			Dick Vermeil
2006	2006	NFL	AFC	West	2nd^{#}	9	7	0	Lost Wild Card Playoffs (at Colts) 8–23		Herm Edwards
2007	2007	NFL	AFC	West	3rd	4	12	0			Herm Edwards
2008	2008	NFL	AFC	West	4th	2	14	0			Herm Edwards
2009	2009	NFL	AFC	West	4th	4	12	0		Brian Waters (MOY)	Todd Haley
2010	2010	NFL	AFC	West^{^}	1st^{^}	10	6	0	Lost Wild Card Playoffs (Ravens) 7–30		Todd Haley
2011	2011	NFL	AFC	West	4th	7	9	0			Todd Haley (5–8) Romeo Crennel (2–1)
2012	2012	NFL	AFC	West	4th	2	14	0			Romeo Crennel
2013	2013	NFL	AFC	West	2nd^{#}	11	5	0	Lost Wild Card Playoffs (at Colts) 44–45		Andy Reid
2014	2014	NFL	AFC	West	2nd	9	7	0			Andy Reid
2015	2015	NFL	AFC	West	2nd^{#}	11	5	0	Won Wild Card Playoffs (at Texans) 30–0; Lost Divisional Playoffs (at Patriots) 20–27	Marcus Peters (DROY); Eric Berry (CPOY)	Andy Reid
2016	2016	NFL	AFC	West^{^}	1st^{^}	12	4	0	Lost Divisional Playoffs (Steelers) 16–18		Andy Reid
2017	2017	NFL	AFC	West^{^}	1st^{^}	10	6	0	Lost Wild Card Playoffs (Titans) 21–22		Andy Reid
2018	2018	NFL	AFC	West^{^}	1st^{^}	12	4	0	Won Divisional Playoffs (Colts) 31–13; Lost AFC Championship (Patriots) 31–37 (OT)	Patrick Mahomes (MVP, OPOY)	Andy Reid
2019	2019	NFL^{†}	AFC^{*}	West^{^}	1st^{^}	12	4	0	Won Divisional Playoffs (Texans) 51–31; Won AFC Championship (Titans) 35–24; Won Super Bowl LIV (3) (vs. 49ers) 31–20	Patrick Mahomes (SB MVP)	Andy Reid
2020	2020	NFL	AFC^{*}	West^{^}	1st^{^}	14	2	0	Won Divisional Playoffs (Browns) 22–17; Won AFC Championship (Bills) 38–24; Lost Super Bowl LV (vs. Buccaneers) 9–31		Andy Reid
2021	2021 (Note: Beginning in 2021, the NFL schedule expanded to a 17-game regular season)	NFL	AFC	West^{^}	1st^{^}	12	5	0	Won Wild Card Playoffs (Steelers) 42–21; Won Divisional Playoffs (Bills) 42–36 (OT); Lost AFC Championship (Bengals) 24–27 (OT)		Andy Reid
2022	2022	NFL^{†}	AFC^{*}	West^{^}	1st^{^}	14	3	0	Won Divisional Playoffs (Jaguars) 27–20; Won AFC Championship (Bengals) 23–20; Won Super Bowl LVII (4) (vs. Eagles) 38–35	Patrick Mahomes (MVP, SB MVP)	Andy Reid
2023	2023	NFL^{†}	AFC^{*}	West^{^}	1st^{^}	11	6	0	Won Wild Card Playoffs (Dolphins) 26–7; Won Divisional Playoffs (at Bills) 27–24; Won AFC Championship (at Ravens) 17–10; Won Super Bowl LVIII (5) (vs. 49ers) 25–22 (OT)	Patrick Mahomes (SB MVP)	Andy Reid
2024	2024	NFL	AFC^{*}	West^{^}	1st^{^}	15	2	0	Won Divisional Playoffs (Texans) 23–14; Won AFC Championship (Bills) 32–29; Lost Super Bowl LIX (vs. Eagles) 22–40		Andy Reid
2025	2025	NFL	AFC	West	3rd	6	11	0			Andy Reid
Total						553	452	12	Regular season (1960–2025)		
Total						26	22	—	Postseason (1960–2025)		
Total						579	474	12	Overall (1960–2025)		
Total						4 Super Bowl titles, 3 AFL titles, 5 AFC titles, 17 division titles					
