= 1971 Kansas City Chiefs season =

NFL team season

- Owner: Lamar Hunt
- General manager: Jack Steadman
- Head coach: Hank Stram
- Home stadium: Municipal Stadium

Results
- Record: 10–3–1
- Division place: 1st AFC West
- Playoffs: Lost Divisional Playoffs (vs. Dolphins) 24–27 (2OT)
- Pro Bowlers: QB Len Dawson; WR Otis Taylor; G Ed Budde; OT Jim Tyrer; DT Curley Culp; DT Buck Buchanan; LB Bobby Bell; LB Willie Lanier; CB Emmitt Thomas; K Jan Stenerud; P Jerrel Wilson

The 1971 Kansas City Chiefs season was the franchise's second season in the National Football League (NFL), ninth as the Kansas City Chiefs, and twelfth overall. They improved from a 7–5–2 campaign in 1970 to record a 10–3–1 mark and win the AFC West division championship, the Chiefs' first division title since 1966 and last until 1993. The Chiefs tied with the Miami Dolphins for the best record in the AFC and were tied for the third-best record overall in the NFL, trailing only the 11–3 marks of the Dallas Cowboys and Minnesota Vikings.

The Chiefs' playoff loss to Miami remains the longest game in NFL history at 82 minutes and forty seconds. Dolphins kicker Garo Yepremian made a 37-yard field goal with seven minutes and twenty seconds left in the second overtime to win the game.

1971 marked the end of an era, as the last remaining original Texan/Chief, longtime player Johnny Robinson, retired after all 10 seasons in the AFL, 2 seasons in the NFL, and 12 seasons with the Texans/Chiefs.

== Season summary ==
Most of the pieces of the team which won Super Bowl IV two years earlier were still in place. Left defensive end Jerry Mays retired after the 1970 season, with Marvin Upshaw taking his spot, but the other ten defensive starters were the same as they were two years prior. Middle linebacker Willie Lanier was a unanimous All-Pro selection following the season, and would likely have been named NFL Defensive Player of the Year had not Viking defensive tackle Alan Page become the second defensive player to win the league's Most Valuable Player award. Outside linebacker Bobby Bell, defensive tackles Buck Buchanan and Curley Culp, and cornerback Emmitt Thomas joined Lanier on the AFC Pro Bowl squad following the season. Bell, Buchanan, Culp, Lanier, and Thomas are all members of the Pro Football Hall of Fame.

On offense, Robert Holmes was traded to the San Diego Chargers midway through the season, leaving Wendell Hayes to assume the fullback duties next to third-year pro Ed Podolak, who had become the starting halfback when Mike Garrett was traded to San Diego in 1970. Morris Stroud, the tallest player in NFL history at 6 ft 10 in (2.08 m), and Willie Frazier, acquired from San Diego, alternated at tight end for the retired Fred Arbanas, but the rest of the offensive line, save for center Jack Rudnay, remained the same from the Super Bowl winning team. Rudnay assumed the starting center spot in 1970 over veteran E. J. Holub. At wide receiver, rookie Elmo Wright, the Chiefs' first-round pick in the 1971 NFL draft from the University of Houston, assumed the slot opposite all-pro Otis Taylor, as Frank Pitts had moved on to the Cleveland Browns. Taylor earned selection to the Pro Bowl, along with guard Ed Budde, quarterback Len Dawson, and tackle Jim Tyrer.

Kansas City's special teams remained among the league's elite units, thanks to the combination of kicker Jan Stenerud and punter Jerrel Wilson, both of whom were named to the Pro Bowl. Podolak and Warren McVea handled the bulk of the return duties.

The season was the last for the Chiefs in Municipal Stadium; owner Lamar Hunt and general manager Jack Steadman were overseeing the construction of Arrowhead Stadium, located at the junction of Interstates 70 and 435 in Jackson County, at the eastern edge of the Kansas City city limits. Arrowhead, along with Royals Stadium, being constructed for the Kansas City Royals of Major League Baseball, comprised the Truman Sports Complex, bucking the trend of multi-purpose stadiums in vogue at the time.

The season ended as the Miami Dolphins won the longest game in National Football League history on Christmas Day, defeating the Chiefs 27–24 in double-overtime on a 37-yard field goal by Garo Yepremian in the last football game in Municipal Stadium, as well as the last game for safety Johnny Robinson, who was an original member of the franchise as a rookie on the 1960 Dallas Texans. Head coach Hank Stram often called the 1971 Chiefs the franchise's best-ever squad, and the home playoff loss haunted Stram for the rest of his life, even after his induction into the Pro Football Hall of Fame in 2003; Stram died in 2005 at age 82. Others in the Hall of Fame from this squad are owner Hunt, quarterback Dawson, and kicker Stenerud.

The loss to Miami began a nosedive in the Chiefs' fortunes. Kansas City backslid to 8–6 and 7–5–2 in 1972 and 1973, before falling to 5–9 and a tie for last in the AFC West in 1974, leading to Stram's firing following the season. Kansas City did not reach the playoffs again until 1986, did not host (or win) another playoff game until 1991, and did not win the AFC West division title again until 1993.

== NFL draft ==
1971 Kansas City Chiefs Draft
Round	Selection	Player	Position	College
1	16	Elmo Wright	Wide receiver	Houston
2	39	Wilbur Young	Defensive tackle	William Penn
2	42	Scott Lewis	Defensive end	Grambling
4	94	David Robinson	Tight end	Jacksonville State
5	120	Mike Adamle	Running back	Northwestern
6	146	Kerry Reardon	Defensive back	Iowa
8	191	Mike Sensibaugh	Defensive back	Ohio State
8	198	Rick Telander	Defensive back	Northwestern
9	224	Alvin Hawes	Tackle	Minnesota
10	250	Bruce Jankowski	Wide receiver	Ohio State
11	276	Nate Allen	Defensive back	Texas Southern
12	302	Tony Esposito	Running back	Pittsburgh
13	328	Chuck Hixson	Quarterback	SMU
14	354	Bruce Bergey	Defensive end	UCLA
15	380	Mike Montgomery	Defensive back	Southwest Texas State
16	406	Darrell Jansonius	Guard	Iowa State
17	431	Travis Hill	Defensive back	Prairie View A&M

== Roster ==
1971 Kansas City Chiefs roster
Quarterbacks (QB): 16 Len Dawson; 7 John Huarte; 10 Mike Livingston; Running backs (RB): 1 Mike Adamle; 38 Wendell Hayes; 6 Warren McVea; 35 Jim Otis; 14 Ed Podolak; Wide receivers (WR): 21 Dennis Homan; 89 Otis Taylor; 17 Elmo Wright; Tight ends (TE): 83 Willie Frazier; 88 Morris Stroud	Offensive linemen (OL): 71 Ed Budde G; 60 George Daney G; 73 Dave Hill T; 61 Mo Moorman G; 50 Mike Oriard C; 58 Jack Rudnay C; 70 Sid Smith T; 77 Jim Tyrer T; Defensive linemen (DL): 87 Aaron Brown DE; 86 Buck Buchanan DT; 61 Curley Culp DT; 82 Ed Lothamer DT; 81 Marvin Upshaw DE; 99 Wilbur Young DE	Linebackers (LB): 78 Bobby Bell OLB; 24 Caesar Belser OLB; 63 Willie Lanier MLB; 51 Jim Lynch OLB; 66 Bob Stein MLB; Defensive backs (DB): 23 David Hadley CB; 46 Jim Kearney SS; 40 Jim Marsalis CB; 15 Kerry Reardon CB/S; 42 Johnny Robinson FS; 18 Emmitt Thomas CB; Special teams (ST): 3 Jan Stenerud K; 44 Jerrel Wilson P	Practice squad: 48 Nate Allen CB; 11 Mike Eischeid P; 12 Chuck Hixson QB; 41 Bruce Jankowski WR; 20 Mike Sensibaugh S; Reserve: 79 Larry Gagner G (IR); 55 E. J. Holub C (IR); 54 Clyde Werner LB (IR); Rookies in italics

== Preseason ==
Week	Date	Opponent	Result	Record	Venue	Attendance	Recap
1	August 7	at Baltimore Colts	W 10–7	1–0	Memorial Stadium	16,771	Recap
2	August 14	Atlanta Falcons	W 12–10	2–0	Municipal Stadium	37,403	Recap
3	August 21	at New Orleans Saints	W 27–7	3–0	Tulane Stadium	70,459	Recap
4	August 30	New York Jets	W 21–16	4–0	Municipal Stadium	37,650	Recap
5	September 4	St. Louis Cardinals	T 17–17	4–0–1	Municipal Stadium	36,743	Recap
6	September 11	at Dallas Cowboys	L 17–24	4–1–1	Cotton Bowl	74,035	Recap

== Regular season ==
=== Schedule ===
Week	Date	Opponent	Result	Record	Venue	Attendance	Recap
1	September 19	at **San Diego Chargers**	**L** 14–21	0–1	San Diego Stadium	54,061	Recap
2	September 26	at Houston Oilers	**W** 20–16	1–1	Houston Astrodome	46,498	Recap
3	October 3	at **Denver Broncos**	**W** 16–3	2–1	Mile High Stadium	51,200	Recap
4	October 10	**San Diego Chargers**	**W** 31–10	3–1	Municipal Stadium	50,514	Recap
5	October 18	Pittsburgh Steelers	**W** 38–16	4–1	Municipal Stadium	49,533	Recap
6	October 24	Washington Redskins	**W** 27–20	5–1	Municipal Stadium	51,989	Recap
7	October 31	at **Oakland Raiders**	**T** 20–20	5–1–1	Oakland–Alameda County Coliseum	54,715	Recap
8	November 7	at New York Jets	**L** 10–13	5–2–1	Shea Stadium	62,812	Recap
9	November 14	Cleveland Browns	**W** 13–7	6–2–1	Municipal Stadium	50,388	Recap
10	November 21	**Denver Broncos**	**W** 28–10	7–2–1	Municipal Stadium	49,945	Recap
11	November 25	at Detroit Lions	**L** 21–32	7–3–1	Tiger Stadium	54,418	Recap
12	December 6	at San Francisco 49ers	**W** 26–17	8–3–1	Candlestick Park	45,306	Recap
13	December 12	**Oakland Raiders**	**W** 16–14	9–3–1	Municipal Stadium	51,215	Recap
14	December 19	Buffalo Bills	**W** 22–9	10–3–1	Municipal Stadium	48,121	Recap
Note: Intra-division opponents are in **bold** text.

=== Game summaries ===
==== Week 1: at San Diego Chargers ====
Week 1: Kansas City Chiefs at San Diego Chargers – Game summary

Quarter	1	2	3	4	Total
Chiefs	7	7	0	0	**14**
**Chargers**	0	0	7	14	**21**

at San Diego Stadium, San Diego, California

- Date: September 19
- Game time: 1:00 p.m. PDT
- Game weather: 73 °F (23 °C)
- Game attendance: 54,381
- Referee: Ben Dreith
- TV announcers (NBC): Jay Randolph and Willie Davis
- Recap

Game information

**First quarter**

- KC – Warren McVea 6-yard run (Jan Stenerud kick). Chiefs 7–0.

**Second quarter**

- KC – Ed Podolak 1-yard run (Jan Stenerud kick). Chiefs 14–0.

**Third quarter**

- SD – Mike Montgomery 39-yard pass from John Hadl (Dennis Partee kick). Chiefs 14–7.

**Fourth quarter**

- SD – Jerry LeVias 37-yard pass from John Hadl (Dennis Partee kick). Tied 14–14.
- SD – Mike Garrett 26-yard run (Dennis Partee kick). Chargers 21–14.

**Top passers**

- KC – Len Dawson – 11/22, 152 yards, 2 INT
- SD – John Hadl – 17/37, 260 yards, 2 TD, INT

**Top rushers**

- KC – Ed Podolak – 17 rushes, 65 yards
- SD – Mike Garrett – 15 rushes, 59 yards, TD

**Top receivers**

- KC – Otis Taylor – 3 receptions, 76 yards
- SD – Gary Garrison – 4 receptions, 72 yards

==== Week 2: at Houston Oilers ====
Week 2: Kansas City Chiefs at Houston Oilers – Game summary

Quarter	1	2	3	4	Total
**Chiefs**	10	3	0	7	**20**
Oilers	0	7	3	6	**16**

at Houston Astrodome, Houston, Texas

- Date: September 26
- Game time: 1:00 p.m. CDT
- Game weather: None (indoor stadium)
- Game attendance: 46,498
- Referee: Fred Swearingen
- TV announcers (NBC): Charlie Jones and George Ratterman
- Recap

Game information

**First quarter**

- KC – Wendell Hayes 1-yard run (Jan Stenerud kick). Chiefs 7–0.
- KC – Jan Stenerud 43-yard field goal. Chiefs 10–0.

**Second quarter**

- HOU – Ken Houston 68-yard fumble return (Braden Beck kick). Chiefs 10–7.
- KC – Jan Stenerud 11-yard field goal. Chiefs 13–7.

**Third quarter**

- HOU – Braden Beck 15-yard field goal. Chiefs 13–10.

**Fourth quarter**

- HOU – Charlie Joiner 12-yard pass from Dan Pastorini (kick failed). Oilers 16–13.
- KC – Warren McVea 4-yard run (Jan Stenerud kick). Chiefs 20–16.

**Top passers**

- KC – Len Dawson – 14/24, 207 yards
- HOU – Dan Pastorini – 10/21, 156 yards, TD, 2 INT

**Top rushers**

- KC – Warren McVea – 15 rushes, 45 yards, TD
- HOU – Joe Dawkins – 13 rushes, 16 yards

**Top receivers**

- KC – Otis Taylor – 6 receptions, 97 yards
- HOU – Ken Burrough – 2 receptions, 49 yards

==== Week 3: at Denver Broncos ====
Week 3: Kansas City Chiefs at Denver Broncos – Game summary

Quarter	1	2	3	4	Total
**Chiefs**	0	10	0	6	**16**
Broncos	3	0	0	0	**3**

at Mile High Stadium, Denver, Colorado

- Date: October 3
- Game time: 2:00 p.m. MDT
- Game weather: 47 °F (8 °C)
- Game attendance: 51,200
- Referee: Norm Schachter
- TV announcers (NBC): Ross Porter and Dave Kocourek
- Recap

Game information

**First quarter**

- DEN – Jim Turner 37-yard field goal. Broncos 3–0.

**Second quarter**

- KC – Aaron Brown 68-yard interception return (Jan Stenerud kick). Chiefs 7–3.
- KC – Jan Stenerud 20-yard field goal. Chiefs 10–3.

**Third quarter**

- No scoring plays.

**Fourth quarter**

- KC – Jan Stenerud 26-yard field goal. Chiefs 13–3.
- KC – Jan Stenerud 16-yard field goal. Chiefs 16–3.

**Top passers**

- KC – Len Dawson – 9/21, 91 yards, INT
- DEN – Don Horn – 14/27, 168 yards, 4 INT

**Top rushers**

- KC – Ed Podolak – 15 rushes, 38 yards
- DEN – Bobby Anderson – 11 rushes, 34 yards

**Top receivers**

- KC – Morris Stroud – 1 reception, 50 yards
- DEN – Jim Whalen – 3 receptions, 71 yards

==== Week 4: vs. San Diego Chargers ====
Week 4: San Diego Chargers at Kansas City Chiefs – Game summary

Quarter	1	2	3	4	Total
Chargers	3	7	0	0	**10**
**Chiefs**	0	10	7	14	**31**

at Municipal Stadium, Kansas City, Missouri

- Date: October 10
- Game time: 1:00 p.m. CDT
- Game weather: 53 °F (12 °C)
- Game attendance: 50,514
- Referee: Norm Schachter
- TV announcers (NBC): Ross Porter and Willie Davis
- Recap

Game information

**First quarter**

- SD – Dennis Partee 43-yard field goal. Chargers 3–0.

**Second quarter**

- SD – Mike Garrett 3-yard pass from John Hadl (Dennis Partee kick). Chargers 10–0.
- KC – Jim Otis 3-yard pass from Len Dawson (Jan Stenerud kick). Chargers 10–7.
- KC – Jan Stenerud 29-yard field goal. Tied 10–10.

**Third quarter**

- KC – Otis Taylor 15-yard pass from Len Dawson (Jan Stenerud kick). Chiefs 17–10.

**Fourth quarter**

- KC – Warren McVea 15-yard run (Jan Stenerud kick). Chiefs 24–10.
- KC – Ed Podolak 7-yard run (Jan Stenerud kick). Chiefs 31–10.

**Top passers**

- SD – John Hadl – 12/23, 135 yards, TD, 2 INT
- KC – Len Dawson – 16/23, 188 yards, 2 TD

**Top rushers**

- SD – Mike Garrett – 7 rushes, 44 yards
- KC – Warren McVea – 11 rushes, 80 yards

**Top receivers**

- SD – Gary Garrison – 1 reception, 36 yards
- KC – Otis Taylor – 6 receptions, 97 yards, TD

==== Week 5: vs. Pittsburgh Steelers ====
Week 5: Pittsburgh Steelers at Kansas City Chiefs – Game summary

Quarter	1	2	3	4	Total
Steelers	9	0	0	7	**16**
**Chiefs**	0	28	0	10	**38**

at Municipal Stadium, Kansas City, Missouri

- Date: October 18
- Game time: 8:00 p.m. CDT
- Game weather: 73 °F (23 °C)
- Game attendance: 49,533
- Referee: Pat Haggerty
- TV announcers (ABC): Frank Gifford, Don Meredith and Howard Cosell
- Recap

Game information

**First quarter**

- PIT – Roy Gerela 43-yard field goal. Steelers 3–0.
- PIT – Roy Gerela 40-yard field goal. Steelers 6–0.
- PIT – Roy Gerela 35-yard field goal. Steelers 9–0.

**Second quarter**

- KC – Otis Taylor 3-yard pass from Len Dawson (Jan Stenerud kick). Steelers 9–7.
- KC – Otis Taylor 27-yard pass from Len Dawson (Jan Stenerud kick). Chiefs 14–9.
- KC – Elmo Wright 5-yard pass from Len Dawson (Jan Stenerud kick). Chiefs 21–9.
- KC – Ed Podolak 1-yard run (Jan Stenerud kick). Chiefs 28–9.

**Third quarter**

- No scoring plays.

**Fourth quarter**

- KC – Jan Stenerud 11-yard field goal. Chiefs 31–9.
- PIT – John Fuqua 1-yard run (Roy Gerela kick). Chiefs 31–16.
- KC – Emmitt Thomas 32-yard interception return (Jan Stenerud kick). Chiefs 38–16.

**Top passers**

- PIT – Terry Bradshaw – 20/39, 269 yards, 2 INT
- KC – Len Dawson – 14/26, 290 yards, 3 TD, INT

**Top rushers**

- PIT – Terry Bradshaw – 9 rushes, 37 yards
- KC – Ed Podolak – 20 rushes, 43 yards, TD

**Top receivers**

- PIT – Dave Smith – 5 receptions, 93 yards
- KC – Otis Taylor – 6 receptions, 190 yards, 2 TD

==== Week 6: vs. Washington Redskins ====
Week 6: Washington Redskins at Kansas City Chiefs – Game summary

Quarter	1	2	3	4	Total
Redskins	7	10	0	3	**20**
**Chiefs**	3	3	7	14	**27**

at Municipal Stadium, Kansas City, Missouri

- Date: October 24
- Game time: 3:00 p.m. CDT
- Game weather: 62 °F (17 °C)
- Game attendance: 51,989
- Referee: Jack Vest
- TV announcers (CBS): Ray Scott, Pat Summerall and Ron Barr
- Recap

Game information

**First quarter**

- WAS – Charley Taylor 4-yard pass from Billy Kilmer (Curt Knight kick). Redskins 7–0.
- KC – Jan Stenerud 39-yard field goal. Redskins 7–3.

**Second quarter**

- KC – Jan Stenerud 15-yard field goal. Redskins 7–6.
- WAS – Curt Knight 33-yard field goal. Redskins 10–6.
- WAS – Charley Taylor 36-yard pass from Billy Kilmer (Curt Knight kick). Redskins 17–6.

**Third quarter**

- KC – Otis Taylor 25-yard pass from Len Dawson (Jan Stenerud kick). Redskins 17–13.

**Fourth quarter**

- WAS – Curt Knight 23-yard field goal. Redskins 20–13.
- KC – Elmo Wright 15-yard pass from Len Dawson (Jan Stenerud kick). Tied 20–20.
- KC – Otis Taylor 28-yard pass from Len Dawson (Jan Stenerud kick). Chiefs 27–20.

**Top passers**

- WAS – Billy Kilmer – 15/38, 220 yards, 2 TD, INT
- KC – Len Dawson – 10/23, 203 yards, 3 TD, 2 INT

**Top rushers**

- WAS – Charley Harraway – 12 rushes, 58 yards
- KC – Ed Podolak – 24 rushes, 110 yards

**Top receivers**

- WAS – Charley Taylor – 7 receptions, 125 yards, 2 TD
- KC – Otis Taylor – 5 receptions, 105 yards, 2 TD

==== Week 7: at Oakland Raiders ====
Week 7: Kansas City Chiefs at Oakland Raiders – Game summary

Quarter	1	2	3	4	Total
Chiefs	7	7	3	3	**20**
Raiders	3	7	0	10	**20**

at Oakland–Alameda County Coliseum, Oakland, California

- Date: October 31
- Game time: 1:00 p.m. PST
- Game weather: 52 °F (11 °C)
- Game attendance: 54,715
- Referee: Tommy Bell
- TV announcers (NBC): Curt Gowdy and Al DeRogatis
- Recap

Game information

**First quarter**

- KC – Ed Podolak 1-yard run (Jan Stenerud kick). Chiefs 7–0.
- OAK – George Blanda 17-yard field goal. Chiefs 7–3.

**Second quarter**

- OAK – Marv Hubbard 1-yard run (George Blanda kick). Raiders 10–7.
- KC – Ed Podolak 2-yard run (Jan Stenerud kick). Chiefs 14–10.

**Third quarter**

- KC – Jan Stenerud 12-yard field goal. Chiefs 17–10.

**Fourth quarter**

- KC – Jan Stenerud 37-yard field goal. Chiefs 20–10.
- OAK – Fred Biletnikoff 24-yard pass from George Blanda (George Blanda kick). Chiefs 20–17.
- OAK – George Blanda 8-yard field goal. Tied 20–20.

**Top passers**

- KC – Len Dawson – 7/13, 133 yards, INT
- OAK – Daryle Lamonica – 10/22, 162 yards, 2 INT

**Top rushers**

- KC – Ed Podolak – 13 rushes, 71 yards, 2 TD
- OAK – Marv Hubbard – 17 rushes, 48 yards, TD

**Top receivers**

- KC – Otis Taylor – 3 receptions, 70 yards
- OAK – Fred Biletnikoff – 7 receptions, 128 yards, TD

==== Week 8: at New York Jets ====
Week 8: Kansas City Chiefs at New York Jets – Game summary

Quarter	1	2	3	4	Total
Chiefs	7	3	0	0	**10**
**Jets**	7	3	0	3	**13**

at Shea Stadium, New York, New York

- Date: November 7
- Game time: 1:00 p.m. EST
- Game weather: 53 °F (12 °C)
- Game attendance: 62,812
- Referee: Dick Jorgensen
- TV announcers (NBC): Curt Gowdy and Al DeRogatis
- Recap

Game information

**First quarter**

- NYJ – Emerson Boozer 1-yard run (Bobby Howfield kick). Jets 7–0.
- KC – Mike Adamle 6-yard pass from Len Dawson (Jan Stenerud kick). Tied 7–7.

**Second quarter**

- NYJ – Bobby Howfield 30-yard field goal. Jets 10–7.
- KC – Jan Stenerud 19-yard field goal. Tied 10–10.

**Third quarter**

- No scoring plays.

**Fourth quarter**

- NYJ – Bobby Howfield 39-yard field goal. Jets 13–10.

**Top passers**

- KC – Len Dawson – 13/25, 111 yards, TD, 2 INT
- NYJ – Bob Davis – 3/9, 19 yards

**Top rushers**

- KC – Warren McVea – 11 rushes, 39 yards
- NYJ – John Riggins – 11 rushes, 63 yards

**Top receivers**

- KC – Otis Taylor – 2 receptions, 35 yards
- NYJ – Don Maynard – 2 receptions, 24 yards

==== Week 9: vs. Cleveland Browns ====
Week 9: Cleveland Browns at Kansas City Chiefs – Game summary

Quarter	1	2	3	4	Total
Browns	0	0	0	7	**7**
**Chiefs**	3	10	0	0	**13**

at Municipal Stadium, Kansas City, Missouri

- Date: November 14
- Game time: 3:00 p.m. CST
- Game weather: 66 °F (19 °C)
- Game attendance: 50,388
- Referee: Bernie Ulman
- TV announcers (NBC): Curt Gowdy and Al DeRogatis
- Recap

Game information

**First quarter**

- KC – Jan Stenerud 14-yard field goal. Chiefs 3–0.

**Second quarter**

- KC – Jan Stenerud 27-yard field goal. Chiefs 6–0.
- KC – Wendell Hayes 26-yard pass from Len Dawson (Jan Stenerud kick). Chiefs 13–0.

**Third quarter**

- No scoring plays.

**Fourth quarter**

- CLE – Milt Morin 18-yard pass from Bill Nelsen (Don Cockroft kick). Chiefs 13–7.

**Top passers**

- CLE – Bill Nelsen – 7/11, 130 yards, TD
- KC – Len Dawson – 15/24, 234 yards, TD

**Top rushers**

- CLE – Leroy Kelly – 9 rushes, 30 yards
- KC – Ed Podolak – 20 rushes, 69 yards

**Top receivers**

- CLE – Frank Pitts – 5 receptions, 129 yards
- KC – Otis Taylor – 3 receptions, 66 yards

==== Week 10: vs. Denver Broncos ====
Week 10: Denver Broncos at Kansas City Chiefs – Game summary

Quarter	1	2	3	4	Total
Broncos	3	0	0	7	**10**
**Chiefs**	14	7	7	0	**28**

at Municipal Stadium, Kansas City, Missouri

- Date: November 21
- Game time: 1:00 p.m. CST
- Game weather: 44 °F (7 °C)
- Game attendance: 49,945
- Referee: John McDonough
- TV announcers (NBC): Jay Randolph and George Ratterman
- Recap

Game information

**First quarter**

- KC – Morris Stroud 39-yard pass from Len Dawson (Jan Stenerud kick). Chiefs 7–0.
- KC – Elmo Wright 69-yard pass from Len Dawson (Jan Stenerud kick). Chiefs 14–0.
- DEN – Jim Turner 12-yard field goal. Chiefs 14–3.

**Second quarter**

- KC – Ed Podolak 17-yard run (Jan Stenerud kick). Chiefs 21–3.

**Third quarter**

- KC – Jim Otis 12-yard pass from Len Dawson (Jan Stenerud kick). Chiefs 28–3.

**Fourth quarter**

- DEN – Floyd Little 26-yard run (Jim Turner kick). Chiefs 28–10.

**Top passers**

- DEN – Steve Ramsey – 17/37, 231 yards, 3 INT
- KC – Len Dawson – 11/19, 294 yards, 3 TD, INT

**Top rushers**

- DEN – Floyd Little – 13 rushes, 63 yards, TD
- KC – Ed Podolak – 14 rushes, 69 yards, TD

**Top receivers**

- DEN – Jerry Simmons – 6 receptions, 153 yards
- KC – Morris Stroud – 3 receptions, 93 yards, TD

==== Week 11: at Detroit Lions ====
Thanksgiving Day games

Week 11: Kansas City Chiefs at Detroit Lions – Game summary

Quarter	1	2	3	4	Total
Chiefs	0	7	7	7	**21**
**Lions**	0	17	12	3	**32**

at Tiger Stadium, Detroit, Michigan

- Date: November 25
- Game time: 12:00 p.m. EST
- Game weather: 29 °F (−2 °C)
- Game attendance: 54,418
- Referee: Jim Tunney
- TV announcers (NBC): Curt Gowdy and Al DeRogatis
- Recap

Game information

**First quarter**

- No scoring plays.

**Second quarter**

- DET – Errol Mann 27-yard field goal. Lions 3–0.
- DET – Steve Owens 1-yard run (Errol Mann kick). Lions 10–0.
- KC – Ed Podolak 2-yard run (Jan Stenerud kick). Lions 10–7.
- DET – Charlie Sanders 5-yard pass from Greg Landry (Errol Mann kick). Lions 17–7.

**Third quarter**

- DET – Earl McCullouch 17-yard pass from Greg Landry (Errol Mann kick). Lions 24–7.
- DET – Punt blocked by Ron Jessie out of bounds in endzone for a Safety. Lions 26–7.
- DET – Errol Mann 28-yard field goal. Lions 29–7.
- KC – Ed Podolak 5-yard run (Jan Stenerud kick). Lions 29–14.

**Fourth quarter**

- DET – Errol Mann 21-yard field goal. Lions 32–14.
- KC – Ed Podolak 6-yard run (Jan Stenerud kick). Lions 32–21.

**Top passers**

- KC – Len Dawson – 13/22, 139 yards, INT
- DET – Greg Landry – 15/22, 225 yards, 2 TD, 2 INT

**Top rushers**

- KC – Wendell Hayes – 10 rushes, 68 yards
- DET – Steve Owens – 22 rushes, 79 yards, TD

**Top receivers**

- KC – Ed Podolak – 5 receptions, 61 yards
- DET – Charlie Sanders – 5 receptions, 90 yards, TD

==== Week 12: at San Francisco 49ers ====
Week 12: Kansas City Chiefs at San Francisco 49ers – Game summary

Quarter	1	2	3	4	Total
**Chiefs**	0	16	7	3	**26**
49ers	3	7	0	7	**17**

at Candlestick Park, San Francisco, California

- Date: December 6
- Game time: 6:00 p.m. PST
- Game weather: 53 °F (12 °C)
- Game attendance: 45,306
- Referee: Pat Haggerty
- TV announcers (ABC): Frank Gifford, Don Meredith and Howard Cosell
- Recap

Game information

**First quarter**

- SF – Bruce Gossett 18-yard field goal. 49ers 3–0.

**Second quarter**

- KC – Jan Stenerud 15-yard field goal. Tied 3–3.
- KC – Otis Taylor 46-yard pass from Len Dawson (Jan Stenerud kick). Chiefs 10–3.
- KC – Jan Stenerud 54-yard field goal. Chiefs 13–3.
- SF – Ted Kwalick 35-yard pass from John Brodie (Bruce Gossett kick). Chiefs 13–10.
- KC – Jan Stenerud 12-yard field goal. Chiefs 16–10.

**Third quarter**

- KC – Otis Taylor 25-yard run (Jan Stenerud kick). Chiefs 23–10.

**Fourth quarter**

- SF – Vic Washington 3-yard run (Bruce Gossett kick). Chiefs 23–17.
- KC – Jan Stenerud 8-yard field goal. Chiefs 26–17.

**Top passers**

- KC – Len Dawson – 16/28, 263 yards, TD
- SF – John Brodie – 20/32, 229 yards, TD, INT

**Top rushers**

- KC – Ed Podolak – 17 rushes, 75 yards
- SF – Vic Washington – 12 rushes, 43 yards, TD

**Top receivers**

- KC – Otis Taylor – 5 receptions, 81 yards, TD
- SF – Gene Washington – 3 receptions, 73 yards

==== Week 13: vs. Oakland Raiders ====
Week 13: Oakland Raiders at Kansas City Chiefs – Game summary

Quarter	1	2	3	4	Total
Raiders	0	7	0	7	**14**
**Chiefs**	7	6	7	3	**23**

at Municipal Stadium, Kansas City, Missouri

- Date: December 12
- Game time: 3:00 p.m. CST
- Game weather: 38 °F (3 °C)
- Game attendance: 51,215
- Referee: Fred Swearingen
- TV announcers (NBC): Curt Gowdy and Al De Rogatis
- Recap

Game information

**First quarter**

- KC – Otis Taylor 29-yard pass from Len Dawson (Jan Stenerud kick). Chiefs 7–0.

**Second quarter**

- KC – Jan Stenerud 33-yard field goal. Chiefs 10–0.
- OAK – Marv Hubbard 1-yard run (George Blanda kick). Chiefs 10–7.
- KC – Jan Stenerud 14-yard field goal. Chiefs 13–7.

**Third quarter**

- No scoring plays.

**Fourth quarter**

- OAK – Marv Hubbard 1-yard run (George Blanda kick). Raiders 14–13.
- KC – Jan Stenerud 10-yard field goal. Chiefs 16–14.

**Top passers**

- OAK – George Blanda – 12/22, 94 yards, 2 INT
- KC – Len Dawson – 18/31, 199 yards, TD, 2 INT

**Top rushers**

- OAK – Marv Hubbard – 21 rushes, 77 yards, 2 TD
- KC – Wendell Hayes – 19 rushes, 77 yards

**Top receivers**

- OAK – Fred Biletnikoff – 6 receptions, 52 yards
- KC – Otis Taylor – 8 receptions, 113 yards, TD

==== Week 14: vs. Buffalo Bills ====
Week 14: Buffalo Bills at Kansas City Chiefs – Game summary

Quarter	1	2	3	4	Total
Bills	3	6	0	0	**9**
**Chiefs**	3	6	10	3	**22**

at Municipal Stadium, Kansas City, Missouri

- Date: December 19
- Game time: 1:00 p.m. CST
- Game weather: 44 °F (7 °C)
- Game attendance: 48,121
- Referee: Bob Frederic
- TV announcers (NBC): Jay Randolph and George Ratterman
- Recap

Game information

**First quarter**

- BUF – John Leypoldt 45-yard field goal. Bills 3–0.
- KC – Jan Stenerud 48-yard field goal. Tied 3–3.

**Second quarter**

- BUF – John Leypoldt 31-yard field goal. Bills 6–3.
- KC – Jan Stenerud 23-yard field goal. Tied 6–6.
- BUF – John Leypoldt 49-yard field goal. Bills 9–6.
- KC – Jan Stenerud 48-yard field goal. Tied 9–9.

**Third quarter**

- KC – Jan Stenerud 45-yard field goal. Chiefs 12–9.
- KC – Bobby Bell 26-yard interception return (Jan Stenerud kick). Chiefs 19–9.

**Fourth quarter**

- KC – Jan Stenerud 34-yard field goal. Chiefs 22–9.

**Top passers**

- BUF – Dennis Shaw – 17/34, 196 yards, 2 INT
- KC – Mike Livingston – 11/25, 136 yards

**Top rushers**

- BUF – O. J. Simpson – 14 rushes, 68 yards
- KC – Warren McVea – 5 rushes, 40 yards

**Top receivers**

- BUF – Marlin Briscoe – 3 receptions, 40 yards
- KC – Otis Taylor – 4 receptions, 55 yards

=== Standings ===
AFC West
	W	L	T	PCT	DIV	CONF	PF	PA	STK
Kansas City Chiefs	10	3	1	.769	4–1–1	8–2–1	302	208	W3
Oakland Raiders	8	4	2	.667	4–1–1	7–3–1	344	278	W1
San Diego Chargers	6	8	0	.429	2–4	4–7	311	341	L1
Denver Broncos	4	9	1	.308	1–5	3–6–1	203	275	L2

Note: Tie games were not officially counted in the standings until 1972.

== Postseason ==
=== Schedule ===
Round	Date	Opponent	Result	Record	Venue	Attendance	Recap
Divisional	December 25	Miami Dolphins	L 24–27 (2OT)	0–1	Municipal Stadium	45,822	Recap

=== Game summaries ===
==== AFC Divisional Playoffs: vs. Miami Dolphins ====
NFL on Christmas Day

AFC Divisional Playoffs: Miami Dolphins at Kansas City Chiefs – Game summary

Quarter	1	2	3	4	OT	2OT	Total
Dolphins	0	10	7	7	0	3	27
Chiefs	10	0	7	7	0	0	24

at Municipal Stadium, Kansas City, Missouri

- Date: December 25
- Game time: 3:00 p.m. CST
- Game weather: 62 °F (17 °C)
- Game attendance: 45,822
- Referee: John McDonough
- TV announcers (NBC): Curt Gowdy and Al De Rogatis
- Recap

Game information

First quarter

- KC – Jan Stenerud 24-yard field goal. Chiefs 3–0.
- KC – Ed Podolak 7-yard pass from Len Dawson (Jan Stenerud kick). Chiefs 10–0.

Second quarter

- MIA – Larry Csonka 1-yard run (Garo Yepremian kick). Chiefs 10–7.
- MIA – Garo Yepremian 14-yard field goal. Tied 10–10.

Third quarter

- KC – Jim Otis 1-yard run (Jan Stenerud kick). Chiefs 17–10.
- MIA – Jim Kiick 1-yard run (Garo Yepremian kick). Tied 17–17.

Fourth quarter

- KC – Ed Podolak 3-yard run (Jan Stenerud kick). Chiefs 24–17.
- MIA – Marv Fleming 5-yard pass from Bob Griese (Garo Yepremian kick). Tied 24–24.

Overtime

- No scoring plays.

Second overtime

- MIA – Garo Yepremian 37-yard field goal. Dolphins 27–24.

Top passers

- MIA – Bob Griese – 20/35, 263 yards, TD, 2 INT
- KC – Len Dawson – 18/26, 246 yards, TD, 2 INT

Top rushers

- MIA – Larry Csonka – 24 rushes, 86 yards, TD
- KC – Wendell Hayes – 22 rushes, 100 yards

Top receivers

- MIA – Paul Warfield – 7 receptions, 140 yards
- KC – Ed Podolak – 8 receptions, 110 yards, TD
