= 1972 Kansas City Chiefs season =

NFL team season

- Owner: Lamar Hunt
- General manager: Jack Steadman
- Head coach: Hank Stram
- Home stadium: Arrowhead Stadium

Results
- Record: 8–6
- Division place: 2nd AFC West
- Playoffs: Did not qualify
- Pro Bowlers: WR Otis Taylor; LB Willie Lanier; LB Bobby Bell; CB Emmitt Thomas; P Jerrel Wilson

The 1972 Kansas City Chiefs season was the franchise's third season in the National Football League, tenth as the Kansas City Chiefs, and thirteenth overall. The Chiefs moved into the new Arrowhead Stadium and ended with an 8–6 record, runner-up in the AFC West, but missed the playoffs.

The last original member of the franchise (1960 Dallas Texans) departed on July 12 when safety Johnny Robinson announced his retirement at training camp. Starting quarterback Len Dawson ended speculation about his retirement and signed a two-year contract on April 4. Franchise owner Lamar Hunt became the first AFL figure to be inducted into the Pro Football Hall of Fame on July 29; Dawson was inducted in 1987 and Robinson in 2019.

After two different construction strikes and a myriad of other delays, Arrowhead Stadium was officially dedicated on August 12, when the Chiefs registered a 24–14 preseason victory over the St. Louis Cardinals. On a very warm Saturday night with an attendance of 78,190, running back Ed Podolak scored the first touchdown in the facility. Regular season ticket prices for this first season at Arrowhead were eight dollars for box seats and $7 for reserved seating.

In the opener on September 17, the Chiefs lost 20–10 to Miami (the first win of their perfect season) in the first regular season game at the new Arrowhead Stadium, in front of a crowd of 79,829. The Chiefs lost their first four games at Arrowhead until beating division rival Oakland in week 8 in front of a standing-room-only crowd of 82,094, the largest “in-house” attendance total for an NFL contest in Arrowhead's history at that time. After a 5–3 start, a three-game losing streak effectively eliminated the club from playoff contention. An 8–6 record was only good enough for a second-place finish in the AFC West, 2½ games behind Oakland. Linebacker Willie Lanier became the first Chiefs player to receive the prestigious NFL Man of the Year Award in the offseason.

In week six, the Chiefs dropped a shocking 21–20 decision at home to the lowly Philadelphia Eagles, who entered the game 0–5 and won only once more (also a one-point victory, over the Houston Oilers, who finished 1–13). It was the only time the Chiefs and Eagles met until 1992, and Kansas City did not visit Philadelphia until 1998.

== Offseason ==
=== NFL draft ===
Round	Pick	Player	Position	School/club team

== Roster ==
1972 Kansas City Chiefs roster
Quarterbacks (QB): 16 Len Dawson; 10 Mike Livingston; Running backs (RB): 1 Mike Adamle; 38 Wendell Hayes; 35 Jim Otis; 14 Ed Podolak; Wide receivers (WR): 41 Bruce Jankowski; 89 Otis Taylor; 26 Robert West; 17 Elmo Wright; Tight ends (TE): 83 Willie Frazier; 88 Morris Stroud	Offensive linemen (OL): 71 Ed Budde G; 60 George Daney G; 79 Larry Gagner G; 73 Dave Hill T; 76 Mo Moorman G; 50 Mike Oriard C; 58 Jack Rudnay C; 70 Sid Smith T; 77 Jim Tyrer T; Defensive linemen (DL): 87 Aaron Brown DE; 86 Buck Buchanan DT; 61 Curley Culp DT; 67 George Seals DT; 81 Marvin Upshaw DE; 99 Wilbur Young DE	Linebackers (LB): 78 Bobby Bell OLB; 55 Keith Best OLB; 63 Willie Lanier MLB; 51 Jim Lynch OLB; 54 Clyde Werner OLB; Defensive backs (DB): 48 Nate Allen CB; 46 Jim Kearney SS; 40 Jim Marsalis CB; 15 Kerry Reardon FS; 20 Mike Sensibaugh FS; 18 Emmitt Thomas CB; Special teams (ST): 3 Jan Stenerud K; 44 Jerrel Wilson P	Practice squad: 9 Dean Carlson QB; 42 Claxton Welch RB; Reserve: 80 Andy Hamilton WR (IR); 31 Jeff Kinney RB (NF-Ill.); 82 Ed Lothamer DT (IR); 22 Larry Marshall S (IR); -- Tim McLane RB (IR); 6 Warren McVea RB (IR); 66 Bob Stein LB (IR); -- Ted Washington LB (IR); Rookies in italics 50 active, 8 reserve, 2 practice squad

== Preseason ==
Week	Date	Opponent	Result	Record	Venue	Attendance	Recap
HOF	July 29	vs. New York Giants	W 23–17	1–0	Fawcett Stadium (Canton, OH)	19,307	Recap
1	August 5	vs. Chicago Bears	W 24–10	2–0	Notre Dame Stadium (Notre Dame, IN)	32,391	Recap
2	August 12	St. Louis Cardinals	W 24–14	3–0	Arrowhead Stadium	78,190	Recap
3	August 21	Baltimore Colts	L 17–23	3–1	Arrowhead Stadium	76,882	Recap
4	August 27	Los Angeles Rams	W 19–13	4–1	Arrowhead Stadium	77,064	Recap
5	September 2	Dallas Cowboys	W 20–10	5–1	Arrowhead Stadium	79,592	Recap
6	September 9	at Green Bay Packers	L 0–20	5–2	Milwaukee County Stadium	47,281	Recap

== Regular season ==
=== Schedule ===
Week	Date	Opponent	Result	Record	Venue	Attendance	Recap
1	September 17	Miami Dolphins	**L** 10–20	0–1	Arrowhead Stadium	79,829	Recap
2	September 25	at New Orleans Saints	**W** 20–17	1–1	Tulane Stadium	70,793	Recap
3	October 1	at **Denver Broncos**	**W** 45–24	2–1	Mile High Stadium	51,656	Recap
4	October 8	at Cleveland Browns	**W** 31–7	3–1	Cleveland Stadium	83,819	Recap
5	October 15	Cincinnati Bengals	**L** 16–23	3–2	Arrowhead Stadium	79,068	Recap
6	October 22	Philadelphia Eagles	**L** 20–21	3–3	Arrowhead Stadium	78,389	Recap
7	October 29	at **San Diego Chargers**	**W** 26–14	4–3	San Diego Stadium	54,533	Recap
8	November 5	**Oakland Raiders**	**W** 27–14	5–3	Arrowhead Stadium	82,094	Recap
9	November 12	at Pittsburgh Steelers	**L** 7–16	5–4	Three Rivers Stadium	50,350	Recap
10	November 19	**San Diego Chargers**	**L** 17–27	5–5	Arrowhead Stadium	79,011	Recap
11	November 26	at **Oakland Raiders**	**L** 3–26	5–6	Oakland–Alameda County Coliseum	54,801	Recap
12	December 3	**Denver Broncos**	**W** 24–21	6–6	Arrowhead Stadium	66,725	Recap
13	December 10	Baltimore Colts	**W** 24–10	7–6	Arrowhead Stadium	44,175	Recap
14	December 17	at Atlanta Falcons	**W** 17–14	8–6	Atlanta Stadium	58,850	Recap
Note: Intra-division opponents are in **bold** text.

=== Game summaries ===
==== Week 1: vs. Miami Dolphins ====
Week 1: Miami Dolphins at Kansas City Chiefs – Game summary

Quarter	1	2	3	4	Total
**Dolphins**	7	10	3	0	**20**
Chiefs	0	0	3	7	**10**

at Arrowhead Stadium, Kansas City, Missouri

- Date: September 17
- Game time: 3:00 p.m. CDT
- Game weather: 81 °F (27.2 °C), relative humidity 65%, wind 15 mph
- Game attendance: 79,829
- Referee: Jim Tunney
- TV announcers (NBC): Curt Gowdy and Al DeRogatis
- Box score

Game information

**First quarter**

- MIA – Marlin Briscoe 14-yard pass from Bob Griese (Garo Yepremian kick). Dolphins 7–0.

**Second quarter**

- MIA – Garo Yepremian 47-yard field goal. Dolphins 10–0.
- MIA – Larry Csonka 2-yard run (Garo Yepremian kick). Dolphins 17–0.

**Third quarter**

- MIA – Garo Yepremian 15-yard field goal. Dolphins 20–0.
- KC – Jan Stenerud 40-yard field goal. Dolphins 20–3.

**Fourth quarter**

- KC – Willie Frazier 4-yard pass from Len Dawson (Jan Stenerud kick). Dolphins 20–10.

Top passers

- MIA – Bob Griese – 8/15, 111 yards, TD, INT
- KC – Len Dawson – 22/33, 237 yards, TD, 2 INT

Top rushers

- MIA – Larry Csonka – 21 rushes, 118 yards, TD
- KC – Ed Podolak – 13 rushes, 81 yards

Top receivers

- MIA – Paul Warfield – 2 receptions, 49 yards
- KC – Otis Taylor – 4 receptions, 69 yards

==== Week 2: at New Orleans Saints ====
Week 2: Kansas City Chiefs at New Orleans Saints – Game summary

Quarter	1	2	3	4	Total
**Chiefs**	0	10	0	10	**20**
Saints	0	10	7	0	**17**

at Tulane Stadium, New Orleans, Louisiana

- Date: September 25
- Game time: 8:00 p.m. CDT
- Game weather: 79 °F (26.1 °C), relative humidity 81%, wind 12 mph
- Game attendance: 70,793
- Referee: Tommy Bell
- TV announcers (ABC): Frank Gifford, Don Meredith and Howard Cosell
- Box score

Game information

**First quarter**

- No scoring plays.

**Second quarter**

- NO – Charlie Durkee 31-yard field goal. Saints 3–0.
- KC – Jan Stenerud 12-yard field goal. Tied 3–3.
- NO – Doug Wyatt 35-yard fumble return (Charlie Durkee kick). Saints 10–3.
- KC – Willie Frazier 4-yard pass from Len Dawson (Jan Stenerud kick). Tied 10–10.

**Third quarter**

- NO – Dave Parks 8-yard pass from Archie Manning (Charlie Durkee kick). Saints 17–10.

**Fourth quarter**

- KC – Otis Taylor 21-yard pass from Len Dawson (Jan Stenerud kick). Tied 17–17.
- KC – Jan Stenerud 22-yard field goal. Chiefs 20–17.

Top passers

- KC – Len Dawson – 21/29, 204 yards, 2 TD, INT
- NO – Archie Manning – 10/24, 115 yards, TD

Top rushers

- KC – Ed Podolak – 18 rushes, 69 yards
- NO – Bob Gresham – 12 rushes, 42 yards

Top receivers

- KC – Otis Taylor – 7 receptions, 75 yards, TD
- NO – Dave Parks – 3 receptions, 46 yards, TD

==== Week 3: at Denver Broncos ====
Week 3: Kansas City Chiefs at Denver Broncos – Game summary

Quarter	1	2	3	4	Total
**Chiefs**	3	7	14	21	**45**
Broncos	7	3	7	7	**24**

at Mile High Stadium, Denver, Colorado

- Date: October 1
- Game time: 2:00 p.m. MDT
- Game weather: 62 °F (16.7 °C), relative humidity 24%, wind 7 mph
- Game attendance: 51,656
- Referee: Fred Silva
- TV announcers (NBC): Bill Enis and Willie Davis
- Box score

Game information

**First quarter**

- DEN – Floyd Little 35-yard pass from Steve Ramsey (Jim Turner kick). Broncos 7–0.
- KC – Jan Stenerud 11-yard field goal. Broncos 7–3.

**Second quarter**

- KC – Jeff Kinney 1-yard run (Jan Stenerud kick). Chiefs 10–7.
- DEN – Jim Turner 16-yard field goal. Tied 10–10.

**Third quarter**

- KC – Willie Frazier 4-yard pass from Mike Livingston (Jan Stenerud kick). Chiefs 17–10.
- DEN – Otis Taylor 15-yard run (Jim Turner kick). Tied 17–17.
- KC – Dennis Homan 9-yard pass from Mike Livingston (Jan Stenerud kick). Chiefs 24–17.

**Fourth quarter**

- KC – Otis Taylor 29-yard pass from Mike Livingston (Jan Stenerud kick). Chiefs 31–17.
- KC – Jim Kearney 43-yard interception return (Jan Stenerud kick). Chiefs 38–17.
- DEN – Floyd Little 1-yard run (Jim Turner kick). Chiefs 38–24.
- KC – Jim Kearney 32-yard interception return (Jan Stenerud kick). Chiefs 45–24.

Top passers

- KC – Len Dawson – 7/16, 105 yards
- DEN – Steve Ramsey – 13/35, 247 yards, TD, 3 INT

Top rushers

- KC – Mike Livingston – 2 rushes, 51 yards
- DEN – Floyd Little – 21 rushes, 96 yards, TD

Top receivers

- KC – Otis Taylor – 5 receptions, 68 yards, TD
- DEN – Jim Krieg – 3 receptions, 81 yards

==== Week 4: at Cleveland Browns ====
Week 4: Kansas City Chiefs at Cleveland Browns – Game summary

Quarter	1	2	3	4	Total
**Chiefs**	7	14	7	3	**31**
Browns	0	7	0	0	**7**

at Cleveland Municipal Stadium, Cleveland, Ohio

- Date: October 8
- Game time: 1:00 p.m. EDT
- Game weather: 50 °F (10.0 °C), relative humidity 74%, wind 14 mph
- Game attendance: 83,819
- Referee: Jack Reader
- TV announcers (NBC): Charlie Jones and Al De Rogatis
- Box score

Game information

**First quarter**

- KC – Willie Frazier 3-yard pass from Mike Livingston (Jan Stenerud kick). Chiefs 7–0.

**Second quarter**

- KC – Morris Stroud 39-yard pass from Mike Livingston (Jan Stenerud kick). Chiefs 14–0.
- CLE – Fair Hooker 16-yard pass from Mike Phipps (Don Cockroft kick). Chiefs 14–7.
- KC – Otis Taylor 34-yard pass from Mike Livingston (Jan Stenerud kick). Chiefs 21–7.

**Third quarter**

- KC – Mike Adamle 1-yard run (Jan Stenerud kick). Chiefs 28–7.

**Fourth quarter**

- KC – Jan Stenerud 34-yard field goal. Chiefs 31–7.

Top passers

- KC – Mike Livingston – 8/18, 81 yards, 3 TD, INT
- CLE – Mike Phipps – 12/27, 121 yards, TD, 4 INT

Top rushers

- KC – Mike Adamle – 20 rushes, 88 yards, TD
- CLE – Ken Brown – 7 rushes, 48 yards

Top receivers

- KC – Otis Taylor – 2 receptions, 38 yards, TD
- CLE – Fair Hooker – 3 receptions, 36 yards, TD

==== Week 5: vs. Cincinnati Bengals ====
Week 5: Cincinnati Bengals at Kansas City Chiefs – Game summary

Quarter	1	2	3	4	Total
**Bengals**	3	0	7	13	**23**
Chiefs	0	3	10	3	**16**

at Arrowhead Stadium, Kansas City, Missouri

- Date: October 15
- Game time: 3:00 p.m. CDT
- Game weather: 47 °F (8.3 °C), relative humidity 56%, wind 11 mph
- Game attendance: 79,068
- Referee: Fred Swearingen
- TV announcers (NBC): Charlie Jones and Al De Rogatis
- Box score

Game information

**First quarter**

- CIN – Horst Mühlmann 46-yard field goal. Bengals 3–0.

**Second quarter**

- KC – Jan Stenerud 39-yard field goal. Tied 3–3.

**Third quarter**

- KC – Otis Taylor 14-yard pass from Len Dawson (Jan Stenerud kick). Chiefs 10–3.
- CIN – Essex Johnson 65-yard pass from Ken Anderson (Horst Mühlmann kick). Tied 10–10.
- KC – Jan Stenerud 32-yard field goal. Chiefs 13–10.

**Fourth quarter**

- CIN – Speedy Thomas 7-yard pass from Ken Anderson (Horst Mühlmann kick). Bengals 17–13.
- CIN – Horst Mühlmann 12-yard field goal. Bengals 20–13.
- CIN – Horst Mühlmann 16-yard field goal. Bengals 23–13.
- KC – Jan Stenerud 43-yard field goal. Bengals 23–16.

Top passers

- CIN – Ken Anderson – 14/25, 182 yards, 2 TD
- KC – Len Dawson – 21/38, 230 yards, TD, 2 INT

Top rushers

- CIN – Essex Johnson – 11 rushes, 36 yards
- KC – Mike Adamle – 17 rushes, 91 yards

Top receivers

- CIN – Chip Myers – 3 receptions, 69 yards
- KC – Otis Taylor – 10 receptions, 149 yards, TD

==== Week 6: vs. Philadelphia Eagles ====
Week 6: Philadelphia Eagles at Kansas City Chiefs – Game summary

Quarter	1	2	3	4	Total
**Eagles**	14	7	0	0	**21**
Chiefs	0	6	7	7	**20**

at Arrowhead Stadium, Kansas City, Missouri

- Date: October 22
- Game time: 1:00 p.m. CDT
- Game weather: 55 °F (12.8 °C), relative humidity 92%, wind 13 mph
- Game attendance: 78,389
- Referee: Bob Frederic
- TV announcers (CBS): Don Criqui, Irv Cross and Jim Thacker
- Box score

Game information

**First quarter**

- PHI – Ben Hawkins 67-yard pass from Pete Liske (Tom Dempsey kick). Eagles 7–0.
- PHI – Harold Jackson 36-yard pass from Pete Liske (Tom Dempsey kick). Eagles 14–0.

**Second quarter**

- PHI – Harold Jackson 41-yard pass from Pete Liske (Tom Dempsey kick). Eagles 21–0.
- KC – Jan Stenerud 31-yard field goal. Eagles 21–3.
- KC – Jan Stenerud 37-yard field goal. Eagles 21–6.

**Third quarter**

- KC – Ed Podolak 11-yard run (Jan Stenerud kick). Eagles 21–13.

**Fourth quarter**

- KC – Willie Frazier 20-yard pass from Len Dawson (Jan Stenerud kick). Eagles 21–20.

Top passers

- PHI – Pete Liske – 8/12, 209 yards, 3 TD, 2 INT
- KC – Len Dawson – 17/29, 168 yards, TD, INT

Top rushers

- PHI – Larry Watkins – 18 rushes, 87 yards
- KC – Wendell Hayes – 11 rushes, 55 yards

Top receivers

- PHI – Harold Jackson – 3 receptions, 93 yards, 2 TD
- KC – Ed Podolak – 7 receptions, 60 yards

==== Week 7: at San Diego Chargers ====
Week 7: Kansas City Chiefs at San Diego Chargers – Game summary

Quarter	1	2	3	4	Total
**Chiefs**	0	3	10	13	**26**
Chargers	0	7	0	7	**14**

at San Diego Stadium, San Diego, California

- Date: October 29
- Game time: 1:00 p.m. PST
- Game weather: 62 °F (16.7 °C), relative humidity 75%, wind 8 mph
- Game attendance: 54,533
- Referee: Norm Schachter
- TV announcers (NBC): Charlie Jones and George Ratterman
- Box score

Game information

**First quarter**

- No scoring plays.

**Second quarter**

- KC – Jan Stenerud 33-yard field goal. Chiefs 3–0.
- SD – Mike Garrett 27-yard pass from John Hadl (Dennis Partee kick). Chargers 7–3.

**Third quarter**

- KC – Jan Stenerud 50-yard field goal. Chargers 7–6.
- KC – Ed Podolak 6-yard run (Jan Stenerud kick). Chiefs 13–7.

**Fourth quarter**

- KC – Jan Stenerud 15-yard field goal. Chiefs 16–7.
- SD – Mike Garrett 3-yard run (Dennis Partee kick). Chiefs 16–14.
- KC – Robert West 8-yard fumble return (Jan Stenerud kick). Chiefs 23–14.
- KC – Jan Stenerud 37-yard field goal. Chiefs 26–14.

Top passers

- KC – Len Dawson – 14/27, 154 yards, 2 INT
- SD – John Hadl – 18/36, 231 yards, TD, 3 INT

Top rushers

- KC – Ed Podolak – 18 rushes, 71 yards, TD
- SD – Cid Edwards – 12 rushes, 55 yards

Top receivers

- KC – Otis Taylor – 5 receptions, 86 yards
- SD – Cid Edwards – 7 receptions, 93 yards

==== Week 8: vs. Oakland Raiders ====
Week 8: Oakland Raiders at Kansas City Chiefs – Game summary

Quarter	1	2	3	4	Total
Raiders	0	0	7	7	**14**
**Chiefs**	0	17	3	7	**27**

at Arrowhead Stadium, Kansas City, Missouri

- Date: November 5
- Game time: 3:00 p.m. CST
- Game weather: 53 °F (11.7 °C), relative humidity 60%, wind 12 mph
- Game attendance: 82,094
- Referee: Pat Haggerty
- TV announcers (NBC): Curt Gowdy and Al De Rogatis
- Box score

Game information

**First quarter**

- No scoring plays.

**Second quarter**

- KC – Wendell Hayes 29-yard pass from Len Dawson (Jan Stenerud kick). Chiefs 7–0.
- KC – Robert West 42-yard pass from Len Dawson (Jan Stenerud kick). Chiefs 14–0.
- KC – Jan Stenerud 31-yard field goal. Chiefs 17–0.

**Third quarter**

- KC – Jan Stenerud 40-yard field goal. Chiefs 20–0.
- OAK – Marv Hubbard 4-yard run (George Blanda kick). Chiefs 20–7.

**Fourth quarter**

- KC – Ed Podolak 27-yard pass from Len Dawson (Jan Stenerud kick). Chiefs 27–7.
- OAK – Raymond Chester 13-yard pass from Ken Stabler (George Blanda kick). Chiefs 27–14.

Top passers

- OAK – Ken Stabler – 14/23, 167 yards, TD
- KC – Len Dawson – 10/18, 181 yards, 3 TD

Top rushers

- OAK – Charlie Smith – 8 rushes, 30 yards
- KC – Ed Podolak – 27 rushes, 115 yards

Top receivers

- OAK – Fred Biletnikoff – 10 receptions, 114 yards
- KC – Otis Taylor – 3 receptions, 51 yards

==== Week 9: at Pittsburgh Steelers ====
Week 9: Kansas City Chiefs at Pittsburgh Steelers – Game summary

Quarter	1	2	3	4	Total
Chiefs	0	7	0	0	**7**
**Steelers**	0	0	3	13	**16**

at Three Rivers Stadium, Pittsburgh, Pennsylvania

- Date: November 12
- Game time: 1:00 p.m. EST
- Game weather: 41 °F (5.0 °C), relative humidity 75%, wind 9 mph
- Game attendance: 50,350
- Referee: Jim Tunney
- TV announcers (NBC): Jim Simpson and Kyle Rote
- Box score

Game information

**First quarter**

- No scoring plays.

**Second quarter**

- KC – Jim Kearney 65-yard interception return (Jan Stenerud kick). Chiefs 7–0.

**Third quarter**

- PIT – Roy Gerela 25-yard field goal. Chiefs 7–3.

**Fourth quarter**

- PIT – Roy Gerela 10-yard field goal. Chiefs 7–6.
- PIT – Roy Gerela 49-yard field goal. Steelers 9–7.
- PIT – Franco Harris 7-yard run (Roy Gerela kick). Steelers 16–7.

Top passers

- KC – Len Dawson – 17/36, 161 yards, INT
- PIT – Terry Bradshaw – 8/20, 92 yards, 3 INT

Top rushers

- KC – Jim Otis – 8 rushes, 22 yards
- PIT – Franco Harris – 17 rushes, 134 yards, TD

Top receivers

- KC – Otis Taylor – 3 receptions, 45 yards
- PIT – Ronnie Shanklin – 1 reception, 36 yards

==== Week 10: vs. San Diego Chargers ====
Week 10: San Diego Chargers at Kansas City Chiefs – Game summary

Quarter	1	2	3	4	Total
**Chargers**	7	17	3	0	**27**
Chiefs	7	0	3	7	**17**

at Arrowhead Stadium, Kansas City, Missouri

- Date: November 19
- Game time: 1:00 p.m. CST
- Game weather: 32 °F (0.0 °C), relative humidity 81%, wind 11 mph, wind chill 23
- Game attendance: 79,011
- Referee: Jack Reader
- TV announcers (NBC): Jim Simpson and Kyle Rote
- Box score

Game information

**First quarter**

- SD – Mike Garrett 3-yard run (Dennis Partee kick). Chargers 7–0.
- KC – Wendell Hayes 4-yard pass from Len Dawson (Jan Stenerud kick). Tied 7–7.

**Second quarter**

- SD – Dennis Partee 46-yard field goal. Chargers 10–7.
- SD – John Hadl 1-yard run (Dennis Partee kick). Chargers 17–7.
- SD – Gary Garrison 20-yard pass from John Hadl (Dennis Partee kick). Chargers 24–7.

**Third quarter**

- SD – Dennis Partee 24-yard field goal. Chargers 27–7.
- KC – Jan Stenerud 28-yard field goal. Chargers 27–10.

**Fourth quarter**

- KC – Robert West 36-yard pass from Mike Livingston (Jan Stenerud kick). Chargers 27–17.

Top passers

- SD – John Hadl – 17/28, 216 yards, TD
- KC – Mike Livingston – 19/30, 231 yards, TD, 3 INT

Top rushers

- SD – Cid Edwards – 12 rushes, 62 yards
- KC – Mike Adamle – 9 rushes, 34 yards

Top receivers

- SD – Cid Edwards – 6 receptions, 82 yards
- KC – Otis Taylor – 3 receptions, 61 yards

==== Week 11: at Oakland Raiders ====
Week 11: Kansas City Chiefs at Oakland Raiders – Game summary

Quarter	1	2	3	4	Total
Chiefs	0	3	0	0	**3**
**Raiders**	10	13	0	3	**26**

at Oakland–Alameda County Coliseum, Oakland, California

- Date: November 26
- Game time: 1:00 p.m. PST
- Game weather: 50 °F (10.0 °C), relative humidity 88%, wind 8 mph
- Game attendance: 54,801
- Referee: Ben Dreith
- TV announcers (NBC): Curt Gowdy and Al De Rogatis
- Box score

Game information

**First quarter**

- OAK – Charlie Smith 2-yard run (George Blanda kick). Raiders 7–0.
- OAK – George Blanda 27-yard field goal. Raiders 10–0.

**Second quarter**

- KC – Jan Stenerud 40-yard field goal. Raiders 10–3.
- OAK – Fred Biletnikoff 14-yard pass Daryle Lamonica (kick failed). Raiders 16–3.
- OAK – Raymond Chester 19-yard pass from Daryle Lamonica (George Blanda kick). Raiders 23–3.

**Third quarter**

- No scoring plays.

**Fourth quarter**

- OAK – George Blanda 25-yard field goal. Raiders 26–3.

Top passers

- KC – Mike Livingston – 9/21, 66 yards, 3 INT
- OAK – Daryle Lamonica – 14/21, 174 yards, 2 TD, INT

Top rushers

- KC – Mike Adamle – 9 rushes, 36 yards
- OAK – Marv Hubbard – 13 rushes, 96 yards

Top receivers

- KC – Wendell Hayes – 3 receptions, 26 yards
- OAK – Fred Biletnikoff – 3 receptions, 33 yards, TD

==== Week 12: vs. Denver Broncos ====
Week 12: Denver Broncos at Kansas City Chiefs – Game summary

Quarter	1	2	3	4	Total
Broncos	7	7	0	7	**21**
**Chiefs**	0	10	14	0	**24**

at Arrowhead Stadium, Kansas City, Missouri

- Date: December 3
- Game time: 1:00 p.m. CST
- Game weather: 30 °F (−1.1 °C), relative humidity 68%, wind 19 mph, wind chill 18
- Game attendance: 66,725
- Referee: John McDonough
- TV announcers (NBC): Ross Porter and Willie Davis
- Box score

Game information

**First quarter**

- DEN – Floyd Little 2-yard run (Jim Turner kick). Broncos 7–0.

**Second quarter**

- KC – Jim Kearney 29-yard interception return (Jan Stenerud kick). Tied 7–7.
- KC – Jan Stenerud 41-yard field goal. Chiefs 10–7.
- DEN – Haven Moses 1-yard pass from Charley Johnson (Jim Turner kick). Broncos 14–10.

**Third quarter**

- KC – Ed Podolak 1-yard run (Jan Stenerud kick). Chiefs 17–14.
- KC – Bobby Bell 61-yard interception return (Jan Stenerud kick). Chiefs 24–14.

**Fourth quarter**

- DEN – Fran Lynch 8-yard run (Jim Turner kick). Chiefs 24–21.

Top passers

- DEN – Charley Johnson – 18/35, 211 yards, TD, 2 INT
- KC – Mike Livingston – 7/20, 77 yards, INT

Top rushers

- DEN – Floyd Little – 22 rushes, 86 yards, TD
- KC – Ed Podolak – 14 rushes, 54 yards, TD

Top receivers

- DEN – Haven Moses – 4 receptions, 57 yards, TD
- KC – Ed Podolak – 3 receptions, 34 yards

==== Week 13: vs. Baltimore Colts ====
Week 13: Baltimore Colts at Kansas City Chiefs – Game summary

Quarter	1	2	3	4	Total
Colts	0	10	0	0	**10**
**Chiefs**	3	7	7	7	**24**

at Arrowhead Stadium, Kansas City, Missouri

- Date: December 10
- Game time: 3:00 p.m. CST
- Game weather: 8 °F (−13.3 °C), relative humidity 56%, wind 11 mph, wind chill -8
- Game attendance: 44,175
- Referee: Fred Wyant
- TV announcers (NBC): Bill Enis and Paul Maguire
- Box score

Game information

**First quarter**

- KC – Jan Stenerud 31-yard field goal. Chiefs 3–0.

**Second quarter**

- BAL – Jim O'Brien 22-yard field goal. Tied 3–3.
- BAL – Tom Mitchell 5-yard pass from Marty Domres (Jim O'Brien kick). Colts 10–3.
- KC – Wendell Hayes 13-yard pass from Len Dawson (Jan Stenerud kick). Tied 10–10.

**Third quarter**

- KC – Otis Taylor 25-yard pass from Len Dawson (Jan Stenerud kick). Chiefs 17–10.

**Fourth quarter**

- KC – Ed Podolak 5-yard run (Jan Stenerud kick). Chiefs 24–10.

Top passers

- BAL – Marty Domres – 11/24, 148 yards, TD, 2 INT
- KC – Len Dawson – 15/21, 137 yards, 2 TD

Top rushers

- BAL – Don McCauley – 11 rushes, 43 yards
- KC – Wendell Hayes – 19 rushes, 104 yards

Top receivers

- BAL – Jim O'Brien – 2 receptions, 59 yards
- KC – Wendell Hayes – 5 receptions, 55 yards, TD

==== Week 14: at Atlanta Falcons ====
Week 14: Kansas City Chiefs at Atlanta Falcons – Game summary

Quarter	1	2	3	4	Total
**Chiefs**	0	3	7	7	**17**
Falcons	0	7	0	7	**14**

at Atlanta Stadium, Atlanta, Georgia

- Date: December 17
- Game time: 1:00 p.m. EST
- Game weather: 27 °F (−2.8 °C), relative humidity 35%, wind 15 mph, wind chill 15
- Game attendance: 58,850
- Referee: Norm Schachter
- TV announcers (NBC): Curt Gowdy and Al De Rogatis
- Box score

Game information

**First quarter**

- No scoring plays.

**Second quarter**

- KC – Jan Stenerud 28-yard field goal. Chiefs 3–0.
- ATL – Art Malone 1-yard run (Bill Bell kick). Falcons 7–3.

**Third quarter**

- KC – Otis Taylor 25-yard pass from Len Dawson (Jan Stenerud kick). Chiefs 10–7.

**Fourth quarter**

- ATL – Ken Burrow 17-yard pass from Bob Berry (Bill Bell kick). Falcons 14–10.
- KC – Ed Podolak 7-yard pass from Len Dawson (Jan Stenerud kick). Chiefs 17–14.

Top passers

- KC – Len Dawson – 18/26, 139 yards, 2 TD, INT
- ATL – Bob Berry – 11/25, 177 yards, TD, 2 INT

Top rushers

- KC – Wendell Hayes – 17 rushes, 69 yards
- ATL – Dave Hampton – 19 rushes, 65 yards

Top receivers

- KC – Otis Taylor – 8 receptions, 69 yards, TD
- ATL – Jim Mitchell – 2 receptions, 57 yards

== Standings ==
AFC West
	W	L	T	PCT	DIV	CONF	PF	PA	STK
Oakland Raiders	10	3	1	.750	3–2–1	7–3–1	365	248	W6
Kansas City Chiefs	8	6	0	.571	4–2	6–5	287	254	W3
Denver Broncos	5	9	0	.357	2–4	4–6	325	350	W2
San Diego Chargers	4	9	1	.321	2–3–1	4–6–1	264	344	L3
