= 1973 Kansas City Chiefs season =

NFL team season

- Owner: Lamar Hunt
- General manager: Jack Steadman
- Head coach: Hank Stram
- Home stadium: Arrowhead Stadium

Results
- Record: 7–5–2
- Division place: 2nd AFC West
- Playoffs: Did not qualify
- Pro Bowlers: C Jack Rudnay; LB Willie Lanier

The 1973 Kansas City Chiefs season was the franchise's 4th season in the National Football League, the 11th as the Kansas City Chiefs, and the 14th overall. they finished with a 7–5–2 record and missed the playoffs for the second straight year. This was their last winning season until 1981.

The defense kept the club in contention thanks to a nucleus that still included the bulk of the squad's Super Bowl IV starters. Quarterback Mike Livingston started in a 23–13 Opening Day loss against the Los Angeles Rams on September 16, but Len Dawson returned to rally the club for three consecutive wins to get the club off to a 3–1 start for a third consecutive year. The aging Dawson made his final start of the year in a 23–14 loss at Buffalo on October 29 and was replaced for the remainder of the year by Livingston, beginning a string of three straight seasons in which both players split time at the position.

Livingston led the club to another three straight wins, putting the team in first place in mid-November with a 6–3–1 record. A 1–2–1 ledger over the season's final month ended the club's post-season aspirations as the team finished the year in a second-place tie with Denver at 7–5–2. Dawson became the second Chiefs player in as many years to win the NFL Man of the Year Award. Following Super Bowl VIII, The AFC-NFC Pro Bowl was held at Arrowhead Stadium on January 20 with the AFC claiming a 15–13 win thanks to five field goals from Miami placekicker Garo Yepremian.

To date, the 1973 Chiefs along with the Denver Broncos, Cleveland Browns, and Green Bay Packers are the last teams to record 2 ties in a single season. Overtime for regular season games was introduced the following year, and the occurrence of tie games decreased.

== Offseason ==
=== NFL draft ===
Round	Pick	Player	Position	School/Club team

== Roster ==
1973 Kansas City Chiefs roster
Quarterbacks (QB): 11 Pete Beathard; 9 Dean Carlson; 16 Len Dawson; 10 Mike Livingston; Running backs (RB): 24 Willie Ellison; 38 Wendell Hayes; 31 Jeff Kinney; 14 Ed Podolak; Wide receivers (WR): 80 Andy Hamilton; 27 Dan Kratzer; 85 Dave Smith; 89 Otis Taylor; 26 Robert West; 17 Elmo Wright; Tight ends (TE): 82 Gary Butler; 88 Morris Stroud	Offensive linemen (OL): 71 Ed Budde G; 60 George Daney G; 73 Dave Hill T; 76 Mo Moorman G; 50 Mike Oriard C; 75 Francis Peay T; 58 Jack Rudnay C; 77 Jim Tyrer T; 72 Wayne Walton G; Defensive linemen (DL): 86 Buck Buchanan DT; 61 Curley Culp DT; 74 Pat Holmes DE; 67 George Seals DT; 81 Marvin Upshaw DE; 99 Wilbur Young DE	Linebackers (LB): 78 Bobby Bell OLB; 63 Willie Lanier MLB; 51 Jim Lynch OLB; 57 Al Palewicz OLB; 54 Clyde Werner OLB; Defensive backs (DB): 48 Nate Allen CB; 46 Jim Kearney SS; 32 Doug Jones SS; 40 Jim Marsalis CB; 22 Larry Marshall SS; 15 Kerry Reardon FS; 20 Mike Sensibaugh FS; 18 Emmitt Thomas CB; Special teams (ST): 3 Jan Stenerud K; 44 Jerrel Wilson P	Reserve: -- Jim Butler RB (IR); -- Ernie Calloway DE/DT (PUP); 23 Leroy Keyes RB (IR); 87 John Lohmeyer DE (IR); -- Bill Story G (IR); Rookies in italics 51 active, 5 reserve, 0 practice squad

== Preseason ==
Week	Date	Opponent	Result	Record	Venue	Attendance	Recap
1	August 4	New Orleans Saints	W 12–6	1–0	Arrowhead Stadium	67,216	Recap
2	August 13	Detroit Lions	L 16–17	1–1	Arrowhead Stadium	67,624	Recap
3	August 18	Minnesota Vikings	L 10–13	1–2	Arrowhead Stadium	72,676	Recap
4	August 26	Green Bay Packers	L 16–21	1–3	Arrowhead Stadium	75,231	Recap
5	September 1	at Dallas Cowboys	L 16–27	1–4	Texas Stadium	57,468	Recap
6	September 7	at St. Louis Cardinals	W 16–7	2–4	Busch Memorial Stadium	49,486	Recap

== Regular season ==
=== Schedule ===
Week	Date	Opponent	Result	Record	Venue	Attendance	Recap
1	September 16	Los Angeles Rams	**L** 13–23	0–1	Arrowhead Stadium	62,315	Recap
2	September 23	at New England Patriots	**W** 10–7	1–1	Schaefer Stadium	57,918	Recap
3	September 30	**Oakland Raiders**	**W** 16–3	2–1	Arrowhead Stadium	72,631	Recap
4	October 7	**Denver Broncos**	**W** 16–14	3–1	Arrowhead Stadium	71,414	Recap
5	October 14	at Green Bay Packers	**T** 10–10	3–1–1	Milwaukee County Stadium	46,583	Recap
6	October 21	at Cincinnati Bengals	**L** 6–14	3–2–1	Riverfront Stadium	56,397	Recap
7	October 29	at Buffalo Bills	**L** 14–23	3–3–1	Rich Stadium	76,071	Recap
8	November 4	at **San Diego Chargers**	**W** 19–0	4–3–1	San Diego Stadium	50,234	Recap
9	November 12	Chicago Bears	**W** 19–7	5–3–1	Arrowhead Stadium	70,664	Recap
10	November 18	Houston Oilers	**W** 38–14	6–3–1	Arrowhead Stadium	68,444	Recap
11	November 25	at **Denver Broncos**	**L** 10–14	6–4–1	Mile High Stadium	51,331	Recap
12	December 2	Cleveland Browns	**T** 20–20	6–4–2	Arrowhead Stadium	70,296	Recap
13	December 8	at **Oakland Raiders**	**L** 7–37	6–5–2	Oakland–Alameda County Coliseum	53,945	Recap
14	December 16	**San Diego Chargers**	**W** 33–6	7–5–2	Arrowhead Stadium	43,755	Recap
Note: Intra-division opponents are in **bold** text.

=== Game summaries ===
==== Week 1 vs. Los Angeles Rams ====
Week 1: Los Angeles Rams at Kansas City Chiefs – Game summary

Quarter	1	2	3	4	Total
**Rams**	6	14	3	0	**23**
Chiefs	0	0	0	13	**13**

at Arrowhead Stadium, Kansas City, Missouri

- Date: September 16
- Game time: 3:00 p.m. CDT
- Game weather: 59 °F (15 °C)
- Game attendance: 62,315
- Referee: Chuck Heberling
- TV announcers (CBS): Ray Scott, Tom Brookshier, and Gil Stratton
- Box Score

Game information

**First quarter**

- LA – Pat Curran 2-yard pass from John Hadl (kick failed). Rams 6–0.

**Second quarter**

- LA – Lawrence McCutcheon 31-yard pass from John Hadl (David Ray kick). Rams 13–0.
- LA – Steve Preece 11-yard run (David Ray kick). Rams 20–0.

**Third quarter**

- LA – David Ray 27-yard field goal. Rams 23–0.

**Fourth quarter**

- KC – Elmo Wright 16-yard pass from Pete Beathard (Jan Stenerud kick). Rams 23–7.
- KC – Gary Butler 6-yard pass from Pete Beathard (kick failed). Rams 23–14.

Top passers

- LA – John Hadl – 8/10, 99 yards, 2 TD
- KC – Pete Beathard – 15/20, 198 yards, 2 TD

Top rushers

- LA – Jim Bertelsen – 28 rushes, 143 yards
- KC – Wendell Hayes – 3 rushes, 12 yards

Top receivers

- LA – Lawrence McCutcheon – 3 receptions, 53 yards, TD
- KC – Otis Taylor – 4 receptions, 83 yards

==== Week 2: at New England Patriots ====
Week 2: Kansas City Chiefs at New England Patriots – Game summary

Quarter	1	2	3	4	Total
**Chiefs**	0	10	0	0	**10**
Patriots	0	0	0	7	**7**

at Schaefer Stadium, Foxborough, Massachusetts

- Date: September 23
- Game time: 1:00 p.m. EDT
- Game weather: 68 °F (20 °C)
- Game attendance: 57,918
- Referee: Bob Frederic
- TV announcers (NBC): Jay Randolph and Paul Maguire
- Box Score

Game information

**First quarter**

- No scoring plays.

**Second quarter**

- KC – Willie Ellison 1-yard run (Jan Stenerud kick). Chiefs 7–0.
- KC – Jan Stenerud 33-yard field goal. Chiefs 10–0.

**Third quarter**

- No scoring plays.

**Fourth quarter**

- NE – Sam Cunningham 1-yard run (Bill Bell kick). Chiefs 10–7.

Top passers

- KC – Len Dawson – 11/14, 180 yards
- NE – Jim Plunkett – 16/29, 203 yards, INT

Top rushers

- KC – Willie Ellison – 20 rushes, 90 yards, TD
- NE – Sam Cunningham – 9 rushes, 22 yards, TD

Top receivers

- KC – Otis Taylor – 5 receptions, 115 yards
- NE – Reggie Rucker – 5 receptions, 97 yards

==== Week 3: vs. Oakland Raiders ====
Week 3: Oakland Raiders at Kansas City Chiefs – Game summary

Quarter	1	2	3	4	Total
Raiders	0	3	0	0	**3**
**Chiefs**	0	6	3	7	**16**

at Arrowhead Stadium, Kansas City, Missouri

- Date: September 30
- Game time: 3:00 p.m. CDT
- Game weather: 59 °F (15 °C)
- Game attendance: 72,631
- Referee: Dick Jorgensen
- TV announcers (NBC): Curt Gowdy and Al DeRogatis
- Box Score

Game information

**First quarter**

- No scoring plays.

**Second quarter**

- OAK – George Blanda 21-yard field goal. Raiders 3–0.
- KC – Jan Stenerud 47-yard field goal. Tie 3–3.
- KC – Jan Stenerud 41-yard field goal. Chiefs 6–3.

**Third quarter**

- KC – Jan Stenerud 29-yard field goal. Chiefs 9–3.

**Fourth quarter**

- KC – Willie Lanier 17-yard interception return (Jan Stenerud kick). Chiefs 16–3.

Top passers

- OAK – Daryle Lamonica – 4/12, 53 yards, INT
- KC – Len Dawson – 10/13, 82 yards

Top rushers

- OAK – Charlie Smith – 11 rushes, 30 yards
- KC – Wendell Hayes – 21 rushes, 83 yards

Top receivers

- OAK – Cliff Branch – 2 receptions, 29 yards
- KC – Wendell Hayes – 3 receptions, 23 yards

==== Week 4: vs. Denver Broncos ====
Week 4: Denver Broncos at Kansas City Chiefs – Game summary

Quarter	1	2	3	4	Total
Broncos	0	7	0	7	**14**
**Chiefs**	0	6	7	3	**16**

at Arrowhead Stadium, Kansas City, Missouri

- Date: October 7
- Game time: 1:00 p.m. CDT
- Game weather: 67 °F (19 °C)
- Game attendance: 71,414
- Referee: Jack Reader
- TV announcers (NBC): Bill Enis and Kyle Rote
- Box Score

Game information

**First quarter**

- No scoring plays.

**Second quarter**

- KC – Jan Stenerud 38-yard field goal. Chiefs 3–0.
- DEN – Floyd Little 50-yard pass from Charley Johnson (Jim Turner kick). Broncos 7–3.
- KC – Jan Stenerud 40-yard field goal. Broncos 7–6.

**Third quarter**

- KC – Otis Taylor 20-yard pass from Len Dawson (Jan Stenerud kick). Chiefs 13–7.

**Fourth quarter**

- DEN – Joe Dawkins 72-yard run (Jim Turner kick). Broncos 14–13.
- KC – Jan Stenerud 39-yard field goal. Chiefs 16–14.

Top passers

- DEN – Charley Johnson – 10/19, 120 yards, TD, INT
- KC – Len Dawson – 18/29, 170 yards, TD

Top rushers

- DEN – Joe Dawkins – 9 rushes, 93 yards, TD
- KC – Ed Podolak – 16 rushes, 72 yards

Top receivers

- DEN – Floyd Little – 3 receptions, 64 yards, TD
- KC – Ed Podolak – 12 receptions, 84 yards

==== Week 5: at Green Bay Packers ====
Week 5: Kansas City Chiefs at Green Bay Packers – Game summary

Quarter	1	2	3	4	Total
Chiefs	7	0	0	3	**10**
Packers	0	10	0	0	**10**

at Milwaukee County Stadium, Milwaukee, Wisconsin

- Date: October 14
- Game time: 1:00 p.m. CDT
- Game weather: 58 °F (14 °C)
- Game attendance: 46,583
- Referee: Ben Dreith
- TV announcers (NBC): Ross Porter and Willie Davis
- Box Score

Game information

**First quarter**

- KC – Morris Stroud 8-yard pass from Len Dawson (Jan Stenerud kick). Chiefs 7–0.

**Second quarter**

- GB – Chester Marcol 46-yard field goal. Chiefs 7–3.
- GB – Jon Staggers 26-yard pass from Jim Del Gaizo (Chester Marcol kick). Packers 10–7.

**Third quarter**

- No scoring plays.

**Fourth quarter**

- KC – Jan Stenerud 36-yard field goal. Tied 10–10.

Top passers

- KC – Len Dawson – 10/19, 67 yards, TD, INT
- GB – Jim Del Gaizo – 6/12, 89 yards, TD, 2 INT

Top rushers

- KC – Ed Podolak – 15 rushes, 49 yards
- GB – John Brockington – 15 rushes, 106 yards

Top receivers

- KC – Ed Podolak – 6 receptions, 30 yards
- GB – MacArthur Lane – 4 receptions, 38 yards

==== Week 6: at Cincinnati Bengals ====
Week 6: Kansas City Chiefs at Cincinnati Bengals – Game summary

Quarter	1	2	3	4	Total
Chiefs	0	3	3	0	**6**
**Bengals**	0	7	0	7	**14**

at Riverfront Stadium, Cincinnati, Ohio

- Date: October 21
- Game time: 4:00 p.m. EDT
- Game weather: 52 °F (11 °C)
- Game attendance: 56,397
- Referee: Tommy Bell
- TV announcers (KMBC-TV): Bill Enis and Kyle Rote
- Box Score

Game information

**First quarter**

- No scoring plays.

**Second quarter**

- KC – Jan Stenerud 42-yard field goal. Chiefs 3–0.
- CIN – Bob Trumpy 30-yard pass from Ken Anderson (Horst Muhlmann kick). Bengals 7–3.

**Third quarter**

- KC – Jan Stenerud 17-yard field goal. Bengals 7–6.

**Fourth quarter**

- CIN – Boobie Clark 3-yard run. (Horst Muhlmann kick). Bengals 14–6.

Top passers

- KC – Len Dawson – 15/20, 200 yards, 2 INT
- CIN – Ken Anderson – 12/22, 155 yards, TD, 2 INT

Top rushers

- KC – Ed Podolak – 14 rushes, 59 yards
- CIN – Boobie Clark – 26 rushes, 104 yards

Top receivers

- KC – Ed Podolak – 4 receptions, 43 yards
- CIN – Isaac Curtis – 8 receptions, 106 yards

==== Week 7: at Buffalo Bills ====
Week 7: Kansas City Chiefs at Buffalo Bills – Game summary

Quarter	1	2	3	4	Total
Chiefs	0	7	0	7	**14**
**Bills**	14	0	9	0	**23**

at Rich Stadium, Orchard Park, New York

- Date: October 29
- Game time: 9:00 p.m. EST
- Game weather: 45 °F (7 °C)
- Game attendance: 76,071
- Referee: Bernie Ulman
- TV announcers (ABC): Frank Gifford, Don Meredith and Howard Cosell
- Box Score

Game information

**First quarter**

- BUF – O. J. Simpson 1-yard run (John Leypoldt kick). Bills 7–0.
- BUF – O. J. Simpson 4-yard run (Bob Chandler run). Bills 14–0.

**Second quarter**

- KC – Wendell Hayes 1-yard run (Jan Stenerud kick). Bills 14–7.

**Third quarter**

- BUF – John Leypoldt 31-yard field goal. Bills 17–7.
- BUF – John Leypoldt 17-yard field goal. Bills 20–7.
- BUF – John Leypoldt 8-yard field goal. Bills 23–7.

**Fourth quarter**

- KC – Pete Beathard 2-yard run (Jan Stenerud kick). Bills 23–14.

Top passers

- KC – Pete Beathard – 6/23, 73 yards
- BUF – Joe Ferguson – 6/11, 63 yards, INT

Top rushers

- KC – Ed Podolak – 7 rushes, 29 yards
- BUF – O. J. Simpson – 39 rushes, 157 yards, 2 TD

Top receivers

- KC – Wendell Hayes – 2 receptions, 33 yards
- BUF – Bob Chandler – 3 receptions, 35 yards

==== Week 8: at San Diego Chargers ====
Week 8: Kansas City Chiefs at San Diego Chargers – Game summary

Quarter	1	2	3	4	Total
**Chiefs**	6	3	3	7	**19**
Chargers	0	0	0	0	**0**

at San Diego Stadium, San Diego, California

- Date: November 4
- Game time: 1:00 p.m. PST
- Game weather: 61 °F (16 °C)
- Game attendance: 50,234
- Referee: Fred Swearingen
- TV announcers (NBC): Jim Simpson and Kyle Rote
- Box Score

Game information

**First quarter**

- KC – Ed Podolak 5-yard run (kick failed). Chiefs 6–0.

**Second quarter**

- KC – Jan Stenerud 31-yard field goal. Chiefs 9–0.

**Third quarter**

- KC – Jan Stenerud 36-yard field goal. Chiefs 12–0.

**Fourth quarter**

- KC – Morris Stroud 39-yard pass from Mike Livingston (Jan Stenerud kick). Chiefs 19–0.

Top passers

- KC – Mike Livingston – 10/19, 169 yards, TD
- SD – Dan Fouts – 11/29, 128 yards, 3 INT

Top rushers

- KC – Wendell Hayes – 13 rushes, 90 yards
- SD – Mike Garrett – 14 rushes, 51 yards

Top receivers

- KC – Morris Stroud – 2 receptions, 61 yards, TD
- SD – Pettis Norman – 3 receptions, 62 yards

==== Week 9: vs. Chicago Bears ====
Week 9: Chicago Bears at Kansas City Chiefs – Game summary

Quarter	1	2	3	4	Total
Bears	0	0	7	0	**7**
**Chiefs**	3	9	7	0	**19**

at Arrowhead Stadium, Kansas City, Missouri

- Date: November 12
- Game time: 8:00 p.m. CST
- Game weather: 51 °F (11 °C)
- Game attendance: 70,664
- Referee: Fred Silva
- TV announcers (ABC): Frank Gifford, Don Meredith, and Howard Cosell
- Box Score

Game information

**First quarter**

- KC – Jan Stenerud 47-yard field goal. Chiefs 3–0.

**Second quarter**

- KC – Jan Stenerud 17-yard field goal. Chiefs 6–0.
- KC – Jan Stenerud 43-yard field goal. Chiefs 9–0.
- KC – Jan Stenerud 42-yard field goal. Chiefs 12–0.

**Third quarter**

- CHI – Carl Garrett 9-yard run (Mirro Roder kick). Chiefs 12–7.
- KC – Otis Taylor 24-yard pass from Mike Livingston (Jan Stenerud kick). Chiefs 19–7.

**Fourth quarter**

- No scoring plays.

Top passers

- CHI – Bobby Douglass – 9/21, 130 yards, INT
- KC – Mike Livingston – 11/22, 146 yards, TD, 2 INT

Top rushers

- CHI – Carl Garrett – 13 rushes, 42 yards, TD
- KC – Ed Podolak – 28 rushes, 134 yards

Top receivers

- CHI – Carl Garrett – 2 receptions, 62 yards
- KC – Otis Taylor – 3 receptions, 54 yards, TD

==== Week 10: vs. Houston Oilers ====
Week 10: Houston Oilers at Kansas City Chiefs – Game summary

Quarter	1	2	3	4	Total
Oilers	0	0	7	7	**14**
**Chiefs**	7	7	10	14	**38**

at Arrowhead Stadium, Kansas City, Missouri

- Date: November 18
- Game time: 1:00 p.m. CST
- Game weather: 49 °F (9 °C)
- Game attendance: 68,444
- Referee: John McDonough
- TV announcers (NBC): Bill Enis and Dave Kocourek
- Box Score

Game information

**First quarter**

- KC – Gary Butler 5-yard pass from Mike Livingston (Jan Stenerud kick) Chiefs 7–0.

**Second quarter**

- KC – Otis Taylor 24-yard pass from Mike Livingston (Jan Stenerud kick). Chiefs 14–0.

**Third quarter**

- KC – Mike Livingston 3-yard run (Jan Stenerud kick). Chiefs 21–0.
- KC – Jan Stenerud 38-yard field goal. Chiefs 24–0.
- HOU – Bob Gresham 62-yard pass from Lynn Dickey (Skip Butler kick). Chiefs 24–7.

**Fourth quarter**

- HOU – Fred Willis 1-yard run (Skip Butler kick). Chiefs 24–14.
- KC – Willie Ellison 1-yard run (Jan Stenerud kick). Chiefs 31–14.
- KC – John Lohmeyer 19-yard fumble return (Jan Stenerud kick). Chiefs 38–14.

Top passers

- HOU – Lynn Dickey – 12/23, 191 yards, TD, 2 INT
- KC – Mike Livingston – 13/19, 149 yards, 2 TD, INT

Top rushers

- HOU – Fred Willis – 11 rushes, 23 yards, TD
- KC – Ed Podolak – 20 rushes, 82 yards

Top receivers

- HOU – Billy Parks – 6 receptions, 91 yards
- KC – Elmo Wright – 3 receptions, 53 yards

==== Week 11 at Denver Broncos ====
Week 11: Kansas City Chiefs at Denver Broncos – Game summary

Quarter	1	2	3	4	Total
Chiefs	0	3	0	7	**10**
**Broncos**	0	14	0	0	**14**

at Mile High Stadium, Denver, Colorado

- Date: November 25
- Game time: 2:00 p.m. MST
- Game weather: 31 °F (−1 °C)
- Game attendance: 51,331
- Referee: Norm Schachter
- TV announcers (NBC): Charlie Jones and Sam DeLuca
- Box Score

Game information

**First quarter**

- No scoring plays.

**Second quarter**

- KC – Jan Stenerud 38-yard field goal. Chiefs 3–0.
- DEN – Haven Moses 18-yard pass from Charley Johnson (Jim Turner kick). Broncos 7–3.
- DEN – Haven Moses 40-yard pass from Charley Johnson (Jim Turner] kick). Broncos 14–3.

**Third quarter**

- No scoring plays.

**Fourth quarter**

- KC – Otis Taylor 7-yard pass from Mike Livingston (Jan Stenerud kick). Broncos 14–10.

Top passers

- KC – Mike Livingston – 12/31, 129 yards, TD, 2 INT
- DEN – Charley Johnson – 10/21, 144 yards, 2 TD, INT

Top rushers

- KC – Willie Ellison – 19 rushes, 64 yards
- DEN – Floyd Little – 18 rushes, 50 yards

Top receivers

- KC – Otis Taylor – 3 receptions, 50 yards, TD
- DEN – Haven Moses – 5 receptions, 108 yards, 2 TD

==== Week 12 vs Cleveland Browns ====
Week 12: Cleveland Browns at Kansas City Chiefs – Game summary

Quarter	1	2	3	4	Total
Browns	0	3	3	14	**20**
Chiefs	7	0	3	10	**20**

at Arrowhead Stadium, Kansas City, Missouri

- Date: December 2
- Game time: 3:00 p.m. CST
- Game weather: 56 °F (13 °C)
- Game attendance: 70,296
- Referee: Jack Reader
- TV announcers (NBC): Curt Gowdy and Al DeRogatis
- Box Score

Game information

**First quarter**

- KC – Elmo Wright 11-yard pass from Mike Livingston (Jan Stenerud kick). Chiefs 7–0.

**Second quarter**

- CLE – Don Cockroft 44-yard field goal. Chiefs 7–3.

**Third quarter**

- KC – Jan Stenerud 15-yard field goal. Chiefs 10–3.
- CLE – Don Cockroft 28-yard field goal. Chiefs 10–6.

**Fourth quarter**

- KC – Jan Stenerud 13-yard field goal. Chiefs 13–6.
- KC – Ed Podolak 2-yard run (Jan Stenerud kick). Chiefs 20–6.
- CLE – Greg Pruitt 65-yard run (Don Cockroft kick). Chiefs 20–13.
- CLE – Milt Morin 51-yard pass from Mike Phipps (Don Cockroft kick). Tied 20–20.

Top passers

- CLE – Mike Phipps – 13/27, 171 yards, TD, INT
- KC – Mike Livingston – 7/11, 70 yards, TD

Top rushers

- CLE – Greg Pruitt – 15 rushes, 110 yards, TD
- KC – Willie Ellison – 20 rushes, 108 yards

Top receivers

- CLE – Milt Morin – 3 receptions, 86 yards, TD
- KC – Elmo Wright – 5 receptions, 70 yards, TD

==== Week 13: at Oakland Raiders ====
Week 13: Kansas City Chiefs at Oakland Raiders – Game summary

Quarter	1	2	3	4	Total
Chiefs	0	0	7	0	**7**
**Raiders**	7	13	3	14	**37**

at Oakland–Alameda County Coliseum, Oakland, California

- Date: December 8
- Game time: 1:00 p.m. PST
- Game weather: 51 °F (11 °C)
- Game attendance: 53,945
- Referee: Tommy Bell
- TV announcers (NBC): Curt Gowdy and Al DeRogatis
- Box Score

Game information

**First quarter**

- OAK – Fred Biletnikoff 9-yard pass from Ken Stabler (George Blanda kick). Raiders 7–0.

**Second quarter**

- OAK – Marv Hubbard 31-yard run (George Blanda kick). Raiders 14–0.
- OAK – George Blanda 20-yard field goal. Raiders 17–0.
- OAK – George Blanda 28-yard field goal. Raiders 20–0.

**Third quarter**

- OAK – George Blanda 27-yard field goal. Raiders 23–0.
- KC – Mike Livingston 17-yard run (Jan Stenerud kick). Raiders 23–7.

**Fourth quarter**

- OAK – Charlie Smith 10-yard run (George Blanda kick). Raiders 30–7.
- OAK – Cliff Branch 3-yard pass from Ken Stabler (George Blanda kick). Raiders 37–7.

Top passers

- KC – Mike Livingston – 6/14, 66 yards, INT
- OAK – Ken Stabler – 10/19, 88 yards, 2 TD

Top rushers

- KC – Mike Livingston – 1 rush, 17 yards, TD
- OAK – Marv Hubbard – 25 rushes, 115 yards, TD

Top receivers

- KC – Ed Podolak – 7 receptions, 65 yards
- OAK – Mike Siani – 5 receptions, 43 yards

==== Week 14: vs. San Diego Chargers ====
Week 14: San Diego Chargers at Kansas City Chiefs – Game summary

Quarter	1	2	3	4	Total
Chargers	3	0	3	0	**6**
**Chiefs**	10	3	10	10	**33**

at Arrowhead Stadium, Kansas City, Missouri

- Date: December 16
- Game time: 1:00 p.m. CST
- Game weather: 20 °F (−7 °C)
- Game attendance: 43,755
- Referee: Chuck Heberling
- TV announcers (NBC): Ross Porter and Willie Davis
- Box Score

Game information

**First quarter**

- KC – Ed Podolak 1-yard run (Jan Stenerud kick). Chiefs 7–0.
- SD – Ray Wersching 22-yard field goal. Chiefs 7–3.
- KC – Jan Stenerud 45-yard field goal. Chiefs 10–3.

**Second quarter**

- KC – Jan Stenerud 36-yard field goal. Chiefs 13–3.

**Third quarter**

- KC – Jan Stenerud 20-yard field goal. Chiefs 16–3.
- SD – Ray Wersching 26-yard field goal. Chiefs 16–6.
- KC – Jeff Kinney 5-yard run (Jan Stenerud kick). Chiefs 23–6.

**Fourth quarter**

- KC – Wendell Hayes 2-yard run (Jan Stenerud kick). Chiefs 30–6.
- KC – Jan Stenerud 27-yard field goal. Chiefs 33–6.

Top passers

- SD – Dan Fouts – 9/14, 97 yards
- KC – Mike Livingston – 11/22, 123 yards

Top rushers

- SD – Robert Holmes – 9 rushes, 27 yards
- KC – Ed Podolak – 13 rushes, 50 yards, TD

Top receivers

- SD – Robert Holmes – 5 receptions, 50 yards
- KC – Jeff Kinney – 2 receptions, 42 yards

== Standings ==
AFC West
	W	L	T	PCT	DIV	CONF	PF	PA	STK
Oakland Raiders	9	4	1	.679	4–1–1	7–3–1	292	175	W4
Kansas City Chiefs	7	5	2	.571	4–2	6–4–1	231	192	W1
Denver Broncos	7	5	2	.571	3–2–1	7–2–1	354	296	L1
San Diego Chargers	2	11	1	.179	0–6	1–9–1	188	386	L4
