= 1971 AFC Divisional playoff game (Miami–Kansas City) =

NFL playoff game

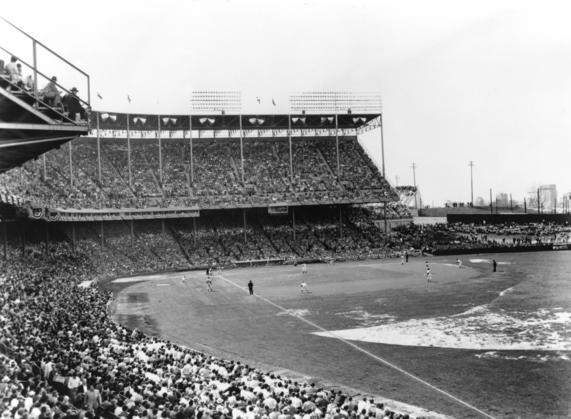
- The game was played at Kansas City Municipal Stadium in Kansas City, Missouri
Miami Dolphins (10–3–1)	Kansas City Chiefs (10–3–1)
27	24
Head coach: Don Shula	Head coach: Hank Stram
	1	2	3	4	OT	2OT	Total
MIA	0	10	7	7	0	3	27
KC	10	0	7	7	0	0	24
- Date: December 25, 1971
- Stadium: Municipal Stadium; Kansas City, Missouri
- Favorite: Chiefs by 3.0
- Referee: John McDonough
- Attendance: 50,861

TV in the United States
- Network: NBC
- Announcers: Curt Gowdy (play-by-play); Al DeRogatis (color commentator)

The 1971 Miami Dolphins–Kansas City Chiefs AFC Divisional playoff game was a National Football League (NFL) game played between the Miami Dolphins and Kansas City Chiefs on December 25, 1971, at Municipal Stadium in Kansas City, Missouri, as part of the 1971–72 NFL playoffs. The game was won by the Dolphins 27–24 in double overtime in what is currently the longest game in NFL history.

The game is widely regarded as one of the greatest in National Football League history and is notable for being the longest game ever played in NFL and professional football history, lasting 82 minutes and 40 seconds of game time. It was the first NFL playoff game to reach a second overtime period.

== Background ==
Both teams finished the 1971 NFL season with identical 10–3–1 records to win their respective divisions and qualify for the playoffs.

The season was only the sixth for the Dolphins, who had gone 35–46–3 in their first six seasons and had only made the playoffs once, losing 14–21 to the Oakland Raiders in the divisional round the prior season.

The game marked the Chiefs' final game at Kansas City Municipal Stadium, with Arrowhead Stadium scheduled to open the following season, as well as the only playoff game to be played at the stadium.

== Game summary ==
=== First quarter ===
The Chiefs struck first with a 24-yard field goal by Jan Stenerud. Following an interception by Willie Lanier of Bob Griese and 17 yard return, Len Dawson threw a 7-yard touchdown pass to Ed Podolak, increasing the Chiefs' lead to 10–0.

=== Second quarter ===
Following the Chiefs' touchdown, on the Dolphins' next drive, Griese completed a 23-yard pass to Paul Warfield and a 16-yard pass to Marv Fleming to set up a 1-yard touchdown run by Larry Csonka, narrowing the Chiefs' lead to 10–7. A Podolak fumble deep in Chiefs territory was recovered by the Dolphins' defense, allowing for a 14-yard field goal by Garo Yepremian to tie the game at 10–10 shortly before halftime.

=== Third quarter ===
Following a 10-minute, 15-play, 75-yard drive culminating in a 1-yard touchdown run by Jim Otis, the Chiefs retook a 17–10 lead. The Dolphins answered with a 1-yard touchdown run from Jim Kiick to retie the game at 17–17.

=== Fourth quarter ===
Dolphins linebacker Nick Buoniconti recovered a fumble to give them a scoring opportunity before Chiefs linebacker Jim Lynch intercepted Griese on the Chiefs' 9-yard line. Following a 91-yard drive that included a 63-yard pass to rookie wide receiver Elmo Wright, The Chiefs retook a 24–17 lead with a 3-yard touchdown run by Podolak. The Dolphins immediately rattled off a 71-yard drive with passes by Griese to Warfield of 17 and 26 yards culminating with a 5-yard touchdown pass to Fleming, tying the game at 24–24 with under two minutes left in regulation. Podolak returned the kickoff 78 yards to the Dolphins' 22-yard line, opening the door for Stenerud to kick a game-winning field goal for the Chiefs in the final minute of regulation. However, he missed the 31-yarder wide right, allowing the Dolphins to regain possession. The Chiefs defense was able to force the Dolphins to punt as time expired. The Chiefs elected to not attempt a 68-yard fair catch kick, fearing a return by Mercury Morris, sending the game to overtime.

=== Overtime ===
The Chiefs won the coin toss and received the opening kickoff of the first overtime period, with Podolak returning it to the 46-yard line. The Chiefs got into scoring range, but Stenerud's 42-yard field goal attempt was blocked. The Chiefs defense forced the Dolphins to punt, before the Dolphins defense forced a Chiefs punt on a three-and-out. The Dolphins advanced the ball to the Chiefs' 45-yard line where Yepremian attempted a 52-yard field goal, but it was short. The Chiefs advanced the ball to midfield before Dawson threw a pass deep in Dolphins' territory that was intercepted by Dolphins safety Jake Scott and returned to the 46-yard line as the clock expired, sending the game to a second overtime for the first time in NFL playoff history (prior to the AFL–NFL merger, the 1962 American Football League Championship Game went to a second overtime).

=== Second overtime ===
Following the interception, the Chiefs defense forced a Dolphins punt on a three-and-out. During the drive, as the clock went down past 12:06 during a tackle for loss of Podolak by Manny Fernandez on second down, the game became the longest game in professional football history, a record it still holds to this day. Podolak got the yards back on third down, but the Chiefs were still held to a punt, which was fair caught at the 30-yard line by Scott.

==== Game-winning drive ====
Following the fair catch, Kiick ran for 5 yards to advance the Dolphins to the 35-yard line. Griese then called for a running play that had not been used yet in the game, "Roll Right, Trap Left". Csonka, led by pulling guard Larry Little, then took off over the left side of the line for 29 yards to put the Dolphins in Chiefs' territory at their 36-yard line. Following a 2-yard run by Kiick, 4-yard run by Csonka, and run for no gain by Kiick, the Dolphins faced fourth down at the Chiefs' 30-yard line, setting up a field goal attempt by Yepremian. Yepremian made the ensuing 37-yard field goal at 7:40 into the second overtime, ending the longest game in NFL history at 82 minutes, 40 seconds with a 27–24 win for the Dolphins.

=== Box Score ===
1971 AFC Divisional Playoffs: Miami Dolphins at Kansas City Chiefs – Game summary

Quarter	1	2	3	4	OT	2OT	Total
Dolphins	0	10	7	7	0	3	27
Chiefs	10	0	7	7	0	0	24

at Municipal Stadium, Kansas City, Missouri

- Game time: 4:00 p.m. EST
- Game weather: 47 °F (8 °C)
- Game attendance: 50,861
- Referee: John McDonough
- TV announcers (NBC): Curt Gowdy and Al DeRogatis
- Box Score

Game information
First quarter
- KC – Jan Stenerud 24-yard field goal. Chiefs 3–0
- KC – Ed Podolak 7-yard pass from Len Dawson (Jan Stenerud kick). Chiefs 10–0

Second quarter

- MIA – Larry Csonka 1-yard run (Garo Yepremian kick). Chiefs 10–7
- MIA – Garo Yepremian 14-yard field goal. Tied 10–10

Third quarter

- KC – Jim Otis 1-yard run (Jan Stenerud kick). Chiefs 17–10
- MIA – Jim Kiick 1-yard run (Garo Yepremian kick). Tied 17–17

Fourth quarter

- KC – Ed Podolak 3-yard run (Jan Stenerud kick). Chiefs 24–17
- MIA – Marv Fleming 5-yard pass from Bob Griese (Garo Yepremian kick). Tied 24–24

Overtime

- No scoring plays.

Second overtime

- MIA – Garo Yepremian 37-yard field goal. Dolphins 27–24

== Aftermath ==
The game was the first playoff win in the Dolphins' young franchise history. The Dolphins advanced to the AFC Championship Game, where they blanked the Baltimore Colts 21–0 to advance to Super Bowl VI, losing 24–3 to the Dallas Cowboys. The Dolphins would go on make the following two Super Bowls, winning both, including a perfect season the following year.

The Chiefs would not reach the playoffs again until 1986 and would not reach the Divisional Round again until 1991.

Due to the game being played on Christmas, the NFL received numerous complaints, due to how it caused affected Christmas dinners around the nation, as well as playing the game on a traditional religious and family holiday, with a Kansas state legislator proposing a bill to ban the scheduling of future games on December 25. Due to these complaints, the NFL would deliberately set the schedule in later seasons to avoid having any games on Christmas. When Christmas fell on a Sunday in 1977, 1983, and 1988, the NFL scheduled the divisional round games set for that weekend on December 24 and 26. When Christmas fell on a Saturday in 1976 and 1982, the NFL started the season a week earlier to play conference championship games on December 26 in 1976 and started the season a week later with the regular season set to end with every team playing on December 26 (though a strike would delay the season ending by a week) in 1982. It would not be until a Monday Night Football game in 1989 between Cincinnati and Minnesota that another NFL game would be played on Christmas. Following that, through 2020, whenever Christmas fell on a Saturday, Sunday, or Monday (as well as a Friday in 2009 and 2020), the NFL scheduled at least one game. Starting in 2021, the NFL began regularly scheduling multiple games on Christmas, regardless of day of the week.

Following the game, an estimated 20,000 Dolphins fans waited for the team to return at Miami International Airport, a surprise to the team, who usually only had few people wait for them.

Yepremian, whose kick won the Dolphins the game, was presented with two bottles of champagne by the president of the charter's airline. He was escorted to the police station in the basement for a celebration. Following his return home, the whole block was decorated and neighborhood kids (one of which was future MLB pitcher Marty Bystrom) knocked on his door.

Dolphins coach Don Shula and his son David found their car unable to start and had to hitchhike back to their home with the help of a Dolphins fan, who they invited in for a drink to thank after being dropped off.

== Legacy ==
Chiefs running back Ed Podolak's 350 total yards (110 receiving, 85 rushing, 155 return) remain an NFL playoff record.

Dolphins wide receiver Paul Warfield finished with a career postseason high 140 yards.

The game was ranked No. 18 on the “NFL 100 Greatest Games” list.

== See also ==
- NFL on Christmas Day
