= Ed Podolak =

American football player (born 1947)

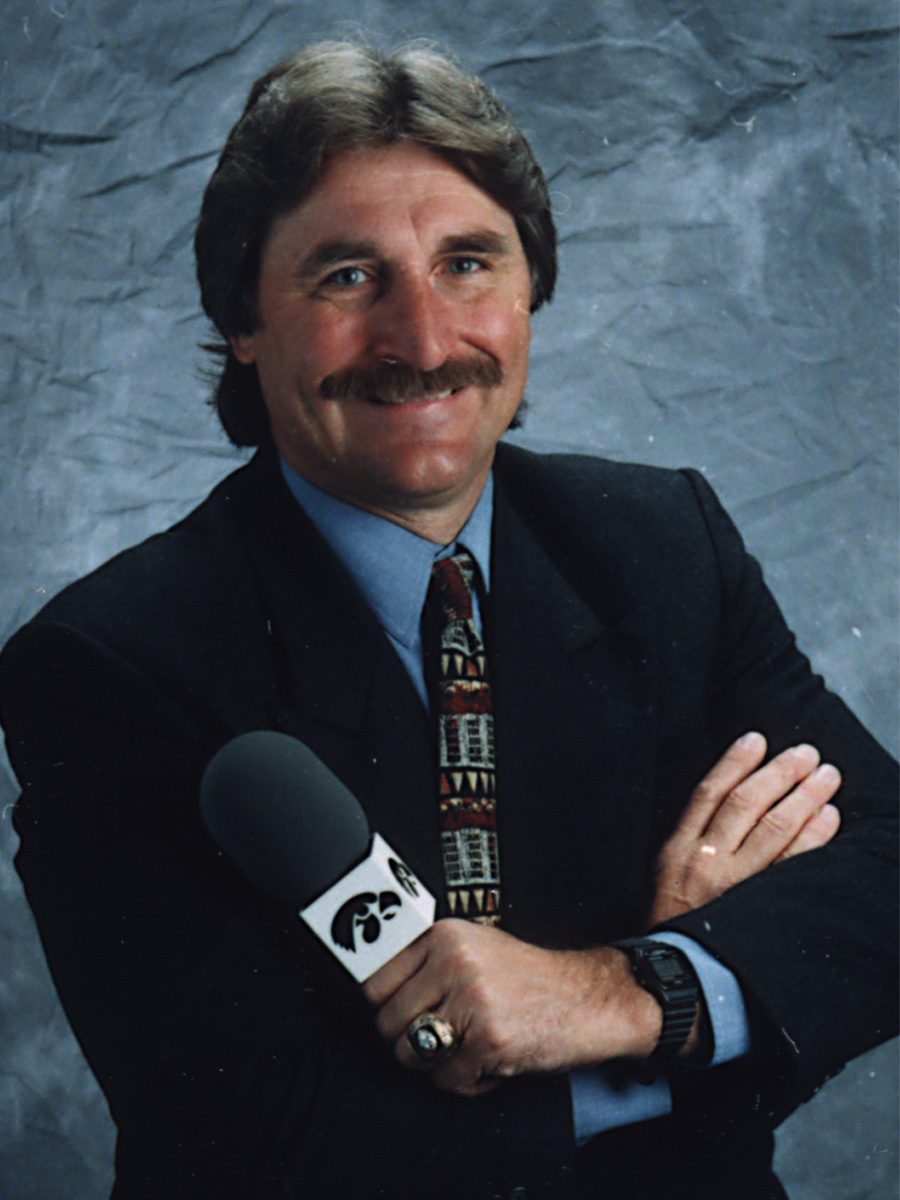

No. 14
- Position: Running back

Personal information
- Born: September 1, 1947 (age 79); Atlantic, Iowa, U.S.
- Listed height: 6 ft 1 in (1.85 m)
- Listed weight: 204 lb (93 kg)

Career information
- High school: Atlantic
- College: Iowa
- NFL draft: 1969: 2nd round, 48th overall pick

Career history
- Kansas City Chiefs (1969-1977)

Awards and highlights
- Super Bowl champion (IV); AFL champion (1969); Kansas City Chiefs Hall of Honor; First-team All-Big Ten (1968)

Career NFL/AFL statistics
- Rushing yards: 4,451
- Rushing average: 3.8
- Receptions: 288
- Receiving yards: 2,456
- Total touchdowns: 40
- Stats at Pro Football Reference

Edward Joseph Podolak (born September 1, 1947) is an American former professional football player who was a running back for nine seasons with the Kansas City Chiefs of the American Football League (AFL) and National Football League (NFL). He played college football for the Iowa Hawkeyes.

== Early life ==
Ed Podolak was born on a small farm near Atlantic, Iowa on September 1, 1947. His father, Joe was a farmer and a military veteran and his mother Dorothy was a school teacher. Ed worked on the farm, played baseball in the summer, football in the fall, and basketball in the winter. His parents allowed him to curtail his farm work during his athletic events.

The Atlantic High School Trojan football teams went undefeated in Podolak's junior and senior seasons, as Ed quarterbacked the team, winning conference titles both years. The Atlantic Trojan basketball team made it to two state tournament appearances, with Podolak playing forward. Following high school, Iowa State University hired Podolak's high school coach, Howard Justice, to coach quarterbacks, but Podolak chose to attend the University of Iowa.

== College football career ==
In this era, college freshmen were not eligible to play varsity sports, but Podolak won the starting quarterback job for Iowa as a sophomore. In his first college start, Podolak was named “Offensive Player of the Week” after the game against the Arizona Wildcats, a 42–7 Iowa victory. After starting at quarterback for two and a half years for the Hawkeyes, he moved to tailback, five games into his senior season, because of an injury to the starting tailback. He set a Hawkeye and Big 10 rushing record of 286 yards in his second start at running back.

In Podolak's college football career at the University of Iowa, he was a quarterback for two seasons before converting to running back. As a quarterback, Podolak threw 28 interceptions and eight touchdowns, but he excelled as a running back in 1968, rushing for 937 yards and eight touchdowns while gaining an average of six yards per carry, also catching 12 passes for 188 yards and another score.

In 1968, Podolak rushed for a then–Big Ten record with 286 yards on 17 carries in the Hawkeyes' 68–34 victory over Northwestern. Podolak earned All–Big 10 honors following the 1968 season.

== Professional football career ==
Podolak was selected in the second round of the 1969 NFL/AFL draft, 48th overall, by the Kansas City Chiefs, and the team won Super Bowl IV in his rookie season.

During a nine-year career from 1969 to 1977, Podolak became the Chiefs' all-time leading rusher with 4,451 yards and 34 touchdowns on 1,158 carries. He was also known for his work as a pass receiver, catching 288 passes for 2,456 yards and six touchdowns and as a return man on special teams, averaging 8.6 yards per punt and 20.5 yards per kickoff return. His 8,178 career combined yards are the second-most in the team's history. Podolak led the Chiefs in rushing four times, in receiving three times, and in punt returns three times.

In the Chiefs' playoff loss to the Miami Dolphins on Christmas Day in 1971 (still the longest game in NFL history), Podolak had a playoff-record 350 total yards: 85 rushing, 110 receiving, and 155 on returns. Podolak, who wore jersey number 14, was inducted into the Chiefs' Hall of Fame in 1989.

== NFL career statistics ==
Legend
	Led the league
	Won the Super Bowl
**Bold**	Career high

Year	Team	Games		Rushing						Receiving					Fumbles	
Year	Team	GP	GS	Att	Yds	Avg	Y/G	Lng	TD	Rec	Yds	Avg	Lng	TD	Fum	FR
1969	KC	4	0	Did not record any rushing stats											3	0
1970	KC	14	9	168	**749**	**4.5**	53.5	**65**	3	26	307	11.8	**59**	1	6	**1**
1971	KC	13	11	184	708	3.8	**54.5**	25	**9**	36	252	7.0	23	0	5	0
1972	KC	13	10	171	615	3.6	47.3	30	4	46	345	7.5	27	**2**	**10**	**1**
1973	KC	14	13	**210**	721	3.4	51.5	25	3	**55**	**445**	8.1	25	0	7	**1**
1974	KC	9	8	101	386	3.8	42.9	14	2	43	306	7.1	26	1	4	0
1975	KC	14	4	102	351	3.4	25.1	25	3	37	332	9.0	21	2	3	0
1976	KC	10	4	88	371	4.2	37.1	22	5	13	156	**12.0**	23	0	2	0
1977	KC	13	6	133	550	4.1	42.3	41	5	32	313	9.8	23	0	2	**1**
Career		104	65	1,157	4,451	3.8	42.8	65	34	288	2,456	8.5	59	6	42	4

== Broadcasting career ==
After retirement, Podolak turned to broadcasting. He worked as a color commentator for NFL telecasts on NBC in 1978. In 1982, he began working as a commentator for Iowa Hawkeye football games on WHO radio in Des Moines and a statewide network. He worked with play-by-play announcer Jim Zabel until 1996 and then with Gary Dolphin. Podolak announced on April 22, 2024 that he was retiring from his role as a football color analyst after 42 years.

== Awards and honors ==
- Podolak was inducted into the Kansas City Chiefs Hall of Fame in 1989.
- The Iowa High School Athletic Association inducted Podolak into its Football Hall of Fame in 2004.
- In 2014, Podolak was inducted into the Missouri Sports Hall of Fame.
- Podolak was inducted into the University of Iowa Athletics Hall of Fame in 2021.

== Political activism ==
In the 1972 United States presidential election, Podolak endorsed and campaigned for George McGovern over sitting President Richard Nixon. Discussing the election, he cited McGovern's support for small farmers and his ideas on the inheritance tax as reasons for his support.

== See also ==
- List of American Football League players
