= Keith Best (American football) =

American football player (born 1950)

No. 52
- Position: Linebacker

Personal information
- Born: August 21, 1950 (age 76); Canton, Ohio, U.S.
- Listed height: 6 ft 3 in (1.91 m)
- Listed weight: 220 lb (100 kg)

Career information
- High school: Lincoln
- College: Kansas State
- NFL draft: 1972: undrafted

Career history
- Kansas City Chiefs (1972); Minnesota Vikings (1973)*; Chicago Fire (1974)
- * Offseason or practice squad member only
- Stats at Pro Football Reference

Keith Alan Best (born August 21, 1950) is an American former professional football player who was a linebacker for the Kansas City Chiefs of National Football League (NFL). He played college football for the Kansas State University.
