= Hank Stram =

American football coach (1923–2005)

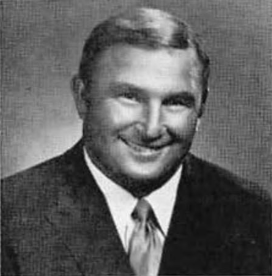
- Stram, c. 1974

Personal information
- Born: January 3, 1923; Chicago, Illinois, U.S.
- Died: July 4, 2005 (aged 82); Covington, Louisiana, U.S.

Career information
- High school: Lew Wallace (Gary, Indiana)
- College: Purdue

Career history
- Purdue (1948–1955) Backfield coach; SMU (1956) Backfield coach; Notre Dame (1957–1958) Backfield coach; Miami (FL) (1959) Backfield coach; Dallas Texans / Kansas City Chiefs (1960–1974) Head coach; New Orleans Saints (1976–1977) Head coach

Awards and highlights
- Super Bowl champion (IV); 3× AFL champion (1962, 1966, 1969); 2× AP AFL Coach of the Year (1966, 1968); UPI AFL Coach of the Year (1968); Kansas City Chiefs Hall of Fame

Head coaching record
- Regular season: 131–97–10 (.571)
- Postseason: 5–3 (.625)
- Career: 136–100–10 (.573)
- Coaching profile at Pro Football Reference
- Pro Football Hall of Fame

Henry Louis Stram (/ˈstræm/; January 3, 1923 – July 4, 2005) was an American football coach. He is best known for his 15-year tenure with the Dallas Texans / Kansas City Chiefs of the American Football League (AFL) and National Football League (NFL).

Stram won three AFL championships, more than any other coach in the league's history. He then won Super Bowl IV with the Chiefs. He also coached the most victories (87), had the most post-season games (7) and the best post-season record in the AFL (5–2). Stram is largely responsible for the introduction of Gatorade to the NFL due to his close association with Ray Graves, coach at the University of Florida during Gatorade's development and infancy. Stram never had an offensive coordinator, defensive coordinator, or special teams coach during his career with the Chiefs.

== Early life ==
Stram was born in Chicago as Henry Louis Wilczek on January 3, 1923. His Polish-born father, Henry Wilczek, a tailor, had wrestled professionally under the name Stramm, the German word for "sturdy," and the family's surname was eventually changed to Stram. He later grew up in Gary, Indiana, and graduated from Lew Wallace High School class of 1941. (The football stadium press box was renamed in his honor.) He earned seven letters playing football and baseball and joined the Sigma Chi fraternity at Purdue in the 1940s, playing in 1942 and again in 1946 and 1947. Stram served in the United States Army Air Forces during World War II, interrupting his university career.

== Coaching career ==
=== Early jobs ===
He was an assistant football coach for the Boilermakers from 1948 to 1955 and the head baseball coach from 1951 to 1955. In 1996, Stram and Len Dawson were inducted into the Purdue Athletic Hall of Fame. After coaching at Purdue, Stram was an assistant at Notre Dame, Southern Methodist University, and Miami. Stram was Miami's backfield coach and credited with installing the multiple offense that helped lead the team to a 6–4 record in 1959.

=== Dallas Texans / Kansas City Chiefs ===
In 1959, Lamar Hunt recruited Stram to coach his Dallas Texans in the new AFL, which commenced play in 1960. Hunt had previously been a bench player at SMU when Stram had been coaching there and the Texans' position had been turned down by Oklahoma Sooners head coach Bud Wilkinson and New York Giants defensive coordinator Tom Landry. The Texans played their first game in the new AFL in September 1960 and proved to be successful from the beginning.

In 1962, the Texans won the AFL Western Division and the AFL championship. The Texans won the championship against the Houston Oilers 20–17 in what was the longest professional football championship game ever played. Tommy Brooker kicked a field goal at 17:54 of overtime to win the game for the Texans and stop the Oilers from winning their third straight title.

The Dallas Texans became the Kansas City Chiefs in 1963 and continued their success. In 1966, they won the AFL title again on the back of one of the best defensive teams in the history of professional football featuring three hall of famers and eight all star players. The Chiefs defeated the Buffalo Bills 31–7 in Buffalo. The Chiefs played the Green Bay Packers in Super Bowl I with the Packers winning 35–10. To overcome the Chiefs' defense, Packers' coach Vince Lombardi used a short passing game which proved successful, with quarterback Bart Starr becoming the first Super Bowl MVP.

In a 1968 game against the Oakland Raiders in Kansas City, the Chiefs entered the game without a healthy wide receiver ready to play. Stram went in to pro football's past and resurrected the T formation. The Chiefs won the game 24–10 running the ball 60 times for over 300 yards while passing only three times for 16 yards.

The Kansas City Chiefs won the AFL championship again in 1969. In Super Bowl IV, his ingenious innovations, the "moving pocket" and the "triple-stack defense", dominated the Minnesota Vikings on both sides of the ball. In the Super Bowl, Stram became the first professional football coach to wear a microphone. Stram's recorded comments from that game have become classics: "Just keep matriculatin' the ball down the field, boys.", "How could all six of you miss that play?" "65 Toss Power Trap", "Kassulke was running around there like it was a Chinese fire drill", and his assessment of the Vikings' confusion and ineffective play: "They look like they're flat as hell.". In the clip where he asks an official "How could all six of you miss that play?" the official's response, not about the play, but about Stram not being allowed on the field during a game, leads the confused Stram to mutter, "No. What?" The Super Bowl victory was the second straight by a team from the AFL and added credibility to the newer league, which would complete a planned merger with the NFL the following season.

In 1971, the Chiefs won the AFC West championship. The Miami Dolphins defeated the Chiefs on Christmas Day 1971. The teams played the longest game in the history of professional football. After that, the Chiefs did not enjoy the same success, resulting in Stram leaving the franchise. Stram's tenure in Kansas City ended with a 35–15 loss at home to the same Viking team the Chiefs defeated in Super Bowl IV.

Following a 5–9 finish in the 1974 season, which was at the time the worst record in franchise history (and only the third losing season it had suffered), Stram was fired.

Stram's 129 victories were the most in Chiefs history until 2023 when Andy Reid surpassed him with his 130th win.

=== New Orleans Saints ===
Stram became the head coach of the New Orleans Saints in 1976, but posted losing records in his two seasons, 4–10 and 3–11. Hampering Stram's efforts to rebuild the typically struggling Saints was a severe elbow injury to quarterback Archie Manning, who missed the entire 1976 season and parts of the 1977 campaign. Stram also had to deal with continuous discipline problems caused by his leading rusher, Chuck Muncie, who was in the early stages of a cocaine addiction which would lead to his trade in 1980 from New Orleans to the San Diego Chargers.

Perhaps the biggest highlight of his New Orleans tenure was a 27–17 win over his former team, the Kansas City Chiefs, at Arrowhead Stadium in 1976, Stram's first victory with the Saints. The 1977 campaign culminated in an historic home loss to the previously winless Tampa Bay Buccaneers who were riding a 26-game losing streak over two seasons. Stram took the loss hard, burning the game film. He was fired after the final game of the season.

=== Legacy ===
Stram helped develop Hall of Famers Len Dawson, Bobby Bell, Buck Buchanan, Curley Culp, Willie Lanier, Jan Stenerud, Emmitt Thomas, and Johnny Robinson, and others like Ed Budde and Otis Taylor. He would take players that had been unsuccessful on other teams, such as Len Dawson, who had failed to catch on with both the Steelers and the Browns, and help them develop their potential. Stram recruited heavily from historically black colleges, so his teams were diverse, and he also instituted weight-training and off-season mini-camps. He was also the first coach in professional football to use Gatorade on his sidelines and run both the I formation and two-tight end offense, still used in professional football today. On defense, the Chiefs employed a triple-stack defense, hiding the three linebackers behind defensive linemen.

He was considered a motivational genius, and his emphasis on the Chiefs' wearing of a patch commemorating the AFL in Super Bowl IV was one of his typical ploys, extracting maximum effort from players who had been derided by proponents of the NFL. Stram was inducted into the Pro Football Hall of Fame in 2003. At the Hall of Fame ceremonies, Stram was so weakened by the effects of diabetes that Len Dawson pushed his former coach onto the stage in a wheelchair. Stram's induction speech was then played from a previously recorded videotape.

Stram was the only head coach who lasted the entire history of the AFL (1960 – 1969).

== Broadcasting career ==
Following his retirement from coaching, Stram enjoyed a long and successful career as a color commentator on CBS' television and radio broadcasts of NFL games. Stram began broadcasting games for CBS in 1975, originally calling games with Frank Glieber. After a brief hiatus so he could return to coaching, Stram returned to call games with Gary Bender in 1978. His other broadcast partners were Jack Buck, Vin Scully, Curt Gowdy, Dick Stockton, Al Michaels, Tim Brant, Steve Zabriskie, Jim Henderson, Sean McDonough, and Jim Nantz, along with various others. From 1979 through 1989 he called the Tampa Bay Buccaneers' preseason football games for WTOG-TV in Tampa, Florida, and from 1993 through 1996 he called preseason Los Angeles/Oakland Raiders' games for KCAL.

As a broadcaster, Stram is best remembered for his near-20-year stint (beginning in 1978 and lasting through the 1995 season) with Jack Buck on CBS Radio broadcasts of Monday Night Football games. Stram's key broadcasting trademark was his habit of predicting the next play before it happened.

On January 10, 1982, Stram, along with Vin Scully, called the famous NFC Championship Game between the San Francisco 49ers and the Dallas Cowboys. The game in question was immortalized by Dwight Clark's touchdown catch which elevated the 49ers into their first Super Bowl appearance (the first of four during the 1980s).

During a 1988 broadcasting trip to Indianapolis for a Chicago Bears–Colts game, Stram collapsed with a severely blocked aortic valve and underwent open heart surgery. He was hospitalized in Indianapolis for a week and later resumed his career with CBS.

He remained a part of CBS' television broadcast team until 1993. His last game as a broadcaster was Super Bowl XXX for CBS Radio in 1996.

== Personal life ==
Stram married Phyllis Marie Pesha in 1953 and they stayed together as husband and wife until his death due to complications from diabetes in 2005. They had six children, four sons and two daughters, including actor Henry Stram.

=== Later life and death ===
Stram made a guest appearance as himself on the TV show Coach. In the episode, Stram was attending a coaching convention with fellow coaches Barry Switzer and George Allen. Hayden Fox, the fictional protagonist of the show, also attended the conference.

Hank Stram retired to New Orleans, Louisiana, where he built a home in the town of Covington. He died at St. Tammany Parish hospital in Covington, from complications due to diabetes, on July 4, 2005.

== Head coaching record ==
Team	Year	Regular season					Postseason			
Team	Year	Won	Lost	Ties	Win %	Finish	Won	Lost	Win %	Result
DAT	1960	8	6	0	.571	2nd in AFL West	—	—	—	—
DAT	1961	6	8	0	.429	2nd in AFL West	—	—	—	—
DAT	1962	11	3	0	.786	1st in AFL West	1	0	1.000	AFL champions
KC	1963	5	7	2	.417	3rd in AFL West	—	—	—	—
KC	1964	7	7	0	.500	2nd in AFL West	—	—	—	—
KC	1965	7	5	2	.583	3rd in AFL West	—	—	—	—
KC	1966	11	2	1	.846	1st in AFL West	1	1	.500	AFL champions. Lost to Green Bay Packers in Super Bowl I
KC	1967	9	5	0	.643	2nd in AFL West	—	—	—	—
KC	1968	12	2	0	.857	1st in AFL West	0	1	.000	Lost to Oakland Raiders in AFL Division Playoff
KC	1969	11	3	0	.786	2nd in AFL West	3	0	1.000	AFL champions. Super Bowl IV champions
KC	1970	7	5	2	.583	2nd in AFC West	—	—	—	—
KC	1971	10	3	1	.769	1st in AFC West	0	1	.000	Lost to Miami Dolphins in AFC Divisional Game
KC	1972	8	6	0	.571	2nd in AFC West	—	—	—	—
KC	1973	7	5	2	.583	2nd in AFC West	—	—	—	—
KC	1974	5	9	0	.357	3rd in AFC West	—	—	—	—
DAT/KC total		124	76	10	.620		5	3	.625	
NO	1976	4	10	0	.286	3rd in NFC West	—	—	—	—
NO	1977	3	11	0	.214	4th in NFC West	—	—	—	—
NO total		7	21	0	.250		0	0	.000	
Total		131	97	10	.575		5	3	.625	

== See also ==
- American Football League players, coaches, and contributors
- List of Kansas City Chiefs head coaches
- List of National Football League head coaches with 50 wins

== Sources ==
- Hank Stram with Lou Sahadi, They're Playing My Game, Morrow, New York 1986 ISBN 0-688-06080-3
- Edward Gruver, The American Football League: A Year-by-Year History 1960–1969 McFarland & Company 1997 ISBN 0-7864-0399-3
- Brad Adler, Coaching Matters: Leadership & Tactics of the NFL's Ten Greatest Coaches Brassey's Inc 2003 pages 56–57 ISBN 1-57488-613-4
- "Stram gets Texan post", Dallas Morning News December 21, 1959
- "Texans now rule AFL kingdom", Dallas Morning News December 24, 1962
- MacCambridge, Michael (2005), America's Game. New York:Anchor Books. ISBN 978-0-307-48143-6
