= Kerry Reardon =

American football player (born 1949)

No. 15
- Position: Cornerback

Personal information
- Born: May 6, 1949 (age 77); Kansas City, Missouri, U.S.
- Listed height: 5 ft 11 in (1.80 m)
- Listed weight: 180 lb (82 kg)

Career information
- High school: Rockhurst (Kansas City)
- College: Iowa
- NFL draft: 1971: 6th round, 146th overall pick

Career history
- Kansas City Chiefs (1971–1976)

Career NFL statistics
- Interceptions: 14
- Interception yards: 83
- Fumble recoveries: 2
- Stats at Pro Football Reference

Kerry Edward Reardon (born May 6, 1949) is an American former professional football player who was a cornerback in the National Football League (NFL). He played college football for the Iowa Hawkeyes and was selected by the Kansas City Chiefs in the sixth round of the 1971 NFL draft.

== See also ==
- List of NCAA major college yearly punt and kickoff return leaders
