= Kansas City Chiefs all-time roster =

1,379 players have appeared in at least one regular season or postseason game in the National Football League (NFL) or American Football League (AFL) for the Kansas City Chiefs franchise since 1960. This list is accurate through the end of the 2025 NFL season.

== A ==
- Husain Abdullah
- Bud Abell
- Bill Acker
- Kenneth Acker
- Mike Adamle
- Tony Adams
- Mark Adickes
- Kevin Adkins
- Ben Agajanian
- Tommie Agee
- Louie Aguiar
- Branden Albert
- Arnold Ale
- D. J. Alexander
- Derrick Alexander
- Darnell Alford
- Nick Allegretti
- Andy Alleman
- Jared Allen
- Jeff Allen
- Marcus Allen
- Nate Allen
- Taje Allen
- John Alt
- Ugo Amadi
- Matt Ammendola
- Kimble Anders
- Jason Andersen
- Morten Andersen
- Charlie Anderson
- Curtis Anderson
- Darren Anderson
- Erick Anderson
- Zayne Anderson
- Billy Andrews
- Zenon Andrusyshyn
- Charlie Ane III
- Felix Anudike-Uzomah
- Matt Araiza
- Fred Arbanas
- Javier Arenas
- Jim Arnold
- Walt Arnold
- Jon Asamoah
- Walker Lee Ashley
- Larry Atkins
- Scott Auer
- Hise Austin
- Jason Avant
- Donnie Avery
- Ken Avery

== B ==
- Mike Baab
- Billy Baber
- Jason Babin
- Allen Bailey
- Mark Bailey
- Victor Bailey
- Deandre Baker
- Jason Baker
- Jon Baker
- Gary Baldinger
- Rich Baldinger
- Johnny Baldwin
- Jon Baldwin
- Gary Barbaro
- Shawn Barber
- Bryan Barker
- Rashad Barksdale
- Tom Barndt
- Charley Barnes
- Lew Barnes
- T. J. Barnes
- Tim Barnett
- Sam Barrington
- William Bartee
- Connor Barth
- Jim Barton
- Mike Bartrum
- Jeffrey Bassa
- Jackie Bates
- Jackie Battle
- Julian Battle
- Tom Baugh
- Martin Bayless
- Pete Beathard
- Anthony Becht
- Ed Beckman
- Monty Beisel
- Randy Beisler
- Jovan Belcher
- Billy Bell
- Blake Bell
- Bobby Bell
- Kendrell Bell
- Le'Veon Bell
- Mike Bell
- Josh Bellamy
- Caesar Belser
- Jason Belser
- Horace Belton
- Kelvin Benjamin
- Donnell Bennett
- Michael Bennett
- Scott Bentley
- Bruce Bergey
- Ed Bernet
- Roger Bernhardt
- Eric Berry
- Keith Best
- Dennis Biodrowski
- J. J. Birden
- Sonny Bishop
- James Black
- Jordan Black
- Todd Blackledge
- Jeff Blackshear
- Robert Blakely
- Jerry Blanton
- Derrick Blaylock
- Curtis Bledsoe
- Matt Blundin
- Austin Blythe
- Chris Bober
- Marc Boerigter
- Rocky Boiman
- Juran Bolden
- Nick Bolton
- Steve Bono
- Vaughn Booker
- Johnny Bookman
- Alfonso Boone
- Dicaprio Bootle
- Kevin Boss
- Dwayne Bowe
- Max Boydston
- Ekow Boye-Doe
- Swayze Bozeman
- Tyron Brackenridge
- Mark Bradley
- Michael Bragg
- Mel Branch
- Tyvon Branch
- Solomon Brannan
- Tyler Bray
- Steve Breaston
- Bashaud Breeland
- Bob Briggs
- Kevin Brock
- John Brockington
- Tommy Brooker
- Bucky Brooks
- Cortez Broughton
- Aaron Brown
- Alex Brown
- Dee Brown
- Eric Brown
- Jalil Brown
- Larry Brown
- Mike Brown
- Marquise Brown
- Orlando Brown
- Theotis Brown
- John Browning
- Jason Brownlee
- Larry Brunson
- Bob Bryant
- Trent Bryant
- Buck Buchanan
- Brad Budde
- Ed Budde
- Shane Buechele
- Chris Burford
- Ted Burgmeier
- Raymond Burks
- Lloyd Burruss
- Michael Burton
- Deon Bush
- Lewis Bush
- Matt Bushman
- Harrison Butker
- Gary Butler

== C ==
- Glenn Cadrez
- John Cadwell
- Mike Caliendo
- Phil Cancik
- Billy Cannon
- Mark Cannon
- Dean Carlson
- John Carney
- Reggie Carolan
- Brandon Carr
- Paul Ott Carruth
- Carlos Carson
- Dale Carter
- M.L. Carter
- Perry Carter
- Frank Case
- Keith Cash
- Matt Cassel
- Tim Castille
- Mike Catapano
- Ronnie Caveness
- Quinton Caver
- Oliver Celestin
- Chris Chambers
- Jamaal Charles
- Orson Charles
- Taco Charlton
- Steve Cheek
- Leo Chenal
- Deron Cherry
- Jehu Chesson
- Gene Chilton
- Geron Christian
- Cole Christiansen
- Herb Christopher
- Morris Claiborne
- Bruce Clark
- Frank Clark
- Wayne Clark
- Shannon Clavelle
- Tom Clements
- Duane Clemons
- Pinball Clemons
- Mike Cloud
- Bert Coan
- Omari Cobb
- Keondre Coburn
- Jack Cochrane
- Sherman Cocroft
- Paul Coffman
- Tim Cofield
- Darrell Colbert
- Keary Colbert
- Lewis Colbert
- Ricardo Colclough
- Kurt Coleman
- Tim Collier
- Mark Collins
- Ray Collins
- Todd Collins
- Dustin Colquitt
- Jeff Colter
- Sanders Commings
- Tom Condon
- Chris Conley
- Chamarri Conner
- Scott Connot
- Bryan Cook
- Louis Cooper
- Marcus Cooper
- Danny Copeland
- Terrance Copper
- Walt Corey
- Jerry Cornelison
- Brad Cottam
- Mike Cox
- Reggie Craig
- Keith Crawford
- Jeff Criswell
- Ray Crockett
- Brodie Croyle
- Ronnie Cruz
- Curley Culp
- Baylor Cupp
- Kevin Curtis

== D ==
- Weston Dacus
- Lional Dalton
- George Daney
- Chase Daniel
- Calvin Daniels
- Clem Daniels
- Travis Daniels
- Michael Danna
- J. P. Darche
- Devard Darling
- Cotton Davidson
- Anthony Davis
- Dick Davis
- Knile Davis
- Ricky Davis
- Willie Davis
- Lake Dawson
- Len Dawson
- Mike Dawson
- Steve DeBerg
- Fred DeBernardi
- Case deBruijn
- Jack Del Rio
- Joe Delaney
- Quintin Demps
- Pat Dennis
- Jordan Devey
- Mike DeVito
- Bill Diamond
- Charley Diamond
- Matt Dickerson
- Ron Dickerson, Jr.
- Bo Dickinson
- Gehrig Dieter
- Curt DiGiacomo
- Patrick DiMarco
- Tony DiMidio
- Tom Dimmick
- Johnnie Dirden
- Cris Dishman
- Al Dixon
- Ernest Dixon
- Ronnie Dixon
- Tom Dohring
- Paul Dombroski
- Jeff Donaldson
- Rick Donnalley
- Glenn Dorsey
- Larry Dorsey
- Al Dotson
- Dan Doubiago
- Eric Downing
- Ethan Downs
- Cornelius Dozier
- Shaun Draughn
- Troy Drayton
- Chris Dressel
- Doug Dressler
- Ethan Driskell
- Tom Drougas
- Eddie Drummond
- Troy Dumas
- Randy Duncan
- Carlos Dunlap
- Jason Dunn
- Yasir Durant
- Laurent Duvernay-Tardif
- Mike Dyal

== E ==
- Nate Eachus
- Omar Easy
- Irv Eatman
- Donnie Edwards
- Mike Edwards
- Ron Edwards
- Clyde Edwards-Helaire
- Parker Ehinger
- Abram Elam
- Ukeme Eligwe
- Mike Elkins
- Lin Elliott
- Alex Ellis
- Willie Ellison
- Jimbo Elrod
- Bobby Engram
- Hunter Enis
- Jack Epps
- Cameron Erving
- Alex Espinoza
- Richard Estell
- Larry Estes
- James Evans
- Mike Evans
- Eric Everett

== F ==
- Rob Fada
- Neil Farrell Jr.
- Curt Farrier
- Anthony Fasano
- Jeff Faulkner
- Greg Favors
- Gerry Feehery
- Rashad Fenton
- Jaime Fields
- Jitter Fields
- Clint Finley
- Anthony Firkser
- Eric Fisher
- Jamell Fleming
- Tom Flores
- Brandon Flowers
- Don Flynn
- Nick Foles
- Dee Ford
- Jody Fortson
- J. P. Foschi
- Daurice Fountain
- Sid Fournet
- Keyaron Fox
- Jerry Franklin
- William Franklin
- Jim Fraser
- Cliff Frazier
- Randy Frazier
- Wayne Frazier
- Willie Frazier
- Eddie Freeman
- Dick Frey
- Elliott Fry
- Scott Fujita
- Kendall Fuller
- Steve Fuller
- Kristian Fulton
- Zach Fulton

== G ==
- Blaine Gabbert
- Thomas Gafford
- Bob Gagliano
- Larry Gagner
- Clark Gaines
- Phillip Gaines
- Jared Gaither
- Dion Gales
- Kenny Gamble
- Kendall Gammon
- Rich Gannon
- Earl Gant
- Bubba Garcia
- Ellis Gardner
- Rod Gardner
- Mike Garrett
- Curtis Gatewood
- Steve Gaunty
- Matt Gay
- Willie Gay
- Jack Gehrke
- Ron George
- Charlie Getty
- Lee Getz
- Wallace Gilberry
- Jon Gilliam
- Ashton Gillotte
- Chukwuebuka Godrick
- Mike Goff
- Chris Golub
- Tony Gonzalez
- Kelly Goodburn
- Amon Gordon
- Josh Gordon
- Richard Gordon
- Derrick Gore
- Jeff Gossett
- Derrick Graham
- Tom Graham
- Rufus Granderson
- Carlton Gray
- Cyrus Gray
- Noah Gray
- Quinn Gray
- Tim Gray
- Dave Grayson
- Elvis Grbac
- Boyce Green
- Gary Green
- Trent Green
- Woody Green
- Ted Greene
- Tom Greene
- Tracy Greene
- Cory Greenwood
- Kelly Gregg
- Kris Griffin
- Leonard Griffin
- Stephen Griffin
- Nakia Griffin-Stewart
- Boomer Grigsby
- Monty Grow
- Ben Grubbs
- Tim Grunhard
- Bob Grupp
- Mike Gunter
- Matt Gutierrez

== H ==
- Dino Hackett
- David Hadley
- James Hadnot
- Marques Hagans
- Saalim Hakim
- Tamba Hali
- Carlos Hall
- Chad Hall
- Dante Hall
- Andy Hamilton
- Antonio Hamilton
- Justin Hamilton
- Rick Hamilton
- Bob Hamm
- Frankie Hammond
- James Hamrick
- Anthony Hancock
- C. J. Hanson
- Dee Hardison
- Mecole Hardman
- Tony Hargain
- James Harrell
- Bob Harris
- Corey Harris
- Darius Harris
- Demetrius Harris
- Demone Harris
- Eric Harris
- Gilbert Harris
- Jimmy Harris
- Michael Harris
- Napoleon Harris
- Nate Harris
- Ryan Harris
- Glynn Harrison
- Emile Harry
- Tysyn Hartman
- Shaunard Harts
- James Harvey
- Marvin Harvey
- Stacy Harvey
- Wilbert Haslip
- James Hasty
- Andy Hawkins
- Jonathan Hayes
- Wendell Hayes
- Abner Haynes
- Louis Haynes
- Sherrill Headrick
- Herman Heard
- Darius Helton
- Junior Hemingway
- Peyton Hendershot
- Chad Henne
- Matt Herkenhoff
- Malik Herring
- David Herron
- Eric Hicks
- Jaden Hicks
- Kerry Hicks
- Sylvester Hicks
- Dave Hill
- Greg Hill (born 1961)
- Greg Hill (born 1972)
- Jimmy Hill
- Kenny Hill
- Mack Lee Hill
- Tyreek Hill
- Peyton Hillis
- Jim Hines
- Anthony Hitchens
- Nate Hobgood-Chittick
- Russ Hochstein
- Eric Hodges
- Jimmy Holiday
- Darius Holland
- Eric Holle
- Vonnie Holliday
- David Hollis
- Tony Holloway
- Bruce Holmes
- Pat Holmes
- Priest Holmes
- Robert Holmes
- Pete Holohan
- Mike Holston
- E. J. Holub
- Dennis Homan
- DeAndre Hopkins
- Doug Hoppock
- Chris Horn
- Joe Horn
- Jeremy Horne
- Ethan Horton
- Bobby Houston
- Justin Houston
- Jaye Howard
- Thomas Howard, Sr.
- Todd Howard
- Braxton Hoyett
- Damon Huard
- John Huarte
- Mike Hudock
- Bob Hudson
- Doug Hudson
- Rodney Hudson
- Danan Hughes
- Mike Hughes
- Bill Hull
- Creed Humphrey
- Tommy Humphrey
- D. J. Humphries
- Akeem Hunt
- Bobby Hunt
- Kareem Hunt
- Ryan Hunter
- Chuck Hurston
- Michael Husted
- Glenn Hyde
- Paul Hynes

== I ==
- Byron Ingram
- Johnathan Ingram
- Keaontay Ingram
- Melvin Ingram
- Danny Isidora
- Joey Ivie

== J ==
- Billy Jackson
- Charles Jackson
- Charlie Jackson
- Frank Jackson
- Gerald Jackson
- Josh Jackson
- T. J. Jackson
- Tyson Jackson
- Mitch Jacoby
- Van Jakes
- Richie James
- Robert James
- George Jamison
- Bruce Jankowski
- Ron Jaworski
- David Jaynes
- A. J. Jenkins
- Jarvis Jenkins
- Keyvan Jenkins
- Trezelle Jenkins
- Luther Jeralds
- Clyde Johnson
- Curley Johnson
- Darrius Johnson
- Derrick Johnson
- Dick Johnson
- Jack Johnson
- James-Michael Johnson
- Jimmie Johnson
- Ken Johnson
- Larry Johnson
- Lonnie Johnson
- Melvin Johnson
- Nazeeh Johnson
- Nico Johnson
- Reggie Johnson
- Rishaw Johnson
- Sidney Johnson
- Stan Johnson
- Brian Johnston
- Ken Jolly
- Adrian Jones
- Bill Jones
- Cam Jones
- Chris Jones
- Dominique Jones
- Doug Jones
- E. J. Jones
- Edgar Jones
- Fred Jones (born 1965)
- Fred Jones (born 1967)
- Fred Jones (born 1977)
- Hassan Jones
- Nic Jones
- Rod Jones
- Ronald Jones II
- Thomas Jones
- Victor Jones
- Willie Jones
- Akeem Jordan
- Brian Jozwiak
- Jarmar Julien
- Mike Junkin

== K ==
- Joshua Kaindoh
- Jason Kaiser
- George Karlaftis III
- Kani Kauahi
- Jim Kearney
- Tim Kearney
- Tom Keating
- Mark Keel
- Bryan Kehl
- Nick Keizer
- Travis Kelce
- Bill Kellar
- Edward Kelley
- Bob Kelly
- Marcus Kemp
- Bill Kenney
- Eddie Kennison
- William Kershaw
- Leroy Keyes
- Thakarius Keyes
- Daniel Kilgore
- Bruce King
- David King
- Darian Kinnard
- Jeff Kinney
- Kelly Kirchbaum
- Mark Kirchner
- Dave Klug
- Lindsay Knapp
- Sammy Knight
- Kevin Knowles
- Pete Koch
- Stein Koss
- Tanoh Kpassagnon
- Greg Kragen
- Dan Kratzer
- Ken Kremer
- Dave Krieg
- Bill Krisher
- Eric Kush

== L ==
- Sean LaChapelle
- Ken Lacy
- Ernie Ladd
- Morris LaGrand
- Chris Lammons
- Garcia Lane
- MacArthur Lane
- Skip Lane
- Reshard Langford
- Willie Lanier
- Carl Larpenter
- Kit Lathrop
- Ty Law
- Quinten Lawrence
- Darron Lee
- Elijah Lee
- Jacky Lee
- Willie Lee
- Maurice Leggett
- Albert Lewis
- Garry Lewis
- Kendrick Lewis
- Tahaun Lewis
- Bob Liggett
- Ryan Lilja
- Chris Lindstrom
- Dave Lindstrom
- Adam Lingner
- Jeff Linkenbach
- David Little
- Mike Livingston
- Jeff Lloyd
- Kevin Lockett
- Bennie Logan
- John Lohmeyer
- Derek Lokey
- Khari Long
- Lance Long
- Sam Longmire
- Ed Lothamer
- Kyle Love
- Calvin Loveall
- Paul Lowe
- Nick Lowery
- Jordan Lucas
- Dave Lutz
- Blake Lynch
- Jim Lynch

== M ==
- Bill Maas
- Cedric Mack
- David Macklin
- Jeremy Maclin
- John Maczuzak
- Bob Maddox
- Alex Magee
- Patrick Mahomes
- Darrell Malone
- Pete Mandley
- Steve Maneri
- Dino Mangiero
- Frank Manumaleuga
- Greg Manusky
- Justin March
- Jim Marsalis
- Henry Marshall
- Larry Marshall
- Chris Martin
- Dave Martin
- Don Martin
- Eric Martin
- Josh Martin
- Steve Martin
- Lonnie Marts
- Mike Maslowski
- Billy Masters
- Tyrann Mathieu
- Bryan Mattison
- John Matuszak
- Josh Mauga
- Marcus Maxey
- Corey Mays
- Jerry Mays
- Joe Mays
- Ken McAlister
- Turk McBride
- Jerry McCabe
- Jim McCann
- Mickey McCarty
- Le'Ron McClain
- Terrell McClain
- Norris McCleary
- Dexter McCleon
- Curtis McClinton
- Dexter McCluster
- LeSean McCoy
- Kelcie McCray
- Pellom McDaniels
- Cooper McDonald
- Bradley McDougald
- Trent McDuffie
- Reggie McElroy
- Chester McGlockton
- Mike McGlynn
- Rob McGovern
- Sean McGrath
- Jon McGraw
- Damion McIntosh
- Odis McKinney
- Jerick McKinnon
- Joe McKnight
- Ted McKnight
- Ron McLean
- Erik McMillan
- Mark McMillian
- Todd McNair
- Pat McNeil
- Leon McQuay III
- Jerrold McRae
- Warren McVea
- Justin Medlock
- Greg Meisner
- Mike Mercer
- Curt Merz
- Jerry Meyers
- Darren Mickell
- Bill Miller
- Cleo Miller
- Paul Miller
- Roy Miller
- Ray Milo
- Charles Mincy
- Snoop Minnis
- Gardner Minshew
- Elijah Mitchell
- Kawika Mitchell
- Terrance Mitchell
- Willie Mitchell
- Tony Moeaki
- Dave Montagne
- Joe Montana
- Warren Moon
- Jaylon Moore
- Matt Moore
- Skyy Moore
- Mo Moorman
- Frank Moreau
- Arnold Morgado
- DaJuan Morgan
- Larry Moriarty
- Bam Morris
- Donnie Joe Morris
- Mike Morris
- Sylvester Morris
- Wanya Morris
- Mitch Morse
- Johnnie Morton
- Rick Moser
- Dezman Moses
- Gary Moten
- Lloyd Mumphrey
- Daniel Munyer
- James Murphy
- Montez Murphy
- Nick Murphy
- Eddie Murray
- Eric Murray
- Jimmy Murray

== N ==
- Walter Napier
- Kenny Nash
- Ikechuku Ndukwe
- Mark Nelson
- Steven Nelson
- Teddy Nelson
- Jamar Newsome
- Tony Newson
- Tim Newton
- Lucas Niang
- Jim Nicholson
- Dadi Nicolas
- Ben Niemann
- Rudy Niswanger
- Doyle Nix
- Derrick Nnadi
- Omarr Norman-Lott
- Mike Nott
- Dexter Nottage
- Hunter Nourzad
- Nick Novak
- Rakeem Nunez-Roches
- R.B. Nunnery

== O ==
- Brad Oates
- Ryan O'Callaghan
- Jake O'Connell
- Dorian O'Daniel
- Ricky Odom
- Emmanuel Ogbah
- Alex Okafor
- Christian Okoye
- Chris Oladokun
- Bob Olderman
- John Olenchalk
- Muhammad Oliver
- Orrin Olsen
- Patrick Omameh
- Charles Omenihu
- Andre O'Neal
- Leslie O'Neal
- Nate Orchard
- Mike Oriard
- Kyle Orton
- Kelechi Osemele
- James O'Shaughnessy
- Sandy Osiecki
- Willie Osley
- Jim Otis
- Chris Owens
- Rich Owens

== P ==
- Isiah Pacheco
- Jarrad Page
- Stephone Paige
- Jeff Paine
- Al Palewicz
- Tyler Palko
- Gery Palmer
- Paul Palmer
- Anthony Parker
- Brian Parker
- Glenn Parker
- Kerry Parker
- Larry Parker
- Robert Parker
- Ron Parker
- Samie Parker
- Don Parrish
- Ty Parten
- Dimitri Patterson
- Marvcus Patton
- Whitney Paul
- Eddie Payton
- Aaron Pearson
- Barry Pearson
- J. C. Pearson
- Francis Peay
- Steve Pelluer
- Chris Penn
- Mike Pennel
- Tom Pennington
- La'Mical Perine
- Samaje Perine
- Horace Perkins
- Brett Perriman
- Ed Perry
- Michael Dean Perry
- Marcus Peters
- Bill Peterson
- Cal Peterson
- Todd Peterson
- Stan Petry
- Joe Phillips
- Bruce Pickens
- Zacch Pickens
- Dameon Pierce
- Kevin Pierre-Louis
- Jim Pietrzak
- Willie Pile
- Woodie Pippens
- Sabby Piscitelli
- Ropati Pitoitua
- Frank Pitts
- Bobby Ply
- Ed Podolak
- Dontari Poe
- Esa Pole
- Bernard Pollard
- Daniel Pope
- Leonard Pope
- Ted Popson
- Kevin Porter
- Lew Porter
- Steve Potter
- Jerrell Powe
- Cornell Powell
- Clyde Powers
- Dean Prater
- Ricky Price
- Billy Pricer
- Deneric Prince
- Byron Pringle
- Bryan Proby
- Remi Prudhomme
- Mike Pruitt
- Jarrod Pughsley
- Alfred Pupunu

== Q ==
- Brady Quinn
- Jonathan Quinn

== R ==
- Scott Radecic
- Reggie Ragland
- Ervin Randle
- Martinas Rankin
- Derrick Ransom
- Rocky Rasley
- Dave Rayner
- Tommy Reamon
- Kerry Reardon
- Keith Reaser
- James Reed
- Jarran Reed
- Tony Reed
- Allen Reese
- Jerry Reese
- Jacques Reeves
- Jah Reid
- Justin Reid
- Austin Reiter
- Nikko Remigio
- Mike Remmers
- Darrelle Revis
- Kendall Reyes
- Al Reynolds
- Andy Rice
- Rashee Rice
- Barry Richardson
- Gloster Richardson
- Mike Richardson
- Tony Richardson
- Tom Ricketts
- Lawrence Ricks
- Mikhael Ricks
- Victor Riley
- Andre Rison
- Willie Roaf
- Alfredo Roberts
- Demarcus Robinson
- Dunta Robinson
- Johnny Robinson
- Kevin Robinson
- Mark Robinson
- Brian Roche
- Paul Rochester
- Justin Rogers (linebacker)
- Steve Rogers
- Tracy Rogers
- Christian Roland-Wallace
- Stan Rome
- Tony Romeo
- Durwood Roquemore
- Hatch Rosdahl
- Donovan Rose
- Derrick Ross
- Justyn Ross
- Kevin Ross
- Louis Ross
- Jim Rourke
- Stanford Routt
- Jalen Royals
- Christian Rozeboom
- Dave Rozumek
- Jack Rudnay
- Bob Rush
- Sean Ryan

== S ==
- Troy Sadowski
- Dan Saleaumua
- Jerome Sally
- Kevin Sampson
- B. J. Sams
- Tony Samuels
- Clarence Sanders
- Cairo Santos
- Benny Sapp
- Todd Sauerbrun
- Khalen Saunders
- Dantrell Savage
- James Saxon
- Jimmy Saxton
- Orlando Scandrick
- Rich Scanlon
- Geoff Schwartz
- Mitchell Schwartz
- Todd Scott
- Willie Scott
- George Seals
- Ricky Seals-Jones
- Goldie Sellers
- Mike Sensibaugh
- Frank Seurer
- Montique Sharpe
- Josh Shaw
- Cameron Sheffield
- Rashaan Shehee
- Danny Shelton
- Anthony Sherman
- Billy Shields
- Will Shields
- George Shorthose
- Spencer Shrader
- Junior Siavii
- Ricky Siglar
- Brandon Siler
- Tracy Simien
- Bob Simmons
- Josh Simmons
- Wayne Simmons
- Mark Simoneau
- Keith Simons
- Ryan Sims
- Tom Sims
- Bobby Sippio
- Webster Slaughter
- Alex Smith
- Brashard Smith
- Chris Smith
- Dave Smith
- Donovan Smith
- Emmanuel Smith
- Eric Smith
- Fletcher Smith
- Franky Smith
- J. T. Smith
- Jeff Smith (born 1962)
- Jeff Smith (born 1973)
- Kenny Smith
- Khreem Smith
- Kolby Smith
- Lucious Smith
- Michael Smith
- Neil Smith
- Noland Smith
- Richard Smith
- Sean Smith
- Shaun Smith
- Sid Smith
- Terrance Smith
- Tremon Smith
- Trey Smith
- Wade Smith
- Ihmir Smith-Marsette
- JuJu Smith-Schuster
- L'Jarius Sneed
- Angelo Snipes
- Percy Snow
- Daniel Sorensen
- Gary Spani
- Gary Spann
- Breeland Speaks
- Marcus Spears
- Jack Spikes
- C. J. Spiller
- Tre Stallings
- Taylor Stallworth
- Frank Stams
- Tony Stargell
- Joe Staysniak
- Troy Stedman
- Carson Steele
- Bob Stein
- Al Steinfeld
- Jan Stenerud
- Mike Stensrud
- Hal Stephens
- John Stephens
- Santo Stephens
- Donald Stephenson
- Matt Stevens
- Art Still
- Gary Stills
- Ralph Stockemer
- Jack Stone
- Bill Story
- Smokey Stover
- Tommie Stowers
- Pete Stoyanovich
- John Strada
- Troy Stradford
- Morris Stroud
- Dan Stryzinski
- Les Studdard
- Andy Studebaker
- Kingsley Suamataia
- Ryan Succop
- Terrell Suggs
- Kent Sullivan
- Phillip Supernaw
- Patrick Surtain
- Will Svitek
- Jim Swink
- Pat Swoopes
- Dave Szott

== T ==
- John Tait
- Ralph Tamm
- Willy Tate
- Herb Taylor
- Jawaan Taylor
- Jay Taylor
- Keith Taylor
- Kitrick Taylor
- Otis Taylor
- Roger Taylor
- Steve Taylor
- Marvin Terrell
- Steven Terrell
- Chris Terry
- Doug Terry
- Tyler Thigpen
- Bill Thomas
- Cam Thomas
- Cameron Thomas
- Carlton Thomas
- Charlie Thomas
- Chris Thomas
- De'Anthony Thomas
- Derrick Thomas
- Emmitt Thomas
- Gene Thomas
- Jewerl Thomas
- Ken Thomas
- Pat Thomas
- Robb Thomas
- Todd Thomas
- Arland Thompson
- Bennie Thompson
- B. J. Thompson
- Darwin Thompson
- Del Thompson
- Ernie Thompson
- Leroy Thompson
- Tedric Thompson
- Bob Thornbladh
- Juan Thornhill
- Tyquan Thornton
- Don Thorp
- Neiko Thorpe
- Joe Thuney
- Jerry Tillery
- Billy Joe Tolliver
- Kadarius Toney
- Reggie Tongue
- Robert Tonyan
- Anthony Toribio
- Johnny Townsend
- Tommy Townsend
- John Trahan
- Drue Tranquill
- Ross Travis
- Keith Traylor
- Gene Trosch
- R-Kal Truluck
- Verran Tucker
- Marlon Tuipulotu
- Kyle Turley
- Tank Tyler
- Lawrence Tynes
- Jim Tyrer

== U ==
- Josh Uche
- Marvin Upshaw
- Jerheme Urban

== V ==
- Marquez Valdes-Scantling
- Joe Valerio
- Tamarick Vanover
- Jon Vaughn
- Kevin Vickerson
- Danny Villa
- Mark Vlasic
- Mike Vrabel

== W ==
- Bobby Wade
- Charlie Wade
- Erik Walden
- Rob Waldrop
- Bracy Walker
- Derrick Walker
- James Walker
- John Walker
- Vance Walker
- Wayne Walker
- Steve Wallace
- Lenny Walls
- Pierre Walters
- Rod Walters
- Riley Walton
- Wayne Walton
- Prince Tega Wanogho
- Charvarius Ward
- LaShaun Ward
- Tim Ward
- Spencer Ware
- Eric Warfield
- Charley Warner
- Brian Washington
- Charles Washington
- DeAndre Washington
- Dewayne Washington
- Donald Washington
- Montrell Washington
- Tavares Washington
- Tim Washington
- Brian Waters
- Rokevious Watkins
- Sammy Watkins
- Jaylen Watson
- Justin Watson
- Tim Watson
- Armani Watts
- Steve Weatherford
- Clarence Weathers
- Jeff Webb
- Dave Webster
- Mike Webster
- John Welbourn
- Carson Wentz
- Clyde Werner
- Greg Wesley
- Ricky Wesson
- Charcandrick West
- Lyle West
- Robert West
- Ron Wetzel
- Tershawn Wharton
- Danta Whitaker
- D. J. White
- Walter White
- William White
- David Whitmore
- Tom Wickert
- Casey Wiegmann
- Jared Wiley
- Jimmy Wilkerson
- Jerrott Willard
- Brandon Williams
- Brett Williams
- Damien Williams
- Dan Williams
- Darrel Williams
- Demorrio Williams
- Harvey Williams
- Javarris Williams
- Jermaine Williams
- Jerrol Williams
- Joshua Williams
- Kyle Williams
- Lawrence Williams
- Leon Williams
- Mike Williams
- Nick Williams
- Nohl Williams
- Robert Williams (born 1962)
- Robert Williams (born 1977)
- Sammy Williams
- Steve Williams
- Tyrone Williams
- Xavier Williams
- Fred Williamson
- Donald Willis
- Albert Wilson
- Damien Wilson
- Eddie Wilson
- Jerrel Wilson
- Kris Wilson
- Mike Wilson
- Ramik Wilson
- James Winchester
- Eric Winston
- Frank Winters
- Stefen Wisniewski
- Bryan Witzmann
- Jim Wolf
- Duane Wood
- Ray Woodard
- Terry Wooden
- Jerome Woods
- Barry Word
- Mark Word
- Naz Worthen
- Xavier Worthy
- Elmo Wright
- Felix Wright
- Matthew Wright
- Kevin Wyatt
- Andrew Wylie
- Devon Wylie

== Y ==
- Ray Yakavonis
- Deon Yelder
- Mike Young
- Wilbur Young

== Z ==
- John Zamberlin
- Carroll Zaruba
- Frank Zombo
