= 1987 Kansas City Chiefs season =

NFL team season

- Owner: Lamar Hunt
- General manager: Jim Schaaf
- Head coach: Frank Gansz
- Home stadium: Arrowhead Stadium

Results
- Record: 4–11
- Division place: 5th AFC West
- Playoffs: Did not qualify
- All-Pros: None
- Pro Bowlers: 4: WR Carlos Carson; DT Bill Maas; CB Albert Lewis; S Deron Cherry

The 1987 Kansas City Chiefs season was the franchise's 18th season in the National Football League and the 28th overall. Under new head coach Frank Gansz, the Chiefs split their first two games, 1-1. The 1987 NFL season featured games predominantly played by replacement players, as the National Football League Players Association (NFLPA) players went on strike from weeks four to six with week three being cancelled across the league. The replacement players went 0–3. After the regulars returned, the Chiefs continued to struggle. They lost their next five games to stand at 1–9 and finished the season with a 4–11 record a year after making the playoffs in 1986.

== Offseason ==
One of the most tumultuous weeks in franchise history took place following the club's playoff loss against the Jets in the 1986 playoffs. Assistant head coach and special teams coach Frank Gansz, resigned his position on January 7 in order to pursue opportunities as an NFL offensive coordinator. The following day, the Chiefs announced in an impromptu press conference that John Mackovic was relieved of his duties as head coach on January 8. A popular figure among Chiefs players, Gansz was reinstated on January 10 and was named the sixth head coach in franchise history.

Former quarterback Len Dawson became the third Chiefs player inducted into the Pro Football Hall of Fame on August 8, while injuries forced the retirement of the club's all-time leading tackler Gary Spani.

=== NFL draft ===
1987 Kansas City Chiefs draft
Round	Pick	Player	Position	College	Notes
1	19	Paul Palmer	Running back	Temple	
2	35	Christian Okoye *	Fullback	Azusa Pacific	
3	73	Todd Howard	Linebacker	Texas A&M	
5	128	Kitrick Taylor	Wide receiver	Washington State	
7	186	Doug Hudson	Quarterback	Nicholls State	
8	218	Michael Clemons	Running back	William & Mary	
9	244	Randy Watts	Defensive end	Catawba	
10	271	James Evans	Running back	Southern	
11	298	Craig Richardson	Wide receiver	Eastern Washington	
12	325	Bruce Holmes	Linebacker	Minnesota	
Made roster * Made at least one Pro Bowl during career

== Personnel ==
=== Staff ===
1987 Kansas City Chiefs staff
Front office: Founder – Lamar Hunt; President – Jack Steadman; Vice president/general manager – Jim Schaaf; Director of pro personnel – Whitey Dovell; Director of college scouting – Les Miller; Coordinator of college scouting – Greg Mohns; Head coaches: Head coach – Frank Gansz; Offensive coaches: Offensive coordinator/quarterbacks – Homer Smith; Running backs – Billie Matthews; Wide receivers – Dick Wood; Offensive line – Carl Mauck; Offensive quality control/tight ends – JD Helm	Defensive coaches: Defensive coordinator/linebackers – John Paul Young; Defensive line – Don Lawrence; Defensive backs – Dave Brazil; Defensive quality control/linebackers – Mark Hatley; Special teams coaches: Special teams – Ed Beckman; Strength and conditioning: Strength and conditioning coordinator – CT Hewgley

=== Replacement players ===
After the league decided to use replacement players during the NFLPA strike, the following team was assembled:

1987 Kansas City Chiefs replacement roster
Quarterbacks: 1 Matt Stevens; 11 Doug Hudson; 11 Sandy Osiecki; 12 Alex Espinoza; Running backs: 21 Ralph Stockemer; 39 Steve Griffin; 40 Ken Lacy; 41 Woodie Pippens; 42 Lloyd Murray; 43 Robert Parker; 47 Chris Smith; Wide receivers: 82 Nate Blanks; 83 John Trahan; 84 Richard Estell; 85 Kenny Nash; 86 Eric Brown; 87 David Montagne; 89 Eric Hodges; Tight ends: 80 Stein Koss; 81 Rod Jones; 88 Riley Walton	Offensive linemen: 52 John Aimonetti; 58 Arland Thompson; 62 James Boyd; 64 James Harvey; 65 Kevin Adkins; 66 Dan Doubiago; 70 Mark Nelson; 71 Lee Getz; 77 Steve Rogers; 79 Doug Hoppock; Defensive linemen: 60 Chris Lindstrom; 68 Terry Summers; 69 James Black; 90 Jeff Faulkner; 91 Lloyd Mumphrey; 92 Keith Guthrie; 98 John Walker	Linebackers: 50 Gary Moten; 92 Bob Harris; 57 Bruce Holmes; 94 Gary Spann; 95 Randy Frazier; 96 Fred Jones; 97 Tony Holloway; Defensive backs: 23 Kevin Wyatt; 25 Jack Epps; 26 Cornelius Dozier; 27 Blane Smith; 38 Carlton Thomas; 40 Jitter Fields; 41 Chris Evans; 45 Trent Bryant; 48 Jeff Colter; 48 Garcia Lane; 49 Teddy Nelson; Special teams: 2 Kelly Goodburn P; 3 Paul Woodside K; 4 James Hamrick K

=== Final roster ===
1987 Kansas City Chiefs roster
Quarterbacks (QB): 14 Todd Blackledge; 11 Doug Hudson; 9 Bill Kenney; 10 Frank Seurer; Running backs (RB): 46 Michael Clemons; 44 Herman Heard; 32 Larry Moriarty; 35 Christian Okoye FB; 26 Paul Palmer; Wide receivers (WR): 88 Carlos Carson; 81 Darrell Colbert; 89 Henry Marshall; 83 Stephone Paige; Tight ends (TE): 84 Paul Coffman; 85 Jonathan Hayes; 80 Mark Keel	Offensive linemen (OL): 61 Mark Adickes G; 77 Rich Baldinger G; 58 Tom Baugh C; 51 Rick Donnalley C; 75 Irv Eatman T; 52 Glenn Hyde C; 60 Byron Ingram G; 73 Brian Jozwiak G; 72 Dave Lutz T; Defensive linemen (DL): 91 Gary Baldinger DT; 99 Mike Bell DE; 98 Leonard Griffin DT; 63 Bill Maas DT; 67 Art Still DE; 70 Ray Woodard DE	Linebackers (LB): 54 Tim Cofield OLB; 55 Louis Cooper OLB; 50 Jack Del Rio OLB; 56 Dino Hackett MLB; 57 James Harrell MLB; 53 Todd Howard MLB; 96 Aaron Pearson OLB; 52 Angelo Snipes OLB; Defensive backs (DB): 20 Deron Cherry FS; 22 Sherman Cocroft FS; 40 Jitter Fields CB; 23 Greg Hill CB; 48 Garcia Lane CB; 29 Albert Lewis CB; 24 J. C. Pearson CB; 30 Mark Robinson SS; 31 Kevin Ross CB; Special teams (ST): 2 Kelly Goodburn P; 8 Nick Lowery K	Reserve: 76 John Alt T (IR); 87 Walt Arnold TE (IR); 69 James Black DE (IR); 34 Lloyd Burruss S (IR); 5 Lewis Colbert P (IR); 86 Emile Harry WR (IR); 93 Eric Holle DT (IR); 45 Sidney Johnson CB (IR); 74 Pete Koch DT (IR); 94 Ken McAlister LB (IR); -- Gary Spann LB (IR); 82 Kitrick Taylor WR (IR); Rookies in italics

== Season summary ==
A duo of rookies made a splash in a 20–13 win on Opening Day against San Diego as running back Paul Palmer returned a kickoff for a TD and Christian Okoye dashed for 105 yards. A 24-day players strike began on September 22, canceling the club's contest against Minnesota. Replacement players participated in games for the next three weeks. Much like Marv Levy five years earlier, Gansz's grip on the club's coaching reins was crippled by the labor unrest.

Kansas City's replacement squad consisted primarily of players cut in training camp. One of the few bright spots among the players was running back Jitter Fields, who remained on the active roster following the strike. The Chiefs strike squad received an ominous welcome in Los Angeles when in the early morning hours of October 4, the day prior to a contest against the Raiders, an earthquake rattled Southern California. The shaken Chiefs lost a 35–17 decision later that day. The low point of the year came the following week at Miami in the first regular season game played at what then was known as Joe Robbie Stadium. Chiefs replacement QB Matt Stevens was injured early in the contest, forcing into duty backup quarterback Alex Espinoza, who had never taken an NFL snap. The result was a 42–0 Dolphins victory, setting the stage for an 0–3 performance by Kansas City's replacement unit, giving the Chiefs a 1–4 record before the club's regular roster returned at San Diego on October 25. Five straight losses followed, giving the Chiefs a team-record nine-game losing skid. For the only time in team history, five different players started games at quarterback for the club. Behind Kenney, Kansas City won two of its last three games to conclude the strike-shortened 4–11 campaign.

== Preseason ==
Week	Date	Opponent	Result	Record	Venue	Attendance	Recap
HOF	August 8	vs. San Francisco 49ers	L 7–20	0–1	Fawcett Stadium (Canton, Ohio)	23,826	Recap
1	August 13	at Houston Oilers	W 32–20	1–1	Houston Astrodome	30,147	Recap
2	August 22	Atlanta Falcons	W 13–10	2–1	Arrowhead Stadium	39,164	Recap
3	August 29	Buffalo Bills	W 34–14	3–1	Arrowhead Stadium	43,887	Recap
4	September 6	vs. St. Louis Cardinals	W 13–10 (OT)	4–1	Liberty Bowl (Memphis, TN)	62,353	Recap

== Regular season ==
=== Schedule ===
Week	Date	Opponent	Result	Record	Venue	Attendance	Recap
1	September 13	**San Diego Chargers**	**W** 20–13	1–0	Arrowhead Stadium	56,940	Recap
2	September 20	at **Seattle Seahawks**	**L** 14–43	1–1	Kingdome	61,667	Recap
3	September 27	Minnesota Vikings	Cancelled due to players' strike				
4	October 4	at **Los Angeles Raiders**	**L** 17–35	1–2	Los Angeles Memorial Coliseum	10,708	Recap
5	October 11	at Miami Dolphins	**L** 0–42	1–3	Joe Robbie Stadium	25,867	Recap
6	October 18	**Denver Broncos**	**L** 17–26	1–4	Arrowhead Stadium	20,296	Recap
7	October 25	at **San Diego Chargers**	**L** 21–42	1–5	Jack Murphy Stadium	47,972	Recap
8	November 1	at Chicago Bears	**L** 28–31	1–6	Soldier Field	63,498	Recap
9	November 8	Pittsburgh Steelers	**L** 16–17	1–7	Arrowhead Stadium	45,249	Recap
10	November 15	New York Jets	**L** 9–16	1–8	Arrowhead Stadium	40,718	Recap
11	November 22	Green Bay Packers	**L** 3–23	1–9	Arrowhead Stadium	34,611	Recap
12	November 26	at Detroit Lions	**W** 27–20	2–9	Pontiac Silverdome	43,820	Recap
13	December 6	at Cincinnati Bengals	**L** 27–30 (OT)	2–10	Riverfront Stadium	46,489	Recap
14	December 13	**Los Angeles Raiders**	**W** 16–10	3–10	Arrowhead Stadium	63,834	Recap
15	December 19	at **Denver Broncos**	**L** 17–20	3–11	Mile High Stadium	75,053	Recap
16	December 27	**Seattle Seahawks**	**W** 41–20	4–11	Arrowhead Stadium	20,370	Recap
Note: Intra-division opponents are in **bold** text.

=== Game summaries ===
==== Week 1: vs. San Diego Chargers ====
Week 1: San Diego Chargers at Kansas City Chiefs – Game summary

Quarter	1	2	3	4	Total
Chargers	0	0	3	10	**13**
**Chiefs**	3	7	0	10	**20**

at Arrowhead Stadium, Kansas City, Missouri

- Date: September 13
- Game time: 12:00 p.m. CDT
- Game weather: Sunny, 74 °F (23 °C)
- Game attendance: 56,940
- Referee: Pat Haggerty
- TV announcers (NBC): Gary Gerould and Sam Rutigliano
- Recap, Game Book

Game information

**First quarter**

- KC – Nick Lowery 25-yard field goal, 1:23. Chiefs 3–0. **Drive: 12 plays, 46 yards, 6:10.**

**Second quarter**

- KC – Christian Okoye 45-yard run (Nick Lowery kick), 2:56. Chiefs 10–0. **Drive: 6 plays, 80 yards, 3:14.**

**Third quarter**

- SD – Vince Abbott 32-yard field goal, 7:47. Chiefs 10–3. **Drive: 14 plays, 72 yards, 7:13.**

**Fourth quarter**

- KC – Nick Lowery 29-yard field goal, 12:45. Chiefs 13–3. **Drive: 12 plays, 63 yards, 5:48.**
- SD – Gary Anderson 34-yard pass from Dan Fouts (Vince Abbott kick), 7:37. Chiefs 13–10. **Drive: 6 plays, 77 yards, 1:35.**
- SD – Vince Abbott 33-yard field goal, 3:37. Tie 13–13. **Drive: 7 plays, 15 yards, 2:57.**
- KC – Paul Palmer 85-yard kickoff return (Nick Lowery kick), 3:19. Chiefs 20–13.

**Top passers**

- SD – Dan Fouts – 21/39, 270 yards, TD, 2 INT
- KC – Todd Blackledge – 6/15, 79 yards, INT

**Top rushers**

- SD – Gary Anderson – 12 rushes, 43 yards
- KC – Christian Okoye – 21 rushes, 105 yards, TD

**Top receivers**

- SD – Lionel James – 6 receptions, 100 yards
- KC – Stephone Paige – 2 receptions, 29 yards

==== Week 2: at Seattle Seahawks ====
Week 2: Kansas City Chiefs at Seattle Seahawks – Game summary

Quarter	1	2	3	4	Total
Chiefs	0	7	0	7	**14**
**Seahawks**	3	14	20	6	**43**

at Kingdome, Seattle, Washington

- Date: September 20
- Game time: 3:00 p.m. CDT/1:00 p.m. PDT
- Game weather: None (indoor stadium)
- Game attendance: 61,667
- Referee: Fred Silva
- TV announcers (NBC): Dick Enberg and Merlin Olsen
- Recap, Game Book

Game information

**First quarter**

- SEA – Norm Johnson 34-yard field goal, 7:16. Seahawks 3–0. **Drive: 10 plays, 29 yards, 4:18.**

**Second quarter**

- SEA – Daryl Turner 9-yard pass from Dave Krieg (Norm Johnson kick), 9:47. Seahawks 10–0. **Drive: 3 plays, 15 yards, 1:35.**
- KC – Carlos Carson 10-yard pass from Todd Blackledge (Nick Lowery kick), 3:56. Seahawks 10–7. **Drive: 10 plays, 74 yards, 5:42.**
- SEA – Daryl Turner 17-yard pass from Dave Krieg (Norm Johnson kick), 0:51. Seahawks 17–7. **Drive: 8 plays, 68 yards, 2:56.**

**Third quarter**

- SEA – Mike Tice 2-yard pass from Dave Krieg (Norm Johnson kick), 10:06. Seahawks 24–7. **Drive: 7 plays, 25 yards, 2:33.**
- SEA – Norm Johnson 25-yard field goal, 8:05. Seahawks 27–7. **Drive: 4 plays, 2 yards, 1:00.**
- SEA – John Williams 1-yard run (Norm Johnson kick), 4:42. Seahawks 34–7. **Drive: 4 plays, 57 yards, 2:15.**
- SEA – Norm Johnson 46-yard field goal, 0:43. Seahawks 37–7. **Drive: 5 plays, 25 yards, 2:28.**

**Fourth quarter**

- SEA – Norm Johnson 27-yard field goal, 8:28. Seahawks 40–7. **Drive: 9 plays, 41 yards, 6:25.**
- SEA – Norm Johnson 49-yard field goal, 4:15. Seahawks 43–7. **Drive: 5 plays, 15 yards, 2:18.**
- KC – Carlos Carson 10-yard pass from Bill Kenney (Nick Lowery kick), 1:07. Seahawks 43–14. **Drive: 9 plays, 64 yards, 2:49.**

**Top passers**

- KC – Bill Kenney – 6/11, 75 yards, TD, INT
- SEA – Dave Krieg – 16/22, 152 yards, 3 TD

**Top rushers**

- KC – Christian Okoye – 11 rushes, 30 yards
- SEA – John Williams – 15 rushes, 112 yards, TD

**Top receivers**

- KC – Carlos Carson – 5 receptions, 83 yards, 2 TD
- SEA – Ray Butler – 4 receptions, 50 yards

==== Week 4: at Los Angeles Raiders ====
Week 4: Kansas City Chiefs at Los Angeles Raiders – Game summary

Quarter	1	2	3	4	Total
Chiefs	0	0	14	3	**17**
**Raiders**	14	7	7	7	**35**

at Los Angeles Memorial Coliseum, Los Angeles, California

- Date: October 4
- Game time: 3:00 p.m. CDT/1:00 p.m. PDT
- Game weather: Clear, 106 °F (41 °C)
- Game attendance: 10,708
- Referee: Ben Dreith
- TV announcers (NBC): Charlie Jones and Jimmy Cefalo
- Recap, Game Book

Game information

**First quarter**

- RAI – Carl Aikens 27-yard pass from Vince Evans (David Hardy kick), 14:05. Raiders 7–0. **Drive: 2 plays, 31 yards, 0:42.**
- RAI – Craig Ellis 2-yard run (David Hardy kick), 9:32. Raiders 14–0. **Drive: 7 plays, 65 yards, 2:55.**

**Second quarter**

- RAI – Vince Evans 4-yard run (David Hardy kick), 10:04. Raiders 21–0. **Drive: 6 plays, 82 yards, 4:11.**

**Third quarter**

- KC – Bob Harris 23-yard return of blocked punt (James Hamrick kick), 9:27. Raiders 21–7.
- RAI – Ethan Horton 32-yard pass from Vince Evans (David Hardy kick), 5:06. Raiders 28–7. **Drive: 7 plays, 89 yards, 4:21.**
- KC – Rod Jones 4-yard pass from Matt Stevens (James Hamrick kick), 0:59. Raiders 28–14. **Drive: 7 plays, 53 yards, 4:07.**

**Fourth quarter**

- RAI – Craig Ellis 8-yard run (David Hardy kick), 14:44. Raiders 35–14. **Drive: 7 plays, 64 yards, 1:15.**
- KC – James Hamrick 40-yard field goal, 8:11. Raiders 35–17. **Drive: 12 plays, 54 yards, 6:33.**

**Top passers**

- KC – Matt Stevens – 14/25, 162 yards, TD
- RAI – Vince Evans – 10/18, 148 yards, 2 TD

**Top rushers**

- KC – Ken Lacy – 13 rushes, 45 yards
- RAI – Craig Ellis – 12 rushes, 70 yards, 2 TD

**Top receivers**

- KC – Eric Brown – 5 receptions, 69 yards
- RAI – Greg Lathan – 2 receptions, 66 yards

==== Week 5: at Miami Dolphins ====
Week 5: Kansas City Chiefs at Miami Dolphins – Game summary

Quarter	1	2	3	4	Total
Chiefs	0	0	0	0	**0**
**Dolphins**	7	7	21	7	**42**

at Joe Robbie Stadium, Miami, Florida

- Date: October 11
- Game time: 1:00 p.m. EDT/12:00 p.m. CDT
- Game weather: Cloudy, 79 °F (26 °C)
- Game attendance: 25,867
- Referee: Jerry Seeman
- TV announcers (NBC): Dick Enberg and Merlin Olsen
- Recap, Game Book

Game information

**First quarter**

- MIA – Rickey Isom 6-yard run (Willie Beecher kick), 6:01. Dolphins 7–0. **Drive: 7 plays, 54 yards, 3:28.**

**Second quarter**

- MIA – Ronald Scott 2-yard run (Willie Beecher kick), 2:53. Dolphins 14–0. **Drive: 13 plays, 82 yards, 5:30.**

**Third quarter**

- MIA – Ronald Scott 4-yard run (Willie Beecher kick), 11:54. Dolphins 21–0. **Drive: 6 plays, 64 yards, 3:06.**
- MIA – Liffort Hobley 55-yard fumble return (Willie Beecher kick), 11:18. Dolphins 28–0.
- MIA – Trell Hooper 59-yard fumble return (Willie Beecher kick), 8:27. Dolphins 35–0.

**Fourth quarter**

- MIA – Ronald Scott 3-yard run (Willie Beecher kick), 10:11. Dolphins 42–0. **Drive: 13 plays, 81 yards, 7:48.**

**Top passers**

- KC – Alex Espinoza – 9/14, 69 yards, 2 INT
- MIA – Kyle Mackey – 14/28, 127 yards

**Top rushers**

- KC – Robert Parker – 20 rushes, 46 yards
- MIA – Ronald Scott – 18 rushes, 99 yards, 3 TD

**Top receivers**

- KC – Chris Smith – 2 receptions, 21 yards
- MIA – Lawrence Sampleton – 5 receptions, 45 yards

==== Week 6: vs. Denver Broncos ====
Week 6: Denver Broncos at Kansas City Chiefs – Game summary

Quarter	1	2	3	4	Total
**Broncos**	9	10	0	7	**26**
Chiefs	7	7	3	0	**17**

at Arrowhead Stadium, Kansas City, Missouri

- Date: October 18
- Game time: 3:00 p.m. CDT
- Game weather: Sunny, 71 °F (22 °C)
- Game attendance: 20,296
- Referee: Jerry Markbreit
- TV announcers (NBC): Don Criqui and Bob Trumpy
- Recap, Game Book

Game information

**First quarter**

- DEN – Doug Hudson tackled in end zone by Jim Ryan for a Safety, 10:48. Broncos 2–0.
- DEN – Bobby Micho 26-yard pass from Ken Karcher (Mike Clendenen kick), 7:08. Broncos 9–0. **Drive: 6 plays, 55 yards, 3:29.**
- KC – Jitter Fields 85-yard punt return (James Hamrick kick), 3:08. Broncos 9–7.

**Second quarter**

- DEN – Mike Clendenen 35-yard field goal, 13:25. Broncos 12–7. **Drive: 12 plays, 59 yards, 4:43.**
- KC – Robert Parker 4-yard run (James Hamrick kick), 9:23. Chiefs 14–12. **Drive: 11 plays, 77 yards, 3:54.**
- DEN – Shane Swanson 35-yard pass from Ken Karcher (Mike Clendenen kick), 0:37. Broncos 19–14. **Drive: 13 plays, 80 yards, 4:49.**

**Third quarter**

- KC – James Hamrick 25-yard field goal, 9:34. Broncos 19–17. **Drive: 12 plays, 39 yards, 5:09.**

**Fourth quarter**

- DEN – Bobby Micho 5-yard pass from Ken Karcher (Mike Clendenen kick), 10:35. Broncos 26–17. **Drive: 6 plays, 31 yards, 2:30.**

**Top passers**

- DEN – Ken Karcher – 25/39, 275 yards, 3 TD, 2 INT
- KC – Matt Stevens – 17/28, 148 yards, INT

**Top rushers**

- DEN – Nathan Poole – 18 rushes, 63 yards
- KC – Robert Parker – 15 rushes, 65 yards, TD

**Top receivers**

- DEN – Bobby Micho – 9 receptions, 105 yards, 2 TD
- KC – Rod Jones – 5 receptions, 51 yards

==== Week 7: at San Diego Chargers ====
Week 7: Kansas City Chiefs at San Diego Chargers – Game summary

Quarter	1	2	3	4	Total
Chiefs	0	14	7	0	**21**
**Chargers**	14	21	0	7	**42**

at Jack Murphy Stadium, San Diego, California

- Date: October 25
- Game time: 3:00 p.m. CST/1:00 p.m. PST
- Game weather: Overcast, 72 °F (22 °C)
- Game attendance: 47,972
- Referee: Bob Frederic
- TV announcers (NBC): Tom Hammond and Dave Casper
- Recap, Game Book

Game information

**First quarter**

- SD – Wes Chandler 10-yard pass from Dan Fouts (Vince Abbott kick), 9:46. Chargers 7–0. **Drive: 10 plays, 75 yards, 5:14.**
- SD – Gary Anderson 1-yard run (Vince Abbott kick), 0:10. Chargers 14–0. **Drive: 11 plays, 91 yards, 5:41.**

**Second quarter**

- SD – Les Miller fumble recovery in endzone (Vince Abbott kick), 11:26. Chargers 21–0.
- SD – Dan Fouts 1-yard run (Vince Abbott kick), 6:23. Chargers 28–0. **Drive: 6 plays, 38 yards, 2:51.**
- KC – Carlos Carson 14-yard pass from Bill Kenney (Nick Lowery kick), 4:34. Chargers 28–7. **Drive: 7 plays, 78 yards, 1:49.**
- SD – Kellen Winslow 19-yard pass from Dan Fouts (Vince Abbott kick), 1:17. Chargers 35–7. **Drive: 7 plays, 71 yards, 3:17.**
- KC – Carlos Carson 63-yard pass from Bill Kenney (Nick Lowery kick), 1:03. Chargers 35–14. **Drive: 1 play, 63 yards, 0:14.**

**Third quarter**

- KC – Christian Okoye 1-yard run (Nick Lowery kick), 7:37. Chargers 35–21. **Drive: 6 plays, 93 yards, 2:01.**

**Fourth quarter**

- SD – Gary Anderson 1-yard run (Vince Abbott kick), 11:44. Chargers 42–21. **Drive: 10 plays, 55 yards, 3:51.**

**Top passers**

- KC – Bill Kenney – 22/37, 328 yards, 2 TD, INT
- SD – Dan Fouts – 24/34, 293 yards, 2 TD

**Top rushers**

- KC – Christian Okoye – 8 rushes, 44 yards, TD
- SD – Lionel James – 6 rushes, 40 yards

**Top receivers**

- KC – Carlos Carson – 9 receptions, 197 yards, 2 TD
- SD – Lionel James – 5 receptions, 72 yards

==== Week 8: at Chicago Bears ====
Week 8: Kansas City Chiefs at Chicago Bears – Game summary

Quarter	1	2	3	4	Total
Chiefs	14	7	7	0	**28**
**Bears**	7	7	3	14	**31**

at Soldier Field, Chicago, Illinois

- Date: November 1
- Game time: 12:00 p.m. CST
- Game weather: Fog, 62 °F (17 °C)
- Game attendance: 63,498
- Referee: Tom Dooley
- TV announcers (NBC): Dick Enberg and Paul Maguire
- Recap, Game Book

Game information

**First quarter**

- KC – Carlos Carson 29-yard pass from Bill Kenney (Nick Lowery kick), 9:18. Chiefs 7–0. **Drive: 10 plays, 81 yards, 5:42.**
- KC – Jonathan Hayes 15-yard pass from Bill Kenney (Nick Lowery kick), 5:19. Chiefs 14–0. **Drive: 7 plays, 41 yards, 2:59.**
- CHI – Dennis Gentry 88-yard kickoff return (Kevin Butler kick), 5:00. Chiefs 14–7.

**Second quarter**

- CHI – Cap Boso 28-yard pass from Jim McMahon (Kevin Butler kick), 5:05. Tied 14–14. **Drive: 10 plays, 80 yards, 4:15.**
- KC – Larry Moriarty 4-yard pass from Bill Kenney (Nick Lowery kick), 0:00. Chiefs 21–14. **Drive: 9 plays, 56 yards, 5:05.**

**Third quarter**

- KC – Stephone Paige 43-yard pass from Bill Kenney (Nick Lowery kick), 11:43. Chiefs 28–14. **Drive: 4 plays, 57 yards, 1:33.**
- CHI – Kevin Butler 27-yard field goal, 2:30. Chiefs 28–17. **Drive: 10 plays, 49 yards, 3:38.**

**Fourth quarter**

- CHI – Willie Gault 25-yard pass from Jim McMahon (Kevin Butler kick), 13:23. Chiefs 28–24. **Drive: 6 plays, 47 yards, 2:23.**
- CHI – Willie Gault 38-yard pass from Jim McMahon (Kevin Butler kick), 4:44. Bears 31–28. **Drive: 9 plays, 79 yards, 4:32.**

**Top passers**

- KC – Bill Kenney – 15/28, 270 yards, 4 TD, INT
- CHI – Jim McMahon – 23/34, 287 yards, 3 TD, INT

**Top rushers**

- KC – Christian Okoye – 22 rushes, 93 yards
- CHI – Neal Anderson – 17 rushes, 59 yards

**Top receivers**

- KC – Stephone Paige – 5 receptions, 121 yards, TD
- CHI – Willie Gault – 4 receptions, 98 yards, 2 TD

==== Week 9: vs. Pittsburgh Steelers ====
Week 9: Pittsburgh Steelers at Kansas City Chiefs – Game summary

Quarter	1	2	3	4	Total
**Steelers**	0	7	7	3	**17**
Chiefs	7	3	0	6	**16**

at Arrowhead Stadium, Kansas City, Missouri

- Date: November 8
- Game time: 12:00 p.m. CST
- Game weather: Sunny, 62 °F (17 °C)
- Game attendance: 45,249
- Referee: Jim Tunney
- TV announcers (NBC): Tom Hammond and Michael Jackson
- Recap, Game Book

Game information

**First quarter**

- KC – Bill Maas 6-yard fumble return (Nick Lowery kick), 13:45. Chiefs 7–0.

**Second quarter**

- PIT – Rodney Carter 4-yard pass from Mark Malone (Gary Anderson kick), 3:59. Tied 7–7. **Drive: 13 plays, 90 yards, 6:30.**
- KC – Nick Lowery 41-yard field goal, 0:32. Chiefs 10–7. **Drive: 5 plays, 14 yards, 1:16.**

**Third quarter**

- PIT – Rodney Carter 26-yard pass from Mark Malone (Gary Anderson kick), 9:55. Steelers 14–10. **Drive: 11 plays, 77 yards, 5:05.**

**Fourth quarter**

- KC – Nick Lowery 27-yard field goal, 14:40. Steelers 14–13. **Drive: 6 plays, 17 yards, 2:04.**
- KC – Nick Lowery 38-yard field goal, 10:36. Chiefs 16–14. **Drive: 4 plays, 4 yards, 2:18.**
- PIT – Gary Anderson 44-yard field goal, 4:02. Steelers 17–16. **Drive: 4 plays, 0 yards, 1:48.**

**Top passers**

- PIT – Mark Malone – 14/31, 157 yards, 2 TD, 2 INT
- KC – Bill Kenney – 14/29, 155 yards, 4 INT

**Top rushers**

- PIT – Earnest Jackson – 23 rushes, 125 yards
- KC – Christian Okoye – 19 rushes, 72 yards

**Top receivers**

- PIT – John Stallworth – 6 receptions, 66 yards
- KC – Carlos Carson – 5 receptions, 70 yards

==== Week 10: vs. New York Jets ====
Week 10: New York Jets at Kansas City Chiefs – Game summary

Quarter	1	2	3	4	Total
**Jets**	3	0	3	10	**16**
Chiefs	0	3	6	0	**9**

at Arrowhead Stadium, Kansas City, Missouri

- Date: November 15
- Game time: 12:00 p.m. CST
- Game weather: Overcast, 60 °F (16 °C)
- Game attendance: 40,718
- Referee: Fred Silva
- TV announcers (NBC): Don Criqui and Paul Maguire
- Recap, Game Book

Game information

**First quarter**

- NYJ – Pat Leahy 39-yard field goal, 2:03. Jets 3–0. **Drive: 8 plays, 33 yards, 4:13.**

**Second quarter**

- KC – Nick Lowery 42-yard field goal, 12:44. Tied 3–3. **Drive: 10 plays, 50 yards, 4:09.**

**Third quarter**

- KC – Nick Lowery 43-yard field goal, 10:58. Chiefs 6–3. **Drive: 6 plays, 34 yards, 4:02.**
- NYJ – Pat Leahy 24-yard field goal, 5:43. Tied 6–6. **Drive: 10 plays, 64 yards, 5:05.**
- KC – Nick Lowery 18-yard field goal, 0:31. Chiefs 9–6. **Drive: 10 plays, 79 yards, 5:12.**

**Fourth quarter**

- NYJ – Al Toon 18-yard pass from Ken O'Brien (Pat Leahy kick), 11:04. Jets 13–9. **Drive: 9 plays, 63 yards, 4:25.**
- NYJ – Pat Leahy 21-yard field goal, 2:19. Jets 16–9. **Drive: 8 plays, 32 yards, 4:58.**

**Top passers**

- NYJ – Ken O'Brien – 14/22, 132 yards, TD
- KC – Frank Seurer – 13/23, 233 yards, 3 INT

**Top rushers**

- NYJ – Freeman McNeil – 26 rushes, 184 yards
- KC – Christian Okoye – 13 rushes, 58 yards

**Top receivers**

- NYJ – Al Toon – 3 receptions, 36 yards, TD
- KC – Jonathan Hayes – 5 receptions, 105 yards

==== Week 11: vs. Green Bay Packers ====
Week 11: Green Bay Packers at Kansas City Chiefs – Game summary

Quarter	1	2	3	4	Total
**Packers**	7	0	13	3	**23**
Chiefs	0	0	3	0	**3**

at Arrowhead Stadium, Kansas City, Missouri

- Date: November 22
- Game time: 12:00 p.m. CST
- Game weather: Overcast, 56 °F (13 °C)
- Game attendance: 34,611
- Referee: Pat Haggerty
- TV announcers (CBS): James Brown and Dan Jiggetts
- Recap, Game Book

Game information

**First quarter**

- GB – Paul Ott Carruth 6-yard run (Max Zendejas kick), 10:49. Packers 7–0. **Drive: 5 plays, 48 yards, 2:19.**

**Second quarter**

- No scoring plays.

**Third quarter**

- KC – Nick Lowery 34-yard field goal, 13:32. Packers 7–3. **Drive: 4 plays, 0 yards, 1:17.**
- GB – Frankie Neal 13-yard pass from Randy Wright (Max Zendejas kick), 3:46. Packers 14–3. **Drive: 15 plays, 68 yards, 6:42.**
- GB – Frankie Neal 26-yard pass from Randy Wright (kick aborted), 2:51. Packers 20–3. **Drive: 2 plays, 29 yards, 0:48.**

**Fourth quarter**

- GB – Max Zendejas 40-yard field goal, 1:52. Packers 23–3. **Drive: 10 plays, 79 yards, 2:43.**

**Top passers**

- GB – Randy Wright – 7/15, 91 yards, 2 TD
- KC – Frank Seurer – 13/32, 107 yards, INT

**Top rushers**

- GB – Brent Fullwood – 23 rushes, 68 yards
- KC – Christian Okoye – 15 rushes, 67 yards

**Top receivers**

- GB – Frankie Neal – 3 receptions, 46 yards, 2 TD
- KC – Stephone Paige – 3 receptions, 36 yards

==== Week 12: at Detroit Lions ====
Thanksgiving Day games

Week 12: Kansas City Chiefs at Detroit Lions – Game summary

Quarter	1	2	3	4	Total
**Chiefs**	7	17	3	0	**27**
Lions	0	10	3	7	**20**

at Pontiac Silverdome, Pontiac, Michigan

- Date: November 26
- Game time: 12:30 p.m. EST/11:30 a.m. CST
- Game weather: None (indoor stadium)
- Game attendance: 43,820
- Referee: Gordon McCarter
- TV announcers (NBC): Dick Enberg and Merlin Olsen
- Recap

Game information

**First quarter**

- KC – Jonathan Hayes 7-yard pass from Bill Kenney (Nick Lowery kick), 8:59. Chiefs 7–0. **Drive: 10 plays, 67 yards, 6:01.**

**Second quarter**

- KC – Paul Coffman 13-yard pass from Bill Kenney (Nick Lowery kick), 10:49. Chiefs 14–0. **Drive: 12 plays, 80 yards, 5:44.**
- DET – Karl Bernard 11-yard run (Eddie Murray kick), 7:27. Chiefs 14–7. **Drive: 9 plays, 69 yards, 5:50.**
- KC – Nick Lowery 52-yard field goal, 5:22. Chiefs 17–7. **Drive: 5 plays, 46 yards, 2:05.**
- KC – Herman Heard 2-yard run (Nick Lowery kick), 1:33. Chiefs 24–7. **Drive: 6 plays, 84 yards, 1:17.**
- DET – Eddie Murray 48-yard field goal, 0:00. Chiefs 24–10. **Drive: 7 plays, 49 yards, 1:33.**

**Third quarter**

- DET – Eddie Murray 37-yard field goal, 6:17. Chiefs 24–13. **Drive: 6 plays, 22 yards, 2:33.**
- KC – Nick Lowery 54-yard field goal, 1:52. Chiefs 27–13. **Drive: 11 plays, 41 yards, 4:13.**

**Fourth quarter**

- DET – Gary Ellerson 10-yard pass from Chuck Long (Eddie Murray kick), 1:48. Chiefs 27–20. **Drive: 6 plays, 55 yards, 1:41.**

**Top passers**

- KC – Bill Kenney – 18/26, 246 yards, TD
- DET – Chuck Long – 21/41, 206 yards, TD

**Top rushers**

- KC – Herman Heard – 14 rushes, 87 yards, TD
- DET – Karl Bernard – 20 rushes, 99 yards, TD

**Top receivers**

- KC – Carlos Carson – 4 receptions, 87 yards
- DET – Jeff Chadwick – 5 receptions, 50 yards

==== Week 13: at Cincinnati Bengals ====
Week 13: Kansas City Chiefs at Cincinnati Bengals – Game summary

Quarter	1	2	3	4	OT	Total
Chiefs	0	3	14	10	0	**27**
**Bengals**	10	7	3	7	3	**30**

at Riverfront Stadium, Cincinnati, Ohio

- Date: December 6
- Game time: 1:00 p.m. EST/12:00 p.m. CST
- Game weather: Overcast, 38 °F (3 °C)
- Game attendance: 46,489
- Referee: Jerry Seeman
- TV announcers (NBC): Mel Proctor and Reggie Rucker
- Recap

Game information

**First quarter**

- CIN – Larry Kinnebrew 1-yard run (Jim Breech kick), 3:24. Bengals 7–0.
- CIN – Jim Breech 37-yard field goal, 0:07. Bengals 10–0.

**Second quarter**

- KC – Nick Lowery 39-yard field goal, 6:14. Bengals 10–3.
- CIN – Tim McGee 8-yard pass from Boomer Esiason (Jim Breech kick), 0:03. Bengals 17–3.

**Third quarter**

- KC – Christian Okoye 1-yard run (Nick Lowery kick), 11:16. Bengals 17–10.
- CIN – Jim Breech 27-yard field goal, 6:53. Bengals 20–10.
- KC – Stephone Paige 24-yard pass from Bill Kenney (Nick Lowery kick), 1:18. Bengals 20–17.

**Fourth quarter**

- KC – Kevin Ross 65-yard return of blocked field goal (Nick Lowery kick), 7:00. Chiefs 24–20.
- CIN – James Brooks 23-yard pass from Boomer Esiason (Jim Breech kick), 4:51. Bengals 27–24.
- KC – Nick Lowery 33-yard field goal, 0:00. Tied 27–27.

**Overtime**

- CIN – Jim Breech 32-yard field goal, 5:16. Bengals 30–27.

**Top passers**

- KC – Bill Kenney – 19/39, 229 yards, TD
- CIN – Boomer Esiason – 28/44, 368 yards, 2 TD

**Top rushers**

- KC – Paul Palmer – 5 rushes, 41 yards
- CIN – Larry Kinnebrew – 20 rushes, 67 yards, TD

**Top receivers**

- KC – Stephone Paige – 6 receptions, 88 yards, TD
- CIN – Rodney Holman – 5 receptions, 90 yards

==== Week 14: vs. Los Angeles Raiders ====
Week 14: Los Angeles Raiders at Kansas City Chiefs – Game summary

Quarter	1	2	3	4	Total
Raiders	0	3	7	0	**10**
**Chiefs**	0	7	3	6	**16**

at Arrowhead Stadium, Kansas City, Missouri

- Date: December 13
- Game time: 3:00 p.m. CST
- Game weather: Cloudy, 41 °F (5 °C)
- Game attendance: 63,834
- Referee: Gene Barth
- TV announcers (NBC): Charlie Jones and Jimmy Cefalo
- Recap, Game Book

Game information

**First quarter**

- No scoring plays.

**Second quarter**

- KC – Carlos Carson 67-yard pass from Bill Kenney (Nick Lowery kick), 7:56. Chiefs 7–0. **Drive: 5 plays, 95 yards, 2:19.**
- RAI – Chris Bahr 23-yard field goal, 0:51. Chiefs 7–3. **Drive: 11 plays, 64 yards, 3:19.**

**Third quarter**

- RAI – Marcus Allen 3-yard run (Chris Bahr kick), 5:53. Raiders 10–7. **Drive: 12 plays, 59 yards, 7:03.**
- KC – Nick Lowery 39-yard field goal, 0:59. Tied 10–10. **Drive: 12 plays, 57 yards, 4:43.**

**Fourth quarter**

- KC – Nick Lowery 22-yard field goal, 11:44. Chiefs 13–10. **Drive: 4 plays, 49 yards, 2:22.**
- KC – Nick Lowery 35-yard field goal, 3:36. Chiefs 16–10. **Drive: 13 plays, 63 yards, 4:58.**

**Top passers**

- RAI – Marc Wilson – 22/38, 339 yards, 3 INT
- KC – Bill Kenney – 10/27, 194 yards, TD, INT

**Top rushers**

- RAI – Marcus Allen – 18 rushes, 60 yards, TD
- KC – Christian Okoye – 13 rushes, 48 yards

**Top receivers**

- RAI – James Lofton – 5 receptions, 112 yards
- KC – Carlos Carson – 4 receptions, 142 yards, TD

==== Week 15: at Denver Broncos ====
Week 15: Kansas City Chiefs at Denver Broncos – Game summary

Quarter	1	2	3	4	Total
Chiefs	0	3	7	7	**17**
**Broncos**	7	10	3	0	**20**

at Mile High Stadium, Denver, Colorado

- Date: December 19
- Game time: 3:00 p.m. CST/2:00 p.m. MST
- Game weather: Cloudy, 35 °F (2 °C)
- Game attendance: 75,053
- Referee: Dick Jorgensen
- TV announcers (NBC): Charlie Jones and Jimmy Cefalo
- Recap, Game Book

Game information

**First quarter**

- DEN – Gene Lang 3-yard run (Rich Karlis kick), 6:33. Broncos 7–0. **Drive: 9 plays, 76 yards, 4:23.**

**Second quarter**

- DEN – Rich Karlis 20-yard field goal, 12:14. Broncos 10–0. **Drive: 13 plays, 72 yards, 6:01.**
- KC – Nick Lowery 23-yard field goal, 8:21. Broncos 10–3. **Drive: 6 plays, 25 yards, 2:38.**
- DEN – Sammy Winder 8-yard pass from John Elway (Rich Karlis kick), 1:31. Broncos 17–3. **Drive: 13 plays, 80 yards, 6:50.**

**Third quarter**

- KC – Herman Heard 64-yard run (Nick Lowery kick), 13:44. Broncos 17–10. **Drive: 1 play, 64 yards, 0:12.**
- DEN – Rich Karlis 43-yard field goal, 2:58. Broncos 20–10. **Drive: 13 plays, 69 yards, 7:50.**

**Fourth quarter**

- KC – Stephone Paige 8-yard pass from Bill Kenney (Nick Lowery kick), 6:36. Broncos 20–17. **Drive: 5 plays, 80 yards, 2:42.**

**Top passers**

- KC – Bill Kenney – 26/39, 272 yards, TD
- DEN – John Elway – 18/31, 237 yards, TD

**Top rushers**

- KC – Herman Heard – 10 rushes, 93 yards, TD
- DEN – Sammy Winder – 23 rushes, 98 yards

**Top receivers**

- KC – Stephone Paige – 5 receptions, 78 yards, TD
- DEN – Clarence Kay – 6 receptions, 91 yards

==== Week 16: vs. Seattle Seahawks ====
Week 16: Seattle Seahawks at Kansas City Chiefs – Game summary

Quarter	1	2	3	4	Total
Seahawks	7	13	0	0	**20**
**Chiefs**	17	10	7	7	**41**

at Arrowhead Stadium, Kansas City, Missouri

- Date: December 27
- Game time: 12:00 p.m. CST
- Game weather: Overcast and Drizzle, 35 °F (2 °C)
- Game attendance: 20,370
- Referee: Ben Dreith
- TV announcers (NBC): Gayle Sierens and Dave Rowe
- Recap, Game Book

Game information

**First quarter**

- KC – Herman Heard 37-yard run (Nick Lowery kick), 14:27. Chiefs 7–0. **Drive: 3 plays, 64 yards, 0:33.**
- SEA – Steve Largent 15-yard pass from Dave Krieg (Norm Johnson kick), 10:31. Tied 7–7. **Drive: 8 plays, 73 yards, 3:46.**
- KC – Nick Lowery 35-yard field goal, 5:00. Chiefs 10–7. **Drive: 13 plays, 57 yards, 5:22.**
- KC – Carlos Carson 81-yard pass from Bill Kenney (Nick Lowery kick), 2:54. Chiefs 17–7. **Drive: 2 plays, 85 yards, 0:49.**

**Second quarter**

- SEA – Paul Skansi 8-yard pass from Dave Krieg (Norm Johnson kick), 14:11. Chiefs 17–14. **Drive: 8 plays, 72 yards, 3:41.**
- KC – Paul Palmer 92-yard kickoff return (Nick Lowery kick), 13:53. Chiefs 24–14.
- SEA – Norm Johnson 39-yard field goal, 10:02. Chiefs 24–17. **Drive: 9 plays, 47 yards, 3:39.**
- SEA – Norm Johnson 24-yard field goal, 1:50. Chiefs 24–20. **Drive: 4 plays, 2 yards, 0:36.**
- KC – Nick Lowery 44-yard field goal, 0:05. Chiefs 27–20. **Drive: 9 plays, 48 yards, 1:40.**

**Third quarter**

- KC – Mark Adickes 3-yard pass from Bill Kenney (Nick Lowery kick), 6:06. Chiefs 34–20. **Drive: 15 plays, 81 yards, 5:58.**

**Fourth quarter**

- KC – Stephone Paige 46-yard pass from Bill Kenney (Nick Lowery kick), 13:46. Chiefs 41–20. **Drive: 9 plays, 80 yards, 1:42.**

**Top passers**

- SEA – Dave Krieg – 17/32, 202 yards, 2 TD
- KC – Bill Kenney – 23/35, 320 yards, 3 TD

**Top rushers**

- SEA – Curt Warner – 15 rushes, 85 yards
- KC – Herman Heard – 12 rushes, 107 yards, TD

**Top receivers**

- SEA – Steve Largent – 6 receptions, 95 yards, TD
- KC – Carlos Carson – 4 receptions, 120 yards, TD

=== Standings ===
AFC West
	W	L	T	PCT	DIV	CONF	PF	PA	STK
^{(1)} Denver Broncos	10	4	1	.700	7–1	8–3	379	288	W2
^{(5)} Seattle Seahawks	9	6	0	.600	4–3	5–6	371	314	L1
San Diego Chargers	8	7	0	.533	3–4	6–7	253	317	L6
Los Angeles Raiders	5	10	0	.333	2–6	3–8	301	289	L3
Kansas City Chiefs	4	11	0	.267	3–5	3–9	273	388	W1
