= List of Kansas City Chiefs starting quarterbacks =

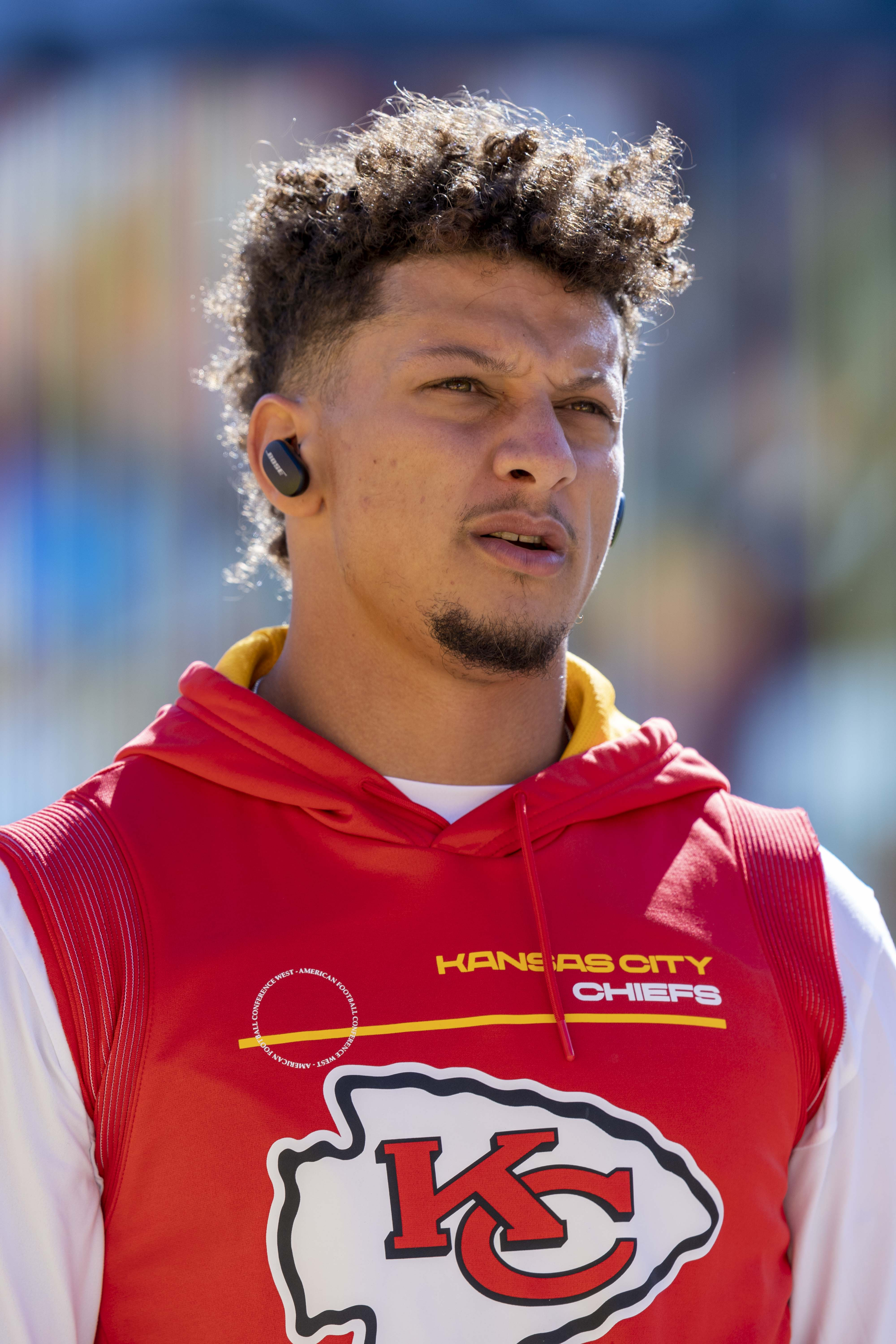
Patrick Mahomes has led the Chiefs to three Super Bowl victories

The Kansas City Chiefs are a professional American football team based in Kansas City, Missouri. The Chiefs are a member of the Western Division of the American Football Conference in the National Football League (NFL). Originally named the Dallas Texans, the club was founded by Lamar Hunt in 1960 as a charter member of the American Football League (AFL). In 1963, the team moved to Kansas City, Missouri and were renamed the Kansas City Chiefs.

The Chiefs have had 57 different quarterbacks attempt a pass, 39 different starting quarterbacks, and 19 different quarterbacks start at least 10 games. Eleven different quarterbacks have been named to either the AFL All-Star team or Pro Bowl for a total of 25 selections. Five of those quarterbacks have been name All-Star or Pro Bowl multiple times. Eleven of the Chiefs starting quarterbacks have led the Chiefs to the playoffs, however, only five have won a playoff game. Patrick Mahomes has been the Chiefs' starting quarterback since 2018. Mahomes has been the full-time starting quarterback since the beginning of the 2018 season, when he broke multiple single season team records and became the first Chiefs player to win MVP. However, after Mahomes and backup QB Gardner Minshew III injured themselves in December of 2025, Their emergency 3rd quarterback Chris Oladokun became the starter while they recover. Cotton Davidson was the team's first starting quarterback. He played all 14 games for the Texans in their inaugural 1960 season. Davidson played with the franchise from 1960 to 1962, and was traded in 1963 to the Oakland Raiders. Len Dawson signed with the Chiefs (then known as the Texans) on July 2, 1962, and played for the franchise for 14 seasons. With Dawson as the team's starter, the Texans/Chiefs won three American Football League championships and appeared in two Super Bowl championship games. Dawson was named Most Valuable Player after the Chiefs' victory in Super Bowl IV and retired in 1975 with several franchise records. Three quarterbacks currently in the Pro Football Hall of Fame have started at least one game for Kansas City: Dawson, Joe Montana, and Warren Moon. The most quarterbacks started in one season was five in 1987, however, this was primarily due to the player strike that led to teams using replacement players. The Chiefs have had the same quarterback start every game in a season 15 times. Trent Green started the most consecutive games with 81. Mahomes and Dawson are the only quarterbacks to lead the Chiefs to the Super Bowl, I and IV for Dawson and LIV, LV, LVII, LVIII, and LIX for Mahomes, with the Chiefs winning IV, LIV, LVII, and LVIII.

== Starting quarterbacks by season ==
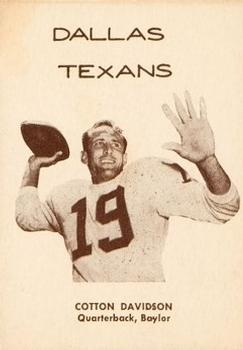
Cotton Davidson, the first starting quarterback in franchise history. Starter in 1960 and 1961

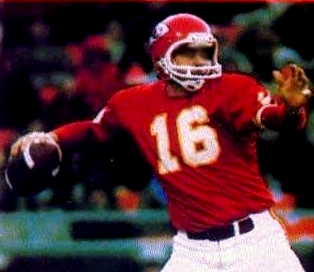
Len Dawson started games for the Chiefs from 1962 to 1975

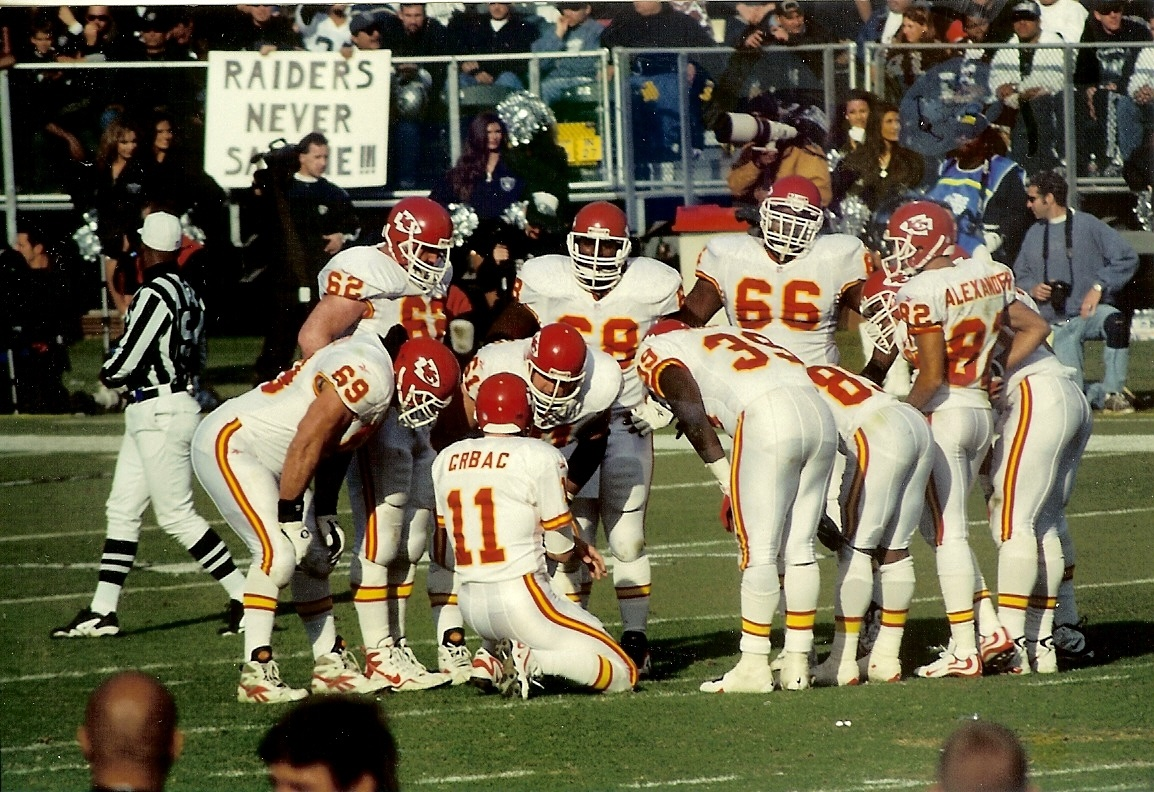
Elvis Grbac (#11) in huddle

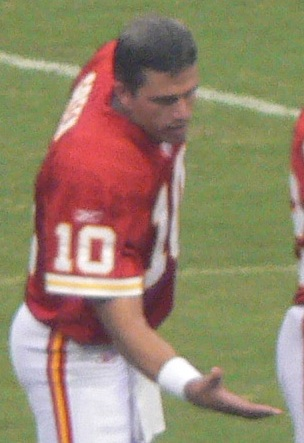
Trent Green was the team's starter from 2001 to 2006

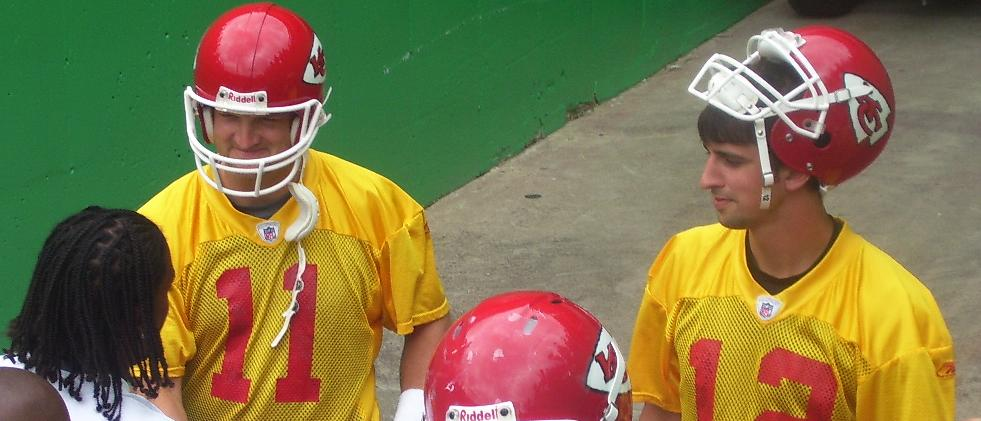
Damon Huard (left) and Brodie Croyle (right) split the starting quarterback duties in the 2007 season.

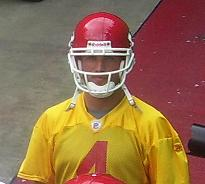
Tyler Thigpen was the third different starting quarterback for the Chiefs in the 2008 season.

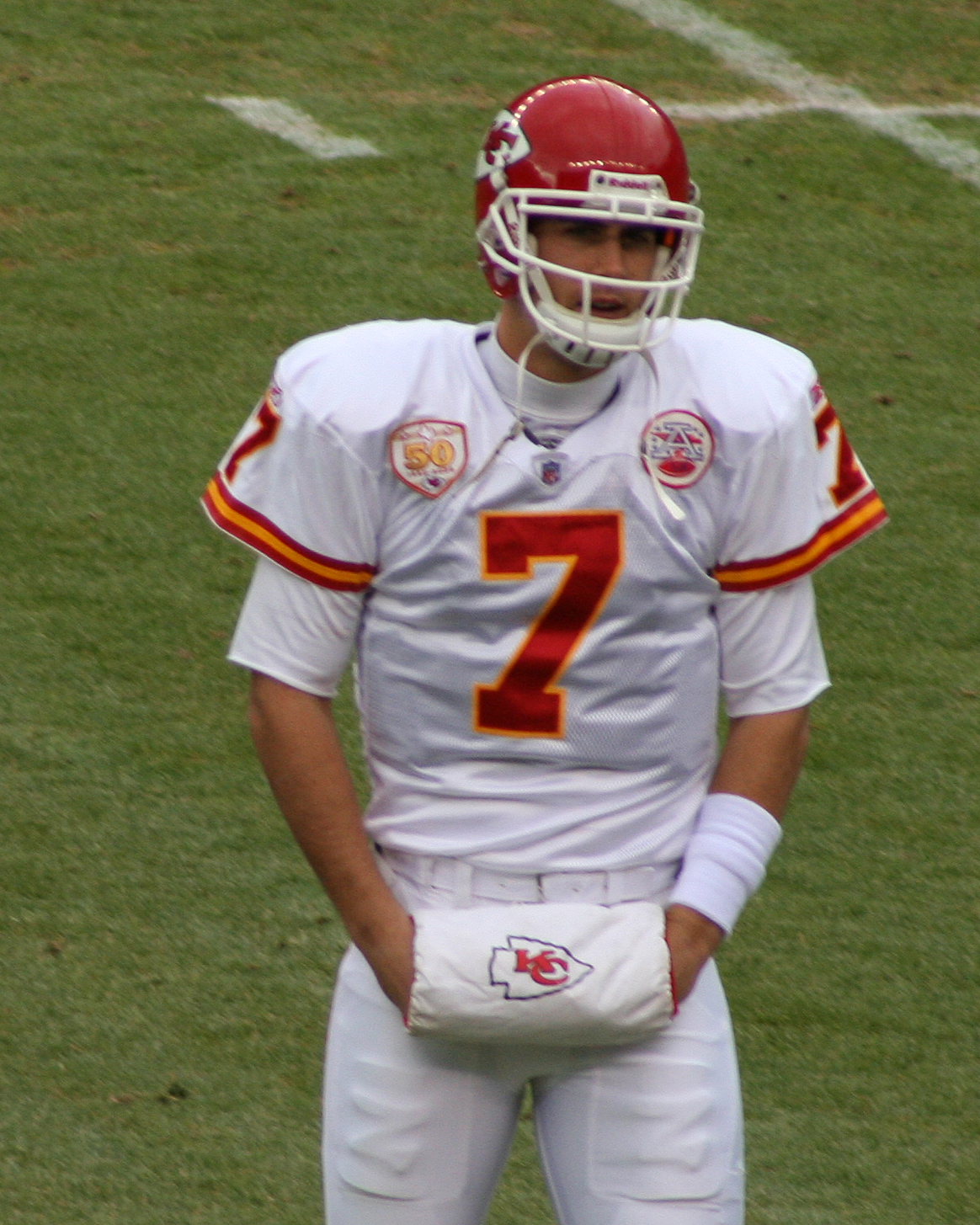
Matt Cassel's 15 starts in 2009 were the most for one Chiefs starting quarterback since Trent Green's complete season in 2005.

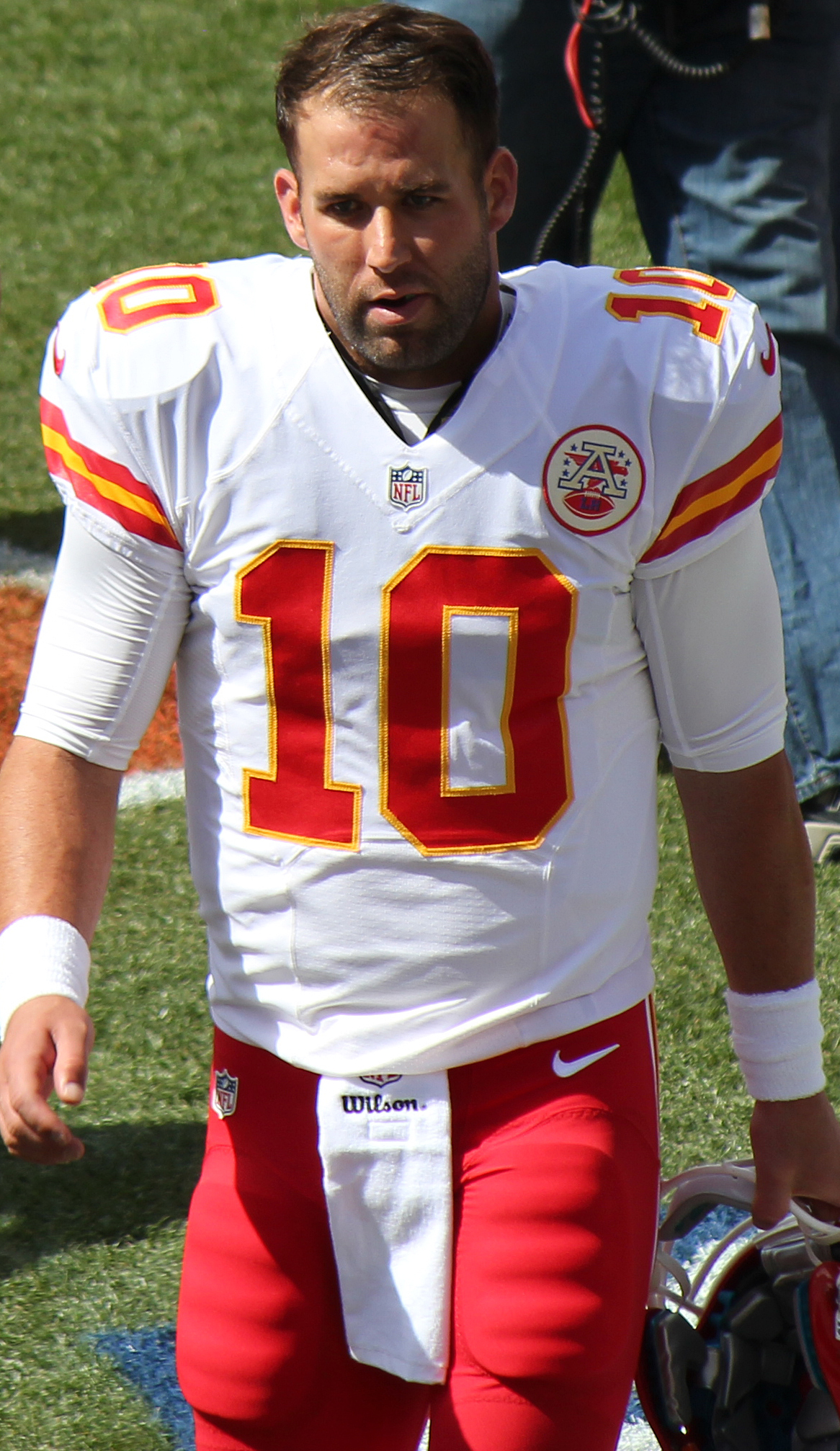
Chase Daniel started one game each in 2013 and 2014

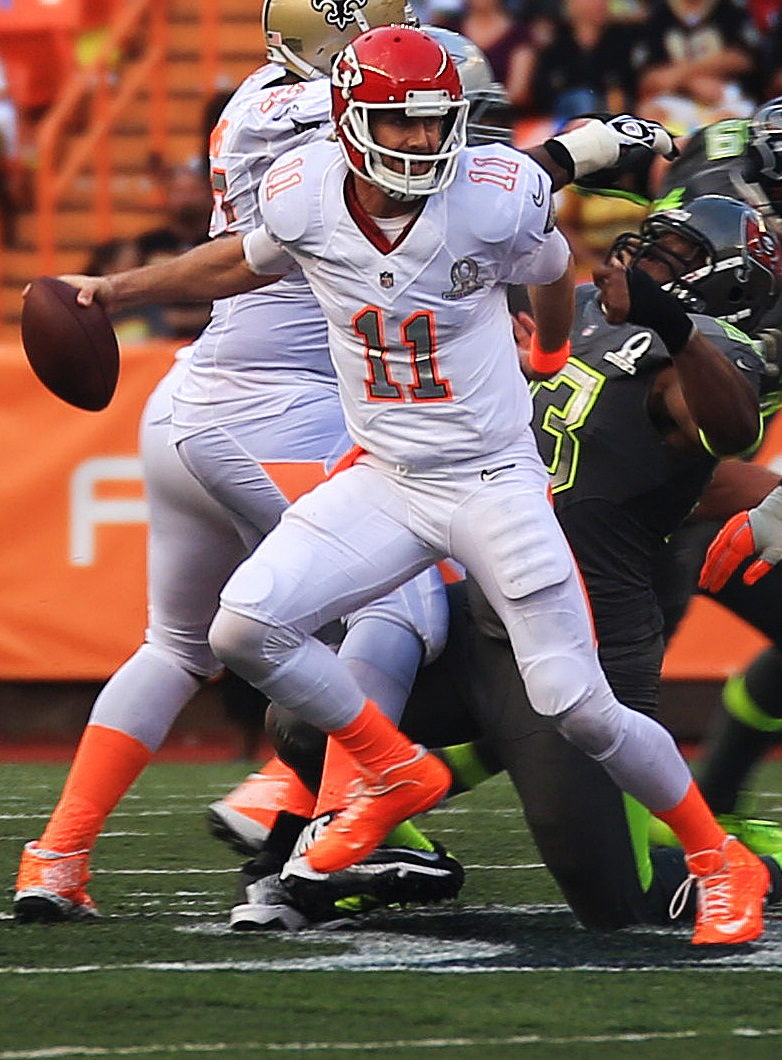
Alex Smith was the team's starter from 2013 to 2017

=== Regular-season ===
The number of games started in the season by each player is listed in small parentheses. Statistics do not include postseason starts.

14 game seasons

Season	Quarterback(s)	Reference(s)
Dallas Texans 1960–1962
1960	Cotton Davidson (12) / Hunter Enis (2)	
1961	Cotton Davidson (12) / Randy Duncan (2)	
1962	Len Dawson (14)	
Kansas City Chiefs 1963–present
1963	Len Dawson (13) / Eddie Wilson (1)	
1964	Len Dawson (14)	
1965	Len Dawson (12) / Pete Beathard (2)	
1966	Len Dawson (14)	
1967	Len Dawson (14)	
1968	Len Dawson (13) / Jacky Lee (1)	
1969	Len Dawson (7) / Jacky Lee (1) / Mike Livingston (6)	
1970	Len Dawson (12) / Mike Livingston (2)	
1971	Len Dawson (13) / Mike Livingston (1)	
1972	Len Dawson (12) / Mike Livingston (2)	
1973	Mike Livingston (8) / Len Dawson (6)	
1974	Len Dawson (8) / Mike Livingston (6)	
1975	Mike Livingston (7) / Len Dawson (5) / Tony Adams (2)	
1976	Mike Livingston (14)	
1977	Mike Livingston (11) / Tony Adams (3)	

16 game seasons

Season	Quarterback(s)	Reference(s)
1978	Mike Livingston (14) / Tony Adams (2)	
1979	Mike Livingston (4) / Steve Fuller (12)	
1980	Steve Fuller (13) / Bill Kenney (3)	
1981	Bill Kenney (13) / Steve Fuller (3)	
1982^{[a]}	Bill Kenney (6) / Steve Fuller (3)	
1983	Bill Kenney (16)	
1984	Todd Blackledge (8) / Bill Kenney (8)	
1985	Bill Kenney (10) / Todd Blackledge (6)	
1986	Todd Blackledge (8) / Bill Kenney (8)	
1987^{[a]}^{[b]}	Bill Kenney (8) / Frank Seurer (2) / Todd Blackledge (2) / Matt Stevens (2) / Doug Hudson (1)	
1988	Bill Kenney (5) / Steve DeBerg (11)	
1989	Steve DeBerg (10) / Ron Jaworski (3) / Steve Pelluer (3)	
1990	Steve DeBerg (16)	
1991	Steve DeBerg (15) / Mark Vlasic (1)	
1992	Dave Krieg (16)	
1993	Joe Montana (11) / Dave Krieg (5)	
1994	Joe Montana (14) / Steve Bono (2)	
1995	Steve Bono (16)	
1996	Steve Bono (13) / Rich Gannon (3)	
1997	Elvis Grbac (10) / Rich Gannon (6)	
1998	Elvis Grbac (6) / Rich Gannon (10)	
1999	Elvis Grbac (16)	
2000	Elvis Grbac (15) / Warren Moon (1)	
2001	Trent Green (16)	
2002	Trent Green (16)	
2003	Trent Green (16)	
2004	Trent Green (16)	
2005	Trent Green (16)	
2006	Trent Green (8) / Damon Huard (8)	
2007	Damon Huard (10) / Brodie Croyle (6)	
2008	Brodie Croyle (3) / Damon Huard (2) / Tyler Thigpen (11)	
2009	Matt Cassel (15) / Brodie Croyle (1)	
2010	Matt Cassel (15) / Brodie Croyle (1)	
2011	Matt Cassel (9) / Tyler Palko (4) / Kyle Orton (3)	
2012	Matt Cassel (8) / Brady Quinn (8)	
2013	Alex Smith (15) / Chase Daniel (1)	
2014	Alex Smith (15) / Chase Daniel (1)	
2015	Alex Smith (16)	
2016	Alex Smith (15) / Nick Foles (1)	
2017	Alex Smith (15) / Patrick Mahomes (1)	
2018	Patrick Mahomes (16)	
2019	Patrick Mahomes (14) / Matt Moore (2)	
2020	Patrick Mahomes (15) / Chad Henne (1)	

17 game seasons

Season	Quarterback(s)	Reference(s)
2021	Patrick Mahomes (17)	
2022	Patrick Mahomes (17)	
2023	Patrick Mahomes (16) / Blaine Gabbert (1)	
2024	Patrick Mahomes (16) / Carson Wentz (1)	
2025	Patrick Mahomes (14) / Chris Oladokun (2) / Gardner Minshew (1)	[103]
2026	Patrick Mahomes (3)	

=== Post-season records ===
Quarterback	Record
Patrick Mahomes	17–4
Len Dawson	5–3
Joe Montana	2–2
Steve DeBerg	1–2
Alex Smith	1–4
Todd Blackledge	0–1
Dave Krieg	0–1
Steve Bono	0–1
Elvis Grbac	0–1
Matt Cassel	0–1
Trent Green	0–2

=== All-Star/Pro Bowl quarterbacks ===
Quarterback	No. of selections
Len Dawson	7×
Patrick Mahomes	6×
Alex Smith	3×
Cotton Davidson	2×
Trent Green	2×
Steve Bono	1×
Matt Cassel	1×
Elvis Grbac	1×
Bill Kenney	1×
Mike Livingston	1×
Joe Montana	1×

== Most games as starting quarterback ==
Only the top 10 are listed below.

Rank	Name	Seasons	GS	GP	W	L	T	Pct
1	Len Dawson	1962–75	158	183	94	56	8	.620
2	Patrick Mahomes	2017–present	128	128	97	31	0	.758
3	Trent Green	2001–06	88	88	48	40	0	.545
4	Bill Kenney	1980–88	77	106	34	43	0	.442
5	Alex Smith	2013–17	76	76	50	26	0	.658
6	Mike Livingston	1968–79	75	90	30	43	1	.412
7	Steve DeBerg	1988-91	52	57	31	20	1	.606
8	Elvis Grbac	1997–2000	47	49	26	21	0	.553
8	Matt Cassel	2009–12	47	48	19	28	0	.404
10	Steve Fuller	1979–82	31	52	13	18	0	.419
10	Steve Bono	1994–96	31	37	21	10	0	.677

As of week 2 of the 2026 season

== Team career passing leaders ==
Below are the top five quarterbacks in each category throughout their tenure with the Chiefs. Stats are complete through week 2 of the 2026 NFL Season.

Yards

Name	Yards
Patrick Mahomes	36,505
Len Dawson	28,507
Trent Green	21,459
Alex Smith	17,608
Bill Kenney	17,277

Touchdowns

Name	TDs
Patrick Mahomes	272
Len Dawson	237
Trent Green	118
Bill Kenney	105
Alex Smith	102

Quarterback rating (minimum 500 attempts)

Name	Rating
Patrick Mahomes	100.8
Alex Smith	94.8
Trent Green	87.3
Joe Montana	85.0
Damon Huard	83.3

== See also ==
- History of the Kansas City Chiefs

== Notes ==
^{a} : Strikes by the National Football League Players Association in the 1982 and 1987 seasons resulted in shortened seasons (9 and 15-game schedules, respectively).
^{b} : Replacement quarterbacks Matt Stevens, Frank Seurer, and Doug Hudson started for the Chiefs alongside Kenney and Blackledge following the NFL Players Association strike in 1987. For the only time in team history, five different quarterbacks started in 1987 following the player's strike.
