= Frank Gansz =

American football player and coach (1938–2009)

Personal information
- Born: November 22, 1938; Altoona, Pennsylvania
- Died: April 27, 2009 (aged 70); Dallas, Texas

Career information
- College: Navy (1957–1959)

Career history
- Air Force (1964–1966) Assistant coach; Colgate (1968) Assistant coach; Navy (1969–1972) Assistant coach; Oklahoma State (1973) Wide receivers coach; Army (1974) Offensive coordinator; Oklahoma State (1975) Wide receivers coach; UCLA (1976–1977) Offensive line coach; San Francisco 49ers (1978) Tight ends coach & special teams coordinator; Cincinnati Bengals (1979–1980) Tight ends coach & special teams coordinator; Kansas City Chiefs (1981–1982) Tight ends coach & special teams coordinator; Philadelphia Eagles (1983–1985) Tight ends coach & special teams coordinator; Kansas City Chiefs (1986) Special teams coordinator; Kansas City Chiefs (1987–1988) Head coach; Detroit Lions (1989–1993) Special teams coordinator; Atlanta Falcons (1994–1996) Offensive coordinator; St. Louis Rams (1997–1999) Special teams coordinator; Jacksonville Jaguars (2000–2001) Special teams coordinator; SMU (2008) Special teams coordinator

Awards and highlights
- Super Bowl champion (XXXIV); 2× NFL Special Teams Coach of the Year (1989, 1999)

Head coaching record
- Career: 8–22–1 (.274)
- Coaching profile at Pro Football Reference

Francis van Renssalaer Gansz (November 22, 1938 – April 27, 2009) was an American football coach whose career spanned nearly 40 years. He served as the head coach for the Kansas City Chiefs of the National Football League (NFL) from 1987 to 1988, compiling a record of 8–22–1.

== Early life ==
A native of Altoona, Pennsylvania, Gansz graduated in 1960 from the United States Naval Academy, where he played college football as a center and linebacker. Gansz then served three years at the Air Force Academy in Colorado Springs, Colorado before spending seven months at Continental Airlines.

He served as a head freshman football coach at Colgate in 1968 before returning to Navy the following year as an assistant coach and football recruiting coordinator.

== College career ==
At the college level, Gansz served as an assistant at Colgate, Oklahoma State, SMU, Army, UCLA, and Air Force, as well as his alma mater, Navy, where he was assistant coach and football recruiting coordinator from 1969 to 1972.

On February 20, 2008, Gansz came out of retirement to join SMU as its special teams coach under head coach June Jones, with whom he had worked in Atlanta and Detroit.

== Pro career ==
In January 1986, Gansz was named assistant head coach and special teams coach for the Kansas City Chiefs. He took over as head coach of the Chiefs in January 1987 after John Mackovic was fired. In his first year, a strike-shortened season, he finished 4–11. Despite this, he was kept on as coach for the 1988 season. They proceeded to go 4–11–1, with likely the most noted moment being the suspension of back Paul Palmer for violating team policy, which came after he reportedly said he would threaten to fumble on purpose. In January 1989, Gansz was fired and replaced by Marty Schottenheimer.

Once called "the best special teams coach ever" by former NFL head coach Dick Vermeil, Gansz twice earned special teams coach of the year honors, including 1999 when he helped the St. Louis Rams to a Super Bowl victory.

He retired as an NFL coach in 2001 after coaching in the league for 24 seasons, including stops in San Francisco, Cincinnati, Philadelphia, Detroit, Atlanta and Jacksonville.

== Legacy ==
Gansz was inducted into the Western Pennsylvania Sports Hall of Fame in 1999. In 2009, the United States Naval Academy and Southern Methodist University jointly created the Gansz Trophy which is to be awarded to the winner of any football game between the two institutions. Navy won the first four trophies, winning from 2009 to 2011 and again in 2015. The teams played every year from 2015 until 2023 as members of the American Athletic Conference. In 2024, Southern Methodist University joined the Atlantic Coast Conference.

== Personal life and death ==
After retirement, he lived in Atlanta, Georgia, with his wife Barbara, though he continued to speak at colleges and clinics around the country. Gansz's son Frank Jr. was a longtime special teams coach at the college and professional levels, including working with the Chiefs and SMU.

Gansz died in Dallas on April 27, 2009, from complications following knee replacement surgery. He is interred at the United States Naval Academy Cemetery in Annapolis, Maryland.

== Head coaching record ==
Team	Year	Regular Season					Postseason			
Team	Year	Won	Lost	Ties	Win %	Finish	Won	Lost	Win %	Result
KC	1987	4	11	0	.267	5th in AFC West	–	–	–	–
KC	1988	4	11	1	.281	5th in AFC West	–	–	–	–
KC total		8	22	1	.274		–	–	–	
Total		8	22	1	.274					
