= Kevin Adkins =

American aerospace engineer

- Citizenship: United States
- Known for: Unmanned Vehicle and Atmospheric Investigation Lab (UNVAIL)
- Awards: Fellow of the Royal Aeronautical Society
- Scientific career
- Fields: Aerospace engineering, Atmospheric science
- Workplaces: Embry–Riddle Aeronautical University, United States Air Force

Kevin Adkins is an American aerospace engineer, atmospheric scientist, and professor at Embry-Riddle Aeronautical University in Daytona Beach, Florida. Following distinguished service and leadership in the industry on a variety of transformational fixed-wing and rotorcraft development projects, he was elected a Fellow of the Royal Aeronautical Society for his outstanding contributions in the profession of aeronautics. At Embry-Riddle, he is the Director of the Unmanned Vehicle and Atmospheric Investigation Lab (UNVAIL). Prior to his faculty appointment, Adkins served in the United States Air Force and worked in industry as both a lead aircraft design and flight test engineer.

== Early life and education ==
Kevin A. Adkins was born in Ann Arbor, Michigan. His fascination with flight and love of the outdoors resulted in him building various air, land and sea vehicles during his teenage years and completing a pilot certificate at the age of 17. These experiences propelled him to undertake studies in aerospace engineering and atmospheric science. He received his BS and MEng in aerospace engineering from the University of Michigan and his PhD aerospace engineering Mississippi State University.

== Research ==
Adkins research focuses on boundary layer meteorology, design and applications of uncrewed aircraft systems, and advanced air mobility.
