= Jerry Reese (defensive back) =

American football player (born 1955)

No. 31
- Position: Defensive back

Personal information
- Born: January 7, 1955 (age 71); New Orleans, Louisiana, U.S.
- Listed height: 6 ft 3 in (1.91 m)
- Listed weight: 192 lb (87 kg)

Career information
- High school: St. Augustine (New Orleans)
- College: Oklahoma
- NFL draft: 1977: undrafted

Career history
- New Orleans Saints (1977)*; Denver Broncos (1978)*; Kansas City Chiefs (1979–1980)
- * Offseason or practice squad member only
- Stats at Pro Football Reference

Jerry Louis Reese (born January 7, 1955) is an American former professional football player who was a defensive back for the Kansas City Chiefs of the National Football League (NFL). He played college football for the Oklahoma Sooners. Reese also had stints with the New Orleans Saints and Denver Broncos but played with neither.
