= Chris Smith (running back, born 1963) =

American football player (born 1963)

No. 47
- Position: Running back

Personal information
- Born: June 1, 1963 (age 63); Cincinnati, Ohio, U.S.
- Listed height: 6 ft 1 in (1.85 m)
- Listed weight: 232 lb (105 kg)

Career information
- High school: La Salle (Cincinnati)
- College: Notre Dame (1981–1984)
- NFL draft: 1985: undrafted

Career history
- Kansas City Chiefs (1985–1987)

Career NFL statistics
- Rushing yards: 114
- Rushing average: 4.4
- Receptions: 2
- Receiving yards: 21
- Stats at Pro Football Reference

Christopher Montane Smith (born June 1, 1963) is an American former professional football player who was a running back for two seasons with the Kansas City Chiefs of the National Football League (NFL). He played college football for the Notre Dame Fighting Irish.

== Early life ==
Christopher Montane Smith was born on June 1, 1963, in Cincinnati, Ohio. He attended La Salle High School in Cincinnati.

== College career ==
Smith played for the Notre Dame Fighting Irish of the University of Notre Dame from 1981 to 1984. He rushed 41 times for 161 yards and one touchdown his freshman year in 1981. In 1982, he totaled one carry for four yards, and two catches for 11 yards and two touchdowns. Smith recorded 77 rushing attempts for 421 yards and one touchdown in 1983 while also catching 13 passes for 142 yards and one touchdown. As a senior in 1984, he recorded 61 carries for 260 yards, and nine receptions for 67 yards.

== Professional career ==
Smith was selected by the Jacksonville Bulls in the 13th round, with the 177th overall pick, of the 1985 USFL draft. He went undrafted in the 1985 NFL draft and signed with the Kansas City Chiefs on May 6, 1985. He was released on September 2, 1985, and later re-signed with the Chiefs on April 14, 1986. Smith played in one game for the Chiefs during the 1986 season before being placed on injured reserve on September 12, 1986. He was released on August 3, 1987. On September 23, Smith signed with the Chiefs during the 1987 NFL players strike. He started all three strike games for the Chiefs, rushing 26 times for 114 yards while also catching two passes for 21 yards. He was released on October 19, 1987, after the strike ended.

== Personal life ==
Smith later graduated from Baker University with a Master’s in Business Administration. He was also an account executive for T-Mobile. He suffered a spinal cord injury in 2023.
