= Mark Nelson (offensive lineman) =

American football player (born 1964)

No. 70
- Position: Offensive tackle

Personal information
- Born: June 22, 1964 (age 62); Grand Forks, North Dakota, U.S.
- Listed height: 6 ft 4 in (1.93 m)
- Listed weight: 270 lb (122 kg)

Career information
- High school: Thomas Jefferson
- College: Normanale CC; Iowa State; Bowling Green
- NFL draft: 1987: undrafted

Career history
- Kansas City Chiefs (1987)

Career NFL statistics
- Games played: 1
- Stats at Pro Football Reference

Mark David Nelson (born June 22, 1964) is an American former professional football player who was an offensive tackle for the Kansas City Chiefs of the National Football League (NFL). He played college football at three different places, beginning at Normandale Community College before transferring to the Iowa State Cyclones and Bowling Green Falcons programs.

Nelson played just one game in his career as a replacement player during the 1987 NFL strike.

After his short career he worked at Toledo Hospital (1988–1992), Muskingum College (1992–1995), Utah State University (1995–2000), and University of Colorado at Boulder (2000–2005), before being hired by the University of Minnesota as the Director of Intercollegiate Academic Counseling and Student Services.
