= Byron Ingram =

American football player (born 1964)

No. 60
- Position: Guard

Personal information
- Born: November 17, 1964 (age 61); Lexington, Kentucky, U.S.
- Listed height: 6 ft 5 in (1.96 m)
- Listed weight: 295 lb (134 kg)

Career information
- High school: Henry Clay
- College: Eastern Kentucky
- NFL draft: 1987: undrafted

Career history
- Kansas City Chiefs (1987–1988)
- Stats at Pro Football Reference

Byron Kimble Ingram (born November 17, 1964) is an American former professional football player who was a guard for the Kansas City Chiefs of the National Football League (NFL). He played college football for the Eastern Kentucky Colonels.
