= Bob Harris (American football) =

American football player (born 1960)

No. 50, 92
- Position: Linebacker

Personal information
- Born: November 11, 1960 (age 65); Everett, Washington, U.S.
- Listed height: 6 ft 2 in (1.88 m)
- Listed weight: 219 lb (99 kg)

Career information
- High school: Cedar Grove (Ellenwood, Georgia)
- College: Auburn
- NFL draft: 1983: 8th round, 211th overall pick

Career history
- St. Louis Cardinals (1983–1986); Kansas City Chiefs (1987)

Awards and highlights
- 2× Second-team All-SEC (1981, 1982)
- Stats at Pro Football Reference

Robert Huel Harris (born November 11, 1960) is an American former professional football linebacker who played in the National Football League (NFL) with the St. Louis Cardinals and Kansas City Chiefs. He played college football for the Auburn Tigers and was selected by the Cardinals in the eighth round of the 1983 NFL draft.

== Early life ==
Robert Huel Harris was born on November 11, 1960, in Everett, Washington. He attended Cedar Grove High School in Ellenwood, Georgia.

== College career ==
Harris enrolled at Auburn University play college football for the Tigers. He was a four-year starter at strong safety. He was a letterman in 1978, 1979, 1981, and 1982. Harris missed the 1980 season due to injury. He was named second-team All-SEC by the Associated Press for both the 1981 and 1982 seasons. He finished his college career with 11 interceptions for 67 yards.

== Professional career ==
Harris was selected by the St. Louis Cardinals in the eighth round, with the 211th overall pick, of the 1983 NFL draft. He signed with the team on June 7. He was moved to linebacker during training camp. With E. J. Junior suspended four games due to cocaine use, Harris opened the 1983 season as the team's starting outside linebacker. After Junior's suspension ended, Junior was moved to inside linebacker. Harris started eight games as a rookie in 1983, recording three interception for ten yards and one sack, before being placed on injured reserve on November 9, 1983. Harris appeared in all 16 games, starting three, during the 1984 season and posted two sacks. He was placed on injured reserve again on August 19, 1985, but later activated on October 18. He then played in ten games during the 1985 season in a reserve role. Harris was placed on injured reserve for the third time on August 28, 1986, and later released on October 31, 1986.

Harris signed with the Kansas City Chiefs on February 12, 1987. He was released on August 31 but re-signed on September 23, during the 1987 NFL players strike. He remained with the team after the strike ended. Harris started three games for the Chiefs during the 1987 season, and returned a blocked punt 23 yards for a touchdown, before being released on November 3, 1987.
