= James Harvey (offensive lineman) =

American football player (born 1965)

No. 64
- Position: Offensive lineman

Personal information
- Born: November 27, 1965 (age 60); New Orleans, Louisiana, U.S.
- Listed height: 6 ft 3 in (1.91 m)
- Listed weight: 265 lb (120 kg)

Career information
- High school: Columbia (Columbia, Mississippi)
- College: Jackson State (1983–1986)
- NFL draft: 1987: undrafted

Career history
- Kansas City Chiefs (1987–1988); Atlanta Falcons (1989)*
- * Offseason or practice squad member only
- Stats at Pro Football Reference

James M. Harvey (born November 27, 1965) is an American former professional football player who was an offensive lineman for two seasons with the Kansas City Chiefs of the National Football League (NFL). He played college football for the Jackson State Tigers. He was also a member of the Atlanta Falcons.

== Early life and college ==
James M. Harvey was born on November 27, 1965, in New Orleans, Louisiana. He attended Columbia High School in Columbia, Mississippi. He helped Columbia win the state title in 1982.

Harvey was a member of the Jackson State Tigers from 1983 to 1986.

== Professional career ==
After going undrafted in the 1987 NFL draft Harvey signed with the Kansas City Chiefs on May 6. He was released on August 3. On September 25, he was re-signed by the Chiefs during the 1987 NFL players strike. Harvey started all three strike games for the Chiefs before being released on October 20, after the strike ended. He signed a futures contract with the Chiefs on November 6, 1987. He was released on August 30, 1988. Harvey was re-signed on September 28 and played in one game for the Chiefs that season before being released for the final time on October 11, 1988.

Harvey was signed by the Atlanta Falcons on February 24, 1989. He was released on August 21, 1989.

== Post-playing career ==
Harvey later worked in the Columbia School District and was the 2015 Columbia School District Teacher of the Year. In 2015, he was named the head coach at his alma mater, Columbia High School.
