= Eric Brown (wide receiver) =

American football player (born 1964)

No. 86
- Position: Wide receiver

Personal information
- Born: September 7, 1964 (age 62)
- Listed height: 6 ft 2 in (1.88 m)
- Listed weight: 180 lb (82 kg)

Career information
- College: Tulsa
- NFL draft: 1987: undrafted

Career history
- St. Louis Cardinals (1987)*; Kansas City Chiefs (1987)
- * Offseason or practice squad member only

Career NFL statistics
- Receptions: 5
- Receiving yards: 69
- Stats at Pro Football Reference

Eric Brown (born September 7, 1964) is an American former professional football player who was a wide receiver for the Kansas City Chiefs of the National Football League (NFL). He played college football for the Tulsa Golden Hurricane.
