= Jack Epps (American football) =

American football player (born 1963)

No. 25
- Position: Defensive back

Personal information
- Born: March 20, 1963 (age 63); Tulsa, Oklahoma, U.S.
- Listed height: 6 ft 0 in (1.83 m)
- Listed weight: 197 lb (89 kg)

Career information
- High school: Shawnee Mission West
- College: Kansas State
- NFL draft: 1986: undrafted

Career history
- Kansas City Chiefs (1986); Tampa Bay Buccaneers (1987)*; Kansas City Chiefs (1987)
- * Offseason or practice squad member only
- Stats at Pro Football Reference

Jack Epps (born March 20, 1963) is an American former professional football player who played defensive back for one season for the Kansas City Chiefs.
