= Doug Hoppock =

American football player (born 1960)

No. 79
- Position: Tackle

Personal information
- Born: January 30, 1960 (age 66); Wichita, Kansas, U.S.
- Listed height: 6 ft 4 in (1.93 m)
- Listed weight: 280 lb (127 kg)

Career information
- High school: Wichita Southeast
- College: Kansas State
- NFL draft: 1983: undrafted

Career history
- Kansas City Chiefs (1987)
- Stats at Pro Football Reference

Doug Hoppock is an American former professional football player who was an offensive lineman for one season with the Kansas City Chiefs of the National Football League (NFL). He played college football for the Kansas State Wildcats.
