= James Black (defensive end) =

American football player (1956–2018)

No. 69
- Position: Defensive end

Personal information
- Born: November 4, 1956; Xenia, Ohio, U.S.
- Died: December 30, 2018 (aged 62); Jefferson, Louisiana, U.S.
- Listed height: 6 ft 4 in (1.93 m)
- Listed weight: 280 lb (127 kg)

Career information
- High school: West Side Leadership Academy (Gary, Indiana)
- College: South Carolina State
- NFL draft: 1979: undrafted

Career history
- Alabama Vulcans (1979); West Virginia Rockets (1980); Calgary Stampeders (1980)*; Washington Redskins (1981)*; Kansas City Chiefs (1981)*; Toronto Argonauts (1981)*; Kansas City Chiefs (1982)*; Denver Gold (1983)*; New Orleans Saints (1983)*; Pittsburgh Maulers (1984); Kansas City Chiefs (1987)
- * Offseason or practice squad member only

Career NFL statistics
- Games played: 1
- Stats at Pro Football Reference

James R. Black III (November 4, 1956 – December 30, 2018) was an American professional football player who was a defensive end in the National Football League (NFL) and United States Football League (USFL). He played college football for the South Carolina State Bulldogs. He played in the USFL for the Pittsburgh Maulers and in the NFL as a replacement player for the Kansas City Chiefs in 1987.

== College career ==
Black played college football for the South Carolina State Bulldogs, and played with Harry Carson in 1974.

== Professional career ==
In the American Football Association, Black played with the Alabama Vulcans in 1979, and West Virginia Rockets in 1980. He signed with the Calgary Stampeders of the Canadian Football League (CFL) in 1980, and was released on June 6, 1980.

Black signed with the Washington Redskins of the NFL on May 6, 1981, but was released shortly after and signed with the Kansas City Chiefs. He was placed on injured reserve by the Chiefs during training camp on August 18, 1981. He was later waived with an injury settlement before the start of the season. Black played for the Toronto Argonauts of the Canadian Football League (CFL) in 1981.

Black re-signed with the Chiefs, but was waived on August 5, 1982. Black signed with the Denver Gold of the United States Football League (USFL) on December 22, 1982. He was released on February 4, 1983. He signed with the New Orleans Saints of the NFL on May 5, 1983, and was released on August 9, 1983. Black signed with the Pittsburgh Maulers of the USFL on October 5, 1983. He was released on March 4, 1984.

Black signed with the Kansas City Chiefs as a replacement player during the 1987 NFL season on September 23, 1987. He suffered a knee sprain and was placed on injured reserve on October 9.

== Personal ==
Black died on December 30, 2018, due to congestive heart failure.
