= Lee Getz =

American football player (born 1964)

No. 73, 71
- Position: Guard

Personal information
- Born: April 2, 1964 (age 62); Hunterdon County, New Jersey, U.S.
- Listed height: 6 ft 3 in (1.91 m)
- Listed weight: 250 lb (113 kg)

Career information
- High school: Voorhees
- College: Rutgers
- NFL draft: 1987: undrafted

Career history
- Pittsburgh Steelers (1987)*; Kansas City Chiefs (1987)
- * Offseason or practice squad member only

Awards and highlights
- Second-team All-East (1985)

Career NFL statistics
- Games played: 3
- Stats at Pro Football Reference

E. Lee Getz (born April 2, 1964) is an American former professional football player who was a guard for the Kansas City Chiefs in the National Football League (NFL). He played college football for the Rutgers Scarlet Knights.

Raised in Glen Gardner, New Jersey, Getz played prep football at Voorhees High School, where he also won the state heavyweight wrestling title.
