= John Trahan =

American football player (born 1961)

No. 83
- Position: Wide receiver

Personal information
- Born: April 19, 1961 (age 65); Grand Forks, North Dakota, U.S.
- Listed height: 5 ft 9 in (1.75 m)
- Listed weight: 160 lb (73 kg)

Career information
- High school: Thomas Jefferson (Denver, Colorado)
- College: CSU Pueblo
- NFL draft: 1985: undrafted

Career history
- Denver Broncos (1985)*; Kansas City Chiefs (1987)
- * Offseason or practice squad member only

Career NFL statistics
- Games played: 3
- Receptions: 4
- Receiving yards: 40
- Stats at Pro Football Reference

John Trahan (born April 19, 1961) is an American former professional football player who was a wide receiver for the Kansas City Chiefs of the National Football League (NFL). He played college football for the CSU Pueblo ThunderWolves.
