= James Hamrick =

American football player (born 1963)

No. 4
- Position: Placekicker

Personal information
- Born: August 31, 1963 (age 63); Jacksonville, Florida, U.S.
- Listed height: 5 ft 11 in (1.80 m)
- Listed weight: 177 lb (80 kg)

Career information
- High school: Angleton
- College: Rice
- NFL draft: 1986: undrafted

Career history
- San Diego Chargers (1986)*; Kansas City Chiefs (1987)
- * Offseason or practice squad member only
- Stats at Pro Football Reference

James McNeil Hamrick (born August 31, 1963) is an American former professional football placekicker who played for the Kansas City Chiefs of the National Football League (NFL). He played college football for the Rice Owls. He was named to the 1986 Senior Bowl.
