= Garcia Lane =

American football player (born 1961)

No. 41, 48
- Position: Defensive back

Personal information
- Born: December 31, 1961 (age 64); Youngstown, Ohio, U.S.
- Listed height: 5 ft 9 in (1.75 m)
- Listed weight: 180 lb (82 kg)

Career information
- High school: Youngstown (OH) South
- College: Ohio State
- Supplemental draft: 1984: 3rd round

Career history
- Philadelphia Stars (1984); Baltimore Stars (1985); Kansas City Chiefs (1985, 1987)

Awards and highlights
- First-team All-Big Ten (1983)
- Stats at Pro Football Reference

Garcia Lane (born December 31, 1961) is an American former professional football player who was a defensive back in the National Football League (NFL). He was selected by the Kansas City Chiefs in the third round of the 1984 Supplemental Draft. He played for the Chiefs in 1985 and 1987.
