= Jeff Colter =

American football player (born 1961)

No. 43, 48
- Position: Defensive back

Personal information
- Born: April 23, 1961 (age 65); Tucson, Arizona, U.S.
- Listed height: 5 ft 10 in (1.78 m)
- Listed weight: 171 lb (78 kg)

Career information
- High school: Amphitheater (Tucson)
- College: Kansas (1980–1983)
- NFL draft: 1984: undrafted

Career history
- Minnesota Vikings (1984); Kansas City Chiefs (1987)
- Stats at Pro Football Reference

Jeffrey Colter (born April 23, 1961) is an American former professional football defensive back who played two seasons in the National Football League (NFL) with the Minnesota Vikings and Kansas City Chiefs. He played college football at Kansas.

== Early life and college ==
Jeffrey Colter was born on April 23, 1961, in Tucson, Arizona, and attended Amphitheater High School in Tucson. He played college football for the Kansas Jayhawks from 1980 to 1983, and was a three-year letterman from 1981 to 1983. He recorded one interception in 1981 and finished third in the Big Eight Conference with six interceptions in 1983.

== Professional career ==
After going undrafted in the 1984 NFL draft, Colter signed with the Minnesota Vikings on June 21, 1984. He played in all 16 games for the Vikings during the 1984 season. He was released on August 21, 1985.

He signed with the Kansas City Chiefs during the 1987 NFL players strike on September 23, 1987. He appeared in one game for the Chiefs before being released on October 19, 1987.

== Personal life ==
His great nephew, Kain Colter, was also a member of the Vikings.
