= Paul Palmer (American football) =

American football player (born 1964)

No. 26, 25, 6
- Position: Running back

Personal information
- Born: October 14, 1964 (age 62); Bethesda, Maryland, U.S.
- Listed height: 5 ft 9 in (1.75 m)
- Listed weight: 184 lb (83 kg)

Career information
- High school: Winston Churchill (Potomac, Maryland)
- College: Temple
- NFL draft: 1987: 1st round, 19th overall pick

Career history
- Kansas City Chiefs (1987–1988); Detroit Lions (1989); Dallas Cowboys (1989); Cincinnati Bengals (1990)*; Barcelona Dragons (1991); Philadelphia Eagles (1991)*; Toronto Argonauts (1991); Barcelona Dragons (1992)
- * Offseason or practice squad member only

Awards and highlights
- NFL All-rookie team (1987); NFL kickoff return yards leader (1987); Unanimous All-American (1986); Second-team All-American (1985); ECAC Player of the Year (1985); ECAC Rookie of the Year (1983); 4× First-team All-East (1983–1986); 2× All-ECAC (1985, 1986)

Career NFL statistics
- Rushing yards: 1,053
- Rushing average: 3.9
- Receptions: 74
- Receiving yards: 731
- Total touchdowns: 10
- Stats at Pro Football Reference
- College Football Hall of Fame

Paul Woodrow Palmer (born October 14, 1964) is an American former professional football player who was a running back in the National Football League (NFL) for the Kansas City Chiefs, Detroit Lions and Dallas Cowboys. He also was a member of the Barcelona Dragons in the World League of American Football (WLAF). He played college football for the Temple Owls.

== Early life ==
Palmer attended Churchill High School in Potomac, Maryland. He was a versatile running back and led the state in kickoff returns as a senior.

Paul accepted a football scholarship from Temple University, to play under head coach Bruce Arians. As a freshman he was a backup that struggled with ball security. He registered 141 carries for 628 yards (4.5-yard average), 6 rushing touchdowns, 33 receptions for 271 yards and 2 touchdowns.

As a sophomore, Palmer replaced the injured starter Brian Slade at running back against Boston College, making 11 carries for 98 yards. The next game against the University of Cincinnati, he registered 92 rushing yards. His first start came against the University of Delaware, collecting 144 rushing yards. He posted 182 carries for 885 yards (4.9/yard average), 9 touchdowns, 29 receptions for 197 yards and one touchdown.

As a junior, he became one of the top running backs in the nation, recording 275 carries for 1,516 yards, 9 touchdowns, 13 receptions for 131 yards and one touchdown. Against Penn State, he rushed for 206 yards.

As a senior in 1986, Palmer led the Division I in rushing yards (1,866) and all-purpose yards (2,633), breaking Marcus Allen's single-season all-purpose yardage NCAA record. He also registered 346 carries and 15 touchdowns. Against East Carolina University, he tallied 349 rushing yards (school record), 3 touchdowns and tied the single-game record for all-purpose yards with 417. In his next three games he rushed for 239, 187, and 212 yards respectively, setting NCAA records for rushing yards in consecutive games, three straight contests and four consecutive games. Paul was the runner-up to Vinny Testaverde for the 1986 Heisman Trophy award, even though Temple did not have nationally televised games.

In July 1988, it emerged that Palmer had signed with agent Norby Walters before his eligibility expired (he received monthly payments and a $5,000 loan). Temple forfeited all six of its wins from the 1986 season, erased all of Palmer's records from the books, and withdrew all of Palmer's athletic prizes and rewards. School president Peter Liacouras also ordered Palmer to reimburse Temple for his senior year scholarship. In a deal with federal prosecutors who were investigating Walters, Palmer agreed to perform 150 to 250 hours of community service. Years later, the school decided to recognize Palmer’s 1986 season, after he showed remorse for his decisions and their effects on Temple.

During Palmers college career he ranked sixth in NCAA Division I history in rushing yards and fourth in all-purpose yards, setting 23 school records including career rushing yards (4,895), career rushing attempts (944), career all-purpose yards (6,613), career rushing touchdowns (39), career 100-yard games (21), career 200-yard games (6) and points (264).

In 2000, Palmer was inducted into the Temple Athletics Hall of Fame. On January 8, 2018, he was elected to the College Football Hall of Fame, becoming the first player from Temple to receive such an honor.

== Professional career ==
Pre-draft measurables
Height	Weight	Arm length	Hand span	40-yard dash	10-yard split	20-yard split	20-yard shuttle	Vertical jump	Broad jump	Bench press
5 ft 9 1/4 in (1.76 m)	184 lb (83 kg)	29 3/4 in (0.76 m)	9 3/4 in (0.25 m)	4.53 s	1.57 s	2.63 s	4.22 s	30.0 in (0.76 m)	9 ft 8 in (2.95 m)	11 reps
All values from NFL Combine

=== Kansas City Chiefs ===
Palmer was selected by the Kansas City Chiefs in the first round (19th overall) of the 1987 NFL draft. His great-grandmother Frances Palmer who raised him since he was 2 years old, died the day he was selected and Paul chose to spend the day with his family. As a rookie, Palmer was mostly used on special teams, leading the AFC in kickoff return average (24.3 yards per attempt). He was named to the NFL's All-Rookie Team, and was named NFL All-Pro as a kick returner.

In 1988, through the first six weeks Paul led the team in rushing, receiving, scoring and combined yards from scrimmage. He would later have clashes with the coaching staff and not be able to take over the starting running back position from Christian Okoye. On September 4, 1989, Palmer was waived by new head coach Marty Schottenheimer. He rushed for 607 yards in two seasons.

=== Detroit Lions ===
On September 5, 1989, Palmer was claimed off waivers by the Detroit Lions, reuniting with Frank Gansz who was his head coach with the Chiefs. On October 16, after five games without a single rushing attempt and 11 kickoff returns for 255 yards, he was traded to the Dallas Cowboys, in exchange for an eighth round draft choice (#194-Willie Green).

=== Dallas Cowboys ===
In 1989, he became the starting running back after Herschel Walker was traded to the Minnesota Vikings. Palmer led the Cowboys with 446 yards on 112 carries during 9 games, on a team that would finish with a 1–15 record for the 1989 season, and that had the second lowest 16-game rushing total in franchise history (after the 2012 season), with quarterback Troy Aikman as the team's second-leading rusher with 302 yards. Palmer played a key role in the only win the team had that season (against Washington), when Paul registered the only 100-yard rushing game of his career, after gaining 110 yards and scoring a touchdown.

=== Cincinnati Bengals ===
On March 30, 1990, the Cincinnati Bengals signed him in Plan B free agency. Palmer led the team in kickoff return yardage during the preseason (5 kick returns for an average of 23 yards, including a 49-yarder against Atlanta). He was released on August 20.

=== Barcelona Dragons (first stint) ===
In 1991, he was drafted by the Barcelona Dragons of the World League of American Football. During the first 4 games Palmer was the league's second leading rusher, but a hamstring injury limited him to just 39 yards the rest of the season. He finished as the team's second leading-rusher behind Jim Bell, recording 358 yards and 3 touchdowns.

=== Philadelphia Eagles ===
On June 27, 1991, Paul was signed as a free agent by the Philadelphia Eagles. He was released on August 5.

=== Barcelona Dragons (second stint) ===
In 1992, Palmer finished his professional career in the World League of American Football with the Barcelona Dragons. He was the Dragons starting running back, tallying 259 total rushing yards.

== Personal life ==
Palmer spent 12 seasons as an assistant football coach at Haddon Heights High School. He is currently a radio analyst for Temple football games.

== See also ==
- List of college football yearly rushing leaders
