= Tony Holloway =

American football player (1964–2019)

No. 97
- Position: Defensive end

Personal information
- Born: April 21, 1964; San Juan, Puerto Rico
- Died: November 4, 2019 (aged 55)
- Listed height: 6 ft 2 in (1.88 m)
- Listed weight: 222 lb (101 kg)

Career information
- High school: West (Bellevue, Nebraska)
- College: Nebraska (1982–1986)
- NFL draft: 1987: undrafted

Career history
- Cleveland Browns (1987)*; Kansas City Chiefs (1987)
- * Offseason or practice squad member only

Career NFL statistics
- Games played: 1
- Stats at Pro Football Reference

Anthony Lambert Holloway (April 21, 1964 – November 4, 2019) was an American professional football player. A defensive end, he played college football for the Nebraska Cornhuskers from 1982 to 1986 and later one season in the National Football League (NFL) for the Kansas City Chiefs. He was also a member of the Cleveland Browns. Holloway was the first Puerto Rican-born NFL player.

== Early life ==
Holloway was born on April 21, 1964, in San Juan, Puerto Rico, and his father was a member of the United States Air Force. His family later moved to Nebraska, where he grew up. Holloway started playing football from a young age and attended Bellevue West High School, where he played as a defensive end. As a high school senior, he was named Class A first-team all-state (Note: Referring to selection as one of the best players at his position in the state in the Class A division.) despite missing several games after tearing his ankle ligaments. Holloway was invited to the Nebraska Shrine Bowl at the conclusion of his high school career and received several votes for outstanding defensive player at the game. He accepted a scholarship offer to play college football for the Nebraska Cornhuskers.

== College career ==
Holloway began his collegiate career as a linebacker in 1982. In 1983, he served as a second-string linebacker and earned a varsity letter, being part of a Nebraska team that compiled a record of 12–1, with their only loss in the 1984 Orange Bowl, and ranked second nationally. Holloway redshirted during the 1984 season and switched from playing linebacker to defensive end. Entering the 1985 season, he was regarded as both the fastest and strongest defensive end on the Cornhuskers. Holloway, who stood at 6 feet 2 inches (1.88 m) and weighed 205 pounds (93 kg), was able to bench press 370 pounds (170 kg) and run the 40-yard dash in 4.67 seconds (later improved to 4.63 seconds by his senior year). That year, he described his speed and quickness as his top skill.

Holloway was a part-time starter during the 1985 season and was named Big Eight Conference defensive player of the week after posting nine tackles and four tackles-for-loss in a 38–7 win against the New Mexico Lobos. He helped the 1985 Cornhuskers to a record of 9–3 with an appearance in the 1986 Fiesta Bowl. Holloway opened the 1986 season as starting defensive end. He helped Nebraska to a record of 10–2 and a victory in the 1987 Sugar Bowl, although Brad Tyrer took over as starter from Holloway mid-season. During Holloway's five years in college, the Cornhuskers won at least nine games each year and won three bowl games. He graduated with a Bachelor of Science in computer science with a minor in physics.

== Professional career ==
After not being selected in the 1987 NFL draft, Holloway signed with the Cleveland Browns as an undrafted free agent. He was released (Note: Contract terminated.) on August 9, 1987. On September 23 of that year, after the NFL Players Association went on strike, Holloway signed with the Kansas City Chiefs as a replacement player. He appeared in one game as a starter but was later released. Holloway became the first-ever Puerto Rican-born NFL player. He did not sign with any other team afterwards; his professional career was derailed by a knee injury suffered during his time with the Chiefs.

== Personal life ==
Holloway received a Master of Business Administration and a Master of Project Management from Keller Graduate School of Management. He operated a computer consulting business and worked for American International Group, GE Capital and Harman International. Holloway also was a teacher at ITT Technical Institute. With his wife, Carol, he had three children. Holloway died on November 4, 2019, at the age of 55.
