= Teddy Nelson (American football) =

American football player (born 1965)

No. 49
- Position: Defensive back

Personal information
- Born: January 1, 1965 (age 61); Pittsburgh, Pennsylvania, U.S.
- Listed height: 5 ft 10 in (1.78 m)
- Listed weight: 203 lb (92 kg)

Career information
- High school: Peabody (Pittsburgh)
- College: UNLV
- NFL draft: 1987: undrafted

Career history
- Kansas City Chiefs (1987)

Career NFL statistics
- Fumble recoveries: 1
- Stats at Pro Football Reference

Theodore R. Nelson III (born January 1, 1965) is an American former professional football player who was a defensive back for the Kansas City Chiefs of the National Football League (NFL). He played college football for the UNLV Rebels.

Nelson was one of the replacement players during the 1987 NFL strike.
