= Stein Koss =

American football player born in 1963

No. 80
- Position: Tight end

Personal information
- Born: August 21, 1963 (age 63); Durango, Colorado, U.S.
- Listed height: 6 ft 2 in (1.88 m)
- Listed weight: 225 lb (102 kg)

Career information
- High school: Durango
- College: Arizona State
- NFL draft: 1987: undrafted

Career history
- Kansas City Chiefs (1987)
- Stats at Pro Football Reference

Stein Jeffrey Koss (born August 21, 1963) is an American former professional football player who was a tight end for the Kansas City Chiefs of the National Football League (NFL). He played college football for Arizona State University.
