= Robert Parker (American football) =

American football player (born 1963)

No. 43
- Position: Running back

Personal information
- Born: January 7, 1963 (age 63); Alexander City, Alabama, U.S.
- Listed height: 6 ft 1 in (1.85 m)
- Listed weight: 201 lb (91 kg)

Career information
- High school: Benjamin Russell (Alexander City)
- College: Northeastern Oklahoma A&M College; BYU
- NFL draft: 1987: undrafted

Career history
- Kansas City Chiefs (1987–1988)
- Stats at Pro Football Reference

Robert Lewis Parker (born January 7, 1963) is an American former professional football player who was a running back for the Kansas City Chiefs of the National Football League (NFL). After attending junior college at Northeastern Oklahoma A&M College, he played college football for the BYU Cougars.
