= Gary Spann =

American football player (born 1963)

No. 94
- Position: Linebacker

Personal information
- Born: February 3, 1963 (age 63); Dallas, Texas, U.S.
- Listed height: 6 ft 1 in (1.85 m)
- Listed weight: 218 lb (99 kg)

Career information
- High school: South Oak Cliff (Dallas)
- College: TCU
- NFL draft: 1986: 10th round, 263rd overall pick

Career history
- Green Bay Packers (1986)*; Indianapolis Colts (1987)*; Kansas City Chiefs (1987)
- * Offseason or practice squad member only

Career NFL statistics
- Games played: 2
- Stats at Pro Football Reference

Gary Lynn Spann (born February 3, 1963) is an American former professional football player.

== Education and football career ==
Spann grew up in Dallas and graduated from South Oak Cliff High School in 1981. He was recruited to play football for TCU, located in nearby Ft. Worth.

Spann was drafted as a linebacker by the NFL's Green Bay Packers in the tenth round of the 1986 NFL draft with the 263rd overall pick. He played with the Kansas City Chiefs during the 1987 NFL season.

== Controversy ==
In September 1985, his senior year, Spann was one of 7 TCU players who publicly revealed that they had received cash in exchange for signing to play football with TCU. Spann and his teammates were suspended as soon as the payments were made public. Ineligible to play (as per NCAA rules), they were removed from the team, though their scholarships were guaranteed through 1987.

Allen and two other players (who happened to also be former high school teammates) sued the university in 1985, indicating that they had thought that the payments were sanctioned by the university; their legal view was that one of the involved alumni, Richard Lowe, was a member of the TCU Board of Trustees and, therefore, seen by them as a representative of the school. Later, that trustee underlined how common such payments were by claiming that he knew of 29 blue-chip TCU players who had been paid during the tenure of one TCU coach, F.A. Dry. After the suspensions (and eventual dismissals) of those 7 players, TCU went winless throughout the 1986 conference season after having gone 8-4 the previous season.
