= Kevin Wyatt =

American football player (born 1964)

No. 30, 23
- Position: Defensive back

Personal information
- Born: March 14, 1964; Norfolk, Virginia, U.S.
- Listed height: 5 ft 10 in (1.78 m)
- Listed weight: 199 lb (90 kg)

Career information
- High school: Rockhurst (Kansas City, Missouri)
- College: Arkansas
- NFL draft: 1986: 5th round, 136th overall pick

Career history
- Miami Dolphins (1986)*; San Diego Chargers (1986); Green Bay Packers (1987)*; Kansas City Chiefs (1987)
- * Offseason or practice squad member only

Awards and highlights
- First-team All-SWC (1984)

Career NFL statistics
- Return yards: 199
- Stats at Pro Football Reference

Kevin Wyatt (born March 14, 1964) is an American former professional football player who was a defensive back in the National Football League (NFL). He played college football for the Arkansas Razorbacks and was selected 136th overall by the Miami Dolphins in the fifth round of the 1986 NFL draft. He played for the San Diego Chargers in 1986 and for the Kansas City Chiefs in 1987.
