= Doug Hudson =

American football player (born 1964)

No. 11
- Position: Quarterback

Personal information
- Born: September 11, 1964 (age 62); Memphis, Tennessee, U.S.
- Listed height: 6 ft 2 in (1.88 m)
- Listed weight: 201 lb (91 kg)

Career information
- High school: Gulf Breeze (Gulf Breeze, Florida)
- College: Nicholls State
- NFL draft: 1987: 7th round, 186th overall pick

Career history
- Kansas City Chiefs (1987); Green Bay Packers (1989)*
- * Offseason or practice squad member only

Career NFL statistics
- Passing attempts: 1
- Passing completions: 0
- Completion percentage: 0.0%
- TD–INT: 0–0
- Passing yards: 0
- Passer rating: 39.6
- Stats at Pro Football Reference

Benjamin Douglas Hudson (born September 11, 1964) is an American former professional football player who was a quarterback for the Kansas City Chiefs of the National Football League (NFL). He graduated from Gulf Breeze High School and played college football for the Nicholls State Colonels

Hudson is best known for a one-play gaffe resulting in a safety. It is the only recorded statistic of his career.

Pre-draft measurables
Height	Weight	Arm length	Hand span	40-yard dash	10-yard split	20-yard split	20-yard shuttle	Vertical jump	Broad jump
6 ft 1 3/4 in (1.87 m)	197 lb (89 kg)	29 in (0.74 m)	7 1/4 in (0.18 m)	4.86 s	1.67 s	2.81 s	4.52 s	25.0 in (0.64 m)	8 ft 9 in (2.67 m)
All values from NFL Combine

Hudson, selected by Kansas City in the 1987 NFL draft, was the last quarterback drafted by the Chiefs to start a game until Brodie Croyle started in 2007. Hudson was one of five quarterbacks to start a game for the Chiefs in 1987 following a strike by the National Football League Players Association.

Hudson played only five minutes in his only game against the Denver Broncos, and he threw one pass for an incompletion. He was tackled by the Broncos' Jim Ryan, and fumbled the hand-off in the end zone. Hudson recovered the ball but it was recorded as a safety. The next time the Chiefs had the ball, Hudson was replaced at quarterback by Matt Stevens and Hudson never played another game in the league.
