= 1978 Kansas City Chiefs season =

NFL team season

- Owner: Lamar Hunt
- General manager: Jim Schaaf
- Head coach: Marv Levy
- Home stadium: Arrowhead Stadium

Results
- Record: 4–12
- Division place: 5th AFC West
- Playoffs: Did not qualify
- All-Pros: None
- Pro Bowlers: None

The 1978 Kansas City Chiefs season was the franchise's 9th season in the National Football League, the 16th as the Kansas City Chiefs, and the 19th overall. It began with the hiring of new head coach Marv Levy, formerly of the Canadian Football League's Montreal Alouettes. With the NFL expanding its schedule to 16 games, the Chiefs finished with a 4–12 record and 5th in the AFC West.

Coach Levy's systematic restocking of a relatively barren defensive roster began with a 1978 draft class that included a pair of future Chiefs franchise hall of famers in defensive end Art Still and linebacker Gary Spani. Running back Ed Podolak, who was the club's all-time leading rusher at the time, retired in the offseason on June 15.

Perhaps Levy's most unconventional tactic in rebuilding the Chiefs was installing the Wing-T offense. "It was a situation where we took over a team that had the worst defensive record in the history of the National Football League," Levy explained. "We wanted to keep that defense off the field, so we ran the ball 60 times a game." The 1978 Chiefs team ran and ran often, posting franchise records with 663 rushing attempts and 2,986 ground yards. Levy's squad ran the ball a staggering 69 times in a 24–23 Opening Day win at Cincinnati on September 3, the most rushing attempts in an NFL contest since 1948. Five different players had 100-yard rushing games during the year, including running back Tony Reed, who finished the season with 1,053 yards to become the team's first 1,000-yard back since 1967. Despite the squad's Opening Day success, the club lost 10 of its next 11 games, including a pair of overtime decisions. However, the team showed signs of improvement with the defense recording a 23–0 shutout against San Diego on November 26 as the club concluded its first 16-game schedule with a 4–12 mark.

== Offseason ==
=== NFL draft ===
1978 Kansas City Chiefs draft
| Round | Pick | Player | Position | College | Notes |
| 1 | 2 | Art Still * | Defensive end | Kentucky | |
| 2 | 29 | Sylvester Hicks | Defensive end | Tennessee State | |
| 3 | 58 | Gary Spani | Linebacker | Kansas State | |
| 4 | 85 | Daniel Johnson | Linebacker | Tennessee State | |
| 4 | 104 | Pete Woods | Quarterback | Missouri | |
| 5 | 112 | Jerrold McRae | Wide receiver | Tennessee State | |
| 5 | 118 | Dwight Carey | Defensive tackle | Texas–Arlington | |
| 5 | 134 | Robert Woods | Wide receiver | Grambling State | |
| 7 | 168 | Ricky Odom | Cornerback | USC | |
| 7 | 184 | Bill Kellar | Wide receiver | Stanford | |
| 8 | 195 | John Henry White | Running back | Louisiana Tech | |
| 9 | 224 | Larry Brown | Offensive tackle | Miami (FL) | |
| 10 | 251 | Earl Bryant | Defensive end | Jackson State | |
| 11 | 280 | Ray Milo | Safety | New Mexico State | |
| 12 | 307 | Willie Brock | Center | Colorado | |
Made roster * Made at least one Pro Bowl during career

== Roster ==
1978 Kansas City Chiefs roster
| Quarterbacks (QB): 11 Tony Adams; 10 Mike Livingston; Running backs (RB): 39 Mark Bailey; 35 Horace Belton; 42 MacArthur Lane; 22 Ted McKnight; 21 Arnold Morgado; 34 Eddie Payton; 32 Tony Reed; Wide receivers (WR): 80 Larry Dorsey; 89 Henry Marshall; 86 J. T. Smith; Tight ends (TE): 85 Ed Beckman; 81 Tony Samuels; 88 Walter White | Offensive linemen (OL): 56 Charlie Ane C; 79 Larry Brown T; 65 Tom Condon G; 77 Charlie Getty T; 60 Matt Herkenhoff T; 58 Jack Rudnay C; 73 Bob Simmons G; 76 Rod Walters G; Defensive linemen (DL): 75 Sylvester Hicks DE; 72 Stan Johnson DE; 71 Dave Lindstrom DE; 74 Jeff Lloyd NT; 61 Don Parrish NT; 67 Art Still DE | Linebackers (LB): 54 Jimbo Elrod ILB; 52 Thomas Howard OLB; 51 Charles Jackson OLB; 64 Whitney Paul OLB; 55 Dave Rozumek ILB; 50 Clarence Sanders ILB; 59 Gary Spani ILB; Defensive backs (DB): 25 Gary Barbaro FS; 48 Ted Burgmeier SS; 44 Tim Collier CB; 46 Tim Gray SS; 24 Gary Green CB; 29 Clyde Powers FS; 18 Emmitt Thomas CB; Special teams (ST): 7 Zenon Andrusyshyn P; 3 Jan Stenerud K | Reserve: 40 Ricky Davis S (IR); 62 Darius Helton G (IR); 51 Charles Jackson LB (IR); 82 Bill Kellar WR (IR); 78 Willie Lee DE (IR); 70 Jim Nicholson T (IR); -- Pete Woods QB (IR); Rookies in italics |

== Preseason ==
| Week | Date | Opponent | Result | Record | Venue | Attendance | Recap |
|---|---|---|---|---|---|---|---|
| 1 | August 5 | at Green Bay Packers | W 17–14 | 1–0 | Lambeau Field | 54,453 | Recap |
| 2 | August 12 | Minnesota Vikings | W 17–13 | 2–0 | Arrowhead Stadium | 41,092 | Recap |
| 3 | August 20 | at New England Patriots | L 7–24 | 2–1 | Schaefer Stadium | 39,043 | Recap |
| 4 | August 26 | St. Louis Cardinals | L 7–12 | 2–2 | Arrowhead Stadium | 40,884 | Recap |

== Regular season ==
=== Schedule ===
| Week | Date | Opponent | Result | Record | Venue | Attendance | Recap |
|---|---|---|---|---|---|---|---|
| 1 | September 3 | at Cincinnati Bengals | **W** 24–23 | 1–0 | Riverfront Stadium | 41,810 | Recap |
| 2 | September 10 | Houston Oilers | **L** 17–20 | 1–1 | Arrowhead Stadium | 40,213 | Recap |
| 3 | September 17 | at New York Giants | **L** 10–26 | 1–2 | Giants Stadium | 70,546 | Recap |
| 4 | September 24 | **Denver Broncos** | **L** 17–23 (OT) | 1–3 | Arrowhead Stadium | 60,593 | Recap |
| 5 | October 1 | at Buffalo Bills | **L** 13–28 | 1–4 | Rich Stadium | 47,310 | Recap |
| 6 | October 8 | Tampa Bay Buccaneers | **L** 13–30 | 1–5 | Arrowhead Stadium | 38,201 | Recap |
| 7 | October 15 | at **Oakland Raiders** | **L** 6–28 | 1–6 | Oakland–Alameda County Coliseum | 50,759 | Recap |
| 8 | October 22 | Cleveland Browns | **W** 17–3 | 2–6 | Arrowhead Stadium | 41,157 | Recap |
| 9 | October 29 | at Pittsburgh Steelers | **L** 24–27 | 2–7 | Three Rivers Stadium | 48,185 | Recap |
| 10 | November 5 | **Oakland Raiders** | **L** 10–20 | 2–8 | Arrowhead Stadium | 75,418 | Recap |
| 11 | November 12 | at **San Diego Chargers** | **L** 23–29 (OT) | 2–9 | San Diego Stadium | 41,395 | Recap |
| 12 | November 19 | **Seattle Seahawks** | **L** 10–13 | 2–10 | Arrowhead Stadium | 35,252 | Recap |
| 13 | November 26 | **San Diego Chargers** | **W** 23–0 | 3–10 | Arrowhead Stadium | 26,248 | Recap |
| 14 | December 3 | Buffalo Bills | **W** 14–10 | 4–10 | Arrowhead Stadium | 25,781 | Recap |
| 15 | December 10 | at **Denver Broncos** | **L** 3–24 | 4–11 | Mile High Stadium | 74,149 | Recap |
| 16 | December 17 | at **Seattle Seahawks** | **L** 19–23 | 4–12 | Kingdome | 58,490 | Recap |
Note: Intra-division opponents are in **bold** text.

=== Game summaries ===
==== Week 1: at Cincinnati Bengals ====
Week 1: Kansas City Chiefs at Cincinnati Bengals – Game summary

| Quarter | 1 | 2 | 3 | 4 | Total |
|---|---|---|---|---|---|
| **Chiefs** | 7 | 10 | 7 | 0 | **24** |
| Bengals | 0 | 9 | 0 | 14 | **23** |

at Riverfront Stadium, Cincinnati, Ohio

- Date: September 3
- Game time: 1:00 p.m. EDT
- Game weather: Sunny, 75 °F (24 °C)
- Game attendance: 41,810
- Referee: Bob Frederic
- TV announcers (NBC): Jim Simpson and Paul Warfield
- Box score

Game information

**First quarter**

- KC – Tony Reed 1-yard run (Jan Stenerud kick), 1:03. Chiefs 7–0. **Drive: 18 plays, 83 yards, 9:59.**

**Second quarter**

- CIN – Don Bass fumble recovery in endzone (kick aborted), 10:38. Chiefs 7–6.
- KC – Ted McKnight 26-yard run (Jan Stenerud kick), 7:26. Chiefs 14–6. **Drive: 7 plays, 55 yards, 3:01.**
- CIN – Chris Bahr 42-yard field goal, 4:58. Chiefs 14–9. **Drive: 4 plays, –1 yard, 0:55.**
- KC – Jan Stenerud 19-yard field goal, 0:18. Chiefs 17–9. **Drive: 15 plays, 76 yards, 4:32.**

**Third quarter**

- KC – Arnold Morgado 4-yard run (Jan Stenerud kick), 8:57. Chiefs 24–9. **Drive: 10 plays, 59 yards, 4:31.**

**Fourth quarter**

- CIN – Archie Griffin 26-yard pass from John Reaves (Chris Bahr kick), 4:59. Chiefs 24–16. **Drive: 8 plays, 60 yards, 2:29.**
- CIN – Scott Perry 25-yard return of blocked punt (Chris Bahr kick), 1:49. Chiefs 24–23.

Top passers

- KC – Mike Livingston – 8/10, 67 yards
- CIN – John Reaves – 10/24, 159 yards, TD, 2 INT

Top rushers

- KC – Mark Bailey – 26 rushes, 106 yards
- CIN – Archie Griffin – 9 rushes, 50 yards

Top receivers

- KC – Walter White – 6 receptions, 57 yards
- CIN – Archie Griffin – 2 receptions, 37 yards, TD

==== Week 2: vs Houston Oilers ====
Week 2: Houston Oilers at Kansas City Chiefs – Game summary

| Quarter | 1 | 2 | 3 | 4 | Total |
|---|---|---|---|---|---|
| **Oilers** | 3 | 3 | 0 | 14 | **20** |
| Chiefs | 0 | 10 | 7 | 0 | **17** |

at Arrowhead Stadium, Kansas City, Missouri

- Date: September 10
- Game time: 1:00 p.m. CDT
- Game weather: Cloudy, 86 °F (30 °C)
- Game attendance: 40,213
- Referee: Ben Dreith
- TV announcers (NBC): Marv Albert and Ed Podolak
- Box score

Game information

**First quarter**

- HOU – Toni Fritsch 33-yard field goal, 9:53. Oilers 3–0. **Drive: 9 plays, 49 yards, 5:07.**

**Second quarter**

- HOU – Toni Fritsch 49-yard field goal, 8:51. Oilers 6–0. **Drive: 12 plays, 35 yards, 6:09.**
- KC – Jan Stenerud 41-yard field goal, 3:53. Oilers 6–3. **Drive: 9 plays, 65 yards, 4:58.**
- KC – Ted McKnight 3-yard run (Jan Stenerud kick), 1:22. Chiefs 10–6. **Drive: 5 plays, 59 yards, 1:12.**

**Third quarter**

- KC – Tony Reed 19-yard run (Jan Stenerud kick), 9:53. Chiefs 17–6. **Drive: 10 plays, 69 yards, 5:07.**

**Fourth quarter**

- HOU – Earl Campbell 1-yard run (Toni Fritsch kick), 14:23. Chiefs 17–13. **Drive: 7 plays, 53 yards, 3:43.**
- HOU – Earl Campbell 2-yard run (Toni Fritsch kick), 1:53. Oilers 20–17. **Drive: 9 plays, 65 yards, 4:34.**

Top passers

- HOU – Dan Pastorini – 7/12, 47 yards
- KC – Mike Livingston – 9/14, 60 yards, INT

Top rushers

- HOU – Earl Campbell – 22 rushes, 107 yards, 2 TD
- KC – Tony Reed – 16 rushes, 141 yards, TD

Top receivers

- HOU – Mike Barber – 1 reception, 17 yards
- KC – Tony Reed – 4 receptions, 31 yards

==== Week 3: at New York Giants ====
Week 3: Kansas City Chiefs at New York Giants – Game summary

| Quarter | 1 | 2 | 3 | 4 | Total |
|---|---|---|---|---|---|
| Chiefs | 0 | 7 | 0 | 3 | **10** |
| **Giants** | 14 | 6 | 3 | 3 | **26** |

at Giants Stadium, East Rutherford, New Jersey

- Date: September 17
- Game time: 1:00 p.m. EDT
- Game weather: Clear, 70 °F (21 °C)
- Game attendance: 70,546
- Referee: Cal Lepore
- TV announcers (NBC): Dick Enberg and Merlin Olsen
- Box score

Game information

**First quarter**

- NYG – Bobby Hammond 6-yard pass from Joe Pisarcik (Joe Danelo kick), 10:36. Giants 7–0. **Drive: 11 plays, 71 yards, 4:24.**
- NYG – Johnny Perkins 21-yard pass from Joe Pisarcik (Joe Danelo kick), 1:55. Giants 14–0. **Drive: 5 plays, 32 yards, 1:12.**

**Second quarter**

- KC – Ted McKnight 2-yard run (Jan Stenerud kick), 11:15. Giants 14–7. **Drive: 10 plays, 80 yards, 5:40.**
- NYG – Larry Csonka 1-yard run (kick blocked), 0:45. Giants 20–7. **Drive: 4 plays, 51 yards, 0:24.**

**Third quarter**

- NYG – Joe Danelo 41-yard field goal, 0:59. Giants 23–7. **Drive: 5 plays, 34 yards, 2:15.**

**Fourth quarter**

- KC – Jan Stenerud 24-yard field goal, 12:27. Giants 23–10. **Drive: 7 plays, 74 yards, 3:27.**
- NYG – Joe Danelo 40-yard field goal, 1:06. Giants 26–10. **Drive: 13 plays, 47 yards, 6:21.**

Top passers

- KC – Mike Livingston – 15/28, 171 yards, INT
- NYG – Joe Pisarcik – 15/25, 175 yards, 2 TD

Top rushers

- KC – Tony Reed – 14 rushes, 114 yards
- NYG – Doug Kotar – 10 rushes, 79 yards

Top receivers

- KC – MacArthur Lane – 6 receptions, 43 yards
- NYG – Al Dixon – 4 receptions, 73 yards

==== Week 4: vs. Denver Broncos ====
Week 4: Denver Broncos at Kansas City Chiefs – Game summary

| Quarter | 1 | 2 | 3 | 4 | OT | Total |
|---|---|---|---|---|---|---|
| **Broncos** | 7 | 3 | 7 | 0 | 6 | **23** |
| Chiefs | 7 | 3 | 7 | 0 | 0 | **17** |

at Arrowhead Stadium, Kansas City, Missouri

- Date: September 24
- Game time: 1:00 p.m. CDT
- Game weather: Clear, 83 °F (28 °C)
- Game attendance: 60,593
- Referee: Chuck Heberling
- TV announcers (NBC): Charlie Jones and Len Dawson
- Box score

Game information

**First quarter**

- DEN – Riley Odoms 42-yard pass from Craig Morton (Jim Turner kick), 12:06. Broncos 7–0. **Drive: 5 plays, 64 yards, 2:54.**
- KC – Mike Livingston 1-yard run (Jan Stenerud kick), 7:53. Tied 7–7. **Drive: 7 plays, 53 yards, 4:13.**

**Second quarter**

- DEN – Jim Turner 42-yard field goal, 1:08. Broncos 10–7. **Drive: 8 plays, 42 yards, 3:55.**
- KC – Jan Stenerud 46-yard field goal, 0:00. Tied 10–10. **Drive: 6 plays, 31 yards, 1:08.**

**Third quarter**

- KC – Tony Reed 15-yard run (Jan Stenerud kick), 8:47. Chiefs 17–10. **Drive: 4 plays, 45 yards, 2:08.**
- DEN – Larry Canada 3-yard run (Jim Turner kick), 2:56. Tied 17–17. **Drive: 10 plays, 50 yards, 5:51.**

**Fourth quarter**

- No scoring plays.

**Overtime**

- DEN – Dave Preston 1-yard run, 4:32. Broncos 23–17. **Drive: 13 plays, 60 yards, 6:43.**

Top passers

- DEN – Craig Morton – 12/21, 138 yards, TD, INT
- KC – Mike Livingston – 7/10, 89 yards, INT

Top rushers

- DEN – Larry Canada – 19 rushes, 94 yards, TD
- KC – Tony Reed – 17 rushes, 79 yards, TD

Top receivers

- DEN – Riley Odoms – 4 receptions, 60 yards, TD
- KC – Tony Reed – 4 receptions, 53 yards

==== Week 5: at Buffalo Bills ====
Week 5: Kansas City Chiefs at Buffalo Bills – Game summary

| Quarter | 1 | 2 | 3 | 4 | Total |
|---|---|---|---|---|---|
| Chiefs | 6 | 0 | 0 | 7 | **13** |
| **Bills** | 0 | 21 | 7 | 0 | **28** |

at Rich Stadium, Orchard Park, New York

- Date: October 1
- Game time: 1:00 p.m. EDT
- Game weather: Cloudy, 65 °F (18 °C)
- Game attendance: 47,310
- Referee: Gordon McCarter
- TV announcers (NBC): Marv Albert and Ed Podolak
- Box score

Game information

**First quarter**

- KC – Jan Stenerud 42-yard field goal, 6:19. Chiefs 3–0. **Drive: 4 plays, 1 yard, 0:56.**
- KC – Jan Stenerud 27-yard field goal, 1:20. Chiefs 6–0. **Drive: 6 plays, 47 yards, 3:16.**

**Second quarter**

- BUF – Bob Chandler 20-yard pass from Joe Ferguson (Tom Dempsey kick), 7:52. Bills 7–6. **Drive: 7 plays, 40 yards, 2:17.**
- BUF – Terry Miller 8-yard run (Tom Dempsey kick), 2:20. Bills 14–6. **Drive: 6 plays, 66 yards, 3:51.**
- BUF – Bob Chandler 22-yard pass from Joe Ferguson (Tom Dempsey kick), 0:49. Bills 21–6. **Drive: 2 plays, 63 yards, 0:54.**

**Third quarter**

- BUF – Curtis Brown 22-yard run (Tom Dempsey kick), 4:50. Bills 28–6. **Drive: 7 plays, 87 yards, 3:37.**

**Fourth quarter**

- KC – Ted McKnight 41-yard run (Jan Stenerud kick), 6:16. Bills 28–13. **Drive: 5 plays, 71 yards, 1:48.**

Top passers

- KC – Tony Adams – 7/12, 80 yards
- BUF – Joe Ferguson – 15/18, 210 yards, 2 TD, INT

Top rushers

- KC – MacArthur Lane – 17 rushes, 144 yards
- BUF – Terry Miller – 18 rushes, 67 yards, TD

Top receivers

- KC – Walter White – 5 receptions, 60 yards
- BUF – Bob Chandler – 7 receptions, 116 yards, 2 TD

==== Week 6: vs. Tampa Bay Buccaneers ====
Week 6: Tampa Bay Buccaneers at Kansas City Chiefs – Game summary

| Quarter | 1 | 2 | 3 | 4 | Total |
|---|---|---|---|---|---|
| **Buccaneers** | 0 | 10 | 0 | 20 | **30** |
| Chiefs | 3 | 0 | 0 | 10 | **13** |

at Arrowhead Stadium, Kansas City, Missouri

- Date: October 8
- Game time: 1:00 p.m. CDT
- Game weather: Sunny, 72 °F (22 °C)
- Game attendance: 38,201
- Referee: Gene Barth
- TV announcers (CBS): Jim Thacker and Roman Gabriel
- Box score

Game information

**First quarter**

- KC – Jan Stenerud 25-yard field goal, 13:16. Chiefs 3–0. **Drive: 4 plays, 9 yards, 1:38.**

**Second quarter**

- TB – Neil O'Donoghue 22-yard field goal, 6:02. Tied 3–3. **Drive: 9 plays, 62 yards, 4:12.**
- TB – Morris Owens 10-yard pass from Doug Williams (Neil O'Donoghue kick), 0:31. Buccaneers 10–3. **Drive: 7 plays, 80 yards, 0:45.**

**Third quarter**

- No scoring plays.

**Fourth quarter**

- KC – Jan Stenerud 30-yard field goal, 13:37. Buccaneers 10–6. **Drive: 14 plays, 62 yards, 7:23.**
- TB – Jimmy DuBose 1-yard run (kick failed, wide left), 7:09. Buccaneers 16–6. **Drive: 11 plays, 80 yards, 6:28.**
- TB – Louis Carter 3-yard run (Neil O'Donoghue kick), 4:20. Buccaneers 23–6. **Drive: 5 plays, 23 yards, 2:10.**
- KC – Henry Marshall 26-yard pass from Tony Adams (Jan Stenerud kick), 3:06. Buccaneers 23–13. **Drive: 4 plays, 24 yards, 1:00.**
- TB – Jimmy DuBose 1-yard run (Neil O'Donoghue kick), 1:58. Buccaneers 30–13. **Drive: 5 plays, 47 yards, 1:08.**

Top passers

- TB – Doug Williams – 14/23, 226 yards, TD
- KC – Tony Adams – 15/28, 136 yards, TD, 2 INT

Top rushers

- TB – Jimmy DuBose – 21 rushes, 75 yards, 2 TD
- KC – Tony Reed – 12 rushes, 42 yards

Top receivers

- TB – Larry Mucker – 3 receptions, 81 yards
- KC – Henry Marshall – 5 receptions, 89 yards, TD

==== Week 7: at Oakland Raiders ====
Week 7: Kansas City Chiefs at Oakland Raiders – Game summary

| Quarter | 1 | 2 | 3 | 4 | Total |
|---|---|---|---|---|---|
| Chiefs | 0 | 0 | 0 | 6 | **6** |
| **Raiders** | 7 | 7 | 0 | 14 | **28** |

at Oakland–Alameda County Coliseum, Oakland, California

- Date: October 15
- Game time: 1:00 p.m. PDT
- Game weather: Partly cloudy, 65 °F (18 °C)
- Game attendance: 50,759
- Referee: Fred Silva
- TV announcers (KMBC-Kansas City): Jay Randolph and Mike Haffner
- Box score

Game information

**First quarter**

- OAK – Mark van Eeghen 3-yard run (Errol Mann kick), 0:00. Raiders 7–0. **Drive: 12 plays, 70 yards, 5:58.**

**Second quarter**

- OAK – Dave Casper 4-yard pass from Ken Stabler (Errol Mann kick), 4:39. Raiders 14–0. **Drive: 4 plays, 50 yards, 2:28.**

**Third quarter**

- No scoring plays.

**Fourth quarter**

- OAK – Mark van Eeghen 1-yard run (Errol Mann kick), 7:39. Raiders 21–0. **Drive: 7 plays, 70 yards, 4:11.**
- OAK – Charlie Phillips 42-yard interception return (Errol Mann kick), 4:33. Raiders 28–0.
- KC – Larry Dorsey 16-yard pass from Tony Adams (kick blocked), 1:30. Raiders 28–6. **Drive: 8 plays, 69 yards, 2:53.**

Top passers

- KC – Tony Adams – 16/29, 133 yards, TD, INT
- OAK – Ken Stabler – 15/20, 222 yards, TD

Top rushers

- KC – Tony Reed – 12 rushes, 49 yards
- OAK – Mark van Eeghen – 20 rushes, 76 yards, 2 TD

Top receivers

- KC – Tony Reed – 7 receptions, 91 yards
- OAK – Cliff Branch – 4 receptions, 76 yards

==== Week 8: vs. Cleveland Browns ====
Week 8: Cleveland Browns at Kansas City Chiefs – Game summary

| Quarter | 1 | 2 | 3 | 4 | Total |
|---|---|---|---|---|---|
| Browns | 3 | 0 | 0 | 0 | **3** |
| **Chiefs** | 3 | 7 | 0 | 7 | **17** |

at Arrowhead Stadium, Kansas City, Missouri

- Date: October 22
- Game time: 1:00 p.m. CDT
- Game weather: Cloudy, 75 °F (24 °C)
- Game attendance: 41,157
- Referee: Jerry Markbreit
- TV announcers (NBC): Jim Simpson and Paul Warfield
- Box score

Game information

**First quarter**

- CLE – Don Cockroft 20-yard field goal, 11:06. Browns 3–0. **Drive: 7 plays, 16 yards, 3:54.**
- KC – Jan Stenerud 21-yard field goal, 3:11. Tied 3–3. **Drive: 6 plays, 24 yards, 2:10.**

**Second quarter**

- KC – Arnold Morgado 8-yard run (Jan Stenerud kick), 2:05. Chiefs 10–3. **Drive: 10 plays, 86 yards, 5:22.**

**Third quarter**

- No scoring plays.

**Fourth quarter**

- KC – Arnold Morgado 2-yard run (Jan Stenerud kick), 1:57. Chiefs 17–3. **Drive: 11 plays, 80 yards, 5:22.**

Top passers

- CLE – Brian Sipe – 7/11, 40 yards, INT
- KC – Mike Livingston – 8/13, 57 yards

Top rushers

- CLE – Mike Pruitt – 10 rushes, 57 yards
- KC – Tony Reed – 14 rushes, 97 yards

Top receivers

- CLE – Greg Pruitt – 6 receptions, 34 yards
- KC – Horace Belton – 1 receptions 22 yards

==== Week 9: at Pittsburgh Steelers ====
Week 9: Kansas City Chiefs at Pittsburgh Steelers – Game summary

| Quarter | 1 | 2 | 3 | 4 | Total |
|---|---|---|---|---|---|
| Chiefs | 3 | 0 | 14 | 7 | **24** |
| **Steelers** | 7 | 13 | 7 | 0 | **27** |

at Three Rivers Stadium, Pittsburgh, Pennsylvania

- Date: October 29
- Game time: 1:00 p.m. EST
- Game weather: Sunny, 48 °F (9 °C)
- Game attendance: 48,185
- Referee: Red Cashion
- TV announcers (NBC): Jay Randolph and Paul Maguire
- Box Score

Game information

**First quarter**

- KC – Jan Stenerud 25-yard field goal, 12:39. Chiefs 3–0. **Drive: 4 plays, 4 yards, 2:00.**
- PIT – Franco Harris 1-yard run (Roy Gerela kick), 6:02. Steelers 7–3. **Drive: 13 plays, 77 yards, 6:37.**

**Second quarter**

- PIT – Franco Harris 11-yard run (Roy Gerela kick), 9:45. Steelers 14–3. **Drive: 13 plays, 83 yards, 7:12.**
- PIT – John Stallworth 23-yard pass from Terry Bradshaw (kick failed, wide right), 4:36. Steelers 20–3. **Drive: 6 plays, 42 yards, 3:16.**

**Third quarter**

- KC – Ted McKnight 14-yard run (Jan Stenerud kick), 12:17. Steelers 20–10. **Drive: 6 plays, 58 yards, 2:43.**
- KC – Tony Reed 16-yard run (Jan Stenerud kick), 10:29. Steelers 20–17. **Drive: 3 plays, 25 yards, 0:52.**
- PIT – Donnie Shell 17-yard fumble return (Roy Gerela kick), 0:27. Steelers 27–17.

**Fourth quarter**

- KC – Arnold Morgado 2-yard run (Jan Stenerud kick), 1:56. Steelers 27–24. **Drive: 9 plays, 62 yards, 3:31.**

Top passers

- KC – Mike Livingston – 15/28, 148 yards, 2 INT
- PIT – Terry Bradshaw – 7/13, 109 yards, TD, 2 INT

Top rushers

- KC – Arnold Morgado – 19 rushes, 74 yards, TD
- PIT – Franco Harris – 25 rushes, 90 yards, 2 TD

Top receivers

- KC – Tony Reed – 6 receptions, 64 yards
- PIT – Lynn Swann – 5 receptions, 80 yards

==== Week 10: vs Oakland Raiders ====
Week 10: Oakland Raiders at Kansas City Chiefs – Game summary

| Quarter | 1 | 2 | 3 | 4 | Total |
|---|---|---|---|---|---|
| **Raiders** | 0 | 7 | 0 | 13 | **20** |
| Chiefs | 0 | 0 | 3 | 7 | **10** |

at Arrowhead Stadium, Kansas City, Missouri

- Date: November 5
- Game time: 1:00 p.m. CST
- Game weather: Overcast, 69 °F (21 °C)
- Game attendance: 75,418
- Referee: Bob Frederic
- TV announcers (NBC): Jay Randolph and Ed Podolak
- Box score

Game information

**First quarter**

- No scoring plays.

**Second quarter**

- OAK – Raymond Chester 4-yard pass from Ken Stabler (Errol Mann kick), 8:05. Raiders 7–0. **Drive: 7 plays, 44 yards, 4:15.**

**Third quarter**

- KC – Jan Stenerud 42-yard field goal, 8:48. Raiders 7–3. **Drive: 13 plays, 45 yards, 6:12.**

**Fourth quarter**

- OAK – Arthur Whittington 25-yard run (Errol Mann kick), 11:22. Raiders 14–3. **Drive: 11 plays, 76 yards, 4:59.**
- KC – Tony Reed 14-yard pass from Mike Livingston (Jan Stenerud kick), 6:49. Raiders 14–10. **Drive: 9 plays, 80 yards, 2:30.**
- OAK – Mark van Eeghen 1-yard run (kick blocked), 0:10. Raiders 20–10. **Drive: 14 plays, 75 yards, 6:39.**

Top passers

- OAK – Ken Stabler – 17/24, 182 yards, TD, 3 INT
- KC – Mike Livingston – 9/27, 107 yards, TD, 3 INT

Top rushers

- OAK – Arthur Whittington – 26 rushes, 134 yards, TD
- KC – Arnold Morgado – 16 rushes, 54 yards

Top receivers

- OAK – Dave Casper – 7 receptions, 112 yards
- KC – Tony Reed – 4 receptions, 38 yards, TD

==== Week 11: at San Diego Chargers ====
Week 11: Kansas City Chiefs at San Diego Chargers – Game summary

| Quarter | 1 | 2 | 3 | 4 | OT | Total |
|---|---|---|---|---|---|---|
| Chiefs | 0 | 6 | 7 | 10 | 0 | **23** |
| **Chargers** | 6 | 7 | 7 | 3 | 6 | **29** |

at San Diego Stadium, San Diego, California

- Date: November 12
- Game time: 1:00 p.m. PST
- Game weather: Clear, 64 °F (18 °C)
- Game attendance: 41,395
- Referee: Fred Wyant
- TV announcers (NBC): Jay Randolph and Mike Haffner
- Box score

Game information

**First quarter**

- SD – Hank Bauer 1-yard run (kick blocked), 3:49. Chargers 6–0. **Drive: 9 plays, 53 yards, 5:18.**

**Second quarter**

- KC – Jan Stenerud 39-yard field goal, 8:22. Chargers 6–3. **Drive: 9 plays, 59 yards, 4:40.**
- SD – Hank Bauer 1-yard run (Rolf Benirschke kick), 1:58. Chargers 13–3. **Drive: 12 plays, 68 yards, 6:24.**
- KC – Jan Stenerud 20-yard field goal, 0:01. Chargers 13–6. **Drive: 9 plays, 58 yards, 1:57.**

**Third quarter**

- KC – Arnold Morgado 1-yard run (Jan Stenerud kick), 10:55. Tied 13–13. **Drive: 6 plays, 30 yards, 3:13.**
- SD – John Jefferson 46-yard pass from Dan Fouts (Rolf Benirschke kick), 5:09. Chargers 20–13. **Drive: 2 plays, 52 yards, 0:49.**

**Fourth quarter**

- KC – Arnold Morgado 5-yard run (Jan Stenerud kick), 5:22. Tied 20–20. **Drive: 8 plays, 37 yards, 2:55.**
- SD – Rolf Benirschke 28-yard field goal, 1:27. Chargers 23–20. **Drive: 8 plays, 59 yards, 3:55.**
- KC – Jan Stenerud 47-yard field goal, 0:02. Tied 23–23. **Drive: 8 plays, 40 yards, 1:25.**

**Overtime**

- SD – John Jefferson 14-yard pass from Dan Fouts, 0:00. Chargers 29–23. **Drive: 7 plays, 38 yards, 1:43.**

Top passers

- KC – Mike Livingston – 19/28, 224 yards
- SD – Dan Fouts – 13/20, 188 yards, 2 TD

Top rushers

- KC – Arnold Morgado – 29 rushes, 115 yards, 2 TD
- SD – Lydell Mitchell – 29 rushes, 144 yards

Top receivers

- KC – Tony Reed – 9 receptions, 91 yards
- SD – John Jefferson – 7 receptions, 130 yards, 2 TD

==== Week 12: vs. Seattle Seahawks ====
Week 12: Seattle Seahawks at Kansas City Chiefs – Game summary

| Quarter | 1 | 2 | 3 | 4 | Total |
|---|---|---|---|---|---|
| **Seahawks** | 3 | 7 | 3 | 0 | **13** |
| Chiefs | 0 | 3 | 0 | 7 | **10** |

at Arrowhead Stadium, Kansas City, Missouri

- Date: November 19
- Game time: 1:00 p.m. CST
- Game weather: Overcast, 36 °F (2 °C)
- Game attendance: 35,252
- Referee: Chuck Heberling
- TV announcers (NBC): Marv Albert and Paul Maguire
- Box score

Game information

**First quarter**

- SEA – Efrén Herrera 40-yard field goal, 0:44. Seahawks 3–0. **Drive: 8 plays, 30 yards, 2:54.**

**Second quarter**

- SEA – David Sims 10-yard run (Efrén Herrera kick), 13:56. Seahawks 10–0. **Drive: 4 plays, 35 yards, 1:01.**
- KC – Jan Stenerud 20-yard field goal, 0:04. Seahawks 10–3. **Drive: 10 plays, 77 yards, 1:49.**

**Third quarter**

- SEA – Efrén Herrera 18-yard field goal, 9:08. Seahawks 13–3. **Drive: 10 plays, 61 yards, 5:52.**

**Fourth quarter**

- KC – Ted McKnight 1-yard pass from Mike Livingston (Jan Stenerud kick), 10:09. Seahawks 13–10. **Drive: 13 plays, 86 yards, 6:15.**

Top passers

- SEA – Jim Zorn – 14/23, 142 yards
- KC – Mike Livingston – 18/33, 231 yards, TD

Top rushers

- SEA – Sherman Smith – 12 rushes, 84 yards
- KC – Tony Reed – 15 rushes, 50 yards

Top receivers

- SEA – Steve Largent – 6 receptions, 89 yards
- KC – Henry Marshall – 4 receptions, 78 yards

==== Week 13: vs. San Diego Chargers ====
Week 13: San Diego Chargers at Kansas City Chiefs – Game summary

| Quarter | 1 | 2 | 3 | 4 | Total |
|---|---|---|---|---|---|
| Chargers | 0 | 0 | 0 | 0 | **0** |
| **Chiefs** | 0 | 17 | 3 | 3 | **23** |

at Arrowhead Stadium, Kansas City, Missouri

- Date: November 26
- Game time: 1:00 p.m. CST
- Game weather: Rainy, 38 °F (3 °C)
- Game attendance: 26,248
- Referee: Ben Dreith
- TV announcers (NBC): Jay Randolph and Mike Haffner
- Box score

Game information

**First quarter**

- No scoring plays.

**Second quarter**

- KC – Jan Stenerud 32-yard field goal, 7:17. Chiefs 3–0. **Drive: 6 plays, 18 yards, 2:40.**
- KC – Henry Marshall 29-yard pass from Mike Livingston (Jan Stenerud kick), 1:42. Chiefs 10–0. **Drive: 8 plays, 67 yards, 3:09.**
- KC – Larry Dorsey 6-yard pass from Mike Livingston (Jan Stenerud kick), 0:17. Chiefs 17–0. **Drive: 7 plays, 47 yards, 0:44.**

**Third quarter**

- KC – Jan Stenerud 37-yard field goal, 11:12. Chiefs 20–0. **Drive: 4 plays, 6 yards, 1:23.**

**Fourth quarter**

- KC – Jan Stenerud 35-yard field goal, 11:36. Chiefs 23–0. **Drive: 8 plays, 30 yards, 4:05.**

Top passers

- SD – James Harris – 15/41, 164 yards, 5 INT
- KC – Mike Livingston – 13/21, 136 yards, 2 TD

Top rushers

- SD – Lydell Mitchell – 14 rushes, 58 yards
- KC – Tony Reed – 11 rushes, 104 yards

Top receivers

- SD – John Jefferson – 3 receptions, 43 yards
- KC – Henry Marshall – 2 receptions, 36 yards, TD

==== Week 14: vs. Buffalo Bills ====
Week 14: Buffalo Bills at Kansas City Chiefs – Game summary

| Quarter | 1 | 2 | 3 | 4 | Total |
|---|---|---|---|---|---|
| Bills | 0 | 7 | 3 | 0 | **10** |
| **Chiefs** | 7 | 0 | 7 | 0 | **14** |

at Arrowhead Stadium, Kansas City, Missouri

- Date: December 3
- Game time: 1:00 p.m. CST
- Game weather: Cloudy, 21 °F (−6 °C)
- Game attendance: 25,781
- Referee: Fred Silva
- TV announcers (NBC): Jay Randolph and Mike Haffner
- Box score

Game information

**First quarter**

- KC – Ted McKnight 17-yard run (Jan Stenerud kick), 3:30. Chiefs 7–0. **Drive: 7 plays, 42 yards, 3:58.**

**Second quarter**

- BUF – Frank Lewis 40-yard pass from Joe Ferguson (Tom Dempsey kick), 4:05. Tied 7–7. **Drive: 8 plays, 83 yards, 4:04.**

**Third quarter**

- BUF – Tom Dempsey 22-yard field goal, 4:22. Bills 10–7. **Drive: 15 plays, 76 yards, 8:06.**
- KC – Walter White 3-yard pass from Mike Livingston (Jan Stenerud kick), 0:00. Chiefs 14–10. **Drive: 8 plays, 58 yards, 4:22.**

**Fourth quarter**

- No scoring plays.

Top passers

- BUF – Joe Ferguson – 14/25, 207 yards, TD, 3 INT
- KC – Mike Livingston – 12/21, 99 yards, TD, INT

Top rushers

- BUF – Terry Miller – 15 rushes, 57 yards
- KC – Tony Reed – 16 rushes, 97 yards

Top receivers

- BUF – Frank Lewis – 7 receptions, 126 yards, TD
- KC – Henry Marshall – 3 receptions, 40 yards

==== Week 15: at Denver Broncos ====
Week 15: Kansas City Chiefs at Denver Broncos – Game summary

| Quarter | 1 | 2 | 3 | 4 | Total |
|---|---|---|---|---|---|
| Chiefs | 3 | 0 | 0 | 0 | **3** |
| **Broncos** | 7 | 0 | 10 | 7 | **24** |

at Mile High Stadium, Denver, Colorado

- Date: December 10
- Game time: 2:00 p.m. MST
- Game weather: Partly sunny, 35 °F (2 °C)
- Game attendance: 74,149
- Referee: Don Wedge
- TV announcers (NBC): Jay Randolph and Paul Maguire
- Box score

Game information

**First quarter**

- KC – Jan Stenerud 23-yard field goal, 7:59. Chiefs 3–0. **Drive: 7 plays, 28 yards, 3:15.**
- DEN – Lonnie Perrin 4-yard pass from Craig Morton (Jim Turner kick), 3:50. Broncos 7–3. **Drive: 8 plays, 80 yards, 4:09.**

**Second quarter**

- No scoring plays.

**Third quarter**

- DEN – Jim Turner 38-yard field goal, 8:41. Broncos 10–3. **Drive: 9 plays, 49 yards, 6:19.**
- DEN – Riley Odoms 23-yard pass from Craig Morton (Jim Turner kick), 1:34. Broncos 17–3. **Drive: 5 plays, 61 yards, 2:17.**

**Fourth quarter**

- DEN – Riley Odoms 29-yard pass from Craig Morton (Jim Turner kick), 5:32. Broncos 24–3. **Drive: 6 plays, 91 yards, 1:55.**

Top passers

- KC – Mike Livingston – 19/29, 115 yards, INT
- DEN – Craig Morton – 19/22, 283 yards, 3 TD, INT

Top rushers

- KC – Tony Reed – 13 rushes, 44 yards
- DEN – Larry Canada – 4 rushes, 61 yards

Top receivers

- KC – Walter White – 6 receptions, 31 yards
- DEN – Riley Odoms – 7 receptions, 165 yards, 2 TD

==== Week 16: at Seattle Seahawks ====
Week 16: Kansas City Chiefs at Seattle Seahawks – Game summary

| Quarter | 1 | 2 | 3 | 4 | Total |
|---|---|---|---|---|---|
| Chiefs | 3 | 7 | 7 | 2 | **19** |
| **Seahawks** | 7 | 13 | 0 | 3 | **23** |

at Kingdome, Seattle, Washington

- Date: December 17
- Game time: 1:00 p.m. PST
- Game weather: None (indoor stadium)
- Game attendance: 58,490
- Referee: Bob Frederic
- TV announcers (NBC): Jay Randolph and Ed Podolak
- Box score

Game information

**First quarter**

- SEA – Steve Largent 57-yard pass from Jim Zorn (Efrén Herrera kick), 9:15. Seahawks 7–0. **Drive: 5 plays, 90 yards, 1:35.**
- KC – Jan Stenerud 33-yard field goal, 6:16. Seahawks 7–3. **Drive: 8 plays, 31 yards, 2:47.**

**Second quarter**

- SEA – Al Hunter 1-yard run (kick blocked), 8:56. Seahawks 13–3. **Drive: 12 plays, 85 yards, 4:38.**
- SEA – Al Hunter 55-yard run (Efrén Herrera kick), 5:12. Seahawks 20–3. **Drive: 6 plays, 86 yards, 2:00.**
- KC – Arnold Morgado 1-yard run (Jan Stenerud kick), 1:58. Seahawks 20–10. **Drive: 2 plays, 1 yard, 0:23.**

**Third quarter**

- KC – Tony Reed 62-yard run (Jan Stenerud kick), 7:39. Seahawks 20–17. **Drive: 3 plays, 75 yards, 1:33.**

**Fourth quarter**

- SEA – Efrén Herrera 31-yard field goal, 6:47. Seahawks 23–17. **Drive: 11 plays, 56 yards, 5:42.**
- KC – Herman Weaver OB in end zone, forced by Ed Beckman for a Safety, 0:15. Seahawks 23–19.

Top passers

- KC – Mike Livingston – 5/19, 66 yards, 2 INT
- SEA – Jim Zorn – 18/29, 256 yards, TD, INT

Top rushers

- KC – Tony Reed – 11 rushes, 121 yards, TD
- SEA – Al Hunter – 27 rushes, 133 yards, 2 TD

Top receivers

- KC – Henry Marshall – 1 reception, 40 yards
- SEA – Steve Largent – 3 receptions, 81 yards, TD

== Standings ==
AFC West
| | W | L | T | PCT | DIV | CONF | PF | PA | STK |
|---|---|---|---|---|---|---|---|---|---|
| ^{(3)} Denver Broncos | 10 | 6 | 0 | .625 | 7–1 | 8–4 | 282 | 198 | L1 |
| Oakland Raiders | 9 | 7 | 0 | .563 | 3–5 | 5–7 | 311 | 283 | W1 |
| Seattle Seahawks | 9 | 7 | 0 | .563 | 4–4 | 6–6 | 345 | 358 | W1 |
| San Diego Chargers | 9 | 7 | 0 | .563 | 5–3 | 7–5 | 355 | 309 | W3 |
| Kansas City Chiefs | 4 | 12 | 0 | .250 | 1–7 | 4–10 | 243 | 327 | L2 |
