= 1979 Kansas City Chiefs season =

NFL team season

- Owner: Lamar Hunt
- General manager: Jim Schaaf
- Head coach: Marv Levy
- Home stadium: Arrowhead Stadium

Results
- Record: 7–9
- Division place: 5th AFC West
- Playoffs: Did not qualify
- All-Pros: 1: P Bob Grupp (2nd team)
- Pro Bowlers: 1: P Bob Grupp

The 1979 Kansas City Chiefs season was the franchise's 10th season in the National Football League, the 17th as the Kansas City Chiefs, and the 20th overall. They improved on their 4–12 record from 1978 to a 7–9 record, but a last-place finish in the AFC West. The Chiefs missed the playoffs for the eighth straight year due to the four other teams ahead of them in their division all finishing with winning records.

Kansas City owned a pair of picks in the first round of the 1979 draft, selecting defensive end Mike Bell and quarterback Steve Fuller. By the season's third game, Fuller had supplanted Mike Livingston, the last active player from the Chiefs' Super Bowl IV champiosnhip team, as the club's starter.

With Fuller at the helm, the Chiefs owned a 4–2 record after six games, but a five-game midseason losing streak ended the attempt. Despite finishing fifth in the AFC West for a second straight season, Kansas City's 7–9 record was a notable accomplishment considering the fact that the division's other four clubs all posted winning records for a second consecutive season.

The Chiefs closed the season by dropping a 3–0 decision at Tampa Bay on December 16 in one of the most water-logged contests in franchise annals. As both clubs struggled to move the ball under monsoon-like conditions (Kansas City was held to 80 total yards), a field goal late in the fourth quarter by the Buccaneers' Neil O'Donoghue averted the NFL's first scoreless tie since 1943, allowing Tampa Bay to win the NFC Central division championship after a three-game losing streak.

The Chiefs set a dubious NFL record for the season, with the fewest passing yards (1,660, 103.8 per game) in a 16-game season.

== Offseason ==
=== NFL draft ===
1979 Kansas City Chiefs draft
Round	Pick	Player	Position	College	Notes
1	2	Mike Bell	Defensive end	Colorado State	
1	23	Steve Fuller	Quarterback	Clemson	
4	85	Frank Manumaleuga	Linebacker	San Jose State	
5	112	Earl Gant	Running back	Missouri	
6	140	Spider Gaines	Wide receiver	Washington	
7	167	Ken Kremer	Defensive end	Ball State	
8	195	Mike Williams	Running back	New Mexico	
8	218	Robert Brewer	Guard	Temple	
9	222	James Folston	Tight end	Cameron	
9	229	Joe Robinson	Offensive tackle	Ohio State	
10	251	Mike DuPree	Linebacker	Florida	
10	260	Gearld Jackson	Safety	Mississippi State	
10	268	Larry Willis	Wide receiver	Alcorn State	
11	277	Stan Rome	Wide receiver	Clemson	
12	302	Michael Forrest	Running back	Arkansas	
Made roster

=== Undrafted free agents ===
1979 undrafted free agents of note
Player	Position	College
Kurt Jonker	Tackle	Augustana (South Dakota)

== Roster ==
1979 Kansas City Chiefs roster
Quarterbacks (QB): 4 Steve Fuller; 9 Bill Kenney; 10 Mike Livingston; Running backs (RB): 35 Horace Belton; 39 Ben Cowins; 23 Earl Gant; 34 Wilbert Haslip; 22 Ted McKnight; 40 Mike Williams; Wide receivers (WR): 80 Johnnie Dirden; 89 Henry Marshall; 87 Stan Rome; 86 J. T. Smith; Tight ends (TE): 84 Al Dixon; 81 Tony Samuels	Offensive linemen (OL): 56 Charlie Ane C; 79 Larry Brown T; 78 John Choma T; 65 Tom Condon G; 77 Charlie Getty T; 58 Jack Rudnay C; 73 Bob Simmons G; 76 Rod Walters G; Defensive linemen (DL): 90 Curtis Anderson DE; 99 Mike Bell DE; 75 Sylvester Hicks DE; 91 Ken Kremer NT; 61 Don Parrish NT; 67 Art Still DE	Linebackers (LB): 57 Jerry Blanton OLB; 52 Thomas Howard OLB; 51 Charles Jackson ILB; 54 Frank Manumaleuga ILB; 50 Cal Peterson OLB; 55 Dave Rozumek ILB; 59 Gary Spani ILB; Defensive backs (DB): 25 Gary Barbaro FS; 42 M. L. Carter CB; 41 Herb Christopher SS; 44 Tim Collier CB; 24 Gary Green CB; 49 Gerald Jackson SS; 20 Horace Perkins CB; Special teams (ST): 1 Bob Grupp P; 3 Jan Stenerud K	Reserve: 85 Ed Beckman TE (IR); 83 Steve Gaunty WR (IR); -- Robert Gaines WR (NF-Ill.); 60 Matt Herkenhoff T (IR); 82 Bill Kellar WR (IR); 71 Dave Lindstrom DE (IR); 21 Arnold Morgado RB (IR); 70 Jim Nicholson T (IR); 53 Whitney Paul LB (IR); 29 Clyde Powers S (IR); 32 Tony Reed RB (IR); 31 Jerry Reese S (IR); -- Joe Robinson T (IR); 88 Walter White TE (IR); Rookies in italics

== Preseason ==
Week	Date	Opponent	Result	Record	Venue	Attendance	Recap
1	August 4	at Green Bay Packers	L 10–14	0–1	Lambeau Field	53,994	Recap
2	August 9	Philadelphia Eagles	W 24–21	1–1	Arrowhead Stadium	33,378	Recap
3	August 18	St. Louis Cardinals	W 20–3	2–1	Arrowhead Stadium	43,214	Recap
4	August 23	at Minnesota Vikings	W 25–0	3–1	Metropolitan Stadium	39,578	Recap

== Regular season ==
=== Schedule ===
Week	Date	Opponent	Result	Record	Venue	Attendance	Recap
1	September 2	Baltimore Colts	**W** 14–0	1–0	Arrowhead Stadium	50,442	Recap
2	September 9	Cleveland Browns	**L** 24–27	1–1	Arrowhead Stadium	42,181	Recap
3	September 16	at Houston Oilers	**L** 6–20	1–2	Houston Astrodome	45,684	Recap
4	September 23	**Oakland Raiders**	**W** 35–7	2–2	Arrowhead Stadium	67,821	Recap
5	September 30	at **Seattle Seahawks**	**W** 24–6	3–2	Kingdome	61,169	Recap
6	October 7	at Cincinnati Bengals	**W** 10–7	4–2	Riverfront Stadium	40,041	Recap
7	October 14	**Denver Broncos**	**L** 10–24	4–3	Arrowhead Stadium	74,292	Recap
8	October 21	New York Giants	**L** 17–21	4–4	Arrowhead Stadium	44,362	Recap
9	October 28	at **Denver Broncos**	**L** 3–20	4–5	Mile High Stadium	74,908	Recap
10	November 4	**San Diego Chargers**	**L** 14–20	4–6	Arrowhead Stadium	59,353	Recap
11	November 11	Pittsburgh Steelers	**L** 3–30	4–7	Arrowhead Stadium	70,132	Recap
12	November 18	at **Oakland Raiders**	**W** 24–21	5–7	Oakland–Alameda County Coliseum	53,596	Recap
13	November 25	at **San Diego Chargers**	**L** 7–28	5–8	San Diego Stadium	50,078	Recap
14	December 2	**Seattle Seahawks**	**W** 37–21	6–8	Arrowhead Stadium	42,160	Recap
15	December 9	at Baltimore Colts	**W** 10–7	7–8	Memorial Stadium	25,684	Recap
16	December 16	at Tampa Bay Buccaneers	**L** 0–3	7–9	Tampa Stadium	63,624	Recap
Note: Intra-division opponents are in **bold** text.

=== Game summaries ===
==== Week 1: vs. Baltimore Colts ====
Week 1: Baltimore Colts at Kansas City Chiefs – Game summary

Quarter	1	2	3	4	Total
Colts	0	0	0	0	**0**
**Chiefs**	0	7	0	7	**14**

at Arrowhead Stadium, Kansas City, Missouri

- Date: September 2
- Game time: 3:00 p.m. CDT
- Game weather: Sunny, 88 °F (31 °C)
- Game attendance: 50,442
- Referee: Jerry Seeman
- TV announcers (NBC): Jay Randolph and Paul Maguire
- Box score

Game information

**First quarter**

- No scoring plays.

**Second quarter**

- KC – Ted McKnight 1-yard run (Jan Stenerud kick), 12:18. Chiefs 7–0. **Drive: 6 plays, 39 yards, 1:40.**

**Third quarter**

- No scoring plays.

**Fourth quarter**

- KC – Ted McKnight 70-yard run (Jan Stenerud kick), 8:05. Chiefs 14–0. **Drive: 3 plays, 79 yards, 1:13.**

Top passers

- BAL – Bert Jones – 14/26, 120 yards, INT
- KC – Mike Livingston – 9/18, 79 yards

Top rushers

- BAL – Joe Washington – 16 rushes, 63 yards
- KC – Ted McKnight – 10 rushes, 79 yards

Top receivers

- BAL – Joe Washington – 13 receptions, 130 yards
- KC – Ted McKnight – 4 receptions, 30 yards

==== Week 2: vs. Cleveland Browns ====
Week 2: Cleveland Browns at Kansas City Chiefs – Game summary

Quarter	1	2	3	4	Total
**Browns**	10	7	3	7	**27**
Chiefs	0	0	7	17	**24**

at Arrowhead Stadium, Kansas City, Missouri

- Date: September 9
- Game time: 3:00 p.m. CDT
- Game weather: Clear, 84 °F (29 °C)
- Game attendance: 42,181
- Referee: Jerry Markbreit
- TV announcers (NBC): Stu Nahan and Paul Maguire
- Box score

Game information

**First quarter**

- CLE – Don Cockroft 27-yard field goal, 5:17. Browns 3–0. **Drive: 10 plays, 64 yards, 4:12.**
- CLE – Reggie Rucker 17-yard pass from Brian Sipe (Don Cockroft kick), 0:44. Browns 10–0. **Drive: 7 plays, 64 yards, 1:46.**

**Second quarter**

- CLE – Ozzie Newsome 20-yard pass from Brian Sipe (Don Cockroft kick), 1:16. Browns 17–0. **Drive: 6 plays, 77 yards, 1:33.**

**Third quarter**

- CLE – Don Cockroft 32-yard field goal, 3:30. Browns 20–0. **Drive: 8 plays, 46 yards, 3:50.**
- KC – J. T. Smith 17-yard pass from Steve Fuller (Jan Stenerud kick), 0:00. Browns 20–7. **Drive: 8 plays, 47 yards, 3:30.**

**Fourth quarter**

- KC – Tony Reed 9-yard run (Jan Stenerud kick), 8:52. Browns 20–14. **Drive: 11 plays, 85 yards, 4:20.**
- KC – Ted McKnight 1-yard run (Jan Stenerud kick), 5:30. Chiefs 21–20. **Drive: 7 plays, 32 yards, 2:29.**
- KC – Jan Stenerud 30-yard field goal, 2:19. Chiefs 24–20. **Drive: 7 plays, 13 yards, 2:54.**
- CLE – Reggie Rucker 21-yard pass from Brian Sipe (Don Cockroft kick), 0:52. Browns 27–24. **Drive: 8 plays, 76 yards, 1:27.**

Top passers

- CLE – Brian Sipe – 19/35, 243 yards, 3 TD, INT
- KC – Steve Fuller – 14/25, 148 yards, TD

Top rushers

- CLE – Mike Pruitt – 14 rushes, 77 yards
- KC – Ted McKnight – 14 rushes, 44 yards

Top receivers

- CLE – Ozzie Newsome – 6 receptions, 77 yards, TD
- KC – J. T. Smith – 5 receptions, 65 yards, TD

==== Week 3: at Houston Oilers ====
Week 3: Kansas City Chiefs at Houston Oilers – Game summary

Quarter	1	2	3	4	Total
Chiefs	0	6	0	0	**6**
**Oilers**	7	10	0	3	**20**

at Houston Astrodome, Houston, Texas

- Date: September 16
- Game time: 1:00 p.m. CDT
- Game weather: None (indoor stadium)
- Game attendance: 45,684
- Referee: Chuck Heberling
- TV announcers (NBC): Charlie Jones and Len Dawson
- Box score

Game information

**First quarter**

- HOU – Earl Campbell 4-yard run (Toni Fritsch kick), 4:40. Oilers 7–0. **Drive: 3 plays, 44 yards, 1:28.**

**Second quarter**

- KC – J. T. Smith 55-yard punt return (kick blocked), 14:45. Oilers 7–6.
- HOU – Tim Wilson 24-yard pass from Gifford Nielsen (Toni Fritsch kick), 7:55. Oilers 14–6. **Drive: 5 plays, 70 yards, 2:15.**
- HOU – Toni Fritsch 28-yard field goal, 0:10. Oilers 17–6. **Drive: 7 plays, 17 yards, 0:54.**

**Third quarter**

- No scoring plays.

**Fourth quarter**

- HOU – Toni Fritsch 23-yard field goal, 8:53. Oilers 20–6. **Drive: 13 plays, 65 yards, 5:40.**

Top passers

- KC – Steve Fuller – 11/27, 138 yards, 4 INT
- HOU – Gifford Nielsen – 12/18, 173 yards, TD

Top rushers

- KC – Tony Reed – 11 rushes, 50 yards
- HOU – Earl Campbell – 32 rushes, 131 yards, TD

Top receivers

- KC – Tony Reed – 3 receptions, 37 yards
- HOU – Mike Barber – 3 receptions, 66 yards

==== Week 4: vs. Oakland Raiders ====
Week 4: Oakland Raiders at Kansas City Chiefs – Game summary

Quarter	1	2	3	4	Total
Raiders	0	0	0	7	**7**
**Chiefs**	14	0	7	14	**35**

at Arrowhead Stadium, Kansas City, Missouri

- Date: September 23
- Game time: 1:00 p.m. CDT
- Game weather: Sunny, 77 °F (25 °C)
- Game attendance: 67,821
- Referee: Ben Dreith
- TV announcers (NBC): Charlie Jones and Len Dawson
- Box score

Game information

**First quarter**

- KC – Steve Gaunty 19-yard pass from Steve Fuller (Jan Stenerud kick), 6:09. Chiefs 7–0. **Drive: 12 plays, 70 yards, 7:02.**
- KC – J. T. Smith 88-yard punt return (Jan Stenerud kick), 3:03. Chiefs 14–0.

**Second quarter**

- No scoring plays.

**Third quarter**

- KC – Gary Barbaro 70-yard interception return (Jan Stenerud kick), 1:35. Chiefs 21–0.

**Fourth quarter**

- KC – Arnold Morgado 1-yard run (Jan Stenerud kick), 5:31. Chiefs 28–0. **Drive: 15 plays, 58 yards, 9:35.**
- OAK – Derrick Jensen 1-yard pass from Jim Plunkett (Jim Breech kick), 3:33. Chiefs 28–7. **Drive: 5 plays, 46 yards, 1:58.**
- KC – Arnold Morgado 3-yard run (Jan Stenerud kick), 1:01. Chiefs 35–7. **Drive: 1 play, 3 yards, 0:03.**

Top passers

- OAK – Ken Stabler – 10/19, 91 yards, 2 INT
- KC – Steve Fuller – 9/17, 92 yards, TD, 2 INT

Top rushers

- OAK – Mark van Eeghen – 8 rushes, 35 yards
- KC – Ted McKnight – 15 rushes, 52 yards

Top receivers

- OAK – Raymond Chester – 4 receptions, 67 yards
- KC – Tony Reed – 2 receptions, 19 yards

==== Week 5: at Seattle Seahawks ====
Week 5: Kansas City Chiefs at Seattle Seahawks – Game summary

Quarter	1	2	3	4	Total
**Chiefs**	0	10	0	14	**24**
Seahawks	3	0	3	0	**6**

at Kingdome, Seattle, Washington

- Date: September 30
- Game time: 1:00 p.m. PDT
- Game weather: None (indoor stadium)
- Game attendance: 61,169
- Referee: Fred Wyant
- TV announcers (NBC): Jay Randolph and Paul Maguire
- Box score

Game information

**First quarter**

- SEA – Efrén Herrera 38-yard field goal, 12:29. Seahawks 3–0. **Drive: 7 plays, 47 yards, 2:21.**

**Second quarter**

- KC – Ted McKnight 23-yard run (Jan Stenerud kick), 13:49. Chiefs 7–3. **Drive: 1 play, 23 yards, 0:06.**
- KC – Jan Stenerud 36-yard field goal, 7:16. Chiefs 10–3. **Drive: 5 plays, 19 yards, 2:03.**

**Third quarter**

- SEA – Efrén Herrera 20-yard field goal, 4:56. Chiefs 10–6. **Drive: 11 plays, 78 yards, 6:28.**

**Fourth quarter**

- KC – Mike Williams 3-yard pass from Steve Fuller (Jan Stenerud kick), 9:03. Chiefs 17–6. **Drive: 5 plays, 20 yards, 2:42.**
- KC – Ted McKnight 84-yard run (Jan Stenerud kick), 1:27. Chiefs 24–6. **Drive: 3 plays, 89 yards, 0:25.**

Top passers

- KC – Steve Fuller – 8/12, 42 yards, TD, INT
- SEA – Jim Zorn – 23/38, 187 yards, INT

Top rushers

- KC – Ted McKnight – 12 rushes, 147 yards, 2 TD
- SEA – Sherman Smith – 12 rushes, 53 yards

Top receivers

- KC – Ed Beckman – 1 reception, 12 yards
- SEA – Dan Doornink – 10 receptions, 70 yards

==== Week 6: at Cincinnati Bengals ====
Week 6: Kansas City Chiefs at Cincinnati Bengals – Game summary

Quarter	1	2	3	4	Total
**Chiefs**	0	10	0	0	**10**
Bengals	0	0	7	0	**7**

at Riverfront Stadium, Cincinnati, Ohio

- Date: October 7
- Game time: 1:00 p.m. EDT
- Game weather: Sunny and cool, 53 °F (12 °C)
- Game attendance: 40,041
- Referee: Cal Lepore
- TV announcers (KCMO-Kansas City): Jack Harry, Ed Budde, and Nick Monroe
- Box score

Game information

**First quarter**

- No scoring plays.

**Second quarter**

- KC – Mike Williams 1-yard run (Jan Stenerud kick) 3:39. Chiefs 7–0. **Drive: 5 plays, 48 yards, 2:31.**
- KC – Jan Stenerud 46-yard field goal, 0:05. Chiefs 10–0. **Drive: 6 plays, 36 yards, 1:40.**

**Third quarter**

- CIN – Ken Anderson 1-yard run (Chris Bahr kick), 5:39. Chiefs 10–7. **Drive: 8 plays, 37 yards, 3:21.**

**Fourth quarter**

- No scoring plays.

Top passers

- KC – Steve Fuller – 7/12, 118 yards
- CIN – Ken Anderson – 12/23, 100 yards

Top rushers

- KC – Ted McKnight – 14 rushes, 41 yards
- CIN – Pete Johnson – 15 rushes, 41 yards

Top receivers

- KC – Tony Reed – 3 receptions, 76 yards
- CIN – Don Bass – 3 receptions, 41 yards

==== Week 7: vs. Denver Broncos ====
Week 7: Denver Broncos at Kansas City Chiefs – Game summary

Quarter	1	2	3	4	Total
**Broncos**	3	7	7	7	**24**
Chiefs	0	0	0	10	**10**

at Arrowhead Stadium, Kansas City, Missouri

- Date: October 14
- Game time: 3:00 p.m. CDT
- Game weather: Overcast, 59 °F (15 °C)
- Game attendance: 74,292
- Referee: Fred Silva
- TV announcers (NBC): Charlie Jones and Len Dawson
- Box score

Game information

**First quarter**

- DEN – Jim Turner 28-yard field goal, 0:04. Broncos 3–0. **Drive: 12 plays, 47 yards, 4:21.**

**Second quarter**

- DEN – Bill Thompson 2-yard fumble return (Jim Turner kick), 0:17. Broncos 10–0.

**Third quarter**

- DEN – Haven Moses 16-yard pass from Craig Morton (Jim Turner kick), 9:46. Broncos 17–0. **Drive: 4 plays, 71 yards, 2:18.**

**Fourth quarter**

- KC – Jan Stenerud 44-yard field goal, 9:57. Broncos 17–3. **Drive: 6 plays, 8 yards, 1:51.**
- DEN – Rick Upchurch 7-yard pass from Craig Morton (Jim Turner kick), 2:51. Broncos 24–3. **Drive: 10 plays, 81 yards, 4:08.**
- KC – Arnold Morgado 1-yard run (Jan Stenerud kick), 0:56. Broncos 24–10. **Drive: 9 plays, 59 yards, 1:55.**

Top passers

- DEN – Craig Morton – 17/30, 218 yards, 2 TD, INT
- KC – Steve Fuller – 8/17, 56 yards, INT

Top rushers

- DEN – Jon Keyworth – 8 rushes, 44 yards
- KC – Ted McKnight – 5 rushes, 42 yards

Top receivers

- DEN – Haven Moses – 4 receptions, 107 yards, TD
- KC – Tony Reed – 6 receptions, 36 yards

==== Week 8: vs. New York Giants ====
Week 8: New York Giants at Kansas City Chiefs – Game summary

Quarter	1	2	3	4	Total
**Giants**	0	0	14	7	**21**
Chiefs	3	7	0	7	**17**

at Arrowhead Stadium, Kansas City, Missouri

- Date: October 21
- Game time: 3:00 p.m. CDT
- Game weather: Sunny, 86 °F (30 °C)
- Game attendance: 44,362
- Referee: Dick Jorgensen
- TV announcers (CBS): Curt Gowdy and Hank Stram
- Box score

Game information

**First quarter**

- KC – Jan Stenerud 25-yard field goal, 13:09. Chiefs 3–0. **Drive: 4 plays, 2 yards, 0:51.**

**Second quarter**

- KC – Arnold Morgado 1-yard run (Jan Stenerud kick), 11:27. Chiefs 10–0. **Drive: 10 plays, 67 yards, 4:20.**

**Third quarter**

- NYG – Earnest Gray 53-yard pass from Phil Simms (Joe Danelo kick), 11:27. Chiefs 10–7. **Drive: 3 plays, 43 yards, 0:28.**
- NYG – Billy Taylor 3-yard run (Joe Danelo kick), 1:18. Giants 14–10. **Drive: 8 plays, 68 yards, 3:48.**

**Fourth quarter**

- KC – Henry Marshall 38-yard pass from Mike Livingston (Jan Stenerud kick), 3:28. Chiefs 17–14. **Drive: 1 play, 38 yards, 0:08.**
- NYG – Harry Carson 22-yard fumble return (Joe Danelo kick), 1:42. Giants 21–17.

Top passers

- NYG – Phil Simms – 12/26, 151 yards, TD, INT
- KC – Mike Livingston – 22/38, 294 yards, TD, 2 INT

Top rushers

- NYG – Doug Kotar – 11 rushes, 58 yards
- KC – Tony Reed – 20 rushes, 106 yards

Top receivers

- NYG – Earnest Gray – 4 receptions, 107 yards, TD
- KC – Tony Reed – 8 receptions, 103 yards

==== Week 9: at Denver Broncos ====
Week 9: Kansas City Chiefs at Denver Broncos – Game summary

Quarter	1	2	3	4	Total
Chiefs	0	0	3	0	**3**
**Broncos**	7	7	6	0	**20**

at Mile High Stadium, Denver, Colorado

- Date: October 28
- Game time: 2:00 p.m. MST
- Game weather: Sunny, 62 °F (17 °C)
- Game attendance: 74,908
- Referee: Jerry Markbreit
- TV announcers (NBC): Charlie Jones and Len Dawson
- Box score

Game information

**First quarter**

- DEN – Jim Jensen 25-yard pass from Craig Morton (Jim Turner kick), 9:36. Broncos 7–0. **Drive: 8 plays, 80 yards, 3:18.**

**Second quarter**

- DEN – Rick Upchurch 5-yard pass from Craig Morton (Jim Turner kick), 11:52. Broncos 14–0. **Drive: 4 plays, 12 yards, 2:16.**

**Third quarter**

- DEN – Rick Upchurch 32-yard pass from Jon Keyworth (kick blocked), 9:42. Broncos 20–0. **Drive: 3 plays, 63 yards, 1:28.**
- KC – Jan Stenerud 27-yard field goal, 1:54. Broncos 20–3. **Drive: 14 plays, 63 yards, 7:38.**

**Fourth quarter**

- No scoring plays.

Top passers

- KC – Steve Fuller – 12/20, 92 yards, INT
- DEN – Craig Morton – 20/32, 254 yards, 2 TD, INT

Top rushers

- KC – Tony Reed – 10 rushes, 41 yards
- DEN – Larry Canada – 5 rushes, 26 yards

Top receivers

- KC – Tony Samuels – 4 receptions, 28 yards
- DEN – Riley Odoms – 7 receptions, 114 yards

==== Week 10: vs. San Diego Chargers ====
Week 10: San Diego Chargers at Kansas City Chiefs – Game summary

Quarter	1	2	3	4	Total
**Chargers**	10	0	3	7	**20**
Chiefs	0	0	0	14	**14**

at Arrowhead Stadium, Kansas City, Missouri

- Date: November 4
- Game time: 1:00 p.m. CST
- Game weather: Sunny, 65 °F (18 °C)
- Game attendance: 59,353
- Referee: Jim Tunney
- TV announcers (NBC): Jay Randolph and Paul Maguire
- Box score

Game information

**First quarter**

- SD – John Jefferson 13-yard pass from Dan Fouts (Mike Wood kick), 11:21. Chargers 7–0. **Drive: 10 plays, 54 yards, 2:34.**
- SD – Mike Wood 31-yard field goal, 2:59. Chargers 10–0. **Drive: 12 plays, 71 yards, 6:37.**

**Second quarter**

- No scoring plays.

**Third quarter**

- SD – Mike Wood 26-yard field goal, 3:03. Chargers 13–0. **Drive: 14 plays, 58 yards, 7:32.**

**Fourth quarter**

- KC – Steve Fuller 18-yard run (Jan Stenerud kick), 14:06. Chargers 13–7. **Drive: 8 plays, 80 yards, 3:57.**
- SD – Clarence Williams 5-yard run (Mike Wood kick), 5:45. Chargers 20–7. **Drive: 14 plays, 73 yards, 8:21.**
- KC – J. T. Smith 24-yard pass from Steve Fuller (Jan Stenerud kick), 3:05. Chargers 20–14. **Drive: 7 plays, 73 yards, 2:40.**

Top passers

- SD – Dan Fouts – 28/44, 236 yards, TD, 2 INT
- KC – Steve Fuller – 15/26, 170 yards, TD, 2 INT

Top rushers

- SD – Lydell Mitchell – 13 rushes, 43 yards
- KC – Tony Reed – 11 rushes, 47 yards

Top receivers

- SD – John Jefferson – 6 receptions, 56 yards
- KC – J. T. Smith – 4 receptions, 56 yards, TD

==== Week 11: vs. Pittsburgh Steelers ====
Week 11: Pittsburgh Steelers at Kansas City Chiefs – Game summary

Quarter	1	2	3	4	Total
**Steelers**	10	10	0	10	**30**
Chiefs	0	0	3	0	**3**

at Arrowhead Stadium, Kansas City, Missouri

- Date: November 11
- Game time: 12:00 p.m. CST
- Game weather: Sunny, 43 °F (6 °C)
- Game attendance: 70,132
- Referee: Fred Wyant
- TV announcers (NBC): Don Criqui and John Brodie
- Box score

Game information

**First quarter**

- PIT – John Stallworth 26-yard pass from Terry Bradshaw (Matt Bahr kick), 11:13. Steelers 7–0. **Drive: 4 plays, 46 yards, 1:41.**
- PIT – Matt Bahr 31-yard field goal, 6:17. Steelers 10–0. **Drive: 6 plays, 29 yards, 2:11.**

**Second quarter**

- PIT – Lynn Swann 16-yard pass from Terry Bradshaw (Matt Bahr kick), 11:19. Steelers 17–0. **Drive: 10 plays, 71 yards, 5:39.**
- PIT – Matt Bahr 20-yard field goal, 0:03. Steelers 20–0. **Drive: 19 plays, 64 yards, 6:28.**

**Third quarter**

- KC – Jan Stenerud 42-yard field goal, 9:14. Steelers 20–3. **Drive: 8 plays, 35 yards, 3:37.**

**Fourth quarter**

- PIT – Matt Bahr 37-yard field goal, 10:25. Steelers 23–3. **Drive: 10 plays, 59 yards, 4:48.**
- PIT – Larry Brown 1-yard pass from Terry Bradshaw (Matt Bahr kick), 3:03. Steelers 30–3. **Drive: 9 plays, 42 yards, 5:43.**

Top passers

- PIT – Terry Bradshaw – 17/29, 232 yards, 3 TD, 2 INT
- KC – Steve Fuller – 9/20, 89 yards, INT

Top rushers

- PIT – Franco Harris – 20 rushes, 68 yards
- KC – Mike Williams – 6 rushes, 19 yards

Top receivers

- PIT – John Stallworth – 4 receptions, 88 yards, TD
- KC – J. T. Smith – 3 receptions, 47 yards

==== Week 12: at Oakland Raiders ====
Week 12: Kansas City Chiefs at Oakland Raiders – Game summary

Quarter	1	2	3	4	Total
**Chiefs**	7	3	14	0	**24**
Raiders	0	7	7	7	**21**

at Oakland–Alameda County Coliseum, Oakland, California

- Date: November 18
- Game time: 1:00 p.m. PST
- Game weather: Clear, 61 °F (16 °C)
- Game attendance: 53,596
- Referee: Jerry Seeman
- TV announcers (NBC): Merle Harmon and George Kunz
- Box score

Game information

**First quarter**

- KC – Horace Belton 3-yard run (Jan Stenerud kick), 6:01. Chiefs 7–0. **Drive: 7 plays, 51 yards, 3:23.**

**Second quarter**

- KC – Jan Stenerud 41-yard field goal, 12:27. Chiefs 10–0. **Drive: 7 plays, 18 yards, 3:18.**
- OAK – Mark van Eeghen 2-yard pass from Ken Stabler (Jim Breech kick), 1:07. Chiefs 10–7. **Drive: 11 plays, 60 yards, 3:36.**

**Third quarter**

- KC – Tony Samuels fumble recovery in endzone (Jan Stenerud kick), 6:49. Chiefs 17–7. **Drive: 15 plays, 92 yards, 8:11.**
- KC – Henry Marshall 23-yard run (Jan Stenerud kick), 4:59. Chiefs 24–7. **Drive: 1 play, 23 yards, 0:07.**
- OAK – Derrick Ramsey 16-yard pass from Ken Stabler (Jim Breech kick), 0:10. Chiefs 24–14. **Drive: 9 plays, 76 yards, 4:40.**

**Fourth quarter**

- OAK – Cliff Branch 3-yard pass from Ken Stabler (Jim Breech kick), 7:28. Chiefs 24–21. **Drive: 10 plays, 64 yards, 4:19.**

Top passers

- KC – Steve Fuller – 11/15, 122 yards
- OAK – Ken Stabler – 27/44, 296 yards, 3 TD, 2 INT

Top rushers

- KC – Mike Williams – 28 rushes, 109 yards
- OAK – Mark van Eeghen – 12 rushes, 38 yards

Top receivers

- KC – Mike Williams – 4 receptions, 54 yards
- OAK – Dave Casper – 7 receptions, 91 yards

==== Week 13: at San Diego Chargers ====
Week 13: Kansas City Chiefs at San Diego Chargers – Game summary

Quarter	1	2	3	4	Total
Chiefs	7	0	0	0	**7**
**Chargers**	7	7	7	7	**28**

at San Diego Stadium, San Diego, California

- Date: November 25
- Game time: 1:00 p.m. PST
- Game weather: Sunny, 68 °F (20 °C)
- Game attendance: 50,078
- Referee: Bob Frederic
- TV announcers (NBC): Sam Nover and Bob Trumpy
- Box score

Game information

**First quarter**

- KC – Mike Williams 8-yard pass from Steve Fuller (Jan Stenerud kick), 8:58. Chiefs 7–0. **Drive: 10 plays, 72 yards, 6:02.**
- SD – Charlie Joiner 29-yard pass from Dan Fouts (Mike Wood kick), 4:20. Tied 7–7. **Drive: 8 plays, 65 yards, 4:38.**

**Second quarter**

- SD – John Jefferson 42-yard pass from Dan Fouts (Mike Wood kick), 2:29. Chargers 14–7. **Drive: 8 plays, 91 yards, 3:48.**

**Third quarter**

- SD – Bob Klein 8-yard pass from Dan Fouts (Mike Wood kick), 5:05. Chargers 21–7. **Drive: 14 plays, 82 yards, 6:26.**

**Fourth quarter**

- SD – Artie Owens 8-yard run (Mike Wood kick), 8:11. Chargers 28–7. **Drive: 14 plays, 87 yards, 6:37.**

Top passers

- KC – Steve Fuller – 14/22, 144 yards, TD, INT
- SD – Dan Fouts – 27/43, 350 yards, 3 TD, INT

Top rushers

- KC – Ted McKnight – 9 rushes, 24 yards
- SD – Clarence Williams – 13 rushes, 63 yards

Top receivers

- KC – Henry Marshall – 2 receptions, 43 yards
- SD – Charlie Joiner – 9 receptions, 123 yards, TD

==== Week 14: vs. Seattle Seahawks ====
Week 14: Seattle Seahawks at Kansas City Chiefs – Game summary

Quarter	1	2	3	4	Total
Seahawks	0	0	7	14	**21**
**Chiefs**	14	10	6	7	**37**

at Arrowhead Stadium, Kansas City, Missouri

- Date: December 2
- Game time: 1:00 p.m. CST
- Game weather: Sunny, 32 °F (0 °C)
- Game attendance: 42,160
- Referee: Red Cashion
- TV announcers (NBC): Jay Randolph and Paul Maguire
- Box score

Game information

**First quarter**

- KC – J.T. Smith 28-yard pass from Steve Fuller (Jan Stenerud kick). Chiefs 7–0. **Drive: 8 plays, 68 yards, 3:29.**
- KC – Ted McKnight 5-yard run (Jan Stenerud kick), 5:43. Chiefs 14–0. **Drive: 1 play, 10 yards, 0:10.**

**Second quarter**

- KC – Earl Gant 2-yard run (Jan Stenerud kick), 14:57. Chiefs 21–0. **Drive: 13 plays, 43 yards, 5:33.**
- KC – Jan Stenerud 27-yard field goal, 0:18. Chiefs 24–0. **Drive: 8 plays, 40 yards, 4:07.**

**Third quarter**

- KC – Jan Stenerud 31-yard field goal, 11:29. Chiefs 27–0. **Drive: 7 plays, 51 yards, 2:23.**
- SEA – Jeff Moore 1-yard run (Efrén Herrera kick), 10:11. Chiefs 27–7. **Drive: 5 plays, 69 yards, 1:18.**
- KC – Jan Stenerud 22-yard field goal, 2:41. Chiefs 30–7. **Drive: 13 plays, 37 yards, 7:40.**

**Fourth quarter**

- KC – Ted McKnight 3-yard run (Jan Stenerud kick), 13:18. Chiefs 37–7. **Drive: 6 plays, 59 yards, 3:22.**
- SEA – Dan Doornink 1-yard run (Efrén Herrera kick), 10:12. Chiefs 37–14. **Drive: 5 plays, 75 yards, 3:06.**
- SEA – Jeff Moore 12-yard run (Efrén Herrera kick), 2:10. Chiefs 37–21. **Drive: 3 plays, 20 yards, 0:14.**

Top passers

- SEA – Jim Zorn – 22/45, 239 yards, 3 INT
- KC – Steve Fuller – 10/23, 137 yards, TD

Top rushers

- SEA – Jim Zorn – 2 rushes, 21 yards
- KC – Earl Gant – 21 rushes, 67 yards, TD

Top receivers

- SEA – Steve Largent – 9 receptions, 120 yards
- KC – J.T. Smith – 4 receptions, 60 yards, TD

==== Week 15: at Baltimore Colts ====
Week 15: Kansas City Chiefs at Baltimore Colts – Game summary

Quarter	1	2	3	4	Total
**Chiefs**	7	0	0	3	**10**
Colts	7	0	0	0	**7**

at Memorial Stadium, Baltimore, Maryland

- Date: December 9
- Game time: 2:00 p.m. EST
- Game weather: Sunny, clear, cold, 43 °F (6 °C)
- Game attendance: 25,684
- Referee: Gene Barth
- TV announcers (NBC): Phil Stone and Mike Lucci
- Box score

Game information

**First quarter**

- KC – Ted McKnight 5-yard run (Jan Stenerud kick), 5:16. Chiefs 7–0. **Drive: 5 plays, 19 yards, 2:06.**
- BAL – Joe Washington 43-yard pass from Greg Landry (Steve Mike-Mayer kick), 1:17. Tied 7–7. **Drive: 3 plays, 47 yards, 0:50.**

**Second quarter**

- No scoring plays.

**Third quarter**

- No scoring plays.

**Fourth quarter**

- KC – Jan Stenerud 43-yard field goal, 11:16. Chiefs 10–7. **Drive: 5 plays, 54 yards, 2:08.**

Top passers

- KC – Steve Fuller – 11/21, 90 yards
- BAL – Greg Landry – 16/36, 240 yards, TD, 2 INT

Top rushers

- KC – Ted McKnight – 14 rushes, 97 yards, TD
- BAL – Joe Washington – 21 rushes, 51 yards

Top receivers

- KC – Earl Gant – 5 receptions, 33 yards
- BAL – Joe Washington – 6 receptions, 70 yards, TD

==== Week 16: at Tampa Bay Buccaneers ====
Week 16: Kansas City Chiefs at Tampa Bay Buccaneers – Game summary

Quarter	1	2	3	4	Total
Chiefs	0	0	0	0	**0**
**Buccaneers**	0	0	0	3	**3**

at Tampa Stadium, Tampa, Florida

- Date: December 16
- Game time: 1:00 p.m. EST
- Game weather: Rain, 67 °F (19 °C)
- Game attendance: 63,624
- Referee: Jerry Seeman
- TV announcers (NBC): Jay Randolph and Paul Maguire
- Box score

Game information

**First quarter**

- No scoring plays.

**Second quarter**

- No scoring plays.

**Third quarter**

- No scoring plays.

**Fourth quarter**

- TB – Neil O'Donoghue 19-yard field goal, 8:50. Buccaneers 3–0. **Drive: 13 plays, 63 yards, 6:49.**

Top passers

- KC – Steve Fuller – 7/13, 46 yards, INT
- TB – Doug Williams – 5/13, 51 yards, 2 INT

Top rushers

- KC – Earl Gant – 6 rushes, 25 yards
- TB – Ricky Bell – 39 rushes, 137 yards

Top receivers

- KC – Earl Gant – 3 receptions, 24 yards
- TB – Jerry Eckwood – 2 receptions, 26 yards

=== Standings ===
AFC West
	W	L	T	PCT	DIV	CONF	PF	PA	STK
^{(1)} San Diego Chargers	12	4	0	.750	6–2	9–3	411	246	W2
^{(5)} Denver Broncos	10	6	0	.625	4–4	7–5	289	262	L2
Seattle Seahawks	9	7	0	.563	3–5	6–6	378	372	W2
Oakland Raiders	9	7	0	.563	3–5	5–7	365	337	L1
Kansas City Chiefs	7	9	0	.438	4–4	7–7	238	262	L1

== Awards and records ==
- Bob Grupp, NFL Leader, Punting, 43.6 average yards per punt
