= List of Tennessee State Tigers in the NFL draft =

This is a list of Tennessee State Tigers football players in the NFL draft.

== Key ==
B	Back	K	Kicker	NT	Nose tackle
C	Center	LB	Linebacker	FB	Fullback
DB	Defensive back	P	Punter	HB	Halfback
DE	Defensive end	QB	Quarterback	WR	Wide receiver
DT	Defensive tackle	RB	Running back	G	Guard
E	End	T	Offensive tackle	TE	Tight end

== Selections ==
Year	Round	Pick	Overall	Player	Team	Position
1952	28	8	333	Hal Turner	Detroit Lions	E
1953	28	4	329	Jim Caldwell	Chicago Bears	T
1961	8	5	103	George Balthazar	Pittsburgh Steelers	T
1964	18	2	240	Izzy Lang	Philadelphia Eagles	RB
1965	8	14	112	Roosevelt Davis	Baltimore Colts	T
1966	4	11	59	Willie Walker	Detroit Lions	WR
1966	6	12	92	Frank McRae	Chicago Bears	DT
1966	7	8	103	Johnnie Robinson	Detroit Lions	WR
1966	12	15	185	Jim Carer	Baltimore Colts	G
1967	3	12	65	Bill Tucker	San Francisco 49ers	RB
1967	4	7	87	Alvin Coleman	Minnesota Vikings	DB
1967	6	23	156	Noland Smith	Kansas City Chiefs	RB
1967	10	15	252	Leon Moore	Los Angeles Rams	DB
1967	10	23	260	Eugene Bowens	Dallas Cowboys	RB
1967	12	26	315	John Robinson	New Orleans Saints	WR
1967	13	3	318	Howard Finley	Buffalo Bills	DB
1968	1	3	3	Claude Humphrey	Atlanta Falcons	DE
1968	1	25	25	Eldridge Dickey	Oakland Raiders	QB
1968	4	25	108	John Robinson	Green Bay Packers	WR
1968	6	3	141	Leo Johnson	San Francisco 49ers	WR
1968	6	17	155	Dewey Warren	Cincinnati Bengals	QB
1968	8	24	216	Tommy Davis	Baltimore Colts	G
1969	1	23	23	Jim Marsalis	Kansas City Chiefs	DB
1969	3	13	65	Elbert Drungo	Houston Oilers	T
1969	5	25	129	King Dunlap	Baltimore Colts	DT
1969	8	4	186	Joe Cooper	Pittsburgh Steelers	WR
1969	11	24	284	Harold Rice	Oakland Raiders	LB
1969	12	9	295	Bob Shannon	Washington Redskins	DB
1969	13	2	313	Harry Carpenter	Atlanta Falcons	T
1970	2	10	36	Joe Jones	Cleveland Browns	DE
1970	5	13	117	Claude Brumfield	New York Giants	G
1970	16	3	393	Charles Williams	Miami Dolphins	G
1971	1	15	15	Vernon Holland	Cincinnati Bengals	T
1971	4	22	100	Larry Woods	Detroit Lions	DT
1971	6	13	143	Jacob Mayes	San Diego Chargers	RB
1971	7	12	168	Dave Davis	Green Bay Packers	WR
1971	8	15	197	Fred Herring	Cincinnati Bengals	DB
1971	10	4	238	William West	Oakland Raiders	DB
1971	11	4	264	Albert Davis	Philadelphia Eagles	RB
1971	11	13	273	Don Pinson	San Diego Chargers	DB
1971	17	19	435	Joe Sweet	Los Angeles Rams	WR
1972	2	19	45	Clifford Brooks	Cleveland Browns	DB
1972	11	8	268	Robert Stevenson	New York Jets	LB
1972	11	13	273	Joe Gilliam	Pittsburgh Steelers	QB
1973	2	12	38	Robert Woods	New York Jets	T
1973	4	6	84	James Thaxton	San Diego Chargers	TE
1973	4	7	85	Ollie Smith	Baltimore Colts	WR
1973	5	9	113	Charles McTorry	Denver Broncos	DB
1973	7	3	159	Will Wynn	Philadelphia Eagles	DE
1973	12	19	305	Larry Pettus	San Francisco 49ers	T
1973	13	6	318	Alfred Reese	San Diego Chargers	RB
1973	17	26	442	Charlie Wade	Miami Dolphins	WR
1974	1	1	1	Ed Jones	Dallas Cowboys	DE
1974	1	4	4	Waymond Bryant	Chicago Bears	LB
1974	2	3	29	John Holland	Minnesota Vikings	WR
1974	2	7	33	Greg Kindle	St. Louis Cardinals	T
1974	2	16	42	Carl Wafer	Denver Broncos	DT
1974	13	19	331	Ed Gatewood	Buffalo Bills	LB
1975	4	7	85	Cleveland Elam	San Francisco 49ers	DE
1975	7	17	173	Mike Hegman	Dallas Cowboys	LB
1975	9	10	218	James Johnson	San Francisco 49ers	DB
1975	14	1	339	James Lewis	Miami Dolphins	DB
1976	2	21	49	Loaird McCreary	Miami Dolphins	TE
1976	3	4	64	Larry Dorsey	San Diego Chargers	WR
1976	4	6	98	Melvin Mitchell	Miami Dolphins	G
1976	7	18	200	John Owens	Miami Dolphins	DE
1976	14	10	385	Melvin Shy	Philadelphia Eagles	DB
1977	4	18	102	Oliver Davis	Cleveland Browns	DB
1977	5	10	122	Nate Simpson	Green Bay Packers	RB
1977	6	6	145	Kevin Russell	Philadelphia Eagles	DB
1977	6	12	151	Larry Barnes	San Diego Chargers	RB
1977	11	3	282	Nate Jackson	Buffalo Bills	RB
1978	2	1	29	Sylvester Hicks	Kansas City Chiefs	DE
1978	2	18	46	Stan Johnson	Los Angeles Rams	DT
1978	4	1	85	Daniel Johnson	Kansas City Chiefs	LB
1978	4	18	102	Dwight Wheeler	New England Patriots	T
1978	4	23	107	Homer Elias	Detroit Lions	G
1978	5	2	112	Jerrold McRae	Kansas City Chiefs	WR
1978	6	14	152	Rodney Parker	Atlanta Falcons	WR
1979	10	13	261	John Smith	Cleveland Browns	WR
1979	11	1	276	Billy McBride	San Francisco 49ers	DB
1979	11	26	301	Jesse Deremus	Los Angeles Rams	DT
1981	12	18	322	Joe Adams	San Francisco 49ers	QB
1982	5	10	121	Malcolm Taylor	Houston Oilers	DE
1982	9	10	233	Bryan Howard	Minnesota Vikings	DB
1982	12	3	309	Donald Laster	Washington Redskins	T
1983	3	24	80	Steve Moore	New England Patriots	G
1983	6	19	159	Mike Jones	Minnesota Vikings	WR
1983	6	25	165	Larry Kinnebrew	Cincinnati Bengals	RB
1983	8	7	203	Richard Dent	Chicago Bears	DE
1983	10	15	266	Walter Tate	Minnesota Vikings	C
1984	5	8	120	Golden Tate II	Indianapolis Colts	WR
1985	11	9	289	Herman Hunter	Philadelphia Eagles	RB
1987	3	19	75	Onzy Elam	New York Jets	LB
1987	8	10	205	Charles Buchanan	Pittsburgh Steelers	DE
1988	11	2	279	Frank Pillow	Tampa Bay Buccaneers	WR
1990	3	3	56	Tony Stargell	New York Jets	DB
1990	3	20	73	Anthony Pleasant	Cleveland Browns	DE
1990	11	13	289	Anthony Shelton	San Francisco 49ers	DB
1990	11	24	300	Tyrone Watson	Philadelphia Eagles	WR
1992	6	5	145	Larry Tharpe	Detroit Lions	T
1992	10	24	276	Marcus Dowdell	New Orleans Saints	WR
1993	7	19	187	Patrick Robinson	Houston Oilers	WR
1994	4	20	123	Randy Fuller	Denver Broncos	DB
1995	5	16	150	Cedric Davis	Arizona Cardinals	DB
1996	7	18	227	Clarence Jones	Jacksonville Jaguars	WR
1996	7	36	245	Darrell Williams	Kansas City Chiefs	DB
2000	4	6	100	Michael Thompson	Atlanta Falcons	G
2000	4	27	121	Avion Black	Buffalo Bills	WR
2008	1	16	16	Dominique Rodgers-Cromartie	Arizona Cardinals	DB
2009	7	3	212	Javarris Williams	Kansas City Chiefs	RB
2014	5	3	143	Kadeem Edwards	Tampa Bay Buccaneers	G
2014	7	35	250	Demetrius Rhaney	St. Louis Rams	C
2015	5	40	176	Robert Myers	Baltimore Ravens	G
2015	7	1	218	Anthony Morris	Oakland Raiders	T
2020	7	13	227	Lachavious Simmons	Chicago Bears	T

== Notable undrafted players ==
Note: No drafts held before 1936

Debut year	Player name	Position	Debut NFL/AFL team	Notes
1960	Chuck Gavin	DE	Denver Broncos	—
1961	Charley Ferguson	WR/TE	Cleveland Browns	—
1964	Willie Mitchell	CB	Kansas City Chiefs	—
1967	Cid Edwards	RB	St. Louis Cardinals	—
1967	Mack Lamb	CB	Miami Dolphins	—
1974	Jim Kelly	TE	Chicago Bears	—
1975	Charlie Thomas	RB	Kansas City Chiefs	—
1976	Larry Mallory	S	New York Giants	—
1980	McDonald Oden	TE	Cleveland Browns	—
1983	Darryl Caldwell	T	Buffalo Bills	—
1985	Alex Carter	DE	Buffalo Bills	—
1986	Riley Walton	TE	Kansas City Chiefs	—
1987	Stephen Griffin	RB	Kansas City Chiefs	—
1987	Steve Holloway	TE	Tampa Bay Buccaneers	—
1991	Roger Jones	CB	Indianapolis Colts	—
1992	Bernard Wilson	DT	Detroit Lions	—
1994	Brent Alexander	S	Arizona Cardinals	—
1995	Simon Shanks	LB	Arizona Cardinals	—
2000	Bennie Anderson	G	St. Louis Rams	—
2001	Ligarius Jennings	DB	Detroit Lions	—
2002	Eric Joyce	DB	Arizona Cardinals	—
2004	Lawrence Smith	T/G	Buffalo Bills	—
2008	Lamar Divens	DT	San Diego Chargers	—
2010	Anthony Levine	S	Green Bay Packers	—
2015	De'Ante Saunders	S	Cleveland Browns	—
2019	Terrell Bonds	DB	Baltimore Ravens	—
2020	Chris Rowland	WR	Atlanta Falcons	—
