= Lance Rodgers =

- Born: January 30, 1955 (age 71)
- Occupation: Artist
- Website: lancerodgersart.com

Lance Dwayne Rodgers (born January 30, 1955) is an American postwar and contemporary artist, painter, fine art photographer, and musician based in St. Petersburg, Florida.

His art is displayed in many museums, including a permanent display at the James Museum of Western and Wildlife Art. A painting of his is also hanging in the American embassy in Madrid, Spain.

== Personal life ==
Lance Rodgers graduated from Northeast High School in 1973. He was a member of the swimming team, water polo team, German club, Lettemens' club, art club, varsity cheerleader, pep squad, stage band, and "uncle wigglys' board game champion".

He attended college at Florida State University where he completed his bachelor's in Visual Arts in 1977.

In 2003, Rodgers suffered a major heart complication that prevented him from painting for a couple of years

== Career ==
In 1992, Rodgers became Salt Creek Artworks’ first art tenant. Where he served as the Curator of Exhibitions there for 20 years. Rodgers organized exhibitions, located, and represented painters, sculptors, photographers, potters, performance, and installation artists from all over the United States.

Rodgers regularly hosts charity art auctions. In 1998 he helped raise $30,000 for American Stage. He would regularly perform auctions throughout his career.

The Salt Creek Art Center closed in 2012. Lance Rodgers was the only curator for all of its 20 years.

In 2020 his art was featured at the Left Bank Bistro in St. Petersburg, Florida.
