= Tony Reed =

American football player (born 1955)

No. 32
- Position: Running back

Personal information
- Born: March 30, 1955 (age 71); San Francisco, California, U.S.
- Listed height: 5 ft 11 in (1.80 m)
- Listed weight: 197 lb (89 kg)

Career information
- College: Colorado
- NFL draft: 1977: 2nd round, 37th overall pick

Career history
- Kansas City Chiefs (1977–1980); Denver Broncos (1981)

Awards and highlights
- Second-team All-American (1976); First-team All-Big Eight (1976)

Career NFL statistics
- Rushing attempts: 581
- Rushing yards: 2,340
- Rushing TDs: 8
- Stats at Pro Football Reference

Tony Reed (born March 30, 1955) is an American former professional football player who was a running back for five seasons in the National Football League (NFL). He played college football for the Colorado Buffaloes. He played in the NFL from 1977 to 1981.

When he was in Kansas City he wore number 32. Rushing the ball his stats were 2,340 total rushing yards, eight rushing touchdowns. His receiving statistics were 1,699 receiving yards and two touchdowns. He played 71 Games. His most productive season was 1978 when he rushed for over 1000 yards for Kansas City.

Prior to transferring to Colorado, Reed played at Antelope Valley College in Lancaster, California after moving from Japan. around the time his father had been stationed in the military. His addition to what was, at that time, a small town junior college football team caused a remarkable stir in the support of the program from the community.

== NFL career statistics ==
Legend
**Bold**	Career high

Year	Team	Games		Rushing					Receiving				
Year	Team	GP	GS	Att	Yds	Avg	Lng	TD	Rec	Yds	Avg	Lng	TD
1977	KAN	14	8	126	505	4.0	59	2	12	125	**10.4**	20	0
1978	KAN	**16**	**16**	**206**	**1,053**	**5.1**	**62**	**5**	**48**	**483**	10.1	**44**	**1**
1979	KAN	11	11	113	446	3.9	23	1	34	352	**10.4**	40	0
1980	KAN	15	7	68	180	2.6	24	0	44	422	9.6	34	**1**
1981	DEN	15	0	68	156	2.3	10	0	34	317	9.3	33	0
		71	42	581	2,340	4.0	62	8	172	1,699	9.9	44	2
