= Jan Stenerud =

Norwegian-American football player (born 1942)

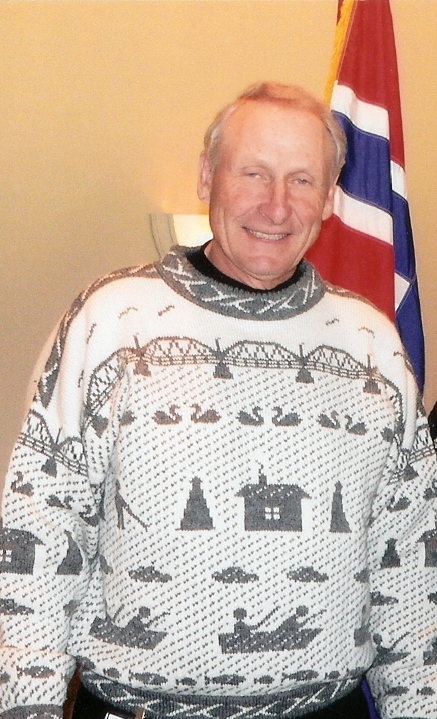
- Stenerud in 2005

No. 3, 10
- Position: Placekicker

Personal information
- Born: November 26, 1942 (age 83); Fetsund, Norway
- Listed height: 6 ft 2 in (1.88 m)
- Listed weight: 187 lb (85 kg)

Career information
- College: Montana State (1964–1966)
- AFL draft: 1966: 3rd round, 24th overall pick

Career history
- Kansas City Chiefs (1967–1979); Green Bay Packers (1980–1983); Minnesota Vikings (1984–1985)

Awards and highlights
- Super Bowl champion (IV); AFL champion (1969); 4× First-team All-Pro (1970, 1971, 1974, 1984); 2× First-team All-AFL (1968, 1969); 2× Second-team All-Pro (1975, 1976); Second-team All-AFL (1967); 4× Pro Bowl (1970, 1971, 1975, 1984); 2× AFL All-Star (1968, 1969); NFL 75th Anniversary All-Time Team; NFL 100th Anniversary All-Time Team; Green Bay Packers Hall of Fame; Kansas City Chiefs Hall of Fame; Kansas City Chiefs No. 3 retired; First-team All-American (1966); Montana State Bobcats No. 78 retired

Career AFL/NFL statistics
- Field goals attempted: 558
- Field goals made: 373
- Field goal percentage: 66.8%
- Longest field goal: 55
- Extra points attempted: 601
- Extra points made: 580
- Extra point percentage: 96.5%
- Points scored: 1,699
- Stats at Pro Football Reference
- Pro Football Hall of Fame

Jan Stenerud (/ˈstɛnəruːd/, Norwegian: [ˈstèːnərʉːd]; born November 26, 1942) is a Norwegian-American former professional football placekicker who played in the National Football League (NFL) and American Football League (AFL) for 19 seasons, primarily with the Kansas City Chiefs. The first Norwegian NFL player, he played college football for the Montana State Bobcats and earned All-American honors. Stenerud began his career in the AFL after being selected by the Chiefs during the 1966 draft and joined the NFL following the AFL–NFL merger. Along with his 13 seasons in Kansas City, Stenerud was a member of the Green Bay Packers for four seasons and the Minnesota Vikings for two seasons until retiring in 1985.

Stenerud was a six-time all-star (four NFL Pro Bowls and two AFL All-Star games) during his career, as well as a four-time first-team All-Pro in the NFL and a two-time first-team All-AFL. The season prior to the AFL–NFL merger, he also helped the Chiefs win their first Super Bowl title in Super Bowl IV. He was inducted to the Pro Football Hall of Fame in 1991 as the first exclusive placekicker to receive the honor.

== Early life and college ==
Born in Fetsund, in the county of Akershus, Norway to parents Johan and Klara (Kjustad) Stenerud, Stenerud came to the United States as a college student, on a ski jumping scholarship to Montana State University in Bozeman. In the fall of 1964, Stenerud was training for the upcoming skiing season by running the stadium steps of Gatton Field, the football venue through 1971. That day, he was cooling down from a workout by kicking a football with injured halfback Dale Jackson. Stenerud had played soccer as a youth in Norway, and his right leg's prowess was observed by basketball head coach Roger Craft, while he walked to the nearby Fieldhouse. Craft notified football head coach Jim Sweeney of the Norwegian ski jumper's kicking abilities, and Sweeney offered him a tryout, which was successful. Though ineligible for football competition that season, Sweeney encouraged Stenerud to suit up with the team for the final home game of 1964, to help him better understand the unfamiliar American game.

Following the skiing season, Stenerud joined the football team for spring drills in 1965 and as a junior that fall he kicked a 59-yard field goal, then a college football record, in a 24–7 home win over rival Montana. In 2013, Stenerud recalled that he had a significant tail-wind aiding him on that kick in Bozeman; the ensuing kick-off went over the end-zone bleachers at Gatton Field, whose elevation exceeded 4,900 feet (1,495 m) above sea level. He was named an All-American by The Sporting News as a senior in 1966, and was also an All-American in ski jumping and a three-time Big Sky champion.

== Professional career ==
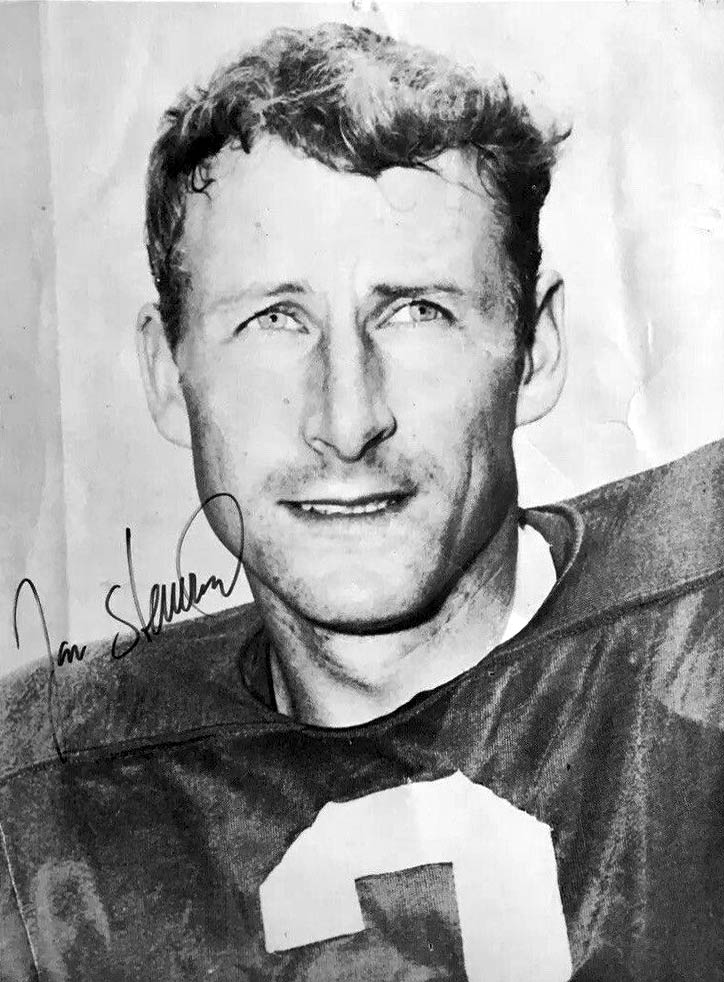
Stenerud with the KC Chiefs, c. 1967

Stenerud was one of the first professional football players to be used as a dedicated kicker, because of his excellent "sharpshooting" ball-kicking performance. He was one of the first placekickers to use the "soccer style", a technique the Hungarian-born Pete Gogolak had recently introduced in the AFL. During his first three years as professional, the last seasons for the AFL, Stenerud hit 70% of his field goals, compared with a 53% average for the other kickers in the AFL and NFL.

The Chiefs were the final AFL champions in 1969, and they met the NFL Champion Minnesota Vikings in Super Bowl IV in New Orleans. The underdog Chiefs won 23–7, and Stenerud kicked three field goals, scoring the first nine points of the game. His first, a 48-yarder, was the longest field goal in a Super Bowl for 24 years, exceeded by Steve Christie of the Buffalo Bills in Super Bowl XXVIII in January 1994.

On Christmas Day 1971, the Chiefs hosted the Miami Dolphins in an AFC divisional playoff game. In perhaps his toughest day as a professional, Stenerud made a 24-yard field goal in the first quarter, but then missed from 29 and 32 yards, the latter with 35 seconds remaining in regulation, and had a 42-yarder blocked three minutes into overtime. The Dolphins won 27–24 in double overtime, on a 37-yard field goal by Garo Yepremian. The game, also the last the Chiefs played in Kansas City's Municipal Stadium, remains the longest in NFL history as of 2023, at 82 minutes, 40 seconds of playing time.

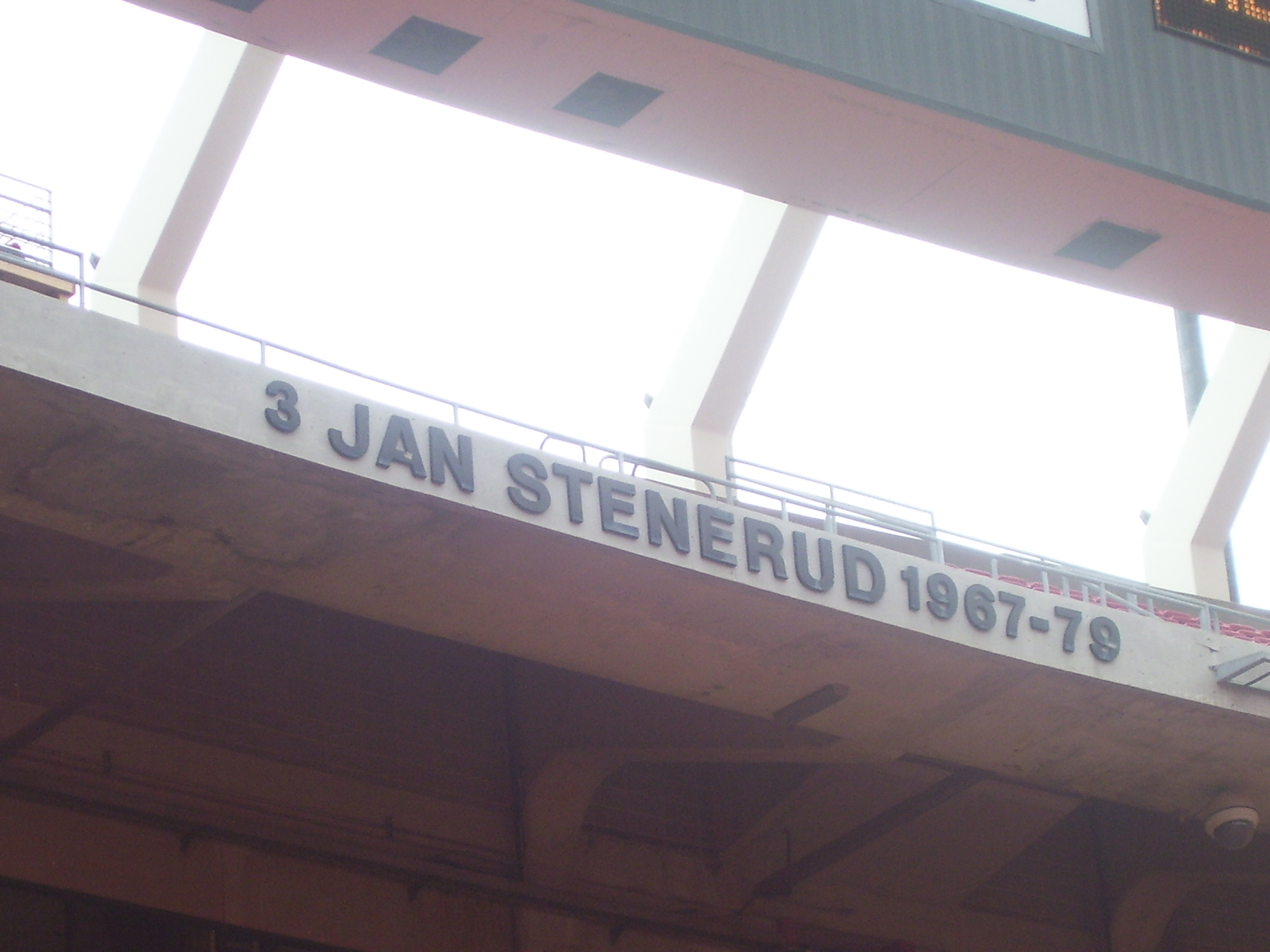
Stenerud's name in the Chiefs' ring of honor at Arrowhead Stadium, June 2008

Stenerud retired after the 1985 season, his 19th (3 AFL, 16 NFL). He converted 373 out of 558 field goals (67 percent) and 580 out of 601 extra points (97%) for a total of 1,699 points scored. At the time of his retirement, he was the longest-tenured (19 years) professional football player to have played in the AFL.

Enshrined in 1991, Stenerud, along with George Blanda, Lou Groza, Ray Guy, and 2017 inductee Morten Andersen, is one of only five kicking specialists in the Pro Football Hall of Fame, and is one of three who did not play another position (Blanda played quarterback, Groza was a tackle). The Chiefs retired Stenerud's jersey number 3 in his honor. In 1991, he was inducted into the Green Bay Packers Hall of Fame. He was selected to the NFL's 75th Anniversary Team in 1994 and to the NFL's 100th Anniversary Team in 2019.

In recent years, Stenerud has been involved in a Kansas City firm involved in designing stadiums and sports arenas. He also worked as a commentator for Scandinavian TV channel TV3's Super Bowl Sunday coverage in the 1990s, and still maintains strong ties with his native Norway. The street where he grew up, in the municipality Fetsund, was renamed in his honor.

== Career regular season statistics ==
Legend
| | Won the Super Bowl |
| | Led the league |
| **Bold** | Career high |

| Season | Team | G | FGM | FGA | % | LNG | XPM | XPA | % | PTS |
|---|---|---|---|---|---|---|---|---|---|---|
| 1967 | KC | 14 | 21 | 36 | 58.3 | 54 | 45 | 45 | **100.0** | 108 |
| 1968 | KC | 14 | **30** | 40 | 75.0 | 52 | 39 | 40 | 97.5 | **129** |
| 1969 | KC | 14 | 27 | 35 | 77.1 | 54 | 38 | 38 | **100.0** | 119 |
| 1970 | KC | 14 | **30** | 42 | 71.4 | **55** | 26 | 26 | **100.0** | 116 |
| 1971 | KC | 14 | 26 | **44** | 59.1 | 54 | 32 | 32 | **100.0** | 110 |
| 1972 | KC | 14 | 21 | 36 | 58.3 | 50 | 32 | 32 | **100.0** | 95 |
| 1973 | KC | 14 | 24 | 38 | 63.2 | 47 | 21 | 23 | 91.3 | 93 |
| 1974 | KC | 14 | 17 | 24 | 70.8 | 50 | 24 | 26 | 92.3 | 75 |
| 1975 | KC | 14 | 22 | 32 | 68.8 | 51 | 30 | 31 | 96.8 | 96 |
| 1976 | KC | 14 | 21 | 38 | 55.3 | 52 | 27 | 33 | 81.8 | 90 |
| 1977 | KC | 14 | 8 | 18 | 44.4 | 37 | 27 | 28 | 96.4 | 51 |
| 1978 | KC | 16 | 20 | 30 | 66.7 | 47 | 25 | 26 | 96.2 | 85 |
| 1979 | KC | 16 | 12 | 23 | 52.2 | 46 | 28 | 29 | 96.6 | 64 |
| 1980 | GB | 4 | 3 | 5 | 60.0 | 40 | 3 | 3 | **100.0** | 12 |
| 1981 | GB | 16 | 22 | 24 | **91.7** | 53 | 35 | 36 | 97.2 | 101 |
| 1982 | GB | 9 | 13 | 18 | 72.2 | 48 | 25 | 27 | 92.6 | 64 |
| 1983 | GB | 16 | 21 | 26 | 80.8 | 48 | **52** | **52** | **100.0** | 115 |
| 1984 | MIN | 16 | 20 | 23 | 87.0 | 54 | 30 | 31 | 96.8 | 90 |
| 1985 | MIN | 16 | 15 | 26 | 57.7 | 49 | 41 | 43 | 95.3 | 86 |
| Career | | 263 | 373 | 558 | 66.8 | 55 | 580 | 601 | 96.5 | 1,699 |
