= Marilyn Bornhorst =

American politician (1927–2020)

- Bornhorst in 1988

Chair of the Democratic Party of Hawaiʻi
- In office 1996–1998
- Preceded by: Richard Port
- Succeeded by: Walter Heen

Chair of the Honolulu City Council
- In office January 17, 1986 – January 2, 1987
- Preceded by: George G. Akahane
- Succeeded by: Arnold Morgado
- In office January 18, 1977 – January 2, 1979
- Preceded by: George G. Akahane
- Succeeded by: Rudy Pacarro

Member of the Honolulu City Council
- Preceded by: Constituency established
- Succeeded by: Neil Abercrombie
- Constituency: District V (1983–July 18, 1988); District VII (1975–1983)

Personal details
- Born: May 7, 1927 Dearborn, Michigan, U.S.
- Died: May 13, 2020 (aged 93) Honolulu, Hawaii, U.S.
- Party: Democratic
- Spouse: Karl Bornhorst
- Children: 2
- Education: University of California, Los Angeles

Marilyn R. Bornhorst (May 7, 1927 – May 13, 2020) was an American politician, civic leader, and environmental advocate from Honolulu, Hawaii. A member of the Democratic Party, she became the first woman to chair the Honolulu City Council and the Democratic Party of Hawaiʻi. She served on the Honolulu City Council for 14 years, from 1975 to 1988.

== Early life and career ==
Bornhorst was born on May 7, 1927 in Dearborn, Michigan. She graduated with a political science degree from the University of California, Los Angeles, later moving to Waikīkī, Hawaii.

Bornhorst was active in Honolulu civic affairs prior to holding public office, including involvement with the League of Women Voters of Honolulu. In 1980, following a conference in Washington state, she and then-Kauai County Councilmember JoAnn Yukimura introduced the "1,000 Friends" land-use advocacy model from Oregon to Hawaii, organizing the initial meeting in 1981 that established the environmental and land-use nonprofit organization Hawaii's Thousand Friends. She also served as executive director of the National Association of Social Workers.

== Political career ==
=== Honolulu City Council (1975–1988) ===
Bornhorst took office on the Honolulu City Council in 1975, representing District VII. On January 18, 1977, she became the first woman to serve as Chair of the Honolulu City Council, holding the leadership post through January 2, 1979. She continued representing District VII through 1983, and subsequently represented District V starting in the 1983–1987 council term.

Following a special recall election in October 1985 that unseated several councilmembers, Bornhorst returned to the role of Council Chair on January 17, 1986, serving until January 2, 1987. During her tenure in the late 1980s, she frequently aligned with slow-growth and environmental preservation coalitions, notably voting against development permits near Sandy Beach in East Honolulu.

=== 1988 Honolulu mayoral campaign ===
On July 18, 1988, Bornhorst resigned from her District V seat on the Honolulu City Council to run for Mayor of Honolulu against incumbent mayor Frank Fasi, with whom she frequently clashed. Bornhorst lost to Fasi, and her council seat was filled via special election by Neil Abercrombie.

=== Democratic Party of Hawaiʻi ===
Following her tenure on the city council, Bornhorst remained active in state party politics and worked in real estate in Honolulu. From 1996 to 1998, she served as chair of the Democratic Party of Hawaiʻi, succeeding Richard Port and preceding Walter Heen. In a statement released after Bornhorst's death, U.S. Senator Brian Schatz, party chair from 2008 to 2010, acknowledged Bornhorst as a personal mentor and the reason he joined the Democratic party.

== Personal life ==
On May 13, 2020, at the age of 93, Bornhorst died from a brain aneurysm in a Makiki retirement home. She was married to Karl Bornhorst until his death in 2010. They had two daughters.
