= J. T. Smith (American football) =

American football player and coach (born 1955)

John Thomas (J. T.) Smith
No. 81, 86, 84
- Positions: Wide receiver, return specialist

Personal information
- Born: October 29, 1955 (age 71); Leonard, Texas, U.S.
- Listed height: 6 ft 2 in (1.88 m)
- Listed weight: 185 lb (84 kg)

Career information
- High school: Big Spring (Big Spring, Texas)
- College: North Texas
- NFL draft: 1978: undrafted

Career history

Playing
- Washington Redskins (1978); Kansas City Chiefs (1978–1984); St. Louis / Phoenix Cardinals (1985–1990)

Coaching
- Iowa Barnstormers (2011) Interim head coach

Awards and highlights
- First-team All-Pro (1980); Second-team All-Pro (1987); 2× Pro Bowl (1980, 1988); NFL receptions leader (1987); NFL receiving yards leader (1987)

Career NFL statistics
- Receptions: 544
- Receiving yards: 6,974
- Receiving touchdowns: 35
- Stats at Pro Football Reference

John Thomas Smith (born October 29, 1955) is an American former professional football player who was a wide receiver and return specialist in the National Football League (NFL) from 1978 to 1990. He played college football for the North Texas Mean Green. Smith played in the NFL for the Washington Redskins, the Kansas City Chiefs, and the St.Louis/Phoenix Cardinals. His best year as a professional came during the strike shortened 1987 season for the Cardinals when he led the NFL with 91 receptions for 1,117 yards, a feat aided by the fact he played alongside the replacement players while his usual teammates were on strike.

On May 17, 2011, Smith was named the interim head coach of the Iowa Barnstormers in the Arena Football League. He remained the head coach until the conclusion of the season.

== NFL career statistics ==
Legend
	Led the league
**Bold**	Career high

Year	Team	Games		Receiving				
Year	Team	GP	GS	Rec	Yds	Avg	Lng	TD
1978	WAS	3	0	0	0	0.0	0	0
1978	KAN	6	0	0	0	0.0	0	0
1979	KAN	**16**	13	33	444	13.5	34	3
1980	KAN	**16**	**16**	46	655	14.2	**77**	2
1981	KAN	**16**	15	63	852	13.5	42	2
1982	KAN	5	3	10	168	**16.8**	51	1
1983	KAN	9	1	7	85	12.1	18	0
1984	KAN	15	0	8	69	8.6	16	0
1985	STL	14	5	43	581	13.5	34	1
1986	STL	**16**	**16**	80	1,014	12.7	45	6
1987	STL	15	14	**91**	**1,117**	12.3	38	**8**
1988	PHO	**16**	**16**	83	986	11.9	29	5
1989	PHO	9	8	62	778	12.5	31	5
1990	PHO	13	8	18	225	12.5	45	2
Career		169	115	544	6,974	12.8	77	35
