= Northeast High School (St. Petersburg, Florida) =

Location
- 5500 16th Street North; St. Petersburg, Florida 33703; United States; 27°49′22.10″N 82°39′20.36″W

Information
- Type: Public Secondary
- Motto: "once a viking, always a viking"
- Established: 1954; 72 years ago
- School district: Pinellas County Schools
- Principal: Michael Vasallo
- Staff: 84.00 (FTE)
- Grades: 9–12
- Student to teacher ratio: 20.98
- Campus size: 43 acres (170,000 m^{2})
- Colors: Scarlet, Cream and Black
- Athletics: 7A
- Athletics conference: District 10
- Mascot: Vikings
- Newspaper: Nor'easter
- Yearbook: Viking Log
- Website: Northeast High School

Northeast High School is a public high school in St. Petersburg, Florida. The school is part of the Pinellas County Schools district. Located just across the street from Meadowlawn Middle School and east of John M. Sexton Elementary School (named after Northeast's first principal), Northeast High School is one of the main high schools in the Saint Petersburg area. The school mascot is the Viking and the school colors are scarlet, cream, and black. Northeast High School is commonly referred to as NEHI.

On May 5, 1961, an F2 tornado struck the high school.

== Former principals ==
- Michael J. Hernandez (2018-2026)
- Kevin K. Hendrick (2008–2010) (2012–2017)
- Paulagene Nelson (2010–2012)
- Patricia Wright (2005–2008)
- Michael A. Miller (1992–2005)
- Charley J. Williams (1989–1992)
- J. Thomas Zachary (1979–1989)
- Bill G. Williamson (1974–1979)
- Lee R. Benjamin (1970–1974)
- William G. Justice (1968–1970)
- Thomas H. Rothchild (1965–1968)
- John M. Sexton (1953–1965)

== Notable alumni ==
- Danielle Collins – collegiate and professional tennis player
- Jeff D'Amico – former Major League Baseball player (Milwaukee Brewers, New York Mets, Pittsburgh Pirates, Cleveland Indians)
- Tom Hume – former Major League Baseball player (Cincinnati Reds, Philadelphia Phillies)
- Craig Lefferts – former Major League Baseball player (Chicago Cubs, San Diego Padres, San Francisco Giants, Baltimore Orioles, Texas Rangers, California Angels)
- Betsy Nagelsen – former professional tennis player, Australian Open singles finalist and doubles champion
- Megan Romano – swimmer at University of Georgia
- David Ruprecht – Actor and game show host, host of Supermarket Sweep from 1990-2003 on Lifetime/Pax-TV and Real People (TV program) on NBC.
- Tony Samuels former NFL player, tight end for Kansas City Chiefs
- Brad Snyder – Paralympic Olympic gold medalist, US Navy officer
- Jacob Spencer - Collegiate Athlete, Lawrence University
- Doug Waechter – former Major League Baseball player (Tampa Bay Rays, Florida Marlins, Kansas City Royals)
- Frank Wren – MLB executive with Atlanta Braves, Baltimore Orioles, Boston Red Sox, Florida Marlins

== Athletics ==
Northeast High School participates in the following sports:

Fall Sports

- Cross Country
- Football
- Golf
- Swimming
- Volleyball
- Marching Band

Winter Sports

- Boys Basketball
- Girls Basketball
- Boys Soccer
- Girls Soccer
- Wrestling

Spring Sports

- Baseball
- Flag Football
- Softball
- Tennis
- Track—2012 Girls Basketball Sportsmanship Award—Pinellas County Girls Basketball Coaches Association—2012 PCAC Flag Football District Champions—2012 PCAC Coach of the Year—Chris Holler
