= Stan Johnson (American football) =

American football player (born 1955)

No. 72
- Position: Defensive lineman

Personal information
- Born: June 18, 1955 (age 71); Sandusky, Ohio, U.S.
- Listed height: 6 ft 4 in (1.93 m)
- Listed weight: 275 lb (125 kg)

Career information
- High school: Sandusky
- College: Tennessee State
- NFL draft: 1978: 2nd round, 46th overall pick

Career history
- Los Angeles Rams (1978)*; Kansas City Chiefs (1978); Philadelphia Eagles (1980)*; Hamilton Tiger-Cats (1981)*
- * Offseason or practice squad member only
- Stats at Pro Football Reference

George Stanley Johnson (born June 18, 1955) is an American former professional football defensive lineman who played for the Kansas City Chiefs of the National Football League (NFL). He played college football for the Tennessee State Tigers and was selected by the Los Angeles Rams in the second round of the 1978 NFL draft.

== Early life ==
George Stanley Johnson was born on June 18, 1955, in Sandusky, Ohio. He attended Sandusky High School.

== College career ==
Johnson enrolled at Tennessee State University to play college football for the Tigers as a defensive tackle and placekicker. He earned a varsity letter in 1976. He was not credited with a varsity letter in 1977 despite recording five of ten field goals, 26 of 30 extra points, and one interception.

== Professional career ==
Johnson was selected by the Los Angeles Rams in the second round, with the 46th overall pick, of the 1978 NFL draft. On August 27, 1978, he was traded to the Kansas City Chiefs for an undisclosed draft pick. He played in ten games for the Chiefs during the 1978 season as a reserve defensive end/nose tackle. Johnson was released on August 21, 1979, after the third of four preseason games.

Johnson signed with the Philadelphia Eagles on February 1, 1980. He was released on August 17, 1980, after the second game of the 1980 preseason.

Johnson was signed by the Hamilton Tiger-Cats of the Canadian Football League on March 30, 1981. He played for them during the preseason but suffered an injury and did not make the regular season roster.
