= Bill Kellar =

American football player (born 1956)

No. 82
- Position: Wide receiver

Personal information
- Born: February 8, 1956 (age 70); Longview, Washington, U.S.
- Listed height: 5 ft 11 in (1.80 m)
- Listed weight: 187 lb (85 kg)

Career information
- High school: Hillsboro (OR)
- College: Stanford
- NFL draft: 1978: 7th round, 184th overall pick

Career history
- Kansas City Chiefs (1978)
- Stats at Pro Football Reference

William Elden Kellar (born February 8, 1956) is an American former professional football wide receiver who played part of one season in the National Football League (NFL) for the Kansas City Chiefs.

== Early life and college ==
Kellar was born in Longview, Washington, but played high school football at Hillsboro High School in the Portland metropolitan area where his father was the track coach. During the 1973 state championship game he scored two receiving touchdowns against Medford, which at the time was the second most in championship game history. He played college football at Stanford University as a wide receiver.

== Professional career ==
After college, he was selected 184th overall by the Chiefs in the seventh round of the 1978 NFL draft. Kellar played five games for Kansas City wearing 82, but did not accumulate any statistics. He injured his knee in week 6 against Tampa Bay and was placed on injured reserve, missing the remainder of the season.
