= Charlie Ane III =

American football player (born 1952)

Charlie Ane
No. 56, 61
- Position: Center

Personal information
- Born: August 12, 1952 (age 74); Los Angeles, California, U.S.
- Listed height: 6 ft 1 in (1.85 m)
- Listed weight: 233 lb (106 kg)

Career information
- High school: Punahou School (Honolulu, Hawaii)
- College: Michigan State
- NFL draft: 1975: undrafted

Career history

Playing
- Kansas City Chiefs (1975–1980); Green Bay Packers (1981)

Coaching
- Punahou School (1998–2020) Head coach; McKinley HS (HI) (2021–2022) Head coach

Awards and highlights
- As head coach: 2× HHSAA State Champion (2008, 2013); 6× ILH Division I Titles (2005, 2008, 2011–2014); As player: Second-team All-Big Ten (1974)

Career NFL statistics
- Games: 105
- Stats at Pro Football Reference

Head coaching record
- Career: 149-74-1 (.667)

Charles "Kale" Teetai Ane III (born August 12, 1952) is an American former professional football player who was a center for seven seasons with the Kansas City Chiefs and the Green Bay Packers of the National Football League (NFL). He played college football for three seasons with the Michigan State Spartans.

== Life ==
He is the son of former NFL player Charley Ane. Now known as Kale Ane, he was the head football coach and assistant athletic director at the Punahou School in Honolulu, Hawaii, where both he and his father attended high school and played football.

== Head coaching record ==
| Year | Team | Overall | Conference | Standing | Bowl/playoffs |
|---|---|---|---|---|---|
Punahou Buffnblu (Interscholastic League of Honolulu Division I) (1998–present)
| 1998 | Punahou | 5-6-1 | 3-6-1 | 3rd | |
| 1999 | Punahou | 5-6 | 5-5 | 3rd | |
| 2000 | Punahou | 5-6 | 5-5 | 3rd | |
| 2001 | Punahou | 4-5 | 2-5 | 3rd | |
| 2002 | Punahou | 6-4 | 4-4 | 3rd | |
| 2003 | Punahou | 6-4 | 5-3 | T-2nd | |
| 2004 | Punahou | 5-5 | 3-4 | 3rd | |
| 2005 | Punahou | 11-3 | 6-2 | 1st | L HHSAA State Championship |
| 2006 | Punahou | 7-3 | 4-2 | T-2nd | |
| 2007 | Punahou | 7-2 | 5-2 | T-2nd | |
| 2008 | Punahou | 12-1 | 7-1 | 1st | W HHSAA State Championship |
| 2009 | Punahou | 5-5 | 4-3 | T-2nd | |
| 2010 | Punahou | 6-3 | 4-3 | T-2nd | |
| 2011 | Punahou | 11-3 | 7-1 | 1st | L HHSAA State Championship |
| 2012 | Punahou | 8-3 | 6-1 | 1st | L HHSAA State Championship |
| 2013 | Punahou | 11-0 | 7-0 | 1st | W HHSAA State Championship |
| 2014 | Punahou | 8-1 | 7-0 | 1st | L HHSAA State Championship |
| 2015 | Punahou | 8-2 | 5-2 | 2nd | |
| 2016 | Punahou | 7-3 | 6-2 | 2nd | L HHSAA 1st Round |
| 2017 | Punahou | 5-3 | 2-3 | 3rd | |
| 2018 | Punahou | 7-3 | 7-3 | 2nd | |
| Punahou: | | 149-74-1 | 97-57-1 | | |
| Total: | | 149-74-1 | | | |
National championship Conference title Conference division title or championship game berth
