= Thomas Howard Sr. =

American football player (born 1954)

Thomas Howard
No. 52, 59
- Position: Linebacker

Personal information
- Born: August 18, 1954 (age 72); Lubbock, Texas, U.S.
- Listed height: 6 ft 2 in (1.88 m)
- Listed weight: 213 lb (97 kg)

Career information
- College: Texas Tech
- NFL draft: 1977: 3rd round, 67th overall pick

Career history
- Kansas City Chiefs (1977–1983); St. Louis Cardinals (1984–1985)

Awards and highlights
- First-team All-American (1976); First-team All-SWC (1976)

Career NFL statistics
- Interceptions: 7
- Sacks: 4
- Fumble recoveries: 8
- Stats at Pro Football Reference

Thomas James Howard Sr. (born August 18, 1954) is an American former professional football player who was a linebacker for nine seasons in the National Football League (NFL). He played college football for the Texas Tech Red Raiders.

His son, Thomas Howard, played in the NFL as a linebacker for the Oakland Raiders, Cincinnati Bengals and Atlanta Falcons. The elder Howard wore the jersey number #52 for the Kansas City Chiefs and #59 for the St. Louis Cardinals. He returned 3 fumble recoveries for touchdowns: one in 1980 against the Denver Broncos, one in 1981 against the Pittsburgh Steelers, and one in 1984 against the New England Patriots.
