= Ted McKnight =

American football player (born 1954)

No. 22, 33
- Position: Running back

Personal information
- Born: February 26, 1954 (age 72); Duluth, Minnesota, U.S.
- Listed height: 6 ft 1 in (1.85 m)
- Listed weight: 209 lb (95 kg)

Career information
- High school: Central (Duluth)
- College: Minnesota–Duluth
- NFL draft: 1977: 2nd round, 56th overall pick

Career history
- Kansas City Chiefs (1977–1981); Buffalo Bills (1982)

Career NFL statistics
- Rushing attempts: 528
- Rushing yards: 2,344
- Rushing TDs: 22
- Stats at Pro Football Reference

Theodore "Touchdown Teddy" Robert McKnight (born February 26, 1954) is an American former professional football player who was a running back in the National Football League (NFL) for the Kansas City Chiefs and Buffalo Bills. He played college football for the Minnesota–Duluth Bulldogs and is one of six players to attend Minnesota-Duluth and play in the NFL. Of the six players, he had the longest NFL career.

McKnight was selected in the second round by the Oakland Raiders. Picked up by Kansas City, McKnight led the Chiefs in rushing in 1979 and 1980. He also led the Chiefs in receptions in 1979.

In 1978 McKnight led the NFL with a Chiefs record 6.0 yards per carry.

He finished his NFL career with 2,344 rushing yards and 23 total touchdowns. His longest run was 84 yards in 1979 and was a Chiefs record until 2012. McKnight also caught 99 passes out of the backfield. He finished his career with 3499 career all purpose yards.

He is inducted to the Missouri Sports Hall of Fame, University of Minnesota Duluth Hall of Fame.
