= Arnold Morgado =

American politician and American football player (born 1952)

- Born: March 27, 1952 (age 74); Honolulu, Hawaii, U.S.
- Education: University of Hawaii at Manoa; Michigan State University
- Spouse: Karen Morgado
- Football career

No. 22
- Position: Running back

Personal information
- Listed height: 5 ft 11 in (1.80 m)
- Listed weight: 204 lb (93 kg)

Career information
- High school: Punahou School (HI)
- College: Hawaii
- NFL draft: 1976: undrafted

Career history
- San Diego Chargers (1976)*; Kansas City Chiefs (1977–1980)
- * Offseason or practice squad member only

Career NFL statistics
- Rushing attempts: 285
- Rushing yards: 956
- Rushing TDs: 15
- Stats at Pro Football Reference

Chair of the Honolulu City Council
- In office January 2, 1987 – October 12, 1992
- Preceded by: Marilyn Bornhorst
- Succeeded by: Gary Gill

Member of the Honolulu City Council from the 8th district
- In office January 17, 1986 – July 26, 1994
- Preceded by: George G. Akahane
- Succeeded by: Boyd Andrade Sr.

Member of the Hawaii House of Representatives from the 43rd district 33rd (1982–1984)
- In office 1982–1985
- Succeeded by: David Ige

Personal details
- Party: Democratic

Arnold T. Morgado Jr. (born March 27, 1952) is a former professional football running back in the National Football League (NFL) for the Kansas City Chiefs. He graduated from Punahou School in 1971; in 1994, he was inducted into the Punahou Athletic Hall of Fame.

Morgado later entered politics, serving in the Hawaii House of Representatives and then on the Honolulu City Council as its chairman.

== See also ==
- Hōkūleʻa - Arnold Morgado sailed aboard her in 1987, from Papeʻete to Tautira, Tahiti, French Polynesia
