= Jerrold McRae =

American football player (born 1955)

No. 83, 82
- Position: Wide receiver

Personal information
- Born: April 9, 1955 (age 71); Laurel, Mississippi, U.S.
- Listed height: 6 ft 1 in (1.85 m)
- Listed weight: 194 lb (88 kg)

Career information
- High school: R.H. Watkins (Laurel)
- College: Tennessee State
- NFL draft: 1978: 5th round, 112th overall pick

Career history
- Kansas City Chiefs (1978); Philadelphia Eagles (1979)
- Stats at Pro Football Reference

Jerrold McRae (born April 9, 1955) is an American former professional football player who was a wide receiver in the National Football League (NFL). He played college football for the Tennessee State Tigers. He played in the NFL for the Kansas City Chiefs in 1978 and Philadelphia Eagles in 1979.
