= Tony Samuels =

American football player (1954–2001)

No. 81, 80, 89
- Position: Tight end

Personal information
- Born: December 30, 1954; Tampa, Florida, U.S.
- Died: September 12, 2001 (aged 46); Tampa, Florida, U.S.
- Listed height: 6 ft 4 in (1.93 m)
- Listed weight: 229 lb (104 kg)

Career information
- High school: Northeast (St. Petersburg, Florida)
- College: Florida A&M (1973); Bethune-Cookman (1974–1976)
- NFL draft: 1977: 4th round, 94th overall pick

Career history
- Kansas City Chiefs (1977–1980); Tampa Bay Buccaneers (1980–1981); Washington Federals (1983); Oklahoma Outlaws (1984)*; Tampa Bay Bandits (1985)*
- * Offseason or practice squad member only

Career NFL statistics
- Receptions: 33
- Receiving yards: 419
- Receiving TDs: 2
- Stats at Pro Football Reference

Andre Antonio Samuels (December 30, 1954 – September 12, 2001) was an American professional football tight end who played four seasons in the National Football League (NFL) with the Kansas City Chiefs and Tampa Bay Buccaneers. He was selected by the Chiefs in the fourth round of the 1977 NFL draft. He played college football at Florida A&M University and Bethune-Cookman University. He also played for the Washington Federals of the United States Football League (USFL).

== Early life and college ==
Andre Antonio Samuels was born on December 30, 1954, in Tampa, Florida. He attended Northeast High School in St. Petersburg, Florida.

Samuels was a member of the Florida A&M Rattlers of Florida A&M University in 1973 and the Bethune-Cookman Wildcats of Bethune-Cookman University from 1974 to 1976.

== Professional career ==
Samuels was selected by the Kansas City Chiefs in the fourth round, with the 94th overall pick, of the 1977 NFL draft. He played in all 14 games, starting two, for the Chiefs during his rookie year in 1977, catching five passes for 65 yards while also fumbling once. He appeared in all 16 games during the 1978 season, recording six receptions for 97 yards. Samuels played in all 16 games for the second consecutive season, starting a career-high 13, for the Chiefs in 1979, totaling 14 receptions for 147 yards, one fumble, and two fumbles recoveries, one of which was returned for a touchdown. The Chiefs finished the year with a 7–9 record. He started the Chiefs' first four games of the 1980 season, catching eight passes for 110 yards, before being released on October 1, 1980.

Samuels signed with the Tampa Bay Buccaneers on October 8, 1980. He appeared in six games, starting three, for the Buccaneers that year before being placed on injured reserve on December 10, 1980. He was placed on injured reserve again on August 17, 1981, and missed the entire 1981 season. Samuels was released on July 23, 1982, after failing a physical.

Samuels signed with the Washington Federals of the United States Football League (USFL) on April 13, 1983. He played in four games, starting three, for the Federals during the 1983 USFL season and caught one pass for 30 yards before being released on May 21, 1983.

Samuels was signed by the USFL's Oklahoma Outlaws on October 21, 1983. He was released on January 25, 1984.

Samuels signed with the Tampa Bay Bandits of the USFL on October 15, 1984, but was released on February 11, 1985.

== Personal life ==
Samuels died on September 12, 2001, in Tampa.
