= Charles Jackson (linebacker) =

American football player (born 1955)

No. 51, 55
- Position: Linebacker

Personal information
- Born: March 22, 1955 (age 71); Los Angeles, California, U.S.
- Listed height: 6 ft 2 in (1.88 m)
- Listed weight: 225 lb (102 kg)

Career information
- High school: Berkeley (Berkeley, California)
- College: Washington
- NFL draft: 1977: 9th round, 241st overall pick

Career history
- Denver Broncos (1977); Kansas City Chiefs (1978–1984); New York Jets (1985–1986)

Awards and highlights
- First-team All-Pac-8 (1976)

Career NFL statistics
- Interceptions: 1
- Sacks: 7
- Fumble recoveries: 11
- Stats at Pro Football Reference

Charles Melvin Jackson (born March 22, 1955) is an American former professional football player who was a linebacker in the National Football League (NFL). He played seven seasons for the Kansas City Chiefs from 1978 to 1984 and two seasons for the New York Jets from 1985 to 1986. He played college football for the Washington Huskies.
