= Ed Beckman =

American football player (born 1955)

No. 85
- Position: Tight end

Personal information
- Born: January 2, 1955 (age 71); Key West, Florida, U.S.
- Listed height: 6 ft 4 in (1.93 m)
- Listed weight: 229 lb (104 kg)

Career information
- High school: South Miami (FL)
- College: Florida State
- NFL draft: 1977: undrafted

Career history
- Kansas City Chiefs (1977–1984)

Career NFL statistics
- Receptions: 23
- Receiving yards: 198
- Touchdowns: 1
- Stats at Pro Football Reference

Edwin Jay Beckman (born January 2, 1955) is an American former professional football player who spent his entire eight-year career as a tight end for the Kansas City Chiefs of the National Football League (NFL) from 1977 to 1984. He played college football for the Florida State Seminoles. He became the special teams coach of the Chiefs in 1987.
