= Larry Canada =

American football player (born 1954)

No. 35
- Position: Running back

Personal information
- Born: December 16, 1954; Chicago, Illinois, U.S.
- Died: August 13, 2021 (aged 66); Illinois
- Listed height: 6 ft 2 in (1.88 m)
- Listed weight: 233 lb (106 kg)

Career information
- College: Wisconsin

Career history
- Denver Broncos (1978–1979, 1981); Denver Gold (1983); Chicago Blitz (1984); San Antonio Gunslingers (1985)

Career statistics
- Rushing attempts: 148
- Rushing yards: 621
- Receptions: 12
- Receiving yards: 110
- Kick returns: 5
- Touchdowns: 7
- Stats at Pro Football Reference

Lawrence Lavert "Larry" Canada, Jr. (December 16, 1954 – August 13, 2021) was an American professional football running back in the National Football League and United States Football League. He played for the Denver Broncos, Denver Gold, Chicago Blitz, and the San Antonio Gunslingers.

== Early life ==
Canada was born in Chicago, Illinois and attended Austin High School. He played college football at University of Wisconsin–Madison.

== Professional career ==
He played three seasons in the NFL with the Denver Broncos in 1978, 1979 and 1981. After leaving the NFL, he played in the United States Football League for the Denver Gold (1983), the Chicago Blitz (1984–1985) and the San Antonio Gunslingers (1985).
