= Horace Belton =

American gridiron football player (1955–2019)

Profile
- Position: Running back

Personal information
- Born: July 16, 1955; Baton Rouge, Louisiana, U.S.
- Died: May 28, 2019 (aged 63); Baton Rouge, Louisiana, U.S.

Career information
- High school: Scotlandville Magnet (LA)
- College: Southeastern Louisiana

Career history
- 1977: Montreal Alouettes
- 1978–80: Kansas City Chiefs

Awards and highlights
- Grey Cup champion (1977)
- Stats at Pro Football Reference

Horace Belton (July 16, 1955 – May 28, 2019) was a Canadian Football League (CFL) and National Football League (CFL) running back and Grey Cup champion.

Belton played his college football at Southeastern Louisiana University and began his career in 1977, playing only 2 regular season games for the Montreal Alouettes (rushing for 126 yards). He played in the 1977 Grey Cup, with 12 carries for 36 yards and 4 receptions for 30 yards. He then played 3 seasons with the Kansas City Chiefs, as a running back and kick returner, rushing for 486 total yards.

He died on May 28, 2019, aged 63.
