= Tim Collier =

American football player (born 1954)

No. 44, 47
- Position: Cornerback

Personal information
- Born: May 31, 1954 (age 72); Dallas, Texas, U.S.
- Listed height: 6 ft 0 in (1.83 m)
- Listed weight: 172 lb (78 kg)

Career information
- High school: South Oak Cliff
- College: East Texas State
- NFL draft: 1976: 9th round, 249th overall pick

Career history
- Kansas City Chiefs (1976–1979); St. Louis Cardinals (1980–1982); San Francisco 49ers (1982-1983)

Awards and highlights
- As player: Super Bowl champion (XIX); Lone Star Conference champion (1972); NAIA Division I national champion (1972); NAIA first-team All-American (1975); 3× First-team All-LSC (1973, 1974, 1975); Texas A&M-Commerce Athletic Hall of Fame (1996)

Career NFL statistics
- Interceptions: 15
- Fumble recoveries: 1
- Defensive TDs: 2
- Stats at Pro Football Reference

Timothy Collier Jr. (born May 31, 1954) is an American former professional football player who was a cornerback for 10 seasons in the National Football League (NFL), where he was a member of the Kansas City Chiefs, St. Louis Cardinals, and the San Francisco 49ers, with whom he a won a Super Bowl championship with during the 1984 season. He played college football for the East Texas State Lions (now Texas A&M University-Commerce), where he was both a three-time All-American and all-conference selection, and an NAIA national champion in 1972.

== Early life ==
Collier grew up in Dallas, Texas, and attended Dallas's South Oak Cliff High School with future Super Bowl MVP and East Texas State teammate Harvey Martin. He was a standout in multiple sports, and most notably in football and track and field. He graduated from South Oak Cliff in 1972 and took a scholarship to East Texas State, an NAIA program, to play football and run track and field.

== College career ==
=== Freshman season ===
Collier played as a true freshman for the 1972 East Texas State Lions Football Team, who finished 10-2 and won the NAIA Division I National Championship that year. As a reserve defensive back, he tallied 525 all purpose yards, including 2 interceptions on the season and also served as a punt returner for the Lions.

=== Sophomore season ===
As a sophomore, Collier became a full time starter for the Lions. He was second on the team in total defense, recording 4 interceptions to go along with 9 punt returns for 98 yards, 4 kickoff returns for 138 yards and a touchdown. He was named to the Lone Star Conference First-team and also named an Honorable Mention All-American by the Associated Press. The 1973 Lions finished 7-4.

=== Junior season ===
Collier once again repeated as a first-team all LSC performer and was again named to the Associated Press's All-American team as an Honorable Mention. He led the team in both punt returns and kickoff returns, along with 512 all-purpose yards, helping propel the Lions to their third straight winning season with a 7-4-1 record.

=== Senior season ===
In his final collegiate season, Collier was named first-team all conference once more, and was named to the NAIA First-team All-American as ETSU finished 8-3. He once again led the team in kickoff returns and was second in overall defense, to go along with 3 interceptions. Collier's career was one of the 10 players discussed in a 2013 article that tried to identify the best football players in the 80-year history of the ETSU/A&M-Commerce football program.

== Professional career ==
=== Kansas City ===
Collier was selected by the Kansas City Chiefs in the 9th round of the 1976 NFL Draft. He spent 4 seasons with the Chiefs and played cornerback in 52 games for Kansas City, starting 22 of them. During his time there he recorded 9 interceptions and returned them for 227 yards, including a 100 yard return for a touchdown in 1977. After the 1979 season, he was traded to the St. Louis Cardinals.

=== St. Louis ===
After signing with the St. Louis Cardinals, Collier played in 30 games with 11 starts, tallying 3 interceptions for 39 returns yards. He was traded halfway through the 1982 season and signed with the San Francisco 49ers.

=== San Francisco ===
Collier finished out his career with the San Francisco 49ers from 1982-1984. He was hampered by injuries, causing him to only see action in 12 games and make 5 starts during that time. He was however, a member of the 1984 San Francisco team that won Super Bowl XIX as he spent that season rehabbing an injury and was put on the injured reserved list. After the 1984 season, Collier retired from the NFL.

== Personal ==
Collier is married and lives in Fresno, California with his wife Cindy of more than 30 years. They have 2 children and 4 grandchildren.
