= Daniel Johnson (linebacker) =

American football player (born 1955)

No. 58
- Position: Linebacker

Personal information
- Born: May 7, 1955 (age 71); Normandy, Tennessee, U.S.
- Listed height: 6 ft 1 in (1.85 m)
- Listed weight: 215 lb (98 kg)

Career information
- High school: Shelbyville (Shelbyville, Tennessee)
- College: Tennessee State
- NFL draft: 1978: 5th round, 85th overall pick

Career history
- Green Bay Packers (1978)

Career NFL statistics
- Games played: 3
- Stats at Pro Football Reference

Daniel Johnson (born May 7, 1955) is an American former professional football player who was a linebacker in the National Football League (NFL). He played college football for the Tennessee State Tigers and was selected by the Kansas City Chiefs in the fourth round of the 1978 NFL draft. He would play that season with the Green Bay Packers.
