= Sylvester Hicks =

American football player (born 1955)

No. 75
- Position: Defensive end

Personal information
- Born: April 2, 1955 (age 71); Jackson, Tennessee, U.S.
- Listed height: 6 ft 4 in (1.93 m)
- Listed weight: 251 lb (114 kg)

Career information
- High school: North Side (Jackson)
- College: Tennessee State (1973–1976)
- NFL draft: 1978: 2nd round, 29th overall pick

Career history
- Kansas City Chiefs (1978–1981)

Career NFL statistics
- Sacks: 8.5
- Fumble recoveries: 1
- Stats at Pro Football Reference

Sylvester Hicks (born April 2, 1955) is an American former professional football player who was a defensive end for four seasons with the Kansas City Chiefs of the National Football League (NFL). He was selected by the Chiefs in the second round of the 1978 NFL draft after playing college football for the Tennessee State Tigers.

== Early life and college ==
Sylvester Hicks was born April 2, 1955, in Jackson, Tennessee. He attended North Side High School in Jackson.

Hicks was a member of the Tennessee State Tigers of Tennessee State University from 1973 to 1976 and a three-year letterman from 1974 to 1976.

== Professional career ==
Hicks was selected by the Kansas City Chiefs in the second round, with the 29th overall pick, of the 1978 NFL draft. He officially signed with the team on May 29. He started all 16 games for the Chiefs during his rookie year in 1978, recording 5.5 sacks and one fumble recovery. The Chiefs finished the season with a 4–12 record. Hicks played in all 16 games for the second consecutive season, starting 13, in 1979, and posted two sacks. He was placed on injured reserve on September 9, 1980, but later activated on October 11, 1980. Overall, he appeared in ten games for the Chiefs during the 1980 season and made one sack. Hicks was released by the Chiefs the next year on August 18, 1981, but re-signed on September 24, 1981. He played in one game for the Chiefs during the 1981 season before being placed on injured reserve again on October 9, 1981. He became a free agent after the season.
