= 1984 Kansas City Chiefs season =

NFL team season

- Owner: Lamar Hunt
- General manager: Jim Schaaf
- Head coach: John Mackovic
- Home stadium: Arrowhead Stadium

Results
- Record: 8–8
- Division place: 4th AFC West
- Playoffs: Did not qualify
- All-Pros: 3: DE Art Still (2nd team); S Deron Cherry (1st team); P Jim Arnold (2nd team)
- Pro Bowlers: 2: DE Art Still; S Deron Cherry

The 1984 Kansas City Chiefs season was the franchise's 15th season in the National Football League, the 22nd as the Kansas City Chiefs, and the 25th overall.

Pro Bowl safety Gary Barbaro became the most notable Chiefs player to defect to the rival United States Football League, signing with the New Jersey Generals on February 2 after sitting out the entire 1983 campaign due to a contract dispute. Barbaro's departure and the trade of cornerback Gary Green began a youth movement that produced the most vaunted secondary in team history. Cornerbacks Kevin Ross and Albert Lewis, and safeties Deron Cherry and Lloyd Burruss accounted for a combined 13 Pro Bowl appearances for the Chiefs in the years to come.

All-America defensive tackle Bill Maas and offensive tackle John Alt were both selected in the first round of the 1984 NFL draft. Maas was named NFL Defensive Rookie of the Year, while Alt eventually became the cornerstone of the club's offensive line later in the decade. Kansas City's defense registered a team-record 11 sacks in a 10–6 win against Cleveland on September 30, coming one sack shy of the NFL single-game record.

Quarterback Bill Kenney suffered a broken thumb during the preseason and was sidelined until the season's seventh week. Second-year backup Quarterback Todd Blackledge opened the first six contests of the season and had the club at 3–3. Kenney returned to the starting lineup against the New York Jets on October 21, but inconsistency marked the rest of the season as the club dropped four of first five contests after his return. However, the team rattled off three consecutive wins to conclude the year at 8–8.

The Chiefs were also involved in infamy during the Week 10 game against the Seattle Seahawks, in which the Chiefs quarterbacks threw six interceptions, four of which were returned for touchdowns in a 45–0 loss.

== Offseason ==
=== NFL draft ===
1984 Kansas City Chiefs draft
Round	Selection	Player	Position	College
1	5	Bill Maas	Defensive tackle	Pittsburgh
1	21	John Alt	Tackle	Iowa
2	34	Scott Radecic	Linebacker	Penn State
3	61	Herman Heard	Running back	Southern Colorado
4	90	Mark Robinson	Safety	Penn State
5	117	Eric Holle	Defensive end	Texas
5	134	Jeff Paine	Linebacker	Texas A&M
6	146	Rufus Stevens	Wide receiver	Grambling State
7	173	Kevin Ross	Cornerback	Temple
8	202	Randy Clark	Defensive back	Florida
9	229	Scott Auer	Tackle	Michigan State
9	240	Dave Hestera	Tight end	Colorado
10	258	Al Wenglikowski	Linebacker	Pittsburgh
11	285	Bobby Johnson	Running back	San Jose State

=== Undrafted free agents ===
1984 undrafted free agents of note
Player	Position	College
Don Bracken	Punter	Michigan
David Little	Tight End	Middle Tennessee State

== Personnel ==
=== Staff ===
1984 Kansas City Chiefs staff
Front office: Founder – Lamar Hunt; President – Jack Steadman; Vice-president and general manager – Jim Schaaf; Director of player personnel – Les Miller; Head coaches: Head coach – John Mackovic; Offensive coaches: Quarterbacks – Pete McCulley; Offensive backs – Willie Peete; Receivers – Richard Williamson; Offensive Line/run game coordinator – Rod Humenuik; Offensive quality control – JD Helm	Defensive coaches: Defensive coordinator/inside linebackers – Dan Daniel; Defensive line – Walt Corey; Outside linebackers – Jim Vechiarella; Defensive backs/quality control – Doug Graber; Defensive quality control – Dave Brazil; Special teams coaches: Special teams – Jim Vechiarella; Strength and conditioning: Strength and Conditioning – CT Hewgley

=== Roster ===
1984 Kansas City Chiefs roster
Quarterbacks (QB): 14 Todd Blackledge; 9 Bill Kenney; 11 Sandy Osiecki; Running backs (RB): 27 Theotis Brown; 38 Michael Gunter; 44 Herman Heard; 43 Billy Jackson; 40 Ken Lacy; Wide receivers (WR): 88 Carlos Carson; 82 Anthony Hancock; 89 Henry Marshall; 83 Stephone Paige; Tight ends (TE): 87 Walt Arnold; 85 Ed Beckman; 81 Willie Scott	Offensive linemen (OL): 76 John Alt T; 68 Scott Auer G; 77 Rich Baldinger G/T; 66 Brad Budde G; 65 Tom Condon G; 60 Matt Herkenhoff T; 62 Adam Lingner C; 72 Dave Lutz T; 70 Jim Rourke T; 53 Bob Rush C; Defensive linemen (DL): 73 Mike Dawson NT; 93 Eric Holle DE; 91 Ken Kremer NT; 71 Dave Lindstrom DE; 63 Bill Maas NT; 67 Art Still DE	Linebackers (LB): 57 Jerry Blanton ILB; 50 Calvin Daniels OLB; 52 Ken Jolly OLB; 94 Ken McAlister OLB; 95 Jeff Paine OLB; 97 Scott Radecic ILB; 59 Gary Spani ILB; 91 John Zamberlin ILB; Defensive backs (DB): 34 Lloyd Burruss SS; 20 Deron Cherry FS; 23 Greg Hill CB; 22 Van Jakes CB/S; 26 Skip Lane CB/S; 21 Kerry Parker CB; 30 Mark Robinson SS; 31 Kevin Ross CB; Special teams (ST): 6 Jim Arnold P; 8 Nick Lowery K	Reserve: 99 Mike Bell DE (IR); 51 Charles Jackson LB (Left squad); -- Mark Lang LB (IR); 29 Albert Lewis CB (IR); 84 David Little TE (IR); 86 J. T. Smith WR (IR); -- Rufus Stevens WR (IR); 35 Ken Thomas RB (IR); 92 Ray Yakavonis NT (IR); Rookies in italics

== Preseason ==
Week	Date	Opponent	Result	Record	Venue	Attendance	Recap
1	August 4	New Orleans Saints	L 20–34	0–1	Arrowhead Stadium	34,230	Recap
2	August 10	at St. Louis Cardinals	L 10–14	0–2	Busch Memorial Stadium	30,223	Recap
3	August 18	Cleveland Browns	W 31–13	1–2	Arrowhead Stadium	33,074	Recap
4	August 24	at New England Patriots	L 7–36	1–3	Sullivan Stadium	22,721	Recap

== Regular season ==
=== Schedule ===
Week	Date	Opponent	Result	Record	Venue	Attendance	Recap
1	September 2	at Pittsburgh Steelers	**W** 37–27	1–0	Three Rivers Stadium	56,709	Recap
2	September 9	at Cincinnati Bengals	**W** 27–22	2–0	Riverfront Stadium	47,111	Recap
3	September 16	**Los Angeles Raiders**	**L** 20–22	2–1	Arrowhead Stadium	75,111	Recap
4	September 23	at **Denver Broncos**	**L** 0–21	2–2	Mile High Stadium	74,263	Recap
5	September 30	Cleveland Browns	**W** 10–6	3–2	Arrowhead Stadium	40,785	Recap
6	October 7	New York Jets	**L** 16–17	3–3	Arrowhead Stadium	51,843	Recap
7	October 14	**San Diego Chargers**	**W** 31–13	4–3	Arrowhead Stadium	62,233	Recap
8	October 21	at New York Jets	**L** 7–28	4–4	Giants Stadium	66,782	Recap
9	October 28	Tampa Bay Buccaneers	**W** 24–20	5–4	Arrowhead Stadium	41,710	Recap
10	November 4	at **Seattle Seahawks**	**L** 0–45	5–5	Kingdome	61,396	Recap
11	November 11	Houston Oilers	**L** 16–17	5–6	Arrowhead Stadium	44,464	Recap
12	November 18	at **Los Angeles Raiders**	**L** 7–17	5–7	Los Angeles Memorial Coliseum	48,575	Recap
13	November 25	at New York Giants	**L** 27–28	5–8	Giants Stadium	74,383	Recap
14	December 2	**Denver Broncos**	**W** 16–13	6–8	Arrowhead Stadium	38,494	Recap
15	December 9	**Seattle Seahawks**	**W** 34–7	7–8	Arrowhead Stadium	34,855	Recap
16	December 16	at **San Diego Chargers**	**W** 42–21	8–8	Jack Murphy Stadium	40,221	Recap
Note: Intra-division opponents are in **bold** text.

=== Game summaries ===
==== Week 1: at Pittsburgh Steelers ====
Week 1: Kansas City Chiefs at Pittsburgh Steelers – Game summary

Quarter	1	2	3	4	Total
**Chiefs**	7	17	13	0	**37**
Steelers	3	14	3	7	**27**

at Three Rivers Stadium, Pittsburgh, Pennsylvania

- Date: September 2
- Game time: 1:00 p.m. EDT
- Game weather: Sunny, 78 °F (26 °C)
- Game attendance: 56,709
- Referee: Jerry Seeman
- TV announcers (NBC): Bill Wilkerson and Dave Rowe
- Recap, Game Book

Game information

**First quarter**

- KC – Todd Blackledge 1-yard run (Nick Lowery kick), 9:44. Chiefs 7–0. **Drive: 6 plays, 42 yards, 1:58.**
- PIT – Gary Anderson 30-yard field goal, 4:22. Chiefs 7–3. **Drive: 5 plays, 33 yards, 5:21.**

**Second quarter**

- KC – Nick Lowery 37-yard field goal, 13:49. Chiefs 10–3. **Drive: 12 plays, 62 yards, 5:22.**
- KC – Theotis Brown 3-yard run (Nick Lowery kick), 12:05. Chiefs 17–3. **Drive: 3 plays, 22 yards, 0:59.**
- PIT – Louis Lipps 80-yard pass from David Woodley (Gary Anderson kick), 8:07. Chiefs 17–10. **Drive: 1 play, 80 yards, 0:13.**
- KC – Theotis Brown 6-yard run (Nick Lowery kick), 4:46. Chiefs 24–10. **Drive: 4 plays, 19 yards, 1:32.**
- PIT – John Stallworth 29-yard pass from David Woodley (Gary Anderson kick), 0:33. Chiefs 24–17. **Drive: 3 plays, 65 yards, 0:25.**

**Third quarter**

- PIT – Gary Anderson 47-yard field goal, 12:56. Chiefs 24–20. **Drive: 4 plays, 0 yards, 1:47.**
- KC – Stephone Paige 22-yard pass from Todd Blackledge (Nick Lowery kick), 7:57. Chiefs 31–20. **Drive: 11 plays, 80 yards, 4:59.**
- KC – Nick Lowery 47-yard field goal, 6:47. Chiefs 34–20. **Drive: 4 plays, 5 yards, 0:25.**
- KC – Nick Lowery 37-yard field goal 4:36. Chiefs 37–20. **Drive: 4 plays, 1 yard, 1:44.**

**Fourth quarter**

- PIT – Louis Lipps 21-yard pass from Mark Malone (Gary Anderson kick), 0:23. Chiefs 37–27. **Drive: 6 plays, 59 yards, 1:03.**

**Top passers**

- KC – Todd Blackledge – 19/36, 170 yards, TD
- PIT – Mark Malone – 11/24, 233 yards, 2 TD, INT

**Top rushers**

- KC – Theotis Brown – 17 rushes, 58 yards
- PIT – Frank Pollard – 11 rushes, 28 yards

**Top receivers**

- KC – Carlos Carson – 4 receptions, 37 yards
- PIT – Louis Lipps – 6 receptions, 183 yards, 2 TD

==== Week 2: at Cincinnati Bengals ====
Week 2: Kansas City Chiefs at Cincinnati Bengals – Game summary

Quarter	1	2	3	4	Total
**Chiefs**	7	7	10	3	**27**
Bengals	0	14	3	5	**22**

at Riverfront Stadium, Cincinnati, Ohio

- Date: September 9
- Game time: 1:00 p.m. EDT
- Game weather: 69 °F (21 °C)
- Game attendance: 47,111
- Referee: Jerry Markbreit
- TV announcers (NBC): Todd Donoho and Gene Washington
- Recap

Game information

**First quarter**

- KC – Theotis Brown 5-yard run (Nick Lowery kick), 10:40. Chiefs 7–0.

**Second quarter**

- KC – Anthony Hancock 46-yard pass from Todd Blackledge (Nick Lowery kick), 12:56. Chiefs 14–0.
- CIN – Ray Horton 48-yard interception return (Jim Breech kick), 11:02. Chiefs 14–7.
- CIN – Charles Alexander 2-yard run (Jim Breech kick), 6:22. Tied 14–14.

**Third quarter**

- CIN – Jim Breech 48-yard field goal, 9:05. Bengals 17–14.
- KC – Carlos Carson 29-yard pass from Todd Blackledge (Nick Lowery kick), 5:31. Chiefs 21–17.
- KC – Nick Lowery 52-yard field goal, 4:55. Chiefs 24–17.

**Fourth quarter**

- CIN – Todd Blackledge fumble out of bounds in end zone for a Safety, 10:53. Chiefs 24–19.
- CIN – Jim Breech 29-yard field goal, 5:10. Chiefs 24–22.
- KC – Nick Lowery 40-yard field goal, 1:50. Chiefs 27–22.

**Top passers**

- KC – Todd Blackledge – 18/35, 270 yards, 2 TD, INT
- CIN – Ken Anderson – 24/37, 310 yards

**Top rushers**

- KC – Theotis Brown – 14 rushes, 48 yards, TD
- CIN – Charles Alexander – 11 rushes, 44 yards, TD

**Top receivers**

- KC – Anthony Hancock – 3 receptions, 109 yards, TD
- CIN – Cris Collinsworth – 5 receptions, 96 yards

==== Week 3: vs. Los Angeles Raiders ====
Week 3: Los Angeles Raiders at Kansas City Chiefs – Game summary

Quarter	1	2	3	4	Total
**Raiders**	0	3	6	13	**22**
Chiefs	3	10	0	7	**20**

at Arrowhead Stadium, Kansas City, Missouri

- Date: September 16
- Game time: 12:00 p.m. CDT
- Game weather: Sunny and Clear, 64 °F (18 °C)
- Game attendance: 75,111
- Referee: Jim Tunney
- TV announcers (NBC): Dick Enberg and Merlin Olsen
- Recap, Game Book

Game information

**First quarter**

- KC – Nick Lowery 29-yard field goal, 7:11. Chiefs 3–0. **Drive: 9 plays, 47 yards, 4:24.**

**Second quarter**

- KC – Kevin Ross 71-yard interception return (Nick Lowery kick), 5:16. Chiefs 10–0.
- KC – Nick Lowery 27-yard field goal, 1:47. Chiefs 13–0. **Drive: 6 plays, 82 yards, 1:35.**
- RAI – Chris Bahr 43-yard field goal, 0:00. Chiefs 13–3. **Drive: 10 plays, 80 yards, 1:47.**

**Third quarter**

- RAI – Todd Christensen 3-yard pass from Jim Plunkett (kick blocked), 3:53. Chiefs 13–9. **Drive: 10 plays, 80 yards, 3:30.**

**Fourth quarter**

- RAI – Frank Hawkins 1-yard run (Chris Bahr kick), 14:04. Raiders 16–13. **Drive: 7 plays, 68 yards, 0:56.**
- RAI – Chris Bahr 24-yard field goal, 8:07. Raiders 19–13. **Drive: 6 plays, 32 yards, 2:43.**
- KC – Herman Heard 5-yard run (Nick Lowery kick), 4:44. Chiefs 20–19. **Drive: 6 plays, 45 yards, 2:01.**
- RAI – Chris Bahr 19-yard field goal, 1:00. Raiders 22–20. **Drive: 13 plays, 73 yards, 3:44.**

**Top passers**

- RAI – Jim Plunkett – 28/47, 313 yards, TD, 4 INT
- KC – Todd Blackledge – 17/37, 187 yards, 2 INT

**Top rushers**

- RAI – Marcus Allen – 22 rushes, 69 yards
- KC – Theotis Brown – 12 rushes, 44 yards

**Top receivers**

- RAI – Malcolm Barnwell – 8 receptions, 129 yards
- KC – Carlos Carson – 5 receptions, 66 yards

==== Week 4: at Denver Broncos ====
Week 4: Kansas City Chiefs at Denver Broncos – Game summary

Quarter	1	2	3	4	Total
Chiefs	0	0	0	0	**0**
**Broncos**	0	14	7	0	**21**

at Mile High Stadium, Denver, Colorado

- Date: September 23
- Game time: 2:00 p.m. MDT
- Game weather: Mostly Sunny, 84 °F (29 °C)
- Game attendance: 74,263
- Referee: Tom Dooley
- TV announcers (NBC): Jay Randolph and Gene Washington
- Recap, Game Book

Game information

**First quarter**

- No scoring plays.

**Second quarter**

- DEN – Sammy Winder 6-yard run (Rich Karlis kick), 10:33. Broncos 7–0. **Drive: 7 plays, 80 yards, 2:02.**
- DEN – Rick Parros 3-yard run (Rich Karlis kick), 2:23. Broncos 14–0. **Drive: 7 plays, 80 yards, 3:25.**

**Third quarter**

- DEN – Mike Harden 45-yard interception return (Rich Karlis kick), 4:47. Broncos 21–0.

**Fourth quarter**

- No scoring plays.

**Top passers**

- KC – Todd Blackledge – 23/48, 295 yards, 2 INT
- DEN – John Elway – 17/29, 172 yards, 2 INT

**Top rushers**

- KC – Theotis Brown – 10 rushes, 36 yards
- DEN – Sammy Winder – 31 rushes, 139 yards, TD

**Top receivers**

- KC – Henry Marshall – 8 receptions, 148 yards
- DEN – Steve Watson – 7 receptions, 93 yards

==== Week 5: vs. Cleveland Browns ====
Week 5: Cleveland Browns at Kansas City Chiefs – Game summary

Quarter	1	2	3	4	Total
Browns	0	3	3	0	**6**
**Chiefs**	0	3	0	7	**10**

at Arrowhead Stadium, Kansas City, Missouri

- Date: September 30
- Game time: 12:00 p.m. CDT
- Game weather: Clear, 59 °F (15 °C)
- Game attendance: 40,785
- Referee: Ben Dreith
- TV announcers (NBC): Phil Stone and Reggie Rucker
- Recap, Game Book

Game information

**First quarter**

- No scoring plays.

**Second quarter**

- CLE – Matt Bahr 34-yard field goal, 4:29. Browns 3–0. **Drive: 10 plays, 63 yards, 3:20.**
- KC – Nick Lowery 42-yard field goal, 0:03. Tied 3–3. **Drive: 6 plays, 19 yards, 0:40.**

**Third quarter**

- CLE – Matt Bahr 23-yard field goal, 4:33. Browns 6–3. **Drive: 4 plays, 4 yards, 1:31.**

**Fourth quarter**

- KC – Billy Jackson 9-yard pass from Todd Blackledge (Nick Lowery kick), 11:02. Chiefs 10–6. **Drive: 7 plays, 63 yards, 3:46.**

**Top passers**

- CLE – Paul McDonald – 17/38, 186 yards, 4 INT
- KC – Todd Blackledge – 15/33, 155 yards, TD, 2 INT

**Top rushers**

- CLE – Mike Pruitt – 20 rushes, 67 yards
- KC – Theotis Brown – 13 rushes, 35 yards

**Top receivers**

- CLE – Ozzie Newsome – 7 receptions, 74 yards
- KC – Henry Marshall – 4 receptions, 63 yards

==== Week 6: vs. New York Jets ====
Week 6: New York Jets at Kansas City Chiefs – Game summary

Quarter	1	2	3	4	Total
**Jets**	0	10	7	0	**17**
Chiefs	6	3	0	7	**16**

at Arrowhead Stadium, Kansas City, Missouri

- Date: October 7
- Game time: 12:00 p.m. CDT
- Game weather: Sunny, 73 °F (23 °C)
- Game attendance: 51,843
- Referee: Fred Wyant
- TV announcers (NBC): Marv Albert and John Brodie
- Recap, Game Book

Game information

**First quarter**

- KC – Nick Lowery 31-yard field goal, 10:08. Chiefs 3–0. **Drive: 10 plays, 62 yards, 4:52.**
- KC – Nick Lowery 42-yard field goal, 1:12. Chiefs 6–0. **Drive: 11 plays, 64 yards, 5:28.**

**Second quarter**

- KC – Nick Lowery 21-yard field goal, 6:57. Chiefs 9–0. **Drive: 12 plays, 77 yards, 6:24.**
- NYJ – Pat Leahy 37-yard field goal, 2:23. Chiefs 9–3. **Drive: 10 plays, 61 yards, 4:34.**
- NYJ – Tony Paige 1-yard run (Pat Leahy kick), 0:31. Jets 10–9. **Drive: 5 plays, 20 yards, 1:41.**

**Third quarter**

- NYJ – Mickey Shuler 15-yard pass from Pat Ryan (Pat Leahy kick), 11:01. Jets 17–9. **Drive: 9 plays, 76 yards, 3:59.**

**Fourth quarter**

- KC – Willie Scott 1-yard pass from Todd Blackledge (Nick Lowery kick), 4:42. Jets 17–16. **Drive: 13 plays, 80 yards, 7:01.**

**Top passers**

- NYJ – Pat Ryan – 13/23, 158 yards, TD, INT
- KC – Todd Blackledge – 15/25, 150 yards, TD

**Top rushers**

- NYJ – Freeman McNeil – 19 rushes, 107 yards
- KC – Theotis Brown – 13 rushes, 90 yards

**Top receivers**

- NYJ – Wesley Walker – 5 receptions, 66 yards
- KC – Stephone Paige – 2 receptions, 46 yards

==== Week 7: vs. San Diego Chargers ====
Week 7: San Diego Chargers at Kansas City Chiefs – Game summary

Quarter	1	2	3	4	Total
Chargers	3	3	7	0	**13**
**Chiefs**	10	0	7	14	**31**

at Arrowhead Stadium, Kansas City, Missouri

- Date: October 14
- Game time: 12:00 p.m. CDT
- Game weather: Overcast, 71 °F (22 °C)
- Game attendance: 62,233
- Referee: Fred Silva
- TV announcers (NBC): Don Criqui and Merlin Olsen
- Recap, Game Book

Game information

**First quarter**

- KC – Ken Lacy 24-yard run (Nick Lowery kick), 13:14. Chiefs 7–0. **Drive: 5 plays, 75 yards, 1:46.**
- SD – Benny Ricardo 38-yard field goal, 9:57. Chiefs 7–3. **Drive: 9 plays, 44 yards, 3:17.**
- KC – Nick Lowery 22-yard field goal, 2:17. Chiefs 10–3. **Drive: 8 plays, 54 yards, 2:44.**

**Second quarter**

- SD – Benny Ricardo 42-yard field goal, 10:58. Chiefs 10–6. **Drive: 13 plays, 56 yards, 6:19.**

**Third quarter**

- SD – Gill Byrd 99-yard interception return (Benny Ricardo kick), 5:56. Chargers 13–10.
- KC – Stephone Paige 18-yard pass from Bill Kenney (Nick Lowery kick), 4:20. Chiefs 17–13. **Drive: 4 plays, 71 yards, 1:36.**

**Fourth quarter**

- KC – Ed Beckman 5-yard pass from Bill Kenney (Nick Lowery kick), 7:01. Chiefs 24–13. **Drive: 9 plays, 58 yards, 4:39.**
- KC – Herman Heard 69-yard run (Nick Lowery kick), 4:37. Chiefs 31–13. **Drive: 1 play, 69 yards, 0:12.**

**Top passers**

- SD – Dan Fouts – 30/46, 270 yards, 2 INT
- KC – Bill Kenney – 13/22, 238 yards, 2 TD, 2 INT

**Top rushers**

- SD – Earnest Jackson – 16 rushes, 68 yards
- KC – Herman Heard – 7 rushes, 84 yards, TD

**Top receivers**

- SD – Wes Chandler – 8 receptions, 93 yards
- KC – Carlos Carson – 7 receptions, 165 yards

==== Week 8: at New York Jets ====
Week 8: Kansas City Chiefs at New York Jets – Game summary

Quarter	1	2	3	4	Total
Chiefs	0	0	0	7	**7**
**Jets**	7	7	7	7	**28**

at Giants Stadium, East Rutherford, New Jersey

- Date: October 21
- Game time: 4:00 p.m. EDT
- Game weather: Cloudy and Humid, 64 °F (18 °C)
- Game attendance: 66,782
- Referee: Jerry Seeman
- TV announcers (NBC): Marv Albert and John Brodie
- Recap, Game Book

Game information

**First quarter**

- NYJ – Bobby Humphery 44-yard pass from Pat Ryan (Pat Leahy kick), 11:14. Jets 7–0. **Drive: 7 plays, 76 yards, 3:35.**

**Second quarter**

- NYJ – Mickey Shuler 16-yard pass from Pat Ryan (Pat Leahy kick), 0:54. Jets 14–0. **Drive: 7 plays, 39 yards, 0:59.**

**Third quarter**

- NYJ – Mark Gastineau fumble recovery in end zone (Pat Ryan run), 11:22. Jets 21–0.

**Fourth quarter**

- KC – Ken Lacy 7-yard pass from Bill Kenney (Nick Lowery kick), 13:55. Jets 21–7. **Drive: 7 plays, 84 yards, 2:09.**
- NYJ – Cedric Minter 39-yard pass from Pat Ryan (Pat Leahy kick), 6:37. Jets 28–7. **Drive: 11 plays, 93 yards, 7:08.**

**Top passers**

- KC – Bill Kenney – 12/25, 124 yards, TD, INT
- NYJ – Pat Ryan – 21/31, 260 yards, 3 TD

**Top rushers**

- KC – Herman Heard – 13 rushes, 69 yards
- NYJ – Johnny Hector – 23 rushes, 58 yards

**Top receivers**

- KC – Henry Marshall – 2 receptions, 33 yards
- NYJ – Mickey Shuler – 7 receptions, 58 yards, TD

==== Week 9: vs. Tampa Bay Buccaneers ====
Week 9: Tampa Bay Buccaneers at Kansas City Chiefs – Game summary

Quarter	1	2	3	4	Total
Buccaneers	0	7	6	7	**20**
**Chiefs**	0	7	7	10	**24**

at Arrowhead Stadium, Kansas City, Missouri

- Date: October 28
- Game time: 12:00 p.m. CST
- Game weather: Overcast, 42 °F (6 °C)
- Game attendance: 41,710
- Referee: Red Cashion
- TV announcers (CBS): Jim Kelly and Drew Pearson
- Recap, Game Book

Game information

**First quarter**

- No scoring plays.

**Second quarter**

- KC – Ken Lacy 2-yard run (Nick Lowery kick), 10:58. Chiefs 7–0. **Drive: 8 plays, 45 yards, 3:04.**
- TB – Kevin House 7-yard pass from Steve DeBerg (Obed Ariri kick), 2:21. Tied 7–7. **Drive: 4 plays, 27 yards, 0:59.**

**Third quarter**

- KC – Ken Lacy 5-yard pass from Bill Kenney (Nick Lowery kick), 11:04. Chiefs 14–7. **Drive: 3 plays, 61 yards, 1:54.**
- TB – Obed Ariri 34-yard field goal, 6:33. Chiefs 14–10. **Drive: 11 plays, 63 yards, 4:31.**
- TB – Obed Ariri 25-yard field goal, 0:21. Chiefs 14–13. **Drive: 11 plays, 58 yards, 4:31.**

**Fourth quarter**

- KC – Henry Marshall 27-yard pass from Bill Kenney (Nick Lowery kick), 9:29. Chiefs 21–13. **Drive: 6 plays, 76 yards, 3:00.**
- KC – Nick Lowery 47-yard field goal, 7:11. Chiefs 24–13. **Drive: 5 plays, 12 yards, 0:24.**
- TB – Scott Dierking 5-yard pass from Steve DeBerg (Obed Ariri kick), 4:07. Chiefs 24–20. **Drive: 1 play, 5 yards, 0:05.**

**Top passers**

- TB – Steve DeBerg – 29/54, 280 yards, 2 TD, 3 INT
- KC – Bill Kenney – 26/46, 332 yards, 2 TD, 2 INT

**Top rushers**

- TB – James Wilder – 25 rushes, 91 yards
- KC – Billy Jackson – 5 rushes, 31 yards

**Top receivers**

- TB – Kevin House – 10 receptions, 100 yards, TD
- KC – Carlos Carson – 7 receptions, 131 yards

==== Week 10: at Seattle Seahawks ====
Week 10: Kansas City Chiefs at Seattle Seahawks – Game summary

Quarter	1	2	3	4	Total
Chiefs	0	0	0	0	**0**
**Seahawks**	3	28	7	7	**45**

at Kingdome, Seattle, Washington

- Date: November 4
- Game time: 1:00 p.m. PST
- Game weather: None (indoor stadium)
- Game attendance: 61,396
- Referee: Jerry Markbreit
- TV announcers (NBC): Jay Randolph and John Brodie
- Recap, Game Book

Game information

**First quarter**

- SEA – Norm Johnson 29-yard field goal, 6:28. Seahawks 3–0. **Drive: 9 plays, 69 yards, 2:45.**

**Second quarter**

- SEA – Dave Brown 90-yard interception return (Norm Johnson kick), 13:29. Seahawks 10–0.
- SEA – Keith Simpson 76-yard interception return (Norm Johnson kick), 11:18. Seahawks 17–0.
- SEA – Dan Doornink 11-yard pass from Dave Krieg (Norm Johnson kick), 7:47. Seahawks 24–0. **Drive: 7 plays, 60 yards, 2:27.**
- SEA – Mike Tice 2-yard pass from Dave Krieg (Norm Johnson kick), 0:42. Seahawks 31–0. **Drive: 11 plays, 74 yards, 4:53.**

**Third quarter**

- SEA – Dave Brown 56-yard interception return (Norm Johnson kick), 12:40. Seahawks 38–0.

**Fourth quarter**

- SEA – Kenny Easley 58-yard interception return (Norm Johnson kick), 1:35. Seahawks 45–0.

**Top passers**

- KC – Bill Kenney – 8/18, 86 yards, 2 INT
- SEA – Dave Krieg – 12/20, 138 yards, 2 TD, INT

**Top rushers**

- KC – Herman Heard – 13 rushes, 53 yards
- SEA – Zachary Dixon – 9 rushes, 54 yards

**Top receivers**

- KC – J.T. Smith – 5 receptions, 49 yards
- SEA – Daryl Turner – 2 receptions, 37 yards

==== Week 11: vs. Houston Oilers ====
Week 11: Houston Oilers at Kansas City Chiefs – Game summary

Quarter	1	2	3	4	Total
**Oilers**	0	7	0	10	**17**
Chiefs	3	3	3	7	**16**

at Arrowhead Stadium, Kansas City, Missouri

- Date: November 11
- Game time: 12:00 p.m. CST
- Game weather: Partly Sunny, 40 °F (4 °C)
- Game attendance: 44,464
- Referee: Chuck Heberling
- TV announcers (NBC): Jay Randolph and Bob Trumpy
- Recap, Game Book

Game information

**First quarter**

- KC – Nick Lowery 31-yard field goal, 5:49. Chiefs 3–0. **Drive: 8 plays, 44 yards, 3:49.**

**Second quarter**

- HOU – Jamie Williams 2-yard pass from Warren Moon (Joe Cooper kick), 13:23. Oilers 7–3. **Drive: 11 plays, 75 yards, 4:50.**
- KC – Nick Lowery 38-yard field goal, 0:02. Oilers 7–6. **Drive: 5 plays, 60 yards, 0:44.**

**Third quarter**

- KC – Nick Lowery 33-yard field goal, 6:18. Chiefs 9–7. **Drive: 5 plays, 27 yards, 1:54.**

**Fourth quarter**

- HOU – Warren Moon 1-yard run (Joe Cooper kick), 12:29. Oilers 14–9. **Drive: 8 plays, 55 yards, 3:33.**
- HOU – Joe Cooper 44-yard field goal, 1:34. Oilers 17–9. **Drive: 9 plays, 40 yards, 3:19.**
- KC – Henry Marshall 4-yard pass from Todd Blackledge (Nick Lowery kick), 0:26. Oilers 17–16. **Drive: 5 plays, 74 yards, 1:08.**

**Top passers**

- HOU – Warren Moon – 19/26, 180 yards, TD
- KC – Todd Blackledge – 20/41, 236 yards, TD

**Top rushers**

- HOU – Larry Moriarty – 29 rushes, 117 yards
- KC – Herman Heard – 14 rushes, 73 yards

**Top receivers**

- HOU – Tim Smith – 8 receptions, 107 yards
- KC – Henry Marshall – 6 receptions, 79 yards, TD

==== Week 12: at Los Angeles Raiders ====
Week 12: Kansas City Chiefs at Los Angeles Raiders – Game summary

Quarter	1	2	3	4	Total
Chiefs	0	0	0	7	**7**
**Raiders**	7	7	0	3	**17**

at Los Angeles Memorial Coliseum, Los Angeles, California

- Date: November 18
- Game time: 1:00 p.m. PST
- Game weather: Overcast, 67 °F (19 °C)
- Game attendance: 48,575
- Referee: Gene Barth
- TV announcers (NBC): Phil Stone and Gene Washington
- Recap, Game Book

Game information

**First quarter**

- RAI – Rod Martin 77-yard fumble return (Chris Bahr kick), 4:44. Raiders 7–0.

**Second quarter**

- RAI – Dokie Williams 12-yard pass from Marc Wilson (Chris Bahr kick), 0:13. Raiders 14–0. **Drive: 6 plays, 48 yards, 1:38.**

**Third quarter**

- No scoring plays.

**Fourth quarter**

- RAI – Chris Bahr 22-yard field goal, 5:07. Raiders 17–0. **Drive: 21 plays, 75 yards, 12:31.**
- KC – Willie Scott 3-yard pass from Bill Kenney (Nick Lowery kick), 1:41. Raiders 17–7. **Drive: 4 plays, 43 yards, 0:30.**

**Top passers**

- KC – Bill Kenney – 19/37, 194 yards, TD, INT
- RAI – Marc Wilson – 12/21, 103 yards, TD, INT

**Top rushers**

- KC – Herman Heard – 7 rushes, 22 yards
- RAI – Marcus Allen – 16 rushes, 95 yards

**Top receivers**

- KC – Carlos Carson – 3 receptions, 58 yards
- RAI – Dokie Williams – 5 receptions, 54 yards, TD

==== Week 13: at New York Giants ====
Week 13: Kansas City Chiefs at New York Giants – Game summary

Quarter	1	2	3	4	Total
Chiefs	0	17	0	10	**27**
**Giants**	0	7	7	14	**28**

at Giants Stadium, East Rutherford, New Jersey

- Date: November 25
- Game time: 1:00 p.m. EST
- Game weather: Sunny, Clear, 50 °F (10 °C)
- Game attendance: 74,383
- Referee: Tom Dooley
- TV announcers (NBC): Don Criqui and Bob Trumpy
- Recap, Game Book

Game information

**First quarter**

- No scoring plays.

**Second quarter**

- KC – Stephone Paige 26-yard pass from Bill Kenney (Nick Lowery kick), 11:21. Chiefs 7–0. **Drive: 5 plays, 39 yards, 2:11.**
- NYG – Rob Carpenter 1-yard run (Ali Haji-Sheikh kick), 5:24. Tied 7–7. **Drive: 9 plays, 79 yards, 5:57.**
- KC – Nick Lowery 41-yard field goal, 0:47. Chiefs 10–7. **Drive: 7 plays, 17 yards, 2:41.**
- KC – Willie Scott 8-yard pass from Bill Kenney (Nick Lowery kick), 0:14. Chiefs 17–7. **Drive: 1 play, 8 yards, 0:05.**

**Third quarter**

- NYG – Rob Carpenter 1-yard run (Ali Haji-Sheikh kick), 8:30. Chiefs 17–14. **Drive: 13 plays, 80 yards, 6:30.**

**Fourth quarter**

- KC – Nick Lowery 52-yard field goal, 12:36. Chiefs 20–14. **Drive: 8 plays, 35 yards, 2:34.**
- KC – Carlos Carson 34-yard pass from Bill Kenney (Nick Lowery kick), 9:18. Chiefs 27–14. **Drive: 5 plays, 48 yards, 2:05.**
- NYG – Bobby Johnson 22-yard pass from Phil Simms (Ali Haji-Sheikh kick), 7:30. Chiefs 27–21. **Drive: 5 plays, 90 yards, 1:48.**
- NYG – Zeke Mowatt 3-yard pass from Phil Simms (Ali Haji-Sheikh kick), 2:22. Giants 28–27. **Drive: 7 plays, 80 yards, 2:41.**

**Top passers**

- KC – Bill Kenney – 18/36, 286 yards, 3 TD, INT
- NYG – Phil Simms – 24/41, 343 yards, 2 TD, 3 INT

**Top rushers**

- KC – Herman Heard – 10 rushes, 30 yards
- NYG – Rob Carpenter – 22 rushes, 86 yards, 2 TD

**Top receivers**

- KC – Carlos Carson – 5 receptions, 153 yards, TD
- NYG – Zeke Mowatt – 7 receptions, 126 yards, TD

==== Week 14: vs. Denver Broncos ====
Week 14: Denver Broncos at Kansas City Chiefs – Game summary

Quarter	1	2	3	4	Total
Broncos	7	3	3	0	**13**
**Chiefs**	0	7	0	9	**16**

at Arrowhead Stadium, Kansas City, Missouri

- Date: December 2
- Game time: 12:00 p.m. CST
- Game weather: Overcast, 28 °F (−2 °C)
- Game attendance: 38,494
- Referee: Fred Wyant
- TV announcers (NBC): Charlie Jones and Bob Griese
- Recap, Game Book

Game information

**First quarter**

- DEN – Steve Watson 48-yard pass from John Elway (Rich Karlis kick), 0:48. Broncos 7–0. **Drive: 2 plays, 48 yards, 0:14.**

**Second quarter**

- DEN – Rich Karlis 22-yard field goal, 5:00. Broncos 10–0. **Drive: 14 plays, 76 yards, 7:10.**
- KC – Carlos Carson 26-yard pass from Bill Kenney (Nick Lowery kick), 0:08. Broncos 10–7. **Drive: 9 plays, 86 yards, 1:45.**

**Third quarter**

- DEN – Rich Karlis 37-yard field goal, 13:48. Broncos 13–7. **Drive: 4 plays, 3 yards, 1:00.**

**Fourth quarter**

- KC – Nick Lowery 46-yard field goal, 11:41. Broncos 13–10. **Drive: 11 plays, 62 yards, 3:45.**
- KC – Nick Lowery 28-yard field goal, 7:01. Tied 13–13. **Drive: 8 plays, 66 yards, 2:36.**
- KC – Nick Lowery 42-yard field goal, 1:56. Chiefs 16–13. **Drive: 6 plays, 25 yards, 2:29.**

**Top passers**

- DEN – John Elway – 16/36, 183 yards, TD, INT
- KC – Bill Kenney – 20/38, 281 yards, TD, INT

**Top rushers**

- DEN – Sammy Winder – 25 rushes, 96 yards
- KC – Herman Heard – 22 rushes, 84 yards

**Top receivers**

- DEN – Steve Watson – 4 receptions, 89 yards, TD
- KC – Carlos Carson – 7 receptions, 126 yards, TD

==== Week 15: vs. Seattle Seahawks ====
Week 15: Seattle Seahawks at Kansas City Chiefs – Game summary

Quarter	1	2	3	4	Total
Seahawks	7	0	0	0	**7**
**Chiefs**	7	17	7	3	**34**

at Arrowhead Stadium, Kansas City, Missouri

- Date: December 9
- Game time: 12:00 p.m. CST
- Game weather: Overcast, 54 °F (12 °C)
- Game attendance: 34,855
- Referee: Pat Haggerty
- TV announcers (NBC): Charlie Jones and Bob Griese
- Recap, Game Book

Game information

**First quarter**

- KC – Herman Heard 2-yard run (Nick Lowery kick), 8:26. Chiefs 7–0. **Drive: 8 plays, 52 yards, 3:52.**
- SEA – Daryl Turner 49-yard pass from Dave Krieg (Norm Johnson kick), 0:54. Tied 7–7. **Drive: 4 plays, 68 yards, 2:15.**

**Second quarter**

- KC – Nick Lowery 29-yard field goal, 11:21. Chiefs 10–7. **Drive: 13 plays, 75 yards, 4:33.**
- KC – Scott Radecic 19-yard interception return (Nick Lowery kick), 10:24. Chiefs 17–7.
- KC – Henry Marshall 26-yard pass from Bill Kenney (Nick Lowery kick), 5:22. Chiefs 24–7. **Drive: 6 plays, 75 yards, 2:38.**

**Third quarter**

- KC – Carlos Carson 25-yard pass from Bill Kenney (Nick Lowery kick), 2:32. Chiefs 31–7. **Drive: 2 plays, 23 yards, 0:45.**

**Fourth quarter**

- KC – Nick Lowery 22-yard field goal, 12:17. Chiefs 34–7. **Drive: 4 plays, 9 yards, 2:32.**

**Top passers**

- SEA – Dave Krieg – 17/38, 263 yards, TD, 5 INT
- KC – Bill Kenney – 18/37, 212 yards, 2 TD

**Top rushers**

- SEA – David Hughes – 8 rushes, 32 yards
- KC – Herman Heard – 24 rushes, 73 yards, TD

**Top receivers**

- SEA – Steve Largent – 4 receptions, 98 yards
- KC – Henry Marshall – 8 receptions, 166 yards, TD

==== Week 16: at San Diego Chargers ====
Week 16: Kansas City Chiefs at San Diego Chargers – Game summary

Quarter	1	2	3	4	Total
**Chiefs**	14	14	14	0	**42**
Chargers	0	0	7	14	**21**

at Jack Murphy Stadium, San Diego, California

- Date: December 16
- Game time: 1:00 p.m. PST
- Game weather: Partly Cloudy, 64 °F (18 °C)
- Game attendance: 40,221
- Referee: Bob Frederic
- TV announcers (NBC): Phil Stone and Dave Rowe
- Recap, Game Book

Game information

**First quarter**

- KC – Billy Jackson 3-yard run (Nick Lowery kick), 10:53. Chiefs 7–0. **Drive: 7 plays, 83 yards, 2:24.**
- KC – Walt Arnold 4-yard pass from Bill Kenney (Nick Lowery kick), 4:20. Chiefs 14–0. **Drive: 6 plays, 73 yards, 2:19.**

**Second quarter**

- KC – Henry Marshall 8-yard pass from Bill Kenney (Nick Lowery kick), 13:19. Chiefs 21–0. **Drive: 9 plays, 62 yards, 4:54.**
- KC – Stephone Paige 65-yard pass from Bill Kenney (Nick Lowery kick), 1:10. Chiefs 28–0. **Drive: 3 plays, 65 yards, 0:34.**

**Third quarter**

- KC – Herman Heard 3-yard run (Nick Lowery kick), 12:12. Chiefs 35–0. **Drive: 5 plays, 47 yards, 2:45.**
- KC – Theotis Brown 2-yard run (Nick Lowery kick), 4:44. Chiefs 42–0. **Drive: 13 plays, 73 yards, 6:24.**
- SD – Wes Chandler 15-yard pass from Ed Luther (Rolf Benirschke kick), 0:31. Chiefs 42–7. **Drive: 10 plays, 67 yards, 4:03.**

**Fourth quarter**

- SD – Buford McGee 2-yard run (Rolf Benirschke kick), 6:01. Chiefs 42–14. **Drive: 13 plays, 82 yards, 7:33.**
- SD – Buford McGee 3-yard run (Rolf Benirschke kick), 0:55. Chiefs 42–21. **Drive: 7 plays, 91 yards, 0:55.**

**Top passers**

- KC – Bill Kenney – 17/23, 245 yards, 3 TD
- SD – Ed Luther – 24/44, 333 yards, TD

**Top rushers**

- KC – Herman Heard – 15 rushes, 84 yards, TD
- SD – Earnest Jackson – 19 rushes, 79 yards

**Top receivers**

- KC – Henry Marshall – 6 receptions, 84 yards, TD
- SD – Eric Sievers – 4 receptions, 83 yards

=== Standings ===
AFC West
	W	L	T	PCT	DIV	CONF	PF	PA	STK
^{(2)} Denver Broncos	13	3	0	.813	6–2	10–2	353	241	W2
^{(4)} Seattle Seahawks	12	4	0	.750	5–3	8–4	418	282	L2
^{(5)} Los Angeles Raiders	11	5	0	.688	5–3	8–4	368	278	L1
Kansas City Chiefs	8	8	0	.500	4–4	7–7	314	324	W3
San Diego Chargers	7	9	0	.438	0–8	3–9	394	413	L2
