= 1985 Kansas City Chiefs season =

NFL team season

- Owner: Lamar Hunt
- General manager: Jim Schaaf
- Head coach: John Mackovic
- Home stadium: Arrowhead Stadium

Results
- Record: 6–10
- Division place: 5th AFC West
- Playoffs: Did not qualify
- All-Pros: 2: S Deron Cherry (2nd team); K Nick Lowery (1st team)
- Pro Bowlers: 1: S Deron Cherry

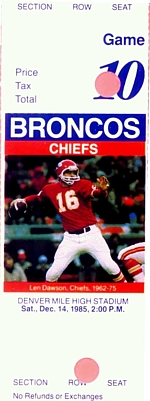
A ticket for a December 1985 game between the Chiefs and the Denver Broncos.

The 1985 Kansas City Chiefs season was the franchise's 16th season in the National Football League and the 26th overall.

The Chiefs got off to a great start in 1985 with a 47–27 win at New Orleans, while safety Deron Cherry tied an NFL record by registering four interceptions in a 28–7 win against Seattle on September 29 as the club boasted a 3–1 record four games into the season. The club was then confronted with a seven-game losing streak (amidst, nonetheless, the neighboring Kansas City Royals's World Series run) that wasn’t snapped until quarterback Todd Blackledge was installed as the starter against Indianapolis on November 24. The team rebounded to win three of its final five contests of the year with Blackledge under center, further inflaming a quarterback controversy that continued into the 1986 season.

Among these wins was the first time since 1972 that the Chiefs played the Atlanta Falcons, and merely the second in team history. The reason for this is that before the admission of the Texans in 2002, NFL scheduling formulas for games outside a team's division were much more influenced by table position during the previous season.

One of the few remaining bright spots in a disappointing 6–10 season came in the regular season finale against San Diego when wide receiver Stephone Paige set an NFL record with 309 receiving yards in a 38–34 win, breaking the previous mark of 303 yards set by Cleveland's Jim Benton in 1945. Paige's mark was subsequently surpassed by a 336-yard effort by Flipper Anderson (Los Angeles Rams) in 1989.

== Offseason ==
=== NFL draft ===
1985 Kansas City Chiefs draft
| Round | Selection | Player | Position | College |
|---|---|---|---|---|
| 1 | 15 | Ethan Horton | Tight end | North Carolina |
| 2 | 41 | Jonathan Hayes | Tight end | Iowa |
| 4 | 99 | Bob Olderman | Guard | Virginia |
| 5 | 126 | Bruce King | Fullback | Purdue |
| 6 | 149 | John Bostic | Defensive end | Bethune–Cookman |
| 7 | 180 | Vince Thomson | Defensive end | Missouri Western |
| 7 | 183 | Dave Heffernan | Guard | Miami (FL) |
| 8 | 210 | Ira Hillary | Wide receiver | South Carolina |
| 9 | 237 | Earl Johnson | Defensive back | Southwest Missouri State |
| 10 | 267 | Jeff Smith | Running back | Nebraska |
| 11 | 293 | Chris Jackson | Center | SMU |

== Personnel ==
=== Staff / Coaches ===
1985 Kansas City Chiefs staff
| Front office: Founder – Lamar Hunt; President – Jack Steadman; Vice-president and general manager – Jim Schaaf; Director of player personnel – Les Miller; Head coaches: Head coach – John Mackovic; Offensive coaches: Quarterbacks – Pete McCulley; Offensive backs – Willie Peete; Receivers – Richard Williamson; Offensive line – Marty Galbraith; Offensive assistant – JD Helm | Defensive coaches: Defensive coordinator/inside linebackers – Dan Daniel; Defensive line – Walt Corey; Outside linebackers – Jim Vechiarella; Defensive backs – Doug Graber; Defensive assistant – Dave Brazil; Special teams coaches: Special teams – Jim Vechiarella; Strength and conditioning: Strength and conditioning – CT Hewgley |

=== Roster ===
1985 Kansas City Chiefs roster
| Quarterbacks (QB): 14 Todd Blackledge; 9 Bill Kenney; Running backs (RB): 44 Herman Heard; 32 Ethan Horton; 46 Bruce King; 43 Mike Pruitt; Wide receivers (WR): 88 Carlos Carson; 82 Anthony Hancock; 89 Henry Marshall; 83 Stephone Paige; 80 George Shorthose; Tight ends (TE): 87 Walt Arnold; 85 Jonathan Hayes; 81 Willie Scott | Offensive linemen (OL): 68 Scott Auer G; 77 Rich Baldinger G/T; 65 Rob Fada G; 60 Matt Herkenhoff T; 62 Adam Lingner C; 72 Dave Lutz T; 64 Bob Olderman G; 53 Bob Rush C; 70 Billy Shields T; Defensive linemen (DL): 93 Eric Holle NT; 74 Pete Koch DE; 71 Dave Lindstrom DE; 63 Bill Maas NT; 92 Hal Stephens DE | Linebackers (LB): 57 Jerry Blanton ILB; 55 Louis Cooper OLB; 50 Calvin Daniels OLB; 52 Ken Jolly OLB; 95 Jeff Paine OLB; 97 Scott Radecic ILB; 59 Gary Spani ILB; Defensive backs (DB): 34 Lloyd Burruss SS; 20 Deron Cherry FS; 22 Sherman Cocroft FS; 23 Greg Hill CB; 41 Garcia Lane CB; 29 Albert Lewis CB; 30 Mark Robinson SS; 31 Kevin Ross CB; Special teams (ST): 6 Jim Arnold P; 8 Nick Lowery K | Reserve: 76 John Alt T (IR); 99 Mike Bell DE (LOA); 27 Theotis Brown RB (NF-Ill.); 66 Brad Budde G (IR); 90 Bob Hamm DE (IR); -- Billy Jackson RB (IR); 94 Ken McAlister LB (IR); 42 Jeff Smith RB (IR); 67 Art Still DE (IR); Rookies in italics |

== Preseason ==
| Week | Date | Opponent | Result | Record | Venue | Attendance | Recap |
|---|---|---|---|---|---|---|---|
| 1 | August 10 | at Cincinnati Bengals | W 35–27 | 1–0 | Riverfront Stadium | 41,115 | Recap |
| 2 | August 17 | New England Patriots | L 13–31 | 1–1 | Arrowhead Stadium | 35,162 | Recap |
| 3 | August 24 | at Houston Oilers | W 24–19 | 2–1 | Houston Astrodome | 36,501 | Recap |
| 4 | August 31 | St. Louis Cardinals | W 17–13 | 3–1 | Arrowhead Stadium | 38,618 | Recap |

== Regular season ==
=== Schedule ===
| Week | Date | Opponent | Result | Record | Venue | Attendance | Recap |
|---|---|---|---|---|---|---|---|
| 1 | September 8 | at New Orleans Saints | **W** 47–27 | 1–0 | Louisiana Superdome | 57,760 | Recap |
| 2 | September 12 | **Los Angeles Raiders** | **W** 36–20 | 2–0 | Arrowhead Stadium | 72,686 | Recap |
| 3 | September 22 | at Miami Dolphins | **L** 0–31 | 2–1 | Miami Orange Bowl | 69,791 | Recap |
| 4 | September 29 | **Seattle Seahawks** | **W** 28–7 | 3–1 | Arrowhead Stadium | 50,485 | Recap |
| 5 | October 6 | at **Los Angeles Raiders** | **L** 10–19 | 3–2 | Los Angeles Memorial Coliseum | 55,133 | Recap |
| 6 | October 13 | at **San Diego Chargers** | **L** 20–31 | 3–3 | Jack Murphy Stadium | 50,067 | Recap |
| 7 | October 20 | Los Angeles Rams | **L** 0–16 | 3–4 | Arrowhead Stadium | 64,474 | Recap |
| 8 | October 27 | **Denver Broncos** | **L** 10–30 | 3–5 | Arrowhead Stadium | 68,246 | Recap |
| 9 | November 3 | at Houston Oilers | **L** 20–23 | 3–6 | Houston Astrodome | 41,238 | Recap |
| 10 | November 10 | Pittsburgh Steelers | **L** 28–36 | 3–7 | Arrowhead Stadium | 46,126 | Recap |
| 11 | November 17 | at San Francisco 49ers | **L** 3–31 | 3–8 | Candlestick Park | 56,447 | Recap |
| 12 | November 24 | Indianapolis Colts | **W** 20–7 | 4–8 | Arrowhead Stadium | 21,762 | Recap |
| 13 | December 1 | at **Seattle Seahawks** | **L** 6–24 | 4–9 | Kingdome | 52,655 | Recap |
| 14 | December 8 | Atlanta Falcons | **W** 38–10 | 5–9 | Arrowhead Stadium | 18,199 | Recap |
| 15 | December 14 | at **Denver Broncos** | **L** 13–14 | 5–10 | Mile High Stadium | 69,209 | Recap |
| 16 | December 22 | **San Diego Chargers** | **W** 38–34 | 6–10 | Arrowhead Stadium | 18,178 | Recap |
Note: Intra-division opponents are in **bold** text.

=== Game summaries ===
==== Week 1: at New Orleans Saints ====
Week 1: Kansas City Chiefs at New Orleans Saints – Game summary

| Quarter | 1 | 2 | 3 | 4 | Total |
|---|---|---|---|---|---|
| **Chiefs** | 10 | 16 | 7 | 14 | **47** |
| Saints | 3 | 0 | 0 | 24 | **27** |

at Louisiana Superdome, New Orleans, Louisiana

- Date: September 8
- Game time: 12:00 p.m. CDT
- Game weather: None (indoor stadium)
- Game attendance: 57,760
- Referee: Bob Frederic
- TV announcers (NBC): Tom Hammond and Bob Kuechenberg
- Recap, Game Book

Game information

**First quarter**

- KC – Walt Arnold 31-yard run Bill Kenney (Nick Lowery kick), 13:54. Chiefs 7–0. **Drive: 3 plays, 84 yards, 1:06.**
- KC – Nick Lowery 48-yard field goal, 5:37. Chiefs 10–0. **Drive: 9 plays, 66 yards, 4:29.**
- NO – Morten Andersen 50-yard field goal, 0:03. Chiefs 10–3. **Drive: 8 plays, 33 yards, 4:49.**

**Second quarter**

- KC – Nick Lowery 52-yard field goal, 12:28. Chiefs 13–3. **Drive: 8 plays, 45 yards, 2:35.**
- KC – Carlos Carson 37-yard pass from Bill Kenney (Nick Lowery kick), 9:44. Chiefs 20–3. **Drive: 4 plays, 50 yards, 1:35.**
- KC – Nick Lowery 52-yard field goal, 6:56. Chiefs 23–3. **Drive: 4 plays, 8 yards, 1:25.**
- KC – Nick Lowery 34-yard field goal, 2:05. Chiefs 26–3. **Drive: 10 plays, 43 yards, 3:42.**

**Third quarter**

- KC – Herman Heard 3-yard run (Nick Lowery kick), 7:48. Chiefs 33–3. **Drive: 9 plays, 72 yards, 5:08.**

**Fourth quarter**

- NO – Hoby Brenner 5-yard pass from Richard Todd (Morten Andersen kick), 14:51. Chiefs 33–10. **Drive: 11 plays, 58 yards, 3:57.**
- NO – Wayne Wilson 6-yard pass from Richard Todd (Morten Andersen kick), 13:36. Chiefs 33–17. **Drive: 4 plays, 24 yards, 1:24.**
- NO – Morten Andersen 36-yard field goal, 10:58. Chiefs 33–20. **Drive: 7 plays, 6 yards, 2:03.**
- KC – Carlos Carson 19-yard pass from Bill Kenney (Nick Lowery kick), 8:13. Chiefs 40–20. **Drive: 8 plays, 78 yards, 2:35.**
- KC – Ethan Horton 19-yard run (Nick Lowery kick), 7:43. Chiefs 47–20. **Drive: 1 play, 19 yards, 0:07.**
- NO – Jeff Groth 56-yard pass from Richard Todd (Morten Andersen kick), 0:50. Chiefs 47–27. **Drive: 4 plays, 62 yards, 1:02.**

**Top passers**

- KC – Bill Kenney – 22/34, 397 yards, 3 TD, INT
- NO – Richard Todd – 12/26, 162 yards, 3 TD, 2 INT

**Top rushers**

- KC – Herman Heard – 17 rushes, 54 yards, TD
- NO – Hokie Gajan – 9 rushes, 57 yards

**Top receivers**

- KC – Carlos Carson – 8 receptions, 173 yards, 2 TD
- NO – Jeff Groth – 3 receptions, 80 yards, TD

==== Week 2: vs. Los Angeles Raiders ====
Week 2: Los Angeles Raiders at Kansas City Chiefs – Game summary

| Quarter | 1 | 2 | 3 | 4 | Total |
|---|---|---|---|---|---|
| Raiders | 7 | 7 | 0 | 6 | **20** |
| **Chiefs** | 3 | 9 | 17 | 7 | **36** |

at Arrowhead Stadium, Kansas City, Missouri

- Date: September 12
- Game time: 7:00 p.m. CDT
- Game weather: Overcast, 72 °F (22 °C)
- Game attendance: 72,686
- Referee: Fred Silva
- TV announcers (ABC): Frank Gifford, Joe Namath and O. J. Simpson
- Recap, Game Book

Game information

**First quarter**

- RAI – Frank Hawkins 1-yard run (Chris Bahr kick), 5:59. Raiders 7–0. **Drive: 7 plays, 63 yards, 3:50.**
- KC – Nick Lowery 39-yard field goal, 3:44. Raiders 7–3. **Drive: 8 plays, 57 yards, 2:05.**

**Second quarter**

- KC – Nick Lowery 22-yard field goal, 10:09. Raiders 7–6. **Drive: 13 plays, 75 yards, 4:15.**
- KC – Nick Lowery 42-yard field goal, 6:52. Chiefs 9–7. **Drive: 4 plays, 6 yards, 2:41.**
- RAI – Todd Christensen 3-yard pass from Jim Plunkett (Chris Bahr kick), 1:55. Raiders 14–9. **Drive: 4 plays, 30 yards, 1:44.**
- KC – Nick Lowery 58-yard field goal, 0:43. Raiders 14–12. **Drive: 7 plays, 27 yards, 1:06.**

**Third quarter**

- KC – Nick Lowery 21-yard field goal, 10:21. Chiefs 15–14. **Drive: 10 plays, 76 yards, 4:09.**
- KC – Carlos Carson 25-yard pass from Bill Kenney (Nick Lowery kick), 4:55. Chiefs 22–14. **Drive: 8 plays, 78 yards, 3:43.**
- KC – Stephone Paige 5-yard pass from Bill Kenney (Nick Lowery kick), 3:48. Chiefs 29–14. **Drive: 3 plays, 6 yards, 0:49.**

**Fourth quarter**

- KC – Albert Lewis fumble recovery in endzone (Nick Lowery kick), 9:48. Chiefs 36–14.
- RAI – Jessie Hester 2-yard pass from Jim Plunkett (kick failed, wide left), 6:52. Chiefs 36–20. **Drive: 14 plays, 83 yards, 2:45.**

**Top passers**

- RAI – Jim Plunkett – 34/48, 303 yards, 2 TD, 2 INT
- KC – Bill Kenney – 18/38, 259 yards, 2 TD

**Top rushers**

- RAI – Marcus Allen – 14 rushes, 50 yards
- KC – Herman Heard – 21 rushes, 66 yards

**Top receivers**

- RAI – Todd Christensen – 11 receptions, 116 yards, TD
- KC – Carlos Carson – 5 receptions, 118 yards, TD

==== Week 3: at Miami Dolphins ====
Week 3: Kansas City Chiefs at Miami Dolphins – Game summary

| Quarter | 1 | 2 | 3 | 4 | Total |
|---|---|---|---|---|---|
| Chiefs | 0 | 0 | 0 | 0 | **0** |
| **Dolphins** | 0 | 0 | 14 | 17 | **31** |

at Miami Orange Bowl, Miami, Florida

- Date: September 22
- Game time: 4:00 p.m. EDT
- Game weather: Sunny, 89 °F (32 °C)
- Game attendance: 69,791
- Referee: Tom Dooley
- TV announcers (NBC): Jay Randolph and Reggie Rucker
- Recap, Game Book

Game information

**First quarter**

- No scoring plays.

**Second quarter**

- No scoring plays.

**Third quarter**

- MIA – Bruce Hardy 9-yard pass from Dan Marino (Fuad Reveiz kick), 11:54. Dolphins 7–0. **Drive: 5 plays, 53 yards, 3:06.**
- MIA – Woody Bennett 27-yard pass from Dan Marino (Fuad Reveiz kick), 3:16. Dolphins 14–0. **Drive: 11 plays, 80 yards, 5:41.**

**Fourth quarter**

- MIA – Ron Davenport 1-yard run (Fuad Reveiz kick), 13:40. Dolphins 21–0. **Drive: 3 plays, 34 yards, 0:19.**
- MIA – Ron Davenport 3-yard run (Fuad Reveiz kick), 10:07. Dolphins 28–0. **Drive: 4 plays, 41 yards, 1:49.**
- MIA – Fuad Reveiz 37-yard field goal, 6:04. Dolphins 31–0. **Drive: 4 plays, 7 yards, 2:03.**

**Top passers**

- KC – Bill Kenney – 19/38, 205 yards, 2 INT
- MIA – Dan Marino – 23/35, 258 yards, 2 TD, INT

**Top rushers**

- KC – Herman Heard – 12 rushes, 53 yards
- MIA – Ron Davenport – 12 rushes, 55 yards, TD

**Top receivers**

- KC – Henry Marshall – 4 receptions, 67 yards
- MIA – Woody Bennett – 4 receptions, 63 yards, TD

==== Week 4: vs. Seattle Seahawks ====
Week 4: Seattle Seahawks at Kansas City Chiefs – Game summary

| Quarter | 1 | 2 | 3 | 4 | Total |
|---|---|---|---|---|---|
| Seahawks | 0 | 0 | 7 | 0 | **7** |
| **Chiefs** | 14 | 7 | 7 | 0 | **28** |

at Arrowhead Stadium, Kansas City, Missouri

- Date: September 29
- Game time: 12:00 p.m. CDT
- Game weather: Overcast, 47 °F (8 °C)
- Game attendance: 50,485
- Referee: Ben Dreith
- TV announcers (NBC): Charlie Jones, Sam Rutigliano and Paul Zimmerman
- Recap, Game Book

Game information

**First quarter**

- KC – Herman Heard 2-yard run (Nick Lowery kick), 12:28. Chiefs 7–0. **Drive: 2 plays, 5 yards, 0:42.**
- KC – Stephone Paige 34-yard pass from Bill Kenney (Nick Lowery kick), 5:28. Chiefs 14–0. **Drive: 5 plays, 87 yards, 3:44.**

**Second quarter**

- KC – Bill Kenney 1-yard run (Nick Lowery kick), 0:26. Chiefs 21–0. **Drive: 4 plays, 13 yards, 1:03.**

**Third quarter**

- KC – Stephone Paige 8-yard pass from Bill Kenney (Nick Lowery kick), 8:14. Chiefs 28–0. **Drive: 2 plays, 14 yards, 0:49.**
- SEA – Daryl Turner 35-yard pass from Dave Krieg (Norm Johnson kick), 2:20. Chiefs 28–7. **Drive: 1 play, 35 yards, 0:09.**

**Fourth quarter**

- No scoring plays.

**Top passers**

- SEA – Dave Krieg – 19/38, 220 yards, TD, 4 INT
- KC – Bill Kenney – 8/19, 116 yards, 2 TD, INT

**Top rushers**

- SEA – Curt Warner – 26 rushes, 68 yards, TD
- KC – Herman Heard – 7 rushes, 26 yards

**Top receivers**

- SEA – Steve Largent – 6 receptions, 92 yards
- KC – Stephone Paige – 3 receptions, 66 yards, 2 TD

==== Week 5: at Los Angeles Raiders ====
Week 5: Kansas City Chiefs at Los Angeles Raiders – Game summary

| Quarter | 1 | 2 | 3 | 4 | Total |
|---|---|---|---|---|---|
| Chiefs | 3 | 0 | 0 | 7 | **10** |
| **Raiders** | 0 | 10 | 3 | 6 | **19** |

at Los Angeles Memorial Coliseum, Los Angeles, California

- Date: October 6
- Game time: 1:00 p.m. PDT
- Game weather: High Clouds, 82 °F (28 °C)
- Game attendance: 55,133
- Referee: Gene Barth
- TV announcers (NBC): Dick Enberg and Merlin Olsen
- Recap, Game Book

Game information

**First quarter**

- KC – Nick Lowery 36-yard field goal, 9:26. Chiefs 3–0. **Drive: 6 plays, 62 yards, 1:16.**

**Second quarter**

- RAI – Jim Smith 6-yard pass from Marc Wilson (Chris Bahr kick), 10:26. Raiders 7–3. **Drive: 5 plays, 45 yards, 2:37.**
- RAI – Chris Bahr 37-yard field goal, 0:13. Raiders 10–3. **Drive: 8 plays, 23 yards, 1:24.**

**Third quarter**

- RAI – Chris Bahr 25-yard field goal, 8:44. Raiders 13–3. **Drive: 9 plays, 64 yards, 3:46.**

**Fourth quarter**

- KC – Anthony Hancock 41-yard pass from Bill Kenney (Nick Lowery kick), 11:15. Raiders 13–10. **Drive: 5 plays, 69 yards, 1:33.**
- RAI – Chris Bahr 41-yard field goal, 6:04. Raiders 16–10. **Drive: 11 plays, 49 yards, 5:11.**
- RAI – Chris Bahr 41-yard field goal, 0:15. Raiders 19–10. **Drive: 4 plays, 7 yards, 1:06.**

**Top passers**

- KC – Bill Kenney – 14/28, 231 yards, TD, INT
- RAI – Marc Wilson – 18/29, 241 yards, TD

**Top rushers**

- KC – Herman Heard – 8 rush, 23 yards
- RAI – Marcus Allen – 29 rushes, 126 yards, TD

**Top receivers**

- KC – Henry Marshall – 4 receptions, 90 yards
- RAI – Dokie Williams – 5 receptions, 91 yards

==== Week 6 : at San Diego Chargers ====
Week 6: Kansas City Chiefs at San Diego Chargers – Game summary

| Quarter | 1 | 2 | 3 | 4 | Total |
|---|---|---|---|---|---|
| Chiefs | 3 | 14 | 3 | 0 | **20** |
| **Chargers** | 0 | 17 | 0 | 14 | **31** |

at Jack Murphy Stadium, San Diego, California

- Date: October 13
- Game time: 1:00 p.m. PDT
- Game weather: Clear and Sunny, 74 °F (23 °C)
- Game attendance: 50,067
- Referee: Pat Haggerty
- TV announcers (NBC): Phil Stone and Dave Rowe
- Recap, Game Book

Game information

**First quarter**

- KC – Nick Lowery 41-yard field goal, 9:32. Chiefs 3–0. **Drive: 10 plays, 57 yards, 10:19.**

**Second quarter**

- KC – Ethan Horton 2-yard pass from Bill Kenney (Nick Lowery kick), 9:44. Chiefs 10–0. **Drive: 7 plays, 59 yards, 4:03.**
- SD – Charlie Joiner 39-yard pass from Mark Herrmann (Bob Thomas kick), 6:46. Chiefs 10–7. **Drive: 5 plays, 62 yards, 2:58.**
- KC – Carlos Carson 18-yard pass from Bill Kenney (Nick Lowery kick), 4:50. Chiefs 17–7. **Drive: 5 plays, 60 yards, 1:56.**
- SD – Gary Anderson 6-yard run (Bob Thomas kick), 1:01. Chiefs 17–14. **Drive: 9 plays, 89 yards, 3:49.**
- SD – Bob Thomas 30-yard field goal, 0:09. Tied 17–17. **Drive: 5 plays, 17 yards, 0:40.**

**Third quarter**

- KC – Nick Lowery 34-yard field goal, 1:14. Chiefs 20–17. **Drive: 4 plays, 7 yards, 1:30.**

**Fourth quarter**

- SD – Eric Sievers 10-yard pass from Mark Herrmann (Bob Thomas kick), 11:01. Chargers 24–20. **Drive: 9 plays, 80 yards, 5:02.**
- SD – Tim Spencer 1-yard run (Bob Thomas kick), 6:17. Chargers 31–20. **Drive: 9 plays, 53 yards, 3:44.**

**Top passers**

- KC – Bill Kenney – 24/36, 304 yards, 2 TD, 2 INT
- SD – Mark Herrmann – 26/36, 320 yards, 2 TD

**Top rushers**

- KC – Stephone Paige – 1 rush, 15 yards
- SD – Tim Spencer – 8 rushes, 26 yards, TD

**Top receivers**

- KC – Carlos Carson – 4 receptions, 82 yards, TD
- SD – Charlie Joiner – 6 receptions, 118 yards, TD

==== Week 7: vs. Los Angeles Rams ====
Week 7: Los Angeles Rams at Kansas City Chiefs – Game summary

| Quarter | 1 | 2 | 3 | 4 | Total |
|---|---|---|---|---|---|
| **Rams** | 0 | 13 | 3 | 0 | **16** |
| Chiefs | 0 | 0 | 0 | 0 | **0** |

at Arrowhead Stadium, Kansas City, Missouri

- Date: October 20
- Game time: 12:00 p.m. CDT
- Game weather: Overcast, 57 °F (14 °C)
- Game attendance: 64,474
- Referee: Dick Jorgensen
- TV announcers (CBS): Jim Hill and John Dockery
- Recap

Game information

**First quarter**

- No scoring plays.

**Second quarter**

- LA – Eric Dickerson 1-yard run (Mike Lansford kick), 10:53. Rams 7–0.
- LA – Mike Lansford 33-yard field goal, 2:25. Rams 10–0.
- LA – Mike Lansford 37-yard field goal, 0:02. Rams 13–0.

**Third quarter**

- LA – Mike Lansford 30-yard field goal, 9:16. Rams 16–0.

**Fourth quarter**

- No scoring plays.

**Top passers**

- LA – Dieter Brock – 9/20, 68 yards
- KC – Todd Blackledge – 14/32, 161 yards, 6 INT

**Top rushers**

- LA – Eric Dickerson – 26 rushes, 68 yards, TD
- KC – Herman Heard – 10 rushes, 38 yards

**Top receivers**

- LA – Eric Dickerson – 6 receptions, 41 yards
- KC – Carlos Carson – 2 receptions, 35 yards

==== Week 8: vs. Denver Broncos ====
Week 8: Denver Broncos at Kansas City Chiefs – Game summary

| Quarter | 1 | 2 | 3 | 4 | Total |
|---|---|---|---|---|---|
| **Broncos** | 10 | 17 | 0 | 3 | **30** |
| Chiefs | 0 | 7 | 3 | 0 | **10** |

at Arrowhead Stadium, Kansas City, Missouri

- Date: October 27
- Game time: 12:00 p.m. CST
- Game weather: Sunny, 70 °F (21 °C)
- Game attendance: 68,246
- Referee: Jerry Markbreit
- TV announcers (NBC): Marv Albert and Bob Griese
- Recap, Game Book

Game information

**First quarter**

- DEN – Gerald Willhite 1-yard run (Rich Karlis kick), 8:26. Broncos 7–0. **Drive: 10 plays, 52 yards, 5:22.**
- DEN – Rich Karlis 24-yard field goal, 4:32. Broncos 10–0. **Drive: 4 plays, 2 yards, 1:51.**

**Second quarter**

- DEN – Gene Lang 1-yard run (Rich Karlis kick), 14:53. Broncos 17–0. **Drive: 9 plays, 58 yards, 4:08.**
- DEN – Gerald Willhite 3-yard run (Rich Karlis kick), 9:35. Broncos 24–0. **Drive: 6 plays, 24 yards, 3:04.**
- KC – Ethan Horton 1-yard run (Nick Lowery kick), 4:18. Broncos 24–7. **Drive: 11 plays, 75 yards, 5:08.**
- DEN – Rich Karlis 23-yard field goal, 0:00. Broncos 27–7. **Drive: 14 plays, 81 yards, 4:09.**

**Third quarter**

- KC – Nick Lowery 33-yard field goal, 7:58. Broncos 27–10. **Drive: 10 plays, 74 yards, 4:40.**

**Fourth quarter**

- DEN – Rich Karlis 19-yard field goal, 11:26. Broncos 30–10. **Drive: 13 plays, 84 yards, 7:14.**

**Top passers**

- DEN – John Elway – 13/20, 116 yards
- KC – Bill Kenney – 14/28, 195 yards

**Top rushers**

- DEN – Gene Lang – 12 rushes, 71 yards, TD
- KC – Herman Heard – 12 rushes, 47 yards

**Top receivers**

- DEN – Gene Lang – 5 receptions, 33 yards
- KC – Stephone Paige – 2 receptions, 60 yards

==== Week 9: at Houston Oilers ====
Week 9: Kansas City Chiefs at Houston Oilers – Game summary

| Quarter | 1 | 2 | 3 | 4 | Total |
|---|---|---|---|---|---|
| Chiefs | 0 | 3 | 3 | 14 | **20** |
| **Oilers** | 0 | 6 | 14 | 3 | **23** |

at Houston Astrodome, Houston, Texas

- Date: November 3
- Game time: 12:00 p.m. CST
- Game weather: None (indoor stadium)
- Game attendance: 41,238
- Referee: Jim Tunney
- TV announcers (NBC): Gary Gerould and Sam Rutigliano
- Recap, Game Book

Game information

**First quarter**

- No scoring plays.

**Second quarter**

- HOU – Drew Hill 23-yard pass from Warren Moon (kick failed, wide left), 3:07. Oilers 6–0. **Drive: 7 plays, 56 yards, 2:56.**
- KC – Nick Lowery 35-yard field goal, 0:29. Oilers 6–3. **Drive: 6 plays, 48 yards, 2:38.**

**Third quarter**

- HOU – Chris Dressel 3-yard pass from Warren Moon (Tony Zendejas kick), 9:59. Oilers 13–3. **Drive: 10 plays, 63 yards, 5:01.**
- KC – Nick Lowery 39-yard field goal, 6:10. Oilers 13–6. **Drive: 8 plays, 56 yards, 3:49.**
- HOU – Butch Woolfolk 3-yard run (Tony Zendejas kick), 1:45. Oilers 20–6. **Drive: 9 plays, 68 yards, 4:25.**

**Fourth quarter**

- KC – Herman Heard 6-yard pass from Bill Kenney (Nick Lowery kick), 13:40. Oilers 20–13. **Drive: 7 plays, 80 yards, 3:05.**
- KC – Stephone Paige 18-yard field goal Bill Kenney (Nick Lowery kick), 4:34. Tied 20–20. **Drive: 12 plays, 90 yards, 6:24.**
- HOU – Tony Zendejas 38-yard field goal, 0:14. Oilers 23–20. **Drive: 11 plays, 57 yards, 2:06.**

**Top passers**

- KC – Bill Kenney – 18/33, 271 yards, 2 TD, INT
- HOU – Warren Moon – 24/35, 255 yards, 2 TD, INT

**Top rushers**

- KC – Mike Pruitt – 18 rushes, 82 yards
- HOU – Butch Woolfolk – 14 rushes, 101 yards, TD

**Top receivers**

- KC – Carlos Carson – 6 receptions, 87 yards
- HOU – Drew Hill – 7 receptions, 88 yards, TD

==== Week 10: vs. Pittsburgh Steelers ====
Week 10: Pittsburgh Steelers at Kansas City Chiefs – Game summary

| Quarter | 1 | 2 | 3 | 4 | Total |
|---|---|---|---|---|---|
| **Steelers** | 10 | 17 | 3 | 6 | **36** |
| Chiefs | 7 | 7 | 0 | 14 | **28** |

at Arrowhead Stadium, Kansas City, Missouri

- Date: November 10
- Game time: 12:00 p.m. CST
- Game weather: Cloudy, 39 °F (4 °C)
- Game attendance: 46,126
- Referee: Ben Dreith
- TV announcers (NBC): Marv Albert and Bob Griese
- Recap, Game Book

Game information

**First quarter**

- KC – Deron Cherry 47-yard interception return (Nick Lowery kick), 11:43. Chiefs 7–0.
- PIT – John Stallworth 13-yard pass from David Woodley (Gary Anderson kick), 5:39. Tied 7–7. **Drive: 9 plays, 70 yards, 5:55.**
- PIT – Gary Anderson 35-yard field goal, 1:13. Steelers 10–7. **Drive: 8 plays, 35 yards, 2:16.**

**Second quarter**

- PIT – Gary Anderson 31-yard field goal, 11:35. Steelers 13–7. **Drive: 4 plays, 0 yards, 1:45.**
- KC – Jeff Smith 45-yard pass from Bill Kenney (Nick Lowery kick), 9:27. Chiefs 14–13. **Drive: 4 plays, 64 yards, 1:58.**
- PIT – Louis Lipps 71-yard punt return (Gary Anderson kick), 5:54. Steelers 20–14.
- PIT – Walter Abercrombie 2-yard run (Gary Anderson kick), 0:55. Steelers 27–14. **Drive: 7 plays, 79 yards, 3:00.**

**Third quarter**

- PIT – Gary Anderson 27-yard field goal, 6:20. Steelers 30–14. **Drive: 11 plays, 45 yards, 5:12.**

**Fourth quarter**

- KC – Jeff Smith 13-yard pass from Bill Kenney (Nick Lowery kick), 13:32. Steelers 30–21. **Drive: 7 plays, 56 yards, 1:51.**
- PIT – Gary Anderson 36-yard field goal, 9:07. Steelers 33–21. **Drive: 9 plays, 43 yards, 4:15.**
- PIT – Gary Anderson 28-yard field goal, 2:08. Steelers 36–21. **Drive: 9 plays, 64 yards, 5:45.**
- KC – Anthony Hancock 13-yard pass from Bill Kenney (Nick Lowery kick), 0:15. Steelers 36–28. **Drive: 8 plays, 73 yards, 1:44.**

**Top passers**

- PIT – David Woodley – 13/25, 258 yards, TD, INT
- KC – Bill Kenney – 22/39, 259 yards, 3 TD, INT

**Top rushers**

- PIT – Walter Abercrombie – 20 rushes, 67 yards, TD
- KC – Herman Heard – 4 rushes, 17 yards

**Top receivers**

- PIT – John Stallworth – 7 receptions, 126 yards, TD
- KC – Jeff Smith – 5 receptions, 82 yards, 2 TD

==== Week 11: at San Francisco 49ers ====
Week 11: Kansas City Chiefs at San Francisco 49ers – Game summary

| Quarter | 1 | 2 | 3 | 4 | Total |
|---|---|---|---|---|---|
| Chiefs | 3 | 0 | 0 | 0 | **3** |
| **49ers** | 3 | 14 | 7 | 7 | **31** |

at Candlestick Park, San Francisco, California

- Date: November 17
- Game time: 1:00 p.m. PST
- Game weather: Clear skies, 56 °F (13 °C)
- Game attendance: 56,447
- Referee: Jerry Seeman
- TV announcers (NBC): Gary Gerould and Dave Rowe
- Recap, Game Book

Game information

**First quarter**

- SF – Ray Wersching 41-yard field goal, 8:12. 49ers 3–0. **Drive: 8 plays, 29 yards, 4:20.**
- KC – Nick Lowery 46-yard field goal, 5:15. Tied 3–3. **Drive: 4 plays, 1 yard, 1:56.**

**Second quarter**

- SF – Roger Craig 1-yard run (Ray Wersching kick), 13:43. 49ers 10–3. **Drive: 7 plays, 29 yards, 2:33.**
- SF – Joe Montana 1-yard run (Ray Wersching kick), 9:29. 49ers 17–3. **Drive: 7 plays, 80 yards, 2:07.**

**Third quarter**

- SF – Dwight Clark 22-yard pass from Joe Montana (Ray Wersching kick), 9:45. 49ers 24–3. **Drive: 9 plays, 72 yards, 5:15.**

**Fourth quarter**

- SF – Russ Francis 8-yard pass from Joe Montana (Ray Wersching kick), 10:31. 49ers 31–3. **Drive: 6 plays, 64 yards, 2:44.**

**Top passers**

- KC – Todd Blackledge – 10/20, 77 yards
- SF – Joe Montana – 23/34, 235 yards, 2 TD

**Top rushers**

- KC – Mike Pruitt – 10 rushes, 33 yards
- SF – Wendell Tyler – 16 rushes, 111 yards

**Top receivers**

- KC – Carlos Carson – 3 receptions, 40 yards
- SF – Dwight Clark – 3 receptions, 77 yards, TD

==== Week 12: vs. Indianapolis Colts ====
Week 12: Indianapolis Colts at Kansas City Chiefs – Game summary

| Quarter | 1 | 2 | 3 | 4 | Total |
|---|---|---|---|---|---|
| Colts | 0 | 0 | 0 | 7 | **7** |
| **Chiefs** | 7 | 10 | 3 | 0 | **20** |

at Arrowhead Stadium, Kansas City, Missouri

- Date: November 24
- Game time: 3:00 p.m. CST
- Game weather: Cloudy, 25 °F (−4 °C)
- Game attendance: 21,762
- Referee: Chuck Heberling
- TV announcers (NBC): Fred Roggin and Dave Rowe
- Recap, Game Book

Game information

**First quarter**

- KC – Stephone Paige 22-yard pass from Todd Blackledge (Nick Lowery kick), 6:25. Chiefs 7–0. **Drive: 14 plays, 77 yards, 8:35.**

**Second quarter**

- KC – Mike Pruitt 2-yard run (Nick Lowery kick), 1:15. Chiefs 14–0. **Drive: 13 plays, 80 yards, 7:20.**
- KC – Nick Lowery 29-yard field goal, 0:03. Chiefs 17–0. **Drive: 6 plays, 60 yards, 0:34.**

**Third quarter**

- KC – Nick Lowery 42-yard field goal, 10:58. Chiefs 20–0. **Drive: 4 plays, 7 yards, 1:40.**

**Fourth quarter**

- IND – George Wonsley 14-yard run (Raúl Allegre kick), 2:22. Chiefs 20–7. **Drive: 4 plays, 80 yards, 1:44.**

**Top passers**

- IND – Mike Pagel – 8/13, 104 yards, INT
- KC – Todd Blackledge – 16/31, 246 yards, TD, INT

**Top rushers**

- IND – George Wonsley – 10 rushes, 73 yards, TD
- KC – Jeff Smith – 17 rushes, 55 yards

**Top receivers**

- IND – Pat Beach – 3 receptions, 50 yards
- KC – Anthony Hancock – 3 receptions, 79 yards

==== Week 13: at Seattle Seahawks ====
Week 13: Kansas City Chiefs at Seattle Seahawks – Game summary

| Quarter | 1 | 2 | 3 | 4 | Total |
|---|---|---|---|---|---|
| Chiefs | 3 | 0 | 3 | 0 | **6** |
| **Seahawks** | 3 | 14 | 7 | 0 | **24** |

at Kingdome, Seattle, Washington

- Date: December 1
- Game time: 1:00 p.m. PST
- Game weather: None (indoor stadium)
- Game attendance: 52,655
- Referee: Pat Haggerty
- TV announcers (NBC): Tom Hammond and Reggie Rucker
- Recap, Game Book

Game information

**First quarter**

- SEA – Norm Johnson 23-yard field goal, 7:45. Seahawks 3–0. **Drive: 13 plays, 77 yards, 7:06.**
- KC – Nick Lowery 25-yard field goal, 1:20. Tied 3–3. **Drive: 13 plays, 76 yards, 6:26.**

**Second quarter**

- SEA – Dan Ross 11-yard pass from Dave Krieg (Norm Johnson kick), 5:56. Seahawks 10–3. **Drive: 11 plays, 76 yards, 5:03.**
- SEA – Curt Warner 5-yard run (Norm Johnson kick), 3:52. Seahawks 17–3. **Drive: 3 plays, 15 yards, 0:45.**

**Third quarter**

- KC – Nick Lowery 35-yard field goal, 6:49. Seahawks 17–6. **Drive: 12 plays, 39 yards, 8:00.**
- SEA – Steve Largent 17-yard pass from Dave Krieg (Norm Johnson kick), 2:15. Seahawks 24–6. **Drive: 11 plays, 81 yards, 4:27.**

**Fourth quarter**

- No scoring plays.

**Top passers**

- KC – Todd Blackledge – 16/30, 180 yards, 3 INT
- SEA – Dave Krieg – 21/34, 254 yards, 2 TD, INT

**Top rushers**

- KC – Todd Blackledge – 2 rushes, 17 yards
- SEA – Curt Warner – 19 rushes, 66 yards, TD

**Top receivers**

- KC – Carlos Carson – 3 receptions, 61 yards
- SEA – Steve Largent – 7 receptions, 101 yards, TD

==== Week 14: vs. Atlanta Falcons ====
Week 14: Atlanta Falcons at Kansas City Chiefs – Game summary

| Quarter | 1 | 2 | 3 | 4 | Total |
|---|---|---|---|---|---|
| Falcons | 0 | 10 | 0 | 0 | **10** |
| **Chiefs** | 14 | 10 | 14 | 0 | **38** |

at Arrowhead Stadium, Kansas City, Missouri

- Date: December 8
- Game time: 12:00 p.m. CST
- Game weather: Partly Sunny, 39 °F (4 °C)
- Game attendance: 18,199
- Referee: Gordon McCarter
- TV announcers (CBS): Jack Buck and Hank Stram
- Recap, Game Book

Game information

**First quarter**

- KC – Ethan Horton 1-yard run (Nick Lowery kick), 7:55. Chiefs 7–0. **Drive: 12 plays, 87 yards, 7:05.**
- KC – Herman Heard 6-yard run (Nick Lowery kick), 4:17. Chiefs 14–0. **Drive: 4 plays, 76 yards, 1:33.**

**Second quarter**

- ATL – Gerald Riggs 1-yard run (Mick Luckhurst kick), 12:20. Chiefs 14–7. **Drive: 13 plays, 72 yards, 6:47.**
- KC – Stephone Paige 70-yard pass from Todd Blackledge (Nick Lowery kick), 10:52. Chiefs 21–7. **Drive: 3 plays, 72 yards, 1:21.**
- KC – Nick Lowery 49-yard field goal, 3:00. Chiefs 24–7. **Drive: 10 plays, 47 yards, 5:04.**
- ATL – Mick Luckhurst 37-yard field goal, 0:00. Chiefs 24–10. **Drive: 5 plays, 32 yards, 0:30.**

**Third quarter**

- KC – Herman Heard 15-yard pass from Todd Blackledge (Nick Lowery kick), 13:05. Chiefs 31–10. **Drive: 2 plays, 48 yards, 0:14.**
- KC – Stephone Paige 14-yard pass from Todd Blackledge (Nick Lowery kick), 5:01. Chiefs 38–10. **Drive: 5 plays, 61 yards, 3:14.**

**Fourth quarter**

- No scoring plays.

**Top passers**

- ATL – David Archer – 16/28, 146 yards, 3 INT
- KC – Todd Blackledge – 11/19, 219 yards, 3 TD, INT

**Top rushers**

- ATL – Gerald Riggs – 26 rushes, 197 yards, TD
- KC – Mike Pruitt – 16 rushes, 102 yards

**Top receivers**

- ATL – Billy Johnson – 7 receptions, 60 yards
- KC – Stephone Paige – 4 receptions, 94 yards, 2 TD

==== Week 15: at Denver Broncos ====
Week 15: Kansas City Chiefs at Denver Broncos – Game summary

| Quarter | 1 | 2 | 3 | 4 | Total |
|---|---|---|---|---|---|
| Chiefs | 3 | 0 | 3 | 7 | **13** |
| **Broncos** | 0 | 7 | 0 | 7 | **14** |

at Mile High Stadium, Denver, Colorado

- Date: December 14
- Game time: 2:00 p.m. MST
- Game weather: Sunny, 51 °F (11 °C)
- Game attendance: 69,209
- Referee: Red Cashion
- TV announcers (NBC): Don Criqui and Bob Trumpy
- Recap, Game Book

Game information

**First quarter**

- KC – Nick Lowery 32-yard field goal, 7:21. Chiefs 3–0. **Drive: 8 plays, 45 yards, 4:11.**

**Second quarter**

- DEN – Vance Johnson 11-yard pass from John Elway (Rich Karlis kick), 1:14. Broncos 7–3. **Drive: 13 plays, 85 yards, 7:54.**

**Third quarter**

- KC – Nick Lowery 41-yard field goal, 11:44. Broncos 7–6. **Drive: 5 plays, 30 yards, 2:07.**

**Fourth quarter**

- KC – Stephone Paige 7-yard pass from Todd Blackledge (Nick Lowery kick), 6:59. Chiefs 13–7. **Drive: 8 plays, 59 yards, 2:11.**
- DEN – Sammy Winder 1-yard run (Rich Karlis kick), 0:22. Broncos 14–13. **Drive: 8 plays, 59 yards, 1:31.**

**Top passers**

- KC – Todd Blackledge – 14/26, 158 yards, TD, INT
- DEN – John Elway – 22/37, 301 yards, TD, 5 INT

**Top rushers**

- KC – Herman Heard – 14 rushes, 56 yards
- DEN – Steve Sewell – 14 rushes, 59 yards

**Top receivers**

- KC – Carlos Carson – 6 receptions, 92 yards
- DEN – Vance Johnson – 6 receptions, 116 yards, TD

==== Week 16 : vs. San Diego Chargers ====
Week 16: San Diego Chargers at Kansas City Chiefs – Game summary

| Quarter | 1 | 2 | 3 | 4 | Total |
|---|---|---|---|---|---|
| Chargers | 3 | 3 | 7 | 21 | **34** |
| **Chiefs** | 7 | 28 | 3 | 0 | **38** |

at Arrowhead Stadium, Kansas City, Missouri

- Date: December 22
- Game time: 12:00 p.m. CST
- Game weather: Sunny, 45 °F (7 °C)
- Game attendance: 18,178
- Referee: Tom Dooley
- TV announcers (NBC): Charlie Jones and Jimmy Cefalo
- Recap, Game Book

Game information

**First quarter**

- KC – Stephone Paige 56-yard pass from Todd Blackledge (Nick Lowery kick), 10:08. Chiefs 7–0. **Drive: 1 play, 56 yards, 0:09.**
- SD – Bob Thomas 24-yard field goal, 4:19. Chiefs 7–3. **Drive: 12 plays, 54 yards, 5:39.**

**Second quarter**

- KC – Herman Heard 7-yard run (Nick Lowery kick), 14:56. Chiefs 14–3. **Drive: 8 plays, 71 yards, 4:17.**
- KC – Mike Pruitt 1-yard run (Nick Lowery kick), 11:41. Chiefs 21–3. **Drive: 4 plays, 54 yards, 1:05.**
- KC – Stephone Paige 84-yard pass from Bill Kenney (Nick Lowery kick), 2:25. Chiefs 28–3. **Drive: 3 plays, 82 yards, 1:52.**
- KC – Jonathan Hayes 6-yard pass from Bill Kenney (Nick Lowery kick), 1:26. Chiefs 35–3. **Drive: 2 plays, 26 yards, 0:11.**
- SD – Bob Thomas 26-yard field goal, 0:00. Chiefs 35–6. **Drive: 10 plays, 63 yards, 1:21.**

**Third quarter**

- SD – Wes Chandler 5-yard pass from Mark Herrmann (Bob Thomas kick), 8:19. Chiefs 35–13. **Drive: 3 plays, 7 yards, 1:28.**
- KC – Nick Lowery 34-yard field goal, 4:09. Chiefs 38–13. **Drive: 10 plays, 60 yards, 4:02.**

**Fourth quarter**

- SD – Tim Spencer 2-yard run (Bob Thomas kick), 9:42. Chiefs 38–20. **Drive: 13 plays, 88 yards, 4:36.**
- SD – Lionel James 8-yard pass from Mark Herrmann (Bob Thomas kick), 5:44. Chiefs 38–27. **Drive: 10 plays, 55 yards, 3:47.**
- SD – Trumaine Johnson 20-yard pass from Mark Herrmann (Bob Thomas kick), 2:48. Chiefs 38–34. **Drive: 10 plays, 80 yards, 1:38.**

**Top passers**

- SD – Mark Herrmann – 37/58, 362 yards, 3 TD, 3 INT
- KC – Bill Kenney – 9/16, 200 yards, 2 TD

**Top rushers**

- SD – Gary Anderson – 12 rushes, 72 yards
- KC – Herman Heard – 10 rushes, 47 yards, TD

**Top receivers**

- SD – Gary Anderson – 9 receptions, 91 yards
- KC – Stephone Paige – 8 receptions, 309 yards, 2 TD

=== Standings ===
AFC West
| | W | L | T | PCT | DIV | CONF | PF | PA | STK |
|---|---|---|---|---|---|---|---|---|---|
| ^{(1)} Los Angeles Raiders | 12 | 4 | 0 | .750 | 5–3 | 9–3 | 354 | 308 | W6 |
| Denver Broncos | 11 | 5 | 0 | .688 | 5–3 | 8–4 | 380 | 329 | W2 |
| Seattle Seahawks | 8 | 8 | 0 | .500 | 4–4 | 6–6 | 349 | 303 | L2 |
| San Diego Chargers | 8 | 8 | 0 | .500 | 3–5 | 7–7 | 467 | 435 | L1 |
| Kansas City Chiefs | 6 | 10 | 0 | .375 | 3–5 | 4–8 | 317 | 360 | W1 |
