= Stephone Paige =

American football player (born 1961)

No. 83
- Position: Wide receiver

Personal information
- Born: October 15, 1961 (age 65); Slidell, Louisiana, U.S.
- Listed height: 6 ft 2 in (1.88 m)
- Listed weight: 185 lb (84 kg)

Career information
- High school: Long Beach Polytechnic (Long Beach, California)
- College: Fresno State
- NFL draft: 1983: undrafted

Career history
- Kansas City Chiefs (1983–1992); Minnesota Vikings (1993)*
- * Offseason or practice squad member only

Career NFL statistics
- Receptions: 377
- Receiving yards: 6,341
- Receiving touchdowns: 49
- Stats at Pro Football Reference

Stephone Paige (born October 15, 1961) is an American former professional football player who was a wide receiver for the Kansas City Chiefs of the National Football League (NFL). An undrafted free agent after playing college football for the Fresno State Bulldogs, Paige played in nine seasons for the Chiefs.

== Early life ==
Paige attended and played high school football at Long Beach Polytechnic High School.

== College career ==
Paige attended and played college football at California State University, Fresno.

In the 1982 season, Paige had six receptions for 176 receiving yards and three touchdowns against Pacific. In the 1982 California Bowl, Paige scored three touchdowns and 246 receiving yards, both school records, in the 29–28 victory over Bowling Green. At the time of the bowl game, Paige's 246 receiving yards were an NCAA single-bowl game record that has since been passed numerous times.

== Professional career ==
Paige went undrafted in the 1983 NFL draft and later joined the Kansas City Chiefs.

=== 1983 season ===
In Week 6, against the Los Angeles Raiders, Paige recorded his first NFL touchdown on a 36-yard reception in the first quarter of the 21–20 loss. He scored two receiving touchdowns in a 41–38 loss to the San Diego Chargers in Week 15. He finished his rookie season with 30 receptions for 528 receiving yards and six receiving touchdowns.

=== 1984 season ===
Paige finished his second NFL season with 30 receptions for 541 receiving yards and four receiving touchdowns. Paige tied Carlos Carson and Henry Marshall for the team lead in receiving touchdowns in 1984.

=== 1985 season ===
In the 1985 season, Paige recorded 43 receptions for 943 receiving yards and ten receiving touchdowns. He had three games on the season with multiple receiving touchdowns. He led the team in receiving yards and receiving touchdowns in 1985.

==== Record-breaking game ====
On December 22, 1985, in Week 16, the regular season finale, Paige had 309 receiving yards on eight receptions against the San Diego Chargers. Paige's record-setting performance was the first 300-yard game seen in the NFL since Cloyce Box accomplished the feat in 1950. He broke Jim Benton's mark of 303 yards that had lasted for over 40 years. Paige accomplished the feat with only eight receptions for a 38.63 yards-per-catch average. No other 300-yard game had been accomplished on less than 12 receptions. Paige's mark remained an NFL single-game record until it was broken in 1989 by Flipper Anderson of the Los Angeles Rams with a 336-yard performance in an overtime game. Paige's 309-yard performance remained the NFL record for a regulation game until Calvin Johnson broke the mark with a 329-yard day in the 2013 season. Paige was named AFC Offensive Player of the Week for his historic game. Paige ended up leading the NFL in the 1985 season in yards per reception with 21.9, undoubtedly bolstered by his record-breaking game.

=== 1986 season ===
Paige had two games with multiple receiving touchdowns in the 1986 season, Week 7 against the San Diego Chargers and Week 12 against the St. Louis Cardinals. His lone game going over the 100-yard mark came in Week 13 against the Buffalo Bills. In the 1986 season, Paige finished with 52 receptions for 829 receiving yards and 11 receiving touchdowns. He led the team in all major receiving categories.

=== 1987 season ===
In Week 8, against the Chicago Bears, Paige had five receptions for 121 receiving yards and one touchdown in the 31–28 loss. Paige played in 12 games and recorded 43 receptions for 707 receiving yards and four receiving touchdowns in the 1987 season.

=== 1988 season ===
In Week 14 against the New York Jets, Paige had four receptions for 113 receiving yards and two receiving touchdowns in the 38–34 victory. In the 1988 season, Paige recorded 61 receptions for 902 receiving yards and seven receiving touchdowns. He led the team in all major receiving categories.

=== 1989 season ===
In Week 8, against the Pittsburgh Steelers, Paige had seven receptions for 163 yards in the 23–17 loss. In Week 13, against the Miami Dolphins, he had seven receptions for 133 receiving yards and a touchdown in the 26–21 victory. Paige played in 14 games and recorded 44 receptions for 759 receiving yards and two receiving touchdowns in the 1989 season. Paige led the team in receptions and receiving yards. Despite having only two receiving touchdowns, Paige tied for the team lead with Emile Harry, Jonathan Hayes, and Robb Thomas.

=== 1990 season ===
In Week 2, against the Denver Broncos, Paige had ten receptions for 206 receiving yards and two receiving touchdowns in the 24–23 loss. In Week 13, against the New England Patriots, he had seven receptions for 151 receiving yards and one receiving touchdown in the 37–7 victory. The 1990 season marked Paige's most productive year as a professional with 65 receptions for 1,021 yards and five touchdowns. He led the team in receptions and receiving yards. He tied with Bill Jones for the team lead in receiving touchdowns. In the Wild Card Round of the 1990–91 season, Paige had eight receptions for 142 receiving yards and one receiving touchdown in the 17–16 loss to the Miami Dolphins.

=== 1991 season ===
In the 1991 season, Paige suffered a knee injury, which limited him to three games. He was declared out for the season after Week 5. After the 1991 season, the Chiefs released Paige.

Between 1985 and 1991, Paige had at least one reception for 83 consecutive games, a team record until it was broken on January 1, 2006, by tight end Tony Gonzalez.

Paige was signed by the Minnesota Vikings in 1993 but did not record any statistics with the team.

== NFL career statistics ==
=== Regular season ===
Year	Team	Games		Receiving				
Year	Team	GP	GS	Rec	Yds	Avg	Lng	TD
1983	KC	16	0	30	528	17.6	43	6
1984	KC	16	1	30	541	18.0	65	4
1985	KC	16	8	43	943	21.9	84	10
1986	KC	16	15	52	829	15.9	51	11
1987	KC	12	11	43	707	16.4	51	4
1988	KC	16	16	61	902	14.8	49	7
1989	KC	14	12	44	759	17.3	50	2
1990	KC	16	16	65	1,021	15.7	86	5
1991	KC	3	2	9	111	12.3	26	0
Career		125	81	377	6,341	16.8	86	49

== Personal life ==
Paige is married has three children. Paige's sister Faye Mohammad was a basketball player and track athlete at Long Beach State. He is the uncle of NBA player Shabazz Muhammad and tennis player Asia Muhammad.
