= 1984 All-Pro Team =

Official list of the best NFL players in 1984

The 1984 All-Pro Team is composed of the National Football League players that were named to the Associated Press, Newspaper Enterprise Association, Pro Football Writers Association, Pro Football Weekly, and The Sporting News in 1984. Both first- and second- teams are listed for the AP and NEA teams. These are the five teams that are included in Total Football II: The Official Encyclopedia of the National Football League. In 1984 the Pro Football Writers Association chose only one defensive tackle and two inside linebackers in a pure 3-4 format. Pro Football Weekly added a "Special Teams" player, a non-returner who excelled in special teams play.

== Teams ==
Offense
Position	First team	Second team
Quarterback	Dan Marino, Miami Dolphins (AP, NEA, PFWA, PFW, TSN)	Joe Montana, San Francisco 49ers (AP-2, NEA-2)
Running back	Walter Payton, Chicago Bears (AP, NEA, PFWA, PFW, TSN); Eric Dickerson, Los Angeles Rams (AP, NEA, PFWA, PFW, TSN)	Marcus Allen, Los Angeles Raiders (AP-2, NEA-2); James Wilder, Tampa Bay Buccaneers (AP-2, NEA-2)
Wide receiver	Art Monk, Washington Redskins (AP, PFWA, PFW, TSN); Roy Green, St. Louis Cardinals (AP, NEA, PFWA, PFW, TSN); James Lofton, Green Bay Packers (NEA)	Steve Largent, Seattle Seahawks (AP-2); Mark Clayton, Miami Dolphins (AP-2); John Stallworth, Pittsburgh Steelers (NEA-2); Art Monk, Washington Redskins (NEA-2)
Tight end	Ozzie Newsome, Cleveland Browns (AP, NEA, PFWA, PFW, TSN)	Todd Christensen, Los Angeles Raiders (AP-2); Paul Coffman, Green Bay Packers (NEA-2)
Tackle	Keith Fahnhorst, San Francisco 49ers (AP, NEA, PFWA, PFW); Joe Jacoby, Washington Redskins (AP, PFWA, TSN); Anthony Muñoz, Cincinnati Bengals (NEA, TSN); Bill Bain, Los Angeles Rams (PFW)	Brian Holloway, New England Patriots (NEA-2); Joe Jacoby, Washington Redskins (NEA-2); Anthony Muñoz, Cincinnati Bengals (AP-2); Bill Bain, Los Angeles Rams (AP-2)
Guard	Russ Grimm, Washington Redskins (AP, NEA, PFWA); John Hannah, New England Patriots (NEA, PFWA, TSN); Ed Newman, Miami Dolphins (AP, PFW); Randy Cross, San Francisco 49ers (PFW); Sean Farrell, Tampa Bay Buccaneers (TSN)	Mike Munchak, Houston Oilers (NEA-2); Randy Cross, San Francisco 49ers (AP-2, NEA-2); John Hannah, New England Patriots (AP-2, NEA-2)
Center	Dwight Stephenson, Miami Dolphins (AP, NEA, PFWA, PFW, TSN)	Mike Webster, Pittsburgh Steelers (AP-2); Randy Clark, St. Louis Cardinals (NEA-2)

Special teams
Position	First team	Second team
Kicker	Norm Johnson, Seattle Seahawks (AP, PFWA, PFW, TSN); Jan Stenerud, Minnesota Vikings (NEA)	Norm Johnson, Seattle Seahawks (NEA-2); Jan Stenerud, Minnesota Vikings (AP-2)
Punter	Reggie Roby, Miami Dolphins (AP, NEA, PFWA, PFW, TSN)	Rohn Stark, Indianapolis Colts (NEA-2); Jim Arnold, Kansas City Chiefs (AP-2)
Kick Returner	Bobby Humphery, New York Jets (PFWA, PFW, TSN); Henry Ellard, Los Angeles Rams (AP)	Louis Lipps, Pittsburgh Steelers (AP-2)
Punt Returner	Louis Lipps, Pittsburgh Steelers (PFWA, PFW); Henry Ellard, Los Angeles Rams (TSN)	
Special Teams	Fredd Young, Seattle Seahawks (PFW)	

Defense
Position	First team	Second team
Defensive end	Howie Long, Los Angeles Raiders (AP, NEA, PFWA); Mark Gastineau, New York Jets (AP, NEA, PFWA, PFW, TSN); Richard Dent, Chicago Bears (PFW); Jacob Green, Seattle Seahawks (TSN)	Art Still, Kansas City Chiefs (AP-2); Lee Roy Selmon, Tampa Bay Buccaneers (NEA-2); Richard Dent, Chicago Bears (AP-2); Jacob Green, Seattle Seahawks (NEA-2)
Defensive tackle	Dan Hampton, Chicago Bears (AP, NEA, PFW, TSN); Randy White, Dallas Cowboys (AP, NEA, PFWA, PFW); Joe Nash, Seattle Seahawks (AP-NT, PFW-NT); David Logan, Tampa Bay Buccaneers (TSN)	Doug English, Detroit Lions (AP-2); Dave Butz, Washington Redskins (AP-2); Bob Baumhower, Miami Dolphins (AP-2-NT); Gary Dunn, Pittsburgh Steelers (NEA-2); Joe Nash, Seattle Seahawks (NEA-2)
Middle linebacker	E. J. Junior, St. Louis Cardinals (AP, NEA, PFWA); Mike Singletary, Chicago Bears (AP, NEA, PFWA, PFW, TSN); Jim Collins, Los Angeles Rams (PFW); Harry Carson, New York Giants (TSN)	Jim Collins, Los Angeles Rams (AP-2); Steve Nelson, New England Patriots (NEA-2); Tom Cousineau, Cleveland Browns (AP-2); Harry Carson, New York Giants (NEA-2)
Outside linebacker	Lawrence Taylor, New York Giants (AP, NEA, PFWA, PFW, TSN); Rod Martin, Los Angeles Raiders (AP, PFWA); Clay Matthews Jr., Cleveland Browns (NEA, TSN); Mike Merriweather, Pittsburgh Steelers (PFW)	Rickey Jackson, New Orleans Saints (AP-2, NEA-2); Clay Matthews Jr., Cleveland Browns (AP-2); Mike Merriweather, Pittsburgh Steelers (NEA-2)
Cornerback	Mike Haynes, Los Angeles Raiders (AP, NEA, PFWA, PFW, TSN); Mark Haynes, New York Giants (AP, NEA); Louis Wright, Denver Broncos (PFW, TSN); Lester Hayes, Los Angeles Raiders (PFWA)	Eric Wright, San Francisco 49ers (AP-2); Dave Brown, Seattle Seahawks (AP-2); Gary Green, Los Angeles Rams (NEA-2); Louis Wright, Denver Broncos (NEA-2)
Safety	Kenny Easley, Seattle Seahawks (AP, NEA, PFWA-SS, PFW, TSN); Deron Cherry, Kansas City Chiefs (AP); Michael Downs, Dallas Cowboys (PFWA-FS); Todd Bell, Chicago Bears (TSN); Wes Hopkins, Philadelphia Eagles (NEA); Dennis Smith, Denver Broncos (PFW)	Vann McElroy, Los Angeles Raiders (NEA-2); Deron Cherry, Kansas City Chiefs (NEA-2); Michael Downs, Dallas Cowboys (AP-2); Todd Bell, Chicago Bears (AP-2)

== Key ==
- AP = Associated Press first-team All-Pro
- AP-2 = Associated Press second-team All-Pro
- NEA = Newspaper Enterprise Association first-team All-Pro team
- NEA-2 = Newspaper Enterprise Association second-team All-Pro team
- PFW = Pro Football Weekly All-Pro team
- PFWA = Pro Football Writers Association All-NFL
- TSN = The Sporting News All-Pro
