= Albert Lewis (American football) =

American football player (born 1960)

No. 29
- Position: Cornerback

Personal information
- Born: October 6, 1960 (age 66); Mansfield, Louisiana, U.S.
- Listed height: 6 ft 2 in (1.88 m)
- Listed weight: 205 lb (93 kg)

Career information
- High school: DeSoto (Mansfield)
- College: Grambling State (1979–1982)
- NFL draft: 1983: 3rd round, 61st overall pick

Career history
- Kansas City Chiefs (1983–1993); Los Angeles / Oakland Raiders (1994–1998)

Awards and highlights
- 2× First-team All-Pro (1989, 1990); 4× Pro Bowl (1987–1990); Kansas City Chiefs Hall of Fame

Career NFL statistics
- Tackles: 832
- Interceptions: 42
- Sacks: 12.5
- Touchdowns: 1
- Stats at Pro Football Reference

Albert Ray Lewis (born October 6, 1960) is an American former professional football player who was a cornerback in the National Football League (NFL) for the Kansas City Chiefs and the Los Angeles/Oakland Raiders. He played college football for the Grambling State Tigers.

== Early life and career ==
Lewis was a third-round draft pick (61st overall) by the Chiefs in the 1983 NFL draft. His career spanned 16 seasons in which he recorded 42 interceptions, 12.5 sacks, 13 forced fumbles, 13 fumbles recoveries and 2 touchdowns. In addition to his play on defense, Lewis blocked 11 kicks in 11 seasons with the Chiefs.

Lewis was named the Chiefs MVP for the 1986 season after he recorded 69 tackles (61 solo), four interceptions, two fumble recoveries, one sack and one blocked punt. During his time in Kansas City, the Chiefs made the playoffs five times. This included an appearance in the 1993 AFC Championship game. Lewis finished with 38 interceptions in 11 seasons with the Chiefs, the fifth-highest total in franchise history. Twenty of those came in his first four seasons before opposing teams decided not to throw to his side of the field as much. He played in 150 games for the Chiefs and was a starter in 128 of them. Lewis spent the final five seasons of his career with the Raiders. While with the team, he became the oldest player to score a defensive touchdown (38 years, 26 days) on November 1, 1998, when he returned an interception 74 yards for a touchdown against the Seattle Seahawks, his first and only interception return for a touchdown in his career.

Lewis retired from the NFL after the 1998 season.

Lewis was known for his excellent acceleration and speed, at one point running a 4.38 in the 40-yard dash. At 6' 2", he was one of the tallest cornerbacks in the NFL at the time. He also had 35-inch long arms and a 38-inch vertical leap. Lewis credited his strong determination and work-ethic to his father, Brad.

== Legacy ==
Lewis was named to the Chiefs 25-Year All-Time Team in 1987 and was inducted into the Chiefs Hall of Fame on March 4, 2007.

In 1999, Lewis bought Greystone, a 320 acres (130 ha) horse ranch north in Centreville, Mississippi.

In July 2008, Lewis, along with former Chiefs teammate Kevin Ross, was named to the NFL Network's "Top 10 Cornerback Tandems" list. He was named as a finalist for the Pro Football Hall of Fame for the first time in 2023.

== NFL career statistics ==
Legend
**Bold**	Career high

=== Regular season ===
Year	Team	Games		Tackles					Interceptions					Fumbles			AllTD
Year	Team	GP	GS	Cmb	Solo	Ast	Sck	Sfty	Int	Yds	Y/I	Lng	TD	FF	FR	TD	AllTD
1983	KC	16	1	36	–	–	—	—	4	42	10.5	34	0	0	2	0	—
1984	KC	15	15	69	–	–	1.0	—	4	57	14.3	31	0	0	0	0	—
1985	KC	16	16	**74**	–	–	1.5	—	**8**	59	7.4	16	0	1	1	**1**	**1**
1986	KC	15	15	69	–	–	1.0	—	4	18	4.5	13	0	1	2	0	—
1987	KC	12	12	43	–	–	–	—	1	0	0.0	0	0	0	1	0	—
1988	KC	14	12	45	–	–	–	**1**	1	19	19.0	19	0	0	1	0	—
1989	KC	16	16	57	–	–	1.0	—	4	37	9.3	22	0	0	0	0	—
1990	KC	15	14	58	–	–	–	–	2	15	7.5	15	0	0	**3**	0	—
1991	KC	8	6	18	–	–	–	–	3	21	7.0	21	0	0	0	0	—
1992	KC	9	8	30	–	–	–	–	1	0	0.0	0	0	1	0	0	—
1993	KC	14	13	56	–	–	–	–	6	61	10.2	24	0	1	2	0	—
1994	RAI	14	9	45	39	6	1.0	–	–	–	–	–	–	1	0	0	—
1995	OAK	16	15	57	49	8	1.0	–	–	–	–	–	–	1	1	0	—
1996	OAK	16	13	54	48	6	**3.0**	–	2	0	0.0	0	0	1	0	0	—
1997	OAK	14	11	63	**54**	**9**	2.0	–	–	–	–	–	–	**2**	0	0	—
1998	OAK	15	12	58	52	6	1.0	–	2	**74**	**37.0**	**74**	**1**	1	0	0	**1**
Career		255	188	832	242	35	12.5	1	42	403	9.6	74	1	13	13	1	2

== Personal life ==
Lewis has three children. His son Julian is a former defensive back for the University of New Mexico.
