= Kevin Ross (American football) =

American football player and coach (born 1962)

Personal information
- Born: January 16, 1962 (age 64); Camden, New Jersey, U.S.
- Listed height: 5 ft 9 in (1.75 m)
- Listed weight: 182 lb (83 kg)

Career information
- Position: Defensive back (No. 31, 36)
- High school: Paulsboro (Paulsboro, New Jersey)
- College: Temple
- NFL draft: 1984: 7th round, 173rd overall pick

Career history

Playing
- Kansas City Chiefs (1984–1993); Atlanta Falcons (1994–1995); San Diego Chargers (1996); Kansas City Chiefs (1997)

Coaching
- Minnesota Vikings (2004–2006) Defensive backs coach; San Diego Chargers (2007–2009) Defensive backs coach & defensive quality control coach; Oakland Raiders (2010–2011) Defensive backs coach; Arizona Cardinals (2013–2017) Cornerbacks coach; Tampa Bay Buccaneers (2019–2025) Cornerbacks coach

Awards and highlights
- As a player: Second-team All-Pro (1990); 2× Pro Bowl (1989, 1990); PFWA All-Rookie Team (1984); Kansas City Chiefs Hall of Fame; Second-team All-East (1983); As a coach: Super Bowl champion (LV)

Career NFL statistics
- Interceptions: 38
- Interception yards: 654
- Total touchdowns: 6
- Stats at Pro Football Reference

Kevin Lesley Ross (born January 16, 1962) is an American professional football coach and former player who was most recently the cornerbacks coach for the Tampa Bay Buccaneers of the National Football League (NFL). He played in the NFL as a cornerback and safety.

Ross was selected in the seventh round of the 1984 NFL draft with the 173rd overall selection by the Kansas City Chiefs, where he spent his first 10 seasons. He also played two seasons with the Atlanta Falcons, one year with the San Diego Chargers, then returned to the Chiefs for one season in 1997.

== Playing career ==
Ross played high school football at Paulsboro High School in Paulsboro, New Jersey, and went on to attend Temple University.

As the Chiefs' seventh pick in the 1984 NFL draft, he became a starter his rookie season and perfected a classic bump-and-run coverage that made him hard to beat in the secondary. For his career with the Kansas City Chiefs, he intercepted 30 passes and scored 5 touchdowns. Ross played in a total of 156 games for the Chiefs. He went to Atlanta as a free agent before the 1994 season and later returned to play in five games in 1997.

Along with former teammate Albert Lewis, Ross was named one of the NFL's top 10 all-time cornerback tandems by the NFL Network in July 2008.

Ross went to two NFL Pro Bowls and was inducted into the Kansas City Hall of Fame in 2011. He is one of only three players in franchise history to score a touchdown in at least four different ways (two INTs, two blocked field goal returns, one fumble recovery and one blocked punt).

== Coaching career ==
=== San Diego Chargers ===
Ross was the assistant secondary and quality control coach with the San Diego Chargers from 2007 to 2009. After the Chargers' 2009 playoff loss to the Pittsburgh Steelers, the Chargers' administration announced that they would not renew his contract for the following season.

=== Oakland Raiders ===
Ross was hired by the Oakland Raiders on March 5, 2010, as a defensive backs coach. He was not retained following the 2011 season.

=== Arizona Cardinals ===
Ross was hired by the Arizona Cardinals and reunited with Bruce Arians to become the cornerbacks coach in 2013. He held that position until 2017.

=== Tampa Bay Buccaneers ===
Ross was hired by the Tampa Bay Buccaneers in 2019, again working with Bruce Arians, to become the cornerbacks coach. As a coach for the Buccaneers, he won Super Bowl LV defeating the team he played eleven seasons for, the Chiefs, 31–9, which was his first Super Bowl victory as a coach.

On January 8, 2026, Ross was fired by the Buccaneers.

== NFL career statistics ==
Legend
	Led the league
**Bold**	Career high

=== Regular season ===
Year	Team	Games		Tackles				Interceptions					Fumbles			AllTD
Year	Team	GP	GS	Cmb	Solo	Ast	Sck	Int	Yds	Y/I	Lng	TD	FF	FR	TD	AllTD
1984	KC	**16**	**16**	98	–	–	–	**6**	**124**	20.7	71	**1**	0	1	0	**1**
1985	KC	**16**	15	**111**	–	–	–	3	47	15.7	27	0	0	1	0	—
1986	KC	**16**	**16**	93	–	–	**2.0**	4	66	16.5	35	0	0	**3**	**1**	**1**
1987	KC	12	11	58	–	–	1.0	3	40	13.3	40	0	0	0	0	—
1988	KC	15	14	99	–	–	–	1	0	0.0	0	0	0	0	0	—
1989	KC	15	13	75	–	–	—	4	29	7.3	23	0	0	0	0	—
1990	KC	**16**	15	64	–	–	–	5	97	19.4	40	0	0	**3**	0	—
1991	KC	14	13	68	–	–	–	1	0	0.0	0	0	0	1	0	—
1992	KC	**16**	**16**	58	–	–	0.5	1	99	**99.0**	**99**	**1**	1	2	0	**1**
1993	KC	15	15	102	–	–	0.5	2	49	24.5	48	0	1	1	0	—
1994	ATL	**16**	**16**	104	**80**	**24**	1.0	3	26	8.7	16	0	**2**	0	0	—
1995	ATL	**16**	15	90	72	18	–	3	70	23.3	33	0	0	2	0	—
1996	SD	**16**	**16**	78	67	11	–	2	7	3.5	7	0	**2**	1	0	—
1997	KC	5	0	1	1	0	–	–	–	–	–	–	0	0	0	—
Career		204	191	1,099	220	53	5.0	38	654	17.2	99	2	6	15	1	3
