= Bill Kenney =

American football player and politician (born 1955)

Commissioner of the Missouri Public Service Commission
- In office January 24, 2013 – May 6, 2021
- Succeeded by: Glen Kolkmeyer

Majority Leader of the Missouri Senate
- In office January 2001 – January 2003

Member of the Missouri Senate from the 8th district
- In office January 1995 – January 2003
- Succeeded by: Matt Bartle

Personal details
- Born: January 20, 1955 (age 71) San Francisco, California, U.S.
- Party: Republican
- Education: Saddleback College (AA); University of Northern Colorado (BA)
- Football career

No. 9
- Position: Quarterback

Personal information
- Listed height: 6 ft 4 in (1.93 m)
- Listed weight: 211 lb (96 kg)

Career information
- High school: San Clemente (San Clemente, California)
- College: Northern Colorado
- NFL draft: 1978: 12th round, 333 (By the Miami Dolphins)th overall pick

Career history
- Miami Dolphins (1978)*; Washington Redskins (1978)*; Kansas City Chiefs (1979–1988); Washington Redskins (1989)
- * Offseason or practice squad member only

Awards and highlights
- Pro Bowl (1983)

Career NFL statistics
- Passing attempts: 2,430
- Passing completions: 1,330
- Completion percentage: 54.7%
- TD–INT: 105–86
- Passing yards: 17,277
- Passer rating: 77
- Stats at Pro Football Reference

William Patrick Kenney (born January 20, 1955) is an American former quarterback who spent nine years in the National Football League (NFL) with the Kansas City Chiefs from 1980 to 1988 and a former politician who spent eight years as a Missouri State Senator. Kenney was selected by the Miami Dolphins in the 12th round of the 1978 NFL draft.

== Early life and college ==
Kenney was born in San Francisco and graduated from San Clemente High School in 1973. He originally received a scholarship to play at Arizona State University but did not play his first year. He then transferred to small Saddleback College, where he played for one season. He spent the remainder of his college career at the University of Northern Colorado. Kenney finished his Northern Colorado career with totals of 1,496 yards, nine touchdowns, and 12 interceptions.

== NFL ==
Kenney was selected by the Miami Dolphins with the second to last pick of the 1978 NFL draft. He was cut from the Dolphins at the end of training camp, but he had more success two years later, when he made the Kansas City Chiefs roster as the backup to Steve Fuller. He ended up starting games late in the year because of an injury to Fuller and did exceptionally well. His late season performance helped him to take over the starting job for good in 1981.

After an average 1982 season, Kenney was in line to be replaced by Todd Blackledge, whom the Chiefs drafted as part of the vaunted Quarterback class of 1983. Kenney responded by having a breakout season, setting team records for passing yards (4,348) and completions (346) in a season; the latter was also good enough to lead the NFL. Kenney earned a Pro Bowl berth that season. At one point, he threw for over 300 yards in 4 games in a row, topping out at 417 yards in a loss to Seattle. Unfortunately for Kenney and the Chiefs, they would lose all four games.

He did not come close to matching his 4,000-yard output over the next four seasons, but he did enough to prevent Blackledge from starting when he was healthy (in 1984, he missed 7 weeks due to a thumb injury). He eventually gave up his starting job in 1988 when the Chiefs traded for Steve DeBerg. Kenney was released after failing to throw a touchdown pass in 114 attempts that season. He left the Chiefs as the second most prolific passer in team history behind Hall of Famer Len Dawson. He has been passed in most passing categories since then by Trent Green; Green also broke Kenney's single season record for passing yards in 2004.

In 1989, he signed with the Washington Redskins to be the third quarterback behind Mark Rypien and Doug Williams. He did not appear in any games with the team, however, and he retired after the season.

== Politics ==
Kenney took up residency in Lee's Summit, Missouri after his retirement. He turned his attention to politics at this time, and in 1994, he successfully ran as a Republican to represent a portion of Kansas City and parts of suburban Jackson County in the Missouri State Senate. In 1996, Kenney ran an unsuccessful campaign to become Lieutenant Governor of Missouri.

In 2001, Bill Kenney became the majority floor leader of the Missouri Senate, and held the position for two years. He left the Senate afterwards due to term limits, and retired from politics altogether as a result.

Kenney was appointed to the Missouri Public Service Commission by Governor Jay Nixon on January 9, 2013. On January 24, 2013, he was confirmed by the Missouri Senate to a six-year term.

== Career statistics ==
=== NFL ===
Legend
	Led the league
**Bold**	Career high

Year	Team	Games			Passing								
Year	Team	GP	GS	Record	Cmp	Att	Pct	Yds	Avg	TD	Int	Lng	Rtg
1980	KC	3	3	2−1	37	69	53.6	542	**7.9**	5	2	75	**91.6**
1981	KC	13	13	**8−5**	147	274	53.6	1,983	7.2	9	16	64	63.6
1982	KC	7	6	3−3	95	169	56.2	1,192	7.1	7	6	51	77.3
1983	KC	**16**	**16**	6−10	**346**	**603**	**57.4**	**4,348**	7.2	**24**	**18**	53	80.8
1984	KC	9	8	4−4	151	282	53.5	2,098	7.4	15	10	65	80.7
1985	KC	**16**	10	3−7	181	338	53.6	2,536	7.5	17	9	**84**	83.6
1986	KC	15	8	5−3	161	308	52.3	1,922	6.2	13	11	53	70.8
1987	KC	11	8	3−5	154	273	56.4	2,107	7.7	15	9	81	85.8
1988	KC	**16**	5	0−5	58	114	50.9	549	4.8	0	5	25	46.3
Career		106	77	34−43	1,330	2,430	54.7	17,277	7.1	105	86	84	77.0

=== College ===
Northern Colorado Bears
Season	Passing					Rushing		
Season	Comp	Att	Yards	TD	Int	Att	Yds	TD
1976	18	40	232	2	2	31	58	0
1977	97	226	1,264	7	10	79	-59	
Career	115	266	1,496	9	12	110	-1	

Party political offices
Preceded by Margaret B. Kelly	Republican nominee for Lieutenant Governor of Missouri; 1996	Succeeded by Wendell Bailey
