= Deron Cherry =

American football player (born 1959)

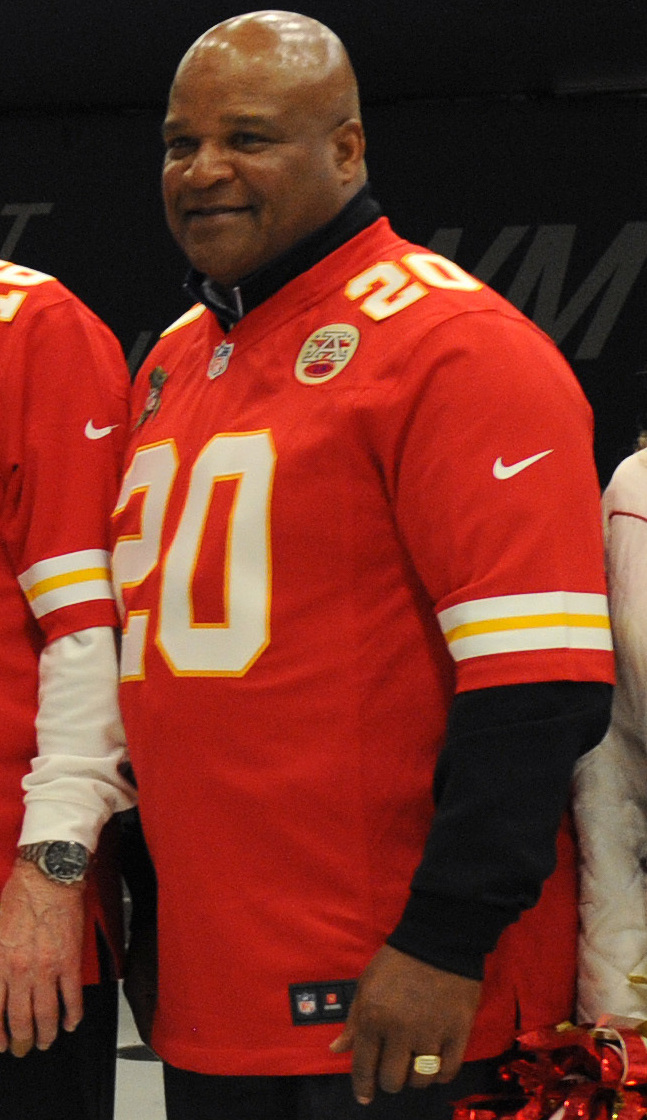

No. 20
- Position: Safety

Personal information
- Born: September 12, 1959 (age 67); Riverside Township, New Jersey, U.S.
- Listed height: 5 ft 11 in (1.80 m)
- Listed weight: 203 lb (92 kg)

Career information
- High school: Palmyra (NJ)
- College: Rutgers
- NFL draft: 1981: undrafted

Career history
- Kansas City Chiefs (1981–1991)

Awards and highlights
- 3× First-team All-Pro (1984, 1986, 1988); 2× Second-team All-Pro (1983, 1985); 6× Pro Bowl (1983–1988); "Whizzer" White NFL Man of the Year Award (1988); NFL 1980s All-Decade Team; Kansas City Chiefs Hall of Fame; 2× Second-team All-East (1979, 1980); NFL record: Most passes intercepted in a single game: 4 (tied)

Career NFL statistics
- Total tackles: 927
- Sacks: 3.5
- Interceptions: 50
- Fumble recoveries: 15
- Touchdowns: 1
- Stats at Pro Football Reference

Deron Leigh Cherry (born September 12, 1959) is an American former professional football player who was a safety for the Kansas City Chiefs in the National Football League (NFL) from 1981 to 1991. Cherry was a free safety and punter at Rutgers University, intercepting a total of 9 passes over his three seasons, which he returned for 126 yards and two touchdowns. In 1979, he was named the team's MVP. In 1979 and 1980, Cherry earned AP All-East honors. In 1981, he was signed by the Kansas City Chiefs as a free agent but was released in the final teams cuts. Cherry rejoined the club as a safety, and made his first career interception against division rivals the Oakland Raiders.

Born in Riverside Township, New Jersey, Cherry grew up in nearby Palmyra, and played high school football at Palmyra High School. He was also on the high school basketball and baseball teams alongside his brother Duane, with both Cherrys being selected for the local "All-Group 1" baseball team.

Regarded as one of the best free safeties to have ever played the game, he was a six-time Pro Bowl selection from 1983 to 1988, starting in five of them in his 11 years with the Chiefs. Few other Chiefs players have been selected to this number of Pro Bowls. He had six 100 tackle seasons in his 11 years as a member of the Chiefs, with a career total of 927 tackles. He was a 5-time All-Pro in 1983, 1984, 1985, 1986, and 1988. He was also a five-time 1st team All-AFC and two-time 2nd team All-AFC selection. Cherry's 15 career fumble recoveries place him in a three-way tie for the Chiefs record. He ranks third on the Chiefs list of most interceptions, and is only the 26th player in the history of the NFL to reach the 50 interception plateau. In 1987, he was selected to the Chiefs 25-year All-Time Team.

In 1987, he won the Byron "Whizzer" White NFL Man of the Year Award. Prior to receiving this award, he was the Chiefs NFL Man of the Year selection in 1987. This is the most prestigious award given by the NFL Players Association.

He is actively involved in several civic organizations, including Special Olympics, Muscular Dystrophy Association, Project Warmth, Score 1 for Health, Camp Quality USA, and the United Negro College Fund. For the past 25 years, Cherry has hosted his Celebrity Invitational. This tournament has raised over $3 million to support the children of the Kansas City area. Cherry is a frequent guest speaker at civic, charitable, and corporate events throughout the country.

In 1995, Cherry became a limited ownership partner in one of the NFL's then-new expansion teams, the Jacksonville Jaguars. This made him the first minority owner of an NFL franchise in the league's history. Cherry is also a managing general partner with United Beverage, a local Anheuser-Busch distributor.

In 2019, the Professional Football Researchers Association named Cherry to the PFRA Hall of Very Good Class of 2019.

== NFL career statistics ==
Legend
	Led the league
**Bold**	Career high

=== Regular season ===
Year	Team	Games		Interceptions					Fumbles			
Year	Team	GP	GS	Int	Yds	Y/I	Lng	TD	FR	Yds	Y/F	TD
1981	KC	13	0	1	4	4.0	4	0	0	0	0.0	0
1982	KC	7	0	0	0	0.0	0	0	0	0	—	0
1983	KC	16	16	7	100	14.3	41	0	2	4	2.0	0
1984	KC	16	16	7	140	**20.0**	**67**	0	0	0	0.0	0
1985	KC	16	16	7	87	12.4	47	**1**	0	0	0.0	0
1986	KC	16	16	**9**	**150**	16.7	49	0	2	7	**3.5**	0
1987	KC	8	8	3	58	19.3	30	0	1	0	0.0	0
1988	KC	16	16	7	51	7.3	24	0	**6**	**10**	1.6	0
1989	KC	15	15	2	27	13.5	27	0	2	0	—	0
1990	KC	9	6	3	40	13.3	21	0	0	0	0.0	0
1991	KC	16	15	4	31	7.8	16	0	1	0	0.0	0
Career		148	124	50	688	13.8	67	1	14	21	1.5	0
