= Herman Heard =

American football player (born 1961)

No. 44
- Position: Running back

Personal information
- Born: November 24, 1961 (age 64); Denver, Colorado, U.S.
- Listed height: 5 ft 10 in (1.78 m)
- Listed weight: 184 lb (83 kg)

Career information
- High school: South (Denver)
- College: Colorado State University Pueblo
- NFL draft: 1984: 3rd round, 61st overall pick

Career history
- Kansas City Chiefs (1984–1989); Hamilton Tiger-Cats (1991)

Career NFL statistics
- Rushing yards: 2,694
- Rushing average: 4.1
- Total touchdowns: 16
- Stats at Pro Football Reference

Herman Willie Heard Jr. (born November 24, 1961) is an American former professional football player who was a running back in the National Football League (NFL). He played for the Kansas City Chiefs for six seasons and the Hamilton Tiger-Cats of the CFL for one season. Heard was a third-round pick by the Chiefs out of Colorado State University Pueblo. He played all of his NFL seasons in KC, garnering 13 rushing TDs and nearly 2,700 yards rushing in his career.

== NFL career statistics ==
Legend
**Bold**	Career high

=== Regular season ===
Year	Team	Games		Rushing					Receiving				
Year	Team	GP	GS	Att	Yds	Avg	Lng	TD	Rec	Yds	Avg	Lng	TD
1984	KAN	**16**	9	**165**	**684**	4.1	**69**	**4**	25	223	8.9	17	0
1985	KAN	**16**	**12**	164	595	3.6	33	**4**	**31**	**257**	8.3	27	**2**
1986	KAN	15	7	71	295	4.2	40	2	17	83	4.9	13	0
1987	KAN	12	6	82	466	**5.7**	64	3	14	118	8.4	15	0
1988	KAN	12	5	106	438	4.1	20	0	20	198	**9.9**	**32**	0
1989	KAN	**16**	10	63	216	3.4	28	0	25	246	9.8	27	1
		87	49	651	2,694	4.1	69	13	132	1,125	8.5	32	3

=== Playoffs ===
Year	Team	Games		Rushing					Receiving				
Year	Team	GP	GS	Att	Yds	Avg	Lng	TD	Rec	Yds	Avg	Lng	TD
1986	KAN	1	0	1	1	1.0	1	0	1	15	15.0	15	0
		1	0	1	1	1.0	1	0	1	15	15.0	15	0
