= Henry Marshall (American football) =

American football player (born 1954)

No. 89
- Position: Wide receiver

Personal information
- Born: August 9, 1954 (age 72); Broxton, Georgia, U.S.
- Listed height: 6 ft 2 in (1.88 m)
- Listed weight: 214 lb (97 kg)

Career information
- College: Missouri
- NFL draft: 1976: 3rd round, 79th overall pick

Career history
- Kansas City Chiefs (1976–1987)

Awards and highlights
- First-team All-American (1975); First-team All-Big Eight (1975)

Career NFL statistics
- Receptions: 416
- Receiving yards: 6,545
- Receiving touchdowns: 33
- Stats at Pro Football Reference

Henry Howard Marshall (born August 9, 1954), is an American former professional football player who was a wide receiver for the Kansas City Chiefs of the National Football League (NFL). He played college football for the Missouri Tigers and was selected by the Chiefs in the third round of the 1976 NFL draft. A 6'2", 212-lb. receiver, Marshall played his entire NFL career with the Chiefs from 1976 to 1987.

== Career ==
A model of consistency throughout his career, Henry Marshall came to the Chiefs as a third-round draft pick from the University of Missouri in 1976 and stayed for 12 productive seasons. Overcoming the label of a "bad hands" receiver early on, he became Kansas City's top receiver for most of his career.

Paul Wiggin, Marshall's first coach with the Chiefs, described the wide receiver as "a super kid who can be a premier player." Marshall became just that, and by the time he called it quits, he had caught 416 passes for 6,545 yards.

Marshall's climb to the top of the Chiefs' receiving records was not easy. The Chiefs had very poor teams in Marshall's first five seasons, and the most passes he caught in that time frame was just 28, and that was in his rookie season. and when Marv Levy took over the team in 1978, he installed a running offense, limiting Marshall's offensive contributions.

He had a breakout year in 1980 when the Chiefs returned to a pro-style offense. Marshall hauled in 47 receptions for 799 yards and 6 touchdowns and was one of the team's premier receivers through 1986. His best season was 1984 as he totaled 912 yards on 62 catches. For his career, Marshall played in 165 games for Kansas City and scored 35 touchdowns.

Marshall ranks second all-time for receptions in Chiefs history behind Tony Gonzalez.

== NFL career statistics ==
Legend
**Bold**	Career high

=== Regular season ===
Year	Team	Games		Receiving				
Year	Team	GP	GS	Rec	Yds	Avg	Lng	TD
1976	KAN	14	14	28	443	15.8	31	2
1977	KAN	14	13	23	445	**19.3**	49	4
1978	KAN	**16**	**16**	26	433	16.7	40	2
1979	KAN	**16**	12	21	332	15.8	38	1
1980	KAN	**16**	**16**	47	799	17.0	**75**	**6**
1981	KAN	12	12	38	620	16.3	64	4
1982	KAN	9	9	40	549	13.7	44	3
1983	KAN	13	9	50	788	15.8	52	**6**
1984	KAN	**16**	**16**	**62**	**912**	14.7	37	4
1985	KAN	11	9	25	446	17.8	50	0
1986	KAN	**16**	9	46	652	14.2	31	1
1987	KAN	12	0	10	126	12.6	19	0
Career		165	135	416	6,545	15.7	75	33

=== Playoffs ===
Year	Team	Games		Receiving				
Year	Team	GP	GS	Rec	Yds	Avg	Lng	TD
1986	KAN	**1**	**1**	**6**	**72**	**12.0**	**26**	0
Career		1	1	6	72	12.0	26	0
