= Carlos Carson =

American football player (born 1958)

No. 88, 87
- Position: Wide receiver

Personal information
- Born: December 28, 1958 (age 67); Lake Worth, Florida, U.S.
- Listed height: 5 ft 11 in (1.80 m)
- Listed weight: 180 lb (82 kg)

Career information
- High school: John I. Leonard (Greenacres, Florida)
- College: LSU
- NFL draft: 1980: 5th round, 114th overall pick

Career history
- Kansas City Chiefs (1980–1989); Philadelphia Eagles (1989)

Awards and highlights
- 2× Pro Bowl (1983, 1987); Kansas City Chiefs Hall of Fame; Second-team All-SEC (1977)

Career NFL statistics
- Receptions: 353
- Receiving yards: 6,372
- Receiving touchdowns: 33
- Stats at Pro Football Reference

Carlos Andre Carson (born December 28, 1958) is an American former professional football player who was a wide receiver for 10 seasons in the National Football League (NFL) from 1980 to 1989. He played college football for the LSU Tigers and was selected by the Kansas City Chiefs in the fifth round of the 1980 NFL draft. His best year came during the 1983 season when he caught 80 receptions for 1,351 yards and seven touchdowns. During that same season, Carson had the second most receiving yards in the NFL, only behind Philadelphia Eagles receiver Mike Quick with 1,409 yards.

As a high school senior, Carson was not heavily recruited. LSU coaches were reviewing film of another player on Carson's team but kept noticing this wide receiver making plays. When they contacted Carlos to ask him to visit LSU, he asked if they were offering him scholarship. The coach said yes and Carson accepted right then. In his first game as a starter at LSU he caught five touchdown passes against Rice University.

On February 26, 2017, Carson was announced as the 2017 inductee into the Chiefs Hall of Fame. He was officially inducted on October 30, 2017.

== NFL career statistics ==
=== Regular season ===
Year	Team	Games		Receiving				
Year	Team	GP	GS	Rec	Yds	Avg	Lng	TD
1980	KC	16	1	5	68	13.6	32	0
1981	KC	5	1	7	179	25.6	53	1
1982	KC	9	7	27	494	18.3	51	2
1983	KC	16	16	80	1,351	16.9	50	7
1984	KC	16	16	57	1,078	18.9	57	4
1985	KC	15	14	47	843	17.9	37	4
1986	KC	10	7	21	497	23.7	70	4
1987	KC	12	12	55	1,044	19.0	81	7
1988	KC	14	14	46	711	15.5	80	3
1989	KC	7	3	7	95	13.6	28	1
1989	PHI	6	1	1	12	12.0	12	0
Career		126	92	353	6,372	18.1	81	33
