= Jim Arnold (American football) =

American football player (born 1961)

No. 6
- Position: Punter

Personal information
- Born: January 31, 1961 (age 65); Dalton, Georgia, U.S.
- Listed height: 6 ft 3 in (1.91 m)
- Listed weight: 211 lb (96 kg)

Career information
- High school: Dalton
- College: Vanderbilt
- NFL draft: 1983: 5th round, 119th overall pick

Career history
- Kansas City Chiefs (1983–1985); Detroit Lions (1986–1993); Miami Dolphins (1994)

Awards and highlights
- First-team All-Pro (1987); Second-team All-Pro (1988); 2× Pro Bowl (1987, 1988); 2× NFL punting yards leader (1984, 1988); Detroit Lions 75th Anniversary Team; Golden Toe Award (1987); Unanimous All-American (1982); 3× First-team All-SEC (1980, 1981, 1982); Second-team All-SEC (1979)

Career NFL statistics
- Punts: 866
- Punting yards: 36,637
- Punting average: 42.3
- Stats at Pro Football Reference

James Edward Arnold (born January 31, 1961) is an American former professional football player who was a punter for 12 seasons in the National Football League (NFL) during the 1980s and 1990s. He was selected by the Kansas City Chiefs in the fifth round of the 1983 NFL Draft. Arnold played college football for the Vanderbilt Commodores, earning unanimous All-American honors. He played professionally for the Kansas City Chiefs, Detroit Lions, and Miami Dolphins of the NFL, and was a Pro Bowl selection twice.

Arnold was born in Dalton, Georgia.

== NFL career statistics ==
Legend
	Led the league
**Bold**	Career high

Regular season

Season	Team	GP	Punting					
Season	Team	GP	Punts	Yards	Y/P	Net	In20	TB
1983	KC	16	93	3,710	39.9	32.6	21	6
1984	KC	16	**98**	**4,397**	**44.9**	37.5	22	**13**
1985	KC	16	93	3,827	41.2	32.4	15	11
1986	DET	7	36	1,533	42.6	32.1	7	4
1987	DET	11	46	2,007	43.6	**39.6**	17	4
1988	DET	16	97	4,110	42.4	35.9	22	7
1989	DET	16	82	3,538	43.1	36.0	14	9
1990	DET	16	63	2,560	40.6	35.3	10	5
1991	DET	16	75	3,092	41.2	35.4	**27**	5
1992	DET	16	65	2,846	43.8	34.7	12	10
1993	DET	16	72	3,207	44.5	36.8	15	9
1994	MIA	12	46	1,810	39.3	33.5	14	4
Career		174	866	36,637	42.3	35.2	196	87
