= Jim Schaaf =

American football and baseball executive (1938–2022)

Jim Schaaf (May 22, 1938 – July 13, 2022) was an American football executive in the National Football League (NFL). He served as general manager for the Kansas City Chiefs from 1976 to 1988. Alongside his son, Schaaf owned and operated Jim Schaaf & Associates (established in 1989), a sports insurance firm.

From 1961 to 1966 Schaaf worked with the Kansas City Athletics of Major League Baseball. In 1966, he joined the Kansas City Chiefs front office staff. He was promoted to general manager after Jack Steadman left the role to become the Chiefs' vice president. Schaaf was fired in 1988 in favor of the Chiefs hiring Carl Peterson. Following this, he founded his insurance business.

Schaaf died from Alzheimer's disease in Overland Park, Kansas, on July 13, 2022, at the age of 84.
