= Walt Arnold =

American football player (born 1958)

No. 84, 86, 87, 90
- Position: Tight end

Personal information
- Born: August 31, 1958 (age 68); Galveston, Texas, U.S.
- Listed height: 6 ft 3 in (1.91 m)
- Listed weight: 228 lb (103 kg)

Career information
- High school: Los Alamos (NM)
- College: New Mexico
- NFL draft: 1980: undrafted

Career history
- Los Angeles Rams (1980–1981); Houston Oilers (1982–1983); Washington Redskins (1984); Kansas City Chiefs (1984–1987)

Career NFL statistics
- Receptions: 99
- Receiving yards: 1,053
- Touchdowns: 7
- Stats at Pro Football Reference

Walter Henslee Arnold (born August 31, 1958) is an American former professional football player who was a tight end in the National Football League (NFL) for the Los Angeles Rams, Houston Oilers, Washington Redskins, and the Kansas City Chiefs. He played college football for the New Mexico Lobos.
