= Eric Holle =

American football player (born 1960)

No. 93
- Positions: Nose tackle, defensive end

Personal information
- Born: September 5, 1960 (age 66); Houston, Texas, U.S.
- Listed height: 6 ft 5 in (1.96 m)
- Listed weight: 260 lb (118 kg)

Career information
- High school: Lyndon B. Johnson (Austin, Texas)
- College: Texas (1979–1983)
- NFL draft: 1984: 5th round, 117th overall pick

Career history
- Kansas City Chiefs (1984–1987); Houston Oilers (1989)*
- * Offseason or practice squad member only

Awards and highlights
- First-team All-SWC (1983)

Career NFL statistics
- Sacks: 2.5
- Fumble recoveries: 1
- Stats at Pro Football Reference

Eric Warner Holle (born September 5, 1960) is an American former professional football player who was a defensive lineman for four seasons with the Kansas City Chiefs of the National Football League (NFL). He was selected by the Chiefs in the fifth round of the 1984 NFL draft after playing college football for the Texas Longhorns.

== Early life ==
Eric Warner Holle was born on September 5, 1960, in Houston, Texas. He attended Lyndon B. Johnson High School in Austin, Texas and graduated in 1979. He was later inducted into the school's athletics hall of fame.

== College career ==
Holle was a member of the Texas Longhorns of the University of Texas at Austin from 1979 to 1983. He was on the freshman team in 1979 and the main roster from 1980 to 1983. In 1982, he suffered an open dislocation of his pinky finger during a game that caused the bone to visibly stick out. He was named first-team All-SWC by both the Associated Press and United Press International in 1983.

== Professional career ==
Holle was selected by the Kansas City Chiefs in the fifth round, with the 117th overall pick, of the 1984 NFL draft. He officially signed with the team on July 12. He played in all 16 games, starting one, for the Chiefs in 1984, recording 0.5 sacks and one fumble recovery. He appeared in 16 games, starting five, during the 1985 season, posting 0.5 sacks for the second straight year. Holle played in all 16 games for the third consecutive season in 1986 and made one sack. He also appeared in one playoff game that year. Holle played in eight games, starting one, for the Chiefs during the strike-shortened 1987 season, recording one sack. He was placed on injured reserve on December 5, 1987. He was placed on injured reserve again on August 22, 1988, and was waived off of injured reserve in early October 1988.

Holle signed with the Houston Oilers on May 15, 1989. He was released on August 29, 1989.
