= Ken Jolly =

American football player (born 1962)

No. 52
- Position: Linebacker

Personal information
- Born: February 28, 1962 (age 64); Dallas, Texas, U.S.

Career information
- College: MidAmerica Nazarene
- NFL draft: 1984: undrafted

Career history
- Kansas City Chiefs (1984–1985)

Career NFL statistics
- Games played: 32
- Stats at Pro Football Reference

Kenneth Clay Jolly (born February 28, 1962) is an American former professional football player who was a linebacker for the Kansas City Chiefs of the National Football League (NFL). He attended Park College, which did not have an intercollegiate football team, and then played college football for the MidAmerica Nazarene Pioneers.
