= Jeff Paine =

American football player (born 1961)

No. 95, 59, 36
- Position: Linebacker

Personal information
- Born: August 19, 1961 (age 65); Garland, Texas, U.S.
- Listed height: 6 ft 2 in (1.88 m)
- Listed weight: 224 lb (102 kg)

Career information
- High school: Richardson (Richardson, Texas)
- College: Texas A&M
- NFL draft: 1984: 5th round, 134th overall pick

Career history
- Kansas City Chiefs (1984–1985); Washington Redskins (1986); St. Louis Cardinals (1987)

Career NFL statistics
- Sacks: 1
- Stats at Pro Football Reference

Jeffrey Franklin Paine (born August 19, 1961) is an American former professional football player who was a linebacker in the National Football League (NFL) for the Kansas City Chiefs, St. Louis Cardinals, and Washington Redskins. He played college football for the Texas A&M Aggies and was selected in the fifth round of the 1984 NFL draft.
