= Dave Brazil (American football) =

American football coach (1936–2017)

David Lloyd Brazil
Biographical details
- Born: March 25, 1936
- Died: March 10, 2017 (aged 80)

Coaching career (HC unless noted)
- 1968: Holy Cross (DC/OC)
- 1969–1970: Tulsa (DB/LB)
- 1972–1974: Eastern Michigan (DC/OC)
- 1975: Detroit Wheels (DC)
- 1976: Chicago Winds (LB/DL)
- 1980: Boston College (DC)
- 1981–1982: Kent State (DC)
- 1984–1985: Kansas City Chiefs (DB)
- 1986–1988: Kansas City Chiefs (LB)
- 1989: Pittsburgh Steelers (LB)
- 1990–1991: Pittsburgh Steelers (DC)
- 1992–2003: New York Giants (LB/DQC)

David Lloyd Brazil (March 25, 1936 – March 10, 2017) was an American football coach who last served with the New York Giants under head coach Jim Fassel. He was the last defensive coordinator for Chuck Noll with the Pittsburgh Steelers from 1990 to 1991.

== Personal life ==
Brazil and his wife Bridget had six children, Kathleen, Mary Ann, Michael, Daniel, Thomas and Patrick.
