= Scott Auer =

American football player (born 1961)

No. 68
- Positions: Guard, tackle

Personal information
- Born: October 4, 1961 (age 65); Fort Wayne, Indiana, U.S.
- Died: August 11, 2023 (aged 61)
- Listed height: 6 ft 5 in (1.96 m)
- Listed weight: 255 lb (116 kg)

Career information
- High school: Elmhurst (Fort Wayne)
- College: Michigan State
- NFL draft: 1984: 9th round, 229th overall pick

Career history
- Kansas City Chiefs (1984–1985); San Francisco 49ers (1987)*
- * Offseason or practice squad member only

Career NFL statistics
- Games played: 23
- Games started: 6
- Stats at Pro Football Reference

Scott Eugene Auer (October 4, 1961 – August 11, 2023) was an American professional football player who was a guard and tackle for the Kansas City Chiefs of the National Football League (NFL) from 1984 to 1985. He played college football for the Michigan State Spartans.
