= Dave Lutz =

American football player (born 1959)

No. 72, 73
- Position: Offensive tackle

Personal information
- Born: December 30, 1959 (age 66); Polkton, North Carolina, U.S.
- Listed height: 6 ft 8 in (2.03 m)
- Listed weight: 305 lb (138 kg)

Career information
- High school: Anson (Wadesboro, North Carolina)
- College: Georgia Tech
- NFL draft: 1983: 2nd round, 34th overall pick

Career history
- Kansas City Chiefs (1983–1992); Detroit Lions (1993–1995)

Career NFL statistics
- Games played: 187
- Games started: 171
- Fumble recoveries: 4
- Stats at Pro Football Reference

David Graham Lutz (born December 30, 1959) is an American former professional football player who was an offensive lineman for 13 seasons in the National Football League (NFL), primarily for the Kansas City Chiefs. He played college football for the Georgia Tech Yellow Jackets and was a second-round draft pick (34th overall) by the Chiefs in the 1983 NFL draft.

He played in 187 games and started 171 games. He is married and has two daughters.
