= Calvin Daniels =

American football player (born 1958)

No. 50, 56
- Position: Linebacker

Personal information
- Born: December 26, 1958 (age 67); Morehead City, North Carolina, U.S.
- Listed height: 6 ft 3 in (1.91 m)
- Listed weight: 236 lb (107 kg)

Career information
- High school: Goldsboro (Goldsboro, North Carolina)
- College: North Carolina
- NFL draft: 1982: 2nd round, 46th overall pick

Career history
- Kansas City Chiefs (1982–1985); Washington Redskins (1986)

Career NFL statistics
- Interceptions: 3
- Sacks: 10
- Fumble recoveries: 5
- Stats at Pro Football Reference

Calvin Richard Daniels (born December 26, 1958) is an American former professional football player who was a linebacker in the National Football League (NFL) for the Kansas City Chiefs and Washington Redskins. He played college football for the North Carolina Tar Heels and was selected 46th overall in the second round of the 1982 NFL draft.
