= 1981 Kansas City Chiefs season =

NFL team season

- Owner: Lamar Hunt
- General manager: Jim Schaaf
- Head coach: Marv Levy
- Home stadium: Arrowhead Stadium

Results
- Record: 9–7
- Division place: 3rd AFC West
- Playoffs: Did not qualify
- All-Pros: 1: K Nick Lowery (2nd team)
- Pro Bowlers: 5: RB Joe Delaney; DE Art Still; CB Gary Green; S Gary Barbaro; K Nick Lowery

The 1981 Kansas City Chiefs season was the franchise's 12th season in the National Football League and 22nd overall. They improved from 1980 from an 8–8 record to a 9–7 record (their first winning season in 8 years) but missing the playoffs for the tenth consecutive season.

Bill Kenney began the 1981 season as the club's starting quarterback and directed the Chiefs to a 6–2 start, including a 37–33 win over the Pittsburgh Steelers at Three Rivers Stadium on Opening Day. 2nd round draft choice, running back Joe Delaney electrified the club's offense by rushing for 1,121 yards, a team single-season record at the time. He was named the AFC's Rookie of the Year and became the first running back to represent the franchise in the Pro Bowl. Delaney registered a 193-yard performance in a 23–10 victory against the Oilers on November 15, the best single-game total ever amassed by a Kansas City rookie.

Owning an 8–4 record with four games remaining, the Chiefs were poised to make the playoffs for the first time in 10 years before hitting a three-game losing skid. Bill Kenney missed the club's final three contests due to injury as Steve Fuller temporarily reclaimed the starting quarterback position and guided the club to a 10–6 win at Minnesota, in the final contest played at Metropolitan Stadium. With the Chiefs winning the game, Vikings fans began dismembering the stadium as early as the second half—taking seats, pieces of the scoreboard and even chunks of sod as souvenirs. The victory assured the Chiefs of a 9–7 record, the club's first winning mark since 1973 as coach Marv Levy increased the club's victory total for a third consecutive year. Inspired by the Washington Redskins's "Hail to the Redskins," Levy penned a fight song for the Chiefs called "Give a Cheer for Kansas City" which never caught on.

== Offseason ==
=== NFL draft ===
1981 Kansas City Chiefs draft
Round	Pick	Player	Position	College	Notes
1	14	Willie Scott	Tight end	South Carolina	
2	41	Joe Delaney *	Running back	Northwestern State	
3	70	Marvin Harvey	Tight end	Southern Mississippi	
3	75	Roger Taylor	Offensive tackle	Oklahoma State	
3	78	Lloyd Burruss *	Defensive back	Maryland	
4	97	Ron Washington	Wide receiver	Arizona State	
5	124	Todd Thomas	Center	North Dakota	
6	153	Dock Luckie	Defensive tackle	Florida	
7	180	Billy Jackson	Running back	Alabama	
8	206	David Dorn	Wide receiver	Rutgers	
9	237	Anthony Vereen	Defensive back	Southeastern Louisiana	
10	262	Les Studdard	Center	Texas	
11	289	Frank Case	Defensive end	Penn State	
12	319	Bob Gagliano	Quarterback	Utah State	
Made roster * Made at least one Pro Bowl during career

=== Undrafted free agents ===
1981 undrafted free agents of note
Player	Position	College
Ed Baxley	Linebacker	South Carolina

== Personnel ==
=== Staff ===
1981 Kansas City Chiefs staff
Front office: Founder – Lamar Hunt; President – Jack Steadman; Vice President and General Manager – Jim Schaaf; Director of Player Personnel – Les Miller; Assistant Director of Player Personnel – J. D. Helm; Head coaches: Head Coach – Marv Levy; Offensive coaches: Quarterbacks and Receivers – Kay Dalton; Offensive Backs – Bobby Ross; Tight Ends – Frank Gansz; Offensive Line – Tom Bresnahan	Defensive coaches: Defensive Coordinator – Rod Rust; Defensive Line – Don Lawrence; Linebackers – Ted Cottrell; Defensive Backs – Walt Corey; Special teams coaches: Kicking Teams – Frank Gansz; Strength and conditioning: Strength and Conditioning – Rick Abernethy

=== Roster ===
1981 Kansas City Chiefs roster
Quarterbacks (QB): 4 Steve Fuller; 11 Bob Gagliano; 9 Bill Kenney; Running backs (RB): 30 Curtis Bledsoe; 37 Joe Delaney; 21 Clark Gaines; 48 James Hadnot; 43 Billy Jackson; Wide receivers (WR): 88 Carlos Carson; 80 James Murphy; 87 Stan Rome; 86 J. T. Smith; Tight ends (TE): 85 Ed Beckman; 84 Al Dixon; 81 Willie Scott	Offensive linemen (OL): 66 Brad Budde G; 65 Tom Condon G; 77 Charlie Getty T; 60 Matt Herkenhoff T; 63 John Olenchalk C; 70 Jim Rourke G/T; 58 Jack Rudnay C; 76 Roger Taylor T; Defensive linemen (DL): 99 Mike Bell DE; 91 Ken Kremer NT; 71 Dave Lindstrom DE; 74 Dino Mangiero NT; 61 Don Parrish NT; 67 Art Still DE	Linebackers (LB): 56 Phil Cancik ILB; 51 Charles Jackson OLB; 55 Dave Klug OLB; 53 Whitney Paul OLB; 50 Cal Peterson OLB; 59 Gary Spani ILB; Defensive backs (DB): 26 Gary Barbaro FS; 34 Lloyd Burruss SS; 42 M. L. Carter CB; 20 Deron Cherry FS; 41 Herb Christopher SS; 24 Gary Green CB; 44 Eric Harris CB; 31 Will Lewis CB; Special teams (ST): 7 Jeff Gossett P; 8 Nick Lowery K	Reserve: 35 Horace Belton RB (IR); -- James Black DE (IR); 57 Jerry Blanton LB (IR); 95 Frank Case DE (IR); -- David Cunningham RB (IR); -- Jeff Davis TE (IR); 1 Bob Grupp P (IR); 83 Marvin Harvey TE (IR); 75 Sylvester Hicks DE (IR); 52 Thomas Howard LB (IR); -- Lance Madison WR (IR); 54 Frank Manumaleuga LB (IR); 22 Ted McKnight RB (IR); 89 Henry Marshall WR (IR); 73 Bob Simmons G (IR); -- Les Studdard G (IR); -- George Stewart G (IR); 62 Todd Thomas C (IR); -- Ron Washington WR (IR); 40 Mike Williams RB (IR); Rookies in italics Source

== Preseason ==
Week	Date	Opponent	Result	Record	Venue	Attendance	Recap
1	August 7	at Washington Redskins	L 10–16	0–1	RFK Stadium	32,488	Recap
2	August 15	Chicago Bears	W 13–0	1–1	Arrowhead Stadium	41,099	Recap
3	August 22	St. Louis Cardinals	L 3–16	1–2	Arrowhead Stadium	42,550	Recap
4	August 28	at Miami Dolphins	L 7–31	1–3	Miami Orange Bowl	41,290	Recap

== Regular season ==
=== Schedule ===
Week	Date	Opponent	Result	Record	Venue	Attendance	Recap
1	September 6	at Pittsburgh Steelers	**W** 37–33	1–0	Three Rivers Stadium	53,305	Recap
2	September 13	Tampa Bay Buccaneers	**W** 19–10	2–0	Arrowhead Stadium	50,555	Recap
3	September 20	**San Diego Chargers**	**L** 31–42	2–1	Arrowhead Stadium	63,866	Recap
4	September 27	at **Seattle Seahawks**	**W** 20–14	3–1	Kingdome	59,255	Recap
5	October 4	at New England Patriots	**L** 17–33	3–2	Schaefer Stadium	55,931	Recap
6	October 11	**Oakland Raiders**	**W** 27–0	4–2	Arrowhead Stadium	76,543	Recap
7	October 18	**Denver Broncos**	**W** 28–14	5–2	Arrowhead Stadium	74,672	Recap
8	October 25	at **Oakland Raiders**	**W** 28–17	6–2	Oakland–Alameda County Coliseum	42,914	Recap
9	November 1	at **San Diego Chargers**	**L** 20–22	6–3	Jack Murphy Stadium	51,307	Recap
10	November 8	Chicago Bears	**L** 13–16 (OT)	6–4	Arrowhead Stadium	60,605	Recap
11	November 15	Houston Oilers	**W** 23–10	7–4	Arrowhead Stadium	73,984	Recap
12	November 22	**Seattle Seahawks**	**W** 40–13	8–4	Arrowhead Stadium	49,002	Recap
13	November 26	at Detroit Lions	**L** 10–27	8–5	Pontiac Silverdome	76,735	Recap
14	December 6	at **Denver Broncos**	**L** 13–16	8–6	Mile High Stadium	74,744	Recap
15	December 13	Miami Dolphins	**L** 7–17	8–7	Arrowhead Stadium	57,407	Recap
16	December 20	at Minnesota Vikings	**W** 10–6	9–7	Metropolitan Stadium	41,110	Recap
Note: Intra-division opponents are in **bold** text.

=== Game summaries ===
==== Week 1: at Pittsburgh Steelers ====
Week 1: Kansas City Chiefs at Pittsburgh Steelers – Game summary

Quarter	1	2	3	4	Total
**Chiefs**	10	3	10	14	**37**
Steelers	6	13	7	7	**33**

at Three Rivers Stadium, Pittsburgh, Pennsylvania

- Date: September 6
- Game time: 1:00 p.m. EDT
- Game weather: Cloudy, 69 °F (21 °C)
- Game attendance: 53,305
- Referee: Jim Tunney
- TV announcers (NBC): Bob Costas and Bob Trumpy
- Recap, Game Book

Game information

**First quarter**

- PIT – Lynn Swann 18-yard pass from Terry Bradshaw (kick failed, wide right), 6:11. Steelers 6–0. **Drive: 6 plays, 47 yards, 0:31.**
- KC – Henry Marshall 48-yard pass from Bill Kenney (Nick Lowery kick), 2:14. Chiefs 7–6. **Drive: 8 plays, 80 yards, 3:57.**
- KC – Nick Lowery 35-yard field goal, 0:08. Chiefs 10–6. **Drive: 4 plays, –2 yards, 0:54.**

**Second quarter**

- PIT – Franco Harris 7-yard run (kick failed, wide right), 5:32. Steelers 12–10. **Drive: 6 plays, 38 yards, 2:50.**
- PIT – Franco Harris 1-yard run (David Trout kick), 1:10. Steelers 19–10. **Drive: 5 plays, 48 yards, 0:54.**
- KC – Nick Lowery 40-yard field goal, 0:00. Steelers 19–13. **Drive: 5 plays, 47 yards, 1:10.**

**Third quarter**

- KC – Carlos Carson 53-yard pass from Bill Kenney (Nick Lowery kick), 13:13. Chiefs 20–19. **Drive: 6 plays, 80 yards, 1:47.**
- PIT – Greg Hawthorne 1-yard run (David Trout kick), 9:27. Steelers 26–20. **Drive: 7 plays, 57 yards, 3:46.**
- KC – Nick Lowery 42-yard field goal, 3:21. Steelers 26–23. **Drive: 3 plays, 8 yards, 1:36.**

**Fourth quarter**

- KC – Ted McKnight 3-yard run (Nick Lowery kick), 14:07. Chiefs 30–26. **Drive: 7 plays, 38 yards, 3:24.**
- PIT – Jim Smith 41-yard pass from Terry Bradshaw (David Trout kick), 7:12. Steelers 33–30. **Drive: 4 plays, 74 yards, 2:02.**
- KC – Tom Howard 65-yard fumble return (Nick Lowery kick), 1:59. Chiefs 37–33.

**Top passers**

- KC – Bill Kenney – 14/26, 242 yards, 2 TD, INT
- PIT – Terry Bradshaw – 21/36, 319 yards, 2 TD, 2 INT

**Top rushers**

- KC – Ted McKnight – 17 rushes, 59 yards, TD
- PIT – Franco Harris – 19 rushes, 70 yards, 2 TD

**Top receivers**

- KC – Henry Marshall – 4 receptions, 89 yards, TD
- PIT – John Stallworth – 6 receptions, 107 yards

==== Week 2: vs. Tampa Bay Buccaneers ====
Week 2: Tampa Bay Buccaneers at Kansas City Chiefs – Game summary

Quarter	1	2	3	4	Total
Buccaneers	7	3	0	0	**10**
**Chiefs**	7	3	3	6	**19**

at Arrowhead Stadium, Kansas City, Missouri

- Date: September 13
- Game time: 12:00 p.m. CDT
- Game weather: Clear, 82 °F (28 °C)
- Game attendance: 50,555
- Referee: Fred Wyant
- TV announcers (CBS): Dick Stockton and Jim Hill
- Recap, Game Book

Game information

**First quarter**

- KC – Ted McKnight 8-yard run (Nick Lowery kick), 12:43. Chiefs 7–0. **Drive: 2 plays, 14 yards, 0:43.**
- TB – James Wilder 2-yard run (Garo Yepremian kick), 2:08. Tied 7–7. **Drive: 6 plays, 59 yards, 2:57.**

**Second quarter**

- TB – Garo Yepremian 44-yard field goal, 13:09. Buccaneers 10–7. **Drive: 6 plays, 34 yards, 2:53.**
- KC – Nick Lowery 20-yard field goal, 5:30. Tied 10–10. **Drive: 5 plays, 19 yards, 3:29.**

**Third quarter**

- KC – Nick Lowery 20-yard field goal, 7:06. Chiefs 13–10. **Drive: 14 plays, 74 yards, 7:54.**

**Fourth quarter**

- KC – Nick Lowery 42-yard field goal, 9:52. Chiefs 16–10. **Drive: 11 plays, 47 yards, 6:30.**
- KC – Nick Lowery 41-yard field goal, 2:00. Chiefs 19–10. **Drive: 7 plays, 34 yards, 3:45.**

**Top passers**

- TB – Doug Williams – 20/43, 294 yards
- KC – Bill Kenney – 12/25, 99 yards

**Top rushers**

- TB – Ricky Bell – 8 rushes, 9 yards
- KC – Joe Delaney – 13 rushes, 57 yards

**Top receivers**

- TB – Kevin House – 5 receptions, 87 yards
- KC – Carlos Carson – 2 receptions, 35 yards

==== Week 3: vs. San Diego Chargers ====
Week 3: San Diego Chargers at Kansas City Chiefs – Game summary

Quarter	1	2	3	4	Total
**Chargers**	14	14	7	7	**42**
Chiefs	7	7	14	3	**31**

at Arrowhead Stadium, Kansas City, Missouri

- Date: September 20
- Game time: 1:00 p.m. CDT
- Game weather: Clear, 80 °F (27 °C)
- Game attendance: 63,866
- Referee: Ben Dreith
- TV announcers (NBC): Mike Adamle and Rocky Bleier
- Recap, Game Book

Game information

**First quarter**

- KC – Ted McKnight 1-yard run (Nick Lowery kick), 9:12. Chiefs 7–0. **Drive: 10 plays, 44 yards, 5:48.**
- SD – Kellen Winslow 13-yard pass from Dan Fouts (Rolf Benirschke kick), 4:13. Tied 7–7. **Drive: 8 plays, 64 yards, 2:58.**
- SD – James Brooks 29-yard pass from Dan Fouts (Rolf Benirschke kick), 0:33. Chargers 14–7. **Drive: 4 plays, 47 yards, 1:36.**

**Second quarter**

- SD – Chuck Muncie 1-yard run (Rolf Benirschke kick), 6:14. Chargers 21–7. **Drive: 8 plays, 84 yards, 4:51.**
- SD – Eric Sievers 12-yard pass from Dan Fouts (Rolf Benirschke kick), 2:09. Chargers 28–7. **Drive: 1 play, 12 yards, 0:05.**
- KC – Al Dixon 7-yard pass from Bill Kenney (Nick Lowery kick), 1:19. Chargers 28–14. **Drive: 5 plays, 76 yards, 0:50.**

**Third quarter**

- KC – Ted McKnight 3-yard run (Nick Lowery kick), 10:38. Chargers 28–21. **Drive: 8 plays, 37 yards, 3:55.**
- SD – Chuck Muncie 3-yard run (Rolf Benirschke kick), 7:42. Chargers 35–21. **Drive: 6 plays, 65 yards, 2:56.**
- KC – Billy Jackson 4-yard run (Nick Lowery kick), 3:25. Chargers 35–28. **Drive: 9 plays, 80 yards, 4:17.**

**Fourth quarter**

- KC – Nick Lowery 37-yard field goal, 10:07. Chargers 35–31. **Drive: 7 plays, 27 yards, 3:43.**
- SD – Gary Johnson 5-yard interception return (Rolf Benirschke kick), 1:53. Chargers 42–31.

**Top passers**

- SD – Dan Fouts – 22/43, 284 yards, 3 TD, 3 INT
- KC – Bill Kenney – 22/41, 303 yards, TD, 5 INT

**Top rushers**

- SD – Chuck Muncie – 17 rushes, 93 yards, 2 TD
- KC – Joe Delaney – 9 rushes, 66 yards

**Top receivers**

- SD – Kellen Winslow – 6 receptions, 96 yards, TD
- KC – J. T. Smith – 9 receptions, 140 yards

==== Week 4: at Seattle Seahawks ====
Week 4: Kansas City Chiefs at Seattle Seahawks – Game summary

Quarter	1	2	3	4	Total
**Chiefs**	7	13	0	0	**20**
Seahawks	0	7	7	0	**14**

at Kingdome, Seattle, Washington

- Date: September 27
- Game time: 1:00 p.m. PDT
- Game weather: None (indoor stadium)
- Game attendance: 59,255
- Referee: Tom Dooley
- TV announcers (NBC): Phil Stone and Gene Washington
- Recap, Game Book

Game information

**First quarter**

- KC – Ted McKnight 2-yard run (Nick Lowery kick), 9:56. Chiefs 7–0. **Drive: 10 plays, 67 yards, 5:04.**

**Second quarter**

- KC – Bill Kenney 1-yard run (Nick Lowery kick), 13:41. Chiefs 14–0. **Drive: 12 plays, 50 yards, 6:17.**
- KC – Nick Lowery 30-yard field goal, 6:40. Chiefs 17–0. **Drive: 10 plays, 67 yards, 5:01.**
- KC – Nick Lowery 38-yard field goal, 5:28. Chiefs 20–0. **Drive: 4 plays, –5 yards, 0:59.**
- SEA – Sam McCullum 11-yard pass from Jim Zorn (Efrén Herrera kick), 1:58. Chiefs 20–7. **Drive: 9 plays, 83 yards, 3:30.**

**Third quarter**

- SEA – Sherman Smith 2-yard run (Efrén Herrera kick), 11:01. Chiefs 20–14. **Drive: 8 plays, 51 yards, 3:50.**

**Fourth quarter**

- No scoring plays.

**Top passers**

- KC – Bill Kenney – 16/25, 239 yards
- SEA – Jim Zorn – 31/47, 308 yards, TD

**Top rushers**

- KC – Joe Delaney – 15 rushes, 45 yards
- SEA – Jim Zorn – 4 rushes, 48 yards

**Top receivers**

- KC – J. T. Smith – 5 receptions, 81 yards
- SEA – David Hughes – 12 receptions, 103 yards

==== Week 5: at New England Patriots ====
Week 5: Kansas City Chiefs at New England Patriots – Game summary

Quarter	1	2	3	4	Total
Chiefs	7	0	3	7	**17**
**Patriots**	7	7	10	9	**33**

at Schaefer Stadium, Foxborough, Massachusetts

- Date: October 4
- Game time: 1:00 p.m. EDT
- Game weather: Partly cloudy, cool, 57 °F (14 °C)
- Game attendance: 55,931
- Referee: Fred Silva
- TV announcers (NBC): Don Criqui and John Brodie
- Recap, Game Book

Game information

**First quarter**

- NE – Don Hasselbeck 13-yard pass from Matt Cavanaugh (John Smith kick), 9:09. Patriots 7–0. **Drive: 9 plays, 45 yards, 4:52.**
- KC – James Hadnot 1-yard run (Nick Lowery kick), 3:27. Tied 7–7. **Drive: 11 plays, 70 yards, 5:42.**

**Second quarter**

- NE – Matt Cavanaugh 8-yard run (John Smith kick), 6:48. Patriots 14–7. **Drive: 4 plays, 17 yards, 2:12.**

**Third quarter**

- KC – Nick Lowery 35-yard field goal, 11:36. Patriots 14–10. **Drive: 4 plays, 6 yards, 1:31.**
- NE – John Smith 50-yard field goal, 6:57. Patriots 17–10. **Drive: 9 plays, 45 yards, 4:39.**
- NE – Tony Collins 13-yard run (John Smith kick), 3:59. Patriots 24–10. **Drive: 5 plays, 71 yards, 1:52.**

**Fourth quarter**

- KC – Joe Delaney 18-yard run (Nick Lowery kick), 14:54. Patriots 24–17. **Drive: 9 plays, 66 yards, 4:05.**
- NE – Stanley Morgan 66-yard pass from Andy Johnson (kick failed, wide right), 13:07. Patriots 30–17. **Drive: 4 plays, 77 yards, 1:47.**
- NE – John Smith 43-yard field goal, 7:36. Patriots 33–17. **Drive: 6 plays, 39 yards, 3:17.**

**Top passers**

- KC – Bill Kenney – 9/20, 108 yards, 3 INT
- NE – Matt Cavanaugh – 10/19, 162 yards, TD, 2 INT

**Top rushers**

- KC – Joe Delaney – 18 rushes, 101 yards, TD
- NE – Tony Collins – 19 rushes, 96 yards, TD

**Top receivers**

- KC – Willie Scott – 3 receptions, 44 yards
- NE – Stanley Morgan – 4 receptions, 118 yards, TD

==== Week 6: vs. Oakland Raiders ====
Week 6: Oakland Raiders at Kansas City Chiefs – Game summary

Quarter	1	2	3	4	Total
Raiders	0	0	0	0	**0**
**Chiefs**	3	7	10	7	**27**

at Arrowhead Stadium, Kansas City, Missouri

- Date: October 11
- Game time: 1:00 p.m. CDT
- Game weather: Clear, 69 °F (21 °C)
- Game attendance: 76,543
- Referee: Red Cashion
- TV announcers (NBC): Phil Stone and Gene Washington
- Recap, Game Book

Game information

**First quarter**

- KC – Nick Lowery 52-yard field goal, 8:39. Chiefs 3–0. **Drive: 9 plays, 42 yards, 3:33.**

**Second quarter**

- KC – Billy Jackson 4-yard run (Nick Lowery kick), 6:28. Chiefs 10–0. **Drive: 6 plays, 86 yards, 3:15.**

**Third quarter**

- KC – Nick Lowery 25-yard field goal, 8:51. Chiefs 13–0. **Drive: 11 plays, 80 yards, 6:09.**
- KC – Henry Marshall 48-yard pass from Bill Kenney (Nick Lowery kick), 2:37. Chiefs 20–0. **Drive: 9 plays, 64 yards, 3:33.**

**Fourth quarter**

- KC – J. T. Smith 9-yard pass from Bill Kenney (Nick Lowery kick), 10:18. Chiefs 27–0. **Drive: 8 plays, 75 yards, 4:27.**

**Top passers**

- OAK – Jim Plunkett – 12/29, 129 yards, INT
- KC – Bill Kenney – 16/23, 187 yards, 2 TD

**Top rushers**

- OAK – Kenny King – 11 rushes, 46 yards
- KC – Joe Delaney – 28 rushes, 106 yards

**Top receivers**

- OAK – Cliff Branch – 4 receptions, 46 yards
- KC – Henry Marshall – 6 receptions, 110 yards, TD

==== Week 7: vs. Denver Broncos ====
Week 7: Denver Broncos at Kansas City Chiefs – Game summary

Quarter	1	2	3	4	Total
Broncos	0	0	7	7	**14**
**Chiefs**	14	0	0	14	**28**

at Arrowhead Stadium, Kansas City, Missouri

- Date: October 18
- Game time: 3:00 p.m. CDT
- Game weather: Clear, 55 °F (13 °C)
- Game attendance: 74,672
- Referee: Dick Jorgensen
- TV announcers (NBC): Bob Costas and Bob Trumpy
- Recap, Game Book

Game information

**First quarter**

- KC – Billy Jackson 1-yard run (Nick Lowery kick), 8:37. Chiefs 7–0. **Drive: 9 plays, 52 yards, 4:45.**
- KC – Whitney Paul 47-yard fumble return (Nick Lowery kick), 0:22. Chiefs 14–0.

**Second quarter**

- No scoring plays.

**Third quarter**

- DEN – Steve Watson 11-yard pass from Craig Morton (Fred Steinfort kick), 4:56. Chiefs 14–7. **Drive: 5 plays, 75 yards, 2:35.**

**Fourth quarter**

- KC – Henry Marshall 64-yard pass from Bill Kenney (Nick Lowery kick), 14:08. Chiefs 21–7. **Drive: 3 plays, 70 yards, 0:52.**
- DEN – Steve Watson 1-yard pass from Craig Morton (Fred Steinfort kick), 8:59. Chiefs 21–14. **Drive: 12 plays, 82 yards, 5:09.**
- KC – Joe Delaney 82-yard run (Nick Lowery kick), 5:27. Chiefs 28–14. **Drive: 2 plays, 80 yards, 0:41.**

**Top passers**

- DEN – Craig Morton – 25/38, 342 yards, 2 TD, INT
- KC – Bill Kenney – 6/12, 100 yards, TD, 2 INT

**Top rushers**

- DEN – Dave Preston – 13 rushes, 39 yards
- KC – Joe Delaney – 21 rushes, 149 yards, TD

**Top receivers**

- DEN – Rick Upchurch – 5 receptions, 138 yards
- KC – Henry Marshall – 3 receptions, 80 yards, TD

==== Week 8: at Oakland Raiders ====
Week 8: Kansas City Chiefs at Oakland Raiders – Game summary

Quarter	1	2	3	4	Total
**Chiefs**	0	0	7	21	**28**
Raiders	7	10	0	0	**17**

at Oakland–Alameda County Coliseum, Oakland, California

- Date: October 25
- Game time: 1:00 p.m. PST
- Game weather: Partly cloudy, 61 °F (16 °C)
- Game attendance: 42,914
- Referee: Bob Frederic
- TV announcers (NBC): Merle Harmon and George Kunz
- Recap, Game Book

Game information

**First quarter**

- OAK – Morris Bradshaw 6-yard pass from Marc Wilson (Chris Bahr kick), 12:34. Raiders 7–0. **Drive: 1 play, 6 yards, 0:04.**

**Second quarter**

- OAK – Marc Wilson 3-yard run (Chris Bahr kick), 11:09. Raiders 14–0. **Drive: 6 plays, 68 yards, 2:32.**
- OAK – Chris Bahr 51-yard field goal, 0:00. Raiders 17–0. **Drive: 6 plays, 18 yards, 1:15.**

**Third quarter**

- KC – Billy Jackson 29-yard run (Nick Lowery kick), 0:29. Raiders 17–7. **Drive: 6 plays, 72 yards, 2:16.**

**Fourth quarter**

- KC – Billy Jackson 3-yard run (Nick Lowery kick), 7:20. Raiders 17–14. **Drive: 9 plays, 59 yards, 4:19.**
- KC – Billy Jackson 3-yard run (Nick Lowery kick), 1:57. Chiefs 21–17. **Drive: 11 plays, 82 yards, 4:22.**
- KC – Gary Spani 91-yard fumble return (Nick Lowery kick), 0:24. Chiefs 28–17.

**Top passers**

- KC – Bill Kenney – 8/25, 132 yards, 3 INT
- OAK – Marc Wilson – 19/47, 251 yards, TD, 4 INT

**Top rushers**

- KC – Steve Fuller – 3 rushes, 43 yards
- OAK – Kenny King – 11 rushes, 49 yards

**Top receivers**

- KC – Henry Marshall – 5 receptions, 85 yards
- OAK – Cliff Branch – 4 receptions, 86 yards

==== Week 9: at San Diego Chargers ====
Week 9: Kansas City Chiefs at San Diego Chargers – Game summary

Quarter	1	2	3	4	Total
Chiefs	7	0	7	6	**20**
**Chargers**	7	12	0	3	**22**

at Jack Murphy Stadium, San Diego, California

- Date: November 1
- Game time: 1:00 p.m. PST
- Game weather: Clear and sunny, 81 °F (27 °C)
- Game attendance: 51,307
- Referee: Gene Barth
- TV announcers (NBC): Phil Stone and Gene Washington
- Recap, Game Book

Game information

**First quarter**

- SD – Chuck Muncie 1-yard run (Rolf Benirschke kick), 10:19. Chargers 7–0. **Drive: 7 plays, 50 yards, 2:34.**
- KC – James Hadnot 2-yard run (Nick Lowery kick), 3:36. Tied 7–7. **Drive: 11 plays, 72 yards, 6:43.**

**Second quarter**

- SD – Chuck Muncie 4-yard run (kick failed, wide right), 4:10. Chargers 13–7. **Drive: 5 plays, 71 yards, 2:32.**
- SD – Rolf Benirschke 29-yard field goal, 0:30. Chargers 16–7. **Drive: 9 plays, 56 yards, 1:26.**
- SD – Rolf Benirschke 19-yard field goal, 0:00. Chargers 19–7. **Drive: 2 plays, 32 yards, 0:19.**

**Third quarter**

- KC – Billy Jackson 2-yard pass from Bill Kenney (Nick Lowery kick), 11:55. Chargers 19–14. **Drive: 4 plays, 56 yards, 1:39.**

**Fourth quarter**

- KC – Nick Lowery 21-yard field goal, 14:50. Chargers 19–17. **Drive: 13 plays, 78 yards, 7:15.**
- KC – Nick Lowery 32-yard field goal, 6:32. Chiefs 20–19. **Drive: 10 plays, 49 yards, 6:25.**
- SD – Rolf Benirschke 22-yard field goal, 0:13. Chargers 22–20. **Drive: 14 plays, 70 yards, 6:04.**

**Top passers**

- KC – Bill Kenney – 13/22, 190 yards, TD
- SD – Dan Fouts – 24/39, 297 yards, INT

**Top rushers**

- KC – Joe Delaney – 23 rushes, 117 yards
- SD – Chuck Muncie – 16 rushes, 63 yards, 2 TD

**Top receivers**

- KC – J. T. Smith – 5 receptions, 92 yards
- SD – Chuck Muncie – 6 receptions, 71 yards

==== Week 10: vs. Chicago Bears ====
Week 10: Chicago Bears at Kansas City Chiefs – Game summary

Quarter	1	2	3	4	OT	Total
**Bears**	7	3	0	3	3	**16**
Chiefs	3	3	0	7	0	**13**

at Arrowhead Stadium, Kansas City, Missouri

- Date: November 8
- Game time: 1:00 p.m. CST
- Game weather: Showers, 56 °F (13 °C)
- Game attendance: 60,605
- Referee: Jim Tunney
- TV announcers (CBS): Dick Stockton and Johnny Morris
- Recap, Game Book

Game information

**First quarter**

- CHI – Rickey Watts 12-yard pass from Vince Evans (John Roveto kick), 13:43. Bears 7–0. **Drive: 3 plays, 7 yards, 0:12.**
- KC – Nick Lowery 34-yard field goal, 8:28. Bears 7–3. **Drive: 10 plays, 60 yards, 5:15.**

**Second quarter**

- CHI – John Roveto 24-yard field goal, 7:06. Bears 10–3. **Drive: 5 plays, 8 yards, 3:21.**
- KC – Nick Lowery 33-yard field goal, 0:00. Bears 10–6. **Drive: 3 plays, 8 yards, 0:33.**

**Third quarter**

- No scoring plays.

**Fourth quarter**

- CHI – John Roveto 23-yard field goal, 12:47. Bears 13–6. **Drive: 15 plays, 67 yards, 8:02.**
- KC – Henry Marshall 1-yard pass from Steve Fuller (Nick Lowery kick), 0:44. Tied 13–13. **Drive: 10 plays, 55 yards, 1:30.**

**Overtime**

- CHI – John Roveto 22-yard field goal, 1:53. Bears 16–13. **Drive: 12 plays, 59 yards, 5:30.**

**Top passers**

- CHI – Vince Evans – 7/30, 77 yards, TD
- KC – Steve Fuller – 7/20, 88 yards, TD, INT

**Top rushers**

- CHI – Walter Payton – 21 rushes, 70 yards
- KC – Billy Jackson – 14 rushes, 56 yards

**Top receivers**

- CHI – Ken Margerum – 4 receptions, 48 yards
- KC – Henry Marshall – 4 receptions, 48 yards, TD

==== Week 11: vs. Houston Oilers ====
Week 11: Houston Oilers at Kansas City Chiefs – Game summary

Quarter	1	2	3	4	Total
Oilers	0	3	0	7	**10**
**Chiefs**	7	3	7	6	**23**

at Arrowhead Stadium, Kansas City, Missouri

- Date: November 15
- Game time: 1:00 p.m. CST
- Game weather: Clear, 61 °F (16 °C)
- Game attendance: 73,984
- Referee: Jerry Markbreit
- TV announcers (NBC): Charlie Jones and Len Dawson
- Recap, Game Book

Game information

**First quarter**

- KC – Joe Delaney 6-yard run (Nick Lowery kick), 1:55. Chiefs 7–0. **Drive: 4 plays, 38 yards, 2:11.**

**Second quarter**

- KC – Nick Lowery 37-yard field goal, 11:04. Chiefs 10–0. **Drive: 7 plays, 14 yards, 3:14.**
- HOU – Toni Fritsch 21-yard field goal, 0:02. Chiefs 10–3. **Drive: 11 plays, 69 yards, 3:13.**

**Third quarter**

- KC – Billy Jackson 1-yard run (Nick Lowery kick), 7:26. Chiefs 17–3. **Drive: 7 plays, 46 yards, 3:06.**

**Fourth quarter**

- HOU – Ken Burrough 50-yard pass from Ken Stabler (Toni Fritsch kick), 9:36. Chiefs 17–10. **Drive: 2 plays, 60 yards, 0:39.**
- KC – Nick Lowery 42-yard field goal, 5:13. Chiefs 20–10. **Drive: 6 plays, 50 yards, 4:23.**
- KC – Nick Lowery 38-yard field goal, 1:56. Chiefs 23–10. **Drive: 5 plays, 14 yards, 2:58.**

**Top passers**

- HOU – Ken Stabler – 12/22, 194 yards, TD, 2 INT
- KC – Bill Kenney – 6/11, 39 yards

**Top rushers**

- HOU – Earl Campbell – 21 rushes, 99 yards
- KC – Joe Delaney – 29 rushes, 193 yards, TD

**Top receivers**

- HOU – Ken Burrough – 4 receptions, 80 yards, TD
- KC – J. T. Smith – 1 reception, 9 yards

==== Week 12: vs. Seattle Seahawks ====
Week 12: Seattle Seahawks at Kansas City Chiefs – Game summary

Quarter	1	2	3	4	Total
Seahawks	3	3	7	0	**13**
**Chiefs**	3	17	7	13	**40**

at Arrowhead Stadium, Kansas City, Missouri

- Date: November 22
- Game time: 1:00 p.m. CST
- Game weather: Clear, 53 °F (12 °C)
- Game attendance: 49,002
- Referee: Fred Silva
- TV announcers (NBC): Mike Adamle and Dave Rowe
- Recap, Game Book

Game information

**First quarter**

- SEA – Efrén Herrera 26-yard field goal, 7:57. Seahawks 3–0. **Drive: 12 plays, 76 yards, 7:03.**
- KC – Nick Lowery 37-yard field goal, 2:46. Tied 3–3. **Drive: 9 plays, 54 yards, 5:11.**

**Second quarter**

- KC – Nick Lowery 24-yard field goal, 11:16. Chiefs 6–3. **Drive: 9 plays, 62 yards, 3:44.**
- SEA – Efrén Herrera 30-yard field goal, 2:51. Tied 6–6. **Drive: 15 plays, 74 yards, 8:25.**
- KC – J.T. Smith 14-yard pass from Bill Kenney (Nick Lowery kick), 1:07. Chiefs 13–6. **Drive: 8 plays, 73 yards, 1:44.**
- KC – Lloyd Burruss 46-yard interception return (Nick Lowery kick), 0:31. Chiefs 20–6.

**Third quarter**

- KC – Billy Jackson 1-yard run (Nick Lowery kick), 9:40. Chiefs 27–6. **Drive: 10 plays, 75 yards, 5:20.**
- SEA – Steve Largent 30-yard pass from Jim Zorn (Efrén Herrera kick), 5:16. Chiefs 27–13. **Drive: 9 plays, 76 yards, 4:24.**

**Fourth quarter**

- KC – Willie Scott 2-yard pass from Bill Kenney (kick failed, wide right), 14:57. Chiefs 33–13. **Drive: 9 plays, 70 yards, 5:19.**
- KC – Billy Jackson 1-yard run (Nick Lowery kick), 9:36. Chiefs 40–13. **Drive: 9 plays, 56 yards, 4:18.**

**Top passers**

- SEA – Jim Zorn – 19/30, 258 yards, TD, INT
- KC – Bill Kenney – 17/22, 181 yards, 2 TD

**Top rushers**

- SEA – Theotis Brown – 16 rushes, 63 yards
- KC – James Hadnot – 10 rushes, 106 yards

**Top receivers**

- SEA – Steve Largent – 4 receptions, 63 yards, TD
- KC – J. T. Smith – 7 receptions, 70 yards, TD

==== Week 13: at Detroit Lions ====
Thanksgiving Day games

Week 13: Kansas City Chiefs at Detroit Lions – Game summary

Quarter	1	2	3	4	Total
Chiefs	7	0	3	0	**10**
**Lions**	7	10	3	7	**27**

at Pontiac Silverdome, Pontiac, Michigan

- Date: November 26
- Game time: 12:30 p.m. EST
- Game weather: None (indoor stadium)
- Game attendance: 76,735
- Referee: Fred Wyant
- TV announcers (NBC): Dick Enberg and Merlin Olsen
- Recap, Game Book

Game information

**First quarter**

- DET – David Hill 10-yard pass from Eric Hipple (Eddie Murray kick), 11:51. Lions 7–0. **Drive: 6 plays, 73 yards, 3:09.**
- KC – Billy Jackson 4-yard run (Nick Lowery kick), 6:35. Tied 7–7. **Drive: 9 plays, 69 yards, 5:16.**

**Second quarter**

- DET – Eddie Murray 34-yard field goal, 13:53. Lions 10–7. **Drive: 8 plays, 23 yards, 3:00.**
- DET – Freddie Scott 40-yard pass from Eric Hipple (Eddie Murray kick), 4:29. Lions 17–7. **Drive: 5 plays, 60 yards, 1:31.**

**Third quarter**

- KC – Nick Lowery 33-yard field goal, 8:47. Lions 17–10. **Drive: 9 plays, 47 yards, 6:13.**
- DET – Eddie Murray 46 yard field goal 3:13. Lions 20–10. **Drive: 11 plays, 44 yards, 5:34.**

**Fourth quarter**

- DET – Billy Sims 4 yard run (Eddie Murray kick), 2:46. Lions 27–10. **Drive: 10 plays, 70 yards, 4:42.**

**Top passers**

- KC – Steve Fuller – 10/17, 131 yards
- DET – Eric Hipple – 10/22, 132 yards, 2 TD

**Top rushers**

- KC – Joe Delaney – 17 rushes, 77 yards
- DET – Billy Sims – 20 rushes, 64 yards, TD

**Top receivers**

- KC – J. T. Smith – 5 receptions, 61 yards
- DET – Freddie Scott – 3 receptions, 71 yards, TD

==== Week 14: at Denver Broncos ====
Week 14: Kansas City Chiefs at Denver Broncos – Game summary

Quarter	1	2	3	4	Total
Chiefs	0	6	7	0	**13**
**Broncos**	7	9	0	0	**16**

at Mile High Stadium, Denver, Colorado

- Date: December 6
- Game time: 2:00 p.m. MST
- Game weather: Mostly sunny, 68 °F (20 °C)
- Game attendance: 74,744
- Referee: Red Cashion
- TV announcers (NBC): Don Criqui and John Brodie
- Recap, Game Book

Game information

**First quarter**

- DEN – Rob Lytle 2-yard run (Fred Steinfort kick), 12:03. Broncos 7–0. **Drive: 4 plays, 83 yards, 2:57.**

**Second quarter**

- DEN – Fred Steinfort 23-yard field goal, 14:16. Broncos 10–0. **Drive: 15 plays, 75 yards, 6:03.**
- DEN – Larry Canada 2-yard run (kick aborted), 5:37. Broncos 16–0. **Drive: 11 plays, 77 yards, 5:57.**
- KC – Nick Lowery 43-yard field goal, 1:04. Broncos 16–3. **Drive: 11 plays, 55 yards, 4:33.**
- KC – Nick Lowery 45-yard field goal, 0:30. Broncos 16–6. **Drive: 4 plays, 0 yards, 0:22.**

**Third quarter**

- KC – James Hadnot 1-yard run (Nick Lowery kick), 1:48. Broncos 16–13. **Drive: 8 plays, 80 yards, 3:37.**

**Fourth quarter**

- No scoring plays.

**Top passers**

- KC – Steve Fuller – 18/34, 261 yards, INT
- DEN – Craig Morton – 16/24, 281 yards

**Top rushers**

- KC – Joe Delaney – 11 rushes, 36 yards
- DEN – Dave Preston – 13 rushes, 38 yards

**Top receivers**

- KC – Al Dixon – 6 receptions, 86 yards
- DEN – Steve Watson – 2 receptions, 103 yards

==== Week 15: vs. Miami Dolphins ====
Week 15: Miami Dolphins at Kansas City Chiefs – Game summary

Quarter	1	2	3	4	Total
**Dolphins**	7	3	0	7	**17**
Chiefs	0	7	0	0	**7**

at Arrowhead Stadium, Kansas City, Missouri

- Date: December 13
- Game time: 1:00 p.m. CST
- Game weather: Overcast, 41 °F (5 °C)
- Game attendance: 57,407
- Referee: Pat Haggerty
- TV announcers (NBC): Marv Albert and Len Dawson
- Recap, Game Book

Game information

**First quarter**

- MIA – Tony Nathan 5-yard run (Uwe von Schamann kick), 2:36. Dolphins 7–0. **Drive: 6 plays, 38 yards, 2:23.**

**Second quarter**

- KC – Al Dixon 2-yard pass from Steve Fuller (Nick Lowery kick), 12:00. Tied 7–7. **Drive: 12 plays, 80 yards, 5:36.**
- MIA – Uwe von Schamann 39-yard field goal, 5:06. Dolphins 10–7. **Drive: 12 plays, 47 yards, 6:54.**

**Third quarter**

- No scoring plays.

**Fourth quarter**

- MIA – Andra Franklin 1-yard run (Uwe von Schamann kick), 14:13. Dolphins 17–7. **Drive: 9 plays, 44 yards, 4:05.**

**Top passers**

- MIA – Don Strock – 8/16, 109 yards, 2 INT
- KC – Steve Fuller – 21/37, 206 yards, TD, INT

**Top rushers**

- MIA – Andra Franklin – 17 rushes, 40 yards, TD
- KC – Steve Fuller – 8 rushes, 42 yards

**Top receivers**

- MIA – Tommy Vigorito – 3 receptions, 42 yards
- KC – J. T. Smith – 5 receptions, 99 yards

==== Week 16: at Minnesota Vikings ====
Week 16: Kansas City Chiefs at Minnesota Vikings – Game summary

Quarter	1	2	3	4	Total
**Chiefs**	3	0	7	0	**10**
Vikings	3	0	3	0	**6**

at Metropolitan Stadium, Bloomington, Minnesota

- Date: December 20
- Game time: 12:00 p.m. CST
- Game weather: Cloudy, 21 °F (−6 °C)
- Game attendance: 41,110
- Referee: Tom Dooley
- TV announcers (NBC): Merle Harmon and Jim Turner
- Recap, Game Book

Game information

**First quarter**

- MIN – Rick Danmeier 43-yard field goal, 10:33. Vikings 3–0. **Drive: 14 plays, 50 yards, 4:27.**
- KC – Nick Lowery 30-yard field goal, 1:12. Tied 3–3. **Drive: 4 plays, 9 yards, 1:41.**

**Second quarter**

- No scoring plays.

**Third quarter**

- KC – Stan Rome 15-yard pass from Steve Fuller (Nick Lowery kick), 10:03. Chiefs 10–3. **Drive: 8 plays, 37 yards, 4:57.**
- MIN – Rick Danmeier 33-yard field goal, 4:30. Chiefs 10–6. **Drive: 6 plays, 30 yards, 1:15.**

**Fourth quarter**

- No scoring plays.

**Top passers**

- KC – Steve Fuller – 12/16, 145 yards, TD, INT
- MIN – Tommy Kramer – 17/38, 177 yards, INT

**Top rushers**

- KC – Billy Jackson – 25 rushes, 102 yards
- MIN – Tony Galbreath – 11 rushes, 55 yards

**Top receivers**

- KC – Carlos Carson – 3 receptions, 78 yards
- MIN – Tony Galbreath – 7 receptions, 60 yards

== Standings ==
AFC West
	W	L	T	PCT	DIV	CONF	PF	PA	STK
^{(3)} San Diego Chargers	10	6	0	.625	6–2	8–4	478	390	W2
Denver Broncos	10	6	0	.625	5–3	7–5	321	289	L1
Kansas City Chiefs	9	7	0	.563	5–3	7–5	343	290	W1
Oakland Raiders	7	9	0	.438	2–6	5–7	273	343	L2
Seattle Seahawks	6	10	0	.375	2–6	6–8	322	388	W1
