= 1981 Seattle Seahawks season =

American football team season

- Owner: The Nordstrom family
- General manager: John Thompson
- Head coach: Jack Patera
- Home stadium: Kingdome

Results
- Record: 6–10
- Division place: 5th AFC West
- Playoffs: Did not qualify
- All-Pros: None
- Pro Bowlers: WR Steve Largent

The 1981 Seattle Seahawks season was the team's sixth season with the National Football League (NFL). The Seahawks got off to a terrible start, losing six of their first seven games, on the way to a 6–10 season. Seattle opened their season at Cincinnati, and held a 21–0 lead before the Bengals rallied for an improbable 27–21 win. This loss was a portent into the season. Later in the season, the Seahawks would go on to lose a 24–3 3rd quarter lead at home to the Raiders, ultimately losing 32–31. Seven of their 10 losses were by two possessions or more.

The Achilles' heel for the team was the running game on offense and defense. On offense, they ranked 27th in yards and 26th in yards per attempt. On defense, they ranked 27th in yards and 28th in yards per attempt. Only once did the defense hold a team under 100 yards rushing, which was against the Chargers in San Diego, where they lost 24–10.

The disappointing season had some memorable highlights. Among them, their then-biggest come-from-behind victory which took place at home against the Steelers on November 8th, where the Seahawks went from losing 21–3 to winning 24–21. On November 16th, the Seahawks won their first victory over the San Diego Chargers 44–23 after losing their first seven meetings. Steve Largent had a stellar season with 1,224 receiving yards. Jim Zorn had a bounce-back season, completing a career high 59% of his passes, 13 touchdowns, 9 interceptions, and 6.2 yards per attempt before his injury against the Raiders at home.

== Offseason ==
=== Draft ===
1981 Seattle Seahawks draft
Round	Pick	Player	Position	College	Notes
1	4	Kenny Easley * ^{†}	Safety	UCLA	
2	31	David Hughes	Running back	Boise State	
3	58	Bill Dugan	Guard	Penn State	
4	87	Scott Phillips	Wide receiver	BYU	
5	114	Edwin Bailey	Guard	South Carolina State	
6	140	Steve Durham	Defensive end	Clemson	
7	170	Ron Johnson	Wide receiver	Long Beach State	
7	186	Brad Scovill	Tight end	Penn State	
8	196	Eric Lane	Running back	BYU	
9	223	Jim Stone	Running back	Notre Dame	
9	236	Jimbo Whatley	Wide receiver	Washington State	
10	252	Ken Dawson	Running back	Savannah State	
11	279	Lance Olander	Running back	Colorado	
12	306	Jeff Bednarek	Defensive tackle	Pacific	
Made roster † Pro Football Hall of Fame * Made at least one Pro Bowl during career

=== Undrafted free agents ===
1981 undrafted free agents of note
Player	Position	College
Mike Babb	Punter	Oregon
Kim Baker	Linebacker	Nebraska
David Bayle	Tight End	Washington
Dan Boomhower	Running back	Kearney State
Dave Boschma	Safety	Linfield
Chris Buono	Safety	Furman
Brad Chace	Safety	Colorado
Bob Chauza	Tackle	Northwest Missouri State
Bob Danenhauer	Linebacker	Nebraska–Omaha
Bill Fenn	Fullback	Illinois State
Steve Griffiths	Linebacker	Penn State

== Personnel ==
=== Staff ===
1981 Seattle Seahawks staff
**Front office**: Managing general partner – Herman Sarkowsky; general manager – John Thompson; Assistant general manager – Mark Duncan; Director of player personnel – Dick Mansperger; Director of pro scouting – Chuck Allen; **Head coaches**: Head coach – Jack Patera; **Offensive coaches**: Offensive/quarterbacks/receivers – Jerry Rhome; Offensive backs – Andy MacDonald; Offensive line – Howard Mudd	**Defensive coaches**: Defensive/linebackers – Jackie Simpson; Defensive line – Jim E. Mora; Defensive backs – Jack Christiansen; **Special teams coaches**: Special teams – Rusty Tillman; **Strength and conditioning**: Head trainer – Bruce Scott; Assistant trainer – Jim Whitesel

=== Final roster ===
1981 Seattle Seahawks roster
**Quarterbacks (QB)**: 12 Sam Adkins; 17 Dave Krieg; **10** Jim Zorn; **Running backs (RB)**: 30 Theotis Brown; **33** Dan Doornink; 46 David Hughes; 32 Horace Ivory; 43 Jim Jodat; 37 Eric Lane; **47** Sherman Smith; **Wide receivers (WR)**: 85 Paul Johns; **80** Steve Largent; **84** Sam McCullum; 83 Steve Raible; **Tight ends (TE)**: **81** John Sawyer; 86 Mike Tice	**Offensive linemen (OL)**: **76** Steve August T; **65** Edwin Bailey G; 68 Dennis Boyd T; 66 Bill Dugan G; **64** Ron Essink T; 54 Art Kuehn C; **78** Bob Newton G; **51** John Yarno C; **Defensive linemen (DL)**: 63 Fred Anderson DE; **79** Jacob Green DE; **75** Robert Hardy DT; 69 Doug Sutherland DT; **74** Manu Tuiasosopo DE/DT	**Linebackers (LB)**: 58 Terry Beeson MLB; **53** Keith Butler OLB; **55** Michael Jackson OLB; 59 Rodell Thomas OLB; 60 Kevin Turner OLB; **Defensive backs (DB)**: **22** Dave Brown CB; 25 Don Dufek FS; **45** Kenny Easley SS; **44** John Harris FS; 27 Gregg Johnson CB/S; 26 Kerry Justin CB; 21 Vic Minor FS; **42** Keith Simpson CB; **Special teams (ST)**: 2 Wilson Alvarez K; 6 Frank Garcia P; 3 Vince Wagner K	**Reserve**: 82 Mark Bell DE (IR); 36 Larry Brinson RB (IR); 50 Brian Flones LB (IR); 56 Greg Gaines LB (IR); 1 Efrén Herrera K (IR); 89 Mark McGrath WR (IR); **52** Joe Norman LB (IR); 8 Jeff West P (IR); **70** Mike White DT (IR); Rookies in italics 45 active, 9 reserve

- Starters in bold.
- (*) Denotes players that were selected for the 1982 Pro Bowl.

== Schedule ==
=== Preseason ===
Week	Date	Opponent	Result	Record	Venue	Recap
1	August 5	San Francisco 49ers	**L** 24–27 (OT)	0–1	Kingdome	Recap
2	August 14	St. Louis Cardinals	**L** 21–30	0–2	Kingdome	Recap
3	August 22	at San Francisco 49ers	**L** 17–24	0–3	Candlestick Park	Recap
4	August 28	Baltimore Colts	**W** 31–17	1–3	Kingdome	Recap

Source: Seahawks Media Guides

=== Regular season ===
Week	Date	Opponent	Result	Record	Venue	Recap
1	September 6	at Cincinnati Bengals	**L** 21–27	0–1	Riverfront Stadium	Recap
2	September 13	**Denver Broncos**	**W** 13–10	1–1	Kingdome	Recap
3	September 20	at **Oakland Raiders**	**L** 10–20	1–2	Oakland–Alameda County Coliseum	Recap
4	September 27	**Kansas City Chiefs**	**L** 14–20	1–3	Kingdome	Recap
5	October 4	at **San Diego Chargers**	**L** 10–24	1–4	Jack Murphy Stadium	Recap
6	October 11	at Houston Oilers	**L** 17–35	1–5	Houston Astrodome	Recap
7	October 18	New York Giants	**L** 0–32	1–6	Kingdome	Recap
8	October 25	at New York Jets	**W** 19–3	2–6	Shea Stadium	Recap
9	November 1	at Green Bay Packers	**L** 24–34	2–7	Lambeau Field	Recap
10	November 8	Pittsburgh Steelers	**W** 24–21	3–7	Kingdome	Recap
11	November 16	**San Diego Chargers**	**W** 44–23	4–7	Kingdome	Recap
12	November 22	at **Kansas City Chiefs**	**L** 13–40	4–8	Arrowhead Stadium	Recap
13	November 29	**Oakland Raiders**	**L** 31–32	4–9	Kingdome	Recap
14	December 6	New York Jets	**W** 27–23	5–9	Kingdome	Recap
15	December 13	at **Denver Broncos**	**L** 13–23	5–10	Mile High Stadium	Recap
16	December 20	Cleveland Browns	**W** 42–21	6–10	Kingdome	Recap
Note: Intra-division opponents are in **bold** text.

Source: 1981 NFL season results

== Standings ==
AFC West
	W	L	T	PCT	DIV	CONF	PF	PA	STK
^{(3)} San Diego Chargers	10	6	0	.625	6–2	8–4	478	390	W2
Denver Broncos	10	6	0	.625	5–3	7–5	321	289	L1
Kansas City Chiefs	9	7	0	.563	5–3	7–5	343	290	W1
Oakland Raiders	7	9	0	.438	2–6	5–7	273	343	L2
Seattle Seahawks	6	10	0	.375	2–6	6–8	322	388	W1

== Game summaries ==
=== Preseason ===
==== Week P1: vs. San Francisco 49ers ====
Preseason Week One: Seattle Seahawks vs. San Francisco 49ers – Game summary

Quarter	1	2	3	4	OT	Total
49ers	7	7	3	7	3	27
Seahawks	7	3	0	14	0	24

at Kingdome, Seattle

- Date: August 5
- Game time: 7:34 pm local
- Game weather: indoors
- Game attendance: 56,958
- Referee: Fred Silva
- TV: KIRO
- Gamebook

==== Week P2: vs. St. Louis Cardinals ====
Preseason Week Two: Seattle Seahawks vs. St. Louis Cardinals – Game summary

Quarter	1	2	3	4	Total
Cardinals	6	7	7	10	30
Seahawks	0	7	7	7	21

at Kingdome, Seattle

- Date: August 14
- Game time: 7:34 pm local
- Game weather: indoors
- Game attendance: 55,520
- Referee: Jim Tunney
- TV: KIRO
- Gamebook

==== Week P3: at San Francisco 49ers ====
Preseason Week Three: Seattle Seahawks at San Francisco 49ers – Game summary

Quarter	1	2	3	4	Total
Seahawks	17	0	0	0	17
49ers	7	0	7	10	24

at Candlestick Park, San Francisco

- Date: August 22
- Game time: 6:05 pm local
- Game weather: cloudy, 60 °F (16 °C), wind NE 19 miles per hour (31 km/h)
- Game attendance: 37,563
- Referee: Bob McElwee
- TV: KIRO
- Gamebook

==== Week P4: vs. Baltimore Colts ====
Preseason Week Four: Seattle Seahawks vs. Baltimore Colts – Game summary

Quarter	1	2	3	4	Total
Colts	7	7	0	3	17
Seahawks	10	0	14	7	31

at Kingdome, Seattle

- Date: August 28
- Game time: 7:34 pm local
- Game weather: indoors
- Game attendance: 55,794
- Referee: Dick Jorgensen
- TV: KIRO
- Gamebook

=== Regular season ===
==== Week 1: at Cincinnati Bengals ====
Week One: Seattle Seahawks at Cincinnati Bengals – Game summary

Quarter	1	2	3	4	Total
Seahawks	21	0	0	0	21
Bengals	0	10	10	7	27

at Riverfront Stadium, Cincinnati, Ohio

- Date: September 6
- Game time: 1:00 pm local
- Game weather: partly cloudy, 70 °F (21 °C), 71% humidity, wind NE 4 miles per hour (6.4 km/h)
- Game attendance: 41,177
- Referee: Bob Frederic
- TV: NBC
- Gamebook

Game information

First quarter

- SEA – John Harris 29-yard interception return (Efrén Herrera kick), 8:53 (SEA 7–0)
- SEA – Steve Largent 36-yard pass from Jim Zorn (Efrén Herrera kick), 5:27 (SEA 14–0)
- SEA – Jim Jodat 1-yard run (Efrén Herrera kick), 3:19 (SEA 21–0)

Second quarter

- CIN – Jim Breech 25-yard field goal, 10:44 (SEA 21–3)
- CIN – Pete Johnson 3-yard run (Jim Breech kick), 0:57 (SEA 21–10)

Third quarter

- CIN – Jim Breech 40-yard field goal, 11:32 (SEA 21–13)
- CIN – Archie Griffin 3-yard run (Jim Breech kick), 2:52 (SEA 21–20)

Fourth quarter

- CIN – Pete Johnson 2-yard run (Jim Breech kick), 5:04 (CIN 27–21)

Top passers

- SEA – Jim Zorn: 21/41, 230 yds, 1 TD, 1 INT
- CIN – Turk Schonert: 9/18, 130 yds

Top rushers

- SEA – Jim Jodat: 8 car, 21 yds, 1 TD
- CIN – Pete Johnson: 20 car, 84 yds, 2 TD

Top receivers

- SEA – Steve Largent: 8 rec, 114 yds, 1 TD
- CIN – Cris Collinsworth: 4 rec, 65 yds

Team – pass – rush – total – to

- SEA –230 – 60 – 290 – 4
- CIN – 165 – 210 – 375 – 4

==== Week 2: vs. Denver Broncos ====
Week Two: Seattle Seahawks vs. Denver Broncos – Game summary

Quarter	1	2	3	4	Total
Broncos	3	7	0	0	10
Seahawks	7	3	3	0	13

at Kingdome, Seattle

- Date: September 13
- Game time: 1:03 pm local
- Game weather: indoors
- Game attendance: 58,513
- Referee: Fred Silva
- TV announcers (NBC): Bob Costas and Jim Turner
- Gamebook

Game information

First quarter

- DEN – Fred Steinfort 30-yard field goal, 8:34 (DEN 3–0)
- SEA – Dennis Boyd 3-yard pass from Jim Zorn (Efrén Herrera kick), 2:48 (SEA 7–3)

Second quarter

- SEA – Efrén Herrera 43-yard field goal, 2:39 (SEA 10–3)
- DEN – Riley Odoms 11-yard pass from Craig Morton (Fred Steinfort kick), 1:06 (Tied 10–10)

Third quarter

- SEA – Efrén Herrera 22-yard field goal, 5:53 (SEA 13–10)

Fourth quarter

- No scoring plays

Top passers

- DEN – Craig Morton: 144/25, 161 yds, 1 TD, 1 INT
- SEA – Jim Zorn: 24/34, 199 yds, 1 TD, 2 INT

Top rushers

- DEN – Rick Parros: 13 car, 69 yds
- SEA – Sherman Smith: 11 car, 58 yds

Top receivers

- DEN – Steve Watson: 2 rec, 36 yds
- SEA – David Hughes: 6 rec, 59 yds

Team – pass – rush – total – to

- DEN – 142 – 110 – 252 – 2
- SEA – 156 – 111 – 267 – 2

==== Week 3: at Oakland Raiders ====
Week Three: Seattle Seahawks at Oakland Raiders – Game summary

Quarter	1	2	3	4	Total
Seahawks	0	3	7	0	10
Raiders	7	6	0	7	20

at Oakland–Alameda County Coliseum, Oakland, California

- Date: September 20
- Game time: 1:01 pm local
- Game weather: clear, 68 °F (20 °C), 58% humidity, wind SW 9 miles per hour (14 km/h)
- Game attendance: 45,725
- Referee: Pat Haggerty
- TV announcers (NBC): Phil Stone and Gene Washington
- Gamebook

Game information

First quarter

- OAK – Jim Plunkett 13-yard run (Chris Bahr kick), 6:14 (OAK 7–0)

Second quarter

- SEA – Efrén Herrera 26-yard field goal, 4:45 (OAK 7–3)
- OAK – Morris Bradshaw 29-yard pass from Jim Plunkett (PAT failed), 0:13 (OAK 13–3)

Third quarter

- SEA – Sam McCullum 36-yard pass from Jim Zorn (Efrén Herrera kick), 8:06 (OAK 13–10)

Fourth quarter

- OAK – Derrick Jensen 1-yard run (Chris Bahr kick), 11:24 (OAK 20–10)

Top passers

- SEA – Jim Zorn: 24/43, 327 yds, 1 TD, 1 INT
- OAK – Jim Plunkett: 20/30, 262 yds, 1 TD, 2 INT

Top rushers

- SEA – Sherman Smith: 4 car, 25 yds
- OAK – Derrick Jensen: 19 car, 84 yds, 1 TD

Top receivers

- SEA – Sam McCullum: 6 rec, 122 yds, 1 TD
- OAK – Morris Bradshaw: 3 rec, 74 yds, 1 TD

Team – pass – rush – total – to

- SEA – 308 – 82 – 390 – 2
- OAK – 242 – 190 – 432 – 3

==== Week 4: vs. Kansas City Chiefs ====
Week Four: Seattle Seahawks vs. Kansas City Chiefs – Game summary

Quarter	1	2	3	4	Total
Chiefs	7	13	0	0	20
Seahawks	0	7	7	0	14

at Kingdome, Seattle

- Date: September 27
- Game time: 1:03 pm local
- Game weather: indoors
- Game attendance: 59,255
- Referee: Tom Dooley
- TV announcers (NBC): Phil Stone and Gene Washington
- Gamebook

Game information

First quarter

- KC – Ted McKnight 2-yard run (Nick Lowery kick), 9:56 (KC 7–0)

Second quarter

- KC – Bill Kenney 1-yard run (Nick Lowery kick), 13:41 (KC 14–0)
- KC – Nick Lowery 30-yard field goal, 6:40 (KC 17–0)
- KC – Nick Lowery 38-yard field goal, 5:28 (KC 20–0)
- SEA – Sam McCullum 11-yard pass from Jim Zorn (Efrén Herrera kick), 1:58 (KC 20–7)

Third quarter

- SEA – Sherman Smith 2-yard run (Efrén Herrera kick), 11:01 (KC 20–14)

Fourth quarter

- No scoring plays

Top passers

- KC – Bill Kenney: 16/25, 239 yds
- SEA – Jim Zorn: 31/47, 308 yds, 1 TD

Top rushers

- KC – Joe Delaney: 15 car, 45 yds
- SEA – Jim Zorn: 4 car, 48 yds

Top receivers

- KC – J.T. Smith: 5 rec, 81 yds
- SEA – David Hughes: 12 rec, 103 yds

Team – pass – rush – total – to

- KC – 227 – 154 – 381 – 2
- SEA – 277 – 82 – 359 – 1

==== Week 5: at San Diego Chargers ====
Week Five: Seattle Seahawks at San Diego Chargers – Game summary

Quarter	1	2	3	4	Total
Seahawks	0	7	0	3	10
Chargers	0	10	7	7	24

at Jack Murphy Stadium, San Diego

- Date: October 4
- Game time: 1:01 pm local
- Game weather: partly cloudy, 72 °F (22 °C), 68% humidity, wind W 10 miles per hour (16 km/h)
- Game attendance: 51,463
- Referee: Red Cashion
- TV announcers (NBC): Merle Harmon and George Kunz
- Gamebook

Game information

First quarter

- No scoring plays

Second quarter

- SEA – Steve Largent 34-yard pass from Jim Zorn (Efrén Herrera kick), 14:54 (SEA 7–0)
- SD – Rolf Benirschke 47-yard field goal, 11:54 (SEA 7–3)
- SD – Charlie Joiner 12-yard pass from Dan Fouts (Rolf Benirschke kick), 2:38 (SD 10–7)

Third quarter

- SD – Charlie Joiner 12-yard pass from Dan Fouts (Rolf Benirschke kick), 4:50 (SD 17–7)

Fourth quarter

- SEA – Efrén Herrera 11-yard field goal, 10:30 (SD 17–10)
- SD – Charlie Joiner 11-yard pass from Dan Fouts (Rolf Benirschke kick), 3:56 (SD 24–10)

Top passers

- SEA – Jim Zorn: 16/34, 229 yds, 1 TD, 1 INT
- SD – Dan Fouts: 30/41, 302 yds, 3 TD

Top rushers

- SEA – Jim Zorn: 6 car, 29 yds
- SD – John Cappelletti: 14 car, 85 yds

Top receivers

- SEA – Steve Largent: 5 rec, 118 yds, 1 TD
- SD – Clarence Williams: 10 rec, 89 yds

Team – pass – rush – total – to

- SEA – 200 – 92 – 292 – 1
- SD – 272 – 99 – 371 – 2

==== Week 6: at Houston Oilers ====
Week Six: Seattle Seahawks at Houston Oilers – Game summary

Quarter	1	2	3	4	Total
Seahawks	10	0	0	7	17
Oilers	7	7	0	21	35

at Astrodome, Houston, Texas

- Date: October 11
- Game time: 1:00 pm local
- Game weather: indoors
- Game attendance: 42,671
- Referee: Jerry Seeman
- TV announcers (NBC): Mike Adamle and Bob Trumpy
- Gamebook

Game information

First quarter

- SEA – Efrén Herrera 41-yard field goal, 8:36 (SEA 3–0)
- SEA – David Hughes 17-yard pass from Jim Zorn (Efrén Herrera kick), 3:58 (SEA 10–0)
- HOU – Ken Burrough 31-yard pass from Ken Stabler (Toni Fritsch kick), 1:33 (SEA 10–7)

Second quarter

- HOU – Earl Campbell 1-yard run (Toni Fritsch kick), 1:16 (HOU 14–10)

Third quarter

- No scoring plays

Fourth quarter

- HOU – Dave Casper 32-yard pass from Ken Stabler (Toni Fritsch kick), 14:54 (HOU 21–10)
- HOU – Ken Burrough 24-yard pass from Ken Stabler (Toni Fritsch kick), 11:55 (HOU 28–10)
- HOU – Earl Campbell 4-yard run (Toni Fritsch kick), 6:59 (HOU 35–10)
- SEA – Steve Largent 31-yard pass from Sam Adkins (Efrén Herrera kick), 5:18 (HOU 35–17)

Top passers

- SEA – Jim Zorn: 19/30, 145 yds, 1 TD, 2 INT
- HOU – Ken Stabler: 12/18, 156 yds, 3 TD

Top rushers

- SEA – Sam Adkins: 3 car, 28 yds
- HOU – Earl Campbell: 39 car, 186 yds, 2 TD

Top receivers

- SEA – Steve Largent: 4 rec, 65 yds, 1 TD
- HOU – Ken Burrough: 4 rec, 74 yds, 2 TD

Team – pass – rush – total – to

- SEA – 214 – 75 – 289 – 3
- HOU – 156 – 216 – 372 – 1

==== Week 7: vs. New York Giants ====
Week Seven: Seattle Seahawks vs. New York Giants – Game summary

Quarter	1	2	3	4	Total
Giants	3	10	13	6	32
Seahawks	0	0	0	0	0

at Kingdome, Seattle

- Date: October 18
- Game time: 1:03 pm local
- Game weather: indoors
- Game attendance: 56,134
- Referee: Gordon McCarter
- TV announcers (CBS): Tom Brookshier and Roger Staubach
- Gamebook

Game information

First quarter

- NYG – Joe Danelo 29-yard field goal, 9:23 (NYG 3–0)

Second quarter

- NYG – Gary Shirk 6-yard pass from Phil Simms (Joe Danelo kick), 12:09 (NYG 10–0)
- NYG – Joe Danelo 54-yard field goal, 4:30 (NYG 13–0)

Third quarter

- NYG – Joe Danelo 21-yard field goal, 12:10 (NYG 16–0)
- NYG – Joe Danelo 47-yard field goal, 5:39 (NYG 19–0)
- NYG – Rob Carpenter 2-yard run (Joe Danelo kick), 3:5 (NYG 26–0)

Fourth quarter

- NYG – Joe Danelo 31-yard field goal, 11:15 (NYG 29–0)
- NYG – Joe Danelo 37-yard field goal, 0:16 (NYG 32–0)

Top passers

- NYG – Phil Simms: 12/27, 103 yds, 1 TD, 1 INT
- SEA – Jim Zorn: 14/22, 84 yds, 1 INT

Top rushers

- NYG – Rob Carpenter: 21 car, 116 yds, 1 TD
- SEA – Theotis Brown: 4 car, 9 yds

Top receivers

- NYG – Gary Shirk: 4 rec, 30 yds, 1 TD
- SEA – Steve Largent: 4 rec, 40 yds

Team – pass – rush – total – to

- NYG – 88 – 213 – 301 – 1
- SEA – 98 – 29 – 127 – 4

==== Week 8: at New York Jets ====
Week Eight: Seattle Seahawks at New York Jets – Game summary

Quarter	1	2	3	4	Total
Seahawks	0	7	6	6	19
Jets	0	0	3	0	3

at Shea Stadium, New York

- Date: October 25
- Game time: 4:01 pm local
- Game weather: overcast, 55 °F (13 °C), 64% humidity, wind SE 17 miles per hour (27 km/h)
- Game attendance: 49,678
- Referee: Bob McElwee
- TV announcers (NBC): Charlie Jones and Len Dawson
- Gamebook

Game information

First quarter

- No scoring plays

Second quarter

- SEA – Steve Largent 10-yard run (Efrén Herrera kick), 2:55 (SEA 7–0)

Third quarter

- SEA – Steve Largent 27-yard pass from Jim Zorn (PAT failed), 12:53 (SEA 13–0)
- NYJ – Pat Leahy 34-yard field goal, 7:53 (SEA 13–3)

Fourth quarter

- SEA – Sherman Smith 4-yard run (PAT failed), 13:42 (SEA 19–3)

Top passers

- SEA – Jim Zorn: 13/21, 172 yds, 1 TD
- NYJ – Richard Todd: 14/29, 121 yds, 2 INT

Top rushers

- SEA – Theotis Brown: 14 car, 104 yds
- NYJ – Bruce Harper: 8 car, 60 yds

Top receivers

- SEA – Steve Largent: 6 rec, 80 yds, 1 TD
- NYJ – Scott Dierking: 2 rec, 22 yds

Team – pass – rush – total – to

- SEA – 163 – 217 – 380 – 1
- NYJ – 101 – 118 – 219 – 4

==== Week 9: at Green Bay Packers ====
Week Nine: Seattle Seahawks at Green Bay Packers – Game summary

Quarter	1	2	3	4	Total
Seahawks	7	14	3	0	24
Packers	7	14	7	6	34

at Lambeau Field, Green Bay, Wisconsin

- Date: November 1
- Game time: 1:02 pm local
- Game weather: clear, 56 °F (13 °C), 75% humidity, wind NE 5 miles per hour (8.0 km/h)
- Game attendance: 49,467
- Referee: Chuck Heberling
- TV announcers (NBC): Sam Nover and Dave Rowe
- Gamebook

Game information

First quarter

- SEA – John Harris 42-yard interception return (Efrén Herrera kick), 10:47 (SEA 7–0)
- GB – Paul Coffman 7-yard pass from David Whitehurst (Jan Stenerud kick), 5:57 (Tied 7–7)

Second quarter

- SEA – Dan Doornink 12-yard pass from Jim Zorn (Efrén Herrera kick), 11:03 (SEA 14–7)
- GB – David Whitehurst 1-yard run (Jan Stenerud kick), 5:19 (Tied 14–14)
- GB – James Lofton 8-yard pass from David Whitehurst (Jan Stenerud kick), 4:18 (GB 21–14)
- SEA – Dan Doornink 14-yard pass from Jim Zorn (Efrén Herrera kick), 0:24 (Tied 21–21)

Third quarter

- SEA – Efrén Herrera 54-yard field goal, 5:54 (SEA 24–21)
- GB – James Lofton 38-yard pass from David Whitehurst (Jan Stenerud kick), 1:02 (GB 28–24)

Fourth quarter

- GB – Jan Stenerud 19-yard field goal, 1:58 (GB 31–24)
- GB – Jan Stenerud 36-yard field goal, 0:45 (GB 34–24)

Top passers

- SEA – Jim Zorn: 12/23, 108 yds, 2 TD
- GB – David Whitehurst: 19/31, 205 yds, 3 TD, 2 INT

Top rushers

- SEA – Theotis Brown: 17 car, 89 yds
- GB – Gerry Ellis: 23 car, 127 yds

Top receivers

- SEA – Steve Largent: 3 rec, 45 yds
- GB – James Lofton: 4 rec, 63 yds, 2 TD

Team – pass – rush – total – to

- SEA – 102 – 119 – 221 – 3
- GB – 195 – 182 – 337 – 3

==== Week 10: vs. Pittsburgh Steelers ====
Week Ten: Seattle Seahawks vs. Pittsburgh Steelers – Game summary

Quarter	1	2	3	4	Total
Steelers	7	14	0	0	21
Seahawks	3	7	0	14	24

at Kingdome, Seattle

- Date: November 8
- Game time: 1:01 pm local
- Game weather: indoors
- Game attendance: 59,058
- Referee: Dick Jorgensen
- TV announcers (NBC): Jay Randolph and Rocky Bleier
- Gamebook

Game information

First quarter

- PIT – Franco Harris 6-yard run (David Trout kick), 8:15 (PIT 7–0)
- SEA – Efrén Herrera 37-yard field goal, 0:17 (PIT 7–3)

Second quarter

- PIT – Mark Malone 90-yard pass from Terry Bradshaw (David Trout kick), 14:11 (PIT 14–3)
- PIT – Sidney Thornton 4-yard run (David Trout kick), 1:12 (PIT 21–3)
- SEA – Dan Doornink 44-yard pass from Jim Zorn (Efrén Herrera kick), 0:37 (PIT 21–10)

Third quarter

- No scoring plays

Fourth quarter

- SEA – Theotis Brown 1-yard run (Efrén Herrera kick), 13:13 (PIT 21–17)
- SEA – Theotis Brown 1-yard run (Efrén Herrera kick), 9:04 (SEA 24–21)

Top passers

- PIT – Terry Bradshaw: 13/22, 212 yds, 1 TD, 2 INT
- SEA – Jim Zorn: 18/25, 277 yds, 1 TD

Top rushers

- PIT – Franco Harris: 15 car, 61 yds, 1 TD
- SEA – Theotis Brown: 18 car, 43 yds, 2 TD

Top receivers

- PIT – Mark Malone: 1 rec, 90 yds, 1 TD
- SEA – Dan Doornink: 3 rec, 82 yds, 1 TD

Team – pass – rush – total – to

- PIT – 205 – 162 – 367 – 2
- SEA – 260 – 96 – 356 – 1

==== Week 11: vs. San Diego Chargers ====
Week Eleven: Seattle Seahawks vs. San Diego Chargers – Game summary

Quarter	1	2	3	4	Total
Chargers	7	10	0	6	23
Seahawks	0	24	14	6	44

at Kingdome, Seattle

- Date: November 16
- Game time: 6:05 pm local
- Game weather: indoors
- Game attendance: 58,628
- Referee: Bob Frederic
- TV announcers (ABC): Frank Gifford, Don Meredith, and Howard Cosell
- Gamebook

Game information

First quarter

- SD – Chuck Muncie 1-yard run (Rolf Benirschke kick), 6:35 (SD 7–0)

Second quarter

- SEA – Efrén Herrera 25-yard field goal, 12:43 (SD 7–3)
- SEA – Theotis Brown 2-yard run (Efrén Herrera kick), 11:27 (SEA 10–7)
- SEA – Sherman Smith 18-yard pass from Jim Zorn (Efrén Herrera kick), 5:56 (SEA 17–7)
- SD – Chuck Muncie 73-yard run (Rolf Benirschke kick), 4:26 (SEA 17–14)
- SEA – Theotis Brown 1-yard run (Efrén Herrera kick), 0:57 (SEA 24–14)
- SD – Rolf Benirschke 32-yard field goal, 0:03 (SEA 24–17)

Third quarter

- SEA – Dan Doornink 80-yard pass from Jim Zorn (Efrén Herrera kick), 5:46 (SEA 31–17)
- SEA – Dan Doornink 3-yard run (Efrén Herrera kick), 0:12 (SEA 38–17)

Fourth quarter

- SEA – Efrén Herrera 30-yard field goal, 13:05 (SEA 41–17)
- SD – Charlie Joiner 19-yard pass from Dan Fouts (PAT failed), 11:39 (SEA 41–23)
- SEA – Efrén Herrera 23-yard field goal, 6:11 (SEA 44–23)

Top passers

- SD – Dan Fouts: 20/34, 252 yds, 1 TD, 1 INT
- SEA – Jim Zorn: 11/22, 221 yds, 2 TD

Top rushers

- SD – Chuck Muncie: 20 car, 151 yds, 2 TD
- SEA – Theotis Brown: 18 car, 83 yds, 2 TD

Top receivers

- SD – Kellen Winslow: 7 rec, 106 yds
- SEA – Dan Doornink: 1 rec, 80 yds, 1 TD

Team – pass – rush – total – to

- SD – 291 – 195 – 486 – 4
- SEA – 212 – 156 – 368 – 0

==== Week 12: at Kansas City Chiefs ====
Week Twelve: Seattle Seahawks at Kansas City Chiefs – Game summary

Quarter	1	2	3	4	Total
Seahawks	3	3	7	0	13
Chiefs	3	17	7	13	40

at Arrowhead Stadium, Kansas City, Missouri

- Date: November 22
- Game time: 1:01 pm local
- Game weather: clear, 53 °F (12 °C), 40% humidity, wind SE 8 miles per hour (13 km/h)
- Game attendance: 49,002
- Referee: Fred Silva
- TV: NBC
- Gamebook

Game information

First quarter

- SEA – Efrén Herrera 26-yard field goal, 7:58 (SEA 3–0)
- KC – Nick Lowery 37-yard field goal, 2:46 (Tied 3–3)

Second quarter

- KC – Nick Lowery 24-yard field goal, 11:16 (KC 6–3)
- SEA – Efrén Herrera 30-yard field goal, 2:51 (Tied 6–6)
- KC – J.T. Smith 14-yard pass from Bill Kenney (Nick Lowery kick), 1:07 (KC 13–6)
- KC – Lloyd Burruss 46-yard interception return (Nick Lowery kick), 0:31 (KC 20–6)

Third quarter

- KC – Billy Jackson 1-yard run (Nick Lowery kick), 9:40 (KC 27–6)
- SEA – Steve Largent 30-yard pass from Jim Zorn (Efrén Herrera kick), 5:46 (KC 27–13)

Fourth quarter

- KC – Willie Scott 2-yard pass from Bill Kenney (Nick Lowery kick), 14:57 (KC 33–13)
- KC – Billy Jackson 2-yard run (Nick Lowery kick), 9:36 (KC 40–13)

Top passers

- SEA – Jim Zorn: 19/30, 258 yds, 1 TD, 1 INT
- KC – Bill Kenney: 17/22, 181 yds, 2 TD

Top rushers

- SEA – Theotis Brown: 16 car, 63 yds
- KC – James Hadnot: 10 car, 106 yds

Top receivers

- SEA – Steve Largent: 4 rec, 63 yds, 1 TD
- KC – J.T. Smith: 7 rec, 70 yds, 1 TD

Team – pass – rush – total – to

- SEA – 256 – 83 – 339 – 2
- KC – 181 – 269 – 450 – 0

==== Week 13: vs. Oakland Raiders ====
Week Thirteen: Seattle Seahawks vs. Oakland Raiders – Game summary

Quarter	1	2	3	4	Total
Raiders	0	3	8	21	32
Seahawks	0	10	14	7	31

at Kingdome, Seattle

- Date: November 29
- Game time: 1:02 pm local
- Game weather: indoors
- Game attendance: 57,147
- Referee: Gordon McCarter
- TV announcers (NBC): Jay Randolph and Gene Washington
- Gamebook

Game information

First quarter

- No scoring plays

Second quarter

- SEA – Efrén Herrera 22-yard field goal, 12:38 (SEA 3–0)
- OAK – Chris Bahr 20-yard field goal, 8:26 (Tied 3–3)
- SEA – Jim Zorn 3-yard run (Efrén Herrera kick), 5:44 (SEA 10–3)

Third quarter

- SEA – Sherman Smith 3-yard run (Efrén Herrera kick), 12:13 (SEA 17–3)
- SEA – Rodell Thomas 5-yard fumble return (Efrén Herrera kick), 12:00 (SEA 24–3)
- OAK – Safety, Jeff West stepped out of end zone, 6:22 (SEA 24–5)
- OAK – Derrick Ramsey 5-yard pass from Marc Wilson (PAT failed), 2:48 (SEA 24–11)

Fourth quarter

- OAK – Bob Chandler 8-yard pass from Marc Wilson (Chris Bahr kick), 11:02 (SEA 24–18)
- OAK – Arthur Whittington 16-yard pass from Marc Wilson (Chris Bahr kick), 5:53 (OAK 25–24)
- OAK – Derrick Jensen 3-yard run (Chris Bahr kick), 1:51 (OAK 32–24)
- SEA – Steve Largent 11-yard pass from Dave Krieg (Efrén Herrera kick), 0:08 (OAK 32–31)

Top passers

- OAK – Marc Wilson: 20/33, 218 yds, 3 TD, 1 INT
- SEA – Jim Zorn: 14/25, 239 yds

Top rushers

- OAK – Kenny King: 13 car, 75 yds
- SEA – Theotis Brown: 18 car, 34 yds

Top receivers

- OAK – Derrick Ramsey: 5 rec, 82 yds, 1 TD
- SEA – Sam McCullum: 4 rec, 91 yds

Team – pass – rush – total – to

- OAK – 156 – 181 – 337 – 4
- SEA – 314 – 69 – 383 – 1

==== Week 14: vs. New York Jets ====
Week Fourteen: Seattle Seahawks vs. New York Jets – Game summary

Quarter	1	2	3	4	Total
Jets	0	9	7	7	23
Seahawks	6	7	7	7	27

at Kingdome, Seattle

- Date: December 6
- Game time: 1:02 pm local
- Game weather: indoors
- Game attendance: 53,105
- Referee: Gene Barth
- TV announcers (NBC): Bob Costas and Bob Trumpy
- Gamebook

Game information

First quarter

- SEA – Sam McCullum 6-yard pass from Jim Zorn (PAT failed), 12:35 (SEA 6–0)

Second quarter

- NYJ – Scott Dierking 11-yard pass from Richard Todd (PAT failed), 13:02 (Tied 6–6)
- SEA – Theotis Brown 21-yard run (Wilson Álvarez kick), 5:25 (SEA 13–6)
- NYJ – Pat Leahy 26-yard field goal, 1:18 (SEA 13–9)

Third quarter

- NYJ – Scott Dierking 15-yard run (Pat Leahy kick), 13:19 (NYJ 16–13)
- SEA – Dave Krieg 1-yard run (Wilson Álvarez kick), 1:04 (SEA 20–16)

Fourth quarter

- NYJ – Kevin Long 1-yard pass from Richard Todd (Pat Leahy kick), 9:21 (NYJ 23–20)
- SEA – Steve Largent 57-yard pass from Dave Krieg (Wilson Álvarez kick), 8:21 (SEA 27–23)

Top passers

- NYJ – Richard Todd: 27/27, 286 yds, 2 TD, 2 INT
- SEA – Dave Krieg: 20/26, 264 yds, 2 TD, 3 INT

Top rushers

- NYJ – Kevin Long: 11 car, 51 yds
- SEA – Theotis Brown: 18 car, 73 yds, 1 TD

Top receivers

- NYJ – Bruce Harper: 8 rec, 67 yds
- SEA – Steve Largent: 7 rec, 169 yds, 1 TD

Team – pass – rush – total – to

- NYJ – 276 – 119 – 395 – 3
- SEA – 256 – 127 – 383 – 4

==== Week 15: at Denver Broncos ====
Week Fifteen: Seattle Seahawks at Denver Broncos – Game summary

Quarter	1	2	3	4	Total
Seahawks	0	3	3	7	13
Broncos	7	3	6	7	23

at Mile High Stadium, Denver, Colorado

- Date: December 13
- Game time: 2:00 pm local
- Game weather: partly cloudy, 45 °F (7 °C), 42% humidity, wind NE 14 miles per hour (23 km/h)
- Game attendance: 74,527
- Referee: Fred Wyant
- TV announcers (NBC): Jay Randolph and Jim Turner
- Gamebook

Game information

First quarter

- DEN – Riley Odoms 22-yard pass from Craig Morton (Fred Steinfort kick), 10:58 (DEN 7–0)

Second quarter

- SEA – Wilson Álvarez 28-yard field goal, 8:06 (DEN 7–3)
- DEN – Fred Steinfort 33-yard field goal, 0:00 (DEN 10–3)

Third quarter

- DEN – Fred Steinfort 43-yard field goal, 11:28 (DEN 13–3)
- DEN – Fred Steinfort 24-yard field goal, 8:13 (DEN 16–3)
- SEA – Wilson Álvarez 20-yard field goal, 1:58 (DEN 16–6)

Fourth quarter

- DEN – Rick Parros 8-yard run (Fred Steinfort kick), 3:12 (DEN 23–6)
- SEA – David Hughes 5-yard pass from Dave Krieg (Wilson Álvarez kick), 0:03 (DEN 23–13)

Top passers

- SEA – Dave Krieg: 18/40, 219 yds, 1 TD
- DEN – Craig Morton: 15/30, 144 yds, 1 TD, 2 INT

Top rushers

- SEA – Dan Doornink: 6 car, 22 yds
- DEN – Rick Parros: 16 car, 82 yds, 1 TD

Top receivers

- SEA – Steve Largent: 3 rec, 72 yds
- DEN – Riley Odoms: 2 rec, 38 yds, 1 TD

Team – pass – rush – total – to

- SEA – 199 – 86 – 285 – 5
- DEN – 136 – 237 – 373 – 3

==== Week 16: vs. Cleveland Browns ====
Week Sixteen: Seattle Seahawks vs. Cleveland Browns – Game summary

Quarter	1	2	3	4	Total
Browns	0	7	7	7	21
Seahawks	14	14	14	0	42

at Kingdome, Seattle

- Date: December 20
- Game time: 1:03 pm local
- Game weather: indoors
- Game attendance: 51,435
- Referee: Chuck Heberling
- TV announcers (NBC): Jay Randolph and Mike Haffner
- Gamebook

Game information

First quarter

- SEA – Kenny Easley 82-yard interception return (Wilson Álvarez kick), 11:42 (SEA 7–0)
- SEA – Theotis Brown 2-yard run (Wilson Álvarez kick), 1:30 (SEA 14–0)

Second quarter

- SEA – Steve Largent 4-yard pass from Dave Krieg (Wilson Álvarez kick), 14:32 (SEA 21–0)
- SEA – Gregg Johnson 31-yard fumble return (Wilson Álvarez kick), 13:37 (SEA 28–0)
- CLE – Greg Pruitt 5-yard pass from Paul McDonald (Matt Bahr kick), 6:44 (SEA 28–7)

Third quarter

- SEA – Paul Johns 10-yard pass from Dave Krieg (Wilson Álvarez kick), 8:26 (SEA 35–7)
- SEA – Steve Largent 14-yard pass from Dave Krieg (Wilson Álvarez kick), 7:25 (SEA 42–7)
- CLE – Dave Logan 16-yard pass from Paul McDonald (Matt Bahr kick), 5:36 (SEA 42–14)

Fourth quarter

- CLE – Calvin Hill 8-yard pass from Paul McDonald (Matt Bahr kick), 10:02 (SEA 42–21)

Top passers

- CLE – Paul McDonald: 24/34, 297 yds, 3 TD, 1 INT
- SEA – Dave Krieg: 14/21, 206 yds, 3 TD, 1 INT

Top rushers

- CLE – Charles White: 18 car, 68 yds
- SEA – Horace Ivory: 9 car, 38 yds

Top receivers

- CLE – Dave Logan: 5 rec, 101 yds, 1 TD
- SEA – Steve Largent: 6 rec, 80 yds, 2 TD

Team – pass – rush – total – to

- CLE – 301 – 151 – 452 – 10
- SEA – 182 – 110 – 292 – 5
