= 1981 Denver Broncos season =

American football team season

- Owner: Edgar Kaiser
- General manager: Grady Alderman
- Head coach: Dan Reeves
- Home stadium: Mile High Stadium

Results
- Record: 10–6
- Division place: 2nd AFC West
- Playoffs: Did not qualify

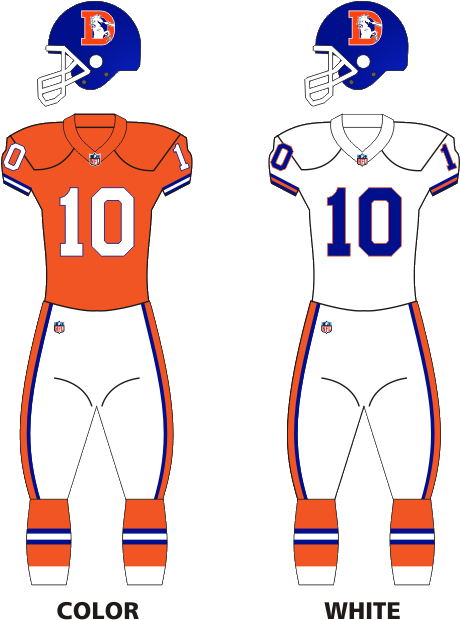
Uniforms of the Broncos from 1968-96

The 1981 Denver Broncos season was the team's 22nd year in professional football and its 12th with the National Football League (NFL). Led by first-year head coach Dan Reeves, the Broncos were 10–6, tied for first in the AFC West, but failed to make the postseason again due to their loss to the Buffalo Bills, who gained the final berth.

The Broncos were undefeated at home in 1981, but had six road losses. After a promising 8–3 start, Denver lost three of their final five games, including a critical loss against the Cincinnati Bengals in week 12. Entering the season finale against the Chicago Bears, they had a one-game lead over the San Diego Chargers in the AFC West, but the loss at Soldier Field ended their season, losing the tiebreakers for the division and wild card berths.

Prior to this season, ownership changed in February; coaching and front office changes were made in March.

== NFL draft ==
1981 Denver Broncos draft
Round	Pick	Player	Position	College	Notes
1	15	Dennis Smith *	S	USC	
2	42	Clay Brown	TE	BYU	
4	106	Mark Herrmann	QB	Purdue	
5	125	Ken Lanier	T	Florida State	
6	151	Alvin Lewis	RB	Colorado State	
7	181	Steve Busick	LB	USC	
9	234	Rusty Olsen	DE	Washington	
11	290	Pat Walker	WR	Miami (FL)	
12	317	John Hankerd	LB	Notre Dame	
12	321	Mandel Robinson	RB	Wyoming	
Made roster † Pro Football Hall of Fame * Made at least one Pro Bowl during career

== Personnel ==
=== Staff ===
1981 Denver Broncos staff
Front office: Owner – Edgar Kaiser; General Manager – Grady Alderman; Director of Player Personnel – John Beake; Director of Scouting – Carroll Hardy; Head coaches: Head Coach – Dan Reeves; Special Assistant – Nick Nicolau; Offensive coaches: Running Backs – Charlie Lee; Wide Receivers – Rod Dowhower; Tight Ends – Fran Polsfoot; Offensive Line – Jerry Frei	Defensive coaches: Defensive Coordinator – Joe Collier; Defensive Line – Stan Jones; Linebackers – Bob Zeman; Defensive Backs – Richie McCabe; Special teams coaches: Special Teams – Reed Johnson

=== Roster ===
1981 Denver Broncos roster
Quarterbacks (QB): 17 Steve DeBerg; 10 Mark Herrmann; 7 Craig Morton; Running backs (RB): 35 Larry Canada; 41 Rob Lytle; 24 Rick Parros; 46 Dave Preston; 32 Tony Reed; Wide receivers (WR): 83 Wade Manning; 25 Haven Moses; 80 Rick Upchurch; 81 Steve Watson; Tight ends (TE): 85 Ron Egloff; 88 Riley Odoms; 87 James Wright	Offensive linemen (OL): 64 Billy Bryan C; 73 Kelvin Clark T; 62 Tom Glassic G; 65 Glenn Hyde C/G; 60 Paul Howard G; 76 Ken Lanier T; 71 Claudie Minor T; 70 Dave Studdard T; Defensive linemen (DL): 77 Greg Boyd DE; 68 Rubin Carter NT; 79 Barney Chavous DE; 75 Rulon Jones DE; 72 Don Latimer NT; 66 Brison Manor DE	Linebackers (LB): 58 Steve Busick ILB; 56 Larry Evans ILB; 53 Randy Gradishar ILB; 57 Tom Jackson OLB; 59 Mark Merrill ILB; 50 Jim Ryan OLB; 51 Bob Swenson OLB; Defensive backs (DB): 43 Steve Foley FS; 31 Mike Harden FS; 22 Aaron Kyle CB; 49 Dennis Smith CB; 39 Roland Solomon CB; 36 Bill Thompson SS; 37 Steve Trimble CB; Special teams (ST): 11 Luke Prestridge P; 19 Fred Steinfort K	Practice squad: None - Vacant; Reserve: 82 Amp Arnold WR (IR); 54 Keith Bishop G (IR); 55 Matt Braswell C/G (IR); 89 Clay Brown TE (IR); 52 Tom Davis C (IR); 84 Jimmy Robinson WR (IR); 45 Perry Smith CB (IR); 20 Louis Wright CB (IR); Rookies in italics 45 active, 8 reserve, 0 practice squad

== Preseason ==
=== Schedule ===
Week	Date	Opponent	Result	Record	Venue	Attendance
1	August 7	New York Jets	L 7–33	0–1	Mile High Stadium	63,644
2	August 15	at Miami Dolphins	L 14–24	0–2	Miami Orange Bowl	41,502
3	August 22	Green Bay Packers	W 17–7	1–2	Mile High Stadium	72,450
4	August 29	at Cincinnati Bengals	W 24–20	2–2	Riverfront Stadium	41,713

== Regular season ==
=== Schedule ===
Week	Date	Opponent	Result	Record	Venue	Attendance
1	September 6	**Oakland Raiders**	**W** 9–7	1–0	Mile High Stadium	74,796
2	September 13	at **Seattle Seahawks**	**L** 10–13	1–1	Kingdome	58,513
3	September 20	Baltimore Colts	**W** 28–10	2–1	Mile High Stadium	74,804
4	September 27	**San Diego Chargers**	**W** 42–24	3–1	Mile High Stadium	74,822
5	October 4	at **Oakland Raiders**	**W** 17–0	4–1	Oakland–Alameda County Coliseum	51,035
6	October 11	Detroit Lions	**W** 27–21	5–1	Mile High Stadium	74,816
7	October 18	at **Kansas City Chiefs**	**L** 14–28	5–2	Arrowhead Stadium	74,672
8	October 25	at Buffalo Bills	**L** 7–9	5–3	Rich Stadium	77,757
9	November 2	Minnesota Vikings	**W** 19–17	6–3	Mile High Stadium	74,834
10	November 8	Cleveland Browns	**W** 23–20 (OT)	7–3	Mile High Stadium	74,859
11	November 15	at Tampa Bay Buccaneers	**W** 24–7	8–3	Tampa Stadium	64,518
12	November 22	at Cincinnati Bengals	**L** 21–38	8–4	Riverfront Stadium	57,207
13	November 29	at **San Diego Chargers**	**L** 17–34	8–5	Jack Murphy Stadium	51,533
14	December 6	**Kansas City Chiefs**	**W** 16–13	9–5	Mile High Stadium	74,744
15	December 13	**Seattle Seahawks**	**W** 23–13	10–5	Mile High Stadium	74,527
16	December 20	at Chicago Bears	**L** 24–35	10–6	Soldier Field	40,125
Note: Intra-division opponents are in **bold** text.

=== Game summaries ===
==== Week 1 (Sunday, September 6, 1981): vs. Oakland Raiders ====
Week 1: Oakland Raiders at Denver Broncos – Game summary

Quarter	1	2	3	4	Total
Raiders	7	0	0	0	**7**
**Broncos**	6	3	0	0	**9**

at Mile High Stadium • Denver, Colorado

- Date: September 6
- Game time: 2:00 p.m. MDT
- Game attendance: 74,796
- Referee: Jerry Markbreit
- TV announcers (NBC): Charlie Jones (play–by–play) and Len Dawson (color commentator)

Team	Category	Player	Statistics
OAK	Passing		
OAK	Rushing		
OAK	Receiving		
DEN	Passing		
DEN	Rushing		
DEN	Receiving		

Scoring summary

Quarter	Time	Drive			Team	Scoring information	Score	
Quarter	Time	Plays	Yards	TOP	Team	Scoring information	OAK	DEN
1					Raiders	Chester 9-yard touchdown reception from Plunkett, Bahr kick good	7	0
1					Broncos	Upchurch 44-yard touchdown reception from Morton, Morton kick no good (pass failed)	7	6
2					Broncos	29-yard field goal by Steinfort	7	9
"TOP" = time of possession. For other American football terms, see Glossary of American football.							7	9

- Point spread:
- Over/under:
- Time of game:

Raiders	Game statistics	Broncos
	First downs	
	Rushes–yards	
	Passing yards	
	Passes	
	Sacked–yards	
	Net passing yards	
	Total yards	
	Return yards	
	Punts	
	Fumbles–lost	
	Penalties–yards	
	Time of possession	

Individual stats

==== Week 2 (Sunday, September 13, 1981): at Seattle Seahawks ====
Week 2: Denver Broncos at Seattle Seahawks – Game summary

Quarter	1	2	3	4	Total
Broncos	3	7	0	0	**10**
**Seahawks**	7	3	3	0	**13**

at Kingdome • Seattle, Washington

- Date: September 13
- Game time: 2:00 p.m. MDT
- Game weather: indoors (dome)
- Game attendance: 58,513
- Referee: Fred Silva
- TV announcers (NBC): Bob Costas (play–by–play) and Jim Turner (color commentator)

Team	Category	Player	Statistics
DEN	Passing		
DEN	Rushing		
DEN	Receiving		
SEA	Passing		
SEA	Rushing		
SEA	Receiving		

Scoring summary

Quarter	Time	Drive			Team	Scoring information	Score	
Quarter	Time	Plays	Yards	TOP	Team	Scoring information	DEN	SEA
1					Broncos	30-yard field goal by Steinfort	3	0
4					Seahawks	Boyd 3-yard touchdown reception from Zorn, Herrera kick good	3	7
2					Seahawks	43-yard field goal by Herrera	3	10
2					Broncos	Odoms 11-yard touchdown reception from Morton, Steinfort kick good	10	10
3					Seahawks	22-yard field goal by Herrera	10	13
"TOP" = time of possession. For other American football terms, see Glossary of American football.							10	13

- Point spread:
- Over/under:
- Time of game:

Broncos	Game statistics	Seahawks
	First downs	
	Rushes–yards	
	Passing yards	
	Passes	
	Sacked–yards	
	Net passing yards	
	Total yards	
	Return yards	
	Punts	
	Fumbles–lost	
	Penalties–yards	
	Time of possession	

Individual stats

==== Week 3 (Sunday, September 20, 1981): vs. Baltimore Colts ====
Week 3: Baltimore Colts at Denver Broncos – Game summary

Quarter	1	2	3	4	Total
Colts	0	0	10	0	**10**
**Broncos**	0	14	14	0	**28**

at Mile High Stadium • Denver, Colorado

- Date: September 20
- Game time: 2:00 p.m. MST
- Game attendance: 74,804
- Referee: Chuck Heberling
- TV announcers (NBC): Marv Albert (play–by–play) and Jim Turner (color commentator)

Team	Category	Player	Statistics
BAL	Passing		
BAL	Rushing		
BAL	Receiving		
DEN	Passing		
DEN	Rushing		
DEN	Receiving		

Scoring summary

Quarter	Time	Drive			Team	Scoring information	Score	
Quarter	Time	Plays	Yards	TOP	Team	Scoring information	BAL	DEN
2					Broncos	Egloff 7-yard touchdown reception from Morton, Steinfort kick good	0	7
2					Broncos	Watson 29-yard touchdown reception from Morton, Steinfort kick good	0	14
3					Colts	21-yard field goal by Wood	3	14
3					Colts	Dickey 63-yard touchdown run, Wood kick good	10	14
3					Broncos	Watson 18-yard touchdown reception from Morton, Steinfort kick good	10	21
3					Broncos	Watson 48-yard touchdown reception from Morton, Steinfort kick good	10	28
"TOP" = time of possession. For other American football terms, see Glossary of American football.							10	28

- Point spread:
- Over/under:
- Time of game:

Colts	Game statistics	Broncos
	First downs	
	Rushes–yards	
	Passing yards	
	Passes	
	Sacked–yards	
	Net passing yards	
	Total yards	
	Return yards	
	Punts	
	Fumbles–lost	
	Penalties–yards	
	Time of possession	

Individual stats

==== Week 4 (Sunday, September 27, 1981): vs. San Diego Chargers ====
Week 4: San Diego Chargers at Denver Broncos – Game summary

Quarter	1	2	3	4	Total
Chargers	0	0	10	14	**24**
**Broncos**	21	7	7	7	**42**

at Mile High Stadium • Denver, Colorado

- Date: September 27
- Game time: 2:00 p.m. MDT
- Game attendance: 74,822
- Referee: Jerry Seeman
- TV announcers (NBC): Don Criqui (play–by–play) and John Brodie (color commentator)

Team	Category	Player	Statistics
SD	Passing		
SD	Rushing		
SD	Receiving		
DEN	Passing		
DEN	Rushing		
DEN	Receiving		

Scoring summary

Quarter	Time	Drive			Team	Scoring information	Score	
Quarter	Time	Plays	Yards	TOP	Team	Scoring information	SD	DEN
1					Broncos	Odoms 19-yard touchdown reception from Morton, Steinfort kick good	0	7
1					Broncos	Watson 93-yard touchdown reception from Morton, Steinfort kick good	0	14
1					Broncos	J Wright 2-yard touchdown reception from Morton, Steinfort kick good	0	21
2					Broncos	Watson 21-yard touchdown reception from Morton, Steinfort kick good	0	28
3					Broncos	Preston 2-yard touchdown run, Steinfort kick good	0	35
3					Chargers	Smith 39-yard touchdown reception from Fouts, Benirschke kick good	7	35
3					Chargers	52-yard field goal by Benirschke	10	35
4					Chargers	Cappelletti 1-yard touchdown run, Benirschke kick good	17	35
4					Chargers	Winslow 1-yard touchdown reception from Fouts, Benirschke kick good	24	35
4					Broncos	Lytle 3-yard touchdown run, Steinfort kick good	24	42
"TOP" = time of possession. For other American football terms, see Glossary of American football.							24	42

- Point spread:
- Over/under:
- Time of game:

Chargers	Game statistics	Broncos
	First downs	
	Rushes–yards	
	Passing yards	
	Passes	
	Sacked–yards	
	Net passing yards	
	Total yards	
	Return yards	
	Punts	
	Fumbles–lost	
	Penalties–yards	
	Time of possession	

Individual stats

==== Week 5 (Sunday, October 4, 1981): at Oakland Raiders ====
Week 5: Denver Broncos at Oakland Raiders – Game summary

Quarter	1	2	3	4	Total
**Broncos**	0	7	10	0	**17**
Raiders	0	0	0	0	**0**

at Oakland–Alameda County Coliseum • Oakland, California

- Date: October 4
- Game time: 2:00 p.m. MDT
- Game attendance: 51,035
- Referee: Jim Tunney
- TV announcers (NBC): Charlie Jones (play–by–play) and Len Dawson (color commentator)

Team	Category	Player	Statistics
DEN	Passing		
DEN	Rushing		
DEN	Receiving		
OAK	Passing		
OAK	Rushing		
OAK	Receiving		

Scoring summary

Quarter	Time	Drive			Team	Scoring information	Score	
Quarter	Time	Plays	Yards	TOP	Team	Scoring information	DEN	OAK
2					Broncos	Preston 4-yard touchdown run, Steinfort kick good	7	0
3					Broncos	31-yard field goal by Steinfort	10	0
3					Broncos	Parros 20-yard touchdown run, Steinfort kick good	17	0
"TOP" = time of possession. For other American football terms, see Glossary of American football.							17	0

- Point spread:
- Over/under:
- Time of game:

Broncos	Game statistics	Raiders
	First downs	
	Rushes–yards	
	Passing yards	
	Passes	
	Sacked–yards	
	Net passing yards	
	Total yards	
	Return yards	
	Punts	
	Fumbles–lost	
	Penalties–yards	
	Time of possession	

Individual stats

==== Week 6 (Sunday, October 11, 1981): vs. Detroit Lions ====
Week 6: Detroit Lions at Denver Broncos – Game summary

Quarter	1	2	3	4	Total
Lions	7	14	0	0	**21**
**Broncos**	10	7	3	7	**27**

- Date: October 11
- Game time: 2:00 p.m. MDT
- Game attendance: 74,618
- Referee: Bob McElwee
- TV announcers (CBS): Frank Glieber (play–by–play) and John Dockery (color commentator)

Team	Category	Player	Statistics
DET	Passing		
DET	Rushing		
DET	Receiving		
DEN	Passing		
DEN	Rushing		
DEN	Receiving		

Scoring summary

Quarter	Time	Drive			Team	Scoring information	Score	
Quarter	Time	Plays	Yards	TOP	Team	Scoring information	DET	DEN
1					Broncos	Watson 95-yard touchdown reception from Morton, Steinfort kick good	0	7
1					Broncos	24-yard field goal by Steinfort	0	10
1					Lions	Sims 48-yard touchdown run, Murray kick good	7	10
2					Lions	Sims 1-yard touchdown run, Murray kick good	14	10
2					Broncos	Watson 40-yard touchdown reception from Morton, Steinfort kick good	14	17
2		—	—	—	Lions	Interception returned 60 yards for touchdown by Hall, Murray kick good	21	17
3					Broncos	24-yard field goal by Steinfort	21	20
4					Broncos	Parros 15-yard touchdown reception from Morton, Steinfort kick good	21	27
"TOP" = time of possession. For other American football terms, see Glossary of American football.							21	27

- Point spread:
- Over/under:
- Time of game:

Lions	Game statistics	Broncos
	First downs	
	Rushes–yards	
	Passing yards	
	Passes	
	Sacked–yards	
	Net passing yards	
	Total yards	
	Return yards	
	Punts	
	Fumbles–lost	
	Penalties–yards	
	Time of possession	

Individual stats

==== Week 7 (Sunday, October 18, 1981): at Kansas City Chiefs ====
Week 7: Denver Broncos at Kansas City Chiefs – Game summary

Quarter	1	2	3	4	Total
Broncos	0	0	7	7	**14**
**Chiefs**	14	0	0	14	**28**

at Arrowhead Stadium • Kansas City, Missouri

- Date: October 18
- Game time: 2:00 p.m. MDT
- Game attendance: 74,672
- Referee: Dick Jorgensen
- TV announcers (NBC): Bob Costas (play–by–play) and Bob Trumpy (color commentator)

Team	Category	Player	Statistics
DEN	Passing		
DEN	Rushing		
DEN	Receiving		
KC	Passing		
KC	Rushing		
KC	Receiving		

Scoring summary

Quarter	Time	Drive			Team	Scoring information	Score	
Quarter	Time	Plays	Yards	TOP	Team	Scoring information	DEN	KC
1					Chiefs	Jackson 1-yard touchdown run, Lowery kick good	0	7
1		—	—	—	Chiefs	Fumble recovery returned 47 yards for touchdown by Paul, Lowery kick good	0	14
3					Broncos	Watson 11-yard touchdown reception from Morton, Steinfort kick good	7	14
4					Chiefs	Marshall 64-yard touchdown reception from Kenney, Lowery kick good	7	21
4					Broncos	Watson 11-yard touchdown reception from Morton, Steinfort kick good	14	21
4					Chiefs	Delaney 82-yard touchdown run, Lowery kick good	14	28
"TOP" = time of possession. For other American football terms, see Glossary of American football.							14	28

- Point spread:
- Over/under:
- Time of game:

Broncos	Game statistics	Chiefs
	First downs	
	Rushes–yards	
	Passing yards	
	Passes	
	Sacked–yards	
	Net passing yards	
	Total yards	
	Return yards	
	Punts	
	Fumbles–lost	
	Penalties–yards	
	Time of possession	

Individual stats

==== Week 8 (Sunday, October 25, 1981): at Buffalo Bills ====
Week 8: Denver Broncos at Buffalo Bills – Game summary

Quarter	1	2	3	4	Total
Broncos	0	7	0	0	**7**
**Bills**	0	3	3	3	**9**

at Rich Stadium • Orchard Park, New York

- Date: October 25
- Game time: 11:00 a.m. MST
- Game attendance: 77,757
- Referee: Gene Barth
- TV announcers (NBC): Don Criqui (play–by–play) and John Brodie (color commentator)

Team	Category	Player	Statistics
DEN	Passing		
DEN	Rushing		
DEN	Receiving		
BUF	Passing		
BUF	Rushing		
BUF	Receiving		

Scoring summary

Quarter	Time	Drive			Team	Scoring information	Score	
Quarter	Time	Plays	Yards	TOP	Team	Scoring information	DEN	BUF
2					Broncos	Watson 36-yard touchdown reception from Morton, Steinfort kick good	7	0
2					Bills	41-yard field goal by Mike-Mayer	7	3
3					Bills	46-yard field goal by Mike-Mayer	7	6
4					Bills	36-yard field goal by Mike-Mayer	7	9
"TOP" = time of possession. For other American football terms, see Glossary of American football.							7	9

- Point spread:
- Over/under:
- Time of game:

Broncos	Game statistics	Bills
	First downs	
	Rushes–yards	
	Passing yards	
	Passes	
	Sacked–yards	
	Net passing yards	
	Total yards	
	Return yards	
	Punts	
	Fumbles–lost	
	Penalties–yards	
	Time of possession	

Individual stats

==== Week 9 (Monday, November 2, 1981): vs. Minnesota Vikings ====
Week 9: Minnesota Vikings at Denver Broncos – Game summary

Quarter	1	2	3	4	Total
Vikings	0	3	0	14	**17**
**Broncos**	0	3	3	13	**19**

at Mile High Stadium • Denver, Colorado

- Date: November 2
- Game time: 7:00 p.m. MST
- Game attendance: 74,834
- Referee: Fred Wyant
- TV announcers (ABC): Frank Gifford (play–by–play), Howard Cosell (color commentator) and Fran Tarkenton (color commentator)

Team	Category	Player	Statistics
MIN	Passing		
MIN	Rushing		
MIN	Receiving		
DEN	Passing		
DEN	Rushing		
DEN	Receiving		

Scoring summary

Quarter	Time	Drive			Team	Scoring information	Score	
Quarter	Time	Plays	Yards	TOP	Team	Scoring information	MIN	DEN
2					Broncos	42-yard field goal by Steinfort	0	3
2					Vikings	32-yard field goal by Danmeier	3	3
3					Broncos	49-yard field goal by Steinfort	3	6
4					Broncos	Lytle 5-yard touchdown run, Steinfort kick no good	3	12
4					Broncos	Watson 15-yard touchdown reception from Morton, Steinfort kick good	3	19
4					Vikings	Galbreath 1-yard touchdown run, Danmeier kick good	10	19
4					Vikings	Galbreath 1-yard touchdown run, Danmeier kick good	17	19
"TOP" = time of possession. For other American football terms, see Glossary of American football.							17	19

- Point spread:
- Over/under:
- Time of game:

Vikings	Game statistics	Broncos
	First downs	
	Rushes–yards	
	Passing yards	
	Passes	
	Sacked–yards	
	Net passing yards	
	Total yards	
	Return yards	
	Punts	
	Fumbles–lost	
	Penalties–yards	
	Time of possession	

Individual stats

==== Week 10 (Sunday, November 8, 1981): vs. Cleveland Browns ====
Week 10: Cleveland Browns at Denver Broncos – Game summary

Quarter	1	2	3	4	OT	Total
Browns	0	7	7	6	0	**20**
**Broncos**	3	7	3	7	3	**23**

at Mile High Stadium • Denver, Colorado

- Date: November 8
- Game time: 2:00 p.m. MST
- Game attendance: 74,859
- Referee: Jerry Seeman
- TV announcers (NBC): Don Criqui (play–by–play) and John Brodie (color commentator)

Team	Category	Player	Statistics
CLE	Passing		
CLE	Rushing		
CLE	Receiving		
DEN	Passing		
DEN	Rushing		
DEN	Receiving		

Scoring summary

Quarter	Time	Drive			Team	Scoring information	Score	
Quarter	Time	Plays	Yards	TOP	Team	Scoring information	CLE	DEN
1					Broncos	45-yard field goal by Steinfort	0	3
2					Browns	Miller 1-yard touchdown run, Bahr kick good	7	3
2					Broncos	Watson 5-yard touchdown reception from Morton, Steinfort kick good	7	10
3					Broncos	43-yard field goal by Steinfort	7	13
3					Browns	Logan 23-yard touchdown reception from Sipe, Bahr kick good	14	13
4					Broncos	Preston 4-yard touchdown run, Steinfort kick good	14	20
4					Browns	27-yard field goal by Bahr	17	20
4					Browns	32-yard field goal by Bahr	20	20
OT					Broncos	30-yard field goal by Steinfort	20	23
"TOP" = time of possession. For other American football terms, see Glossary of American football.							20	23

- Point spread:
- Over/under:
- Time of game:

Browns	Game statistics	Broncos
	First downs	
	Rushes–yards	
	Passing yards	
	Passes	
	Sacked–yards	
	Net passing yards	
	Total yards	
	Return yards	
	Punts	
	Fumbles–lost	
	Penalties–yards	
	Time of possession	

Individual stats

==== Week 11 (Sunday, November 15, 1981): at Tampa Bay Buccaneers ====
Week 11: Denver Broncos at Tampa Bay Buccaneers – Game summary

Quarter	1	2	3	4	Total
**Broncos**	7	0	7	10	**24**
Buccaneers	0	0	7	0	**7**

at Tampa Stadium • Tampa, Florida

- Date: November 15
- Game time: 11:02 a.m. MST
- Game attendance: 64,518
- Referee: Jim Tunney
- TV announcers (NBC): Merle Harmon (play–by–play) and George Kunz (color commentator)

Team	Category	Player	Statistics
DEN	Passing		
DEN	Rushing		
DEN	Receiving		
TB	Passing		
TB	Rushing		
TB	Receiving		

Scoring summary

Quarter	Time	Drive			Team	Scoring information	Score	
Quarter	Time	Plays	Yards	TOP	Team	Scoring information	DEN	TB
1	4:04	10	45		Broncos	Odoms 12-yard touchdown reception from Morton, Steinfort kick good	7	0
3	13:53	—	—	—	Buccaneers	Interception returned 40 yards for touchdown by Brown, Capece kick good	7	7
3	7:22	13	80		Broncos	Canada 1-yard touchdown run, Steinfort kick good	14	7
4	13:33	13	60		Broncos	Canada 3-yard touchdown reception from DeBerg, Steinfort kick good	21	7
4	11:01	4	3		Broncos	31-yard field goal by Steinfort	24	7
"TOP" = time of possession. For other American football terms, see Glossary of American football.							24	7

- Point spread:
- Over/under:
- Time of game: 2 hours, 45 minutes

Broncos	Game statistics	Buccaneers
	First downs	
	Rushes–yards	
	Passing yards	
	Passes	
	Sacked–yards	
	Net passing yards	
	Total yards	
	Return yards	
	Punts	
	Fumbles–lost	
	Penalties–yards	
	Time of possession	

Individual stats

==== Week 12 (Sunday, November 22, 1981): at Cincinnati Bengals ====
Week 12: Denver Broncos at Cincinnati Bengals – Game summary

Quarter	1	2	3	4	Total
Broncos	0	7	0	14	**21**
**Bengals**	14	14	0	10	**38**

at Riverfront Stadium • Cincinnati, Ohio

- Date: November 22
- Game time: 11:00 a.m. MST
- Game attendance: 57,207
- Referee: Jerry Markbreit
- TV announcers (NBC): Bob Costas (play–by–play) and Gene Washington (color commentator)

Team	Category	Player	Statistics
DEN	Passing		
DEN	Rushing		
DEN	Receiving		
CIN	Passing		
CIN	Rushing		
CIN	Receiving		

Scoring summary

Quarter	Time	Drive			Team	Scoring information	Score	
Quarter	Time	Plays	Yards	TOP	Team	Scoring information	DEN	CIN
1					Bengals	Johnson 39-yard touchdown run, Breech kick good	0	7
1					Bengals	Johnson 2-yard touchdown reception from Anderson, Breech kick good	0	14
2					Broncos	Lytle 5-yard touchdown run, Steinfort kick good	7	14
2					Bengals	Anderson 2-yard touchdown run, Breech kick good	7	21
2					Bengals	Collinsworth 7-yard touchdown reception from Anderson, Breech kick good	7	28
4					Bengals	38-yard field goal by Breech	7	31
4					Broncos	Watson 14-yard touchdown reception from DeBerg, Steinfort kick good	14	31
4					Bengals	Alexander 65-yard touchdown reception from Anderson, Breech kick good	14	38
4					Broncos	Lytle 14-yard touchdown reception from DeBerg, Steinfort kick good	21	38
"TOP" = time of possession. For other American football terms, see Glossary of American football.							21	38

- Point spread:
- Over/under:
- Time of game:

Broncos	Game statistics	Bengals
	First downs	
	Rushes–yards	
	Passing yards	
	Passes	
	Sacked–yards	
	Net passing yards	
	Total yards	
	Return yards	
	Punts	
	Fumbles–lost	
	Penalties–yards	
	Time of possession	

Individual stats

==== Week 13 (Sunday, November 29, 1981): at San Diego Chargers ====
Week 13: Denver Broncos at San Diego Chargers – Game summary

Quarter	1	2	3	4	Total
Broncos	0	10	0	7	**17**
**Chargers**	14	13	7	0	**34**

at Jack Murphy Stadium • San Diego, California

- Date: November 29
- Game time: 2:00 p.m. MST
- Game attendance: 51,533
- Referee: Bob McElwee
- TV announcers (NBC): Phil Stone (play–by–play) and John Brodie (color commentator)

Team	Category	Player	Statistics
DEN	Passing		
DEN	Rushing		
DEN	Receiving		
SD	Passing		
SD	Rushing		
SD	Receiving		

Scoring summary

Quarter	Time	Drive			Team	Scoring information	Score	
Quarter	Time	Plays	Yards	TOP	Team	Scoring information	DEN	SD
1					Chargers	Muncie 14-yard touchdown run, Benirschke kick good	0	7
1					Chargers	Muncie 1-yard touchdown run, Benirschke kick good	0	14
2					Broncos	Canada 4-yard touchdown run, Steinfort kick good	7	14
2					Chargers	Muncie 4-yard touchdown run, Benirschke kick good	7	20
2					Broncos	21-yard field goal by Steinfort	10	20
2					Chargers	Muncie 3-yard touchdown run, Benirschke kick good	10	27
3					Chargers	Sievers 1-yard touchdown reception from Fouts, Benirschke kick good	10	34
4					Broncos	Moses 10-yard touchdown reception from DeBerg, Steinfort kick good	17	34
"TOP" = time of possession. For other American football terms, see Glossary of American football.							17	34

- Point spread:
- Over/under:
- Time of game:

Broncos	Game statistics	Chargers
	First downs	
	Rushes–yards	
	Passing yards	
	Passes	
	Sacked–yards	
	Net passing yards	
	Total yards	
	Return yards	
	Punts	
	Fumbles–lost	
	Penalties–yards	
	Time of possession	

Individual stats

==== Week 14 (Sunday, December 6, 1981): vs. Kansas City Chiefs ====
Week 14: Kansas City Chiefs at Denver Broncos – Game summary

Quarter	1	2	3	4	Total
Chiefs	0	6	7	0	**13**
**Broncos**	7	9	0	0	**16**

at Mile High Stadium • Denver, Colorado

- Date: December 6
- Game time: 2:00 p.m. MST
- Game attendance: 74,744
- Referee: Red Cashion
- TV announcers (NBC): Don Criqui (play–by–play) and John Brodie (color commentator)

Team	Category	Player	Statistics
KC	Passing		
KC	Rushing		
KC	Receiving		
DEN	Passing		
DEN	Rushing		
DEN	Receiving		

Scoring summary

Quarter	Time	Drive			Team	Scoring information	Score	
Quarter	Time	Plays	Yards	TOP	Team	Scoring information	KC	DEN
1					Broncos	Lytle 2-yard touchdown run, Steinfort kick good	0	7
2					Broncos	21-yard field goal by Steinfort	0	10
2					Broncos	Canada 2-yard touchdown run, Steinfort kick no good	0	16
2					Chiefs	43-yard field goal by Lowery	3	16
2					Chiefs	45-yard field goal by Lowery	6	16
3					Chiefs	Hadnot 1-yard touchdown run, Lowery kick good	13	16
"TOP" = time of possession. For other American football terms, see Glossary of American football.							13	16

- Point spread:
- Over/under:
- Time of game:

Chiefs	Game statistics	Broncos
	First downs	
	Rushes–yards	
	Passing yards	
	Passes	
	Sacked–yards	
	Net passing yards	
	Total yards	
	Return yards	
	Punts	
	Fumbles–lost	
	Penalties–yards	
	Time of possession	

Individual stats

==== Week 15 (Sunday, December 13, 1981): vs. Seattle Seahawks ====
Week 15: Seattle Seahawks at Denver Broncos – Game summary

Quarter	1	2	3	4	Total
Seahawks	0	3	3	7	**13**
**Broncos**	7	3	6	7	**23**

at Mile High Stadium • Denver, Colorado

- Date: December 13
- Game time: 2:00 p.m. MST
- Game attendance: 74,527
- Referee: Fred Wyant
- TV announcers (NBC): Jay Randolph (play–by–play) and Jim Turner (color commentator)

Team	Category	Player	Statistics
SEA	Passing		
SEA	Rushing		
SEA	Receiving		
DEN	Passing		
DEN	Rushing		
DEN	Receiving		

Scoring summary

Quarter	Time	Drive			Team	Scoring information	Score	
Quarter	Time	Plays	Yards	TOP	Team	Scoring information	SEA	DEN
1					Broncos	Odoms 22-yard touchdown reception from Morton, Steinfort kick good	0	7
2					Seahawks	28-yard field goal by Alvarez	3	7
2					Broncos	33-yard field goal by Steinfort	3	10
3					Broncos	43-yard field goal by Steinfort	3	13
3					Broncos	24-yard field goal by Steinfort	3	16
3					Seahawks	20-yard field goal by Alvarez	6	16
4					Broncos	Parros 8-yard touchdown run, Steinfort kick good	6	23
4					Seahawks	Hughes 5-yard touchdown reception from Krieg, Alvarez kick good	13	23
"TOP" = time of possession. For other American football terms, see Glossary of American football.							13	23

- Point spread:
- Over/under:
- Time of game:

Seahawks	Game statistics	Broncos
	First downs	
	Rushes–yards	
	Passing yards	
	Passes	
	Sacked–yards	
	Net passing yards	
	Total yards	
	Return yards	
	Punts	
	Fumbles–lost	
	Penalties–yards	
	Time of possession	

Individual stats

==== Week 16 (Sunday, December 20, 1981); at Chicago Bears ====
Week 16: Denver Broncos at Chicago Bears – Game summary

Quarter	1	2	3	4	Total
Broncos (10–6)	3	0	14	7	**24**
**Bears** (6–10)	0	14	14	7	**35**

at Soldier Field • Chicago, Illinois

- Date: December 20
- Game time: 11:00 a.m. MST
- Game attendance: 40,125
- Referee: Gordon McCarter
- TV announcers (NBC): Bob Costas (play–by–play) and Bob Trumpy (color commentator)

Team	Category	Player	Statistics
DEN	Passing		
DEN	Rushing		
DEN	Receiving		
CHI	Passing		
CHI	Rushing		
CHI	Receiving		

Scoring summary

Quarter	Time	Drive			Team	Scoring information	Score	
Quarter	Time	Plays	Yards	TOP	Team	Scoring information	DEN	CHI
1					Broncos	46-yard field goal by Steinfort	3	0
2					Bears	Payton 19-yard touchdown reception from Evans, Roveto kick good	3	7
2					Bears	Harper 4-yard touchdown run, Roveto kick good	3	14
3		—	—	—	Bears	Interception returned 69 yards for touchdown by Fencik, Roveto kick good	3	21
3					Broncos	Odoms 6-yard touchdown reception from Morton, Steinfort kick good	10	21
3		—	—	—	Bears	Interception returned 44 yards for touchdown by Harris, Roveto kick good	10	28
3					Broncos	Upchurch 25-yard touchdown reception from DeBerg, Steinfort kick good	17	28
4					Bears	Payton 25-yard touchdown reception from Evans, Roveto kick good	17	35
4					Broncos	Upchurch 39-yard touchdown reception from DeBerg, Steinfort kick good	24	35
"TOP" = time of possession. For other American football terms, see Glossary of American football.							24	35

- Point spread:
- Over/under:
- Time of game:

Broncos	Game statistics	Bears
	First downs	
	Rushes–yards	
	Passing yards	
	Passes	
	Sacked–yards	
	Net passing yards	
	Total yards	
	Return yards	
	Punts	
	Fumbles–lost	
	Penalties–yards	
	Time of possession	

Individual stats

=== Standings ===
AFC West
	W	L	T	PCT	DIV	CONF	PF	PA	STK
^{(3)} San Diego Chargers	10	6	0	.625	6–2	8–4	478	390	W2
Denver Broncos	10	6	0	.625	5–3	7–5	321	289	L1
Kansas City Chiefs	9	7	0	.563	5–3	7–5	343	290	W1
Oakland Raiders	7	9	0	.438	2–6	5–7	273	343	L2
Seattle Seahawks	6	10	0	.375	2–6	6–8	322	388	W1
