= Todd Thomas (American football) =

American football player (1959–2000)

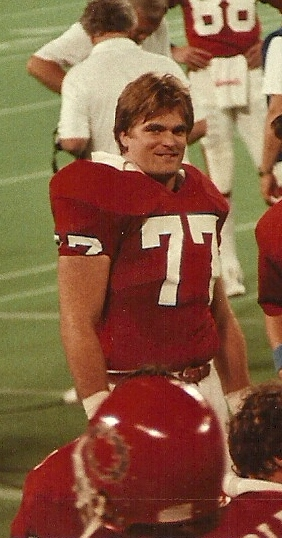
- Thomas with the New Jersey Generals in 1983

No. 62, 77, 74, 61
- Positions: Long snapper, center, offensive tackle

Personal information
- Born: December 2, 1959; Mankato, Minnesota, U.S.
- Died: March 5, 2000 (aged 40); Houston, Texas, U.S.
- Listed height: 6 ft 6 in (1.98 m)
- Listed weight: 284 lb (129 kg)

Career information
- High school: Cedarburg (Cedarburg, Wisconsin)
- College: North Dakota (1977–1980)
- NFL draft: 1981: 5th round, 124th overall pick

Career history
- Kansas City Chiefs (1981); New Jersey Generals (1983); Arizona Wranglers (1984); Pittsburgh Maulers (1984); Philadelphia Eagles (1984)

Career NFL statistics
- Games played: 15
- Stats at Pro Football Reference

Todd Robin Thomas (December 2, 1959 – March 5, 2000) was an American professional football long snapper, center and offensive tackle. He played college football at University of North Dakota and was selected by the Kansas City Chiefs in the fifth round of the 1981 NFL draft.

== Early life ==
Thomas graduated from Cedarburg High School in 1977 and was a letterman in football, baseball, and basketball. In football, he was a tackle as well as the team's long snapper. On February 15, 2014, he was inducted into the Cedarburg High School Athletic Hall of Fame.

== College career ==
He played tackle at North Dakota and also served as the long snapper. In 1981, he graduated with a degree in chemical engineering. He was inducted into the University of North Dakota Letterwinners Association Hall of Fame in 2000.

== Professional career ==
=== Kansas City Chiefs ===
The Kansas City Chiefs selected Thomas in the fifth round (124th overall) in the 1981 NFL draft. He played in 15 regular season games for the 1981 Chiefs as their long snapper. During a game against the Miami Dolphins on December 13, Thomas suffered a dislocated shoulder. He was placed on injured reserve on December 15 through the remainder of the 1981 season. On September 6, 1982, the Chiefs released him.

=== United States Football League ===
Thomas signed with the New Jersey Generals of the United States Football League (USFL) on October 15, 1982. He started in 11 games and played in all 18 games during their 1983 inaugural season and was frequently used as a blocking tight end. On February 14, 1984, the New Jersey Generals traded Thomas to the Arizona Wranglers for linebacker Don Goode. Thomas played in ten games for the Wranglers as a tackle / tight end and then was released on May 18, 1984. The Pittsburgh Maulers of the USFL claimed Thomas off waivers from the Arizona Wranglers on May 18, 1984. He played tackle.

=== Philadelphia Eagles ===
After two seasons in the USFL, Thomas returned to the National Football League in July 1984 as a center / guard with the Philadelphia Eagles. On August 14, 1984, he was placed on injured reserve with a herniated disc. He remained on injured reserve for the entire 1984 season, and then retired from football due to his back injury.

== Later life and death ==
After ending his football career Thomas utilized his background in chemical engineering, eventually earning seven patents. Moreover, Thomas was considered an expert in under balanced drilling techniques. Thomas died from lung cancer on March 5, 2000 at the age of 40. That same year, he was inducted into the University of North Dakota Hall of Fame.
