= Roger Taylor (American football) =

American gridiron football player (born 1958)

No. 51, 76
- Position: Offensive tackle

Personal information
- Born: January 5, 1958 (age 68); Shawnee, Oklahoma, U.S.
- Listed height: 6 ft 6 in (1.98 m)
- Listed weight: 271 lb (123 kg)

Career information
- High school: Star Spencer (Oklahoma City, Oklahoma)
- College: Oklahoma State
- NFL draft: 1981: 3rd round, 75th overall pick

Career history
- Kansas City Chiefs (1981); Winnipeg Blue Bombers (1982); Buffalo Bills (1983); New Orleans Saints (1985)*
- * Offseason or practice squad member only

Career NFL statistics
- Games played: 13
- Stats at Pro Football Reference

Roger Wayne Taylor (born January 5, 1958) is an American former professional football player who was an offensive tackle in the National Football League (NFL). Taylor was selected by the Kansas City Chiefs in the third round (75th overall) out of Oklahoma State University in the 1981 NFL draft.

== Professional career ==
=== Kansas City Chiefs ===
The Kansas City Chiefs obtained Taylor 75th overall in the third round of the 1981 NFL draft as the result of a draft-day trade that sent running back Tony Reed to the Denver Broncos in exchange for the 75th pick of the 1981 NFL draft (Roger Taylor) and a 4th round pick in the 1982 NFL draft (Stuart Anderson). Taylor would go on to play in 13 regular season games for the Chiefs during their 1981 season.

In 1982 Taylor attended the Chiefs' training camp, but was released as part of the final cuts on September 6, 1982. As fate would have it, the other players connected to the 1981 draft-day trade were released that day as well, Stuart Anderson by the Chiefs and Tony Reed by the Broncos.

=== Winnipeg Blue Bombers ===
After being released by the Kansas City Chiefs, Taylor played for the Winnipeg Blue Bombers during the 1982 season. During his time with the Blue Bombers Taylor would wear jersey number 51.

=== Buffalo Bills ===
As a free agent, he was signed by the Buffalo Bills in 1983 and on the second day of training camp he injured his knee. He spent the entire year on the injured reserve list and did not play in any pre-season or regular season games for the Bills during their 1983 season.

=== New Orleans Saints ===
The New Orleans Saints released him on July 31, 1985.

=== Professional career statistics ===
Season	Team	G	GS
1981	Kansas City Chiefs	13	0
1982	Winnipeg Blue Bombers	4	0
1983	Buffalo Bills	Injured-reserve	
Total		17	0
