= Brian Flones =

American football player (born 1959)

No. 50
- Position: Linebacker

Personal information
- Born: September 1, 1959 (age 67); Mount Vernon, Washington, U.S.
- Listed height: 6 ft 1 in (1.85 m)
- Listed weight: 228 lb (103 kg)

Career information
- High school: Burlington (WA) Edison
- College: Washington State
- NFL draft: 1981: undrafted

Career history
- Seattle Seahawks (1981–1983)
- Stats at Pro Football Reference

Brian Flones (born September 1, 1959) is an American former professional football player who was a linebacker for the Seattle Seahawks of the National Football League (NFL) from 1981 to 1982. He played college football for the Washington State Cougars in Pullman.

Undersized, Flones walked on as a college freshman in 1977 out of Burlington-Edison High School, and was a team captain of the Cougars as a senior in 1980.
