= Sam McCullum =

American football player (born 1952)

No. 80, 84
- Position: Wide receiver

Personal information
- Born: November 30, 1952 (age 73); McComb, Mississippi, U.S.
- Listed height: 6 ft 2 in (1.88 m)
- Listed weight: 203 lb (92 kg)

Career information
- High school: Flathead (Kalispell, Montana)
- College: Montana State
- NFL draft: 1974: 9th round, 232nd overall pick

Career history
- Minnesota Vikings (1974–1975); Seattle Seahawks (1976–1981); Minnesota Vikings (1982–1983)

Career NFL statistics
- Receptions: 274
- Receiving yards: 4,017
- Receiving touchdowns: 26
- Stats at Pro Football Reference

Samuel Charles McCullum (born November 30, 1952) is an American former professional football player who played wide receiver for 10 seasons in the National Football League (NFL) for the Seattle Seahawks and Minnesota Vikings from 1974 through 1983.

== Early life ==
Born in McComb, Mississippi, McCullum moved with his family to Montana in 1967, and was raised in Kalispell. He attended Flathead High School, and was all-state in football, basketball, and track. He then attended Montana State University in Bozeman, where he played football for the Bobcats from 1970–1973, and set a record of 16 career touchdown catches.

== Professional career ==
McCullum was selected 232nd overall by the Minnesota Vikings in ninth round of the 1974 NFL draft. He played wide receiver for ten seasons for the Vikings and expansion Seattle Seahawks from 1974 through 1983.

McCullum finished his NFL career with 274 receptions for 4,017 yards, and 26 touchdowns.

The NLRB found that the Seahawks illegally discharged McCullum as a result of his participation in the 1982 NFL strike. In 1991, McCullum was awarded $543,000 in backpay.

== NFL career statistics ==
Legend
**Bold**	Career high

Year	Team	Games		Receiving				
Year	Team	GP	GS	Rec	Yds	Avg	Lng	TD
1974	MIN	12	0	7	138	19.7	34	3
1975	MIN	9	0	2	25	12.5	20	0
1976	SEA	14	13	32	506	15.8	**72**	4
1977	SEA	13	3	9	198	**22.0**	65	1
1978	SEA	**16**	**16**	37	525	14.2	44	3
1979	SEA	**16**	**16**	46	739	16.1	65	4
1980	SEA	**16**	**16**	**62**	**874**	14.1	58	**6**
1981	SEA	**16**	14	46	567	12.3	36	3
1982	MIN	6	2	12	131	10.9	21	0
1983	MIN	11	6	21	314	15.0	49	2
		129	86	274	4,017	14.7	72	26

== Halls of fame ==
In 1993, McCullum was inducted into the Montana State Hall of Fame, in 2011 he was inducted into the Kalispell Legends Wall of Fame, and in 2018 he was inducted into the Montana Football Hall of Fame.

== Personal life ==
McCullum is Jewish, having converted to Judaism. He and his wife live in the Seattle area, and have two sons, Jamien and Justin.

== See also ==
- List of select Jewish football players
