= Theotis Brown =

American football player (born 1957)

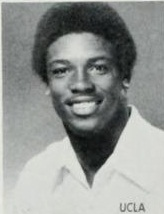

No. 33, 30, 27
- Position: Running back

Personal information
- Born: April 20, 1957 (age 69); Chicago, IL, U.S.
- Listed height: 6 ft 2 in (1.88 m)
- Listed weight: 225 lb (102 kg)

Career information
- High school: Skyline (Oakland, California)
- College: UCLA
- NFL draft: 1979: 2nd round, 35th overall pick

Career history
- St. Louis Cardinals (1979–1981); Seattle Seahawks (1981-1983); Kansas City Chiefs (1983-1984)

Awards and highlights
- 2× First-team All-Pac-10 (1976, 1978)

Career NFL statistics
- Rushing yards: 2,046
- Rushing average: 3.7
- Rushing touchdowns: 30
- Stats at Pro Football Reference

Theotis Brown II (born April 20, 1957) is an American former professional football player who was a running back for six seasons in the National Football League (NFL). He played college football for the UCLA Bruins before playing in the NFL for the St. Louis Cardinals, Seattle Seahawks, and Kansas City Chiefs. His football career was ended by a heart attack at age 27.

Brown was raised in Oakland, California, where he attended Skyline High School (Oakland, California). His locker mate during high school was the Academy Award-winning actor, Tom Hanks. Aside from football, Brown also played baseball at Skyline.

Nicknamed "Big Foot" and "Chocolate Thunder", Brown rushed for 2,914 yards (No. 7 all-time) for the Bruins at the University of California, Los Angeles, from 1976 to 1978. He is the father of former UCLA cornerback Theotis "Trey" Brown, III. Brown has one daughter, Taylor.

On November 4, 2011, Brown was inducted into the UCLA Athletics Hall of Fame.
