= Joe Delaney =

American football player (1958–1983)

No. 37
- Position: Running back

Personal information
- Born: October 30, 1958; Henderson, Texas, U.S.
- Died: June 29, 1983 (age 24); Monroe, Louisiana, U.S.
- Listed height: 5 ft 10 in (1.78 m)
- Listed weight: 184 lb (83 kg)

Career information
- High school: Haughton (Haughton, Louisiana)
- College: Northwestern State
- NFL draft: 1981: 2nd round, 41st overall pick

Career history
- Kansas City Chiefs (1981–1982)

Awards and highlights
- UPI AFC Rookie of Year (1981); Pro Bowl (1981); PFWA All-Rookie Team (1981); Kansas City Chiefs Hall of Fame

Career NFL statistics
- Rushing att-yards: 329–1,501
- Receptions-yards: 33–299
- Touchdowns: 3
- Stats at Pro Football Reference
- College Football Hall of Fame

Joe Alton Delaney (/dɪˈleɪni/; October 30, 1958 – June 29, 1983) was an American professional football player who was a running back for two seasons in the National Football League (NFL). In his two seasons with the Kansas City Chiefs, Delaney set four franchise records that would stand for more than 20 years. His nephew is Terrace Marshall Jr.

He was a two-time All-American athlete for the Northwestern State Demons football team, as well as a track and field star. Delaney played two seasons with the Chiefs and was chosen as the AFC Rookie of the Year in 1981 by United Press International.

Delaney died on June 29, 1983, while attempting to rescue three children from drowning in a pond in Monroe in northeastern Louisiana. He was posthumously awarded the Presidential Citizen's Medal from U.S. President Ronald W. Reagan. While not officially retired, his jersey number while playing for the Chiefs, No. 37, has not been worn since his death.

== Early life ==
The third of Woodrow and Eunice Delaney's eight children, Delaney was born in Henderson, on October 30, 1958, and attended Haughton High School in Bossier Parish in northwestern Louisiana. Discouraged by his father from pursuing his dreams of playing football, Delaney became the starting wide receiver by his junior year at Haughton. Major Division I schools that scouted him included Grambling State, Texas, Oklahoma and Louisiana State.

Delaney played for Division I-AA's Northwestern State Demons from 1977 to 1980. After telling his coach of his willingness to play football at the collegiate level, Delaney switched to the running back position. He went on to be an All-American selection in 1979 and 1980. While at Northwestern State, Delaney met his future wife, Carolyn, and they had two children by his senior year.

On October 28, 1978, Delaney carried the ball 28 times and gained 299 yards for Northwestern State against Nicholls State University with 263 of the yards coming in the game's second half. Delaney's rushing stats in the second half of the game are an NCAA record. In the same game, he scored four touchdowns, one of which was on a 90-yard run, as he led his team to a 28–18 victory.

Delaney finished his career at Northwestern State with 3,047 yards rushing, 31 touchdowns, and 188 points. In 1980, his senior season, he was ranked eighth in the nation in all-purpose rushing yards. On November 22, 1980, he played his last game at Northwestern State and the school retired his jersey, number 44, at halftime. Delaney was elected to the College Football Hall of Fame in 1997.

At Northwestern State, Delaney also starred in track. In high school, he ran the 100 yard dash in 9.4 seconds and was on the Northwestern State track and field team, which won the NCAA 400-meter relay in 1981. He holds the school 200 meter dash record with a time of 20.64 seconds.

== Professional career ==
Delaney was selected 41st overall in the second round of the 1981 NFL draft by the Kansas City Chiefs. United Press International named him Rookie of the Year of the American Football Conference for the 1981 NFL season after he rushed for 1,121 yards, set four club records, and averaged 80.9 yards a game. Delaney's effort helped propel the Chiefs to a 9–7 record, the team's first winning season since 1973. In his rookie season, he was selected to the Pro Bowl after setting Chiefs records for most yards in a season (1,121), most yards in a game (193 vs. Houston), most consecutive 100-yard-plus games (three) and most 100-yard games in a season (five).

After coming off the bench to record 101 rushing yards in his initial NFL action at New England, he ran for 106 yards and registered 104 receiving yards in his first professional start against Oakland. In the Chiefs' October 18, 1981, game against the Denver Broncos, Delaney broke loose for a 75-yard touchdown run, but an offside penalty caused the play to be restarted from five yards back. On the second play after the penalty, Delaney scored an 82-yard touchdown, the longest rushing play from scrimmage in the 1981 NFL season.

Following Delaney's record-setting 196-yard rushing performance against the Houston Oilers on November 15, 1981, Oilers defensive end (and future Pro Football Hall of Famer) Elvin Bethea was quoted in saying:

I've played against the best–O. J. Simpson, Gale Sayers, Walter Payton and (Delaney) ranks right up there with them ... He is great with a capital G.

A strike by NFL players and an eye injury limited Delaney's playing time in the 1982 NFL season. He underwent surgery to repair a detached retina, and only registered 380 rushing yards in the nine-game shortened season, which the Chiefs finished with a 3–6 record. Delaney averaged 4.6 yards per carry, 9.1 yards per reception, and registered 1,811 all-purpose yards during his career with three touchdowns.

=== Professional statistics ===
Year	Team	GP	Rushing					Receiving					Kick returns					Fum
Year	Team	GP	Att	Yds	Avg	Lng	TD	Rec	Yds	Avg	Lng	TD	Ret	Yds	Avg	Lng	TD	Fum
1981	KC	15	234	1,121	4.8	82	3	22	246	11.2	61	0	1	11	11.0	11	0	9
1982	KC	8	95	380	4.0	36	0	11	53	4.8	13	0	0	0	0.0	0	0	0
Career		23	329	1,501	4.6	82	3	33	299	9.1	61	0	1	11	11.0	11	0	0

== Death and legacy ==
Delaney had a lifelong history of helping others and once paid for the funeral of a former teacher whose family could not afford a proper service. On June 29, 1983, Delaney, who was living in nearby Ruston, went with friends to Critter's Creek, an amusement center at Chennault Park in Monroe, Louisiana. While reportedly discouraging swimming children from venturing too far out in a pond, Delaney dove in to save three children who were screaming for help, floundering in a water hole left by recent construction work. The water hole, which covered two acres and was six feet (one point eight metres) deep, was not intended for swimming but to add to the park's aesthetics. Despite his inability to swim, Delaney nevertheless tried to rescue the children. One child managed to get out of the water without harm and another was taken to an emergency room where he later died; police recovered the body of Delaney and the remaining child. The amusement park has since been closed to the public.

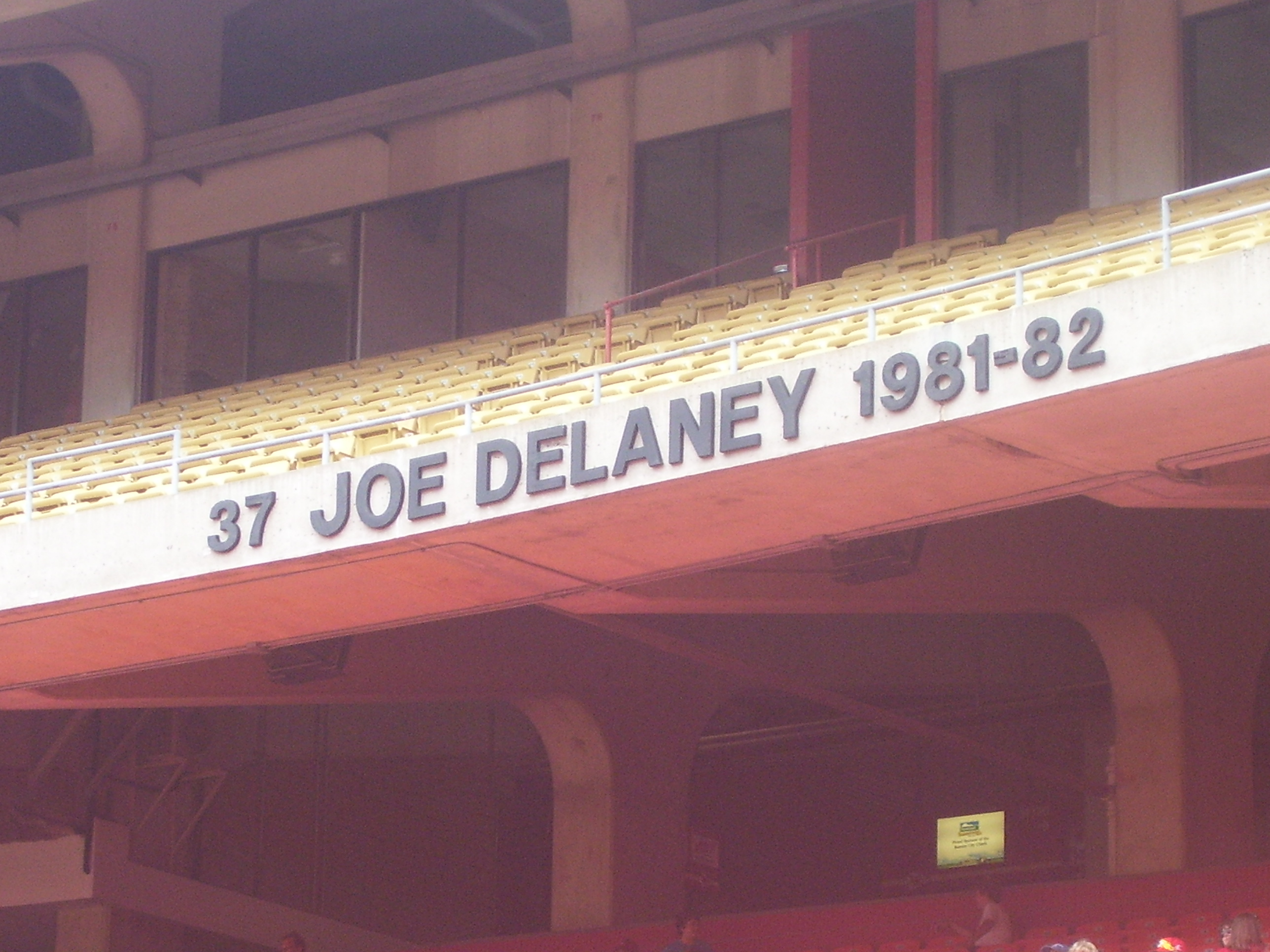
Delaney's name is commemorated at Arrowhead Stadium in the Kansas City Chiefs ring of honor.

Three thousand people attended Delaney's burial and memorial service on July 4, which was held in the sweltering heat of the Haughton High School gymnasium. Many fanned themselves with fans provided by the funeral home to combat the oppressive heat. President Ronald Reagan honored Delaney with the Presidential Citizens Medal on July 15, and it was presented to Delaney's family by Vice President George H. W. Bush. Reagan's words were:

He made the ultimate sacrifice by placing the lives of three children above regard for his own safety. By the supreme example of courage and compassion, this brilliantly gifted young man left a spiritual legacy for his fellow Americans.

For the 1983 NFL season, the Chiefs honored Delaney by wearing a circular patch bearing a gold eagle and the number 37 on the upper-left chest of their uniforms. Haughton High School also made a park, Joe Delaney Park, in his memory. The NCAA posthumously awarded Delaney the NCAA Award of Valor in 1984. Louisiana Governor Dave Treen presented the Louisiana State Civilian Bravery Award to Delaney's family following his death.

Delaney's heroism is honored through an award for one of the NFL's best running backs who also demonstrates admirable character and unselfishness, traits that were embodied by Delaney. The award is given annually by ProFootballTalk.com.

Northwestern State's football permanent team captains award, the Joe Delaney Memorial Leadership award, is named in his honor, as is the annual spring football game ("Delaney Bowl") and a golf tournament that generates support for the athletic program. A permanent shrine honoring him sits under the home stands at Northwestern State's Turpin Stadium and his number 44 jersey hangs in the football offices. In Virginia, the Delaney Athletic Conference took its name to honor his memory in the fall of 1983, and until 2021, 13 Virginia private high schools comprised the DAC.

A group of Chiefs fans in Kansas City formed the "37Forever Foundation", which works with the American Red Cross to provide swimming lessons for underprivileged children. The Kansas City Chiefs unofficially retired Delaney's jersey number 37 following his death, and he was elected to the team's Hall of Fame in 2004. His name is included in the Chiefs' ring of honor at Arrowhead Stadium. Delaney is also the uncle of wide receiver Terrace Marshall Jr.

== See also ==
- List of American football players who died during their careers
- List of gridiron football players who died during their careers
