= Billy Jackson (American football) =

American football player (born 1959)

No. 43
- Position: Running back

Personal information
- Born: September 13, 1959 (age 67); Phenix City, Alabama, U.S.
- Listed height: 5 ft 10 in (1.78 m)
- Listed weight: 217 lb (98 kg)

Career information
- High school: Central (Phenix City)
- College: Alabama
- NFL draft: 1981: 7th round, 180th overall pick

Career history
- Kansas City Chiefs (1981–1984); Los Angeles Raiders (1986)*
- * Offseason or practice squad member only

Awards and highlights
- 2× National champion (1978, 1979); Second-team All-SEC (1980)

Career NFL statistics
- Rushing yards: 1,365
- Rushing average: 3.4
- Rushing touchdowns: 16
- Stats at Pro Football Reference

Billy Thurman Jackson (born September 13, 1959) is an American former professional football player who was a running back in the National Football League (NFL) for the Kansas City Chiefs. He played college football for the Alabama Crimson Tide.

== See also ==
- Alabama Crimson Tide football yearly statistical leaders
