= List of Kansas City Chiefs team records =

This article details statistics relating to the Kansas City Chiefs National Football League (NFL) American football team, including career, single season and games records.

== Offense ==
=== Passing ===
- Most pass attempts, career: Patrick Mahomes, 3,815 (Present)
- Most pass attempts, season: Patrick Mahomes, 658 (2021)
- Most pass attempts, rookie season: Steve Fuller, 270 (1979)
- Most pass attempts, game: Patrick Mahomes, 68 (2022)
- Most pass completions, career: Patrick Mahomes, 2,778
- Most pass completions, season: Patrick Mahomes, 436 (2021)
- Most pass completions, rookie season: Steve Fuller, 146 (1979)
- Most pass completions, game: Patrick Mahomes, 43 (2022)
- Highest completion percentage, career (min. 500 attempts): Patrick Mahomes, 66.5
- Highest completion percentage, season (min. 200 attempts): Alex Smith, 67.5 (2017)
- Highest completion percentage, rookie season (min. 200 attempts): Steve Fuller, 54.1 (1979)
- Highest completion percentage, game (min. 15 attempts): Len Dawson, 89.5 (1967)
- Most passing yards, career: Patrick Mahomes, 32,352
- Most passing yards, season: Patrick Mahomes, 5,250 (2022)
- Most passing yards, rookie season: Steve Fuller, 1,484 (1979)
- Most passing yards, game: Elvis Grbac, 504 (2000)
- Highest yards per attempt, career (min. 500 attempts): Patrick Mahomes, 8.1
- Highest yards per attempt, season (min. 200 attempts): Len Dawson, 9.42 (1968)
- Highest yards per attempt, rookie season (min. 200 attempts): Steve Fuller, 5.5 (1979)
- Highest yards per attempt, game (min. 15 attempts): Len Dawson, 18.5 (1963)
- Most passing touchdowns, career: Patrick Mahomes, 238
- Most passing touchdowns, season: Patrick Mahomes, 50 (2018)
- Most passing touchdowns, rookie season: Steve Fuller, 6 (1979)
- Most passing touchdowns, game: Len Dawson, 6 (1964); Patrick Mahomes, 6 (2018 (twice))
- Most passes intercepted, career: Len Dawson, 178
- Most passes intercepted, season: Trent Green, 24 (2001)
- Most passes intercepted, rookie season: Steve Fuller, 14 (1979)
- Most passes intercepted, game: Todd Blackledge, 6 (1985)
- Lowest percentage passes had intercepted, career (min. 500 attempts): Alex Smith, 1.4
- Lowest percentage passes had intercepted, season (min. 200 attempts): Damon Huard, 0.41 (2006)
- Lowest percentage passes had intercepted, rookie season (min. 200 attempts): Steve Fuller, 5.2 (1979)
- Highest passer rating, career (min. 500 attempts): Patrick Mahomes, 105.7
- Highest passer rating, season (min. 200 attempts): Patrick Mahomes, 113.8 (2018)
- Highest passer rating, rookie season (min. 200 attempts): Steve Fuller, 55.8 (1979)
- Highest passer rating, game (min. 10 attempts): Len Dawson, 158.3 (1963); Trent Green, 158.3 (2003); Alex Smith, 158.3 (2013)
- Most games, 300+ passing yards, career: Patrick Mahomes, 41
- Most games, 350+ passing yards, career: Patrick Mahomes, 21
- Most games, 400+ passing yards, career: Patrick Mahomes, 9
- Most games, 300+ passing yards, season: Patrick Mahomes, 10 (2018, 2022)
- Most games, 350+ passing yards, season: Trent Green, 5 (2004); Patrick Mahomes, 5 (2018, 2020)
- Most games, 400+ passing yards, season: Patrick Mahomes, 2 (2019, 2020, 2021, 2022)
- Most games, 1+ passing TD's, career: Len Dawson, 116
- Most games, 2+ passing TD's, career: Len Dawson, 70
- Most games, 3+ passing TD's, career: Len Dawson, 38
- Most games, 4+ passing TD's, career: Patrick Mahomes, 16
- Most games, 5+ passing TD's, career: Patrick Mahomes, 6
- Most games, 6+ passing TD's, career: Patrick Mahomes, 2
- Most games, 1+ passing TD's, season: Patrick Mahomes, 17 (2022)
- Most games, 2+ passing TD's, season: Patrick Mahomes, 14 (2018)
- Most games, 3+ passing TD's, season: Patrick Mahomes, 10 (2018)
- Most games, 4+ passing TD's, season: Patrick Mahomes, 7 (2018)
- Most games, 5+ passing TD's, season: Patrick Mahomes, 2 (2018, 2021)
- Most games, 6+ passing TD's, season: Patrick Mahomes, 2 (2018)

=== Receiving ===
- Most receiving touchdowns, career: Travis Kelce 77
- Most receiving touchdowns, season: Dwayne Bowe, 15 (2010), Tyreek Hill, 15 (2020)
- Most receiving touchdowns, rookie season: Rashee Rice, 7 (2023)
- Most receiving touchdowns, game: Frank Jackson, 4 (1964); Jamaal Charles, 4 (2013); Travis Kelce, 4 (2022)
- Most pass receptions, career: Travis Kelce, 922 (as of Week Four of the 2024 NFL season)
- Most pass receptions, season: Tyreek Hill, 111 (2021)
- Most pass receptions, rookie season: Dwayne Bowe, 70 (2007)
- Most pass receptions, game: Tony Gonzalez, 14 (2005) Travis Kelce 14 (2024)
- Most receiving yards, career: Travis Kelce, 11,328
- Most receiving yards, season: Tyreek Hill, 1,479 (2018)
- Most receiving yards, rookie season: Dwayne Bowe, 995 (2007)
- Most receiving yards, game: Stephone Paige, 309 (1985)
- Most games, 100+ receiving yards, career: Travis Kelce, 37
- Most games, 100+ receiving yards, season: 6 (five players), most recently Travis Kelce (2020)
- Most consecutive games with a reception: Travis Kelce, 132
- Highest yard average per reception, career (min. 200 attempts): Carlos Carson, 18.1
- Highest yard average per reception, season (min. 50 attempts): Otis Taylor, 22.4 (1966)
- Highest yard average per reception, rookie season (min. 50 attempts): Dwayne Bowe, 14.2 (2007)
- Highest yard average per reception, game (min. 3 attempts): Curtis McClinton, 42.6 (1965)

=== Rushing ===
- Most rushing touchdowns, career: Priest Holmes, 76
- Most rushing touchdowns, season: Priest Holmes, 27 (2003) (tied 2nd NFL record)
- Most rushing touchdowns, rookie season: Billy Jackson, 10 (1981)
- Most rushing touchdowns, game: 4 (three players), most recently Priest Holmes and Derrick Blaylock (2004)
- Most rushing attempts, career: Larry Johnson, 1,375
- Most rushing attempts, season: Larry Johnson, 416 (2006)
- Most rushing attempts, rookie season: Joe Delaney, 234 (1981)
- Most rushing attempts, game: Larry Johnson, 39 (2006)
- Most rushing yards, career: Jamaal Charles, 7,260
- Most rushing yards, season: Larry Johnson, 1,789 (2006)
- Most rushing yards, rookie season: Kareem Hunt, 1,327 (2017)
- Most rushing yards, game: Jamaal Charles, 259 (2010)
- Most games, 100+ rushing yards, career: Larry Johnson, 30
- Most games, 100+ rushing yards, season: Larry Johnson, 11 (2006)
- Highest yard rushing average, career (min. 400 attempts): Jamaal Charles, 5.5
- Highest yard rushing average, season (min. 100 attempts): Jamaal Charles, 6.4 (2010)
- Highest yard rushing average, rookie season (min. 100 attempts): Abner Haynes, 5.6 (1960)
- Highest yard rushing average, game (min. 10 attempts): Abner Haynes, 14.3 (1960)

=== Combined (rushing and receiving) ===
- Most yards from scrimmage, career: Tony Gonzalez, 10,954
- Most yards from scrimmage, season: Priest Holmes, 2,287 (2002)
- Most yards from scrimmage, rookie season: Kareem Hunt, 1,782 (2017)
- Most yards from scrimmage, game: Stephone Paige, 309 (1985)
- Most yards from scrimmage, rookie game: Kareem Hunt, 246 (2017)
- Most total touchdowns, career: Priest Holmes, 83; Travis Kelce, 83
- Most total touchdowns, season: Priest Holmes, 27 (2003)
- Most total touchdowns, rookie season: Abner Haynes, 12 (1960); Tyreek Hill, 12 (2016)
- Most total touchdowns, game: Abner Haynes, 5 (1961); Jamaal Charles, 5 (2013)

== Defense ==
- Most solo tackles, career: Derrick Johnson, 941
- Most solo tackles, season: Donnie Edwards, 114 (2000)
- Most solo tackles, rookie season: Kevin Ross, 98 (1984)
- Most solo tackles, game: Eric Berry, 14 (2014)
- Most sacks, career: Derrick Thomas, 126.5
- Most sacks, season: Justin Houston, 22.0 (2014) (tied 2nd NFL record)
- Most sacks, rookie season: Derrick Thomas, 10.0 (1989)
- Most sacks, game: Derrick Thomas, 7.0 (1990)
- Most interceptions, career: Emmitt Thomas, 58
- Most interceptions, season: Emmitt Thomas, 12 (1974)
- Most interceptions, rookie season: Bobby Hunt, 8 (1962); Marcus Peters, 8 (2015)
- Most interceptions, game: 4 (three players), most recently Deron Cherry (1985)
- Most interceptions returned for touchdown, career: Bobby Bell, 6
- Most interceptions returned for touchdown, season: Jim Kearney, 4 (1972)
- Most interceptions returned for touchdown, rookie season: Dave Webster, 2 (1960); Marcus Peters, 2 (2015)
- Most interceptions returned for touchdown, game: 2 (three players), most recently Derrick Johnson (2010)
- Most interception yards returned, career: Emmitt Thomas, 937
- Most interception yards returned, season: Mark McMillian, 274 (1997)
- Most interception yards returned, rookie season: Dave Webster, 156 (1960)
- Most fumbles, career: Len Dawson, 81
- Most fumbles, season: Steve Fuller, 16 (1980)
- Most fumbles, rookie season: Abner Haynes, 9 (1960); Joe Delaney, 9 (1981)
- Most forced fumbles, career: Derrick Thomas, 41
- Most forced fumbles, season: Derrick Thomas, 8 (1992)
- Most forced fumbles, rookie season: Tamba Hali, 5 (2006)
- Most fumbles return for touchdown, career: Derrick Thomas, 4
- Most fumbles return for touchdown, season: Tim Gray, 2
- Most passes defended, career: Brandon Flowers, 92
- Most passes defended, season: Marcus Peters, 26 (2015)
- Most passes defended, rookie season: Marcus Peters, 26 (2015)

== Special teams ==
=== Kicking ===
- Most field goals attempted, career: Jan Stenerud, 436
- Most field goals attempted, season: Jan Stenerud, 44 (1971)
- Most field goals attempted, rookie season: Harrison Butker, 42 (2017)
- Most field goals attempted, game: Jan Stenerud, 7 (1971); Cairo Santos, 7 (2015)
- Most field goals made, career: Nick Lowery, 329
- Most field goals made, season: Harrison Butker, 38 (2017)
- Most field goals made, rookie season: Harrison Butker, 38 (2017) (NFL record)
- Most field goals made, game: Cairo Santos, 7 (2015)
- Highest field goal percentage, career (min. 100 attempts): Harrison Butker, 89.9
- Highest field goal percentage, season (min. 20 attempts): Pete Stoyanovich, 96.3 (1997)
- Highest field goal percentage, rookie season (min. 20 attempts): Harrison Butker, 90.5 (2017)
- Most field goals made, 50+ yards, career: Nick Lowery, 20
- Most field goals made, 50+ yards, season: 6 Harrison Butker (2021)
- Most field goals made, 50+ yards, game: 3 (five players), most recently Harrison Butker (2020)
- Most extra points attempted, career: Nick Lowery, 483
- Most extra points attempted, season: Harrison Butker, 69 (2019)
- Most extra points attempted, rookie season: Lawrence Tynes, 60 (2004)
- Most extra points attempted, game: 8 (four players), most recently Ryan Succop (2013)
- Most extra points made, career: Nick Lowery, 479
- Most extra points made, season: Harrison Butker, 65 (2018)
- Most extra points made, rookie season: Lawrence Tynes, 58 (2004)
- Most extra points made, game: 8 (four players), most recently Ryan Succop (2013)
- Highest extra point percentage, career (min. 100 attempts): Tommy Brooker, 100.0; Ryan Succop, 100.0
- Longest field goal, Harrison Butker, 62 yards (2022)

=== Punting ===
- Most punts, career: Dustin Colquitt, 1124
- Most punts, season: Daniel Pope, 101 (1999)
- Most punts, rookie season: Daniel Pope, 101 (1999)
- Highest punt yard average, career (min. 100 punts): Dustin Colquitt, 44.8
- Highest punt yard average, season (min. 50 punts): Dustin Colquitt, 46.8 (2012)
- Highest punt yard average, rookie season (min. 50 punts): Bob Grupp, 43.6 (1979)
- Most punts had blocked, career: Jerrel Wilson, 12
- Most punts had blocked, season: 2 (three players), most recently Daniel Pope (1999)
- Longest punt: Dustin Colquitt, 81 yards (2007)

=== Return ===
- Longest kick return, career: Knile Davis, 108 (2013) (tied 2nd NFL record)
- Most kick return yards, career: Dante Hall, 10,526
- Most kick return yards, season: Dante Hall, 1,950 (2003–2004)
- Most kick return yards, rookie season: Tamarick Vanover, 1,635 (1995)
- Most kick return yards, game: Jon Vaughn, 251 (1994)
- Most kickoff returns, career: Dante Hall, 360
- Most kickoff returns, season: Dante Hall, 68 (2004)
- Most kickoff returns, rookie season: Tamarick Vanover, 43 (1995)
- Most kickoff return yards gained, career: Dante Hall, 8,644
- Most kickoff return yards gained, season: Dante Hall, 1,718 (2004)
- Most kickoff return yards gained, rookie season: Noland Smith, 1,148 (1967)
- Most kickoff returns yards gained, game: Jon Vaughn, 251 (1994)
- Highest kickoff return average, career (min. 50 kickoff returns): Knile Davis, 27.8
- Highest kickoff return average, season (min. 25 kickoff returns): Quintin Demps, 30.1 (2013)
- Highest kickoff return average, rookie season (min. 25 kickoff returns): Noland Smith, 28.0 (1967)
- Most kickoff returns for touchdown, career: Dante Hall, 6
- Most kickoff returns for touchdown, season: 2 (three players), most recently Dante Hall (2004)
- Most kickoff returns for touchdown, rookie season: Paul Palmer, 2 (1987); Tamarick Vanover, 2 (1995)
- Most punt returns, career: J.T. Smith, 216
- Most punt returns, season: J. T. Smith (American football), 58 (1979); Dexter McCluster, 58 (2013)
- Most punt returns, rookie season: Tamarick Vanover, 51 (1995)
- Most punt return yards gained, career: J.T. Smith, 2,289
- Most punt return yards gained, season: Dexter McCluster, 686 (2013)
- Most punt return yards gained, rookie season: Tamarick Vanover, 540 (1995)
- Most punt return yards gained, game: Dexter McCluster, 177 (2013)
- Most punt returns for touchdown, career: Dante Hall, 5
- Most punt returns for touchdown, season: 2 (six players), most recently Tyreek Hill (2016)
- Most punt returns for touchdown, rookie season: Dale Carter, 2 (1992)
- Highest punt return yard average, career (min. 50 punt returns): Dexter McCluster, 12.1
- Highest punt return yard average, season (min. 20 punt returns): Dante Hall, 16.3 (2003)
- Highest punt return yard average, rookie season (min.20 punt returns): De'Anthony Thomas, 11.9 (2014)

== Miscellaneous ==
- Most games played: Dustin Colquitt, 238
- Most games started: Will Shields, 223
- Most points: Nick Lowery, 1,466
- Most points, season: Priest Holmes, 162 (2003)
- Most points, rookie season: Harrison Butker, 116 (2017)
- Most points, game: Abner Haynes, 30 (1961); Jamaal Charles, 30 (2013)
- Most two-point conversion made: Tony Gonzalez, 3; Travis Kelce, 3
- Most two-point conversions made, season: Bo Dickinson, 2 (1961); Travis Kelce, 2 (2015)
- Most safeties: Derrick Thomas, 3
- Most all-purpose yards, career: Dante Hall, 12,356
- Most all-purpose yards, season: Dante Hall, 2,446 (2003)
- Most all-purpose yards, rookie season: Abner Haynes, 2,100 (1960)
- Most all-purpose yards, game: Stephone Paige, 309 (1985)

== Career leaders ==
All lists are accurate through the 2025 season.

Bold denotes player currently plays for the Chiefs.

=== Passing leaders ===
**Top 10 career**
**Name**	**Seasons**	**Yards**
**Patrick Mahomes**	2017-Present	35,939
Len Dawson	1962–1975	28,507
Trent Green	2001–2006	21,459
Alex Smith	2013–2017	17,608
Bill Kenney	1980–1988	17,277
Steve DeBerg	1988–1991	11,873
Mike Livingston	1968–1979	11,295
Elvis Grbac	1997–2000	10,643
Matt Cassel	2009–2012	9,549
Steve Bono	1994–1996	6,489

=== Receiving leaders ===
**Top 10 career**
**Name**	**Seasons**	**Yards**
**Travis Kelce**	2013–Present	13,002
Tony Gonzalez	1997–2008	10,940
Otis Taylor	1965–1975	7,306
Dwayne Bowe	2007–2014	7,155
Tyreek Hill	2016-2021	6,569
Henry Marshall	1976–1987	6,545
Carlos Carson	1980–1989	6,360
Stephone Paige	1983–1991	6,341
Chris Burford	1960–1967	5,505
Eddie Kennison	2001–2007	5,230

=== Rushing leaders ===
**Top 10 career**
**Name**	**Seasons**	**Yards**
Jamaal Charles	2008–2016	7,260
Priest Holmes	2001–2007	6,070
Larry Johnson	2003–2009	6,015
Christian Okoye	1987–1992	4,897
Ed Podolak	1969–1977	4,451
Abner Haynes	1960–1964	3,814
Marcus Allen	1993–1997	3,698
Mike Garrett	1966–1970	3,246
Curtis McClinton	1962–1969	3,124
Herman Heard	1984–1989	2,694

== See also ==
- List of National Football League records (individual)
