= Legion of Zoom (Kansas City Chiefs) =

Nickname for the Kansas City Chiefs wide receiver corps

- Formation: Circa 2018–2022 (peaking in 2019–2020)
- Members: Tyreek Hill; Sammy Watkins; Demarcus Robinson; Mecole Hardman; Byron Pringle
- Parent organization: Kansas City Chiefs

The Legion of Zoom was a nickname given to the Kansas City Chiefs wide receiver corps, most prominently during the 2019 and 2020 NFL seasons. The group was recognized for its exceptional speed and deep-threat capability, and the moniker referenced the Seattle Seahawks' famed defensive unit, the "Legion of Boom".

== Origin ==
The nickname originated in 2019 as sports media and fans highlighted the unprecedented speed of Kansas City's receivers. According to an ESPN report, new arrivals to the Chiefs remarked that they felt "slow" compared to the rest of the unit. The term played on the Seattle Seahawks’ “Legion of Boom,” comparing the Chiefs’ offensive firepower to the defensive dominance of Seattle earlier in the decade. The name itself was originally coined and popularized by Brad Symcox and Tom Childs, English participants of the international Chiefs fan group Arrowheads Abroad.

== Composition ==
The primary members of the Legion of Zoom were Tyreek Hill, Sammy Watkins, Demarcus Robinson, Mecole Hardman, and Byron Pringle. Together they gave quarterback Patrick Mahomes multiple options for vertical passing plays and explosive offensive production. The players themselves have specified that to be a member of the Legion of Zoom, a player needs to run the 40-yard dash in under 4.4 seconds and catch five touchdown receptions from Patrick Mahomes.

== Impact ==
The speed and versatility of the unit forced opposing defenses to adjust their schemes and provided a central component of the Chiefs' strategy under head coach Andy Reid. In addition to success downfield, the group was also credited by Mahomes with stretching the field and allowing him to find other targets such as tight end Travis Kelce. The Legion of Zoom was instrumental in the team’s victory in Super Bowl LIV, where Kansas City defeated the San Francisco 49ers. The group remained central during the following season, contributing to an appearance in Super Bowl LV.

== Evolution and legacy ==
The prominence of the Legion of Zoom as the center of the Chiefs offense began to diminish following the trade of Tyreek Hill to the Miami Dolphins ahead of the 2022 season; while the name continued to be associated with the Chiefs through the early 2020s, by the 2023 offseason The Kansas City Star noted that the "Legion of Zoom" era was effectively in the past, as roster turnover and changes to the offensive scheme reshaped the team’s receiving corps. However, the Chiefs brought Mecole Hardman back to the team in a midseason trade in 2023, and he scored the walk-off touchdown in overtime of Super Bowl LVIII before departing the team again at the end of the 2024 season.

While the Tyreek Hill trade played a role in ending the Legion of Zoom, it set the stage for further Chiefs success by moving five draft picks to the Chiefs, whose 2022 draft class was credited by journalists as playing a significant role in the ensuing run of three straight Super Bowl appearances and two additional championships.

== Media ==
The nickname was further popularized by team-produced content, including the short film Kingdom Short: Legion of Zoom released on the Chiefs’ official website. The video focuses on Hill, Hardman, Watkins, and Robinson. The nickname was referenced by Dwayne Johnson during the introduction of the team for Super Bowl LIV.

== See also ==
- 2018 Kansas City Chiefs–Los Angeles Rams game
