= Daniel Pope =

American football player (born 1975)

No. 13, 4
- Position: Punter

Personal information
- Born: March 28, 1975 (age 51); Alpharetta, Georgia, U.S.
- Listed height: 5 ft 10 in (1.78 m)
- Listed weight: 203 lb (92 kg)

Career information
- High school: Milton
- College: Alabama
- NFL draft: 1999: undrafted

Career history
- Detroit Lions (1999)*; Kansas City Chiefs (1999); Cincinnati Bengals (2000); New York Jets (2001); Chicago Bears (2002)*; New England Patriots (2003)*
- * Offseason or practice squad member only

Awards and highlights
- First-team All-SEC (1998)

Career NFL statistics
- Games played: 33
- Stats at Pro Football Reference

Daniel Pope (born March 28, 1975) is an American former professional football player who was a punter for three seasons in the National Football League (NFL) for the Kansas City Chiefs, Cincinnati Bengals, New York Jets, and New England Patriots. He played college football for the Alabama Crimson Tide. He attended Milton High School.
