= Kansas City Chiefs =

NFL team in Kansas City, Missouri

- Current season
Logo	Wordmark
- Uniforms

General information
- Founded: August 14, 1959; 67 years ago
- Stadium: Arrowhead Stadium; Kansas City, Missouri
- Headquartered: University of Kansas Health System Training Facility; Kansas City, Missouri
- Colors: Red, gold, white
- Fight songs: "Tomahawk chop chant" "(You Gotta) Fight for Your Right (To Party!)"
- Mascot: Warpaint (1963–1988, 2009–2020); K. C. Wolf (1989–present)
- Website: chiefs.com

Personnel
- Owner: Hunt family
- CEO: Clark Hunt
- General manager: Brett Veach
- Head coach: Andy Reid
- President: Mark Donovan

Nicknames
- The Redwood Forest (defense, 1966–1971); The Legion of Zoom (offense, 2018–2021)

Team history
- Dallas Texans (1960–1962); Kansas City Chiefs (1963–present)

Home fields
- Cotton Bowl (1960–1962); Municipal Stadium (1963–1971); Arrowhead Stadium (1972–present); New Chiefs Stadium (c. 2031)

League / conference affiliations
- American Football League (1960–1969): Western Division (1960–1969); National Football League (1970–present): American Football Conference (1970–present); AFC West (1970–present)

Championships
- League championships: 5†: AFL championships (pre-1970 AFL–NFL merger) (3) 1962, 1966, 1969; Super Bowl championships: 4 1969 (IV), 2019 (LIV), 2022 (LVII), 2023 (LVIII); † – Does not include 1966 and 1969 AFL championships won during the same season that the Super Bowl was contested
- Conference championships: 5: AFC: 2019, 2020, 2022, 2023, 2024
- Division championships: 17: AFL Western: 1962, 1966; AFC West: 1971, 1993, 1995, 1997, 2003, 2010, 2016, 2017, 2018, 2019, 2020, 2021, 2022, 2023, 2024

Playoff appearances (27)
- AFL: 1962, 1966, 1968, 1969; NFL: 1971, 1986, 1990, 1991, 1992, 1993, 1994, 1995, 1997, 2003, 2006, 2010, 2013, 2015, 2016, 2017, 2018, 2019, 2020, 2021, 2022, 2023, 2024

Owners
- Lamar Hunt (1959–2006); Clark Hunt (2006–present)

The Kansas City Chiefs are a professional American football team based in Kansas City, Missouri. The Chiefs compete in the National Football League (NFL) as a member of the American Football Conference (AFC) West division. The team plays its home games at Arrowhead Stadium, with a New Chiefs Stadium slated to open in 2031.

Established in 1959 as a charter member of the American Football League (AFL), the Chiefs started playing in 1960 as the Dallas Texans, owned by league founder Lamar Hunt. In 1963, the team moved to Kansas City, and adopted its current name. The Chiefs joined the NFL in 1970 as a result of the AFL–NFL merger; entering the 2024 season, the team is valued at over US$4.85 billion. After Hunt's death in 2006, his wife, Norma, and children became legal owners of the team. After Norma's death in 2023, the Hunt children inherited her stake in the franchise. Clark Hunt, one of the Hunts' children, has been chairman and CEO since 2006 and is the ultimate authority over personnel decisions. He is also the team representative at league owner meetings.

The Chiefs were victorious and won three AFL championships, in 1962, 1966, and 1969, and were the second AFL team (after the New York Jets) to defeat an NFL team in a Super Bowl when they won Super Bowl IV, which was the final game before the league merger went into full effect. The Chiefs were also the second team, after the Green Bay Packers (whom they played in Super Bowl I), to appear in more than one Super Bowl (and the first AFL team to do so) and the first to appear in the championship game in two different decades. Despite this playoff success, the Chiefs failed to find success in the playoffs for decades. They only made the playoffs twice from 1970 to 1989, and managed only five other winning seasons during this time. While the Chiefs have been a contender for most of the time since the 1990s, they lost ten of twelve playoff games from 1993 to 2017, including an eight-game losing streak.

Since then, the Chiefs have risen to dynastic success under head coach Andy Reid, quarterback Patrick Mahomes, tight end Travis Kelce, and defensive tackle Chris Jones, appearing in five Super Bowls since 2019 and being victorious in three: LIV, LVII, and LVIII.

== History ==
=== American Football League ===
In 1959, Lamar Hunt began talking with other businessmen about creating a professional football league to rival the National Football League. Hunt's desire to secure a football team rose after watching the 1958 NFL Championship Game between the New York Giants and Baltimore Colts. After he tried and failed to buy the NFL's Chicago Cardinals and move the team to his hometown of Dallas, Texas, Hunt went to the NFL and asked to create an expansion franchise in Dallas. The NFL turned him down, so Hunt established the American Football League and started his own team, the Dallas Texans, to begin play in 1960.

Hunt hired a little-known assistant coach from the University of Miami football team, Hank Stram, to be the team's head coach after the job offer was declined by Bud Wilkinson and Tom Landry. Don Klosterman, hired as head scout, was widely credited for luring a wealth of talent to the Texans from the NFL, often hiding players and using creative means to land them.

The Texans shared the Cotton Bowl with the NFL's Dallas Cowboys for three seasons. The Texans were to have exclusive access to the stadium until the NFL put an expansion team, the Dallas Cowboys, there. While the team averaged a league-best 24,500 at the Cotton Bowl, the Texans gained less attention due to the AFL's relatively lower profile compared to the NFL's. In the franchise's first two seasons, the team managed records of 8–6 and 6–8.

In their third season, the Texans tallied an 11–3 record and a berth in the team's first American Football League Championship Game, against the Houston Oilers. The game was broadcast nationally on ABC and the Texans defeated the Oilers 20–17 in double overtime. The game lasted 77 minutes and 54 seconds, setting a record for longest game in professional American football. It is still the longest championship game in American Football League history.

It turned out to be the last game the team would play as the Dallas Texans. Despite competing against a Cowboys team that managed only a 9–28–3 record in their first three seasons, Hunt decided that the Dallas–Fort Worth media market couldn't sustain two professional football franchises. He considered moving the Texans to either Atlanta or Miami for the 1963 season. He was ultimately swayed by an offer from Kansas City Mayor Harold Roe Bartle. Bartle promised to triple the franchise's season ticket sales and expand the seating capacity of Municipal Stadium to accommodate the team.

Hunt agreed to move the franchise to Kansas City on May 22, 1963, and on May 26, the team was renamed the Kansas City Chiefs. Hunt and head coach Hank Stram initially planned to retain the Texans name, but a fan contest determined the new "Chiefs" name in honor of Mayor Bartle's nickname that he acquired in his professional role as Scout Executive of the St. Joseph and Kansas City Boy Scout Councils, and founder of the Scouting Society, the Tribe of Mic-O-Say. Despite the historical use of Native American features, it has been acknowledged that the team's naming was not a direct reference to Native Americans but only to Bartle's nickname "Chief". Business Insider journalist Meredith Cash even stated in January 2020 that Bartle "insisted on the team being named after himself" and that "Bartle was known as Chief Lone Bear within Mic-O-Say circles, and eventually the nickname "Chief" caught on among people throughout Kansas City."

The franchise became one of the strongest teams in the now thriving American Football League, with the most playoff appearances for an AFL team (tied with the Oakland Raiders), and the most AFL Championships (three). The team's dominance helped Lamar Hunt become a central figure in negotiations with NFL Commissioner Pete Rozelle to agree on an AFL–NFL merger. The leagues' officials agreed to hold a merged league championship game in January 1967, after the 1966 seasons ended. Hunt insisted on calling the game the "Super Bowl" after seeing his children playing with a popular toy at the time, a Super Ball. While the first few games were designated the "AFL–NFL World Championship Game", the Super Bowl name became its officially licensed title in years to come.

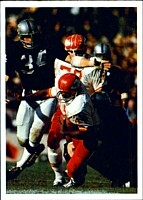
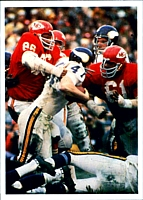
The Chiefs topped the Raiders in the 1969 AFL championship game (left) and went on to defeat the Vikings in Super Bowl IV (right)

The Chiefs cruised to an 11–2–1 record in 1966, and defeated the defending AFL Champion Buffalo Bills in the AFL Championship Game. The Chiefs were invited to play the NFL's league champion Green Bay Packers in the first AFL–NFL World Championship Game. Kansas City and Green Bay played a close game for the first half, but Green Bay took control in the final two quarters, winning the game by a score of 35–10. The Chiefs lost the game but gained the respect of several Packers opponents after the game. The Chiefs' inter-league match-up with the Packers was not the last time that they would face an NFL opponent, especially on the championship stage. The next August, Kansas City hosted the NFL's Chicago Bears in the 1967 preseason and won the game 66–24.

Despite losing to the division rival Oakland Raiders twice in the regular season in 1969, the two teams met for a third time in the AFL Championship Game, where Kansas City won 17–7. Backup quarterback Mike Livingston led the team in a six-game winning streak after Len Dawson suffered a leg injury that kept him out of most of the season's games.

While getting plenty of help from the club's defense, Dawson returned from the injury and led the Chiefs to Super Bowl IV. Against the NFL champion Minnesota Vikings, who were favored by 12 1/2, the Chiefs dominated the game 23–7 to claim the team's first Super Bowl championship. Dawson was named the game's Most Valuable Player after completing 12-of-17 passes for 142 yards and one touchdown, with 1 interception. The following season, the Chiefs and the rest of the American Football League merged with the National Football League after the AFL–NFL merger became official. The Chiefs were placed in the American Football Conference's West Division.

From 1960 to 1969, the Chiefs/Texans won 87 games, which is the most in the ten-year history of the AFL.

=== Hank Stram leaves team ===
In 1970, the Chiefs finished 7–5–2 and missed the playoffs. The next season, the Chiefs tallied a 10–3–1 record and won the AFC West Division. Head coach Hank Stram considered his 1971 Chiefs team as his best, but they failed to capture their championship dominance from 1969. Most of the pieces of the team that won Super Bowl IV two years earlier were still in place for the 1971 season. The Chiefs tied with the Miami Dolphins for the best record in the AFC, and both teams met in a Christmas Day playoff game which the Chiefs lost 27–24 in double overtime. The Dolphins outlasted the Chiefs with a 37-yard field goal. The game surpassed the 1962 AFL Championship Game as the longest ever at 82 minutes and 40 seconds. The game was also the final football game at Kansas City's Municipal Stadium.

In 1972, the Chiefs moved into the newly constructed Arrowhead Stadium at the Truman Sports Complex outside of downtown Kansas City. The team's first game at Arrowhead was against the St. Louis Cardinals, a preseason game that the Chiefs won 24–14. Linebacker Willie Lanier and quarterback Len Dawson won the NFL Man of the Year Award in 1972 and 1973, respectively.

The Chiefs did not return to the post-season for the remainder of the 1970s, and the 1973 season was the team's last winning season for seven years. Hank Stram was fired after a 5–9 season in 1974, and many of the Chiefs' future Hall of Fame players departed by the middle of the decade. From 1975 to 1988, the Chiefs had become a team that rarely won, which provided Chiefs fans with nothing but futility. Five head coaches struggled to achieve the same success as Stram, compiling an 81–121–1 record.

In 1980, Coach Marv Levy cut future Hall of Fame Kicker Jan Stenerud for little-known Nick Lowery, who would become the most accurate kicker in NFL history over the next 14 years. In 1981, running back Joe Delaney rushed for 1,121 yards and was named the AFC Rookie of the Year. The Chiefs finished the season with a 9–7 record and entered the 1982 season with optimism. The NFL Players Association strike curbed the Chiefs' chances of returning to the postseason for the first time in over a decade. The Chiefs tallied a 3–6 record and in the off-season, Joe Delaney died while trying to save several children from drowning in a pond near his home in Louisiana.

The Chiefs drafted quarterback Todd Blackledge over future greats such as Jim Kelly and Dan Marino in the 1983 NFL draft. Blackledge never started a full season for Kansas City while Kelly and Marino played Hall of Fame careers. While the Chiefs struggled on offense in the 1980s, they had a strong defensive unit consisting of Pro Bowlers such as Bill Maas, Albert Lewis, Art Still and Deron Cherry.

John Mackovic took over head coaching duties for the 1983 season after Marv Levy was fired. Over the next four seasons, Mackovic coached the Chiefs to a 30–34 record, but took the team to its first postseason appearance in 15 years in the 1986 NFL playoffs. They lost to the New York Jets in the wild card round. Despite leading the Chiefs to only their third winning season and second playoff appearance since the merger, Mackovic was fired for what Hunt described as a lack of chemistry. Frank Gansz served as head coach for the next two seasons, but won only eight of 31 games.

=== Marty Schottenheimer era (1989–1998) ===
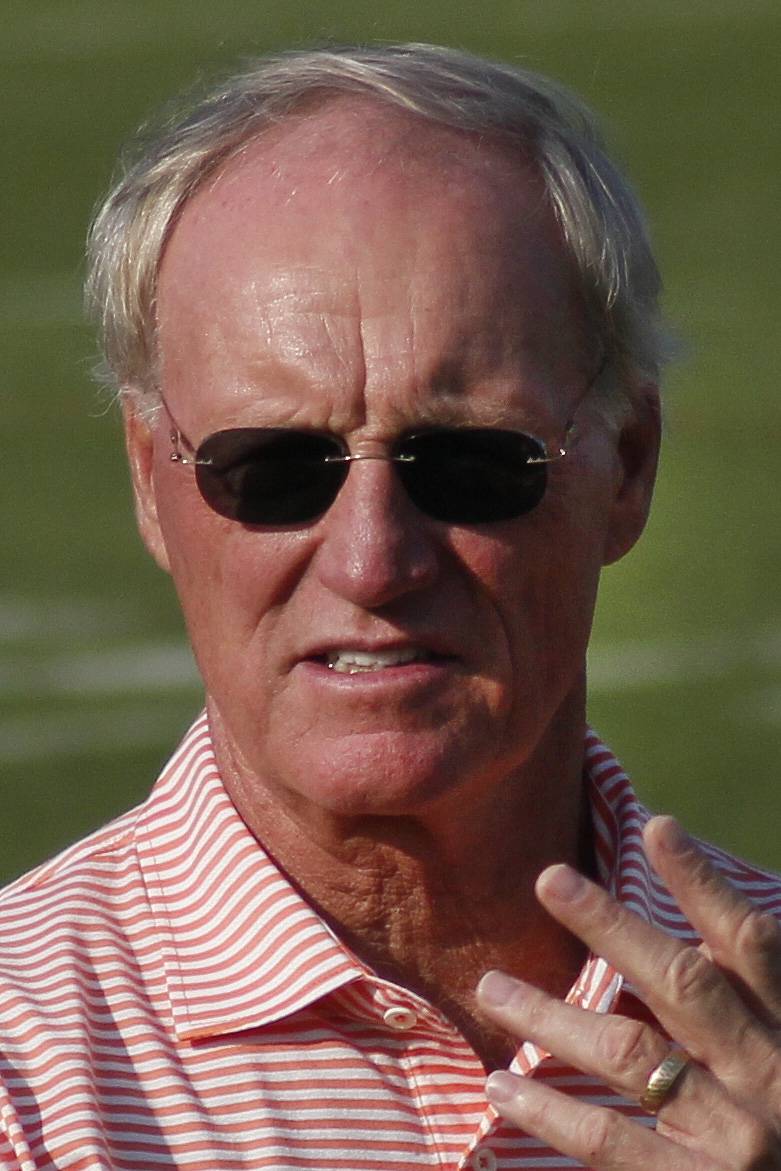
The Chiefs under Marty Schottenheimer had the second highest regular season winning percentage (.646) in the NFL during the 1990s.

On December 19, 1988, owner Lamar Hunt hired Carl Peterson as the team's new president, general manager, and chief executive officer. Peterson fired head coach Frank Gansz two weeks after taking over and hired Marty Schottenheimer as the club's seventh head coach. In the 1988 and 1989 NFL drafts, the Chiefs selected both defensive end Neil Smith and linebacker Derrick Thomas, respectively. The defense that Thomas and Smith anchored in their seven seasons together was a big reason why the Chiefs reached the postseason in six straight years.

In Schottenheimer's tenure as head coach, the Chiefs became a perennial playoff contender, featuring offensive players including Steve DeBerg, Christian Okoye, Stephone Paige and Barry Word, a strong defense, anchored by Thomas, Smith, Albert Lewis and Deron Cherry, and on special teams, Nick Lowery, who was then the most accurate kicker in NFL History. The team recorded a 101–58–1 record, and clinched seven playoff berths. The Chiefs' 1993 season was the franchise's most successful in 22 years. With newly acquired quarterback Joe Montana and running back Marcus Allen, two former Super Bowl champions and Most Valuable Player Award winners, the Chiefs further strengthened their position in the NFL. The 11–5 Chiefs defeated the Pittsburgh Steelers and Houston Oilers on their way to the franchise's first AFC Championship Game appearance against the Buffalo Bills. The Chiefs were overwhelmed by the Bills and lost the game by a score of 30–13. The Chiefs' victory on January 16, 1994, against the Oilers remained the franchise's last post season victory for 22 years until their 30–0 victory over the Houston Texans on January 9, 2016.

In the 1995 NFL playoffs, the 13–3 Chiefs hosted the Indianapolis Colts in a cold, damp late afternoon game at Arrowhead Stadium. Kansas City lost the game 10–7 against the underdog Colts, after kicker Lin Elliot missed three field goal attempts and quarterback Steve Bono threw three interceptions. The Chiefs selected tight end Tony Gonzalez with the 13th overall selection in the 1997 NFL draft, a move which some considered to be a gamble being that Gonzalez was primarily a basketball player at California. During a 1997 season full of injuries to starting quarterback Elvis Grbac, backup quarterback Rich Gannon took the reins of the Chiefs' offense as the team headed to another 13–3 season. Head coach Marty Schottenheimer chose Grbac to start the playoff game against the Denver Broncos despite Gannon's successes in previous weeks. Grbac's production in the game was lacking, and the Chiefs lost to the Broncos 14–10. Denver went on to capture their fifth AFC Championship by defeating Pittsburgh and then defeated the Green Bay Packers in Super Bowl XXXII. Coach Schottenheimer announced his resignation from the Chiefs after the 1998 season.

Defensive coordinator Gunther Cunningham took over coaching duties for the next two seasons, compiling a 16–16 record. By the end of the Chiefs' decade of regular season dominance, Gannon had signed with the Oakland Raiders, Neil Smith signed with the Denver Broncos, and Derrick Thomas was paralyzed in a car accident on January 23, 2000. Thomas died from complications of his injury weeks later. Head coach Gunther Cunningham was fired.

=== Dick Vermeil years (2001–2005) ===
Looking to change the Chiefs' game plan which relied on a tough defensive strategy for the past decade, Carl Peterson contacted Dick Vermeil about the Chiefs' head coaching vacancy for the 2001 season. Vermeil previously led the St. Louis Rams to a victory in Super Bowl XXXIV. Vermeil was hired on January 12. The Chiefs then traded a first-round draft pick in the 2001 NFL draft to St. Louis for quarterback Trent Green and signed free agent running back Priest Holmes to be the team's cornerstones on offense. In Vermeil's first season with the Chiefs, he led the team to a 6–10 record. The team improved to an 8–8 record in 2002 but still missed the postseason.

In 2003, Kansas City began the season with nine consecutive victories, a franchise record. They finished the season with a 13–3 record and the team's offense led the NFL in several categories under the direction of USA Today's Offensive Coach of the Year honoree, Al Saunders. Running back Priest Holmes surpassed Marshall Faulk's single-season touchdown record by scoring his 27th rushing touchdown against the Chicago Bears in the team's regular season finale. The team clinched the second seed in the 2003 NFL playoffs and hosted the Indianapolis Colts in the AFC Divisional Playoffs. In a game where neither team punted, the Chiefs lost the shoot-out 38–31. It was the third time in nine seasons that the Chiefs went 8–0 at home in the regular season, only to lose their post-season opener at Arrowhead.

After a disappointing 7–9 record in 2004, the 2005 Chiefs finished with a 10–6 record but no playoff berth. They were the fourth team since 1990 to miss the playoffs with a 10–6 record. Running back Larry Johnson started in place of the injured Priest Holmes and rushed for 1,750 yards in only nine starts. Head coach Dick Vermeil announced his retirement before the season's final game, in which the Chiefs defeated the playoff-bound Cincinnati Bengals, 37–3.

=== Decline ===
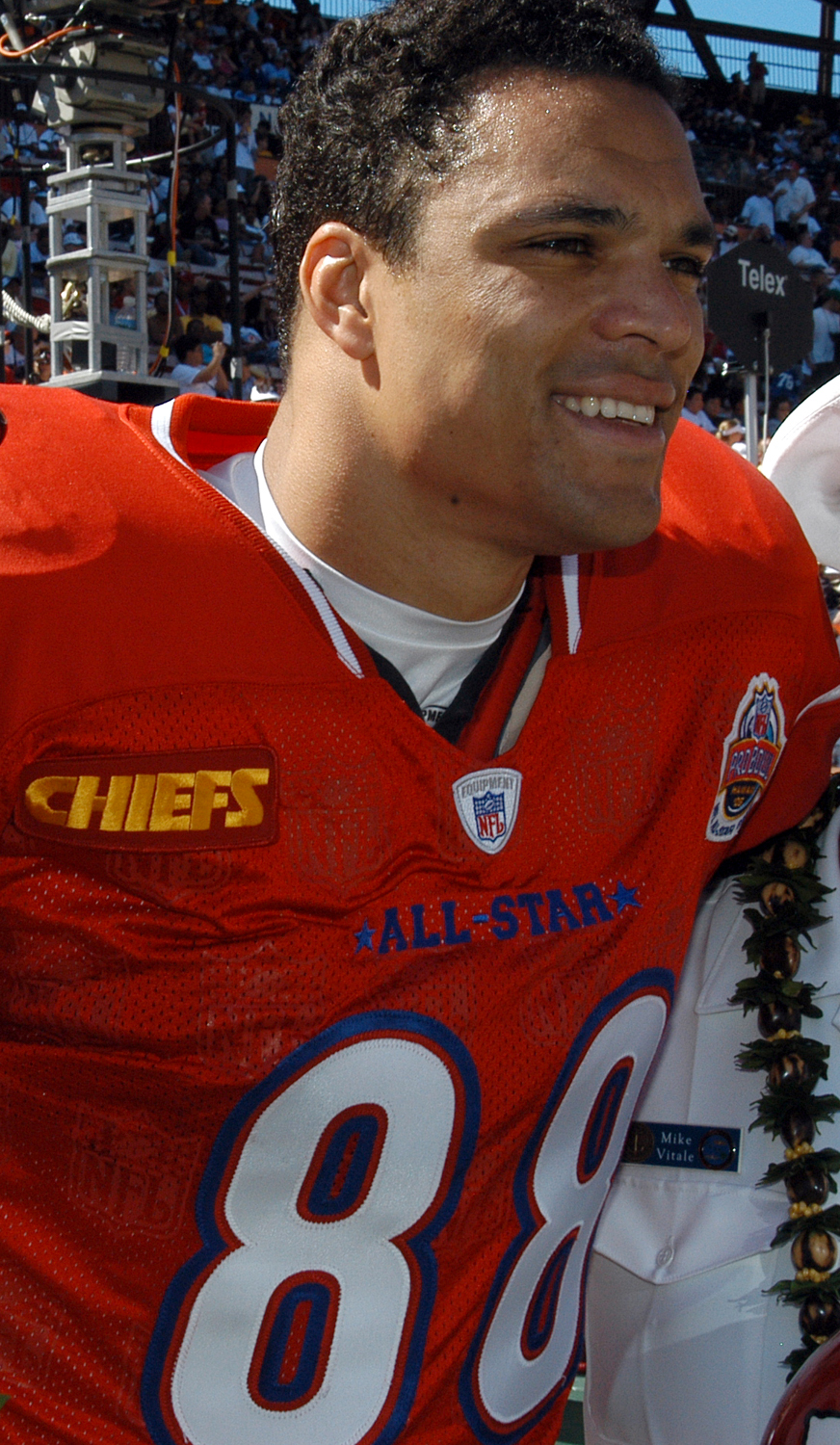
10x All-Pro Tony Gonzalez has the most receptions (1,325) and receiving yards (15,127) in NFL history for a tight end.

Within two weeks of Vermeil's retirement, the Chiefs returned to their defensive roots with the selection of its next head coach. The team introduced Herm Edwards, a former Chiefs scout and head coach of the New York Jets, as the team's tenth head coach after trading a fourth-round selection in the 2006 NFL draft to the Jets. Quarterback Trent Green suffered a severe concussion in the team's season opener to the Cincinnati Bengals which left him out of play for eight weeks. Backup quarterback Damon Huard took over in Green's absence and led the Chiefs to a 5–3 record.

Kansas City was awarded a Thanksgiving Day game against the Denver Broncos in response to owner Lamar Hunt's lobbying for a third Thanksgiving Day game. The Chiefs defeated the Broncos 19–10 in the first Thanksgiving Day game in Kansas City since 1969. Hunt was hospitalized at the time of the game and died weeks later on December 13 due to complications of prostate cancer. The Chiefs honored their owner for the remainder of the season, as did the rest of the league. Trent Green returned in the middle of the season, but struggled in the final stretch, and running back Larry Johnson set an NFL record with 416 carries in a season. Kansas City managed to clinch their first playoff berth in three seasons with a 9–7 record and a bizarre sequence of six losses from other AFC teams on New Year's Eve, culminating with a Broncos loss to the 49ers. The Indianapolis Colts hosted the Chiefs in the Wild Card playoffs and defeated Kansas City 23–8.

In 2007, Trent Green was traded to the Miami Dolphins leaving the door open for either Damon Huard or Brodie Croyle to become the new starting quarterback. After starting the season with a 4–3 record, the Chiefs lost the remaining nine games when running back Larry Johnson suffered a season-ending foot injury and the quarterback position lacked stability with Huard and Croyle. Despite the team's 4–12 record, tight end Tony Gonzalez broke Shannon Sharpe's NFL record for touchdowns at the position (63) and defensive end Jared Allen led the NFL in quarterback sacks with 15.5.

The Chiefs began their 2008 season with the youngest team in the NFL. The starting lineup had an average of 25.5 years of age. By releasing several veteran players such as cornerback Ty Law and wide receiver Eddie Kennison and trading defensive end Jared Allen, the Chiefs began a youth movement. The Chiefs had a league-high thirteen selections in the 2008 NFL draft and chose defensive tackle Glenn Dorsey and offensive lineman Branden Albert in the first round. Analysts quickly called Kansas City's selections as the best of the entire draft.

Entering the season, the Chiefs were unsure if injury-prone quarterback Brodie Croyle, who was the incumbent starter, could be their quarterback in the long-term. Croyle was injured in the team's first game of the season and Damon Huard started in Croyle's absence. Tyler Thigpen become the third Chiefs starting quarterback in as many games for a start against the Atlanta Falcons. After a poor performance by Thigpen, in which he threw three interceptions against the Falcons defense, Huard was retained as the starting quarterback. The Chiefs struggled off the field as much as on as tight end Tony Gonzalez demanded a trade and running back Larry Johnson was involved in legal trouble.

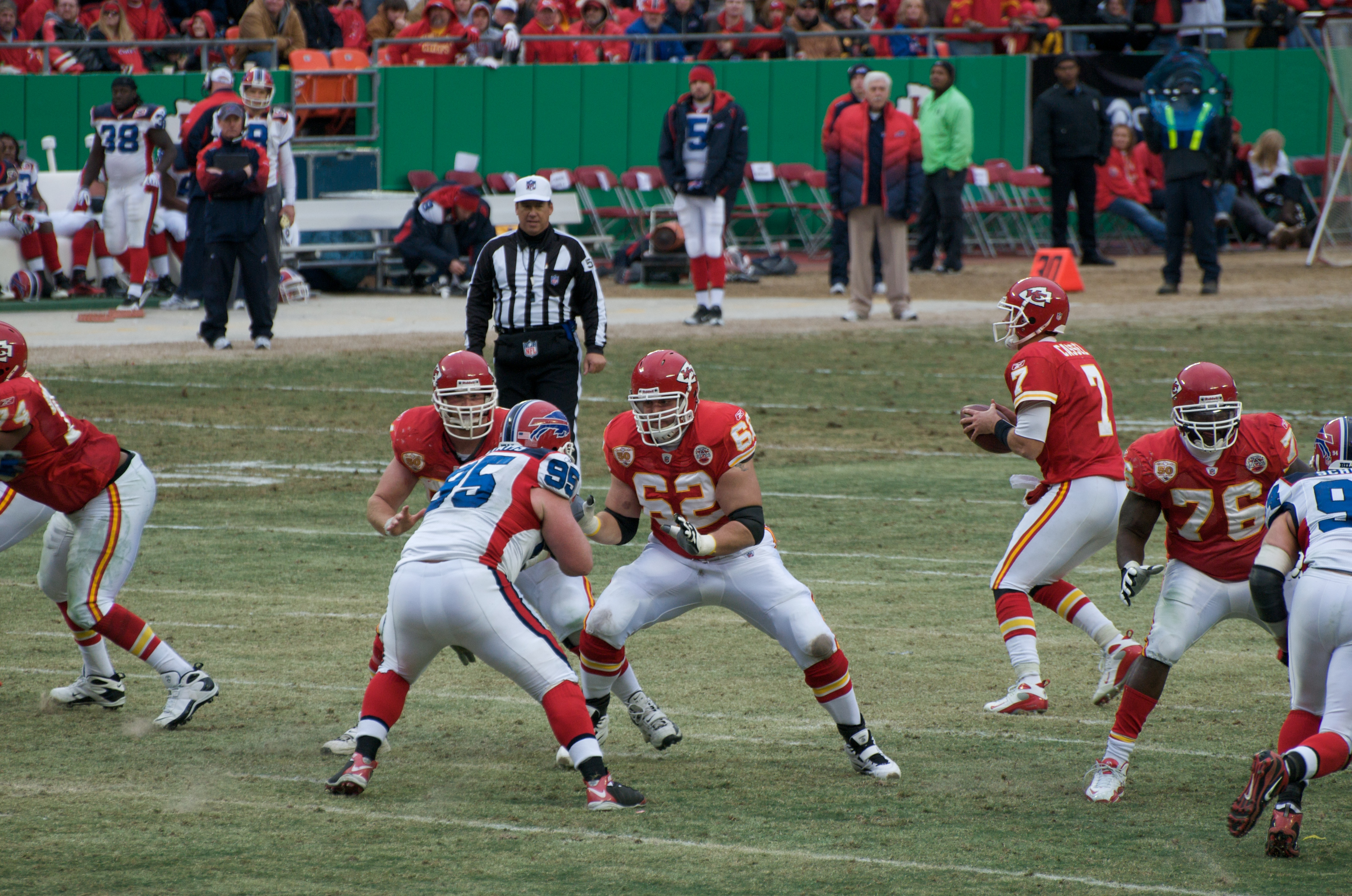
The Chiefs hosting the Buffalo Bills in 2009; Quarterback Matt Cassel, wearing #7

Croyle returned for the Chiefs' game against the Tennessee Titans, but both he and Damon Huard suffered season-ending injuries in the game. The Chiefs reorganized their offense to a new spread offense game plan focused around Tyler Thigpen. The Chiefs' new offense was implemented to help Thigpen play to the best of his abilities and also in the absence of Larry Johnson, who was suspended for his off-field conduct. The Chiefs gambled by using the spread offense, as most in the NFL believe that it cannot work in professional football, and also head coach Herm Edwards was traditionally in favor of more conservative, run-oriented game plans. The 2008 season ended with a franchise worst 2–14 record, where the team suffered historic blowout defeats nearly week-in and week-out, a 34–0 shut-out to the Carolina Panthers, and allowed a franchise-high 54 points against the Buffalo Bills. The team's general manager, chief executive officer, and team president Carl Peterson resigned at the end of the season, and former New England Patriots vice president of player personnel Scott Pioli was hired as his replacement for 2009.

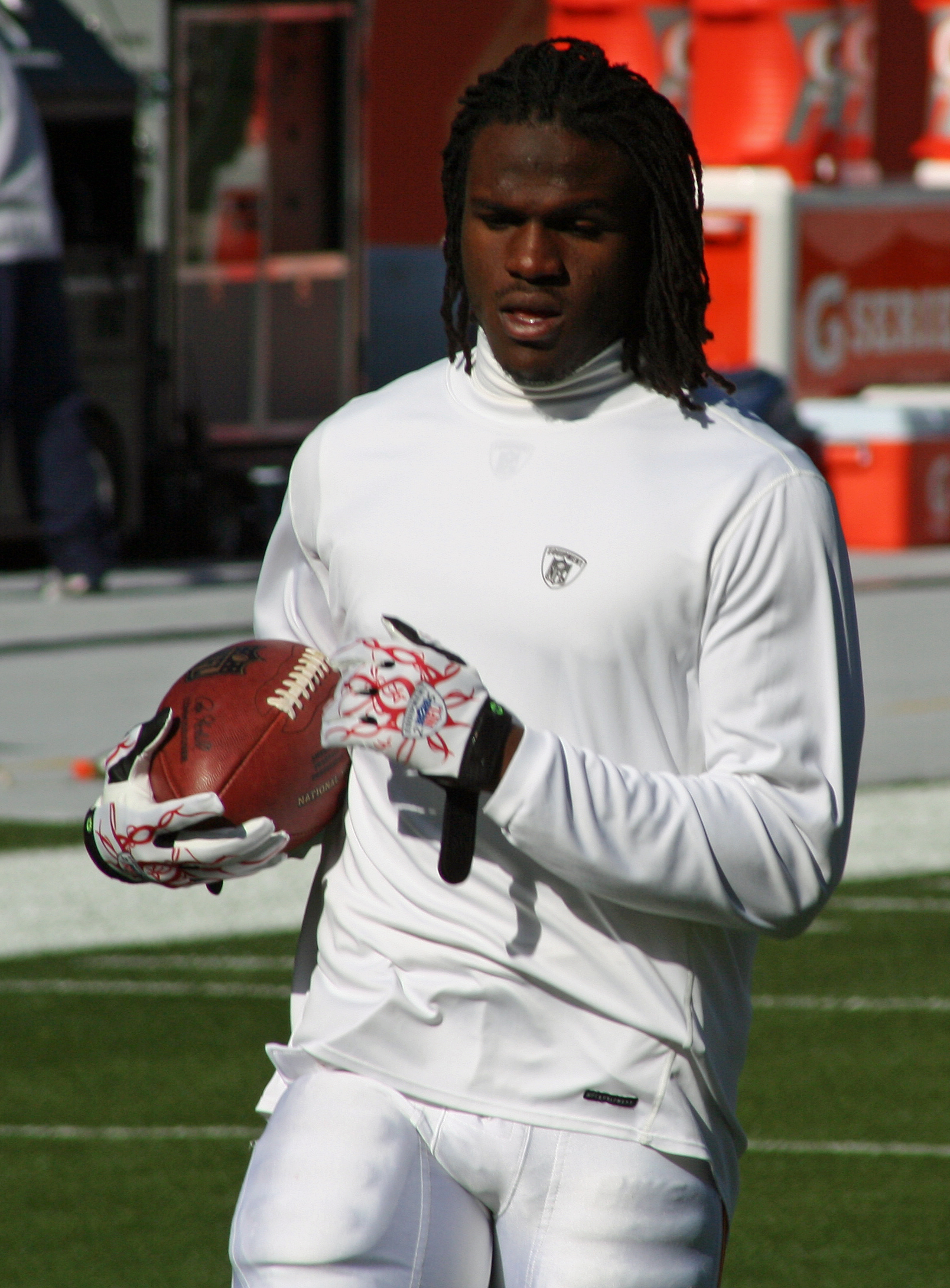
Jamaal Charles averaged 5.4 yards per carry during his career which is an NFL record for a running back.

On January 23, 2009, Herm Edwards was fired as head coach, and two weeks later Todd Haley signed a four-year contract to become Edwards' successor. Haley had a background with Pioli, which made him an attractive hire for Pioli's first coach in Kansas City. In April 2009, Tony Gonzalez was traded to the Atlanta Falcons after failed trade attempts over the previous two seasons. Notably, head coach Todd Haley fired offensive coordinator Chan Gailey just weeks before the start of the 2009 season and chose to take on the coordinator duties himself. Throughout 2009 the Chiefs acquired veterans to supplement the Chiefs' young talent including Matt Cassel, Mike Vrabel, Bobby Engram, Mike Brown, Chris Chambers, and Andy Alleman. The team finished with a 4–12 record, just a two-game improvement upon their record from the 2008 season.

For the 2010 season, the Chiefs made significant hires for their coaching staff, bringing on former Patriots assistant coaches Charlie Weis and Romeo Crennel to coach the offense and defense, respectively. The coaching additions proved to be very successful, as the Chiefs would go on to secure their first AFC West title since 2003. Their ten victories in the 2010 season combined for as many as the team had won in their previous three seasons combined.

On January 9, 2011, the Chiefs lost their home Wild Card playoff game to the Baltimore Ravens 30–7. Six players were chosen for the Pro Bowl: Dwayne Bowe, Jamaal Charles, Brian Waters, Tamba Hali, Matt Cassel, and rookie safety Eric Berry. Jamaal Charles won the FEDEX ground player of the year award and Dwayne Bowe led the NFL in touchdown receptions.

For their first pick in the 2011 NFL draft, the team selected Jon Baldwin. After a poor start, Haley was relieved of duties as head coach on December 12. Clark Hunt made note of "bright spots at different points this season," but felt that overall the Chiefs were not progressing. The highest point of the 2011 season was an upset win against the Packers, who at that time, were undefeated with a 13–0 record. Defensive coordinator Romeo Crennel would be named the team's interim head coach for the remaining three games of the season, including the aforementioned Packers game. On January 9, 2012, Crennel was named the 11th full-time head coach in Chiefs history.

The 2012 Chiefs became the first team since the 1929 Buffalo Bisons to not lead in regulation through any of their first nine games. The Chiefs tied their franchise-worst record of 2–14 and clinched the No. 1 overall pick in the 2013 NFL draft. It is the first time since the merger they have held the first overall pick.

=== Reemergence and the arrival of Andy Reid (2013–2017) ===
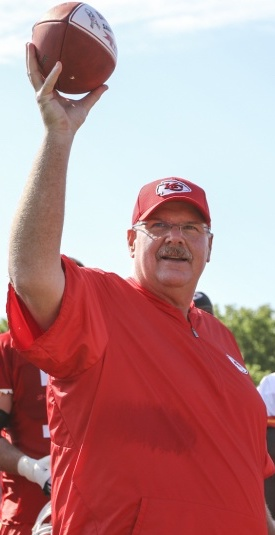
Coach Andy Reid "Big Red" has led the Chiefs to nine consecutive division titles and five Super Bowl appearances.

After the 2012 season, the Chiefs fired head coach Romeo Crennel and general manager Scott Pioli. Former Philadelphia Eagles head coach Andy Reid was brought in as head coach to work with new general manager John Dorsey, a former Green Bay Packers head scout. The Chiefs acquired quarterback Alex Smith from the San Francisco 49ers for the Chiefs' second-round pick, 34th overall, in the 2013 draft and a conditional pick in the 2014 draft. Matt Cassel was released shortly after. The Chiefs selected Eric Fisher with the first overall pick of the 2013 NFL draft along with Travis Kelce who was drafted in the third round (63rd pick overall) in the same draft.

In 2013, the Chiefs started 9–0 for the second time in team history. The team finished with a 11–5 record and made the playoffs. They led in their wildcard game against the Indianapolis Colts 38–10 shortly after halftime, but collapsed late and lost 45–44.

In 2014, the Chiefs attempted to make the playoffs for the second straight season for the first time since 1995, finishing 9–7 and getting eliminated in Week 17. After a promising win for the Chiefs against Houston in Week 1, Kansas City went on a five-game losing streak culminating in a 16–10 loss to Minnesota and the loss of Jamaal Charles to a torn ACL. They made one of the most improbable season comebacks in the NFL and won ten straight to improve their record from 1–5 to 11–5. The team clinched a playoff berth after a 17–13 win over Cleveland in Week 16 to become only the second post-merger NFL team to make the playoffs after a 1–5 start.

The streak achieved by the Chiefs broke a franchise record for nine straight (2003, 2013) and second nine plus game win streak under Reid. After a Week 17 win over Oakland 23–17, the Chiefs achieved their longest winning streak in franchise history at ten games. They qualified for the playoffs, playing in the 2015 AFC Wild-Card playoff game, held at NRG Stadium in Houston, Texas on January 9, 2016. The Chiefs defeated the Houston Texans 30–0 to earn their first NFL playoff win in 23 seasons, dating back to the 1993–94 NFL playoffs, a win that also came in Houston. The Chiefs' Wild-Card playoff victory ended what was at the time the third-longest drought in the NFL, and it also ended a then NFL record eight-game playoff losing streak. Riddled with injuries, they were defeated by the New England Patriots 27–20 in the AFC Divisional Round.

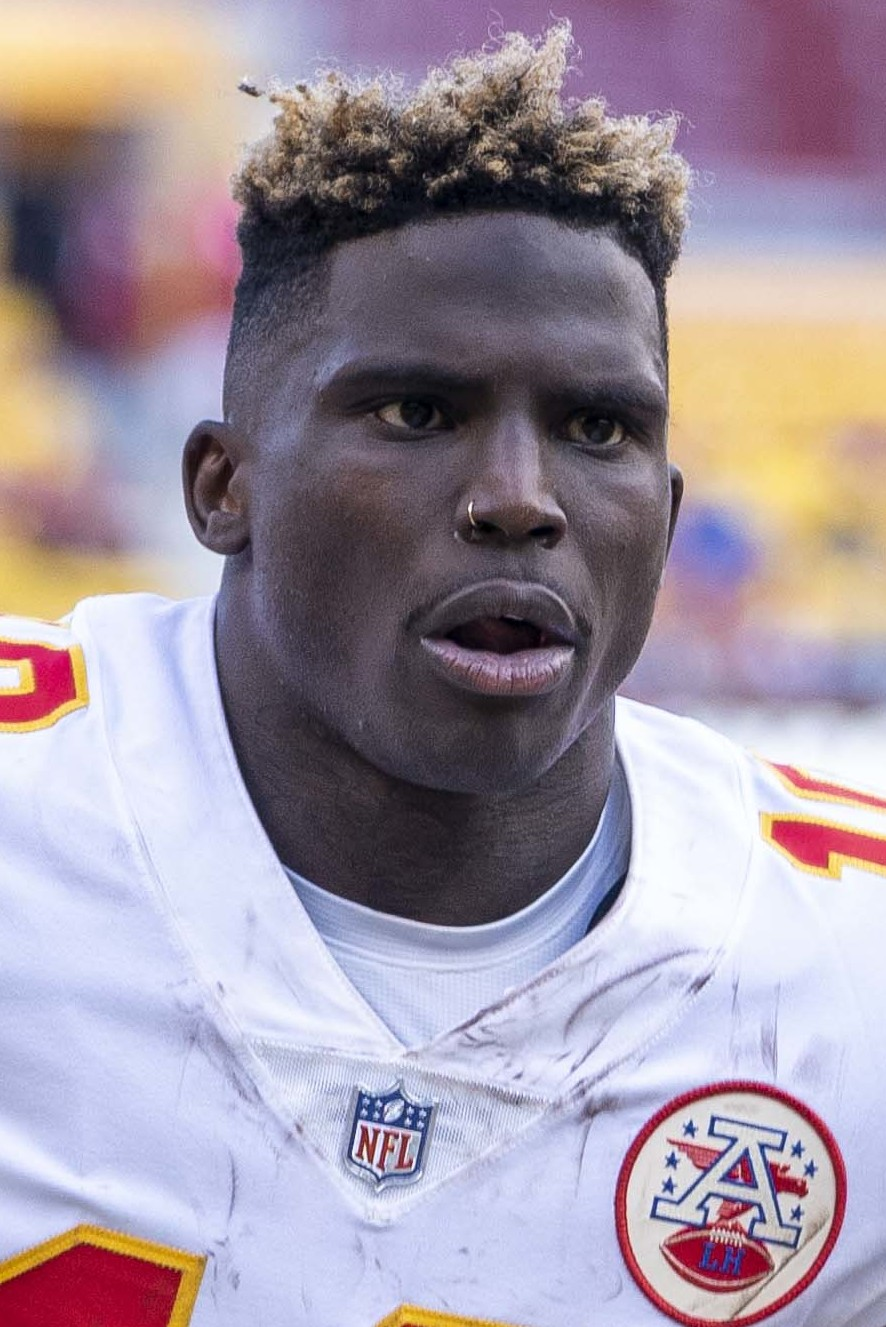
Tyreek Hill made the Pro Bowl in all six seasons with the Chiefs as a return specialist-wide receiver.

The Chiefs first game of the 2016 season was against their division rival, the San Diego Chargers. After facing a 24–3 deficit with six minutes left in the 3rd quarter, the Chiefs engineered a 33–27 comeback win ending with a two-yard touchdown run by Alex Smith in overtime to give the Chiefs their largest regular season comeback to start the season at 1–0. On Christmas Day, the Chiefs defeated the Denver Broncos 33–10 to give Kansas City their tenth straight win against divisional opponents. On January 1, 2017, the Chiefs clinched the AFC West and the second seed going into the playoffs that year, where they fell to the Pittsburgh Steelers 18–16 in the divisional round as Chris Boswell hit six field goals.

The Chiefs finished the 2017 season with a 10–6 record, and won the AFC West. This was the first time in Chiefs history that they won the AFC West in back-to-back years. In the Wild Card round, the Chiefs lost a tight game to the Tennessee Titans 22–21, allowing Derrick Henry to rush for 156 yards. The loss extended their NFL record for most consecutive home playoff losses to six. The game marked the end of Alex Smith's five-year tenure with the Chiefs, as he was traded to the Washington Redskins a few weeks later.

=== The Kelce—Mahomes era (2017–present) ===
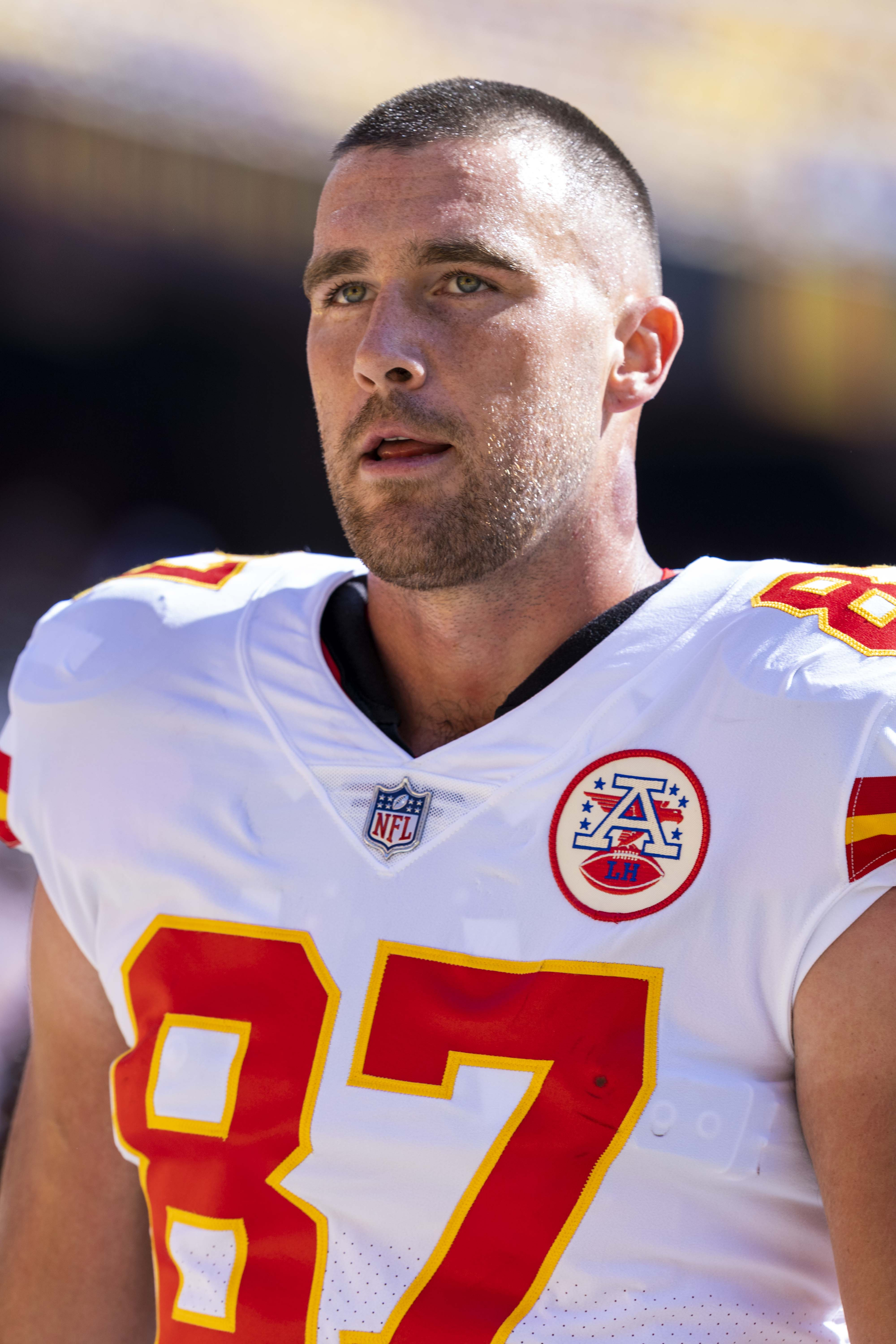
Travis Kelce holds the NFL records for most consecutive 1,000 yards seasons (7), most receiving yards in a season (1,416) and most playoff receiving touchdowns (19) for a tight end.

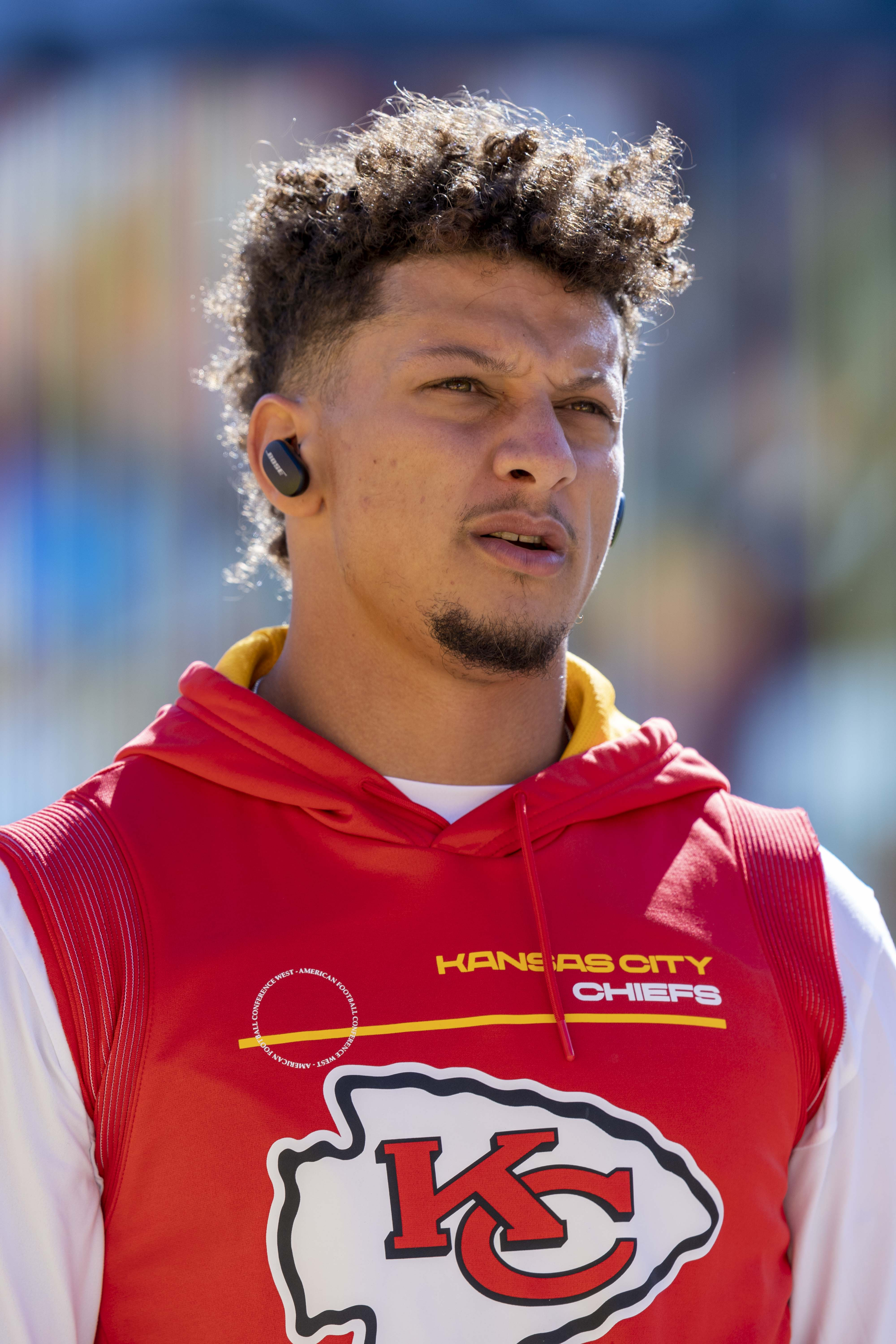
Quarterback Patrick Mahomes is a two-time NFL MVP and holds the record for the most offensive all-purpose yards (5,614) by a player in a season.

Patrick Mahomes made his NFL debut and first career start in the December 31, 2017, game against the Denver Broncos. The Chiefs won the game 27–24, with Mahomes going 22 for 35 with 284 yards and one interception.

The Chiefs began the 2018 season with first-year starter Mahomes as their quarterback and finished the regular season with a record of 12–4, clinching the AFC West for the third year in a row and the AFC's top seed. This included victories over division rivals Los Angeles Chargers, Oakland Raiders and Denver Broncos (twice), along with important conference victories over the Pittsburgh Steelers, Cincinnati Bengals, and Jacksonville Jaguars. Their first loss of the season came at the hands of the New England Patriots with a last-second field goal. Their second loss of the season came against the Los Angeles Rams with a final score of 51–54, in which the Kansas City Chiefs made history by becoming the first NFL team to lose a game after scoring more than 50 points. Mahomes finished the season with 5,097 yards and 50 touchdowns, both team records. He became the 11th quarterback to throw for 5,000 yards and the third to throw for 50 touchdowns. He joined Peyton Manning as only the 2nd player in NFL history to throw for 5,000 yards and 50 touchdowns. For his performance during the season, he was named AP NFL MVP, the first Chief to ever win the award.

In the AFC Divisional round on January 12, 2019, the Chiefs defeated the Indianapolis Colts 31–13 to move on to the AFC Championship Game. This marked the Chiefs' first playoff win in Arrowhead Stadium in 25 years. This also enabled the Chiefs to host the AFC Championship Game for the first time ever. The next week, Kansas City's bid for its first Super Bowl berth in 49 years ended with a 37–31 overtime loss to the New England Patriots.

The Chiefs finished the 2019 regular season with a 12–4 record, winning the AFC West division title for the fourth straight year, and clinched the AFC's second seed behind the Baltimore Ravens. The Chiefs defeated the Houston Texans 51–31 in the AFC Divisional Game after falling behind 24–0 at the start of the second quarter with Mahomes throwing for five touchdowns. The Chiefs hosted their second AFC Championship game in consecutive years facing the sixth-seed Tennessee Titans. The Chiefs then defeated the Titans 35–24 and advanced to Super Bowl LIV. This marked their first Super Bowl appearance in 50 years, since Super Bowl IV.

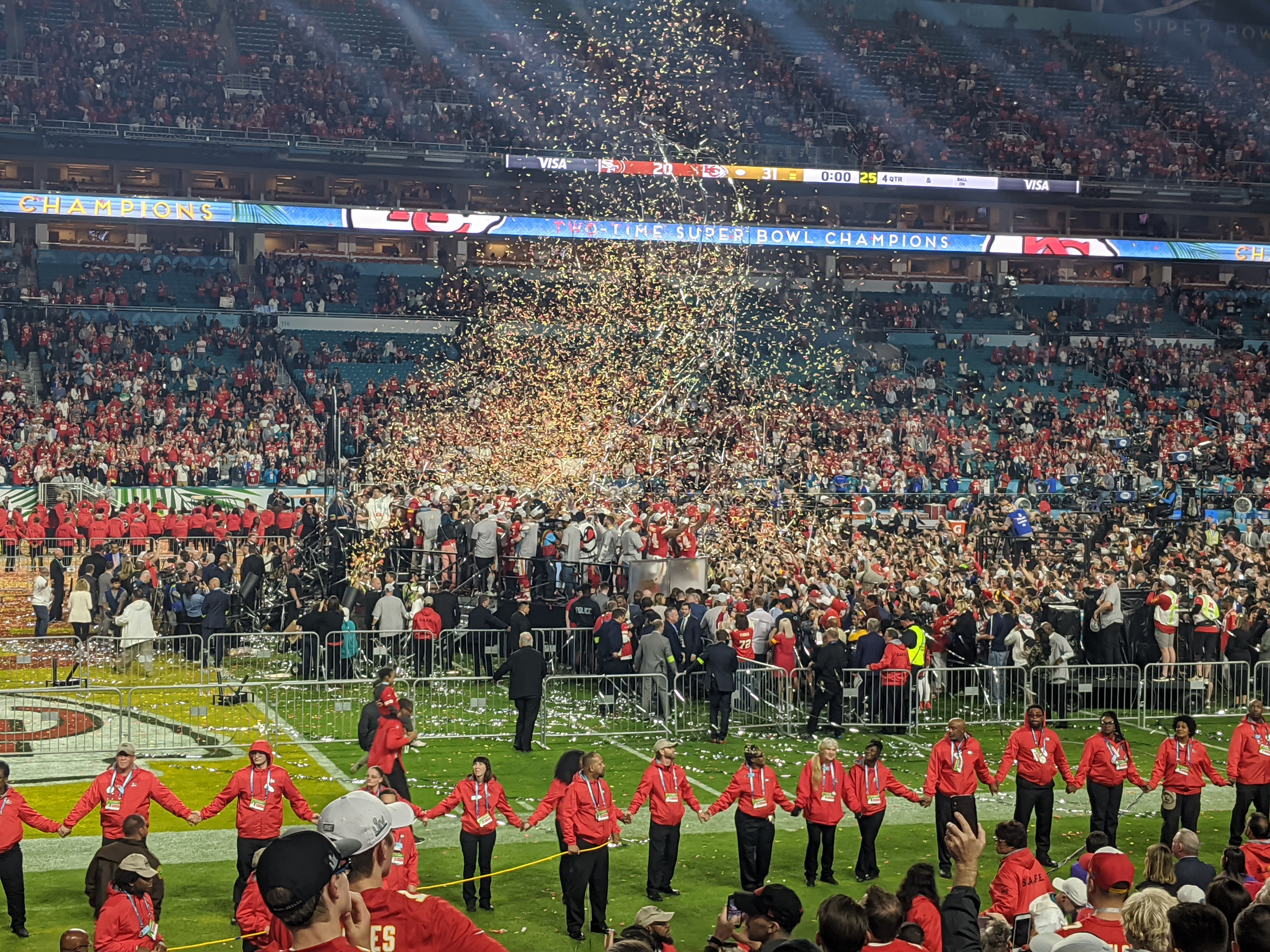
Lombardi Trophy presentation at Super Bowl LIV

On February 2, 2020, in Hard Rock Stadium in Miami Gardens, Florida, the Chiefs played against the NFC's top seed, the San Francisco 49ers. At halftime, the teams were tied at ten points. In the second half, Mahomes threw interceptions in back-to-back drives in the 3rd and 4th quarters, resulting in the 49ers having a 20–10 lead with under 12 minutes remaining in the game. Sparked by a 44-yard completion to Tyreek Hill on 3rd and 15, Mahomes threw touchdowns on successive drives to Travis Kelce and Damien Williams. With a 24–20 lead with under two minutes remaining, Williams had a 38-yard touchdown run to seal the game for the Chiefs. This marked the first time in NFL postseason history that a team faced ten-point deficits in three straight games and won all three by double-digit margins. Mahomes won the Super Bowl Most Valuable Player Award, ending the Chiefs' Super Bowl drought dating to the AFL-NFL Merger.

On July 6, 2020, Mahomes signed a record ten-year, $503-million contract extension keeping him under contract until the conclusion of the 2031 season. The contract is the largest ever signed in North American sports, tripling the previous record (which was for a shorter 5 years, signed by Matt Ryan of the Atlanta Falcons). With their week-14 victory over the Miami Dolphins, the Chiefs clinched their fifth consecutive division title. The victory also gave the Chiefs their first 12–1 record in franchise history. They would later win 14 games for the first time in franchise history. In the playoffs they defeated the Cleveland Browns and Buffalo Bills to win the AFC Championship for the second consecutive year. The Chiefs would face the Tampa Bay Buccaneers in Super Bowl LV at Raymond James Stadium in Tampa, ultimately losing 9–31, failing to score a touchdown in the game.

In their 2021 season, the Chiefs beat the Pittsburgh Steelers 36–10, earning the team's sixth straight AFC West title on December 26, 2021. The Chiefs began their playoff slate with a win against the Pittsburgh Steelers in the Wild Card round, and advanced to play the Buffalo Bills in the divisional round. Their 42–36 victory over Buffalo came in a game sports commentators and analysts dubbed as one of the greatest modern day NFL playoff games. Despite being the first team to host the AFC Championship game for four consecutive seasons, the team finished the season losing 24–27 in overtime to the Cincinnati Bengals.

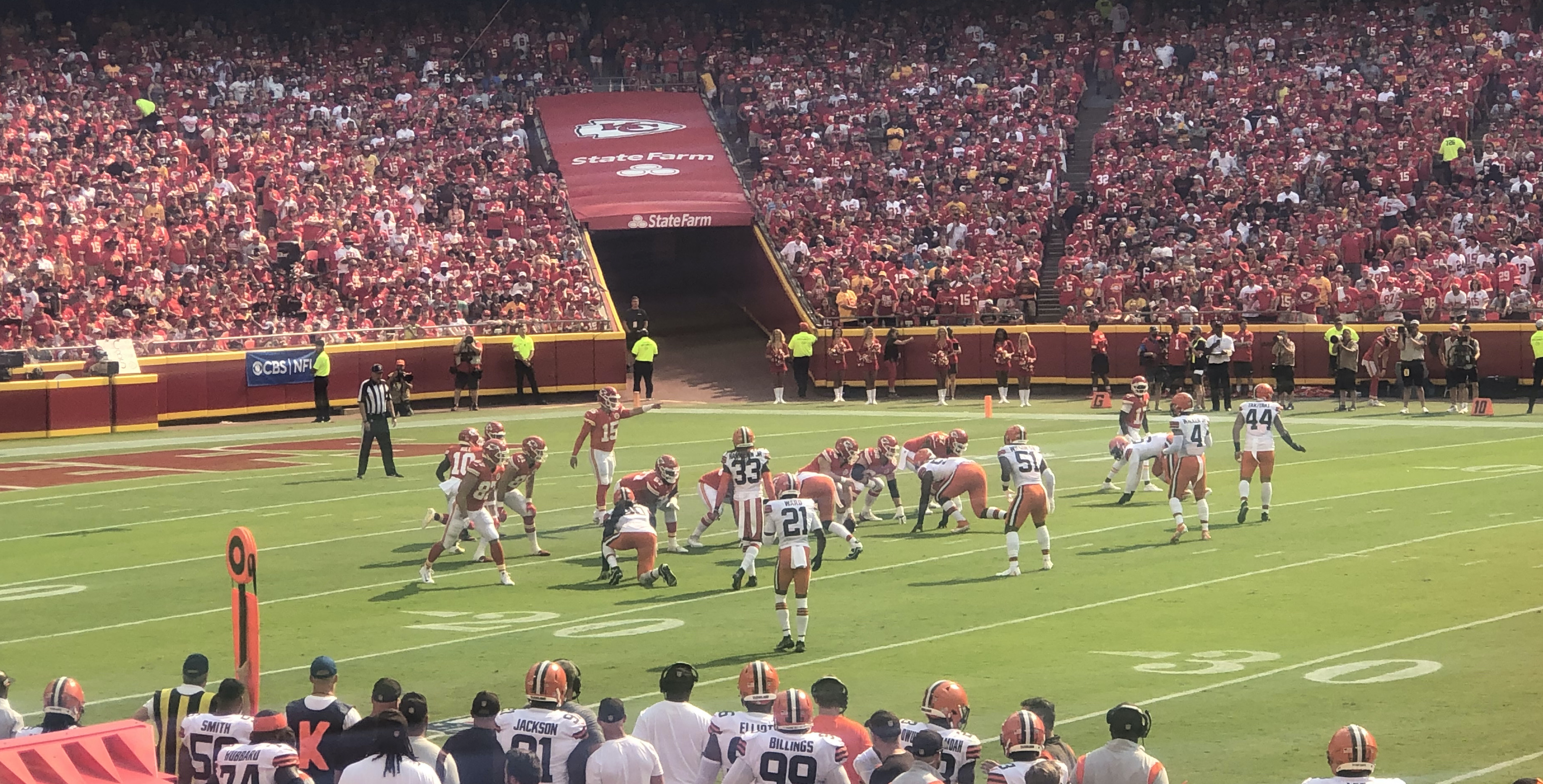
Patrick Mahomes leading the Chiefs offense against the Browns, 2021

The Chiefs began their 2022 season by trading Tyreek Hill to the Miami Dolphins, and instead opting to stock up on picks in the 2022 NFL draft. They finished the season with a 14–3 regular season record, with losses coming from the Colts, Bills, and Bengals. All three losses were by margins of less than four points. The Chiefs won their seventh consecutive AFC West division championship, and secured the #1 seed in the AFC playoffs. The team hosted their fifth consecutive AFC Championship Game, and second consecutive against the Cincinnati Bengals, winning 23–20 on a game-winning field goal from Harrison Butker. In Super Bowl LVII, the Chiefs defeated the Philadelphia Eagles 38–35 again on a field goal from Butker and two fourth-quarter touchdowns using the Corn Dog play. With the victory, Mahomes became the first player since Kurt Warner in 1999 to win both the NFL MVP Award and Super Bowl MVP Award, and lead the league in passing yards in the same season. Head coach Andy Reid won his second Super Bowl championship over the Eagles, the team he had previously led to a Super Bowl appearance.

Entering the 2023 season as defending champions, the Chiefs failed to improve on their 14–3 record from the previous season, despite this they secured their eleventh consecutive winning season and became division champions for the eighth consecutive season. Their overall record was 11–6, their least successful record under quarterback Patrick Mahomes. In the playoffs, the Chiefs defeated the Miami Dolphins 26–7 in the wildcard round in frigid weather. In the divisional round, the team held on to a narrow 27–24 win over the Buffalo Bills on the road. This was the Chiefs third playoff win in four years over the Bills. They made their sixth consecutive AFC Championship Game appearance, but their first on the road, defeating the Baltimore Ravens 17–10 to advance to their fourth Super Bowl in five years. In a rematch of Super Bowl LIV, the Chiefs overtime defeat of the San Francisco 49ers 25–22 in Super Bowl LVIII moved the franchise to four Super Bowl titles, becoming the seventh franchise to accomplish that number. This was only the second overtime game in Super Bowl history. This marked the first back-to-back Super Bowl wins since Super Bowl XXXIX, making it three Super Bowl wins in five years.

In 2024, the Chiefs won a franchise record 15 games and received a first round bye. They defeated the Houston Texans 23–14 in the Divisional Round, followed by a 32–29 win over the Buffalo Bills in the AFC Championship Game, becoming the first team in NFL history to win back-to-back Super Bowls, then return to the Super Bowl in the third season. This also made them the first NFL team to appear in seven consecutive conference championships and the first NFL team to appear in five Super Bowls over a six-year period. They faced the Philadelphia Eagles again in Super Bowl LIX, as they had done in Super Bowl LVII, and lost the rematch, 40–22.

The Chiefs' Thanksgiving game against the Dallas Cowboys became the most-watched NFL regular season game on record, drawing 57.2 million viewers. The game was broadcast on CBS and streaming service Paramount+, and peaked with 61.4 million viewers by the game's conclusion. The Chiefs finished the 2025 season with a 6–11 record and 3rd in the AFC West, missing the playoffs for the first time in the Mahomes era.

== Championships ==
The Chiefs have won four Super Bowl Championships. They have won three AFL Championships: two as the Chiefs and one as the Dallas Texans.

=== Super Bowl championships ===
Year	Coach	Super Bowl	Stadium	Location	Opponent	Score	MVP	Record
1969	Hank Stram	IV	Tulane Stadium	New Orleans, Louisiana	Minnesota Vikings	23–7	QB Len Dawson	11–3
2019	Andy Reid	LIV	Hard Rock Stadium	Miami Gardens, Florida	San Francisco 49ers	31–20	QB Patrick Mahomes	12–4
2022	Andy Reid	LVII	State Farm Stadium	Glendale, Arizona	Philadelphia Eagles	38–35	QB Patrick Mahomes	14–3
2023	Andy Reid	LVIII	Allegiant Stadium	Paradise, Nevada	San Francisco 49ers	25–22 (OT)	QB Patrick Mahomes	11–6
Total Super Bowl championships won:								4

=== American Football League championships ===
Year	Coach	Game	Stadium	Location	Opponent	Score	Record
1962	Hank Stram	1962 AFL Championship Game	Jeppesen Stadium	Houston, Texas	Houston Oilers	20–17	12–3
1966	Hank Stram	1966 AFL Championship Game	War Memorial Stadium	Buffalo, New York	Buffalo Bills	31–7	12–2–1
1969	Hank Stram	1969 AFL Championship Game	Oakland-Alameda County Coliseum	Oakland, California	Oakland Raiders	17–7	12–3
Total AFL championships won:							3

=== AFC championships ===
Year	Coach	Stadium	Location	Opponent	Score	Record
2019	Andy Reid	Arrowhead Stadium	Kansas City, Missouri	Tennessee Titans	35–24	12–4
2020	Andy Reid	Arrowhead Stadium	Kansas City, Missouri	Buffalo Bills	38–24	14–2
2022	Andy Reid	Arrowhead Stadium	Kansas City, Missouri	Cincinnati Bengals	23–20	14–3
2023	Andy Reid	M&T Bank Stadium	Baltimore, Maryland	Baltimore Ravens	17–10	11–6
2024	Andy Reid	Arrowhead Stadium	Kansas City, Missouri	Buffalo Bills	32–29	15–2
Total AFC championships won:						5

== Logos and uniforms ==
When the Texans began playing in 1960, the team's logo consisted of the state of Texas in white with a yellow star marking the location of the city of Dallas. Originally, Hunt chose Columbia blue and orange for the Texans' uniforms, but Bud Adams chose Columbia blue and scarlet for his Houston Oilers franchise. Hunt reverted to red and gold for the Texans' uniforms, which even after the team moved to Kansas City, remain as the franchise's colors to this day.

The state of Texas on the team's helmet was replaced by an arrowhead design originally sketched by Lamar Hunt on a napkin. Hunt's inspiration for the interlocking "KC" design was the "SF" inside of an oval on the San Francisco 49ers helmets. Unlike the 49ers' logo, Kansas City's overlapping initials appear inside a white arrowhead instead of an oval and are surrounded by a thin black outline. From 1960 to 1973, the Chiefs had grey facemask bars on their helmets, but changed to white facemasks in 1974, making them one of the first teams (alongside the San Diego Chargers, who introduced a yellow facemask that same year) in the NFL to use a non-gray facemask.

The Chiefs' uniform design has essentially remained the same throughout the club's history with only four minor changes occurring. It consists of a red helmet, and either red or white jerseys with the opposite color numbers and names. White pants were used with both jerseys from 1960 to 1967, and 1989 to 1999. Beginning in 2009, during the Pioli/Haley era, the team has alternated between white and red pants for road games during the season. Until September 15, 2013, the Chiefs always wore white pants with their red jerseys. The Chiefs do not have an official alternate jersey, although unofficial alternate jerseys are sold for retail.

The Chiefs wore their white jerseys with white pants at home for the 2006 season opener against the Cincinnati Bengals. The logic behind the uniform selection that day was that the Bengals would have to wear their black uniform on a day when hot temperatures were forecast.

In 2007, the Kansas City Chiefs honored Lamar Hunt and the AFL with a special patch. It features the AFL's logo from the 1960s with Hunt's "LH" initials inside the football. In 2008, the patch became permanently affixed to the left chest of both Kansas City's home and away jerseys.

In select games for the 2009 season, the Chiefs, as well as the other founding teams of the American Football League, wore a "throwback" uniform to celebrate the AFL's 50th anniversary.

For the first time in team history, the Chiefs wore red jerseys with red pants, forming an all-red combo in their home opener against the Dallas Cowboys on September 15, 2013. The all-red uniform is now an official uniform combination and has been used multiple times since. It is commonly used for prime-time games at home. The all-red look also served as the basis for the Chiefs' Color Rush design.

== Arrowhead Stadium ==
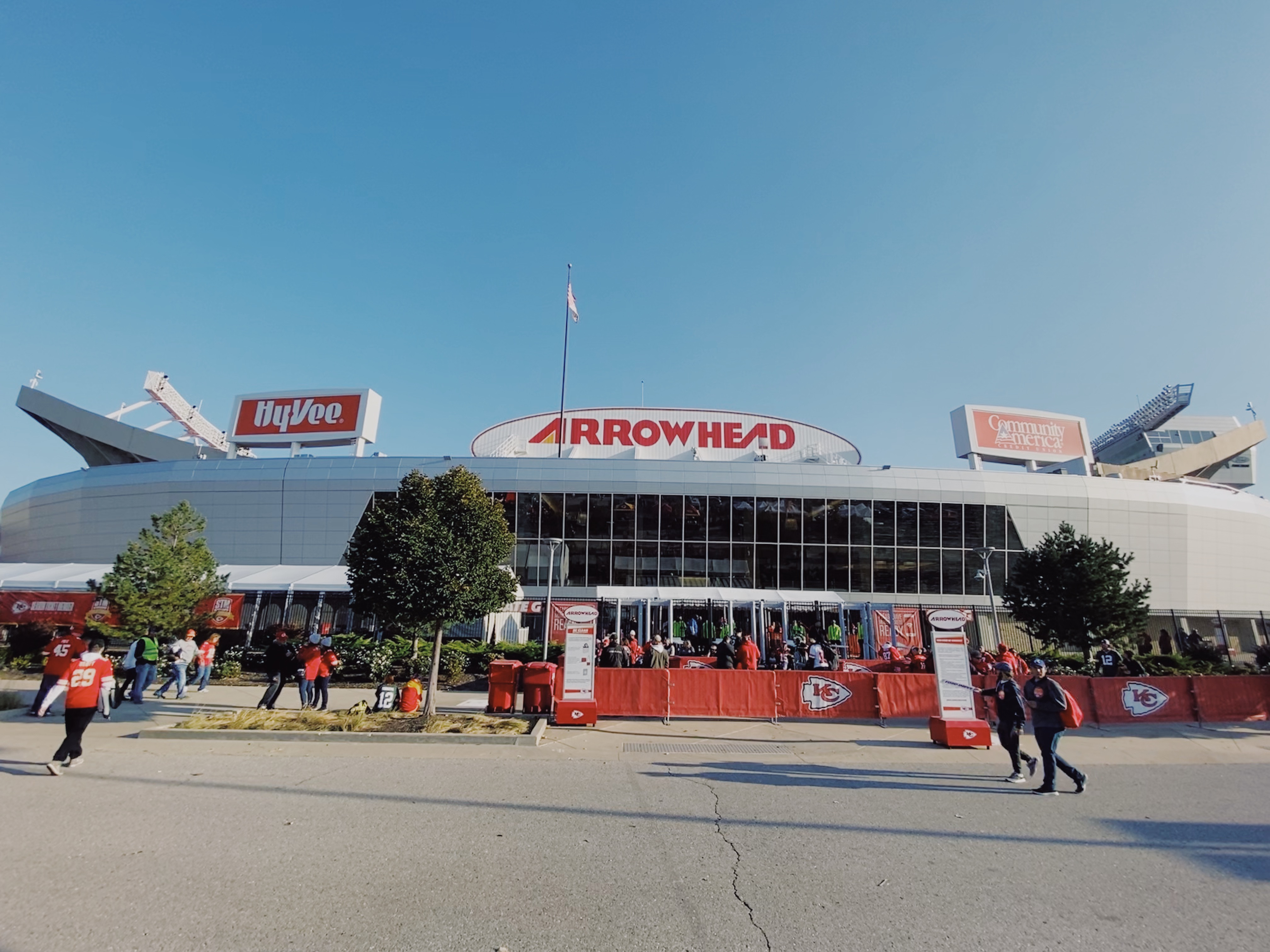
Exterior of Arrowhead Stadium in 2019

Arrowhead Stadium has been the Chiefs' home field since 1972 and has a capacity of 76,416, which makes it the fifth-largest stadium in the NFL. The stadium underwent a $375 million renovation, completed in mid-2010, which included new luxury boxes, wider concourses and enhanced amenities. The stadium renovation was paid for by $250 million in taxpayer money and $125 million from the Hunt Family. The stadium cost $53 million to build in 1972, and an average ticket in 2009 costs $81. Aramark serves as the stadium's concession provider and T-Mobile, Anheuser-Busch and Coca-Cola are major corporate sponsors.

Dating back to the Chiefs' home opener in 1991 to mid-2009, the Chiefs had 155 consecutive sellout games. The streak ended with the final home game of the 2009 season against the Cleveland Browns, resulting in the first local TV blackout in over 19 years. Arrowhead has been called one of the world's finest stadiums and has long held a reputation for being one of the toughest and loudest outdoor stadiums for opposing players to play in. All noise is directly attributed to its fans and was once measured at 116 decibels by the Acoustical Design Group of Mission, Kansas. By way of comparison, take-off of aircraft may lead to a sound level of 106 decibels at the ground. Sports Illustrated named Arrowhead Stadium the "toughest place to play" for opposing teams in 2005. The tailgate party environment outside the stadium on gameday has been compared to a "college football" atmosphere. Arrowhead Stadium features frequent fly-overs from a B-2 Spirit stealth bomber from nearby Whiteman Air Force Base. Since the 1994 NFL season, the stadium has had a natural grass playing surface. From 1972 to 1993, the stadium had an artificial AstroTurf surface.

During the game against the Oakland Raiders on October 13, 2013, Arrowhead Stadium once again became the loudest stadium in the world when the fans set the Guinness Book of World Records record for loudest crowd in an outdoor stadium (137.5 dB), breaking the record set by the Seattle Seahawks just four weeks earlier. A few weeks after, Seattle re-gained the record by reaching a noise level of 137.6 decibels. Chiefs fans have reclaimed the record once again on September 29, 2014, on ESPN's Monday Night Football against the New England Patriots, the fans recorded a sound reading of 142.2 decibels.

The stadium has been officially named GEHA Field at Arrowhead Stadium (pronounced G.E.H.A.) since 2021. The stadium was renamed after GEHA signed a naming rights deal with the Chiefs.

On December 22, 2025, the Chiefs announced they will leave Arrowhead Stadium and move to Kansas City, Kansas, with an agreement to build a new stadium in Wyandotte County, which is planned to open in time for the start of the 2031 NFL season.

== Training camp and practice facility ==
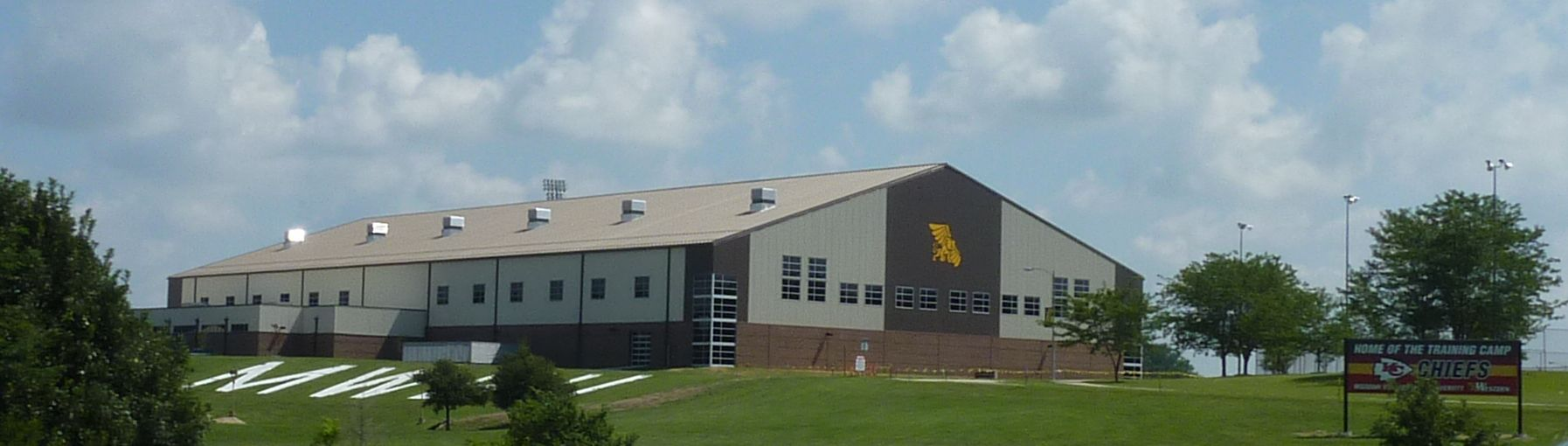
Summer camp at Spratt Stadium at Missouri Western

When the franchise was based in Dallas, the team conducted their inaugural training camp at the New Mexico Military Institute in Roswell, New Mexico. They moved camp to Southern Methodist University, owner Lamar Hunt's alma mater, for 1961 and continued to practice there until 1965. From 1966 to 1971, the Chiefs practiced in Swope Park in Kansas City, and from 1972 to 1991 held camp at William Jewell College in Clay County, Missouri–where Lamar Hunt had extensive business dealings including Worlds of Fun, Oceans of Fun and SubTropolis.

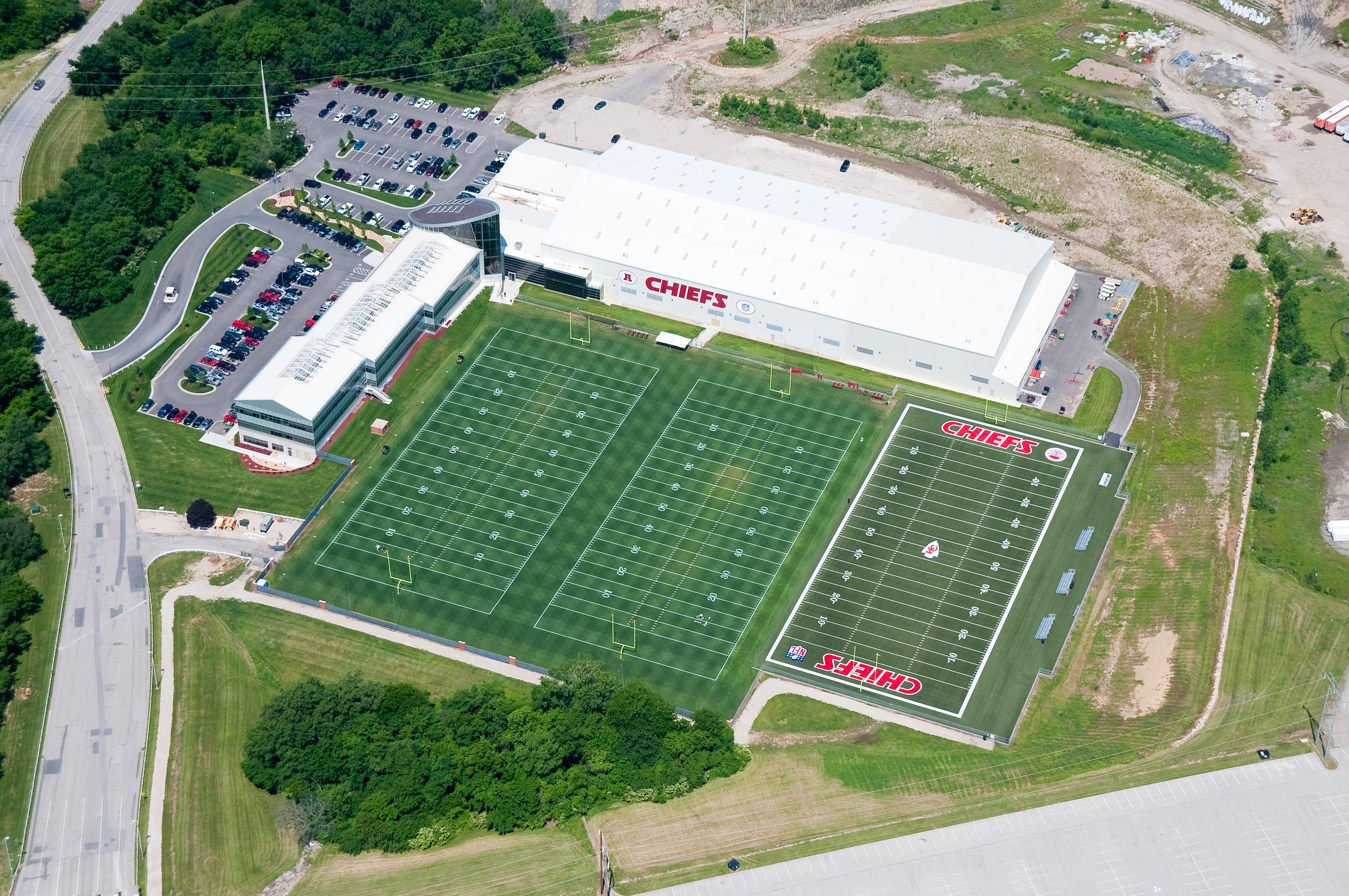
Chiefs Practice Facility near Arrowhead Stadium

From 1992 to 2009 the Chiefs conducted summer training camp at the University of Wisconsin–River Falls in River Falls, Wisconsin. The Chiefs' 2007 training camp was documented in the HBO/NFL Films documentary reality television series, Hard Knocks. After the passage of a $25 million state tax credit proposal, the Chiefs moved their training camp to Missouri Western State University in St. Joseph, Missouri, in 2010. The bulk of the tax credits went for improvements to Arrowhead Stadium with $10 million applied to the move to Missouri Western. A climate-controlled, 120-yard NFL regulation grass indoor field, and office space for the Chiefs was constructed at Missouri Western adjacent to the school's Spratt Stadium before the 2010 season.

Outside of training camp and during the regular season, the Chiefs conduct practices at their own training facility nearby Arrowhead Stadium. The facility is located near the Raytown Road entrance to the Truman Sports Complex just east of Interstate 435 and features three outdoor fields (two grass and one artificial turf) as well as an indoor facility with its own full-size field.

On December 22, 2025, the Chiefs announced plans to move their headquarters and training facility to Olathe, Johnson County, Kansas.

== Rivalries ==
=== Divisional rivals ===
==== Oakland/Los Angeles/Las Vegas Raiders ====
The rivalry between the Chiefs and the Las Vegas Raiders is considered as one of the NFL's most bitter, extending back into the infancy of the AFL. Most notably during the era; both the Chiefs and Raiders appeared in the first two Super Bowl games. Since the AFL was established in 1960, the Chiefs and Raiders have shared the same division, first being the AFL Western Conference, and since the AFL–NFL merger, the AFC West. The Chiefs lead the regular season series 73–55–2 as of the end of the 2023 season, including a 2–1 playoff record against Las Vegas.

==== San Diego/Los Angeles Chargers ====
A historic divisional battle for the Chiefs; the rivalry with the Los Angeles Chargers reignited during the 2020s as matchups would feature an offensive battle between Patrick Mahomes and Chargers' pro-bowl quarterback Justin Herbert. The Chiefs lead 69–58–1 as of the end of the 2023 season, but the Chargers won 17–0 in the only playoff meeting between the two teams, a 1992 AFC wild card game.

==== Denver Broncos ====
Chiefs lead 72–56 as of the 2023 season, which included a run of 16 straight wins, but the Broncos won the only playoff game between the two teams, a 1997 AFC Divisional game.

=== Conference ===
==== Buffalo Bills ====
The series originated during the American Football League's inaugural season in 1960, as both the Kansas City Chiefs, then known as the Dallas Texans, and Buffalo Bills were charter teams in the league. Despite being in two different divisions since their founding in 1960, the Bills and Chiefs have had many notable moments in NFL postseason history, most notably the 1966 AFL Championship Game, the 1993 AFC Championship Game between Kelly and Montana, the 2021 AFC Divisional playoff game (known especially for the infamous '13 Seconds'), and the 2023 AFC Divisional playoff game (known as 'Wide Right II'). Since 2020, the rivalry has redeveloped as both teams consistently contended for the AFC title. A rivalry has also developed between Bills quarterback Josh Allen and Chiefs quarterback Patrick Mahomes, with many comparing it to the former rivalry between Tom Brady and Peyton Manning. At the end of the 2024–25 season, Buffalo leads the series 30–26–1, but Kansas City leads the playoff series 5–2. Of the seven playoff meetings the teams have contested, four were AFL/AFC championship games.

=== Other ===
==== Preston Road Trophy: Dallas Cowboys ====
Despite his feud with the Cowboys during the AFL era, Lamar Hunt was close friends with Jerry Jones, who bought the Cowboys in 1989. The two also lived in the same neighborhood on a street called Preston Road.

Hoping to add a competitive flair to their friendship, Hunt created a trophy called the "Preston Road Trophy" in 1998. It is awarded to the winner of the Chiefs–Cowboys game, regardless of preseason or regular season. The two often played pranks on each other when the trophy changed hands, while Hunt put it on his bedroom window when in the Chiefs' possession so that Jones had to drive past it.

As of the 2025 season, the Cowboys hold the trophy.

==== Missouri Governor's Cup: St. Louis Cardinals/St. Louis Rams (retired) ====
The Chiefs established cross-state rivalries with NFL teams in St. Louis, Missouri, with a trophy being awarded to the winner of each game. From 1960 to 1988, the Chiefs occasionally played the St. Louis Cardinals before they moved to Arizona with the Chiefs winning that series 3-1-1. The series found new life from 1995 to 2015, when the Rams played in St. Louis, ending upon the team's return to Los Angeles in 2016. The Chiefs never lost this series, winning all six games.

== Mascots and cheerleaders ==
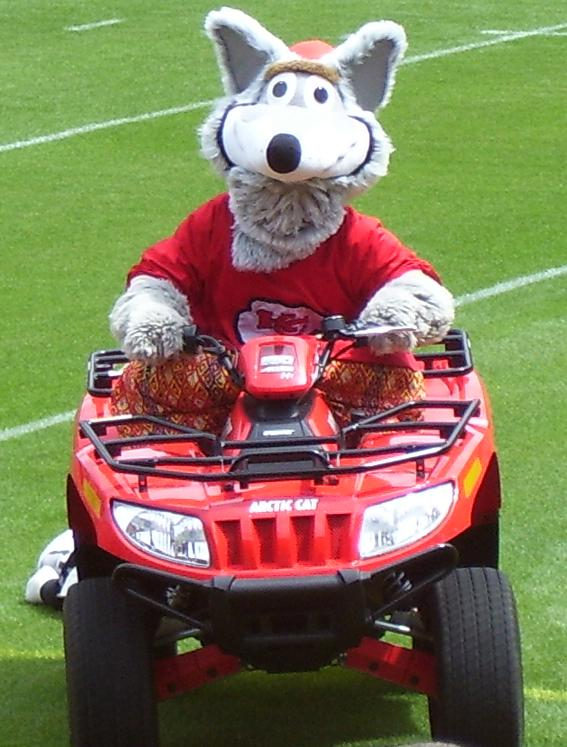
K. C. Wolf, the Chiefs' mascot since 1989

The Chiefs' first mascot was Warpaint, a nickname given to several breeds of pinto horse. Warpaint was the team's mascot from 1963 to 1988. The first Warpaint (born in 1955, died in 1992) was ridden bareback by rider Bob Johnson who wore a full Native American headdress. Warpaint circled the field at the beginning of each Chiefs home game and performed victory laps after each Chiefs touchdown. On September 20, 2009, a new Warpaint horse was unveiled at the Chiefs' home opener. Warpaint was ridden by a cheerleader in its return. The Chiefs again retired Warpaint in 2021 as a part of their commitment to stop the use of Native American imagery.

In the mid-1980s, the Chiefs featured a short-lived unnamed "Indian man" mascot which was later scrapped in 1988. Since 1989 the cartoon-like K. C. Wolf, portrayed by Dan Meers in a wolf costume, has served as the team's mascot. The mascot was named after the Chiefs' "Wolfpack", a group of rabid fans from the team's days at Municipal Stadium. K. C. Wolf is one of the most popular NFL mascots and was the league's first mascot inducted into the Mascot Hall of Fame in 2006.

The Chiefs have employed a cheerleading squad since the team's inception in 1960. In the team's early days, the all-female squad was referred to as the Chiefettes. In addition to the Cheerleaders, in the early 1970s, there was also a dance/drill team that performed for pre-game and halftime. From 1986 to 1992, the cheerleader squad featured a mix of men and women. From 1993 to 2019, the all-female squad has been known as the Chiefs Cheerleaders, and in 2020, one male joined the team.

== Players ==
=== Roster ===
Kansas City Chiefs roster
**Quarterbacks (QB)**: 6 Justin Fields; 15 Patrick Mahomes; 19 Garrett Nussmeier; **Running backs (RB)**: 10 Emmett Johnson; 24 Brashard Smith; 47 Ben VanSumeren FB; 9 Kenneth Walker III; **Wide receivers (WR)**: 13 Cyrus Allen; 81 Nikko Remigio RS; 4 Rashee Rice; 11 Jalen Royals; 2 Tyquan Thornton; 1 Xavier Worthy; **Tight ends (TE)**: 88 Jake Briningstool; 83 Noah Gray; 87 Travis Kelce; 12 Jared Wiley	**Offensive linemen (OL)**: 70 Kahlil Benson T; 66 Mike Caliendo G; 73 Joshua Ezeudu T; 52 Creed Humphrey C; 77 Jaylon Moore T; 64 Hunter Nourzad C; 61 Diego Pounds T; 71 Josh Simmons T; 65 Trey Smith G; 76 Kingsley Suamataia G; **Defensive linemen (DL)**: 91 Felix Anudike-Uzomah DE; 94 Bryson Eason DT; 97 Ashton Gillotte DE; 95 Chris Jones DT; 56 George Karlaftis DE; 54 Jack Pyburn DE; 51 R Mason Thomas DE; 92 Khyiris Tonga NT; 99 Peter Woods	**Linebackers (LB)**: 31 Jeffrey Bassa; 32 Nick Bolton; 43 Jack Cochrane; 23 Drue Tranquill; **Defensive backs (DB)**: 22 Jadon Canady CB; 27 Chamarri Conner S; 5 Mansoor Delane CB; 8 Kristian Fulton CB; 17 Alohi Gilman S; 21 Jaden Hicks S; 29 Xavier Nwankpa S; 30 Christian Roland-Wallace CB; 38 L'Jarius Sneed CB; 20 Nohl Williams CB; **Special teams (ST)**: 14 Matt Araiza P; 7 Harrison Butker K; 41 James Winchester LS	**Practice squad**: 85 Andrew Armstrong WR; 35 Nate Carter RB; 48 Cole Christiansen LB; 75 Ethan Driskell T; 80 Omari Evans WR; 96 Marcus Harris DT; 49 Michael Heldman DE; 45 Cam Jones LB; 26 Kader Kohou CB; 50 Pete Nygra C; 89 Thomas Odukoya TE (IPP); 90 Emmanuel Ogbah DE; 34 Jaydn Ott RB; 46 D'Arco Perkins-McAllister CB; 25 DeShon Singleton S; 39 Melvin Smith CB; 57 Tyreke Smith DE; **Reserve**: 8 Jeff Caldwell WR (IR); 40 Ethan Downs LB (IR); 84 John Michael Gyllenborg TE (IR); 82 Jimmy Holiday WR (IR); 44 Cooper McDonald LB (IR); 55 Omarr Norman-Lott DT (PUP); 73 Matt Waletzko T (IR) 53 active, 16 practice squad (1 IPP), 7 reserve As of September 30, 2026. Rookies in italics.; Roster; Depth chart; Transactions

=== Retired numbers ===
Kansas City Chiefs retired numbers
No.	Player	Position	Tenure
**3**	Jan Stenerud	K	1967–1979
**16**	Len Dawson	QB	1962–1975
**18**	**Emmitt Thomas**	CB	1966–1978
**28**	Abner Haynes	RB	1960–1964
**33**	Stone Johnson ^{1} ^{2}	RB	1963
**36**	Mack Lee Hill ^{2}	RB	1964–1965
**58**	**Derrick Thomas** ^{2}	LB	1989–1999
**63**	**Willie Lanier**	LB	1967–1977
**78**	**Bobby Bell**	LB	1963–1974
**86**	**Buck Buchanan**	DT	1963–1975
^{1} Never on a Chiefs regular season roster. His number was retired after his death after an injury in a preseason game in 1963.^{2} Number was posthumously retired. Names in **bold** spent entire playing career with the Dallas Texans/Kansas City Chiefs. The number 37 has not been worn since the death of Joe Delaney. Number 58 was not issued after the death of Derrick Thomas until it was officially retired in 2009. The numbers 16 and 28 are the only numbers to have been worn by a single player (both Dawson and Haynes respectively).

=== Pro Football Hall of Fame members ===
Twenty-five members of the Pro Football Hall of Fame spent at least some portion of their career with the Chiefs. Thirteen spent the majority of the career with the Chiefs. Ten of the Chiefs in the Hall of Fame were involved with the Chiefs during their Super Bowl Championship season of 1969. The Chiefs have 3 contributors, 3 coaches, and 18 players in the Hall of Fame. Derrick Thomas is the only Chief in the Hall of Fame that was inducted posthumously. Listed below are only people whose tenure with the Chiefs is their reason for induction, not former Chiefs coaches inducted as a player, the only exception being Emmitt Thomas who was inducted as a player for the Chiefs and later become an assistant coach for the team.

**Kansas City Chiefs Hall of Fame enshrinees**
Players
No.	Name	Position	Tenure	Inducted
78	**Bobby Bell** ^{1} ^{2}	LB	1963–1974	1983
63	**Willie Lanier** ^{1} ^{2}	LB	1967–1977	1986
16	**Len Dawson** ^{2} ^{3}	QB	1963–1975	1987
86	**Buck Buchanan** ^{1} ^{2}	DT	1963–1975	1990
3	**Jan Stenerud** ^{1} ^{2} ^{3}	K	1967–1979	1991
53	Mike Webster	C	1989–1990	1997
19	Joe Montana	QB	1993–1994	2000
32	Marcus Allen	RB	1993–1997	2003
1	Warren Moon	QB	1999–2000	2006
18	**Emmitt Thomas** ^{1} ^{2}	CB	1966–1978	2008
58	**Derrick Thomas**	LB	1989–1999	2009
77	Willie Roaf	T	2002–2005	2012
61	**Curley Culp** ^{1} ^{2} ^{3}	DT	1968–1974	2013
68	**Will Shields**	G	1993–2006	2015
8	Morten Andersen	K	2002–2003	2017
88	**Tony Gonzalez** ^{3}	TE	1997–2008	2019
24	Ty Law	CB	2006–2007	2019
42	**Johnny Robinson**^{1} ^{2}	S	1960–1971	2019
24	Darrelle Revis	CB	2017	2023
69	Jared Allen	DE	2004–2007	2025
Coaches and contributors
Name		Position	Tenure	Inducted
**Lamar Hunt**		Founder of franchise and American Football League	1960–2006	1972
Marv Levy		Head coach	1978–1982	2001
**Hank Stram** ^{1} ^{2} ^{3}		Head coach	1960–1974	2003
Bill Polian		Contributor	1978–1982	2015
Bobby Beathard		Contributor	1963, 1966–1967	2018
Dick Vermeil		Head coach	2001–2005	2022
^{1} Began career in the American Football League.^{2} Member of 1969 Super Bowl championship team.^{3} Spent majority of their career with the Chiefs (names in **bold**).

=== Chiefs Hall of Honor ===
Established in 1970, the Chiefs Hall of Honor has inducted a new member, with the exception of the 1983 and 2020 seasons, every year to honor their players, coaches, and contributors in an annual ceremony. The requirements for induction are that a player, coach, or contributor must have been with the Chiefs for four seasons and been out of the NFL for four seasons at the time of induction. There are some exceptions, such as Joe Delaney and Derrick Thomas, Delaney was with the team for only two seasons before his death, Thomas was inducted 1 year after his death in January 2000 (2 years after his final season). The Chiefs have the second-most enshrinees of any NFL team in their team Hall of Fame behind the Green Bay Packers, who have enshrined over 100 players and team contributors over the years in the Green Bay Packers Hall of Fame. Nineteen players and the coach of the Super Bowl IV championship team have been inducted into the ring of honor. Three players were posthumously inducted, Derrick Thomas, Joe Delaney, and Mack Lee Hill.

Chiefs Hall of Honor
Inducted	No.	Player	Position	Tenure
1970	—	Lamar Hunt	Team founder/Owner	1960–2006
1971	36	Mack Lee Hill*	RB	1964–1965
1972	75	Jerry Mays	DT	1961–1970
1973	84	Fred Arbanas	TE	1962–1970
1974	42	Johnny Robinson	S	1960–1971
1975	88	Chris Burford	WR	1960–1967
1976	55	E. J. Holub	C/LB	1961–1970
1977	77	Jim Tyrer	T	1961–1973
1978	21	Mike Garrett	RB	1966–1970
1979	16	Len Dawson	QB	1963–1975
1980	78	Bobby Bell	LB	1963–1974
1981	86	Buck Buchanan	DT	1963–1975
1982	89	Otis Taylor	WR	1965–1975
1983	No induction			
1984	71	Ed Budde	G	1963–1976
1985	63	Willie Lanier	LB	1967–1977
1986	18	Emmitt Thomas	CB	1966–1978
1987	—	Hank Stram	Coach	1960–1974
1988	44	Jerrel Wilson	P	1963–1977
1989	14	Ed Podolak	RB	1969–1977
1990	51	Jim Lynch	LB	1967–1977
1991	28	Abner Haynes	RB	1960–1964
1992	3	Jan Stenerud	K	1967–1979
1993	69	Sherrill Headrick	LB	1960–1967
1994	58	Jack Rudnay	C	1969–1982
1995	32	Curtis McClinton	RB	1962–1969
1996	20	Deron Cherry	S	1981–1991
1997	73	Dave Hill	T	1963–1974
1998	67	Art Still	DE	1978–1987
1999	34	Lloyd Burruss	S	1981–1991
2000	35	Christian Okoye	RB	1987–1992
2001	58	Derrick Thomas*	LB	1989–1999
2002	76	John Alt	T	1984–1996
2003	59	Gary Spani	LB	1978–1986
2004	37	Joe Delaney*	RB	1981–1982
2005	—	Jack Steadman	President/GM	1960–1989
2006	90	Neil Smith	DE	1988–1996
2007	29	Albert Lewis	CB	1983–1993
2008	61	Curley Culp	DT	1968–1974
2009	8	Nick Lowery	K	1980–1993
2010	—	Marty Schottenheimer	Coach	1989–1998
2011	31	Kevin Ross	CB	1984–1993, 1997
2012	68	Will Shields	G	1993–2006
2013	26	Gary Barbaro	S	1976–1982
2014	31	Priest Holmes	RB	2001–2007
2015	24	Gary Green	CB	1977–1983
2016	49	Tony Richardson	FB	1995–2005
2017	88	Carlos Carson	WR	1980–1989
2018	88	Tony Gonzalez	TE	1997–2008
2019	54	Brian Waters	G	2000–2010
2020	No induction			
2021	61	Tim Grunhard	C	1990–2000
2022	38	Kimble Anders	FB	1991–2000
2023	82	Dante Hall	WR†	2000–2006
2024	91	Tamba Hali	DE/LB	2006–2017
2025	63	Bill Maas	DE/DT	1984–1992
2026	56	Derrick Johnson	LB	2005–2017

*Posthumous induction
†Hall's primary position was wide receiver and is listed in the Chiefs Hall of Honor as a receiver. However, he was inducted because of his accomplishments as a return specialist.

=== Records ===
Three Chiefs players own major NFL records. Patrick Mahomes owns the record for career quarterback rating with a minimum of 1,500 attempts with 103.9, Derrick Thomas owns the record for sacks in a single game with 7 which he accomplished in 1990, and Travis Kelce owns the record for career receptions in the playoffs. Additionally, Tony Gonzalez, who spent the majority his career with the Chiefs, is the career receiving yards and receptions leader among tight ends. Chiefs players own several less notable records, for example, Mahomes owns the record for fastest quarterback to 100 career passing touchdowns. For a list of franchise records, see List of Kansas City Chiefs records

=== Individual league awards ===
National Football League Most Valuable Player
(2)

2018: Patrick Mahomes, QB
2022: Patrick Mahomes, QB

Defensive Rookie of the Year
(4)

1984: Bill Maas, DT
1989: Derrick Thomas, OLB
1992: Dale Carter, CB
2015: Marcus Peters, CB

Offensive Player of the Year
(2)

2002: Priest Holmes, RB
2018: Patrick Mahomes, QB

Super Bowl MVP
(4)

1969: Len Dawson, QB (IV)
2019: Patrick Mahomes, QB (LIV)
2022: Patrick Mahomes, QB (LVII)
2023: Patrick Mahomes, QB (LVIII)

Walter Payton Man of the Year Award
(5)

1972: Willie Lanier, MLB
1973: Len Dawson, QB
1993: Derrick Thomas, OLB
2003: Will Shields, G
2009: Brian Waters, G

Comeback Player of the Year
(1)

2015: Eric Berry, S

== Head coaches ==
Thirteen head coaches have worked for the Texans/Chiefs franchise since their first season in 1960. Hank Stram, the team's first head coach, led the Chiefs to three AFL championship victories and two appearances in the Super Bowl. Stram was the team's longest-tenured head coach, holding the position from 1960 to 1974. Marty Schottenheimer was hired in 1989 and led Kansas City to seven playoff appearances in his ten seasons as head coach. Schottenheimer had the best winning percentage (.634) of all Chiefs coaches. Gunther Cunningham was on the Chiefs' coaching staff in various positions from 1995 to 2008, and was the team's head coach in between stints as the team's defensive coordinator. Dick Vermeil coached the team to a franchise-best 9–0 start in the 2003 season. Of the ten Chiefs coaches, Hank Stram, Marv Levy, and Dick Vermeil have been elected into the Pro Football Hall of Fame, Levy is more well known for his time with the Buffalo Bills. Herm Edwards was the team's head coach from 2006 to 2008, compiling a 15–33 record and a franchise worst 6–26 record over a two-year span. Todd Haley compiled a 19–26 record with the team from 2009 to 2011, including an AFC West division title in 2010. Haley was fired with three games left in the 2011 season. Romeo Crennel was named interim coach, and was promoted to full-time coach in January 2012. Crennel was fired on Monday, December 31, 2012, after finishing the 2012 season with a 2–14 record. On January 5, 2013, the Chiefs hired Andy Reid to be their next head coach. In Reid's tenure, the Chiefs have never had a sub-.500 season, making the playoffs in 10 of his 11 seasons as head coach, winning the division six times, and twice having two consecutive Super Bowl appearances, and three wins. With a 21–14 victory over the Miami Dolphins, on November 5, 2023, in Frankfurt Germany, Andy Reid tied former Chiefs head coach Hank Stram on the franchise's all-time regular season wins list with 124 victories.

== Ownership and administration ==
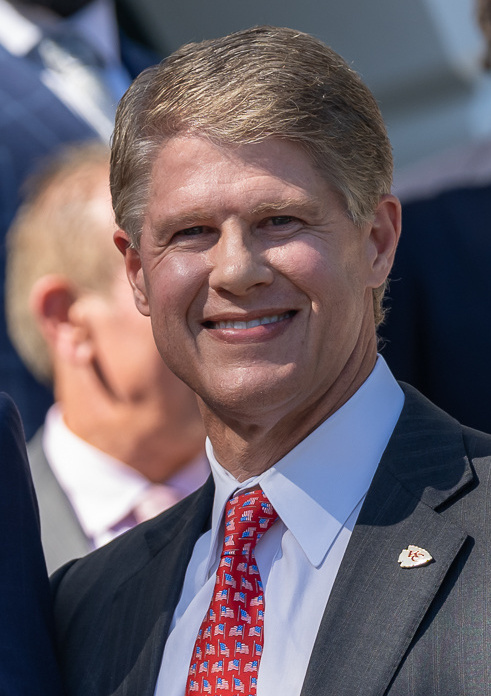
Chairman of the board and co-owner Clark Hunt

The franchise was founded in 1959 by Lamar Hunt after a failed attempt by Hunt to purchase an NFL franchise and move them to Texas. Hunt remained the team's owner until his death in 2006. The Hunt family kept ownership of the team after Lamar's death and Clark Hunt, Lamar's son, represents the family's interests. While Hunt's official title is CEO and Chairman of the Board, he represents the team at all owner meetings. In 2010, Hunt assumed role as CEO alongside his role as chairman of the board. According to Forbes, the team began the 2024 season valued at $4.85 billion USD, ranking them 24th among the 32 NFL teams.

Owner Lamar Hunt was the team's president from 1960 to 1976. Because of Lamar Hunt's contributions to the NFL, the AFC Championship trophy is named after him. He promoted general manager Jack Steadman to become the team's president in 1977. Steadman held the job until Carl Peterson was hired by Hunt in 1988 to replace him. Peterson resigned the title as team president in 2008. Denny Thum became the team's interim president after Peterson's departure and was officially given the full position in May 2009. Thum resigned from his position on September 14, 2010.

Don Rossi was the team's general manager for half of the 1960 season, resigning in November 1960. Jack Steadman assumed duties from Rossi and was in the position until 1976. Steadman was promoted to team president in 1976 and despite being relieved of those duties in 1988, he remained with the franchise until 2006 in various positions. Jim Schaaf took over for Steadman as general manager until being fired in December 1988. Carl Peterson was hired in 1988 as the team's general manager, chief executive officer and team president. Peterson remained in the position for nineteen years until he announced his resignation from the team in 2008. Denny Thum was interim general manager until January 13, 2009, when the Chiefs named New England Patriots executive Scott Pioli the team's new general manager. Pioli was released in early January after the hiring of Andy Reid, and was replaced by John Dorsey. Pioli's record as the Chief's general manager was 23–41.

On June 22, 2017, the Chiefs fired Dorsey. They hired Brett Veach as the new general manager on July 10, 2017.

=== Staff ===
Kansas City Chiefs staff
Front office: Chairman/CEO – Clark Hunt; President – Mark Donovan; General manager – Brett Veach; Assistant general manager – Chris Shea; Assistant general manager – Mike Bradway; VP of player personnel – Tim Terry; VP of player personnel – Ryne Nutt; Senior personnel executive – Willie Davis; Co-directors of college scouting – Pat Sperduto and David Hinson; Senior college and pro scouting executive – Dru Grigson; Assistant director of football administration amd roster strategy – Jack Wolov; Senior national scouting executive – Terry Delp; Player personnel executive – Jalen Myrick; Senior Football Strategy and Compliance executive – Ryan Herman; Head coaches: Head coach – Andy Reid; Assistant head coach/special teams coordinator – Dave Toub; Offensive coaches: Offensive coordinator – Eric Bieniemy; Pass game coordinator – Joe Bleymaier; Quarterbacks – David Girardi; Assistant quarterbacks – Dan Williams; Running backs – DeMarco Murray; Wide receivers – Chad O'Shea; Tight ends – Tom Melvin; Offensive line – Andy Heck; Assistant offensive line – Corey Matthaei; Offensive quality control – Nate Pagan	Defensive coaches: Defensive coordinator – Steve Spagnuolo; Defensive line – Joe Cullen; Assistant defensive line – Terry Bradden Jr.; Linebackers – Brendan Daly; Outside linebackers – Matt House; Defensive backs – Dave Merritt; Safeties – Andre Curtis; Defensive quality control – Chris Orr; Defensive quality control – C.J. Cox; Special teams coaches: Assistant special teams – Porter Ellett; Coaching support staff: Director of football research and development – Mark Richards; Statistical analysis coordinator – Mike Frazier; Strength and conditioning: Vice President of sports medicine and performance – Rick Burkholder; Head strength and conditioning/director of sports science – Ryan Reynolds; Assistant strength and conditioning – Greg Carbin; Assistant strength and conditioning – Nick Cassetta; Assistant strength and conditioning – Spencer Reid; → Coaching staff → Front office → More NFL staffs

== Media ==
Kansas City radio station KFNZ-FM (96.5) is the flagship station for The Chiefs Football Radio Network. The network has affiliates across Missouri, Kansas, Iowa, Nebraska, and Texas, and national reach through desktop and mobile devices. AFC Championship and Super Bowl broadcasts are exclusive to KCSP and WDAF-FM due to NFL rules surrounding the exclusivity of Westwood One's coverage outside of the immediate Kansas City area.

As part of the newest television contracts, non-primetime games are broadcast on CBS or Fox with the biggest markets being the metropolitan areas of Kansas City, Wichita, and Omaha.

The Chiefs' in-house production company is named 65 Toss Power Trap Productions, after a play from the Chiefs Super Bowl IV victory which led to a five-yard touchdown run by Mike Garrett. By 2024, the team established another production company called "Foolish Club Studios", named after the founders of the AFL. That production company helped produce a 2024 Hallmark Channel original Christmas movie, called Holiday Touchdown: A Chiefs Love Story.

== Culture ==
=== Fan base ===
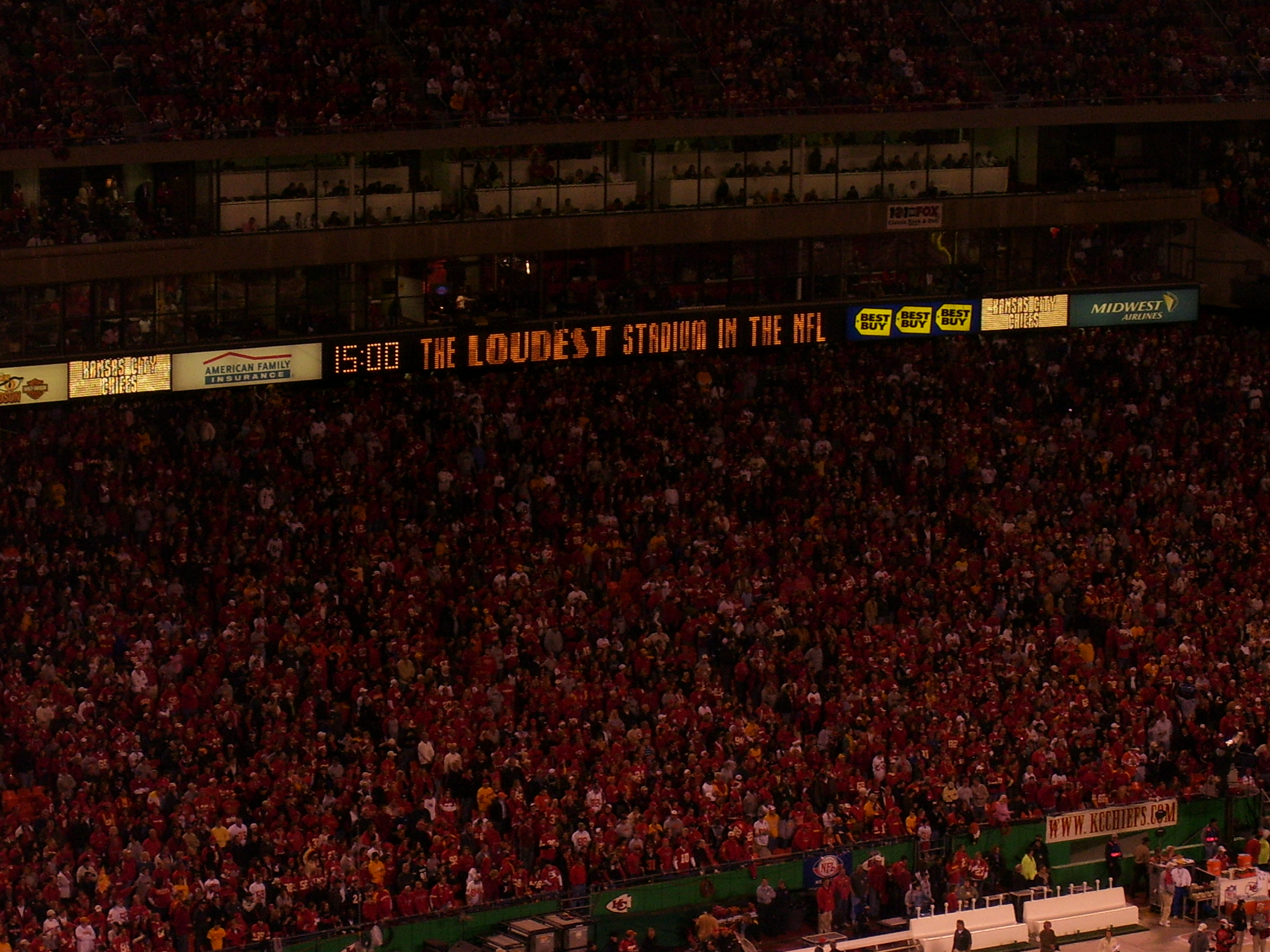
Arrowhead Stadium, during the Broncos–Chiefs game held on Thanksgiving night, 2006

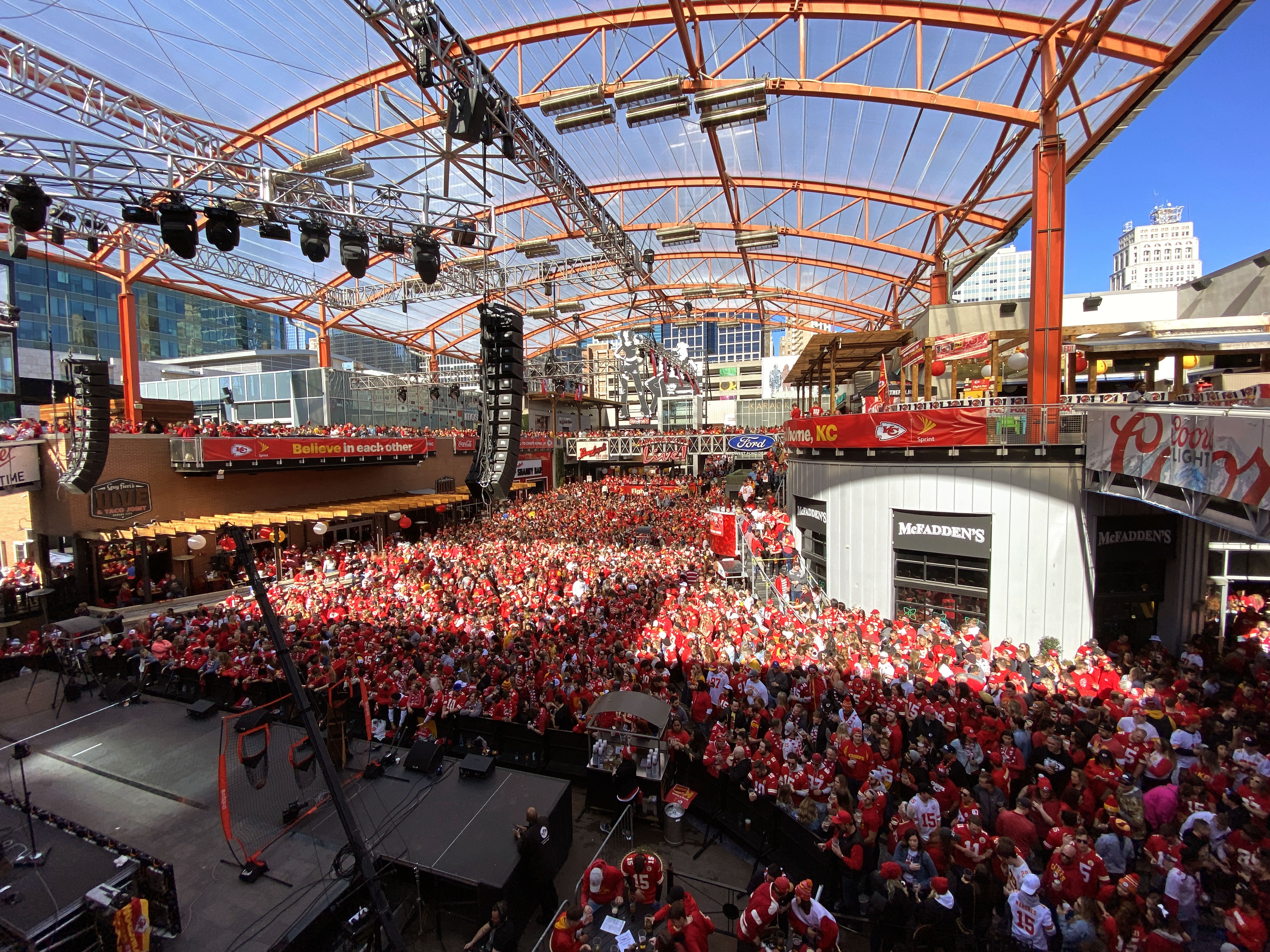
Fans gather at Kansas City Power & Light District for a watch party for Super Bowl LIV

The Chiefs boast one of the most loyal fan bases in the NFL. Kansas City is the sixth-smallest media market with an NFL team, but they have had the second-highest attendance average over the last decade. Studies by Bizjournals in 2006 gave the Chiefs high marks for consistently drawing capacity crowds in both good seasons and bad. The Chiefs averaged 77,300 fans per game from 1996 to 2006, second in the NFL behind the Washington Redskins. The franchise has an official fan club called Chiefs Kingdom which gives members opportunities to ticket priority benefits and VIP treatment.

At the end of "The Star-Spangled Banner" before home games, many Chiefs fans intentionally yell out "CHIEFS!" rather than singing "brave" as the final word. This can also occasionally be heard in road games and even at sporting events for the nearby University of Kansas. In 1996, general manager Carl Peterson said "We all look forward, not only at Arrowhead, but on the road, too, to when we get to that stanza of the National Anthem... Our players love it." After the September 11, 2001 attacks, Chiefs fans refrained from doing so in honor of those who lost their lives in the tragedy and continued to do so for the remainder of the 2001 season. At the Chiefs' September 23, 2001, home game against the New York Giants, fans gave the opposing Giants a standing ovation.

In the past, fans would chant while pointing in the direction of the visiting team, "We're gonna beat the hell outta you...you...you, you, you, you!" over the song "Rock and Roll Part 2". The chant starts after the third "hey!" in the song. The original version of the song by Gary Glitter was previously used until the NFL banned his music from its facilities in 2006 after the British rocker was convicted of sexual abuse charges in Vietnam. A cover version of the song played by Tube Tops 2000 was used from 2006 until the 2015 season. The practice was later completely discontinued before the 2015 season after Glitter was arrested again. The team would eventually adopt Beastie Boys' "(You Gotta) Fight for Your Right (To Party!)" after Travis Kelce shouted the main chorus while celebrating victories in the AFC Championship Game and Super Bowl.

Notable fans include Brad Pitt, Paul Rudd, Jason Sudeikis, Henry Cavill, David Koechner, Rob Riggle, Taylor Swift, Heidi Gardner, John Amos, Melissa Etheridge, and Eric Stonestreet.

Arrowhead Stadium is also recognized by Guinness World Records as having the loudest outdoor stadium in the world. This was achieved on September 29, 2014, in a Monday Night Football game against the New England Patriots when the crowd achieved a roar of 142.2 decibels which is comparable to standing 100 feet (30 m) from a jet engine, which even with short term exposure, can cause permanent damage.

==== International outreach ====
The NFL introduced the league's international home marketing area program in 2021, which sees teams secure international marketing rights in countries beyond the United States. The Chiefs were designated as a home team to Germany alongside the Carolina Panthers, New England Patriots, and Tampa Bay Buccaneers. In 2023 the NFL also granted the Chiefs permission to expand its marketing and fan outreach to Austria and Switzerland.

The Chiefs have played international regular season games against Detroit in 2015 in London, the LA Chargers in 2019 in Mexico City, and Miami in Berlin in 2023. The team participated in preseason exhibition games dubbed the American Bowl in Berlin (1990), Tokyo (1994 and 1998), and Monterrey, Mexico (1996). They were the first NFL team to win games in four different countries.

The Chiefs' fan base has expanded across the world like many other NFL teams. A Twitter account is dedicated to Chiefs fans in the UK and has been recognized by the Kansas City Chiefs and is their official UK fan page. They have many dedicated fans writing articles and interviewing players of the team such as Tamba Hali.

=== Tony DiPardo ===
From various periods between 1963 and the 2008 season, trumpeter Tony DiPardo and The T.D. Pack Band played live music at every Chiefs home game. The band was known as The Zing Band when the team was located at Municipal Stadium. DiPardo was honored by head coach Hank Stram in 1969 with a Super Bowl ring for the team's victory in Super Bowl IV. When his health was declining, DiPardo took a leave of absence from the band from 1983 to 1988. DiPardo's daughter took over as bandleader in 1989, by which time DiPardo returned to the band by popular demand. For the 2009 season, due to renovations at Arrowhead Stadium, the band did not return to perform at the stadium.

DiPardo died on January 27, 2011, at age 98. He had been hospitalized since December 2010 after suffering a brain aneurysm.

== Name controversy ==
The Kansas City Chiefs' Tomahawk chop, which has been described by the Kansas City Indian Center as synchronized racism

For various reasons, the team has faced charges of racism and anti-Indigenous cultural appropriation and misuse of names, symbols, and practices. The name comes from the nickname of former Kansas City mayor Harold Roe Bartle, who nicknamed himself "Chief" as part of creating the Tribe of Mic-O-Say, a group affiliated with Scouting America. Over the years, these have also been displayed: an arrowhead logo, fans' "tomahawk chop" gestures during games, a horse named Warpaint, the use of a large drum, and the wearing of face paint, headdresses, and other faux-Native American symbols.

Chiefs fans also carry on a tradition that began at Florida State University in the mid-1980s by using the Seminole WarChant as a rallying cry during key moments in their football games. Before each home game, a former Chiefs player or a famous Chiefs fan (such as NASCAR driver Clint Bowyer or rapper Tech N9ne), called the honorary drum leader, bangs on a drum with a large drum stick to start the Tomahawk chop.

The Chiefs' and their fans' use of Native American imagery and stereotypes has been criticized for its use of symbols like the "war drum", songs and spectacles like the "Tomahawk chop", and stereotypical dress of fans in faux war paint and headdresses. In 2016, Native American groups asked the Kansas City Chiefs to stop doing the chop. In the same year a similar request was made of Exeter Chiefs. The editorial board of the Kansas City Star newspaper called for the cessation of "the chop" in late 2019, noting opposition from Native Americans and Tribes, and stating that the practice stereotypes and dehumanizes Native Americans. The National Congress of American Indians and the Kansas City Indian Center have called for the mascot to be retired. Secretary Deb Haaland (Laguna Pueblo), the first Indigenous US Secretary of the Interior has called for teams with Native-themed mascots to change mascots, including the Chiefs. Lily Gladstone (Siksikaitsitapii, Nimíipuu), the first Indigenous person nominated for an Academy Award, has also called on the Chiefs to change the name and stop the chop.

The Chiefs have escaped the more intense criticism of other teams, such as the Washington Redskins and Cleveland Indians who changed their names beginning with their 2022 seasons, for using Native American names and logos. Attention increased in 2020 in advance of their appearance in Super Bowl LIV. While there have been efforts to address other issues, such as fans wearing warpaint and headdresses, the tomahawk chop and the accompanying chant is defended, including by some local Native Americans. In a national survey, half of Native Americans said the "tomahawk chop" bothered or offended them, rising to 65% among those more engaged in American Indian traditions.

== See also ==
- Sports in the Kansas City metropolitan area

Preceded by Houston Oilers	AFL champions Dallas Texans; 1962	Succeeded by San Diego Chargers
Preceded by Buffalo Bills	AFL champions 1966	Succeeded by Oakland Raiders
Preceded by New York Jets	AFL champions 1969	Succeeded by None (league merged with the NFL)
Preceded by New York Jets	Super Bowl champions 1969 (IV)	Succeeded by Baltimore Colts
Preceded by New England Patriots	Super Bowl champions 2019 (LIV)	Succeeded by Tampa Bay Buccaneers
Preceded by Los Angeles Rams	Super Bowl champions 2022 (LVII), 2023 (LVIII)	Succeeded by Philadelphia Eagles
