= 1983 Kansas City Chiefs season =

NFL team season

- Owner: Lamar Hunt
- General manager: Jim Schaaf
- Head coach: John Mackovic
- Home stadium: Arrowhead Stadium

Results
- Record: 6–10
- Division place: 5th AFC West
- Playoffs: Did not qualify
- All-Pros: 1: S Deron Cherry (2nd team)
- Pro Bowlers: 4: QB Bill Kenney; WR Carlos Carson; CB Gary Green; S Deron Cherry

The 1983 Kansas City Chiefs season was the franchise's 14th season in the National Football League and the 24th overall. They matched on their 6–10 record and last place finish in the AFC West.

After the conclusion of the 1982 season on January 4, the Chiefs fired head coach Marv Levy. Levy had compiled a 31–42 record in Kansas City. Dallas Cowboys quarterbacks coach John Mackovic was named the fifth head coach in team history on February 2. The 39-year-old Mackovic became the youngest individual ever to hold that post for the club. The Chiefs held the seventh overall pick in the 1983 NFL draft and selected quarterback Todd Blackledge, bypassing future Hall of Fame inductees Jim Kelly and Dan Marino. The Chiefs would not draft another quarterback in the first round until the 2017 NFL draft when they drafted Patrick Mahomes.

Tragedy struck the Chiefs on June 29 when Joe Delaney drowned while attempting to save the lives of three children in Monroe, Louisiana. Delaney was posthumously awarded the Presidential Citizen's Medal by Ronald Reagan on July 13. Linebacker Bobby Bell became the first Chiefs player to be inducted into the Pro Football Hall of Fame on July 30, providing some solace for the mourning Chiefs fan base following Delaney's death.

With Bill Kenney and Todd Blackledge both on the roster, starting quarterback Steve Fuller was traded to the Los Angeles Rams on August 19. Kenney earned a Pro Bowl berth after racking up a franchise-record 4,348 passing yards, while wide receiver Carlos Carson hauled in 80 passes for 1,351 yards. Despite the team's high-flying passing game, Mackovic had trouble finding a suitable replacement for Joe Delaney and the running back position. The highest scoring contest in franchise history took place as the Chiefs and Seattle Seahawks combined for 99 points in a wild, 51–48 overtime loss at the Kingdome. A meager crowd of 11,377 braved near-zero degree temperatures (the franchise's coldest home game until January 2024) to attend the club's season-ending 48–17 win against Denver on December 18, the smallest attendance figure ever for a Chiefs game at Arrowhead as the club finished the year at 6–10. The win did ensure Denver would not host the Wild Card Game the following week, as the Seahawks would take advantage of the Kingdome in a blowout win.

== NFL draft ==
1983 Kansas City Chiefs draft
| Round | Selection | Player | Position | College |
|---|---|---|---|---|
| 1 | 7 | Todd Blackledge | Quarterback | Penn State |
| 2 | 34 | Dave Lutz | Guard | Georgia Tech |
| 3 | 61 | Albert Lewis | Cornerback | Grambling State |
| 4 | 92 | Ron Wetzel | Tight end | Arizona State |
| 5 | 119 | Jim Arnold | Punter | Vanderbilt |
| 6 | 146 | Ellis Gardner | Tackle | Georgia Tech |
| 7 | 173 | Ken Thomas | Running back | San Jose State |
| 7 | 179 | Daryl Posey | Running back | Mississippi College |
| 8 | 204 | Irv Eatman | Tackle | UCLA |
| 9 | 231 | Adam Lingner | Center | Illinois |
| 10 | 257 | Mark Shumate | Defensive tackle | Wisconsin |
| 11 | 284 | Dwayne Jackson | Defensive end | South Carolina State |
| 12 | 315 | Ken Jones | Tackle | Tennessee |

== Personnel ==
=== Staff ===
1983 Kansas City Chiefs staff
| Front office: Founder – Lamar Hunt; President – Jack Steadman; Vice-president and general manager – Jim Schaaf; Director of player personnel – Les Miller; Head coaches: Head coach – John Mackovic; Offensive coaches: Quarterbacks – Pete McCulley; Offensive backs – Willie Peete; Receivers – Richard Williamson; Offensive line/running game – Rod Humenuik; Offensive assistant/quality control – J. D. Helm | Defensive coaches: Defensive coordinator/defensive backs – Bud Carson; Defensive line – Walt Corey; Inside linebackers – Dan Daniel; Outside linebackers – Jim Vechiarella; Defensive backs/defensive quality control – Doug Graber; Special teams coaches: Special teams – Jim Vechiarella; Strength and conditioning: Strength and conditioning – C. T. Hewgley |

=== Roster ===
1983 Kansas City Chiefs roster
| Quarterbacks (QB): 14 Todd Blackledge; 11 Bob Gagliano; 9 Bill Kenney; Running backs (RB): 27 Theotis Brown; 43 Billy Jackson; 42 Lawrence Ricks; 31 Jewerl Thomas; Wide receivers (WR): 88 Carlos Carson; 82 Anthony Hancock; 83 Stephone Paige; 86 J. T. Smith; Tight ends (TE): 85 Ed Beckman; 81 Willie Scott; 87 Ron Wetzel | Offensive linemen (OL): 77 Rich Baldinger T; 65 Tom Condon G; 75 Ellis Gardner G/T; 60 Matt Herkenhoff T; 64 Mark Kirchner G; 62 Adam Lingner C; 72 Dave Lutz T; 70 Jim Rourke T/G; 53 Bob Rush C; 73 Bob Simmons G; Defensive linemen (DL): 99 Mike Bell DE; 91 Ken Kremer NT; 71 Dave Lindstrom DE; 74 Dino Mangiero NT; 79 Dean Prater DE; 67 Art Still DE; 92 Ray Yakavonis NT | Linebackers (LB): 57 Jerry Blanton ILB; 50 Calvin Daniels OLB; 52 Thomas Howard OLB; 51 Charles Jackson OLB; 58 Steve Potter ILB; 59 Gary Spani ILB; 91 John Zamberlin ILB; Defensive backs (DB): 25 Isaac Metcalf CB/S; 45 Trent Bryant CB; 34 Lloyd Burruss SS; 20 Deron Cherry FS; 24 Gary Green CB; 22 Van Jakes CB/S; 38 Durwood Roquemore SS; 23 Lucious Smith CB; 29 Albert Lewis CB; Special teams (ST): 6 Jim Arnold P; 8 Nick Lowery K | Reserve: 66 Brad Budde G (IR); 56 Louis Haynes LB (IR); 55 Dave Klug LB (IR); 89 Henry Marshall WR (IR); -- Dave Paffenroth LB (IR); -- Daryl Posey RB (IR); 35 Ken Thomas RB (IR); 39 Del Thompson RB (IR); 54 James Walker LB (IR); Rookies in italics |

== Preseason ==
| Week | Date | Opponent | Result | Record | Venue | Attendance | Recap |
|---|---|---|---|---|---|---|---|
| 1 | August 6 | at Cincinnati Bengals | W 24–7 | 1–0 | Riverfront Stadium | 42,662 | Recap |
| 2 | August 13 | Detroit Lions | L 13–17 | 1–1 | Arrowhead Stadium | 32,885 | Recap |
| 3 | August 20 | St. Louis Cardinals | W 17–16 | 2–1 | Arrowhead Stadium | 34,070 | Recap |
| 4 | August 27 | at Chicago Bears | L 17–20 (OT) | 2–2 | Soldier Field | 56,311 | Recap |

== Regular season ==
=== Schedule ===
| Week | Date | Opponent | Result | Record | Venue | Attendance | Recap |
|---|---|---|---|---|---|---|---|
| 1 | September 4 | **Seattle Seahawks** | **W** 17–13 | 1–0 | Arrowhead Stadium | 42,531 | Recap |
| 2 | September 12 | **San Diego Chargers** | **L** 14–17 | 1–1 | Arrowhead Stadium | 62,150 | Recap |
| 3 | September 18 | at Washington Redskins | **L** 12–27 | 1–2 | RFK Stadium | 52,610 | Recap |
| 4 | September 25 | at Miami Dolphins | **L** 6–14 | 1–3 | Miami Orange Bowl | 50,785 | Recap |
| 5 | October 2 | St. Louis Cardinals | **W** 38–14 | 2–3 | Arrowhead Stadium | 58,975 | Recap |
| 6 | October 9 | at **Los Angeles Raiders** | **L** 20–21 | 2–4 | Los Angeles Memorial Coliseum | 40,492 | Recap |
| 7 | October 16 | New York Giants | **W** 38–17 | 3–4 | Arrowhead Stadium | 55,449 | Recap |
| 8 | October 23 | at Houston Oilers | **W** 13–10 (OT) | 4–4 | Houston Astrodome | 39,462 | Recap |
| 9 | October 30 | at **Denver Broncos** | **L** 24–27 | 4–5 | Mile High Stadium | 74,640 | Recap |
| 10 | November 6 | **Los Angeles Raiders** | **L** 20–28 | 4–6 | Arrowhead Stadium | 75,497 | Recap |
| 11 | November 13 | Cincinnati Bengals | **W** 20–15 | 5–6 | Arrowhead Stadium | 44,711 | Recap |
| 12 | November 20 | at Dallas Cowboys | **L** 21–41 | 5–7 | Texas Stadium | 64,103 | Recap |
| 13 | November 27 | at **Seattle Seahawks** | **L** 48–51 (OT) | 5–8 | Kingdome | 56,793 | Recap |
| 14 | December 4 | Buffalo Bills | **L** 9–14 | 5–9 | Arrowhead Stadium | 27,104 | Recap |
| 15 | December 11 | at **San Diego Chargers** | **L** 38–41 | 5–10 | Jack Murphy Stadium | 35,510 | Recap |
| 16 | December 18 | **Denver Broncos** | **W** 48–17 | 6–10 | Arrowhead Stadium | 11,377 | Recap |
Note: Intra-division opponents are in **bold** text.

=== Game summaries ===
==== Week 1: vs. Seattle Seahawks ====
Week 1: Seattle Seahawks at Kansas City Chiefs – Game summary

| Quarter | 1 | 2 | 3 | 4 | Total |
|---|---|---|---|---|---|
| Seahawks | 3 | 0 | 3 | 7 | **13** |
| **Chiefs** | 7 | 0 | 7 | 3 | **17** |

at Arrowhead Stadium, Kansas City, Missouri

- Date: September 4
- Game time: 3:00 p.m. CDT
- Game weather: Sunny, 94 °F (34 °C)
- Game attendance: 42,531
- Referee: Fred Silva
- TV announcers (NBC): Jay Randolph and Gene Washington
- Recap, Game Book

Game information

**First quarter**

- SEA – Norm Johnson 34-yard field goal, 12:14. Seahawks 3–0. **Drive: 8 plays, 63 yards, 2:46.**
- KC – Henry Marshall 12-yard pass from Bill Kenney (Nick Lowery kick), 7:33. Chiefs 7–3. **Drive: 9 plays, 80 yards, 4:42.**

**Second quarter**

- No scoring plays.

**Third quarter**

- SEA – Norm Johnson 48-yard field goal, 5:03. Chiefs 7–6. **Drive: 5 plays, 29 yards, 2:11.**
- KC – Carlos Carson 18-yard pass from Jewerl Thomas (Nick Lowery kick), 0:49. Chiefs 14–6. **Drive: 8 plays, 67 yards, 4:04.**

**Fourth quarter**

- KC – Nick Lowery 19-yard field goal, 6:18. Chiefs 17–6. **Drive: 9 plays, 79 yards, 3:30.**
- SEA – Curt Warner 18-yard pass from Jim Zorn (Norm Johnson kick), 3:16. Chiefs 17–13. **Drive: 6 plays, 37 yards, 1:03.**

**Top passers**

- SEA – Jim Zorn – 19/43, 206 yards, TD, 2 INT
- KC – Bill Kenney – 19/32, 247 yards, TD

**Top rushers**

- SEA – Curt Warner – 12 rushes, 93 yards
- KC – Billy Jackson – 19 rushes, 77 yards

**Top receivers**

- SEA – Curt Warner – 6 receptions, 72 yards, TD
- KC – Carlos Carson – 7 receptions, 104 yards, TD

==== Week 2: vs. San Diego Chargers ====
Week 2: San Diego Chargers at Kansas City Chiefs – Game summary

| Quarter | 1 | 2 | 3 | 4 | Total |
|---|---|---|---|---|---|
| **Chargers** | 3 | 0 | 7 | 7 | **17** |
| Chiefs | 0 | 7 | 0 | 7 | **14** |

at Arrowhead Stadium, Kansas City, Missouri

- Date: September 12
- Game time: 8:00 p.m. CDT
- Game weather: Clear, 75 °F (24 °C)
- Game attendance: 62,150
- Referee: Jerry Seeman
- TV announcers (ABC): Frank Gifford, Don Meredith and Howard Cosell
- Recap, Game Book

Game information

**First quarter**

- SD – Rolf Benirschke 51-yard field goal, 8:19. Chargers 3–0. **Drive: 4 plays, 2 yards, 1:37.**

**Second quarter**

- KC – Anthony Hancock 45-yard pass from Bill Kenney (Nick Lowery kick), 3:00. Chiefs 7–3. **Drive: 7 plays, 97 yards, 2:46.**

**Third quarter**

- SD – Chuck Muncie 10-yard run (Rolf Benirschke kick), 6:34. Chargers 10–7. **Drive: 15 plays, 96 yards, 8:26.**

**Fourth quarter**

- KC – Carlos Carson 48-yard pass from Henry Marshall (Nick Lowery kick), 3:07. Chiefs 14–10. **Drive: 9 plays, 80 yards, 5:31.**
- SD – Wes Chandler 12-yard pass from Dan Fouts (Rolf Benirschke kick), 1:45. Chargers 17–14. **Drive: 5 plays, 80 yards, 1:16.**

**Top passers**

- SD – Dan Fouts – 17/25, 259 yards, TD, INT
- KC – Bill Kenney – 23/30, 188 yards, TD, INT

**Top rushers**

- SD – Chuck Muncie – 27 rushes, 110 yards, TD
- KC – Billy Jackson – 10 rushes, 20 yards

**Top receivers**

- SD – Wes Chandler – 5 receptions, 77 yards, TD
- KC – Anthony Hancock – 6 receptions, 73 yards, TD

==== Week 3: at Washington Redskins ====
Week 3: Kansas City Chiefs at Washington Redskins – Game summary

| Quarter | 1 | 2 | 3 | 4 | Total |
|---|---|---|---|---|---|
| Chiefs | 3 | 9 | 0 | 0 | **12** |
| **Redskins** | 0 | 0 | 17 | 10 | **27** |

at RFK Stadium, Washington, D.C.

- Date: September 18
- Game time: 1:00 p.m. EDT
- Game weather: Sunny, 78 °F (26 °C)
- Game attendance: 52,610
- Referee: Bob Frederic
- TV announcers (NBC): Charlie Jones and Bob Griese
- Recap, Game Book

Game information

**First quarter**

- KC – Nick Lowery 58-yard field goal, 9:16. Chiefs 3–0. **Drive: 7 plays, 39 yards, 2:37.**

**Second quarter**

- KC – Nick Lowery 21-yard field goal, 11:10. Chiefs 6–0. **Drive: 8 plays, 81 yards, 3:50.**
- KC – Nick Lowery 32-yard field goal, 1:44. Chiefs 9–0. **Drive: 12 plays, 52 yards, 4:29.**
- KC – Nick Lowery 22-yard field goal, 0:37. Chiefs 12–0. **Drive: 5 plays, 34 yards, 0:24.**

**Third quarter**

- WAS – Mark Moseley 35-yard field goal, 8:42. Chiefs 12–3. **Drive: 4 plays, 4 yards, 1:59.**
- WAS – John Riggins 2-yard run (Mark Moseley kick), 5:27. Chiefs 12–10. **Drive: 8 plays, 28 yards, 2:56.**
- WAS – Don Warren 12-yard pass from Joe Theismann (Mark Moseley kick), 1:06. Redskins 17–12. **Drive: 5 plays, 52 yards, 3:10.**

**Fourth quarter**

- WAS – Clint Didier 39-yard pass from Joe Theismann (Mark Moseley kick), 9:10. Redskins 24–12. **Drive: 7 plays, 82 yards, 4:29.**
- WAS – Mark Moseley 34-yard field goal, 4:10. Redskins 27–12. **Drive: 6 plays, 14 yards, 3:09.**

**Top passers**

- KC – Bill Kenney – 20/46, 330 yards, 2 INT
- WAS – Joe Theismann – 12/27, 153 yards, 2 TD, 2 INT

**Top rushers**

- KC – Jewerl Thomas – 7 rushes, 20 yards
- WAS – John Riggins – 21 rushes, 84 yards, TD

**Top receivers**

- KC – Carlos Carson – 6 receptions, 109 yards
- WAS – Clint Didier – 1 reception, 39 yards, TD

==== Week 4: at Miami Dolphins ====
Week 4: Kansas City Chiefs at Miami Dolphins – Game summary

| Quarter | 1 | 2 | 3 | 4 | Total |
|---|---|---|---|---|---|
| Chiefs | 3 | 3 | 0 | 0 | **6** |
| **Dolphins** | 0 | 7 | 7 | 0 | **14** |

at Miami Orange Bowl, Miami, Florida

- Date: September 25
- Game time: 1:00 p.m. EDT
- Game weather: Sunny, 81 °F (27 °C)
- Game attendance: 50,785
- Referee: Gene Barth
- TV announcers (NBC): Don Criqui and Jim Turner
- Recap, Game Book

Game information

**First quarter**

- KC – Nick Lowery 45-yard field goal, 8:49. Chiefs 3–0. **Drive: 4 plays, 2 yards, 1:00.**

**Second quarter**

- KC – Nick Lowery 46-yard field goal, 14:48. Chiefs 6–0. **Drive: 12 plays, 56 yards, 6:53.**
- MIA – Andra Franklin 1-yard run (Uwe von Schamann kick), 1:00. Dolphins 7–6. **Drive: 5 plays, 42 yards, 1:41.**

**Third quarter**

- MIA – Dan Johnson 1-yard pass from David Woodley (Uwe von Schamann kick), 1:56. Dolphins 14–6. **Drive: 14 plays, 85 yards, 9:17.**

**Fourth quarter**

- No scoring plays.

**Top passers**

- KC – Bill Kenney – 10/22, 105 yards, 4 INT
- MIA – David Woodley – 10/17, 92 yards, TD, 2 INT

**Top rushers**

- KC – Jewerl Thomas – 14 rushes, 46 yards
- MIA – Tony Nathan – 16 rushes, 63 yards

**Top receivers**

- KC – Anthony Hancock – 2 receptions, 38 yards
- MIA – Tony Nathan – 4 receptions, 44 yards

==== Week 5: vs. St. Louis Cardinals ====
Week 5: St. Louis Cardinals at Kansas City Chiefs – Game summary

| Quarter | 1 | 2 | 3 | 4 | Total |
|---|---|---|---|---|---|
| Cardinals | 7 | 0 | 0 | 7 | **14** |
| **Chiefs** | 14 | 0 | 3 | 21 | **38** |

at Arrowhead Stadium, Kansas City, Missouri

- Date: October 2
- Game time: 3:00 p.m. CDT
- Game weather: Clear, 91 °F (33 °C)
- Game attendance: 58,975
- Referee: Jim Tunney
- TV announcers (CBS): Jim Kelly and Jim Hill
- Recap, Game Book

Game information

**First quarter**

- STL – Lee Nelson 36-yard fumble return (Neil O'Donoghue kick), 13:21. Cardinals 7–0.
- KC – Charles Jackson 37-yard fumble return (Nick Lowery kick), 7:56. Tied 7–7.
- KC – Henry Marshall 10-yard pass from Bill Kenney (Nick Lowery kick), 5:21. Chiefs 14–7. **Drive: 3 plays, 15 yards, 0:50.**

**Second quarter**

- No scoring plays.

**Third quarter**

- KC – Nick Lowery 45-yard field goal, 9:00. Chiefs 17–7. **Drive: 11 plays, 48 yards, 4:51.**

**Fourth quarter**

- KC – Billy Jackson 6-yard run (Nick Lowery kick), 14:51. Chiefs 24–7. **Drive: 9 plays, 80 yards, 4:23.**
- KC – Theotis Brown 1-yard run (Nick Lowery kick), 13:43. Chiefs 31–7. **Drive: 3 plays, 9 yards, 0:50.**
- KC – Willie Scott 15-yard pass from Todd Blackledge (Nick Lowery kick), 6:14. Chiefs 38–7. **Drive: 8 plays, 60 yards, 4:52.**
- STL – Ottis Anderson 39-yard run (Neil O'Donoghue kick), 2:44. Chiefs 38–14. **Drive: 7 plays, 78 yards, 3:13.**

**Top passers**

- STL – Jim Hart – 5/13, 33 yards, 3 INT
- KC – Bill Kenney – 17/32, 173 yards, TD, INT

**Top rushers**

- STL – Ottis Anderson – 21 rushes, 106 yards, TD
- KC – Theotis Brown – 11 rushes, 52 yards, TD

**Top receivers**

- STL – Roy Green – 5 receptions, 66 yards
- KC – Carlos Carson – 4 receptions, 81 yards

==== Week 6: at Los Angeles Raiders ====
Week 6: Kansas City Chiefs at Los Angeles Raiders – Game summary

| Quarter | 1 | 2 | 3 | 4 | Total |
|---|---|---|---|---|---|
| Chiefs | 14 | 3 | 0 | 3 | **20** |
| **Raiders** | 0 | 7 | 7 | 7 | **21** |

at Los Angeles Memorial Coliseum, Los Angeles, California

- Date: October 9
- Game time: 1:00 p.m. PDT
- Game weather: Warm and Overcast, 79 °F (26 °C)
- Game attendance: 40,492
- Referee: Jerry Markbreit
- TV announcers (KCTV): Don Fortune and Len Dawson
- Recap, Game Book

Game information

**First quarter**

- KC – Stephone Paige 36-yard pass from Bill Kenney (Nick Lowery kick), 4:00. Chiefs 7–0. **Drive: 6 plays, 56 yards, 1:08.**
- KC – Theotis Brown 1-yard run (Nick Lowery kick), 3:20. Chiefs 14–0. **Drive: 2 plays, 37 yards, 0:20.**

**Second quarter**

- RAI – Todd Christensen 3-yard pass from Jim Plunkett (Chris Bahr kick), 14:05. Chiefs 14–7. **Drive: 6 plays, 46 yards, 1:42.**
- KC – Nick Lowey 32-yard field goal, 2:45. Chiefs 17–7. **Drive: 9 plays, 66 yards, 5:01.**

**Third quarter**

- RAI – Dokie Williams 21-yard pass from Marcus Allen (Chris Bahr kick), 11:15. Chiefs 17–14. **Drive: 6 plays, 75 yards, 3:45.**

**Fourth quarter**

- KC – Nick Lowery 39-yard field goal, 14:43. Chiefs 20–14. **Drive: 12 plays, 57 yards, 3:20.**
- RAI – Marcus Allen fumble recovery in end zone (Chris Bahr kick), 8:29. Raiders 31–20. **Drive: 6 plays, 46 yards, 2:52.**

**Top passers**

- KC – Bill Kenney – 25/45, 272 yards, TD, INT
- RAI – Jim Plunkett – 15/28, 123 yards, TD, 2 INT

**Top rushers**

- KC – Billy Jackson – 12 rushes, 33 yards
- RAI – Marcus Allen – 21 rushes, 53 yards

**Top receivers**

- KC – Theotis Brown – 6 receptions, 72 yards
- RAI – Marcus Allen – 6 receptions, 58 yards

==== Week 7: vs. New York Giants ====
Week 7: New York Giants at Kansas City Chiefs – Game summary

| Quarter | 1 | 2 | 3 | 4 | Total |
|---|---|---|---|---|---|
| Giants | 0 | 14 | 3 | 0 | **17** |
| **Chiefs** | 0 | 10 | 14 | 14 | **38** |

at Arrowhead Stadium, Kansas City, Missouri

- Date: October 16
- Game time: 3:00 p.m. CDT
- Game weather: Overcast, 66 °F (19 °C)
- Game attendance: 55,449
- Referee: Tom Dooley
- TV announcers (CBS): Frank Glieber and Dick Vermeil
- Recap, Game Book

Game information

**First quarter**

- No scoring plays.

**Second quarter**

- KC – Nick Lowery 23-yard field goal, 14:12. Chiefs 3–0. **Drive: 10 plays, 68 yards, 3:21.**
- NYG – Rob Carpenter 15-yard pass from Scott Brunner (Ali Haji-Sheikh kick), 9:46. Giants 7–3. **Drive: 2 plays, 15 yards, 0:38.**
- KC – Willie Scott 4-yard pass from Bill Kenney (Nick Lowery kick), 2:29. Chiefs 10–7. **Drive: 7 plays, 65 yards, 3:21.**
- NYG – Butch Woolfolk 8-yard run (Ali Haji-Sheikh kick), 0:50. Giants 14–10. **Drive: 6 plays, 76 yards, 1:29.**

**Third quarter**

- NYG – Ali Haji-Sheikh 21-yard field goal, 8:28. Giants 17–10. **Drive: 9 plays, 56 yards, 4:02.**
- KC – Henry Marshall 46-yard pass from Bill Kenney (Nick Lowery kick), 3:48. Tied 17–17. **Drive: 10 plays, 88 yards, 4:32.**
- KC – Durwood Roquemore 42-yard interception return (Nick Lowery kick), 2:38. Chiefs 24–17.

**Fourth quarter**

- KC – Henry Marshall 21-yard pass from Bill Kenney (Nick Lowery kick), 11:01. Chiefs 31–17. **Drive: 2 plays, 23 yards, 0:51.**
- KC – Theotis Brown 2-yard pass from Bill Kenney (Nick Lowery kick), 3:48. Chiefs 38–17. **Drive: 11 plays, 86 yards, 5:48.**

**Top passers**

- NYG – Scott Brunner – 18/37, 263 yards, TD, 3 INT
- KC – Bill Kenney – 25/36, 342 yards, 4 TD, INT

**Top rushers**

- NYG – Butch Woolfolk – 16 rushes, 61 yards, TD
- KC – Billy Jackson – 12 rushes, 47 yards

**Top receivers**

- NYG – Earnest Gray – 8 receptions, 111 yards
- KC – Henry Marshall – 7 receptions, 131 yards, 2 TD

==== Week 8: at Houston Oilers ====
Week 8: Kansas City Chiefs at Houston Oilers – Game summary

| Quarter | 1 | 2 | 3 | 4 | OT | Total |
|---|---|---|---|---|---|---|
| **Chiefs** | 0 | 10 | 0 | 0 | 3 | **13** |
| Oilers | 7 | 0 | 0 | 3 | 0 | **10** |

at Houston Astrodome, Houston, Texas

- Date: October 23
- Game time: 12:00 p.m. CDT
- Game weather: None (indoor stadium)
- Game attendance: 39,462
- Referee: Pat Haggerty
- TV announcers (NBC): Don Criqui and Gene Washington
- Recap, Game Book

Game information

**First quarter**

- HOU – Stan Edwards 3-yard pass from Gifford Nielsen (Florian Kempf kick), 3:38. Oilers 7–0. **Drive: 12 plays, 73 yards, 6:32.**

**Second quarter**

- KC – Willie Scott 4-yard pass from Bill Kenney (Nick Lowery kick), 3:15. Tied 7–7. **Drive: 7 plays, 63 yards, 2:45.**
- KC – Nick Lowery 23-yard field goal, 0:06. Chiefs 10–7. **Drive: 5 plays, 31 yards, 0:23.**

**Third quarter**

- No scoring plays.

**Fourth quarter**

- HOU – Florian Kempf 32-yard field goal, 8:25. Tied 10–10. **Drive: 10 plays, 39 yards, 5:08.**

**Overtime**

- KC – Nick Lowery 41-yard field goal, 7:19. Chiefs 13–10. **Drive: 13 plays, 60 yards, 7:41.**

**Top passers**

- KC – Bill Kenney – 25/43, 264 yards, TD
- HOU – Gifford Nielsen – 14/24, 130 yards, TD, INT

**Top rushers**

- KC – Theotis Brown – 10 rushes, 60 yards
- HOU – Earl Campbell – 7 rushes, 54 yards

**Top receivers**

- KC – Carlos Carson – 8 receptions, 88 yards
- HOU – Mike Renfro – 3 receptions, 37 yards

==== Week 9: at Denver Broncos ====
Week 9: Kansas City Chiefs at Denver Broncos – Game summary

| Quarter | 1 | 2 | 3 | 4 | Total |
|---|---|---|---|---|---|
| Chiefs | 7 | 0 | 3 | 14 | **24** |
| **Broncos** | 0 | 17 | 3 | 7 | **27** |

at Mile High Stadium, Denver, Colorado

- Date: October 30
- Game time: 2:00 p.m. MST
- Game weather: Mostly Sunny, 72 °F (22 °C)
- Game attendance: 74,640
- Referee: Chuck Heberling
- TV announcers (NBC): Phil Stone and Bob Chandler
- Recap, Game Book

Game information

**First quarter**

- KC – Theotis Brown 1-yard run (Nick Lowery kick), 5:07. Chiefs 7–0. **Drive: 4 plays, 47 yards, 1:40.**

**Second quarter**

- DEN – Nathan Poole 1-yard run (Rich Karlis kick), 6:11. Tied 7–7. **Drive: 10 plays, 27 yards, 3:57.**
- DEN – Rich Karlis 31-yard field goal, 3:24. Broncos 10–7. **Drive: 5 plays, 30 yards, 2:34.**
- DEN – Steve Watson 46-yard pass from Steve DeBerg (Rich Karlis kick), 1:40. Broncos 17–7. **Drive: 1 play, 46 yards, 0:08.**

**Third quarter**

- KC – Nick Lowery 21-yard field goal, 11:21. Broncos 17–10. **Drive: 6 plays, 32 yards, 1:51.**
- DEN – Rich Karlis 27-yard field goal, 5:51. Broncos 20–10. **Drive: 13 plays, 68 yards, 4:19.**

**Fourth quarter**

- DEN – Nathan Poole 1-yard run (Rich Karlis kick), 8:55. Broncos 27–10. **Drive: 7 plays, 70 yards, 3:18.**
- KC – Billy Jackson 9-yard run (Nick Lowery kick), 6:11. Broncos 27–17. **Drive: 10 plays, 80 yards, 2:38.**
- KC – Carlos Carson 8-yard pass from Bill Kenney (Nick Lowery kick), 1:31. Broncos 27–24. **Drive: 15 plays, 94 yards, 2:51.**

**Top passers**

- KC – Bill Kenney – 27/52, 365 yards, TD, 2 INT
- DEN – Steve DeBerg – 21/41, 350 yards, TD

**Top rushers**

- KC – Billy Jackson – 8 rushes, 17 yards, TD
- DEN – Dave Preston – 14 rushes, 26 yards

**Top receivers**

- KC – Henry Marshall – 6 receptions, 96 yards
- DEN – Rick Upchurch – 6 receptions, 143 yards

==== Week 10: vs. Los Angeles Raiders ====
Week 10: Los Angeles Raiders at Kansas City Chiefs – Game summary

| Quarter | 1 | 2 | 3 | 4 | Total |
|---|---|---|---|---|---|
| **Raiders** | 7 | 0 | 0 | 21 | **28** |
| Chiefs | 0 | 6 | 7 | 7 | **20** |

at Arrowhead Stadium, Kansas City, Missouri

- Date: November 6
- Game time: 12:00 p.m. CST
- Game weather: Cloudy, 60 °F (16 °C)
- Game attendance: 75,497
- Referee: Bob Frederic
- TV announcers (NBC): Charlie Jones and Bob Griese
- Recap, Game Book

Game information

**First quarter**

- RAI – Frank Hawkins 15-yard pass from Marc Wilson (Chris Bahr kick), 7:03. Raiders 7–0. **Drive: 8 plays, 57 yards, 3:06.**

**Second quarter**

- KC – Nick Lowery 54-yard field goal, 0:56. Raiders 7–3. **Drive: 6 plays, 27 yards, 0:53.**
- KC – Nick Lowery 48-yard field goal, 0:06. Raiders 7–6. **Drive: 2 plays, 0 yards, 0:09.**

**Third quarter**

- KC – Theotis Brown 1-yard run (Nick Lowery kick), 2:37. Chiefs 13–7. **Drive: 3 plays, 8 yards, 1:42.**

**Fourth quarter**

- RAI – Marcus Allen 1-yard run (Chris Bahr kick), 12:18. Raiders 14–13. **Drive: 11 plays, 85 yards, 5:09.**
- KC – Ken Thomas 2-yard pass from Bill Kenney (Nick Lowery kick), 7:16. Chiefs 20–14. **Drive: 14 plays, 74 yards, 4:53.**
- RAI – Dokie Williams 19-yard pass from Jim Plunkett (Chris Bahr kick), 3:49. Raiders 21–20. **Drive: 8 plays, 75 yards, 3:16.**
- RAI – Rod Martin 40-yard interception return (Chris Bahr kick), 0:03. Raiders 28–20.

**Top passers**

- RAI – Marc Wilson – 11/23, 143 yards, TD, INT
- KC – Bill Kenney – 24/45, 292 yards, TD, 2 INT

**Top rushers**

- RAI – Marcus Allen – 21 rushes, 64 yards, TD
- KC – Billy Jackson – 15 rushes, 64 yards

**Top receivers**

- RAI – Calvin Muhammad – 2 receptions, 63 yards
- KC – Carlos Carson – 5 receptions, 103 yards

==== Week 11: vs. Cincinnati Bengals ====
Week 11: Cincinnati Bengals at Kansas City Chiefs – Game summary

| Quarter | 1 | 2 | 3 | 4 | Total |
|---|---|---|---|---|---|
| Bengals | 3 | 3 | 3 | 6 | **15** |
| **Chiefs** | 3 | 10 | 7 | 0 | **20** |

at Arrowhead Stadium, Kansas City, Missouri

- Date: November 13
- Game time: 12:00 p.m. CST
- Game weather: Sunny, 53 °F (12 °C)
- Game attendance: 44,711
- Referee: Fred Wyant
- TV announcers (NBC): Phil Stone and Reggie Rucker
- Recap, Game Book

Game information

**First quarter**

- KC – Nick Lowery 36-yard field goal, 9:04. Chiefs 3–0. **Drive: 7 plays, 36 yards, 3:39.**
- CIN – Jim Breech 23-yard field goal, 0:54. Tied 3–3. **Drive: 13 plays, 69 yards, 8:01.**

**Second quarter**

- KC – Bill Kenney 1-yard run (Nick Lowery kick), 12:16. Chiefs 10–3. **Drive: 5 plays, 77 yards, 3:19.**
- CIN – Jim Breech 31-yard field goal, 5:37. Chiefs 10–6. **Drive: 6 plays, 23 yards, 2:12.**
- KC – Nick Lowery 43-yard field goal, 1:06. Chiefs 13–6. **Drive: 6 plays, 33 yards, 1:54.**

**Third quarter**

- CIN – Jim Breech 23-yard field goal, 10:14. Chiefs 13–9. **Drive: 8 plays, 40 yards, 3:14.**
- KC – Willie Scott 21-yard from Bill Kenney (Nick Lowery kick), 4:49. Chiefs 20–9. **Drive: 13 plays, 80 yards, 5:19.**

**Fourth quarter**

- CIN – Cris Collinsworth 5-yard pass from Ken Anderson (kick blocked), 3:54. Chiefs 20–15. **Drive: 8 plays, 42 yards, 2:02.**

**Top passers**

- CIN – Ken Anderson – 19/32, 219 yards, TD, 2 INT
- KC – Bill Kenney – 23/34, 244 yards, TD

**Top rushers**

- CIN – Pete Johnson – 17 rushes, 53 yards
- KC – Billy Jackson – 12 rushes, 40 yards

**Top receivers**

- CIN – Cris Collinsworth – 7 receptions, 118 yards, TD
- KC – Theotis Brown – 4 receptions, 73 yards

==== Week 12: at Dallas Cowboys ====
Week 12: Kansas City Chiefs at Dallas Cowboys – Game summary

| Quarter | 1 | 2 | 3 | 4 | Total |
|---|---|---|---|---|---|
| Chiefs | 0 | 0 | 14 | 7 | **21** |
| **Cowboys** | 10 | 10 | 7 | 14 | **41** |

at Texas Stadium, Irving, Texas

- Date: November 20
- Game time: 3:00 p.m. CST
- Game weather: Clear, 71 °F (22 °C)
- Game attendance: 64,103
- Referee: Jerry Markbreit
- TV announcers (NBC): Dick Enberg and Merlin Olsen
- Recap, Game Book

Game information

**First quarter**

- DAL – Ron Springs 1-yard run (Rafael Septién kick), 11:58. Cowboys 7–0. **Drive: 5 plays, 73 yards, 2:27.**
- DAL – Rafael Septién 25-yard field goal, 0:10. Cowboys 10–0. **Drive: 11 plays, 58 yards, 4:43.**

**Second quarter**

- DAL – Tony Dorsett 28-yard run (Rafael Septién kick), 7:11. Cowboys 17–0. **Drive: 10 plays, 80 yards, 5:23.**
- DAL – Rafael Septién 40-yard field goal, 0:15. Cowboys 20–0. **Drive: 7 plays, 43 yards, 1:45.**

**Third quarter**

- DAL – Tony Dorsett 32-yard run (Rafael Septién kick), 9:59. Cowboys 27–0. **Drive: 2 plays, 32 yards, 0:12.**
- KC – Carlos Carson 13-yard pass from Bill Kenney (Nick Lowery kick), 6:31. Cowboys 27–7. **Drive: 7 plays, 80 yards, 3:28.**
- KC – Carlos Carson 48-yard pass from Bill Kenney (Nick Lowery kick), 2:03. Cowboys 27–14. **Drive: 7 plays, 71 yards, 2:42.**

**Fourth quarter**

- DAL – Timmy Newsome 7-yard run (Rafael Septién kick), 9:30. Cowboys 34–14. **Drive: 8 plays, 66 yards, 3:16.**
- DAL – Gary Allen 68-yard punt return (Rafael Septién kick), 7:02. Cowboys 41–14.
- KC – Stephone Paige 7-yard pass from Todd Blackledge (Nick Lowery kick), 2:12. Cowboys 41–21. **Drive: 14 plays, 70 yards, 4:50.**

**Top passers**

- KC – Bill Kenney – 23/40, 337 yards, 2 TD, 2 INT
- DAL – Danny White – 18/31, 237 yards, INT

**Top rushers**

- KC – Billy Jackson – 5 rushes, 22 yards
- DAL – Tony Dorsett – 18 rushes, 108 yards, 2 TD

**Top receivers**

- KC – Carlos Carson – 7 receptions, 135 yards, 2 TD
- DAL – Tony Hill – 6 receptions, 92 yards

==== Week 13: at Seattle Seahawks ====
Week 13: Kansas City Chiefs at Seattle Seahawks – Game summary

| Quarter | 1 | 2 | 3 | 4 | OT | Total |
|---|---|---|---|---|---|---|
| Chiefs | 7 | 21 | 7 | 13 | 0 | **48** |
| **Seahawks** | 7 | 7 | 17 | 17 | 3 | **51** |

at Kingdome, Seattle, Washington

- Date: November 27
- Game time: 1:00 p.m. PST
- Game weather: None (indoor stadium)
- Game attendance: 56,793
- Referee: Red Cashion
- TV announcers (NBC): Merle Harmon and Jim Turner
- Recap, Game Book

Game information

**First quarter**

- KC – Henry Marshall 11-yard pass from Bill Kenney (Nick Lowery kick), 10:39. Chiefs 7–0. **Drive: 9 plays, 80 yards, 4:16.**
- SEA – Curt Warner 28-yard run (Norm Johnson kick), 3:23. Tied 7–7. **Drive: 10 plays, 66 yards, 3:39.**

**Second quarter**

- KC – Stephone Paige 17-yard pass from Bill Kenney (Nick Lowery kick), 14:10. Chiefs 14–7. **Drive: 11 plays, 74 yards, 4:04.**
- KC – Bill Kenney 1-yard run (Nick Lowery kick), 5:06. Chiefs 21–7. **Drive: 1 play, 1 yard, 0:01.**
- SEA – Byron Walker 18-yard pass from Dave Krieg (Norm Johnson kick), 3:06. Chiefs 21–14. **Drive: 5 plays, 67 yards, 1:47.**
- KC – Theotis Brown 13-yard run (Nick Lowery kick), 0:45. Chiefs 28–14. **Drive: 2 plays, 13 yards, 0:10.**

**Third quarter**

- SEA – Dan Doornink 27-yard pass from Dave Krieg (Norm Johnson kick), 12:48. Chiefs 28–21. **Drive: 3 plays, 20 yards, 0:17.**
- SEA – Curt Warner 1-yard run (Norm Johnson kick), 10:22. Tied 28–28. **Drive: 4 plays, 18 yards, 2:17.**
- SEA – Norm Johnson 42-yard field goal, 6:55. Seahawks 31–28. **Drive: 5 plays, 29 yards, 2:14.**
- KC – Bill Kenney 1-yard run (Nick Lowery kick), 2:34. Chiefs 35–31. **Drive: 10 plays, 76 yards, 4:10.**

**Fourth quarter**

- KC – Carlos Carson 18-yard pass from Bill Kenney (Nick Lowery kick), 11:04. Chiefs 42–31. **Drive: 3 plays, 55 yards, 0:52.**
- SEA – Curt Warner 1-yard run (Norm Johnson kick), 7:00. Chiefs 42–38. **Drive: 8 plays, 69 yards, 3:34.**
- SEA – Paul Johns 14-yard pass from Dave Krieg (Norm Johnson kick), 2:24. Seahawks 45–42. **Drive: 8 plays, 40 yards, 0:16.**
- KC – Theotis Brown 21-yard pass from Bill Kenney (kick failed, wide left), 1:30. Chiefs 48–45. **Drive: 6 plays, 80 yards, 0:45.**
- SEA – Norm Johnson 42-yard field goal, 0:02. Tied 48–48. **Drive: 9 plays, 58 yards, 1:24.**

**Overtime**

- SEA – Norm Johnson 42-yard field goal, 13:14. Seahawks 51–48. **Drive: 4 plays, 24 yards, 1:34.**

**Top passers**

- KC – Bill Kenney – 21/38, 311 yards, 4 TD
- SEA – Dave Krieg – 16/31, 280 yards, 3 TD, INT

**Top rushers**

- KC – Theotis Brown – 13 rushes, 56 yards, TD
- SEA – Curt Warner – 32 rushes, 207 yards, 3 TD

**Top receivers**

- KC – Carlos Carson – 7 receptions, 149 yards, TD
- SEA – Byron Walker – 4 receptions, 75 yards, TD

==== Week 14: vs. Buffalo Bills ====
Week 14: Buffalo Bills at Kansas City Chiefs – Game summary

| Quarter | 1 | 2 | 3 | 4 | Total |
|---|---|---|---|---|---|
| **Bills** | 0 | 7 | 0 | 7 | **14** |
| Chiefs | 0 | 3 | 3 | 3 | **9** |

at Arrowhead Stadium, Kansas City, Missouri

- Date: December 4
- Game time: 12:00 p.m. CST
- Game weather: Overcast, 34 °F (1 °C)
- Game attendance: 27,104
- Referee: Jerry Seeman
- TV announcers (NBC): Don Criqui and Gene Washington
- Recap, Game Book

Game information

**First quarter**

- No scoring plays.

**Second quarter**

- BUF – Perry Tuttle 17-yard pass from Joe Ferguson (Joe Danelo kick), 11:27. Bills 7–0. **Drive: 8 plays, 76 yards, 5:04.**
- KC – Nick Lowery 48-yard field goal, 8:45. Bills 7–3. **Drive: 8 plays, 49 yards, 2:32.**

**Third quarter**

- KC – Nick Lowery 25-yard field goal, 7:30. Bills 7–6. **Drive: 8 plays, 77 yards, 4:10.**

**Fourth quarter**

- BUF – Mike Kennedy 22-yard interception return (Joe Danelo kick), 13:10. Bills 14–6.
- KC – Nick Lowery 42-yard field goal, 4:47. Bills 14–9. **Drive: 10 plays, 46 yards, 1:57.**

**Top passers**

- BUF – Joe Ferguson – 6/15, 76 yards, TD, INT
- KC – Bill Kenney – 22/43, 306 yards, 2 INT

**Top rushers**

- BUF – Joe Cribbs – 36 rushes, 185 yards
- KC – Theotis Brown – 13 rushes, 39 yards

**Top receivers**

- BUF – Byron Franklin – 2 receptions, 39 yards
- KC – Carlos Carson – 3 receptions, 65 yards

==== Week 15: at San Diego Chargers ====
Week 15: Kansas City Chiefs at San Diego Chargers – Game summary

| Quarter | 1 | 2 | 3 | 4 | Total |
|---|---|---|---|---|---|
| Chiefs | 7 | 7 | 10 | 14 | **38** |
| **Chargers** | 10 | 14 | 14 | 3 | **41** |

at Jack Murphy Stadium, San Diego, California

- Date: December 11
- Game time: 1:00 p.m. PST
- Game weather: Cloudy, 62 °F (17 °C)
- Game attendance: 35,510
- Referee: Ben Dreith
- TV announcers (NBC): Charlie Jones and Bob Griese
- Recap, Game Book

Game information

**First quarter**

- SD – Rolf Benirschke 27-yard field goal, 10:33. Chargers 3–0. **Drive: 7 plays, 21 yards, 2:37.**
- SD – Kellen Winslow 37-yard pass from Dan Fouts (Rolf Benirschke kick), 4:40. Chargers 10–0. **Drive: 5 plays, 43 yards, 2:15.**
- KC – Carlos Carson 50-yard pass from Bill Kenney (Nick Lowery kick), 2:06. Chargers 10–7. **Drive: 5 plays, 80 yards, 2:28.**

**Second quarter**

- SD – Kellen Winslow 18-yard pass from Dan Fouts (Rolf Benirschke kick), 14:06. Chargers 17–7. **Drive: 7 plays, 73 yards, 2:51.**
- KC – Stephone Paige 20-yard pass from Bill Kenney (Nick Lowery kick), 5:29. Chargers 17–14. **Drive: 7 plays, 58 yards, 1:48.**
- SD – Kellen Winslow 5-yard pass from Dan Fouts (Rolf Benirschke kick), 0:53. Chargers 24–14. **Drive: 12 plays, 92 yards, 4:22.**

**Third quarter**

- KC – Theotis Brown 49-yard run (Nick Lowery kick), 13:24. Chargers 24–21. **Drive: 5 plays, 71 yards, 0:56.**
- SD – Dan Fouts 1-yard run (Rolf Benirschke kick), 6:55. Chargers 31–21. **Drive: 12 plays, 70 yards, 6:19.**
- KC – Nick Lowery 49-yard field goal, 4:01. Chargers 31–24. **Drive: 7 plays, 38 yards, 2:45.**
- SD – Wes Chandler 44-yard pass from Ed Luther (Rolf Benirschke kick), 0:02. Chargers 38–24. **Drive: 5 plays, 80 yards, 1:08.**

**Fourth quarter**

- KC – Stephone Paige 16-yard pass from Bill Kenney (Nick Lowery kick), 11:45. Chargers 38–31. **Drive: 6 plays, 73 yards, 3:15.**
- KC – Willie Scott 3-yard pass from Bill Kenney (Nick Lowery kick), 1:34. Tied 38–38. **Drive: 4 plays, 46 yards, 0:54.**
- SD – Rolf Benirschke 28-yard field goal, 0:02. Chargers 41–38. **Drive: 7 plays, 70 yards, 1:30.**

**Top passers**

- KC – Bill Kenney – 31/41, 411 yards, 4 TD, INT
- SD – Dan Fouts – 25/36, 285 yards, 3 TD, INT

**Top rushers**

- KC – Theotis Brown – 8 rushes, 94 yards, TD
- SD – James Brooks – 14 rushes, 81 yards

**Top receivers**

- KC – Carlos Carson – 7 receptions, 165 yards, TD
- SD – Kellen Winslow – 14 receptions, 162 yards, 3 TD

==== Week 16: vs. Denver Broncos ====
Week 16: Denver Broncos at Kansas City Chiefs – Game summary

| Quarter | 1 | 2 | 3 | 4 | Total |
|---|---|---|---|---|---|
| Broncos | 0 | 3 | 0 | 14 | **17** |
| **Chiefs** | 21 | 7 | 10 | 10 | **48** |

at Arrowhead Stadium, Kansas City, Missouri

- Date: December 18
- Game time: 12:00 p.m. CST
- Game weather: Clear, 0 °F (−18 °C)
- Game attendance: 11,377
- Referee: Tom Dooley
- TV announcers (NBC): Phil Stone and Jim Turner
- Recap, Game Book

Game information

**First quarter**

- KC – Lucious Smith 58-yard interception return (Nick Lowery kick), 13:53. Chiefs 7–0.
- KC – Carlos Carson 48-yard pass from Bill Kenney (Nick Lowery kick), 7:47. Chiefs 14–0. **Drive: 3 plays, 52 yards, 1:48.**
- KC – Willie Scott 17-yard pass from Bill Kenney (Nick Lowery kick), 2:06. Chiefs 21–0. **Drive: 5 plays, 28 yards, 1:13.**

**Second quarter**

- DEN – Rich Karlis 24-yard field goal, 12:21. Chiefs 21–3. **Drive: 14 plays, 73 yards, 7:30.**
- KC – Theotis Brown 1-yard run (Nick Lowery kick), 4:27. Chiefs 28–3. **Drive: 9 plays, 31 yards, 5:14.**

**Third quarter**

- KC – Nick Lowery 38-yard field goal, 7:00. Chiefs 31–3. **Drive: 9 plays, 53 yards, 5:14.**
- KC – Theotis Brown 6-yard run (Nick Lowery kick), 2:10. Chiefs 38–3. **Drive: 3 plays, 17 yards, 1:32.**

**Fourth quarter**

- KC – Nick Lowery 43-yard field goal, 11:56. Chiefs 41–3. **Drive: 10 plays, 36 yards, 4:04.**
- DEN – Gerald Willhite 1-yard run (Rich Karlis kick), 8:57. Chiefs 41–10. **Drive: 7 plays, 75 yards, 2:50.**
- DEN – Gerald Willhite 2-yard run (Rich Karlis kick), 8:35. Chiefs 41–17. **Drive: 1 play, 2 yards, 0:04.**
- KC – Stephone Paige 23-yard pass from Todd Blackledge (Nick Lowery kick), 1:53. Chiefs 48–17. **Drive: 4 plays, 45 yards, 2:21.**

**Top passers**

- DEN – John Elway – 13/34, 143 yards, 4 INT
- KC – Bill Kenney – 11/24, 161 yards, 2 TD

**Top rushers**

- DEN – Sammy Winder – 11 rushes, 34 yards
- KC – Theotis Brown – 16 rushes, 51 yards, 2 TD

**Top receivers**

- DEN – Zach Thomas – 1 reception, 44 yards
- KC – Stephone Paige – 3 receptions, 74 yards, TD

=== Standings ===
AFC West
| | W | L | T | PCT | DIV | CONF | PF | PA | STK |
|---|---|---|---|---|---|---|---|---|---|
| ^{(1)} Los Angeles Raiders | 12 | 4 | 0 | .750 | 6–2 | 10–2 | 442 | 338 | W1 |
| ^{(4)} Seattle Seahawks | 9 | 7 | 0 | .563 | 5–3 | 8–4 | 403 | 397 | W2 |
| ^{(5)} Denver Broncos | 9 | 7 | 0 | .563 | 3–5 | 9–5 | 302 | 327 | L1 |
| San Diego Chargers | 6 | 10 | 0 | .375 | 4–4 | 4–8 | 358 | 462 | L1 |
| Kansas City Chiefs | 6 | 10 | 0 | .375 | 2–6 | 4–8 | 386 | 367 | W1 |
