= 1982 Kansas City Chiefs season =

NFL team season

- Owner: Lamar Hunt
- General manager: Jim Schaaf
- Head coach: Marv Levy
- Home stadium: Arrowhead Stadium

Results
- Record: 3–6
- Conference place: 11th AFC
- Playoffs: Did not qualify
- All-Pros: None
- Pro Bowlers: 3: DE Art Still; CB Gary Green; S Gary Barbaro

The 1982 Kansas City Chiefs season was the franchise's strike-shortened 13th season in the National Football League and the 23rd overall.

In May 1982, running back Joe Delaney underwent surgery to repair a detached retina in his eye, a radical procedure at the time. Optimism abounded at Arrowhead Stadium thanks to the club's promising 9–7 record from 1981, but swelling labor unrest from NFL players spelled doom for both the Chiefs and Levy in 1982. The Chiefs split their first two games of the year before a 57-day strike by the NFL Players Association began at midnight on September 20. The strike concluded on November 17 after seven games were canceled and one was rescheduled, but the Chiefs would never recover, losing four straight games after their return to the field.

Center Jack Rudnay, who had been one of the franchise's most durable and decorated offensive performers over the past decade-plus, announced on December 20 that he would retire after the season. Rudnay was the last remaining Chief who played for the team at Municipal Stadium, their home from 1963 to 1971.

The Chiefs finished the strike-shortened season at 3–6. Following the season, head coach Marv Levy was fired after going 31–42 in five seasons with zero playoff appearances.

== Offseason ==
=== NFL draft ===
1982 Kansas City Chiefs draft
Round	Pick	Player	Position	College	Notes
1	11	Anthony Hancock	Wide receiver	Tennessee	
2	46	Calvin Daniels	Linebacker	North Carolina	
4	100	Louis Haynes	Linebacker	North Texas State	
4	104	Stuart Anderson	Linebacker	Virginia	
5	130	Del Thompson	Running back	Texas–El Paso	
6	157	Durwood Roquemore	Defensive back	Texas A&I	
7	184	Greg Smith	Defensive end	Kansas	
8	214	Case deBruijn	Punter	Idaho State	
9	241	Lyndle Byford	Guard	Oklahoma	
10	268	Larry Brodsky	Wide receiver	Miami (FL)	
11	297	Bob Carter	Wide receiver	Arizona	
12	324	Mike Miller	Defensive back	Southwest Texas State	
Made roster

=== Undrafted free agents ===
1982 undrafted free agents of note
Player	Position	College
Glenn Howard	Linebacker	Minnesota

== Personnel ==
=== Staff ===
1982 Kansas City Chiefs staff
Front office: Founder – Lamar Hunt; President – Jack Steadman; Vice-president and General Manager – Jim Schaaf; Director of Player Personnel – Les Miller; Director of Research and Development – Ron Waller; Head coaches: Head coach – Marv Levy; Offensive coaches: Quarterbacks and Receivers – Kay Dalton; Offensive Backs – J. D. Helm; Tight Ends – Frank Gansz; Offensive line – Tom Bresnahan	Defensive coaches: Defensive coordinator – Rod Rust; Defensive line – Don Lawrence; Linebackers – Ted Cottrell; Defensive Backs – Walt Corey; Special teams coaches: Kicking Teams – Frank Gansz; Strength and conditioning: Strength and Conditioning – Rick Abernethy

=== Roster ===
1982 Kansas City Chiefs roster
Quarterbacks (QB): 4 Steve Fuller; 11 Bob Gagliano; 9 Bill Kenney; Running backs (RB): 37 Joe Delaney; 21 Clark Gaines; 48 James Hadnot; 43 Billy Jackson; 39 Del Thompson; Wide receivers (WR): 83 Robert Blakley; 88 Carlos Carson; 82 Anthony Hancock; 89 Henry Marshall; 86 J. T. Smith; Tight ends (TE): 85 Ed Beckman; 84 Al Dixon; 81 Willie Scott	Offensive linemen (OL): 66 Brad Budde G; 77 Charlie Getty T; 60 Matt Herkenhoff T; 63 John Olenchalk C; 70 Jim Rourke T/G; 58 Jack Rudnay C; 73 Bob Simmons G; 69 Al Steinfeld C; 64 Les Studdard C; Defensive linemen (DL): 76 Bill Acker DE; 91 Ken Kremer NT; 71 Dave Lindstrom DE; 74 Dino Mangiero NT; 61 Don Parrish DE; 67 Art Still DE	Linebackers (LB): 57 Jerry Blanton ILB; 50 Calvin Daniels OLB; 56 Louis Haynes OLB; 52 Thomas Howard OLB; 51 Charles Jackson OLB; 55 Dave Klug ILB; 59 Gary Spani ILB; 54 James Walker ILB; Defensive backs (DB): 25 Gary Barbaro FS; 45 Trent Bryant CB; 34 Lloyd Burruss SS; 41 Herb Christopher SS; 24 Gary Green CB; 44 Eric Harris CB; 38 Durwood Roquemore FS; 42 Tim Washington CB; Special teams (ST): 7 Jeff Gossett P; 8 Nick Lowery K	Reserve: 99 Mike Bell DE (IR); 20 Deron Cherry S (IR); 65 Tom Condon G (IR); -- Kyle McNorton LB (IR); 79 Dean Prater DE (NF-Inj.); —- Greg Smith DT (IR); -- Ron Washington WR (IR); Rookies in italics

== Preseason ==
Week	Date	Opponent	Result	Record	Venue	Attendance	Recap
1	August 13	Cincinnati Bengals	W 26–20	1–0	Arrowhead Stadium	31,985	Recap
2	August 21	at New Orleans Saints	L 3–6	1–1	Louisiana Superdome	46,585	Recap
3	August 28	Miami Dolphins	T 17–17 (OT)	1–1–1	Arrowhead Stadium	42,403	Recap
4	September 4	at St. Louis Cardinals	W 10–6	2–1–1	Busch Memorial Stadium	39,926	Recap

== Regular season ==
=== Schedule ===
Week	Date	Opponent	Result	Record	Venue	Attendance	Recap
1	September 12	at Buffalo Bills	**L** 9–14	0–1	Rich Stadium	76,383	Recap
2	September 19	**San Diego Chargers**	**W** 19–12	1–1	Arrowhead Stadium	60,514	Recap
3–10	Players' strike						
11	November 21	at New Orleans Saints	**L** 17–27	1–2	Louisiana Superdome	39,341	Recap
12	November 28	at Los Angeles Rams	**L** 14–20	1–3	Anaheim Stadium	45,793	Recap
13	December 5	at Pittsburgh Steelers	**L** 14–35	1–4	Three Rivers Stadium	52,090	Recap
14	December 12	**Los Angeles Raiders**	**L** 16–21	1–5	Arrowhead Stadium	26,307	Recap
15	December 19	at **Denver Broncos**	**W** 37–16	2–5	Mile High Stadium	74,192	Recap
16	December 26	San Francisco 49ers	**L** 13–26	2–6	Arrowhead Stadium	24,319	Recap
17	January 2	New York Jets	**W** 37–13	3–6	Arrowhead Stadium	11,902	Recap
Note: Intra-division opponents are in **bold** text.

=== Game summaries ===
==== Week 1: at Buffalo Bills ====
Week 1: Kansas City Chiefs at Buffalo Bills – Game summary

Quarter	1	2	3	4	Total
Chiefs	3	3	0	3	**9**
**Bills**	7	7	0	0	**14**

at Rich Stadium, Orchard Park, New York

- Date: September 12
- Game time: 1:00 p.m. EDT
- Game weather: Sunny, 81 °F (27 °C)
- Game attendance: 76,383
- Referee: Jerry Seeman
- TV announcers (NBC): Jay Randolph and Mike Haffner
- Recap, Game Book

Game information

**First quarter**

- KC – Nick Lowery 39-yard field goal, 11:33. Chiefs 3–0. **Drive: 10 plays, 58 yards, 3:27.**
- BUF – Frank Lewis 20-yard pass from Joe Ferguson (Nick Mike-Mayer kick), 3:37. Bills 7–3. **Drive: 14 plays, 61 yards, 7:56.**

**Second quarter**

- KC – Nick Lowery 47-yard field goal, 11:55. Bills 7–6. **Drive: 14 plays, 54 yards, 6:42.**
- BUF – Jerry Butler 6-yard pass from Joe Ferguson (Nick Mike-Mayer kick), 0:37. Bills 14–6. **Drive: 7 plays, 62 yards, 1:16.**

**Third quarter**

- No scoring plays.

**Fourth quarter**

- KC – Nick Lowery 42-yard field goal, 11:48. Bills 14–9. **Drive: 5 plays, 28 yards, 0:46.**

**Top passers**

- KC – Bill Kenney – 14/30, 149 yards, INT
- BUF – Joe Ferguson – 18/31, 266 yards, 2 TD

**Top rushers**

- KC – Billy Jackson – 12 rushes, 53 yards
- BUF – Curtis Brown – 13 rushes, 50 yards

**Top receivers**

- KC – Henry Marshall – 5 receptions, 69 yards
- BUF – Jerry Butler – 6 receptions, 51 yards, TD

==== Week 2: vs. San Diego Chargers ====
Week 2: San Diego Chargers at Kansas City Chiefs – Game summary

Quarter	1	2	3	4	Total
Chargers	0	0	9	3	**12**
**Chiefs**	7	9	3	0	**19**

at Arrowhead Stadium, Kansas City, Missouri

- Date: September 19
- Game time: 12:00 p.m. CDT
- Game weather: Clear, 70 °F (21 °C)
- Game attendance: 60,514
- Referee: Ben Dreith
- TV announcers (NBC): Marv Albert and Bob Griese
- Recap, Game Book

Game information

**First quarter**

- KC – Dave Klug blocked punt recovery in endzone (Nick Lowery kick), 13:09. Chiefs 7–0.

**Second quarter**

- KC – Nick Lowery 19-yard field goal, 11:50. Chiefs 10–0. **Drive: 15 plays, 67 yards, 9:16.**
- KC – Nick Lowery 27-yard field goal, 2:36. Chiefs 13–0. **Drive: 5 plays, 48 yards, 2:27.**
- KC – Nick Lowery 41-yard field goal, 0:00. Chiefs 16–0. **Drive: 6 plays, 18 yards, 1:06.**

**Third quarter**

- SD – Wes Chandler 17-yard pass from Chuck Muncie (Rolf Benirschke kick), 8:02. Chiefs 16–7. **Drive: 8 plays, 77 yards, 3:40.**
- SD – Penalty on Matt Herkenhoff enforced in end zone for a Safety, 6:20. Chiefs 16–9.
- KC – Nick Lowery 34-yard field goal, 2:23. Chiefs 19–9. **Drive: 7 plays, 31 yards, 2:47.**

**Fourth quarter**

- SD – Rolf Benirschke 49-yard field goal, 14:21. Chiefs 19–12. **Drive: 7 plays, 18 yards, 2:50.**

**Top passers**

- SD – Dan Fouts – 21/36, 204 yards, INT
- KC – Bill Kenney – 22/30, 203 yards, INT

**Top rushers**

- SD – Chuck Muncie – 12 rushes, 52 yards
- KC – Joe Delaney – 10 rushes, 51 yards

**Top receivers**

- SD – Wes Chandler – 6 receptions, 69 yards, TD
- KC – Henry Marshall – 4 receptions, 63 yards

==== Week 11: at New Orleans Saints ====
Week 11: Kansas City Chiefs at New Orleans Saints – Game summary

Quarter	1	2	3	4	Total
Chiefs	0	7	0	10	**17**
**Saints**	10	0	7	10	**27**

at Louisiana Superdome, New Orleans, Louisiana

- Date: November 21
- Game time: 12:00 p.m. CST
- Game weather: None (indoor stadium)
- Game attendance: 39,741
- Referee: Bob Frederic
- TV announcers (NBC): Phil Stone and Gene Washington
- Recap, Game Book

Game information

**First quarter**

- NO – Toni Fritsch 19-yard field goal, 7:15. Saints 3–0. **Drive: 11 plays, 46 yards, 5:51.**
- NO – Wayne Wilson 15-yard pass from Guido Merkens (Toni Fritsch kick), 0:47. Saints 10–0. **Drive: 6 plays, 31 yards, 2:55.**

**Second quarter**

- KC – Henry Marshall 44-yard pass from Bill Kenney (Nick Lowery kick), 11:33. Saints 10–7. **Drive: 7 plays, 79 yards, 4:14.**

**Third quarter**

- NO – George Rogers 1-yard run (Toni Fritsch kick), 8:26. Saints 17–7. **Drive: 10 plays, 88 yards, 6:34.**

**Fourth quarter**

- KC – Al Dixon 13-yard pass from Steve Fuller (Nick Lowery kick), 10:55. Saints 17–14. **Drive: 10 plays, 80 yards, 4:33.**
- NO – Jeff Groth 6-yard pass from Ken Stabler (Toni Fritsch kick), 9:35. Saints 24–14. **Drive: 4 plays, 18 yards, 1:20.**
- KC – Nick Lowery 35-yard field goal, 6:12. Saints 24–17. **Drive: 7 plays, 53 yards, 3:23.**
- NO – Toni Fritsch 42-yard field goal, 0:24. Saints 27–17. **Drive: 12 plays, 40 yards, 5:48.**

**Top passers**

- KC – Steve Fuller – 9/14, 117 yards, TD
- NO – Ken Stabler – 13/18, 129 yards, TD, INT

**Top rushers**

- KC – Joe Delaney – 11 rushes, 71 yards
- NO – George Rogers – 33 rushes, 123 yards, TD

**Top receivers**

- KC – J. T. Smith – 6 receptions, 101 yards
- NO – Jeff Groth – 4 receptions, 68 yards, TD

==== Week 12: at Los Angeles Rams ====
Week 12: Kansas City Chiefs at Los Angeles Rams – Game summary

Quarter	1	2	3	4	Total
Chiefs	7	0	0	7	**14**
**Rams**	0	14	6	0	**20**

at Anaheim Stadium, Anaheim, California

- Date: November 28
- Game time: 1:00 p.m. PST
- Game weather: Cloudy, 70 °F (21 °C)
- Game attendance: 45,793
- Referee: Chuck Heberling
- TV announcers (NBC): Phil Stone and Gene Washington
- Recap, Game Book

Game information

**First quarter**

- KC – Billy Jackson 1-yard run (Nick Lowery kick), 5:50. Chiefs 7–0. **Drive: 18 plays, 68 yards, 9:10.**

**Second quarter**

- LA – Wendell Tyler 1-yard run (Mike Lansford kick), 8:52. Tied 7–7. **Drive: 8 plays, 62 yards, 4:29.**
- LA – Wendell Tyler 23-yard run (Mike Lansford kick), 2:02. Rams 14–7. **Drive: 11 plays, 75 yards, 5:30.**

**Third quarter**

- LA – LeRoy Irvin 63-yard punt return (kick blocked), 3:54. Rams 20–7.

**Fourth quarter**

- KC – J.T. Smith 35 yard pass from Steve Fuller (Nick Lowery kick), 11:07. Rams 20–14. **Drive: 3 plays, 43 yards, 1:34.**

**Top passers**

- KC – Steve Fuller – 12/27, 163 yards, TD, INT
- LA – Bert Jones – 6/12, 67 yards, INT

**Top rushers**

- KC – Joe Delaney – 18 rushes, 69 yards
- LA – Wendell Tyler – 25 rushes, 138 yards, 2 TD

**Top receivers**

- KC – Henry Marshall – 6 receptions, 71 yards
- LA – Mike Guman – 2 receptions, 39 yards

==== Week 13: at Pittsburgh Steelers ====
Week 13: Kansas City Chiefs at Pittsburgh Steelers – Game summary

Quarter	1	2	3	4	Total
Chiefs	0	7	0	7	**14**
**Steelers**	14	14	0	7	**35**

at Three Rivers Stadium, Pittsburgh, Pennsylvania

- Date: December 5
- Game time: 1:00 p.m. EST
- Game weather: Overcast, 62 °F (17 °C)
- Game attendance: 52,090
- Referee: Red Cashion
- TV announcers (NBC): Jay Randolph and Bob Griese
- Recap, Game Book

Game information

**First quarter**

- PIT – John Stallworth 3-yard pass from Terry Bradshaw (Gary Anderson kick), 7:30. Steelers 7–0. **Drive: 6 plays, 26 yards, 3:28.**
- PIT – John Stallworth 74-yard pass from Terry Bradshaw (Gary Anderson kick), 3:08. Steelers 14–0. **Drive: 3 plays, 80 yards, 1:39.**

**Second quarter**

- PIT – Greg Hawthorne 5-yard pass from Terry Bradshaw (Gary Anderson kick), 12:50. Steelers 21–0. **Drive: 7 plays, 58 yards, 4:08.**
- KC – Billy Jackson 1-yard run (Nick Lowery kick), 3:27. Steelers 21–7. **Drive: 17 plays, 78 yards, 9:23.**
- PIT – Franco Harris 1-yard run (Gary Anderson kick), 0:16. Steelers 28–7. **Drive: 9 plays, 76 yards, 3:11.**

**Third quarter**

- No scoring plays.

**Fourth quarter**

- KC – Willie Scott 3 yard pass from Steve Fuller (Nick Lowery kick), 8:50. Steelers 28–14. **Drive: 6 plays, 50 yards, 1:51.**
- PIT – Sidney Thornton 2-yard run (Gary Anderson kick), 1:52. Steelers 35–14. **Drive: 11 plays, 73 yards, 6:58.**

**Top passers**

- KC – Steve Fuller – 18/31, 249 yards, TD, INT
- PIT – Terry Bradshaw – 15/20, 231 yards, 3 TD, INT

**Top rushers**

- KC – Joe Delaney – 10 rushes, 39 yards
- PIT – Franco Harris – 18 rushes, 68 yards, TD

**Top receivers**

- KC – Henry Marshall – 5 receptions, 98 yards
- PIT – John Stallworth – 4 receptions, 107 yards, 2 TD

==== Week 14: vs. Los Angeles Raiders ====
Week 14: Los Angeles Raiders at Kansas City Chiefs – Game summary

Quarter	1	2	3	4	Total
**Raiders**	0	7	0	14	**21**
Chiefs	3	3	3	7	**16**

at Arrowhead Stadium, Kansas City, Missouri

- Date: December 12
- Game time: 3:00 p.m. CST
- Game weather: Clear, 29 °F (−2 °C)
- Game attendance: 26,307
- Referee: Fred Wyant
- TV announcers (NBC): Charlie Jones and Len Dawson
- Recap, Game Book

Game information

**First quarter**

- KC – Nick Lowery 35-yard field goal, 5:12. Chiefs 3–0. **Drive: 9 plays, 41 yards, 4:01.**

**Second quarter**

- RAI – Todd Christensen 4-yard pass from Jim Plunkett (Chris Bahr kick), 11:16. Raiders 7–3. **Drive: 9 plays, 71 yards, 3:38.**
- KC – Nick Lowery 27-yard field goal, 3:08. Raiders 7–6. **Drive: 11 plays, 64 yards, 6:08.**

**Third quarter**

- KC – Nick Lowery 29-yard field goal, 0:58. Chiefs 9–7. **Drive: 4 plays, –9 yards, 1:07.**

**Fourth quarter**

- RAI – Todd Christensen 8-yard pass from Jim Plunkett (Chris Bahr kick), 5:21. Raiders 14–9. **Drive: 3 plays, 67 yards, 1:00.**
- KC – Billy Jackson 1-yard run (Nick Lowery kick), 1:55. Chiefs 16–14. **Drive: 7 plays, 85 yards, 3:26.**
- RAI – Calvin Muhammad 35-yard pass from Jim Plunkett (Chris Bahr kick), 0:25. Raiders 21–16. **Drive: 7 plays, 80 yards, 1:30.**

**Top passers**

- RAI – Jim Plunkett – 18/33, 303 yards, 3 TD, INT
- KC – Steve Fuller – 10/21, 136 yards

**Top rushers**

- RAI – Marcus Allen – 18 rushes, 47 yards
- KC – Joe Delaney – 13 rushes, 32 yards

**Top receivers**

- RAI – Cliff Branch – 5 receptions, 111 yards
- KC – Al Dixon – 6 receptions, 102 yards

==== Week 15: at Denver Broncos ====
Week 15: Kansas City Chiefs at Denver Broncos – Game summary

Quarter	1	2	3	4	Total
**Chiefs**	3	7	10	17	**37**
Broncos	0	13	3	0	**16**

at Mile High Stadium, Denver, Colorado

- Date: December 19
- Game time: 2:00 p.m. MST
- Game weather: Partly Cloudy, 55 °F (13 °C)
- Game attendance: 74,192
- Referee: Jim Tunney
- TV announcers (NBC): Marv Albert and Bob Trumpy
- Recap, Game Book

Game information

**First quarter**

- KC – Nick Lowery 47-yard field goal, 11:14. Chiefs 3–0. **Drive: 6 plays, 15 yards, 2:10.**

**Second quarter**

- KC – Eric Harris 56-yard interception return (Nick Lowery kick), 9:10. Chiefs 10–0.
- DEN – Gerald Willhite 2-yard run (kick failed, wide right), 3:26. Chiefs 10–6. **Drive: 10 plays, 78 yards, 5:44.**
- DEN – Rick Upchurch 78-yard punt return (Rich Karlis kick), 1:26. Broncos 13–10.

**Third quarter**

- KC – Al Dixon 1-yard pass from Bill Kenney (Nick Lowery kick), 12:50. Chiefs 17–13. **Drive: 5 plays, 28 yards, 2:10.**
- DEN – Rich Karlis 44-yard field goal, 3:56. Chiefs 17–16. **Drive: 9 plays, 16 yards, 4:20.**
- KC – Nick Lowery 19-yard field goal, 0:16. Chiefs 20–16. **Drive: 7 plays, 72 yards, 3:40.**

**Fourth quarter**

- KC – Nick Lowery 23-yard field goal, 6:23. Chiefs 23–16. **Drive: 15 plays, 76 yards, 5:57.**
- KC – Carlos Carson 33-yard pass from Bill Kenney (Nick Lowery kick), 2:06. Chiefs 30–16. **Drive: 6 plays, 40 yards, 3:09.**
- KC – Gary Barbaro 43-yard interception return, 1:38. Chiefs 37–16.

**Top passers**

- KC – Bill Kenney – 12/26, 188 yards, 2 TD, INT
- DEN – Steve DeBerg – 19/30, 163 yards, 2 INT

**Top rushers**

- KC – James Hadnot – 13 rushes, 49 yards
- DEN – Gerald Willhite – 12 rushes, 46 yards, TD

**Top receivers**

- KC – Carlos Carson – 3 receptions, 110 yards, TD
- DEN – Dave Preston – 5 receptions, 49 yards

==== Week 16: vs. San Francisco 49ers ====
Week 16: San Francisco 49ers at Kansas City Chiefs – Game summary

Quarter	1	2	3	4	Total
**49ers**	3	0	6	17	**26**
Chiefs	3	7	0	3	**13**

at Arrowhead Stadium, Kansas City, Missouri

- Date: December 26
- Game time: 12:00 p.m. CST
- Game weather: Cloudy, 30 °F (−1 °C)
- Game attendance: 24,319
- Referee: Jerry Seeman
- TV announcers (CBS): Dick Stockton and Jim Hill
- Recap, Game Book

Game information

**First quarter**

- KC – Nick Lowery 40-yard field goal, 9:16. Chiefs 3–0. **Drive: 12 plays, 45 yards, 5:42.**
- SF – Ray Wersching 32-yard field goal, 4:09. Tied 3–3. **Drive: 13 plays, 57 yards, 5:07.**

**Second quarter**

- KC – Anthony Hancock 41-yard pass from Bill Kenney (Nick Lowery kick), 8:36. Chiefs 10–3. **Drive: 9 plays, 80 yards, 5:03.**

**Third quarter**

- SF – Ray Wersching 44-yard field goal, 12:04. Chiefs 10–6. **Drive: 5 plays, 37 yards, 2:56.**
- SF – Ray Wersching 42-yard field goal, 3:27. Chiefs 10–9. **Drive: 11 plays, 53 yards, 4:22.**

**Fourth quarter**

- SF – Jeff Moore 1-yard run (Ray Wersching kick), 13:21. 49ers 16–10. **Drive: 9 plays, 72 yards, 3:23.**
- KC – Nick Lowery 39-yard field goal, 8:30. 49ers 16–13. **Drive: 6 plays, 8 yards, 3:06.**
- SF – Ray Wersching 34-yard field goal, 1:56. 49ers 19–13. **Drive: 12 plays, 60 yards, 6:34.**
- SF – Ronnie Lott 83-yard interception return (Ray Wersching kick), 0:11. 49ers 26–13.

**Top passers**

- SF – Joe Montana – 20/35, 253 yards, 2 INT
- KC – Bill Kenney – 14/30, 181 yards, TD, INT

**Top rushers**

- SF – Jeff Moore – 18 rushes, 56 yards, TD
- KC – James Hadnot – 16 rushes, 55 yards

**Top receivers**

- SF – Dwight Clark – 4 receptions, 104 yards
- KC – Carlos Carson – 4 receptions, 76 yards

==== Week 17: vs. New York Jets ====
Week 17: New York Jets at Kansas City Chiefs – Game summary

Quarter	1	2	3	4	Total
Jets	6	0	0	7	**13**
**Chiefs**	7	20	0	10	**37**

at Arrowhead Stadium, Kansas City, Missouri

- Date: January 2
- Game time: 12:00 p.m. CST
- Game weather: Cloudy, 32 °F (0 °C)
- Game attendance: 11,902
- Referee: Pat Haggerty
- TV announcers (NBC): Marv Albert and Jim Turner
- Recap, Game Book

Game information

**First quarter**

- NYJ – Pat Leahy 30-yard field goal, 9:32. Jets 3–0. **Drive: 8 plays, 55 yards, 5:28.**
- NYJ – Pat Leahy 20-yard field goal, 5:46. Jets 6–0. **Drive: 6 plays, 30 yards, 3:27.**
- KC – Carlos Carson 28-yard pass from Bill Kenney (Nick Lowery kick), 2:10. Chiefs 7–6. **Drive: 9 plays, 74 yards, 3:36.**

**Second quarter**

- KC – Henry Marshall 13-yard pass from Bill Kenney (Nick Lowery kick), 8:49. Chiefs 14–6. **Drive: 10 plays, 75 yards, 6:30.**
- KC – Gary Green 42-yard interception return (Nick Lowery kick), 7:11. Chiefs 21–6.
- KC – Nick Lowery 44-yard field goal, 1:50. Chiefs 24–6. **Drive: 7 plays, 25 yards, 3:23.**
- KC – Nick Lowery 43-yard field goal, 0:00. Chiefs 27–6. **Drive: 7 plays, 35 yards, 1:08.**

**Third quarter**

- No scoring plays.

**Fourth quarter**

- KC – Henry Marshall 5-yard pass from Bill Kenney (Nick Lowery kick), 13:26. Chiefs 34–6. **Drive: 9 plays, 57 yards, 5:17.**
- KC – Nick Lowery 44-yard field goal, 7:30. Chiefs 37–6. **Drive: 6 plays, 53 yards, 2:52.**
- NYJ – Mickey Shuler 10-yard pass from Pat Ryan (Pat Leahy kick), 5:02. Chiefs 37–13. **Drive: 10 plays, 89 yards, 2:28.**

**Top passers**

- NYJ – Richard Todd – 14/29, 109 yards, INT
- KC – Bill Kenney – 18/27, 223 yards, 3 TD, INT

**Top rushers**

- NYJ – Freeman McNeil – 12 rushes, 83 yards
- KC – James Hadnot – 10 rushes, 58 yards

**Top receivers**

- NYJ – Wesley Walker – 4 receptions, 56 yards
- KC – Carlos Carson – 4 receptions, 95 yards, TD

=== Standings ===
AFC West
	W	L	T	PCT	DIV	CONF	PF	PA	STK
^{(1)} Los Angeles Raiders	8	1	0	.889	5–0	5–1	260	200	W5
^{(5)} San Diego Chargers	6	3	0	.667	2–3	5–3	288	221	L1
Seattle Seahawks	4	5	0	.444	2–1	3–5	127	147	W1
Kansas City Chiefs	3	6	0	.333	2–1	3–3	176	184	W1
Denver Broncos	2	7	0	.222	0–6	0–6	148	226	L3

AFC
#	Team	W	L	T	PCT	PF	PA	STK
**Seeded postseason qualifiers**
1	Los Angeles Raiders	8	1	0	.889	260	200	W5
2 (Note: Miami finished ahead of Cincinnati based on better conference record (6–1 to Cincinnati’s 6–2).)	Miami Dolphins	7	2	0	.778	198	131	W3
3	Cincinnati Bengals	7	2	0	.778	232	177	W2
4 (Note: Pittsburgh finished ahead of San Diego based on better record against common opponents (3–1 to Chargers' 2–1). Conference tiebreak was initially used to eliminate New York Jets.) (Note: Pittsburgh and San Diego finished ahead of New York Jets based on conference record (Pittsburgh and San Diego 5–3 against Jets’ 2–3))	Pittsburgh Steelers	6	3	0	.667	204	146	W2
5	San Diego Chargers	6	3	0	.667	288	221	L1
6	New York Jets	6	3	0	.667	245	166	L1
7	New England Patriots	5	4	0	.556	143	157	W1
8 (Note: Cleveland finished ahead of Buffalo and Buffalo ahead of Seattle based on conference record (4–3 to Buffalo’s 3–3 to Seattle’s 3–5).)	Cleveland Browns	4	5	0	.444	140	182	L1
**Did not qualify for the postseason**
9	Buffalo Bills	4	5	0	.444	150	154	L3
10	Seattle Seahawks	4	5	0	.444	127	147	W1
11	Kansas City Chiefs	3	6	0	.333	176	184	W1
12	Denver Broncos	2	7	0	.222	148	226	L3
13	Houston Oilers	1	8	0	.111	136	245	L7
14	Baltimore Colts	0	8	1	.056	113	236	L2
**Tiebreakers**
