= 1980 Kansas City Chiefs season =

NFL team season

- Owner: Lamar Hunt
- General manager: Jim Schaaf
- Head coach: Marv Levy
- Home stadium: Arrowhead Stadium

Results
- Record: 8–8
- Division place: 3rd AFC West
- Playoffs: Did not qualify
- All-Pros: 3: DE Art Still (2nd team); S Gary Barbaro (2nd team); KR J. T. Smith (1st team)
- Pro Bowlers: 3: WR J. T. Smith; DE Art Still; S Gary Barbaro

The 1980 Kansas City Chiefs season was the franchise's 11th season in the National Football League and 21st overall. They improved from 1979 from a 7–9 to an 8–8 record, the most wins for the franchise since an 8–6 season in 1972, but missed the playoffs for the ninth consecutive season.

The Chiefs selected guard Brad Budde, the son of Chiefs Hall of Fame guard Ed Budde, as the team's first-round draft choice, making the Buddes the first father-son combination to become first-round draftees of the same team in NFL history. In a then-controversial move on August 26, the Chiefs released placekicker Jan Stenerud, who at the time was club's all-time leading scorer. He was replaced by journeyman Nick Lowery, who had been cut 11 times by eight different teams himself.

After suffering an 0–4 start, the team rebounded to post a four-game winning streak. After Steve Fuller was sidelined with a knee injury late in the season, former Miami 12th-round draft choice Bill Kenney became the team's starting quarterback. He was so anonymous that when he appeared in that contest, the name on the back of his jersey was inadvertently misspelled "Kenny." Kenney went on to lead the club to a 31–14 victory against Denver on December 7 in his initial NFL start. The defense continued to evolve as defensive end Art Still and safety Gary Barbaro became the first Chiefs defensive players to be elected to the Pro Bowl in five seasons.

== Offseason ==
=== NFL draft ===
1980 Kansas City Chiefs draft
Round	Pick	Player	Position	College	Notes
1	11	Brad Budde	Guard	USC	
3	66	James Hadnot	Running back	Texas Tech	
4	94	Dave Klug	Linebacker	Concordia–Moorhead	Played for Chiefs 1981–83
5	114	Carlos Carson *	Wide receiver	LSU	
5	115	Dan Pensick	Defensive tackle	Nebraska	
6	147	Bubba Garcia	Wide receiver	UTEP	
6	164	Larry Heater	Running back	Arizona	
8	203	Sam Stepney	Linebacker	Boston University	
9	230	Tom Donovan	Wide receiver	Penn State	
10	261	Rob Martinovich	Tackle	Notre Dame	
11	287	Dale Markham	Tackle	North Dakota	
12	314	Mike Brewington	Linebacker	East Carolina	
Made roster * Made at least one Pro Bowl during career

=== Undrafted free agents ===
1980 undrafted free agents of note
Player	Position	College
Tyrone Crews	Linebacker	Kansas State
Dino Mangiero	Defensive tackle	Rutgers

== Personnel ==
=== Staff ===
1980 Kansas City Chiefs staff
Front office: Founder – Lamar Hunt; President – Jack Steadman; Vice President and General Manager – Jim Schaaf; Director of Player Personnel – Les Miller; Head coaches: Head Coach – Marv Levy; Offensive coaches: Quarterbacks and Receivers – Kay Dalton; Offensive Backs – Bobby Ross; Offensive Line – Joe Spencer	Defensive coaches: Defensive Coordinator/Linebackers – Rod Rust; Defensive Line – Walt Corey; Defensive Backs – Dick Roach; Special teams coaches: Kicking Teams – Don Lawrence; Strength and conditioning: Strength and Conditioning – Rick Abernethy

=== Roster ===
1980 Kansas City Chiefs roster
Quarterbacks (QB): 2 Tom Clements; 9 Bill Kenney; Running backs (RB): 35 Horace Belton; 48 James Hadnot; 22 Ted McKnight; 32 Tony Reed; 45 Ken Talton; Wide receivers (WR): 88 Carlos Carson; 80 Bubba Garcia; 89 Henry Marshall; 86 J. T. Smith; Tight ends (TE): 85 Ed Beckman; 84 Al Dixon; 83 Mike Williams	Offensive linemen (OL): 56 Charlie Ane C; 66 Brad Budde G; 65 Tom Condon G; 72 Brad Oates T; 70 Jim Rourke T; 58 Jack Rudnay C; 73 Bob Simmons G/T; Defensive linemen (DL): 75 Sylvester Hicks DE; 91 Ken Kremer DE; 71 Dave Lindstrom DE; 74 Dino Mangiero NT; 61 Don Parrish NT; 67 Art Still DE	Linebackers (LB): 57 Jerry Blanton ILB; 52 Thomas Howard OLB; 51 Charles Jackson OLB; 62 Kelly Kirchbaum ILB; 54 Frank Manumaleuga ILB; 53 Whitney Paul OLB; 50 Cal Peterson OLB; 55 Clarence Sanders OLB; 59 Gary Spani ILB; Defensive backs (DB): 25 Gary Barbaro FS; 41 Herb Christopher SS; 46 Paul Dombroski CB/S; 24 Gary Green CB; 44 Eric Harris CB; 31 Jerry Reese SS; 27 Donovan Rose CB; Special teams (ST): 1 Bob Grupp P; 8 Nick Lowery K	Reserve: 99 Mike Bell DE (IR); 42 M. L. Carter CB (IR); 4 Steve Fuller QB (IR); 23 Earl Gant RB (IR); 77 Charlie Getty T (IR); 60 Matt Herkenhoff T (IR); -- Dave Klug LB (IR); 21 Arnold Morgado RB (IR); 87 Stan Rome WR (IR); -- Charlie Taylor WR (IR); Rookies in italics

== Preseason ==
Week	Date	Opponent	Result	Record	Venue	Attendance	Recap
1	August 9	Cleveland Browns	W 42–0	1–0	Arrowhead Stadium	38,055	Recap
2	August 18	Minnesota Vikings	W 24–10	2–0	Arrowhead Stadium	39,879	Recap
3	August 23	at St. Louis Cardinals	W 20–10	3–0	Busch Memorial Stadium	41,687	Recap
4	August 30	vs. San Francisco 49ers	L 21–31	3–1	Arizona Stadium (Tucson, Arizona)	27,000	Recap

== Regular season ==
=== Schedule ===
Week	Date	Opponent	Result	Record	Venue	Attendance	Recap
1	September 7	**Oakland Raiders**	**L** 14–27	0–1	Arrowhead Stadium	54,269	Recap
2	September 14	**Seattle Seahawks**	**L** 16–17	0–2	Arrowhead Stadium	42,403	Recap
3	September 21	at Cleveland Browns	**L** 13–20	0–3	Cleveland Stadium	63,614	Recap
4	September 28	**San Diego Chargers**	**L** 7–24	0–4	Arrowhead Stadium	45,161	Recap
5	October 5	at **Oakland Raiders**	**W** 31–17	1–4	Oakland–Alameda County Coliseum	40,153	Recap
6	October 12	Houston Oilers	**W** 21–20	2–4	Arrowhead Stadium	75,048	Recap
7	October 19	at **Denver Broncos**	**W** 23–17	3–4	Mile High Stadium	74,459	Recap
8	October 26	Detroit Lions	**W** 20–17	4–4	Arrowhead Stadium	59,391	Recap
9	November 2	Baltimore Colts	**L** 24–31	4–5	Arrowhead Stadium	52,383	Recap
10	November 9	at **Seattle Seahawks**	**W** 31–30	5–5	Kingdome	58,976	Recap
11	November 16	at **San Diego Chargers**	**L** 7–20	5–6	San Diego Stadium	50,248	Recap
12	November 23	at St. Louis Cardinals	**W** 21–13	6–6	Busch Memorial Stadium	42,871	Recap
13	November 30	Cincinnati Bengals	**L** 6–20	6–7	Arrowhead Stadium	41,594	Recap
14	December 7	**Denver Broncos**	**W** 31–14	7–7	Arrowhead Stadium	40,237	Recap
15	December 14	at Pittsburgh Steelers	**L** 16–21	7–8	Three Rivers Stadium	50,013	Recap
16	December 21	at Baltimore Colts	**W** 38–28	8–8	Memorial Stadium	16,941	Recap
Note: Intra-division opponents are in **bold** text.

=== Game summaries ===
==== Week 1: vs. Oakland Raiders ====
Week 1: Oakland Raiders at Kansas City Chiefs – Game summary

Quarter	1	2	3	4	Total
**Raiders**	7	0	14	6	**27**
Chiefs	7	0	0	7	**14**

at Arrowhead Stadium, Kansas City, Missouri

- Date: September 7
- Game time: 3:00 p.m. CDT
- Game weather: Sunny and clear, 94 °F (34 °C)
- Game attendance: 54,269
- Referee: Pat Haggerty
- TV announcers (NBC): Jay Randolph and Gene Washington
- Recap

Game information

**First quarter**

- KC – Ted McKnight 7-yard run (Nick Lowery kick), 8:25. Chiefs 7–0. **Drive: 11 plays, 70 yards, 6:35.**
- OAK – Bob Chandler 16-yard pass from Dan Pastorini (Chris Bahr kick), 2:21. Tie 7–7. **Drive: 12 plays, 88 yards, 6:04.**

**Second quarter**

- No scoring plays.

**Third quarter**

- OAK – Mark van Eeghen 1-yard run (Chris Bahr kick), 3:01. Raiders 14–7. **Drive: 8 plays, 69 yards, 3:07.**
- OAK – Bob Chandler 32-yard pass from Dan Pastorini (Chris Bahr kick), 0:40. Raiders 21–7. **Drive: 1 play, 32 yards, 0:07.**

**Fourth quarter**

- OAK – Chris Bahr 41-yard field goal, 12:49. Raiders 24–7. **Drive: 6 plays, 13 yards, 2:31.**
- KC – Tony Samuels 4-yard pass from Steve Fuller (Nick Lowery kick), 8:54. Raiders 24–14. **Drive: 9 plays, 78 yards, 3:55.**
- OAK – Chris Bahr 39-yard field goal, 1:25. Raiders 27–14. **Drive: 4 plays, 6 yards, 0:38.**

Top passers

- OAK – Dan Pastorini – 19/37, 317 yards, 2 TD
- KC – Steve Fuller – 16/28, 196 yards, TD, 3 INT

Top rushers

- OAK – Mark van Eeghen – 16 rushes, 54 yards, TD
- KC – Ted McKnight – 14 rushes, 77 yards, TD

Top receivers

- OAK – Bob Chandler – 5 receptions, 85 yards, 2 TD
- KC – Henry Marshall – 3 receptions, 83 yards

==== Week 2: vs. Seattle Seahawks ====
Week 2: Seattle Seahawks at Kansas City Chiefs – Game summary

Quarter	1	2	3	4	Total
**Seahawks**	7	10	0	0	**17**
Chiefs	0	7	6	3	**16**

at Arrowhead Stadium, Kansas City, Missouri

- Date: September 14
- Game time: 1:00 p.m. CDT
- Game weather: Sunny, 75 °F (24 °C)
- Game attendance: 42,403
- Referee: Dick Jorgensen
- TV announcers (NBC): Mike Adamle and Bob Trumpy
- Box score

Game information

**First quarter**

- SEA – Sam McCullum 12-yard pass from Jim Zorn (Efrén Herrera kick), 0:40. Seahawks 7–0. **Drive: 11 plays, 69 yards, 3:59.**

**Second quarter**

- SEA – Efrén Herrera 19-yard field goal, 9:05. Seahawks 10–0. **Drive: 10 plays, 49 yards, 4:45.**
- SEA – Sherman Smith 7-yard pass from Jim Zorn (Efrén Herrera kick), 1:55. Seahawks 17–0. **Drive: 7 plays, 50 yards, 2:35.**
- KC – Henry Marshall 1-yard pass from Steve Fuller (Nick Lowery kick), 0:06. Seahawks 17–7. **Drive: 8 plays, 63 yards, 1:49.**

**Third quarter**

- KC – Nick Lowery 50-yard field goal, 5:37. Seahawks 17–10. **Drive: 8 plays, 46 yards, 4:18.**
- KC – Nick Lowery 23-yard field goal, 1:15. Seahawks 17–13. **Drive: 6 plays, 22 yards, 3:23.**

**Fourth quarter**

- KC – Nick Lowery 57-yard field goal, 8:35. Seahawks 17–16. **Drive: 8 plays, 33 yards, 4:48.**

Top passers

- SEA – Jim Zorn – 17/27, 194 yards, 2 TD, INT
- KC – Steve Fuller – 20/31, 184 yards, TD

Top rushers

- SEA – Dan Doornink – 12 rushes, 32 yards
- KC – Ted McKnight – 9 rushes, 28 yards

Top receivers

- SEA – Sam McCullum – 6 receptions, 96 yards, TD
- KC – J.T. Smith – 5 receptions, 78 yards

==== Week 3: at Cleveland Browns ====
Week 3: Kansas City Chiefs at Cleveland Browns – Game summary

Quarter	1	2	3	4	Total
Chiefs	0	6	7	0	**13**
**Browns**	0	7	13	0	**20**

at Cleveland Municipal Stadium, Cleveland, Ohio

- Date: September 21
- Game time: 1:00 p.m. EDT
- Game weather: Sunny, clear, 82 °F (28 °C)
- Game attendance: 63,614
- Referee: Jim Tunney
- TV announcers (NBC): Merle Harmon and Carl Eller
- Box score

Game information

**First quarter**

- No scoring plays.

**Second quarter**

- KC – Nick Lowery 38-yard field goal, 14:52. Chiefs 3–0. **Drive: 9 plays, 42 yards, 4:48.**
- KC – Nick Lowery 22-yard field goal, 6:04. Chiefs 6–0. **Drive: 13 plays, 57 yards, 5:46.**
- CLE – Charles White 2-yard run (Don Cockroft kick), 2:45. Browns 7–6. **Drive: 8 plays, 41 yards, 3:19.**

**Third quarter**

- CLE – Keith Wright 12-yard pass from Brian Sipe (kick blocked), 10:09. Browns 13–6. **Drive: 10 plays, 79 yards, 4:51.**
- KC – Tony Samuels 16-yard pass from Steve Fuller (Nick Lowery kick), 4:42. Tied 13–13. **Drive: 4 plays, 39 yards, 2:05.**
- CLE – Charles White 31-yard pass from Brian Sipe (Don Cockroft kick), 3:19. Browns 20–13. **Drive: 4 plays, 66 yards, 1:23.**

**Fourth quarter**

- No scoring plays.

Top passers

- KC – Steve Fuller – 15/26, 193 yards, TD
- CLE – Brian Sipe – 23/36, 295 yards, 2 TD, INT

Top rushers

- KC – Ted McKnight – 13 rushes, 35 yards
- CLE – Charles White – 15 rushes, 59 yards, TD

Top receivers

- KC – Tony Samuels – 4 receptions, 79 yards, TD
- CLE – Charles White – 7 receptions, 100 yards, TD

==== Week 4: vs. San Diego Chargers ====
Week 4: San Diego Chargers at Kansas City Chiefs – Game summary

Quarter	1	2	3	4	Total
**Chargers**	7	14	3	0	**24**
Chiefs	0	7	0	0	**7**

at Arrowhead Stadium, Kansas City, Missouri

- Date: September 28
- Game time: 3:00 p.m. CDT
- Game weather: Overcast skies, 64 °F (18 °C)
- Game attendance: 45,161
- Referee: Gene Barth
- TV announcers (NBC): Jay Randolph and Gene Washington
- Box score

Game information

**First quarter**

- SD – John Cappelletti 3-yard run (Rolf Benirschke kick), 0:40. Chargers 7–0. **Drive: 1 play, 3 yards, 0:04.**

**Second quarter**

- KC – Ted McKnight 1-yard run (Nick Lowery kick), 8:28. Tied 7–7. **Drive: 13 plays, 80 yards, 7:12.**
- SD – Kellen Winslow 15-yard pass from Dan Fouts (Rolf Benirschke kick), 2:02. Chargers 14–7. **Drive: 3 plays, 32 yards, 1:18.**
- SD – Kellen Winslow 16-yard pass from Dan Fouts (Rolf Benirschke kick), 0:33. Chargers 21–7. **Drive: 3 plays, 58 yards, 0:22.**

**Third quarter**

- SD – Rolf Benirschke 32-yard field goal, 12:05. Chargers 24–7. **Drive: 5 plays, 15 yards, 1:55.**

**Fourth quarter**

- No scoring plays.

Top passers

- SD – Dan Fouts – 15/30, 194 yards, 2 TD
- KC – Tom Clements – 7/12, 77 yards

Top rushers

- SD – John Cappelletti – 18 rushes, 51 yards, TD
- KC – Ted McKnight – 11 rushes, 34 yards, TD

Top receivers

- SD – Kellen Winslow – 6 receptions, 74 yards, 2 TD
- KC – Ted McKnight – 5 receptions, 36 yards

==== Week 5: at Oakland Raiders ====
Week 5: Kansas City Chiefs at Oakland Raiders – Game summary

Quarter	1	2	3	4	Total
**Chiefs**	14	17	0	0	**31**
Raiders	0	3	0	14	**17**

at Oakland–Alameda County Coliseum, Oakland, California

- Date: October 5
- Game time: 1:00 p.m. PDT
- Game weather: Clear, 66 °F (19 °C)
- Game attendance: 40,153
- Referee: Red Cashion
- TV announcers (NBC): Jay Randolph and Gene Washington
- Box score

Game information

**First quarter**

- KC – Gary Spani 16-yard fumble return (Nick Lowery kick), 9:34. Chiefs 7–0.
- KC – Ted McKnight 1-yard run (Nick Lowery kick), 4:03. Chiefs 14–0. **Drive: 5 plays, 60 yards, 2:51.**

**Second quarter**

- KC – Nick Lowery 35-yard field goal, 5:03. Chiefs 17–0. **Drive: 7 plays, 23 yards, 3:09.**
- KC – Arnold Morgado 1-yard run (Nick Lowery kick), 0:53. Chiefs 24–0. **Drive: 5 plays, 46 yards, 1:40.**
- KC – Whitney Paul 32-yard fumble return (Nick Lowery kick), 0:39. Chiefs 31–0.
- OAK – Chris Bahr 39-yard field goal, 0:00. Chiefs 31–3. **Drive: 5 plays, 43 yards, 0:39.**

**Third quarter**

- No scoring plays.

**Fourth quarter**

- OAK – Cliff Branch 10-yard pass from Jim Plunkett (Chris Bahr kick), 12:50. Chiefs 31–10. **Drive: 11 plays, 50 yards, 2:50.**
- OAK – Bob Chandler 6-yard pass from Jim Plunkett (Chris Bahr kick), 10:08. Chiefs 31–17. **Drive: 3 plays, 9 yards, 0:43.**

Top passers

- KC – Steve Fuller – 6/11, 65 yards, INT
- OAK – Jim Plunkett – 20/52, 238 yards, 2 TD, 5 INT

Top rushers

- KC – Ted McKnight – 24 rushes, 64 yards, TD
- OAK – Mark van Eeghen – 10 rushes, 24 yards

Top receivers

- KC – Henry Marshall – 3 receptions, 42 yards
- OAK – Cliff Branch – 6 receptions, 93 yards, TD

==== Week 6: vs. Houston Oilers ====
Week 6: Houston Oilers at Kansas City Chiefs – Game summary

Quarter	1	2	3	4	Total
Oilers	3	7	3	7	**20**
**Chiefs**	0	0	14	7	**21**

at Arrowhead Stadium, Kansas City, Missouri

- Date: October 12
- Game time: 3:00 p.m. CDT
- Game weather: Clear, 64 °F (18 °C)
- Game attendance: 75,048
- Referee: Bob McElwee
- TV announcers (NBC): Merle Harmon and Mike Haffner
- Box score

Game information

**First quarter**

- HOU – Toni Fritsch 41-yard field goal, 7:26. Oilers 3–0. **Drive: 12 plays, 63 yards, 7:34.**

**Second quarter**

- HOU – Earl Campbell 3-yard run (Toni Fritsch kick), 2:56. Oilers 10–0. **Drive: 15 plays, 83 yards, 8:54.**

**Third quarter**

- KC – Henry Marshall 31-yard pass from Steve Fuller (Nick Lowery kick), 11:28. Oilers 10–7. **Drive: 6 plays, 70 yards, 3:32.**
- KC – Gary Spani 47-yard interception return (Nick Lowery kick), 9:55. Chiefs 14–10.
- HOU – Toni Fritsch 46-yard field goal, 3:53. Chiefs 14–13. **Drive: 8 plays, 53 yards, 6:02.**

**Fourth quarter**

- HOU – Mike Barber 26-yard pass from Ken Stabler (Toni Fritsch kick), 8:05. Oilers 20–14. **Drive: 9 plays, 55 yards, 5:56.**
- KC – Steve Fuller 38-yard run (Nick Lowery kick), 2:51. Chiefs 21–20. **Drive: 10 plays, 76 yards, 5:14.**

Top passers

- HOU – Ken Stabler – 11/17, 131 yards, TD, 2 INT
- KC – Steve Fuller – 11/18, 148 yards, TD, INT

Top rushers

- HOU – Earl Campbell – 38 rushes, 178 yards, TD
- KC – Ted McKnight – 12 rushes, 63 yards

Top receivers

- HOU – Mike Barber – 4 receptions, 62 yards, TD
- KC – Tony Reed – 4 receptions, 54 yards

==== Week 7: at Denver Broncos ====
Week 7: Kansas City Chiefs at Denver Broncos – Game summary

Quarter	1	2	3	4	Total
**Chiefs**	3	10	7	3	**23**
Broncos	7	7	3	0	**17**

at Mile High Stadium, Denver, Colorado

- Date: October 19
- Game time: 12:00 p.m. MDT
- Game weather: Sunny, 63 °F (17 °C)
- Game attendance: 74,459
- Referee: Chuck Heberling
- TV announcers (KCMO-Kansas City): Don Fortune and Paul Maguire
- Box score

Game information

**First quarter**

- KC – Nick Lowery 37-yard field goal, 6:03. Chiefs 3–0. **Drive: 13 plays, 61 yards, 7:27.**
- DEN – Rick Upchurch 14-yard pass from Craig Morton (Fred Steinfort kick), 1:15. Broncos 7–3. **Drive: 10 plays, 79 yards, 4:38.**

**Second quarter**

- DEN – Riley Odoms 6-yard pass from Craig Morton (Fred Steinfort kick), 10:40. Broncos 14–3. **Drive: 8 plays, 52 yards, 3:45.**
- KC – Nick Lowery 39-yard field goal, 1:55. Broncos 14–6. **Drive: 10 plays, 47 yards, 5:11.**
- KC – Al Dixon 26-yard pass from Steve Fuller (Nick Lowery kick), 0:37. Broncos 14–13. **Drive: 3 plays, 40 yards, 0:21.**

**Third quarter**

- DEN – Fred Steinfort 41-yard field goal, 8:43. Broncos 17–13. **Drive: 9 plays, 27 yards, 4:04.**
- KC – Henry Marshall 46-yard pass from Steve Fuller (Nick Lowery kick), 0:00. Chiefs 20–17. **Drive: 3 plays, 44 yards, 1:24.**

**Fourth quarter**

- KC – Nick Lowery 34-yard field goal, 4:21. Chiefs 23–17. **Drive: 15 plays, 58 yards, 8:14.**

Top passers

- KC – Steve Fuller – 14/20, 189 yards, 2 TD
- DEN – Craig Morton – 18/31, 199 yards, 2 TD, 2 INT

Top rushers

- KC – Ted McKnight – 16 rushes, 63 yards
- DEN – Otis Armstrong – 11 rushes, 41 yards

Top receivers

- KC – Henry Marshall – 6 receptions, 103 yards, TD
- DEN – Rick Upchurch – 5 receptions, 79 yards, TD

==== Week 8: vs. Detroit Lions ====
Week 8: Detroit Lions at Kansas City Chiefs – Game summary

Quarter	1	2	3	4	Total
Lions	0	3	7	7	**17**
**Chiefs**	0	10	0	10	**20**

at Arrowhead Stadium, Kansas City, Missouri

- Date: October 26
- Game time: 3:00 p.m. CST
- Game weather: Clear, 52 °F (11 °C)
- Game attendance: 59,391
- Referee: Jerry Seeman
- TV announcers (CBS): Gary Bender and John Madden
- Box score

Game information

**First quarter**

- No scoring plays.

**Second quarter**

- KC – Nick Lowery 52-yard field goal, 14:56. Chiefs 3–0. **Drive: 10 plays, 39 yards, 7:07.**
- KC – Mike Williams 3-yard pass from Steve Fuller (Nick Lowery kick), 5:39. Chiefs 10–0. **Drive: 7 plays, 69 yards, 3:40.**
- DET – Eddie Murray 20-yard field goal, 0:05. Chiefs 10–3. **Drive: 14 plays, 96 yards, 5:39.**

**Third quarter**

- DET – Billy Sims 45-yard run (Eddie Murray kick), 5:35. Tied 10–10. **Drive: 1 plays, 45 yards, 0:09.**

**Fourth quarter**

- KC – Steve Fuller 1-yard run (Nick Lowery kick), 14:12. Chiefs 17–10. **Drive: 12 plays, 74 yards, 6:23.**
- DET – Billy Sims 1-yard run (Eddie Murray kick), 4:38. Tied 17–17. **Drive: 18 plays, 77 yards, 9:34.**
- KC – Nick Lowery 40-yard field goal, 1:14. Chiefs 20–17. **Drive: 8 plays, 58 yards, 3:24.**

Top passers

- DET – Gary Danielson – 7/19, 102 yards, 2 INT
- KC – Steve Fuller – 12/18, 186 yards, TD

Top rushers

- DET – Billy Sims – 28 rushes, 155 yards, 2 TD
- KC – Horace Belton – 12 rushes, 47 yards

Top receivers

- DET – Billy Sims – 2 receptions, 29 yards
- KC – J. T. Smith – 6 receptions, 87 yards

==== Week 9: vs. Baltimore Colts ====
Week 9: Baltimore Colts at Kansas City Chiefs – Game summary

Quarter	1	2	3	4	Total
**Colts**	7	7	14	3	**31**
Chiefs	3	14	7	0	**24**

at Arrowhead Stadium, Kansas City, Missouri

- Date: November 2
- Game time: 12:00 p.m. CST
- Game weather: Clear, 65 °F (18 °C)
- Game attendance: 52,383
- Referee: Bob Frederic
- TV announcers (NBC): Bob Costas and Gene Washington
- Box score

Game information

**First quarter**

- KC – Nick Lowery 27-yard field goal, 12:35. Chiefs 3–0. **Drive: 4 plays, 4 yards, 1:38.**
- BAL – Reese McCall 18-yard pass from Bert Jones (Steve Mike-Mayer kick), 8:02. Colts 7–3. **Drive: 12 plays, 78 yards, 4:33.**

**Second quarter**

- BAL – Don McCauley 7-yard pass from Bert Jones (Steve Mike-Mayer kick), 12:19. Colts 14–3. **Drive: 9 plays, 47 yards, 5:23.**
- KC – Horace Belton 8-yard run (Nick Lowery kick), 8:28. Colts 14–10. **Drive: 9 plays, 80 yards, 3:51.**
- KC – Steve Fuller 7-yard run (Nick Lowery kick), 0:23. Chiefs 17–14. **Drive: 10 plays, 37 yards, 2:43.**

**Third quarter**

- BAL – Curtis Dickey 2-yard run (Steve Mike-Mayer kick), 5:28. Colts 21–17. **Drive: 7 plays, 72 yards, 2:22.**
- KC – Horace Belton 3-yard run (Nick Lowery kick), 3:28. Chiefs 24–21. **Drive: 3 plays, 80 yards, 2:00.**
- BAL – Curtis Dickey 51-yard run (Steve Mike-Mayer kick), 1:38. Colts 28–24. **Drive: 5 plays, 84 yards, 1:50.**

**Fourth quarter**

- BAL – Steve Mike-Mayer 21-yard field goal, 7:41. Colts 31–24. **Drive: 10 plays, 42 yards, 4:25.**

Top passers

- BAL – Steve Mike-Mayer – 17/29, 211 yards, 2 TD, 2 INT
- KC – Steve Fuller – 15/29, 216 yards, INT

Top rushers

- BAL – Curtis Dickey – 9 rushes, 68 yards, 2 TD
- KC – Horace Belton – 12 rushes, 40 yards, 2 TD

Top receivers

- BAL – Reese McCall – 2 receptions, 65 yards, TD
- KC – J. T. Smith – 3 receptions, 91 yards

==== Week 10: at Seattle Seahawks ====
Week 10: Kansas City Chiefs at Seattle Seahawks – Game summary

Quarter	1	2	3	4	Total
**Chiefs**	3	0	7	21	**31**
Seahawks	0	17	6	7	**30**

at Kingdome, Seattle, Washington

- Date: November 9
- Game time: 1:00 p.m. PST
- Game weather: None (indoor stadium)
- Game attendance: 58,976
- Referee: Jim Tunney
- TV announcers (NBC): Mike Adamle and Mike Haffner
- Box score

Game information

**First quarter**

- KC – Nick Lowery 42-yard field goal, 3:51. Chiefs 3–0. **Drive: 7 plays, 39 yards, 2:27.**

**Second quarter**

- SEA – Larry Brinson 22-yard run (Efrén Herrera kick), 4:42. Seahawks 7–3. **Drive: 1 play, 22 yards, 0:05.**
- SEA – Efrén Herrera 39-yard field goal, 1:34. Seahawks 10–3. **Drive: 6 plays, 26 yards, 1:25.**
- SEA – Dan Doornink 4-yard pass from Jim Zorn (Efrén Herrera kick), 0:02. Seahawks 17–3. **Drive: 7 plays, 32 yards, 0:56.**

**Third quarter**

- KC – Tony Reed 12-yard pass from Steve Fuller (Nick Lowery kick), 14:34. Seahawks 17–10. **Drive: 1 play, 12 yards, 0:08.**
- SEA – Efrén Herrera 31-yard field goal, 9:23. Seahawks 20–10. **Drive: 12 plays, 60 yards, 5:00.**
- SEA – Efrén Herrera 33-yard field goal, 3:39. Seahawks 23–10. **Drive: 4 plays, 7 yards, 1:43.**

**Fourth quarter**

- KC – Henry Marshall 11-yard pass from Steve Fuller (Nick Lowery kick), 12:44. Seahawks 23–17. **Drive: 12 plays, 87 yards, 5:45.**
- KC – Frank Manumaleuga 22-yard interception return, 11:33. Chiefs 24–23.
- SEA – Jim Jodat 2-yard run (Efrén Herrera kick), 4:10. Seahawks 30–24. **Drive: 4 plays, 18 yards, 2:07.**
- KC – Arnold Morgado 1-yard run (Nick Lowery kick), 0:40. Chiefs 31–30. **Drive: 11 plays, 91 yards, 3:21.**

Top passers

- KC – Steve Fuller – 19/26, 233 yards, 2 TD, 2 INT
- SEA – Jim Zorn – 18/37, 189 yards, TD, 5 INT

Top rushers

- KC – Ted McKnight – 12 rushes, 26 yards
- SEA – Jim Jodat – 15 rushes, 57 yards, TD

Top receivers

- KC – Tony Reed – 6 receptions, 73 yards, TD
- SEA – Sam McCullum – 4 receptions, 57 yards

==== Week 11: at San Diego Chargers ====
Week 11: Kansas City Chiefs at San Diego Chargers – Game summary

Quarter	1	2	3	4	Total
Chiefs	7	0	0	0	**7**
**Chargers**	0	6	7	7	**20**

at Jack Murphy Stadium, San Diego, California

- Date: November 16
- Game time: 1:00 p.m. PST
- Game weather: Hazy, 68 °F (20 °C)
- Game attendance: 50,248
- Referee: Pat Haggerty
- TV announcers (NBC): Sam Nover and Bob Trumpy
- Box score

Game information

**First quarter**

- KC – Steve Fuller 4-yard run (Nick Lowery kick), 1:41. Chiefs 7–0. **Drive: 5 plays, 46 yards, 2:18.**

**Second quarter**

- SD – Mike Thomas 4-yard run (kick failed, hit right upright), 7:15. Chiefs 7–6. **Drive: 5 plays, 21 yards, 2:08.**

**Third quarter**

- SD – Mike Thomas 7-yard run (Rolf Benirschke kick), 5:36. Chargers 13–7. **Drive: 11 plays, 80 yards, 4:25.**

**Fourth quarter**

- SD – Clarence Williams 7-yard run (Rolf Benirschke kick), 6:21. Chargers 20–7. **Drive: 10 plays, 59 yards, 5:58.**

Top passers

- KC – Steve Fuller – 15/22, 135 yards
- SD – Dan Fouts – 22/39, 222 yards, INT

Top rushers

- KC – Horace Belton – 9 rushes, 38 yards
- SD – Mike Thomas – 27 rushes, 109 yards, 2 TD

Top receivers

- KC – Tony Reed – 7 receptions, 80 yards
- SD – Kellen Winslow – 5 receptions, 57 yards

==== Week 12: at St. Louis Cardinals ====
Week 12: Kansas City Chiefs at St. Louis Cardinals – Game summary

Quarter	1	2	3	4	Total
**Chiefs**	0	0	7	14	**21**
Cardinals	10	0	3	0	**13**

at Busch Memorial Stadium, St. Louis, Missouri

- Date: November 23
- Game time: 1:00 p.m. CST
- Game weather: Overcast, 44 °F (7 °C)
- Game attendance: 42,871
- Referee: Ben Dreith
- TV announcers (NBC): Bob Costas and Carl Eller
- Box score

Game information

**First quarter**

- STL – Neil O'Donoghue 40-yard field goal, 8:32. Cardinals 3–0. **Drive: 7 plays, 49 yards, 2:22.**
- STL – Ottis Anderson 2-yard run (Neil O'Donoghue kick), 2:58. Cardinals 10–0. **Drive: 4 plays, 55 yards, 2:56.**

**Second quarter**

- No scoring plays.

**Third quarter**

- KC – Arnold Morgado 1-yard run (Nick Lowery kick), 7:19. Cardinals 10–7. **Drive: 6 plays, 62 yards, 2:43.**
- STL – Neil O'Donoghue 43-yard field goal, 5:02. Cardinals 13–7. **Drive: 8 plays, 35 yards, 2:17.**

**Fourth quarter**

- KC – Arnold Morgado 2-yard pass Steve Fuller (Nick Lowery kick), 6:31. Chiefs 14–13. **Drive: 11 plays, 44 yards, 5:37.**
- KC – J.T. Smith 75-yard punt return (Nick Lowery kick), 5:15. Chiefs 21–13.

Top passers

- KC – Steve Fuller – 18/32, 222 yards, TD, 2 INT
- STL – Jim Hart – 14/39, 211 yards, INT

Top rushers

- KC – James Hadnot – 19 rushes, 64 yards
- STL – Ottis Anderson – 16 rushes, 107 yards, TD

Top receivers

- KC – Henry Marshall – 7 receptions, 117 yards
- STL – Theotis Brown – 1 reception, 63 yards

==== Week 13: vs. Cincinnati Bengals ====
Week 13: Cincinnati Bengals at Kansas City Chiefs – Game summary

Quarter	1	2	3	4	Total
**Bengals**	7	0	0	13	**20**
Chiefs	0	3	0	3	**6**

at Arrowhead Stadium, Kansas City, Missouri

- Date: November 30
- Game time: 1:00 p.m. CST
- Game weather: Clear, 62 °F (17 °C)
- Game attendance: 41,594
- Referee: Dick Jorgensen
- TV announcers (NBC): Jay Randolph and Mike Haffner
- Box score

Game information

**First quarter**

- CIN – Pat McInally 4-yard pass from Ken Anderson (Jim Breech kick), 3:01. Bengals 7–0. **Drive: 5 plays, 25 yards, 2:28.**

**Second quarter**

- KC – Nick Lowery 26-yard field goal, 8:17. Bengals 7–3. **Drive: 18 plays, 64 yards, 9:44.**

**Third quarter**

- No scoring plays.

**Fourth quarter**

- CIN – Dan Ross 1-yard pass from Jack Thompson (kick failed, wide left), 9:13. Bengals 13–3. **Drive: 14 plays, 62 yards, 6:35.**
- KC – Nick Lowery 40-yard field goal, 4:55. Bengals 13–6. **Drive: 14 plays, 53 yards, 4:18.**
- CIN – Pete Johnson 57-yard run (Jim Breech kick), 1:50. Bengals 20–6. **Drive: 8 plays, 93 yards, 3:05.**

Top passers

- CIN – Ken Anderson – 11/21, 87 yards, TD, 2 INT
- KC – Steve Fuller – 21/37, 210 yards, INT

Top rushers

- CIN – Pete Johnson – 17 rushes, 112 yards, TD
- KC – James Hadnot – 9 rushes, 31 yards

Top receivers

- CIN – Dan Ross – 4 receptions, 40 yards, TD
- KC – Henry Marshall – 3 receptions, 65 yards

==== Week 14: vs. Denver Broncos ====
Week 14: Denver Broncos at Kansas City Chiefs – Game summary

Quarter	1	2	3	4	Total
Broncos	0	0	7	7	**14**
**Chiefs**	0	28	0	3	**31**

at Arrowhead Stadium, Kansas City, Missouri

- Date: December 7
- Game time: 3:00 p.m. CST
- Game weather: Overcast, showers, 41 °F (5 °C)
- Game attendance: 40,237
- Referee: Fred Wyant
- TV announcers (NBC): Jay Randolph and Mike Haffner
- Box score

Game information

**First quarter**

- No scoring plays.

**Second quarter**

- KC – J. T. Smith 33-yard pass from Bill Kenney (Nick Lowery kick), 10:21. Chiefs 7–0. **Drive: 2 plays, 37 yards, 0:46.**
- KC – Arnold Morgado 1-yard run (Nick Lowery kick), 3:21. Chiefs 14–0. **Drive: 13 plays, 51 yards, 6:06.**
- KC – Thomas Howard 3-yard fumble return (Nick Lowery kick), 3:08. Chiefs 21–0.
- KC – Bubba Garcia 8-yard pass from Bill Kenney (Nick Lowery kick), 0:03. Chiefs 28–0. **Drive: 7 plays, 43 yards, 2:30.**

**Third quarter**

- DEN – Riley Odoms 22-yard pass from Craig Morton (Fred Steinfort kick), 9:19. Chiefs 28–7. **Drive: 11 plays, 78 yards, 5:41.**

**Fourth quarter**

- DEN – Haven Moses 4-yard pass from Craig Morton (Fred Steinfort kick), 11:11. Chiefs 28–14. **Drive: 12 plays, 90 yards, 5:32.**
- KC – Nick Lowery 20-yard field goal, 5:58. Chiefs 31–14. **Drive: 11 plays, 71 yards, 5:13.**

Top passers

- DEN – Craig Morton – 20/35, 263 yards, 2 TD, INT
- KC – Bill Kenney – 12/18, 142 yards, 2 TD, INT

Top rushers

- DEN – Dave Preston – 14 rushes, 52 yards
- KC – Ted McKnight – 16 rushes, 67 yards

Top receivers

- DEN – Haven Moses – 5 receptions, 69 yards, TD
- KC – J. T. Smith – 2 receptions, 47 yards, TD

==== Week 15: at Pittsburgh Steelers ====
Week 15: Kansas City Chiefs at Pittsburgh Steelers – Game summary

Quarter	1	2	3	4	Total
Chiefs	0	3	13	0	**16**
**Steelers**	7	0	0	14	**21**

at Three Rivers Stadium, Pittsburgh, Pennsylvania

- Date: December 14
- Game time: 1:00 p.m. EST
- Game weather: Partly cloudy, 31 °F (−1 °C)
- Game attendance: 50,013
- Referee: Fred Silva
- TV announcers (NBC): Marv Albert and Mike Haffner
- Box score

Game information

**First quarter**

- PIT – Lynn Swann 9-yard pass from Terry Bradshaw (Matt Bahr kick), 4:10. Steelers 7–0. **Drive: 8 plays, 80 yards, 4:12.**

**Second quarter**

- KC – Nick Lowery 36-yard field goal, 2:30. Steelers 7–3. **Drive: 4 plays, 7 yards, 1:49.**

**Third quarter**

- KC – James Hadnot 3-yard run (Nick Lowery kick), 7:54. Chiefs 10–7. **Drive: 7 plays, 85 yards, 4:42.**
- KC – Nick Lowery 22-yard field goal, 4:43. Chiefs 13–7. **Drive: 6 plays, 24 yards, 2:16.**
- KC – Nick Lowery 50-yard field goal, 2:14. Chiefs 16–7. **Drive: 4 plays, 0 yards, 1:33.**

**Fourth quarter**

- PIT – Theo Bell 13-yard pass from Terry Bradshaw (Matt Bahr kick), 11:57. Chiefs 16–14. **Drive: 10 plays, 75 yards, 5:17.**
- PIT – Rocky Bleier 11-yard run (Matt Bahr kick), 6:08. Steelers 21–16. **Drive: 8 plays, 52 yards, 3:58.**

Top passers

- KC – Bill Kenney – 8/23, 84 yards, INT
- PIT – Terry Bradshaw – 14/22, 197 yards, 2 TD, 2 INT

Top rushers

- KC – Ted McKnight – 16 rushes, 66 yards
- PIT – Franco Harris – 18 rushes, 62 yards

Top receivers

- KC – Al Dixon – 2 receptions, 38 yards
- PIT – Lynn Swann – 4 receptions, 54 yards, TD

==== Week 16: at Baltimore Colts ====
Week 16: Kansas City Chiefs at Baltimore Colts – Game summary

Quarter	1	2	3	4	Total
**Chiefs**	21	0	7	10	**38**
Colts	0	28	0	0	**28**

at Memorial Stadium, Baltimore, Maryland

- Date: December 21
- Game time: 2:00 p.m. EST
- Game weather: Sunny and cold, 24 °F (−4 °C)
- Game attendance: 16,941
- Referee: Cal Lepore
- TV announcers (NBC): Mike Adamle and Dave Rowe
- Box score

Game information

**First quarter**

- KC – James Hadnot 1-yard run (Nick Lowery kick), 10:56. Chiefs 7–0. **Drive: 6 plays, 25 yards, 2:12.**
- KC – J.T. Smith 37-yard pass from Bill Kenney (Nick Lowery kick), 9:50. Chiefs 14–0. **Drive: 1 play, 37 yards, 0:11.**
- KC – J.T. Smith 53-yard punt return (Nick Lowery kick), 2:07. Chiefs 21–0.

**Second quarter**

- BAL – Joe Washington 20-yard pass from Bert Jones (Steve Mike-Mayer kick), 13:08. Chiefs 21–7. **Drive: 11 plays, 76 yards, 3:49.**
- BAL – Roger Carr 5-yard pass from Bert Jones (Steve Mike-Mayer kick), 8:01. Chiefs 21–14. **Drive: 9 plays, 46 yards, 4:40.**
- BAL – Marvin Sims 2-yard run (Steve Mike-Mayer kick), 4:55. Tied 21–21. **Drive: 3 plays, 15 yards, 0:36.**
- BAL – Randy Burke 14-yard pass from Bert Jones (Steve Mike-Mayer kick), 0:30. Colts 28–21. **Drive: 6 plays, 42 yards, 0:56.**

**Third quarter**

- KC – Henry Marshall 23-yard pass from Bill Kenney (Nick Lowery kick), 7:02. Tied 28–28. **Drive: 9 plays, 75 yards, 4:09.**

**Fourth quarter**

- KC – Nick Lowery 39-yard field goal, 11:45. Chiefs 31–28. **Drive: 7 plays, 53 yards, 2:56.**
- KC – Henry Marshall 75-yard pass from Bill Kenney (Nick Lowery kick), 2:10. Chiefs 38–28. **Drive: 6 plays, 80 yards, 2:26.**

Top passers

- KC – Bill Kenney – 17/28, 316 yards, 3 TD
- BAL – Bert Jones – 22/39, 225 yards, 3 TD, INT

Top rushers

- KC – Ted McKnight – 11 rushes, 33 yards
- BAL – Curtis Dickey – 19 rushes, 65 yards

Top receivers

- KC – Henry Marshall – 9 receptions, 176 yards, 2 TD
- BAL – Roger Carr – 7 receptions, 70 yards, TD

=== Standings ===
AFC West
	W	L	T	PCT	DIV	CONF	PF	PA	STK
^{(1)} San Diego Chargers	11	5	0	.688	6–2	9–3	418	327	W2
^{(4)} Oakland Raiders	11	5	0	.688	6–2	9–3	364	306	W2
Kansas City Chiefs	8	8	0	.500	4–4	6–8	319	336	W1
Denver Broncos	8	8	0	.500	3–5	5–7	310	323	W1
Seattle Seahawks	4	12	0	.250	1–7	3–9	291	408	L9
