= Herb Christopher =

Herb Christopher may refer to:

- Actaea spicata, a species of flowering plant also known as Herb Christopher
- Herb Christopher (American football) (born 1954), American football player
