= Ken Thomas (American football) =

American football player (1960–2002)

No. 35
- Position: Running back

Personal information
- Born: February 11, 1960; Hanford, California, U.S.
- Died: November 13, 2002 (aged 42); Independence, Missouri, U.S.
- Listed height: 5 ft 9 in (1.75 m)
- Listed weight: 211 lb (96 kg)

Career information
- High school: Hanford
- College: San Jose State
- NFL draft: 1983: 7th round, 173rd overall pick

Career history
- Kansas City Chiefs (1983–1985)

Awards and highlights
- Second-team All-American (1981); 2× All-PCAA (1979, 1981)

Career NFL statistics
- Rushing yards: 55
- Rushing average: 3.7
- Receptions: 28
- Receiving yards: 236
- Receiving touchdowns: 1
- Stats at Pro Football Reference

Ken Thomas (February 11, 1960 — November 13, 2002) was an American professional football player who was a running back for the Kansas City Chiefs of the National Football League (NFL). He played college football for the San José State Spartans.

== Early life ==
Thomas was born and grew up in Hanford, California and attended Hanford High School, where he competed in football, track and basketball. Thomas was inducted into the school's Hall of Fame in 2010.

== College career ==
At San Jose State University (SJSU), Thomas was named All-Pacific Coast Athletic Association in 1979 and 1981, when he was also a second-team NEA All-America selection. Thomas tied the school record with 14 interceptions and holds the record for interceptions returned for touchdowns in a season (3) and for a career (5). Thomas also ran track at SJSU and was named an All-American 1981 as a member of the Spartans' 400-meter relay team that finished fifth at the NCAA championships.

== Professional career ==
Thomas was selected in the seventh round of the 1983 NFL draft by the Kansas City Chiefs. He was moved to running back in the preseason and rushed for 55 yards on 15 carries and caught 28 passes for 236 yards and one touchdown. Thomas injured his knee in a preseason game in 1984 and spent the season on injured reserve and 1985 on the physically unable to perform list before ultimately retiring.

== Personal life ==
Thomas's older brother, Jewerl Thomas, also played football at SJSU and in the NFL. Thomas died in 2002.
