= Ellis Gardner =

American football player (born 1961)

No. 75, 65
- Positions: Tackle, guard

Personal information
- Born: September 16, 1961 (age 65); Chattanooga, Tennessee, U.S.
- Listed height: 6 ft 5 in (1.96 m)
- Listed weight: 257 lb (117 kg)

Career information
- High school: The McCallie School
- College: Georgia Tech
- NFL draft: 1983: 6th round, 146th overall pick

Career history
- Kansas City Chiefs (1983); Houston Oilers (1984)*; Indianapolis Colts (1984)
- * Offseason or practice squad member only

Career NFL statistics
- Games played: 17
- Stats at Pro Football Reference

Ellis Peniston Gardner (born September 16, 1961) is an American former professional football player who was an offensive lineman in the National Football League (NFL). He played college football for the Georgia Tech Yellow Jackets, lettering also in wrestling and track while achieving a 3.6 GPA in Electrical Engineering. He was selected by the Kansas City Chiefs in the sixth round of the 1983 NFL draft. He played for the Chiefs and Indianapolis Colts.
