= Al Steinfeld =

American football player (born 1958)

No. 69, 63, 69
- Positions: Guard, center, tackle

Personal information
- Born: October 28, 1958 (age 68); Brooklyn, New York City, New York
- Listed height: 6 ft 5 in (1.96 m)
- Listed weight: 256 lb (116 kg)

Career information
- High school: South Shore (NY)
- College: C.W. Post

Career history
- Kansas City Chiefs (1982); New York Giants (1983); Houston Oilers (1983)
- Stats at Pro Football Reference

Al Steinfeld (born October 28, 1958) is an American former football guard, center and tackle. He played for the Kansas City Chiefs in 1982 and for the New York Giants and Houston Oilers in 1983.
