= Ron Wetzel (American football) =

American football player (born 1960)

No. 87
- Position: Tight end

Personal information
- Born: November 10, 1960 (age 65); Pittsburgh, Pennsylvania, U.S.
- Listed height: 6 ft 5 in (1.96 m)
- Listed weight: 242 lb (110 kg)

Career information
- High school: South Hills
- College: Arizona State
- NFL draft: 1983: 4th round, 92nd overall pick

Career history
- Kansas City Chiefs (1983); Arizona Outlaws (1985)
- Stats at Pro Football Reference

Ronald Joseph Wetzel (born November 10, 1960) is an American former professional football player who was a tight end for one season in the National Football League (NFL) for Kansas City Chiefs and one in the United States Football League (USFL) for the Arizona Outlaws. He played college football for the Arizona State Sun Devils and was a fourth-round (92nd overall) pick in the 1983 NFL draft.
