= Steve Fuller (American football) =

American football player (born 1957)

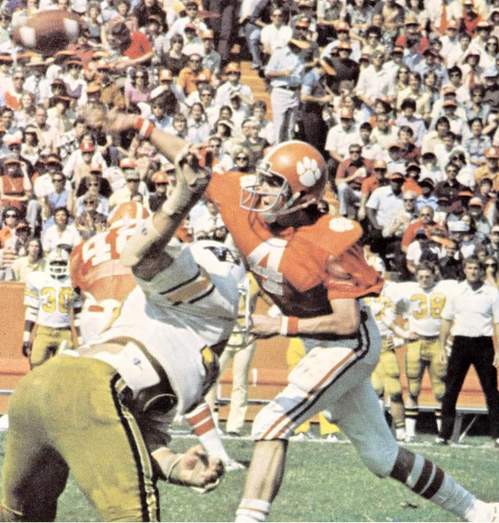
- Fuller with the Clemson Tigers in 1975

No. 4
- Position: Quarterback

Personal information
- Born: January 5, 1957 (age 69); Enid, Oklahoma, U.S.
- Listed height: 6 ft 4 in (1.93 m)
- Listed weight: 198 lb (90 kg)

Career information
- High school: Spartanburg (Spartanburg, South Carolina)
- College: Clemson (1975–1978)
- NFL draft: 1979: 1st round, 23rd overall pick

Career history
- Kansas City Chiefs (1979–1982); Los Angeles Rams (1983); Chicago Bears (1984–1987); San Diego Chargers (1988)

Awards and highlights
- Super Bowl champion (XX); Third-team All-American (1978); 2× ACC Player of the Year (1977, 1978); 2× First-team All-ACC (1977, 1978); Clemson Tigers No. 4 retired

Career NFL statistics
- Passing attempts: 1,066
- Passing completions: 605
- Completion percentage: 56.8%
- TD–INT: 28–41
- Passing yards: 7,156
- Passer rating: 70.1
- Rushing yards: 908
- Rushing touchdowns: 11
- Stats at Pro Football Reference

Stephen Ray Fuller (born January 5, 1957) is an American former professional football quarterback who played in the National Football League (NFL) for 10 seasons. He played college football for the Clemson Tigers, earning third-team All-American honors and twice winning ACC Player of the Year between 1977 and 1978. He was selected by the Kansas City Chiefs in the first round of the 1979 NFL draft.

Fuller played his first four seasons with the Chiefs, serving as the starter in his first two. He spent the remainder of his career as a backup with the Los Angeles Rams, Chicago Bears, and San Diego Chargers. During his four seasons with the Bears, he was a member of the team that won the franchise's first Super Bowl title in Super Bowl XX.

== Early life ==
Fuller was born in Enid, Oklahoma and graduated from Spartanburg High School in Spartanburg, South Carolina.

== College career ==
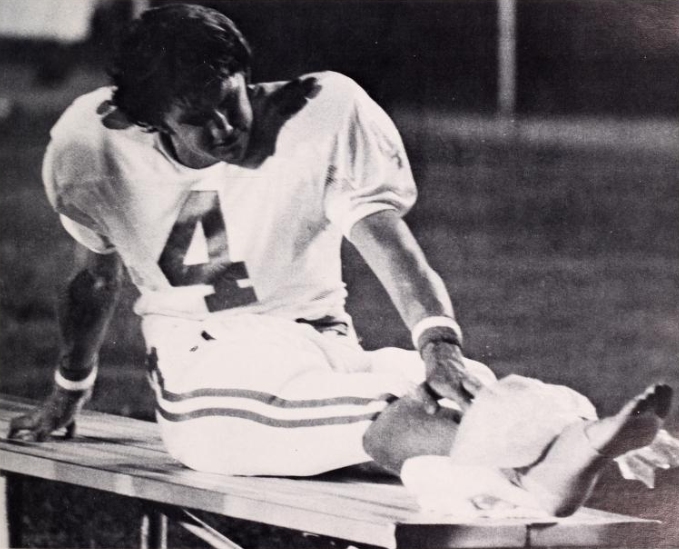
Fuller in 1976

Fuller played college football at Clemson University in Clemson, South Carolina from 1975 to 1978. He was a member of the Sigma Alpha Epsilon fraternity, Fuller was a football and academic All-America at Clemson University.

In 1975, Fuller was 22-of-46 for 354 yards with two touchdowns and three interceptions. In addition, he had 47 carries for 148 yards as Clemson finished with a 2–9 record.

In 1976, Fuller was 58-of-116 for 835 yards with five touchdowns and six interceptions. In addition, he had 157 carries for 503 yards with six touchdowns as Clemson finished with a 3–6–2 record.

In 1977, Fuller was 106-of-205 for 1,655 yards with eight touchdowns and eight interceptions. In addition, he had 178 carries for 437 yards with six touchdowns as Clemson finished with an 8–3–1 record.

In 1978, Fuller was 101-of-187 for 1,515 yards with seven touchdowns and four interceptions. In addition, he had 153 carries for 649 yards and ten touchdowns as Clemson finished with an 11–1 record. Fuller helped lead the Tigers to their first 11-win season since 1948.

== Professional career ==
Fuller was selected by the Kansas City Chiefs in the first round with the 23rd overall pick in the 1979 NFL draft. He played in the National Football League for seven years, most notably with the Chicago Bears as their backup quarterback from 1984 to 1986, including the Super Bowl XX championship season in 1985.

In the 1979 season, he started in 12 games. He had 1,484 yards, six touchdowns, and 14 interceptions to go with 50 carries for 264 yards and one rushing touchdown as the Chiefs went 7–9 and missed the playoffs. In the 1980 season, he started in 13 games. He had 2,250 yards, 10 touchdowns, and 12 interceptions to with 60 carries for 274 yards and four touchdowns as the Chiefs went 8–8 and missed the playoffs. In the 1981 season, he appeared in 13 games and made three starts. He passed for 934 yards, three touchdowns, and four interceptions to go with 19 carries for 118 rushing yards. In the 1982 season, he made three starts, passing for 665 yards, three touchdowns and two interceptions. After not throwing a single pass during the entire 1983 NFL season, Fuller came in for the Chicago Bears in Week 10 of the 1984 NFL season against the Los Angeles Raiders after an injury to starting quarterback Jim McMahon halfway through the game. McMahon missed the rest of the 1984 season and Fuller became the Bears starter, all the way to the 1984 NFC Championship game against the eventual Super Bowl champion San Francisco 49ers. In the 1985 season, he started in five games in mainly a backup role. He had five rushing touchdowns on the year. In the 1986 season, which would be his last, he made two starts but played sparingly.

Fuller was awarded a gold record and a platinum video award for the 1985 "Super Bowl Shuffle", for which he was the sixth of the ten solo singers. In 2010, during Super Bowl XLIV, Fuller joined other members of the 1985 Chicago Bears in recreating the Super Bowl Shuffle in a Boost Mobile commercial.

Fuller was named by Sports Illustrated as one of the top fifteen backup quarterbacks of all time, based on his 1985 season with the Chicago Bears.

== Career statistics ==
=== NFL ===
Legend
| | Won the Super Bowl |
| | Led the league |
| **Bold** | Career high |

==== Regular season ====
| Year | Team | Games | | | Passing | | | | | | | | | Rushing | | | | | Sacks | |
| Year | Team | GP | GS | Record | Cmp | Att | Pct | Yds | Y/A | Lng | TD | Int | Rtg | Att | Yds | Avg | Lng | TD | Sck | Yds |
|---|---|---|---|---|---|---|---|---|---|---|---|---|---|---|---|---|---|---|---|---|
| 1979 | KAN | **16** | 12 | **6–6** | 146 | 270 | 54.1 | 1,484 | 5.5 | 40 | 6 | **14** | 55.8 | 50 | 264 | 5.3 | **49** | 1 | 37 | 244 |
| 1980 | KAN | 14 | **13** | **6–7** | **193** | **320** | 60.3 | **2,250** | 7.0 | **77** | **10** | 12 | 76.4 | **60** | **274** | 4.6 | 38 | 4 | **49** | **348** |
| 1981 | KAN | 13 | 3 | 1–2 | 77 | 134 | 57.5 | 934 | 7.0 | 53 | 3 | 4 | 74.0 | 19 | 118 | **6.2** | 27 | 0 | 17 | 117 |
| 1982 | KAN | 9 | 3 | 0–3 | 49 | 93 | 52.7 | 665 | 7.2 | 51 | 3 | 2 | 77.6 | 10 | 56 | 5.6 | 12 | 0 | 17 | 143 |
| 1984 | CHI | 6 | 4 | 2–2 | 53 | 78 | **67.9** | 595 | **7.6** | 31 | 3 | 0 | **103.3** | 15 | 89 | 5.9 | 26 | 1 | 7 | 41 |
| 1985 | CHI | **16** | 5 | 4–1 | 53 | 107 | 49.5 | 777 | 7.3 | 69 | 1 | 5 | 57.3 | 24 | 77 | 3.2 | 13 | **5** | 17 | 102 |
| 1986 | CHI | **16** | 2 | 0–2 | 34 | 64 | 53.1 | 451 | 7.0 | 50 | 2 | 4 | 60.1 | 8 | 30 | 3.8 | 10 | 0 | 8 | 53 |
| Career | | 90 | 42 | 19–23 | 605 | 1,066 | 56.8 | 7,156 | 6.7 | 77 | 28 | 41 | 70.1 | 186 | 908 | 4.9 | 49 | 11 | 152 | 1,048 |

==== Playoffs ====
| Year | Team | Games | | | Passing | | | | | | | | | Rushing | | | | | Sacks | |
| Year | Team | GP | GS | Record | Cmp | Att | Pct | Yds | Y/A | Lng | TD | Int | Rtg | Att | Yds | Avg | Lng | TD | Sck | Yds |
|---|---|---|---|---|---|---|---|---|---|---|---|---|---|---|---|---|---|---|---|---|
| 1984 | CHI | 2 | **2** | **1–1** | **22** | **37** | **59.5** | **298** | **8.1** | **75** | **2** | **1** | **91.9** | **8** | **44** | **5.5** | **23** | 0 | **13** | **84** |
| 1985 | CHI | **3** | 0 | 0–0 | 0 | 4 | 0.0 | 0 | 0.0 | 0 | 0 | 0 | 39.6 | 1 | 1 | 1.0 | 1 | 0 | 1 | 11 |
| 1986 | CHI | 1 | 0 | 0–0 | 0 | 0 | 0.0 | 0 | 0.0 | 0 | 0 | 0 | 0.0 | 0 | 0 | 0.0 | 0 | 0 | 0 | 0 |
| Career | | 6 | 2 | 1–1 | 22 | 41 | 53.7 | 298 | 7.3 | 75 | 2 | 1 | 83.2 | 9 | 45 | 5.0 | 23 | 0 | 14 | 95 |

=== College ===
Legend
| | Led the ACC |
| **Bold** | Career high |

| Season | Team | GP | Passing | | | | | | | | Rushing | | |
| Season | Team | GP | Cmp | Att | Pct | Yds | TD | Int | Rtg | Att | Yds | Avg | TD |
|---|---|---|---|---|---|---|---|---|---|---|---|---|---|
| 1975 | Clemson | 11 | 22 | 46 | 47.8 | 354 | 2 | 3 | 113.8 | 47 | 148 | 3.1 | 0 |
| 1976 | Clemson | 11 | 58 | 116 | 50.0 | 835 | 5 | **6** | 114.3 | 157 | 503 | 3.2 | 6 |
| 1977 | Clemson | 11 | 96 | 182 | 52.7 | 1,497 | **8** | 4 | **131.9** | **165** | 403 | 2.4 | 6 |
| 1978 | Clemson | **12** | **101** | **187** | **54.0** | **1,515** | 7 | 4 | 130.1 | 153 | **649** | **4.2** | **10** |
| Career | | 45 | 277 | 531 | 52.2 | 4,201 | 22 | 17 | 125.9 | 522 | 1,703 | 3.3 | 22 |

* Includes bowl games.

== Personal life ==
Fuller and his wife, Anna, have two children. The couple live in South Carolina where Fuller was a high school football coach at Hilton Head Prep School. Fuller currently works as offensive coordinator for the Hilton Head Prep School Varsity football team.
