= Bubba Garcia =

American football player (born 1957)

No. 80
- Position: Wide receiver

Personal information
- Born: October 18, 1957 (age 69); New Braunfels, Texas, U.S.
- Listed height: 5 ft 11 in (1.80 m)
- Listed weight: 185 lb (84 kg)

Career information
- High school: New Braunfels
- College: Texas-El Paso (1976–1979)
- NFL draft: 1980: 6th round, 147th overall pick

Career history
- Kansas City Chiefs (1980–1981); Denver Gold (1983)

Career NFL statistics
- Receptions: 3
- Receiving yards: 27
- Touchdowns: 1
- Stats at Pro Football Reference

Jesse Clarence "Bubba" Garcia (born October 18, 1957) is an American former professional football player who was a wide receiver for two seasons with the Kansas City Chiefs of the National Football League (NFL). He played college football for the UTEP Miners.

== Early life ==
Jesse Clarence Garcia was born on October 18, 1957, in New Braunfels, Texas. He attended New Braunfels High School in New Braunfels.

== College career ==
Garcia was a four-year letterman for the UTEP Miners of the University of Texas at El Paso from 1976 to 1979. He caught 53 passes for 826 yards and nine touchdowns in 1977 while also returning 13 punts for 58 yards. His 53 catches led the Western Athletic Conference that year. In 1978, he totaled 40 receptions for 451 yards and two touchdowns, 13 punt returns for 77 yards, and two kick returns for 20 yards. As a senior in 1979, he caught seven passes for 98 yards and returned 12 punts for 58 yards.

== Professional career ==
Garcia was selected by the Kansas City Chiefs in the sixth round, with the 147th overall pick, of the 1980 NFL draft. He officially signed with the team on June 4. He was released on July 18 but later re-signed on November 21, 1980. Garcia then played in five games for the Chiefs during the 1980 season, catching three passes for 27 yards and one touchdown. He played in one game during the 1981 season without recording any statistics before being released in 1981.

Garcia was also a member of the Denver Gold of the United States Football League in 1983.
