= Robert Blakley =

American football player (born 1959)

No. 83
- Position: Wide receiver

Personal information
- Born: September 20, 1959 (age 67); St. Paul, Minnesota, U.S.
- Listed height: 6 ft 0 in (1.83 m)
- Listed weight: 190 lb (86 kg)

Career information
- High school: Central (Duluth, Minnesota)
- College: North Dakota State
- NFL draft: 1982: undrafted

Career history
- Kansas City Chiefs (1982); St. Louis Cardinals (1983)*; Miami Dolphins (1984)*
- * Offseason or practice squad member only

Robert Ervin Blakley (born September 20, 1959) is an American former professional football wide receiver who played for the Kansas City Chiefs of the National Football League (NFL). He played college football for the North Dakota State Bison.
