= Louis Haynes =

American football player (1960–2002)

No. 56
- Position: Linebacker

Personal information
- Born: January 17, 1960; New Orleans, Louisiana, U.S.
- Died: December 22, 2002 (aged 42); New Orleans, Louisiana, U.S.
- Listed height: 6 ft 0 in (1.83 m)
- Listed weight: 227 lb (103 kg)

Career information
- High school: New Orleans (LA) O. Perry Walker
- College: Bishop; North Texas
- NFL draft: 1982: 4th round, 100th overall pick

Career history
- Kansas City Chiefs (1982–1983); Washington Redskins (1985)*
- * Offseason or practice squad member only

Career NFL statistics
- Fumble recoveries: 2
- Stats at Pro Football Reference

Louis Haynes (January 17, 1960 – December 22, 2002) was an American professional football linebacker. He played for the Kansas City Chiefs from 1982 to 1983.

He died on December 22, 2002, in New Orleans, Louisiana at age 42.
