= James Walker (linebacker) =

American football player (born 1958)

No. 54, 64, 75
- Position: Linebacker

Personal information
- Born: December 9, 1958 (age 67); Muskogee, Oklahoma, U.S.
- Listed height: 6 ft 1 in (1.85 m)
- Listed weight: 250 lb (113 kg)

Career information
- High school: Wichita East (Wichita, Kansas)
- College: Kansas State
- NFL draft: 1981: undrafted

Career history
- New Orleans Saints (1982)*; Kansas City Chiefs (1982–1983); Calgary Stampeders (1985–1986); Saskatchewan Roughriders (1986)
- * Offseason or practice squad member only
- Stats at Pro Football Reference

James Charles Walker (born December 9, 1958) is an American former professional football linebacker who played for the Kansas City Chiefs of the National Football League (NFL). He played college football for the Kansas State Wildcats. He was also a defensive lineman in the Canadian Football League.
