= Jewerl Thomas =

American football player (born 1957)

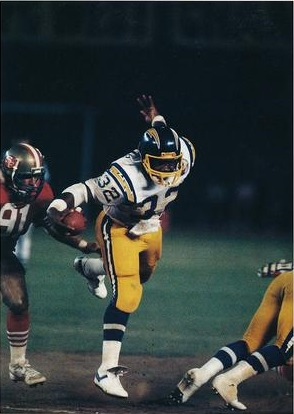
- Thomas in 1984

No. 33, 31, 32
- Position: Running back

Personal information
- Born: September 10, 1957 (age 69); Hanford, California, U.S.
- Listed height: 5 ft 10 in (1.78 m)
- Listed weight: 230 lb (104 kg)

Career information
- College: UCLA; San Jose State
- NFL draft: 1980: 3rd round, 58th overall pick

Career history
- Los Angeles Rams (1980–1982); Kansas City Chiefs (1983); San Diego Chargers (1984)

Career NFL statistics
- Rushing yards: 783
- Rushing average: 4.5
- Rushing touchdowns: 4
- Stats at Pro Football Reference

Jewerl Thomas (born September 10, 1957) is an American former professional football player who was a running back for five seasons for the Los Angeles Rams, Kansas City Chiefs, and San Diego Chargers.
