= Dave Klug =

American football player (born 1958)

No. 55
- Position: Linebacker

Personal information
- Born: May 17, 1958 (age 68); Litchfield, Minnesota, U.S.
- Listed height: 6 ft 4 in (1.93 m)
- Listed weight: 230 lb (104 kg)

Career information
- High school: Litchfield
- College: Concordia (Moorhead)
- NFL draft: 1980: 4th round, 94th overall pick

Career history
- Kansas City Chiefs (1980–1983); Houston Oilers (1985)*
- * Offseason or practice squad member only
- Stats at Pro Football Reference

David John Klug (born May 17, 1958) is an American former professional football player who was a linebacker for the Kansas City Chiefs of the National Football League (NFL). He played college football for the Concordia Cobbers.
