= Herb Christopher (American football) =

American football player (born 1954)

No. 41
- Position: Safety

Personal information
- Born: April 7, 1954 (age 72); Thomasville, Georgia, U.S.
- Listed height: 5 ft 10 in (1.78 m)
- Listed weight: 195 lb (88 kg)

Career information
- College: Morris Brown
- NFL draft: 1978: undrafted

Career history
- Denver Broncos (1978)*; Kansas City Chiefs (1979–1982)
- * Offseason or practice squad member only

Career NFL statistics
- Interceptions: 4
- Fumble recoveries: 1
- Stats at Pro Football Reference

Herbert Christopher (born April 7, 1954) is an American former professional football player who was a safety for four seasons with the Kansas City Chiefs of the National Football League (NFL). He played college football for the Morris Brown Wolverines.

== Early life ==
Christopher was born on April 7, 1954, in Thomasville, Georgia. He did not receive any scholarships to play college football, instead walking on at Morris Brown College two years after finishing high school.

== Professional career ==
After going unselected in the 1978 NFL draft, Christopher was signed by the Denver Broncos as an undrafted free agent. However, he did not make the final roster, as he was cut in August. Christopher signed with the Kansas City Chiefs in 1979, but was again released before the start of the season. However, he re-signed with the team that October following a knee injury to starting strong safety Jerry Reese. Christopher earned the starting strong safety spot after three games. He played in nine games as a rookie and recorded two interceptions. Christopher started all 16 games in 1980, recording 78 tackles and two interceptions. He was moved out of the starting lineup in favor of Lloyd Burruss during the 1981 season. Christopher was released in August 1983.
