= 1980 San Diego Chargers season =

1980 NFL team season

- Owner: Gene Klein
- General manager: Johnny Sanders
- Head coach: Don Coryell
- Offensive coordinator: Joe Gibbs
- Defensive coordinator: Jackie Simpson
- Home stadium: San Diego Stadium

Results
- Record: 11–5
- Division place: 1st AFC West
- Playoffs: Won Divisional Playoffs (vs. Bills) 20–14; Lost AFC Championship (vs. Raiders) 27–34
- All-Pros: 8: K Rolf Benirschke (2nd team); DE Fred Dean (1st team); QB Dan Fouts (2nd team); WR John Jefferson (1st team); DT Gary Johnson (1st team); WR Charlie Joiner (1st team); DT Louie Kelcher (2nd team); TE Kellen Winslow (1st team)
- Pro Bowlers: 8: DE Fred Dean; QB Dan Fouts; WR John Jefferson; DT Gary Johnson; WR Charlie Joiner; DT Louie Kelcher; G Doug Wilkerson; TE Kellen Winslow

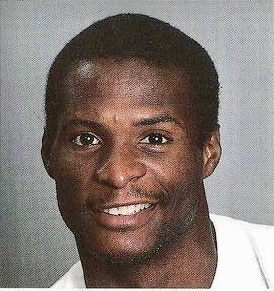
Chargers wide receiver John Jefferson led the NFL in both receiving yards (1,340) and receiving touchdowns (13) in 1980.

The 1980 San Diego Chargers season was the franchise's 11th season in the National Football League (NFL), and its 21st overall. The team failed to improve on their 12–4 record in 1979 and finished 11–5, though they won the AFC West and gained the top seed in the AFC playoffs for the second consecutive season. Their season ended in the AFC Championship Game when they lost to their divisional rivals and the eventual Super Bowl champions, the Oakland Raiders.

San Diego's Air Coryell offense led the league and set new standards in the passing game. Quarterback Dan Fouts passed for 4,715 yards, surpassing his own NFL record. He also set new single-season records for attempts, completions and 300-yard games. Tight end Kellen Winslow and wide receivers John Jefferson and Charlie Joiner each had over 1,000 yards receiving, becoming the first trio of teammates to do so in the same season. The running game was less impactful, despite the mid-season acquisition of running back Chuck Muncie. On defense, the Chargers led the league with 60 sacks. The majority of these came from their starting defensive linemen, Fred Dean, Louie Kelcher, Leroy Jones and Gary "Big Hands" Johnson, known collectively as the “Bruise Brothers”.

In the divisional playoffs, San Diego trailed the Buffalo Bills 14–3 at halftime, but scored 17 unanswered points in the second half to win 20–14. Backup wide receiver Ron Smith scored the winning touchdown in the final minutes. The Chargers were then stopped a game short of the Super Bowl by the Raiders, who took a 28–7 lead in the 2nd quarter. The Chargers again ran off 17 unanswered points, but they couldn't complete the comeback and were defeated 34–27.

== Offseason ==
=== Departures and arrivals ===
San Diego traded a future 2nd-round draft pick to the Los Angeles Rams in exchange for fullback John Cappelletti. A 1974 1st-round pick, Cappelletti had rushed for 15 touchdowns and over 2,000 yards in his five years with the Rams; Coryell praised his strength and blocking ability. Cappelletti rushed for over 100 yards in his first game as a Charger, though he was used primarily as a blocker during his time in San Diego (1980–83). San Diego traded their own 1st-round pick from 1974, No. 2 overall selection Bo Matthews, some months later. Also a fullback, Matthews was unlikely to see much playing time after Cappalletti's signing, and walked out of training camp to try and force a trade, which the Chargers granted him. Matthews had averaged under 250 yards per season over his six years in San Diego. Others departures included Lydell Mitchell, a former Pro Bowl running back whose production had decreased as San Diego shifted to a pass-oriented offense, and tight end Bob Klein who was coming off the two most productive pass-catching seasons of his eleven-year career, but who retired after contract negotiations with Chargers owner Gene Klein broke down.

On defense, San Diego traded linebacker Don Goode to the Cleveland Browns for a future draft pick. Goode, another Chargers 1st-round pick from 1974, had started 62 games in six seasons, but only a single one in 1979. The Chargers also switched punters, releasing Jeff West, who had ranked 28th in the league in 1979. After trying six other candidates for the position, they signed Rick Partridge from the New Orleans Saints. His average in 1979 had been 40.9 yards per kick, compared to 36.5 for West.

San Diego also made a significant signing after the season had begun, when they traded their 2nd-round draft pick in 1981 for running back Chuck Muncie. Muncie, the third overall pick in the 1976 draft, was coming off his best season with the New Orleans Saints, rushing for 1,198 yards at 5.0 yards per carry and being voted to his first Pro Bowl. He had not started the season well for the Saints, who were 0–4 when the trade took place, with head coach Dick Nolan criticizing his work ethic and commitment to the team. Coryell was unconcerned by Muncie's troubles, describing him as "one of the finest running backs in the game", who would benefit from a fresh start. He contributed 659 rushing yards for the Chargers in 1980 and would make two Pro Bowls during his five seasons in San Diego.

=== NFL draft ===
San Diego had no picks in the first three rounds, due to previous trades for Willie Buchanon and Bob Klein, as well as for the right to sign head coach Don Coryell.

Despite having four quarterbacks on their roster already, San Diego added another in the 4th round when they selected Ed Luther from San Jose State. Coryell described Luther as the Chargers' 15th-most desirable player in the draft, given their pass-oriented offense. Luther would spend most of his career backing up Dan Fouts, attempting only 22 passes in his first two seasons before going 2–7 as a starter while Fouts missed time with injuries in 1983 and 1984. A second 4th-round pick, safety Bob Gregor, missed the 1980 season through injury before going on to start sixteen games in four seasons. Only two others from the Chargers' draft class played in the NFL; running back LaRue Harrington had four carries in his career, while Chuck Loewen played in 47 games on their offensive line over the next five years, though he only started 3 of them.

1980 San Diego Chargers draft
Round	Pick	Player	Position	College	Notes
4	101	Ed Luther	Quarterback	San Jose State	
4	108	Bob Gregor	Defensive back	Washington State	
6	151	LaRue Harrington	Running back	Norfolk State	
6	163	Wayne Hamilton	Linebacker	Alabama	
7	175	Chuck Loewen	Tackle	South Dakota State	
7	191	Stuart Dodds	Punter	Montana State	
8	219	Curtis Sirmones	Running back	North Alabama	
9	247	Steve Whitman	Running back	Alabama	
11	303	John Singleton	Defensive end	UTEP	
12	331	Harry Price	Wide receiver	McNeese State	
Made roster

== Personnel ==
=== Staff ===
1980 San Diego Chargers staff
Front office: Owner – Gene Klein; General manager – Johnny Sanders; Head coaches: Head coach – Don Coryell; Offensive coaches: Offensive coordinator – Joe Gibbs; Offensive line – Dave Levy; Wide receivers – Ernie Zampese; Backfield – Earnel Durden	Defensive coaches: Defensive coordinator – Jackie Simpson; Defensive line – Jerry Smith; Defensive backs – Larrye Weaver; Special teams coaches: Special teams coach – Wayne Sevier

=== Roster ===
1980 San Diego Chargers roster
Quarterbacks (QB): 14 Dan Fouts; 12 James Harris; 11 Ed Luther; Running backs (RB): 37 Hank Bauer; 46 Chuck Muncie; 41 Booker Russell; 22 Mike Thomas; 40 Clarence Williams; Wide receivers (WR): 86 John Floyd; 83 John Jefferson; 18 Charlie Joiner; 84 Ron Smith; Tight ends (TE): 88 Greg McCrary; 80 Kellen Winslow	Offensive linemen (OL): 60 Dan Audick T; 64 Chuck Loewen G/T; 62 Don Macek C; 53 Ralph Perretta C/G; 56 Bob Rush C; 66 Billy Shields T; 67 Ed White G; 63 Doug Wilkerson G; Defensive linemen (DL): 71 Fred Dean DE; 73 Charles DeJurnett DE/DT; 79 Gary Johnson DT; 68 Leroy Jones DE; 74 Louie Kelcher DT; 69 John Lee DE; 99 Wilbur Young DE/DT	Linebackers (LB): 55 Bob Horn MLB; 54 Jim Laslavic OLB; 51 Woodrow Lowe OLB; 58 Carl McGee OLB; 52 Ray Preston OLB; 59 Cliff Thrift MLB; Defensive backs (DB): 28 Willie Buchanon CB; 48 Jerome Dove CB; 47 Frank Duncan FS; 27 Glen Edwards FS; 42 Mike Fuller SS; 26 Bernard Jackson SS; 32 Scott Perry CB; 29 Mike Williams CB; Special teams (ST): 6 Rolf Benirschke K; 17 Rick Partridge P	Reserve: 82 Billy Brooks WR (IR); 87 Larry Burton WR (Ret.); 25 John Cappelletti RB (IR); 43 Bob Gregor FS (IR); 34 LaRue Harrington RB (IR); 65 Brad Hendrix G/T (IR); 57 Linden King LB (IR); -- Jim Nicholson T (IR); 44 Pete Shaw SS (IR); 45 Hal Stringert CB/S (IR); 70 Russ Washington T (IR); 35 Steve Whitman RB (IR); 16 Mike Wood K (IR); Rookies in italics

== Preseason ==
San Diego began their preseason in the annual Pro Football Hall of Fame Game in Canton, Ohio. They faced the Green Bay Packers in an electrical storm, with wind, rain and lightning. Neither team were able to score before the game was called with 5:29 remaining in the fourth quarter for player safety, although the Chargers had been poised to attempt a field goal with the ball at the Green Bay 25. San Diego's starters played little in a 27–17 loss in Minnesota; Clarence Williams scored an early 50-yard touchdown run, and Luther led a late 91-yard touchdown drive, capped with a 20-yard pass to John Floyd.

Starting quarterback Fouts played the entire first half against the San Francisco 49ers, passing for 177 yards. Most of these went to John Jefferson, who had 8 catches for 122 yards and a touchdown. Luther threw for 124 yards and a touchdown in the second half, but his pass from the San Francisco 40 was intercepted in the end zone as time expired and the Chargers lost 17–14. The following week, the Chargers played most of their defensive starters into the second half, sacking Atlanta's quarterbacks eight times. Touchdowns from Cappelletti and Artie Owens gave them their only win of the preseason. San Diego concluded their preseason with a 34–17 loss to the Rams. Williams and Cappelletti scored the Charger touchdowns, while Rolf Benirschke kicked a 55-yard field goal.

Week	Date	Opponent	Result	Record	Venue	Attendance
HOF	August 2	vs. Green Bay Packers	T 0–0 (Note: The game was called with 5:29 remaining in the fourth quarter due to severe lightning.)	0–0–1	Fawcett Stadium (Canton, Ohio)	19,972
1	August 9	at Minnesota Vikings	L 17–27	0–1–1	Metropolitan Stadium	45,179
2	August 16	San Francisco 49ers	L 14–17	0–2–1	San Diego Stadium	48,846
3	August 23	Atlanta Falcons	W 17–9	1–2–1	San Diego Stadium	47,184
4	August 30	at Los Angeles Rams	L 17–34	1–3–1	Anaheim Stadium	61,550

== Regular season ==
=== Overview ===
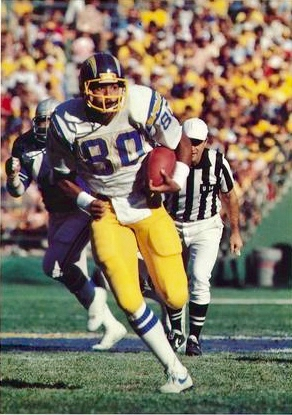
Second-year tight end Kellen Winslow led the league in receptions with 89.

San Diego repeated as AFC West champions. They started out 4–0, with wins over each of their divisional opponents, three of those on the road. They then lost four games out of six, but rebounded to win five of their final six and finish 11–5, beating the Oakland Raiders for the divisional title on tiebreakers.

The Chargers finished at the top in the league in total offensive yardage and total passing yardage, while coming fourth in scoring. Fouts broke his own record with 4,715 yards passing, and threw 30 touchdowns. His average of 294.7 yards per game also broke Joe Namath's record, and he threw for 583 more yards than his nearest rival, Cleveland's Brian Sipe. His marks for attempts (589), completions (348) and 300-yard games (8) were also NFL records. Second-year tight end Kellen Winslow had a breakout year; he, together with established wide receivers Jefferson and Charlie Joiner, dominated the NFL's receiving stats. Jefferson had 1,340 yards, Winslow 1,290 and Joiner 1,132 – they ranked 1st, 2nd and 4th in the league, and were the first trio of teammates to post 1,000 receiving yards in the same season. Winslow was the league leader in receptions (89); Jefferson was top in receiving touchdowns (13). The running game was less successful, ranking 16th out of 28 teams for yardage, but was bolstered when Muncie was acquired in a trade after four games. He averaged 4.9 yards per carry, and led the team with 659 yards. Six different players contributed to San Diego's total of 18 rushing touchdowns (joint-eighth in the NFL); Cappelletti's total of 5 led the team. The Charger offense struggled with turnovers; they threw 26 interceptions, lost 22 fumbles and led the league with 48 total giveaways, including 7 in three separate games.

While San Diego ranked only 18th in the NFL for points conceded, the defensive unit finished sixth in total yards and led the league with 60 sacks. Leading the team was Gary "Big Hands" Johnson with 17 1/2, an unofficial (Note: The NFL did not keep sack statistics officially until 1982. Members of the Professional Football Researchers Association have largely reconstructed sack data from 1960 onwards based on official gamebooks, but the NFL does not acknowledge pre-1982 sack numbers.) club record as of 2023, and the joint-most in the league. Johnson and fellow lineman Louie Kelcher and Fred Dean were all named starters in that season's Pro Bowl, a rarity for three defensive lineman from the same team. The Chargers' defensive line, which also featured Leroy Jones (second on the team with 12 sacks), was nicknamed the “Bruise Brothers”, coined from a popular act at the time, The Blues Brothers. Glen Edwards led the team with 5 of their 20 interceptions. Kicker Benirschke returned from his illness of the previous season but had the lowest field goal conversion percentage of his career to that point, making 24 of 36 and finishing joint-11th in the NFL with 67%. The newly signed Partridge ranked only 23rd among punters with 39.1 yards per kick.

=== Schedule ===
Week	Date	Opponent	Result	Record	Venue	Attendance	Recap
1	September 7	at **Seattle Seahawks**	**W** 34–13	1–0	Kingdome	62,042	Recap
2	September 14	**Oakland Raiders**	**W** 30–24 (OT)	2–0	San Diego Stadium	51,943	Recap
3	September 21	at **Denver Broncos**	**W** 30–13	3–0	Mile High Stadium	74,970	Recap
4	September 28	at **Kansas City Chiefs**	**W** 24–7	4–0	Arrowhead Stadium	45,161	Recap
5	October 5	Buffalo Bills	**L** 24–26	4–1	San Diego Stadium	51,982	Recap
6	October 12	at **Oakland Raiders**	**L** 24–38	4–2	Oakland–Alameda County Coliseum	44,826	Recap
7	October 19	New York Giants	**W** 44–7	5–2	San Diego Stadium	50,397	Recap
8	October 26	at Dallas Cowboys	**L** 31–42	5–3	Texas Stadium	60,639	Recap
9	November 2	at Cincinnati Bengals	**W** 31–14	6–3	Riverfront Stadium	46,406	Recap
10	November 9	**Denver Broncos**	**L** 13–20	6–4	San Diego Stadium	51,435	Recap
11	November 16	**Kansas City Chiefs**	**W** 20–7	7–4	San Diego Stadium	50,248	Recap
12	November 20	at Miami Dolphins	**W** 27–24 (OT)	8–4	Miami Orange Bowl	63,013	Recap
13	November 30	Philadelphia Eagles	**W** 22–21	9–4	San Diego Stadium	51,567	Recap
14	December 7	at Washington Redskins	**L** 17–40	9–5	RFK Stadium	48,556	Recap
15	December 13	**Seattle Seahawks**	**W** 21–14	10–5	San Diego Stadium	49,980	Recap
16	December 22	Pittsburgh Steelers	**W** 26–17	11–5	San Diego Stadium	51,785	Recap
Note: Intra-division opponents are in **bold** text.

=== Game summaries ===
All game reports except Weeks 7, 9 and 14 use the Pro Football Researchers' gamebook archive as a source.

==== Week 1: at Seattle Seahawks ====
Week One: San Diego Chargers at Seattle Seahawks – Game summary

Quarter	1	2	3	4	Total
**Chargers**	3	21	7	3	**34**
Seahawks	3	0	3	7	**13**

at Kingdome, Seattle, Washington

- Date: September 7
- Game time: 1:00 p.m. PDT
- Game weather: Dome
- Game attendance: 62,042
- Referee: Jerry Seeman
- TV announcers (NBC): Merle Harmon and Carl Eller
- Box score

Game information

**First quarter**

- SEA – Efren Herrera 46-yard field goal, 12:05. Seahawks 3–0. **Drive: 8 plays, 39 yards, 2:45.**
- SDG – Rolf Benirschke 41-yard field goal, 9:03. Tied 3–3. **Drive: 6 plays, 54 yards, 2:54.**

**Second quarter**

- SDG – Greg McCrary 1-yard pass from Dan Fouts (Rolf Benirschke kick), 12:36. Chargers 10–3. **Drive: 3 plays, 5 yards, 1:28.**
- SDG – Charlie Joiner 19-yard pass from Dan Fouts (Rolf Benirschke kick), 5:52. Chargers 17–3. **Drive: 7 plays, 81 yards, 3:09.**
- SDG – John Jefferson 10-yard pass from Dan Fouts (Rolf Benirschke kick), 1:15. Chargers 24–3. **Drive: 6 plays, 47 yards, 2:37.**

**Third quarter**

- SEA – Efren Herrera 28-yard field goal, 8:18. Chargers 24–6. **Drive: 9 plays, 45 yards, 5:13.**
- SDG – John Jefferson 23-yard pass from Dan Fouts (Rolf Benirschke kick), 2:26. Chargers 31–6. **Drive: 3 plays, 30 yards, 1:17.**

**Fourth quarter**

- SEA – Sam McCullum 36-yard pass from Jim Zorn (Efren Herrera kick), 13:17. Chargers 31–13. **Drive: 5 plays, 45 yards, 1:31.**
- SDG – Rolf Benirschke 29-yard field goal, 1:50. Chargers 34–13. **Drive: 12 plays, 46 yards, 6:34.**

**Top passers**

- SDG – Dan Fouts – 21/31, 230 yards, 4 TD
- SEA – Jim Zorn – 18/33, 235 yards, TD, 2 INT

**Top rushers**

- SDG – John Cappelletti – 16 rushes, 112 yards
- SEA – Sherman Smith – 10 rushes, 37 yards

**Top receivers**

- SDG – John Jefferson – 6 receptions, 103 yards, 2 TD
- SEA – Steve Largent – 5 receptions, 62 yards

Chargers debutant Cappelletti set up his team's first field goal with a 46-yard run. The score was 3–3 early in the 2nd quarter when Seattle tried to punt from their own 28-yard line; Lowe blocked the kick, enabling his offense to start at the Seattle 5. Fouts found McCrary for the opening touchdown on 3rd and goal. On their next possession, Winslow had a 35-yard catch on 3rd and 5 and Joiner a 16-yarder on 3rd and 4; Joiner's touchdown followed on the next play. They soon made it three touchdowns in three possessions, with Jefferson's first touchdown coming on a 3rd-down play; the lead was 24–3 at halftime.

Seattle pulled three points closer with a field goal on their first drive of the second half, then forced a punt. Jim Zorn was intercepted by Shaw on the next play, soon leading to another Jefferson touchdown, again coming on 3rd down. Mike Williams also got an interception soon afterwards, and San Diego saw out the final quarter without difficulty.

Cappelletti's 112 yards represented his only 100-yard game with the Chargers (he had previously managed three with the Los Angeles Rams). He helped the Chargers to a 197–47 advantage in total rushing yardage. They converted 12 of 20 3rd down attempts, while Seattle converted only 2 of 13.

==== Week 2: vs. Oakland Raiders ====
Week Two: Oakland Raiders at San Diego Chargers – Game summary

Quarter	1	2	3	4	OT	Total
Raiders	3	7	7	7	0	**24**
**Chargers**	3	7	0	14	6	**30**

at Jack Murphy Stadium, San Diego, California

- Date: September 14
- Game time: 1:00 p.m. PDT
- Game weather: 68 °F (20 °C), relative humidity 68%, wind 8 miles per hour (13 km/h; 7.0 kn)
- Game attendance: 51,943
- Referee: Jim Tunney
- TV announcers (NBC): Dick Enberg and Merlin Olsen
- Box score

Game information

**First quarter**

- SDG – Rolf Benirschke 52-yard field goal, 8:22. Chargers 3–0. **Drive: 7 plays, 34 yards, 3:13.**
- OAK – Chris Bahr 35-yard field goal, 2:38. Tied 3–3. **Drive: 11 plays, 74 yards, 5:44.**

**Second quarter**

- SDG – John Jefferson 4-yard pass from Dan Fouts (Rolf Benirschke kick), 0:48. Chargers 10–3. **Drive: 9 plays, 55 yards, 2:38.**
- OAK – Cliff Branch 48-yard pass from Dan Pastorini (Chris Bahr kick), 0:06. Tied 10–10. **Drive: 4 plays, 82 yards, 0:42.**

**Third quarter**

- OAK – Willie Jones 11-yard fumble return (Chris Bahr kick), 8:15. Raiders 17–10.

**Fourth quarter**

- SDG – Kellen Winslow 25-yard pass from Dan Fouts (Rolf Benirschke kick), 11:35. Tied 17–17. **Drive: 6 plays, 65 yards, 3:14.**
- SDG – Clarence Williams 4-yard run (Rolf Benirschke kick), 2:00. Chargers 24–17. **Drive: 12 plays, 80 yards, 6:46.**
- OAK – Raymond Chester 18 yard pass from Jim Plunkett (Chris Bahr kick), 0:33. Tied 24–24. **Drive: 7 plays, 63 yards, 1:27.**

**Overtime**

- SDG – John Jefferson 24-yard pass from Dan Fouts, 6:51. Chargers 30–24. **Drive: 6 plays, 68 yards, 4:52.**

**Top passers**

- OAK – Dan Pastorini – 15/33, 238 yards, TD, 3 INT
- SDG – Dan Fouts – 29/44, 387 yards, 3 TD, 5 INT

**Top rushers**

- OAK – Kenny King – 13 rushes, 70 yards
- SDG – Clarence Williams – 17 rushes, 38 yards, TD

**Top receivers**

- OAK – Cliff Branch – 4 receptions, 99 yards, TD
- SDG – Kellen Winslow – 9 receptions, 132 yards, TD

Oakland attempted field goals on their first three possessions, but Chris Bahr only converted one of them, while Benirschke made a club-record 52-yarder; it was 3–3 midway through the 2nd quarter. Clarence Williams then lost a fumble in his own territory, but Horn recovered a mishandled snap a play later to win possession back. Following an exchange of punts, San Diego reached a 2nd and goal from the Oakland 4-yard line, and Jefferson made a spectacular one-handed touchdown catch with 48 seconds left in the half. That proved to be enough time for the Raiders, who moved from their own 18-yard line to the Charger 48-yard line, from where Dan Pastorini found Cliff Branch for the touchdown that tied the game at 10–10 with 6 seconds on the clock.

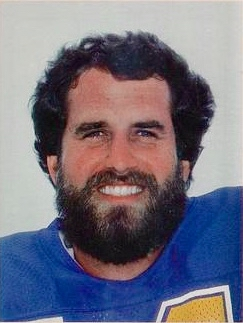
Dan Fouts set a then-team record with 387 yards passing versus the Oakland Raiders.

Fouts committed turnovers on five of the Chargers' seventeen 3rd-quarter plays. He lost a fumble that was run back for a Raiders touchdown and threw four interceptions, three in Oakland territory to end scoring chances and a fourth which set up a field goal try for Bahr. Bahr's kick was no good from 53 yards, and Clarence Williams gained 35 yards on the next four plays, setting up Winslow's touchdown. Oakland responded quickly, reaching a 1st and 10 at the Chargers 19-yard line before Edwards intercepted Pastorini. San Diego then drove 80 yards in 12 plays, including a 22-yard completion from Fouts to Winslow and a 4-yard touchdown run from Williams with 2:00 on the clock. Trailing 24–17, Oakland reached a 1st and 10 from the San Diego 16-yard line, from where Pastorini threw two incompletions before Gary Johnson sacked him for a loss of 7 and temporarily knocked him out of the game. Backup Jim Plunkett was then sacked by Johnson on 4th down, but the apparent game-clinching play was nullified by a penalty, and Plunkett threw the game-tying touchdown a play later. With 33 seconds on the clock, there was still time for Fouts to connect on three straight passes, giving Benirschke a chance to make a field goal from 51 yards out. The kick missed short and right, sending the game into overtime.

Oakland won the toss. Pastorini returned, but was intercepted again by Edwards on the first play of the extra period. On the following play, Fouts threw his fifth interception of the game, giving the Raiders the ball at the San Diego 46-yard line. They gained 14 yards before Bahr badly missed a 50-yard potential game-winner. Fouts connected with Joiner for 28 yards on the next drive, and the Chargers reached a 3rd and 11 at the Raiders 24-yard line. Fouts then lofted a high pass to Jefferson just short of the end. While Oakland defensive back Lester Hayes lost the ball in the sun, Jefferson leapt to make the catch, fell just outside the end zone and rolled over the goal line untouched for the winner, 8:09 into overtime.

Fouts had an eventful day, completing 29 of 44 for a club-record 387 yards, 3 touchdowns and 5 interceptions. San Diego had two 100-yard receivers: Winslow (9 catches for 132 yards and a touchdown) and Jefferson (9 for 110 yards and two touchdowns). San Diego won despite committing seven of the game's eleven turnovers. To date, this is the last win by a Chargers team over an eventual Super Bowl champion.

==== Week 3: at Denver Broncos ====
Week Three: San Diego Chargers at Denver Broncos – Game summary

Quarter	1	2	3	4	Total
**Chargers**	3	24	3	0	**30**
Broncos	3	3	7	0	**13**

at Mile High Stadium, Denver, Colorado

- Date: September 21
- Game time: 2:00 p.m. MDT
- Game weather: 66 °F (18.9 °C), relative humidity 37%, wind 9 miles per hour (14 km/h; 7.8 kn)
- Game attendance: 74,970
- Referee: Fred Silva
- TV announcers (NBC): Dick Enberg and Merlin Olsen
- Box score

Game information

**First quarter**

- SDG – Rolf Benirschke 53-yard field goal, 11:38. Chargers 3–0. **Drive: 6 plays, 45 yards, 3:22.**
- DEN – Fred Steinfort 51-yard field goal, 4:49. Tied 3–3. **Drive: 13 plays, 41 yards, 6:49.**

**Second quarter**

- SDG – John Cappelletti 1-yard run (Rolf Benirschke kick), 11:15. Chargers 10–3. **Drive: 7 plays, 41 yards, 3:41.**
- DEN – Fred Steinfort 46-yard field goal, 7:18. Chargers 10–6. **Drive: 4 plays, 5 yards, 0:52.**
- SDG – Charlie Joiner 22-yard pass from Dan Fouts (Rolf Benirschke kick), 5:55. Chargers 17–6. **Drive: 1 play, 22 yards, 0:05.**
- SDG – Glen Edwards 68-yard interception return (Rolf Benirschke kick), 2:20. Chargers 24–6.
- SDG – Rolf Benirschke 32-yard field goal, 0:00. Chargers 27–6. **Drive: 7 plays, 54 yards, 1:01.**

**Third quarter**

- SDG – Rolf Benirschke 42-yard field goal, 8:17. Chargers 30–6. **Drive: 4 plays, 3 yards, 0:50.**
- DEN – Haven Moses 15-yard pass from Craig Morton (Fred Steinfort kick), 4:15. Chargers 30–13. **Drive: 8 plays, 80 yards, 4:02.**

**Fourth quarter**

- No scoring plays.

**Top passers**

- SDG – Dan Fouts – 13/27, 211 yards, TD, 3 INT
- DEN – Matt Robinson – 13/25, 146 yards, 4 INT

**Top rushers**

- SDG – Clarence Williams – 16 rushes, 53 yards
- DEN – Jim Jensen – 12 rushes, 85 yards

**Top receivers**

- SDG – Charlie Joiner – 4 receptions, 80 yards, TD
- DEN – Haven Moses – 5 receptions, 103 yards, TD

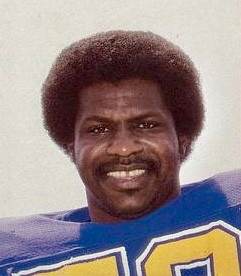
Gary Johnson had a career-high four sacks against the Denver Broncos.

On the opening possession, Benirschke broke the Charger record for longest field goal for the second consecutive week, this time converting from 53 yards out. After Denver tied the score, a 41-yard connection between Fouts and Winslow had San Diego back in Broncos territory, but Fouts was intercepted. Dean won possession back when he recovered a fumbled snap. Cappelletti converted a 3rd and 5 with an 11-yard catch early in the ensuing drive, which he ended with his first Charger touchdown. Another Fouts interception led to a Denver field goal, and the Chargers then went three-and-out. On the next play, Woodrow Lowe intercepted Matt Robinson, and ran the ball back 28 yards to the Denver 22-yard line. Fouts found Joiner in the end zone on the next play. Denver then reached the Chargers 45-yard line, but a Johnson sack pushed them back 9 yards, and Edwards intercepted a Robinson pass two plays later, returning it 68 yards for a touchdown. Benirschke added another field goal before halftime, pushing the lead to 27–6.

Fouts was intercepted early in the second half, but Robinson was also intercepted three plays later, with Edwards' 20-yard return setting up a field goal. Denver scored a touchdown on their next possession, and drove inside the Chargers 20-yard line three times in the final quarter. Each of these scoring chances ended with an interception, and Denver came no closer.

San Diego won in Denver for the first time since 1968 (they had tied there in 1970). Edwards had two of the Chargers' total of six interceptions; they had seven takeaways to the Broncos' three. San Diego finished with six sacks for 49 yards in losses, including a career-high four sacks by Johnson.

==== Week 4: at Kansas City Chiefs ====
Week Four: San Diego Chargers at Kansas City Chiefs – Game summary

Quarter	1	2	3	4	Total
**Chargers**	7	14	3	0	**24**
Chiefs	0	7	0	0	**7**

at Arrowhead Stadium, Kansas City, Missouri

- Date: September 28
- Game time: 3:00 p.m. CDT
- Game weather: 58 °F (14.4 °C), relative humidity 59%, wind 8 miles per hour (13 km/h; 7.0 kn)
- Game attendance: 45,161
- Referee: Gene Barth
- TV announcers (NBC): Jay Randolph and Gene Washington
- Box score

Game information

**First quarter**

- SDG – John Cappelletti 3-yard run (Rolf Benirschke kick), 0:40. Chargers 7–0. **Drive: 1 play, 3 yards, 0:04.**

**Second quarter**

- KAN – Ted McKnight 1-yard run (Nick Lowery kick), 8:28. Tied 7–7. **Drive: 13 plays, 80 yards, 7:12.**
- SDG – Kellen Winslow 15-yard pass from Dan Fouts (Rolf Benirschke kick), 2:02. Chargers 14–7. **Drive: 3 plays, 32 yards, 1:18.**
- SDG – Kellen Winslow 16-yard pass from Dan Fouts (Rolf Benirschke kick), 0:33. Chargers 21–7. **Drive: 3 plays, 58 yards, 0:22.**

**Third quarter**

- SDG – Rolf Benirschke 32-yard field goal, 12:05. Chargers 24–6. **Drive: 5 plays, 15 yards, 1:55.**

**Fourth quarter**

- No scoring plays.

**Top passers**

- SDG – Dan Fouts – 15/30, 194 yards, 2 TD
- KAN – Tom Clements – 7/12, 77 yards

**Top rushers**

- SDG – John Cappelletti – 18 rushes, 51 yards, TD
- KAN – Ted McKnight – 11 rushes, 34 yards, TD

**Top receivers**

- SDG – Kellen Winslow – 6 receptions, 74 yards, 2 TD
- KAN – Ted McKnight – 5 receptions, 36 yards

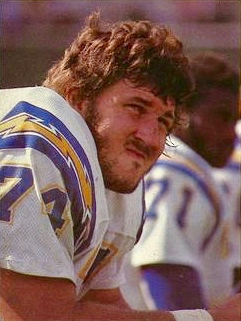
Louie Kelcher recovered a fumble and had an interception in a win over Kansas City.

After five punts to start the game, Kelcher recovered a fumble at the Kansas City 3-yard line, and Cappelletti scored on the next play. The Chiefs responded by converting three 3rd downs and tying the score. Winslow scored twice in quick succession late in the half. His first touchdown was set up by Laslavic's forced fumble and Stringert's recovery and 26-yard return; after a Kansas City three-and-out, his second was set up by Jefferson's 42-yard reception, giving the Chargers a 21–7 halftime lead.

Benirschke added a field goal early in the 3rd quarter following a Kelcher interception, which proved to be the game's final points. Kansas City didn't cross midfield on their next four drives; when they did reach the Chargers 30-yard line late in the game, Horn recovered a fumble to end the threat.

Dean had three of the Chargers' five sacks. After completing a sweep of their divisional rivals, the Chargers led the AFC West by two games.

==== Week 5: vs. Buffalo Bills ====
Week Five: Buffalo Bills at San Diego Chargers – Game summary

Quarter	1	2	3	4	Total
**Bills**	3	9	0	14	**26**
Chargers	7	10	7	0	**24**

at San Diego Stadium, San Diego, California

- Date: October 5
- Game time: 1:00 p.m. PDT
- Game weather: 68 °F (20 °C), relative humidity 82%, wind 10 miles per hour (16 km/h; 8.7 kn)
- Game attendance: 51,982
- Referee: Bob McElwee
- TV announcers (NBC): Charlie Jones and Len Dawson
- Box score

Game information

**First quarter**

- BUF – Nick Mike-Mayer 48-yard field goal, 10:11. Bills 3–0. **Drive: 6 plays, 18 yards, 3:17.**
- SDG – Kellen Winslow 4-yard pass from Dan Fouts (Rolf Benirschke kick), 5:44. Chargers 7–3. **Drive: 11 plays, 74 yards, 2:50.**

**Second quarter**

- SDG – John Jefferson 5-yard pass from Dan Fouts (Rolf Benirschke kick), 14:56. Chargers 14–3. **Drive: 9 plays, 55 yards, 2:02.**
- BUF – Nick Mike-Mayer 29-yard field goal, 8:51. Chargers 14–6. **Drive: 12 plays, 69 yards, 6:05.**
- BUF – Lucius Sanford blocked punt recovery in end zone (kick failed), 2:24. Chargers 14–12.
- SDG – Rolf Benirschke 29-yard field goal, 0:12. Chargers 17–12. **Drive: 10 plays, 76 yards, 2:12.**

**Third quarter**

- SDG – Clarence Williams 3-yard run (Rolf Benirschke kick), 6:19. Chargers 24–12. **Drive: 6 plays, 39 yards, 2:25.**

**Fourth quarter**

- BUF – Mark Brammer 9-yard pass from Joe Ferguson (Nick Mike-Mayer kick), 10:43. Chargers 24–19. **Drive: 4 plays, 16 yards, 1:34.**
- BUF – Joe Cribbs 3-yard run (Nick Mike-Mayer kick), 7:28. Bills 26–24. **Drive: 5 plays, 21 yards, 2:54.**

**Top passers**

- BUF – Joe Ferguson – 14/28, 129 yards, TD
- SDG – Dan Fouts – 20/35, 220 yards, 2 TD, INT

**Top rushers**

- BUF – Joe Cribbs – 23 rushes, 87 yards, TD
- SDG – Chuck Muncie – 10 rushes, 37 yards

**Top receivers**

- BUF – Jerry Butler – 3 receptions, 44 yards
- SDG – John Jefferson – 7 receptions, 85 yards, TD

In a battle of unbeaten teams, Buffalo led 3–0 in the opening quarter when Lowe forced Bills' running back Joe Cribbs to fumble and Buchanon recovered at the Buffalo 44-yard line. Jefferson had 22- and 12-yard catches on the next two plays, and Winslow's touchdown followed on 3rd and goal. A minute later, Buchanon pressured Buffalo's punter, forcing him to run; he was stopped well short of a first down, and San Diego took over at the Buffalo 29-yard line. Jefferson's touchdown followed, again on 3rd and goal. The Bills responded with a field goal after Shaw and Edwards collided in the end zone while trying to make an interception. Buffalo later blocked a Partridge punt and recovered it in the end zone for a touchdown. Muncie converted a 3rd and 5 with a 12-yard run early in the following drive, which ended with a Benirschke field goal and a 17–13 lead at the break.

Mike Williams blocked a punt at the start of the second half, but Benirschke missed wide right from 30 yards out. Young sacked Joe Ferguson on 3rd down, forcing Buffalo to punt from deep in their own territory, and San Diego took over on the Buffalo 39-yard line. They scored on the ensuing drive; Clarence Williams converted a 3rd and 2 with a 12-yard catch, and scored from 3 yards out two plays later. Buffalo went for it on 4th and 1 from the Charger 10-yard line early in the 4th quarter, but Cribbs was stuffed for no gain. However, there was another punting error soon afterwards, Partridge struggling to field a high snap and getting tackled well behind the line. That set up a Bills touchdown on 4th and 3 from the 9. On the next play from scrimmage, Fouts was intercepted, and Cribbs scored the winner five plays later. These two Buffalo scores came 3:15 apart, after drives covering 16 and 21 yards. San Diego looked to respond quickly, but Winslow fumbled after what would have been a first down reception at the Bills 25-yard line. Television replays indicated that Winslow was down before he lost possession of the ball. After the turnover, Buffalo picked up three first downs to run the final 4:38 off the clock.

==== Week 6: at Oakland Raiders ====
Week Six: San Diego Chargers at Oakland Raiders – Game summary

Quarter	1	2	3	4	Total
Chargers	7	3	7	7	**24**
**Raiders**	7	10	7	14	**38**

at Oakland-Alameda County Coliseum, Oakland, California

- Date: October 12
- Game time: 1:00 p.m. PDT
- Game weather: 62 °F (16.7 °C), relative humidity 78%, wind 9 miles per hour (14 km/h; 7.8 kn)
- Game attendance: 44,826
- Referee: Ben Dreith
- TV announcers (NBC): Dick Enberg and Merlin Olsen
- Box score

Game information

**First quarter**

- OAK – Kenny King 31-yard run (Chris Bahr kick), 12:41. Raiders 7–0. **Drive: 4 play, 60 yards, 1:33.**
- SDG – John Cappelletti 5-yard run (Rolf Benirschke kick), 5:26. Tied 7–7. **Drive: 8 plays, 82 yards, 3:34.**

**Second quarter**

- OAK – Chris Bahr 42-yard field goal, 13:14. Raiders 10–7. **Drive: 7 plays, 39 yards, 2:42.**
- SDG – Rolf Benirschke 25-yard field goal, 9:30. Tied 10–10. **Drive: 9 plays, 60 yards, 3:44.**
- OAK – Cliff Branch 43-yard pass from Jim Plunkett (Chris Bahr kick), 4:09. Raiders 17–10. **Drive: 2 plays, 46 yards, 0:41.**

**Third quarter**

- OAK – Mark van Eeghen 3-yard run (Chris Bahr kick), 7:30. Raiders 24–10. **Drive: 13 plays, 68 yards, 7:30.**
- SDG – John Jefferson 25-yard pass from Dan Fouts (Rolf Benirschke kick), 5:27. Raiders 24–17. **Drive: 4 plays, 71 yards, 2:03.**

**Fourth quarter**

- SDG – Dan Fouts 1-yard run (Rolf Benirschke kick), 14:26. Tied 24–24. **Drive: 7 plays, 46 yards, 2:21.**
- OAK – Kenny King 89-yard run (Chris Bahr kick), 14:03. Raiders 31–24. **Drive: 1 play, 89 yards, 0:23.**
- OAK – Todd Christensen offensive fumble recovery in end zone (Chris Bahr kick), 13:52. Raiders 38–24.

**Top passers**

- SDG – Dan Fouts – 23/39, 388 yards, TD, 2 INT
- OAK – Jim Plunkett – 11/14, 164 yards, TD

**Top rushers**

- SDG – Chuck Muncie – 7 rushes, 39 yards
- OAK – Kenny King – 12 rushes, 138 yards, 2 TD

**Top receivers**

- SDG – Charlie Joiner – 8 receptions, 135 yards
- OAK – Dave Casper – 3 receptions, 61 yards

Kenny King rushed 31 yards for a touchdown on the Raiders' opening possession. San Diego tied the score when Jefferson had a 34-yard reception and Cappelletti scored one play later. Fouts lost a fumble after leading his team to the Oakland 21-yard line, and the teams exchanged 2nd-quarter field goals. The Chargers later had a first down at their own 45-yard line but were pushed back 21 yards by a mix of penalties and negative plays; Partridge's punt covered only 32 yards, and a 43-yard connection from Plunkett to Branch put Oakland up 17–10; that remained the score at halftime after Benirschke missed a 43-yard field goal.

An unnecessary roughness penalty by Lowe prolonged the first drive of the second half, which took half the 3rd quarter and ended with a Mark van Eeghen touchdown. Jefferson began the next drive with a 28-yard catch and finished it with a 25-yarder for the touchdown. Stringert recovered a fumble on the ensuing kickoff, but Cappelletti fumbled the ball back four plays later. San Diego were soon threatening again after Oakland went three-and-out; they eventually went for it on 4th and goal from the 1, and Fouts sneaked across the goal line to tie the score at 24–24. Oakland rebuilt their lead with 14 points in the next 34 seconds. On the next play from scrimmage, King broke off left tackle and went 89 yards for a touchdown, shrugging off an attempted tackle by Pete Shaw at the Chargers 40-yard line. Muncie mishandled the ensuing kickoff, and Oakland recovered in the end zone. Fourteen minutes still remained in the 4th quarter, and the Chargers penetrated Raider territory on each of their three remaining possessions, but were foiled by a fumble, a turnover on downs and an interception.

With 388 passing yards, Fouts beat his own Chargers single-game record by a yard. He was sacked seven times for the loss of 43 yards. The Chargers again had two 100-yard receivers: Joiner had 8 receptions for 135 yards, while Jefferson contributed 5 for 114 and a touchdown.

==== Week 7: vs. New York Giants ====
Week Seven: New York Giants at San Diego Chargers – Game summary

Quarter	1	2	3	4	Total
Giants	0	0	7	0	**7**
**Chargers**	0	21	7	16	**44**

at Jack Murphy Stadium, San Diego, California

- Date: October 19
- Game time: 1:00 p.m. PDT
- Game weather: 67 °F (19.4 °C), relative humidity 44%, wind 9 miles per hour (14 km/h; 7.8 kn)
- Game attendance: 50,397
- Referee: Fred Wyant
- TV announcers (CBS): Lindsey Nelson and Hank Stram
- Box score

Game information

**First quarter**

- No scoring plays

**Second quarter**

- SDG – John Cappelletti 1-yard run (Rolf Benirschke kick). Chargers 7–0.
- SDG – John Jefferson 39-yard pass from Dan Fouts (Rolf Benirschke kick). Chargers 14–0.
- SDG – Charlie Joiner 11-yard pass from Dan Fouts (Rolf Benirschke kick). Chargers 21–0.

**Third quarter**

- NYG – Billy Taylor 1-yard run (Joe Danelo kick). Chargers 21–7.
- SDG – John Cappelletti 1-yard run (Rolf Benirschke kick). Chargers 28–7.

**Fourth quarter**

- SDG – John Floyd 31-yard pass from Dan Fouts (kick failed). Chargers 34–7.
- SDG – Rolf Benirschke 50-yard field goal. Chargers 37–7.
- SDG – Chuck Muncie 5-yard run (Rolf Benirschke kick). Chargers 44–7.

**Top passers**

- NYG – Phil Simms – 14/29, 135 yards, 2 INT
- SDG – Dan Fouts – 26/41, 444 yards, 3 TD, INT

**Top rushers**

- NYG – Bo Matthews – 10 rushes, 33 yards, TD
- SDG – Chuck Muncie – 9 rushes, 56 yards, TD

**Top receivers**

- NYG – Tom Mullady – 2 receptions, 42 yards
- SDG – Charlie Joiner – 10 receptions, 171 yards, TD

With New York offering little on offense, the Chargers could afford to turn the ball over twice in the first half and still lead 21–0, with Cappelletti, Jefferson and Joiner all scoring. Jefferson was left unmarked for his touchdown due to a mix-up in the defensive backfield, while Joiner's touchdown was set up by Edwards' interception and 34-yard return. New York's lone touchdown was set up by a special teams error, Partridge mishandling a snap near his goal line; Cappelletti found the end zone again four plays into the Chargers' response. New York threatened further points, but Phil Simms fumbled inside the Chargers 10. Facing a 2nd and 35 from his own 31-yard line soon afterwards, Fouts converted with a 14-yard pass to Muncie and a 24-yarder to Jefferson. Floyd scored three plays later when two would-be tacklers collided. Muncie's first Chargers touchdown was set up by Laslavic's interception at the New York 21-yard line.

The first four San Diego touchdown drives featured a combined 251 yards passing and only 24 rushing. Fouts' 444 yards broke the franchise record for passing yards for the third time that season, and the second week in a row. This new record would be tied in 1982 by Fouts but not surpassed until 2010, by Philip Rivers. San Diego also boasted three 100-yard receivers for the first time in team history and just the second time in NFL history: Joiner, 10 for 171 yards and a touchdown; Jefferson, 5 for 107 yards and a touchdown; Winslow, 6 for 102 yards. The Chargers outgained New York 567–206.

==== Week 8: at Dallas Cowboys ====
Week Eight: San Diego Chargers at Dallas Cowboys – Game summary

Quarter	1	2	3	4	Total
Chargers	3	21	0	7	**31**
**Cowboys**	7	7	21	7	**42**

at Texas Stadium, Irving, Texas

- Date: October 26
- Game time: 8:00 p.m. CST
- Game weather: 55 °F (12.8 °C), relative humidity 59%, wind 9 miles per hour (14 km/h; 7.8 kn)
- Game attendance: 60,639
- Referee: Dick Jorgensen
- TV announcers (ABC): Frank Gifford, Don Meredith and Howard Cosell
- Box score

Game information

**First quarter**

- SDG – Rolf Benirschke 45-yard field goal, 12:43. Chargers 3–0. **Drive: 7 plays, 32 yards, 2:17.**
- DAL – Ron Springs 4-yard run (Rafael Septien kick), 1:58. Cowboys 7–3. **Drive: 3 play, 35 yards, 0:26.**

**Second quarter**

- SDG – John Jefferson 58-yard pass from Dan Fouts (Rolf Benirschke kick), 10:20. Chargers 10–7. **Drive: 3 plays, 65 yards, 1:45.**
- SDG – Woodrow Lowe 16-yard interception return (Rolf Benirschke kick), 8:30. Chargers 17–7.
- DAL – Butch Johnson 17-yard pass from Danny White (Rafael Septien kick), 2:57. Chargers 17–14. **Drive: 12 play, 75 yards, 5:33.**
- SDG – Kellen Winslow 9-yard pass from Dan Fouts (Rolf Benirschke kick), 1:37. Chargers 24–14. **Drive: 5 plays, 63 yards, 1:20.**

**Third quarter**

- DAL – Timmy Newsome 1-yard run (Rafael Septien kick), 10:55. Chargers 24–21. **Drive: 7 play, 55 yards, 4:05.**
- DAL – Timmy Newsome 1-yard run (Rafael Septien kick), 5:08. Cowboys 28–24. **Drive: 9 play, 60 yards, 4:41.**
- DAL – Jay Saldi 12-yard pass from Danny White (Rafael Septien kick), 2:37. Cowboys 35–24. **Drive: 3 play, 20 yards, 1:37.**

**Fourth quarter**

- DAL – Billy Joe DuPree 9-yard pass from Danny White (Rafael Septien kick), 9:43. Cowboys 42–24. **Drive: 8 play, 45 yards, 3:04.**
- SDG – Kellen Winslow 3-yard pass from Dan Fouts (Rolf Benirschke kick), 1:41. Cowboys 42–31. **Drive: 7 plays, 55 yards, 1:08.**

**Top passers**

- SDG – Dan Fouts – 21/44, 371 yards, 3 TD, 4 INT
- DAL – Danny White – 22/34, 260 yards, 3 TD, INT

**Top rushers**

- SDG – Chuck Muncie – 11 rushes, 71 yards
- DAL – Ron Springs – 13 rushes, 61 yards, TD

**Top receivers**

- SDG – John Jefferson – 8 receptions, 160 yards, TD
- DAL – Billy Joe DuPree – 5 receptions, 45 yards, TD

San Diego led 3–0 after Benirschke made a field goal and Rafael Septien missed one. The Chargers had the ball in Dallas territory when Fouts threw his first interception, leading to a touchdown three plays later. Danny White, a quarterback and punter for the Cowboys, converted a 4th and 1 when he ran 19 yards with a fake punt, though the drive ended with another miss from Septien. San Diego retook the lead on a fluke play, a pass deflecting from Joiner straight to Jefferson who went in untouched for a 58-yard touchdown. Only three plays later, Lowe intercepted White and ran it back 16 yards for another score. Dallas scored a touchdown on their next possession, but the Chargers came straight back with a 33-yard catch by Joiner coming one play before a Winslow touchdown. Benirschke missed a 45-yard field goal as time expired, but San Diego led 24–14 at the break.

Dallas scored on their first possession of the second half, then forced a Chargers three-and-out. On the next drive, White again ran for a first down from a punt formation, this time gaining 12 yards on 4th and 11; that drive ended with another Dallas touchdown and a 28–24 lead. Muncie lost fumbles on the next two Chargers possessions, the first of which led to another Dallas touchdown. Winslow had a 65-yard catch early in the final quarter, but he also fumbled. Fouts was intercepted on the next three San Diego drives, giving the Chargers six turnovers in as many possessions. Dallas scored their fourth unanswered touchdown after the first interception, and there was only 1:41 left on the clock when Winslow scored his second.

The Chargers again had multiple 100-yard receivers. Jefferson had 8 catches for 160 yards and a touchdown, his third 100-yard game in a row, while Winslow caught 5 passes for 110 yards and 2 touchdowns. They outgained Dallas by 449 yards to 425, but turned the ball over seven times to the Cowboys' two. With three losses in four games, the Chargers dropped into a tie with Oakland atop the AFC West.

==== Week 9: at Cincinnati Bengals ====
Week Nine: San Diego Chargers at Cincinnati Bengals – Game summary

Quarter	1	2	3	4	Total
**Chargers**	10	7	14	0	**31**
Bengals	0	7	0	7	**14**

at Riverfront Stadium, Cincinnati, Ohio

- Date: November 2
- Game time: 1:00 p.m. EST
- Game weather: 42 °F (5.6 °C), relative humidity 58%, wind 6 miles per hour (9.7 km/h; 5.2 kn)
- Game attendance: 46,406
- Referee: Cal Lepore
- TV announcers (NBC): Charlie Jones and Len Dawson
- Box score

Game information

**First quarter**

- SDG – Mike Thomas 7-yard run (Rolf Benirschke kick). Chargers 7–0.
- SDG – Rolf Benirschke 40-yard field goal. Chargers 10–0.

**Second quarter**

- SDG – Kellen Winslow 11-yard pass from Dan Fouts (Rolf Benirschke kick). Chargers 17–0.
- CIN – Don Bass 11-yard pass from Ken Anderson (Ian Sunter kick). Chargers 17–7.

**Third quarter**

- SDG – John Jefferson 9-yard pass from Dan Fouts (Rolf Benirschke kick). Chargers 24–7.
- SDG – John Jefferson 16-yard pass from Dan Fouts (Rolf Benirschke kick). Chargers 31–7.

**Fourth quarter**

- CIN – Deacon Turner 15-yard pass from Jack Thompson (Ian Sunter kick). Chargers 31–14.

**Top passers**

- SDG – Dan Fouts – 22/41, 270 yards, 3 TD
- CIN – Ken Anderson – 14/25, 127 yards, TD, INT

**Top rushers**

- SDG – Mike Thomas – 16 rushes, 71 yards, TD
- CIN – Deacon Turner – 7 rushes, 37 yards

**Top receivers**

- SDG – Kellen Winslow – 9 receptions, 153 yards, TD
- CIN – Dan Ross – 8 receptions, 87 yards

Lowe blocked a punt on Cincinnati's first possession, and San Diego only had to go 13 yards for the game's opening touchdown. After Benirschke added a field goal, Winslow opened the Chargers' second touchdown drive with a 21-yard catch and finished it with an 11-yard touchdown. Cincinnati managed a touchdown shortly before halftime, but Jefferson added a pair of touchdowns in the 3rd quarter. The first of these was a one-handed catch set up by Winslow's 47-yard gain; the second came after a Shaw interception, and was aided by a Bengals' miscommunication that left him completely unmarked at the line of scrimmage. Shaw added two more interceptions in the final quarter.

San Diego didn't turn the ball over at all; they had committed 20 turnovers in the previous four games. Shaw became the eighth Charger to make three interceptions in a single game.

==== Week 10: vs. Denver Broncos ====
Week Ten: Denver Broncos at San Diego Chargers – Game summary

Quarter	1	2	3	4	Total
**Broncos**	0	7	6	7	**20**
Chargers	0	6	0	7	**13**

at Jack Murphy Stadium, San Diego, California

- Date: November 9
- Game time: 1:00 p.m. PST
- Game weather: 61 °F (16.1 °C), relative humidity 86%, wind 6 miles per hour (9.7 km/h; 5.2 kn)
- Game attendance: 51,435
- Referee: Jerry Markbreit
- TV announcers (NBC): Charlie Jones and Len Dawson
- Box score

Game information

**First quarter**

- No scoring plays

**Second quarter**

- SDG – Rolf Benirschke 30-yard field goal, 11:35. Chargers 3–0. **Drive: 15 plays, 65 yards, 6:51.**
- SDG – Rolf Benirschke 34-yard field goal, 6:42. Chargers 6–0. **Drive: 7 plays, 72 yards, 3:05.**
- DEN – Rob Lytle 3-yard run (Fred Steinfort kick), 4:52. Broncos 7–6. **Drive: 3 plays, 43 yards, 1:37.**

**Third quarter**

- DEN – Fred Steinfort 28-yard field goal, 11:15. Broncos 10–6. **Drive: 6 plays, 27 yards, 2:56.**
- DEN – Fred Steinfort 42-yard field goal, 3:32. Broncos 13–6. **Drive: 10 plays, 42 yards, 4:49.**

**Fourth quarter**

- DEN – Dave Preston 3-yard run (Fred Steinfort kick), 12:53. Broncos 20–6. **Drive: 7 plays, 51 yards, 3:37.**
- SDG – John Jefferson 3-yard pass from Dan Fouts (Rolf Benirschke kick), 1:26. Broncos 20–13. **Drive: 5 plays, 76 yards, 0:38.**

**Top passers**

- DEN – Craig Morton – 12/24, 144 yards
- SDG – Dan Fouts – 29/45, 363 yards, TD, INT

**Top rushers**

- DEN – Dave Preston – 15 rushes, 40 yards, TD
- SDG – Chuck Muncie – 23 rushes, 115 yards

**Top receivers**

- DEN – Riley Odoms – 3 receptions, 47 yards
- SDG – Charlie Joiner – 9 receptions, 127 yards

San Diego's first trip into Broncos territory ended with a Joiner fumble at the 29-yard line. Winslow converted a pair of 3rd downs on their next drive, which ended in a Benirschke field goal. Their following drive produced another field goal after Muncie lost a yard on 3rd and 1 from the 15. Denver had gained only one first down from four offensive series up to that point, but scored only three plays after a 53-yard kickoff return set them up at the Chargers 43-yard line. Benirschke missed a 38-yard kick late in the half, leaving Denver 7–6 ahead.

The first three Chargers drives after halftime ended with a Fouts fumble, a Benirschke miss and a Fouts interception. Denver answered with points each time, extending their lead to 20–6 with thirteen minutes to play. Fouts ran for 2 yards on 4th and 1 as the Chargers advanced to the Denver 19-yard line, but the drive ended there when he threw incomplete on 4th and 2; he was again incomplete on a 4th and 7 from the Denver 35 with four minutes left. Finally, Fouts completed 4 of 5 passes for 76 yards and a late touchdown to Jefferson, but Denver recovered an onside kick and ran the clock out.

San Diego dropped a game behind Oakland with the defeat. Fouts was sacked six times for a loss of 39 yards. San Diego gained more than double the offensive yardage of Denver (459–219) and more than double the first downs (26–11), but gave up all three of the game's turnovers.

==== Week 11: vs. Kansas City Chiefs ====
Week Eleven: Kansas City Chiefs at San Diego Chargers – Game summary

Quarter	1	2	3	4	Total
Chiefs	7	0	0	0	**7**
**Chargers**	0	6	7	7	**20**

at Jack Murphy Stadium, San Diego, California

- Date: November 16
- Game time: 1:00 p.m. PST
- Game weather: 60 °F (15.6 °C), relative humidity 37%, wind 8 miles per hour (13 km/h; 7.0 kn)
- Game attendance: 50,248
- Referee: Pat Haggerty
- TV announcers (NBC): Sam Nover and Bob Trumpy
- Box score

Game information

**First quarter**

- KAN – Steve Fuller 4-yard run (Nick Lowery kick), 1:41. Chiefs 7–0. **Drive: 5 plays, 46 yards, 2:18.**

**Second quarter**

- SDG – Mike Thomas 4-yard run (kick failed), 7:15. Chiefs 7–6. **Drive: 5 plays, 21 yards, 2:08.**

**Third quarter**

- SDG – Mike Thomas 7-yard run (Rolf Benirschke kick), 5:36. Chargers 13–7. **Drive: 11 plays, 80 yards, 4:25.**

**Fourth quarter**

- SDG – Clarence Williams 7-yard run (Rolf Benirschke kick), 6:21. Chargers 20–7. **Drive: 10 plays, 59 yards, 5:58.**

**Top passers**

- KAN – Steve Fuller – 15/22, 125 yards
- SDG – Dan Fouts – 22/39, 222 yards, INT

**Top rushers**

- KAN – Horace Belton – 9 rushes, 38 yards
- SDG – Mike Thomas – 27 rushes, 109 yards, 2 TD

**Top receivers**

- KAN – Tony Reed – 7 receptions, 80 yards
- SDG – Kellen Winslow – 5 receptions, 57 yards

Benirschke missed a 43-yard field goal midway through the opening quarter. Later, a 30-yard punt by Partridge set Kansas City up at the Chargers 46-yard line, and they scored five plays later. On the following drive Benirschke missed again, this time from 35 yards out. Soon afterwards, Chiefs quarterback Steve Fuller was sacked by Lowe, forcing a fumble that Johnson recovered at the Kansas City 21-yard line. Mike Thomas scored five plays later, though a failed extra point kept the Chargers behind. San Diego reached a 3rd and 9 at the Chiefs 23-yard line later in the half, but Fouts was intercepted in the end zone. Kansas City also crossed midfield, but were stopped by Johnson's 3rd-down sack and led 7–6 at halftime.

Fouts completed 5 of 6 passes for 64 yards on the first Chargers drive of the second half, leading to Thomas' second touchdown. The next two Kansas City drives ended in fumbles, forced by Jones and Shaw and recovered by Young and Buchanon. Benirschke failed on field goal attempts after both turnovers (one miss and one block), giving him six consecutive failures over the past two games. After forcing a punt, San Diego ran eight times on a 10-play drive, with Clarence Williams scoring an insurance touchdown 6:21 from time.

Kansas City never crossed the Chargers 45 after their early scoring drive; San Diego picked up 30 first downs to 10 by the Chiefs. The San Diego defense sacked Fuller five times (Jones had two of them), and forced six fumbles, three of which the Chargers recovered.

==== Week 12: at Miami Dolphins ====
Week Twelve: San Diego Chargers at Miami Dolphins – Game summary

Quarter	1	2	3	4	OT	Total
**Chargers**	7	10	7	0	3	**27**
Dolphins	7	10	0	7	0	**24**

at Orange Bowl, Miami, Florida

- Date: November 20
- Game time: 8:30 p.m. EST
- Game weather: 64 °F (17.8 °C), relative humidity 72%, wind 12 miles per hour (19 km/h; 10 kn)
- Game attendance: 63,013
- Referee: Gene Barth
- TV announcers (ABC): Frank Gifford, Fran Tarkenton and Howard Cosell
- Box score

Game information

**First quarter**

- MIA – Terry Robiskie 6-yard run (Uwe von Schamann kick), 11:11. Dolphins 7–0. **Drive: 8 play, 58 yards, 3:49.**
- SDG – Clarence Williams 4-yard pass from Dan Fouts (Rolf Benirschke kick), 6:21. Tied 7–7. **Drive: 11 plays, 73 yards, 4:50.**

**Second quarter**

- SDG – Rolf Benirschke 37-yard field goal, 11:11. Chargers 10–7. **Drive: 7 plays, 9 yards, 2:40.**
- MIA – Tony Nathan 7-yard pass from David Woodley (Uwe von Schamann kick), 6:17. Dolphins 14–10. **Drive: 6 plays, 71 yards, 4:13.**
- SDG – Charlie Joiner 7-yard pass from Dan Fouts (Rolf Benirschke kick), 1:08. Chargers 17–14. **Drive: 7 plays, 83 yards, 1:43.**
- MIA – Uwe von Schamann 48-yard field goal, 0:03. Tied 17–17. **Drive: 4 plays, 38 yards, 1:05.**

**Third quarter**

- SDG – John Jefferson 6-yard pass from Dan Fouts (Rolf Benirschke kick), 3:50. Chargers 24–17. **Drive: 8 plays, 65 yards, 3:43.**

**Fourth quarter**

- MIA – Delvin Williams 1-yard run (Uwe von Schamann kick), 1:21. Tied 24–24. **Drive: 10 play, 49 yards, 4:14.**

**Overtime**

- SDG – Rolf Benirschke 28-yard field goal, 7:46. Chargers 27–24. **Drive: 4 plays, 2 yards, 1:52.**

**Top passers**

- SDG – Dan Fouts – 25/41, 226 yards, 3 TD
- MIA – Danny White – 22/34, 251 yards, TD, 2 INT

**Top rushers**

- SDG – Chuck Muncie – 10 rushes, 77 yards
- MIA – Terry Robiskie – 10 rushes, 35 yards, TD

**Top receivers**

- SDG – Charlie Joiner – 5 receptions, 53 yards, TD
  SDG – Kellen Winslow – 7 receptions, 53 yards
- MIA – Tony Nathan – 7 receptions, 102 yards, TD

Terry Robiskie put Miami ahead on the game's opening drive, but San Diego responded in kind, Fouts converting 3rd downs with completions to Joiner and Williams, the latter for a touchdown. The Dolphins threatened to score again on their next possession, but Jones forced David Woodley to fumble in Chargers territory and Johnson recovered. Woodley was intercepted by Buchanon on the next Miami drive, and Benirschke kicked San Diego ahead. Tony Nathan took a Woodley pass 61 yards on 3rd and 9; the pair combined for a 7-yard touchdown on 3rd and goal to finish the drive. Muncie broke off a 53-yard run late in the half and Joiner scored five plays later. Woodley's 39-yard pass positioned Miami for Uwe von Schamann's field goal with 3 seconds on the clock, tying the score at 17–17.

Muncie lost a fumble near midfield on the second play of the 3rd quarter. Following an exchange of punts, Miami crossed midfield, but von Schamann was short on a 52-yard attempt. On the next drive, Muncie had receptions of 11 and 17 yards before Jefferson's touchdown on 3rd and 4 from the 6-yard line. The Dolphins responded by driving from their 37 to the Chargers' 1-yard line, where Kelcher stuffed Robiskie on 4th and goal. However, the Dolphins converted two 4th downs on their next drive and tied the score with 1:21 to play. San Diego reached the Miami 41-yard line in response, but Fouts threw four incompletions; Miami drove to midfield, but Woodley was sacked by Charles DeJurnett as time expired.

San Diego won the toss in overtime, but their opening drive stalled at the Dolphins 42-yard line, and Partridge's punt went into the end zone for a touchback. Woodley led Miami to a 3rd and 5 at their own 37, from where his pass was intercepted by Lowe and run back 28 yards to the 12-yard line. Benirschke hit the winner four plays later.

Jones had two sacks for the second week in a row. Three days later, Oakland's six-game winning streak came to an end in Philadelphia, leaving both the Raiders and Chargers at 8–4.

==== Week 13: vs. Philadelphia Eagles ====
Week Thirteen: Philadelphia Eagles at San Diego Chargers – Game summary

Quarter	1	2	3	4	Total
Eagles	0	0	7	14	**21**
**Chargers**	9	10	0	3	**22**

at Jack Murphy Stadium, San Diego, California

- Date: November 30
- Game time: 1:00 p.m. PST
- Game weather: 61 °F (16.1 °C), relative humidity 81%, wind 6 miles per hour (9.7 km/h; 5.2 kn)
- Game attendance: 51,567
- Referee: Chuck Heberling
- TV announcers (CBS): Curt Gowdy and Hank Stram
- Box score

Game information

**First quarter**

- SDG – Kellen Winslow 14-yard pass from Dan Fouts (kick blocked), 13:57. Chargers 6–0. **Drive: 3 plays, 66 yards, 1:03.**
- SDG – Rolf Benirschke 34-yard field goal, 5:34. Chargers 9–0. **Drive: 11 plays, 64 yards, 5:09.**

**Second quarter**

- SDG – Kellen Winslow 17-yard pass from Dan Fouts (Rolf Benirschke kick), 8:11. Chargers 16–0. **Drive: 4 plays, 71 yards, 0:57.**
- SDG – Rolf Benirschke 45-yard field goal, 0:01. Chargers 19–0. **Drive: 4 plays, 34 yards, 0:34.**

**Third quarter**

- PHI – Wilbert Montgomery 1-yard run (Tony Franklin kick), 6:53. Chargers 19–7. **Drive: 5 plays, 80 yards, 8:07.**

**Fourth quarter**

- SDG – Rolf Benirschke 42-yard field goal, 7:15. Chargers 22–7. **Drive: 9 plays, 46 yards, 4:06.**
- PHI – Keith Krepfle 16-yard pass from Ron Jaworski (Tony Franklin kick), 11:02. Chargers 22–14. **Drive: 1 play, 16 yards, 0:05.**
- PHI – Wilbert Montgomery 11-yard pass from Ron Jaworski (Tony Franklin kick), 2:50. Chargers 22–21. **Drive: 10 plays, 58 yards, 6:00.**

**Top passers**

- PHI – Ron Jaworski – 20/31, 201 yards, 2 TD
- SDG – Dan Fouts – 20/28, 342 yards, 2 TD

**Top rushers**

- PHI – Wilbert Montgomery – 18 rushes, 61 yards, TD
- SDG – Mike Thomas – 13 rushes, 45 yards

**Top receivers**

- PHI – Wilbert Montgomery – 11 receptions, 78 yards, TD
  PHI – Keith Krepfle – 5 receptions, 78 yards, TD
- SDG – John Jefferson – 8 receptions, 164 yards

Philadelphia entered the game with a league-best 11–1 record and an eight-game winning streak. Fouts found Jefferson along the right sideline for 50 yards on the game's first play, and Winslow scored a 14-yard touchdown two plays later. San Diego also scored on their second drive, five more completions from Fouts accounting for 58 out of 64 yards gained before Benirschke made a field goal. The Eagles wasted two drives into Chargers territory: Tony Franklin missed a 49-yard field goal and Ron Jaworski mishandled a snap that Kelcher recovered. Midway through the 2nd quarter Fouts hit Joiner for 51 yards along the left sideline. As before, Winslow capitalized two plays later, this time from 17 yards out. Franklin missed two further field goal, Benirschke made one, and it was 19–0 at the break.

On the first possession of the 3rd quarter, Philadelphia fooled the Chargers with a fake punt, and ultimately drove 80 yards in 15 plays for a touchdown. San Diego reached the red zone in response, but Mike Thomas threw an interception on a trick play. However, they did add another field goal on their next drive, and then forced a punt, leaving them with both possession of the ball and a 15-point lead with 11:13 to play. Muncie fumbled on the next play, and Jaworski threw a touchdown the play after that. San Diego then went three-and-out, and the Eagles finished a six-minute drive with another Jaworski touchdown pass. Taking over at their own 7-yard line with 2:41 to play, San Diego had only to gain a single first down with a Fouts-to-Winslow completion, and could then run the clock out.

Johnson had three of the Chargers' six sacks. The Eagles came into the game with the league's top-ranked pass defense giving up 172.6 yards per game; Fouts passed for 342 yards, while being sacked twice for the loss of 12 yards.

==== Week 14: at Washington Redskins ====
Week Fourteen: San Diego Chargers at Washington Redskins – Game summary

Quarter	1	2	3	4	Total
Chargers	7	3	0	7	**17**
**Redskins**	14	6	6	14	**40**

at Robert F. Kennedy Memorial Stadium, Washington, D.C.

- Date: December 7
- Game time: 1:00 p.m. EST
- Game weather: 54 °F (12.2 °C), relative humidity 65%, wind 7 miles per hour (11 km/h; 6.1 kn)
- Game attendance: 48,556
- Referee: Bob Frederic
- TV announcers (NBC): Charlie Jones and Len Dawson
- Box score

Game information

**First quarter**

- WAS – Joe Lavender 51-yard interception return (Mark Moseley kick). Redskins 7–0.
- WAS – Wilbur Jackson 18-yard pass from Joe Theismann (Mark Moseley kick). Redskins 14–0.
- SDG – Greg McCrary 28-yard pass from Dan Fouts (Rolf Benirschke kick). Redskins 14–7.

**Second quarter**

- WAS – Mark Moseley 28-yard field goal. Redskins 17–7.
- SDG – Rolf Benirschke 26-yard field goal. Redskins 17–10.
- WAS – Mark Moseley 45-yard field goal. Redskins 20–10.

**Third quarter**

- WAS – Mark Moseley 46-yard field goal. Redskins 23–10.
- WAS – Mark Moseley 46-yard field goal. Redskins 26–10.

**Fourth quarter**

- SDG – Hank Bauer 2-yard run (Rolf Benirschke kick). Redskins 26–17.
- WAS – Ike Forte 4-yard pass from Joe Theismann (Mark Moseley kick). Redskins 33–17.
- WAS – Ike Forte 3-yard run (Mark Moseley kick). Redskins 40–17.

**Top passers**

- SDG – Dan Fouts – 13/25, 200 yards, TD, 4 INT
- WAS – Joe Theismann – 26/37, 269 yards, 2 TD

**Top rushers**

- SDG – Chuck Muncie – 12 rushes, 52 yards
- WAS – Clarence Harmon – 11 rushes, 71 yards

**Top receivers**

- SDG – Greg McCrary – 2 receptions, 56 yards, TD
- WAS – Clarence Harmon – 12 receptions, 118 yards

On the first San Diego possession, Joe Lavender cut in front of Winslow to make the first of his three interceptions on the day; Lavender ran the ball back 51 yards for the touchdown that put Washington ahead to stay. It was soon 14–0, but Greg McCrary caught a 28-yard touchdown reception in response, and the Chargers trailed by a manageable 20–10 at halftime. On the opening possession of the second half, San Diego drove from their 10 to the Washington 4-yard line, with Winslow catching a 42-yard pass. However, Fouts threw his fourth interception of the game and the chance was wasted. Washington added two more field goals before Hank Bauer scored his only touchdown of the season, making it 26–17 with over fourteen minutes to play. The Charger defense then appeared to have made a red zone stop, but Young jumped offside on a field goal attempt, and Washington scored the crucial touchdown a play later. Muncie fumbled the ensuing kickoff to set up the game's final touchdown.

San Diego committed seven of the game's ten turnovers. Despite the surprising loss to a 3–10 team, San Diego remained tied atop the AFC West, as Oakland lost to Dallas later in the day.

==== Week 15: vs. Seattle Seahawks ====
Week Fifteen: Seattle Seahawks at San Diego Chargers – Game summary

Quarter	1	2	3	4	Total
Seahawks	0	0	7	7	**14**
**Chargers**	0	21	0	0	**21**

at Jack Murphy Stadium, San Diego, California

- Date: December 13
- Game time: 1:00 p.m. PST
- Game weather: 60 °F (15.6 °C), relative humidity 48%, wind 6 miles per hour (9.7 km/h; 5.2 kn)
- Game attendance: 49,980
- Referee: Red Cashion
- TV announcers (NBC): Charlie Jones and Len Dawson
- Box score

Game information

**First quarter**

- No scoring plays

**Second quarter**

- SDG – Chuck Muncie 1-yard run (Rolf Benirschke kick), 14:58. Chargers 7–0. **Drive: 10 plays, 71 yards, 4:19.**
- SDG – Chuck Muncie 10-yard run (Rolf Benirschke kick), 6:21. Chargers 14–0. **Drive: 9 plays, 48 yards, 4:43.**
- SDG – John Jefferson 19-yard pass from Dan Fouts (Rolf Benirschke kick), 1:53. Chargers 21–0. **Drive: 6 plays, 45 yards, 2:41.**

**Third quarter**

- SEA – Jim Jodat 15-yard run (Efren Herrera kick), 3:30. Chargers 21–7. **Drive: 15 plays, 75 yards, 5:16.**

**Fourth quarter**

- SEA – Steve Largent 2-yard pass from Jim Zorn (Efren Herrera kick), 0:00. Chargers 21–14. **Drive: 6 plays, 80 yards, 1:09.**

**Top passers**

- SEA – Ron Jaworski – 22/42, 179 yards, TD
- SDG – Dan Fouts – 28/42, 339 yards, TD, 2 INT

**Top rushers**

- SEA – Dan Doornink – 6 rushes, 36 yards
  SEA – Jim Jodat – 7 rushes, 36 yards, TD
- SDG – Chuck Muncie – 13 rushes, 42 yards, 2 TD
  SDG – Mike Thomas – 11 rushes, 42 yards

**Top receivers**

- SEA – Steve Largent – 5 receptions, 55 yards, TD
- SDG – John Jefferson – 8 receptions, 113 yards, TD

Points differential was significant coming into this game – if San Diego and Oakland both won their remaining two games, divisional net points would decide the division winner. There, the Chargers had a 19-point advantage, and both teams would play their final divisional games in Week 15.

Fouts completed his first five passes as San Diego drove from their own 23-yard line to the Seattle 6, but his sixth attempt was intercepted in the end zone. The Charger scored on their next drive, which featured a 29-yard catch from Joiner and Muncie's touchdown on 3rd and goal from the 1. Johnson recovered a fumble at the Seattle 38-yard line soon afterwards, but Muncie fumbled himself after the Chargers had driven inside the 10. Seattle went three-and-out on their next two drives, and San Diego increased their lead with further touchdowns for Muncie and Jefferson. Overall, San Diego gained 18 first downs to Seattle's 5 in the first half, while building a 21–0 lead.

The Chargers were less effective in the 3rd quarter, gaining only a single first down in three possessions, and allowing Seattle to convert a 4th and 4 during a long touchdown drive. The Seahawks went three-and-out on their next two possessions; after the second of these, San Diego made sure of the win with a 15-play, 86-yard drive that took nine minutes off the clock and ended with Benirschke missing from 23 yards out with 1:09 to play. Seattle added a second touchdown as time expired.

DeJurnett had 2 1/2 of the Chargers' 3 sacks. The reduced margin of victory proved not to matter, as Oakland could only beat Denver by three points the following day, leaving San Diego top of the AFC West on the tiebreakers.

==== Week 16: vs. Pittsburgh Steelers ====
Week Sixteen: Pittsburgh Steelers at San Diego Chargers – Game summary

Quarter	1	2	3	4	Total
Steelers	0	3	7	7	**17**
**Chargers**	3	6	10	7	**26**

at Jack Murphy Stadium, San Diego, California

- Date: December 22
- Game time: 6:00 p.m. PST
- Game weather: 57 °F (13.9 °C), relative humidity 87%, wind 7 miles per hour (11 km/h; 6.1 kn)
- Game attendance: 51,785
- Referee: Jim Tunney
- TV announcers (ABC): Frank Gifford, Don Meredith and Howard Cosell
- Box score

Game information

**First quarter**

- SDG – Rolf Benirschke 33-yard field goal, 3:01. Chargers 3–0. **Drive: 14 plays, 66 yards, 6:27.**

**Second quarter**

- PIT – Matt Bahr 33-yard field goal, 12:47. Tied 3–3. **Drive: 11 plays, 60 yards, 5:04.**
- SDG – Rolf Benirschke 26-yard field goal, 7:16. Chargers 6–3. **Drive: 12 plays, 81 yards, 5:21.**
- SDG – Rolf Benirschke 26-yard field goal, 0:02. Chargers 9–3. **Drive: 13 plays, 74 yards, 6:11.**

**Third quarter**

- SDG – Dan Fouts 1-yard run (Rolf Benirschke kick), 11:32. Chargers 16–3. **Drive: 8 plays, 82 yards, 3:28.**
- PIT – Sidney Thornton 2-yard run (Matt Bahr kick), 8:14. Chargers 16–10. **Drive: 6 plays, 65 yards, 3:09.**
- SDG – Rolf Benirschke 33-yard field goal, 3:33. Chargers 19–10. **Drive: 12 plays, 59 yards, 4:31.**

**Fourth quarter**

- SDG – Chuck Muncie 10-yard run (Rolf Benirschke kick), 3:22. Chargers 26–10. **Drive: 10 plays, 64 yards, 5:14.**
- PIT – Bennie Cunningham 16-yard pass from Terry Bradshaw (Matt Bahr kick), 0:00. Chargers 26–17. **Drive: 9 plays, 52 yards, 1:38.**

**Top passers**

- PIT – Terry Bradshaw – 16/32, 272 yards, TD
- SDG – Dan Fouts – 21/37, 308 yards

**Top rushers**

- PIT – Franco Harris – 9 rushes, 30 yards
- SDG – Chuck Muncie – 26 rushes, 115 yards, TD

**Top receivers**

- PIT – Theo Bell – 5 receptions, 127 yards
- SDG – Kellen Winslow – 10 receptions, 171 yards

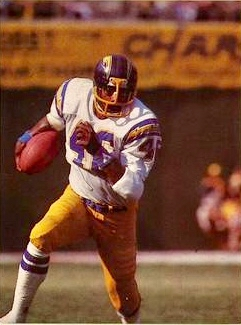
Mid-season acquisition Chuck Muncie rushed for a season-high 115 yards in the regular season finale.

This was the final Monday Night Football game of the season, so the Chargers knew the stakes beforehand – a win would make them AFC West champions and the No. 1 seed in the conference, but a loss would see them miss the playoffs entirely.

San Diego gained substantial yardage in the first half; they had three drives, covering 66, 81 and 74 yards. However, they stalled in the red zone each time, settling for three Benirschke field goals and a 9–3 halftime lead. On the opening play of the second half, Fouts found Winslow open along the left sideline for a 59-yard gain. Jefferson converted a 3rd and 6 with a 14-yard catch before Muncie was ruled just short of the end zone on 3rd and goal from the 1. The Chargers opted to go for it, and Fouts comfortably scored the game's opening touchdown with a quarterback sneak. The Steelers needed barely three minutes to respond with Sidney Thornton's touchdown, before San Diego converted three 3rd downs but failed on a fourth, leading to another field goal. The defense then made a stop when Terry Bradshaw threw incomplete on 4th and 3 from the Chargers 20-yard line, with Lowe on the coverage. After an exchange of punts, San Diego drove for the clinching touchdown, Muncie converting one 3rd and 4 with a 6-yard catch and another with his 10-yard touchdown run around left end.

Muncie's 115 rushing yards were a season high; he also had 27 receiving yards. While the Chargers had committed a league-high 48 turnovers and forced 38 through their defense, this game was turnover-free.

=== Standings ===
AFC West
	W	L	T	PCT	DIV	CONF	PF	PA	STK
^{(1)} San Diego Chargers	11	5	0	.688	6–2	9–3	418	327	W2
^{(4)} Oakland Raiders	11	5	0	.688	6–2	9–3	364	306	W2
Kansas City Chiefs	8	8	0	.500	4–4	6–8	319	336	W1
Denver Broncos	8	8	0	.500	3–5	5–7	310	323	W1
Seattle Seahawks	4	12	0	.250	1–7	3–9	291	408	L9

== Postseason ==
Round	Date	Opponent (seed)	Result	Record	Venue	Attendance	Recap
Divisional	January 3, 1981	Buffalo Bills (3)	W 20–14	1–0	Jack Murphy Stadium	52,028	Recap
AFC Championship	January 11, 1981	Oakland Raiders (4)	L 27–34	1–1	Jack Murphy Stadium	52,428	Recap

=== Game summaries ===
==== AFC Divisional Playoffs: vs. Buffalo Bills ====
AFC Divisional Playoffs: (#3) Buffalo Bills at (#1) San Diego Chargers – Game summary

Quarter	1	2	3	4	Total
Bills	0	14	0	0	14
Chargers	3	0	7	10	20

at Jack Murphy Stadium, San Diego, California

- Date: January 3
- Game time: 1:00 p.m. PST
- Game weather: 65 °F (18.3 °C), sunny
- Game attendance: 52,028
- Referee: Gene Barth
- TV announcers (NBC): Dick Enberg and Merlin Olsen
- Box score

Game information

First quarter

- SDG – Rolf Benirschke 22-yard field goal, 3:44. Chargers 3–0. Drive: 12 plays, 69 yards, 6:45.

Second quarter

- BUF – Roosevelt Leaks 1-yard run (Nick Mike-Mayer kick), 14:16. Bills 7–3. Drive: 12 plays, 72 yards, 4:20.
- BUF – Frank Lewis 9-yard pass from Joe Ferguson (Nick Mike-Mayer kick), 0:16. Bills 14–3. Drive: 4 plays, 33 yards, 1:32.

Third quarter

- SDG – Charlie Joiner 9-yard pass from Dan Fouts (Rolf Benirschke kick), 13:26. Bills 14–10. Drive: 4 plays, 70 yards, 1:34.

Fourth quarter

- SDG – Rolf Benirschke 22-yard field goal, 14:09. Bills 14–13. Drive: 8 plays, 45 yards, 4:13.
- SDG – Ron Smith 50-yard pass from Dan Fouts (Rolf Benirschke kick), 2:08. Chargers 20–14. Drive: 5 plays, 69 yards, 1:50.

Top passers

- BUF – Joe Ferguson – 15/29, 180 yards, TD, 3 INT
- SDG – Dan Fouts – 22/37, 314 yards, 2 TD, INT

Top rushers

- BUF – Joe Cribbs – 18 rushes, 53 yards
- SDG – Chuck Muncie – 18 rushes, 80 yards

Top receivers

- BUF – Mark Brammer – 4 receptions, 62 yards
- SDG – John Jefferson – 7 receptions, 102 yards

The first two drives of the game ended with field goal attempts: Buffalo kicker Nick Mike-Mayer struck the upright from 44 yards, while Benirschke was successful from 22. The Bills then converted three 3rd downs while driving 72 yards to take the lead. Benirschke missed from 43 yards out, and the teams exchanged punts for the next five drives. On the first play after the two-minute warning, Joiner fumbled and Buffalo recovered at the San Diego 33-yard line. Four plays later, Ferguson's touchdown pass gave Buffalo a 14–3 halftime lead.

Muncie ran up the middle for 18 yards on the first play of the second half, and Fouts followed with a play action fake to Muncie and a 45-yard completion to Joiner. After Muncie lost two yards, Fouts and Joiner connected for the Chargers' first touchdown of the day. Partridge had a punt blocked soon afterwards, setting the Bills up at the Charger 38-yard line. They reached a 3rd and 7 at the 24 before Ferguson was intercepted by Edwards. On the next Buffalo possession, Dean sacked Ferguson at his own 16, leading to a punt that Fuller returned to the Buffalo 49-yard line. San Diego progressed to a 2nd and goal from the 1, but were pushed back 5 yards by an illegal motion penalty on Muncie and settled for a field goal. Fuller intercepted Ferguson with eleven minutes to play, returning the ball to the Chargers 49-yard line. A 24-yard Jefferson catch moved San Diego into Buffalo territory, but Fouts was intercepted after his overthrown pass glanced off Ron Smith's fingertips inside the 10. Jones sacked Ferguson on the ensuing drive, leading to a punt that Fuller fumbled and Buffalo recovered at the Chargers 38-yard line. The San Diego defense was able to stop Joe Cribbs for the loss of a yard on 3rd and 1, and Mike-Mayer was short on a 49-yard field goal attempt. San Diego reached a 3rd and 10 at midfield, from where Fouts found Smith in stride over the middle at the Buffalo 25-yard line en route to a 50-yard game-winning touchdown with 2:08 to play. The Bills reached their own 48-yard line before Edwards intercepted Ferguson and San Diego ran the clock out.

Smith had caught 4 passes for 48 yards and no touchdowns during the regular season; he had three postseason touchdowns and only one regular season touchdown at this point in his career. Muncie had 80 rushing yards and 53 receiving yards on the day. It was the Chargers' first playoff win since the 1963 AFL Championship Game. Chargers go to the AFC Championship Game but lost to the eventual Super Bowl Champion Raiders 34-27.

==== AFC Conference Championship: vs. Oakland Raiders ====
AFC Conference Championship: (#4) Oakland Raiders at (#1) San Diego Chargers – Game summary

Quarter	1	2	3	4	Total
Raiders	21	7	3	3	34
Chargers	7	7	10	3	27

at Jack Murphy Stadium, San Diego, California

- Date: January 11
- Game time: 4:00 p.m. EST
- Game weather: 71 °F (21.7 °C), mostly cloudy
- Game attendance: 52,428
- Referee: Cal Lepore
- TV announcers (NBC): Dick Enberg and Merlin Olsen

Game information

First quarter

- OAK – Raymond Chester 65-yard pass from Jim Plunkett (Chris Bahr kick), 13:25. Raiders 7–0. Drive: 3 plays, 71 yards, 1:35.
- SDG – Charlie Joiner 48-yard pass from Dan Fouts (Rolf Benirschke kick), 7:56. Tied 7–7. Drive: 3 plays, 62 yards, 1:21.
- OAK – Jim Plunkett 5-yard run (Chris Bahr kick), 3:46. Raiders 14–7. Drive: 7 plays, 76 yards, 4:00.
- OAK – Kenny King 21-yard pass from Jim Plunkett (Chris Bahr kick), 1:35. Raiders 21–7. Drive: 4 plays, 49 yards, 1:33.

Second quarter

- OAK – Mark van Eeghen 3-yard run (Chris Bahr kick), 6:26. Raiders 28–7. Drive: 7 plays, 29 yards, 3:31.
- SDG – Charlie Joiner 8-yard pass from Dan Fouts (Rolf Benirschke kick), 1:05. Raiders 28–14. Drive: 13 plays, 64 yards, 5:00.

Third quarter

- SDG – Rolf Benirschke 26-yard field goal, 10:26. Raiders 28–17. Drive: 12 plays, 68 yards, 4:34.
- SDG – Chuck Muncie 6-yard run (Rolf Benirschke kick), 6:13. Raiders 28–24. Drive: 6 plays, 41 yards, 2:29.
- OAK – Chris Bahr 27-yard field goal, 0:49. Raiders 31–24. Drive: 9 plays, 68 yards, 5:15.

Fourth quarter

- OAK – Chris Bahr 33-yard field goal, 9:46. Raiders 34–24. Drive: 10 plays, 37 yards, 5:54.
- SDG – Rolf Benirschke 27-yard field goal, 6:52. Raiders 34–27. Drive: 12 plays, 72 yards, 2:48.

Top passers

- OAK – Jim Plunkett – 14/18, 261 yards, 2 TD
- SDG – Dan Fouts – 22/45, 336 yards, 2 TD, 2 INT

Top rushers

- OAK – Mark van Eeghen – 20 rushes, 85 yards, TD
- SDG – Mike Thomas – 12 rushes, 48 yards

Top receivers

- OAK – Raymond Chester – 5 receptions, 102 yards, TD
- SDG – Charlie Joiner – 6 receptions, 130 yards, 2 TD

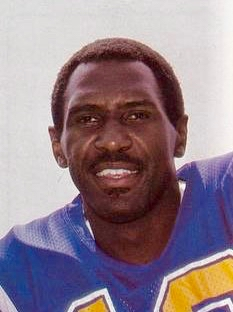
Charlie Joiner led the Chargers in receptions, yards receiving, and touchdowns in the AFC Championship Game.

Three plays into the game, Jim Plunkett's 3rd-down pass deflected off his intended receiver Kenny King and was caught instead by Raymond Chester, who broke away to complete a 65-yard touchdown. On the Chargers' first play from scrimmage, Fouts found Smith up the right sideline for 55 yards. He followed up with a 14-yard completion to Jefferson on 3rd and 13, but was intercepted two plays later by Lester Hayes when Jefferson fell down on the slick field. San Diego's defense quickly forced a punt when Johnson sacked Plunkett on 3rd down. The offense tied the score three plays later; from the Raiders 48-yard line, Fouts threw to Joiner in the end zone, who made the catch despite being double covered. Oakland scored touchdowns on their next two possessions either side of a Chargers three-and-out. Fouts completed a pass of 20 yards to Joiner and Winslow threw 28 yards to Jefferson on a trick play as San Diego moved inside the Raiders 20-yard line, but Fouts was intercepted again when Jefferson couldn't hold onto his pass inside the 10. Thomas fumbled the next time San Diego had the ball, with Oakland recovering at the Charger 29-yard line, leading to the fourth Raiders touchdown. Thomas fumbled again on the next drive, but Doug Wilkerson recovered. On the next play, Thomas converted a 3rd and 9 with a 24-yard catch to the Oakland 7-yard line. Two plays lost one yard, then Joiner caught Fouts' pass at the 5 and dove over the goal line for a touchdown, reducing the halftime deficit to 28–14.

Joiner's 25-yard catch on 3rd and 18 kept San Diego's first drive of the second half going. They reached 1st and goal from the 8 before Fouts threw incomplete for Jefferson on three consecutive plays, the second of which was an end zone drop where Jefferson had both hands on the ball. The Chargers took a field goal, then a Jones sack on 3rd down forced a punt that Fuller returned 28 yards to the Raiders 41-yard line. From there, Fouts completed 3 of 3 passes for 35 yards, and Muncie scored from the 6-yard line. Oakland extended their lead with a field goal, then forced a three-and-out. They drove to a 3rd and goal from the 3 before Lowe sacked Plunkett and forced the Raiders to settle for another field goal. Joiner and Winslow had 3rd down conversions as San Diego answered with a field goal and reduced the deficit to seven points with 6:43 still to play. Oakland ran all of that time off, converting three 3rd downs on a 14-play drive.

Five different Chargers combined for 6 sacks of Plunkett. San Diego outgained the Raiders by 434 yards to 362, but committed all three of the game's turnovers. Joiner led San Diego with six catches for 130 yards and two touchdowns. Chargers lost and in 1981 finished 10-6. Won to the Miami Dolphins 41-38. But lost in the AFC Championship Game to the Bengals 27-7.

== Awards ==
Eight Chargers were named to the 1981 Pro Bowl, and eight were named All-Pros by the Associated Press, including five on the 1st team. Also, Fouts received 3 of the 80 available votes as NFL MVP; in the Offensive Player of the Year voting, Fouts and Jefferson received 7 and 6 votes respectively.

Player	Position	Pro Bowl starter	Pro Bowl reserve	AP 1st team All-Pro	AP 2nd team All-Pro	NEA 1st team All-Pro	NEA 2nd team All-Pro
Rolf Benirschke	Kicker				Yes		
Fred Dean	Defensive end	Yes		Yes			
Dan Fouts	Quarterback		Yes		Yes		
John Jefferson	Wide receiver	Yes		Yes		Yes	
Gary Johnson	Defensive tackle	Yes		Yes		Yes	
Charlie Joiner	Wide receiver	Yes		Yes			
Louie Kelcher	Defensive tackle	Yes			Yes		
Doug Wilkerson	Guard		Yes				Yes
Kellen Winslow	Tight end	Yes		Yes		Yes	
