= Jerry Smith (American football, born 1930) =

American football player and coach (1930–2011)

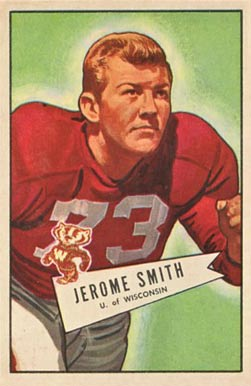
- Smith on 1952 Bowman football card

No. 69, 61
- Positions: Guard, linebacker

Personal information
- Born: September 9, 1930; Dayton, Ohio, U.S.
- Died: August 6, 2011 (aged 80); San Diego, California, U.S.
- Listed height: 6 ft 1 in (1.85 m)
- Listed weight: 230 lb (104 kg)

Career information
- High school: Chaminade-Julienne (Dayton)
- College: Wisconsin (1949–1951)
- NFL draft: 1952: 8th round, 94th overall pick

Career history

Playing
- San Francisco 49ers (1952–1953, 1956); Green Bay Packers (1956)

Coaching
- Dayton (1959) Assistant coach; Boston Patriots (1960-1961) Assistant coach; Buffalo Bills (1962–1967) Assistant coach; New Orleans Saints (1969–1970) Assistant coach; Denver Broncos (1971) Offensive Line / Interim head coach; Houston Oilers (1972) Defensive line coach; Cleveland Browns (1973) Offensive Line coach; Baltimore Colts (1974–1976) Defensive Line coach; San Diego Chargers (1977–1983) Defensive line coach; St. Louis Cardinals (1985) Special teams coach

Awards and highlights
- First-team All-Big Ten (1951)

Career NFL statistics
- Games played: 29
- Games started: 21
- Fumble recoveries: 5
- Stats at Pro Football Reference

Head coaching record
- Regular season: 2–3 (.400)
- Coaching profile at Pro Football Reference

Jerome Anthony Smith (September 9, 1930 – August 6, 2011) was an American professional football player and coach.

== Early life ==
Jerry was born in Dayton, Ohio and attended Chaminade High School, graduating in 1948. At Chaminade he played tight end and later in 1982 was elected to the school's Athletic Hall of Fame.

== Career ==
After Smith's college football career, which he spent at Wisconsin, the San Francisco 49ers of the National Football League (NFL) selected Smith in the eighth round of the 1952 NFL draft. He played at left guard for the team in 1952 and 1953. In 1956, he split time between the 49ers and Green Bay Packers. Smith played in 29 games during his NFL career.

Beginning in 1960, he joined the Boston Patriots as a coach of the team's defensive linemen and linebackers. Two years later, he took a similar role with the Buffalo Bills; in his six years as a Bills coach, the team won two American Football League championships. In 1968, the Cleveland Browns hired Smith as an assistant personnel director. From 1969 to 1970, Smith coached in the New Orleans Saints organization. The following year, he became the Denver Broncos' offensive line coach. On November 17, 1971, Broncos head coach Lou Saban, who had also been Smith's boss in Boston and Buffalo, resigned and Smith was named his replacement for the season's last five games. The Broncos posted a 2–3 record under Smith. Following the 1971 season, he became the Houston Oilers' defensive line coach for 1972; after one season, he returned to the Browns and served multiple roles. He coached the San Diego Chargers' defensive line from 1977 through 1983. He received credit for developing the front four of Fred Dean, Leroy Jones, Louie Kelcher, and Gary "Big Hands" Johnson. Known as the Bruise Brothers, the group helped the Chargers lead the NFL in 1980 with 60 sacks. Dean, Kelcher, and Johnson all started in the 1981 Pro Bowl.

== Death ==
Smith's health declined after suffering a heart attack in 2007. He died at age 80 on August 6, 2011.
