= List of Norfolk State Spartans in the NFL draft =

This is a list of Norfolk State Spartans football players in the NFL draft.

== Key ==
B	Back	K	Kicker	NT	Nose tackle
C	Center	LB	Linebacker	FB	Fullback
DB	Defensive back	P	Punter	HB	Halfback
DE	Defensive end	QB	Quarterback	WR	Wide receiver
DT	Defensive tackle	RB	Running back	G	Guard
E	End	T	Offensive tackle	TE	Tight end

== Selections ==
Year	Round	Pick	Overall	Player	Team	Position
1964	19	13	265	John Baker	Green Bay Packers	E
1966	14	6	206	Lewis Turner	Dallas Cowboys	RB
1968	14	15	369	Alex Moore	San Francisco 49ers	RB
1969	3	18	70	Gene Ferguson	San Diego Chargers	T
1970	5	15	119	Pettus Farrar	San Diego Chargers	RB
1971	5	7	111	Ray Jarvis	Atlanta Falcons	WR
1971	15	9	373	Larry James	Denver Broncos	RB
1972	5	20	124	Ron Bolton	New England Patriots	DB
1973	15	4	368	Condie Pugh	New England Patriots	RB
1973	16	26	416	James Jackson	Miami Dolphins	DE
1975	2	22	48	Leroy Jones	Los Angeles Rams	DE
1979	6	9	149	Ricky Ray	New Orleans Saints	DB
1980	3	7	63	Earl Jones	Atlanta Falcons	DB
1980	6	13	151	LaRue Harrington	San Diego Chargers	RB
1983	9	10	234	George Parker	Buffalo Bills	RB
1985	9	1	225	Glenn Jones	Buffalo Bills	DB
1990	8	4	197	Arthur Jimerson	Los Angeles Raiders	LB
1996	5	25	157	Kenneth McDaniel	Dallas Cowboys	G
1996	6	19	186	James Roe	Baltimore Ravens	WR
2009	6	4	177	Don Carey	Cleveland Browns	DB
