= Wilbur Young =

American football player (1949–2014)

No. 99
- Position: Defensive tackle/end

Personal information
- Born: April 20, 1949; New York City, New York, U.S.
- Died: July 5, 2014 (aged 65); Charlottesville, Virginia, U.S.
- Listed height: 6 ft 6 in (1.98 m)
- Listed weight: 285 lb (129 kg)

Career information
- High school: James Monroe (New York City, New York)
- College: William Penn (1967–1970)
- NFL draft: 1971: 2nd round, 39th overall pick

Career history
- Kansas City Chiefs (1971–1977); San Diego Chargers (1978–1981); Washington Redskins (1981); San Diego Chargers (1982); Arizona Wranglers (1984)

Career NFL statistics
- Games played: 153
- Games started: 98
- Interceptions: 2
- Touchdowns: 2
- Fumble recoveries: 11
- Stats at Pro Football Reference

Wilbur Eugene Young, Jr. (April 20, 1949 – July 5, 2014) was an American professional football player who was a defensive lineman in the National Football League (NFL) for the Kansas City Chiefs, San Diego Chargers, and Washington Redskins. He also played for the Arizona Wranglers of the United States Football League (USFL). He once blocked two field goal attempts in the same NFL game. In 1979, he had 14 quarterback sacks, and was named All-American Football Conference (AFC) by United Press International. In 1975, he had four sacks in a single game.

== Early life ==
Young was born on April 20, 1949, in New York City, New York, to Wilbur and Helen Young. Young had two sisters. His father was a postal worker. Young was raised in the Castle Hills projects in the Southeast Bronx. He originally attended Samuel Gompers High School, but transferred as a junior to James Monroe High School in the Bronx. Unlike Gompers, Monroe had a football program.

Young was new to organized football, and did not have a good year on Monroe's football team, which only won a single game that season. However, as a 310 lb (140.6 kg) senior the following year, the team had a 5–2–1 record and Young was named all-conference.

== College career ==
Young came to the attention of the football program at William Penn College (now William Penn University) in Osakaloosa, Iowa, when a high school teammate sent William Penn's coaches film of a Monroe game in an effort to get himself a scholarship at William Penn. The coaches became interested in Young after seeing film of his playing in that game, and offered Young a scholarship to attend Willima Penn. The only other school actively trying to recruit Young was Hillsdale College in Michigan. Young accepted the scholarship offer and played college football at William Penn. He was one of approximately 30 black students among 900 students at William Penn. William Penn became the first place where Young associated with whites on any regular basis. He studied physical education and psychology, and graduated from William Penn in May 1971 with a Bachelor's degree in Physical Education.

Young began learning how to play football properly at William Penn. He was named a first-team All-Iowa Intercollegiate Athletic Conference (IIAC; Iowa Conference) defensive lineman as a freshman. Young also started learning how to keep his weight down while at William Penn. He weighed 350 lb (158.8 kg) during his sophomore season and missed a game with a foot injury. This was the only season he was not on an All-IIAC team. After his sophomore season, Young had ankle surgery to remove a bone chip, and reduced his weight below 320 lb (145.1 kg) while convalescing. Overall, he lost 50 pounds between his sophomore and junior seasons. During his junior season, he was reported to be 6 ft 7 in (2.01 m) 300 lb (136.1 kg).

Opposing teams chose to run to the opposite side of the defensive line during his junior season (1969), away from Young. He forced two fumbles during the opening game of his senior season (1970). In an early October 1970 game, he blocked a punt that resulted in a safety.

While attending William Penn, he was a two-time first-team All-IIAC defensive tackle (1967 and 1970), and was named second-team All-IIAC in 1969. In 1969 and 1970, he was named a National Association of Intercollegiate Athletics (NAIA) All-American at defensive tackle. In 1970, Young was named a second-team NAIA All-American at defensive tackle. In 1970, the Associated Press named Young an honorable mention Little All-American. As a senior, Young was invited to play in the Chicago College All-Star Game against the Baltimore Colts.

In addition to football, he also lettered and set a school record in the shot put for the track and field program. He set Iowa Conference shot put records in 1968 and 1970, and won the conference shot put title three times from 1968 to 1970.

Young was inducted into the William Penn Athletics Hall of Fame's inaugural class in 1985, and was selected for induction into the NAIA Hall of Fame in 2002 and inducted in January 2003.

== Professional career ==
=== NFL ===
==== Kansas City Chiefs ====
Professional football teams were scouting Young as early as his freshman year in college. Young came out of college able to run the 40-yard dash in 5.0 seconds. He was drafted in the second round (39th overall) of the 1971 NFL draft by the Kansas City Chiefs, where he played from 1971 to 1977. In February 1971, a scout described him as having "unlimited potential". During his career, he was among the biggest players in the NFL.

Young played under Chiefs' future Hall of Fame head coach Hank Stram. As a rookie, Stram told Young he had to come into July training camp at 290 lb (131.5 kg), and Young made the weight. In 1971, he started one game at defensive end, of the 13 games in which he appeared, with 2.5 quarterback sacks and an interception. As a second year player (1972), he was listed at 6 ft 6 in (1.98 m) 285 lb (129.3 kg). Young got an opportunity to start at right defensive end that year when starter Aaron Brown was injured during the preseason. Young started seven games that season, with three quarterback sacks.

By 1973, Young was a full-time starter at right defensive end. He had 7.5 sacks that season and one fumble recovery. On the Chiefs, he was behind only future Hall of Fame defensive tackle Curley Culp (nine) and tied with future Hall of Fame defensive tackle Buck Buchanan for the team lead in sacks that season. He has also been reported as having eight sacks that season. In an October 14 game against the Green Bay Packers, Young blocked two Chester Marcol field goal attempts. The first block put the Chiefs in a position to score their only touchdown of the game.

In 1974, Young started all 14 games at right end, with 6.5 sacks. He returned an interception 52 yards for a touchdown in a September 22 game against the Oakland Raiders; the first touchdown of his career. A week earlier, he blocked an extra point attempt in a game against the New York Jets.

In 1975, Young led the Chiefs with a team-high 12.5 sacks in 12 starts; 10th most in the NFL that season. He also had one fumble recovery. Young had four quarterback sacks in a mid-October 1975 game against the San Diego Chargers. Chiefs' head coach Paul Wiggins, a former defensive end with the Cleveland Browns, called Young's performance "one of the best games a defensive end ever played". Young's play was limited that year by a knee injury during the season, and by chronically sore feet which plagued him during his career. Because of a number of injuries on the Chiefs, coach Wiggins played Young in a game that Young should have been sitting out.

During the 1975 season, Young was taken out of a game against the New York Jets (in his hometown) for jumping offside more than once. This led to some ill feelings between him and the team, to the degree that he had to state publicly he was not asking to be traded before the 1976 season. He did express concern, however, about "penny-ante" practices by the Chiefs and that the team was attempting to release its older black players, that might make him want to ask for a trade in the future if that continued. Coach Wiggins said he had agonized over releasing some of his veteran black players, but this was not motivated by any prejudice. Young said he got along fine with Wiggins and "I like the man".

Young started 12 games in the 1976 season, with three fumble recoveries, but had only 1.5 sacks. During the first game of the 1976 season, Young blocked an extra point attempt by the San Diego Chargers' kicker Toni Fritsch. In 1977, he started 11 games at right defensive end, leading the Chiefs with 5.5 sacks and two fumble recoveries. The Chiefs defense gave up the most yards in the NFL that season, and the second most points of any NFL team.

In an effort to bolster their defense, the Chiefs drafted defensive end Art Still with the second overall pick in the first round of 1978 NFL draft, and defensive end Sylvester Hicks with the first pick of the second round in that same draft (29th overall). The next day, Young was traded to the San Diego Chargers for wide receiver Larry Dorsey. The Chiefs' new coach Marv Levy believed the change of teams might benefit Young.

==== San Diego Chargers and Washington Redskins ====
Young was originally waived by the Chargers in late August 1978. One week later, the Chargers placed defensive end John Lee on injured reserve and recalled Young from waivers. Young started two games of the 10 in which he appeared for the Chargers in 1978, with 2.5 sacks and one forced fumble. In July 1979, the Chargers starting left defensive tackle Louie Kelcher, who had been a first-team All-Pro in 1978, suffered a knee injury, and was sidelined for all but three minutes of the 1979 season. The Chargers used Young to replace Kelcher at starting left defensive tackle that season.

Young arguably had his career-best season in 1979. He started all 16 games at left defensive tackle. He had a career-high 14 sacks, two forced fumbles, and three fumble recoveries (including one for a touchdown). He also recorded a safety when he sacked the Atlanta Falcons' quarterback Steve Bartkowski in the end zone late in the fourth quarter of an early December game.

In 1979, Young was named first-team All-AFC by United Press International (UPI). After his 1979 season, Young was named All-Pro at defensive tackle by Paul Zimmerman of Sports Illustrated, along with future Hall of Fame tackle Randy White. Zimmerman said that in filling in for Kelcher, Young "became a freewheeling, offense-shattering tackle in the best Leo Nomellini tradition". Young's Charger teammates elected him lineman of the year. The Chargers' record went from 9–7 in 1978 to 12–4 in 1979.

In 1980, Young returned to the role of reserve lineman with the Chargers. Kelcher returned to starting left tackle and was a second-team All-Pro that season. Gary "Big Hands" Johnson played right defensive tackle and was first-team All-Pro with 17.5 sacks. The defensive ends were first-team All-Pro (and future Hall of Famer) Fred Dean, and Leroy Jones who had 12 sacks in 1980. Young did start three games that season with two sacks, two forced fumbles and a fumble recovery.

In 1981, Young was traded to the Washington Redskins for offensive lineman Jeff Williams. He appeared in seven games for Washington, starting three. However, in November 1981, the Redskins cut Young and he was then claimed by the Chargers. He finished the 1981 season with the Chargers, appearing in five games and starting two, with one sack. He appeared in nine games for the Chargers in the strike-shortened 1982 season, starting two games, with one sack. The Chargers waived Young at the end of August 1983.

Over a 12-year NFL career, Young started 98 games. Unofficially, he had 59.5 quarterback sacks, along with two interceptions, at least six forced fumbles, 11 fumble recoveries and a safety. He scored a touchdown on an interception return and another on a fumble recovery.

=== USFL ===
In 1984, Young played for the Arizona Wranglers of the United States Football League. He started nine games and had two sacks.

== Coaching career ==
After retiring from football, Young became an assistant coach at Monticello High School in Charlottesville, Virginia, during which he helped lead the football team to their first state championship appearance in 2003 and first state championship victory in 2007. He also coached shot put for the Monticello track and field team. During the 2013–14 school year, he returned to William Penn University as an assistant football and track coach.

== Personal life and death ==
He had one child a daughter, Desiree Irwin, with Sharon Irwin of Roseville, Kansas.

For the last 17 years of his life, Young lived in Charlottesville, Virginia, where he worked at several homes for wayward boys and challenged adults, coached high school sports and worked in the customer service industry.

Young died on July 5, 2014, at Martha Jefferson Hospital in Charlottesville.
