= Bruise Brothers (San Diego Chargers) =

American football defensive lineman

The Bruise Brothers were a group of American football players who played on the defensive line for the San Diego Chargers in the National Football League (NFL). The foursome, consisting of Fred Dean, Gary Johnson, Louie Kelcher, and Leroy Jones, formed one of the most dominant lines of their era. The Chargers selected Johnson, Kelcher, and Dean in the first two rounds of the 1975 NFL draft, and traded for Jones the following year. They helped San Diego lead the league in sacks in 1980.

== History ==
In the 1975 draft, the core of the Bruise Brothers was formed when the Chargers drafted Johnson (first round, 8th overall pick), Kelcher (second round, 30th overall), and Dean (second round, 33rd overall) with three of their first four picks. Each of the three became an All-Pro player during his career. ESPN in 2009 ranked San Diego's 1975 draft class as the team's best draft ever; it is widely considered one of the best drafts for any franchise. The Chargers acquired Jones from the Los Angeles Rams in 1976 for a future draft choice. Dean played at right defensive end, Johnson at right defensive tackle, Kelcher at left tackle, and Jones at left end. Dean and Johnson became the primary pass rushers, while Kelcher and Jones developed into strong defenders against the run.

In 1978, they were considered the strength of the Chargers' defense. Sports Illustrated lauded their pass rushing ability, calling them an "awesome young front four" that was "better than average against the run, and its pass rush has clearly helped an unheralded secondary rank among the league's best." Don Coryell became San Diego's head coach after the team had started the season with a 1–3 record; they finished the year at 9–7. The Chargers then began a streak of three consecutive AFC West titles starting in 1979.

Those Chargers teams were known for their potent Air Coryell offense. Coryell's teams were criticized for their defense, but they allowed an NFL-low 246 points in 1979. Kelcher, however, was sidelined for all but three minutes after a knee operation, but Wilbur Young filled in and was named All-Pro by Sports Illustrated. Led by their defensive line and Johnson's team-record 17 1/2 sacks, San Diego in 1980 led the NFL with 60 sacks. Johnson, Kelcher, and Dean were all named starters in that season's Pro Bowl, a rarity for three defensive linemen from the same team; Jones, whose 12 sacks were second on the team behind Johnson, was also named an alternate for the Pro Bowl. That season, the Chargers line was nicknamed the Bruise Brothers, coined from a popular act at the time, The Blues Brothers. Fans were asked to mail in their suggestions. The Chargers' front office presented a list of 15 finalists to the linemen, who chose the winner.

Dean held out for a pay raise in 1981, and he was traded to the San Francisco 49ers in October. He was replaced by John Woodcock, who had nine sacks, but the Chargers' sack total fell to 47 that season, and their defense surrendered the second-most points in the American Football Conference. U-T San Diego in 2013 called the trade "perhaps the biggest blunder in franchise history."

== Aftermath ==
Dean in 1981 played on division winners for both San Diego and San Francisco. He was named the UPI NFC Defensive Player of the Year after recording 12 sacks in 11 games for the 49ers, and San Francisco won Super Bowl XVI that season. Kelcher retired in November 1983, but remained on the Chargers reserve list. The Chargers traded him to San Francisco in March 1984. Kelcher had wanted to play again, but not with San Diego. Johnson was also traded to San Francisco later that year, and he teamed with Dean and Kelcher to win Super Bowl XIX. He had been unproductive in the Chargers new 3–4 defensive scheme. While the 49ers' basic defense was a 3–4, they made Johnson comfortable by utilizing him whenever they switched to the 4–3. Sports Illustrated called Johnson the Super Bowl's "unofficial defensive MVP" after he recorded one sack, flushed Miami quarterback Dan Marino out of the pocket numerous times, and had four unassisted tackles.

Dean, Johnson, and Kelcher all finished their careers with San Francisco. They were each named to both the Chargers' 40th and 50th anniversary teams and inducted into the Chargers Hall of Fame. Dean was also inducted into the Pro Football Hall of Fame. After they traded Dean, the Chargers defense did not return to the upper half of the NFL rankings until the late 1980s.

== Chargers career sacks ==
The following table lists the Bruise Brothers members' sack totals during their Chargers career.

Rank	Chargers all-time rank through 1984
Player	Player name
Career	Years with Chargers
Sacks	Career sacks with Chargers
Honors	Notable honors won during Chargers career (Note: All-Pro includes years selected either first or second team by Associated Press (AP) or Newspaper Enterprise Association (NEA). Pro Bowl year corresponds to the NFL season the honor was earned not the following year which the Pro Bowl was played.)

Rank	Player	Career	Sacks	Honors
1	Gary Johnson	1975–1984	67.0	3× All-Pro (1980–1982), 4× Pro Bowl (1979–1982)
2	Fred Dean	1975–1981	53.5	All-Pro (1980), 2× Pro Bowl (1979, 1980)
3	Leroy Jones	1976–1983	43.5	N/A
4	Louie Kelcher	1975–1983	39.0	4× All-Pro (1977, 1978, 1980, 1981), 3× Pro Bowl (1977, 1978, 1980)
