= List of NFL 1,000-yard receiving trios =

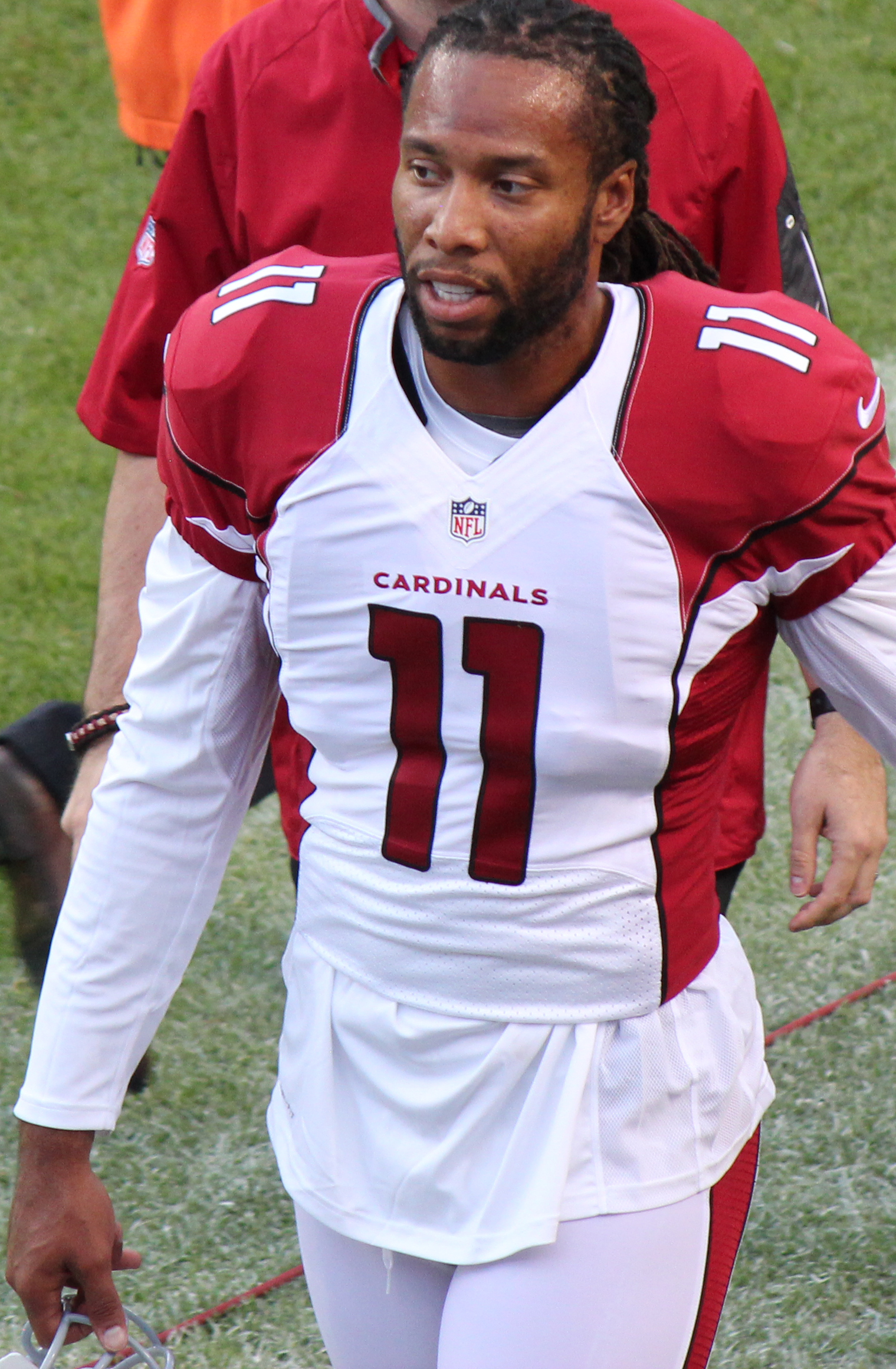
Arizona Cardinals wide receiver Larry Fitzgerald recorded 1,431 receiving yards in 2008, the most yards of any member of a 1,000-yard receiving trio.

In American football, passing, along with running, is one of the two methods of advancing the ball downfield. In order to advance the ball via passing, the ball must be caught by a receiver, tallying a reception. In addition to seven pairs of teammates who have rushed for 1,000 yards each in a season, there are five trios of teammates who have caught 1,000 yards each in a season.

== Player positions ==
Every member of the trios has been a wide receiver, with the exception of Kellen Winslow, a hall of fame tight end, and Eric Metcalf, a multi-purpose running back who set records as a return specialist. Wide receivers usually line up on or near the line of scrimmage, and their principal role is to catch passes. Wide receivers usually have fewer blocking roles in addition to advancing the ball down the field through receptions and rush attempts, unlike tight ends and running backs.

Furthermore, while a rushing play simply involves a handoff, snap, or pitch to a player, a passing requires a quarterback or other passer to throw the ball to the receiver. Every team that had a 1,000-yard receiving trio also had at least 4,000 team passing yards, with the remaining yards to other receivers on the team.

== History ==
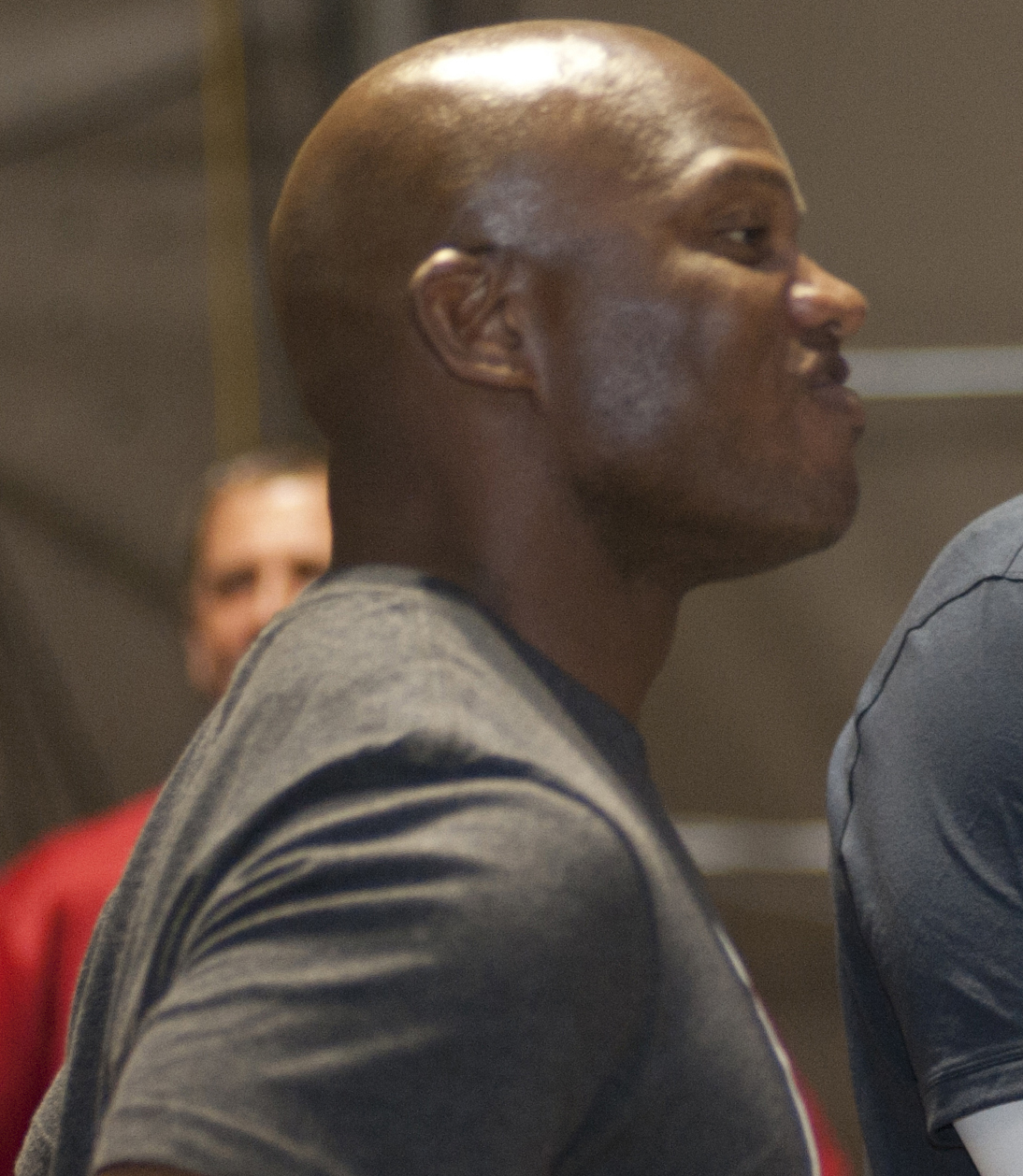
Atlanta Falcons running back Eric Metcalf recorded 104 receptions in 1995, the most receptions of any member of a 1,000-yard receiving trio.

The 1980 San Diego Chargers produced first 1,000-yard trio, consisting of John Jefferson, and Hall of Famers Winslow and Charlie Joiner. Their 3,762 combined yards are the highest total of any 1,000-yard trio. During this season, quarterback Dan Fouts passed for a then-record 4,715 yards under the Air Coryell system instituted by head coach Don Coryell.

The 1989 Washington Redskins produced the second 1,000-yard trio, consisting of wide receivers Art Monk, Gary Clark, and Ricky Sanders. Nicknamed "The Posse", this trio is the only trio who did not have a 4,000-yard quarterback, with two quarterbacks, Mark Rypien (3,768 yards) and Doug Williams (585 yards), needed to break the 4,000 yards passing mark (though Rypien only played 14 games of a 16-game season).

The 1995 Atlanta Falcons produced the third 1,000-yard trio, consisting of running back/wide receiver/return specialist Eric Metcalf and wide receivers Terance Mathis and Bert Emanuel. Metcalf's 104 receptions are the most by any member of a 1,000-yard trio. Quarterback Jeff George passed for 4,143 yards, the only time he passed for over 4,000 yards in his career.

The 2004 Indianapolis Colts produced the fourth 1,000-yard trio, consisting of wide receivers Marvin Harrison, Reggie Wayne, and Brandon Stokley. During this season, quarterback Peyton Manning passed for 4,557 yards and broke the season passing touchdown record of 48 touchdowns, held by Dan Marino, with 49 (which would be broken during the 2007 NFL season by Tom Brady, with 50, but then reclaimed by Manning in the 2013 NFL season). Harrison's 15 touchdowns are the most of any single receiver and the trio's 37 combined touchdowns are the most of a 1,000-yard trio.

The 2008 Arizona Cardinals produced the fifth and most recent 1,000 yard trio, consisting of wide receivers Larry Fitzgerald, Anquan Boldin, and Steve Breaston. Quarterback Kurt Warner's 4,583 yards were second only to Drew Brees's 5,069 passing yards (which fell 15 yards short of Dan Marino's then-record 5,084 yards). The Cardinals posted a 9-7 record, and advanced to Super Bowl XLIII, losing 27-23 to the Pittsburgh Steelers. Fitzgerald's 1,431 yards are the most of any member of a 1,000-yard trio. Their 262 combined receptions are the most of any 1,000-yard trio.

== 1,000 yard receiving trios ==
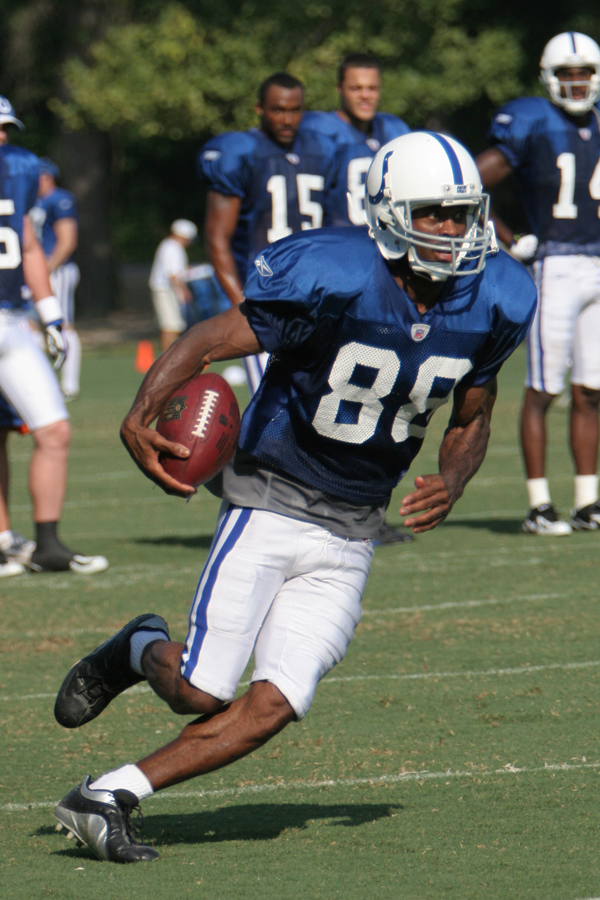
Indianapolis Colts wide receiver Marvin Harrison recorded 15 receiving touchdowns in 2004, the most touchdowns of any member of a 1,000-yard receiving trio.

Key
Symbol	Meaning
POS	The player's position
REC	Receptions
YDS	Receiving yards
AVG	Yards per reception
TD	Receiving
1st, 2nd, 3rd	Receiver as ranked by number of receptions
†	Pro Bowl player
‡	Pro Football Hall of Fame member
^{*}	Active NFL player

List of trios with at least 1,000 receiving yards each
Year	Team	1st	POS	REC	YDS	AVG	TD	2nd	POS	REC	YDS	AVG	TD	3rd	POS	REC	YDS	AVG	TD
1980	SD	Kellen Winslow†‡	TE	89	1,290	14.5	9	John Jefferson†	WR	82	1,340	16.3	13	Charlie Joiner†‡	WR	71	1,132	15.9	4
1989	WAS	Art Monk‡	WR	86	1,186	13.8	8	Ricky Sanders	WR	80	1,138	14.2	4	Gary Clark	WR	79	1,229	15.6	9
1995	ATL	Eric Metcalf	RB/WR	104	1,189	11.4	8	Terance Mathis	WR	78	1,039	13.3	9	Bert Emanuel	WR	74	1,039	14.0	5
2004	IND	Marvin Harrison†‡	WR	86	1,113	12.9	15	Reggie Wayne	WR	77	1,210	15.7	12	Brandon Stokley	WR	68	1,077	15.8	10
2008	ARI	Larry Fitzgerald†‡	WR	96	1,431	14.9	12	Anquan Boldin†	WR	89	1,038	11.7	11	Steve Breaston	WR	77	1,006	13.1	3

=== List of trios with at least 900 receiving yards each ===
Year	Team	1st	POS	REC	YDS	2nd	POS	REC	YDS	3rd	POS	REC	YDS
1985	SD	Lionel James	RB	86	1,027	Wes Chandler†	WR	67	1,199	Charlie Joiner‡	WR	59	932
1990	HOU	Haywood Jeffires	WR	75	1,048	Drew Hill†	WR	74	1,019	Ernest Givins†	WR	72	979
1991	HOU	Haywood Jeffires†	WR	100	1,181	Drew Hill	WR	90	1,109	Ernest Givins	WR	70	996
1994	NE	Ben Coates†	TE	96	1,174	Michael Timpson	WR	74	941	Vincent Brisby	WR	58	904
2002	OAK	Jerry Rice†‡	WR	92	1,211	Charlie Garner	RB	91	941	Tim Brown‡	WR	81	930
2011	NE	Wes Welker†	WR	122	1,569	Rob Gronkowski†	TE	90	1,327	Aaron Hernandez	TE	79	910
2012	DAL	Jason Witten†	TE	110	1,039	Dez Bryant	WR	92	1,382	Miles Austin	WR	66	943
2012	ATL	Tony Gonzalez†‡	TE	93	930	Roddy White	WR	92	1,351	Julio Jones†	WR	79	1,198
2012	NO	Jimmy Graham^{*}	TE	85	982	Marques Colston	WR	83	1,154	Lance Moore	WR	65	1,041
2014	NE	Julian Edelman	WR	92	972	Rob Gronkowski†	TE	83	1,124	Brandon LaFell	WR	74	953
2019	LAC	Keenan Allen†^{*}	WR	104	1,199	Austin Ekeler^{*}	RB	92	993	Mike Williams^{*}	WR	49	1,001
2023	MIN	T. J. Hockenson^{*}	TE	95	960	Jordan Addison^{*}	WR	70	911	Justin Jefferson^{*}	WR	68	1,074
