= Gary "Big Hands" Johnson =

American football player (1952–2010)

Gary Johnson
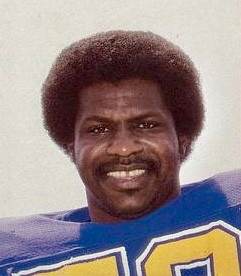
- Johnson with the San Diego Chargers c. 1982

No. 72, 79, 97
- Position: Defensive tackle

Personal information
- Born: August 31, 1952; Shreveport, Louisiana, U.S.
- Died: August 4, 2010 (aged 57); Shreveport, Louisiana, U.S.
- Listed height: 6 ft 2 in (1.88 m)
- Listed weight: 257 lb (117 kg)

Career information
- High school: Mitchell (Bossier City, Louisiana)
- College: Grambling State (1971–1974)
- NFL draft: 1975: 1st round, 8th overall pick

Career history
- San Diego Chargers (1975–1984); San Francisco 49ers (1984–1985)

Awards and highlights
- Super Bowl champion (XIX); 2× First-team All-Pro (1980, 1981); 2× Second-team All-Pro (1979, 1982); 4× Pro Bowl (1979–1982); NFL sacks leader (1980); PFWA All-Rookie Team (1975); Los Angeles Chargers Hall of Fame; San Diego Chargers 50th Anniversary Team; San Diego Chargers 40th Anniversary Team; First-team All-American (1974); 3× First-team Little All-American (1972–1974); Louisiana Sports Hall of Fame

Career NFL statistics
- Sacks: 16
- Safeties: 2
- Interceptions: 2
- Interception yards: 93
- Fumble recoveries: 13
- Defensive touchdowns: 3
- Stats at Pro Football Reference
- College Football Hall of Fame

Gary Lynn "Big Hands" Johnson (August 31, 1952 – August 4, 2010) was an American professional football player who was a defensive tackle in the National Football League (NFL). He was a four-time All-Pro and a four-time Pro Bowl selection. He played the majority of his NFL career with the San Diego Chargers, and he was inducted into the Chargers Hall of Fame.

Johnson played college football for the Grambling State Tigers, and was a three-time first-team Little All-American selection. He was drafted by San Diego in the 1975 NFL draft in the first round with the eighth overall pick. Johnson was named to the NFL All-Rookie team in his first season. The Chargers won three consecutive division titles from 1979 through 1981. Their defense led the league in sacks in 1980 behind Johnson's team-record 17 1/2 sacks. In 1984, Johnson was traded to the San Francisco 49ers, and he won a Super Bowl with the team that season. Johnson retired after the 49ers season in 1985.

He is a member of the College Football Hall of Fame and the Louisiana Sports Hall of Fame, and was named to both the Chargers' 40th and 50th anniversary teams.

== Early life ==
Johnson was born in Shreveport, Louisiana, and grew up in Bossier City. When Johnson was in the eighth grade, he wanted to pick up a basketball in his physical education class when his coach said, "Get your big hands off my basketball." The nickname "Big Hands" was born. He played football at Charlotte Mitchell and Airline High School in Bossier City, and later played college football at Grambling State University for their Tigers football team. He was selected by the Associated Press as a first-team defensive tackle on the Little All-America team as a sophomore in 1972. A senior in 1974, he was named a first-team All-American by the Newspaper Enterprise Association and earned his third straight Little All-American selection.

== NFL career ==
Johnson was selected by the San Diego Chargers in the first round of the 1975 NFL draft with the eighth overall pick. He was their first pick that year, when the Chargers also drafted other future defensive starters including cornerback Mike Williams, defensive linemen Fred Dean and Louie Kelcher, and safety Mike Fuller. Johnson was named to the NFL All-Rookie team, but did not start until the middle of the season. After only five sacks in his first two seasons, he broke out with 13 1/2 in 1977, when defensive line coach Jerry Smith arrived from Baltimore.

In 1980, the Chargers led the NFL with 60 sacks. That year Johnson led the league with 17 1/2 sacks, which is still a Chargers' team record. He broke Steve DeLong's mark of 17 in 1969. Johnson and Dean were named first-team All-Pro, with Kelcher being named second-team All-Pro. The trio, along with Leroy Jones, formed a defensive frontline that was nicknamed the Bruise Brothers. Johnson was also named the American Football Conference's Defensive Lineman of the Year by the National Football League Players Association. He again was named first-team All-Pro in 1981, and was second-team All-Pro in 1982. He was on Pro Bowl teams from 1980 to 1983. Don "Air" Coryell's Chargers teams of that era are mostly remembered for its high-scoring, pass-oriented offense. The Chargers won the AFC West from 1979 to 1981 and made the playoffs in 1982.

Johnson was re-united with Dean, Kelcher and Billy Shields on the San Francisco 49ers, and together they won Super Bowl XIX. Sports Illustrated called Johnson the Super Bowl's "unofficial defensive MVP" after he recorded one sack, flushed Miami quarterback Dan Marino out of the pocket numerous times, and had four unassisted tackles. Johnson retired after the 1985 season.

In 1991, Johnson was inducted into the Louisiana Sports Hall of Fame. In 1997, he was inducted into the College Football Hall of Fame. In 1999, he was inducted into the Chargers Hall of Fame. He is a member of both the Chargers 40th and 50th anniversary teams. He was elected posthumously into the Black College Football Hall of Fame in 2017.

== Death ==
Johnson suffered a stroke on July 20, 2010, and died on August 4 at the LSU Health Sciences Center in his hometown of Shreveport, Louisiana.

== See also ==
- 1974 College Football All-America Team
