= Louie Kelcher =

American football player (born 1953)

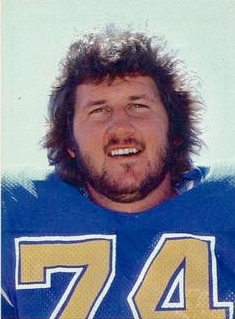
- Kelcher with the San Diego Chargers c. 1982

No. 74, 94
- Position: Defensive tackle

Personal information
- Born: August 23, 1953 (age 73); Beaumont, Texas, U.S.
- Listed height: 6 ft 5 in (1.96 m)
- Listed weight: 291 lb (132 kg)

Career information
- High school: French (Beaumont)
- College: SMU (1971–1974)
- NFL draft: 1975: 2nd round, 30th overall pick

Career history
- San Diego Chargers (1975–1983); San Francisco 49ers (1984)

Awards and highlights
- Super Bowl champion (XIX); 2× First-team All-Pro (1977, 1978); 2× Second-team All-Pro (1980, 1981); 3× Pro Bowl (1977, 1978, 1980); PFWA All-Rookie Team (1975); Los Angeles Chargers Hall of Fame; San Diego Chargers 50th Anniversary Team; San Diego Chargers 40th Anniversary Team; Consensus All-American (1974); SWC Defensive Player of the Year (1974); 2× First-team All-SWC (1972, 1974)

Career NFL statistics
- Games played: 116
- Games started: 89
- Interceptions: 2
- Stats at Pro Football Reference

Louis James Kelcher (born August 23, 1953) is an American former professional football player who was a defensive tackle in the National Football League (NFL), spending most of his career with the San Diego Chargers. He was a four-time All-Pro and a three-time Pro Bowl selection. Kelcher was inducted into the Chargers Hall of Fame and is a member of their 40th and 50th anniversary teams.

Kelcher played college football with the SMU Mustangs and earned consensus All-American honors as a senior in 1974. He was selected by the Chargers in the second round of the 1975 NFL draft. His outstanding performance made him one of the team's most popular players from 1975 through 1983. He joined the San Francisco 49ers in 1984 and helped them win Super Bowl XIX that season.

== Early life ==
Kelcher was born and raised in Beaumont, Texas. Growing up, he was more interested in playing baseball, even though youngsters in Texas who were big typically played football. He was supposed to be eight years old to play peewee league. However, Kelcher was bigger than his peers, and the Little League president next door got him in a year early. He started playing football in junior high school. Entering high school at Beaumont French, he was only interested in playing baseball, but the coaches placed him in football.

== College career ==
Kelcher attended Southern Methodist University, where he played for the Mustangs. As a senior in 1974, he was named National College Lineman of the Week by the Associated Press after recording 16 unassisted tackles and assisting on eight others in an 18–14 win over No. 5 Texas A&M. He was named a consensus All-American and voted the Southwest Conference's defensive player of the year.

== Professional career ==
Kelcher was known for his immense size. Standing 6 feet 5 inches (1.96 m), he once said his weight varied between 280 pounds (130 kg) and infinity; he wore size 17EEE shoes. He was selected by the San Diego Chargers in the second round of the 1975 NFL draft. He was named to the NFL All-Rookie team. In nine seasons (1975–1983) with the Chargers, Kelcher was selected to three Pro Bowls (1977, 1978 and 1980), twice as a starter. He was named All-AFC in 1977, 1978 and 1980; first-team All-Pro in 1977 and 1978; and second-team All-Pro in 1980 and 1981. His teammates voted him the Chargers' most valuable player in 1977, when he helped the team set a then-team record of 44 sacks. He was the first defensive tackle in the team's history to win the award.

in 1979, Kelcher was sidelined for all but three minutes after a knee operation. On November 18, 1979, against the Pittsburgh Steelers at San Diego Stadium, he asked Chargers coach Don Coryell to make Rolf Benirschke a captain for the day. The kicker was suffering from ulcerative colitis, and his weight had dropped from about 184 to 124 pounds (83 to 56 kg). In a pre-game ceremony on the field, Kelcher assisted his weakened teammate, captured in an iconic photo of the lineman, about 350 pounds (160 kg) then, holding Benirschke's hand as they walked together.

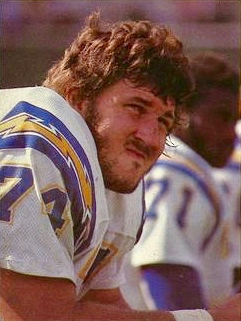
Kelcher helped the Chargers lead the league in sacks in 1980.

Kelcher returned in 1980, teaming with fellow 1975 Chargers' draftees Fred Dean and Gary "Big Hands" Johnson as the Chargers led the NFL in sacks (60). Johnson and Dean were named first-team All-Pro, with Kelcher being named second-team All-Pro. The trio, along with Leroy Jones formed a defensive frontline that was nicknamed the Bruise Brothers. In the 1980 AFC Championship Game against the Oakland Raiders, Kelcher had 20 tackles, 10 solo and 10 assisted, and also one sack. In the Epic in Miami, the 1981 divisional playoff which became one of the greatest football games ever, the Dolphins were leading 38–31 in the fourth quarter and threatening to score again at the Chargers' 20 when Kelcher stripped the ball from Miami's Andra Franklin and San Diego's Pete Shaw recovered the fumble. The Chargers rallied to force overtime and won 41–38. The Chargers teams of that era are mostly remembered for its high-scoring, pass-oriented, Air Coryell offense. San Diego made four consecutive playoffs (1979–1982), winning three straight AFC West titles (1979–1981) and advancing to back-to-back AFC championship games.

Kelcher retired in November 1983, but remained on the Chargers reserve list. The Chargers traded him to the San Francisco 49ers in March 1984. Kelcher had wanted to play again, but not with San Diego. The trade reunited him with former Charger teammates Johnson, Dean and offensive lineman Billy Shields. In his final NFL season that year, the 49ers won Super Bowl XIX.

== Legacy ==
Kelcher was a favorite among Chargers fans, who greeted him at home games with cheers of "Loueeee". Chargers quarterback Dan Fouts called him "the most universally beloved guy on our team." Kelcher was among the first NFL defensive linemen to weigh 300 pounds (140 kg). He was inducted into the Chargers Hall of Fame in 2003, and the Breitbard Hall of Fame in 2006. He was also named to both the Chargers' 40th and 50th anniversary teams.

Kelcher received first-team honors on the All-Southwest Conference football team of the 1970s, and he was inducted into the Southern Methodist University Hall of Fame in 2012.

== Later life ==
Kelcher moved to Austin, Texas, in 1992. He became co-owner with Doug English, a former college rival with the Texas Longhorns, in the warehousing firm Pro Line Warehouse and Distribution. Kelcher also had a stake in a trucking business in Texas.
