= Chuck Loewen =

American football player (born 1957)

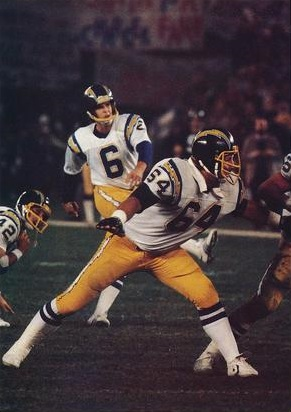
- Loewen (No. 64) in 1984

No. 64
- Positions: Tackle, guard

Personal information
- Born: January 23, 1957 (age 69); Mountain Lake, Minnesota, U.S.
- Listed height: 6 ft 3 in (1.91 m)
- Listed weight: 263 lb (119 kg)

Career information
- High school: Mountain Lake
- College: South Dakota State
- NFL draft: 1980: 7th round, 175th overall pick

Career history
- San Diego Chargers (1980–1982, 1984)

Career NFL statistics
- Games played: 47
- Games started: 3
- Stats at Pro Football Reference

Chuck Loewen (born January 23, 1957) is an American former professional football player who was a tackle and guard for the San Diego Chargers in the National Football League (NFL). He played college football for the South Dakota State Jackrabbits. He played for the Chargers from 1980 to 1982 and in 1984.
