= LaRue Harrington =

American football player (1957–2017)

No. 34
- Position: Running back

Personal information
- Born: June 28, 1957; Norfolk, Virginia, U.S.
- Died: March 2, 2017 (aged 59)
- Listed height: 6 ft 0 in (1.83 m)
- Listed weight: 210 lb (95 kg)

Career information
- High school: Portsmouth (VA) I. C. Norcom
- College: Norfolk State
- NFL draft: 1980: 6th round, 151st overall pick

Career history
- San Diego Chargers (1980); Los Angeles Express (1983–1984)
- Stats at Pro Football Reference

LaRue Harrington (June 28, 1957 – March 2, 2017) was an American football running back. He played for the San Diego Chargers in 1980 and for the Los Angeles Express from 1983 to 1984.

He died of a heart attack on March 2, 2017, at age 59.
