= Leroy Jones (gridiron football) =

American football player (1950–2021)

No. 73, 68
- Position: Defensive end

Personal information
- Born: September 29, 1950; Greenwood, Mississippi, U.S.
- Died: June 11, 2021 (aged 70); Casselberry, Florida, U.S.
- Listed height: 6 ft 8 in (2.03 m)
- Listed weight: 263 lb (119 kg)

Career information
- High school: Amanda Elzy (Greenwood)
- College: Norfolk State
- NFL draft: 1975: 2nd round, 48th overall pick

Career history
- Edmonton Eskimos (1973–1975); San Diego Chargers (1976–1983)

Awards and highlights
- 2× All-CIAA (1971, 1972)

Career NFL statistics
- Games played: 111
- Games started: 90
- Interceptions: 3
- Stats at Pro Football Reference

Leroy Jones (September 29, 1950 – June 11, 2021) was an American professional football player who was a defensive end in the National Football League (NFL) and Canadian Football League (CFL). He played the majority of his 11-year career with the San Diego Chargers (now Los Angeles) of the NFL.

Jones played both basketball and football in high school, and continued with both sports while attending college at Norfolk State University. He began his professional career in 1973 with the Edmonton Eskimos (now the Elks) in the CFL, where he spent three seasons. Jones was selected in the second round of the 1975 NFL draft by the Los Angeles Rams, who traded him in 1976 to San Diego, where he played through 1983.

== Early life ==
Jones was born and raised in Greenwood, Mississippi. He already stood 6 feet 4 inches (1.93 m) in the seventh grade. At Amanda Elzy High School, he was a standout at both football and basketball, leading his teams to multiple championships. In 2011, The Greenwood Commonwealth named him one of the top 25 sports figures in the Greenwood area's history.

== College career ==
Jones attended Norfolk State University after being recruited by a coach who was a Greenwood native. Jones was the center on three Central Intercollegiate Athletic Association (CIAA) tournament basketball teams. He was named to the All-CIAA Tournament team each year. As a sophomore in 1972, he was named to the Associated Press All-State first-team, and was named to the second-team as a junior.

Jones also played football for the Spartans, and he was named All-CIAA as a defensive end in 1971 and 1972. Before the 1973 football season, he learned that he would be academically ineligible to play due to poor grades. Jones dropped out of Norfolk State and signed a three-year contract to play football professionally in Canada. In 1983, he was a member of the inaugural class of Norfolk State's sports hall of fame.

== Professional career ==
Jones joined the Edmonton Eskimos in the Canadian Football League (CFL) as a taxi squad member in 1973, before being placed on a five-day tryout prior to the 61st Grey Cup. The following year, he led the team in tackles and sacks that season, as well as in the 62nd Grey Cup championship game.

Having left Norfolk State early, Jones was not eligible for the 1974 NFL draft. In the summer of 1973, pro scouts had projected him as a first-round pick in 1974, rating him near or on par with Ed "Too Tall" Jones, who became the first overall pick in 1974. Ruled eligible for the 1975 NFL draft, Leroy Jones was selected in the second round by the Los Angeles Rams with the 48th overall pick. He became the highest-drafted player in Norfolk State football history. Jones reportedly wanted to play for the Rams, but the Eskimos had an option year remaining on his contract. He missed the start of Edmonton's training camp before reporting three days later. In 1975, the Eskimos placed him on the injured reserve list in October. He was cut in November before the Western Football Conference championship game while still on the injured list. Edmonton won the 63rd Grey Cup that season with Bill Stevenson taking over Jones' former position at left defensive end.

The San Diego Chargers acquired Jones from the Rams in 1976 for a future draft choice. In 1980, he teamed with All-Pros Fred Dean, Gary "Big Hands" Johnson, and Louie Kelcher on the defensive line as the Chargers led the NFL in sacks (60). The foursome was nicknamed the Bruise Brothers. Jones that season had 12 sacks, second on the team behind Johnson's 17 1/2, and was named an alternate for the Pro Bowl. Don "Air" Coryell's Chargers teams of that era are mostly remembered for their high-scoring, pass-oriented offense. The Chargers won the AFC West from 1979–1981 and also qualified for the playoffs in 1982.

During the 1981 season, Jones blocked a 35-yard field goal by Miami kicker Uwe von Schamann at 11:27 into overtime, allowing San Diego to drive for its own field goal and win 41–38 in the playoff game known as the Epic in Miami, considered by many to be among the greatest NFL games ever. Jones played as a backup in his final season in 1983. He ended his career ranked third all-time in Chargers' history in career sacks with 43 1/2.

== Personal life ==
Jones died at age 70 on June 11, 2021, in Casselberry, Florida.
