= Billy Shields =

American football player (born 1954)

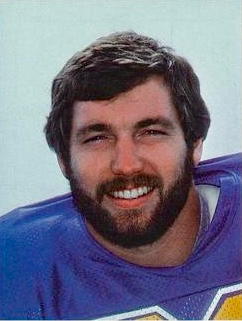
- Shields with the Chargers c. 1982

No. 66, 67, 70
- Position: Offensive tackle

Personal information
- Born: August 23, 1954 (age 72); Vicksburg, Mississippi, U.S.
- Listed height: 6 ft 8 in (2.03 m)
- Listed weight: 272 lb (123 kg)

Career information
- High school: Banks (Birmingham, Alabama)
- College: Georgia Tech (1972–1974)
- NFL draft: 1975: 6th round, 136th overall pick

Career history
- San Diego Chargers (1975–1983); San Francisco 49ers (1984); Kansas City Chiefs (1985); New York Jets (1985)

Awards and highlights
- Super Bowl champion (XIX)

Career NFL statistics
- Games played: 142
- Games started: 119
- Fumble recoveries: 4
- Stats at Pro Football Reference

William Dean Shields (born August 23, 1954) is an American former professional football player who was an offensive tackle in the National Football League (NFL), primarily for the San Diego Chargers. He played college football for the Georgia Tech Yellow Jackets and was selected by the Chargers in the sixth round of the 1975 NFL draft. Shields also played in the NFL for the San Francisco 49ers, New York Jets and Kansas City Chiefs.

== College career ==
Shields played college football at Georgia Tech from 1972 to 1974. He was inducted into the Georgia Tech Hall of Fame in 1985.

== Professional career ==
=== San Diego Chargers ===
Shields was selected by the San Diego Chargers in the sixth round of the 1975 NFL draft with the 136th overall pick. He became a starter for the team in 1976, and started 119 games for the team. A contract dispute between Shields and the Chargers resulted in his holding out during training camp, and this led to the team trading him to the Minnesota Vikings in August 1984. The Vikings, however, returned Shields to the Chargers after failing to come to contract terms with him and exercised a contingency clause for draft picks instead. Shields was waived by the Chargers a few weeks into the 1984 season.

=== San Francisco 49ers ===
The 49ers signed Shields off waivers in September 1984 to bolster the team's offensive line which had been hit by injuries to several players. Shields stated that he had been in discussions with four teams before choosing the 49ers, and that his decision was mainly based on personal relationships he had with already established with some of the team's coaches and players. Shields was mainly a reserve—playing in twelve games and starting once—on the Super Bowl XIX winners. He was traded to the New York Jets for a sixth round draft pick in August 1985.

=== New York Jets ===
Shields suffered a knee injury in the Jets' second game of the 1985 pre season, a 24–20 loss to the Cincinnati Bengals. Shields was placed on injured reserve by the team in September 1985, was reactivated in November 1985 but was cut by the team in December 1985.

=== Kansas City Chiefs ===
The Kansas City Chiefs claimed Shields off waivers from the Jets on December 7, 1985.

== Personal life and post playing career ==
Shields co-operated a development company in the San Diego area with former Chargers' teammate Don Macek in 1990.

Shields was a plaintiff in a 2012 lawsuit filed by former NFL player Brent Boyd against the NFL over concussion related injuries sustained while playing.
