= 1976 San Diego Chargers season =

1976 NFL team season

- Owner: Eugene V. Klein
- General manager: Johnny Sanders
- Head coach: Tommy Prothro
- Home stadium: San Diego Stadium

Results
- Record: 6–8
- Division place: 3rd AFC West
- Playoffs: Did not qualify
- All-Pros: None
- Pro Bowlers: 1: WR Charlie Joiner

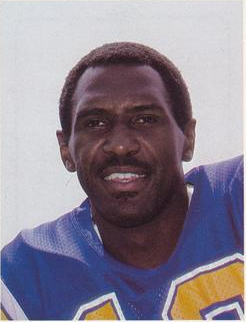
Veteran wide receiver Charlie Joiner gained the first Pro Bowl nomination of his career after joining the Chargers from Cincinnati.

The 1976 San Diego Chargers season was the franchise's seventh season in the National Football League (NFL), and its 17th overall. The Chargers improved on their 2–12 record from 1975 and finished 6–8, but missed the playoffs for the 11th straight season. The Chargers started off the season by winning their first three games, but they struggled through the rest of the season by losing eight of their last eleven, which included four shutout losses, two against division rival Denver.

Future Hall of Fame coach Bill Walsh spent this season as the Chargers' offensive coordinator, before moving on to Stanford University at the end of the year. Despite the shutouts, he oversaw a general improvement in the offense, as their yards per game improved from second-worst to 11th-best in the NFL. The Chargers began to pass more often, with quarterback Dan Fouts setting new career highs in every major passing category. He was aided by the acquisition of veteran wide receiver Charlie Joiner, who joined the team in a trade for defensive lineman Coy Bacon. Joiner was one of only three players league-wide to have over 1,000 receiving yards in 1976.

With Bacon having departed, the Chargers brought in Leroy Jones to join 2nd-year players Louie Kelcher, Gary "Big Hands" Johnson and Fred Dean on the defensive line. This would become a strong unit in the years ahead, known as the “Bruise Brothers”. In 1976, however, the Chargers defense ranked only 22nd in the league, with their pass defense ranked 27th out of 28 teams.

== Offseason ==
=== Departures and arrivals ===
San Diego were involved in a significant trade in April, sending defensive end Coy Bacon to Cincinnati in exchange for wide receiver Charlie Joiner. Bacon was an eight-year veteran who had spent the past three seasons in San Diego. While he had posted 10 sacks in 1975, he was a critic of the Chargers organization who had frequently asked to be traded. Joiner had spent three and a half seasons in Houston before spending the same period with the Bengals. Joiner’s 1975 season had been the most productive of his career to that point in terms of catches (37) and yards (726). He had an immediate impact, with four consecutive 100-yard games early in the season, and a final total of 1,056 yards, third best in the league. Joiner was voted to the Pro Bowl; quarterback Dan Fouts described him as the best receiver he had played with, praising his intelligence. It was also the start of a long and successful spell in San Diego, covering 11 seasons and including three Pro Bowl nominations and a 1st-Team All-Pro nomination. Joiner eventually retired with the NFL career records for receptions and receiving yards, and was later inducted into the Pro Football Hall of Fame.

Other changes to the offense included the departure of two offensive line starters. Guard Ira Gordon had started every game the past two seasons, but joined the Tampa Bay Buccaneers in the expansion draft. Tackle Terry Owens had started over 100 games for the Chargers since being drafted by them in 1966, though he had missed half the previous season with a back injury. A trade to the Saints fell through because Owens had been placed on injured reserve the previous season; he was waived and claimed by the Raiders instead. Like Bacon, Owens parted with the Chargers on bad terms, describing them as a 'dog' team. At running back, the Chargers added two-time Super Bowl winner Mercury Morris, though he retired after only one season in San Diego.

To replace the departing Bacon, the Chargers brought in a new defensive end. Leroy Jones had started his professional career in Edmonton, before being signed by the Los Angeles Rams on 6 May. On 6 September, Jones was traded to San Diego for an undisclosed draft pick. Jones went on to start 90 games and post 45 sacks during an eight-year career in San Diego, playing on the defensive line unit that would become known as the “Bruise Brothers”. The Chargers also brought in defensive tackle Charles DeJurnett from the Southern California Sun of the World Football League. Though primarily a backup, he had 21 1/2 sacks during his five years in San Diego. On special teams, long-serving punter Dennis Partee lost his job to former Cowboy Mitch Hoopes. Partee had missed only a single game in eight years with the Chargers, but he had struggled with a back injury in 1975, and his average yards per kick had declined. Hoopes himself was cut and replaced with Jeff West during the season.

San Diego also gained a new offensive coordinator in Bill Walsh, who had built a reputation as a strong coach of the passing game during eight seasons in Cincinnati. Walsh, who would go on to earn a place in the Hall of Fame through his work in San Francisco, stayed with the Chargers for less than a year, but was instrumental in quarterback Fouts' development during that period.

==== 1976 expansion draft ====
San Diego Chargers selected during the expansion draft
Round	Overall	Name	Position	Expansion team
0	0	Ira Gordon	Guard	Tampa Bay Buccaneers
0	0	Dave Tipton	Defensive end	Seattle Seahawks
0	0	Charles Waddell	Tight end	Seattle Seahawks

=== NFL draft ===
The Chargers had the 4th overall pick in the draft, and used it on Joe Washington a running back described as "electrifying" by general manager Johnny Sanders. Washington had scored 43 touchdowns at Oklahoma, and was brought in to partner Don Woods in the backfield, with Woods having missed time with a knee injury in 1975. The plan was derailed in preseason when Washington also picked up a knee injury and required surgery. He didn't play at all during his rookie season, and left San Diego for Baltimore in 1978 without having scored a touchdown for the Chargers. By contrast, San Diego's 2nd round pick Don Macek would be with them for 14 seasons. A college center who the Chargers converted to guard, Macek started every game in 1976. He later shifted back to center, and went on to start a total of 150 games while spending his entire career in San Diego, later being voted to the Chargers 50th Anniversary Team.

In the 5th round, the Chargers acquired another long-time starter in linebacker Woodrow Lowe. Lowe started every game in his rookie season, and proved durable throughout an 11-season career spent entirely in San Diego, appearing in 164 of a possible 165 games, and starting 151, while compiling 26 sacks, 21 interceptions and four defensive touchdowns. Like Macek, he was later named in the 50th Anniversary team. Two further selections at linebacker would eventually break into the first team: Bob Horn was mainly a backup through his first two seasons, but started every game from 1978 to 1980, eventually playing for six years in San Diego; Ray Preston's 29 starts with the team all came in 1979 and 1980, but he appeared in nearly 100 further games throughout a nine-year career, all with the Chargers. The trio played together in every game during the 1979 season, a year when the Chargers went 12–4 with the league's second-ranked defense.

1976 San Diego Chargers draft
Round	Pick	Player	Position	College	Notes
1	4	Joe Washington *	Running back	Oklahoma	
2	31	Don Macek	Center	Boston College	
3	64	Larry Dorsey	Wide receiver	Tennessee State	
4	94	Bob Horn	Linebacker	Oregon State	
4	113	Ron Singleton	Tackle	Grambling State	
4	115	Artie Owens	Wide receiver	West Virginia	
5	131	Woodrow Lowe	Linebacker	Alabama	
6	178	Calvin Lane	Defensive back	Fresno State	
8	212	Tony DiRienzo	Kicker	Oklahoma	
9	251	Glynn Harrison	Running back	Georgia	
10	268	Jeff Perlinger	Defensive end	Michigan	
11	295	Ray Preston	Linebacker	Syracuse	
12	322	Ron Lee	Defensive back	Oregon	
12	337	Herman Harris	Defensive back	Mississippi Valley State	
13	351	John Lee	Defensive end	Nebraska	
14	378	Ed Jones	Guard	Cincinnati	
15	407	Jack Hoffman	Defensive tackle	Indiana	
16	434	Jack Harrison	Guard	California	
17	463	Clarence Sanders	Linebacker	Cincinnati	
Made roster * Made at least one Pro Bowl during career

== Personnel ==
=== Staff ===
1976 San Diego Chargers staff
Front office: Owner – Gene Klein; General manager – Johnny Sanders; Head coaches: Head coach – Tommy Prothro; Offensive coaches: Offensive coordinator – Bill Walsh; Offensive backfield – Earnel Durden; Offensive line – Bobb McKittrick & Howard Mudd	Defensive coaches: Defensive coordinator – Jackie Simpson; Defensive line coach – Rudy Feldman; Secondary – Ernie Zampese

=== Roster ===
1976 San Diego Chargers roster
Quarterbacks (QB): 14 Dan Fouts; 19 Neal Jeffrey; 16 Clint Longley; Running backs (RB): 41 Bo Matthews; 23 Mercury Morris; 30 Sam Scarber; 33 Don Woods; 34 Rickey Young; Wide receivers (WR): 7 Eddie Bell; 87 Larry Dorsey; 18 Charlie Joiner; 89 Dwight McDonald; 85 Artie Owens; Tight ends (TE): 82 Pat Curran; 83 Larry Mialik	Offensive linemen (OL): 64 Charles Aiu G; 54 Ed Flanagan C; 62 Don Macek G; 53 Ralph Perretta C; 66 Billy Shields T; 72 Ron Singleton T; 70 Russ Washington T; 63 Doug Wilkerson G; Defensive linemen (DL): 71 Fred Dean DE; 73 Charles DeJurnett DT; 74 Louie Kelcher DT; 79 Gary Johnson DT; 68 Leroy Jones DE; 69 John Lee DE	Linebackers (LB): 50 Don Goode OLB; 58 Tom Graham MLB; 55 Bob Horn MLB; 51 Woodrow Lowe OLB; 57 Rick Middleton OLB; 52 Ray Preston OLB; Defensive backs (DB): 46 Danny Colbert CB; 44 Chris Fletcher FS; 42 Mike Fuller SS; 45 Hal Stringert CB/FS; 43 Jim Tolbert SS; 29 Mike Williams CB; Special teams (ST): 6 Ray Wersching K; 80 Jeff West P	Reserve: 88 Chuck Bradley TE (IR); 65 Booker Brown T (IR); 15 Toni Fritsch K (IR); 27 Gary Garrison WR (IR); 22 Tom Hayes CB (IR); 77 John Teerlinck DE (IR); 24 Joe Washington RB (IR); Rookies in italics

== Preseason ==
The Chargers scored three rushing touchdowns in their preseason opener against the Eagles. Don Woods scored the first two after an interception and a fumble recovery by Mike Williams, and Washington, the Chargers' 1st-round pick, had the third. Against the Patriots, Woods again scored twice and Washington once, before Chris Fletcher sealed the win with an interception return touchdown on the game's final play. The victory was marred when Washington sustained a knee injury while making a cut. While head coach Tommy Prothro initially reported the injury not to be too serious, Washington eventually needed surgery and missed the entire season.

In their next game San Diego met the Cardinals in Japan; it was the first time an NFL game had been played outside of North America. The Chargers were defeated for the first time in the preseason, with Dwight MacDonald scoring their lone touchdown on a pass from Fouts. Their following game was the NFL's first in Hawaii. Fouts was rested, with backup Neal Jeffrey playing the whole game. Rickey Young scored a touchdown, and Sergio Albert kicked three field goals, the last for a 16–14 lead with 59 seconds to play, but San Francisco came back with a winning field goal as time expired.

The Chargers lost their fifth game in Seattle, giving the expansion Seahawks their first win as an NFL franchise. Fouts and MacDonald combined for another touchdown, and Bo Matthews broke a 10–10 tie with a 9-yard run in the final quarter. However, kicker John Delaney missed the extra point, eventually allowing Seattle to win the game with a touchdown and successful conversion with 13 seconds to play. For their preseason finale, the Chargers returned to San Diego and evened their record at 3–3 by beating the Giants. Charlie Joiner caught touchdown passes from both Fouts and Jeffrey as the Chargers overcame a 13–0 1st quarter deficit, winning 14–13 after New York's kicker missed a late field goal attempt.

Week	Date	Opponent	Result	Record	Venue	Attendance
1	July 31	Philadelphia Eagles	W 20–7	1–0	San Diego Stadium	23,862
2	August 6	vs. New England Patriots	W 26–17	2–0	Owen Field, Norman, Oklahoma	23,800
3	August 16	vs. St. Louis Cardinals	L 10–20	2–1	Korakuen Stadium, Tokyo, Japan	38,000
4	August 21	vs. San Francisco 49ers	L 16–17	2–2	Aloha Stadium, Honolulu, Hawaii	36,364
5	August 29	at Seattle Seahawks	L 16–17	2–3	Kingdome	59,092
6	September 4	New York Giants	W 14–13	3–3	San Diego Stadium	28,797

== Regular season ==
=== Overview ===
San Diego took only three weeks to improve upon their 1975 win total, unexpectedly starting 3–0. They were unable to maintain that form, winning only three of their final eleven games, sustaining four shutouts and finishing 6–8. Despite the shutouts, the offense improved considerably under Walsh, going from the 25th- to the 11th-ranked team for total yardage.

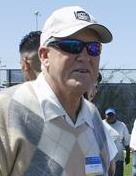
Bill Walsh oversaw a considerable improvement during his single season as offensive coordinator.

The passing game became much more productive, with ten more touchdowns and over 800 more yards than the previous year. Fouts played in every game and started all bar one. He comfortably set new career highs for attempts (359), completions (208), yards (2,535) and touchdowns (14), ranking in the top ten of the league in each of those statistics. While his interception count also increased (to 15), his passer rating of 75.4 comfortably exceeded the league-wide average of 67.0. His most prolific receiver was the newly-arrived Joiner, who led the team in receptions, receiving yards and receiving touchdowns. His 1,056 yards were the third most in the NFL. With 11th-year wide receiver Gary Garrison missing almost the whole year with a shoulder injury, no other Charger had more receiving yards than fullback Young, with 441, while the second-most productive wide receiver was Dwight MacDonald with 161 yards. Macdonald did score touchdowns on 4 of his 11 receptions. The Chargers were 17th in the 28-team league for rushing yards with 2,040. Young was their leading rusher, his 802 yards coming at 5.0 per carry. Woods, the 1976 Offensive Rookie of the Year, added 450 yards as he returned from a serious knee injury.

The Charger defense ranked 22nd in the league, showing a vulnerability to the pass. Opposing teams passed for 2,628 yards; only the Dolphins gave up more. San Diego did manage 20 interceptions, with Don Goode (6) and Mike Williams (4) accounting for half of them. Louie Kelcher unofficially (Note: The NFL did not keep sack statistics officially until 1982. Members of the Professional Football Researchers Association have largely reconstructed sack data from 1960 onwards based on official gamebooks, but the NFL does not acknowledge pre-1982 sack numbers.) led the Chargers in sacks with 6 1/2, but the team had only 23 in total, fifth-lowest in the NFL; Bacon, who the Chargers had traded to Cincinnati in the offseason, had a league-leading 21 1/2 by himself.

On special teams, Mike Fuller averaged 13.2 yards per punt return, fourth-best in the league. The team did not fare as well on kickoff returns: Fuller and Artie Owens split the returns, but neither averaged in the league's top 20. The Chargers cut kicker Ray Wersching after acquiring Toni Fritsch from the Dallas Cowboys before the start of the season, then recalled Wersching when Fritsch was injured after five games. Both kickers converted 50% of their field goals, well below the league leaders, who converted over 78%. They also changed punters mid-season, with Hoopes cut after a pair of errors. His replacement, West, produced more yards per punt (40.7 to 38.8).

=== Schedule ===
Week	Date	Opponent	Result	Record	Venue	Attendance	Recap
1	September 12	at **Kansas City Chiefs**	**W** 30–16	1–0	Arrowhead Stadium	53,133	Recap
2	September 19	at **Tampa Bay Buccaneers**	**W** 23–0	2–0	Tampa Stadium	39,558	Recap
3	September 26	St. Louis Cardinals	**W** 43–24	3–0	San Diego Stadium	40,212	Recap
4	October 3	at **Denver Broncos**	**L** 0–26	3–1	Mile High Stadium	63,369	Recap
5	October 10	**Oakland Raiders**	**L** 17–27	3–2	San Diego Stadium	50,523	Recap
6	October 17	Houston Oilers	**W** 30–27	4–2	San Diego Stadium	31,565	Recap
7	October 24	at Cleveland Browns	**L** 17–21	4–3	Cleveland Municipal Stadium	60,018	Recap
8	October 31	at Pittsburgh Steelers	**L** 0–23	4–4	Three Rivers Stadium	45,484	Recap
9	November 7	Baltimore Colts	**L** 21–37	4–5	San Diego Stadium	42,827	Recap
10	November 14	**Denver Broncos**	**L** 0–17	4–6	San Diego Stadium	32,017	Recap
11	November 21	at Buffalo Bills	**W** 34–13	5–6	Rich Stadium	36,539	Recap
12	November 28	**Kansas City Chiefs**	**L** 20–23	5–7	San Diego Stadium	29,272	Recap
13	December 5	San Francisco 49ers	**W** 13–7 (OT)	6–7	San Diego Stadium	33,539	Recap
14	December 12	at **Oakland Raiders**	**L** 0–24	6–8	Oakland–Alameda County Coliseum	50,102	Recap
Note: Intra-division opponents are in **bold** text.

=== Game summaries ===
All game reports use the Pro Football Researchers' gamebook archive as a source. Television details sourced via 506sports archive.

==== Week 1: at Kansas City Chiefs ====
Week One: San Diego Chargers at Kansas City Chiefs – Game summary

Quarter	1	2	3	4	Total
**Chargers**	6	7	14	3	**30**
Chiefs	6	10	0	0	**16**

at Arrowhead Stadium, Kansas City, Missouri

- Date: September 12
- Game time: 1:00 p.m. CDT
- Game weather: 74 °F (23.3 °C), relative humidity 41%, wind 15 miles per hour (24 km/h; 13 kn)
- Game attendance: 53,133
- Referee: Bob Frederic
- TV announcers (NBC): Jack Buck and Len Dawson
- Box score

Game information

**First quarter**

- SDG – Rickey Young 1-yard run (kick blocked), 9:25. Chargers 6–0. **Drive: 9 plays, 80 yards, 3:51.**
- KAN – Walter White 8 yard pass from Mike Livingston (kick blocked), 2:43. Tied 6–6. **Drive: 3 plays, 6 yards, 0:47.**

**Second quarter**

- KAN – Jan Stenerud 28-yard field goal, 3:57. Chiefs 9–6. **Drive: 14 plays, 66 yards, 6:04.**
- SDG – Charlie Joiner 3-yard pass from Dan Fouts (Toni Fritsch kick), 1:48. Chargers 13–9. **Drive: 6 plays, 67 yards, 2:09.**
- KAN – Billy Masters 10-yard pass from Mike Livingston (Jan Stenerud kick), 0:32. Chiefs 16–13. **Drive: 7 plays, 71 yards, 1:16.**

**Third quarter**

- SDG – Sam Scarber 2-yard run (Toni Fritsch kick), 11:20. Chargers 20–16. **Drive: 9 plays, 74 yards, 3:40.**
- SDG – Gary Garrison 22-yard pass from Dan Fouts (Toni Fritsch kick), 0:43. Chargers 27–16. **Drive: 12 plays, 86 yards, 4:17.**

**Fourth quarter**

- SDG – Toni Fritsch 37-yard field goal, 14:15. Chargers 30–16. **Drive: 4 plays, 5 yards, 1:05.**

**Top passers**

- SDG – Dan Fouts – 7/30, 205 yards, 2 TD
- KAN – Mike Livingston – 20/34, 236 yards, 2 TD, 3 INT

**Top rushers**

- SDG – Rickey Young – 14 rushes, 76 yards, TD
- KAN – Woody Green – 12 rushes, 62 yards

**Top receivers**

- SDG – Charlie Joiner – 4 receptions, 59 yards, TD
- KAN – Billy Masters – 4 receptions, 79 yards, TD

Seventeen unanswered points in the second half were enough for San Diego to begin their season with a win. On their third offensive play, Gary Garrison caught a 36-yard pass from Fouts, the longest play in an 80-yard touchdown drive capped by Young's short run. Fritsch had his extra point attempt blocked, and Hoopes later had a punt blocked after struggling to field a low snap. That led to a Kansas City touchdown, though the score remained tied at 6–6 after Lowe produced an extra point block of his own. Don Goode later set up a field goal try with an interception, but Fritsch was the victim of a further blocked kick. The Chiefs went ahead with a successful field goal, then San Diego responded with a 67-yard touchdown drive, Morris breaking off a 30-yard run to the 3 from where Fouts found Joiner for his first Chargers touchdown. Kansas City came straight back with a quick touchdown drive, and led 16–13 at halftime.

San Diego opened up the second half with a 74-yard touchdown drive. Joiner had catches of 16 and 18 yards, Woods had runs of 18 and 14 yards, and Sam Scarber ran in the go-ahead score from the 2. Lowe then ended a Kansas City threat when he recovered a fumble in his own territory. After an exchange of punts, the Chargers put together a 12-play, 86-yard drive, converting three 3rd downs, the last of which was Garrison's 22-yard touchdown catch on 3rd and 10. An interception by Tom Graham set up a Fritsch field goal soon afterwards, and another Goode interception helped ensure the lead stood up.

All four San Diego touchdown drives covered at least 67 yards. The Chargers produced 467 yards of offense, more than they'd managed in any game during the 1975 season. Garrison's touchdown came on his 404th and final reception as a Charger.

==== Week 2: at Tampa Bay Buccaneers ====
Week Two: San Diego Chargers at Tampa Bay Buccaneers – Game summary

Quarter	1	2	3	4	Total
**Chargers**	3	3	0	17	**23**
Buccaneers	0	0	0	0	**0**

at Tampa Stadium, Tampa Bay, Florida

- Date: September 19
- Game time: 1:00 p.m. EDT
- Game weather: 77 °F (25 °C), relative humidity 75%, wind 7 miles per hour (11 km/h; 6.1 kn)
- Game attendance: 39,558
- Referee: Fred Wyant
- TV announcers (NBC): Jay Randolph and Floyd Little
- Box score

Game information

**First quarter**

- SDG – Toni Fritsch 48-yard field goal, 7:01. Chargers 3–0. **Drive: 6 plays, 17 yards.**

**Second quarter**

- SDG – Toni Fritsch 48-yard field goal, 3:23. Chargers 6–0. **Drive: 8 plays, 50 yards.**

**Third quarter**

- No scoring plays.

**Fourth quarter**

- SDG – Toni Fritsch 22-yard field goal, 8:57. Chargers 9–0. **Drive: 4 plays, 3 yards.**
- SDG – Rickey Young 46-yard run (Toni Fritsch kick), 2:55. Chargers 16–0. **Drive: 8 plays, 71 yards, 1:05.**
- SDG – Tom Hayes 37-yard interception return (Toni Fritsch kick), 2:37. Chargers 23–0.

**Top passers**

- SDG – Dan Fouts – 14/21, 154 yards
- TB – Steve Spurrier – 3/10, 13 yards

**Top rushers**

- SDG – Rickey Young – 13 rushes, 85 yards, TD
- TB – Parnell Dickinson – 3 rushes, 54 yards

**Top receivers**

- SDG – Charlie Joiner – 3 receptions, 59 yards
- TB – Bob Moore – 2 receptions, 17 yards

San Diego ground out a defensive win in a game with no touchdowns in the first 57 minutes. In the opening quarter, the expansion Buccaneers went three-and-out on each of their first four possessions, while San Diego took the lead through a 48-yard Fritsch field goal. Tampa Bay missed a field goal try in the 2nd quarter, and Fritsch soon converted from the same distance again, though he missed shorter kicks on the Chargers' next two possessions, keeping the halftime score at 6–0.

On the opening possession of the 3rd quarter, Fritsch ended a third consecutive drive with a failed field goal, this one being blocked. Fritsch did convert a 22-yard attempt in the final quarter, pushing the advantage up to 9–0. The Buccaneers threatened to respond when Parnell Dickinson, the third quarterback they'd used throughout the game, broke away on a 46-yard run, but the drive ended with another missed field goal. On the following drive, Young put the game away when he went around right end for a 46-yard touchdown run with 2:55 to play. Tom Hayes added another touchdown only 18 seconds later when he intercepted Dickinson and was untouched on a 37-yard return.

The Buccaneers' starting quarterback, Steve Spurrier, finished with 3 completions from 10 passes for 13 yards. Neither of his replacements completed a pass, with Larry Lawrence intercepted on two of his five passes, and Dickinson on one of his three attempts. With John Lee and Gary Johnson posting a sack each for a loss of 17 yards, Tampa Bay finished with -4 passing yards. In total offensive yardage, San Diego had a 326–125 advantage, while picking up 16 first downs to the Buccaneers' 5. Garrison separated his shoulder while trying to catch an off-target Fouts pass, and missed the rest of the season.

==== Week 3: vs. St. Louis Cardinals ====
Week Three: St. Louis Cardinals at San Diego Chargers – Game summary

Quarter	1	2	3	4	Total
Cardinals	10	0	7	7	**24**
**Chargers**	6	27	3	7	**43**

at San Diego Stadium, San Diego, California

- Date: September 26
- Game time: 1:00 p.m. PDT
- Game weather: 71 °F (21.7 °C), relative humidity 73%, wind 10 miles per hour (16 km/h; 8.7 kn)
- Game attendance: 40,212
- Referee: Chuck Heberling
- TV announcers (CBS): Bob Costas and Tim Van Galder
- Box score

Game information

**First quarter**

- SDG – Don Woods 13-yard run (kick failed), 14:32. Chargers 6–0. **Drive: 2 plays, 72 yards, 0:28.**
- STL – J. V. Cain 14-yard pass from Jim Hart (Jim Bakken kick), 11:06. Cardinals 7–6. **Drive: 6 plays, 17 yards, 3:26.**
- STL – Jim Bakken 32-yard field goal, 4:55. Cardinals 10–6. **Drive: 11 plays, 39 yards, 4:28.**

**Second quarter**

- SDG – Rickey Young 3-yard run (Toni Fritsch kick), 14:57. Chargers 13–10. **Drive: 9 plays, 71 yards, 4:49.**
- SDG – Charlie Joiner 30-yard pass from Dan Fouts (kick failed), 14:43. Chargers 19–10. **Drive: 1 play, 30 yards, 0:14.**
- SDG – Dwight McDonald 44-yard pass from Dan Fouts (Toni Fritsch kick), 9:25. Chargers 26–10. **Drive: 6 plays, 75 yards, 2:28.**
- SDG – Dwight McDonald 18-yard pass from Dan Fouts (Toni Fritsch kick), 0:35. Chargers 33–10. **Drive: 2 plays, 13 yards, 0:16.**

**Third quarter**

- STL – Wayne Morris 11-yard pass from Jim Hart (Jim Bakken kick), 8:54. Chargers 33–17. **Drive: 11 plays, 62 yards, 6:06.**
- SDG – Toni Fritsch 39-yard field goal, 4:13. Chargers 36–17. **Drive: 9 plays, 53 yards, 4:41.**

**Fourth quarter**

- SDG – Pat Curran 1-yard pass from Dan Fouts (Toni Fritsch kick), 8:11. Chargers 43–17. **Drive: 11 plays, 39 yards, 5:39.**
- STL – Wayne Morris 1-yard run (Jim Bakken kick), 5:13. Chargers 43–24. **Drive: 9 plays, 75 yards, 2:48.**

**Top passers**

- STL – Jim Hart – 20/33, 240 yards, 2 TD, INT
- SDG – Dan Fouts – 15/18, 259 yards, 4 TD

**Top rushers**

- STL – Terry Metcalf – 11 rushes, 40 yards
- SDG – Rickey Young – 10 rushes, 72 yards, TD

**Top receivers**

- STL – J. V. Cain – 6 receptions, 98 yards, TD
- SDG – Charlie Joiner – 5 receptions, 134 yards, TD

Four unanswered 2nd quarter touchdowns helped maintain the Chargers' unbeaten start. On the game's first play from scrimmage, Joiner took a short pass for a 59-yard gain, with Doug Wilkerson making a key block. Woods overpowered multiple tacklers on the following play, a 13-yard touchdown run. Two scoring drives by the Cardinals put them 10–6 ahead, before San Diego drove to a 3rd and 1 at the St. Louis 3 as time expired in the opening quarter. Young ran the ball in on the following play, Rick Middleton recovered a fumble on the ensuing kickoff, and Fouts immediately hit Joiner for a 30-yard touchdown, giving the Chargers two scores in the opening 17 seconds of the 2nd quarter. Graham set up two further Charger scores with a fumble recovery and an interception; both times, Fouts combined with MacDonald on touchdown passes, covering 44 and 18 yards. Trailing 33–10 at the break, the Cardinals responded with a touchdown on the opening possession of the second half, but the Chargers responded with a field goal drive, and later put the game away with a 1-yard touchdown pass from Fouts to tight end Pat Curran.

Fouts completed 15 of 18 passes for 259 yards, with 4 touchdowns and no interceptions. This gave him a perfect passer rating of 158.3; as of 2026, it remains the only such rating in Chargers history. Joiner caught 5 passes for 134 yards and a touchdown. The Chargers had all five of the game's takeaways, with four fumble recoveries and an interception. It was San Diego's first 3–0 start since 1968.

==== Week 4: at Denver Broncos ====
Week Four: San Diego Chargers at Denver Broncos – Game summary

Quarter	1	2	3	4	Total
Chargers	0	0	0	0	**0**
**Broncos**	0	10	6	10	**26**

at Mile High Stadium, Denver, Colorado

- Date: October 3
- Game time: 2:00 p.m. MDT
- Game weather: 61 °F (16.1 °C), relative humidity 38%, wind 15 miles per hour (24 km/h; 13 kn)
- Game attendance: 63,369
- Referee: Dick Jorgensen
- TV announcers (NBC): Jay Randolph and Floyd Little
- Box score

Game information

**First quarter**

- No scoring plays.

**Second quarter**

- DEN – Jim Turner 47-yard field goal, 14:46. Broncos 3–0. **Drive: 6 plays, 48 yards, 2:10.**
- DEN – Rick Upchurch 92-yard punt return (Jim Turner kick), 1:51. Broncos 10–0.

**Third quarter**

- DEN – Jim Turner 25-yard field goal, 7:26. Broncos 13–0. **Drive: 10 plays, 72 yards, 4:31.**
- DEN – Jim Turner 36-yard field goal, 0:21. Broncos 16–0. **Drive: 9 plays, 63 yards, 5:08.**

**Fourth quarter**

- DEN – Lonnie Perrin 1-yard run (Jim Turner kick), 12:04. Broncos 23–0. **Drive: 8 plays, 34 yards, 3:06.**
- DEN – Jim Turner 27-yard field goal, 4:00. Broncos 26–0. **Drive: 10 plays, 39 yards, 4:27.**

**Top passers**

- SDG – Dan Fouts – 12/25, 142 yards, 2 INT
- DEN – Steve Ramsey – 9/16, 179 yards, INT

**Top rushers**

- SDG – Don Woods – 11 rushes, 46 yards
- DEN – Otis Armstrong – 23 rushes, 91 yards

**Top receivers**

- SDG – Charlie Joiner – 5 receptions, 105 yards
- DEN – Riley Odoms – 2 receptions, 57 yards

The Chargers were shut out as they lost their first game of the season. A 42-yard completion from Fouts to Joiner gave San Diego a chance to open the scoring in the opening quarter, but Fritsch hit the right upright with a 28-yard field goal attempt, and the Chargers didn't advance past the Denver 36 yard line again. San Diego had multiple problems on special teams: The Broncos blocked one punt, Rick Upchurch ran another back 92 yards for a touchdown, and a fumbled kickoff return by Owens led to the game's only offensive touchdown.

After throwing six touchdowns and no interceptions in the first three weeks, Fouts finished this game completing 12 of 25 passes for 142 yards and a pair of interceptions. Joiner accounted for most of the Chargers' receiving game, with 5 catches for 105 yards. The game matched the two highest scoring teams in the league over the first three weeks of the season.

==== Week 5: vs. Oakland Raiders ====
Week Five: Oakland Raiders at San Diego Chargers – Game summary

Quarter	1	2	3	4	Total
**Raiders**	7	7	0	13	**27**
Chargers	7	0	3	7	**17**

at San Diego Stadium, San Diego, California

- Date: October 10
- Game time: 1:00 p.m. PDT
- Game weather: 75 °F (23.9 °C), relative humidity 49%, wind 6 miles per hour (9.7 km/h; 5.2 kn)
- Game attendance: 50,523
- Referee: Pat Haggerty
- TV announcers (NBC): Ross Porter and Paul Maguire
- Box score

Game information

**First quarter**

- SDG – Bo Matthews offensive fumble recovery in end zone (Toni Fritsch kick), 6:27. Chargers 7–0. **Drive: 10 plays, 45 yards, 4:38.**
- OAK – Dave Casper 4-yard pass from Ken Stabler (Fred Steinfort kick), 2:02. Tied 7–7. **Drive: 11 plays, 74 yards, 4:11.**

**Second quarter**

- OAK – Cliff Branch 74-yard pass from Ken Stabler (Fred Steinfort kick), 11:49. Raiders 14–7. **Drive: 4 plays, 86 yards, 1:55.**

**Third quarter**

- SDG – Toni Fritsch 45-yard field goal, 11:09. Raiders 14–10. **Drive: 12 plays, 52 yards, 3:51.**

**Fourth quarter**

- SDG – Mercury Morris 1-yard run (Toni Fritsch kick), 10:54. Chargers 17–14. **Drive: 7 plays, 59 yards, 3:52.**
- OAK – Cliff Branch 41-yard pass from Ken Stabler (Fred Steinfort kick), 9:54. Raiders 21–17. **Drive: 2 plays, 69 yards, 0:49.**
- OAK – Pete Banaszak 4-yard run (kick failed), 5:15. Raiders 27–17. **Drive: 6 plays, 43 yards, 3:23.**

**Top passers**

- OAK – Ken Stabler – 20/26, 339 yards, 3 TD, INT
- SDG – Dan Fouts – 16/31, 249 yards, INT

**Top rushers**

- OAK – Mark van Eeghen – 18 rushes, 78 yards
- SDG – Rickey Young – 14 rushes, 67 yards

**Top receivers**

- OAK – Cliff Branch – 5 receptions, 167 yards, 2 TD
- SDG – Charlie Joiner – 5 receptions, 108 yards

San Diego played a close game against the eventual Super Bowl champions, but Oakland pulled away in the final quarter. The Chargers took the lead on their opening drive, Young converting a pair of 3rd downs with runs, then fumbling the ball into the end zone on 3rd and goal from the 2; Matthews recovered for a touchdown. Ken Stabler threw touchdown passes on the next two Raider drives, the second of these a 74-yarder to Cliff Branch. With San Diego failing to cross midfield on four consecutive possessions, Oakland led 14–7 at halftime.

The Chargers moved the ball from their own 20 to the Oakland 28 on the first possession of the second half, and Fritsch converted a 45-yard field goal try. As the 3rd quarter went on, Hoopes twice pinned the Raiders inside their own 10 with punts, and the Charger defense each time forced a three-and-out. After the second of these, the San Diego drove 59 yards in 7 plays, and took the lead with 11 minutes to play on a 1-yard run by Morris. Oakland responded in only two plays, Stabler completing a pair of passes for 69 yards, the latter to Branch for the touchdown that restored the Raider lead. After a San Diego three-and-out, Oakland had another quick touchdown drive, and Fouts was intercepted soon afterwards to help decide the game.

Joiner had 5 catches for 108 yards, his third consecutive 100-yard game.

==== Week 6: vs. Houston Oilers ====
Week Six: Houston Oilers at San Diego Chargers – Game summary

Quarter	1	2	3	4	Total
Oilers	3	3	7	14	**27**
**Chargers**	0	7	10	13	**30**

at San Diego Stadium, San Diego, California

- Date: October 17
- Game time: 1:00 p.m. PDT
- Game weather: 71 °F (21.7 °C), relative humidity 76%, wind 10 miles per hour (16 km/h; 8.7 kn)
- Game attendance: 31,565
- Referee: Jim Tunney
- TV announcers (NBC): Charlie Jones and Sam DeLuca
- Box score

Game information

**First quarter**

- HOU – Skip Butler 31-yard field goal, 8:01. Oilers 3–0. **Drive: 8 plays, 32 yards, 2:58.**

**Second quarter**

- SDG – Dwight McDonald 13-yard pass from Dan Fouts (Ray Wersching kick), 7:46. Chargers 7–3. **Drive: 10 plays, 67 yards, 4:47.**
- HOU – Skip Butler 36-yard field goal, 2:01. Chargers 7–6. **Drive: 6 plays, 13 yards, 2:10.**

**Third quarter**

- SDG – Ray Wersching 30-yard field goal, 9:26. Chargers 10–6. **Drive: 15 plays, 52 yards, 5:34.**
- SDG – Bo Matthews 42-yard run (Ray Wersching kick), 5:39. Chargers 17–6. **Drive: 3 plays, 65 yards, 0:51.**
- HOU – Ken Burrough 54-yard pass from Dan Pastorini (Skip Butler kick), 4:44. Chargers 17–13. **Drive: 2 plays, 67 yards, 0:55.**

**Fourth quarter**

- SDG – Charlie Joiner 81-yard pass from Dan Fouts (Ray Wersching kick), 13:58. Chargers 24–13. **Drive: 2 plays, 83 yards, 0:52.**
- HOU – Ken Burrough 67-yard pass from Dan Pastorini (Skip Butler kick), 12:32. Chargers 24–20. **Drive: 3 plays, 75 yards, 1:26.**
- HOU – Billy Johnson 32-yard pass from Dan Pastorini (Skip Butler kick), 6:03. Oilers 27–24. **Drive: 6 plays, 49 yards, 2:19.**
- SDG – Bo Matthews 1-yard run (kick failed), 1:58. Chargers 30–27. **Drive: 7 plays, 60 yards, 4:05.**

**Top passers**

- HOU – Dan Pastorini – 25/39, 329 yards, 3 TD, INT
- SDG – Dan Fouts – 19/24, 279 yards, 2 TD

**Top rushers**

- HOU – Ronnie Coleman – 11 rushes, 28 yards
- SDG – Sam Scarber – 17 rushes, 78 yards

**Top receivers**

- HOU – Ken Burrough – 5 receptions, 136 yards, 2 TD
- SDG – Charlie Joiner – 2 receptions, 106 yards, TD

A late Matthews touchdown gave San Diego victory in a game featuring five touchdowns of 30+ yards. The game featured three turnovers, all occurring in the space of five plays early in the game: Scarber lost a fumble in Oilers territory, Dan Pastorini was intercepted by Goode on the following play, and Fouts was intercepted after a further three plays. Houston then drove for a field goal. In the 2nd quarter, the Oilers missed another field goal attempt, and San Diego drove 67 yards to take the lead. Scarber converted a pair of 3rd downs, and MacDonald caught a 13-yard touchdown pass. After another Houston field goal was good, the Chargers led 7–6 at halftime.

The Chargers reached 1st and goal on the Houston 4 on the opening drive of the second half, but Fouts was sacked twice and they had to settle for a Wersching field goal. Their next drive covered 65 yards in 3 running plays: Scarber gained 13 and 10 yards before Matthews ran over a tackler and broke away for a 42-yard touchdown. Pastorini responded with a 54-yard touchdown only two plays later. The teams exchanged punts, and San Diego faced a 2nd and 8 from their own 19 early in the 4th quarter. Fouts threw a low pass to Joiner near the right sideline. The receiver dropped to the ground to make the catch, but got up before the Oilers could touch him and raced upfield for an 81-yard touchdown; it would prove to be the longest of Joiner's 47 touchdowns in San Diego, as well as the longest of Fouts' 254 touchdown passes. The Chargers led 24–13, but Houston again responded quickly, Pastorini throwing a 67-yard touchdown three plays later. San Diego then reached a 4th and 17 on their own 39 yard, whereupon Hoopes made a dubious decision, running instead of punting and gaining only 10 yards. Houston took over possession and went ahead with six minutes to play, Pastorini throwing a 32-yard touchdown on 4th and 5. Fouts then led an 8-play, 60-yard drive, completing passes of 25 yards to Young and 27 to Curran. Matthews scored the winning touchdown on 3rd and goal from the 1, with 1:58 to play. After Houston could only gain 2 yards before turning the ball over on downs, Matthews converted a 4th and 1 with a 10-yard run and San Diego ran the clock out.

Fouts completed 19 of 24 passes for 279 yards, 2 touchdowns and no interceptions. The trio of running backs, Scarber, Young and Matthews, combined for over 200 rushing yards (with two touchdowns) and nearly 100 receiving yards. Joiner caught 2 passes for 106 yards and a touchdown. He became the second Charger to have a four-game 100-yard receiving streak, Lance Alworth having accomplished the feat three times previously.

==== Week 7: at Cleveland Browns ====
Week Seven: San Diego Chargers at Cleveland Browns – Game summary

Quarter	1	2	3	4	Total
Chargers	0	14	3	0	**17**
**Browns**	14	0	0	7	**21**

at Cleveland Municipal Stadium, Cleveland, Ohio

- Date: October 24
- Game time: 1:00 p.m. EDT
- Game weather: 46 °F (7.8 °C), relative humidity 90%, wind 12 miles per hour (19 km/h; 10 kn)
- Game attendance: 60,018
- Referee: Gene Barth
- TV announcers (NBC): Jack Buck and Len Dawson
- Box score

Game information

**First quarter**

- CLE – Reggie Rucker 3-yard pass from Brian Sipe (Don Cockroft kick), 6:29. Browns 7–0. **Drive: 10 plays, 63 yards, 4:12.**
- CLE – Greg Pruitt 1-yard run (Don Cockroft kick), 2:07. Browns 14–0. **Drive: 6 plays, 27 yards, 2:48.**

**Second quarter**

- SDG – Charlie Joiner 16-yard pass from Dan Fouts (Ray Wersching kick), 1:54. Browns 14–7. **Drive: 8 plays, 70 yards, 3:13.**
- SDG – Sam Scarber 11-yard pass from Don Woods (Ray Wersching kick), 0:12. Tied 14–14. **Drive: 4 plays, 39 yards, 0:39.**

**Third quarter**

- SDG – Ray Wersching 22-yard field goal, 9:48. Chargers 17–14. **Drive: 9 plays, 52 yards, 5:12.**

**Fourth quarter**

- CLE – Oscar Roan 10-yard pass from Brian Sipe (Don Cockroft kick), 14:10. Browns 21–17. **Drive: 9 plays, 82 yards, 4:17.**

**Top passers**

- SDG – Dan Fouts – 23/35, 235 yards, TD, INT
- CLE – Brian Sipe – 23/28, 246 yards, 2 TD, 2 INT

**Top rushers**

- SDG – Rickey Young – 14 rushes, 48 yards
- CLE – Larry Poole – 16 rushes, 64 yards

**Top receivers**

- SDG – Charlie Joiner – 5 receptions, 94 yards, TD
- CLE – Paul Warfield – 5 receptions, 76 yards

San Diego overcame an early 14–0 deficit, but were unable to hold on to a final-quarter lead against the Browns. Cleveland took their early lead with back-to-back touchdown drives before the Chargers had registered a first down. Each team then missed a field goal, before San Diego began their comeback with a 70-yard drive featuring catches of 29 and 16 yards by Joiner, the latter for a touchdown. Leroy Jones intercepted Brian Sipe on the following drive, setting the Chargers up on Cleveland's 39 yard line with 51 seconds remaining in the half. On the next three plays, Young swept for 8 yards and Fouts hit Joiner for 20, before almost being intercepted at the goal line. With 18 seconds left, the Chargers used a trick play to score, with Woods taking a handoff and starting to the right before pulling up and throwing to Scarber in the end zone, tying the score at 14–14 going into halftime.

After receiving the second half kickoff, San Diego took the lead with their third consecutive scoring drive, though they settled for a field goal after Scarber was stopped a yard short on 3rd and 2 from the 6. They had an excellent chance to extend their lead when Bob Horn intercepted Sipe in Cleveland territory on the next play from scrimmage, but Fouts was intercepted in turn after only two further plays. Cleveland retook the lead with 14 minutes to play when Sipe capped an 82-yard drive with his second touchdown pass of the game. The Chargers best chance after that was foiled when a Fouts pass on 4th and 9 from the Cleveland 30 was knocked away in the end zone with 3:27 to play. They had one more drive, but ran out of time with the ball on their own 48 yard line.

Joiner narrowly failed to extend his 100 yards receiving streak, catching 5 passes for 94 yards and a touchdown.

==== Week 8: at Pittsburgh Steelers ====
Week Eight: San Diego Chargers at Pittsburgh Steelers – Game summary

Quarter	1	2	3	4	Total
Chargers	0	0	0	0	**0**
**Steelers**	0	3	0	20	**23**

at Three Rivers Stadium, Pittsburgh, Pennsylvania

- Date: October 31
- Game time: 1:00 p.m. EST
- Game weather: 44 °F (6.7 °C), relative humidity 86%, wind 14 miles per hour (23 km/h; 12 kn)
- Game attendance: 45,484
- Referee: Tommy Bell
- TV announcers (NBC): Jim Simpson and Len Dawson
- Box score

Game information

**First quarter**

- No scoring plays.

**Second quarter**

- PIT – Roy Gerela 36-yard field goal, 8:06. Steelers 3–0. **Drive: 4 plays, 9 yards, 1:12.**

**Third quarter**

- No scoring plays.

**Fourth quarter**

- PIT – Terry Bradshaw 1-yard run (Roy Gerela kick), 8:31. Steelers 10–0. **Drive: 10 plays, 68 yards, 4:33.**
- PIT – Ernie Pough 11-yard pass from Terry Bradshaw (Roy Gerela kick), 3:18. Steelers 17–0. **Drive: 7 plays, 64 yards, 3:59.**
- PIT – John Fuqua 3-yard run (kick failed), 1:45. Steelers 23–0. **Drive: 4 plays, 27 yards, 1:06.**

**Top passers**

- SDG – Dan Fouts – 10/28, 122 yards, INT
- PIT – Terry Bradshaw – 9/19, 104 yards, TD, INT

**Top rushers**

- SDG – Rickey Young – 10 rushes, 22 yards
- PIT – Reggie Harrison – 13 rushes, 108 yards

**Top receivers**

- SDG – Charlie Joiner – 4 receptions, 98 yards
- PIT – Ernie Pough – 3 receptions, 29 yards, TD
  PIT – Randy Grossman – 2 receptions, 29 yards

San Diego were shut out by the defending Super Bowl champion Steelers for the second consecutive season, though they kept the game close until the 4th quarter. The teams opened the game with three punts each, before Morris lost a fumble in his own territory. That mistake didn't lead to any points, as Lowe recovered a Franco Harris fumble two plays later; Fouts then found Joiner for a 43-yard completion, but the Chargers were forced to punt after three more plays. Later, Hoopes mishandled a snap, leading to a Pittsburgh field goal — the only points of the first half.

The Charger defense continued to keep them in the game in the 3rd quarter, with Hal Stringert intercepting Terry Bradshaw, and Preston recovering a fumble at his own 21. Pittsburgh broke through in the final quarter, however, Bradshaw scoring from a yard out with 8:31 to play. Fuller returned the ensuing kickoff 47 yards to the Steeler 43, and San Diego progressed to a 4th and 3 from the 36 — their best field position all day. Fouts then threw incomplete, and Pittsburgh added further touchdowns on their next two possessions.

San Diego committed 5 turnovers to the Pittsburgh's 3 while producing 7 first downs to Pittsburgh's 20. They were also outgained by 361 yards to 134; Joiner accounted for most of their offense, with 4 catches for 98 yards.

==== Week 9: vs. Baltimore Colts ====
Week Nine: Baltimore Colts at San Diego Chargers – Game summary

Quarter	1	2	3	4	Total
**Colts**	7	14	7	9	**37**
Chargers	0	7	0	14	**21**

at San Diego Stadium, San Diego, California

- Date: November 7
- Game time: 1:00 p.m. PST
- Game weather: 70 °F (21.1 °C), relative humidity 41%, wind 6 miles per hour (9.7 km/h; 5.2 kn)
- Game attendance: 42,827
- Referee: Ben Dreith
- TV announcers (NBC): Jack Buck and Mike Haffner
- Box score

Game information

**First quarter**

- BAL – Lydell Mitchell 40-yard pass from Bert Jones (Toni Linhart kick), 3:12. Colts 7–0. **Drive: 7 plays, 80 yards, 3:17.**

**Second quarter**

- BAL – Don McCauley 2-yard run (Toni Linhart kick), 11:37. Colts 14–0. **Drive: 10 plays, 67 yards, 4:47.**
- SDG – Don Woods 5-yard run (Ray Wersching kick), 7:57. Colts 14–7. **Drive: 7 plays, 81 yards, 3:31.**
- BAL – Roger Carr 16-yard pass from Bert Jones (Toni Linhart kick), 3:27. Colts 21–7. **Drive: 8 plays, 80 yards, 4:23.**

**Third quarter**

- BAL – Roger Carr 18-yard pass from Bert Jones (Toni Linhart kick), 10:51. Colts 28–7. **Drive: 8 plays, 74 yards, 4:09.**

**Fourth quarter**

- BAL – Toni Linhart 39-yard field goal, 14:37. Colts 31–7. **Drive: 12 plays, 54 yards, 4:40.**
- BAL – Bill Troup 6-yard run (kick blocked), 6:55. Colts 37–7. **Drive: 11 plays, 69 yards, 5:45.**
- SDG – Artie Owens 28-yard pass from Clint Longley (Ray Wersching kick), 4:14. Colts 37–14. **Drive: 6 plays, 72 yards, 2:31.**
- SDG – Dwight McDonald 10-yard pass from Clint Longley (Mike Fuller run), 1:47. Colts 37–21. **Drive: 8 plays, 35 yards, 2:18.**

**Top passers**

- BAL – Bert Jones – 18/25, 275 yards, 3 TD, INT
- SDG – Dan Fouts – 14/25, 171 yards

**Top rushers**

- BAL – Lydell Mitchell – 17 rushes, 91 yards
- SDG – Don Woods – 11 rushes, 29 yards, TD

**Top receivers**

- BAL – Lydell Mitchell – 8 receptions, 125 yards, TD
- SDG – Pat Curran – 4 receptions, 61 yards

San Diego were dominated for most of the game by the AFC East-leading Colts. Baltimore drove 80 yards on their second possession, taking the lead on a 40-yard touchdown pass from Bert Jones to Lydell Mitchell, and added a second touchdown on their next possession. The Chargers then briefly recovered, Fouts completing all four of his passes for 54 yards on a 7-play, 81-yard drive that Woods capped with a 5-yard touchdown run. The Colts, however came straight back with another 80-yard touchdown drive, and led 21–7 at halftime. They stretched the advantage to 30 points midway through the final quarter before Clint Longley came in for Fouts and threw late touchdowns to Owens and McDonald.

Fouts completed 14 of 25 passes for 171 yards, while Longley was 8 of 11 for 90 yards and the two touchdowns. Mitchell, who gained over 200 yards rushing and receiving, joined the Chargers two seasons later.

==== Week 10: vs. Denver Broncos ====
Week Ten: Denver Broncos at San Diego Chargers – Game summary

Quarter	1	2	3	4	Total
**Broncos**	0	7	3	7	**17**
Chargers	0	0	0	0	**0**

at San Diego Stadium, San Diego, California

- Date: November 14
- Game time: 1:00 p.m. PST
- Game weather: 64 °F (17.8 °C), relative humidity 66%, wind 6 miles per hour (9.7 km/h; 5.2 kn)
- Game attendance: 32,017
- Referee: Chuck Heberling
- TV announcers (NBC): Jay Randolph and Floyd Little
- Box score

Game information

**First quarter**

- No scoring plays.

**Second quarter**

- DEN – Rick Upchurch 59-yard pass from Steve Ramsey (Jim Turner kick), 13:15. Broncos 7–0. **Drive: 4 plays, 80 yards, 2:51.**

**Third quarter**

- DEN – Jim Turner 42-yard field goal, 6:52. Broncos 10–0. **Drive: 5 plays, 14 yards, 1:25.**

**Fourth quarter**

- DEN – Tom Jackson 46-yard interception return (Jim Turner kick), 1:49. Broncos 17–0.

**Top passers**

- DEN – Steve Ramsey – 19/34, 224 yards, TD, INT
- SDG – Dan Fouts – 12/22, 120 yards, 2 INT

**Top rushers**

- DEN – Otis Armstrong – 13 rushes, 35 yards
- SDG – Mercury Morris – 4 rushes, 14 yards

**Top receivers**

- DEN – Otis Armstrong – 8 receptions, 74 yards
- SDG – Charlie Joiner – 3 receptions, 59 yards

A good defensive performance was wasted as San Diego were again shut out by Denver. The Chargers had a good chance to opening the scoring in the 1st quarter, after a Graham interception set them up at the Denver 30. They progressed to a 1st and 10 at the 19, whereupon Fouts was intercepted. The Broncos then drove 80 yards in just 4 plays, with Upchurch scoring on a 59-yard catch and run. The Chargers offered little threat for the rest of the half; Longley came on in the final minute, but was immediately intercepted.

Fouts returned in the 3rd quarter, but his first two drives were three-and-outs, while Denver extended their lead to 10–0 with a field goal. Late in the quarter, Kelcher recovered a fumble at the Denver 46. Aided by Joiner's 37-yard catch on 3rd and 15, the Chargers reached a 3rd and goal at the 1, but Matthews fumbled and the Broncos recovered. Midway through the final quarter, San Diego drove to the Denver 25, but Fouts was intercepted to end their final serious scoring threat. Longley came back in for the final two Charger drives, but was intercepted twice more, the first of these being returned for a touchdown.

San Diego had only 8 first downs and 128 total yards, while turning the ball over a season-high six times, including five interceptions.

==== Week 11: at Buffalo Bills ====
Week Eleven: San Diego Chargers at Buffalo Bills – Game summary

Quarter	1	2	3	4	Total
**Chargers**	14	13	7	0	**34**
Bills	3	7	3	0	**13**

at Rich Stadium, Buffalo, New York

- Date: November 21
- Game time: 1:00 p.m. EST
- Game weather: 29 °F (−1.7 °C), relative humidity 80%, wind 9 miles per hour (14 km/h; 7.8 kn), wind chill 20 °F (−6.7 °C)
- Game attendance: 36,539
- Referee: Don Wedge
- TV announcers (NBC): Ross Porter and Mike Haffner
- Box score

Game information

**First quarter**

- SDG – Don Woods 13-yard run (Ray Wersching kick), 13:21. Chargers 7–0. **Drive: 4 plays, 68 yards, 1:39.**
- BUF – George Jakowenko 29-yard field goal, 7:31. Chargers 7–3. **Drive: 13 plays, 60 yards, 5:50.**
- SDG – Charlie Joiner 5-yard pass from Dan Fouts (Ray Wersching kick), 3:01. Chargers 14–3. **Drive: 9 plays, 72 yards, 4:30.**

**Second quarter**

- SDG – Charlie Joiner 30-yard pass from Dan Fouts (Ray Wersching kick), 11:15. Chargers 21–3. **Drive: 2 plays, 44 yards, 0:48.**
- BUF – John Holland fumble recovery in end zone (George Jakowenko kick), 7:51. Chargers 21–10.
- SDG – Ray Wersching 35-yard field goal, 2:08. Chargers 24–10. **Drive: 6 plays, 55 yards, 2:28.**
- SDG – Ray Wersching 45-yard fair catch kick, 0:00. Chargers 27–10. **Drive: 0 plays, 0 yards, 0:00.**

**Third quarter**

- BUF – George Jakowenko 42-yard field goal, 7:05. Chargers 27–13. **Drive: 4 plays, 7 yards, 1:39.**
- SDG – Rickey Young 13-yard run (Ray Wersching kick), 0:59. Chargers 34–13. **Drive: 2 plays, 61 yards, 0:16.**

**Fourth quarter**

- No scoring plays.

**Top passers**

- SDG – Dan Fouts – 19/29, 200 yards, 2 TD, 3 INT
- BUF – Gary Marangi – 8/30, 83 yards, 3 INT

**Top rushers**

- SDG – Rickey Young – 11 rushes, 82 yards, TD
- BUF – O. J. Simpson – 25 rushes, 118 yards

**Top receivers**

- SDG – Charlie Joiner – 6 receptions, 97 yards, 2 TD
- BUF – Bob Chandler – 3 receptions, 40 yards

Two early touchdowns helped the Chargers end their four-game losing streak. Fouts opened the game with a 29-yard completion to Curran, and Woods ran the ball in from 13 yards out three plays later. After Buffalo responded with a field goal, San Diego drove for another touchdown: Joiner had back-to-back receptions of 23 and 15 yards, Woods swept for 24 yards, and Joiner scored on a 5-yard pass from Fouts. While Fouts was intercepted in Buffalo territory on the next drive, Fuller's 43-yard punt return soon had San Diego threatening again, and Fouts found Joiner in stride for a 30-yard touchdown pass and a 21–3 lead. The Bills scored their only touchdown of the game when a snap went far over West's head and was recovered in the end zone by Buffalo. Late in the first half, Young swept for 44 yards and Wersching made a 35-yard field goal. A Mike Williams interception gave the Chargers another scoring chance in the final two minutes, but Fouts was sacked and they were forced to punt.

West pinned Buffalo at their own 5, and they lost a yard on the next three plays, forcing them to punt with five seconds left. Williams made a fair catch at the Buffalo 35 as time expired in the half. This allowed Wersching to attempt a fair catch kick, which he converted from 45 yards out. A successful fair catch kick in the NFL was not made again until 2024.

Fouts was intercepted on the first two Charger drives of the second half. After the first of these, Johnson stopped O. J. Simpson a yard short on 4th and 2; after the second, Buffalo pulled the score back to 27–13 with a field goal. Late in the 3rd quarter, McDonald drew a 48-yard defensive pass interference penalty, moving the ball to the Bills' 13. Young scored from there two plays later, giving San Diego a 21-point lead they easily maintained throughout a scoreless final quarter.

Joiner had 6 catches for 97 yards and 2 touchdowns, while Young rushed 11 times for 82 yards and a touchdown and caught 4 passes for 20 more yards. Opposition quarterback Gary Marangi completed 8 of 30 passes for 83 yards, with no touchdowns and 3 interceptions, for a passer rating of 0.0. As of 2022, this is the most passes attempted by an NFL player while producing a 0.0 rating.

==== Week 12: vs. Kansas City Chiefs ====
Week Twelve: Kansas City Chiefs at San Diego Chargers – Game summary

Quarter	1	2	3	4	Total
**Chiefs**	10	0	3	10	**23**
Chargers	7	6	0	7	**20**

at San Diego Stadium, San Diego, California

- Date: November 28
- Game time: 1:00 p.m. PST
- Game weather: 53 °F (11.7 °C), relative humidity 25%, wind 5 miles per hour (8.0 km/h; 4.3 kn)
- Game attendance: 29,272
- Referee: Red Cashion
- TV announcers (NBC): Ross Porter and Lionel Aldridge
- Box score

Game information

**First quarter**

- SDG – Don Woods 3-yard pass from Dan Fouts (Ray Wersching kick), 10:46. Chargers 7–0. **Drive: 9 plays, 80 yards, 4:14.**
- KAN – Ed Podolak 5-yard run (Jan Stenerud kick), 6:38. Tied 7–7. **Drive: 9 plays, 69 yards, 4:08.**
- KAN – Jan Stenerud 40-yard field goal, 3:48. Chiefs 10–7. **Drive: 7 plays, 15 yards, 1:16.**

**Second quarter**

- SDG – Rickey Young 6-yard pass from Dan Fouts (kick failed), 6:11. Chargers 13–10. **Drive: 11 plays, 70 yards, 6:18.**

**Third quarter**

- KAN – Jan Stenerud 28-yard field goal, 9:05. Tied 13–13. **Drive: 10 plays, 60 yards, 5:55.**

**Fourth quarter**

- KAN – Jan Stenerud 26-yard field goal, 13:25. Chiefs 16–13. **Drive: 13 plays, 75 yards, 5:30.**
- SDG – Charlie Joiner 13-yard pass from Dan Fouts (Ray Wersching kick), 7:04. Chargers 20–16. **Drive: 12 plays, 80 yards, 6:21.**
- KAN – Ed Podolak 5-yard run (Jan Stenerud kick), 5:14. Chiefs 23–20. **Drive: 5 plays, 84 yards, 1:50.**

**Top passers**

- KAN – Mike Livingston – 14/27, 195 yards, INT
- SDG – Dan Fouts – 18/32, 218 yards, 3 TD, 3 INT

**Top rushers**

- KAN – Ed Podolak – 25 rushes, 127 yards, 2 TD
- SDG – Rickey Young – 16 rushes, 90 yards

**Top receivers**

- KAN – Larry Brunson – 3 receptions, 86 yards
- SDG – Don Woods – 7 receptions, 79 yards, TD

The Chargers lost a back-and-forth game to a late Ed Podolak touchdown. Fouts started the game's opening drive with a 25-yard completion to Young, and finished it with a 3-yard touchdown to Woods on 3rd and goal. The Chiefs answered in kind on their first drive, and Podolak tied the score with a 5-yard run. Starting on the next possession, Fouts was intercepted on three consecutive pass attempts: the first of these led to a Jan Stenerud field goal, but the latter two were answered by a Fuller interception and a Fletcher fumble recovery. The next Charger drive also ended in a turnover, Woods fumbling at the end of a 34-yard catch and run. San Diego forced a punt, and ran the ball nine consecutive times to move from their own 30 to a 2nd and goal at the Kansas City 6. After an incompletion, Fouts found Young for a go-ahead touchdown. Wersching missed the extra point, but the Chargers reached halftime 13–10 ahead.

In the second half, Stenerud made a pair of short field goals, the latter putting Kansas City ahead early in the final quarter. The Chargers responded with a 12-play, 80-yard drive capped by Fouts' 13-yard touchdown pass to Joiner on 2nd and 12. The Chiefs responded quickly, driving 80 yards in only five plays, with Podolak scoring from the 5. With under five minutes to play, Young converted a 4th and 1 at his own 38 with a 4-yard carry, and Fouts found Joiner for 15 yards on the next play, but the Chargers punted after Fouts was sacked for a 10-yard loss on 3rd and 4 from the Kansas City 37. The Charger defense forced a punt, and Fuller's 27-yard punt return put the ball at the Kansas City 46, but Fouts threw four straight incompletions, the last with 5 seconds to play.

Fouts completed 18 of 32 passes for 218 yards, with 3 touchdowns and 3 interceptions. Young rushed 16 times for 90 yards and caught 3 passes for 45 yards and a touchdown; Woods rushed 15 times for 68 yards and caught 7 passes for 79 yards and a touchdown.

==== Week 13: vs. San Francisco 49ers ====
Week Thirteen: San Francisco 49ers at San Diego Chargers – Game summary

Quarter	1	2	3	4	OT	Total
49ers	0	0	0	7	0	**7**
**Chargers**	0	0	0	7	6	**13**

at San Diego Stadium, San Diego, California

- Date: December 5
- Game time: 1:00 p.m. PST
- Game weather: 63 °F (17.2 °C), relative humidity 65%, wind 8 miles per hour (13 km/h; 7.0 kn)
- Game attendance: 33,539
- Referee: Dick Jorgensen
- TV announcers (CBS): Vin Scully and Paul Hornung
- Box score

Game information

**First quarter**

- No scoring plays.

**Second quarter**

- No scoring plays.

**Third quarter**

- No scoring plays.

**Fourth quarter**

- SDG – Bo Matthews 2-yard run (Ray Wersching kick), 5:02. Chargers 7–0. **Drive: 16 plays, 80 yards, 8:38.**
- SF – Paul Hofer 13-yard pass from Scott Bull (Steve Mike-Mayer kick), 1:19. Tied 7–7. **Drive: 8 plays, 64 yards, 3:43.**

**Overtime**

- SDG – Mercury Morris 13-yard run, 9:48. Chargers 13–7. **Drive: 9 plays, 93 yards, 5:12.**

**Top passers**

- SF – Jim Plunkett – 7/13, 55 yards, INT
- SDG – Dan Fouts – 9/14, 99 yards

**Top rushers**

- SF – Delvin Williams – 26 rushes, 104 yards
- SDG – Rickey Young – 14 rushes, 78 yards

**Top receivers**

- SF – Jim Lash – 3 receptions, 56 yards
- SDG – Rickey Young – 5 receptions, 62 yards

Morris scored an overtime touchdown to win a game that was scoreless for almost 55 minutes. Longley started in place of Fouts, but San Diego gained only one first down in total over their first four drives, punting each time. The 49ers, in the meantime, went three-and-out three times in a row, before making some progress on their fourth drive – they got in range for a 45-yard field goal, but Steve Mike-Mayer missed wide to the right. After another Charger punt, Williams made an interception and set his offense up at the San Francisco 23. They lost three yards, and Wersching was wide left on a 43-yard field goal attempt. San Francisco then embarked on a 14-play, 50-yard drive that ended with a field goal attempt after Lowe sacked Jim Plunkett on 3rd down. Leroy Jones blocked Mike-Mayer's kick, and the score was 0–0 at halftime.

Fouts replaced Longley at quarterback in a halftime switch. The 49ers received the opening kickoff of the second half, and drove in range for another Mike-Mayer field goal attempt – this one struck the right upright from 29 yards out. Following an exchange of punts, Wersching got another chance, but was short from 52 yards, making the two kickers a combined 0 of 5 on the game. After forcing a punt, the Chargers put together a 16-play, 80-yard touchdown drive that took over eight minutes. Four times during the drive, they converted 3rd downs with runs, including two scrambles by Fouts. Matthews finished the drive with a 2-yard touchdown run with 5:02 to play. The 49ers came straight back with an 8-play, 64-yard touchdown drive. Mike-Mayer's extra point was blocked, but Graham was flagged for defensive offsides, and the kicker converted his second attempt with 1:19 to play. Neither side crossed midfield on their final possessions of regulation, and the game went to overtime.

San Diego won the coin toss, and elected to receive; a clipping penalty on Scarber caused them to start out at their own 7 yard line. Young began the drive with back-to-back runs of 11 and 10 yards, then Fouts converted a 3rd and 2 with a 30-yard completion to Joiner. Further carries of 4 and 15 yards from Young helped the Chargers reach a 2nd and 8 from the 49er 13, from where Morris broke around left end and raced in for the winning touchdown, benefitting from a key block by Billy Shields along the way.

It was the third time San Diego had played an overtime game, and their first win in the extra period. In Longley's lone start as a Charger, he completed 3 of 7 pass attempts for 30 yards, while being sacked 4 times for the loss of 32 yards. Young rushed 14 times for 78 yards, and caught 5 passes for 62 yards.

==== Week 14: at Oakland Raiders ====
Week Fourteen: San Diego Chargers at Oakland Raiders – Game summary

Quarter	1	2	3	4	Total
Chargers	0	0	0	0	**0**
**Raiders**	7	10	7	0	**24**

at Oakland-Alameda County Coliseum, Oakland, California

- Date: December 12
- Game time: 1:00 p.m. PST
- Game weather: 49 °F (9.4 °C), relative humidity 71%, wind 5 miles per hour (8.0 km/h; 4.3 kn)
- Game attendance: 50,102
- Referee: Jim Tunney
- TV announcers (NBC): Ross Porter and Mike Haffner
- Box score

Game information

**First quarter**

- OAK – Cliff Branch 5-yard pass from Mike Rae (Errol Mann kick), 9:19. Raiders 7–0. **Drive: 8 plays, 42 yards, 4:08.**

**Second quarter**

- OAK – Dave Casper 6-yard pass from Mike Rae (Errol Mann kick), 7:03. Raiders 14–0. **Drive: 16 plays, 88 yards, 9:01.**
- OAK – Errol Mann 42-yard field goal, 0:20. Raiders 17–0. **Drive: 7 plays, 25 yards, 1:39.**

**Third quarter**

- OAK – Morris Bradshaw 25-yard pass from Mike Rae (Errol Mann kick), 2:35. Raiders 24–0. **Drive: 6 plays, 43 yards, 2:32.**

**Fourth quarter**

- No scoring plays.

**Top passers**

- SDG – Dan Fouts – 10/25, 82 yards, 2 INT
- OAK – Mike Rae – 13/22, 143 yards, 3 TD

**Top rushers**

- SDG – Rickey Young – 15 rushes, 75 yards
- OAK – Mark van Eeghen – 22 rushes, 95 yards

**Top receivers**

- SDG – Sam Scarber – 5 receptions, 31 yards
- OAK – Mike Siani – 2 receptions, 38 yards

San Diego ended their season being shut out for the fourth time since their 3–0 start. They had nine possessions through the first three quarters, reaching Oakland territory just once, when Fuller returned a 1st quarter punt 16 yards to the Oakland 47. That drive ended in a punt after the Chargers could move the ball only three yards. Oakland, meanwhile, scored a touchdown on their opening drive and opened up a 24–0 lead late in the 3rd quarter. The Chargers then had their best chance to score, with Young breaking off consecutive 18- and 19-yard runs up the middle and Morris going around left end for 20 more. They reached a 3rd and 9 from the Oakland 15, but Fouts was intercepted in the end zone.

Fouts completed 10 of 25 passes for 82 yards, with 2 interceptions and a 15.7 passer rating.

=== Standings ===
AFC West
	W	L	T	PCT	DIV	CONF	PF	PA	STK
^{(1)} Oakland Raiders	13	1	0	.929	7–0	10–1	350	237	W10
Denver Broncos	9	5	0	.643	5–2	7–5	315	206	W2
San Diego Chargers	6	8	0	.429	2–5	4–8	248	285	L1
Kansas City Chiefs	5	9	0	.357	2–5	4–8	290	376	W1
Tampa Bay Buccaneers	0	14	0	.000	0–4	0–13	125	412	L14

== Awards ==
Only one Charger was named to the 1977 Pro Bowl, with Joiner a reserve on the AFC squad; none were selected for the Associated Press All-Pro team.
