= 1977 San Diego Chargers season =

1977 NFL team season

- Owner: Eugene V. Klein
- General manager: Johnny Sanders
- Head coach: Tommy Prothro
- Home stadium: San Diego Stadium

Results
- Record: 7–7
- Division place: 3rd AFC West
- Playoffs: Did not qualify
- All-Pros: 1: DT Louie Kelcher (2nd team)
- Pro Bowlers: 2: DT Louie Kelcher; T Russ Washington

The 1977 San Diego Chargers season was the franchise's eighth season in the National Football League (NFL), and its 18th overall. It was Tommy Prothro's final full season as the team's head coach.

The 7–7 record allowed the Chargers to break a string of seven consecutive losing seasons. It was their best mark since the AFL–NFL merger.

== Offseason ==
=== NFL draft ===
1977 San Diego Chargers draft
Round	Pick	Player	Position	College	Notes
1	24	Bob Rush	Center	Memphis	
3	77	Linden King	Linebacker	Colorado State	
5	124	Clarence Williams	Running back	South Carolina	
5	128	Cliff Olander	Quarterback	New Mexico State	
6	146	Dave Lindstrom	Defensive end	Boston University	
6	151	Larry Barnes	Running back	Tennessee State	
6	152	Pete Shaw	Safety	Northwestern	
7	181	Ron Bush	Defensive back	Southern California	
9	234	Gene Washington	Wide receiver	Georgia	
10	265	Curtis Townsend	Linebacker	Arkansas	
12	319	Jim Stansik	Tight end	Eastern Michigan	
Made roster * Made at least one Pro Bowl during career

== Roster ==
1977 San Diego Chargers roster
Quarterbacks (QB): 14 Dan Fouts; 19 Bill Munson; 10 Cliff Olander; Running backs (RB): 38 Larry Barnes; 37 Hank Bauer; 41 Bo Matthews; 24 Joe Washington; 40 Clarence Williams; 33 Don Woods; 34 Rickey Young; Wide receivers (WR): 87 Larry Dorsey; 18 Charlie Joiner; 89 Dwight McDonald; 85 Artie Owens; 20 Johnny Rodgers; Tight ends (TE): 82 Pat Curran; 84 Bob Klein	Offensive linemen (OL): 64 Charles Aiu G; 65 Booker Brown T; 62 Don Macek G; 53 Ralph Perretta C; 56 Bob Rush C; 66 Billy Shields T; 70 Russ Washington T; 63 Doug Wilkerson G; Defensive linemen (DL): 71 Fred Dean DE; 73 Charles DeJurnett DT; 74 Louie Kelcher DT; 79 Gary Johnson DT; 68 Leroy Jones DE; 69 John Lee DE	Linebackers (LB): 50 Don Goode OLB; 58 Tom Graham MLB; 55 Bob Horn MLB; 51 Woodrow Lowe OLB; 57 Rick Middleton OLB; 52 Ray Preston OLB; Defensive backs (DB): 48 Jerome Dove CB; 21 Clarence Duren FS; 42 Mike Fuller SS; 44 Pete Shaw FS; 45 Hal Stringert CB; 29 Mike Williams CB; Special teams (ST): 6 Rolf Benirschke K; 80 Jeff West P	Reserve: 46 Danny Colbert CB (IR); 12 James Harris QB (IR); 31 Keith King S (IR); -- Dave Lindstrom DE (IR); -- Curtis Townsend LB (IR); Rookies in italics

== Preseason ==
1977 preseason games
Week	Date	Opponent	Result	Record	Venue	Attendance
1	August 6	at Dallas Cowboys	L 14–34	0–1	Texas Stadium	
2	August 13	San Francisco 49ers	W 32–13	1–1	San Diego Stadium	
3	August 20	New York Giants	W 29–17	2–1	San Diego Stadium	
4	August 27	at Oakland Raiders	L 7–35	2–2	Oakland–Alameda County Coliseum	
5	September 1	at Los Angeles Rams	W 26–25	3–2	Los Angeles Memorial Coliseum	
6	September 11	Seattle Seahawks	W 38–20	4–2	San Diego Stadium	

== Regular season ==
=== Schedule ===
Week	Date	Opponent	Result	Record	Venue	Attendance	Recap
1	September 18	at **Oakland Raiders**	**L** 0–24	0–1	Oakland–Alameda County Coliseum	51,022	Recap
2	September 25	at **Kansas City Chiefs**	**W** 23–7	1–1	Arrowhead Stadium	56,146	Recap
3	October 2	Cincinnati Bengals	**W** 24–3	2–1	San Diego Stadium	40,352	Recap
4	October 9	at New Orleans Saints	**W** 14–0	3–1	Louisiana Superdome	53,942	Recap
5	October 16	New England Patriots	**L** 20–24	3–2	San Diego Stadium	50,327	Recap
6	October 23	**Kansas City Chiefs**	**L** 16–21	3–3	San Diego Stadium	33,010	Recap
7	October 30	at Miami Dolphins	**W** 14–13	4–3	Miami Orange Bowl	40,670	Recap
8	November 6	at Detroit Lions	**L** 0–20	4–4	Pontiac Silverdome	72,559	Recap
9	November 13	**Denver Broncos**	**L** 14–17	4–5	San Diego Stadium	45,211	Recap
10	November 20	**Oakland Raiders**	**W** 12–7	5–5	San Diego Stadium	50,887	Recap
11	November 27	at **Seattle Seahawks**	**W** 30–28	6–5	Kingdome	58,994	Recap
12	December 4	Cleveland Browns	**W** 37–14	7–5	San Diego Stadium	37,312	Recap
13	December 11	at **Denver Broncos**	**L** 9–17	7–6	Mile High Stadium	74,905	Recap
14	December 18	Pittsburgh Steelers	**L** 9–10	7–7	San Diego Stadium	50,727	Recap
Note: Intra-division opponents are in **bold** text.

=== Game summaries ===
==== Week 1: at Oakland Raiders ====
Week One: San Diego Chargers at Oakland Raiders – Game summary

Quarter	1	2	3	4	Total
Chargers	0	0	0	0	**0**
**Raiders**	7	10	7	0	**24**

at Oakland-Alameda County Coliseum, Oakland, California

- Date: September 18
- Game time: 1:00 p.m. PDT
- Game weather: 66 °F (18.9 °C), relative humidity 71%, wind 11 miles per hour (18 km/h; 9.6 kn)
- Game attendance: 51,022
- Referee: Cal Lepore
- TV announcers (NBC): Jim Simpson and Merlin Olsen
- Box score

Game information

**First quarter**

- OAK – Cliff Branch 7-yard pass from Ken Stabler (Errol Mann kick), 4:54. Raiders 7–0. **Drive: 4 plays, 13 yards, 0:28.**

**Second quarter**

- OAK – Errol Mann 20-yard field goal, 9:29. Raiders 10–0. **Drive: 17 plays, 72 yards, 8:37.**
- OAK – Dave Casper 1-yard pass from Ken Stabler (Errol Mann kick), 0:28. Raiders 17–0. **Drive: 3 plays, 10 yards, 0:14.**

**Third quarter**

- OAK – Pete Banaszak 2-yard run (Errol Mann kick), 0:33. Raiders 24–0. **Drive: 5 plays, 54 yards, 1:51.**

**Fourth quarter**

- No scoring plays.

**Top passers**

- SDG – James Harris – 11/22, 77 yards, INT
- OAK – Ken Stabler – 13/20, 139 yards, 2 TD, INT

**Top rushers**

- SDG – Don Woods – 7 rushes, 30 yards
- OAK – Mark van Eeghen – 19 rushes, 62 yards

**Top receivers**

- SDG – Charlie Joiner – 4 receptions, 33 yards
- OAK – Cliff Branch – 4 receptions, 56 yards, TD

==== Week 2: at Kansas City Chiefs ====
Week Two: San Diego Chargers at Kansas City Chiefs – Game summary

Quarter	1	2	3	4	Total
**Chargers**	7	9	0	7	**23**
Chiefs	7	0	0	0	**7**

at Arrowhead Stadium, Kansas City, Missouri

- Date: September 25
- Game time: 1:00 p.m. CDT
- Game weather: 66 °F (18.9 °C), relative humidity 71%, wind 10 miles per hour (16 km/h; 8.7 kn)
- Game attendance: 56,146
- Referee: Red Cashion
- TV announcers (NBC): Stu Nahan and Floyd Little
- Box score

Game information

**First quarter**

- SDG – Don Woods 12-yard pass from James Harris (Rolf Benirschke kick), 9:59. Chargers 7–0. **Drive: 6 plays, 41 yards, 3:21.**
- KAN – Henry Marshall 19-yard pass from Mike Livingston (Jan Stenerud kick), 3:20. Tied 7–7. **Drive: 7 plays, 44 yards, 3:33.**

**Second quarter**

- SDG – Leroy Jones 17-yard interception return (kick failed), 13:33. Chargers 13–7.
- SDG – Rolf Benirschke 31-yard field goal, 0:24. Chargers 16–7. **Drive: 10 plays, 37 yards, 2:10.**

**Third quarter**

- No scoring plays.

**Fourth quarter**

- SDG – Mike Fuller 7-yard run (Rolf Benirschke kick), 2:01. Chargers 23–7. **Drive: 14 plays, 54 yards, 7:58.**

**Top passers**

- SDG – James Harris – 11/25, 85 yards, TD, 3 INT
- KAN – Mike Livingston – 7/21, 101 yards, TD, 3 INT

**Top rushers**

- SDG – Clarence Williams – 9 rushes, 88 yards
- KAN – Tony Reed – 13 rushes, 26 yards

**Top receivers**

- SDG – Joe Washington – 2 receptions, 18 yards
- KAN – Walter White – 5 receptions, 70 yards

==== Week 3: vs. Cincinnati Bengals ====
Week Three: Cincinnati Bengals at San Diego Chargers – Game summary

Quarter	1	2	3	4	Total
Bengals	0	3	0	0	**3**
**Chargers**	7	7	7	3	**24**

at San Diego Stadium, San Diego, California

- Date: October 2
- Game time: 1:00 p.m. PDT
- Game weather: 70 °F (21.1 °C), relative humidity 82%, wind 6 miles per hour (9.7 km/h; 5.2 kn)
- Game attendance: 40,352
- Referee: Don Wedge
- TV announcers (NBC): Jim Simpson and John Brodie
- Box score

Game information

**First quarter**

- SDG – Charlie Joiner 30-yard pass from James Harris (Rolf Benirschke kick), 9:59. Chargers 7–0. **Drive: 10 plays, 80 yards, 5:01.**

**Second quarter**

- CIN – Chris Bahr 35-yard field goal, 1:58. Chargers 7–3. **Drive: 5 plays, 14 yards, 1:12.**
- SDG – Charlie Joiner 15-yard pass from James Harris (Rolf Benirschke kick), 0:29. Chargers 14–3. **Drive: 4 plays, 68 yards, 1:29.**

**Third quarter**

- SDG – James Harris 1-yard run (Rolf Benirschke kick), 1:13. Chargers 21–3. **Drive: 17 plays, 83 yards, 9:08.**

**Fourth quarter**

- SDG – Rolf Benirschke 42-yard field goal, 8:54. Chargers 24–3. **Drive: 11 plays, 60 yards, 5:59.**

**Top passers**

- CIN – Ken Anderson – 14/31, 161 yards, 3 INT
- SDG – James Harris – 14/20, 200 yards, 2 TD, INT

**Top rushers**

- CIN – Archie Griffin – 9 rushes, 38 yards
- SDG – Rickey Young – 14 rushes, 62 yards

**Top receivers**

- CIN – Archie Griffin – 5 receptions, 59 yards
- SDG – Charlie Joiner – 4 receptions, 70 yards, 2 TD

==== Week 4: at New Orleans Saints ====
Week Four: San Diego Chargers at New Orleans Saints – Game summary

Quarter	1	2	3	4	Total
**Chargers**	7	0	0	7	**14**
Saints	0	0	0	0	**0**

at Louisiana Superdome, New Orleans, Louisiana

- Date: October 9
- Game time: 1:00 p.m. CDT
- Game weather: N/A (game played indoors)
- Game attendance: 53,942
- Referee: Pat Haggerty
- TV announcers (NBC): Stu Nahan and Len Dawson
- Box score

Game information

**First quarter**

- SDG – Mike Fuller 88-yard punt return (Rolf Benirschke kick), 11:19. Chargers 7–0.

**Second quarter**

- No scoring plays.

**Third quarter**

- No scoring plays.

**Fourth quarter**

- SDG – Rickey Young 5-yard run (Rolf Benirschke kick), 1:16. Chargers 14–0. **Drive: 8 plays, 60 yards, 4:28.**

**Top passers**

- SDG – James Harris – 11/21, 137 yards
- NO – Archie Manning – 16/26, 124 yards, INT

**Top rushers**

- SDG – Rickey Young – 11 rushes, 40 yards, TD
- NO – Chuck Muncie – 18 rushes, 78 yards

**Top receivers**

- SDG – Larry Dorsey – 3 receptions, 43 yards
- NO – Tony Galbreath – 9 receptions, 55 yards

==== Week 5: vs. New England Patriots ====
Week Five: New England Patriots at San Diego Chargers – Game summary

Quarter	1	2	3	4	Total
**Patriots**	7	0	7	10	**24**
Chargers	6	0	7	7	**20**

at San Diego Stadium, San Diego, California

- Date: October 16
- Game time: 1:00 p.m. PDT
- Game weather: 66 °F (18.9 °C), relative humidity 86%, wind 8 miles per hour (13 km/h; 7.0 kn)
- Game attendance: 50,327
- Referee: Jim Tunney
- TV announcers (NBC): Jay Randolph and Len Dawson
- Box score

Game information

**First quarter**

- NE – Don Hasselbeck 1-yard pass from Steve Grogan (John Smith kick), 7:14. Patriots 7–0. **Drive: 11 plays, 55 yards, 5:22.**
- SDG – Clarence Williams 1-yard run (kick failed), 5:59. Patriots 7–6. **Drive: 2 plays, 79 yards, 1:08.**

**Second quarter**

- No scoring plays.

**Third quarter**

- SDG – Rickey Young 1-yard run (Rolf Benirschke kick), 9:58. Chargers 13–7. **Drive: 5 plays, 48 yards, 0:54.**
- NE – Ike Forte 7-yard run (John Smith kick), 3:30. Patriots 14–13. **Drive: 12 plays, 64 yards, 6:28.**

**Fourth quarter**

- NE – John Smith 28-yard field goal, 9:23. Patriots 17–13. **Drive: 10 plays, 50 yards, 5:38.**
- NE – Don Hasselbeck 4-yard pass from Steve Grogan (John Smith kick), 3:09. Patriots 24–13. **Drive: 2 plays, 6 yards, 0:49.**
- SDG – Charlie Joiner 16-yard pass from Bill Munson (Rolf Benirschke kick), 1:45. Patriots 24–20. **Drive: 4 plays, 71 yards, 1:24.**

**Top passers**

- NE – Steve Grogan – 12/22, 83 yards, 2 TD, INT
- SDG – James Harris – 10/15, 152 yards, INT

**Top rushers**

- NE – Sam Cunningham – 12 rushes, 141 yards
- SDG – Don Woods – 7 rushes, 30 yards

**Top receivers**

- NE – Sam Cunningham – 5 receptions, 71 yards
- SDG – Don Woods – 8 receptions, 111 yards

==== Week 6: vs. Kansas City Chiefs ====
Week Six: Kansas City Chiefs at San Diego Chargers – Game summary

Quarter	1	2	3	4	Total
**Chiefs**	0	0	7	14	**21**
Chargers	3	7	3	3	**16**

at San Diego Stadium, San Diego, California

- Date: October 23
- Game time: 1:00 p.m. PDT
- Game weather: 69 °F (20.6 °C), relative humidity 82%, wind 7 miles per hour (11 km/h; 6.1 kn)
- Game attendance: 33,010
- Referee: Chuck Heberling
- TV announcers (NBC): Jay Randolph and Floyd Little
- Box score

Game information

**First quarter**

- SDG – Rolf Benirschke 40-yard field goal, 10:25. Chargers 3–0. **Drive: 11 plays, 58 yards, 4:35.**

**Second quarter**

- SDG – Larry Dorsey 26-yard pass from James Harris (Rolf Benirschke kick), 5:22. Chargers 10–0. **Drive: 4 plays, 41 yards, 1:58.**

**Third quarter**

- KAN – Walter White 5-yard pass from Tony Adams (Jan Stenerud kick), 9:09. Chargers 10–7. **Drive: 9 plays, 80 yards, 3:05.**
- SDG – Rolf Benirschke 47-yard field goal, 4:11. Chargers 13–7. **Drive: 10 plays, 44 yards, 4:58.**

**Fourth quarter**

- SDG – Rolf Benirschke 24-yard field goal, 9:14. Chargers 16–7. **Drive: 11 plays, 53 yards, 5:28.**
- KAN – Tony Reed 1-yard run (Jan Stenerud kick), 2:30. Chargers 16–14. **Drive: 2 plays, 1 yard, 0:27.**
- KAN – Tim Gray 15-yard fumble return (Jan Stenerud kick), 2:08. Chiefs 21–16.

**Top passers**

- KAN – Tony Adams – 15/26, 215 yards, TD
- SDG – James Harris – 18/35, 233 yards, TD, 2 INT

**Top rushers**

- KAN – Tony Reed – 22 rushes, 68 yards, TD
- SDG – Rickey Young – 13 rushes, 51 yards

**Top receivers**

- KAN – Walter White – 6 receptions, 96 yards, TD
- SDG – Rickey Young – 9 receptions, 97 yards

==== Week 7: at Miami Dolphins ====
Week Seven: San Diego Chargers at Miami Dolphins – Game summary

Quarter	1	2	3	4	Total
**Chargers**	0	7	0	7	**14**
Dolphins	6	0	0	7	**13**

at Orange Bowl, Miami, Florida

- Date: October 30
- Game time: 1:00 p.m. EST
- Game weather: 75 °F (23.9 °C), relative humidity 74%, wind 6 miles per hour (9.7 km/h; 5.2 kn)
- Game attendance: 40,670
- Referee: Bob Frederic
- TV announcers (NBC): Dick Stockton and Paul Maguire
- Box score

Game information

**First quarter**

- MIA – Garo Yepremian 52-yard field goal, 9:08. Dolphins 3–0. **Drive: 9 plays, 40 yards, 3:42.**
- MIA – Garo Yepremian 45-yard field goal, 3:00. Dolphins 6–0. **Drive: 6 plays, 33 yards, 3:28.**

**Second quarter**

- SDG – Bob Klein 2-yard pass from James Harris (Rolf Benirschke kick), 7:25. Chargers 7–6. **Drive: 12 plays, 43 yards, 6:47.**

**Third quarter**

- No scoring play.

**Fourth quarter**

- MIA – Norm Bulaich 3-yard run (Garo Yepremian kick), 9:43. Dolphins 13–7. **Drive: 11 plays, 69 yards, 6:02.**
- SDG – James Harris 5-yard run (Rolf Benirschke kick), 0:00. Chargers 14–13. **Drive: 10 plays, 28 yards, 1:48.**

**Top passers**

- SDG – James Harris – 15/31, 131 yards, TD, 3 INT
- MIA – Bob Griese – 9/16, 82 yards, 3 INT

**Top rushers**

- SDG – Rickey Young – 14 rushes, 32 yards
- MIA – Norm Bulaich – 12 rushes, 89 yards, TD

**Top receivers**

- SDG – Joe Washington – 4 receptions, 30 yards
- MIA – Nat Moore – 3 receptions, 36 yards

==== Week 8: at Detroit Lions ====
Week Eight: San Diego Chargers at Detroit Lions – Game summary

Quarter	1	2	3	4	Total
Chargers	0	0	0	0	**0**
**Lions**	0	0	7	13	**20**

at Pontiac Silverdome, Detroit, Michigan

- Date: November 6
- Game time: 4:00 p.m. EST
- Game weather: N/A (game played indoors)
- Game attendance: 72,559
- Referee: Jerry Markbreit
- TV announcers (NBC): Dick Stockton and Paul Maguire
- Box score

Game information

**First quarter**

- No scoring plays.

**Second quarter**

- No scoring plays.

**Third quarter**

- DET – Rick Kane 2-yard run (Steve Mike-Mayer kick), 5:08. Lions 7–0. **Drive: 13 plays, 59 yards, 7:10.**

**Fourth quarter**

- DET – Rick Kane 1-yard run (Steve Mike-Mayer kick), 9:56. Lions 14–0. **Drive: 9 plays, 70 yards, 4:09.**
- DET – Marv Hubbard 1-yard run (kick failed), 4:57. Lions 20–0. **Drive: 5 plays, 40 yards, 2:55.**

**Top passers**

- SDG – Bill Munson – 9/16, 90 yards
- DET – Greg Landry – 5/7, 67 yards

**Top rushers**

- SDG – Joe Washington – 9 rushes, 54 yards
- DET – Rick Kane – 24 rushes, 105 yards, 2 TD

**Top receivers**

- SDG – Rickey Young – 4 receptions, 48 yards
- DET – Horace King – 3 receptions, 49 yards

==== Week 9: vs. Denver Broncos ====
Week Nine: Denver Broncos at San Diego Chargers – Game summary

Quarter	1	2	3	4	Total
**Broncos**	3	0	7	7	**17**
Chargers	7	7	0	0	**14**

at San Diego Stadium, San Diego, California

- Date: November 13
- Game time: 1:00 p.m. PST
- Game weather: 64 °F (17.8 °C), relative humidity 73%, wind 7 miles per hour (11 km/h; 6.1 kn)
- Game attendance: 45,211
- Referee: Chuck Heberling
- TV announcers (NBC): Stu Nahan and Len Dawson
- Box score

Game information

**First quarter**

- SDG – Fred Dean 11-yard fumble return (Rolf Benirschke kick), 9:27. Chargers 7–0.
- DEN – Jim Turner 35-yard field goal, 4:54. Chargers 7–3. **Drive: 13 plays, 67 yards, 4:33.**

**Second quarter**

- SDG – Charlie Joiner 32-yard pass from Joe Washington (Rolf Benirschke kick), 10:12. Chargers 14–3. **Drive: 4 plays, 51 yards, 2:04.**

**Third quarter**

- DEN – Haven Moses 33-yard pass from Craig Morton (Jim Turner kick), 8:10. Chargers 14–10. **Drive: 9 plays, 66 yards, 4:11.**

**Fourth quarter**

- DEN – Haven Moses 8-yard pass from Craig Morton (Jim Turner kick), 1:36. Broncos 17–14. **Drive: 8 plays, 54 yards, 1:01.**

**Top passers**

- DEN – Craig Morton – 12/32, 149 yards, 2 TD, INT
- SDG – James Harris – 13/31, 166 yards

**Top rushers**

- DEN – Lonnie Perrin – 9 rushes, 33 yards
  DEN – Otis Armstrong – 6 rushes, 33 yards
- SDG – Johnny Rodgers – 1 rush, 33 yards

**Top receivers**

- DEN – Haven Moses – 3 receptions, 66 yards, 2 TD
- SDG – Charlie Joiner – 4 receptions, 79 yards, TD

==== Week 10: vs. Oakland Raiders ====
Week Ten: Oakland Raiders at San Diego Chargers – Game summary

Quarter	1	2	3	4	Total
Raiders	0	7	0	0	**7**
**Chargers**	0	6	3	3	**12**

at San Diego Stadium, San Diego, California

- Date: November 20
- Game time: 1:00 p.m. PST
- Game weather: 59 °F (15.0 °C), relative humidity 56%, wind 9 miles per hour (14 km/h; 7.8 kn)
- Game attendance: 50,887
- Referee: Jim Tunney
- TV announcers (NBC): Dick Stockton and Paul Maguire
- Box score

Game information

**First quarter** No scoring plays. **Second quarter**

- SDG – Rickey Young 4-yard run (kick blocked), 8:46. Chargers 6–0. **Drive: 8 plays, 44 yards, 4:31.**
- OAK – Mike Rae 7-yard run (Errol Mann kick), 3:04. Raiders 7–6. **Drive: 9 plays, 73 yards, 5:42.**

**Third quarter**

- SDG – Rolf Benirschke 22-yard field goal, 3:57. Chargers 9–7. **Drive: 13 plays, 83 yards, 5:58.**

**Fourth quarter**

- SDG – Rolf Benirschke 46-yard field goal, 3:15. Chargers 12–7. **Drive: 10 plays, 36 yards, 5:33.**

**Top passers**

- OAK – Ken Stabler – 4/10, 40 yards
- SDG – Cliff Olander – 5/13, 51 yards, 2 INT

**Top rushers**

- OAK – Clarence Davis – 12 rushes, 49 yards
- SDG – Rickey Young – 17 rushes, 83 yards, TD

**Top receivers**

- OAK – Fred Biletnikoff – 2 receptions, 29 yards
- SDG – Joe Washington – 2 receptions, 22 yards

==== Week 11: at Seattle Seahawks ====
Week Eleven: San Diego Chargers at Seattle Seahawks – Game summary

Quarter	1	2	3	4	Total
**Chargers**	10	3	3	14	**30**
Seahawks	0	14	7	7	**28**

at Kingdome, Seattle, Washington

- Date: November 27
- Game time: 1:00 p.m. PST
- Game weather: N/A (game played indoors)
- Game attendance: 58,994
- Referee: Gene Barth
- TV announcers (NBC): Dick Stockton and Len Dawson
- Box score

Game information

**First quarter**

- SDG – Rickey Young 1-yard run (Rolf Benirschke kick), 7:55. Chargers 7–0. **Drive: 6 plays, 26 yards, 2:38.**
- SDG – Rolf Benirschke 40-yard field goal, 2:21. Chargers 10–0. **Drive: 6 plays, 30 yards, 3:27.**

**Second quarter**

- SDG – Rolf Benirschke 26-yard field goal, 12:19. Chargers 13–0. **Drive: 7 plays, 53 yards, 2:30.**
- SEA – Don Testerman 5-yard pass from Jim Zorn (John Leypoldt kick), 6:41. Chargers 13–7. **Drive: 10 plays, 69 yards, 5:28.**
- SEA – Steve Largent 27-yard pass from Jim Zorn (John Leypoldt kick), 0:50. Seahawks 14–13. **Drive: 8 plays, 74 yards, 4:27.**

**Third quarter**

- SDG – Rolf Benirschke 39-yard field goal, 13:19. Chargers 16–14. **Drive: 4 plays, 80 yards, 1:35.**
- SEA – Steve Largent 10-yard pass from Jim Zorn (John Leypoldt kick), 7:48. Seahawks 21–16. **Drive: 11 plays, 53 yards, 5:23.**

**Fourth quarter**

- SDG – Charlie Joiner 17-yard pass from Dan Fouts (Rolf Benirschke kick), 13:50. Chargers 23–21. **Drive: 7 plays, 41 yards, 2:56.**
- SDG – Fred Dean 22-yard interception return (Rolf Benirschke kick), 12:15. Chargers 30–21.
- SEA – David Sims 16-yard pass from Jim Zorn (John Leypoldt kick), 7:00. Chargers 30–28. **Drive: 7 plays, 65 yards, 2:26.**

**Top passers**

- SDG – Dan Fouts – 19/26, 199 yards, TD, INT
- SEA – Jim Zorn – 16/26, 291 yards, 4 TD, 2 INT

**Top rushers**

- SDG – Rickey Young – 19 rushes, 80 yards, TD
- SEA – Sherman Smith – 14 rushes, 56 yards

**Top receivers**

- SDG – Charlie Joiner – 5 receptions, 72 yards, TD
- SEA – Steve Largent – 4 receptions, 116 yards, 2 TD

==== Week 12: vs. Cleveland Browns ====
Week Twelve: Cleveland Browns at San Diego Chargers – Game summary

Quarter	1	2	3	4	Total
Browns	0	0	0	14	**14**
**Chargers**	14	13	3	7	**37**

at San Diego Stadium, San Diego, California

- Date: December 4
- Game time: 1:00 p.m. PST
- Game weather: 59 °F (15.0 °C), relative humidity 82%, wind 6 miles per hour (9.7 km/h; 5.2 kn)
- Game attendance: 37,312
- Referee: Fred Wyant
- TV announcers (NBC): Jay Randolph and Mike Adamle
- Box score

Game information

**First quarter**

- SDG – Don Woods 29-yard run (Rolf Benirschke kick), 9:57. Chargers 7–0. **Drive: 5 plays, 72 yards, 5:03.**
- SDG – Hank Bauer 15-yard pass from Dan Fouts (Rolf Benirschke kick), 4:34. Chargers 14–0. **Drive: 7 plays, 61 yards, 2:51.**

**Second quarter**

- SDG – Rolf Benirschke 35-yard field goal, 11:55. Chargers 17–0. **Drive: 9 plays, 31 yards, 4:22.**
- SDG – Charlie Joiner 30-yard pass from Dan Fouts (Rolf Benirschke kick), 1:17. Chargers 24–0. **Drive: 8 plays, 72 yards, 4:57.**
- SDG – Rolf Benirschke 36-yard field goal, 0:00. Chargers 27–0. **Drive: 2 plays, 43 yards, 0:15.**

**Third quarter**

- SDG – Rolf Benirschke 24-yard field goal, 2:09. Chargers 30–0. **Drive: 14 plays, 61 yards, 7:15.**

**Fourth quarter**

- CLE – Reggie Rucker 16-yard pass from Dave Mays (Don Cockroft kick), 13:28. Chargers 30–7. **Drive: 9 plays, 68 yards, 3:33.**
- SDG – Larry Dorsey 67-yard pass from Dan Fouts (Rolf Benirschke kick), 12:33. Chargers 37–7. **Drive: 2 plays, 67 yards, 0:55.**
- CLE – Cleo Miller 6-yard run (Don Cockroft kick), 1:24. Chargers 37–14. **Drive: 8 plays, 85 yards, 1:18.**

**Top passers**

- CLE – Dave Mays – 19/30, 228 yards, TD, INT
- SDG – Dan Fouts – 14/20, 237 yards, 3 TD

**Top rushers**

- CLE – Greg Pruitt – 16 rushes, 67 yards
- SDG – Don Woods – 11 rushes, 62 yards, TD

**Top receivers**

- CLE – Greg Pruitt – 6 receptions, 98 yards
- SDG – Larry Dorsey – 4 receptions, 108 yards, TD

==== Week 13: at Denver Broncos ====
Week Thirteen: San Diego Chargers at Denver Broncos – Game summary

Quarter	1	2	3	4	Total
Chargers	3	3	3	0	**9**
**Broncos**	7	0	0	10	**17**

at Mile High Stadium, Denver, Colorado

- Date: December 11
- Game time: 2:00 p.m. MST
- Game weather: 44 °F (6.7 °C), relative humidity 27%, wind 10 miles per hour (16 km/h; 8.7 kn)
- Game attendance: 74,905
- Referee: Red Cashion
- TV announcers (NBC): Jack Buck and Mike Haffner
- Box score

Game information

**First quarter**

- DEN – Lonnie Perrin 41-yard pass from Craig Morton (Jim Turner kick), 11:31. Broncos 7–0. **Drive: 7 plays, 74 yards, 3:29.**
- SDG – Rolf Benirschke 46-yard field goal, 6:50. Broncos 7–3. **Drive: 10 plays, 49 yards, 4:41.**

**Second quarter**

- SDG – Rolf Benirschke 46-yard field goal, 0:18. Broncos 7–6. **Drive: 7 plays, 37 yards, 0:42.**

**Third quarter**

- SDG – Rolf Benirschke 46-yard field goal, 4:23. Chargers 9–7. **Drive: 9 plays, 58 yards, 4:58.**

**Fourth quarter**

- DEN – Jim Turner 36-yard field goal, 6:39. Broncos 10–9. **Drive: 12 plays, 58 yards, 5:18.**
- DEN – Rick Upchurch 19-yard run (Jim Turner kick), 1:54. Broncos 17–9. **Drive: 6 plays, 46 yards, 2:55.**

**Top passers**

- SDG – Dan Fouts – 24/41, 276 yards, 2 INT
- DEN – Craig Morton – 9/17, 133 yards, TD

**Top rushers**

- SDG – Rickey Young – 8 rushes, 30 yards
- DEN – Jon Keyworth – 12 rushes, 41 yards

**Top receivers**

- SDG – Charlie Joiner – 4 receptions, 67 yards
- DEN – Riley Odoms – 6 receptions, 69 yards

==== Week 14: vs. Pittsburgh Steelers ====
Week Fourteen: Pittsburgh Steeler at San Diego Chargers – Game summary

Quarter	1	2	3	4	Total
**Steelers**	0	0	10	0	**10**
Chargers	6	3	0	0	**9**

at San Diego Stadium, San Diego, California

- Date: December 18
- Game time: 1:00 p.m. PST
- Game weather: 63 °F (17.2 °C), relative humidity 81%, wind 12 miles per hour (19 km/h; 10 kn)
- Game attendance: 50,727
- Referee: Ben Dreith
- TV announcers (NBC): Charlie Jones and Andy Russell
- Box score

Game information

**First quarter**

- SDG – Clarence Williams 2-yard run (kick blocked), 7:42. Chargers 6–0. **Drive: 10 plays, 62 yards, 5:32.**

**Second quarter**

- SDG – Rolf Benirschke 38-yard field goal, 8:26. Chargers 9–0. **Drive: 6 plays, 27 yards.**

**Third quarter**

- PIT – Sidney Thornton 1-yard run (Roy Gerela kick), 6:07. Chargers 9–7. **Drive: 6 plays, 62 yards, 2:07.**
- PIT – Roy Gerela 27-yard field goal, 1:14. Steelers 10–9. **Drive: 7 plays, 25 yards, 3:27.**

**Fourth quarter**

- No scoring plays.

**Top passers**

- PIT – Terry Bradshaw – 8/17, 139 yards, INT
- SDG – Dan Fouts – 12/22, 157 yards, 3 INT

**Top rushers**

- PIT – Alvin Maxson – 16 rushes, 51 yards
- SDG – Don Woods – 13 rushes, 28 yards

**Top receivers**

- PIT – John Stallworth – 3 receptions, 72 yards
- SDG – Charlie Joiner – 3 receptions, 53 yards

=== Standings ===
AFC West
	W	L	T	PCT	DIV	CONF	PF	PA	STK
^{(1)} Denver Broncos	12	2	0	.857	6–1	11–1	274	148	L1
^{(4)} Oakland Raiders	11	3	0	.786	5–2	10–2	351	230	W2
San Diego Chargers	7	7	0	.500	3–4	6–6	222	205	L2
Seattle Seahawks	5	9	0	.357	1–3	4–9	282	373	W2
Kansas City Chiefs	2	12	0	.143	1–6	1–11	225	349	L6

== Awards ==
Two Chargers was named to the 1978 Pro Bowl, with Russ Washington and Louie Kelcher both reserves on the AFC squad; Kelcher was also selected in the AP All-Pro second team.
