= Tommy Prothro =

American football player and coach (1920–1995)

Biographical details
- Born: July 20, 1920; Memphis, Tennessee, U.S.
- Died: May 14, 1995 (aged 74); Memphis, Tennessee, U.S.

Playing career
- 1938–1941: Duke
- Position: Quarterback

Coaching career (HC unless noted)
- 1942: Western Kentucky (assistant)
- 1946–1948: Vanderbilt (assistant)
- 1949–1954: UCLA (assistant)
- 1955–1964: Oregon State
- 1965–1970: UCLA
- 1971–1972: Los Angeles Rams
- 1974–1978: San Diego Chargers

Administrative career (AD unless noted)
- 1979–1981: Cleveland Browns (dir. pro personnel)

Head coaching record
- Overall: 104–55–5 (college); 35–51–2 (NFL)
- Bowls: 2–2

Accomplishments and honors

Championships
- 2 PCC (1956–1957); 2 AAWU (1964–1965)
- College Football Hall of Fame; Inducted in 1991 (profile)

James Thompson Prothro Jr. (July 20, 1920 – May 14, 1995) was an American football coach and player. He was the head coach at Oregon State University from 1955 to 1964 and the University of California, Los Angeles (UCLA) from 1965 to 1970, compiling a career college football record of 104–55–5 (.649).

Prothro moved to the professional ranks of the National Football League (NFL) in 1971 as head coach of the Los Angeles Rams, a position he held for two seasons. He then coached the San Diego Chargers from 1974 to 1978, tallying a career NFL mark of 35–51–2 (.409). Prothro was inducted into the College Football Hall of Fame as a coach in 1991.

== Early life and playing career ==
Prothro, a native of Memphis, Tennessee, was the son of Major League Baseball player and manager Doc Prothro, who played for three teams between 1920 and 1926, then managed the Philadelphia Phillies from 1939 to 1941 before buying the minor league Memphis Chicks. His uncle, Clifton B. Cates, was commandant of the United States Marine Corps from 1948 to 1952.

The younger Prothro found his niche in football, starting out as a quarterback for Wallace Wade's Duke Blue Devils. In 1941, Prothro's versatility on the field helped him win the Jacobs award as the best blocker in the Southern Conference as the Blue Devils reached the 1942 Rose Bowl. During his time at the school, Prothro also competed in baseball and lacrosse, and graduated from the school in 1942 with a degree in political science.

Prothro was selected in the seventh round of the 1942 NFL draft by the New York Giants, but rejected the opportunity in favor of a budding coaching career and a brief attempt at professional baseball.

== Assistant coaching career and military service ==
Prothro spent that fall as an assistant coach at Western Kentucky University. He then entered the U.S. Navy during World War II, serving for 39 months. Prothro was promoted to lieutenant and served as a gunnery officer aboard the USS Breton (CVE-23), an escort aircraft carrier.

After the war, Prothro served from 1946 to 1948 as an assistant coach at Vanderbilt University, under head coach Red Sanders, coaching the freshmen during his first year. When Sanders became head coach at UCLA, he brought Prothro with him. Over the next six years, Prothro used the single-wing formation as UCLA's backfield coach, helping the Bruins to an undefeated season and national championship in 1954.

== College head coaching career ==
=== Oregon State ===
That success translated into his hiring as head coach at Oregon State College on February 1, 1955. The Beavers had won just one of nine games the previous season, but improved to six wins in Prothro's first season, then reached the 1957 Rose Bowl. In 1962, the Beavers won a 6–0 decision over Villanova University in the Liberty Bowl; they were led by quarterback Terry Baker, who won the Heisman Trophy. Baker's 99-yard run from scrimmage was the only score in the game and remains an NCAA record. In 1964, Oregon State were admitted into the AAWU and tied for first place with USC. Due to their recent entry into that conference with schedules set years in advance, the Beavers and Trojans did not meet in 1964. Although Oregon State was assured of a better overall record (8–2) than USC (6–3), the AAWU announced it would delay its decision regarding the Rose Bowl berth until after USC's final game vs. undefeated and top-ranked Notre Dame. This made USC fans infer that, if the Trojans had a strong showing against heavily favored Notre Dame, they might somehow get the Rose Bowl berth despite Oregon State's better record. USC upset Notre Dame, 20–17, and USC fans were outraged when Oregon State was awarded the Rose Bowl anyway. This would be a factor two years later. In the 1965 Rose Bowl, the Beavers went ahead 7–0 in the second quarter, but went on lose big to Michigan 34–7. Ten days later, Prothro left Oregon State to replace Bill Barnes at UCLA. Prothro compiled a 63–37–2 mark in his decade at Oregon State, with only one losing season. He was replaced by Dee Andros, the head coach at Idaho, whose Vandals had played Oregon State tough in 1964 in Corvallis, defeated 10–7 by a late third quarter OSU punt return. The previous year, he led Idaho to its first winning season in a quarter century.

=== UCLA ===
==== 1965 ====
On January 11, 1965, he was hired as head coach at UCLA to replace William F. Barnes. In the 1965 football season, the Bruins lost their season opening game 13–3 at Michigan State, who then rose to become the top-ranked team in the country. The unheralded Bruins would go on a seven-game undefeated streak, surprising national powers like Syracuse and Penn State. Going into the 1965 UCLA–USC rivalry football game ranked #7, the conference championship and 1966 Rose Bowl were on the line. #6 USC, led by Heisman Trophy winner Mike Garrett led 16–6 until UCLA got a touchdown on a pass from Gary Beban to Dick Witcher with four minutes to play. After the two-point conversion made it 16–14, UCLA recovered an onside kick. Beban then hit Kurt Altenberg on a 50-yard bomb and UCLA won, 20–16. Integrated UCLA then faced all-white Tennessee in the newly built Liberty Bowl stadium in Memphis, Prothro's native city. On the last play of the game, Tennessee defensive back Bob Petrella intercepted a UCLA pass to save a Volunteer win by a score of 37–34. Tennessee's winning drive was aided by a controversial pass interference call, the clock had questionably stopped twice, and a dropped pass that appeared to be a lateral was recovered by UCLA but was later ruled an incomplete forward pass. After the game, Prothro stated, "For the first time in my life, I am ashamed to be a Southerner."

The Bruins went to the 1966 Rose Bowl as a 14½ point underdog in a rematch with undefeated and #1 ranked powerhouse Michigan State. UCLA, now dubbed "The Miracle Bruins" by Sports Illustrated, vanquished the heavily favored Spartans 14–12. That victory gave UCLA an 8–2–1 mark, prevented the Spartans from winning the AP title, and resulted in Prothro earning Coach of the Year accolades from his coaching colleagues. UCLA finished #4 that season, and due to their small size, earned the enduring moniker, "Gutty little Bruins."

==== 1966 ====
Heading into the final game of the 1966 season vs. USC, UCLA was 2–1 in conference games, 8–1 overall and ranked #5 in the country. The Bruins, featuring a "dream backfield" of All-Americans Gary Beban and Mel Farr, lost only one game, at rainy Washington, 16–3, where Huskies' head coach Jim Owens had devoted his entire season to beating Prothro. UCLA had beaten UW the season before, 28–24, with Prothro's trick play, the Z-streak in which a receiver trots towards the sideline like he's going out of the game and then runs a streak pattern unguarded by the inattentive defender. USC was 4–0 in conference and 7–1 overall, having lost to the unranked Miami Hurricanes. The Bruins and Trojans played a different number of conference games due to uneven scheduling caused by new AAWU members Oregon and Oregon State and schedules made years in advance. It was widely assumed that only losses would be considered and the winner of the 1966 UCLA-USC game would go to the 1967 Rose Bowl. UCLA star quarterback Gary Beban broke his ankle the week before in a win over Stanford, but backup Norman Dow, making his first and only start at quarterback, led UCLA to a 14–7 win. That left USC with a 4–1 conference record (7–2 overall) and #5 UCLA with a 3–1 conference record (9–1) overall. Due to their win over USC, it was widely assumed UCLA would get the Rose Bowl berth. However, a vote the next Monday among the AAWU conference athletic directors awarded USC the Rose Bowl berth. It was speculated that the directors believed Beban could not play for UCLA in the Rose Bowl due to the broken ankle, thereby giving the Big Ten Conference representative, Purdue, a better chance to win. As it turned out, Beban could have played. But a bigger reason was that this was to make up for 1964 when Oregon State was voted in ahead of USC. The coach of Oregon State in 1964 was Prothro. Another speculation was the vote was against UCLA out of pure jealousy by the rest of the conference, which voted 7–1 for the clearly inferior team. This vote deprived Prothro of being the first coach to earn three consecutive Rose Bowl berths and UCLA athletic director J. D. Morgan called it a "gross injustice" and the "a dark day in UCLA and AAWU Athletic history." Inflamed UCLA students who had gathered for the Rose Bowl celebration rally, took to the streets of Westwood in protest and actually blocked the 405 Freeway for a short time. Ironically, Morgan was the force behind establishing a tie-breaking method adopted by the conference one year later in which only loss column counted; the first tiebreaker was head-to-head results, followed by overall record. If there was still a tie, the Rose Bowl berth would go to the team that had not played in the Rose Bowl the longest. But it was too late for UCLA. In their final game, USC made the AAWU decision look bad by losing at home in the L.A. Coliseum to Notre Dame, 51–0. They went on to lose the Rose Bowl as well to Purdue, 14–13, finishing the season at 7–4.

==== 1967 ====
Two years later, Prothro helped a second quarterback capture the Heisman Trophy when Gary Beban was awarded the trophy after the regular season. He would bring his #1 ranked UCLA Bruin team to face #2 USC in one of the "Games of the Century". Despite playing with cracked ribs, Beban threw for 301 yards, but UCLA lost, 21–20, on a spectacular 64-yard run by O. J. Simpson in the 1967 USC vs. UCLA football game. Another big factor was UCLA's acclaimed sophomore kicker Zenon Andrusyshyn missing a chip shot field goal, and having two field goals and an extra point attempt blocked.

==== 1968 ====
In what was acknowledged to be a rebuilding year, the Bruins opened the 1968 season with a 63–7 defeat of Pittsburgh and a win over Washington State. The season ground to a halt at Syracuse and with the season-ending injury of quarterback Billy Bolden, and UCLA would win only one more game, over Stanford 20–17. The Bruins gave #1 USC and Heisman Trophy winner O. J. Simpson a scare in a 28–16 loss; UCLA trailed 21–16 late in the fourth quarter and had the ball inside USC's 10-yard line, but USC recovered a fumble and then used almost all of the remaining time in driving for their insurance touchdown.

==== 1969 ====
This was the year Prothro had geared his recruiting efforts towards as he believed this was his best team and was capable of contending for the national championship. The Bruins, quarterbacked by a sensational junior college transfer Dennis Dummit who was discovered by Prothro, were undefeated until they faced #10 Stanford on the road. Once again, Prothro was let down by now-senior kicker Zenon Andrusyshyn as he missed a short field goal late in the game with the score tied 20–20. Suddenly, two long Jim Plunkett passes had Stanford in field goal range in the final seconds, but UCLA blocked Steve Horowitz's field goal attempt, and preserved the tie.

Once again, the UCLA-USC game would decide the Pac-8 title and the 1970 Rose Bowl berth. UCLA was ranked 6th with a 5–0–1 record in conference and 8–0–1 overall USC was #5 and was 6–0 in conference and 8–0–1 overall (tied Notre Dame in South Bend, 14–14); UCLA and USC were both unbeaten coming into their rivalry game for the first time since 1952. UCLA scored midway through the fourth quarter to take a 12–7 lead (knowing he need a win and not a tie to advance to the Rose Bowl, Prothro had the Bruins go for two after each touchdown and each attempt failed). USC then drove to the winning touchdown with 1:38 to play to win 14–12. The Trojans were aided by two controversial calls; the first was a dubious pass interference call on UCLA's Danny Graham on a 4th-and-10 incompletion. Secondly, on the winning touchdown pass reception, USC receiver Sam Dickerson appeared to be either out of bounds, out of the back of the end zone, or both. This loss supposedly was harder for Prothro to take than the 1967 loss and the freak officiating calls resembled the debacle at Tennessee in 1965.

==== 1970 ====
In his final season at UCLA, Prothro's team suffered a rash of key injuries and finished 6–5, yet they were three close games from a 9–2 season and Rose Bowl berth. Before those injuries set in, UCLA took a 3–0 record into Austin to play defending national champ and top ranked Texas. Trailing 13–3 at the half, UCLA rallied and had a 17–13 lead in the final minute. But with 12 seconds left, Texas completed a long pass when their receiver caught the ball between two UCLA defenders, who then collided, allowing the receiver to score. UCLA also blew a 20-point fourth quarter lead against Oregon, when Ducks sophomore quarterback Dan Fouts rallied his team to three touchdowns and a 41–40 win. Finally, there came the showdown with Stanford; the game was expected to be a shootout between UCLA quarterback Dennis Dummit and Heisman winner Jim Plunkett. But the defenses ruled as UCLA took a 7–6 lead into the 4th quarter. Stanford took a 9–7 lead on a field goal, but UCLA was driving to a potential game-winning field goal or touchdown themselves when they completed a pass inside the Stanford 10-yard-line, only to have the receiver get sandwiched by two defenders on the tackle and fumble. This game ultimately decided the Pac-8 championship and 1971 Rose Bowl representative. The season ended on a high note however, when UCLA beat rival USC, 45–20, in a game that was not that close. This would end up being Prothro's final game at UCLA. Prothro was frustrated by bizarre officiating at critical moments, numerous last minute narrow losses, and losing out of the Rose Bowl by the conference vote in 1966. Prothro also decried the Pac-8 rule that only allowed the conference champion to go to a bowl game; he witnessed many lower ranked inferior teams (often ones he defeated during the season) go to bowl games while his Bruins stayed home. After George Allen was fired by the Los Angeles Rams, Prothro accepted that job.

=== The briefcase ===
One of Prothro's unusual characteristics was the fact he carried a briefcase to the sidelines in each game he coached at Oregon State and UCLA. Dressed in a suit and tie, fedora, and thick black framed glasses, he looked more like he was going to a business meeting than to coach a football game. The mystery was nobody knew what, if anything, was in the briefcase. Prothro was never seen opening it during games, and even his players weren't sure what was in it. Some speculated game plans, some thought scouting reports, and some thought it was empty. Los Angeles Times sports columnist Jim Murray once suggested in jest that all the briefcase contained was "a couple of peanut-butter sandwiches."

== NFL head coaching career ==
=== Los Angeles Rams ===
On January 2, 1971, Prothro accepted a new challenge when he was hired as head coach of the Los Angeles Rams. In his first season, playing the league's toughest schedule, he guided an aging Rams team to an 8–5–1 record, missing the playoffs when the San Francisco 49ers came from behind to beat the Detroit Lions, 31–27, in the season's final game and win the NFC West by one half game. In his second year, the Rams showed their age when injuries hit the team in the second half of the season. After starting 5–2–1, the Rams lost five of their last six games to finish 6–7–1, good for third place in the NFC West. After two seasons in which he compiled a 14–12–2 record and failed to reach the playoffs, Prothro was dismissed on January 24, 1973, in favor of Chuck Knox. However, Prothro left his mark on the team by trading many aging veterans, often to George Allen's Washington Redskins, and stocking up young talent and draft picks; players such as Lawrence McCutcheon, Isiah Robertson, Dave Elmendorf, Larry Brooks, Jim Bertelsen, Jack "Hacksaw" Reynolds, and Hall of Famer Jack Youngblood were the core of the Rams teams of the 1970s that won seven straight NFC Western division titles.

Six weeks after his departure, Prothro filed a $1.9 million lawsuit against the Rams, alleging new Rams owner Carroll Rosenbloom breached his contract by dismissing him "without cause". However, on May 23, 1973, the two sides settled out of court, with Prothro being paid $225,000 to cover the final three years of his contract. For the next eight months, Prothro remained out of the game, actively pursuing investment strategies, as well as his main hobby, competitive bridge.

=== San Diego Chargers ===
The San Diego Chargers hired Prothro as their new head coach on January 8, 1974, placing him in charge of rebuilding the once-proud franchise that had become mired in mediocrity and a drug scandal. During his first two years, the team continued to struggle, going 5–9 in 1974, and bottoming out with a 2–12 mark in 1975. From 1974 to 1977, though, Prothro drafted a number of players who would have a major impact on the franchise in years to come. Some of these players included wide receiver John Jefferson, centers Bob Rush and Don Macek, linebackers Woodrow Lowe and Don Goode, defensive linemen Gary "Big Hands" Johnson, Louie Kelcher and Fred Dean. He was also instrumental in the development of Dan Fouts into a Hall of Fame quarterback.

These drafts paid immediate dividends as the Chargers improved to 6–8 in 1976, and 7–7 in 1977, including a 12–7 win over rival Oakland that cost the Raiders the division title. The team seemed ready to make their move during the 1978 NFL season. However, a 1–3 start, marked by a loss to the Raiders in what became known as the Holy Roller game of September 10, caused Prothro to abruptly resign as head coach, replaced by Don Coryell. The Chargers finished 1978 with a 9–7 record, their first winning season since 1969, as the team Prothro helped build won three straight AFC Western Division titles and made the playoffs every year from 1979 to 1982.

=== Cleveland Browns ===
After less than five months away from the game, Prothro once again returned on February 14, 1979, this time as Player Personnel Director of the Cleveland Browns. During his three years with the team, he was responsible for drafting future Pro Bowl players Cody Risien and Hanford Dixon, among others. The Browns improved from an 8–8 record in 1978 to 9–7 in 1979, and then supplanted the two time defending Super Bowl champion Pittsburgh Steelers as AFC Central Division champs in 1980 with an 11–5 record. Known as the "Kardiac Kids," the team, in both 1979 and 1980, won several games near the end of regulation or in overtime. Only an ill-advised interception in the end zone (when the Browns were in easy field goal range) in a 14–12 playoff loss to the Oakland Raiders cost Cleveland a shot at Prothro's former team, the Chargers, in the AFC title game. He resigned his post with Cleveland after the 1981 season.

== Retirement ==
Prothro would not return to football in any official capacity for the remainder of his life, but was honored for his career efforts by selection to the UCLA Athletics Hall of Fame in 1985, the Oregon Sports Hall of Fame in 1989, and the College Football Hall of Fame in 1991. An expert bridge player, for a number of years he partnered with Omar Sharif in international competition. A heavy smoker (up to 4 packs a day), he died in 1995 after a three-year battle with cancer.

=== Legacy ===
Prothro was known as an effective tactician with an ability to get the most out his players and team. His teams were often not as physically gifted or they were much smaller than their opponents, but through teamwork, game plans, and an assortment of trick plays, they often won in spite of physical disadvantages. Even in the pros, he had an aging Rams team in playoff contention until the final game of the season. As a disciple of the single wing formation under Red Sanders, Prothro preferred athletic quarterbacks who could run and pass (Terry Baker, Gary Beban), bringing some of that philosophy to the pros and having Rams QB Roman Gabriel make some big plays on designed runs. He later made his mark as an evaluator and developer of talent as he built the Chargers and Browns from being sub-.500 teams to division champions.

On August 22, 2016, The Tournament of Roses announced Bobby Bell, Ricky Ervins, Tommy Prothro, and Art Spander would be inducted into the Rose Bowl Hall of Fame in the Class of 2016. The Rose Bowl Hall of Fame Induction Ceremony then took place on January 1, 2017, outside the Rose Bowl Stadium, one day before the kickoff of the 103rd Rose Bowl Game on Monday January 2, 2017.

== Head coaching record ==
=== College ===
Year	Team	Overall	Conference	Standing	Bowl/playoffs	Coaches^{#}	AP^{°}
Oregon State Beavers (Pacific Coast Conference) (1955–1958)
1955	Oregon State	6–3	5–2	2nd			
1956	Oregon State	7–3–1	6–1–1	1st	L Rose	13	10
1957	Oregon State	8–2	6–2	T–1st			
1958	Oregon State	6–4	5–3	4th			
Oregon State Beavers (NCAA University Division independent) (1959–1963)
1959	Oregon State	3–7					
1960	Oregon State	6–3–1					
1961	Oregon State	5–5					
1962	Oregon State	9–2			W Liberty	16	
1963	Oregon State	5–5					
Oregon State Beavers (Athletic Association of Western Universities) (1964)
1964	Oregon State	8–3	3–1	T–1st	L Rose	8	8
Oregon State:		63–37–2	25–9–1				
UCLA Bruins (AAWU / Pacific-8 Conference) (1965–1970)
1965	UCLA	8–2–1	4–0	1st	W Rose	5	4
1966	UCLA	9–1	3–1	T–2nd		5	5
1967	UCLA	7–2–1	4–1–1	T–2nd		10	
1968	UCLA	3–7	2–4	T–5th			
1969	UCLA	8–1–1	5–1–1	T–2nd		10	13
1970	UCLA	6–5	4–3	T–2nd			
UCLA:		41–18–3	22–10–2				
Total:		104–55–5					
National championship Conference title Conference division title or championship game berth
^{#}Rankings from final Coaches Poll.; ^{°}Rankings from final AP Poll.

=== Professional ===
Team	Year	Regular season					Postseason			
Team	Year	Won	Lost	Ties	Win %	Finish	Won	Lost	Win %	Result
LA	1971	8	5	1	.607	2nd in NFC West	–	–	–	–
LA	1972	6	7	1	.464	3rd in NFC West	–	–	–	–
LA total		14	12	2	.536		–	–	–	–
SD	1974	5	9	0	.357	3rd in AFC West	–	–	–	–
SD	1975	2	12	0	.143	4th in AFC West	–	–	–	–
SD	1976	6	8	0	.429	3rd in AFC West	–	–	–	–
SD	1977	7	7	0	.500	3rd in AFC West	–	–	–	–
SD	1978	1	3	0	.250	3rd in AFC West	–	–	–	–
SD total		21	39	0	.350		–	–	–	–
NFL total		35	51	2	.409		–	–	–	–
Total		35	51	2	.409		–	–	–	–
