= Rickey Young =

American football player (born 1953)

No. 34
- Position: Running back

Personal information
- Born: December 7, 1953 (age 72); Mobile, Alabama, U.S.
- Listed height: 6 ft 2 in (1.88 m)
- Listed weight: 196 lb (89 kg)

Career information
- High school: Vigor (Prichard, Alabama)
- College: Jackson State
- NFL draft: 1975: 7th round, 164th overall pick

Career history
- San Diego Chargers (1975–1977); Minnesota Vikings (1978–1983)

Awards and highlights
- NFL receptions leader (1978)

Career NFL statistics
- Rushing attempts: 1,011
- Rushing yards: 3,666
- Rushing touchdowns: 23
- Receptions: 408
- Receiving yards: 3,285
- Receiving touchdowns: 16
- Stats at Pro Football Reference

Rickey Darnell Young (born December 7, 1953) is an American former professional football player who was a running back for nine seasons in the National Football League (NFL). He played college football for the Jackson State Tigers.

== College career ==
Young played college football at Jackson State University and was a teammate of Walter Payton, his nephew, and Robert Brazile, his cousin.

== Professional career ==
Young was selected in the seventh round of the 1975 NFL draft with the 164th overall pick by the San Diego Chargers. After playing three years for the Chargers (1975–1977) he was traded to the Minnesota Vikings for All-Pro guard Ed White. In his first season with the Vikings (1978) he led the NFL with 88 receptions, breaking Chuck Foreman's record for receptions by a running back in a season. He played in six seasons with the Vikings, but retired after seeing limited action in 1982 and 1983. He retired with 1,011 rushes for 3,666 yards and 23 touchdowns, along with 408 catches (then an NFL record for running backs) for 3,285 and 16 touchdowns.

In his nine seasons in the NFL, Young did not miss a single game, playing in all 131 contests that his teams played in that span. In the 1984 season, the Miami Dolphins reached out to Young about playing for the team after the injury to Andra Franklin. However, Young failed the drug test and was ultimately not signed.

== NFL career statistics ==
Legend
| | Led the league |
| **Bold** | Career high |

=== Regular season ===
| Year | Team | Games | | Rushing | | | | | Receiving | | | | |
| Year | Team | GP | GS | Att | Yds | Avg | Lng | TD | Rec | Yds | Avg | Lng | TD |
|---|---|---|---|---|---|---|---|---|---|---|---|---|---|
| 1975 | SDG | 14 | 8 | 138 | 577 | 4.2 | **48** | **5** | 21 | 166 | 7.9 | 16 | 1 |
| 1976 | SDG | 14 | 14 | 162 | **802** | **5.0** | 46 | 4 | 47 | 441 | 9.4 | 33 | 1 |
| 1977 | SDG | 14 | 14 | 157 | 543 | 3.5 | 15 | 4 | 48 | 423 | 8.8 | 28 | 0 |
| 1978 | MIN | **16** | **16** | 134 | 417 | 3.1 | 16 | 1 | **88** | **704** | 8.0 | **48** | **5** |
| 1979 | MIN | **16** | **16** | **188** | 708 | 3.8 | 26 | 3 | 72 | 519 | 7.2 | 18 | 4 |
| 1980 | MIN | **16** | **16** | 130 | 351 | 2.7 | 14 | 3 | 64 | 499 | 7.8 | 22 | 2 |
| 1981 | MIN | **16** | 13 | 47 | 129 | 2.7 | 13 | 0 | 43 | 296 | 6.9 | 22 | 2 |
| 1982 | MIN | 9 | 1 | 16 | 49 | 3.1 | 11 | 1 | 4 | 44 | **11.0** | 25 | 1 |
| 1983 | MIN | **16** | 4 | 39 | 90 | 2.3 | 9 | 2 | 21 | 193 | 9.2 | **48** | 0 |
| | | 131 | 102 | 1,011 | 3,666 | 3.6 | 48 | 23 | 408 | 3,285 | 8.1 | 48 | 16 |

=== Playoffs ===
| Year | Team | Games | | Rushing | | | | | Receiving | | | | |
| Year | Team | GP | GS | Att | Yds | Avg | Lng | TD | Rec | Yds | Avg | Lng | TD |
|---|---|---|---|---|---|---|---|---|---|---|---|---|---|
| 1978 | MIN | 1 | **1** | 0 | 0 | 0.0 | 0 | 0 | 4 | 49 | **12.3** | **24** | 0 |
| 1980 | MIN | 1 | **1** | **2** | 0 | 0.0 | 0 | 0 | **6** | **57** | 9.5 | 23 | 0 |
| 1982 | MIN | **2** | 0 | 1 | **6** | **6.0** | **6** | 0 | 2 | 13 | 6.5 | 8 | 0 |
| | | 4 | 2 | 3 | 6 | 2.0 | 6 | 0 | 12 | 119 | 9.9 | 24 | 0 |
