= Jeff West (American football) =

American football player (born 1953)

No. 80, 8
- Positions: Punter, tight end

Personal information
- Born: April 6, 1953 (age 73); Ravenna, Ohio, U.S.
- Listed height: 6 ft 3 in (1.91 m)
- Listed weight: 212 lb (96 kg)

Career information
- High school: Ravenna
- College: Cincinnati
- NFL draft: 1975: 5th round, 122nd overall pick

Career history
- Cincinnati Bengals (1975)*; St. Louis Cardinals (1975); San Diego Chargers (1976–1979); Seattle Seahawks (1981–1985)
- * Offseason or practice squad member only

Career NFL statistics
- Punts: 621
- Punt yards: 23,641
- Longest punt: 62
- Stats at Pro Football Reference

Jeffrey Harold West (born April 6, 1953) is an American former professional football player who was a punter and tight end from 1975 to 1985 for the St. Louis Cardinals, San Diego Chargers, and Seattle Seahawks of the National Football League (NFL). He played college football for the Cincinnati Bearcats. Over 10 NFL seasons, he punted 621 times for 23,641 yards and a 38.1 average. He appeared in 7 playoff games punting 37 times for a 37.7 average. He currently ranks fifth in Seahawks franchise history for punting yardage.

== NFL career statistics ==
Legend
	Led the league
**Bold**	Career high

=== Regular season ===
Year	Team	Punting									
Year	Team	GP	Punts	Yds	Net Yds	Lng	Avg	Net Avg	Blk	Ins20	TB
1975	STL	14	64	2,412	1,963	58	37.7	30.2	1	-	6
1976	SDG	6	38	1,548	1,225	57	**40.7**	32.2	0	9	5
1977	SDG	13	72	2,707	2,269	59	37.6	31.1	1	10	3
1978	SDG	**16**	73	2,720	2,204	59	37.3	29.4	**2**	22	8
1979	SDG	**16**	75	2,736	2,352	**62**	36.5	31.4	0	23	9
1981	SEA	15	66	2,578	2,385	56	39.1	**36.1**	0	16	2
1982	SEA	9	48	1,835	1,706	52	38.2	35.5	0	8	3
1983	SEA	**16**	79	3,118	2,733	56	39.5	34.6	0	**25**	**10**
1984	SEA	**16**	**95**	**3,567**	**3,162**	60	37.5	33.3	0	24	**10**
1985	SEA	2	11	420	311	52	38.2	28.3	0	0	3
Career		123	621	23,641	20,310	62	38.1	32.5	4	137	59

=== Playoffs ===
Year	Team	Punting									
Year	Team	GP	Punts	Yds	Net Yds	Lng	Avg	Net Avg	Blk	Ins20	TB
1975	STL	1	6	256	-	53	**42.7**	-	0	-	0
1979	SDG	1	2	64	39	35	32.0	19.5	0	0	0
1983	SEA	**3**	12	437	394	47	36.4	32.8	0	2	0
1984	SEA	2	**15**	**561**	**526**	**58**	37.4	**35.1**	0	**6**	0
Career		7	35	1,318	959	58	37.7	27.4	0	8	0
