= Ron Singleton =

American football player (born 1952)

No. 72, 67
- Position: Offensive tackle

Personal information
- Born: April 15, 1952 (age 74); New Orleans, Louisiana, U.S.
- Listed height: 6 ft 7 in (2.01 m)
- Listed weight: 260 lb (118 kg)

Career information
- High school: West Jefferson (Harvey, Louisiana)
- College: Grambling State
- NFL draft: 1976: 4th round, 113th overall pick

Career history
- San Diego Chargers (1976); San Francisco 49ers (1977–1980)

Career NFL statistics
- Games played: 59
- Games started: 39
- Fumble recoveries: 1
- Stats at Pro Football Reference

Ronald Lee Singleton (born April 15, 1952) is an American former professional football player who was an offensive tackle in the National Football League (NFL). He was selected 113th overall by the San Diego Chargers in the fourth round of the 1976 NFL draft. He played college football for the Grambling State Tigers. He is mentioned in The Blind Side, by Michael Lewis.
