= Charles Aiu =

American football player (1954–2001)

No. 64
- Position: Guard

Personal information
- Born: May 22, 1954; Honolulu, Hawaii, U.S.
- Died: December 28, 2001 (aged 47)
- Listed height: 6 ft 2 in (1.88 m)
- Listed weight: 251 lb (114 kg)

Career information
- College: Hawaii
- NFL draft: 1976: undrafted

Career history
- San Diego Chargers (1976–1978); Seattle Seahawks (1978)

Career NFL statistics
- Games played: 33
- Games started: 1
- Stats at Pro Football Reference

Charles Kahoalii Aiu III (May 22, 1954—December 28, 2001) was an American professional football guard who played for the San Diego Chargers and Seattle Seahawks. He played college football at University of Hawaii.
