= Bob Horn (American football) =

American football player (born 1954)

No. 55
- Position: Linebacker

Personal information
- Born: February 6, 1954 (age 72); Salem, Oregon, U.S.
- Listed height: 6 ft 3 in (1.91 m)
- Listed weight: 235 lb (107 kg)

Career information
- High school: South Salem
- College: Oregon State
- NFL draft: 1976: 4th round, 94th overall pick

Career history
- San Diego Chargers (1976–1981); San Francisco 49ers (1982–1983); New Jersey Generals (1984)

Awards and highlights
- First-team All-Pac-8 (1975); Second-team All-Pac-8 (1974)

Career NFL statistics
- Interceptions: 7
- Fumble recoveries: 5
- Sacks: 1
- Stats at Pro Football Reference

Robert Horn (born February 6, 1954) is an American former professional football player who was a linebacker in the National Football League (NFL) from 1976 to 1983. He was a member of 1971 class 3 high school football championship team at South Salem High School. He played college football for the Oregon State Beavers from 1972 to 1975 and was selected by the San Diego Chargers in the fourth round of the 1976 NFL draft. He played six seasons for the Chargers from 1976 to 1981. He then played in the 1982 and 1983 seasons for the San Francisco 49ers. He concluded his playing career with the New Jersey Generals of the United States Football League (USFL) in 1984.
