= Hal Stringert =

American football player (born 1952)

No. 45
- Position: Defensive back

Personal information
- Born: January 5, 1952 (age 74); Honolulu, Hawaii, U.S.
- Listed height: 5 ft 10 in (1.78 m)
- Listed weight: 185 lb (84 kg)

Career information
- College: Hawaii; Willamette
- NFL draft: 1974: undrafted

Career history
- San Diego Chargers (1975–1980)

Career NFL statistics
- Games played - started: 69 - 27
- Interceptions: 8
- Fumble recoveries: 4
- Stats at Pro Football Reference

Harold Lloyd Stringert (born January 5, 1952) is an American former professional football player who was a defensive back for six seasons with the San Diego Chargers of the National Football League (NFL). He played college football for both Hawaii Rainbow Warriors and Willamette Bearcats.
