= Bob Rush (American football) =

American football player (born 1955)

No. 56, 53
- Position: Center

Personal information
- Born: February 27, 1955 (age 71); Santa Monica, California, U.S.
- Listed height: 6 ft 5 in (1.96 m)
- Listed weight: 265 lb (120 kg)

Career information
- High school: Northwest (TN)
- College: Memphis State
- NFL draft: 1977: 1st round, 24th overall pick

Career history
- San Diego Chargers (1977–1982); Kansas City Chiefs (1983–1985)

Awards and highlights
- PFWA All-Rookie Team (1977)

Career NFL statistics
- Games played: 117
- Games started: 59
- Fumble recoveries: 1
- Stats at Pro Football Reference

Robert Jeffrey Rush (born February 27, 1955) is an American former professional football player who was a center in the National Football League (NFL). He played college football for the Memphis State Tigers. He played in the NFL for the San Diego Chargers from 1977 to 1982 and the Kansas City Chiefs from 1983 to 1985. Fellow classmates recall that from August, 1970 to June, 1973 (his sophomore to senior years) Rush was a stand-out member of the varsity football team for the Northwest High School "Vikings" in Clarksville, Tennessee; he earned many recognitions at the regional and state levels.
