= Dwight McDonald =

American football player (born 1951)

No. 80, 89
- Position: Wide receiver

Personal information
- Born: May 24, 1951 (age 75); Nixon, Texas, U.S.
- Listed height: 6 ft 3 in (1.91 m)
- Listed weight: 185 lb (84 kg)

Career information
- High school: Kearny (San Diego, California)
- College: U.S. International; San Diego State
- NFL draft: 1975: undrafted

Career history
- San Diego Chargers (1975–1978)

Awards and highlights
- First-team All-Coast (1974)

Career NFL statistics
- Receptions: 46
- Receiving yards: 717
- Receiving touchdowns: 8
- Stats at Pro Football Reference

Dwight Vinson McDonald (born May 24, 1951) is an American former professional football player who was a wide receiver in the National Football League (NFL). He played for the San Diego Chargers from 1975 to 1978. He played college football at United States International Gulls football and San Diego State Aztecs.
