= Ray Preston (American football) =

American football player (born 1954)

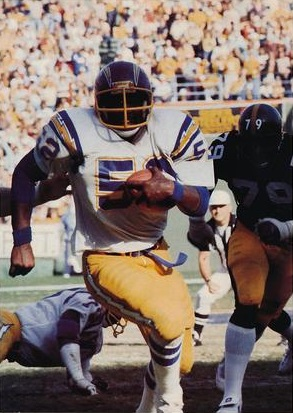
- Preston c. 1979

No. 52
- Position: Linebacker

Personal information
- Born: January 25, 1954 (age 72); Lawrence, Massachusetts, U.S.
- Listed height: 6 ft 0 in (1.83 m)
- Listed weight: 218 lb (99 kg)

Career information
- High school: Lawrence (MA)
- College: Syracuse
- NFL draft: 1976: 11th round, 295th overall pick

Career history
- San Diego Chargers (1976–1984)

Awards and highlights
- First-team All-American (1975); 2× First-team All-East (1974, 1975)

Career NFL statistics
- Sacks: 2
- Interceptions: 6
- Fumble recoveries: 4
- Stats at Pro Football Reference

Raymond Newton Preston Jr. (born January 25, 1954) is an American former professional football player who was a linebacker for nine years from 1976 to 1984 with the San Diego Chargers of the National Football League (NFL). Preston played college football at Syracuse University, where he earned All-American honors in 1975 and was a team captain. He was drafted in the eleventh round of the 1976 NFL draft by the Chargers.

His son, Duke Preston, was an offensive lineman for the Dallas Cowboys.
