= Artie Owens =

American football player (born 1953)

No. 85, 24, 49
- Positions: Running back, wide receiver

Personal information
- Born: January 14, 1953 (age 73); Montgomery, Alabama, U.S.
- Listed height: 5 ft 10 in (1.78 m)
- Listed weight: 176 lb (80 kg)

Career information
- High school: Stroudsburg (Stroudsburg, Pennsylvania)
- College: West Virginia
- NFL draft: 1976: 4th round, 115th overall pick

Career history
- San Diego Chargers (1976–1979); Buffalo Bills (1980); New Orleans Saints (1980); Philadelphia Stars (1983)

Awards and highlights
- 2× First-team All-East (1974, 1975)

Career NFL statistics
- Rushing attempts: 41
- Rushing yards: 154
- Receptions: 27
- Receiving yards: 418
- Total TDs: 3
- Stats at Pro Football Reference

Arthur Gene Owens (born January 14, 1953) is an American former professional football player who was a running back, return specialist, and wide receiver in the National Football League (NFL). He played college football for the West Virginia Mountaineers. He was also a track runner for the Mountaineers. Owens also played professionally in the United States Football League (USFL).

== Early life ==
Owens moved from Alabama to Pennsylvania as a youth. As a senior, he led the Stroudsburg High School Mountaineers to an 11-0 record and established Pennsylvania records for touchdowns, with 41, and yards rushing, with 2,061. He was named a Kodak All-American, UPI and AP all-state, all-Big 33, all-Lehigh Valley and all-Eastern Pennsylvania for Coach Fred Ross. Owens also was on the Mounties' basketball and track teams, and once ran the 100-yard dash in 9.8 seconds.

== College career ==
=== Football ===
Owens arrived at West Virginia University in 1972. He saw limited time as a freshman, only rushing for 72 yards and one touchdown. He also had 369 return yards, along with an 85-yard kick return.

As a sophomore in 1973, Owens was the projected starter at the beginning of the season. But an injury led to newcomer Dwayne Woods to assume to role for the rest of the season. Owens only rushed for 391 yards and 3 touchdowns, but he did have 291 return yards with a kick return touchdown of 95 yards against Penn State. His sophomore season marked his final season of returning punts.

In his junior season of 1974, Owens went injury-free as he finally started through a whole season. His stats showed as well, as he rushed for a career-high 1,130 yards and 7 touchdowns, including an 85-yard run. He also had 301 kick returns yards, including a 73-yard return.

In his final season as a Mountaineer, 1975, Owens rushed for 1,055 yards and 5 touchdowns, with a 6.6 yards per carry average. He had a career-low 213 kick return yards, but a career-high 125 receiving yards and one receiving touchdown.

Owens rushed for a then-school record 2,648 yards (now fourth on the career list), and set a record for career all-purpose rushing yardage with 3,971 yards (now third on the career list). His 6.4 career average for yards per carry is one of the best averages in school history and his 13 career 100-yard rushing games was a school record as well. After playing four seasons, Owens' 95-yard kick return for a touchdown as a junior was third-longest in school history. He received his degree at WVU in 2004.

=== Track ===
As a freshman, Owens tied a 41-year-old WVU record for the 100 yard dash by clocking a 9.6. He later bettered that mark with a 9.5, a record he shares with fellow two-sport star Harry Blake. Owens and Blake also teamed to set Mountaineer records in the 440- and 880-yard relays, and three times won the prestigious Penn Relays.

== Professional career ==
=== San Diego Chargers ===
Owens was selected in the fourth round of the 1976 NFL draft by the San Diego Chargers as a receiver rather than a running back. Owens played with the Chargers for four seasons.

He started his pro career out in 1976, playing in 14 games. Although seeing some playing time, Owens only recorded 54 yards on three catches, along with one touchdown. In 1977, Owens saw no time at receiver, but did have one rush for three yards.

=== After San Diego ===
Following his season in 1979, Owens was picked up by the Buffalo Bills. He saw no action in 1980 with the Bills, and four games into the season he was traded to the New Orleans Saints. Owens saw no action with the 1-15 Saints either, and eventually retired after only 3 games in New Orleans.

=== USFL ===
Three years after retiring from the NFL, Owens returned to professional football in 1983. He played for the Philadelphia Stars in the USFL for one season, before retiring from football for good.

== Personal life ==
Owens moved back to Stroudsburg, where he instructed an alternative school for the mentally handicapped. He also assumed coaching roles at Stroudsburg High School, leading the school's 1984 team to an undefeated season.

Owens attempted construction work in 1986, and after he finished it in 1987, he returned to his mental health profession. He currently works preparing mentally handicapped adults for their future lives.
