= John Lee (defensive lineman) =

American football player (1953–2024)

No. 66, 69
- Position: Defensive end

Personal information
- Born: February 17, 1953; Fort Monmouth, New Jersey, U.S.
- Died: August 16, 2024 (aged 71)
- Listed height: 6 ft 2 in (1.88 m)
- Listed weight: 255 lb (116 kg)

Career information
- High school: Red Bank Regional (Little Silver, New Jersey)
- College: Nebraska
- NFL draft: 1976: 13th round, 351st overall pick

Career history
- San Diego Chargers (1976–1980); New England Patriots (1981)

Awards and highlights
- Second-team All-Big Eight (1975)

Career NFL statistics
- Sacks: 7.5
- Fumble recoveries: 2
- Stats at Pro Football Reference

John Dana Lee (February 17, 1953 – August 16, 2024) was an American professional football player who was a defensive end in the National Football League (NFL) for the San Diego Chargers and New England Patriots and in the United States Football League (USFL) for the Chicago Blitz and Arizona Wranglers. He played college football for the Nebraska Cornhuskers. Lee died on August 16, 2024, at the age of 71.
