= Johnny Sanders =

American football executive (1922–1990)

Personal information
- Born: July 22, 1922; San Antonio, Texas, U.S.
- Died: October 26, 1990 (aged 68); La Mesa, California, U.S.

Career information
- High school: Van Nuys (Los Angeles, California)
- College: Occidental

Career history
- Los Angeles Rams (1952–1974); Scout (1952–1963); Director of player personnel (1964–1968); Assistant general manager (1969–1974); San Diego Chargers (1975–1987); Assistant for player personnel (1975); General manager (1976–1986); Assistant director of football operations (1987)

Awards and highlights
- NFL Executive of the Year (1979)
- Executive profile at Pro Football Reference

Johnny Sanders (July 22, 1922 – October 26, 1990) was an American professional football executive in the National Football League (NFL). He was the general manager of the San Diego Chargers for 11 seasons from 1976 until 1986, developing them into a Super Bowl contender. He was named the NFL executive of the year by Sporting News in 1979.

== Early life ==
Sanders was born in San Antonio, Texas, and played football at Van Nuys High School in Los Angeles. He played college football as a halfback at Occidental College. Sanders was a starter on their 1948 squad that went 9–0 and defeated Colorado A&M in the Raisin Bowl.

== Professional career ==
Sanders joined the Los Angeles Rams as a part-time scout in 1952, and was named director of player personnel in 1964. He became their assistant general manager in 1969, while also continuing as the team's chief scout.

Sanders joined the San Diego Chargers in 1975 as owner Gene Klein's assistant for player personnel. Klein promoted him to general manager in 1976 to replace the fired Harland Svare. Sanders was named the Sporting News NFL Executive of the Year in 1979. He helped assemble Chargers teams, led by coach Don Coryell and his record-setting Air Coryell pass offense, which twice advanced to American Football Conference (AFC) championship games, falling short of the Super Bowl both times in 1980 and 1981. Under Sanders as the general manager, the Chargers won three straight AFC West division titles (1979–1981) and qualified for the NFL playoffs four times. He rarely spoke publicly while working under Klein, who generally spoke for Chargers' management.

Sanders' notable draft picks included Gary Anderson, James Brooks, Gill Byrd, John Jefferson, Jim Lachey, Leslie O'Neal, Ralf Mojsiejenko, Billy Ray Smith, Lee Williams and Kellen Winslow. Other players he acquired include Rolf Benirschke, Charlie Joiner, Chuck Muncie and Wes Chandler. After a 4–12 season in 1986, new Chargers owner Alex Spanos demoted Sanders. The team had not had a winning record since 1982. In his final year with San Diego in 1987, Sanders was the assistant director of football operations.

After leaving the Chargers, Sanders was unsuccessful in bringing an Arena Football League team to San Diego. He was later an administrative consultant for the San Diego Gulls, who were a first-year franchise in the International Hockey League in 1990.

== Personal life ==
Sanders died of apparent heart failure on October 26, 1990, at Grossmont Hospital in La Mesa, California. He was 68.
