= Don Macek =

American football player (born 1954)

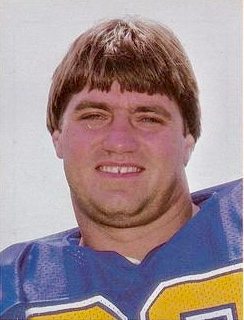
- Macek with the San Diego Chargers c. 1982

No. 62
- Position: Center

Personal information
- Born: July 21, 1954 (age 72); Manchester, New Hampshire, U.S.
- Listed height: 6 ft 3 in (1.91 m)
- Listed weight: 261 lb (118 kg)

Career information
- High school: Manchester Central (Manchester, New Hampshire)
- College: Boston College
- NFL draft: 1976: 2nd round, 31st overall pick

Career history
- San Diego Chargers (1976–1989)

Awards and highlights
- PFWA All-Rookie Team (1976); Los Angeles Chargers Hall of Fame; San Diego Chargers 50th Anniversary Team; San Diego Chargers 40th Anniversary Team; First-team All-East (1975)

Career NFL statistics
- Games played: 162
- Games started: 150
- Fumble recoveries: 7
- Stats at Pro Football Reference

Donald Matthew Macek (born July 21, 1954) is an American former professional football player who was a center in the National Football League (NFL) for the San Diego Chargers for fourteen seasons. Macek played college football for the Boston College Eagles. He was drafted by the Chargers in the second round of the 1976 NFL draft. Despite being underrated throughout his career, some have considered him among the top performing NFL centers during the 1980s and the best Charger at that position up to that point in time. In 1991, he was inducted into the Boston College Varsity Club Athletic Hall of Fame and to the Chargers Hall of Fame in 2004.

== Professional career ==
Macek was drafted by the Chargers in the second of the 1976 NFL draft as a guard and later re-positioned as a center in 1979. He went on to play 14 seasons for San Diego where he missed only 8 starts in 163 career games. Macek was known for his durability and the integral role he played on the team's offensive line, which provided cover for Pro Football Hall of Fame quarterback Dan Fouts through most of the 1980s. That Chargers' offensive line allowed the fewest sacks per pass attempt in the NFL from 1981-1983. Upon his retirement in 1990, Macek ranked fifth on the team in games played and tied for third in seasons played. In 2004, Macek and his teammate Ed White were inducted into the Chargers Hall of Fame. The two played together for the Chargers from 1978 to 1985. Macek was an alternate for several Pro Bowls during his career.
