= Don Goode =

American football player (born 1951)

No. 50
- Position: Linebacker

Personal information
- Born: June 21, 1951 (age 75); Houston, Texas, U.S.
- Listed height: 6 ft 2 in (1.88 m)
- Listed weight: 234 lb (106 kg)

Career information
- High school: Booker T. Washington (TX)
- College: Kansas
- NFL draft: 1974: 1st round, 15th overall pick

Career history
- San Diego Chargers (1974–1979); Cleveland Browns (1980–1981)

Career NFL statistics
- Sacks: 9
- Fumble recoveries: 1
- Interceptions: 10
- Stats at Pro Football Reference

Donald Ray Goode (born June 21, 1951), is an American former professional football player who was a linebacker in the National Football League (NFL). He played for the San Diego Chargers from 1974 to 1979 and for the Cleveland Browns from 1980 to 1981. He played high school football at Booker T. Washington High School and he played college football at the University of Kansas. He was selected in the first round (15th overall) by the Chargers in the 1974 NFL draft.

== Personal life ==
Goode's nephew is Cameron Goode.
