= Russ Washington =

American football player (1946–2021)

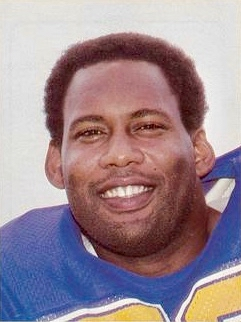
- Washington with the San Diego Chargers c. 1982

No. 85, 70
- Position: Offensive tackle

Personal information
- Born: December 17, 1946; Kansas City, Missouri, U.S.
- Died: August 5, 2021 (aged 74); San Diego, California, U.S.
- Listed height: 6 ft 6 in (1.98 m)
- Listed weight: 289 lb (131 kg)

Career information
- High school: Southeast (Kansas City)
- College: Missouri (1964–1967)
- NFL draft: 1968: 1st round, 4th overall pick

Career history
- San Diego Chargers (1968–1982)

Awards and highlights
- First-team All-Pro (1978); 3× Second-team All-Pro (1974, 1979, 1982); 5× Pro Bowl (1974, 1975, 1977–1979); San Diego Chargers 50th Anniversary Team; San Diego Chargers 40th Anniversary Team; Los Angeles Chargers Hall of Fame; Second-team All-American (1967); First-team All-Big Eight (1967); Second-team All-Big Eight (1965)

Career NFL/AFL statistics
- Games played: 200
- Games started: 196
- Fumble recoveries: 7
- Stats at Pro Football Reference

Russell Eugene Washington (December 17, 1946 – August 5, 2021) was an American professional football offensive tackle who played for the San Diego Chargers of the American Football League (AFL) and National Football League (NFL) from 1968 to 1982, playing his first two seasons as a defensive tackle. He was selected in the first round of the 1968 NFL/AFL draft with the fourth overall pick. He played college football for the Missouri Tigers.

Washington was noted for his size (6 foot 6 inches, close to 300 pounds) and durability. A one-team player, he played in 200 games for the Chargers, including a 148-game streak as their starting right tackle that lasted over a decade. A strong player on a weak team throughout much of his career, his only playoff appearances came in his last four seasons. During this time he was part of an experienced offensive line that played a key role in the record-breaking Air Coryell passing attack.

== College career ==
Described by the St. Louis Post-Dispatch as a "widely-sought recruit", Washington signed for the Missouri Tigers in 1964. He became a starting defensive end the following year, and was voted the Big Eight lineman of the year despite missing two games with a knee injury. Washington scored his only career touchdown during his junior year, blocking a punt and then returning it to the end zone during a loss to UCLA. He suffered another knee injury that year, missing six games. Entering his senior year, the Sedalia Democrat described Washington as one of the few "glittering stars" in the Tigers ranks. Missouri switched him to offensive tackle that year, though he still played defensive end and defensive tackle sometimes when replacing injured teammates, as well as fullback on some plays. Washington won numerous honors at season's end, being voted Associated Press first-team All-Big Eight, The Sporting News first-team All-American, and Newspaper Enterprise Association (NEA) second team All-American.

== Professional career ==
=== Defensive tackle (1968–1969) ===
The San Diego Chargers selected Washington in the first round with the fourth overall pick in January's 1968 NFL/AFL common draft, and he signed for them in May. San Diego opted to use him as a defensive lineman, hoping to improve a weak pass rush and boost a defense that had ranked last in the league the previous season. During his rookie season, Washington appeared on the scoresheet for the only time in his professional career, sharing a safety with teammate Steve DeLong during a victory over the Denver Broncos. He received 2 of the available 29 votes for the American Football League defensive player of the year award. Washington returned for a second year on defense, but had difficulty catching opposing quarterbacks.

=== Offensive tackle (1970–1982) ===
San Diego switched Washington to offensive tackle in 1970 after a training camp session where he filled in for the injured Gene Ferguson. In one of his first games at the new position he was repeatedly beaten by Hall of Fame defensive end Deacon Jones, who had three sacks. Entering 1971, a United Press International (UPI) article listed Washington's ability to master playing at offensive tackle as a question mark that would determine the line's effectiveness; they went on to lead the AFC in pass protection, allowing 19 sacks in 14 games. After the 1972 season, sports journalist Murray Olderman rated the offense line as probably the Chargers' best unit and "comparable with any in the league." Washington earned an individual honor in 1973, as UPI placed him in their All-AFC second team. He was also voted the Chargers' MVP by his teammates.

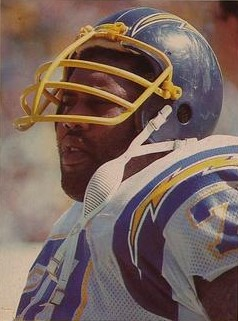
Washington c. 1981

Washington was voted to the Pro Bowl five times in the six-year period from 1974 to 1979. In the first two of these, 1974 and 1975, he was the only player on his team to gain the honor; an Escondido Times-Advocate article written between these seasons dubbed him "the closest thing the Chargers have to being a superstar." Washington missed the Pro Bowl in 1976 but the Chargers, a losing team throughout most of his career, began to improve during that season. San Diego head coach Tommy Prothro had been rebuilding the team extensively, with Washington and fellow lineman Doug Wilkerson entering the 1977 season as the only two players on the roster who had been Chargers for more than three years. (Note: A third, quarterback Dan Fouts, returned from a holdout later in the year.) Washington was again a Pro Bowler that year, and also won the Forrest Gregg offensive lineman of the year award. He set a new club record for consecutive appearances during 1978, passing the old record of 153 shared by Walt Sweeney and John Hadl. In addition to another Pro Bowl appearance, Washington was named a first-team All-Pro in the player-voted NEA awards. With the team having improved under new head coach Don Coryell, Washington entered the 1979 season hopeful of making his first playoff appearance in his 12th year in San Diego. Aided by another Pro Bowl season from Washington, the Chargers managed to clinch the AFC West division title in the final game of the season. He said, "All those years, I never gave up. I'm an optimist. I always thought it would get better. I thought there would be a day like this." The Chargers disappointed in the playoffs, losing at home to the Houston Oilers in their first game.

In 1980, Washington missed games due to injury for the first time in his professional career. During a week 6 defeat to the Oakland Raiders, Washington had his left foot planted while blocking John Matuszak, and was struck from that side; his cleats got caught in the turf, resulting in torn knee ligaments and a dislocated knee and kneecap. The injury put him out for the season, ending streaks of 178 consecutive appearances and 148 consecutive starts. Washington was bothered by his knee for most of 1981, but he was still a standout player, and played in all but three games. The strike-shortened 1982 season proved to be Washington's last in the league. He was part of a veteran offensive line that played in every game and only allowed quarterback Dan Fouts to be sacked twelve times in nine regular season games despite the San Diego offense revolving around the pass. (Note: His fellow linemen were Billy Shields, Doug Wilkerson, Don Macek and Ed White.) Fouts had broken numerous passing records by this time, and gave his line a lot of the credit for this success.

"I figure I've been really blessed to play as long as I have. Since I've been out of college, most of the good things that happened to me happened because I was a Charger. I have nothing to be bitter about at all."

— Washington, on being cut after fifteen years with the Chargers.

Washington planned to continue his career in 1983 and signed a new contract during the offseason, but was surprisingly waived in favor of Andrew Gissinger shortly before the season began. San Diego made the playoffs in each of Washington's last four seasons, though they never reached the Super Bowl. The Chargers were less effective at pass protection after the departure of Washington and some of his fellow linemen and did not reach the playoffs again until 1992.

=== Legacy ===
Standing at 6 foot 6 inches tall (Note: Some sources list Washington at 6 foot 7 inches.) and with a playing weight close to 300 pounds, Washington was among the largest players of his era. His teammates nicknames him "Big Rew" due to his initials (R.E.W.) and his size. Bum Phillips, Washington's defensive coordinator during the first two years of his career, described him as "so big, he looks like a haystack with a tarpaulin thrown over it," while Hall of Fame defensive end Howie Long said that facing Washington was like "trying to throw a condo." He also possessed good technique according to another opposing lineman, Jerry Mays: "Washington is not at all susceptible to being turned or twisted." Teammate Ed White described him as "an extremely fluid athlete, who stymies people, engulfs them on the line". Street & Smith's named him as one of their two offensive tackles for their 1970s all-decade team.

Washington was described as quiet but friendly by both teammates and journalists, with one reporter writing that he was "hard to find and easy to talk to." His durability led him to start at right tackle in every game for over a decade. He set franchise records for appearances (200), starts (196), consecutive appearances (178) and consecutive starts (148). The Chargers inducted him into their Hall of Fame in 1995, and he was later voted to the franchise's 40th and 50th anniversary teams. Other organizations to honor Washington were the Greater Kansas City Football Coaches Association and the San Diego–based Breitbard Hall of Fame.

== Personal life ==
Washington owned various businesses after retirement, including a car wash in National City, California. He was married to Inez, a native of Paata. Washington would spend time between seasons living on with her on Paata, an island in Chuuk State with a population of approximately 600 in 1982. The couple had two children.

Washington died on August 5, 2021, at the age of 74. No cause of death was given.

== Career statistics ==
Season	Team	Pos.	GP	GS
1968	San Diego	DT	14	12
1969	San Diego	DT	14	13
1970	San Diego	T	14	13
1971	San Diego	T	14	14
1972	San Diego	T	14	14
1973	San Diego	T	14	14
1974	San Diego	T	14	14
1975	San Diego	T	14	14
1976	San Diego	T	14	14
1977	San Diego	T	14	14
1978	San Diego	T	16	16
1979	San Diego	T	16	16
1980	San Diego	T	6	6
1981	San Diego	T	13	13
1982	San Diego	T	9	9
Career			200	196

== Accolades ==
=== Collegiate ===
- AP first-team All-Big Eight (1967)
- TSN first-team All-American (1967)
- NEA second-team All-American (1967)

=== Professional ===
- 2× AP second-team All-Pro (1979, 1982)
- NEA first-team All-Pro (1978)
- 2× NEA second-team All-Pro (1974, 1979)
- 5× Pro Bowl (1974, 1975, 1977, 1978, 1979)
- Forrest Gregg Offensive Lineman of the Year (1977)
- Los Angeles Chargers Hall of Fame (1995)
- Breitbard Hall of Fame (2002)
- Greater Kansas City Football Coaches Association Hall of Fame (2016)
- San Diego Chargers 40th Anniversary Team
- San Diego Chargers 50th Anniversary Team
