= San Diego Chargers 50th Anniversary Team =

2009 list of personnel of the San Diego Chargers

The San Diego Chargers (now Los Angeles) announced their 50th anniversary team in 2009 to honor the top players and coaches in the history of the National Football League team. The Chargers were founded in 1959 as part of the American Football League. The anniversary team included 53 players and coaches selected from 103 nominees. The Chargers originally stated that only 50 members would be selected; the group is still sometimes referred to as the 50 Greatest Chargers. Online voting by fans accounted for 50 percent of the voting results; votes from Chargers Hall of Famers and five members of the local media made up for the other 50 percent. Over 400,000 votes were cast online. Dan Fouts and LaDainian Tomlinson received the first and second most votes, respectively. The team features eight Pro Football Hall of Fame members and 11 players that were active on the 2009 Chargers team.

== Key ==
Key
*	Member of Pro Football Hall of Fame
Years	Years with the Chargers

== Offense ==
Position	Player	Years	Ref
QB	Dan Fouts*	1973–1987	
QB	John Hadl	1962–1972	
QB	Stan Humphries	1992–1997	
QB	Philip Rivers	2004–2019	
RB	Keith Lincoln	1961–1966, 1968	
RB	Paul Lowe	1960–1968	
RB	Natrone Means	1993–1995, 1998–1999	
RB	Chuck Muncie	1980–1984	
RB	LaDainian Tomlinson*	2001–2009	
WR	Lance Alworth*	1962–1970	
WR	Wes Chandler	1981–1987	
WR	Gary Garrison	1966–1976	
WR	John Jefferson	1978–1980	
WR	Charlie Joiner*	1976–1986	
TE	Antonio Gates*	2003–2018	
TE	Kellen Winslow*	1979–1987	
T	Ron Mix*	1960–1969	
T	Russ Washington	1968–1982	
T	Ernie Wright	1960–1967, 1972	
G	Kris Dielman	2003–2011	
G	Walt Sweeney	1963–1970	
G	Ed White	1978–1985	
G	Doug Wilkerson	1971–1984	
C	Nick Hardwick	2004–2014	
C	Don Macek	1976–1989	

== Defense ==
Position	Player	Years	Ref
DE	Fred Dean*	1975–1981	
DE	Earl Faison	1961–1966	
DE	Leslie O'Neal	1986–1995	
DT	Gary Johnson	1975–1984	
DT	Louie Kelcher	1975–1983	
DT	Ernie Ladd	1961–1965	
DT	Jamal Williams	1998–2009	
LB	Chuck Allen	1961–1969	
LB	Woodrow Lowe	1976–1986	
LB	Shawne Merriman	2005–2010	
LB	Junior Seau*	1990–2002	
LB	Billy Ray Smith	1983–1992	
DB	Willie Buchanon	1979–1982	
DB	Gill Byrd	1983–1992	
DB	Rodney Harrison	1994–2002	
DB	Quentin Jammer	2002–2012	
DB	Charlie McNeil	1960–1964	

== Special teams ==
Position	Players	Years	Ref
K	Rolf Benirschke	1977–1986	
K	John Carney	1990–2000	
KR	Speedy Duncan	1964–1970	
KR	Darren Sproles	2005–2010	
P	Darren Bennett	1995–2003	
P	Mike Scifres	2003–2015	
ST	Hank Bauer	1977–1982	
ST	Kassim Osgood	2003–2009	

== Coaches ==
Coach	Years	Ref
Don Coryell*	1978–1986	
Sid Gillman*	1960–1971	
Bobby Ross	1992–1996	

== See also ==
- San Diego Chargers 40th Anniversary Team
- Los Angeles Chargers Hall of Fame
