= Speedy Duncan =

American football player (1942–2021)

No. 45
- Positions: Cornerback, return specialist

Personal information
- Born: August 10, 1942; Tuscaloosa, Alabama, U.S.
- Died: December 9, 2021 (aged 79)
- Listed height: 5 ft 10 in (1.78 m)
- Listed weight: 180 lb (82 kg)

Career information
- High school: Druid (Tuscaloosa)
- College: Jackson State (1960–1963)
- AFL draft: 1964: undrafted

Career history
- San Diego Chargers (1964–1970); Washington Redskins (1971–1974)

Awards and highlights
- 3× Second-team All-AFL (1965–1967); Pro Bowl (1971); 3× AFL All-Star (1965–1967); Los Angeles Chargers Hall of Fame; San Diego Chargers 50th Anniversary Team; San Diego Chargers 40th Anniversary Team

Career statistics
- Interceptions: 24
- Interception yards: 328
- Fumble recoveries: 4
- Defensive touchdowns: 5
- Punt return yards: 2,201
- Kickoff return yards: 4,539
- Return touchdowns: 4
- Stats at Pro Football Reference

Leslie Herbert "Speedy" Duncan (August 10, 1942 – December 9, 2021) was an American professional football player who was a cornerback and return specialist in the American Football League (AFL) and National Football League (NFL). He played college football for the Jackson State Tigers. Duncan played seven seasons with the San Diego Chargers, where he was a three-time AFL All-Star. He was also named to the Pro Bowl with the Washington Redskins. Duncan was inducted into the Chargers Hall of Fame and was named to their 40th and 50th anniversary teams.

He was the first punt returner in AFL history to return two punts for touchdowns in a season. His punt returning was so feared in the AFL, that it altered the way in which teams punted. He led the AFL in punt return average twice and the NFL once. He was the first player in AFL history to return an interception 100 yards for a touchdown.

== Early life ==
Duncan was born on August 10, 1942, in Tuscaloosa, Alabama. Duncan attended Druid High School in Tuscaloosa, where he starred on the football team. He was a halfback and kick returner. In a mid-October 1958 game against undefeated Howard High School of Chattanooga, Tennessee, the 156 lb (70.8 kg) junior Duncan scored five touchdowns, including rushing touchdowns of 40 and 70 yards, and a 50-yard touchdown reception. As a senior, he scored 26 touchdowns and led his team to an 11–0 record.

== College career ==
Duncan could not attend the University of Alabama when he graduated high school because of racial segregation. He attended Jackson State University, an HBCU school in Jackson, Mississippi. He played for the Tigers football team in the Southwest Athletic Conference (SWAC), and was a member of the track team. One of his football teammates was future NFL receiver Willie Richardson. Duncan was a halfback and kick returner on the football team. In an early December 1962 game against Tennessee A & I State University, he returned a punt 70 or 73 yards for a touchdown.

In both Duncan's sophomore and junior seasons (1961 and 1962), Jackson State was the Southwest Athletic Conference champion. Duncan averaged 43.2 rushing yards per game in 1962. As a sophomore, his coach had Duncan learn to tackle and play defense by having the team run at him. The Tigers defeated Florida A & M in the December 8, 1962 Orange Blossom Classic, making Jackson State that year's HBCU champion. Duncan figured prominently in the 22–6 Orange Blossom victory. He suffered a leg injury at the beginning of the 1963 season, but became one of the SWAC's top receivers as the season progressed, becoming a double threat running and receiving. Still, he missed seven games that season, hurting his chances to be drafted by a professional football team.

He was also a track star at Jackson State. He was the track team captain in 1962. Duncan acquired the nickname "Speedy" at Jackson State, after setting a record by running the 220-yard dash in 21 seconds.

== Professional career ==
=== San Diego Chargers ===
Duncan was not drafted in 1964. He was signed as a free agent by Chargers scout Al LoCasale in April 1964, with the promise that he would only get a contract if he made the team. LoCasale was one of the AFL's original football executives. LoCasale had come to Jackson State's campus to scout other players, including Willie Richardson. In one version of events, Richardson recommended Duncan to LoCasale, who said Duncan was too small at 5 ft 6 in (1.68 m). Richardson said that was not the case, and Duncan was 5 ft 10 in (1.78 m). After LoCasale himself measured Duncan, he realized the rumors of Duncan's height were false, and signed Duncan for the Chargers.

In another version of the story, Duncan knew LoCasale was recruiting on campus and approached LoCasale, saying he wanted to become a professional player. LoCasale told Duncan that scouting reports said Duncan was too small, being only 5 ft 7 in (1.7 m). LoCasale measured Duncan himself, and found Duncan to be 5 ft 10.5 in (1.79 m), and signed him as a free agent. In either event, future Hall of Fame head coach Sid Gillman decided to keep Duncan on the team after seeing him run the 40-yard dash in 4.4 seconds, the fastest of any player in the Chargers' training camp; and intercepting two passes in a training camp scrimmage. Duncan later said there was a quota for the number of black players kept on a team, but he was determined to stand out and be among those selected.

As a rookie with the Chargers in 1964, Duncan was a reserve defensive back at safety. He was placed on the injured deferred list in late August, and only appeared in five games that season, with one interception. He returned nine kickoffs for 318 yards (35.3 yards per return), including a 91-yard kickoff return against the New York Jets on December 6. He also returned four punts for 19 yards.

In 1965, Duncan became a starter at cornerback in place of an injured Dick Westmoreland. He started 14 games at right cornerback, with four interceptions and two fumble recoveries. Duncan returned 30 punts for 464 yards, averaging 15.5 yards per punt return, leading the AFL in punt return yardage and average per return. Duncan also returned 26 kickoffs for 612 yards (23.5 yards per kickoff return), and led the AFL in combined kickoff and punt return yardage (1,076).

Duncan returned two punts for touchdowns in 1965. On September 26, 1965, he returned a punt 64 yards for a touchdown against the Kansas City Chiefs; the Chargers' only touchdown in a 10–10 tie. He also had a 63-yard punt return for a touchdown in the first quarter of a December 12 game against the Houston Oilers. This made him the first player in AFL history to have two touchdowns in a season on punt returns. Duncan was selected to play in the AFL All-Star Game after the 1965 season. He was named first-team All-AFL by the Newspaper Enterprise Association (NEA) and second-team All-AFL by the Associated Press (AP). The Chargers were 9–3–2 that season, losing to the Buffalo Bills in the AFL championship game, 23–0. Duncan had a 49 yard kickoff return in the championship game.

In 1966, Duncan started 13 games at right cornerback, with seven interceptions, fifth best in the AFL. He returned 18 punts for 238 yards, leading the AFL with a 13.2 yard per punt return average, with the third most returns in the AFL. He was second in the AFL in combined kickoff and punt return yardage. He returned 25 kickoffs for 642 yards (25.7 yards per kickoff return). He was once again selected to play in the AFL All-Star Game.

Duncan was named second-team All-AFL by the AFL, AP, and United Press International (UPI) for his performance in 1966. In the first game of 1966, Duncan had an 81-yard touchdown return of a punt against the Buffalo Bills. Duncan had three interceptions in a late-September 1966 game against the Oakland Raiders, tying a franchise record. The Associated Press named him the AFL's Defensive Player of the Week for that game.

In 1967, Duncan started all 14 games at right cornerback, with two interceptions and one fumble recovery. Duncan scored two touchdowns on defense in an October 15, 1967 game against the Kansas City Chiefs. He had an interception against future Hall of Fame quarterback Len Dawson, and returned it 100 yards for a touchdown; the longest touchdown return in AFL history at the time. Earlier in the same game, he recovered a Mike Garrett fumble and returned it 35 yards for another touchdown. That year, Duncan returned 36 punts for 434 yards, and nine kickoffs for 231 yards. His 12.1 yards per punt return was second in the AFL that season.

Duncan was selected to play in the AFL All-Star Game for a third consecutive year. During the January 1968 All-Star Game, he returned a kickoff 90 yards for a touchdown. He was named second-team All-AFL by The Sporting News, AP, and NEA.

In 1968, Duncan started eight games at right cornerback, with one interception. He injured and reinjured a thigh muscle during the season that limited his playing time. It was the worst injury in his life up to that time. He broke his own team record with a 95-yard touchdown punt return against the New York Jets on November 24. He also had a 53-yard kickoff return in the game. This was the last punt return for a touchdown in his career. That year, he returned 18 punts for 206 yards and 25 kickoffs for 586 yards. His 11.4 yards per return was third best in the AFL.

In 1969, he started 10 games at right cornerback, with six interceptions. In a November 16 game against the Oakland Raiders, Duncan intercepted two Daryle Lamonica passes. He returned one of those interceptions 72 yards for a touchdown, avoiding almost every Oakland Raider in moving from the middle of the field and cutting down the left sideline to score. After 1969, he did not start another game at cornerback over the final five years of his career. That season he returned 27 punts for 280 yards, and 21 kickoffs for 587 yards. His 10.4 yards per punt return was second in the AFL.

1970 was his final year with the Chargers, now in the merged National Football League (NFL). He suffered a knee injury that season and played in only six games, without starting any on defense. He had five punt returns for 10 yards and 19 kickoff returns for 410 yards.

Over his seven-year Chargers' career, Duncan's 21 interceptions with the Chargers rank seventh in team history. Duncan averaged 12.0 yards per punt return with the Chargers, returning four for touchdowns. He averaged 25.3 yards on 134 kickoff returns.

=== Washington Redskins ===
In May 1971, the Chargers traded Duncan to the Washington Redskins for two 1973 draft choices. Duncan inadvertently broke one of head coach George Allen's ribs running into the coach in a mid-September 1971 practice. Playing in Washington under coach George Allen, Duncan became a nickelback, backing up Pat Fischer and Mike Bass, while also returning punts and kickoffs. He played in 14 games and led the NFL in punt return average at 10.6 yards per return in 1971. In a December 13, 1971 game against the Los Angeles Rams, he intercepted a Roman Gabriel pass and returned it 46 yards for a touchdown; the third time he had returned an interception for a touchdown in his career. Duncan was selected to play in the Pro Bowl after the 1971 season.

Washington finished the season 9–4–1, and lost to the San Francisco 49ers in the first round of the 1971–72 NFC playoffs, 24–20. In that playoff game Duncan returned three kickoffs for 170 yards, and three punts for 11 yards. He returned a second half kickoff 67 yards, but Washington only reached the 49ers 11-yard line when they were stopped on a fourth down and inches run.

In 1972, Duncan held out during training camp over a salary dispute with Washington, stating Washington was not bargaining with him in good faith. Duncan was with the team by the first game of the season. Allen used return specialist Alvin Haymond in place of Duncan as a returner later in 1972, and Duncan only played in eight games. He had one interception, returned 11 punts for 70 yards, and 15 kickoffs for 364 yards. Washington reached the Super Bowl that season, but Duncan was injured before the start of the playoffs and Haymond was the primary punt and kickoff returner in the postseason.

In 1973, Duncan appeared in all 14 Washington games, with one interception. He returned 28 punts for 228 yards, and four kickoffs for 65 yards. Washington lost 27–20 in the first round of the 1973–74 NFC playoffs, with Duncan being beaten on a 28-yard touchdown pass from Fran Tarkenton to John Gilliam in that game. He returned three punts for eight yards in that game. In 1974, Duncan's final professional season, he was solely a returner, playing in just two games and returning three punts.

Over his 11-year career, Duncan returned 202 punts for 2,201 yards (10.9 yards per punt return) and four touchdowns. He returned 180 kickoffs for 4,539 yards (25.2 yards per kickoff return). He had 24 interceptions and three interception returns for touchdowns. He was listed at 5 ft 10 in (1.78 m) 180 lb (82 kg) during his professional career.

== Legacy and honors ==
Duncan ran the 40-yard dash in 4.4 seconds. Duncan's punt returning ability changed the way teams played during his early years in the AFL. By 1966, instead of punting the ball as far as possible, punters facing Duncan began punting for field position or height to avoid his long returns. Duncan observed during the 1966 season that his ability to break long returns had been reduced by punters kicking away from him or kicking the ball very high. Of 38 punts to the Chargers by early November, only 12 had been kicked to Duncan.

In 1971, he became one of only six professional players to have gained more than 5,000 combined punt and kickoff return yards in a career (Washington teammate Alvin Haymond being one of the other five). Duncan said punt returning was more dangerous than returning kickoffs, but had the potential for bigger plays. Duncan observed returners had to be tough because the players on special teams ("suicide squad") trying to stop the kick returner would not only tackle him, but try to intimidate the returner with extra blows and threats of future punishment after the play was over. His skill in punt returning was based on having "nerves of steel", a quick start, the ability to change directions in an instant, and "knowing how to give with the blow when I get hit".

In 1995, Duncan was inducted into the Chargers Hall of Fame. He was named to their 40th and 50th anniversary teams. In 2016, he was inducted into the Jackson State Sports Hall of Fame.

== Personal life and death ==
While in high school he was a golf caddie at the Tuscaloosa Country Club. During his college and pro career, Duncan was a soul and/or rock-and-roll singer in nightclubs, chiefly on the West Coast. He sang with a group called the Satellites. He made $12 to $20 per night while singing in college, which he needed to support himself during his time at Jackson State. He was also known for his modern style of "sharp" dressing during his playing days.

After his playing career, Duncan returned to San Diego and dabbled in the restaurant business. He also taught at local schools, later moving to Stockton, California, where he was a health and physical education teacher at Webster Middle School.

On December 9, 2021, Duncan died at the age of 79.

== See also ==
- List of American Football League players
