= Walt Sweeney =

American football player (1941–2013)

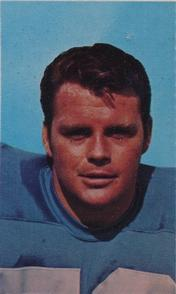
- Sweeney c. 1969

No. 78
- Position: Guard

Personal information
- Born: April 18, 1941; Cohasset, Massachusetts, U.S.
- Died: February 2, 2013 (aged 71); San Diego, California, U.S.
- Listed height: 6 ft 4 in (1.93 m)
- Listed weight: 256 lb (116 kg)

Career information
- High school: Cohasset
- College: Syracuse (1959–1962)
- NFL draft: 1963: 8th round, 107th overall pick
- AFL draft: 1963: 1st round, 2nd overall pick

Career history
- San Diego Chargers (1963–1973); Washington Redskins (1974–1975)

Awards and highlights
- AFL champion (1963); 2× First-team All-AFL (1967, 1968); 2× Second-team All-AFL (1965, 1969); 6× AFL All-Star (1964–1969); 3× Pro Bowl (1970–1972); Second-team AFL All-Time Team; Los Angeles Chargers Hall of Fame; San Diego Chargers 50th Anniversary Team; Second-team All-East (1962)

Career NFL/AFL statistics
- Games played: 181
- Games started: 167
- Fumble recoveries: 2
- Stats at Pro Football Reference

Walter Francis Sweeney (April 18, 1941 – February 2, 2013) was an American professional football player who was a guard in the American Football League (AFL) and the National Football League (NFL). He played college football for the Syracuse Orange and was named to the school's all-century team. He also played in the North–South Bowl and the College All-Star Game. A first-round draft pick of the San Diego Chargers in 1963, Sweeney helped them win the AFL championship.

== Early life ==
Sweeney was born on April 18, 1941, in Cohasset, Massachusetts to Jack and Mary Ann (McCormick) Sweeney. He was the youngest of seven children. Jack Sweeney was killed by a drunk driver when Sweeney was two years old. Sweeney's own alcohol and drug abuse, and battle against addiction, would become a well-known feature of his life.

He attended Cohasset High School, where he was a running back on the football team. The team was undefeated in 1957. In 1958, he was one of the top-scoring offensive players among 120 Boston area high schools. Sweeney was the first Cohasset student to play in the National Football League.

== College ==
Sweeney attended Syracuse University on a football scholarship. He played wide receiver or tight end on the varsity football team from 1960 to 1962, as well as defensive end. His best season as a receiver was as a junior in 1961, catching nine passes for 137 yards and one touchdown. As a senior, he was an All-American football player, on an 8–2 team. He was used mostly as a blocker and defensive end as a senior in 1962. He had lost his scholarship before the 1962 season started because of his involvement in a drunken brawl, but a wealthy alumnus paid his tuition that year.

Sweeney played under College Football Hall of Fame head coach Ben Schwartzwalder, and on the same team as future Pro Football Hall of Fame tight end John Mackey. He also played with future NFL players Jim Nance and Dave Meggyesey. After his final Syracuse game in early December 1962, Sweeney signed a contract with Sid Gillman to play for the San Diego Chargers of the American Football League, on national television, while still on the field after the game. Syracuse upset UCLA in that game 12–7, with Sweeney being named outstanding lineman of the game.

Sweeney played in the North-South game in late December 1962 and the Senior Bowl in early 1963. He also played in the third annual All-American game. He was also selected to play in the College All Star Game. He was named second-team All East, along with Mackey, by the Associated Press in 1962.

In 1999, he was selected as a member of Syracuse’s All-Century Team.

== Professional career ==
The NFL's Cleveland Browns selected Sweeney in the eighth round of the 1963 NFL draft, 107th overall. The San Diego Chargers selected Sweeney in the first round with the second overall draft pick in the 1963 AFL draft. Immediately after Sweeney's final Syracuse game on December 8, 1962, while on national television and still on the playing field, he signed a contract with Sid Gillman to play for the Chargers. Although Sweeney had been used as a blocking end on offense and at defensive end, Gillman planned to make Sweeney a guard when he joined the Chargers.

A premier guard, Sweeney was versatile enough to fill virtually any offensive line position. Sweeney spent 11 seasons as an offensive guard with the Chargers, then played two seasons with the Washington Redskins; his career ending in 1975, after a severe knee injury.

The Chargers won the AFL championship in Sweeney's 1963 rookie season. Sweeney played a number of roles on the 1963 championship team, but did not start any games at guard. His chief contribution was on special teams, as a tackler, playing less than 30 minutes overall during the season at guard.

Sweeney was slotted as a starting guard going into the 1964 season, having put on considerable muscle after working with weights in the off-season. As Sweeney himself later stated, he had also been supplied with steroids by the Chargers. He started all 14 games at guard in 1964, and would start every regular season game for the Chargers from 1964 through 1973. He was named to AFL All-Star teams and NFL Pro Bowls for eight or nine consecutive years at offensive guard, beginning with the 1964 or 1965 AFL All-Star Team.

In 1970, Sweeney was selected to the All-Time All-AFL second-team. In 1965, the Associated Press (AP) selected him second-team All-AFL. In 1967, the AP, Newspaper Enterprise Association (NEA) and United Press International (UPI) selected him first-team All-AFL. In 1968, the AP and NEA again selected him first-team All-AFL, as did The Sporting News; and Pro Football Weekly selected him first-team All-AFL/NFL. In 1969, the NEA and Pro Football Weekly named him first-team All-AFL/NFL and UPI named him first-team All-AFL. In 1970, the first year of the AFL/NFL merger into the National Football League, the NEA selected him first-team All-Pro, and the AP and Pro Football Weekly named him first-team All-AFC. In 1971, the NEA named him a second-team All-Pro, and AP and UPI named him first-team All-AFC.

After starting in 140 straight games for the Chargers from 1964 to 1973, he was traded to the Washington Redskins after the 1973 season for future draft picks. He then started 27 straight games for Washington. Sweeney had knee surgery in 1975 before the season started. His career ended in the last regular season game of the 1975 season with another knee injury, when he was clipped by a Philadelphia Eagles defensive lineman. Sweeney thought there was some irony and justice in his being injured on an illegal maneuver, "'after all the defensive tackles I had held through the years", including pulling on opponents' face masks.

== Drug use and conflict with NFL ==
Sweeney had been a heavy drinker, but stated he was introduced to drug use during his early years with the Chargers, and consistently took drugs to enhance his performance throughout his entire career. Sweeney stated that early in his career Chargers' trainers and team doctors provided him and other players with amphetamines, sedatives, pain killers and steroids as a normal part of game preparation; and that players could even be fined if they did not take the steroids provided by the team. Sweeney described the atmosphere with the Chargers as "'It was like the wild, wild West .... Everything went. There was speed, painkillers, steroids. And if there was a guy around like Terrell Owens at that time, someone would have kicked his ass all over the field.'"

The Chargers had become the first team to hire a weight training specialist, beginning in their 1963 training camp. In Gillman's biography, Sid Gillman Father Of The Passing Game, it states that this new trainer provided the players with a then legal steroid, Dianabol, which they were to take three times a day. Failure to do so resulted in a $50 fine. A group of players, led by future Hall of Fame tackle and attorney Ron Mix, successfully fought the requirement to take the pills. The team still provided Dianabol during the 1963 and 1964 seasons, and even after that the team doctors are alleged to have written Dianabol prescriptions for some players during the 1965 to 1970 time period.

After the NFL began implementing penalties for drug use, Sweeney was among several Chargers fined by the league in 1974 for drug use. Sweeney was fined $1,000, and claimed he had done nothing illegal. A fierce critic of the NFL, he blamed the league for his prolonged problems with drugs and alcohol. Towards the end of his life he retained this bitterness. "'If a guy breaks his back in the N.F.L., they'll pay him. That didn't happen to me. Instead, these guys broke my mind.'" Sweeney ultimately filed a lawsuit against the NFL, alleging that the drugs originally provided by the Charges led to his addiction, resulting in cognitive and personal injuries. The NFL argued it was Sweeney's own choice to use those drugs, and that any injuries he had were the result of playing in NFL games, and that such injuries would be addressed by the league's pension fund. Sweeney was victorious at trial in 1995, winning $1.8 million, but that decision was reversed on appeal in 1997.

He briefly served as a drug counselor at a San Diego hospital and appeared with Nancy Reagan in a promo for her "Just Say No" campaign. Even during this time, however, he continued to take drugs. It was only in the recent years before his death in 2013 that Sweeney was able to get his addiction under control.

== Legacy and honors ==
Sweeney, who stood 6 ft 4 in (1.93 m) and weighed 256 pounds (116.1 kg), was such an aggressive and intimidating presence on the field that Hall of Fame defensive tackle Merlin Olsen famously remarked, "'If I had to play against Sweeney every day I'd rather sell used cars'". Olsen once went into the Chargers’ huddle to tell Sweeney if he grabbed Olsen’s face mask again Olsen would break Sweeney’s neck. In his Los Angeles Times' obituary, it was indicated that Sweeney’s aggressiveness was attributable in part to Sweeney's use of amphetamines in playing games.

Sweeney was inducted into the Chargers Hall of Fame in 1981. The Professional Football Researchers Association named Sweeney to the PRFA Hall of Very Good Class of 2009.

In 2012, Sweeney wrote his autobiography with sports author Bill Swank, entitled Off Guard.

== Personal life ==
Sweeney's life was difficult after retirement, including failed marriages, encounters with the police, job losses, the reversal in his lawsuit, four knee replacements and a hip replacement; all leading to a feeling of hopelessness.

== Death ==
Sweeney died of pancreatic cancer on February 2, 2013, at his home in San Diego, California. He was survived by his children Kristin and Patrick.

== See also ==
- List of American Football League players
