= San Diego Chargers 40th Anniversary Team =

2000 list of personnel of the San Diego Chargers

The San Diego Chargers announced their 40th Anniversary Team in 2000 to honor the top players and coaches in the history of the National Football League team. The Chargers began play in 1960 as part of the American Football League. The anniversary team included 31 players and coaches voted on by fans and a media panel. Four of the players were active on the 2000 Chargers squad. The team became the Los Angeles Chargers after relocating in 2017.

== Key ==
Key
*	Member of Pro Football Hall of Fame
Years	Years with the San Diego Chargers

== Offense ==
Position	Player	Years	Ref
QB	Dan Fouts*	1973–1987	
RB	Keith Lincoln	1961–1966, 1968	
RB	Paul Lowe	1960–1968	
RB	Chuck Muncie	1980–84	
WR	Lance Alworth*	1962–1970	
WR	Wes Chandler	1981–1987	
WR	Charlie Joiner*	1976–1986	
TE	Kellen Winslow*	1979–1987	
T	Ron Mix*	1960–1969	
T	Russ Washington	1968–1982	
G	Ed White	1978–1985	
G	Doug Wilkerson	1971–1984	
C	Don Macek	1976–1989	

== Defense ==
Position	Player	Years	Ref
DE	Fred Dean*	1975–1981	
DE	Leslie O'Neal	1986, 1988–1995	
DT	Gary Johnson	1975–1984	
DT	Louie Kelcher	1975–1983	
LB	Woodrow Lowe	1976–1986	
LB	Junior Seau*	1990–2002	
LB	Billy Ray Smith	1983–1992	
CB	Gill Byrd	1983–1992	
CB	Speedy Duncan	1964–1970	
S	Rodney Harrison	1994–2002	
S	Charlie McNeil	1960–1964	

== Special teams ==
Position	Players	Years	Ref
K	Rolf Benirschke (Note: Wildcard selection. Voters were allowed to select only one kicker, won by Carney, and one extra player at any position as wildcard.)	1977–1986	
K	John Carney	1990–2000	
KR	Lionel James	1984–1988	
P	Darren Bennett	1995–2003	
ST	Hank Bauer	1977–1982	

== Coaches ==
Coach	Years	Ref
Don Coryell*	1978–1986	
Sid Gillman* (Note: Special recognition selection. Voters were allowed to select only one coach, won by Coryell.)	1960–1969, 1971	

== See also ==
- San Diego Chargers 50th Anniversary Team
- Los Angeles Chargers Hall of Fame
