= Charlie McNeil (American football) =

American football player (1936–1994)

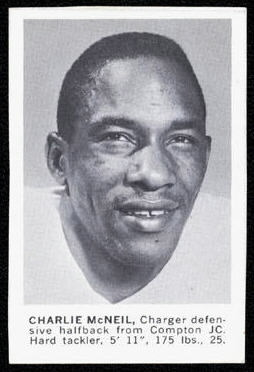
- McNeil c. 1961

No. 27
- Position: Safety

Personal information
- Born: August 7, 1936; Caldwell, Texas, U.S.
- Died: January 7, 1994 (aged 57); Houston, Texas, U.S.
- Listed height: 5 ft 11 in (1.80 m)
- Listed weight: 180 lb (82 kg)

Career information
- High school: Centennial (Compton, California)
- College: Compton
- AFL draft: 1960

Career history
- Los Angeles / San Diego Chargers (1960–1964)

Awards and highlights
- AFL champion (1963); First-team All-AFL (1961); AFL All-Star (1961); San Diego Chargers 50th Anniversary Team; San Diego Chargers 40th Anniversary Team; AFL record: Most interception return yards in a game: 177 (1961)

Career AFL statistics
- Interceptions: 19
- Interception yards: 502
- Defensive touchdowns: 2
- Stats at Pro Football Reference

Charles Edis McNeil (August 7, 1936 – January 7, 1994) was an American professional football safety who played for the Los Angeles / San Diego Chargers of the American Football League (AFL).

He played in four of the first five AFL Championship games (1960, 1961, 1963, and 1964), and was a member of the Chargers 1963 AFL championship team, an All-AFL player in 1961, and an AFL All-Star in 1961. He held the professional football record for 43 years, for the most interception yardage (349) in one season in 1961, and most interception yards (177) in one game, also in 1961. The one-game record still stands. McNeil is the father of professional tennis player Lori McNeil.
