= Keith Lincoln =

American football player (1939–2019)

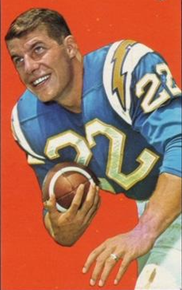

No. 22, 20
- Position: Halfback

Personal information
- Born: May 8, 1939; Reading, Michigan, U.S.
- Died: July 27, 2019 (aged 80); Pullman, Washington, U.S.
- Listed height: 6 ft 1 in (1.85 m)
- Listed weight: 215 lb (98 kg)

Career information
- High school: Monrovia (Monrovia, California)
- College: Washington State (1957–1960)
- NFL draft: 1961: 5th round, 61st overall pick
- AFL draft: 1961: 2nd round, 16th overall pick

Career history
- San Diego Chargers (1961–1966); Buffalo Bills (1967–1968); San Diego Chargers (1968)

Awards and highlights
- AFL champion (1963); AFL Championship Most Valuable Player (1963); 2× First-team All-AFL (1963, 1964); 5× AFL All-Star (1962–1965, 1967); Los Angeles Chargers Hall of Fame; Second-team All-American (1959); First-team All-PCC (1959); Second-team All-PCC (1960); NFL records: Most career rushing yards per attempt in the playoffs: 12.0 (Note: Minimum 20 career playoff rushing attempts)

Career AFL statistics
- Rushing yards: 3,383
- Rushing average: 4.2
- Rushing touchdowns: 19
- Receptions: 165
- Receiving yards: 2,250
- Receiving touchdowns: 19
- Stats at Pro Football Reference

Keith Payson Lincoln (May 8, 1939 – July 27, 2019) was an American professional football player who was a halfback for eight seasons in the American Football League (AFL), primarily with the San Diego Chargers. He played college football for the Washington State Cougars. Lincoln was a two-time All-AFL selection and a five-time AFL All-Star. A member of the Chargers Hall of Fame, he won an AFL championship with the Chargers in 1963, when he was named the most valuable player (MVP) of the championship game. He had a stint with the Buffalo Bills before returning to San Diego and finishing his career.

== Early life ==
Born in Reading, Michigan, on May 8, 1939, Lincoln graduated in 1957 from Monrovia High School in Monrovia, California, in Los Angeles County. He played college football at Washington State University (WSU) in Pullman, Washington. Originally a quarterback on the Cougars' freshman team, he was moved to halfback and was also the team's punter. He was nicknamed the "Moose of the Palouse", given to him by a sportswriter from Spokane.

Lincoln was inducted into the WSU Athletic Hall of Fame in 1979. and the State of Washington Sports Hall of Fame in 1980. In 1995, he was named to Washington State's all-time team by a panel of experts commissioned by The Spokesman-Review to commemorate the 100th anniversary of the school's football program.

== Professional career ==
Lincoln began his career with the San Diego Chargers, who selected him 61st overall in the 1961 AFL draft, choosing them over the Chicago Bears of the more established NFL. As a rookie in 1961, he had a 91-yard reception for a touchdown, the longest catch in the AFL that year. His 86- and 76-yard touchdown runs in 1962 and 1963, respectively, were the league's longest run in those seasons. His 103-yard kickoff return for a touchdown in 1963 was the AFL's longest that year, and is tied for the Chargers team record with Darren Sproles (2008).

In the 1963 AFL championship game, Lincoln was voted the game MVP after the Chargers routed the Boston Patriots 51–10. It remains the only league title in the franchise's history, as well as the city of San Diego's only championship in a major sports league. In the game, Lincoln carried the ball 13 times for 206 yards and had seven catches for 123 yards, compiling an AFL-record 329 yards from scrimmage; he also passed for 20 yards. The record stood for both AFL and NFL players until 1971, when Kansas City Chiefs running back Ed Podolak gained 350 in a double-overtime playoff game against the Miami Dolphins. Lincoln's 206 yards rushing remained an NFL playoff record for 22 years, when Eric Dickerson of the Los Angeles Rams gained 248 against the Dallas Cowboys in 1985.

In the 1964 AFL Championship Game, in a play which came to be known as the "Hit Heard 'Round the World", Lincoln was the recipient of a particularly hard tackle from Buffalo Bills linebacker Mike Stratton which broke one of his ribs and forced him out of the game midway through the first quarter.

Lincoln was traded to the Buffalo Bills in 1967. He was productive that season, but was waived toward the end of the 1968 season before returning to San Diego and playing one game. Over his eight-year career, Lincoln rushed for 3,383 yards and 19 touchdowns and had 165 receptions for 2,250 yards and 19 touchdowns. He was a two-time All-AFL selection (1963, 1964) and a five-time AFL All-Star (1962–1965, 1967), twice being named the game's MVP (1963, 1964). He was inducted into the Chargers Hall of Fame in 1980, and was also named to their 40th and 50th anniversary teams.

== NFL career statistics ==
Legend
	Won the AFL Championship
	Led the league
**Bold**	Career high

Year	Team	Games		Rushing						Receiving					Fumbles	
Year	Team	GP	GS	Att	Yds	Avg	Y/G	Lng	TD	Rec	Yds	Avg	Lng	TD	Fum	FR
1961	SD	**14**	5	41	150	3.7	10.7	17	0	12	208	17.3	**91**	2	0	0
1962	SD	**14**	10	117	574	4.9	41.0	**86**	2	16	214	13.4	29	1	1	0
1963	SD	**14**	**14**	128	**826**	**6.5**	**59.0**	76	5	24	325	13.5	39	3	**5**	0
1964	SD	**14**	13	155	632	4.1	45.1	25	4	34	302	8.9	37	2	1	0
1965	SD	10	7	74	302	4.1	30.2	24	3	23	376	16.3	66	4	0	0
1966	SD	**14**	7	58	214	3.7	15.3	23	1	14	264	**18.9**	67	2	1	0
1967	BUF	**14**	13	**159**	601	3.8	42.9	28	4	**41**	**558**	13.6	60	**5**	3	**2**
1968	BUF	4	0	26	84	3.2	21.0	24	0	1	3	3.0	3	0	1	0
1968	SD	1	0	Did not record any stats												
Career		99	69	758	3,383	4.5	34.2	86	19	165	2,250	13.6	91	19	12	2

== Later life ==
After retiring as a player, Lincoln was a college assistant coach for the Idaho Vandals in 1970 under first-year head coach Don Robbins. He became an assistant coach at his alma mater WSU in 1971 under fourth-year head coach Jim Sweeney, and later became the school's long-time director of alumni relations.

== Personal life ==
Lincoln was married to Bonnie Jo Lincoln (née McKarcher). They had two sons, Lance and Keith (nicknamed "Kip").

Lincoln died at age 80 of congestive heart failure at Pullman Regional Hospital on July 27, 2019.

== See also ==
- List of American Football League players
