= Paul Lowe =

American football player (born 1936)

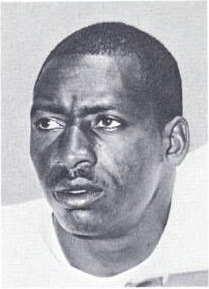
- Lowe, c. 1961

No. 23, 26
- Position: Halfback

Personal information
- Born: September 27, 1936 (age 90); Homer, Louisiana, U.S.
- Listed height: 6 ft 0 in (1.83 m)
- Listed weight: 205 lb (93 kg)

Career information
- High school: Centennial (Compton, California)
- College: Oregon State (1955–1958)
- NFL draft: 1959: undrafted

Career history
- San Francisco 49ers (1959)*; Los Angeles / San Diego Chargers (1960–1968); Kansas City Chiefs (1968–1969)
- * Offseason or practice squad member only

Awards and highlights
- Super Bowl champion (IV); 2× AFL champion (1963, 1969); AFL Most Valuable Player (1965); 2× AFL Comeback Player of the Year (1963, 1965); 2× First-team All-AFL (1960, 1965); 2× Second-team All-AFL (1961, 1963); 2× AFL All-Star (1963, 1965); AFL rushing yards leader (1965); 2× AFL rushing touchdowns leader (1961, 1965); All-Time All-AFL Team; Los Angeles Chargers Hall of Fame; San Diego Chargers 50th Anniversary Team; San Diego Chargers 40th Anniversary Team; Second-team All-PCC (1956)

Career AFL statistics
- Rushing yards: 4,995
- Rushing average: 4.9
- Rushing touchdowns: 38
- Receptions: 111
- Receiving yards: 1,045
- Receiving touchdowns: 7
- Stats at Pro Football Reference

Paul Edward Lowe (born September 27, 1936) is an American former professional football player who was a halfback in the American Football League (AFL), primarily with the Los Angeles / San Diego Chargers. A four-time All-AFL selection and two-time AFL All-Star, he was named to the AFL All-Time Team.

Lowe played college football for the Oregon State Beavers. He won an AFL championship with the Chargers in 1963. He led the league in rushing yards in 1965, when he was named the AFL Player of the Year. Lowe finished his career with the Kansas City Chiefs, receiving a championship ring after they won Super Bowl IV. He was inducted into the Chargers Hall of Fame and named to their 40th and 50th anniversary teams.

== Early life ==
Lowe was born in Homer, Louisiana, and grew up in the Los Angeles area. A native of Compton, California, he jumped the fence of Los Angeles Memorial Coliseum as a child to watch Los Angeles Rams games. He attended Centennial High School, where he was a standout in football, track, and basketball.

== College career ==
Lowe attended Oregon State University and played under Beavers coach Tommy Prothro. In his sophomore year in 1956, he played as the No. 2 tailback behind starter Joe Francis in the Beavers' single-wing offense. Lowe rushed 113 times for 407 yards and six touchdowns, and completed 13 of 26 passes for 293 yards. He received honorable mention for the All-America team from the United Press, who also named him to the second team of the All-Coast team. Oregon State won the Pacific Coast Conference and was ranked 10th nationally. They played in the 1957 Rose Bowl, losing to No. 3 Iowa for the second time in the season.

Shortly after the Rose Bowl, Oregon State suspended Lowe due to low grades. After raising his grades in junior college, he returned to Oregon State the following year in 1958. He failed to meet expectations and was primarily a backup to Grimm Mason and Dainard Paulson, finishing with 62 rushes for 162 yards and two touchdowns along with 100 yards on 6 of 17 passing. After the season, Lowe withdrew from school due to financial and academic difficulties.

== Professional career ==
After leaving Oregon State University, Lowe was undrafted in the 1959 NFL draft. He played for the San Francisco 49ers during the 1959 pre-season before being released in the final cut after hurting his ankle before the regular season began. He returned to Los Angeles, and looked for a job to support his wife and four children. He took a job in the mailroom for the Carte Blanche Corporation, owned by the Hilton family.

In 1960, Barron Hilton, son of famed hotel magnate Conrad Hilton, was the original owner of the Los Angeles Chargers, a start-up team in the newly formed American Football League. Chargers general manager Frank Leahy asked Lowe to come out to training camp based on his performance at Oregon State a few years back. Lowe joined the Chargers as a free agent. He returned his first touch of the football in the AFL for a 105-yard touchdown in the Chargers' first-ever exhibition game. That season, he led the team to a 10–4 record and a Western Division championship. He had a team-high 855 yards rushing on 136 carries for a career-high 6.3 yards per carry average, and also had 23 receptions for 377 yards. Lowe finished No. 2 in the league in rushing, 20 yards behind Abner Haynes of the Dallas Texans, and earned first-team All-AFL honors as a halfback. In the 1960 AFL championship game, Lowe ran for 165 yards.

In the season opener of 1961 against the Texans, with the team now based in San Diego, Lowe had the Chargers' longest run from scrimmage with an 87-yard run, a record that still stands. He missed the 1962 season after breaking his arm. He ran for 1,010 yards in 1963, when the Associated Press named him the AFL Comeback Player of the Year. He played nearly the entire season injured, as he suffered a hairline fracture in his left leg in the season opener. With only head coach Sid Gillman knowing about it, Lowe wrapped a hockey guard around his leg and did not tell the press until the end of the regular season. In the AFL championship game, Lowe rushed for 94 yards on 12 carries, including a 58-yard touchdown, in a 51–10 win over Boston. Limited by a muscle injury in 1964, his production fell to 496 yards.

In 1965, Lowe was named the AFL Player of the Year by The Sporting News after a then-league-record 1,121 yards rushing and six touchdowns (14-game schedule). He became the first AFL player to rush for 1,000 yards twice after gaining 99 yards in a 37–26 win over the Houston Oilers, clinching the Chargers' fifth Western Division title in six years. In the regular season finale against the Oakland Raiders, he broke Clem Daniels' AFL single-season record of 1,099 rushing yards, set by the Raider in 1963. Again named the AFL's comeback player of the year, Lowe was also tied for second with teammate Lance Alworth in voting by United Press International for their AFL player of the year award, won by Jack Kemp.

Lowe rushed for 643 yards the following season in 1966, and his output fell to 71 yards on 2.5 yards per carry in 1967. After running for nine yards on his only carry in the 1968 season-opener win over Cincinnati, he was waived by San Diego. He was 28 yards shy of the 5,000-yard career milestone. Lowe joined the Kansas City Chiefs as a free agent after all six of their running backs were injured. On his first running play with the Chiefs, he separated his shoulder, and missed the rest of the season. In his final season in 1969, he passed 5,000 yards against Boston on September 21 after rushing eight times for 40 yards, surpassing the mark on the final play after a sweep for eight yards. He joined Daniels as the only AFL players to reach the milestone. However, Lowe fell below the mark after losing yards against the Chargers on the final carry of his career. Shortly after, he was hospitalized to treat a bleeding ulcer. Lowe retired and left the team with one game remaining in the regular season. Kansas City defeated Minnesota 23–7 in Super Bowl IV that season, and he received a Super Bowl ring.

== Legacy ==
Lowe was a four-time All-AFL selection, including twice on the first team, as well as a two-time AFL All-Star. He averaged 4.9 yards per carry during his career, which is the highest in Chargers franchise history and tops in the AFL. He set a pro football record with six games gaining 100+ yards on 14 carries or less. Lowe's career rushing total of 4,995 yards are the second-most in AFL history. He led the Chargers in rushing five times, including two 1,000 yard seasons. His 4,972 yards with the Chargers remained a team career record until 2004, when he was surpassed by LaDainian Tomlinson. Lowe was the AFL leader or runner-up in rushing touchdowns four times. He is also one of only twenty players who were in the AFL for its entire ten-year existence.

In 1970, the Pro Football Hall of Fame named Lowe as a running back on the All-Time All-AFL Team. In 1979, the Chargers inducted him into the Chargers Hall of Fame. As of 2006, Lowe was living in San Diego and supports his team as a season ticket holder.

== NFL career statistics ==
Legend
| | AFL MVP |
| | Won the AFL Championship |
| | Super Bowl champion |
| | Led the league |
| **Bold** | Career high |

=== Regular season ===
| Year | Team | Games | | Rushing | | | | | | Receiving | | | | | Fumbles |
| Year | Team | GP | GS | Att | Yds | Avg | Y/G | Lng | TD | Rec | Yds | Avg | Lng | TD | Fum |
|---|---|---|---|---|---|---|---|---|---|---|---|---|---|---|---|
| 1960 | LAC | **14** | 12 | 136 | 855 | 6.3 | 61.1 | 76 | 8 | 23 | **377** | **16.4** | **63** | **2** | 2 |
| 1961 | SD | **14** | **14** | 175 | 767 | 4.4 | 54.8 | **87** | **9** | 17 | 103 | 6.1 | 17 | 0 | 6 |
| 1962 | SD | Missed season due to injury | | | | | | | | | | | | | |
| 1963 | SD | **14** | 12 | 177 | 1,010 | 5.7 | 72.1 | 66 | 8 | **26** | 191 | 7.3 | 31 | **2** | **7** |
| 1964 | SD | 12 | 9 | 130 | 496 | 3.8 | 41.3 | 50 | 3 | 14 | 182 | 13.0 | 41 | **2** | 2 |
| 1965 | SD | **14** | **14** | **222** | **1,121** | 5.0 | **80.1** | 59 | 6 | 17 | 126 | 7.4 | 45 | 1 | 2 |
| 1966 | SD | **14** | 11 | 146 | 643 | 4.4 | 45.9 | 57 | 3 | 12 | 41 | 3.4 | 11 | 0 | 3 |
| 1967 | SD | 7 | 2 | 28 | 71 | 2.5 | 10.1 | 21 | 1 | 2 | 25 | 12.5 | 13 | 0 | 0 |
| 1968 | SD | 1 | 0 | 1 | 9 | **9.0** | 9.0 | 9 | 0 | – | – | – | – | – | 0 |
| 1968 | KC | 1 | 0 | 1 | -10 | -10.0 | -10.0 | -10 | 0 | – | – | – | – | – | 0 |
| 1969 | KC | 7 | 0 | 10 | 33 | 3.3 | 4.7 | 18 | 0 | – | – | – | – | – | 0 |
| Career | | 98 | 74 | 1,026 | 4,995 | 4.9 | 51.0 | 87 | 38 | 111 | 1,045 | 9.4 | 63 | 7 | 23 |

== Health ==
Lowe has experienced ringing in his ears since 1965. In 2017, a neurologist diagnosed that a CT scan "showed atrophy of frontal lobes, and his testing showed...moderate dementia". In 2018, Lowe signed papers that awarded him $25,000 (before lawyer fees) from the NFL concussion settlement.

| Preceded by Gino Cappelletti | American Football League MVP; 1965 with Jack Kemp | Succeeded by Jim Nance |
