= Wes Chandler =

American football player (born 1956)

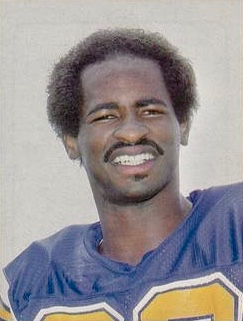
- Chandler with the San Diego Chargers c. 1982

No. 89, 81
- Position: Wide receiver

Personal information
- Born: August 22, 1956 (age 70); New Smyrna Beach, Florida, U.S.
- Listed height: 6 ft 0 in (1.83 m)
- Listed weight: 196 lb (89 kg)

Career information
- High school: New Smyrna Beach
- College: Florida (1974–1977)
- NFL draft: 1978: 1st round, 3rd overall pick

Career history

Playing
- New Orleans Saints (1978–1981); San Diego Chargers (1981–1987); San Francisco 49ers (1988)

Coaching
- Orlando Thunder (1991–1992) Wide receivers coach; UCF (1994–1995) Wide receivers coach; Rhein Fire (1995–1997) Wide receivers coach; Frankfurt Galaxy (1998) Wide receivers coach; Berlin Thunder (1999) Head coach; Dallas Cowboys (2000–2002) Wide receivers coach; Minnesota Vikings (2005) Wide receivers coach; Cleveland Browns (2007–2008) Wide receivers coach; New York Sentinels (2009) Wide receivers coach; California (2012) Wide receivers coach

Awards and highlights
- First-team All-Pro (1982); Second-team All-Pro (1979); 4× Pro Bowl (1979, 1982, 1983, 1985); NFL receiving yards leader (1982); NFL receiving touchdowns leader (1982); Los Angeles Chargers Hall of Fame; San Diego Chargers 50th Anniversary Team; San Diego Chargers 40th Anniversary Team; First-team All-American (1977); Third-team All-American (1976); 2× First-team All-SEC (1976, 1977); Florida–Georgia Hall of Fame; University of Florida Athletic Hall of Fame

Career NFL statistics
- Receptions: 559
- Receiving yards: 8,966
- Receiving touchdowns: 56
- Stats at Pro Football Reference
- College Football Hall of Fame

Wesley Sandy Chandler (born August 22, 1956) is an American former professional football player who was a wide receiver in the National Football League (NFL) for eleven seasons during the 1970s and 1980s. He was selected to the Pro Bowl four times, and ranked twelfth in NFL history in receiving yards and thirteenth in receptions when he retired. Chandler is a member of the Chargers Hall of Fame. He played college football for the Florida Gators and was also inducted into the College Football Hall of Fame in 2015.

Playing as a receiver in a run-oriented wishbone offense at Florida, Chandler set a school record with 28 touchdowns. He was named both an All-American and an Academic All-American in 1977. He was picked third overall by the New Orleans Saints in the 1978 NFL draft. Over an 11-year NFL career, Chandler played for the Saints, the San Diego Chargers and the San Francisco 49ers. He holds the NFL record for most receiving yards per game in a season, set in 1982 with the Chargers. After retiring as a player, he became a football coach, and served as the wide receivers coach for various teams at the professional and college level.

== Early life ==
Chandler was born in New Smyrna Beach, Florida. He attended New Smyrna Beach High School, where he was a standout high school football player for coach Bud Asher's New Smyrna Beach Barracudas. In his junior year the team was undefeated, including a victory over the Rams of Interlachen High School which snapped their 21-game regular season win streak. Chandler scored twenty-two touchdowns as a senior in 1973 (scoring five in a single game), and rushing for 1,052 yards and catching 22 receptions as a wishbone halfback. Prominent with him in the backfield were the brothers Reggie and Keith Beverly. Chandler earned the nickname "Little Joe" due to his small size. In 2007, thirty-three years after he graduated from high school, the Florida High School Athletic Association (FHSAA) recognized Chandler as one of the "100 Greatest Players of the First 100 Years" of Florida high school football.

== College career ==
Chandler accepted an athletic scholarship to attend the University of Florida in Gainesville, Florida, where he was a wide receiver under coach Doug Dickey on the Gators football team from 1974 to 1977. While he was a Florida undergraduate, Chandler became a member of Alpha Phi Alpha fraternity (Theta Sigma chapter). As a Gator, he caught ninety-two passes for 1,963 yards and a school record twenty-two touchdowns in a run-oriented offense, adding six more scores on rushes and kick returns to set the school record for total touchdowns with twenty-eight. He led the Gators in receiving yards for three straight seasons (1975, 1976 and 1977), and despite many seasons of pass-oriented offenses since his time in Gainesville, he still holds Florida's career records in average yards per catch (21.3) and touchdown to reception ratio (one touchdown per 4.18 catches).

Chandler was a first-team All-Southeastern Conference (SEC) selection and a first-team All-American in 1976 and 1977, a first-team Academic All-American in 1977, and the recipient of the Gators' Fergie Ferguson Award as a senior team captain in 1977. He also finished tenth in the balloting for the Heisman Trophy in 1977. He is widely considered to be one of the best all-around football players to ever play for the University of Florida, and has been named to several all-time Gators and all-SEC teams, and was inducted into the University of Florida Athletic Hall of Fame as a "Gator Great" in 1989. In 2006, The Gainesville Sun recognized Chandler as No. 6 among the top 100 Florida Gators players of the first 100 years of the team, and in 2015, Chandler was inducted into the College Football Hall of Fame.

== Professional career ==
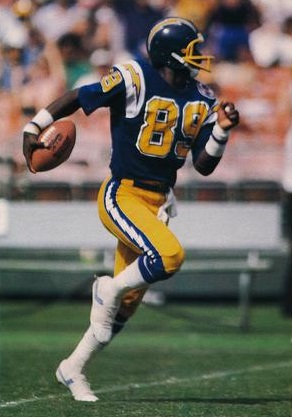
Chandler in 1984

The New Orleans Saints selected Chandler in the first round (third pick overall) in the 1978 NFL Draft, and he played for the Saints for four seasons from 1978 to 1981. Chandler was selected to the Pro Bowl after his second season in the league after finishing with 1,069 yards and six touchdown receptions. He was traded to the San Diego Chargers on September 30, 1981, to replace star receiver John Jefferson, who was traded to the Green Bay Packers after a bitter contract hold-out. In the opening round of the playoffs that year in a game known as The Epic In Miami, he caught six passes for 106 yards and returned a punt 56 yards for a touchdown in the Chargers 41–38 victory.

The following season was Chandler's best, when he led the NFL with 1,032 receiving yards and nine receiving touchdowns in the strike-shortened 1982 season; his average of 129 yards receiving per game that year is still an NFL record. He also caught nine passes for 124 yards in a playoff win over the Pittsburgh Steelers. Chandler represented Chargers players in the players' union, and many NFL players in that role were cut or traded after the 1987 NFL strike. After he was elected to the union's executive committee, Chandler was traded to the San Francisco 49ers, with whom he finished his career in 1988. He played in four games before retiring in October after tendinitis in a knee and frustration over his performance. The 49ers went on to win the Super Bowl that season. "My heart wasn't in it. It had nothing to do with being a quitter. It was more about real-life decisions," he said.

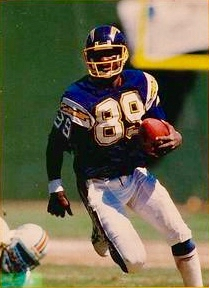
Chandler c. 1987

During his 11-year NFL career, Chandler caught 559 passes for 8,966 yards and 56 touchdowns, rushed for 84 yards, returned 48 kickoffs for 1,048 yards, and gained 428 yards on 77 punt returns. Overall, he amassed 10,526 all-purpose yards. At the time of his retirement, Chandler ranked twelfth in NFL history in receiving yards and thirteenth in receptions. He also earned four Pro Bowl selections, including three with the San Diego Chargers. In 2001, Chandler was inducted into the Chargers Hall of Fame.

== NFL career statistics ==
=== Regular season ===
Year	Team	Games		Receiving				
Year	Team	GP	GS	Rec	Yds	Avg	Lng	TD
1978	NO	16	5	35	472	13.5	58	2
1979	NO	16	16	65	1,069	16.4	85	6
1980	NO	16	16	65	975	15.0	50	6
1981	NO	4	4	17	285	16.8	39	1
1981	SD	12	11	52	857	16.5	51	5
1982	SD	8	8	49	1,032	21.1	66	9
1983	SD	16	14	58	845	14.6	44	5
1984	SD	15	15	52	708	13.6	63	6
1985	SD	15	13	67	1,199	17.9	75	10
1986	SD	16	14	56	874	15.6	40	4
1987	SD	12	11	39	617	15.8	27	2
1988	SF	4	4	4	33	8.3	9	0
Career		150	131	559	8,966	16.0	85	56

== Post-playing career ==
Chandler eventually went to Dallas after seven years coaching in NFL Europe, including a stint as head coach of the Berlin Thunder in 1999. Before that, he also coached at the University of Central Florida in Orlando, Florida and Father Lopez Catholic High School in Daytona Beach, Florida. In January 2012, he joined the California Golden Bears as their receivers coach.

Chandler has established a scholarship fund for minority students through the Wes Chandler Celebrity Golf Classic.

Chandler also has two nephews in athletics. Dallas Baker was a standout wide receiver for the Florida Gators and was drafted by the Pittsburgh Steelers in the 2007 NFL draft. Chandler's other nephew and Dallas's younger brother, Perry Baker, is a professional rugby player with the United States national rugby sevens team.

In 2015, he was one of the founders of the proposed league, Major League Football, and served as its first president. He resigned in July 2017 when the league was reorganizing after failing to launch.

== See also ==
- 1976 College Football All-America Team
- 1977 College Football All-America Team
- List of Alpha Phi Alpha brothers
- List of Florida Gators football All-Americans
- List of Florida Gators in the NFL draft
- List of National Football League season receiving yards leaders
- List of New Orleans Saints first-round draft picks
- List of New Orleans Saints players
