= 1980 All-Pro Team =

Official list of the best NFL players in 1980

The 1980 All-Pro Team is composed of the National Football League players that were named to the Associated Press, Newspaper Enterprise Association, Pro Football Writers Association, Pro Football Weekly, and The Sporting News All-Pro Teams in 1980. Both first- and second- teams are listed for the AP and NEA teams. These are the five teams that are included in Total Football II: The Official Encyclopedia of the National Football League. Pro Football Weekly chose a nose tackle due to the proliferation of 3-4 defenses in the NFL. They, and The Sporting News chose two inside linebackers.

== Teams ==
Offense
Position	First team	Second team
Quarterback	Brian Sipe, Cleveland Browns (AP, NEA, PFWA, PFW, TSN)	Dan Fouts, San Diego Chargers (AP-2)
Running back	Walter Payton, Chicago Bears (AP, NEA, PFWA, PFW, TSN); Earl Campbell, Houston Oilers (AP, NEA, PFWA, PFW, TSN)	Billy Sims, Detroit Lions (AP-2, NEA-2); Ottis Anderson, St. Louis Cardinals (AP-2, NEA-2)
Wide receiver	John Jefferson, San Diego Chargers (AP, NEA, PFWA, PFW, TSN); James Lofton, Green Bay Packers (NEA, PFWA, PFW, TSN); Charlie Joiner, San Diego Chargers (AP)	James Lofton, Green Bay Packers (AP-2); Harold Carmichael, Philadelphia Eagles (NEA-2); Stanley Morgan, New England Patriots (AP-2, NEA-2)
Tight end	Kellen Winslow, San Diego Chargers (AP, NEA, PFWA, PFW, TSN)	Junior Miller, Atlanta Falcons (AP-2); Ozzie Newsome, Cleveland Browns (NEA-2)
Tackle	Leon Gray, Houston Oilers (AP, PFWA, PFW, TSN); Mike Kenn, Atlanta Falcons (AP, NEA, PFWA, PFW, TSN); Dan Dierdorf, St. Louis Cardinals (NEA)	Dan Dierdorf, St. Louis Cardinals (AP-2); Leon Gray, Houston Oilers (NEA-2); Marvin Powell, New York Jets (AP-2, NEA-2)
Guard	John Hannah, New England Patriots (AP, NEA, PFWA, PFW, TSN); Joe DeLamielleure, Cleveland Browns (PFWA, TSN); Herbert Scott, Dallas Cowboys (AP, NEA); Kent Hill, Los Angeles Rams (PFW)	Doug Wilkerson, San Diego Chargers (NEA-2); Randy Cross, San Francisco 49ers, (NEA-2t); Dave Scott, Atlanta Falcons (NEA-2t); Joe DeLamielleure, Cleveland Browns (AP-2); Kent Hill, Los Angeles Rams (AP-2)
Center	Mike Webster, Pittsburgh Steelers (AP, NEA, PFWA, PFW, TSN)	Rich Saul, Los Angeles Rams (AP-2, NEA-2)

Special teams
Position	First team	Second team
Kicker	Eddie Murray, Detroit Lions, (AP, NEA, PFWA); Fred Steinfort, Denver Broncos (PFW-t, TSN); John Smith, New England Patriots (PFW-t)	Rolf Benirschke, San Diego Chargers (AP-2); Fred Steinfort, Denver Broncos (NEA-2)
Punter	Dave Jennings, New York Giants (AP, NEA, PFWA, PFW, TSN)	Ray Guy, Oakland Raiders (AP-2, NEA-2)
Kick Returner	Horace Ivory, New England Patriots (PFWA, PFW, TSN); J. T. Smith, Kansas City Chiefs (AP)	Mike Nelms, Washington Redskins (AP-2)
Punt Returner	J. T. Smith, Kansas City Chiefs (PFWA, PFW, TSN)	

Defense
Position	First team	Second team
Defensive end	Art Still, Kansas City Chiefs (NEA, PFWA, PFW, TSN); Lee Roy Selmon, Tampa Bay Buccaneers (NEA, PFWA, TSN); Lyle Alzado, Cleveland Browns (AP); Fred Dean, San Diego Chargers (AP, PFW)	Jack Youngblood, Los Angeles Rams (NEA-2); Dan Hampton, Chicago Bears (NEA-2); Lee Roy Selmon, Tampa Bay Buccaneers (AP-2); Art Still, Kansas City Chiefs (AP-2)
Defensive tackle	Gary Johnson, San Diego Chargers (AP, NEA, PFWA, PFW, TSN); Randy White, Dallas Cowboys (NEA, PFWA, PFW, TSN); Charlie Johnson, Philadelphia Eagles (AP); Fred Smerlas, Buffalo Bills (PFW-NT)	Louie Kelcher, San Diego Chargers (AP-2); Randy White, Dallas Cowboys (AP-2); Charlie Johnson, Philadelphia Eagles (NEA-2); Fred Smerlas, Buffalo Bills (NEA-2)
Middle linebacker	Jack Lambert, Pittsburgh Steelers (AP, NEA, PFWA, PFW); Steve Nelson, New England Patriots (PFW, TSN-t); Randy Gradishar, Denver Broncos (TSN-t)	Bob Breunig, Dallas Cowboys (AP-2); Randy Gradishar, Denver Broncos (NEA-2)
Outside linebacker	Matt Blair, Minnesota Vikings (AP); Robert Brazile, Houston Oilers (NEA, PFWA, TSN); Ted Hendricks, Oakland Raiders (AP, NEA, PFWA, PFW); Jerry Robinson, Philadelphia Eagles (PFW)	Jack Ham, Pittsburgh Steelers (NEA-2); Robert Brazile, Houston Oilers (AP-2); Matt Blair, Minnesota Vikings (NEA-2); Jerry Robinson, Philadelphia Eagles (AP-2)
Cornerback	Lester Hayes, Oakland Raiders (AP, NEA, PFWA, PFW, TSN); Lemar Parrish, Washington Redskins (NEA, PFWA, PFW, TSN); Pat Thomas, Los Angeles Rams (AP)	Mike Haynes, New England Patriots (AP-2, NEA-2); Lemar Parrish, Washington Redskins (AP-2); Pat Thomas, Los Angeles Rams (NEA-2)
Safety	Nolan Cromwell, Los Angeles Rams (AP, NEA, PFWA-FS, PFW, TSN); Donnie Shell, Pittsburgh Steelers (AP, NEA, PFWA-SS, TSN); Gary Fencik, Chicago Bears (PFW)	Gary Barbaro, Kansas City Chiefs (AP-2, NEA-2); Randy Logan, Philadelphia Eagles (AP-2, NEA-2)

== Key ==
- AP = Associated Press first-team All-Pro
- AP-2 = Associated Press second-team All-Pro
- NEA = Newspaper Enterprise Association first-team All-Pro team
- NEA-2 = Newspaper Enterprise Association second-team All-Pro team
- PFW = Pro Football Weekly All-Pro team
- PFWA = Pro Football Writers Association All-NFL
- TSN = The Sporting News All-Pro
