= 1979 All-Pro Team =

Official list of the best NFL players in 1979

The 1979 All-Pro Team is composed of the National Football League players that were named to the Associated Press, Newspaper Enterprise Association, Pro Football Writers Association, and Pro Football Weekly All-Pro Teams in 1979. Both first- and second- teams are listed for the AP and NEA teams. These are the four All-Pro teams that were included in the Total Football II: The Official Encyclopedia of the National Football League and compose the Consensus All-pro team for 1979.

== Teams ==
Offense
Position	First team	Second team
Quarterback	Dan Fouts, San Diego Chargers (AP, NEA, PFWA, PFW)	Brian Sipe, Cleveland Browns (AP-2); Terry Bradshaw, Pittsburgh Steelers (NEA-2)
Running back	Ottis Anderson, St. Louis Cardinals (AP, PFWA); Earl Campbell, Houston Oilers (AP, NEA, PFWA, PFW); Walter Payton, Chicago Bears (NEA, PFW)	Wilbert Montgomery, Philadelphia Eagles (AP-2); Franco Harris, Pittsburgh Steelers (NEA-2); Walter Payton, Chicago Bears (AP-2); Ottis Anderson, St. Louis Cardinals (NEA-2)
Wide receiver	John Jefferson, San Diego Chargers (AP, NEA, PFWA, PFW); John Stallworth, Pittsburgh Steelers (AP, NEA, PFWA, PFW)	Steve Largent, Seattle Seahawks (AP-2); Harold Carmichael, Philadelphia Eagles (AP-2); Ahmad Rashad, Minnesota Vikings (NEA-2); Wes Chandler, New Orleans Saints (NEA-2)
Tight end	Dave Casper, Oakland Raiders (AP, PFW); Ozzie Newsome, Cleveland Browns (PFWA); Raymond Chester, Oakland Raiders (NEA)	Dave Casper, Oakland Raiders (NEA-2); Ozzie Newsome, Cleveland Browns (AP-2)
Tackle	Marvin Powell, New York Jets (AP, PFWA, PFW); Leon Gray, Houston Oilers (AP, NEA, PFWA, PFW); Jon Kolb, Pittsburgh Steelers (NEA)	Russ Washington, San Diego Chargers (AP-2, NEA-2); Stan Walters, Philadelphia Eagles (AP-2); Marvin Powell, New York Jets (NEA-2)
Guard	John Hannah, New England Patriots (AP, NEA, PFWA, PFW); Joe DeLamielleure, Buffalo Bills (NEA, PFWA); Bob Young, St. Louis Cardinals (AP, PFW)	Joe DeLamielleure, Buffalo Bills (AP-2); Doug Wilkerson, San Diego Chargers (NEA-2); Gerry Mullins, Pittsburgh Steelers (NEA-2); Ed White, San Diego Chargers (AP-2)
Center	Mike Webster, Pittsburgh Steelers (AP, NEA, PFWA, PFW)	Jeff Van Note, Atlanta Falcons (AP-2); Jack Rudnay, Kansas City Chiefs (NEA-2)

Special teams
Position	First team	Second team
Kicker	Toni Fritsch, Houston Oilers (AP, NEA, PFWA); Mark Moseley, Washington Redskins (PFW)	Mark Moseley, Washington Redskins (AP-2, NEA-2)
Punter	Bob Grupp, Kansas City Chiefs (NEA, PFWA, PFW); Dave Jennings, New York Giants (AP)	Ray Guy, Oakland Raiders (NEA-2); Bob Grupp, Kansas City Chiefs (AP-2)
Kick Returner	Rick Upchurch, Denver Broncos (PFW); Tony Nathan, Miami Dolphins (AP)	Rick Upchurch, Denver Broncos (AP-2)
Punt Returner	Ira Matthews, Oakland Raiders (PFW)	

Defense
Position	First team	Second team
Defensive end	Jack Youngblood, Los Angeles Rams (AP, NEA, PFWA, PFW); Lee Roy Selmon, Los Angeles Rams (AP, NEA, PFWA, PFW)	Elvin Bethea, Houston Oilers (AP-2); Harvey Martin, Dallas Cowboys (AP-2, NEA-2); Bubba Baker, Detroit Lions (NEA-2)
Defensive tackle	Randy White, Dallas Cowboys (AP, NEA, PFWA, PFW); Joe Greene, Pittsburgh Steelers (PFWA, PFW); Larry Brooks, Los Angeles Rams (AP); Charlie Johnson, Philadelphia Eagles (NEA)	Curley Culp, Houston Oilers (AP-2); Bob Baumhower, Miami Dolphins (AP-2); Gary Johnson, San Diego Chargers (NEA-2); Joe Greene, Pittsburgh Steelers (NEA-2)
Middle linebacker	Jack Lambert, Pittsburgh Steelers (AP, NEA, PFW); Randy Gradishar, Denver Broncos (PFWA, PFW)	Randy Gradishar, Denver Broncos (AP-2, NEA-2)
Outside linebacker	Robert Brazile, Houston Oilers (AP, NEA, PFWA, PFW); Jack Ham, Pittsburgh Steelers (AP, NEA, PFWA, PFW)	Dewey Selmon, Tampa Bay Buccaneers (AP-2); Jim Youngblood, Los Angeles Rams (AP-2); Dave Lewis, Tampa Bay Buccaneers (NEA-2); Tom Jackson, Denver Broncos (NEA-2)
Cornerback	Louis Wright, Denver Broncos (AP, NEA, PFWA, PFW); Lemar Parrish, Washington Redskins (AP, NEA, PFWA, PFW)	Mike Haynes, New England Patriots (AP-2, NEA-2); Mel Blount, Pittsburgh Steelers (AP-2, NEA-2)
Safety	Mike Reinfeldt, Houston Oilers (AP, NEA, PFWA-FS, PFW); Donnie Shell, Pittsburgh Steelers (AP, NEA); Gary Fencik, Chicago Bears (PFWA-SS); Tommy Myers, New Orleans Saints (PFW)	Thom Darden, Cleveland Browns (AP-2); Ken Houston, Washington Redskins (AP-2); Billy Thompson, Denver Broncos (NEA-2); Tim Foley, Miami Dolphins (NEA-2)

== Key ==
- AP = Associated Press first-team All-Pro
- AP-2 = Associated Press second-team All-Pro
- NEA = Newspaper Enterprise Association first-team All-Pro team
- NEA-2 = Newspaper Enterprise Association second-team All-Pro team
- PFW = Pro Football Weekly All-Pro team
- PFWA = Pro Football Writers Association All-NFL
