= Gill Byrd =

American football player and coach (born 1961)

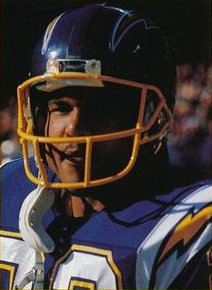
- Byrd c. 1987

No. 22
- Position: Cornerback

Personal information
- Born: February 20, 1961 (age 65); San Francisco, California, U.S.
- Listed height: 5 ft 11 in (1.80 m)
- Listed weight: 195 lb (88 kg)

Career information
- High school: Lowell (San Francisco)
- College: San Jose State (1979–1982)
- NFL draft: 1983: 1st round, 22nd overall pick

Career history

Playing
- San Diego Chargers (1983–1993)

Coaching
- St. Louis Rams (2003–2004) Defensive assistant; St. Louis Rams (2005) Assistant secondary coach; Chicago Bears (2006) Defensive quality control coach; Chicago Bears (2007–2012) Assistant defensive backs coach; Tampa Bay Buccaneers (2014–2015) Cornerbacks coach; Buffalo Bills (2017) Defensive backs coach; Illinois (2018–2019) Safeties coach

Awards and highlights
- Second-team All-Pro (1992); 2× Pro Bowl (1991, 1992); Los Angeles Chargers Hall of Fame; San Diego Chargers 50th Anniversary Team; San Diego Chargers 40th Anniversary Team

Career NFL statistics
- Interceptions: 42
- Interception yards: 546
- Fumble recoveries: 4
- Defensive touchdowns: 2
- Stats at Pro Football Reference

Gill Arnette Byrd (born February 20, 1961) is an American former professional football player who was a cornerback for the San Diego Chargers of the National Football League (NFL). He was a twice Pro Bowl selection in 1991 and 1992 for the Chargers after graduating from San Jose State University. Byrd received the Bart Starr Award in 1993 and was inducted into the Chargers Hall of Fame in 1998.

== Early life ==
He was an All-City running back and defensive back at Lowell High School, helping to lead the Cardinals to the city championship in his senior season of 1978.

== Coaching career ==
Byrd began his coaching career in 2003 as a volunteer with the St. Louis Rams. He was promoted to assistant secondary coach in 2005. On February 20, 2006, Byrd was hired by the Chicago Bears. In 2007, he served as the assistant defensive backs coach after holding the position of defensive quality control coach in his first year with the team. Byrd was promoted to assistant defensive backs/safeties coach on January 16, 2008. Byrd was fired on January 19, 2013. He became the Tampa Bay Buccaneers cornerbacks coach in 2014. He was fired following the 2015 NFL season. On February 7, 2017, the Buffalo Bills hired Byrd to oversee the team's defensive backs. He left the job in January and coached the defensive backs at the University of Illinois.

== Personal life ==
His sons, Gill Byrd Jr. and Jairus Byrd, played college football at New Mexico State University and the University of Oregon, respectively. Jairus was selected by the Buffalo Bills with the 42nd pick in the 2009 NFL draft as a cornerback, but was moved to the free safety position, at which he made the Pro Bowl in 2009, 2012, and 2013. His nephew is Richard Rodgers, a former tight end for the Green Bay Packers.
