= Darren Bennett (football player) =

Australian rules footballer and American football player (born 1965)

Personal information
- Full name: Darren Leslie Bennett
- Born: 9 January 1965 (age 61) Sydney, Australia
Australian rules football career
Personal information
- Original team: East Fremantle
- Draft: No. 13, 1988 national draft
- Debut: Round 1, 29 March 1987, West Coast vs. Richmond, at Subiaco Oval
- Height: 196 cm (6 ft 5 in)
- Weight: 106 kg (234 lb)
- Position: Forward
Playing career^{1}
Years	Club	Games (Goals)
1982–1987	East Fremantle	24 (87)
1987	West Coast	4 (7)
1989–1993	Melbourne	74 (208)
Total		102 (302)
- ^{1} Playing statistics correct to the end of 1993.
Career highlights
- 2× Melbourne leading goalkicker (1989, 1990)

Sport
- Football career

No. 2
- Position: Punter

Personal information
- Listed height: 6 ft 5 in (1.96 m)
- Listed weight: 235 lb (107 kg)

Career information
- High school: Applecross (Ardross, Western Australia)
- College: None
- NFL draft: 1993: undrafted

Career history
- San Diego Chargers (1994–2003); Amsterdam Admirals (1995); Minnesota Vikings (2004–2005)

Awards and highlights
- First-team All-Pro (1995); 2× Pro Bowl (1995, 2000); NFL 1990s All-Decade Team; San Diego Chargers Hall of Fame; San Diego Chargers 50th Anniversary Team; San Diego Chargers 40th Anniversary Team

Career NFL statistics
- Punts: 836
- Punting yards: 36,316
- Punting average: 43.4
- Longest punt: 66
- Inside 20: 262
- Stats at Pro Football Reference

Darren Leslie Bennett (born 9 January 1965) is an Australian former professional player of Australian rules football and American football. He played in the United States as a punter in the National Football League (NFL).

As an Australian rules footballer, he played for East Fremantle in the West Australian Football League (WAFL) between 1982 and 1987 and then in the Australian Football League (AFL) for the West Coast Eagles and the Melbourne Football Club. He was most successful at Melbourne, where he was named as one of the club's 150 Heroes of the last 150 years, kicking 208 goals from just 74 games for the club.

As an American football player, following a three-club career in the National Football League he is regarded as one of the greatest players of the 1990s and a member of the NFL 1990s All-Decade Team.

This combination made him notable as arguably the most successful of the Australian sportsmen linked to professional American football in history.

== Australian rules football career ==
Born in Sydney, Bennett grew up in Perth, Western Australia, where he began playing Australian rules football, first playing senior football with East Fremantle in the West Australian Football League. His career with the Sharks was severely affected by injuries to his knee, which kept him out for over a season during 1985 and 1986 – in the interim denying him a WAFL premiership. However, training with former star Harry Neesham allowed Bennett to be fit for the 1986 finals, and in the second semi he became the first player ever to score ten goals in a WA(N)FL final.

As a consequence of his devastating late-1986 form, which included eleven goals in the last round against Claremont as well as his second semi effort, Bennett was recruited to be a member of the West Coast Eagles' inaugural squad in 1987. A serious knee injury curtailed his career with the Eagles after four games. Released by the Eagles, at the end of the 1988 season, he was drafted by the Melbourne Demons with the 13th selection in the 1988 VFL Draft. In both 1989 (34 goals) and 1990 (87 goals) Bennett led the Demons' goalkicking.

Bennett was known for kicking long goals, torpedo punts and taking strong marks.

Bennett was regarded as one of Melbourne's finest players in the early 1990s. But injuries caught up with him, and he played just two games in 1993. After the season, Bennett quietly retired from the Australian Football League, having totalled 78 games and 215 goals.

Most pre- or early 1990s Australian rules players had other jobs besides playing football; Bennett worked as a youth counsellor, and until being drafted by Melbourne planned to work on a shrimp boat. He participated in an exhibition match at SkyDome in Toronto in 1989; it is believed that Bennett was first exposed to American football during that trip.

== Statistics ==
Legend
G	Goals	K	Kicks	D	Disposals	T	Tackles
B	Behinds	H	Handballs	M	Marks

Season	Team	No.	Games	Totals							Averages (per game)						
Season	Team	No.	Games	G	B	K	H	D	M	T	G	B	K	H	D	M	T
1987	West Coast	19	4	7	5	24	0	24	17	1	1.8	1.3	6.0	0.0	6.0	4.3	0.3
1988	West Coast	19	0	—	—	—	—	—	—	—	—	—	—	—	—	—	—
1989	Melbourne	19	13	34	30	90	27	117	69	6	2.6	2.3	6.9	2.1	9.0	5.3	0.5
1990	Melbourne	19	23	87	54	201	31	232	135	8	3.8	2.3	8.7	1.3	10.1	5.9	0.3
1991	Melbourne	19	22	55	37	177	46	223	132	2	2.5	1.7	8.0	2.1	10.1	6.0	0.1
1992	Melbourne	19	14	28	23	76	13	89	54	7	2.0	1.6	5.4	0.9	6.4	3.9	0.5
1993	Melbourne	19	2	4	3	12	2	14	8	0	2.0	1.5	6.0	1.0	7.0	4.0	0.0
Career			78	215	152	580	119	699	415	24	2.8	1.9	7.4	1.5	9.0	5.3	0.3

== NFL career ==
Bennett married in 1993. Having won airplane tickets to the US he and his wife went on their honeymoon to California in November 1993, where Bennett asked Chris Jones, his fitness coach at Melbourne to contact the coaching staff of the San Diego Chargers and asked for a tryout. While the coaches laughed at Bennett when the first snap hit him in the face, they liked his kicks and invited him to the 1994 minicamp. Bennett kicked during the 1994 preseason then spent the season with the Chargers' practice squad.

During the spring of 1995, the Chargers sent him to the Amsterdam Admirals of NFL Europe, where he led the league in net punting average and earned all-league honours. That fall, he became the Chargers' regular punter. In his rookie season, he finished second in the NFL in punting average and made the AFC Pro Bowl team. He went on to establish himself as arguably the best punter in the NFL for the rest of the 1990s. Despite playing in the league for only half of that decade, he was named as the punter on the NFL's All-Decade Team for the 1990s.

Bennett's initial 1995 contract with the Chargers was, while the NFL rookie minimum of $119,000 plus a $30,000 Pro Bowl bonus, much more than the salaries of Australian rules players. On 7 August 1999, Bennett returned home with his adoptive sport and took part in Australia's first American Bowl in Sydney's brand new Stadium Australia against the Denver Broncos.

Bennett was named to another Pro Bowl team in 2000, and continued to be one of the league's leading punters well into the 21st century. Going into the 2004 season, he had averaged 43.8 yards per punt, averaged 27 punts per season inside the 20-yard-line, and had only three blocked punts in his career (two of which happened when the Chargers had only 10 men on the field). As a former Aussie rules player, and considerably larger than most specialist kickers in American football (6 feet 5 inches or 1.96 metres and 235 pounds or 106.6 kilograms), he did not shy away from physical contact on special teams. This willingness to hit, rare among kickers, was never more evident than when he knocked an opposing punt returner out cold in his rookie season. In 2004, after 144 games for the Chargers, he signed as a free agent with the Minnesota Vikings, where he spent one season until being injured in pre-season and then cut in September 2005. However, he was recalled by the team in December 2005, after starting punter Chris Kluwe (who had replaced him on the Vikings squad) was injured; Bennett was signed to a temporary contract. He played one game before being released by the Vikings, having made his final NFL appearance after 15 Vikings games and a total of 159 NFL games.

Bennett is also credited for the introduction into the NFL of the "Aussie Rules kick" or "drop punt" as it is known in Australia. The technique was instrumental in the advancement of Australians into the NFL, and is a widely accepted punt now in all levels of football from NFL, NCAA and high schools around the country.

Bennett was named to the San Diego Chargers 50th Anniversary Team in 2009. He was inducted into the Chargers Hall of Fame in 2012, the first time the Chargers allowed fans to decide the newest member.

== Personal life ==
Bennett and his wife Rosemary reside in Tulsa, Oklahoma, and became US citizens in 2010. One of their sons, Thomas, followed Bennett into punting, and played college football at Baylor and Tulsa. Their other son, William, died in August 2020 at the age of 25 from Duchenne muscular dystrophy; Bennett is deeply involved with charities associated with that disease.

Bennett coaches high school kickers and punters in San Diego and Tulsa and mentors high school, NCAA and NFL players. Through a partnership with Puntfactory Australia, he mentors Australian punters playing NCAA football in the United States.

Bennett and fellow former punter Sav Rocca established a camp to help aspiring Australia punters.
