= Leslie O'Neal =

American football player (born 1964)

No. 91
- Positions: Defensive end, linebacker

Personal information
- Born: May 7, 1964 (age 62); Little Rock, Arkansas, U.S.
- Listed height: 6 ft 4 in (1.93 m)
- Listed weight: 275 lb (125 kg)

Career information
- High school: Hall (Little Rock)
- College: Oklahoma State (1982–1985)
- NFL draft: 1986: 1st round, 8th overall pick

Career history
- San Diego Chargers (1986–1995); St. Louis Rams (1996–1997); Kansas City Chiefs (1998–1999)

Awards and highlights
- NFL Defensive Rookie of the Year (1986); 3× Second-team All-Pro (1990, 1992, 1994); 6× Pro Bowl (1989, 1990, 1992–1995); PFWA All-Rookie Team (1986); Los Angeles Chargers Hall of Fame; San Diego Chargers 50th Anniversary Team; San Diego Chargers 40th Anniversary Team; Unanimous All-American (1985); First-team All-American (1984); Big Eight Defensive Player of the Year (1984); 3× First-team All-Big Eight (1983, 1984, 1985); NFL record: Most sacks in a game by a rookie: 5 (1986)

Career NFL statistics
- Sacks: 132.5
- Tackles: 767
- Forced fumbles: 21
- Fumble recoveries: 16
- Interceptions: 3
- Defensive touchdowns: 2
- Stats at Pro Football Reference
- College Football Hall of Fame

Leslie Claudis O'Neal (born May 7, 1964) is an American former professional football player who was a defensive end and linebacker for 13 years in the National Football League (NFL). He spent the majority of his career with the San Diego Chargers before finishing with the St. Louis Rams and the Kansas City Chiefs. He was a three-time All-Pro and six-time Pro Bowl selection during his pro career.

O'Neal was a two-time All-American playing college football for the Oklahoma State Cowboys. He joined the Chargers after they selected him in the first round with the eighth overall pick in the 1986 NFL draft. He was named NFL Defensive Rookie of the Year, but suffered a major knee injury at the end of his first season. He returned within two years, and finished his career as the Chargers all-time leader in sacks.

== College career ==
O'Neal played college football for the Oklahoma State Cowboys, and twice earned All-American honors. He was a Big Eight Defensive Player of the Year, and earned All-Big Eight honors for three consecutive years. He finished his Cowboys career ranked fifth all-time in tackles with 351.

On March 11, 2020, O’Neal was elected to the College Football Hall of Fame as a player. He is Oklahoma State's sixth member of the Hall of Fame.

== Professional career ==
O'Neal was chosen in the first round with the eighth overall pick in the 1986 NFL draft by the San Diego Chargers. He was named the NFL Defensive Rookie of the Year in 1986 after recording 12 1/2 sacks for the season, including a team-record five on November 16 against the Dallas Cowboys. However, his season ended prematurely due to a knee injury that sidelined him for almost two seasons.

He returned during the 1988 season on October 16, and returned to his dominant form the following season, when he again had 12 1/2 sacks, and was rewarded with the first of six Pro Bowl selections. O'Neal led the Chargers in sacks every season from 1990 through 1995, earning three second-team All-Pro selections in that span. In 1992, he led the American Football Conference (AFC) with a career-high 17 sacks. He played his final four seasons with the St. Louis Rams and Kansas City Chiefs.

He finished his Chargers career as the team's all-time leader in sacks (105 1/2). He was named to the Chargers 40th and 50th anniversary teams, and was inducted to the Chargers Hall of Fame as well as the Oklahoma Sports Hall of Fame in 2014. Through the 2013 season, he ranked 10th all-time in the NFL in sacks with (132 1/2), tied with Lawrence Taylor when excluding the 9.5 sacks the latter accumulated in his rookie season due to not being an official statistic that time.

== NFL career statistics ==
Legend
**Bold**	Career high

=== Regular season ===
Year	Team	Games		Tackles				Interceptions			Fumbles	
Year	Team	GP	GS	Cmb	Solo	Ast	Sck	Int	Yds	TD	FF	FR
1986	SD	13	13	82	–	–	12.5	**2**	**22**	**1**	3	2
1987	SD	Missed season due to injury										
1988	SD	9	1	28	–	–	4.0	0	0	0	1	0
1989	SD	16	16	**96**	–	–	12.5	0	0	0	2	2
1990	SD	16	16	81	–	–	13.5	0	0	0	2	2
1991	SD	16	16	68	–	–	9.0	0	0	0	2	0
1992	SD	15	15	78	–	–	**17.0**	0	0	0	0	1
1993	SD	16	16	56	–	–	12.0	0	0	0	2	1
1994	SD	16	16	60	**47**	13	12.5	0	0	0	2	1
1995	SD	16	16	48	36	12	12.5	0	0	0	**4**	0
1996	STL	16	16	54	39	**15**	7.0	0	0	0	0	**3**
1997	STL	15	14	43	35	8	10.0	1	5	0	1	2
1998	KC	16	13	45	32	13	4.5	0	0	0	2	2
1999	KC	16	10	28	22	6	5.5	0	0	0	0	0
Career		196	178	767	211	67	132.5	3	27	1	21	16

== See also ==
- List of National Football League career sacks leaders
