= 1982 All-Pro Team =

Official list of the best NFL players in 1982

The 1982 All-Pro Team is composed of the National Football League (NFL) players that were named to the Associated Press, Newspaper Enterprise Association, Pro Football Writers Association, and Pro Football Weekly in 1982. Both first- and second- teams are listed for the AP and NEA teams. These are the four teams that are included in Total Football II: The Official Encyclopedia of the National Football League. The Sporting News did not choose a 1982 All-Pro team due to the players' strike.

== Teams ==
Offense
Position	First team	Second team
Quarterback	Dan Fouts, San Diego Chargers (AP, NEA, PFWA, PFW)	Danny White, Dallas Cowboys (AP-2); Joe Theismann, Washington Redskins (NEA-2)
Running back	Marcus Allen, Los Angeles Raiders (AP, NEA, PFWA, PFW); Freeman McNeil, New York Jets (AP, NEA, PFWA, PFW)	Tony Dorsett, Dallas Cowboys (AP-2, NEA-2); William Andrews, Atlanta Falcons (AP-2, NEA-2)
Wide receiver	Dwight Clark, San Francisco 49ers (AP, NEA, PFWA, PFW); Wes Chandler, San Diego Chargers (AP, NEA, PFWA, PFW)	Cris Collinsworth, Cincinnati Bengals (AP-2); James Lofton, Green Bay Packers (AP-2, NEA-2); Charlie Brown, Washington Redskins (NEA-2)
Tight end	Kellen Winslow, San Diego Chargers (AP, NEA, PFWA, PFW)	Ozzie Newsome, Cleveland Browns (NEA-2); Dan Ross, Cincinnati Bengals (AP-2)
Tackle	Marvin Powell, New York Jets (AP, NEA, PFWA, PFW); Anthony Muñoz, Cincinnati Bengals (AP, NEA, PFWA, PFW)	Mike Kenn, Atlanta Falcons (AP-2, NEA-2); Russ Washington, San Diego Chargers (AP-2); Greg Koch, Green Bay Packers (NEA-2)
Guard	Doug Wilkerson, San Diego Chargers (AP, NEA, PFWA, PFW); John Hannah, New England Patriots (PFWA, PFW); R.C. Thielemann, Atlanta Falcons (AP); Ed Newman, Miami Dolphins (NEA)	Kurt Petersen, Dallas Cowboys (NEA-2); Ed Newman, Miami Dolphins (AP-2); John Hannah, New England Patriots (AP-2, NEA-2)
Center	Joe Fields, New York Jets (AP, NEA); Mike Webster, Pittsburgh Steelers (PFWA, PFW)	Jeff Van Note, Atlanta Falcons(AP-2); Mike Webster, Pittsburgh Steelers (NEA-2)

Special teams
Position	First team	Second team
Kicker	Mark Moseley, Washington Redskins (AP, NEA, PFWA, PFW)	Uwe von Schamann, Miami Dolphins (AP-2); Eddie Murray, Detroit Lions (NEA-2)
Punter	Dave Jennings, New York Giants (NEA, PFWA, PFW); Luke Prestridge, Denver Broncos (AP)	Dave Jennings, New York Giants (AP-2)
Kick Returner	Rick Upchurch, Denver Broncos (AP); Mike Nelms, Washington Redskins (PFWA)	Mike Nelms, Washington Redskins (AP-2)
Punt Returner	Rick Upchurch, Denver Broncos (PFW); LeRoy Irvin, Los Angeles Rams (PFWA)	

Defense
Position	First team	Second team
Defensive end	Mark Gastineau, New York Jets (AP, NEA, PFWA, PFW); Lee Roy Selmon, Tampa Bay Buccaneers (NEA, PFWA); Ed Jones, Dallas Cowboys (AP); Doug Martin, Minnesota Vikings (PFW)	Ben Williams, Buffalo Bills (NEA-2); Harvey Martin, Dallas Cowboys (AP-2); Ed Jones, Dallas Cowboys (NEA-2); Lee Roy Selmon, Tampa Bay Buccaneers (AP-2)
Defensive tackle	Randy White, Dallas Cowboys (AP, NEA, PFWA, PFW); Dan Hampton, Chicago Bears (NEA, PFWA, PFW); Doug English, Detroit Lions (AP); Fred Smerlas, Buffalo Bills (AP-NT)	Bob Baumhower, Miami Dolphins (NEA-2, AP-2-NT); Gary Johnson, San Diego Chargers (AP-2); Dan Hampton, Chicago Bears (AP-2); Doug English, Detroit Lions (NEA-2)
Middle linebacker	Jack Lambert, Pittsburgh Steelers (AP, NEA, PFWA, PFW)	Harry Carson, New York Giants (AP-2); George Cumby, Green Bay Packers (NEA-2)
Outside linebacker	Ted Hendricks, Los Angeles Raiders (AP); Hugh Green, Tampa Bay Buccaneers (PFWA, PFW); Lawrence Taylor, New York Giants (AP, NEA, PFWA, PFW); Rod Martin, Los Angeles Raiders (NEA)	Hugh Green, Tampa Bay Buccaneers (AP-2, NEA-2); Keena Turner, San Francisco 49ers (NEA-2); Joel Williams, Atlanta Falcons (AP-2)
Cornerback	Mark Haynes, New York Giants (AP, PFWA, PFW); Everson Walls, Dallas Cowboys (PFWA, PFW); Louis Breeden, Cincinnati Bengals (AP, NEA); Mike Haynes, New England Patriots (NEA)	Lester Hayes, Los Angeles Raiders (NEA-2); Everson Walls, Dallas Cowboys (AP-2, NEA-2); Mike Haynes, New England Patriots (AP-2)
Safety	Donnie Shell, Pittsburgh Steelers (AP, PFWA-SS); Nolan Cromwell, Los Angeles Rams (AP, PFWA-FS); Kenny Easley, Seattle Seahawks (NEA, PFW); Gary Barbaro, Kansas City Chiefs (NEA); Gary Fencik, Chicago Bears (PFW)	Tim Fox, San Diego Chargers (AP-2); Neal Colzie, Tampa Bay Buccaneers (AP-2); Darrol Ray, New York Jets (NEA-2); Donnie Shell, Pittsburgh Steelers (NEA-2)

== Key ==
- AP = Associated Press first-team All-Pro
- AP-2 = Associated Press second-team All-Pro
- NEA = Newspaper Enterprise Association first-team All-Pro team
- NEA-2 = Newspaper Enterprise Association second-team All-Pro team
- PFW = Pro Football Weekly All-Pro team
- PFWA = Pro Football Writers Association All-NFL
