= Los Angeles Chargers Hall of Fame =

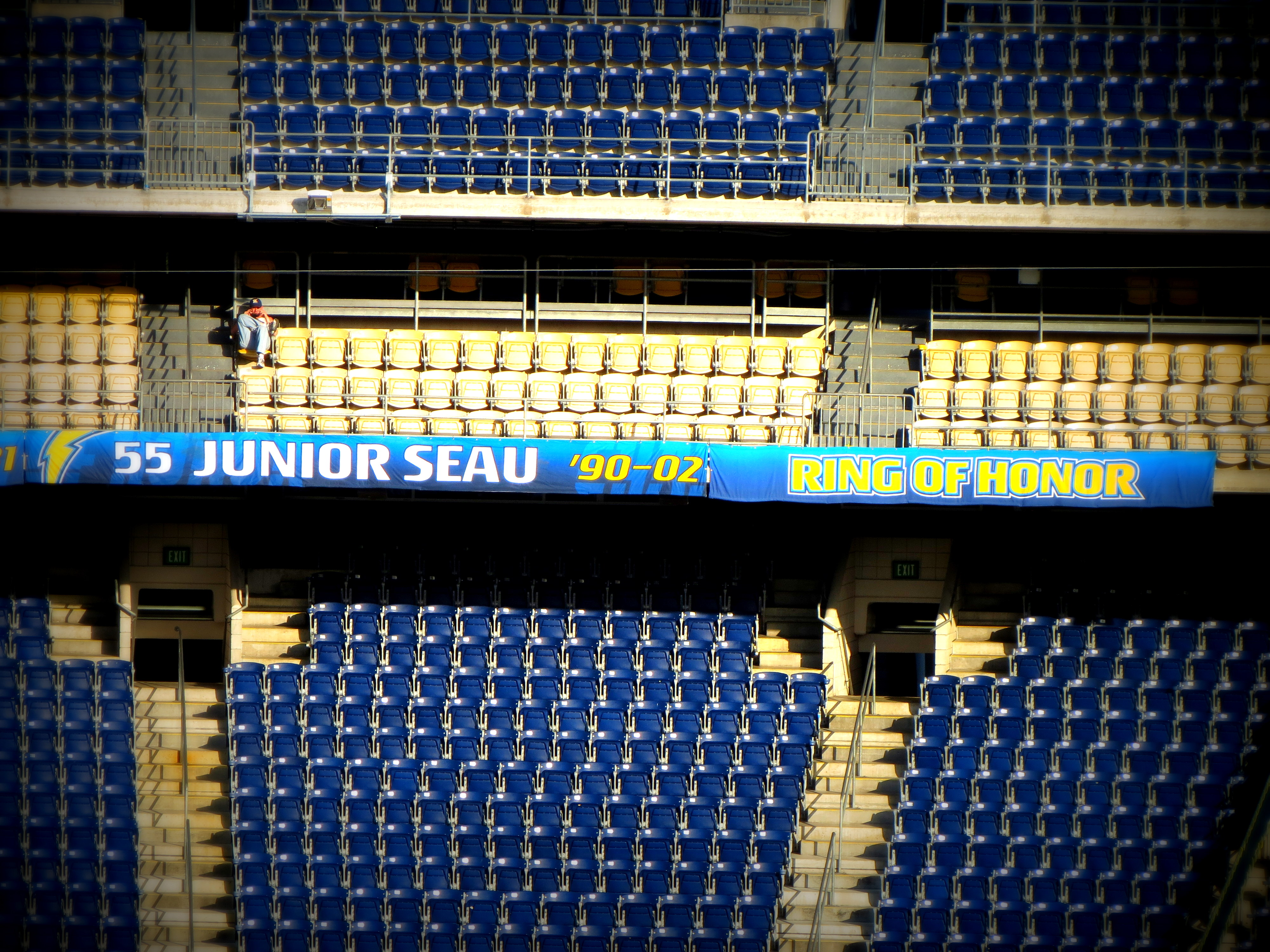
Junior Seau honored at the Chargers Ring of Honor in San Diego

The Los Angeles Chargers are a professional American football team in the National Football League (NFL) based in the Los Angeles Area. The club began play in 1960 as a charter member of the American Football League (AFL), and spent its first season in Los Angeles before moving to San Diego in 1961. They returned to Los Angeles in 2017. The Chargers created their Hall of Fame in 1976. Eligible candidates for the Hall of Fame must have been retired for at least four seasons. Selections are made by a five-member committee chaired by Dean Spanos, Chargers vice-chairman. As of 1992, other committee members included Bob Breitbard, founder of the San Diego Hall of Champions; Ron Fowler, president of the Greater San Diego Sports Association; Jane Rappoport, president of the Charger Backers; and Bill Johnston, the team's director of public relations.

The initial four members—former players Emil Karas, Frank Buncom, Bob Laraba, and Jacque MacKinnon—were inducted posthumously in 1976. From 1986 through 1992, there were no new inductions. The Los Angeles Times wrote in 1992, "The Chargers have not done a good job in recent years of recognizing their former players." Dan Fouts and Charlie Joiner were inducted in 1993. "It embarrasses me to go into the Hall of Fame before Don Coryell, because if it wasn't for Don Coryell, I wouldn't be in the Hall of Fame for the Chargers," said Fouts of his former head coach. Coryell was inducted the following year. The Chargers allowed the 2012 inductee to be determined by fans, who selected punter Darren Bennett.

The members of the Hall of Fame are honored at the Chargers Walk of Fame at the entrance to their practice facility in El Segundo, California. They were previously recognized in San Diego at the Chargers Ring of Honor, viewable above the visiting team's sideline of Qualcomm Stadium on the press level. It was founded in 2000 as part of the team's season-long celebration of its 40th anniversary. Before its introduction that season, the Chargers and the Oakland Raiders were the only NFL teams without a Ring of Honor. In 2013, the Chargers also inducted their 1963 AFL Championship team into their Ring of Honor; 15 members of that team were already in the team's Hall of Fame.

== Key ==
Inducted	Year officially inducted
Name	Name of inductee
Position	Player position or other role of inductee
Years	Years with the Chargers
No.	Jersey number with Chargers (players only)
*	Member of Pro Football Hall of Fame
^	Number retired by the Chargers

== Hall of Fame inductees ==
Inducted	Name	Position	Years	No.	Ref
1976	Emil Karas	LB	1960–1966	56	
1976	Frank Buncom	LB	1962–1968	55	
1976	Bob Laraba	LB	1960–1961	53	
1976	Jacque MacKinnon	TE	1961–1969	38	
1977	Lance Alworth*	WR	1962–1970	19^	
1978	Ron Mix*	OT	1960–1969	74	
1979	Paul Lowe	RB	1960–1968	23	
1980	Barron Hilton	Majority owner	1960–1966	–	
1980	Keith Lincoln	RB	1961–1968	22	
1981	Ernie Ladd	DT	1961–1965	77	
1981	Walt Sweeney	G	1963–1973	78	
1983	John Hadl	QB	1962–1972	21	
1984	Chuck Allen	LB	1961–1969	50	
1985	Gary Garrison	WR	1966–1976	27	
1985	Sid Gillman*	Head coach	1961–1969, 1971	–	
1986	Earl Faison	DE	1961–1966	86	
1993	Dan Fouts*	QB	1973–1987	14^	
1993	Charlie Joiner*	WR	1976–1986	18^	
1994	Don Coryell*	Head coach	1978–1986	–	
1995	Speedy Duncan	CB	1964–1970	45	
1995	Russ Washington	OT	1968–1982	70	
1995	Kellen Winslow*	TE	1979–1987	80^	
1996	George Pernicano	Minority owner	1961–present	–	
1997	Rolf Benirschke	K	1978–1987	6	
1998	Gill Byrd	CB	1983–1992	22	
1999	Gary "Big Hands" Johnson	DT	1975–1984	79	
2000	Doug Wilkerson	G	1971–1984	63	
2001	Wes Chandler	WR	1981–1987	89	
2002	Stan Humphries	QB	1992–1997	12	
2002	Bobby Ross	Head coach	1992–1996	–	
2003	Louie Kelcher	DT	1975–1983	74	
2004	Don Macek	C	1976–1989	62	
2004	Ed White	G	1978–1985	67	
2008	Fred Dean*	DE	1975–1981	71	
2011	Junior Seau*	LB	1990–2002	55^	
2012	Darren Bennett	P	1995–2003	2	
2014	Leslie O'Neal	DE	1986–1995	91	
2015	LaDainian Tomlinson*	RB	2001–2009	21^	
2018	Bobby Beathard*	General manager	1990–2000	–	
2022	Jamal Williams	NT	1998–2009	76	
2023	Antonio Gates*	TE	2003–2018	85	
2025	Rodney Harrison	S	1994–2002	37	

== See also ==
- San Diego Chargers 40th Anniversary Team
- San Diego Chargers 50th Anniversary Team
