= Rolf Benirschke =

American football player (born 1955)

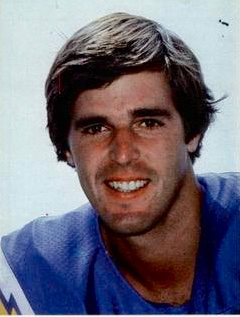
- Benirschke with the San Diego Chargers c. 1982

No. 6
- Position: Kicker

Personal information
- Born: February 7, 1955 (age 71); Boston, Massachusetts, U.S.
- Listed height: 6 ft 0 in (1.83 m)
- Listed weight: 171 lb (78 kg)

Career information
- High school: La Jolla (San Diego, California)
- College: UC Davis
- NFL draft: 1977: 12th round, 334th overall pick

Career history
- San Diego Chargers (1977–1986)

Awards and highlights
- NFL Man of the Year (1983); Second-team All-Pro (1980); Pro Bowl (1982); George Halas Award (1981); Los Angeles Chargers Hall of Fame; San Diego Chargers 50th Anniversary Team; San Diego Chargers 40th Anniversary Team

Career NFL statistics
- Games played: 121
- Field goals attempted: 208
- Field goals made: 146
- Field goal %: 70.2
- Stats at Pro Football Reference

Rolf Joachim Benirschke (born February 7, 1955) is an American former professional football player who was a placekicker in the National Football League (NFL). He played for the San Diego Chargers from 1977 until 1986. He is probably most known for missing a potential 27-yard game-winning field goal in overtime of the playoff game known as the "Epic in Miami” but then getting a second chance and connecting from 29 yards fourteen minutes into overtime to win the game on January 2, 1982.

Following his retirement from football, Benirschke was hired by Merv Griffin to replace Pat Sajak as host of the daytime game show Wheel of Fortune in 1989 after seeing him on a talk show.

== Early career ==
He was born in Boston, Massachusetts in 1955, but grew up in San Diego, California and attended La Jolla High School. His father Kurt Benirschke, a German immigrant, was a pathologist at the University of California, San Diego School of Medicine and the founder/director of the Center for the Reproduction of Endangered Species at the San Diego Zoo, where Rolf worked summers in high school and college.

Rolf Benirschke majored in zoology at the University of California, Davis, where he played football under coach Jim Sochor. He was selected by the Oakland Raiders in the 12th round of the 1977 NFL draft, and was then traded to the San Diego Chargers for his rookie year in the National Football League.

In the off-season before the 1978 season (his second season) he developed chronic fever, abdominal cramps, and diarrhea. He learned that he had ulcerative colitis—a form of inflammatory bowel disease.

== Living with ulcerative colitis ==
His health problems got worse in the 1979 season, when, on the team plane coming home from a road trip, Benirschke collapsed. He underwent two surgeries to remove his large intestine and he was in the intensive care unit for weeks. When released from the hospital, he weighed only 123 pounds and had to adjust to life with two ostomy appliances. His ileostomy was eventually reversed in a Kock pouch procedure.

On Sunday, November 18, 1979, Benirschke made his dramatic return to the Chargers in a game against the Pittsburgh Steelers. While he did not play, he participated in the opening coin toss and was named honorary team captain for the game, which was a sellout. Louie Kelcher, a Chargers' defensive tackle, assisted him and held his hand out onto the field. The Chargers won the game 35–7.

From 1980 to 1982, Benirschke was also a broadcaster for the San Diego Sockers of the former North American Soccer League.

In 1980 Benirschke returned to kicking and played seven more seasons with the team before retiring in 1987 as the team's all-time leader in points scored (766).

He was named the NFL Man of the Year in 1983. He was selected to the Pro Bowl after the 1983 season. In 1984, his kickoffs were viewed to be too short, and he gave a thumbs-up sign to Denver Broncos kicker Rich Karlis before a field goal that defeated the Chargers, prompting a meeting with San Diego owner Alex Spanos over Benirschke's loyalties. Although Benirschke had the third-highest field goal percentage in NFL history, the Chargers selected punter/kicker Ralf Mojsiejenko in the 1985 NFL draft to provide competition.

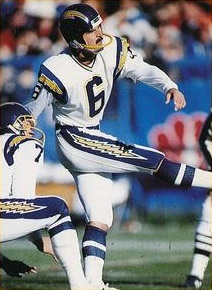
Benirschke c. 1986

On August 31, 1987, Benirschke was traded to the Dallas Cowboys for a draft pick after he lost his job to rookie Vince Abbott. He was released by Dallas on September 7, and formally announced his retirement in December. After 10 years with San Diego, he retired as the team's all-time scoring leader with 766 points and held 15 club records. He made 146 field goals in 208 tries for a .702 field goal percentage- at the time the third most-accurate in league history behind Eddie Murray and Nick Lowery.

In 1997, he was the twentieth player inducted into the Chargers Hall of Fame.

== Life after football ==
Benirschke hosted the daytime version of the TV game show Wheel of Fortune from January 10 to June 30, 1989, after Pat Sajak left the daytime version to host The Pat Sajak Show; Sajak continued to host the nighttime syndicated version until 2024. When the daytime version moved to CBS, Bob Goen succeeded Benirschke as host. He has not been involved in television since, but was among the many participants in the E! Network's True Hollywood Story episode on Wheel.

He founded and later sold a financial services company, and has been involved in venture capital and development groups. He is the national spokesman for the Crohn's and Colitis Foundation of America and for Hepatitis C awareness.

In November 1996, he published his book, Alive and Kicking!

During and after his football tenure he was also an endangered-animal activist who created a well-known, endangered-animal charity, "Kicks for Critters."

He currently devotes much of his time to Legacy Health Strategies, a strategic planning and marketing company servicing selected medical device and pharma companies by developing patient-support and awareness programs that service different disease states.

Benirschke routinely speaks at national sales meetings, for major corporations, and at health-related events across the country. Some of his clients include UCSD Medical Center, Kaiser Permanente, Dartmouth Hitchcock Medical Center, The American Liver Foundation, the National Centers for Disease Control, Emdeon, Pacific Life, The Hartford, Nanogen, WOC Nurses, YPO groups, and many others. Rolf Benirschke

He is married to the former Mary Michaletz; the couple has four children. He is active in the San Diego, California area, volunteering his time with organizations like the San Diego Zoo, United Way, the Chargers, the Boys & Girls Clubs of East County and the San Diego Blood Bank. Every year, he is in charge of the Rolf Benirschke Legacy Golf Invitational, held at the Rancho Santa Fe Farms Golf Club in Rancho Santa Fe, California. Additionally, hosting a youth golf tournament at Pro Kids. Some of the money is donated to charities such as the Crohn's & Colitis Foundation of America and the Prostate Cancer Foundation.

== Career regular season statistics ==
Career high/best bold

Season	Team	G	FGM	FGA	%	LNG	XPM	XPA	%	PTS
1977	SD	14	17	23	73.9	47	21	24	87.5	72
1978	SD	15	18	22	81.8	44	37	43	86.0	91
1979	SD	4	4	4	100.0	42	12	13	92.3	24
1980	SD	16	24	36	66.7	53	46	48	95.8	118
1981	SD	16	19	26	73.1	52	55	61	90.2	112
1982	SD	9	16	22	72.7	50	32	34	94.1	80
1983	SD	16	15	24	62.5	51	43	45	95.6	88
1984	SD	14	17	26	65.4	51	41	41	100.0	92
1985	SD	1	—	—	—	—	2	2	100.0	2
1986	SD	16	16	25	64.0	50	39	41	95.1	87
Career		121	146	208	70.2	53	328	352	93.2	766

== See also ==
- List of people diagnosed with ulcerative colitis
