= Doug Wilkerson =

American football player (1947–2021)

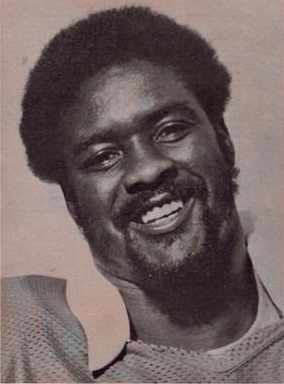
- Wilkerson with the Chargers c. 1976

No. 63
- Position: Guard

Personal information
- Born: March 27, 1947; Fayetteville, North Carolina, U.S.
- Died: February 21, 2021 (aged 73); Encinitas, California, U.S.
- Listed height: 6 ft 3 in (1.91 m)
- Listed weight: 253 lb (115 kg)

Career information
- High school: E. E. Smith (Fayetteville)
- College: North Carolina College (1966–1969)
- NFL draft: 1970: 1st round, 14th overall pick

Career history
- Houston Oilers (1970); San Diego Chargers (1971–1984); Graz Giants (1987)

Awards and highlights
- First-team All-Pro (1982); 2× Second-team All-Pro (1979, 1980); 3× Pro Bowl (1980–1982); Los Angeles Chargers Hall of Fame; San Diego Chargers 50th Anniversary Team; San Diego Chargers 40th Anniversary Team; Austrian Football League champion (1987); First-team Little All-American (1969)

Career NFL statistics
- Games played: 204
- Games started: 195
- Fumble recoveries: 9
- Stats at Pro Football Reference

Douglas Wilkerson (March 27, 1947 – February 21, 2021) was an American professional football player who was a guard in the National Football League (NFL) for the Houston Oilers and San Diego Chargers. Named to the Pro Bowl three times, he was also a three-time All-Pro, including a first-team selection in 1982. He was inducted into the Chargers Hall of Fame. He also played one season in the Austrian Football League for the Graz Giants in 1987.

== Early life and college ==
Wilkerson was born on March 27, 1947, in Fayetteville, North Carolina. He grew up in a military family in Fayetteville, where he attended E. E. Smith High School. He was recruited by many of the college football powerhouses, including Michigan, Michigan State, Minnesota, Duke and Wake Forest. Initially, Wilkerson accepted a scholarship to play at Michigan State under coach Duffy Daugherty. However, E.E. Smith's principal, E.E. Miller, stripped him of the scholarship as punishment for a school incident. A student egged Wilkerson into a foot race; Wilkerson capitulated and won the race. The challenger refused to settle the wager, prompting Wilkerson to knock him to the ground. Miller's punishment could have been ignored, as no NCAA rules were broken, but Miller was both respected and feared. Daugherty did not try to get involved, nor did Wilkerson ask him to.

Wilkerson decided to attend the historically black college North Carolina Central University (NCCU), known then as North Carolina College, where some of his former classmates were also enrolled. At NCCU, Wilkerson earned national honors as a lineman on both offense and defense. As a junior in 1968, he was named to the small college Little All-American team on defense as a middle guard by the American Football Coaches Association (AFCA). The following year, the AFCA selected him to the team as a defensive tackle, while the Associated Press named him as an offensive tackle.

North Carolina Central retired Wilkerson's No. 63 in 1970. He was inducted into the North Carolina Central University Hall of Fame and the Black College Football Hall of Fame.

== Professional career ==
Wilkerson was selected by the Houston Oilers in the first round of the 1970 NFL draft with the 14th overall pick. The first offensive lineman drafted that year, he is North Carolina Central's highest overall NFL draft selection. As a rookie in 1970, Wilkerson also played as a defensive end. After the season, he was traded to the San Diego Chargers for tight end Willie Frazier.

Playing 14 seasons with San Diego, Wilkerson was named the team's Lineman of the Year seven times, including four straight from 1974 through 1977. The Chargers struggled in his first seven seasons before Don Coryell became their head coach mid-season in 1978. They reached the playoffs from 1979 through 1982, finishing in the top-4 in the NFL in points each season, twice leading the league. San Diego won three straight AFC West division titles and played in back-to-back AFC Championship Games. Their Hall of Fame quarterback, Dan Fouts, in appreciation of the offensive line's critical role in the success of their Air Coryell offense, treated his blockers to dinner before each game. Playing on one of the NFL's most prolific offenses, Wilkerson was named to three straight Pro Bowls starting in 1980. He earned second-team All-Pro honors in 1979 and 1980 before being named to the first-team in 1982. In 1984, Wilkerson was named the co-winner of the Chargers' Lineman of the Year. Two and a half weeks into training camp in 1985, he announced his retirement.

In 15 NFL seasons, Wilkerson played in 204 regular-season games, starting 195. He ended his Chargers career with 195 games played, the second most in franchise history behind former teammate and fellow lineman Russ Washington. Wilkerson did not miss a game with San Diego until his ninth season there and missed just eight games total in 14 years. He was named to the Chargers Hall of Fame, as well as their 40th and 50th anniversary teams. He was also inducted into San Diego's Breitbard Hall of Fame.

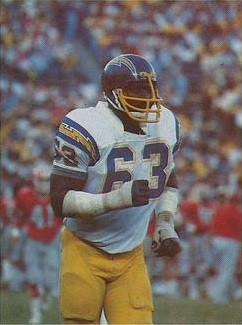
Wilkerson c. 1980

In 1987, Wilkerson came out of retirement, signing and playing for the Graz Giants of the Austrian Football League. He was the Giants' first NFL player and helped them win the Austrian Bowl for the league championship.

In his later years, Wilkerson was the strength and conditioning coach for the Los Angeles Raiders (1990–1994) and player relations executive for the St. Louis Rams (1995–1996).

== Personal life ==
Wilkerson died on February 21, 2021, at the age of 73.

Wilkerson's grandson Aeneas Peebles became an NFL defensive lineman.
