= Fred Dean =

American football player (1952–2020)

- Dean with the San Francisco 49ers in 1984

No. 71, 74
- Position: Defensive end

Personal information
- Born: February 24, 1952; Arcadia, Louisiana, U.S.
- Died: October 14, 2020 (aged 68); Jackson, Mississippi, U.S.
- Listed height: 6 ft 3 in (1.91 m)
- Listed weight: 230 lb (104 kg)

Career information
- High school: Ruston (Ruston, Louisiana)
- College: Louisiana Tech (1971–1974)
- NFL draft: 1975: 2nd round, 33rd overall pick

Career history
- San Diego Chargers (1975–1981); San Francisco 49ers (1981–1985)

Awards and highlights
- 2× Super Bowl champion (XVI, XIX); 2× First-team All-Pro (1980, 1981); 4× Pro Bowl (1979–1981, 1983); NFC Defensive Player of the Year (1981); San Francisco 49ers Hall of Fame; Los Angeles Chargers Hall of Fame; San Diego Chargers 50th Anniversary Team; San Diego Chargers 40th Anniversary Team; Second-team All-American (1974); First-team Little All-American (1974); NCAA Division II national champion (1973); Second-team Little All-American (1973); Louisiana Tech Athletic Hall of Fame

Career NFL statistics
- Sacks: 92.0
- Fumble recoveries: 13
- Interceptions: 1
- Interception yards: 22
- Defensive touchdowns: 2
- Stats at Pro Football Reference
- Pro Football Hall of Fame
- College Football Hall of Fame

Frederick Rudolph Dean (February 24, 1952 – October 14, 2020) was an American professional football player who was a defensive end in the National Football League (NFL). A two-time first-team All-Pro and a four-time Pro Bowler, he won two Super Bowls with the San Francisco 49ers. He was inducted into the Pro Football Hall of Fame in 2008.

Dean played college football for the Louisiana Tech Bulldogs. He was selected in the second round of the 1975 NFL draft by the San Diego Chargers. He was traded to San Francisco in 1981 due to a contract dispute. He is a member of both the Chargers Hall of Fame and 49ers Hall of Fame.

== Early life ==
Dean was born in Arcadia, the seat of Bienville Parish in north Louisiana. He grew up 20 miles (32 km) east in Ruston, where he attended the all-Black, segregated Lincoln High School. After integration, he moved as a junior to Ruston High, where he graduated.

== College career ==
Dean was a standout at Louisiana Tech University in Ruston, having spurned an opportunity to play for legendary coach Eddie Robinson at nearby Grambling State University, which at the time was sending African American players to the NFL on a yearly basis, as well as Southeastern Conference power LSU, where former Ruston High star Bert Jones was the starting quarterback (at the time of Dean's recruitment, LSU did not have a black player in its program). Playing mostly as an end, Dean excelled as a defensive lineman for the Bulldogs and was a four-time all-conference selection and two-time conference defensive player of the year in the Southland Conference. He was an All-American as a senior in 1974.

== Professional career ==
=== San Diego Chargers ===
Dean was selected by the San Diego Chargers in the second round of the 1975 NFL draft with the 33rd overall pick. Chargers coach Tommy Prothro initially projected him as a linebacker but eventually relented to Dean's wish to remain a lineman. As a rookie, he had seven sacks and registered his career-high of 93 tackles. He recorded 15 1/2 sacks in 1978. In 1979, the Chargers won the AFC West division while leading the AFC in fewest points allowed (246). Dean had nine sacks in 13 games and was named to the All-AFC team.

The Chargers again won the AFC West in 1980, with Dean teaming with fellow 1975 Charger draftees Gary "Big Hands" Johnson and Louie Kelcher as the Chargers led the NFL in sacks (60). Dean had missed the first two games of the season after not reporting, but still finished the season with 10 1/2 sacks. He and Johnson were named first-team All-Pro, with Kelcher being named second-team All-Pro. The trio along with Leroy Jones formed a defensive front that was nicknamed the Bruise Brothers.

=== San Francisco 49ers ===
In 1981, Dean was traded to the San Francisco 49ers due to a contract dispute with Chargers' owner Gene Klein. He complained that he was the lowest-paid sixth-year defensive lineman in 1980 and that his salary was below the average of all defensive linemen. Dean contended that he was making the same amount of money as his brother-in-law who was a truck driver. Originally set to make $75,000 that season, the 49ers renegotiated his contract to reportedly near $150,000 a year. The Chargers' defense would not be the same afterwards, and Don "Air" Coryell's Chargers teams are now most remembered for its high-scoring, pass-oriented offense that did not have enough defense to make it to a Super Bowl. In 2013, U-T San Diego called the Chargers trading Dean "perhaps the biggest blunder in franchise history". "I can't say how much it affected us, because we did make it to the AFC championship game," said Johnson of the Chargers without Dean. "But I could say if we had more pass rush from the corner, it might've been different".

With San Francisco, Dean was used as a pass-rush specialist, playing only when the 49ers switched from a 3–4 defense to a 4–3 or a 4–2 nickel. He joined the team mid-season for Game 6 against the Dallas Cowboys. After only a couple of practices, he played and was still able to record two sacks and apply pressure and repeatedly hurry Danny White in a 45–14 win by the 49ers. His performance was noted by author Tom Danyluk as "the greatest set of downs I have ever seen unleashed by a pass rusher". In what had been a game of possum, Bill Walsh, the 49er head coach, said to John Madden, who covered the game, "Fred (Dean) just got here... If he plays, he won't play much". But he played the whole game.

Two weeks later at home against the Los Angeles Rams, the 49ers won 20–17 for their first-ever win against the Rams at home in Candlestick Park, as Dean sacked Pat Haden 4 1/2 times. Dean was named the UPI NFC Defensive Player of the Year with 12 sacks while playing in 11 games for the 49ers. The 49ers went on to win Super Bowl XVI that year, and Steve Sabol (NFL Films) is quoted in 2006 as saying that Dean's acquisition was the last meaningful in-season trade, in that it affected the destination of the Lombardi Trophy. San Francisco, which was 3–2 when Dean arrived, won 13 of their final 14 games, including the playoffs.

In 1983, Dean recorded a career-high 17 1/2 sacks to lead the NFC and recorded a then-NFL record of six in one game, setting that mark during the 49ers’ 27–0 shutout of the New Orleans Saints on November 13, 1983.

Dean was also a key player on the 1984 squad than won Super Bowl XIX. He was reunited with his former Charger teammates Johnson, Kelcher and Billy Shields, who were acquired by the 49ers.

== Legacy ==
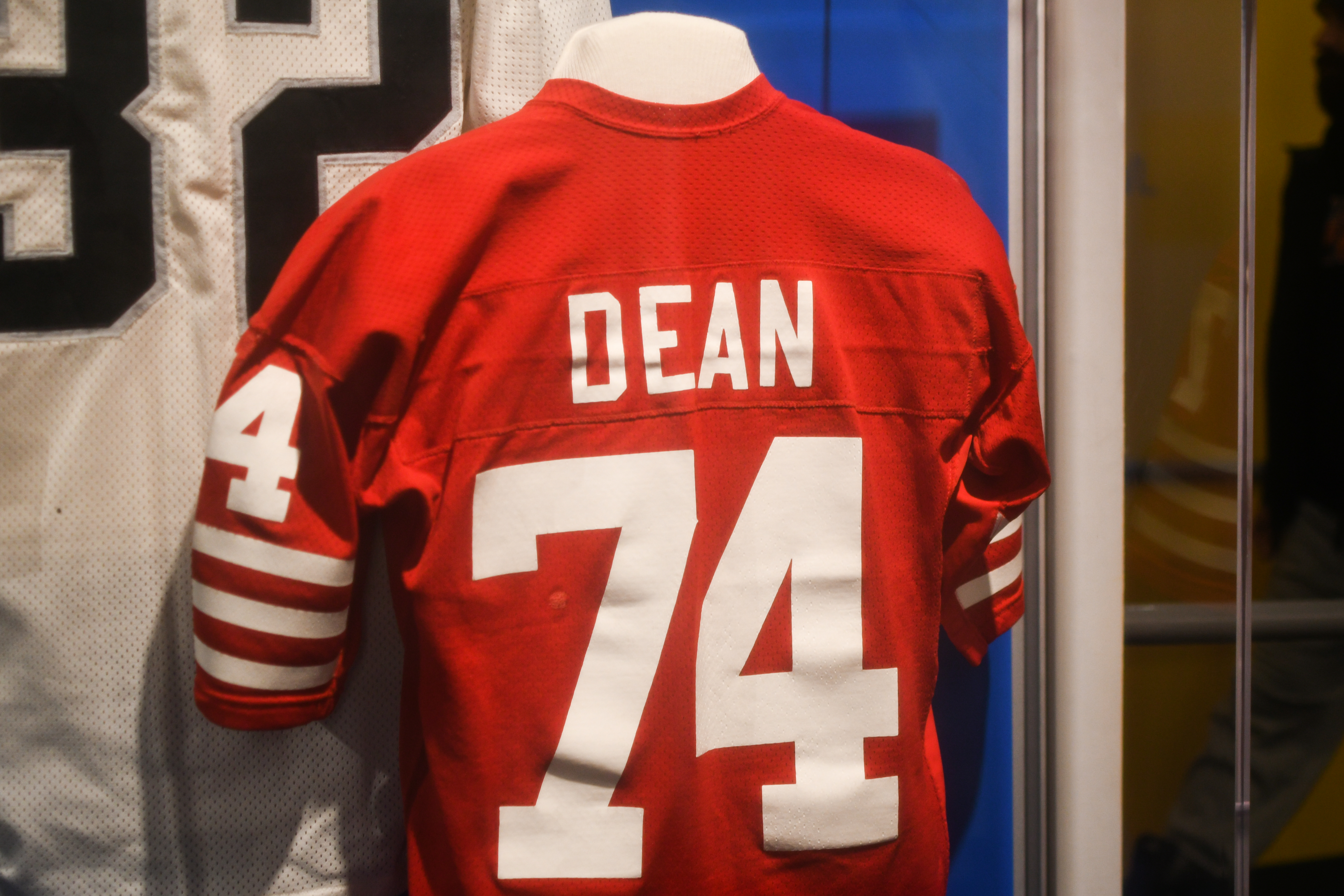
Dean's uniform with the San Francisco 49ers at the Pro Football Hall of Fame

Dean ended his NFL career with 93 unofficial sacks, according to the Professional Football Researchers Association. Dean was inducted into the Pro Football Hall of Fame in 2008, when his bust, sculpted by Scott Myers, was unveiled. He was also named to both the Chargers' 40th and 50th anniversary teams and inducted into the Chargers Hall of Fame.

Dean was inducted into the Louisiana Tech University Athletic Hall of Fame in 1990 and the Louisiana Sports Hall of Fame in 1995. In 2009, Dean was elected to the College Football Hall of Fame.

== Personal life and death ==
After his football career, Dean was a minister in his hometown, Ruston.

Dean died from COVID-19 while being airlifted from a hospital in West Monroe, Louisiana, to Jackson, Mississippi, on October 14, 2020, during the COVID-19 pandemic. He was 68.

Dean is one of at least 345 NFL players to be diagnosed after death with chronic traumatic encephalopathy (CTE), which is caused by repeated hits to the head.

== See also ==
- List of Pro Football Hall of Fame inductees
- List of NFL players with chronic traumatic encephalopathy
