= George Pernicano =

American businessman

George Pernicano (December 12, 1917 – October 6, 2016) was an American businessman. Along with Barron Hilton and other prominent San Diegans, Pernicano brought the Los Angeles Chargers to San Diego in 1961. He originally owned 7% of the team, but later held 3%. On September 8, 1996, he was inducted into the Chargers Hall of Fame. Pernicano attended every home game in the team's history until his death and only missed two away games: one for his grandson's wedding and one towards the end of his life due to health issues.

In 1960, he opened Casa di Baffi in San Diego's Hillcrest neighborhood. It closed in the early 1980s and was demolished in January 2022. City officials and neighboring business have expressed frustration over Pernicano's refusal to sell or redevelop the property. He died at the age of 98 on October 6, 2016.
