= Ed White (American football) =

American football player (born 1947)

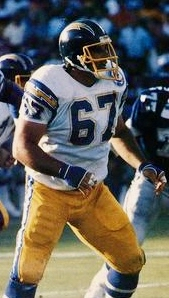
- White with the San Diego Chargers c. 1985

No. 62, 67
- Positions: Guard, Tackle

Personal information
- Born: April 4, 1947 (age 79); San Diego, California, U.S.
- Listed height: 6 ft 1 in (1.85 m)
- Listed weight: 269 lb (122 kg)

Career information
- High school: Helix (La Mesa, California); Indio (Indio, California)
- College: California (1966–1968)
- NFL draft: 1969: 2nd round, 39th overall pick

Career history

Playing
- Minnesota Vikings (1969–1977); San Diego Chargers (1978–1985)

Coaching
- San Diego Chargers (1990–1991) Tight ends coach; St. Louis Rams (1998) Offensive line coach

Awards and highlights
- NFL champion (1969); 4× Second-team All-Pro (1974–1976, 1979); 4× Pro Bowl (1975–1977, 1979); 50 Greatest Vikings; Minnesota Vikings 25th Anniversary Team; Minnesota Vikings 40th Anniversary Team; Los Angeles Chargers Hall of Fame; San Diego Chargers 50th Anniversary Team; San Diego Chargers 40th Anniversary Team; Consensus All-American (1968); First-team All-Pac-8 (1968)

Career NFL statistics
- Games played: 241
- Games started: 210
- Fumble recoveries: 4
- Stats at Pro Football Reference
- College Football Hall of Fame

Edward Alvin White (born April 4, 1947) is an American former professional football player who was a guard for 17 seasons with the Minnesota Vikings and San Diego Chargers of the National Football League (NFL). A four-time Pro Bowl selection, he retired from playing with the NFL record for the most career games by an offensive lineman.

White played college football for the California Golden Bears, earning consensus All-American honors in 1968. He was selected by Minnesota in the second round of the 1969 NFL/AFL draft and played nine seasons with the Vikings before being traded in 1978 to the Chargers, with whom he played another eight seasons. After his playing career, he has worked as a coach and an artist.

== Early life ==
White was born in Mercy Hospital in San Diego, California, and grew up in Lemon Grove. He attended Helix High School in La Mesa as a freshman before moving to the Coachella Valley, where he graduated from Indio High School.

== College career ==
White attended the University of California, Berkeley, where he played for the California Golden Bears (1966–1968) as a defensive lineman. He was named a consensus All-American at middle guard in 1968. He graduated with a degree in landscape architecture.

== Professional career ==
White began his professional football career with the Minnesota Vikings after being selected in the second round of the 1969 NFL/AFL draft. The Vikings moved him to offensive guard, joining a line that included Mick Tingelhoff, Ron Yary, and Grady Alderman. In White's rookie season in 1969, Minnesota scored more points than any NFL or American Football League (AFL) team. He is one of eight players to have played in all four Vikings Super Bowl appearances, all losses, between 1969 and 1976. Minnesota qualified for the playoffs in eight of his nine seasons with the team, and he was named to three Pro Bowls.

Before the 1978 season, White was traded to the San Diego Chargers for running back Rickey Young. White played another eight seasons with the Chargers and became a fan favorite. San Diego finished 9–7 in 1978 for their first winning season in nine years. He earned his fourth Pro Bowl selection in 1979, when the Chargers made the first of four consecutive playoff appearances (1979–1982). During the span, San Diego finished in the top-4 in the NFL in points each season, twice leading the league, and their potent Air Coryell offense led the league in multiple other categories. The Chargers won three straight AFC West division titles (1979–1981), and they advanced to the AFC Championship Game twice (1980, 1981). San Diego quarterback Dan Fouts, a future Hall of Famer, revered White and the Chargers' offensive line, which led the NFL from 1981 to 1983 in fewest sacks allowed per pass attempt. White was a five-time captain for the Chargers and named their lineman of the year from 1983 to 1985. In the 1985 season finale, he played in his 241st career NFL game, breaking his former Minnesota teammate Mick Tingelhoff's record for most games by an NFL offensive lineman. (Note: White's record was broken by Jeff Van Note in 1986.) Prior to the 1986 season, White retired after 17 years.

After retiring from playing, White worked for the Chargers as an offensive line coach in 1986 and 1987.

== Awards and honors ==
Following his retirement, he was inducted into the College Football Hall of Fame, University of California Athletic Hall of Fame, Breitbard Hall of Fame, East-West Shrine Game Hall of Fame, and Chargers Hall of Fame. He was named to the Vikings 25th and 40th anniversary teams, while he was placed on the Chargers 40th and 50th anniversary teams. Indio High School named their football field Ed White Stadium in his honor in 1991. As a testament to his impact on every team he played on, White was selected in 2015 to the Pac-12 All Century Football team as a defensive tackle for Cal.

Charger quarterback Dan Fouts has been vocal about endorsing White for the Pro Football Hall of Fame: “When he retired, nobody had played in more games (241) as an offensive lineman than Ed White. They don’t have many statistics for offensive linemen other than Pro Bowls and Super Bowls, but Ed would be a leader. He was one of the most feared offensive linemen in the game. You talk to guys like Howie Long and Matt Millen who had to go against Big Ed. They hated it.” Chargers center/guard Dennis McKnight has called White “probably the best all-around offensive lineman in the league in terms of run blocking and pass blocking.” Kansas City Chiefs offensive tackle Kyle Turley has called White the best coach he'd ever had.

In 2019, the Professional Football Researchers Association named White to the PFRA Hall of Very Good Class of 2019. He was inducted into the California High School Football Hall of Fame in September 2024.

== Later life ==
After football, White devoted his life to a wide range of art, including painting, sculpting and poetry. He was active in Westward Ho, a foundation that taught children about the pioneer experience. After the founder died, White became the executive director and renamed it to Oak Lake Art Center.

== Personal life ==
White married his high school sweetheart, Joan, in 1968. Their daughter Amy died of pneumonia after a freak head injury in 1997. Their home in Julian, California, burned in the Cedar Fire in 2003. In 2018, White was diagnosed with Alzheimer's disease.
