= Ron Mix =

American football player (born 1938)

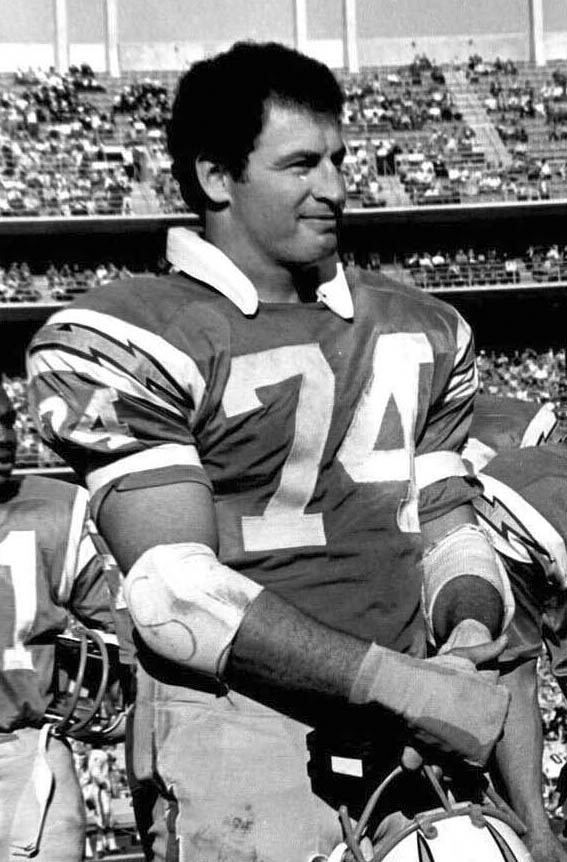
- Mix with the San Diego Chargers in 1969

No. 74, 77
- Position: Offensive tackle

Personal information
- Born: March 10, 1938 (age 88); Los Angeles, California, U.S.
- Listed height: 6 ft 4 in (1.93 m)
- Listed weight: 250 lb (113 kg)

Career information
- High school: Hawthorne (Hawthorne, California)
- College: USC (1956–1959)
- NFL draft: 1960: 1st round, 10th overall pick
- AFL draft: 1960

Career history
- Los Angeles / San Diego Chargers (1960–1969); Oakland Raiders (1971)

Awards and highlights
- AFL champion (1963); 9× All-AFL (1960–1968); 8× AFL All-Star (1961–1968); AFL All-Time Team; Los Angeles Chargers Hall of Fame; First-team All-PCC (1959)

Career NFL statistics
- Games played: 142
- Games started: 130
- Stats at Pro Football Reference
- Pro Football Hall of Fame

Ronald Jack Mix (born March 10, 1938) is an American former professional football player who was an offensive tackle in the American Football League (AFL) and National Football League (NFL). He is a member of the AFL All-Time Team, and was inducted into the Pro Football Hall of Fame in 1979. Mix played college football for the USC Trojans, where he was named to the All American team. He played at right tackle and guard for the Los Angeles / San Diego Chargers of the AFL and also played for the Oakland Raiders of the NFL. While playing in Oakland for the Raiders he was a part of the only offensive line in NFL history to be composed entirely all Hall of Famers. Art Shell, Gene Upshaw, Jim Otto, Ron Mix, and Bob Brown from left to right. An eight-time AFL All-Star (1961–1968) and a nine-time All-AFL (1960–1968) selection, he is also a member of the Los Angeles Chargers Hall of Fame.

== Early and personal life ==
Mix was born in Los Angeles, California, grew up in its Boyle Heights neighborhood, and is Jewish. He attended Hawthorne High School in Hawthorne, California.

Mix, who was listed at 6' 5" and 270 pounds, was an early proponent of weightlifting to enhance athletic power. He was years ahead of the curve that soon saw lineman and other football players taking up that practice to become better athletes. His lifts included a military press of 300 pounds, a clean and jerk of 325 pounds, and a bench press of 425 pounds, all of the lifts considered to be exceptionally strong for that era of play.

Mix went to the University of San Diego Law School in the off-season and earned a Juris Doctor degree in 1971. He was nicknamed "The Intellectual Assassin" for his combination of intellectual excellence with his style of physical play.

== College career ==
Mix attended the University of Southern California (USC) on a football scholarship. There in 1959 he was a First Team All American, AP First Team All-Pacific Coast, First Team All Big Five, and won the USC Lineman Award. He was a member of the Delta Chi fraternity. At USC he minored in English. During his career Mix wrote a number of articles for Sports Illustrated. He was elected the National Jewish College Athlete of the Year.

== Professional career ==
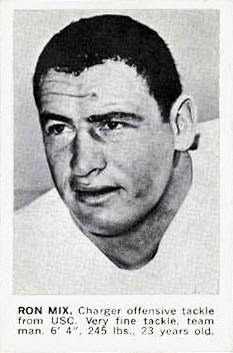
Mix football card issued in 1961

Mix was selected in the first round by two teams in 1960. The Baltimore Colts picked him as the tenth pick in 1960 on November 30 in the National Football League. He was drafted by the Boston Patriots in the first round of the American Football League draft. The rights to Mix were traded to the Los Angeles Chargers, who felt they had a worthy chance at getting the local player to sign with them. Baltimore offered him an $8,000 salary and a $1,000 signing bonus while Los Angeles offered $12,000 and a $5,000 bonus. Mix said he would've signed with Baltimore if they countered with a deal of $10,000 salary and $2,000 bonus. The Colts, telling him the league would flop in a year, declined, and Mix elected to sign with Los Angeles.

He was a factor in the Chargers' early domination of the AFL's Western Division, and in San Diego helped them win an American Football League Championship in 1963, when they defeated the Boston Patriots 51–10 in the championship game. Mix was called for a mere two holding penalties in ten years. His coach in Sid Gillman once called him "the best offensive lineman I’ve ever seen."

Mix was the first white player in the 1965 AFL All-Star game in New Orleans to step forward and join his black teammates in a civil rights boycott. The racist environment of New Orleans caused the black players to say they weren't playing in a city that denied them the most basic rights (to eat, to get a cab, etc.). He made it clear that if the black players were not going to play, neither would he. That caused other white players to join the boycott. The game was then moved to Houston.

He was elected to the AFL All-Star team for eight straight years as a Charger, was a nine-time All-AFL selection, is a member of the All-time All-AFL Team, and is one of only 20 men who played the entire 10 years of the AFL. He was the first Charger to have his number retired in 1969 after he announced he was quitting football after playing injured that season. He earned a J.D. degree from the University of San Diego School of Law in 1970.

Mix told the Chargers he wanted to play again, but they had found a replacement in Gene Ferguson. After he asked to be traded to the New York Jets, San Diego dealt him to the Oakland Raiders for two high draft picks in 1970 and 1971. The deal was contingent upon Mix unretiring and agreeing to play for Oakland; he played with the Raiders in 1971. Chargers owner Eugene V. Klein, who hated the Raiders, unretired Mix's number 74.

Mix was also the general manager of the WFL Portland Storm in 1974.

== Halls of fame ==
In 1969 Mix was unanimously voted to the All-Time AFL Team by the Pro Football Hall of Fame, and named to the Chargers Hall of Fame in 1978.

He was voted to the Pro Football Hall of Fame in 1979. Mix was also elected a member of the International Jewish Sports Hall of Fame in 1980, inducted into the Southern California Jewish Sports Hall of Fame in 1990, inducted into the National Jewish Sports Hall of Fame in 2008, and inducted into the Jewish Sports Hall of Fame of Northern California in 2010. He was the second player from the AFL to be inducted into the Pro Football Hall of Fame. Lance Alworth was the first in 1978.

== After football ==
Mix practiced law in San Diego, California, with his business focused on representing retired professional athletes in claims for workers' compensation benefits. Prior to that, he was a civil litigator.

In 2016, the IRS accused Mix of filing a false tax return. Federal prosecutors said Mix got referrals for clients from a non-lawyer, a former professional basketball player client of his named Kermit Washington and that Mix made contributions to two charitable foundations run by Washington that supported a school and other causes in Africa. Mix took tax deductions for the contributions. Court records alleged that Washington diverted most of money donated to his charities for his own personal use. Mix pled guilty to one count of filing a false tax return. The plea agreement specifically said that Mix believed the charity was legitimate and did not know the funds were being diverted. Nonetheless, claiming the charitable contributions were wrong because Mix got something of value—the referrals. US District Judge Greg Kays imposed a time-served sentence (less than probation). On February 24, 2019, Mix was permanently disbarred.

== See also ==
- List of American Football League players
- List of select Jewish football players
