= American Football League All-League Team =

The Sporting News published an American Football League All-League Team, often referred to as All-AFL, for each season played by the American Football League (AFL), 1960 through 1969. From 1960 through 1966, the All-League team was selected by the AFL players, and from 1967 through 1969 it was selected by a consensus of The Sporting News (TSN), the Associated Press (AP), United Press International (UPI), and the Newspaper Enterprise Association (NEA). The AFL All-League selections usually included one player at each team position on offense and on defense (i.e., one quarterback, two guards, four defensive backs, etc.).

== Seasons ==
- 1960 All-AFL Team
- 1961 All-AFL Team
- 1962 All-AFL Team
- 1963 All-AFL Team
- 1964 All-AFL Team
- 1965 All-AFL Team
- 1966 All-AFL Team
- 1967 All-AFL Team
- 1968 All-AFL Team
- 1969 All-AFL Team
