= 1979 San Diego Chargers season =

1979 NFL team season

- Owner: Eugene V. Klein
- General manager: Johnny Sanders
- Head coach: Don Coryell
- Offensive coordinator: Joe Gibbs
- Defensive coordinator: Jackie Simpson
- Home stadium: San Diego Stadium

Results
- Record: 12–4
- Division place: 1st AFC West
- Playoffs: Lost Divisional Playoffs (vs. Oilers) 14–17
- All-Pros: 4: QB Dan Fouts (1st team); WR John Jefferson (1st team); G Ed White (2nd team); T Russ Washington (2nd team)
- Pro Bowlers: 7: QB Dan Fouts; WR John Jefferson; WR Charlie Joiner; G Ed White; T Russ Washington; DE Fred Dean; DT Gary Johnson

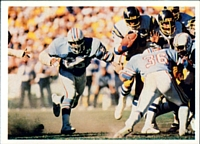
The Chargers attempting to rush the ball through the Oilers' defensive line during the 1979 AFC Divisional Playoff Game.

The 1979 San Diego Chargers season was the team's twentieth season, and tenth in the National Football League. The 1979 Chargers finished in first place in the AFC West after having finished 9–7 in 1978. The Chargers made the playoffs for the first time in fourteen years. At 12–4 the Chargers shared the best record in the AFC with the Pittsburgh Steelers, and were awarded the top AFC seed because they beat the Steelers in the regular season. This would remain their best record during the Coryell era.

Chargers quarterback Dan Fouts threw for 4,082 yards to break Joe Namath's professional record of 4,007 in 1967 (albeit with the benefit of two extra regular season games). Wide receivers Charlie Joiner and John Jefferson both gained more than 1,000 yards receiving, the first NFL teammates to accomplish the feat since the Namath-led New York Jets' duo of George Sauer and Don Maynard. The Chargers became the first AFC West champion to run more passing plays (541) than rushing (481). Clarence Williams was the leading rusher with 752 yards and a club-record 12 touchdowns.

In contrast to much of the "Air Coryell" period, the Charger defense was as strong as the offense, ranking 2nd in the league in yards allowed. Eight players combined to snag 28 interceptions, with linebackers Woodrow Lowe and Ray Preston finishing with five each. Wilbur Young led the team with 12 sacks. Kicker Rolf Benirschke began the year well, making all four of his kicks, but collapsed on the plane home from the Week 4 game at New England. He was diagnosed with ulcerative colitis and missed the rest of the season. Three-time Super Bowl winner Roy Gerela was brought in as replacement, but made only one kick from seven before making way for Mike Wood, who finished 11 of 14, with all three misses coming from 50+ yards.

The season ended with a playoff loss to the Houston Oilers. It was the Chargers' first playoff game since the 1965 AFL Championship game loss to the Buffalo Bills.

As part of a marketing campaign, the Chargers created their fight song, "San Diego Super Chargers".

The 2006 edition of Pro Football Prospectus, listed the 1979 Chargers as one of their "Heartbreak Seasons", in which teams "dominated the entire regular season only to falter in the playoffs, unable to close the deal." Said Pro Football Prospectus of the team, "the creative [head coach] Don Coryell always designed potent offenses, but the San Diego defense didn't catch up until 1979. ... In their first playoff game, the Chargers hosted a Houston Oilers team missing running back Earl Campbell and quarterback Dan Pastorini and fell on their faces. Fouts threw five interceptions and no touchdowns, and the Chargers blew a third quarter lead and lost 17–14. The Chargers would not have the best record in the NFL again until the 2006 season. They would not have another top ten defense in points allowed until 1989. They would not win 12 games in a season until 2004. Their best shot at glory went horribly awry, thanks to the worst game in the illustrious career of Dan Fouts."

== Offseason ==
=== NFL draft ===
1979 San Diego Chargers draft
Round	Pick	Player	Position	College	Notes
1	13	Kellen Winslow * ^{†}	Tight end	Missouri	From Cleveland
3	73	Cliff Thrift	Linebacker	East Central	
4	104	John Floyd	Wide receiver	Northeast Louisiana	
8	210	Wilbert Haslip	Running back	Hawaii	
9	237	Alvin Garrett	Wide receiver	Angelo State	
10	265	Tony Petruccio	Defensive tackle	Penn State	
10	269	Al Green	Defensive back	Louisiana State University	Joined the NBA's Phoenix Suns
11	295	David Rader	Quarterback	Tulsa	
12	321	Frank Duncan	Defensive back	San Francisco State	
Made roster † Pro Football Hall of Fame * Made at least one Pro Bowl during career

== Roster ==
1979 San Diego Chargers roster
Quarterbacks (QB): 14 Dan Fouts; 12 James Harris; 10 Cliff Olander; Running backs (RB): 37 Hank Bauer; 41 Bo Matthews; 26 Lydell Mitchell; 24 Artie Owens; 22 Mike Thomas; 40 Clarence Williams; 33 Don Woods; Wide receivers (WR): 87 Larry Burton; 86 John Floyd; 83 John Jefferson; 18 Charlie Joiner; Tight ends (TE): 84 Bob Klein; 88 Greg McCrary	Offensive linemen (OL): 60 Dan Audick G/T; 53 Ralph Perretta C; 56 Bob Rush C; 66 Billy Shields T; 70 Russ Washington T; 67 Ed White G; 63 Doug Wilkerson G; Defensive linemen (DL): 71 Fred Dean DE; 73 Charles DeJurnett DE/DT; 79 Gary Johnson DT; 68 Leroy Jones DE; 74 Louie Kelcher DT; 69 John Lee DE; 99 Wilbur Young DT	Linebackers (LB): 50 Don Goode OLB; 55 Bob Horn MLB; 57 Linden King OLB; 51 Woodrow Lowe OLB; 52 Ray Preston OLB; 59 Cliff Thrift MLB; Defensive backs (DB): 28 Willie Buchanon CB; 48 Jerome Dove CB; 27 Glen Edwards FS; 42 Mike Fuller SS; 44 Pete Shaw FS; 45 Hal Stringert CB/S; 29 Mike Williams CB; Special teams (ST): 8 Jeff West P; 16 Mike Wood K	Reserve: 6 Rolf Benirschke K (IR); 82 Pat Curran TE (IR); 47 Frank Duncan S (IR); 77 Milton Hardaway T (IR); 54 Jim Laslavic LB (IR); 62 Don Macek C (IR); 80 Kellen Winslow TE (IR); Rookies in italics

== Preseason ==
Week	Date	Opponent	Result	Record	Venue	Attendance
1	August 4	at San Francisco 49ers	L 10–13	0–1	Candlestick Park	32,275
2	August 11	Minnesota Vikings	W 19–0	1–1	San Diego Stadium	49,037
3	August 18	at New York Giants	W 7–3	2–1	Giants Stadium	22,341
4	August 25	at Los Angeles Rams	L 7–23	2–2	Los Angeles Memorial Coliseum	50,089

== Regular season ==
=== Schedule ===
Week	Date	Opponent	Result	Record	Venue	Attendance	Recap
1	September 2	at **Seattle Seahawks**	**W** 33–16	1–0	Kingdome	62,887	Recap
2	September 9	**Oakland Raiders**	**W** 30–10	2–0	San Diego Stadium	50,255	Recap
3	September 16	Buffalo Bills	**W** 27–19	3–0	San Diego Stadium	50,709	Recap
4	September 23	at New England Patriots	**L** 21–27	3–1	Schaefer Stadium	60,916	Recap
5	September 30	San Francisco 49ers	**W** 31–9	4–1	San Diego Stadium	50,893	Recap
6	October 7	at **Denver Broncos**	**L** 0–7	4–2	Mile High Stadium	74,997	Recap
7	October 14	**Seattle Seahawks**	**W** 20–10	5–2	San Diego Stadium	50,077	Recap
8	October 21	at Los Angeles Rams	**W** 40–16	6–2	Los Angeles Memorial Coliseum	64,245	Recap
9	October 25	at **Oakland Raiders**	**L** 22–45	6–3	Oakland–Alameda County Coliseum	53,709	Recap
10	November 4	at **Kansas City Chiefs**	**W** 20–14	7–3	Arrowhead Stadium	59,353	Recap
11	November 11	at Cincinnati Bengals	**W** 26–24	8–3	Riverfront Stadium	40,782	Recap
12	November 18	Pittsburgh Steelers	**W** 35–7	9–3	San Diego Stadium	51,910	Recap
13	November 25	**Kansas City Chiefs**	**W** 28–7	10–3	San Diego Stadium	50,078	Recap
14	December 2	Atlanta Falcons	**L** 26–28	10–4	San Diego Stadium	50,198	Recap
15	December 9	at New Orleans Saints	**W** 35–0	11–4	Louisiana Superdome	61,059	Recap
16	December 17	**Denver Broncos**	**W** 17–7	12–4	San Diego Stadium	51,906	Recap
Note: Intra-division opponents are in **bold** text.

=== Game summaries ===
==== Week 1: at Seattle Seahawks ====
Week One: San Diego Chargers at Seattle Seahawks – Game summary

Quarter	1	2	3	4	Total
**Chargers**	0	13	10	10	**33**
Seahawks	3	7	0	6	**16**

at Kingdome, Seattle, Washington

- Date: September 2
- Game time: 1:00 p.m. PDT
- Game weather: Dome
- Game attendance: 62,887
- Referee: Ben Dreith
- TV announcers (NBC): Sam Nover and Mike Haffner
- Box score

Game information

**First quarter**

- SEA – Efren Herrera 34-yard field goal, 8:26. Seahawks 3–0. **Drive: 10 plays, 50 yards, 3:46.**

**Second quarter**

- SDG – Clarence Williams 1-yard run (Rolf Benirschke kick), 14:56. Chargers 7–3. **Drive: 7 plays, 63 yards, 3:20.**
- SDG – Rolf Benirschke 31-yard field goal, 11:16. Chargers 10–3. **Drive: 4 plays, 0 yards, 1:52.**
- SEA – Sherman Smith 4-yard run (Efren Herrera kick), 4:51. Tied 10–10. **Drive: 11 plays, 72 yards, 6:25.**
- SDG – Rolf Benirschke 42-yard field goal, 0:28. Chargers 13–10. **Drive: 10 plays, 36 yards, 4:23.**

**Third quarter**

- SDG – Rolf Benirschke 22-yard field goal, 3:41. Chargers 16–10. **Drive: 5 plays, 29 yards, 1:36.**
- SDG – Clarence Williams 13-yard run (Rolf Benirschke kick), 0:00. Chargers 23–10. **Drive: 7 plays, 35 yards, 3:25.**

**Fourth quarter**

- SDG – Mike Thomas 8-yard run (Rolf Benirschke kick), 5:09. Chargers 30–10. **Drive: 3 plays, 34 yards, 1:34.**
- SDG – Rolf Benirschke 23-yard field goal, 1:56. Chargers 33–10. **Drive: 4 plays, 4 yards, 1:57.**
- SEA – Sherman Smith 6-yard run (kick blocked), 0:24. Chargers 33–16. **Drive: 7 plays, 70 yards, 1:24.**

**Top passers**

- SDG – Dan Fouts – 21/30, 224 yards, INT
- SEA – Jim Zorn – 16/28, 153 yards, 3 INT

**Top rushers**

- SDG – Clarence Williams – 14 rushes, 73 yards, 2 TD
- SEA – Sherman Smith – 18 rushes, 95 yards, 2 TD

**Top receivers**

- SDG – Artie Owens – 4 receptions, 42 yards
- SEA – Steve Largent – 2 receptions, 45 yards

Seattle led through an early field goal when John Jefferson caught a 25-yard pass to the Seahawks 1-yard line on the final play of the opening quarter. He fumbled the ball into the end zone but was ruled down by contact before losing possession. San Diego kept the ball, and Williams opened the second quarter with his first touchdown run. Three plays later, Fred Dean recovered a fumble by Seattle quarterback Jim Zorn at the Seahawks 12-yard line. San Diego's offense were unable to advance the ball, but Rolf Benirschke's first field goal extended their lead. Seattle tied the score with a 72-yard touchdown drive, then Winslow's 20-yard reception was the longest play as San Diego moved in range for Benirschke's 42-yard kick shortly before halftime, putting them 13–10 up.

Starting from midway through the 3rd quarter, the Seahawks had a string of five consecutive possessions that ended in turnovers. Firstly, Dean's second fumble recovery set up San Diego at the Seattle 32. Fouts threw a 24-yard pass to Joiner on the next play, and Benirschke soon added a third field goal. Zorn was intercepted by Ray Preston on the following play from scrimmage and Williams had carries of 17 and 13 yards, the latter for another touchdown. Seattle drove from their own 26-yard line to a 4th and 3 at the Chargers 9, but a Pete Shaw interception ended the threat. A fumble recovery by Wilbur Young at the Seattle 34-yard line was followed by runs of 4, 22 and 8 yards by Williams, Bo Matthews and Mike Thomas respectively, the latter for a touchdown. Preston's second interception led to Benirschke's final field goal.

San Diego barely outgained Seattle (356 yards to 334) and gave up more penalty yardage (110 to 40), but forced six of the game's seven turnovers.

==== Week 2: vs. Oakland Raiders ====
Week Two: Oakland Raiders at San Diego Chargers – Game summary

Quarter	1	2	3	4	Total
Raiders	0	3	7	0	**10**
**Chargers**	14	7	2	7	**30**

at San Diego Stadium, San Diego, California

- Date: September 9
- Game time: 1:00 p.m. PDT
- Game weather: 73 °F (22.8 °C) relative humidity 82%, wind 9 miles per hour (14 km/h; 7.8 kn)
- Game attendance: 50,255
- Referee: Bob Frederic
- TV announcers (NBC): Jim Simpson and John Brodie
- Box score

Game information

**First quarter**

- SDG – John Jefferson 24-yard pass from Dan Fouts (Rolf Benirschke kick), 9:22. Chargers 7–0. **Drive: 8 plays, 65 yards, 4:01.**
- SDG – Bob Klein 54-yard pass from Dan Fouts (Rolf Benirschke kick), 1:51. Chargers 14–0. **Drive: 3 plays, 61 yards, 0:52.**

**Second quarter**

- OAK – Jim Breech 35-yard field goal, 14:14. Chargers 14–3. **Drive: 5 plays, 22 yards, 2:24.**
- SDG – Woodrow Lowe 32-yard interception return (Rolf Benirschke kick), 7:17. Chargers 21–3.

**Third quarter**

- OAK – Rich Martini 22-yard pass from Ken Stabler (Jim Breech kick), 11:07. Chargers 21–10. **Drive: 6 plays, 60 yards, 2:13.**
- SDG – Safety, Greg McCrary blocked punt out of end zone, 2:19. Chargers 23–10.

**Fourth quarter**

- SDG – Kellen Winslow 5-yard pass from Dan Fouts (Cliff Olander kick), 11:00. Chargers 30–10. **Drive: 7 plays, 36 yards, 3:50.**

**Top passers**

- OAK – Ken Stabler – 17/34, 183 yards, TD, 2 INT
- SDG – Dan Fouts – 15/30, 216 yards, 3 TD

**Top rushers**

- OAK – Arthur Whittington – 10 rushes, 40 yards
- SDG – Mike Thomas – 7 rushes, 49 yards

**Top receivers**

- OAK – Raymond Chester – 7 receptions, 91 yards
- SDG – John Jefferson – 5 receptions, 76 yards, TD

The first time they had the ball, San Diego drove 65 yards to Jefferson's touchdown catch without facing a third down. Later in the 1st quarter, Mike Fuller's 17-yard punt return started San Diego off at their own 39-yard line. Two plays later they faced a 3rd and 3; Fouts found Bob Klein open at the Oakland 30 and he completed a 54-yard touchdown. Oakland responded with a field goal, then the Chargers missed a scoring opportunity Fouts fumbled the snap on a 1st and 10 from the Oakland 19-yard line. Woodrow Lowe intercepted a Ken Stabler pass three plays later and ran it back 32 yards for another touchdown. Glen Edwards stopped a Raiders drive with another interception. In the final minutes of the half, Oakland moved from their own 17-yard line to a 4th and 1 from the San Diego 3. They kept their offense on the field, but Preston and Ray Buchanan stuffed Stabler for no gain as time expired, leaving the Chargers 21–3 ahead.

Oakland scored a touchdown on their first possession of the second half, then Fouts lost another snap near midfield. Later, Jeff West pinned the Raiders at their own 2-yard line with a 33-yard punt, and the San Diego defense forced Oakland to go three-and-out. That led to a Chargers safety when Greg McCrary blocked a Ray Guy punt out of the end zone. On Oaklands next drive, Charles DeJurnett sacked Stabler at his own 1-yard line; the Raiders punted from there and San Diego only had to drive 36 yards to Winslow's touchdown on 3rd and 5 from the 6-yard line. Oakland were inside San Diego territory, on their final three drives, but turned the ball over on downs each time.

There were again numerous turnovers, with three by each team. The game featured the first career touchdowns of both Lowe and Winslow.

==== Week 3: vs. Buffalo Bills ====
Week Three: Buffalo Bills at San Diego Chargers – Game summary

Quarter	1	2	3	4	Total
Bills	6	6	7	0	**19**
**Chargers**	7	6	7	7	**27**

at San Diego Stadium, San Diego, California

- Date: September 16
- Game time: 1:00 p.m. PDT
- Game weather: 79 °F (26.1 °C) relative humidity 64%, wind 8 miles per hour (13 km/h; 7.0 kn)
- Game attendance: 50,709
- Referee: Fred Silva
- TV announcers (NBC): Merle Harmon and George Kunz
- Box score

Game information

**First quarter**

- BUF – Frank Lewis 21-yard pass from Joe Ferguson (kick failed), 9:44. Bills 6–0. **Drive: 5 plays, 40 yards, 2:20.**
- SDG – Clarence Williams 5-yard run (Rolf Benirschke kick), 4:46. Chargers 7–6. **Drive: 8 plays, 80 yards, 4:58.**

**Second quarter**

- SDG – Clarence Williams 1-yard run (kick blocked), 13:26. Chargers 13–6. **Drive: 9 plays, 73 yards, 4:35.**
- BUF – Joe Ferguson 10-yard run (kick failed), 0:04. Chargers 13–12. **Drive: 15 plays, 80 yards, 9:14.**

**Third quarter**

- BUF – Curtis Brown 84-yard pass from Joe Ferguson (Tom Dempsey kick), 9:27. Bills 19–13. **Drive: 2 plays, 85 yards, 1:04.**
- SDG – Clarence Williams 55-yard run (Rolf Benirschke kick), 8:25. Chargers 20–19. **Drive: 2 plays, 64 yards, 1:02.**

**Fourth quarter**

- SDG – Clarence Williams 2-yard run (Rolf Benirschke kick), 11:14. Chargers 27–19. **Drive: 8 plays, 80 yards, 4:52.**

**Top passers**

- BUF – Joe Ferguson – 16/29, 257 yards, 2 TD
- SDG – Dan Fouts – 8/13, 100 yards

**Top rushers**

- BUF – Terry Miller – 8 rushes, 26 yards
- SDG – Clarence Williams – 18 rushes, 157 yards, 4 TD

**Top receivers**

- BUF – Curtis Brown – 8 receptions, 157 yards, TD
- SDG – Mike Thomas – 2 receptions, 53 yards

Buffalo scored the game's opening touchdown five plays after Mike Fuller fumbled a punt return in his own territory. San Diego ran on seven out of eight plays on the ensuing possession; Thomas began the drive with a 21-yard gain, while Williams had carries of 17 and 5 yards, the latter for the touchdown. After forcing a three-and-out, they ran the ball nine times in a row, with Williams having two 14-yard runs to set up his 1-yard touchdown. The Bills converted four 3rd downs on a drive that took 9:14 off the clock and culminated in a touchdown 4 seconds before halftime. With Benirschke having had one of his extra point attempts blocked and the Bills having missed both of theirs, San Diego were 13–12 ahead at the interval.

Buffalo briefly took the lead in the 3rd quarter when running back Curtis Brown took a short pass 84 yards for a touchdown. Williams responded two plays later, breaking up the left sideline for a 55-yard touchdown. The Bills drove to the San Diego 35-yard line, but were pushed back by a penalty and a Johnson sack, eventually punting. San Diego took over on their own 20, and Fouts combined Thomas for gains of 26 and 27 yards on the drive to Williams' 2-yard touchdown. Buffalo failed to cross the Chargers 40-yard line in the final quarter.

Williams was the first Charger to rush for four touchdowns in a game; as of 2025, it remains tied for the most in franchise history. As a team, the Chargers had 245 rushing yards and only 94 passing yards; it was the only time all season that they rushed for more yardage than they passed.

==== Week 4: at New England Patriots ====
Week Four: San Diego Chargers at New England Patriots – Game summary

Quarter	1	2	3	4	Total
Chargers	0	14	0	7	**21**
**Patriots**	17	3	0	7	**27**

at Schaefer Stadium, Foxborough, Massachusetts

- Date: September 23
- Game time: 1:00 p.m. EDT
- Game weather: 55 °F (12.8 °C) relative humidity 72%, wind 14 miles per hour (23 km/h; 12 kn)
- Game attendance: 60,916
- Referee: Fred Wyant
- TV announcers (NBC): Dick Enberg and Merlin Olsen
- Box score

Game information

**First quarter**

- NE – Sam Cunningham 1-yard run (John Smith kick), 11:01. Patriots 7–0. **Drive: 5 plays, 34 yards, 2:46.**
- NE – Don Calhoun 10-yard run (John Smith kick), 4:48. Patriots 14–0. **Drive: 9 plays, 47 yards, 4:52.**
- NE – John Smith 31-yard field goal, 0:30. Patriots 17–0. **Drive: 6 plays, 22 yards, 2:43.**

**Second quarter**

- NE – John Smith 31-yard field goal, 6:45. Patriots 20–0. **Drive: 8 plays, 56 yards, 3:46.**
- SDG – John Jefferson 19-yard pass from Dan Fouts (Rolf Benirschke kick), 4:19. Patriots 20–7. **Drive: 4 plays, 65 yards, 2:26.**
- SDG – Clarence Williams 1-yard run (Rolf Benirschke kick), 0:06. Patriots 20–14. **Drive: 6 plays, 38 yards, 2:12.**

**Third quarter**

- No scoring plays.

**Fourth quarter**

- NE – Russ Francis 5-yard pass from Steve Grogan (John Smith kick), 14:07. Patriots 27–14. **Drive: 10 plays, 64 yards, 3:47.**
- SDG – Clarence Williams 1-yard run (Rolf Benirschke kick), 4:09. Patriots 27–21. **Drive: 6 plays, 36 yards, 2:16.**

**Top passers**

- SDG – Dan Fouts – 20/34, 200 yards, TD, 2 INT
- NE – Steve Grogan – 13/23, 157 yards, TD, 2 INT

**Top rushers**

- SDG – Clarence Williams – 13 rushes, 34 yards, 2 TD
- NE – Sam Cunningham – 22 rushes, 75 yards, TD

**Top receivers**

- SDG – John Jefferson – 4 receptions, 59 yards, TD
- NE – Russ Francis – 4 receptions, 85 yards, TD

San Diego went three-and-out on all three of their 1st quarter possessions. Punting into a strong wind, West had kicks of 21, 28 and 30 yards, setting up New England in Chargers territory on three consecutive drives; they converted these opportunities into seventeen points. New England added a further field goal in the 2nd quarter and led 20–0 before the Chargers began their comeback. Fouts finished the following drive by hitting Jefferson for gains of 33 and 19 yards on successive plays, the latter for a touchdown. New England faced the wind in the 2nd quarter, and they shanked a punt for only 18 yards to set San Diego up at the Patriots 38-yard line. Fouts and Joiner combined for 8 yards on a 3rd and 5, and Williams scored six seconds before halftime to cut the deficit to 20–14.

San Diego had the wind at their backs again in the 3rd quarter, but ran only seven plays from scrimmage during a scoreless period. Early in the 4th quarter, Steve Grogan's touchdown pass made it 27–14. With seven minutes to play, Glen Edwards intercepted Grogan in Patriots territory. Williams ran for 13 yards on a 3rd and 2 and again scored from a yard out to draw the Chargers back within six points. Facing a 3rd and 12 on the first play after the two-minute warning, Grogan threw the ball directly to Bob Horn, who returned it 30 yards to the New England 10-yard line. Two plays netted only a single yard, and Fouts was intercepted at the goal line on 3rd down with 1:28 to play; he had Jefferson open, but misread the defense. New England gained a first down and were able to run the clock out.

Despite Williams' two scores, the Chargers' rushing attack could muster only 39 yards total, their worst tally of the season. Thomas gained no yards on his two carries but caught two passes for 46 yards and also threw an 18-yard completion.

==== Week 5: vs. San Francisco 49ers ====
Week Five: San Francisco 49ers at San Diego Chargers – Game summary

Quarter	1	2	3	4	Total
49ers	0	3	6	0	**9**
**Chargers**	0	17	0	14	**31**

at San Diego Stadium, San Diego, California

- Date: September 30
- Game time: 1:00 p.m. PDT
- Game weather: 72 °F (22.2 °C) relative humidity 69%, wind 11 miles per hour (18 km/h; 9.6 kn)
- Game attendance: 50,893
- Referee: Gene Barth
- TV announcers (CBS): Dick Stockton and George Allen
- Box score

Game information

**First quarter**

- No scoring plays.

**Second quarter**

- SF – Ray Wersching 32-yard field goal, 11:39. 49ers 3–0. **Drive: 13 plays, 80 yards, 6:33.**
- SDG – Clarence Williams 3-yard run (Roy Gerela kick), 5:04. Chargers 7–3. **Drive: 11 plays, 68 yards, 6:35.**
- SDG – Roy Gerela 26-yard field goal, 0:42. Chargers 10–3. **Drive: 11 plays, 41 yards, 3:18.**
- SDG – Charlie Joiner 24-yard pass from Dan Fouts (Roy Gerela kick), 0:05. Chargers 17–3. **Drive: 1 play, 24 yards, 0:06.**

**Third quarter**

- SF – O. J. Simpson 1-yard run (kick blocked), 9:06. Chargers 17–9. **Drive: 6 plays, 71 yards, 2:39.**

**Fourth quarter**

- SDG – Kellen Winslow 24-yard pass from Dan Fouts (Roy Gerela kick), 9:58. Chargers 24–9. **Drive: 10 plays, 69 yards, 5:32.**
- SDG – Hank Bauer 1-yard run (Roy Gerela kick), 0:08. Chargers 31–9. **Drive: 3 plays, 4 yards, 1:27.**

**Top passers**

- SF – Steve DeBerg – 13/23, 147 yards, 2 INT
- SDG – Dan Fouts – 26/34, 251 yards, 2 TD, INT

**Top rushers**

- SF – O. J. Simpson – 16 rushes, 89 yards, TD
- SDG – Clarence Williams – 14 rushes, 37 yards, TD

**Top receivers**

- SF – Paul Hofer – 3 receptions, 57 yards
- SDG – Kellen Winslow – 7 receptions, 72 yards, TD

Roy Gerela had a chance to put the Chargers ahead on the game's opening possession, but his 43-yard field goal try was blocked. San Francisco reached the Chargers' 41-yard line before being stopped by Lowe's interception; San Diego drove to the 49ers 25-yard line before Fouts was also intercepted. The 49ers opened the scoring with a field goal early in the 2nd quarter. In response, Fouts converted 3rd downs with passes to Thomas and Williams, the latter of whom put the Chargers ahead with his 3-yard touchdown run. San Diego added a field goal on their next drive, and the 49ers were at their own 29-yard line with 21 seconds to play in the half. Horn then intercepted Steve DeBerg and ran the ball back to the 24. Fouts found Joiner for a touchdown on the next play for a 17–3 lead.

When San Francisco scored a touchdown in the 3rd quarter, Johnson blocked the extra point to keep the Chargers two scores ahead. San Diego were at the 49ers 9-yard line later in the quarter, but Fouts lost a fumble. Artie Owens' 24-yard catch moved the Chargers across midfield on their next possession; the drive appeared to have ended with a missed 41-yard kick by Gerela, but a 49ers offside penalty gave San Diego a first down. Two plays later, Winslow took a short pass in for a 24-yard touchdown. Johnson recovered a late fumble and returned it 36 yards to the San Francisco 4, allowing Hank Bauer to score from close range with 8 seconds on the clock.

Williams' rushing touchdown was his ninth of the season, already tying Paul Lowe's club record after only five games. Owens had 6 rushes for 21 yards, 3 catches for 31 yards, and 3 kickoff returns for 87 yards.

==== Week 6: at Denver Broncos ====
Week Six: San Diego Chargers at Denver Broncos – Game summary

Quarter	1	2	3	4	Total
Chargers	0	0	0	0	**0**
**Broncos**	0	0	7	0	**7**

at Mile High Stadium, Denver, Colorado

- Date: October 7
- Game time: 1:00 p.m. MDT
- Game weather: 67 °F (19.4 °C) relative humidity 26%, wind 11 miles per hour (18 km/h; 9.6 kn)
- Game attendance: 74,997
- Referee: Red Cashion
- TV announcers (NBC): Sam Nover and Bob Trumpy
- Box score

Game information

**First quarter**

- No scoring plays.

**Second quarter**

- No scoring plays.

**Third quarter**

- DEN – Norris Weese 3-yard run (Jim Turner kick), 11:01. Broncos 7–0. **Drive: 2 plays, 11 yards, 0:51.**

**Fourth quarter**

- No scoring plays.

**Top passers**

- SDG – Dan Fouts – 27/45, 305 yards, 3 INT
- DEN – Norris Weese – 6/11, 35 yards

**Top rushers**

- SDG – Clarence Williams – 13 rushes, 29 yards
- DEN – Otis Armstrong – 9 rushes, 78 yards

**Top receivers**

- SDG – Charlie Joiner – 7 receptions, 115 yards
- DEN – Riley Odoms – 2 receptions, 29 yards

Neither side crossed midfield until early in the 2nd quarter, when Fouts' 30-yard pass to Winslow converted a 3rd and 3 and brought the Chargers to Denver's 22-yard line. The drive stalled near the goal line, and Gerela had a field goal blocked. A Denver offsides penalty let him try again, but he missed from 20 yards out. He had a longer chance on the next drive and struck the left upright from 45 yards out. Lowe recovered a fumble on the Denver 45-yard line, but the Chargers gained only seven yards before punting. Denver reached the San Diego 35 late in the half before Wilbur Young sacked Norris Weese to push them out of field goal range, and the half finished scoreless.

Winslow fumbled early in the 3rd quarter; Denver recovered and returned the ball to the Chargers 11-yard line. Their touchdown came two plays later. San Diego drove to around midfield on their next two drives, which ended with a punt and an interception. Joiner's 39-yard catch set up a 34-yard Gerela field goal, which struck the right upright for his third miss. In the final minutes, Joiner's 20-yard catch on 4th and 5 gave the Chargers a first down at the Denver 44, but Fouts was intercepted again on the following play. Young's fumble recovery gave San Diego's offense a last chance from their own 33-yard line, but Fouts threw his third interception two plays later.

Despite being shut out, the Chargers outgained Denver by 374 yards to 193, including a 305–33 advantage in passing yards. The result produced a three-way tie at the top of the AFC West, with the Chargers, Broncos and Chiefs all at 4–2.

==== Week 7: vs. Seattle Seahawks ====
Week Seven: Seattle Seahawks at San Diego Chargers – Game summary

Quarter	1	2	3	4	Total
Seahawks	0	3	0	7	**10**
**Chargers**	7	0	7	6	**20**

at San Diego Stadium, San Diego, California

- Date: October 14
- Game time: 1:00 p.m. PDT
- Game weather: 72 °F (22.2 °C) relative humidity 78%, wind 9 miles per hour (14 km/h; 7.8 kn)
- Game attendance: 50,077
- Referee: Chuck Heberling
- TV announcers (NBC): Merle Harmon and George Kunz
- Box score

Game information

**First quarter**

- SDG – Lydell Mitchell 20-yard pass from Dan Fouts (Roy Gerela kick), 6:56. Chargers 7–0. **Drive: 13 plays, 77 yards, 4:49.**

**Second quarter**

- SEA – Efren Herrera 19-yard field goal, 0:26. Chargers 7–3. **Drive: 12 plays, 70 yards, 3:26.**

**Third quarter**

- SDG – John Jefferson 9-yard pass from Dan Fouts (Roy Gerela kick), 3:11. Chargers 14–3. **Drive: 8 plays, 67 yards, 3:57.**

**Fourth quarter**

- SEA – Sherman Smith 8-yard run (Efren Herrera kick), 14:13. Chargers 14–10. **Drive: 9 plays, 70 yards, 3:58.**
- SDG – John Jefferson 9-yard pass from Dan Fouts (kick failed), 4:34. Chargers 20–10. **Drive: 3 plays, 54 yards, 1:26.**

**Top passers**

- SEA – Jim Zorn – 19/43, 192 yards, INT
- SDG – Dan Fouts – 28/35, 315 yards, 3 TD

**Top rushers**

- SEA – Sherman Smith – 13 rushes, 78 yards, TD
- SDG – Clarence Williams – 17 rushes, 45 yards

**Top receivers**

- SEA – Steve Largent – 2 receptions, 45 yards
- SDG – Dan Doornink – 8 receptions, 81 yards

San Diego went ahead to stay on their first drive of the game: Joiner had a 16-yard catch on 3rd and 2, Williams a 2-yard run on 4th and 1, and Fouts opened the scoring with his first touchdown pass. In the 2nd quarter, Owens' 20-yard run moved the Chargers into position for a field goal, missed by Gerela from 40 yards out. San Diego's defense kept the Seahawks out of the end zone after they had driven to a 1st and goal at the Chargers 5-yard line, leading to a 7–3 halftime lead.

A 65-yard Chargers drive to open the 3rd quarter led to no points after Gerela missed from 38 yards out. Seattle went three-and-out, and San Diego drove 67 yards for a touchdown: Fouts began the drive with a 26-yard pass to Bob Klein, and end it with a 9-yard touchdown to Jefferson on a 3rd and 5. Seattle answered with a touchdown early in the 4th quarter, then executed an onside kick but went three-and-out. The Seahawks gained a first down at the San Diego 27-yard line on their next drive, but Edwards intercepted Jim Zorn in the end zone. With six minutes left, Seattle tried a fake punt on 4th and 8 from the Chargers 45-yard line, but Shaw tackled the ball carrier for no gain. Two plays gained five yards, then Fouts found Jefferson for the clinching touchdown.

Jefferson had 137 receiving yards after gaining only 273 yards in the first six games combined. San Diego fumbled five times and the Seahawks twice: each time, the fumbling team retained possession.

==== Week 8: at Los Angeles Rams ====
Week Eight: San Diego Chargers at Los Angeles Rams – Game summary

Quarter	1	2	3	4	Total
**Chargers**	7	7	17	9	**40**
Rams	7	0	0	9	**16**

at Los Angeles Memorial Coliseum, Los Angeles, California

- Date: October 21
- Game time: 1:00 p.m. PDT
- Game weather: 63 °F (17.2 °C) relative humidity 55%, wind 14 miles per hour (23 km/h; 12 kn)
- Game attendance: 64,245
- Referee: Gordon McCarter
- TV announcers (NBC): Dick Enberg and Merlin Olsen
- Box score

Game information

**First quarter**

- SDG – Hank Bauer 1-yard run (Mike Wood kick), 7:59. Chargers 7–0. **Drive: 7 plays, 48 yards, 4:08.**
- RAM – Wendell Tyler 3-yard run (Frank Corral kick), 1:00. Tied 7–7. **Drive: 5 plays, 80 yards, 2:28.**

**Second quarter**

- SDG – John Jefferson 65-yard pass from Dan Fouts (Mike Wood kick), 0:56. Chargers 14–7. **Drive: 3 plays, 70 yards, 0:46.**

**Third quarter**

- SDG – Wilbur Young 3-yard defensive fumble return (Mike Wood kick), 13:41. Chargers 21–7.
- SDG – Mike Wood 37-yard field goal, 6:26. Chargers 24–7. **Drive: 7 plays, 11 yards, 2:19.**
- SDG – Bob Klein 6-yard pass from Dan Fouts (Mike Wood kick), 1:42. Chargers 31–7. **Drive: 5 plays, 55 yards, 2:32.**

**Fourth quarter**

- RAM – Preston Dennard 31-yard pass from Pat Haden (Frank Corral kick, 14:45. Chargers 31–14. **Drive: 7 plays, 69 yards, 1:57.**
- SDG – Mike Wood 31-yard field goal, 11:36. Chargers 34–14. **Drive: 5 plays, 47 yards, 3:02.**
- SDG – Hank Bauer 1-yard run, 4:33. Chargers 40–14. **Drive: 1 play, 1 yard, 0:03.**
- RAM – Safety, Jeff West stepped out of end zone, 0:53. Chargers 40–16.

**Top passers**

- SDG – Dan Fouts – 17/32, 326 yards, 2 TD, 2 INT
- RAM – Pat Haden – 17/30, 248 yards, TD, 3 INT

**Top rushers**

- SDG – Lydell Mitchell – 12 rushes, 48 yards
- RAM – Wendell Tyler – 20 rushes, 79 yards, TD

**Top receivers**

- SDG – Charlie Joiner – 7 receptions, 168 yards
- RAM – Elvis Peacock – 5 receptions, 97 yards

The Chargers scored on their second possession: Joiner's 26-yard catch on 3rd and 3 moved the ball to the Rams 15-yard line, Jefferson drew pass interference in the end zone on 3rd and 2, and Bauer scored from a yard out. Joiner added a 35-yard catch on San Diego's next drive, but Fouts was intercepted on a 2nd and 12 from the Los Angeles 21-yard line. Mike Williams was flagged for a 37-yard pass interference penalty soon afterwards, and the Rams tied the score two plays later. They were poised to take the lead in the 2nd quarter, but Lowe blocked a 42-yard field goal attempt. The Chargers went ahead to stay with 56 seconds to play in the half: Fouts found Jefferson at the Rams 36 and he went in for a 65-yard touchdown and 14–7 half time lead.

Shortly after half time, Dean's sack caused the ball to pop into the air for Young to gather as he stepped into the end zone. A Shaw interception and 30-yard return set up a field goal for Mike Wood. Soon afterwards, Shaw forced a fumble which Jerome Dove recovered at the San Diego 45. Fouts connected with Joiner for 33-yards on the following drive, and found Klein for a touchdown on the next play. After a Rams touchdown, Jefferson had a 40-yard catch to set up another field goal. The Rams reached the San Diego 2-yard line, Lowe ended that threat by forcing a fumble which went through the end zone. Williams later set up a second Bauer touchdown when he ran an interception back 50 yards to the 1-yard line.

A loss by Denver the next day left the Chargers a game clear in the division. The Chargers had two 100-yard receivers: Joiner caught 7 passes for 168 yards, while Jefferson added 3 catches for 112 yards and a touchdown. Fuller had two of the Chargers' four interceptions; they forced eight of the game's ten takeaways.

==== Week 9: at Oakland Raiders ====
Week Nine: San Diego Chargers at Oakland Raiders – Game summary

Quarter	1	2	3	4	Total
Chargers	0	6	16	0	**22**
**Raiders**	14	10	7	14	**45**

at Oakland-Alameda County Coliseum, Oakland, California

- Date: October 25
- Game time: 6:00 p.m. PDT
- Game weather: 66 °F (18.9 °C) relative humidity 79%, wind 17 miles per hour (27 km/h; 15 kn)
- Game attendance: 53,709
- Referee: Ben Dreith
- TV announcers (ABC): Frank Gifford, Fran Tarkenton and Howard Cosell
- Box score

Game information

**First quarter**

- OAK – Raymond Chester 34-yard pass from Ken Stabler (Jim Breech kick), 9:28. Raiders 7–0. **Drive: 4 plays, 41 yards, 2:03.**
- OAK – Booker Russell 1-yard run (Jim Breech kick), 6:28. Raiders 14–0. **Drive: 4 plays, 40 yards, 1:20.**

**Second quarter**

- OAK – Mark van Eeghen 4-yard run (Jim Breech kick), 6:54. Raiders 21–0. **Drive: 12 plays, 80 yards, 6:32.**
- SDG – John Jefferson 57-yard pass from Dan Fouts (kick blocked), 1:46. Raiders 21–6. **Drive: 4 plays, 86 yards, 0:47.**
- OAK – Jim Breech 38-yard field goal, 0:23. Raiders 24–6. **Drive: 7 plays, 46 yards, 1:16.**

**Third quarter**

- SDG – Mike Wood 28-yard field goal, 10:15. Raiders 24–9. **Drive: 9 plays, 46 yards, 4:45.**
- SDG – Dan Fouts 1-yard run (kick failed), 7:24. Raiders 24–15. **Drive: 10 plays, 65 yards, 4:45.**
- OAK – Ira Matthews 104-yard kickoff return (Jim Breech kick), 7:04. Raiders 31–15.
- SDG – Bob Klein 7-yard pass from Dan Fouts (Mike Wood kick), 0:48. Raiders 31–22. **Drive: 6 plays, 37 yards, 2:11.**

**Fourth quarter**

- OAK – Booker Russell 1-yard run (Jim Breech kick), 8:40. Raiders 38–22. **Drive: 5 plays, 62 yards, 3:13.**
- OAK – Booker Russell 1-yard run (Jim Breech kick), 11:23. Raiders 45–22. **Drive: 5 plays, 19 yards, 2:57.**

**Top passers**

- SDG – Dan Fouts – 21/37, 303 yards, 2 TD, 2 INT
- OAK – Ken Stabler – 13/17, 212 yards, TD

**Top rushers**

- SDG – Clarence Williams – 7 rushes, 40 yards
- OAK – Mark van Eeghen – 22 rushes, 95 yards, TD

**Top receivers**

- SDG – John Jefferson – 4 receptions, 109 yards, TD
- OAK – Dave Casper – 3 receptions, 88 yards

Oakland scored touchdowns on their second and third possessions, while the Chargers opened with a pair of three-and-outs. They reached 1st and 5 at the 11-yard line in response, but Fouts was intercepted by Lester Hayes. An 80-yard touchdown increased the Raiders' lead to twenty-one points before San Diego scored on Jefferson's 57-yard touchdown reception. The extra point was blocked, and Oakland increased their lead to 24–6 with a field goal shortly before halftime.

Wood made a short field goal on the opening possession of the 3rd quarter, then followed up with a surprise onside kick, which San Diego recovered. On the ensuing possession, Joiner had a 25-yard catch, Jefferson converted a 4th and 4, and Fouts ran the ball in himself with a quarterback sneak from a yard out. Wood missed the exter point, and Ira Matthews returned the ensuing kickoff 104 yards for a touchdown. Klein pulled San Diego back within nine points with a quarter still to play, but they didn't cross midfield again until the final minutes, by which time Oakland had safely padded their lead with two touchdowns either side of a Fouts interception. Chargers backup quarterback James Harris was also intercepted, his coming in the end zone in the final minute.

Denver won later in the week to move back into a first-placed tie with the Chargers. Fouts fourth consecutive 300-yard game set an NFL record at the time. For the second consecutive game, both starting wide receivers crossed the 100-yard mark: Joiner caught 9 passes for 107 yards while Jefferson had 4 for 109 and a touchdown.

==== Week 10: at Kansas City Chiefs ====
Week Ten: San Diego Chargers at Kansas City Chiefs – Game summary

Quarter	1	2	3	4	Total
**Chargers**	10	0	3	7	**20**
Chiefs	0	0	0	14	**14**

at Arrowhead Stadium, Kansas City, Missouri

- Date: November 4
- Game time: 1:00 p.m. CST
- Game weather: 47 °F (8.3 °C) relative humidity 45%, wind 16 miles per hour (26 km/h; 14 kn)
- Game attendance: 59,353
- Referee: Jim Tunney
- TV announcers (NBC): Jay Randolph and Paul Maguire
- Box score

Game information

**First quarter**

- SDG – John Jefferson 13-yard pass from Dan Fouts (Mike Wood kick), 11:21. Chargers 7–0. **Drive: 10 plays, 54 yards, 2:34.**
- SDG – Mike Wood 31-yard field goal, 2:59. Chargers 10–0. **Drive: 12 plays, 71 yards, 6:37.**

**Second quarter**

- No scoring plays.

**Third quarter**

- SDG – Mike Wood 26-yard field goal, 3:03. Chargers 13–0. **Drive: 14 plays, 58 yards, 7:32.**

**Fourth quarter**

- KAN – Steve Fuller 18-yard run (Jan Stenerud kick), 14:06. Chargers 13–7. **Drive: 8 plays, 80 yards, 3:57.**
- SDG – Clarence Williams 5-yard run (Mike Wood kick), 5:45. Chargers 20–7. **Drive: 14 plays, 73 yards, 8:21.**
- KAN – J. T. Smith 24-yard pass from Steve Fuller (Jan Stenerud kick), 3:05. Chargers 20–14. **Drive: 7 plays, 73 yards, 2:40.**

**Top passers**

- SDG – Dan Fouts – 28/44, 236 yards, TD, 2 INT
- KAN – Steve Fuller – 15/26, 170 yards, TD, 2 INT

**Top rushers**

- SDG – Lydell Mitchell – 13 rushes, 43 yards
- KAN – Tony Reed – 11 rushes, 47 yards

**Top receivers**

- SDG – John Jefferson – 6 receptions, 56 yards, TD
- KAN – J. T. Smith – 4 receptions, 56 yards, TD

There were three turnovers in the opening 65 seconds of the game: Edwards recovered a fumble on the opening kickoff, Fouts was intercepted two plays later, and Edwards recovered a second fumble on Kansas City's first play from scrimmage. The ensuing Chargers drive was extended when the Chiefs were flagged for running into the punter, and ended with Jefferson's 13-yard touchdown on 3rd and 7. On the next two drives, Wood made a 31-yard field goal and Kansas City kicker Jan Stenerud missed a 44-yarder. The next five drives resulted in punts, and San Diego led 10–0 at halftime.

Fouts threw another interception two plays into the 3rd quarter; Kansas City drove to the San Diego 17-yard line before Preston made an interception of his own to end the threat. The Chargers then embarked on a field goal drive: Wood missed from 21 yards out, but was given a second chance because the Chargers had been flagged for delay of game, and converted from 26 yards. Kansas City scored their first touchdown on the next drive. San Diego responded by driving 73 yards in 14 plays; Joiner had a 6-yard catch on 3rd and 3, and Williams scored on 3rd and 2 from the 5-yard line. The Chiefs produced their second consecutive touchdown drive, then forced a punt. Taking over on their own 30-yard line with 90 seconds left, Kansas City were at midfield when Edwards produced his third turnover of the game, this one a clinching interception with 41 seconds left.

Kansas City's late touchdown drives of 80 and 73 yards accounted for more than half of their 283 total yards. San Diego ran 75 total plays compared to the Chiefs' 53.

==== Week 11: at Cincinnati Bengals ====
Week Eleven: San Diego Chargers at Cincinnati Bengals – Game summary

Quarter	1	2	3	4	Total
**Chargers**	0	13	3	10	**26**
Bengals	14	0	0	10	**24**

at Riverfront Stadium, Cincinnati, Ohio

- Date: November 11
- Game time: 1:00 p.m. EST
- Game weather: 35 °F (1.7 °C) relative humidity 78%, wind 11 miles per hour (18 km/h; 9.6 kn), wind chill 27 °F (−2.8 °C)
- Game attendance: 40,782
- Referee: Jerry Seeman
- TV announcers (NBC): Phil Stone and Paul Maguire
- Box score

Game information

**First quarter**

- CIN – Pete Johnson 1-yard run (Chris Bahr kick), 10:39. Bengals 7–0. **Drive: 8 plays, 67 yards, 4:21.**
- CIN – Ray Griffin 96-yard interception return (Chris Bahr kick), 3:43. Bengals 14–0.

**Second quarter**

- SDG – Mike Wood 22-yard field goal, 11:14. Bengals 14–3. **Drive: 7 plays, 51 yards, 3:41.**
- SDG – Charlie Joiner 4-yard pass from Dan Fouts (Mike Wood kick), 7:17. Bengals 14–10. **Drive: 7 plays, 28 yards, 2:31.**
- SDG – Mike Wood 42-yard field goal, 0:47. Bengals 14–13. **Drive: 6 plays, 37 yards, 1:18.**

**Third quarter**

- SDG – Mike Wood 34-yard field goal, 11:06. Chargers 16–14. **Drive: 7 plays, 38 yards, 1:20.**

**Fourth quarter**

- CIN – Pete Johnson 2-yard run (Chris Bahr kick), 14:57. Bengals 21–16. **Drive: 11 plays, 48 yards, 4:21.**
- CIN – Chris Bahr 28-yard field goal, 4:34. Bengals 24–16. **Drive: 13 plays, 57 yards, 7:44.**
- SDG – Artie Owens 32-yard pass from Dan Fouts (Mike Wood kick), 3:13. Bengals 24–23. **Drive: 7 plays, 77 yards, 1:21.**
- SDG – Mike Wood 32-yard field goal, 0:19. Chargers 26–24. **Drive: 8 plays, 37 yards, 1:31.**

**Top passers**

- SDG – Dan Fouts – 21/40, 295 yards, 2 TD, 4 INT
- CIN – Ken Anderson – 9/22, 91 yards

**Top rushers**

- SDG – Lydell Mitchell – 6 rushes, 22 yards
- CIN – Archie Griffin – 15 rushes, 85 yards

**Top receivers**

- SDG – Charlie Joiner – 5 receptions, 99 yards, TD
- CIN – Don Bass – 4 receptions, 48 yards

Cincinnati took the opening kickoff and drove 67 yards on 8 plays for the opening touchdown. San Diego appeared poised to tie the scores later in the quarter after Cliff Thrift blocked a punt and set up the offense on the Bengals 8-yard line. Two plays later, Ray Griffin intercepted a Fouts throw and ran 96 yards untouched to double the lead. San Diego's first points came early in the 2nd quarter when a 32-yard Thomas catch set up Wood's first field goal. The Bengals were quickly forced to punt, and San Diego had to drive only 28 for Joiner's touchdown catch on 3rd and goal from the 4. John Floyd's 40-yard catch set up a second field goal late in the half, reducing the deficit to 14–13.

Joiner's 29-yard catch moved the Chargers into position for Wood's third field goal, which put them ahead for the first time. Later, the Bengals drove for a touchdown and a field goal either side of a Fouts interception, putting them eight points clear with only 4:32 on the clock. Fouts passed seven times in a row, completing on a 77-yard drive that culminated in a 32-yard touchdown for Owens with 3:13 still to play. After holding the Bengals to a three-and-out and benefitting from a 19-yard punt, the Chargers began the winning drive on their own 49 with 1:50 left. Following two incompletions and a sack, Fouts converted a 4th and 18 with a 31-yard completion to the uncovered Joiner, then found the same receiver for 13 yards on the next play. Three plays later, Wood kicked the winner from 32 yards out.

San Diego won despite committing all four of the game's turnovers. They gave up a season-high 194 yards on the ground, but allowed only 60 through the air.

==== Week 12: vs. Pittsburgh Steelers ====
Week Twelve: Pittsburgh Steelers at San Diego Chargers – Game summary

Quarter	1	2	3	4	Total
Steelers	0	0	7	0	**7**
**Chargers**	7	14	7	7	**35**

at San Diego Stadium, San Diego, California

- Date: November 18
- Game time: 1:00 p.m. PST
- Game weather: 63 °F (17.2 °C) relative humidity 78%, wind 9 miles per hour (14 km/h; 7.8 kn)
- Game attendance: 51,910
- Referee: Red Cashion
- TV announcers (NBC): Dick Enberg and Merlin Olsen
- Box score

Game information

**First quarter**

- SDG – John Jefferson 16-yard pass from Dan Fouts (Mike Wood kick), 8:33. Chargers 7–0. **Drive: 3 plays, 37 yards, 0:52.**

**Second quarter**

- SDG – Bob Klein 6-yard pass from Dan Fouts (Mike Wood kick), 6:29. Chargers 14–0. **Drive: 9 plays, 72 yards, 4:48.**
- SDG – Bo Matthews 2-yard run (Mike Wood kick), 4:37. Chargers 21–0. **Drive: 1 play, 2 yards, 0:04.**

**Third quarter**

- PIT – Rocky Bleier 2-yard run (Matt Bahr kick), 8:30. Chargers 21–7. **Drive: 8 plays, 30 yards, 3:29.**
- SDG – Woodrow Lowe 77-yard interception return (Mike Wood kick), 1:19. Chargers 28–7.

**Fourth quarter**

- SDG – Hank Bauer 2-yard run (Mike Wood kick), 5:53. Chargers 35–7. **Drive: 3 plays, 8 yards, 1:38.**

**Top passers**

- PIT – Terry Bradshaw – 18/36, 153 yards, 5 INT
- SDG – Dan Fouts – 11/24, 137 yards, 2 TD, 2 INT

**Top rushers**

- PIT – Franco Harris – 20 rushes, 44 yards
- SDG – Mike Thomas – 13 rushes, 53 yards

**Top receivers**

- PIT – John Stallworth – 4 receptions, 55 yards
- SDG – John Jefferson – 5 receptions, 106 yards, TD

The opening quarter featured seven turnovers, starting with a Preston interception of Terry Bradshaw and 25-yard return to the Steelers' 37-yard line. The Chargers needed only three plays to converted the opportunity into a Fouts-to-Jefferson touchdown. Pittsburgh fumbled the ensuing kickoff, but Fouts was intercepted in the end zone when he looked for Jefferson again. Following a Steelers punt, both sides lost fumbles in quick succession; Pittsburgh then touched a Charger punt, allowing San Diego to recover inside the ten. Three plays later, Fouts was intercepted again. In the 2dn quarter, Jefferson's 31-yard catch was the biggest play on a 72-yard drive that ended with Klein's touchdown. Four plays later, Bradshaw was intercepted by Preston again—he ran the ball back 35 yards and Williams scored from the 2-yard line a play later. That put the Chargers up 21–0, and they carried that lead into the second half.

In the 3rd quarter, Pittsburgh got on the scoreboard through Rocky Bleier and converted two 4th downs on their next drive. When Pittsburgh went for it again on 4th and 10 from the San Diego 37-yard line, Edwards deflected the ball for Lowe to intercept and return 77 yards for a touchdown. Johnson stopped two further 4th down conversion attempts with a sack and a tackle, and Mike Williams later set up a Bauer touchdown with an interception. Lowe claimed a further interception in the final minutes.

San Diego had five interceptions in total, four by linebackers. Jefferson gained 106 receiving yards while his teammates had 31 between them.

==== Week 13: vs. Kansas City Chiefs ====
Week Thirteen: Kansas City Chiefs at San Diego Chargers – Game summary

Quarter	1	2	3	4	Total
Chiefs	7	0	0	0	**7**
**Chargers**	7	7	7	7	**28**

at San Diego Stadium, San Diego, California

- Date: November 25
- Game time: 1:00 p.m. PST
- Game weather: 60 °F (15.6 °C) relative humidity 70%, wind 5 miles per hour (8.0 km/h; 4.3 kn)
- Game attendance: 50,078
- Referee: Bob Frederic
- TV announcers (NBC): Sam Nover and Bob Trumpy
- Box score

Game information

**First quarter**

- KAN – Mike Williams 8-yard pass from Steve Fuller (Jan Stenerud kick), 8:58. Chiefs 7–0. **Drive: 10 plays, 72 yards, 6:02.**
- SDG – Charlie Joiner 29-yard pass from Dan Fouts (Mike Wood kick), 4:20. Tied 7–7. **Drive: 8 plays, 65 yards, 4:38.**

**Second quarter**

- SDG – John Jefferson 42-yard pass from Dan Fouts (Mike Wood kick), 2:29. Chargers 14–7. **Drive: 8 plays, 91 yards, 3:48.**

**Third quarter**

- SDG – Bob Klein 8-yard pass from Dan Fouts (Mike Wood kick), 5:05. Chargers 21–7. **Drive: 14 plays, 82 yards, 6:26.**

**Fourth quarter**

- SDG – Artie Owens 8-yard run (Mike Wood kick), 8:11. Chargers 28–7. **Drive: 14 plays, 87 yards, 6:37.**

**Top passers**

- KAN – Steve Fuller – 14/22, 144 yards, TD, INT
- SDG – Dan Fouts – 27/43, 350 yards, 3 TD, INT

**Top rushers**

- KAN – Ted McKnight – 9 rushes, 24 yards
- SDG – Clarence Williams – 13 rushes, 63 yards

**Top receivers**

- KAN – Henry Marshall – 2 receptions, 43 yards
- SDG – Charlie Joiner – 9 receptions, 123 yards, TD

Kansas City's only points came on the game's opening possession after a 72-yard touchdown drive. Fouts twice faced difficult situations on the Chargers' first drive: he converted a 3rd and 18 with a 29-yard completion to Owens and a 3rd and 19 with a 29-yard touchdown to Joiner. The Chiefs started a drive at the San Diego 29-yard line after a Fouts interception, but were pushed back by a penalty and Young's 3rd-down sack, eventually punting. San Diego took the lead with a 91-yard touchdown drive—Bo Matthews had a 7-yard catch on 3rd and 5 and Jefferson caught Fouts' 42-yard touchdown at full stretch near the goal line. DeJurnett's 3rd-down sack stopped another Chiefs drive, and San Diego led 14–7 at halftime.

San Diego extended their lead with two 14-play touchdown drives. In the 3rd quarter, Fouts converted a trio of 3rd downs with completions to Clarence Williams, Joiner and Klein, the latter for a touchdown. In the final quarter, Joiner had another 3rd-down catch, Bauer converted on 3rd and 1 twice, and Owens scored the final touchdown. Kansas City, who had punted on seven consecutive possessions after their opening drive, reached the San Diego 9-yard line in the final minutes, but Mike Williams made an end zone interception.

The Chargers outgained Kansas City by 460 yards to 190, and gained 30 first downs to the Chiefs' 9. 249 of Fouts' 350 passing yards came in the first half. Denver lost to Oakland the same day, again leaving San Diego a game clear at the top of the AFC West.

==== Week 14: vs. Atlanta Falcons ====
Week Fourteen: Atlanta Falcons at San Diego Chargers – Game summary

Quarter	1	2	3	4	Total
**Falcons**	7	7	7	7	**28**
Chargers	7	3	7	9	**26**

at San Diego Stadium, San Diego, California

- Date: December 2
- Game time: 1:00 p.m. PST
- Game weather: 64 °F (17.8 °C) relative humidity 32%, wind 6 miles per hour (9.7 km/h; 5.2 kn)
- Game attendance: 50,198
- Referee: Gordon McCarter
- TV announcers (CBS): Frank Glieber and John Madden
- Box score

Game information

**First quarter**

- ATL – Haskel Stanback 1-yard run (Tim Mazzetti kick), 6:18. Falcons 7–0. **Drive: 7 plays, 43 yards, 3:35.**
- SDG – Hank Bauer 1-yard run (Mike Wood kick), 1:20. Tied 7–7. **Drive: 9 plays, 69 yards, 4:58.**

**Second quarter**

- SDG – Mike Wood 35-yard field goal, 13:01. Chargers 10–7. **Drive: 5 plays, 40 yards, 1:48.**
- ATL – William Andrews 11-yard pass from Steve Bartkowski (Tim Mazzetti kick), 1:52. Falcons 14–10. **Drive: 4 plays, 56 yards, 2:22.**

**Third quarter**

- SDG – John Floyd 19-yard pass from Dan Fouts (Mike Wood kick), 8:30. Chargers 17–14. **Drive: 6 plays, 50 yards, 2:24.**
- ATL – Wallace Francis 31-yard pass from Steve Bartkowski (Tim Mazzetti kick), 4:40. Falcons 21–17. **Drive: 8 plays, 80 yards, 3:50.**

**Fourth quarter**

- SDG – Clarence Williams 2-yard run (Mike Wood kick), 7:35. Chargers 24–21. **Drive: 5 plays, 64 yards, 3:14.**
- SDG – Safety, Wilbur Young sacked Steve Bartkowski in end zone, 4:39. Chargers 26–21.
- ATL – Wallace Francis 6-yard pass from Steve Bartkowski (Tim Mazzetti kick), 0:21. Falcons 28–26. **Drive: 9 plays, 51 yards, 1:44.**

**Top passers**

- ATL – Steve Bartkowski – 17/30, 225 yards, 3 TD, INT
- SDG – Dan Fouts – 28/37, 338 yards, TD, INT

**Top rushers**

- ATL – William Andrews – 21 rushes, 131 yards
- SDG – Dan Fouts – 5 rushes, 42 yards

**Top receivers**

- ATL – Wallace Francis – 6 receptions, 90 yards, 2 TD
- SDG – John Jefferson – 5 receptions, 103 yards

Thomas fumbled near midfield early in the game. Atlanta didn't take immediate advantage, but did open the scoring after an exchange of punts. The Chargers responded; Joiner had a 5-yard catch on 3rd and 3, then a 28-yard catch to the Atlanta 1-yard line to set up Bauer's touchdown two plays later. Jefferson's 43-yard reception led to a Wood field goal the next time San Diego had the ball. Falcons quarterback Steve Bartkowski moved his team 56 yards in only four plays shortly before halftime to put Atlanta back ahead. Fouts completed six out of seven passes to take San Diego from their own 25 to the Atlanta 14-yard line with 18 seconds on the clock, but was intercepted and the Falcons led 14–10 at halftime.

Atlanta moved into San Diego territory early in the second half, but Buchanon forced and recovered a fumble that he returned for 24 yards to midfield. Six plays later, Fouts threw a 19-yard touchdown to John Floyd on 3rd and 8. Bartkowski responded immediately, leading an 80-yard drive to put Atlanta back in front. Following an exchange of punts, Fouts scrambled for 26 yards, Joiner drew a 25-yard pass interference penalty Williams scored on a short run with 7:35 to play. Lowe intercepted Bartkowski and returned the ball to the Atlanta 33 shortly afterwards. San Diego were forced to punt, and West pinned Atlanta at their own 3-yard line, setting up a sack and safety for Young. San Diego then went three-and-out, and West shanked a 10-yard punt to the Atlanta 49. Bartkowski's game-winning touchdown pass came on a 3rd and goal with 21 seconds left. That still left time for a 27-yard reception by Jefferson, but the Chargers were pushed back five yards by an illegal motion penalty, and Wood's 53-yard field goal attempt fell short as time expired.

The result was a surprise, as Atlanta had entered the game with a 4–9 record compared to San Diego's 10–3. Jefferson and Joiner had 103 and 99 yards receiving yards respectively. Denver had won earlier, so the tie at the top of the division was restored.

==== Week 15: at New Orleans Saints ====
Week Fifteen: San Diego Chargers at New Orleans Saints – Game summary

Quarter	1	2	3	4	Total
**Chargers**	14	21	0	0	**35**
Saints	0	0	0	0	**0**

at Superdome, New Orleans, Louisiana

- Date: December 9
- Game time: 3:00 p.m. CST
- Game weather: Dome
- Game attendance: 61,059
- Referee: Ben Dreith
- TV announcers (NBC): Charlie Jones and Len Dawson
- Box score

Game information

**First quarter**

- SDG – Hank Bauer 1-yard run (Mike Wood kick), 8:34. Chargers 7–0. **Drive: 12 plays, 69 yards, 6:26.**
- SDG – Clarence Williams 5-yard run (Mike Wood kick), 3:09. Chargers 14–0. **Drive: 9 plays, 71 yards, 3:44.**

**Second quarter**

- SDG – John Jefferson 26-yard pass from Dan Fouts (Mike Wood kick), 10:58. Chargers 21–0. **Drive: 10 plays, 80 yards, 5:20.**
- SDG – Hank Bauer 1-yard run (Mike Wood kick), 1:18. Chargers 28–0. **Drive: 8 plays, 48 yards, 3:35.**
- SDG – Hank Bauer 1-yard run (Mike Wood kick), 0:00. Chargers 35–0. **Drive: 5 plays, 37 yards, 1:10.**

**Third quarter**

- No scoring plays.

**Fourth quarter**

- No scoring plays.

**Top passers**

- SDG – Dan Fouts – 17/23, 253 yards, TD
- NO – Archie Manning – 20/32, 185 yards

**Top rushers**

- SDG – Clarence Williams – 17 rushes, 88 yards, TD
- NO – Chuck Muncie – 10 rushes, 39 yards

**Top receivers**

- SDG – John Jefferson – 5 receptions, 104 yards, TD
- NO – Wes Chandler – 4 receptions, 51 yards

San Diego took the game's opening kickoff and drove 69 yards for the opening touchdown; Bauer's 1-yard touchdown converted the only 3rd down they faced. After the Saints missed a field goal, Jefferson had a 22-yard catch on 3rd and 3, and Williams scored three plays later. After the Saints went three-and-out, San Diego made it three touchdowns from three drives: Jefferson drew a 20-yard pass interference penalty on a 3rd and 19, and scored his touchdown on a 2nd and 21. New Orleans went three-and-out, then forced the Chargers to punt for the first time. Mike Fuller came up with an interception at the Saints 48-yard line on the next play. San Diego drove to another 3rd and goal from the 1-yard line, with Bauer scoring again. The Saints fumbled the ensuing kickoff, with Dove recovering. Jefferson had a 22-yard catch on 3rd and 15, and Chargers the 1-yard line with four seconds on the clock. They elected to run another play, and Bauer scored for the third time as the half ended. San Diego led 35–0, having gained 27 first downs to 1 and outgained the Saints by 323 yards to 45.

The Saints improved in the second half, but turned the ball over on downs three times in Chargers territory and once at midfield as they failed to prevent the shutout. The Chargers also came close to scoring, but Bauer was stopped on 4th and goal from the 15-yard line.

The Chargers rushed a season-high 42 times, covering 166 yards on the ground with four touchdowns. Bauer scored three times from a yard out, and lost two yards on his only other carry, giving him an unusual stat line: 4 carries, 1 yard, 3 touchdowns. San Diego clinched a playoff berth with the win. Denver lost, but could still win the division from the Chargers on the head-to-head tiebreaker by winning the following week's game between the teams.

==== Week 16: vs. Denver Broncos ====
Week Sixteen: Denver Broncos at San Diego Chargers – Game summary

Quarter	1	2	3	4	Total
Broncos	7	0	0	0	**7**
**Chargers**	0	7	7	3	**17**

at San Diego Stadium, San Diego, California

- Date: December 17
- Game time: 6:00 p.m. PST
- Game weather: 61 °F (16.1 °C) relative humidity 28%, wind 7 miles per hour (11 km/h; 6.1 kn)
- Game attendance: 51,906
- Referee: Chuck Heberling
- TV announcers (ABC): Howard Cosell, Don Meredith and Frank Gifford
- Box score

Game information

**First quarter**

- DEN – Otis Armstrong 3-yard run (Jim Turner kick), 7:19. Broncos 7–0. **Drive: 8 plays, 59 yards, 2:25.**

**Second quarter**

- SDG – Dan Fouts 4-yard run (Mike Wood kick), 11:07. Tied 7–7. **Drive: 5 plays, 41 yards, 2:54.**

**Third quarter**

- SDG – Charlie Joiner 32-yard pass from Dan Fouts (Mike Wood kick), 12:02. Chargers 10–7. **Drive: 3 plays, 52 yards, 0:50.**

**Fourth quarter**

- SDG – Mike Wood 24-yard field goal, 5:58. Chargers 17–7. **Drive: 6 plays, 19 yards, 3:14.**

**Top passers**

- DEN – Craig Morton – 27/41, 236 yards, 4 INT
- SDG – Dan Fouts – 17/29, 230 yards, TD, 3 INT

**Top rushers**

- DEN – Otis Armstrong – 13 rushes, 45 yards, TD
- SDG – Clarence Williams – 16 rushes, 50 yards

**Top receivers**

- DEN – Jim Jensen – 8 receptions, 65 yards
- SDG – Bob Klein – 4 receptions, 69 yards

Fouts was intercepted only four plays into the game that would decide the AFC West champions. There was an exchange of punts, then Denver drove 59 yards for their only points of the day. The Chargers missed their first scoring chance when Wood was short on a 51-yard field goal try. Three plays later, Dean forced a fumble that Jones recovered, setting the San Diego offense up at the Denver 41-yard line. Fouts found Klein for 20 yards on the next play, and finished the drive off himself when he followed Ed White's lead block and ran the ball in from the 4-yard line. Klein opened the next Chargers drive with a 22-yard catch; they gained a first down at the Denver 25-yard line, but Fouts was intercepted on the next play. Denver embarked on a 14-play, 81-yard drive that took them to a 2nd and 4 at the Chargers 9-yard line before Pete Shaw came up with a goal line interception 51 seconds before halftime. The teams went into the interval tied at 7–7.

Denver went three-and-out to start the second half, and San Diego needed only three plays to take the lead on Joiner's 32-yard touchdown catch. They had the chance to extend their lead shortly afterwards, but a botched hold prevented Wood from taking a 35-yard kick. Denver reached a 2nd and 7 at the San Diego 19-yard line early in the final quarter, but Don Goode came up with an interception. Long passes from Fouts and Morton were intercepted on the following two plays, with Mike Williams getting the Chargers' interception at his own 7-yard line. Following a punt, Fuller came up with San Diego's fourth interception and returned it to the Denver 25-yard line, leading to a short Wood field goal and a ten point lead with only 5:58 left. Denver reached a 4th and 6 at the Chargers 25 in response, but gained only 5 yards and turned the ball over on downs; San Diego ran out the last two minutes of the game.

In a statistically even game, Denver outgained San Diego by eight yards (335–327), but committed five turnovers to four for the Chargers. Joiner had 3 catches for 58 yards and the winning touchdown despite twice having to leave the field to receive treatment for various injuries.

== Standings ==
AFC West
	W	L	T	PCT	DIV	CONF	PF	PA	STK
^{(1)} San Diego Chargers	12	4	0	.750	6–2	9–3	411	246	W2
^{(5)} Denver Broncos	10	6	0	.625	4–4	7–5	289	262	L2
Seattle Seahawks	9	7	0	.563	3–5	6–6	378	372	W2
Oakland Raiders	9	7	0	.563	3–5	5–7	365	337	L1
Kansas City Chiefs	7	9	0	.438	4–4	7–7	238	262	L1

== Postseason ==
Round	Date	Opponent (seed)	Result	Record	Venue	Attendance	Recap
Divisional	December 29	Houston Oilers (4)	L 14–17	0–1	San Diego Stadium	51,192	Recap

=== Game summary ===
==== AFC Divisional Playoffs: Oilers at Chargers ====
AFC Divisional Playoffs: (#4) Houston Oilers at (#1) San Diego Chargers – Game summary

Quarter	1	2	3	4	Total
Oilers	0	10	0	7	17
Chargers	7	0	7	0	14

at San Diego Stadium, San Diego, California

- Date: December 29
- Game time: 1:00 p.m. PST
- Game weather: 60 °F (15.6 °C), relative humidity 37%, wind 8 miles per hour (13 km/h; 7.0 kn)
- Game attendance: 51,192
- Referee: Ben Dreith
- TV announcers (NBC): Dick Enberg (play-by-play) and Merlin Olsen (color commentator)
- Box score

Game information

First quarter

- SDG – Clarence Williams 1-yard run (Mike Wood kick), 4:49. Chargers 7–0. Drive: 11 plays, 81 yards, 4:08.

Second quarter

- HOU – Toni Fritsch 26-yard field goal, 4:02. Chargers 7–3. Drive: 6 plays, 20 yards, 2:08.
- HOU – Boobie Clark 1-yard run (Toni Fritsch kick), 0:19. Oilers 10–7. Drive: 8 plays, 38 yards, 2:40.

Third quarter

- SDG – Lydell Mitchell 8-yard pass run (Mike Wood kick), 13:08. Chargers 14–10. Drive: 8 plays, 65 yards, 1:52.

Fourth quarter

- HOU – Mike Renfro 47-yard pass from Gifford Nielsen (Toni Fritsch kick), 2:05. Oilers 17–14. Drive: 3 plays, 46 yards, 0:57.

Top passers

- HOU – Gifford Nielsen – 10/19, 111 yards, TD, INT
- SDG – Dan Fouts – 25/47, 333 yards, 5 INT

Top rushers

- HOU – Rob Carpenter – 18 rushes, 67 yards
- SDG – Lydell Mitchell – 8 rushes, 33 yards, TD

Top receivers

- HOU – Mike Renfro – 1 reception, 47 yards
- SDG – Charlie Joiner – 4 receptions, 81 yards

Houston were missing their starting quarterback and running back, making the Chargers strong favorites. The Oilers punted on the game's opening possession, and San Diego drove 81 yards for their first touchdown—Fouts kept the drive going with completions of 34 yards for Greg McCrary on 3rd and 1, and 17 yards to Jefferson on 3rd and 15. The Chargers had a 3rd and 3 at the Houston 48-yard line on their next drive, but Fouts was intercepted by Vernon Perry. Fouts began his next opportunity with three consecutive completions for 38 yards, and narrowly converted on 3rd and 11 with a pass to Floyd. The drive eventually stalled on the Oilers 8-yard line. Wood came on for a 26-yard field goal try, which was blocked by Perry and returned for 57 yards to the San Diego 28 before Fuller made the tackle. Houston turned that play into a field goal. Perry intercepted Fouts again three plays later, and the Oilers scored on 4th and goal from the 1 to take a 10–7 lead 19 seconds before halftime.

In the second half, San Diego again scored a touchdown on their first possession, with Joiner's 20-yard catch on 3rd and 10 the biggest play. After an exchange of punts, Houston drove to the San Diego 18, from where Mike Williams made an end zone interception. The Chargers advanced to a 3rd and 7 from their own 38-yard line. From there, Joiner's 8-yard catch was ruled out when Billy Shields was flagged for holding, then Fouts was intercepted. Houston's game-winning touchdown came three plays later. Before teams punted from near midfield on their next possessions, and San Diego took over at their own 10-yard line with 6:34 left to play. Fouts completed consecutive passes of 15 yards to Klein and 30 yards to Joiner. Fouts was then sacked for a loss of 8 yards, but threw a 17-yard completion to Floyd and Clarence Williams gained a yard to bring up 1st and 10 from the Houston 35. Perry intercepted Fouts on the next play. The Chargers had a final chance, starting from their own 5-yard line with 1:08 to play. They were able to reach their own 40 before Perry made a game-clinching interception with two seconds left.

Four of Fouts' five interceptions went to Perry; as of 2025, Perry has the playoff record for interceptions in a single game. San Diego had more total yards (380–259) and picked up 25 first downs to 15 for Houston.

A week after the game, Sports Illustrated published an article entitled "The Stolen Signals Caper." For the season, San Diego's standard game method was for offensive coordinator Joe Gibbs to stay upstairs in the booth and phone plays down to Head Coach Don Coryell and Jim Hanifan on the sidelines. The two of them would confer, and then Hanifan would signal in the plays using hand signals much like baseball teams use. Houston Defense Coordinator Eddie Biles broke the code and the Oilers did not overplay their hand. Biles merely signaled the play to Oiler middle linebacker Gregg Bingham who called the Houston defense on the field. Bingham stated, "My job was to put us into the right defense — I guess you'd say the perfect defense." One result is that Houston strong safety Vernon Perry intercepted four of Fouts' passes, three of them while playing double coverage. Oiler J.C. Wilson also had one interception. The article stated, "People who have been around the Chargers for years said they had never seen him [Fouts] throw into so much double coverage." Chargers lost and in 1980 finished 11-5 the same as the Raiders the two faced in the AFC Championship Game but lost 34-27.

== Awards ==
Seven Chargers were named to the 1980 Pro Bowl, and four were named first or second team Associated Press (AP) All-Pros. Fouts was runner-up to Earl Campbell in the voting for AP NFL Most Valuable Player (34 votes to 27) and for the AP NFL Offensive Player of the Year (39 votes to 34), and Coryell finished in third place for NFL Coach of the Year with 10 of the 80 votes available.

Player	Position	Pro Bowl starter	Pro Bowl reserve	Pro Bowl alternate	AP 1st team All-Pro	AP 2nd team All-Pro
Fred Dean	Defensive end	Yes				
Dan Fouts	Quarterback	Yes			Yes	
John Jefferson	Wide receiver	Yes			Yes	
Charlie Joiner	Wide receiver			Yes		
Gary Johnson	Defensive tackle		Yes			
Russ Washington	Tackle	Yes				Yes
Ed White	Guard		Yes			Yes
