= Frank Duncan (American football) =

American football player (born 1956)

No. 21, 42, 47
- Position: Safety

Personal information
- Born: November 16, 1956 (age 69); San Francisco, California, U.S.
- Listed height: 6 ft 1 in (1.85 m)
- Listed weight: 190 lb (86 kg)

Career information
- High school: Jefferson (Daly City, California)
- College: San Francisco State
- NFL draft: 1979: 12th round, 321st overall pick

Career history
- San Diego Chargers (1979–1981); Oakland Invaders (1983–1984); New Jersey Generals (1985)

Career NFL statistics
- Games played: 26
- Games started: 5
- Interceptions: 1
- Stats at Pro Football Reference

Frank Milton Duncan (born November 16, 1956) is an American former professional football player who was a safety for the San Diego Chargers of the National Football League (NFL). He played college football for the San Francisco State Gators, earning All-American honors in Division II in 1978. Duncan was selected by the Chargers in the 12th round of the 1979 NFL draft. After playing three seasons with San Diego, he played three more in the United States Football League (USFL) with the Oakland Invaders and New Jersey Generals.

== Early life ==
Born in San Francisco, Duncan attended Jefferson High School in Daly City, California. He played college ball as a strong safety at San Francisco State University. As a senior in 1978, Duncan was only a second-team all-conference selection in the Far West Conference, though he was named a Division II All-American. He played in the East–West Shrine Game, recording a game-high 11 tackles.

== Professional career ==
Duncan was selected by the San Diego Chargers in the 12th round of the 1979 NFL draft with the 321st overall pick. Their final pick of the draft, Duncan thought his chances were "slim" to make the team. After the Chargers told him that he had been waived on August 27, 1979, he went home and began packing. However, he was re-signed by San Diego the next day. Injured veterans Louie Kelcher and Doug Wilkerson, for whom the team had cleared room on their 45-man roster, were then placed on injured reserve, opening space. "Some day [Duncan] will be a starter, and not too long", predicted Chargers head coach Don Coryell.

In Duncan's first two seasons with the Chargers, he played 19 games without a start. He missed 12 games as a rookie in 1979 due to back and ankle injuries. Playing on special teams in 1980, his 74 combined blocks and tackles on special teams coverage were second on the team behind Hank Bauer. In 1981, new San Diego defensive coordinator Jack Pardee named four new starters on defense. Only the cornerbacks remained the same in the secondary, with Duncan and Bob Gregor replacing Pete Shaw and Mike Fuller as safeties. In week 2 against Detroit, Duncan stepped in front of the Lions' Freddie Scott and intercepted a pass from Gary Danielson at the Chargers' one-yard line with one second remaining in the game, preserving a 28–23 win for San Diego. In October, Duncan was placed on injured reserve after spraining his ankle against Baltimore. He was cut by the Chargers prior to the start of the 1982 season. He then played in the USFL for the Oakland Invaders and New Jersey Generals.

== Personal life ==
In 1995, Duncan was convicted of felony battery and a misdemeanor battery charge in an attack of his girlfriend during an argument in his parents' home in Daly City. He was sentenced to eight years in prison.
