= 1978 All-South Independent football team =

American college football season

1978 All-South Independent Football Team
- League: NCAA Division I-A
- Sport: College football
- Duration: 1978 season
- Teams: Multiple independent selections

The 1978 All-South Independent football team consists of American football players chosen by the Associated Press for their All-South independent teams for the 1978 NCAA Division I-A football season.

== Offense ==
Quarterback

- Rich Hontas, Tulane (AP-1)
- Jimmy Jordan, Florida State (AP-2)

Running backs

- Eddie Lee Ivery, Georgia Tech (AP-1)
- Ottis Anderson, Miami (AP-1)
- Nathan Poole, Louisville (AP-1)
- Eddie Hicks, East Carolina (AP-2)
- George Rogers, South Carolina (AP-2)
- Marvin Christian, Tulane (AP-2)

Wide receivers

- Drew Hill, Georgia Tech (AP-1)
- Jackie Flowers, Florida State (AP-1)
- Ernest Gray, Memphis (AP-1)
- John Floyd, Louisiana-Monroe (AP-2)
- John Smith, Tennessee State (AP-2)

Tackles

- Nate Henderson, Florida State (AP-1)
- Randy Butler, Southern Mississippi (AP-1)
- George Schechterly, South Carolina (AP-2)
- Gerry Sheridan, Tulane (AP-2)

Guards

- Jimmy Carter, Tennessee State (AP-1)
- Mike Good, Florida State (AP-1)
- Kent Hill, Georgia Tech (AP-2)
- Wayne Inman, East Carolina (AP-2)

Center

- Dee Methvin, Tulane (AP-1)
- Denny Clancy, South Carolina (AP-2)

== Defense ==
Defensive ends

- Zack Valentine, East Carolina (AP-1)
- Willie Jones, Florida State (AP-1)
- John Dantonio, South Carolina (AP-2)
- Melvin Martin, William & Mary (AP-2)

Defensive tackles

- Don Smith, Miami (AP-1)
- Stoney Parker, Southern Mississippi (AP-1)
- Maurice Fitzgerald, Tennessee State (AP-2)
- Doug McDougald, Virginia Tech (AP-2)
- Wilfred Simon, Tulane (AP-2)

Linebackers

- Ron Taylor, Southern Mississippi (AP-1)
- Otis Wilson, Louisville (AP-1)
- Mackel Harris, Georgia Tech (AP-1)
- Mike Brewington, East Carolina (AP-2)
- Harold Thompson, Louisiana-Monroe (AP-2)
- Aaron Joseph, Tennessee State (AP-2)

Defensive backs

- Jeff Nixon, Richmond (AP-1)
- Gerald Hall, East Carolina (AP-1)
- Roy Binion, Louisiana-Monroe (AP-1)
- Rick Sanford, South Carolina (AP-2)
- Gene Bunn, Virginia Tech (AP-2)
- Tony Graves, Memphis (AP-2)

== Special teams ==
Kicker

- Ed Murray, Tulane (AP-1)
- Dave Cappelen, Florida State (AP-2)

Punter

- Max Runager, South Carolina (AP-1)
- Mike Wright, Southern Mississippi (AP-2)
