= List of Los Angeles Chargers retired numbers =

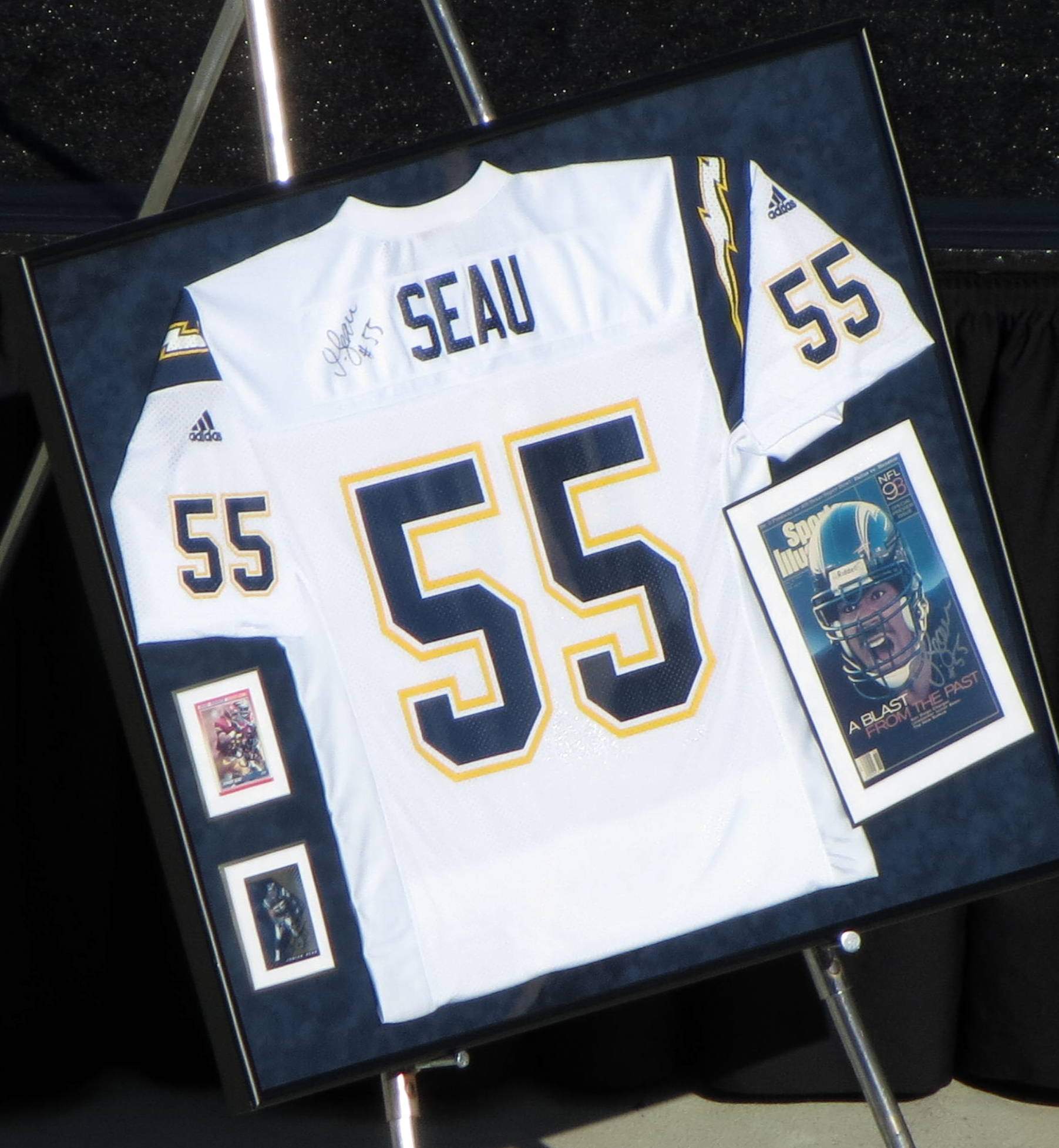
Junior Seau's No. 55 was retired posthumously by the then-San Diego Chargers in 2012.

The Los Angeles Chargers are a professional American football team in the National Football League (NFL) based in the Greater Los Angeles area. The club began play in 1960 as a charter member of the American Football League (AFL), and spent its first season in Los Angeles before moving to San Diego in 1961. They returned to the Greater Los Angeles area in 2017. NFL teams assign each of their players a jersey number ranging from 0 through 99. The Chargers no longer issue six retired numbers.

== Selection process ==
As of 2010, the team's policy was to have the Chargers Hall of Fame committee evaluate candidates for a player's number to retire after the player has retired from the league after five years. The committee consisted of Chargers Executive Vice President A. G. Spanos, Chargers public relations director Bill Johnston, San Diego Hall of Champions founder Bob Breitbard, and the presidents of the San Diego Sports Commission and the Chargers Backers Fan Club. There are few recognized guidelines in sports regarding retiring numbers, and the NFL has no specific league policy. "You have to have enough numbers for players to wear," said NFL spokesman Greg Aiello.

== History ==
The Chargers have rarely retired numbers. In 2006, The San Diego Union-Tribune wrote, "The [Chargers] tend to honor their heritage haphazardly." Pro Football Hall of Fame offensive tackle Ron Mix in 1969 was the first Charger to have his number retired after he announced he was quitting football. However, he came out of retirement in 1971 to play for the Oakland Raiders. Then-Chargers owner Gene Klein, who hated the Raiders, unretired the number.

Dan Fouts had his No. 14 retired in 1988, a year after his retirement. He was the first NFL quarterback to top the 4,000-yard passing mark in three consecutive seasons. He set a then-NFL single-season passing record in 1981, throwing for a career-high 4,802 yards. At the retirement of his number, Fouts asked for "more recognition of former players and a warmer relationship between Charger players and management. I'd like to see Lance Alworth's number retired, too. We've had some great players here."

Alworth's No. 19 was retired in 2005, 35 years after he last played for the Chargers and 27 years after he was inducted into the Pro Football Hall of Fame. He was still one of the most popular athletes in San Diego history. Nicknamed Bambi for his speed and graceful leaping skills, Alworth was a pioneer for the Chargers and the AFL in the 1960s. He was selected All-AFL seven times from 1963 to 1969 and averaged more than 50 catches and 1,000 yards a year with San Diego. He retired with the most career yards (9,584) in team history, a record that held for almost 45 years. (Note: Antonio Gates broke the yardage record in 2014.)

The Union-Tribune in 2003 wrote that the Chargers no longer retired numbers, but Chargers president Dean Spanos said Junior Seau might be an exception. "If there's going to be another number retired, that's the one that's going to be retired," Spanos said. Seau made 12 consecutive Pro Bowl appearances with San Diego. He initially retired from the NFL in a 2006 ceremony with the Chargers, and the team planned to retire his number—as early as 2011—after his anticipated induction into the Pro Football Hall of Fame. However, Seau signed with the New England Patriots four days later, and continued playing until 2009. Seau's No. 55 was retired in 2012 posthumously at his memorial. "His play on the field combined with his leadership and charisma became the face of this team for more than a decade. I can't think of anyone more deserving of this honor," said Spanos.

After LaDainian Tomlinson signed a one-day contract and retired as a Charger in 2012, Dean Spanos said his number would be retired in the future. On November 22, 2015, the Chargers retired Tomlinson's No. 21.

In 2020, Chargers equipment manager Bob Wick said that he tried to keep Charlie Joiner's No. 18 out of circulation, even though it had not been officially retired. The Chargers retired Joiner's No. 18 and Kellen Winslow's No. 80 in 2023.

== Retired numbers ==
Key
No.	Retired number
Player	Name of player honored
Position	Player position
Career	Years played with Chargers
Retired	Year number was retired
Honors	Accomplishments and awards
†	Posthumously retired

Los Angeles Chargers retired numbers
No.	Image	Player	Position	Career	Retired	Honors	Ref
14		Dan Fouts	QB	1973–1987	1988	Pro Football Hall of Fame; NFL 1980s All-Decade Team; Chargers Hall of Fame; Chargers 50th. anniv. team	
18		Charlie Joiner	WR	1976–1986	2023	Pro Football Hall of Fame; Chargers Hall of Fame	
19		Lance Alworth	WR	1962–1970	2005	Pro Football Hall of Fame; NFL 75th Anniversary All-Time Team; NFL 100th Anniversary All-Time Team; Chargers Hall of Fame; AFL All-Time Team; College Football Hall of Fame	
21		LaDainian Tomlinson	RB	2001–2009	2015	Pro Football Hall of Fame; Chargers Hall of Fame; College Football Hall of Fame	
55		Junior Seau†	LB	1990–2002	2012	Pro Football Hall of Fame; Chargers Hall of Fame; NFL 1990s All-Decade Team; NFL 100th Anniversary All-Time Team	
~~74~~		~~Ron Mix~~ (Note: Number was un-retired by the Chargers in 1971 due to then Chargers owner Gene Klein's dislike towards the Raiders (where Mix had been played for).)	OT	1960–1969	1969	Pro Football Hall of Fame; AFL All-Time Team; Chargers Hall of Fame	
80		Kellen Winslow	TE	1979–1987	2023	Pro Football Hall of Fame; NFL 1980s All-Decade Team; NFL 75th Anniversary All-Time Team; NFL 100th Anniversary All-Time Team; Chargers Hall of Fame	

== See also ==
- List of National Football League retired numbers
