= Clarence Williams (running back, born 1955) =

American football player (1955–1994)

No. 40
- Position: Running back

Personal information
- Born: January 25, 1955; Oakley, South Carolina, U.S.
- Died: September 18, 1994 (aged 39); Columbia, South Carolina, U.S.
- Listed height: 5 ft 9 in (1.75 m)
- Listed weight: 194 lb (88 kg)

Career information
- High school: Berkeley (Moncks Corner, South Carolina)
- College: South Carolina
- NFL draft: 1977: 5th round, 124th overall pick

Career history
- San Diego Chargers (1977–1981); Washington Redskins (1982)

Career NFL statistics
- Rushing attempts: 394
- Rushing yards: 1,327
- Rushing TDs: 17
- Stats at Pro Football Reference

Clarence Williams (January 25, 1955 – September 18, 1994) was an American professional football player who was a running back in the National Football League (NFL) for the San Diego Chargers and Washington Redskins. He played college football for the South Carolina Gamecocks and was selected in the fifth round of the 1977 NFL draft. On September 16, 1979, Williams rushed for four touchdowns for the San Diego Chargers in a win over the Buffalo Bills, a franchise record he shares with LaDainian Tomlinson.

== College career ==
While attending the University of South Carolina, Williams lettered in football in 1975-76 and rushed for 2,311 career yards, including eight 100-yard games. He was inducted into the University of South Carolina Athletic Hall of Fame in 2008.

== NFL career statistics ==
Legend
**Bold**	Career high

=== Regular season ===
Year	Team	Games		Rushing					Receiving				
Year	Team	GP	GS	Att	Yds	Avg	Lng	TD	Rec	Yds	Avg	Lng	TD
1977	SDG	14	0	50	215	**4.3**	46	2	3	20	6.7	9	0
1978	SDG	10	1	27	76	2.8	12	0	1	17	**17.0**	17	0
1979	SDG	**16**	**16**	**200**	**752**	3.8	**55**	**12**	**51**	**352**	6.9	14	0
1980	SDG	13	9	97	258	2.7	13	3	26	230	8.8	**26**	**1**
1981	SDG	14	1	20	26	1.3	6	0	12	108	9.0	15	**1**
		67	27	394	1,327	3.4	55	17	93	727	7.8	26	2

=== Playoffs ===
Year	Team	Games		Rushing					Receiving				
Year	Team	GP	GS	Att	Yds	Avg	Lng	TD	Rec	Yds	Avg	Lng	TD
1979	SDG	1	**1**	**11**	**30**	**2.7**	**8**	**1**	**4**	**30**	**7.5**	**12**	0
1980	SDG	1	0	0	0	0.0	0	0	0	0	0.0	0	0
1981	SDG	**2**	0	0	0	0.0	0	0	0	0	0.0	0	0
		4	1	11	30	2.7	8	1	4	30	7.5	12	0

== Death ==
On September 17, 1994, Williams was shot in his car while at an intersection. He died at Richland Memorial Hospital in Columbia, South Carolina, the following day.
