= John Floyd (American football) =

American football player (born 1956)

No. 86
- Position: Wide receiver

Personal information
- Born: September 10, 1956 (age 70); Big Sandy, Texas, U.S.
- Listed height: 6 ft 1 in (1.85 m)
- Listed weight: 195 lb (88 kg)

Career information
- High school: Gladewater (Gladewater, Texas)
- College: Louisiana–Monroe
- NFL draft: 1979: 4th round, 104th overall pick

Career history
- San Diego Chargers (1979–1980); St. Louis Cardinals (1981)

Career NFL statistics
- Receptions: 14
- Receiving yards: 215
- Receiving touchdowns: 2
- Stats at Pro Football Reference

John Manuel Floyd (born September 10, 1956) is an American former professional football player who was a wide receiver in the National Football League (NFL) for the San Diego Chargers and the St. Louis Cardinals. He played college football for the Louisiana–Monroe Warhawks. As an NFL rookie with San Diego in 1979, Floyd was the Chargers' third receiver, backing up starters John Jefferson and Charlie Joiner.
