= John Jefferson (American football) =

American football player (born 1956)

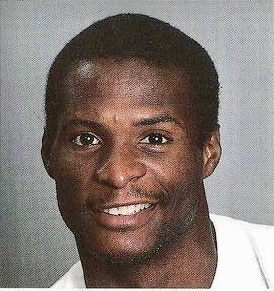
- Jefferson in 1985

No. 83, 85, 89
- Position: Wide receiver

Personal information
- Born: February 3, 1956 (age 70); Dallas, Texas, U.S.
- Listed height: 6 ft 1 in (1.85 m)
- Listed weight: 198 lb (90 kg)

Career information
- High school: Franklin D. Roosevelt (Dallas, Texas)
- College: Arizona State (1974–1977)
- NFL draft: 1978: 1st round, 14th overall pick

Career history
- San Diego Chargers (1978–1980); Green Bay Packers (1981–1984); Cleveland Browns (1985); Houston Oilers (1986)*
- * Offseason or practice squad member only

Awards and highlights
- 2× First-team All-Pro (1979, 1980); Second-team All-Pro (1978); 4× Pro Bowl (1978–1980, 1982); NFL receiving yards leader (1980); 2× NFL receiving touchdowns leader (1978, 1980); PFWA All-Rookie Team (1978); San Diego Chargers 50th Anniversary Team; Consensus All-American (1977)

Career NFL statistics
- Receptions: 351
- Receiving yards: 5,714
- Receiving touchdowns: 47
- Stats at Pro Football Reference
- College Football Hall of Fame

John Larry Jefferson (né Washington; born February 3, 1956) is an American former professional football player who was a wide receiver in the National Football League (NFL). After playing college football with the Arizona State Sun Devils, he was selected in the first round of the 1978 NFL draft by the San Diego Chargers. He played three seasons in San Diego, where he became the first NFL player to gain 1,000 receiving yards in each of his first three seasons. He was traded to the Green Bay Packers after a contract dispute with the Chargers, and later finished his playing career with the Cleveland Browns.

== College career ==
After graduating from Franklin D. Roosevelt High School in the Oak Cliff neighborhood of Dallas, Jefferson received a scholarship to attend Arizona State University. He played for the Sun Devils from 1974 to 1977. Jefferson's breakout year occurred in his sophomore season (1975) when he led the team with 52 receptions and 921 yards receiving on the way to a perfect 12–0 season and an appearance in the Fiesta Bowl, where he was also named Most Valuable Player. ASU finished second in the national polls, its highest ranking in history.

A consensus All-American selection in 1977 and two-time All-Western Athletic Conference pick, Jefferson concluded his career with an NCAA record 42 consecutive games with a reception. He remains the ASU leader in career receptions with 188 and career receiving yardage with 2,993. Recognized as Arizona Amateur Athlete of the Year in 1977, he was twice selected as the Sun Devils Most Valuable Player and led the team in receiving all four years.

== Professional career ==
=== San Diego Chargers ===
After his senior year at Arizona State, Jefferson was drafted in the first round with the 14th overall pick in the 1978 NFL draft by the San Diego Chargers. Jefferson would appear in four Pro Bowls during his career. He, along with Charlie Joiner, Kellen Winslow and Wes Chandler (who replaced him on the Chargers) represented one of the most potent receiving corps of the early 1980s, known as Air Coryell. Jefferson was known for making spectacular catches with his body control and great hands.

On October 15, 1978, against the Miami Dolphins, he was blinded after being poked in the eye while going up for a wobbly pass from quarterback Dan Fouts. He missed the next two games before returning, wearing prescription goggles for protection. On November 12 against the Kansas City Chiefs, Jefferson caught a 14-yard touchdown pass with no time remaining while slipping in a wet end zone for a 29–23 overtime victory. On December 4, he caught 7 passes for 155 yards and 1 touchdown against the Chicago Bears. He had eight touchdowns in the final six games of the year. Jefferson finished his rookie season with 56 receptions for 1,001 yards and a league-leading 13 receiving touchdowns, which was tied for the NFL record for most receiving touchdowns by a rookie with Billy Howton from 1952, until broken by Randy Moss in 1998. Jefferson was one of four NFL receivers to finish the season with 1,000 yards, and he set the Chargers' single-season, rookie record for yards receiving, which stood until Keenan Allen's 1,046 in 2013. Jefferson earned second-team All-Pro honors and was named to the Pro Bowl. He appeared on the cover of the August 20, 1979 issue of Sports Illustrated with the headline "The Touchdown Man."

Jefferson was a first-team All-Pro in each of the next two seasons and led the NFL in receiving yards (1,340) and receiving touchdowns (13) in 1980. He became the first NFL player with at least 1,000 yards receiving in each of his first three seasons. In a September 14, 1980, overtime game against the Oakland Raiders, played in San Diego, Jefferson out-leaped Lester Hayes for a throw from Dan Fouts. Jefferson landed at about the Oakland 3-yard line. Hayes stood over Jefferson, stunned that Jefferson had taken the ball away while Jefferson rolled untouched into the end zone, sealing a 30-24 San Diego Chargers' overtime victory. While in San Diego, Jefferson also became known as the "Space-Age Receiver" due to the futuristic-looking goggles he wore. With his acrobatic catches and fiery enthusiasm before games, he became a fan favorite in San Diego. Jefferson caught at least one pass in all but one of his 45 regular season starts with San Diego, the lone exception being a September 16, 1979 game against the Buffalo Bills, who double-teamed him. The Chargers did not target him on any pass plays, but the attention he drew from the Bills defense helped the team rush for 245 yards.

Jefferson did not report to the Chargers in 1981 and asked San Diego to renegotiate his contract as at least three other wide receivers in the league were paid more than him. On September 17, 1981, one day after he stated that he could not play for San Diego, he was traded to the Green Bay Packers for wide receiver Aundra Thompson, a 1983 1st round draft pick, a 1982 2nd round draft pick and a 1984 2nd round draft pick. The two teams also agreed to exchange 1st round draft picks in 1982 should the Packers' draft position be higher than that of the Chargers.

Concurrently with the trade, he agreed to contract terms that would pay him between $275,000 and $300,000 per year over four seasons, a substantial increase over the $75,000 he would have made with San Diego in 1981.

=== Green Bay Packers ===
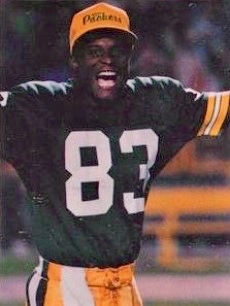
Jefferson with the Green Bay Packers c. 1984

With the Packers, Jefferson starred with future Hall of Fame wideout James Lofton. Jefferson, Lofton, tight end Paul Coffman and quarterback Lynn Dickey gave the Packers one of the most explosive passing attacks in the NFL, but a defense which hovered near the bottom of the league relegated Green Bay to three consecutive 8-8 finishes and a second-round playoff appearance during the strike-shortened 1982 season.

In 1983, Green Bay's offense ranked fifth best in the NFL and Lynn Dickey led the league in passing. Jefferson had his best season in Green Bay that year with 57 catches for 830 yards with a 14.6 yard average. His reduced production in Green Bay was attributed to a number of causes: leaving San Diego's unique passing attack, playing as the secondary receiver to Lofton, a resulting loss in enthusiasm, friction with his position coach, Lew Carpenter, and a loss in speed and subpar conditioning. However, former coach Don Coryell said he had seen Jefferson practice and saw no drop off in speed or skill.

=== Cleveland Browns ===
After a long hold out in 1985, Green Bay traded Jefferson to the Cleveland Browns, where he played his final season. In seven games, he had three receptions for 30 yards.

=== Houston Oilers ===
Jefferson signed with the Houston Oilers in 1986, but was waived before the start of the regular season. He subsequently retired.

== Career statistics ==
=== NFL ===
Legend
	Led the league
**Bold**	Career high

==== Regular season ====
Year	Team	Games		Receiving				
Year	Team	GP	GS	Rec	Yds	Avg	Lng	TD
1978	SDG	14	14	56	1,001	**17.9**	46	**13**
1979	SDG	15	15	61	1,090	**17.9**	**65**	10
1980	SDG	**16**	**16**	**82**	**1,340**	16.3	58	**13**
1981	GNB	13	13	39	632	16.2	41	4
1982	GNB	8	8	27	452	16.7	50	0
1983	GNB	**16**	**16**	57	830	14.6	36	7
1984	GNB	13	12	26	339	13.0	33	0
1985	CLE	7	2	3	30	10.0	17	0
		102	96	351	5,714	16.3	65	47

==== Playoffs ====
Year	Team	Games		Receiving				
Year	Team	GP	GS	Rec	Yds	Avg	Lng	TD
1979	SDG	1	1	4	70	17.5	21	0
1980	SDG	**2**	**2**	**11**	173	15.7	28	0
1982	GNB	**2**	**2**	8	**188**	**23.5**	**60**	**2**
		5	5	23	431	18.7	60	2

=== College ===
Career Arizona State Statistics

- 1974: 30 receptions, 423 yards, 1 TD.
- 1975: 52 receptions, 921 yards, 6 TDs
- 1976: 48 receptions, 681 yards, 5 TDs
- 1977: 58 receptions, 968 yards, 8 TDs
- **Totals: 188 receptions, 2,993 yards, 20 TDs**

== Later life ==
After his retirement, Jefferson graduated from Arizona State in 1989 with a B.A. in History. He was inducted into the Arizona State Hall of Fame in 1979 and the College Football Hall of Fame in 2002.

He has remained active in the football community. At the urging of former head coach Forrest Gregg, Jefferson left commercial real estate to coach at SMU. Jefferson became an assistant coach at the University of Kansas and was the director of player development for the Washington Redskins until the end of the 2008–2009 season.
