= Greg McCrary =

American football player (1952–2013)

No. 88, 85, 84
- Position: Tight end

Personal information
- Born: March 24, 1952; Griffin, Georgia, U.S.
- Died: April 9, 2013 (aged 61); Atlanta, Georgia, U.S.
- Listed height: 6 ft 1 in (1.85 m)
- Listed weight: 233 lb (106 kg)

Career information
- High school: Griffin
- College: Clark (GA)
- NFL draft: 1975: 5th round, 123rd overall pick

Career history
- Atlanta Falcons (1975–1977); Washington Redskins (1978); San Diego Chargers (1978-1980); Washington Redskins (1981)

Career NFL statistics
- Receptions: 22
- Receiving yards: 228
- Receiving TDs: 4
- Stats at Pro Football Reference

Gregory Alonza McCrary (March 24, 1952 – April 9, 2013) was an American professional football player who was a tight end in the National Football League (NFL) for the Atlanta Falcons, Washington Redskins, and the San Diego Chargers. He played college football for the Clark Atlanta Panthers and was selected in the fifth round of the 1975 NFL draft.

McCrary suffered a cardiac arrest on April 6, 2013, and died on April 9, 2013.
