= Hank Bauer (American football) =

American football player and sportscaster (born 1954)

No. 37
- Position: Running back

Personal information
- Born: July 15, 1954 (age 72); Scottsbluff, Nebraska, U.S.
- Listed height: 5 ft 10 in (1.78 m)
- Listed weight: 200 lb (91 kg)

Career information
- High school: Magnolia (Anaheim, California)
- College: Cal Lutheran
- NFL draft: 1976: undrafted

Career history

Playing
- Dallas Cowboys (1976)*; San Diego Chargers (1977–1982)
- * Offseason or practice squad member only

Coaching
- San Diego Chargers (1983–1986) (special teams coach)

Awards and highlights
- Awards: Chargers Most Inspirational Player 1978; Chargers Special Teams MVP 1980–1981; NFL Alumni Special Teams Player of the Year; TBS NFL Special Teams Player of the Year; Pro Football Journal All NFL Decade Team '75–'85, Special Teamer; Honors: Charger team captain; San Diego Chargers 50th Anniversary Team; San Diego Chargers 40th Anniversary Team; Cal Lutheran Hall Of Fame; NFL records: NFL Record 52 special teams tackles in 1981; Scored 3 TDs on 4 carries, but gained just 1 net yard vs New Orleans (9 December 1979)

Career NFL statistics
- Games played – started: 86 – 4
- Touchdowns: 21
- Stats at Pro Football Reference

Henry John Bauer (born July 15, 1954) is an American sports broadcaster and former professional football player. He was a running back for the San Diego Chargers of the National Football League (NFL). He was named NFL Special Teams Player of the Year three times. After his playing career, he became a television and radio broadcaster.

== College ==
Bauer helped the Cal Lutheran Kingsmen reach the NAIA Championship of 1975 in his final year. He held CLU records for career carries (502), touchdowns in a game (4), a season (17) and a career (38), as well as yards in a season (1,024) and a career (2,700). He played for the Kingsmen team from 1972 to 1975 and holds the third-highest career rushing total (2,659) and all-purpose yards (2,998) in the university's history. He remains the only Cal Lutheran running back to rush for four touchdowns twice in a game.

== Professional career ==
=== Dallas Cowboys ===
After graduating California Lutheran University, Bauer signed as a free agent in 1976 with the Dallas Cowboys only to be cut three weeks into training camp.

=== San Diego Chargers ===
Bauer was picked up in 1977 by the San Diego Chargers and went on to a distinguished playing and broadcasting career, entirely in San Diego. Bauer was honored in November 2009 as one of the 50 Greatest Chargers in team history as part of the Chargers' 50th Anniversary season celebration held at a large outdoor ceremony in downtown San Diego. Bauer also developed as a noted media spokesman during his career and went on to TV sportscasting as well as radio.

Bauer holds the NFL single-season record for most special-teams tackles with 52. As a short-yardage specialist and often referred to "Hank the Howitzer" for his explosive running style, Bauer finished one season with 18 carries for a total of 28 yards, scoring eight touchdowns and achieving nine first downs. Bauer was forced to retire in 1983, after playing six games with a broken neck.

== Personal life ==
After retiring from professional football, Bauer coached running backs and special teams for four years with the Chargers, then became a sports anchor for KFMB from 1987 to 2002. He worked from 1998 to 2014 as the color commentator for the Chargers radio broadcasts on FM105.3 and AM1360 in San Diego. The Chargers suspended Bauer for one game in 2014 after he made an antisemitic joke during a game. Bauer apologized a day after the remark was publicized by Deadspin, although the Anti-Defamation League called the apology "inadequate." After the season, the Chargers let Bauer go. Bauer was the sports anchor at KFMB-TV8 in San Diego from 1987 through 2003.
