= 1983 Los Angeles Raiders season =

NFL team season (won Super Bowl)

- Owner: Al Davis
- General manager: Al Davis
- Head coach: Tom Flores
- Defensive coordinator: Charlie Sumner
- Home stadium: Los Angeles Memorial Coliseum

Results
- Record: 12–4
- Division place: 1st AFC West
- Playoffs: Won Divisional Playoffs (vs. Steelers) 38–10; Won AFC Championship (vs. Seahawks) 30–14; Won Super Bowl XVIII (vs. Redskins) 38–9
- All-Pros: 5: TE Todd Christensen; CB Lester Hayes; DE Howie Long; OLB Rod Martin; S Vann McElroy
- Pro Bowlers: 8: TE Todd Christensen; CB Lester Hayes; OLB Ted Hendricks; OT Henry Lawrence; DE Howie Long; OLB Rod Martin; FS Vann McElroy; RS Greg Pruitt

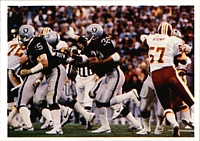
Allen (center) led the Raiders to a championship in Super Bowl XVIII and earned MVP honors as he rushed for a record of 191 yards, including a memorable 74-yard touchdown run.

The 1983 season was the Los Angeles Raiders' 14th season in the National Football League (NFL), their 24th season overall, and their second season in Los Angeles. The team began by attempting to improve on their 8–1 record from 1982 and went on to win the Super Bowl for the third time in franchise history. Prior to the Los Angeles Rams victory in Super Bowl LVI, the 1983 Raiders were the only NFL team to win the Super Bowl while based in Los Angeles. They became the 2nd team in NFL history to win 3 Super Bowls, the first being the Steelers. As of 2025, this is the Raiders' most recent championship; they also would not make another appearance in the Super Bowl until the 2002 season, by then back in Oakland.

NFL Films produced a documentary about the team's season entitled Just Win, Baby!; it was narrated by John Facenda, the 16th and final Raiders highlight film narrated by Facenda, who died on September 26, 1984. On November 24, 2006, NFL Network aired America's Game: The Super Bowl Champions, in which they ranked the 1983 Raiders at #20; the film was narrated by Alec Baldwin and featured commentary from players Marcus Allen, Todd Christensen and Howie Long.

== Offseason ==
=== NFL draft ===
During the draft the Raiders had attempted to execute a 3-team trade that would have brought future Hall of Fame quarterback John Elway to Los Angeles, but this trade was blocked, and Elway was instead drafted by the Colts, for whom he refused to play, then traded to the Broncos.

1983 Los Angeles Raiders Draft
| Round | Selection | Player | Position | College | Notes |
|---|---|---|---|---|---|
| 1 | 26 | Don Mosebar | C | USC | |
| 2 | 54 | Bill Pickel | NT | Rutgers | |
| 3 | 82 | Tony Caldwell | LB | Washington | |
| 4 | 110 | Greg Townsend | DE | TCU | |
| 5 | 138 | Dokie Williams | WR | UCLA | |
| 6 | 166 | Traded to the Washington Redskins | | | |
| 7 | 194 | Jeff McCall | RB | Clemson | |
| 8 | 222 | Mike Dotterer | RB | Stanford | |
| 9 | 249 | Kent Jordan | TE | St. Mary's | |
| 10 | 277 | Mervyn Fernandez | WR | San Jose State | |
| 11 | 305 | Traded to the Cleveland Browns | | | |
| 12 | 333 | Scott Lindquist | QB | Northern Arizona | |

== Personnel ==
=== Staff / Coaches ===
1983 Los Angeles Raiders staff
| Front office: Principal Owner / Managing General Partner – Al Davis; Minority Co-Owner - Eddie McGah; President of the General Partner / General manager – Al Davis; Director of Football Operations - Steve Ortmayer; Executive Assistant / Scout - Al LoCasale; Head coaches: Head coach – Tom Flores; Offensive coaches: Quality Control / Quarterbacks – Larry Kennan; Running backs – Ray Willsey; Assistant running backs – Terry Robiskie; Wide receivers / Quarterbacks – Tom Walsh; Tight ends – Bob Mischak; Offensive line – Sam Boghosian; Assistant offensive line – Art Shell | Defensive coaches: Defensive line – Earl Leggett; Linebackers – Charlie Sumner; Defensive backs – Willie Brown; Defensive backs – Chet Franklin; Special teams coaches: Special teams coordinator – Steve Ortmayer; Strength and conditioning: Head strength and conditioning – Bob Mischak |

=== Roster ===
1983 Los Angeles Raiders roster
| Quarterbacks (QB): 11 David Humm; 16 Jim Plunkett; Running backs (RB): 32 Marcus Allen; 40 Rick Berns; 27 Frank Hawkins; 31 Derrick Jensen; 33 Kenny King; 28 Cleo Montgomery; 34 Greg Pruitt; Wide receivers (WR): 80 Malcolm Barnwell; 21 Cliff Branch; 82 Calvin Muhammad; 85 Dokie Williams; Tight ends (TE): 46 Todd Christensen; 87 Don Hasselbeck | Offensive linemen (OL): 50 Dave Dalby C; 79 Bruce Davis T; 73 Charley Hannah G; 64 Shelby Jordan T; 70 Henry Lawrence T; 65 Mickey Marvin G; 72 Don Mosebar G; 76 Ed Muransky T; 66 Steve Sylvester G/C; Defensive linemen (DL): 77 Lyle Alzado DE; 62 Reggie Kinlaw NT; 75 Howie Long DE; 71 Bill Pickel DE; 68 Johnny Robinson NT; 61 Dave Stalls DE; 93 Greg Townsend DE | Linebackers (LB): 56 Jeff Barnes OLB; 54 Darryl Byrd ILB; 57 Tony Caldwell OLB; 83 Ted Hendricks OLB; 53 Rod Martin OLB; 55 Matt Millen ILB; 51 Bob Nelson ILB; 58 Jack Squirek ILB; Defensive backs (DB): 45 James Davis CB; 36 Mike Davis SS; 37 Lester Hayes CB; 22 Mike Haynes CB; 48 Kenny Hill SS; 26 Vann McElroy FS; 23 Odis McKinney FS; 20 Ted Watts CB; Special teams (ST): 10 Chris Bahr K; 8 Ray Guy P | Reserve: 59 Stan Adams LB (IR); -- Mike Dotterer RB (IR); -- Kent Jordan TE (NF-Inj.); 60 Curt Marsh G (IR); -- Jeff McCall RB (IR); 25 Irvin Phillips CB (IR); 74 Archie Reese DE (NF-Ill.); 52 Jim Romano C (IR); -- Vic Simmons WR (IR); 38 Chester Willis RB (IR); 6 Marc Wilson QB (IR); Rookies in italics |

== Training Camp ==
The 1983 Los Angeles Raiders training camp facility was the El Rancho Tropicana in Santa Rosa, California.

== Preseason ==
=== Schedule ===
| Week | Date | Opponent | Result | Record | Venue | Attendance | NFL.com recap |
|---|---|---|---|---|---|---|---|
| 1 | August 6 | San Francisco 49ers | W 26–23 (OT) | 1–0 | Los Angeles Memorial Coliseum | 41,337 | Recap |
| 2 | August 13 | at New York Jets | L 17–20 | 1–1 | Giants Stadium | 43,392 | Recap |
| 3 | August 20 | Chicago Bears | L 21–27 | 1–2 | Los Angeles Memorial Coliseum | 30,187 | Recap |
| 4 | August 26 | at Cleveland Browns | L 17–20 | 1–3 | Cleveland Stadium | 61,844 | Recap |

=== Game summaries ===
==== Week P1 (Saturday, August 6, 1983): vs. San Francisco 49ers ====
Preseason Week 1: San Francisco 49ers at Los Angeles Raiders

| Quarter | 1 | 2 | 3 | 4 | OT | Total |
|---|---|---|---|---|---|---|
| 49ers (0–1) | 7 | 9 | 7 | 0 | 0 | 23 |
| Raiders (1–0) | 0 | 0 | 3 | 20 | 3 | 26 |

at Los Angeles Memorial Coliseum • Los Angeles, California

- Date: August 6, 1983
- Game time: 6:00 p.m. PDT
- Game attendance: 41,337
- TV: KNBC

| Team | Category | Player | Statistics |
|---|---|---|---|
| SF | Passing | | |
| SF | Rushing | | |
| SF | Receiving | | |
| RAI | Passing | | |
| RAI | Rushing | | |
| RAI | Receiving | | |

Scoring summary

| Quarter | Time | Drive | | | Team | Scoring information | Score | |
| Quarter | Time | Plays | Yards | TOP | Team | Scoring information | SF | RAI |
|---|---|---|---|---|---|---|---|---|
| "TOP" = time of possession. For other American football terms, see Glossary of American football. | | | | | | | 23 | 26 |

- Point spread:
- Over/under:
- Time of game:

| 49ers | Game statistics | Raiders |
|---|---|---|
| | First downs | |
| | Rushes–yards | |
| | Passing yards | |
| | Passes | |
| | Sacked–yards | |
| | Net passing yards | |
| | Total yards | |
| | Return yards | |
| | Punts | |
| | Fumbles–lost | |
| | Penalties–yards | |
| | Time of possession | |

==== Week P2 (Saturday, August 13, 1983): at New York Jets ====
Preseason Week 2: Los Angeles Raiders at New York Jets

| Quarter | 1 | 2 | 3 | 4 | Total |
|---|---|---|---|---|---|
| Raiders (1–1) | 3 | 0 | 0 | 14 | 17 |
| Jets (1–1) | 14 | 3 | 3 | 0 | 20 |

at Giants Stadium • East Rutherford, New Jersey

- Date: August 13, 1983
- Game time: 5:00 p.m. PDT
- Game attendance: 43,392
- Referee: Tom Dooley
- TV: KNBC

| Team | Category | Player | Statistics |
|---|---|---|---|
| RAI | Passing | | |
| RAI | Rushing | | |
| RAI | Receiving | | |
| NYJ | Passing | | |
| NYJ | Rushing | | |
| NYJ | Receiving | | |

Scoring summary

| Quarter | Time | Drive | | | Team | Scoring information | Score | |
| Quarter | Time | Plays | Yards | TOP | Team | Scoring information | RAI | NYJ |
|---|---|---|---|---|---|---|---|---|
| "TOP" = time of possession. For other American football terms, see Glossary of American football. | | | | | | | 17 | 20 |

- Point spread:
- Over/under:
- Time of game:

| Raiders | Game statistics | Jets |
|---|---|---|
| | First downs | |
| | Rushes–yards | |
| | Passing yards | |
| | Passes | |
| | Sacked–yards | |
| | Net passing yards | |
| | Total yards | |
| | Return yards | |
| | Punts | |
| | Fumbles–lost | |
| | Penalties–yards | |
| | Time of possession | |

==== Week P3 (Saturday, August 20, 1983): vs. Chicago Bears ====
Preseason Week 3: Chicago Bears at Los Angeles Raiders

| Quarter | 1 | 2 | 3 | 4 | Total |
|---|---|---|---|---|---|
| Bears (2–1) | 0 | 14 | 3 | 10 | 27 |
| Raiders (1–2) | 14 | 0 | 0 | 7 | 21 |

at Los Angeles Memorial Coliseum • Los Angeles, California

- Date: August 20, 1983
- Game time: 6:00 p.m. PDT
- Game attendance: 30,187
- TV: KNBC

| Team | Category | Player | Statistics |
|---|---|---|---|
| CHI | Passing | | |
| CHI | Rushing | | |
| CHI | Receiving | | |
| RAI | Passing | | |
| RAI | Rushing | | |
| RAI | Receiving | | |

Scoring summary

| Quarter | Time | Drive | | | Team | Scoring information | Score | |
| Quarter | Time | Plays | Yards | TOP | Team | Scoring information | CHI | RAI |
|---|---|---|---|---|---|---|---|---|
| "TOP" = time of possession. For other American football terms, see Glossary of American football. | | | | | | | 27 | 21 |

- Point spread:
- Over/under:
- Time of game:

| Bears | Game statistics | Raiders |
|---|---|---|
| | First downs | |
| | Rushes–yards | |
| | Passing yards | |
| | Passes | |
| | Sacked–yards | |
| | Net passing yards | |
| | Total yards | |
| | Return yards | |
| | Punts | |
| | Fumbles–lost | |
| | Penalties–yards | |
| | Time of possession | |

==== Week P4 (Friday, August 26, 1983): at Cleveland Browns ====
Preseason Week 4: Los Angeles Raiders at Cleveland Browns

| Quarter | 1 | 2 | 3 | 4 | Total |
|---|---|---|---|---|---|
| Raiders (1–3) | 0 | 3 | 7 | 7 | 17 |
| Browns (3–1) | 13 | 7 | 0 | 0 | 20 |

at Cleveland Stadium • Cleveland, Ohio

- Date: August 26, 1983
- Game time: 5:00 p.m. PDT
- Game attendance: 61,844
- TV: NBC

| Team | Category | Player | Statistics |
|---|---|---|---|
| RAI | Passing | | |
| RAI | Rushing | | |
| RAI | Receiving | | |
| CLE | Passing | | |
| CLE | Rushing | | |
| CLE | Receiving | | |

Scoring summary

| Quarter | Time | Drive | | | Team | Scoring information | Score | |
| Quarter | Time | Plays | Yards | TOP | Team | Scoring information | RAI | CLE |
|---|---|---|---|---|---|---|---|---|
| "TOP" = time of possession. For other American football terms, see Glossary of American football. | | | | | | | 17 | 20 |

- Point spread:
- Over/under:
- Time of game:

| Raiders | Game statistics | Browns |
|---|---|---|
| | First downs | |
| | Rushes–yards | |
| | Passing yards | |
| | Passes | |
| | Sacked–yards | |
| | Net passing yards | |
| | Total yards | |
| | Return yards | |
| | Punts | |
| | Fumbles–lost | |
| | Penalties–yards | |
| | Time of possession | |

== Regular season ==
=== Schedule ===
| Week | Date | Opponent | Result | Record | Venue | Attendance | Recap |
|---|---|---|---|---|---|---|---|
| 1 | September 4 | at Cincinnati Bengals | **W** 20–10 | 1–0 | Riverfront Stadium | 50,956 | Recap |
| 2 | September 11 | Houston Oilers | **W** 20–6 | 2–0 | Los Angeles Memorial Coliseum | 37,526 | Recap |
| 3 | September 19 | Miami Dolphins | **W** 27–14 | 3–0 | Los Angeles Memorial Coliseum | 57,796 | Recap |
| 4 | September 25 | at **Denver Broncos** | **W** 22–7 | 4–0 | Mile High Stadium | 74,289 | Recap |
| 5 | October 2 | at Washington Redskins | **L** 35–37 | 4–1 | RFK Stadium | 54,106 | Recap |
| 6 | October 9 | **Kansas City Chiefs** | **W** 21–20 | 5–1 | Los Angeles Memorial Coliseum | 40,492 | Recap |
| 7 | October 16 | at **Seattle Seahawks** | **L** 36–38 | 5–2 | The Kingdome | 60,967 | Recap |
| 8 | October 23 | at Dallas Cowboys | **W** 40–38 | 6–2 | Texas Stadium | 64,991 | Recap |
| 9 | October 30 | **Seattle Seahawks** | **L** 21–34 | 6–3 | Los Angeles Memorial Coliseum | 49,708 | Recap |
| 10 | November 6 | at **Kansas City Chiefs** | **W** 28–20 | 7–3 | Arrowhead Stadium | 75,497 | Recap |
| 11 | November 13 | **Denver Broncos** | **W** 22–20 | 8–3 | Los Angeles Memorial Coliseum | 57,562 | Recap |
| 12 | November 20 | at Buffalo Bills | **W** 27–24 | 9–3 | Rich Stadium | 72,393 | Recap |
| 13 | November 27 | New York Giants | **W** 27–12 | 10–3 | Los Angeles Memorial Coliseum | 41,473 | Recap |
| 14 | December 1 | at **San Diego Chargers** | **W** 42–10 | 11–3 | Jack Murphy Stadium | 47,760 | Recap |
| 15 | December 11 | St. Louis Cardinals | **L** 24–34 | 11–4 | Los Angeles Memorial Coliseum | 32,111 | Recap |
| 16 | December 18 | **San Diego Chargers** | **W** 30–14 | 12–4 | Los Angeles Memorial Coliseum | 57,325 | Recap |
Note: Intra-division opponents are in **bold** text.

=== Game summaries ===
==== Week 1 (Sunday, September 4, 1983): at Cincinnati Bengals ====
Week 1: Los Angeles Raiders at Cincinnati Bengals – Game summary

| Quarter | 1 | 2 | 3 | 4 | Total |
|---|---|---|---|---|---|
| Raiders (1–0) | 7 | 10 | 0 | 3 | **20** |
| Bengals (0–1) | 0 | 0 | 3 | 7 | **10** |

at Riverfront Stadium • Cincinnati, Ohio

- Date: September 4, 1983
- Game time: 10:00 a.m. PDT
- Game weather: 75 °F (24 °C); relative humidity 67%; wind 9 mph (14 km/h)
- Game attendance: 50,956
- Referee: Ben Dreith
- TV announcers (NBC): Marv Albert (play-by-play) and John Brodie (color commentator)

| Team | Category | Player | Statistics |
|---|---|---|---|
| RAI | Passing | Jim Plunkett | 14/29, 158 YDS, 1 INT |
| RAI | Rushing | Marcus Allen | 17 CAR, 47 YDS, 2 TDs |
| RAI | Receiving | Malcolm Barnwell | 5 REC, 66 YDS |
| CIN | Passing | Ken Anderson | 26/35, 226 YDS, 1 TD, 1 INT |
| CIN | Rushing | Stanley Wilson | 4 CAR, 20 YDS |
| CIN | Receiving | Dan Ross | 5 REC, 60 YDS |

Scoring summary

| Quarter | Time | Drive | | | Team | Scoring information | Score | |
| Quarter | Time | Plays | Yards | TOP | Team | Scoring information | RAI | CIN |
|---|---|---|---|---|---|---|---|---|
| 1 | 7:32 | 15 | 84 | | Raiders | Allen 1-yard touchdown run, Bahr kick good | 7 | 0 |
| 2 | 9:05 | 14 | 77 | | Raiders | Allen 1-yard touchdown run, Bahr kick good | 14 | 0 |
| 2 | 4:59 | 5 | 26 | | Raiders | 38-yard field goal by Bahr | 17 | 0 |
| 3 | 9:23 | 4 | 17 | | Bengals | 36-yard field goal by Breech | 17 | 3 |
| 4 | 12:25 | 10 | 46 | | Raiders | 39-yard field goal by Bahr | 20 | 3 |
| 4 | 1:00 | 5 | 40 | | Bengals | Harris 9-yard touchdown reception from Anderson, Breech kick good | 20 | 10 |
| "TOP" = time of possession. For other American football terms, see Glossary of American football. | | | | | | | 20 | 10 |

- Point spread: Raiders +2
- Over/under: 42.0 **(under)**
- Time of game:

| Raiders | Game statistics | Bengals |
|---|---|---|
| 22 | First downs | 17 |
| 40–124 | Rushes–yards | 16–58 |
| 158 | Passing yards | 226 |
| 14–30–1 | Passes | 26–35–1 |
| 3–25 | Sacked–yards | 4–23 |
| 133 | Net passing yards | 203 |
| 257 | Total yards | 261 |
| 60 | Return yards | 110 |
| 5–37.4 | Punts | 5–38.8 |
| 0–0 | Fumbles–lost | 4–2 |
| 8–65 | Penalties–yards | 8–74 |
| 35:37 | Time of possession | 24:23 |

Individual stats

Raiders Passing
| | C/ATT^{1} | Yds | TD | INT | Sk | Yds | LG^{3} | Rate |
|---|---|---|---|---|---|---|---|---|
| Plunkett | 14/29 | 158 | 0 | 1 | 3 | 25 | 26 | 50.6 |
| Allen | 0/1 | 0 | 0 | 0 | 0 | 0 | 0 | 39.6 |

Raiders Rushing
| | Car^{2} | Yds | TD | LG^{3} |
|---|---|---|---|---|
| Allen | 17 | 47 | 2 | 8 |
| King | 10 | 34 | 0 | 8 |
| Pruitt | 5 | 32 | 0 | 18 |
| Hawkins | 2 | 5 | 0 | 3 |
| Montgomery | 1 | 5 | 0 | 5 |
| Plunkett | 5 | 1 | 0 | 5 |

Raiders Receiving
| | Rec^{4} | Yds | TD | LG^{3} |
|---|---|---|---|---|
| Barnwell | 5 | 66 | 0 | 26 |
| Christensen | 3 | 35 | 0 | 18 |
| Allen | 3 | 19 | 0 | 10 |
| King | 2 | 17 | 0 | 10 |
| Branch | 1 | 11 | 0 | 11 |

Raiders Kick Returns
| | Ret | Yds | Y/Rt | TD | Lng |
|---|---|---|---|---|---|
| Pruitt | 2 | 25 | 12.5 | 0 | 0 |

Raiders Punt Returns
| | Ret | Yds | Y/Rt | TD | Lng |
|---|---|---|---|---|---|
| Pruitt | 3 | 21 | 7.0 | 0 | 0 |

Raiders Punting
| | Pnt | Yds | Y/P | Lng | Blck |
|---|---|---|---|---|---|
| Guy | 5 | 194 | 38.8 | | |

Raiders Kicking
| | FGM–FGA | XPM–XPA |
|---|---|---|
| Bahr | 2–2 | 2–2 |

Raiders Sacks
| | Sacks |
|---|---|
| Alzado | 2.0 |
| Pickel | 2.0 |

Raiders Interceptions
| | Int | Yds | TD | LG | PD |
|---|---|---|---|---|---|
| Millen | 1 | 14 | 0 | 14 | |

Starting Lineups

| Position | Starting Lineups at Cincinnati |
|---|---|
**Offense**
| WR | Cliff Branch |
| LT | Bruce Davis |
| LG | Charley Hannah |
| C | Dave Dalby |
| RG | Mickey Marvin |
| RT | Henry Lawrence |
| TE | Todd Christensen |
| WR | Malcolm Barnwell |
| QB | Jim Plunkett |
| FB | Kenny King |
| RB | Marcus Allen |
**Defense**
| LDE | Howie Long |
| NT | Reggie Kinlaw |
| RDE | Lyle Alzado |
| LOLB | Ted Hendricks |
| LILB | Matt Millen |
| RILB | Bob Nelson |
| ROLB | Rod Martin |
| LCB | Lester Hayes |
| RCB | Ted Watts |
| SS | Mike Davis |
| FS | Vann McElroy |

==== Week 2 (Sunday, September 11, 1983): vs. Houston Oilers ====
Week 2: Houston Oilers at Los Angeles Raiders – Game summary

| Quarter | 1 | 2 | 3 | 4 | Total |
|---|---|---|---|---|---|
| Oilers (0–2) | 0 | 3 | 3 | 0 | **6** |
| Raiders (2–0) | 6 | 7 | 0 | 7 | **20** |

at Los Angeles Memorial Coliseum • Los Angeles, California

- Date: September 11, 1983
- Game time: 1:00 p.m. PDT
- Game weather: 77 °F (25 °C); relative humidity 59%; wind 7 mph (11 km/h)
- Game attendance: 37,526
- Referee: Bob Frederic
- TV announcers (NBC): Don Criqui (play-by-play) and Jim Turner (color commentator)

| Team | Category | Player | Statistics |
|---|---|---|---|
| HOU | Passing | Archie Manning | 6/19, 107 YDS, 2 INTs |
| HOU | Rushing | Larry Moriarty | 6 CAR, 84 YDS |
| HOU | Receiving | Mike Holston | 3 REC, 35 YDS |
| RAI | Passing | Jim Plunkett | 19/28, 229 YDS, 1 TD, 2 INTs |
| RAI | Rushing | Marcus Allen | 17 CAR, 96 YDS |
| RAI | Receiving | Todd Christensen | 6 REC, 58 YDS, 1 TD |

Scoring summary

| Quarter | Time | Drive | | | Team | Scoring information | Score | |
| Quarter | Time | Plays | Yards | TOP | Team | Scoring information | HOU | RAI |
|---|---|---|---|---|---|---|---|---|
| 1 | 7:44 | | | | Raiders | King 2-yard touchdown run, Bahr kick no good | 0 | 6 |
| 2 | 1:12 | | | | Raiders | Pruitt 10-yard touchdown run, Bahr kick good | 0 | 13 |
| 2 | 0:23 | | | | Oilers | 40-yard field goal by Kempf | 3 | 13 |
| 3 | 1:57 | | | | Oilers | 38-yard field goal by Kempf | 6 | 13 |
| 4 | 14:11 | | | | Raiders | Christensen 2-yard touchdown reception from Plunkett, Bahr kick good | 6 | 20 |
| "TOP" = time of possession. For other American football terms, see Glossary of American football. | | | | | | | 6 | 20 |

- Point spread: Raiders −10
- Over/under: 44.0 **(under)**
- Time of game:

| Oilers | Game statistics | Raiders |
|---|---|---|
| 7 | First downs | 26 |
| 27–153 | Rushes–yards | 36–186 |
| 107 | Passing yards | 229 |
| 6–19–2 | Passes | 19–28–2 |
| 5–37 | Sacked–yards | 3–29 |
| 70 | Net passing yards | 200 |
| 177 | Total yards | 386 |
| 97 | Return yards | 46 |
| 6–37.3 | Punts | 2–38.5 |
| 1–0 | Fumbles–lost | 2–2 |
| 8–61 | Penalties–yards | 3–30 |
| 27:03 | Time of possession | 32:57 |

Individual stats

Raiders Passing
| | C/ATT^{1} | Yds | TD | INT | Sk | Yds | LG^{3} | Rate |
|---|---|---|---|---|---|---|---|---|
| Plunkett | 19/28 | 229 | 1 | 2 | 3 | 29 | 50 | 74.9 |

Raiders Rushing
| | Car^{2} | Yds | TD | LG^{3} |
|---|---|---|---|---|
| Allen | 17 | 96 | 0 | 19 |
| Pruitt | 3 | 41 | 1 | 16 |
| King | 9 | 27 | 1 | 7 |
| Hawkins | 4 | 23 | 0 | 10 |
| Plunkett | 2 | 0 | 0 | 3 |
| Willis | 1 | −1 | 0 | −1 |

Raiders Receiving
| | Rec^{4} | Yds | TD | LG^{3} |
|---|---|---|---|---|
| Christensen | 6 | 58 | 1 | 16 |
| Allen | 4 | 29 | 0 | 11 |
| Branch | 3 | 75 | 0 | 50 |
| King | 3 | 24 | 0 | 11 |
| Barnwell | 2 | 31 | 0 | 19 |
| Muhammad | 1 | 12 | 0 | 12 |

Raiders Kick Returns
| | Ret | Yds | Y/Rt | TD | Lng |
|---|---|---|---|---|---|
| Pruitt | 1 | 13 | 13.0 | 0 | 0 |
| Martin | 1 | 0 | 0.0 | 0 | 0 |

Raiders Punt Returns
| | Ret | Yds | Y/Rt | TD | Lng |
|---|---|---|---|---|---|
| Pruitt | 4 | 33 | 8.3 | 0 | 0 |

Raiders Punting
| | Pnt | Yds | Y/P | Lng | Blck |
|---|---|---|---|---|---|
| Guy | 2 | 77 | 38.5 | | |

Raiders Kicking
| | FGM–FGA | XPM–XPA | MFG |
|---|---|---|---|
| Bahr | 2–3 | 0–3 | 36, 41, 26 |

Raiders Sacks
| | Sacks |
|---|---|
| Alzado | 2.0 |
| Davis | 1.0 |
| Nelson | 1.0 |
| Reese | 1.0 |

Raiders Interceptions
| | Int | Yds | TD | LG | PD |
|---|---|---|---|---|---|
| Martin | 1 | 0 | 0 | 0 | |
| McElroy | 1 | 0 | 0 | 0 | |

Starting Lineups

| Position | Starting Lineups vs. Houston |
|---|---|
**Offense**
| WR | Cliff Branch |
| LT | Bruce Davis |
| LG | Charley Hannah |
| C | Dave Dalby |
| RG | Steve Sylvester |
| RT | Henry Lawrence |
| TE | Todd Christensen |
| WR | Malcolm Barnwell |
| QB | Jim Plunkett |
| FB | Kenny King |
| RB | Marcus Allen |
**Defense**
| LDE | Howie Long |
| NT | Reggie Kinlaw |
| RDE | Lyle Alzado |
| LOLB | Ted Hendricks |
| LILB | Matt Millen |
| RILB | Bob Nelson |
| ROLB | Rod Martin |
| LCB | Lester Hayes |
| RCB | Ted Watts |
| SS | Mike Davis |
| FS | Vann McElroy |

==== Week 3 (Monday, September 19, 1983): vs. Miami Dolphins ====
Week 3: Miami Dolphins at Los Angeles Raiders – Game summary

| Quarter | 1 | 2 | 3 | 4 | Total |
|---|---|---|---|---|---|
| Dolphins (2–1) | 0 | 0 | 0 | 14 | **14** |
| Raiders (3–0) | 7 | 6 | 7 | 7 | **27** |

at Los Angeles Memorial Coliseum • Los Angeles, California

- Date: September 19, 1983
- Game time: 6:04 p.m. PDT
- Game weather: 74 °F (23 °C); relative humidity 73%; wind 7 mph (11 km/h)
- Game attendance: 57,796
- Referee: Red Cashion
- TV announcers (ABC): Frank Gifford (play-by-play), Howard Cosell (color commentator) and O. J. Simpson (color commentator)

| Team | Category | Player | Statistics |
|---|---|---|---|
| MIA | Passing | Dan Marino | 11/17, 90 YDS, 2 INTs |
| MIA | Rushing | Andra Franklin | 11 CAR, 34 YDS |
| MIA | Receiving | Joe Rose | 5 REC, 52 YDS, 1 TD |
| RAI | Passing | Jim Plunkett | 11/15, 162 YDS, 1 TD |
| RAI | Rushing | Marcus Allen | 22 CAR, 105 YDS |
| RAI | Receiving | Todd Christensen | 6 REC, 95 YDS, 1 TD |

Scoring summary

| Quarter | Time | Drive | | | Team | Scoring information | Score | |
| Quarter | Time | Plays | Yards | TOP | Team | Scoring information | MIA | RAI |
|---|---|---|---|---|---|---|---|---|
| 1 | 2:53 | 9 | 61 | 4:53 | Raiders | Hawkins 2-yard touchdown run, Bahr kick good | 0 | 7 |
| 2 | 0:09 | 9 | 80 | 1:35 | Raiders | Christensen 14-yard touchdown reception from Plunkett, Bahr kick no good | 0 | 13 |
| 3 | 1:12 | — | — | — | Raiders | Fumble recovery returned 66 yards for touchdown by Townsend, Bahr kick good | 0 | 20 |
| 4 | 5:15 | 14 | 63 | 8:50 | Raiders | Pruitt 5-yard touchdown run, Bahr kick good | 0 | 27 |
| 4 | 2:29 | 12 | 66 | 2:38 | Dolphins | Rose 6-yard touchdown reception from Marino, von Schamann kick good | 7 | 27 |
| 4 | 0:20 | 9 | 54 | 2:05 | Dolphins | Duper 2-yard touchdown reception from Marino, von Schamann kick good | 14 | 27 |
| "TOP" = time of possession. For other American football terms, see Glossary of American football. | | | | | | | 14 | 27 |

- Point spread: Raiders —1½
- Over/under: 39.5 **(over)**
- Time of game: 2 hours, 57 minutes

| Dolphins | Game statistics | Raiders |
|---|---|---|
| 19 | First downs | 21 |
| 29—101 | Rushes–yards | 38—152 |
| 234 | Passing yards | 162 |
| 21—35—1 | Passes | 11—15—0 |
| 3—27 | Sacked–yards | 6—43 |
| 207 | Net passing yards | 119 |
| 308 | Total yards | 271 |
| 102 | Return yards | 36 |
| 5—45.8 | Punts | 4—47.3 |
| 2—1 | Fumbles–lost | 2—1 |
| 5—41 | Penalties–yards | 5—51 |
| 28:35 | Time of possession | 31:25 |

Individual stats

Raiders Passing
| | C/ATT^{1} | Yds | TD | INT | Sk | Yds | LG^{3} | Rate |
|---|---|---|---|---|---|---|---|---|
| Plunkett | 11/15 | 162 | 1 | 0 | 5 | 35 | 28 | 130.4 |
| Allen | 0/0 | 0 | 0 | 0 | 1 | 8 | 0 | |

Raiders Rushing
| | Car^{2} | Yds | TD | LG^{3} |
|---|---|---|---|---|
| Allen | 22 | 105 | 0 | 15 |
| King | 7 | 27 | 0 | 11 |
| Hawkins | 5 | 12 | 1 | 5 |
| Plunkett | 2 | 4 | 0 | 7 |
| Pruitt | 2 | 4 | 1 | 5 |

Raiders Receiving
| | Rec^{4} | Yds | TD | LG^{3} |
|---|---|---|---|---|
| Christensen | 6 | 85 | 1 | 28 |
| Barnwell | 2 | 35 | 0 | 20 |
| Branch | 1 | 16 | 0 | 16 |
| Allen | 1 | 10 | 0 | 10 |
| King | 1 | 6 | 0 | 6 |

Raiders Punt Returns
| | Ret | Yds | Y/Rt | TD | Lng |
|---|---|---|---|---|---|
| Pruitt | 3 | 26 | 8.7 | 0 | 0 |

Raiders Punting
| | Pnt | Yds | Y/P | Lng | Blck |
|---|---|---|---|---|---|
| Guy | 4 | 189 | 47.3 | | |

Raiders Kicking
| | FGM–FGA | XPM–XPA |
|---|---|---|
| Bahr | 3–4 | |

Raiders Sacks
| | Sacks |
|---|---|
| Martin | 2.0 |
| Pickel | 1.0 |

Raiders Interceptions
| | Int | Yds | TD | LG | PD |
|---|---|---|---|---|---|
| Davis | 1 | 10 | 0 | 10 | |

Starting Lineups

| Position | Starting Lineups vs. Miami |
|---|---|
**Offense**
| WR | Cliff Branch |
| LT | Bruce Davis |
| LG | Charley Hannah |
| C | Dave Dalby |
| RG | Steve Sylvester |
| RT | Henry Lawrence |
| TE | Todd Christensen |
| WR | Malcolm Barnwell |
| QB | Jim Plunkett |
| FB | Kenny King |
| RB | Marcus Allen |
**Defense**
| LDE | Howie Long |
| NT | Reggie Kinlaw |
| RDE | Lyle Alzado |
| LOLB | Ted Hendricks |
| LILB | Matt Millen |
| RILB | Bob Nelson |
| ROLB | Rod Martin |
| LCB | Lester Hayes |
| RCB | Ted Watts |
| SS | Mike Davis |
| FS | Vann McElroy |

==== Week 4 (Sunday, September 25, 1983): at Denver Broncos ====
Week 4: Los Angeles Raiders at Denver Broncos – Game summary

| Quarter | 1 | 2 | 3 | 4 | Total |
|---|---|---|---|---|---|
| Raiders (4–0) | 0 | 7 | 13 | 2 | **22** |
| Broncos (2–2) | 0 | 0 | 0 | 7 | **7** |

at Mile High Stadium • Denver, Colorado

- Date: September 25, 1983
- Game time: 1:00 p.m. PDT
- Game weather: 64 °F (18 °C); relative humidity 44%; wind 8 mph (13 km/h)
- Game attendance: 57,796
- Referee: Dick Jorgensen
- TV announcers (NBC): Marv Albert (play-by-play) and John Brodie (color commentator)

| Team | Category | Player | Statistics |
|---|---|---|---|
| RAI | Passing | Jim Plunkett | 13/24, 154 YDS, 2 TDs, 1 INT |
| RAI | Rushing | Marcus Allen | 15 CAR, 45 YDS |
| RAI | Receiving | Marcus Allen | 4 CAR, 20 YDS |
| DEN | Passing | Steve DeBerg | 8/21, 117 YDS, 1 INT |
| DEN | Rushing | Sammy Winder | 20 CAR, 119 YDS |
| DEN | Receiving | Steve Watson | 5 REC, 72 YDS |

External videos
- 1983 Raiders at Broncos - full broadcast

Scoring summary

| Quarter | Time | Drive | | | Team | Scoring information | Score | |
| Quarter | Time | Plays | Yards | TOP | Team | Scoring information | RAI | DEN |
|---|---|---|---|---|---|---|---|---|
| 2 | 7:11 | 2 | 36 | | Raiders | Branch 35-yard touchdown reception from Plunkett, Bahr kick good | 7 | 0 |
| 3 | 9:41 | | | | Raiders | 27-yard field goal by Bahr | 10 | 0 |
| 3 | 2:23 | | | | Raiders | 29-yard field goal by Bahr | 13 | 0 |
| 3 | 0:44 | | | | Raiders | Branch 17-yard touchdown reception from Plunkett, Bahr kick good | 20 | 0 |
| 4 | 1:42 | — | — | — | Broncos | Thomas 70-yard kickoff return for a touchdown, Karlis kick good | 20 | 7 |
| 4 | 0:54 | — | — | — | Raiders | DeBerg tackled in end zone for a safety by Townsend | 22 | 7 |
| "TOP" = time of possession. For other American football terms, see Glossary of American football. | | | | | | | 22 | 7 |

- Point spread: Raiders —3½
- Over/under: 34.0 **(under)**
- Time of game:

| Raiders | Game statistics | Broncos |
|---|---|---|
| 11 | First downs | 16 |
| 37–82 | Rushes–yards | 30–130 |
| 154 | Passing yards | 188 |
| 13–24–1 | Passes | 14–33–2 |
| 3–22 | Sacked–yards | 5–50 |
| 132 | Net passing yards | 138 |
| 214 | Total yards | 268 |
| 113 | Return yards | 122 |
| 9–46.1 | Punts | 8–42.6 |
| 3–0 | Fumbles–lost | 4–2 |
| 4–22 | Penalties–yards | 9–78 |
| 29:29 | Time of possession | 30:31 |

Individual stats

Raiders Passing
| | C/ATT^{1} | Yds | TD | INT | Sk | Yds | LG^{3} | Rate |
|---|---|---|---|---|---|---|---|---|
| Plunkett | 13/24 | 154 | 2 | 1 | 3 | 22 | 35 | 84.4 |

Raiders Rushing
| | Car^{2} | Yds | TD | LG^{3} |
|---|---|---|---|---|
| Allen | 15 | 45 | 0 | 9 |
| Hawkins | 6 | 17 | 0 | 8 |
| King | 6 | 17 | 0 | 9 |
| Pruitt | 4 | 5 | 0 | 2 |
| Willis | 4 | 1 | 0 | 4 |
| Plunkett | 2 | −3 | 0 | −1 |

Raiders Receiving
| | Rec^{4} | Yds | TD | LG^{3} |
|---|---|---|---|---|
| Allen | 4 | 20 | 0 | 9 |
| Branch | 3 | 63 | 2 | 35 |
| King | 3 | 37 | 0 | 18 |
| Barnwell | 2 | 25 | 0 | 19 |
| Christensen | 1 | 9 | 0 | 9 |

Raiders Kick Returns
| | Ret | Yds | Y/Rt | TD | Lng |
|---|---|---|---|---|---|
| Pruitt | 1 | 23 | 23.0 | 0 | 0 |

Raiders Punt Returns
| | Ret | Yds | Y/Rt | TD | Lng |
|---|---|---|---|---|---|
| Pruitt | 4 | 53 | 13.3 | 0 | 0 |

Raiders Punting
| | Pnt | Yds | Y/P | Lng | Blck |
|---|---|---|---|---|---|
| Guy | 9 | 415 | 46.1 | | |

Raiders Kicking
| | FGM–FGA | XPM–XPA |
|---|---|---|
| Bahr | 2–2 | 2–2 |

Raiders Sacks
| | Sacks |
|---|---|
| Townsend | 2.0 |
| Alzado | 1.0 |
| Hendricks | 1.0 |
| Reese | 1.0 |

Raiders Interceptions
| | Int | Yds | TD | LG | PD |
|---|---|---|---|---|---|
| McElroy | 2 | 37 | 0 | 0 | 0 |

Starting Lineups

| Position | Starting Lineups at Denver |
|---|---|
**Offense**
| WR | Cliff Branch |
| LT | Bruce Davis |
| LG | Charley Hannah |
| C | Dave Dalby |
| RG | Mickey Marvin |
| RT | Henry Lawrence |
| TE | Todd Christensen |
| WR | Malcolm Barnwell |
| QB | Jim Plunkett |
| FB | Kenny King |
| RB | Marcus Allen |
**Defense**
| LDE | Howie Long |
| NT | Reggie Kinlaw |
| RDE | Lyle Alzado |
| LOLB | Ted Hendricks |
| LILB | Matt Millen |
| RILB | Bob Nelson |
| ROLB | Rod Martin |
| LCB | Lester Hayes |
| RCB | Ted Watts |
| SS | Mike Davis |
| FS | Vann McElroy |

==== Week 5 (Sunday, October 2, 1983): at Washington Redskins ====
Week 5: Los Angeles Raiders at Washington Redskins – Game summary

| Quarter | 1 | 2 | 3 | 4 | Total |
|---|---|---|---|---|---|
| Raiders (4–1) | 0 | 7 | 14 | 14 | **35** |
| Redskins (4–1) | 7 | 10 | 3 | 17 | **37** |

at RFK Stadium • Washington, D.C.

- Game time: 10:00 a.m. PDT
- Game weather: 65 °F (18 °C); relative humidity 81%; wind 4 mph (6.4 km/h)
- Game attendance: 54,106
- Referee: Pat Haggerty
- TV announcers (NBC): Marv Albert (play-by-play) and John Brodie (color commentator)

| Team | Category | Player | Statistics |
|---|---|---|---|
| RAI | Passing | Jim Plunkett | 16/29, 372 YDS, 4 TDs, 4 INTs |
| RAI | Rushing | Frank Hawkins | 15 CAR, 64 YDS |
| RAI | Receiving | Calvin Muhammad; Todd Christensen | 5 REC, 112 YDS, 2 TDs; 5 REC, 70 YDS, 1 TD |
| WAS | Passing | Joe Theismann | 23/39, 417 YDS, 3 TDs |
| WAS | Rushing | John Riggins | 26 CAR, 91 YDS, 1 TD |
| WAS | Receiving | Charlie Brown | 11 REC, 180 YDS, 1 TD |

Scoring summary

| Quarter | Time | Drive | | | Team | Scoring information | Score | |
| Quarter | Time | Plays | Yards | TOP | Team | Scoring information | RAI | WAS |
|---|---|---|---|---|---|---|---|---|
| 1 | 10:23 | 3 | 11 | | Redskins | Riggins 2-yard touchdown run, Moseley kick good | 0 | 7 |
| 2 | 12:59 | 6 | 12 | | Redskins | 28-yard field goal by Moseley | 0 | 10 |
| 2 | 9:24 | 1 | 99 | | Raiders | Branch 99-yard touchdown reception from Plunkett, Bahr kick good | 7 | 10 |
| 2 | 5:28 | 7 | 80 | | Redskins | Washington 5-yard touchdown reception from Theismann, Moseley kick good | 7 | 17 |
| 3 | 10:28 | 8 | 46 | | Redskins | 29-yard field goal by Moseley | 7 | 20 |
| 3 | 6:29 | 3 | 83 | | Raiders | Muhammad 35-yard touchdown reception from Plunkett, Bahr kick good | 14 | 20 |
| 3 | 1:55 | 7 | 47 | | Raiders | Muhammad 22-yard touchdown reception from Plunkett, Bahr kick good | 21 | 20 |
| 4 | 11:50 | 9 | 65 | | Raiders | Christensen 2-yard touchdown reception from Plunkett, Bahr kick good | 28 | 20 |
| 4 | 7:31 | — | — | — | Raiders | Pruitt 97-yard kickoff return for a touchdown, Bahr kick good | 35 | 20 |
| 4 | 5:28 | 4 | 88 | | Redskins | Brown 11-yard touchdown reception from Theismann, Moseley kick good | 35 | 27 |
| 4 | 4:28 | 5 | 15 | | Redskins | 34-yard field goal by Moseley | 35 | 30 |
| 4 | 0:33 | 5 | 69 | | Redskins | Washington 6-yard touchdown reception from Theismann, Moseley kick good | 35 | 37 |
| "TOP" = time of possession. For other American football terms, see Glossary of American football. | | | | | | | 35 | 37 |

- Point spread: Raiders +2
- Over/under: 38.5 **(over)**
- Time of game:

| Raiders | Game statistics | Redskins |
|---|---|---|
| 19 | First downs | 25 |
| 24–105 | Rushes–yards | 32–98 |
| 372 | Passing yards | 417 |
| 16–30–4 | Passes | 23–40–0 |
| 5–46 | Sacked–yards | 6–56 |
| 326 | Net passing yards | 361 |
| 431 | Total yards | 459 |
| 248 | Return yards | 196 |
| 4–43.5 | Punts | 7–40.1 |
| 2–2 | Fumbles–lost | 1–1 |
| 8–70 | Penalties–yards | 8–84 |
| 25:12 | Time of possession | 34:48 |

Individual stats

Raiders Passing
| | C/ATT^{1} | Yds | TD | INT | Sk | Yds | LG^{3} | Rate |
|---|---|---|---|---|---|---|---|---|
| Plunkett | 16/29 | 372 | 4 | 4 | 5 | 46 | 99 | 100.1 |
| Pruitt | 0/1 | 0 | 0 | 0 | 0 | 0 | 0 | 39.6 |

Raiders Rushing
| | Car^{2} | Yds | TD | LG^{3} |
|---|---|---|---|---|
| Hawkins | 15 | 64 | 0 | 16 |
| King | 7 | 20 | 0 | 6 |
| Plunkett | 2 | 21 | 0 | 12 |

Raiders Receiving
| | Rec^{4} | Yds | TD | LG^{3} |
|---|---|---|---|---|
| Muhammad | 5 | 112 | 2 | 35 |
| Christensen | 5 | 70 | 1 | 41 |
| Barnwell | 3 | 75 | 0 | 39 |
| Branch | 1 | 99 | 1 | 99 |
| King | 1 | 9 | 0 | 9 |
| Hawkins | 1 | 7 | 0 | 7 |

Raiders Kick Returns
| | Ret | Yds | Y/Rt | TD | Lng |
|---|---|---|---|---|---|
| Pruitt | 6 | 119 | 19.8 | 0 | 0 |
| Montgomery | 1 | 21 | 21.0 | 0 | 0 |

Raiders Punt Returns
| | Ret | Yds | Y/Rt | TD | Lng |
|---|---|---|---|---|---|
| Pruitt | 4 | 108 | 27.0 | 1 | 0 |

Raiders Punting
| | Pnt | Yds | Y/P | Lng | Blck |
|---|---|---|---|---|---|
| Guy | 4 | 174 | 43.5 | | |

Raiders Kicking
| | FGM–FGA | XPM–XPA | MFG |
|---|---|---|---|
| Bahr | 5–5 | 0–1 | 41 |

Raiders Sacks
| | Sacks |
|---|---|
| Long | 5.0 |
| Townsend | 1.0 |

Starting Lineups

| Position | Starting Lineups at Washington |
|---|---|
**Offense**
| WR | Cliff Branch |
| LT | Bruce Davis |
| LG | Charley Hannah |
| C | Dave Dalby |
| RG | Mickey Marvin |
| RT | Henry Lawrence |
| TE | Todd Christensen |
| WR | Malcolm Barnwell |
| QB | Jim Plunkett |
| FB | Kenny King |
| RB | Frank Hawkins |
**Defense**
| LDE | Howie Long |
| NT | Reggie Kinlaw |
| RDE | Lyle Alzado |
| LOLB | Ted Hendricks |
| LILB | Matt Millen |
| RILB | Bob Nelson |
| ROLB | Rod Martin |
| LCB | Lester Hayes |
| RCB | Ted Watts |
| SS | Mike Davis |
| FS | Vann McElroy |

==== Week 6 (Sunday, October 9, 1983): vs. Kansas City Chiefs ====
Week 6: Kansas City Chiefs at Los Angeles Raiders – Game summary

| Quarter | 1 | 2 | 3 | 4 | Total |
|---|---|---|---|---|---|
| Chiefs (2–4) | 14 | 3 | 0 | 3 | **20** |
| Raiders (5–1) | 0 | 7 | 7 | 7 | **21** |

at Los Angeles Memorial Coliseum • Los Angeles, California

- Date: October 9, 1983
- Game time: 1:00 p.m. PDT
- Game weather: 68 °F (20 °C); relative humidity 75%; wind 9 mph (14 km/h)
- Game attendance: 40,492
- Referee: Jerry Markbreit
- TV announcers (KCTV): Don Fortune (play-by-play) and Len Dawson (color commentator)

| Team | Category | Player | Statistics |
|---|---|---|---|
| KC | Passing | Bill Kenney | 25/45, 272 YDS, 1 TD |
| KC | Rushing | Billy Jackson | 12 CAR, 33 YDS |
| KC | Receiving | Theotis Brown | 6 REC, 72 YDS |
| RAI | Passing | Jim Plunkett | 15/28, 123 YDS, 1 TD, 2 INTs |
| RAI | Rushing | Marcus Allen | 21 CAR, 53 YDS |
| RAI | Receiving | Marcus Allen | 6 REC, 58 YDS |

Scoring summary

| Quarter | Time | Drive | | | Team | Scoring information | Score | |
| Quarter | Time | Plays | Yards | TOP | Team | Scoring information | KC | RAI |
|---|---|---|---|---|---|---|---|---|
| 1 | 4:00 | | | | Chiefs | Paige 36-yard touchdown reception from Kenney, Lowery kick good | 7 | 0 |
| 1 | 3:20 | | | | Chiefs | Brown 1-yard touchdown run, Lowery kick good | 14 | 0 |
| 2 | 14:55 | | | | Raiders | Christensen 3-yard touchdown reception from Plunkett, Bahr kick good | 14 | 7 |
| 2 | 2:45 | | | | Chiefs | 32-yard field goal by Lowery | 17 | 7 |
| 3 | 11:15 | 9 | 65 | | Raiders | Williams 24-yard touchdown reception from Allen, Bahr kick good | 17 | 14 |
| 4 | 14:43 | | | | Chiefs | 39-yard field goal by Lowery | 20 | 14 |
| 4 | 8:29 | — | — | — | Raiders | Fumble recovery returned 0 yards for touchdown by Allen, Bahr kick good | 20 | 21 |
| "TOP" = time of possession. For other American football terms, see Glossary of American football. | | | | | | | 20 | 21 |

- Point spread: Raiders −9
- Over/under: 40.5 **(over)**
- Time of game:

| Chiefs | Game statistics | Raiders |
|---|---|---|
| 20 | First downs | 21 |
| 21–55 | Rushes–yards | 35–114 |
| 272 | Passing yards | 172 |
| 25–45–0 | Passes | 17–30–2 |
| 5–36 | Sacked–yards | 2–15 |
| 236 | Net passing yards | 157 |
| 291 | Total yards | 271 |
| 79 | Return yards | 184 |
| 7–48.0 | Punts | 8–45.5 |
| 2–2 | Fumbles–lost | 3–1 |
| 13–105 | Penalties–yards | 11–104 |
| 29:48 | Time of possession | 30:12 |

Individual stats

Raiders Passing
| | C/ATT^{1} | Yds | TD | INT | Sk | Yds | LG^{3} | Rate |
|---|---|---|---|---|---|---|---|---|
| Plunkett | 15/28 | 123 | 1 | 2 | 2 | 15 | 14 | 47.2 |
| Allen | 2/2 | 49 | 1 | 0 | 0 | 0 | 28 | 158.3 |

Raiders Rushing
| | Car^{2} | Yds | TD | LG^{3} |
|---|---|---|---|---|
| Allen | 21 | 53 | 0 | 13 |
| Hawkins | 10 | 46 | 0 | 9 |
| Plunkett | 3 | 14 | 0 | 8 |
| King | 1 | 1 | 0 | 1 |

Raiders Receiving
| | Rec^{4} | Yds | TD | LG^{3} |
|---|---|---|---|---|
| Allen | 6 | 58 | 0 | 14 |
| Christensen | 5 | 32 | 1 | 10 |
| Hawkins | 3 | 41 | 0 | 28 |
| Williams | 1 | 21 | 1 | 21 |
| Montgomery | 1 | 14 | 0 | 14 |
| Muhammad | 1 | 6 | 0 | 6 |

Raiders Kick Returns
| | Ret | Yds | Y/Rt | TD | Lng |
|---|---|---|---|---|---|
| Montgomery | 3 | 57 | 19.0 | 0 | 0 |
| Pruitt | 2 | 37 | 18.5 | 0 | 0 |

Raiders Punt Returns
| | Ret | Yds | Y/Rt | TD | Lng |
|---|---|---|---|---|---|
| Pruitt | 7 | 90 | 12.9 | 0 | 0 |

Raiders Punting
| | Pnt | Yds | Y/P | Lng | Blck |
|---|---|---|---|---|---|
| Guy | 8 | 364 | 45.5 | | |

Raiders Kicking
| | FGM–FGA | XPM–XPA |
|---|---|---|
| Bahr | 5–5 | |

Raiders Sacks
| | Sacks |
|---|---|
| Hendricks | 1.0 |
| Long | 1.0 |
| Millen | 1.0 |
| Nelson | 1.0 |
| Pickel | 1.0 |

Starting Lineups

| Position | Starting Lineups vs. Kansas City |
|---|---|
**Offense**
| WR | Cliff Branch |
| LT | Bruce Davis |
| LG | Charley Hannah |
| C | Dave Dalby |
| RG | Mickey Marvin |
| RT | Henry Lawrence |
| TE | Todd Christensen |
| WR | Malcolm Barnwell |
| QB | Jim Plunkett |
| FB | Kenny King |
| RB | Marcus Allen |
**Defense**
| LDE | Howie Long |
| NT | Reggie Kinlaw |
| RDE | Lyle Alzado |
| LOLB | Ted Hendricks |
| LILB | Matt Millen |
| RILB | Bob Nelson |
| ROLB | Rod Martin |
| LCB | Lester Hayes |
| RCB | Ted Watts |
| SS | Mike Davis |
| FS | Vann McElroy |

==== Week 7 (Sunday, October 16, 1983): at Seattle Seahawks ====
Week 7: Los Angeles Raiders at Seattle Seahawks – Game summary

| Quarter | 1 | 2 | 3 | 4 | Total |
|---|---|---|---|---|---|
| Raiders (5–2) | 7 | 10 | 5 | 14 | **36** |
| Seahawks (4–3) | 7 | 0 | 17 | 14 | **38** |

at The Kingdome • Seattle, Washington

- Date: October 16, 1983
- Game time: 1:02 p.m. PDT
- Game weather: 72 °F (22 °C), no wind
- Game attendance: 60,967
- Referee: Jim Tunney
- TV announcers (NBC): Marv Albert (play-by-play) and John Brodie (color commentator)

| Team | Category | Player | Statistics |
|---|---|---|---|
| RAI | Passing | Jim Plunkett | 14/22, 139 YDS, 1 TD, 3 INTs |
| RAI | Rushing | Marcus Allen | 18 CAR, 86 YDS |
| RAI | Receiving | Todd Christensen | 11 REC, 162 YDS, 3 TDs |
| SEA | Passing | Jim Zorn | 4/16, 13 YDS |
| SEA | Rushing | Curt Warner | 22 CAR, 75 YDS, 1 TD |
| SEA | Receiving | Dan Doornink | 2 REC, −6 Yds |

Scoring summary

| Quarter | Time | Drive | | | Team | Scoring information | Score | |
| Quarter | Time | Plays | Yards | TOP | Team | Scoring information | RAI | SEA |
|---|---|---|---|---|---|---|---|---|
| 1 | 10:28 | 6 | 47 | 3:08 | Raiders | Christensen 19-yard touchdown reception from Allen, Bahr kick good | 7 | 0 |
| 1 | 1:57 | 15 | 75 | 8:20 | Seahawks | Doornink 1-yard touchdown run, Johnson kick good | 7 | 7 |
| 2 | 9:26 | 9 | 40 | 5:19 | Raiders | 32-yard field goal by Bahr | 10 | 7 |
| 2 | 0:18 | 9 | 64 | 3:01 | Raiders | Christensen 12-yard touchdown reception from Plunkett, Bahr kick good | 17 | 7 |
| 3 | 13:16 | 3 | 21 | 0:34 | Seahawks | Zorn 18-yard touchdown run, Johnson kick good | 17 | 14 |
| 3 | 9:13 | — | — | — | Seahawks | Johns 75-yard kickoff return for a touchdown, Johnson kick good | 17 | 21 |
| 3 | 7:50 | 4 | 1 | 1:00 | Seahawks | 22-yard field goal by Johnson | 17 | 24 |
| 3 | 1:19 | 13 | 66 | 6:22 | Raiders | 42-yard field goal by Bahr | 20 | 24 |
| 3 | 0:50 | — | — | — | Raiders | −11-yard fumble, Pratt tackled in the end zone by Alzado for a safety | 22 | 24 |
| 4 | 8:23 | — | — | — | Seahawks | Fumble recovery returned 9 yards for touchdown by Robinson, Johnson kick good | 22 | 31 |
| 4 | 7:20 | 2 | 8 | 0:49 | Seahawks | Warner 6-yard touchdown run, Johnson kick good | 22 | 38 |
| 4 | 0:47 | 13 | 85 | 3:45 | Raiders | Allen 1-yard touchdown reception from Wilson, Bahr kick good | 29 | 38 |
| 4 | 0:12 | 2 | 55 | 0:35 | Raiders | Christensen 22-yard touchdown reception from Wilson, Bahr kick good | 36 | 38 |
| "TOP" = time of possession. For other American football terms, see Glossary of American football. | | | | | | | 36 | 38 |

- Point spread: Raiders −3
- Over/under: 43.5 **(over)**
- Time of game: 3 hours, 18 minutes

| Raiders | Game statistics | Seahawks |
|---|---|---|
| 24 | First downs | 13 |
| 30–183 | Rushes–yards | 44–151 |
| 264 | Passing yards | 13 |
| 23–34–3 | Passes | 4–16–0 |
| 8–65 | Sacked–yards | 1–11 |
| 199 | Net passing yards | 2 |
| 382 | Total yards | 153 |
| 59 | Return yards | 237 |
| 3–46.3 | Punts | 6–37.5 |
| 6–5 | Fumbles–lost | 2–1 |
| 5–45 | Penalties–yards | 5–84 |
| 33:13 | Time of possession | 26:47 |

Individual stats

Raiders Passing
| | C/ATT^{1} | Yds | TD | INT | Sk | Yds | LG^{3} | Rate |
|---|---|---|---|---|---|---|---|---|
| Plunkett | 14/22 | 139 | 1 | 3 | 8 | 65 | 19 | 57.0 |
| Wilson | 8/11 | 106 | 2 | 0 | 0 | 0 | 33 | 142.4 |
| Allen | 1/1 | 19 | 1 | 0 | 0 | 0 | 19 | 158.3 |

Raiders Rushing
| | Car^{2} | Yds | TD | LG^{3} |
|---|---|---|---|---|
| Allen | 18 | 86 | 0 | 16 |
| Hawkins | 5 | 40 | 0 | 8 |
| Plunkett | 4 | 27 | 0 | 20 |
| Wilson | 2 | 21 | 0 | 15 |
| Pruitt | 1 | 9 | 0 | 9 |

Raiders Receiving
| | Rec^{4} | Yds | TD | LG^{3} |
|---|---|---|---|---|
| Christensen | 11 | 152 | 3 | 22 |
| Allen | 5 | 25 | 1 | 12 |
| Williams | 2 | 39 | 0 | 33 |
| Hawkins | 2 | 3 | 0 | 2 |
| Barnwell | 1 | 19 | 0 | 19 |
| Montgomery | 1 | 15 | 0 | 15 |
| Muhammad | 1 | 11 | 0 | 11 |

Raiders Kick Returns
| | Ret | Yds | Y/Rt | TD | Lng |
|---|---|---|---|---|---|
| Pruitt | 3 | 36 | 12.0 | 0 | 0 |
| Montgomery | 2 | 23 | 11.5 | 0 | 0 |

Raiders Punt Returns
| | Ret | Yds | Y/Rt | TD | Lng |
|---|---|---|---|---|---|
| Pruitt | 2 | 0 | 0.0 | 0 | 0 |

Raiders Punting
| | Pnt | Yds | Y/P | Lng | Blck |
|---|---|---|---|---|---|
| Guy | 3 | 139 | 46.3 | | |

Raiders Kicking
| | FGM–FGA | XPM–XPA |
|---|---|---|
| Bahr | 4–4 | 2–2 |

Raiders Sacks
| | Sacks |
|---|---|
| Long | 1.0 |

Starting Lineups

| Position | Starting Lineups at Seattle |
|---|---|
**Offense**
| WR | Calvin Muhammad |
| LT | Bruce Davis |
| LG | Charley Hannah |
| C | Dave Dalby |
| RG | Mickey Marvin |
| RT | Henry Lawrence |
| TE | Todd Christensen |
| WR | Malcolm Barnwell |
| QB | Jim Plunkett |
| RB | Frank Hawkins |
| RB | Marcus Allen |
**Defense**
| LDE | Howie Long |
| NT | Reggie Kinlaw |
| RDE | Lyle Alzado |
| LOLB | Ted Hendricks |
| LILB | Matt Millen |
| RILB | Bob Nelson |
| ROLB | Rod Martin |
| LCB | Lester Hayes |
| RCB | Ted Watts |
| SS | Mike Davis |
| FS | Vann McElroy |

==== Week 8 (Sunday, October 23, 1983): at Dallas Cowboys ====
Week 8: Los Angeles Raiders at Dallas Cowboys – Game summary

| Quarter | 1 | 2 | 3 | 4 | Total |
|---|---|---|---|---|---|
| Raiders (6–2) | 10 | 21 | 3 | 6 | **40** |
| Cowboys (7–1) | 7 | 17 | 0 | 14 | **38** |

at Texas Stadium • Irving, Texas

- Date: October 23, 1983
- Game time: 6:00 p.m. PDT
- Game weather: 58 °F (14 °C), relative humidity 68%, wind 9 mph (14 km/h)
- Game attendance: 64,991
- Referee: Gene Barth
- TV announcers (ABC): Frank Gifford (play-by-play), Don Meredith (color commentator) and O. J. Simpson (color commentator)

| Team | Category | Player | Statistics |
|---|---|---|---|
| RAI | Passing | Marc Wilson | 26/49, 318 YDS, 3 TDs, 1 INT |
| RAI | Rushing | Frank Hawkins | 17 CAR, 118 YDS, 1 TD |
| RAI | Receiving | Todd Christensen; Marcus Allen | 7 REC, 90 YDS, 1 TD; 7 REC, 67 YDS |
| DAL | Passing | Danny White | 19/38, 240 YDS, 2 TDs, 2 INTs |
| DAL | Rushing | Tony Dorsett | 20 CAR, 65 YDS |
| DAL | Receiving | Butch Johnson; Doug Donley; Drew Pearson; Tony Hill | 3 REC, 54 YDS, 1 TD; 3 REC, 51 YDS, 1 TD; 3 REC, 49 YDS; 3 REC, 32 YDS |

Scoring summary

| Quarter | Time | Drive | | | Team | Scoring information | Score | |
| Quarter | Time | Plays | Yards | TOP | Team | Scoring information | RAI | DAL |
|---|---|---|---|---|---|---|---|---|
| 1 | 12:50 | 4 | 33 | 1:01 | Cowboys | White 15-yard touchdown reception from Springs, Septién kick good | 0 | 7 |
| 1 | 6:59 | 4 | 7 | 0:59 | Raiders | 37-yard field goal by Bahr | 3 | 7 |
| 1 | 1:35 | 7 | 45 | 3:35 | Raiders | Jensen 2-yard touchdown reception from Wilson, Bahr kick good | 10 | 7 |
| 2 | 13:45 | 4 | 38 | 1:04 | Cowboys | Springs 2-yard touchdown run, Septién kick good | 10 | 14 |
| 2 | 10:13 | 7 | 15 | 3:15 | Cowboys | 23-yard field goal by Septién | 10 | 17 |
| 2 | 9:04 | 4 | 56 | 3:37 | Raiders | Hawkins 23-yard touchdown run, Bahr kick good | 17 | 17 |
| 2 | 5:27 | 8 | 76 | 3:37 | Cowboys | Johnson 15-yard touchdown reception from White, Septién kick good | 17 | 24 |
| 2 | 2:19 | 11 | 78 | 3:08 | Raiders | Hawkins 17-yard touchdown reception from Wilson, Bahr kick good | 24 | 24 |
| 2 | 0:00 | 6 | 78 | 0:44 | Raiders | Christensen 1-yard touchdown reception from Wilson, Bahr kick good | 31 | 24 |
| 3 | 2:16 | 5 | 14 | 0:35 | Raiders | 24-yard field goal by Bahr | 34 | 24 |
| 4 | 14:47 | 9 | 82 | 2:27 | Cowboys | Donley 17-yard touchdown reception from White, Septién kick good | 34 | 31 |
| 4 | 13:05 | — | — | — | Cowboys | Fumble recovery returned 9 yards for touchdown by Hegman, Septién kick good | 34 | 38 |
| 4 | 9:40 | 11 | 67 | 3:20 | Raiders | 28-yard field goal by Bahr | 37 | 38 |
| 4 | 0:20 | 12 | 67 | 2:49 | Raiders | 26-yard field goal by Bahr | 40 | 38 |
| "TOP" = time of possession. For other American football terms, see Glossary of American football. | | | | | | | 40 | 38 |

- Point spread: Raiders +4
- Over/under: 46.0 **(over)**
- Time of game:

| Raiders | Game statistics | Cowboys |
|---|---|---|
| 31 | First downs | 17 |
| 37–219 | Rushes–yards | 27–81 |
| 318 | Passing yards | 255 |
| 26–50–1 | Passes | 20–39–2 |
| 2–18 | Sacked–yards | 2–17 |
| 300 | Net passing yards | 238 |
| 519 | Total yards | 319 |
| 260 | Return yards | 180 |
| 3–42.3 | Punts | 7–33.9 |
| 6–5 | Fumbles–lost | 1–1 |
| 10–68 | Penalties–yards | 5–52 |
| 29:25 | Time of possession | 30:35 |

Individual stats

Raiders Passing
| | C/ATT^{1} | Yds | TD | INT | Sk | Yds | LG^{3} | Rate |
|---|---|---|---|---|---|---|---|---|
| Wilson | 26/49 | 318 | 3 | 1 | 2 | 18 | 28 | 85.2 |
| Allen | 0/1 | 0 | 0 | 0 | 0 | 0 | 0 | 39.6 |

Raiders Rushing
| | Car^{2} | Yds | TD | LG^{3} |
|---|---|---|---|---|
| Hawkins | 17 | 118 | 1 | 32 |
| Allen | 15 | 55 | 0 | 11 |
| Wilson | 5 | 46 | 0 | 23 |

Raiders Receiving
| | Rec^{4} | Yds | TD | LG^{3} |
|---|---|---|---|---|
| Christensen | 7 | 90 | 1 | 28 |
| Allen | 7 | 67 | 0 | 17 |
| Williams | 4 | 66 | 0 | 18 |
| Branch | 2 | 30 | 0 | 19 |
| Barnwell | 2 | 26 | 0 | 18 |
| Hawkins | 2 | 20 | 1 | 17 |
| Muhammad | 1 | 17 | 0 | 17 |
| Jensen | 1 | 2 | 1 | 2 |

Raiders Kick Returns
| | Ret | Yds | Y/Rt | TD | Lng |
|---|---|---|---|---|---|
| Montgomery | 4 | 127 | 31.8 | 0 | 0 |
| Pruitt | 2 | 50 | 25.0 | 0 | 0 |

Raiders Punt Returns
| | Ret | Yds | Y/Rt | TD | Lng |
|---|---|---|---|---|---|
| Pruitt | 5 | 70 | 14.0 | 0 | 0 |

Raiders Punting
| | Pnt | Yds | Y/P | Lng | Blck |
|---|---|---|---|---|---|
| Guy | 3 | 127 | 42.3 | | |

Raiders Kicking
| | FGM–FGA | XPM–XPA |
|---|---|---|
| Bahr | 4–4 | 4–4 |

Raiders Sacks
| | Sacks |
|---|---|
| Millen | 1.0 |
| Reese | 1.0 |

Raiders Interceptions
| | Int | Yds | TD | LG | PD |
|---|---|---|---|---|---|
| Watts | 1 | 13 | 0 | 13 | 0 |
| McKinney | 1 | 0 | 0 | 0 | 0 |

Starting Lineups

| Position | Starting Lineups at Dallas |
|---|---|
**Offense**
| WR | Cliff Branch |
| LT | Bruce Davis |
| LG | Charley Hannah |
| C | Dave Dalby |
| RG | Mickey Marvin |
| RT | Henry Lawrence |
| TE | Todd Christensen |
| WR | Malcolm Barnwell |
| QB | Marc Wilson |
| RB | Frank Hawkins |
| RB | Marcus Allen |
**Defense**
| LDE | Howie Long |
| NT | Reggie Kinlaw |
| RDE | Lyle Alzado |
| LOLB | Ted Hendricks |
| LILB | Matt Millen |
| RILB | Bob Nelson |
| ROLB | Rod Martin |
| LCB | Lester Hayes |
| RCB | Ted Watts |
| SS | Mike Davis |
| FS | Vann McElroy |

==== Week 9 (Sunday, October 30, 1983): vs. Seattle Seahawks ====
Week 9: Seattle Seahawks at Los Angeles Raiders – Game summary

| Quarter | 1 | 2 | 3 | 4 | Total |
|---|---|---|---|---|---|
| Seahawks (5–4) | 0 | 17 | 7 | 10 | **34** |
| Raiders (6–3) | 0 | 7 | 7 | 7 | **21** |

at Los Angeles Memorial Coliseum • Los Angeles, California

- Date: October 30, 1983
- Game time: 1:02 p.m. PST
- Game weather: 68 °F (20 °C), relative humidity 76%, wind 7 mph (11 km/h)
- Game attendance: 49,708
- Referee: Jerry Seeman
- TV announcers (NBC): Dick Enberg (play-by-play) and Merlin Olsen (color commentator)

| Team | Category | Player | Statistics |
|---|---|---|---|
| SEA | Passing | Dave Krieg | 13/22, 156 YDS, 1 TD, 1 INT |
| SEA | Rushing | Curt Warner | 23 CAR, 101 YDS, 1 TD |
| SEA | Receiving | Paul Johns | 5 REC, 64 YDS |
| RAI | Passing | Marc Wilson | 22/34, 318 YDS, 2 TDs, 4 INTs |
| RAI | Rushing | Marc Wilson | 3 CAR, 35 YDS |
| RAI | Receiving | Marcus Allen | 8 REC, 104 YDS |

Scoring summary

| Quarter | Time | Drive | | | Team | Scoring information | Score | |
| Quarter | Time | Plays | Yards | TOP | Team | Scoring information | SEA | RAI |
|---|---|---|---|---|---|---|---|---|
| 2 | 14:57 | 13 | 65 | 5:50 | Raiders | Allen 1-yard touchdown run, Bahr kick good | 0 | 7 |
| 2 | 9:18 | — | — | — | Seahawks | Fumble recovery returned 12 yards for touchdown by Robinson, Johnson kick good | 7 | 7 |
| 2 | 3:49 | 10 | 46 | 2:59 | Seahawks | 37-yard field goal by Johnson | 10 | 7 |
| 2 | 0:12 | 6 | 65 | 1:37 | Seahawks | Young 5-yard touchdown reception from Krieg, Johnson kick good | 17 | 7 |
| 3 | 10:07 | 7 | 46 | 3:05 | Raiders | Hasselbeck 4-yard touchdown reception from Wilson, Bahr kick good | 17 | 14 |
| 3 | 5:09 | 10 | 65 | 4:58 | Seahawks | Warner 1-yard touchdown run, Johnson kick good | 24 | 14 |
| 4 | 11:49 | 9 | 80 | 5:32 | Seahawks | Hughes 33-yard touchdown reception from Zorn, Johnson kick good | 31 | 14 |
| 4 | 11:13 | 3 | 86 | 0:32 | Raiders | Williams 50-yard touchdown reception from Wilson, Bahr kick good | 31 | 21 |
| 4 | 4:03 | 7 | 15 | 3:21 | Seahawks | 44-yard field goal by Johnson | 34 | 21 |
| "TOP" = time of possession. For other American football terms, see Glossary of American football. | | | | | | | 34 | 21 |

- Point spread: Raiders −7
- Over/under: 54.5 **(over)**
- Time of game: 3 hours, 14 minutes

| Seahawks | Game statistics | Raiders |
|---|---|---|
| 20 | First downs | 22 |
| 40–183 | Rushes–yards | 27–125 |
| 189 | Passing yards | 297 |
| 14–23–1 | Passes | 22–34–4 |
| 4–20 | Sacked–yards | 5–42 |
| 169 | Net passing yards | 255 |
| 352 | Total yards | 380 |
| 124 | Return yards | 153 |
| 4–42.8 | Punts | 4–47.0 |
| 1–0 | Fumbles–lost | 4–1 |
| 3–20 | Penalties–yards | 6–55 |
| 33:51 | Time of possession | 26:09 |

Individual stats

Raiders Passing
| | C/ATT^{1} | Yds | TD | INT | Sk | Yds | LG^{3} | Rate |
|---|---|---|---|---|---|---|---|---|
| Wilson | 22/34 | 297 | 2 | 4 | 5 | 42 | 50 | 72.4 |

Raiders Rushing
| | Car^{2} | Yds | TD | LG^{3} |
|---|---|---|---|---|
| Marc Wilson | 3 | 35 | 0 | 18 |
| Allen | 13 | 30 | 1 | 9 |
| King | 5 | 25 | 0 | 10 |
| Hawkins | 5 | 23 | 0 | 12 |
| Barnwell | 1 | 12 | 0 | 12 |

Raiders Receiving
| | Rec^{4} | Yds | TD | LG^{3} |
|---|---|---|---|---|
| Allen | 8 | 104 | 0 | 36 |
| Christensen | 4 | 60 | 0 | 31 |
| Williams | 3 | 65 | 1 | 50 |
| Muhammad | 2 | 31 | 0 | 18 |
| Barnwell | 2 | 22 | 0 | 13 |
| King | 2 | 11 | 0 | 10 |
| Hasselbeck | 1 | 4 | 1 | 4 |

Raiders Kick Returns
| | Ret | Yds | Y/Rt | TD | Lng |
|---|---|---|---|---|---|
| Pruitt | 4 | 72 | 18.0 | 0 | 0 |
| Williams | 3 | 54 | 18.0 | 0 | 0 |

Raiders Punt Returns
| | Ret | Yds | Y/Rt | TD | Lng |
|---|---|---|---|---|---|
| Pruitt | 3 | 19 | 6.3 | 0 | 0 |

Raiders Punting
| | Pnt | Yds | Y/P | Lng | Blck |
|---|---|---|---|---|---|
| Guy | 4 | 188 | 47.0 | | |

Raiders Kicking
| | FGM–FGA | XPM–XPA |
|---|---|---|
| Bahr | 3–3 | |

Raiders Sacks
| | Sacks |
|---|---|
| Alzado | 1.0 |
| Kinlaw | 1.0 |
| Martin | 1.0 |
| Reese | 1.0 |

Starting Lineups

| Position | Starting Lineups vs. Seattle |
|---|---|
**Offense**
| WR | Calvin Muhammad |
| LT | Bruce Davis |
| LG | Charley Hannah |
| C | Dave Dalby |
| RG | Mickey Marvin |
| RT | Henry Lawrence |
| TE | Todd Christensen |
| WR | Malcolm Barnwell |
| QB | Marc Wilson |
| FB | Kenny King |
| RB | Marcus Allen |
**Defense**
| LDE | Howie Long |
| NT | Reggie Kinlaw |
| RDE | Lyle Alzado |
| LOLB | Ted Hendricks |
| LILB | Matt Millen |
| RILB | Bob Nelson |
| ROLB | Rod Martin |
| LCB | Lester Hayes |
| RCB | Ted Watts |
| SS | Mike Davis |
| FS | Vann McElroy |

==== Week 10 (Sunday, November 6, 1983): at Kansas City Chiefs ====
Week 10: Los Angeles Raiders at Kansas City Chiefs – Game summary

| Quarter | 1 | 2 | 3 | 4 | Total |
|---|---|---|---|---|---|
| Raiders (7–3) | 7 | 0 | 0 | 21 | **28** |
| Chiefs (4–6) | 0 | 6 | 7 | 7 | **20** |

at Arrowhead Stadium • Kansas City, Missouri

- Date: November 6, 1983
- Game time: 10:00 a.m. PST
- Game weather: 53 °F (12 °C), relative humidity 88%, wind 8 mph (13 km/h)
- Game attendance: 75,497
- Referee: Bob Frederic
- TV announcers (NBC): Charlie Jones (play-by-play) ad Bob Griese (color commentator)

| Team | Category | Player | Statistics |
|---|---|---|---|
| RAI | Passing | Marc Wilson | 11/23, 143 YDS, 1 TD, 1 INT |
| RAI | Rushing | Marcus Allen | 21 CAR, 64 YDS, 1 TD |
| RAI | Receiving | Dokie Williams; Todd Christensen; Malcolm Barnwell; Marcus Allen | 3 REC, 60 YDS, 1 TD; 3 REC, 46 YDS; 3 REC, 33 YDS; 3 REC, 31 YDS |
| KC | Passing | Bill Kenney | 2445, 292 YDS, 1 TD, 2 INTs |
| KC | Rushing | Billy Jackson | 15 CAR, 64 YDS |
| KC | Receiving | Carlos Carson; Billy Jackson | 5 REC, 103 YDS; 5 REC, 29 YDS |

Scoring summary

| Quarter | Time | Drive | | | Team | Scoring information | Score | |
| Quarter | Time | Plays | Yards | TOP | Team | Scoring information | RAI | KC |
|---|---|---|---|---|---|---|---|---|
| 1 | 7:03 | | | | Raiders | Hawkins 15-yard touchdown reception from Wilson, Bahr kick good | 7 | 0 |
| 2 | 0:56 | | | | Chiefs | 54-yard field goal by Lowery | 7 | 3 |
| 2 | 0:06 | | | | Chiefs | 48-yard field goal by Lowery | 7 | 6 |
| 3 | 2:37 | | | | Chiefs | Brown 1-yard touchdown run, Lowery kick good | 7 | 13 |
| 4 | 12:18 | | | | Raiders | Allen 1-yard touchdown run, Bahr kick good | 14 | 13 |
| 4 | 7:16 | | | | Chiefs | Thomas 2-yard touchdown reception from Kenney, Lowery kick good | 14 | 20 |
| 4 | 3:49 | | | | Raiders | Williams 19-yard touchdown reception from Plunkett, Bahr kick good | 21 | 20 |
| 4 | 0:03 | — | — | — | Raiders | Interception returned 40 yards for touchdown by Martin, Bahr kick good | 28 | 20 |
| "TOP" = time of possession. For other American football terms, see Glossary of American football. | | | | | | | 28 | 20 |

- Point spread: Raiders −3½
- Over/under: 45.0 **(over)**
- Time of game:

| Raiders | Game statistics | Chiefs |
|---|---|---|
| 22 | First downs | 20 |
| 33–91 | Rushes–yards | 24–81 |
| 257 | Passing yards | 292 |
| 16–32–1 | Passes | 24–45–2 |
| 4–25 | Sacked–yards | 2–16 |
| 232 | Net passing yards | 276 |
| 323 | Total yards | 357 |
| 177 | Return yards | 90 |
| 7–40.3 | Punts | 5–39.8 |
| 1–0 | Fumbles–lost | 1–1 |
| 5–27 | Penalties–yards | 5–34 |
| 29:55 | Time of possession | 30:05 |

Individual stats

Raiders Passing
| | C/ATT^{1} | Yds | TD | INT | Sk | Yds | LG^{3} | Rate |
|---|---|---|---|---|---|---|---|---|
| Wilson | 11/23 | 143 | 1 | 1 | 3 | 15 | 23 | 64.2 |
| Plunkett | 5/9 | 114 | 1 | 0 | 0 | 0 | 45 | 137.5 |
| Allen | 0/0 | 0 | 0 | 0 | 1 | 10 | 0 | |

Raiders Rushing
| | Car^{2} | Yds | TD | LG^{3} |
|---|---|---|---|---|
| Allen | 21 | 64 | 1 | 10 |
| Wilson | 3 | 20 | 0 | 12 |
| Hawkins | 4 | 5 | 0 | 6 |
| Plunkett | 2 | 5 | 0 | 5 |
| King | 2 | 0 | 0 | 1 |
| Guy | 1 | −3 | 0 | −3 |

Raiders Receiving
| | Rec^{4} | Yds | TD | LG^{3} |
|---|---|---|---|---|
| Williams | 3 | 60 | 1 | 28 |
| Christensen | 3 | 46 | 0 | 23 |
| Barnwell | 3 | 33 | 0 | 19 |
| Allen | 3 | 31 | 0 | 18 |
| Muhammad | 2 | 63 | 0 | 45 |
| Hawkins | 2 | 24 | 1 | 15 |

Raiders Kick Returns
| | Ret | Yds | Y/Rt | TD | Lng |
|---|---|---|---|---|---|
| Pruitt | 3 | 61 | 20.3 | 0 | 0 |
| Montgomery | 2 | 42 | 21.0 | 0 | 0 |

Raiders Punt Returns
| | Ret | Yds | Y/Rt | TD | Lng |
|---|---|---|---|---|---|
| Pruitt | 1 | 6 | 6.0 | 0 | 0 |

Raiders Punting
| | Pnt | Yds | Y/P | Lng | Blck |
|---|---|---|---|---|---|
| Guy | 7 | 282 | 40.3 | | |

Raiders Kicking
| | FGM–FGA | XPM–XPA |
|---|---|---|
| Bahr | 4–4 | |

Raiders Sacks
| | Sacks |
|---|---|
| Long | 1.0 |
| Squirek | 1.0 |

Raiders Interceptions
| | Int | Yds | TD | LG | PD |
|---|---|---|---|---|---|
| Martin | 1 | 40 | 1 | 40 | |
| Hayes | 1 | 28 | 0 | 28 | |

Starting Lineups

| Position | Starting Lineups at Kansas City |
|---|---|
**Offense**
| WR | Calvin Muhammad |
| LT | Bruce Davis |
| LG | Charley Hannah |
| C | Dave Dalby |
| RG | Mickey Marvin |
| RT | Henry Lawrence |
| TE | Todd Christensen |
| WR | Malcolm Barnwell |
| QB | Marc Wilson |
| FB | Kenny King |
| RB | Frank Hawkins |
**Defense**
| LDE | Howie Long |
| NT | Reggie Kinlaw |
| RDE | Lyle Alzado |
| LOLB | Ted Hendricks |
| LILB | Matt Millen |
| RILB | Bob Nelson |
| ROLB | Rod Martin |
| LCB | Lester Hayes |
| RCB | Ted Watts |
| SS | Mike Davis |
| FS | Vann McElroy |

==== Week 11 (Sunday, November 13, 1983): vs. Denver Broncos ====
Week 11: Denver Broncos at Los Angeles Raiders – Game summary

| Quarter | 1 | 2 | 3 | 4 | Total |
|---|---|---|---|---|---|
| Broncos (6–5) | 10 | 0 | 0 | 10 | **20** |
| Raiders (8–3) | 0 | 6 | 7 | 9 | **22** |

at Los Angeles Memorial Coliseum • Los Angeles, California

- Date: November 13, 1983
- Game time: 1:00 p.m. PDT
- Game weather: 63 °F (17 °C), relative humidity 78%, wind 9 mph (14 km/h)
- Game attendance: 51,945
- Referee: Red Cashion
- TV announcers (NBC): Don Criqui (play-by-play) and Merlin Olsen (color commentator)

| Team | Category | Player | Statistics |
|---|---|---|---|
| DEN | Passing | John Elway | 11/31, 190 YDS, 1 INT |
| DEN | Rushing | John Elway | 3 CAR, 32 YDS, 1 TD |
| DEN | Receiving | Rick Upchurch | 3 REC, 63 YDS |
| RAI | Passing | Jim Plunkett | 26/42, 252 YDS |
| RAI | Rushing | Marcus Allen | 18 CAR, 84 YDS, 1 TD |
| RAI | Receiving | Todd Christensen | 8 REC, 114 YDS |

Scoring summary

| Quarter | Time | Drive | | | Team | Scoring information | Score | |
| Quarter | Time | Plays | Yards | TOP | Team | Scoring information | DEN | RAI |
|---|---|---|---|---|---|---|---|---|
| 1 | 9:24 | | | | Broncos | 23-yard field goal by Karlis | 3 | 0 |
| 1 | 8:26 | — | — | — | Broncos | Fumble recovery returned 0 yards for touchdown by Chavous, Karlis kick good | 10 | 0 |
| 2 | 12:39 | | | | Raiders | 28-yard field goal by Bahr | 10 | 3 |
| 2 | 0:02 | | | | Raiders | 42-yard field goal by Bahr | 10 | 6 |
| 3 | 5:52 | | | | Raiders | Allen 7-yard touchdown run, Bahr kick good | 10 | 13 |
| 4 | 11:44 | | | | Raiders | Hawkins 17-yard touchdown run, Bahr kick no good (aborted) | 10 | 19 |
| 4 | 6:35 | | | | Broncos | 22-yard field goal by Karlis | 13 | 19 |
| 4 | 0:58 | | | | Broncos | Elway 4-yard touchdown run, Karlis kick good | 20 | 19 |
| 4 | 0:04 | | | | Raiders | 39-yard field goal by Bahr | 20 | 22 |
| "TOP" = time of possession. For other American football terms, see Glossary of American football. | | | | | | | 20 | 22 |

- Point spread: Raiders −7
- Over/under: 42.0 **(push)**
- Time of game:

| Broncos | Game statistics | Raiders |
|---|---|---|
| 14 | First downs | 23 |
| 25–63 | Rushes–yards | 29–140 |
| 190 | Passing yards | 252 |
| 11–31–1 | Passes | 26–43–0 |
| 2–21 | Sacked–yards | 5–52 |
| 169 | Net passing yards | 200 |
| 232 | Total yards | 340 |
| 91 | Return yards | 147 |
| 7–36.4 | Punts | 5–44.8 |
| 2–1 | Fumbles–lost | 3–3 |
| 5–29 | Penalties–yards | 7–57 |
| 26:30 | Time of possession | 33:30 |

Individual stats

Raiders Passing
| | C/ATT^{1} | Yds | TD | INT | Sk | Yds | LG^{3} | Rate |
|---|---|---|---|---|---|---|---|---|
| Plunkett | 26/42 | 252 | 0 | 0 | 5 | 52 | 17 | 78.7 |
| Allen | 0/1 | 0 | 0 | 0 | 0 | 0 | 0 | 39.6 |

Raiders Rushing
| | Car^{2} | Yds | TD | LG^{3} |
|---|---|---|---|---|
| Allen | 18 | 84 | 1 | 14 |
| Hawkins | 6 | 42 | 1 | 17 |
| King | 4 | 8 | 0 | 4 |
| Pruitt | 1 | 6 | 0 | 6 |

Raiders Receiving
| | Rec^{4} | Yds | TD | LG^{3} |
|---|---|---|---|---|
| Christensen | 8 | 114 | 0 | 17 |
| Branch | 6 | 52 | 0 | 13 |
| Allen | 6 | 49 | 0 | 16 |
| Hawkins | 4 | 21 | 0 | 12 |
| Barnwell | 1 | 10 | 0 | 10 |
| Pruitt | 1 | 6 | 0 | 6 |

Raiders Kick Returns
| | Ret | Yds | Y/Rt | TD | Lng |
|---|---|---|---|---|---|
| Pruitt | 3 | 49 | 16.3 | 0 | 0 |
| Williams | 1 | 17 | 17.0 | 0 | 0 |

Raiders Punt Returns
| | Ret | Yds | Y/Rt | TD | Lng |
|---|---|---|---|---|---|
| Pruitt | 5 | 80 | 16.0 | 0 | 0 |

Raiders Punting
| | Pnt | Yds | Y/P | Lng | Blck |
|---|---|---|---|---|---|
| Guy | 5 | 224 | 44.8 | | |

Raiders Kicking
| | FGM–FGA | XPM–XPA | MFG |
|---|---|---|---|
| Bahr | 1–1 | 3–4 | 28 |

Raiders Sacks
| | Sacks |
|---|---|
| Pickel | 1.0 |
| Townsend | 1.0 |

Raiders Interceptions
| | Int | Yds | TD | LG | PD |
|---|---|---|---|---|---|
| McElroy | 1 | 1 | 0 | 1 | 0 |

Starting Lineups

| Position | Starting Lineups vs. Denver |
|---|---|
**Offense**
| WR | Cliff Branch |
| LT | Bruce Davis |
| LG | Charley Hannah |
| C | Dave Dalby |
| RG | Mickey Marvin |
| RT | Henry Lawrence |
| TE | Todd Christensen |
| WR | Malcolm Barnwell |
| QB | Jim Plunkett |
| FB | Kenny King |
| RB | Marcus Allen |
**Defense**
| LDE | Howie Long |
| NT | Reggie Kinlaw |
| RDE | Lyle Alzado |
| LOLB | Ted Hendricks |
| LILB | Matt Millen |
| RILB | Bob Nelson |
| ROLB | Rod Martin |
| LCB | Lester Hayes |
| RCB | Ted Watts |
| SS | Mike Davis |
| FS | Vann McElroy |

==== Week 12 (Sunday, November 20, 1983): at Buffalo Bills ====
Week 12: Los Angeles Raiders at Buffalo Bills – Game summary

| Quarter | 1 | 2 | 3 | 4 | Total |
|---|---|---|---|---|---|
| Raiders (9–3) | 7 | 3 | 7 | 10 | **27** |
| Bills (7–5) | 0 | 3 | 0 | 21 | **24** |

at Rich Stadium • Orchard Park, New York

- Date: November 20, 1983
- Game time: 10:00 a.m. PST
- Game weather: 52 °F (11 °C), relative humidity 70%, wind 12 mph (19 km/h)
- Game attendance: 72,393
- Referee: Bob McElwee
- TV announcers (NBC): Don Criqui (play-by-play) and Gene Washington (color commentator)

| Team | Category | Player | Statistics |
|---|---|---|---|
| RAI | Passing | Jim Plunkett | 24/32, 232 YDS, 1 TD |
| RAI | Rushing | Marcus Allen | 26 CAR, 89 YDS, 1 TD |
| RAI | Receiving | Marcus Allen | 8 REC, 68 YDS |
| BUF | Passing | Matt Kofler | 9/14, 128 YDS, 2 TDs, 2 INTs |
| BUF | Rushing | Joe Ferguson | 1 CAR, 17 YDS |
| BUF | Receiving | Julius Dawkins; Joe Cribbs | 3 REC, 30 YDS; 3 REC, 12 YDS |

Scoring summary

| Quarter | Time | Drive | | | Team | Scoring information | Score | |
| Quarter | Time | Plays | Yards | TOP | Team | Scoring information | RAI | BUF |
|---|---|---|---|---|---|---|---|---|
| 1 | 7:50 | | | | Raiders | Hawkins 2-yard touchdown run, Bahr kick good | 7 | 0 |
| 2 | 4:04 | | | | Bills | 48-yard field goal by Danelo | 7 | 3 |
| 2 | 1:10 | | | | Raiders | 41-yard field goal by Bahr | 10 | 3 |
| 3 | 8:52 | | | | Raiders | Allen 4-yard touchdown run, Bahr kick good | 17 | 3 |
| 4 | 10:55 | | | | Raiders | Christensen 15-yard touchdown reception from Plunkett, Bahr kick good | 24 | 3 |
| 4 | 8:44 | | | | Bills | Hunter 23-yard touchdown reception from Kofler, Danelo kick good | 24 | 10 |
| 4 | 5:54 | | | | Bills | Cribbs 1-yard touchdown run, Danelo kick good | 24 | 17 |
| 4 | 3:41 | | | | Bills | Tuttle 28-yard touchdown reception from Kofler, Danelo kick good | 24 | 24 |
| 4 | 0:00 | | | | Raiders | 36-yard field goal by Bahr | 27 | 24 |
| "TOP" = time of possession. For other American football terms, see Glossary of American football. | | | | | | | 27 | 24 |

- Point spread: Raiders −2
- Over/under: 42.0 **(over)**
- Time of game:

| Raiders | Game statistics | Bills |
|---|---|---|
| 27 | First downs | 15 |
| 45–169 | Rushes–yards | 22–68 |
| 232 | Passing yards | 146 |
| 24–32–0 | Passes | 12–21–2 |
| 0–0 | Sacked–yards | 3–30 |
| 232 | Net passing yards | 116 |
| 401 | Total yards | 184 |
| 86 | Return yards | 33 |
| 3–37.7 | Punts | 5–37.0 |
| 4–3 | Fumbles–lost | 1–1 |
| 13–117 | Penalties–yards | 6–35 |
| 37:06 | Time of possession | 22:54 |

Individual stats

Raiders Passing
| | C/ATT^{1} | Yds | TD | INT | Sk | Yds | LG^{3} | Rate |
|---|---|---|---|---|---|---|---|---|
| Plunkett | 24/32 | 232 | 1 | 0 | 0 | 0 | 27 | 105.2 |

Raiders Rushing
| | Car^{2} | Yds | TD | LG^{3} |
|---|---|---|---|---|
| Allen | 26 | 89 | 1 | 9 |
| King | 7 | 46 | 0 | 16 |
| Pruitt | 3 | 29 | 0 | 18 |
| Hawkins | 8 | 15 | 1 | 4 |
| Guy | 1 | −10 | 0 | −10 |

Raiders Receiving
| | Rec^{4} | Yds | TD | LG^{3} |
|---|---|---|---|---|
| Allen | 8 | 68 | 0 | 11 |
| Christensen | 7 | 86 | 1 | 27 |
| Branch | 4 | 47 | 0 | 20 |
| Barnwell | 2 | 15 | 0 | 9 |
| Hawkins | 2 | 15 | 0 | 8 |
| King | 1 | 1 | 0 | 1 |

Raiders Kick Returns
| | Ret | Yds | Y/Rt | TD | Lng |
|---|---|---|---|---|---|
| Montgomery | 1 | 17 | 17.0 | 0 | 0 |
| Williams | 1 | 17 | 17.0 | 0 | 0 |
| Jensen | 1 | 0 | 0.0 | 0 | 0 |

Raiders Punt Returns
| | Ret | Yds | Y/Rt | TD | Lng |
|---|---|---|---|---|---|
| Pruitt | 3 | 28 | 9.3 | 0 | 0 |

Raiders Punting
| | Pnt | Yds | Y/P | Lng | Blck |
|---|---|---|---|---|---|
| Guy | 3 | 113 | 37.7 | | |

Raiders Kicking
| | FGM–FGA | XPM–XPA |
|---|---|---|
| Bahr | 3–3 | 2–2 |

Raiders Sacks
| | Sacks |
|---|---|
| Alzado | 1.0 |
| Martin | 1.0 |
| Pickel | 0.5 |
| Townsend | 0.5 |

Raiders Interceptions
| | Int | Yds | TD | LG | PD |
|---|---|---|---|---|---|
| Hayes | 1 | 21 | 0 | 21 | 0 |
| Davis | 1 | 3 | 0 | 3 | 0 |

Starting Lineups

| Position | Starting Lineups at Buffalo |
|---|---|
**Offense**
| WR | Cliff Branch |
| LT | Bruce Davis |
| LG | Charley Hannah |
| C | Dave Dalby |
| RG | Mickey Marvin |
| RT | Henry Lawrence |
| TE | Todd Christensen |
| WR | Malcolm Barnwell |
| QB | Jim Plunkett |
| FB | Kenny King |
| RB | Frank Hawkins |
**Defense**
| LDE | Howie Long |
| NT | Reggie Kinlaw |
| RDE | Lyle Alzado |
| LOLB | Ted Hendricks |
| LILB | Matt Millen |
| RILB | Bob Nelson |
| ROLB | Rod Martin |
| LCB | Lester Hayes |
| RCB | Ted Watts |
| SS | Mike Davis |
| FS | Vann McElroy |

==== Week 13 (Sunday, November 27, 1983): vs. New York Giants ====
Week 13: New York Giants at Los Angeles Raiders – Game summary

| Quarter | 1 | 2 | 3 | 4 | Total |
|---|---|---|---|---|---|
| Giants (3–9–1) | 2 | 3 | 0 | 7 | **12** |
| Raiders (10–3) | 0 | 13 | 7 | 7 | **27** |

at Los Angeles Memorial Coliseum • Los Angeles, California

- Date: November 27, 1983
- Game time: 1:00 p.m. PST
- Game weather: 54 °F (12 °C), relative humidity 41%, wind 7 mph (11 km/h)
- Game attendance: 41,473
- Referee: Fred Silva
- TV announcers (CBS): Pat Summerall (play-by-play) and John Madden (color commentator)

| Team | Category | Player | Statistics |
|---|---|---|---|
| NYG | Passing | Scott Brunner | 19/41, 346 YDS, 1 TD, 3 INTs |
| NYG | Rushing | Butch Woolfolk | 23 CAR, 52 YDS |
| NYG | Receiving | Earnest Gray; Byron Williams | 5 REC, 134 YDS; 5 REC, 119 YDS, 1 TD |
| RAI | Passing | Jim Plunkett | 19/32, 243 YDS, 2 TDs |
| RAI | Rushing | Marcus Allen | 13 CAR, 64 YDS, 1 TD |
| RAI | Receiving | Cliff Branch; Malcolm Barnwell | 5 REC, 83 YDS; 5 REC, 82 YDS, 1 TD |

Scoring summary

| Quarter | Time | Drive | | | Team | Scoring information | Score | |
| Quarter | Time | Plays | Yards | TOP | Team | Scoring information | NYG | RAI |
|---|---|---|---|---|---|---|---|---|
| 1 | 9:21 | — | — | — | Raiders | −2-yard fumble, Plunkett tackled in the end zone by Marshall for a safety | 2 | 0 |
| 2 | 8:33 | 10 | 80 | | Raiders | Hasselbeck 13-yard touchdown reception from Plunkett, Bahr kick good | 2 | 7 |
| 2 | 2:09 | 5 | 23 | | Raiders | 47-yard field goal by Bahr | 2 | 10 |
| 2 | 1:16 | 6 | 64 | | Giants | 31-yard field goal by Haji-Sheikh | 5 | 10 |
| 2 | 0:00 | 8 | 50 | | Raiders | 38-yard field goal by Bahr | 5 | 13 |
| 3 | 11:50 | 6 | 70 | | Raiders | Barnwell 36-yard touchdown reception from Plunkett, Bahr kick good | 5 | 20 |
| 4 | 11:30 | 6 | 47 | | Raiders | Allen 11-yard touchdown run, Bahr kick good | 5 | 27 |
| 4 | 9:37 | 4 | 80 | | Giants | Williams 43-yard touchdown reception from Brunner, Haji-Sheikh kick good | 12 | 27 |
| "TOP" = time of possession. For other American football terms, see Glossary of American football. | | | | | | | 12 | 27 |

- Point spread: Raiders −10
- Over/under: 41.0 **(under)**
- Time of game:

| Giants | Game statistics | Raiders |
|---|---|---|
| 20 | First downs | 22 |
| 24–58 | Rushes–yards | 32–138 |
| 346 | Passing yards | 243 |
| 19–41–3 | Passes | 19–32–0 |
| 7–63 | Sacked–yards | 0–0 |
| 283 | Net passing yards | 243 |
| 341 | Total yards | 381 |
| 61 | Return yards | 110 |
| 6–45.3 | Punts | 6–35.3 |
| 2–0 | Fumbles–lost | 3–0 |
| 5–49 | Penalties–yards | 9–69 |
| 30:52 | Time of possession | 29:08 |

Individual stats

Raiders Passing
| | C/ATT^{1} | Yds | TD | INT | Sk | Yds | LG^{3} | Rate |
|---|---|---|---|---|---|---|---|---|
| Plunkett | 19/32 | 243 | 2 | 0 | 0 | 0 | 36 | 104.0 |

Raiders Rushing
| | Car^{2} | Yds | TD | LG^{3} |
|---|---|---|---|---|
| Allen | 13 | 64 | 1 | 14 |
| Hawkins | 7 | 32 | 0 | 8 |
| King | 7 | 29 | 0 | 8 |
| Plunkett | 3 | 7 | 0 | 7 |
| Pruitt | 1 | 4 | 0 | 4 |
| Montgomery | 1 | 2 | 0 | 2 |

Raiders Receiving
| | Rec^{4} | Yds | TD | LG^{3} |
|---|---|---|---|---|
| Branch | 5 | 83 | 0 | 21 |
| Barnwell | 5 | 82 | 1 | 36 |
| Christensen | 4 | 46 | 0 | 21 |
| Allen | 4 | 19 | 0 | 9 |
| Hasselbeck | 1 | 13 | 1 | 13 |

Raiders Kick Returns
| | Ret | Yds | Y/Rt | TD | Lng |
|---|---|---|---|---|---|
| Montgomery | 2 | 43 | 21.5 | 0 | 0 |
| Pruitt | 1 | 22 | 22.0 | 0 | 0 |

Raiders Punt Returns
| | Ret | Yds | Y/Rt | TD | Lng |
|---|---|---|---|---|---|
| Pruitt | 3 | 28 | 9.3 | 0 | 0 |

Raiders Punting
| | Pnt | Yds | Y/P | Lng | Blck |
|---|---|---|---|---|---|
| Guy | 6 | 212 | 35.3 | | |

Raiders Kicking
| | FGM–FGA | XPM–XPA | MFG |
|---|---|---|---|
| Bahr | 3–3 | 2–3 | 52 |

Raiders Sacks
| | Sacks |
|---|---|
| Townsend | 3.0 |
| Davis | 1.0 |
| Long | 1.0 |
| Martin | 1.0 |
| Pickel | 0.5 |
| Stalls | 0.5 |

Raiders Interceptions
| | Int | Yds | TD | LG | PD |
|---|---|---|---|---|---|
| Martin | 1 | 12 | 0 | 12 | 0 |
| McElroy | 1 | 5 | 0 | 5 | 0 |
| Haynes | 1 | 0 | 0 | 0 | 0 |

Starting Lineups

| Position | Starting Lineups vs. N.Y. Giants |
|---|---|
**Offense**
| WR | Cliff Branch |
| LT | Bruce Davis |
| LG | Charley Hannah |
| C | Dave Dalby |
| RG | Mickey Marvin |
| RT | Henry Lawrence |
| TE | Todd Christensen |
| WR | Malcolm Barnwell |
| QB | Jim Plunkett |
| FB | Kenny King |
| RB | Marcus Allen |
**Defense**
| LDE | Howie Long |
| NT | Reggie Kinlaw |
| RDE | Lyle Alzado |
| LOLB | Ted Hendricks |
| LILB | Matt Millen |
| RILB | Bob Nelson |
| ROLB | Rod Martin |
| LCB | Lester Hayes |
| RCB | Ted Watts |
| SS | Mike Davis |
| FS | Vann McElroy |

==== Week 14 (Thursday, December 1, 1983): at San Diego Chargers ====
Week 14: Los Angeles Raiders at San Diego Chargers

| Quarter | 1 | 2 | 3 | 4 | Total |
|---|---|---|---|---|---|
| **Raiders (11–3)** | 0 | 14 | 28 | 0 | **42** |
| Chargers (5–9) | 7 | 3 | 0 | 0 | **10** |

at Jack Murphy Stadium, San Diego

- Date: December 1, 1983
- Game time: 9:00 p.m. (ET)/6:00 p.m. (PT)
- Game weather: 65 °F (18 °C), relative humidity 64%, wind 12 mph (19 km/h)
- Game attendance: 47,760
- Referee: Dick Jorgensen
- TV announcers (ABC): Frank Gifford (play-by-play), Howard Cosell & O. J. Simpson (color commentators)
- Pro-Football-Reference.com

Game information

**First quarter**

- SD – Muncie 5-yard pass from Fouts (Benirschke kick) – **Chargers 7–0**

**Second quarter**

- SD – Benirschke 24-yard field goal – **Chargers 10–0**
- LA – Christensen 43-yard pass from Allen (Bahr kick) – **Chargers 10–7**
- LA – Christensen 25-yard pass from Plunkett (Bahr kick) – **Raiders 14–10**

**Third quarter**

- LA – Hawkins 20-yard rush (Bahr kick) – **Raiders 21–10**
- LA – Hawkins 1-yard rush (Bahr kick) – **Raiders 28–10**
- LA – Martin 29-yard interception return (Bahr kick) – **Raiders 35–10**
- LA – Christensen 14-yard pass from Plunkett (Bahr kick) – **Raiders 42–10**

**Fourth quarter** No Score

**Vegas Odds**

- Vegas Line=LA −1.5 **(Won)**
- Over/Under=54.0 **(Under)**

**Raiders**

- Jim Plunkett
  14/28, 156 Yds, 2 TDs, INT
- Frank Hawkins
  8 Rush, 56 Yds, TD
- Todd Christensen
  8 Rec, 140 Yds, three touchdowns

**Chargers**

- Dan Fouts
  16/30, 186 Yds, TD, 2 INTs
- Chuck Muncie
  13 Rush, 47 Yds
- Charlie Joiner
  5 Rec, 72 Yds
  Chuck Muncie
  5 Rec, 40 Yds, TD

==== Week 15 (Sunday, December 11, 1983): vs. St. Louis Cardinals ====
Week 15: St. Louis Cardinals at Los Angeles Raiders

| Quarter | 1 | 2 | 3 | 4 | Total |
|---|---|---|---|---|---|
| **Cardinals** | 0 | 20 | 7 | 7 | **34** |
| Raiders | 17 | 7 | 0 | 0 | **24** |

at Los Angeles Memorial Coliseum • Los Angeles, California

- Date: December 11, 1983
- Game time: 1:00 p.m. PST
- Game weather: 56 °F (13 °C), relative humidity 70%, wind 5 mph (8.0 km/h)
- Game attendance: 32,111
- Referee: Fred Wyant
- TV announcers (CBS): Jim Kelly (play-by-play) and John Dockery (color commentator)
- Pro-Football-Reference.com

Game information

Vegas Odds

- Vegas Line=LA −9.0 **(Lost)**
- Over/Under=47.5 **(Over)**

Cardinals

- Neil Lomax
  17/24, 227 Yds, 2 TDs
- Ottis Anderson
  24 Rush, 119 Yds, TD
- Roy Green
  5 Rec, 86 Yds
  Ottis Anderson
  5 Rec, 61 Yds

Raiders

- Jim Plunkett
  19/31, 269 Yds, 3 TDs, 3 INTs
- Marcus Allen
  18 Rush, 86 Yds
- Todd Christensen
  6 Rec, 78 Yds

Game Length

- Time of Game:

Scoring summary

| Quarter | Time | Drive | | | Team | Scoring information | Score | |
| Quarter | Time | Plays | Yards | TOP | Team | Scoring information | STL | LA |
|---|---|---|---|---|---|---|---|---|
| 1 | 12:13 | 5 | 57 | | Raiders | King 34-yard touchdown reception from Plunkett, Bahr kick good | 0 | 7 |
| 1 | 7:05 | 6 | 72 | | Raiders | 22-yard field goal by Bahr | 0 | 10 |
| 1 | 0:12 | 10 | 45 | | Raiders | Branch 5-yard touchdown reception from Plunkett, Bahr kick good | 0 | 17 |
| 2 | 9:58 | 11 | 94 | | Cardinals | Anderson 1-yard touchdown run, O'Donoghue kick good | 7 | 17 |
| 2 | 3:13 | 12 | 79 | | Raiders | Allen 20-yard touchdown reception from Plunkett, Bahr kick good | 7 | 24 |
| 2 | 0:21 | 7 | 83 | | Cardinals | Marsh 1-yard touchdown reception from Lomax, O'Donoghue kick no good | 13 | 24 |
| 2 | 0:06 | — | — | — | Cardinals | Fumble recovery returned 40 yards for touchdown by Grooms, O'Donoghue kick good | 20 | 24 |
| 3 | 9:58 | 7 | 67 | | Cardinals | Morris 3-yard touchdown run, O'Donoghue kick good | 27 | 24 |
| 4 | 13:51 | 12 | 99 | | Cardinals | Tilley 15-yard touchdown reception from Lomax, O'Donoghue kick good | 34 | 24 |
| "TOP" = time of possession. For other American football terms, see Glossary of American football. | | | | | | | 34 | 24 |

==== Week 16 (Sunday, December 18, 1983): vs. San Diego Chargers ====
Week 16: San Diego Chargers at Los Angeles Raiders

| Quarter | 1 | 2 | 3 | 4 | Total |
|---|---|---|---|---|---|
| Chargers (6–10) | 7 | 0 | 7 | 0 | **14** |
| **Raiders (12–4)** | 7 | 6 | 3 | 14 | **30** |

at Los Angeles Memorial Coliseum, Los Angeles

- Date: December 18, 1983
- Game time: 4:00 p.m. (ET)/1:00 p.m. (PT)
- Game weather: 56 °F (13 °C), relative humidity 75%, wind 6 mph (9.7 km/h)
- Game attendance: 57,235
- Referee: Jim Tunney
- TV announcers (NBC): Marv Albert (play-by-play), Reggie Rucker (color commentator)
- Pro-Football-Reference.com

Game information

**First quarter**

- SD – Duckworth 40-yard pass from Luther (Benirschke kick) – **Chargers 7–0**
- LA – Allen 8-yard rush (Bahr kick) – **Tied 7–7**

**Second quarter**

- LA – Bahr 21-yard field goal – **Raiders 10–7**
- LA – Bahr 32-yard field goal – **Raiders 13–7**

**Third quarter**

- LA – Bahr 28-yard field goal – **Raiders 16–7**
- SD – Muncie 2-yard rush (Benirschke kick) – **Raiders 16–14**

**Fourth quarter**

- LA – Branch 4-yard pass from Plunkett (Bahr kick) – **Raiders 23–14**
- LA – Allen 5-yard rush (Bahr kick) – **Raiders 30–14**

**Vegas Odds**

- Vegas Line=LA −9.0 **(Won)**
- Over/Under=53.5 **(Under)**

**Chargers**

- Ed Luther
  20/36, 236 Yds, TD, INT
- Chuck Muncie
  18 Rush, 78 Yds, TD
- Chuck Muncie
  5 Rec, 43 Yds
  Kellen Winslow
  5, Rec, 40 Yds

**Raiders**

- Jim Plunkett
  21/30, 332 Yds, TD, INT
- Marcus Allen
  16 Rush, 72 Yds, 2 TDs
- Todd Christensen
  8 Rec, 136 Yds

== Standings ==
=== Division ===
AFC West
| | W | L | T | PCT | DIV | CONF | PF | PA | STK |
|---|---|---|---|---|---|---|---|---|---|
| ^{(1)} Los Angeles Raiders | 12 | 4 | 0 | .750 | 6–2 | 10–2 | 442 | 338 | W1 |
| ^{(4)} Seattle Seahawks | 9 | 7 | 0 | .563 | 5–3 | 8–4 | 403 | 397 | W2 |
| ^{(5)} Denver Broncos | 9 | 7 | 0 | .563 | 3–5 | 9–5 | 302 | 327 | L1 |
| San Diego Chargers | 6 | 10 | 0 | .375 | 4–4 | 4–8 | 358 | 462 | L1 |
| Kansas City Chiefs | 6 | 10 | 0 | .375 | 2–6 | 4–8 | 386 | 367 | W1 |

== Final statistics ==
=== Statistical comparison ===
| | Los Angeles Raiders | Opponents |
|---|---|---|
| First downs | 356 | 285 |
| First downs rushing | 143 | 86 |
| First downs passing | 181 | 170 |
| First downs penalty | 32 | 29 |
| Third down efficiency | 100/223 44.8% | 72/225 32.0% |
| Fourth down efficiency | 7/7 100.0% | / |
| Net yards rushing | 2240 | 1586 |
| Rushing attempts | 542 | 436 |
| Yards per rush | 4.1 | 3.6 |
| Passing – Completions/attempts | 301/504 | 282/531 |
| Times sacked-total yards | 55–464 | 57–484 |
| Interceptions thrown | 24 | 20 |
| Net yards passing | 3446 | 3162 |
| Total net yards | 5686 | 4748 |
| Punt returns-total yards | 58–664 | 35–334 |
| Kickoff returns-total yards | 61–1175 | 68–1227 |
| Interceptions-total return yards | 20–238 | 24–381 |
| Punts-average yardage | 78–42.8 | 100–40.6 |
| Fumbles-lost | 46–25 | 31–16 |
| Penalties-total yards | 121–992 | 109–947 |
| Time of possession | 30:58 | 29:02 |
| Turnovers | 49 | 36 |

Boxscore

Quarter-by-quarter
| | 1 | 2 | 3 | 4 | OT | T |
|---|---|---|---|---|---|---|
| Raiders | 75 | 131 | 108 | 128 | 0 | 442 |
| Opponents | 61 | 85 | 54 | 138 | 0 | 338 |

=== Individual leaders ===
Offense

Raiders Passing
| | C/ATT^{1} | Yds | TD | INT |
|---|---|---|---|---|
| Jim Plunkett | 230/379 | 2935 | 20 | 18 |
| Marc Wilson | 67/117 | 864 | 8 | 6 |
| Marcus Allen | 4/7 | 111 | 3 | 0 |
| Greg Pruitt | 0/1 | 0 | 0 | 0 |
Raiders Rushing
| | Car^{2} | Yds | TD | LG^{3} |
| Marcus Allen | 266 | 1014 | 9 | 19 |
| Frank Hawkins | 110 | 526 | 6 | 32 |
| Kenny King | 82 | 294 | 1 | 16 |
| Greg Pruitt | 26 | 154 | 2 | 18 |
| Marc Wilson | 13 | 122 | 0 | 23 |
| Jim Plunkett | 26 | 78 | 0 | 20 |
| Rick Berns | 6 | 22 | 0 | 13 |
| Cliff Branch | 1 | 20 | 0 | 20 |
| Malcolm Barnwell | 1 | 12 | 0 | 12 |
| Cleo Montgomery | 2 | 7 | 0 | 5 |
| Derrick Jensen | 1 | 5 | 0 | 5 |
| Chester Willis | 5 | 0 | 0 | 4 |
| David Humm | 1 | −1 | 0 | −1 |
| Ray Guy | 2 | −13 | 0 | −3 |
Raiders Receiving
| | Rec^{4} | Yds | TD | LG^{3} |
| Todd Christensen | 92 | 1247 | 12 | 45 |
| Marcus Allen | 68 | 590 | 2 | 36 |
| Cliff Branch | 39 | 696 | 5 | 99 |
| Malcolm Barnwell | 35 | 513 | 1 | 41 |
| Frank Hawkins | 20 | 150 | 2 | 28 |
| Dokie Williams | 14 | 259 | 3 | 50 |
| Kenny King | 14 | 149 | 1 | 34 |
| Calvin Muhammad | 13 | 252 | 2 | 45 |
| Cleo Montgomery | 2 | 29 | 0 | 15 |
| Don Hasselbeck | 2 | 17 | 2 | 13 |
| Greg Pruitt | 1 | 6 | 0 | 6 |
| Derrick Jensen | 1 | 2 | 1 | 2 |

^{1}Completions/attempts ^{2}Carries ^{3}Long gain ^{4}Receptions

Defense

Raiders Sacks
| | Sacks |
|---|---|
| Howie Long | 13.0 |
| Greg Townsend | 10.5 |
| Lyle Alzado | 7.0 |
| Rod Martin | 6.0 |
| Bill Pickel | 6.0 |
| Archie Reese | 4.0 |
| Mike Davis | 2.0 |
| Ted Hendricks | 2.0 |
| Matt Millen | 2.0 |
| Bob Nelson | 2.0 |
| Reggie Kinlaw | 1.0 |
| Jack Squirek | 1.0 |
| Dave Stalls | 0.5 |

Raiders Safety
| | Sfty |
|---|---|
| Lyle Alzado | 1 |
| Greg Townsend | 1 |

Raiders Interceptions
| | Int | Yds | TD | LG | PD |
|---|---|---|---|---|---|
| Vann McElroy | 8 | 68 | 0 | 28 | |
| Rod Martin | 4 | 81 | 2 | 40 | |
| Lester Hayes | 2 | 49 | 0 | 28 | |
| Matt Millen | 1 | 14 | 0 | 14 | |
| Ted Watts | 1 | 13 | 0 | 13 | |
| James Davis | 1 | 10 | 0 | 10 | |
| Mike Davis | 1 | 3 | 0 | 3 | |
| Mike Haynes | 1 | 0 | 0 | 0 | |
| Odis McKinney | 1 | 0 | 0 | 0 | |

Raiders Fumbles
| | FF | Fmb | FR | Yds | TD |
|---|---|---|---|---|---|
| Marcus Allen | | 14 | 2 | 0 | 1 |
| Greg Pruitt | | 10 | 7 | 0 | 0 |
| Jim Plunkett | | 7 | 3 | 0 | 0 |
| Marc Wilson | | 4 | 1 | 0 | 0 |
| Frank Hawkins | | 2 | 1 | 0 | 0 |
| Calvin Muhammad | | 2 | 0 | 0 | 0 |
| Dokie Williams | | 2 | 0 | 0 | 0 |
| Todd Christensen | | 1 | 1 | 0 | 0 |
| Derrick Jensen | | 1 | 0 | 0 | 0 |
| Kenny King | | 1 | 0 | 0 | 0 |
| Cleo Montgomery | | 1 | 0 | 0 | 0 |
| Chester Willis | | 1 | 0 | 0 | 0 |
| Vann McElroy | | 0 | 3 | 5 | 0 |
| Mike Davis | | 0 | 2 | 0 | 0 |
| Howie Long | | 0 | 2 | 0 | 0 |
| Greg Townsend | | 0 | 1 | 66 | 1 |
| Lyle Alzado | | 0 | 1 | 0 | 0 |
| Tony Caldwell | | 0 | 1 | 0 | 0 |
| Dave Dalby | | 0 | 1 | 0 | 0 |
| Bruce Davis | | 0 | 1 | 0 | 0 |
| James Davis | | 0 | 1 | 0 | 0 |
| Ted Hendricks | | 0 | 1 | 0 | 0 |
| Bob Nelson | | 0 | 1 | 0 | 0 |
| Bill Pickel | | 0 | 1 | 0 | 0 |
| Dave Stalls | | 0 | 1 | 0 | 0 |
| Ted Watts | | 0 | 1 | 0 | 0 |

Raiders Tackles
| Comb | Solo | Ast | TGL | QBHits |

Special teams

Raiders Kicking
| | 0–19 | 20–29 | 30–39 | 40–49 | 50+ | FGM–FGA | XPM–XPA |
|---|---|---|---|---|---|---|---|
| Chris Bahr | | 9–11 | 8–9 | 4–6 | 0–1 | 21–27 | 51–53 |

Raiders Punting
| | Pnt | Yds | Lng | Blck |
|---|---|---|---|---|
| Ray Guy | 78 | 3336 | 67 | 0 |

Raiders Kick Returns
| | Ret | Yds | TD | Lng |
|---|---|---|---|---|
| Greg Pruitt | 31 | 604 | 0 | 42 |
| Cleo Montgomery | 21 | 464 | 0 | 48 |
| Dokie Williams | 5 | 88 | 0 | 19 |
| Matt Millen | 2 | 19 | 0 | 10 |
| Derrick Jensen | 1 | 0 | 0 | 0 |
| Rod Martin | 1 | 0 | 0 | 0 |

Raiders Punt Returns
| | Ret | Yds | TD | Lng |
|---|---|---|---|---|
| Greg Pruitt | 58 | 666 | 1 | 97 |

Scoring

Raiders Scoring
| | RshTD | RecTD | PR TD | KR TD | FblTD | IntTD | OthTD | AllTD | XPM | XPA | FGM | FGA | Sfty | Pts |
|---|---|---|---|---|---|---|---|---|---|---|---|---|---|---|
| Chris Bahr | | | | | | | | | 51 | 53 | 21 | 27 | | 114 |
| Marcus Allen | 9 | 2 | | | 1 | | | 12 | | | | | | 72 |
| Todd Christensen | | 12 | | | | | | 12 | | | | | | 72 |
| Frank Hawkins | 6 | 2 | | | | | | 8 | | | | | | 48 |
| Cliff Branch | | 5 | | | | | | 5 | | | | | | 30 |
| Greg Pruitt | 2 | | 1 | | | | | 3 | | | | | | 18 |
| Dokie Williams | | 3 | | | | | | 3 | | | | | | 18 |
| Don Hasselbeck | | 2 | | | | | | 2 | | | | | | 12 |
| Kenny King | 1 | 1 | | | | | | 2 | | | | | | 12 |
| Rod Martin | | | | | | 2 | | 2 | | | | | | 12 |
| Calvin Muhammad | | 2 | | | | | | 2 | | | | | | 12 |
| Greg Townsend | | | | | 1 | | | 1 | | | | | 1 | 8 |
| Malcolm Barnwell | | 1 | | | | | | 1 | | | | | | 6 |
| Derrick Jensen | | 1 | | | | | | 1 | | | | | | 6 |
| Lyle Alzado | | | | | | | | | | | | | 1 | 2 |

== Postseason ==
=== Schedule ===
| Round | Date | Opponent (seed) | Result | Record | Venue | Attendance | Recap |
|---|---|---|---|---|---|---|---|
| Wild Card | First-round bye | | | | | | |
| Divisional | January 1 | Pittsburgh Steelers (3) | W 38–10 | 1–0 | Los Angeles Memorial Coliseum | 90,334 | Recap |
| AFC Championship | January 8 | Seattle Seahawks (4) | W 30–14 | 2–0 | Los Angeles Memorial Coliseum | 91,445 | Recap |
| Super Bowl XVIII | January 22 | Washington Redskins (N1) | W 38–9 | 3–0 | Tampa Stadium | 72,290 | Recap |

Notes:

^{a} All times are PACIFIC time.

==== AFC Divisional Playoffs (Sunday, January 1, 1984): vs. (3) Pittsburgh Steelers ====
AFC Divisional Playoffs: Pittsburgh Steelers at Los Angeles Raiders

| Quarter | 1 | 2 | 3 | 4 | Total |
|---|---|---|---|---|---|
| Steelers | 3 | 0 | 7 | 0 | 10 |
| Raiders | 7 | 10 | 21 | 0 | 38 |

at Los Angeles Memorial Coliseum • Los Angeles, California

- Date: January 1, 1984
- Game time: 1:00 p.m. PST
- Game weather: 61 °F (16 °C), relative humidity 64%, wind 6 mph (9.7 km/h) (Sunny)
- Game attendance: 90,334
- Referee: Gene Barth
- TV announcers (NBC): Dick Enberg (play-by-play), Merlin Olsen (color commentator) and Ahmad Rashad (sideline reporter)
- Pro-Football-Reference.com

Game information

Vegas Odds

- Vegas Line=LA −7.0 (Won)
- Over/Under=43.0 (Over)

Steelers

- Cliff Stoudt
  10/20, 187 Yds, TD, INT
- Cliff Stoudt
  9 Rush, 50 Yds
- Franco Harris
  4 Rec, 31 Yds

Raiders

- Jim Plunkett
  21/34, 232 Yds
- Marcus Allen
  13 Rush, 121 Yds, 2 TDs
- Todd Christensen
  7 Rec, 88 Yds

Game Length

- Time of Game:

Scoring summary

| Quarter | Time | Drive | | | Team | Scoring information | Score | |
| Quarter | Time | Plays | Yards | TOP | Team | Scoring information | PIT | LA |
|---|---|---|---|---|---|---|---|---|
| 1 | 8:19 | 8 | 78 | | Steelers | 17-yard field goal by Anderson | 3 | 0 |
| 1 | 5:31 | — | — | — | Raiders | Interception returned 18 yards for touchdown by Hayes, Bahr kick good | 3 | 7 |
| 2 | 11:33 | 9 | 80 | | Raiders | Allen 4-yard touchdown run, Bahr kick good | 3 | 14 |
| 2 | 0:06 | 7 | 43 | | Raiders | 43-yard field goal by Bahr | 3 | 17 |
| 3 | 10:05 | 8 | 72 | | Raiders | King 9-yard touchdown run, Bahr kick good | 3 | 24 |
| 3 | 6:46 | 2 | 58 | | Raiders | Allen 49-yard touchdown run, Bahr kick good | 3 | 31 |
| 3 | 5:27 | 4 | 80 | | Steelers | Stallworth 58-yard touchdown reception from Stoudt, Anderson kick good | 10 | 31 |
| 3 | 0:46 | 10 | 65 | | Raiders | Hawkins 2-yard touchdown run, Bahr kick good | 10 | 38 |
| "TOP" = time of possession. For other American football terms, see Glossary of American football. | | | | | | | 10 | 38 |

The Raiders scored 3 touchdowns in the third quarter en route to a 38–10 win over the Steelers. In the first quarter, Pittsburgh advanced on a 78-yard drive, but when faced with fourth down and inches near the goal line, they opted for kicker Gary Anderson's 17-yard field goal. But the Raiders controlled the rest of the game, as Lester Hayes returned an interception 18 yards for a touchdown. A 4-yard touchdown by running back Marcus Allen and a 45-yard field goal gave the Raiders a 17–3 lead. The Raiders then scored three touchdowns in the third period, including Allen's 49-yard run. Allen finished the game with 121 rushing yards and 2 touchdowns on just 13 carries, while also catching 5 passes for 38 yards. The Steelers' lone score in the second half was wide receiver John Stallworth's 58-yard touchdown reception. Raiders go to the AFC Championship Game and win to the Seattle Seahawks 30–14. And win Super Bowl XVIII to the Redskins 38–9.

==== 1983 AFC Championship Game (Sunday, January 8, 1984): vs. (4) Seattle Seahawks ====
1983 AFC Championship Game: Seattle Seahawks at Los Angeles Raiders – Game summary

| Quarter | 1 | 2 | 3 | 4 | Total |
|---|---|---|---|---|---|
| Seahawks (2–1) | 0 | 0 | 7 | 7 | 14 |
| Raiders (2–0) | 3 | 17 | 7 | 3 | 30 |

at Los Angeles Memorial Coliseum • Los Angeles, California

- Date: January 8, 1984
- Game time: 1:04 p.m. PST
- Game weather: 56 °F (13 °C), relative humidity 81%, wind 8 mph (13 km/h) (Overcast)
- Game attendance: 91,445
- Referee: Dick Jorgensen
- TV announcers (NBC): Dick Enberg (play-by-play), Merlin Olsen (color commentator) and Ahmad Rashad (sideline reporter)

| Team | Category | Player | Statistics |
|---|---|---|---|
| SEA | Passing | Jim Zorn | 14/27, 134 YDS, 2 TDs, 2 INTs |
| SEA | Rushing | Curt Warner | 11 CAR, 26 YDS |
| SEA | Receiving | Dan Doornink | 6 REC, 48 YDS, 1 TD |
| RAI | Passing | Jim Plunkett | 17/24, 214 YDS, 1 TD, 2 INTs |
| RAI | Rushing | Marcus Allen | 25 CAR, 154 YDS |
| RAI | Receiving | Marcus Allen | 7 REC, 62 YDS, 1 TD |

Scoring summary

| Quarter | Time | Drive | | | Team | Scoring information | Score | |
| Quarter | Time | Plays | Yards | TOP | Team | Scoring information | SEA | RAI |
|---|---|---|---|---|---|---|---|---|
| 1 | 8:47 | 6 | 23 | 2:43 | Raiders | 20-yard field goal by Bahr | 0 | 3 |
| 2 | 8:57 | 9 | 61 | 4:17 | Raiders | Hawkins 1-yard touchdown run, Bahr kick good | 0 | 10 |
| 2 | 1:06 | 4 | 60 | 4:17 | Raiders | Hawkins 5-yard touchdown run, Bahr kick good | 0 | 17 |
| 2 | 0:03 | 5 | 33 | 0:38 | Raiders | 45-yard field goal by Bahr | 0 | 20 |
| 3 | 6:49 | 2 | 46 | 1:09 | Raiders | Allen 3-yard touchdown reception from Plunkett, Bahr kick good | 0 | 27 |
| 3 | 4:01 | 10 | 74 | 2:58 | Seahawks | Doornink 11-yard touchdown reception from Zorn, Johnson kick good | 7 | 27 |
| 4 | 3:57 | 7 | 19 | 3:49 | Raiders | 35-yard field goal by Bahr | 7 | 30 |
| 4 | 1:16 | 9 | 71 | 2:41 | Seahawks | Young 9-yard touchdown reception from Zorn, Johnson kick good | 14 | 30 |
| "TOP" = time of possession. For other American football terms, see Glossary of American football. | | | | | | | 14 | 30 |

- Point spread: Raiders −7
- Over/under: 47.0 (under)
- Time of game: 3 hours, 13 minutes

| Seahawks | Game statistics | Raiders |
|---|---|---|
| 16 | First downs | 21 |
| 18–65 | Rushes–yards | 46–205 |
| 146 | Passing yards | 214 |
| 17–36–5 | Passes | 17–24–2 |
| 4–44 | Sacked–yards | 2–18 |
| 102 | Net passing yards | 196 |
| 167 | Total yards | 401 |
| 144 | Return yards | 100 |
| 5–32.0 | Punts | 2–34.0 |
| 1–0 | Fumbles–lost | 3–2 |
| 2–20 | Penalties–yards | 7–53 |
| 22:54 | Time of possession | 37:06 |

Individual stats

Raiders Passing
| | C/ATT^{1} | Yds | TD | INT | Sk | Yds | LG^{3} | Rate |
|---|---|---|---|---|---|---|---|---|
| Plunkett | 17/24 | 214 | 1 | 2 | 2 | 18 | 49 | 77.4 |

Raiders Rushing
| | Car^{2} | Yds | TD | LG^{3} |
|---|---|---|---|---|
| Allen | 25 | 154 | 0 | 43 |
| Plunkett | 7 | 26 | 0 | 10 |
| Hawkins | 10 | 24 | 2 | 8 |
| Pruitt | 1 | 4 | 0 | 4 |
| King | 2 | 0 | 0 | 0 |
| Wilson | 1 | −3 | 0 | −3 |

Raiders Receiving
| | Rec^{4} | Yds | TD | LG^{3} |
|---|---|---|---|---|
| Allen | 7 | 62 | 1 | 16 |
| Barnwell | 5 | 116 | 0 | 49 |
| Christensen | 3 | 14 | 0 | 6 |
| Branch | 2 | 22 | 0 | 11 |

Raiders Kickoff Returns
| | Ret | Yds | Y/Rt | TD | Lng |
|---|---|---|---|---|---|
| Montgomery | 2 | 46 | 23.0 | 0 | 27 |

Raiders Punt Returns
| | Ret | Yds | Y/Rt | TD | Lng |
|---|---|---|---|---|---|
| Pruitt | 1 | 1 | 1.0 | 0 | 1 |

Raiders Punting
| | Pnt | Yds | Y/P | Lng | Blck |
|---|---|---|---|---|---|
| Guy | 2 | 68 | 34.0 | 55 | |

Raiders Kicking
| | FGM–FGA | XPM–XPA |
|---|---|---|
| Bahr | 3–3 | 3–3 |

Raiders Sacks
| | Sacks |
|---|---|
| Townsend | 2.0 |
| Martin | 1.0 |
| Pickel | 1.0 |

Raiders Interceptions
| | Int | Yds | TD | LG | PD |
|---|---|---|---|---|---|
| Davis | 2 | 2 | 0 | 2 | |
| Hayes | 1 | 44 | 0 | 44 | |
| Millen | 1 | 13 | 0 | 13 | |
| McElroy | 1 | −6 | 0 | −6 | |

Starting Lineups

| Position | Starting Lineups vs. Seattle (1983 AFC Championship Game) |
|---|---|
Offense
| WR | Cliff Branch |
| LT | Bruce Davis |
| LG | Charley Hannah |
| C | Dave Dalby |
| RG | Mickey Marvin |
| RT | Henry Lawrence |
| TE | Todd Christensen |
| WR | Malcolm Barnwell |
| QB | Jim Plunkett |
| TE | Don Hasselbeck |
| RB | Marcus Allen |
Defense
| LDE | Howie Long |
| NT | Reggie Kinlaw |
| RDE | Lyle Alzado |
| LOLB | Ted Hendricks |
| LILB | Matt Millen |
| RILB | Bob Nelson |
| ROLB | Rod Martin |
| LCB | Lester Hayes |
| RCB | Mike Haynes |
| SS | Mike Davis |
| FS | Vann McElroy |

Seattle had defeated Los Angeles twice during the regular season, but this game had a very different outcome.

The Raiders jumped to a 20–0 halftime lead en route to a 30–14 victory. The Seahawks were held to 65 rushing yards while Raiders Running back Marcus Allen ran for 154 yards, caught 7 passes for 62 yards, and scored 2 touchdowns. Lester Hayes' interception on Seattle's first drive of the game set up a 20-yard field goal. In the second quarter, Raiders running back Frank Hawkins then scored two touchdowns. In the second half, Seahawks starting quarterback Dave Krieg was benched and replaced by Jim Zorn. Zorn threw two touchdown passes, but it was not enough as Allen's 3-yard touchdown reception and another Raiders field goal put the game away. Seahawks running back Curt Warner, the AFC's leading rusher during the regular season, was held to just 26 yards on 11 carries. Raiders go to Super Bowl XVIII to the Washington Redskins 38–9.

==== Super Bowl XVIII (Sunday, January 22, 1984): vs. (N1) Washington Redskins ====
Super Bowl XVIII: Washington Redskins vs. Los Angeles Raiders – Game summary

| Quarter | 1 | 2 | 3 | 4 | Total |
|---|---|---|---|---|---|
| Redskins (2–1) | 0 | 3 | 6 | 0 | 9 |
| Raiders (3–0) | 7 | 14 | 14 | 3 | 38 |

at Tampa Stadium • Tampa, Florida

- Date: January 22, 1984
- Game time: 1:45 p.m. PST
- Game weather: 51 °F (11 °C), relative humidity 63%, wind 16 mph (26 km/h) (Partly cloudy)
- Game attendance: 72,920
- Referee: Gene Barth
- TV announcers (CBS): Pat Summerall (play-by-play), John Madden (color commentator) and Jim Hill (sideline reporter)

| Team | Category | Player | Statistics |
|---|---|---|---|
| WAS | Passing | Joe Theismann | 16/35, 243 YDS, 2 INTs |
| WAS | Rushing | John Riggins | 26 CAR, 64 YDS, 1 TD |
| WAS | Receiving | Clint Didier | 5 REC, 65 YDS |
| RAI | Passing | Jim Plunkett | 16/25, 172 YDS, TD |
| RAI | Rushing | Marcus Allen | 20 CAR, 191 YDS, 2 TDs |
| RAI | Receiving | Cliff Branch | 6 REC, 94 YDS, 1 TD |

Scoring summary

| Quarter | Time | Drive | | | Team | Scoring information | Score | |
| Quarter | Time | Plays | Yards | TOP | Team | Scoring information | WAS | RAI |
|---|---|---|---|---|---|---|---|---|
| 1 | 10:08 | — | — | — | Raiders | Jensen recovered blocked punt in end zone, Bahr kick good | 0 | 7 |
| 2 | 9:14 | 3 | 65 | 1:34 | Raiders | Branch 12-yard touchdown reception from Plunkett, Bahr kick good | 0 | 14 |
| 2 | 3:05 | 13 | 73 | 6:09 | Redskins | 24-yard field goal by Moseley | 3 | 14 |
| 2 | 0:07 | — | — | — | Raiders | Interception returned 5 yards for touchdown by Squirek, Bahr kick good | 3 | 21 |
| 3 | 10:52 | 9 | 70 | 4:08 | Redskins | Riggins 1-yard touchdown run, Moseley kick no good (blocked) | 9 | 21 |
| 3 | 7:06 | 8 | 70 | 3:46 | Raiders | Allen 5-yard touchdown run, Bahr kick good | 9 | 28 |
| 3 | 0:00 | 1 | 74 | 0:12 | Raiders | Allen 74-yard touchdown run, Bahr kick good | 9 | 35 |
| 4 | 2:24 | 8 | 55 | 3:55 | Raiders | 21-yard field goal by Bahr | 9 | 38 |
| "TOP" = time of possession. For other American football terms, see Glossary of American football. | | | | | | | 9 | 38 |

- Point spread: Raiders +2
- Over/under: 48.0 (under)
- Time of game: 3 hours, 31 minutes

| Redskins | Game statistics | Raiders |
|---|---|---|
| 19 | First downs | 18 |
| 32–90 | Rushes–yards | 33–231 |
| 243 | Passing yards | 172 |
| 16–35–2 | Passes | 16–25–0 |
| 6–50 | Sacked–yards | 2–18 |
| 193 | Net passing yards | 154 |
| 283 | Total yards | 385 |
| 167 | Return yards | 30 |
| 7–37.0 | Punts | 7–42.7 |
| 1–1 | Fumbles–lost | 3–2 |
| 4–62 | Penalties–yards | 7–56 |
| 30:38 | Time of possession | 29:22 |

Individual stats

Raiders Passing
| | C/ATT^{1} | Yds | TD | INT | Sk | Yds | LG^{3} | Rate |
|---|---|---|---|---|---|---|---|---|
| Plunkett | 16/25 | 172 | 1 | 0 | 2 | 18 | 50 | 97.4 |

Raiders Rushing
| | Car^{2} | Yds | TD | LG^{3} |
|---|---|---|---|---|
| Marcus Allen | 20 | 191 | 2 | 74 |
| Greg Pruitt | 5 | 17 | 0 | 11 |
| Kenny King | 3 | 12 | 0 | 10 |
| Chester Willis | 1 | 7 | 0 | 7 |
| Frank Hawkins | 3 | 6 | 0 | 3 |
| Jim Plunkett | 1 | −2 | 0 | −2 |

Raiders Receiving
| | Rec^{4} | Yds | TD | LG^{3} |
|---|---|---|---|---|
| Cliff Branch | 6 | 94 | 1 | 50 |
| Todd Christensen | 4 | 32 | 0 | 14 |
| Frank Hawkins | 2 | 20 | 0 | 14 |
| Marcus Allen | 2 | 18 | 0 | 12 |
| Kenny King | 2 | 8 | 0 | 7 |
| Malcolm Barnwell | 0 | 0 | 0 | 0 |

Raiders Kickoff Returns
| | Ret | Yds | Y/Rt | TD | Lng |
|---|---|---|---|---|---|
| Pruitt | 1 | 17 | 17.0 | 0 | 17 |

Raiders Punt Returns
| | Ret | Yds | Y/Rt | TD | Lng |
|---|---|---|---|---|---|
| Pruitt | 1 | 8 | 8.0 | 0 | 8 |
| Watts | 1 | 0 | 0.0 | 0 | 0 |

Raiders Punting
| | Pnt | Yds | Y/P | Lng | Blck |
|---|---|---|---|---|---|
| Guy | 7 | 299 | 42.7 | | |

Raiders Kicking
| | FGM–FGA | XPM–XPA |
|---|---|---|
| Bahr | 5–5 | 1–1 |

Raiders Sacks
| | Sacks |
|---|---|
| Barnes | 1.0 |
| Davis | 1.0 |
| Martin | 1.0 |
| Millen | 1.0 |
| Pickel | 1.0 |
| Townsend | 1.0 |

Raiders Interceptions
| | Int | Yds | TD | LG | PD |
|---|---|---|---|---|---|
| Squirek | 1 | 5 | 1 | 5 | 0 |
| Haynes | 1 | 0 | 0 | 0 | 0 |

Starting Lineups

| Position | Starting Lineups vs. Washington (Super Bowl XVIII) |
|---|---|
Offense
| WR | Cliff Branch |
| LT | Bruce Davis |
| LG | Charley Hannah |
| C | Dave Dalby |
| RG | Steve Sylvester |
| RT | Henry Lawrence |
| TE | Todd Christensen |
| WR | Malcolm Barnwell |
| QB | Jim Plunkett |
| FB | Kenny King |
| RB | Marcus Allen |
Defense
| LDE | Howie Long |
| NT | Reggie Kinlaw |
| RDE | Lyle Alzado |
| LOLB | Ted Hendricks |
| LILB | Matt Millen |
| RILB | Bob Nelson |
| ROLB | Rod Martin |
| LCB | Lester Hayes |
| RCB | Mike Haynes |
| SS | Mike Davis |
| FS | Vann McElroy |

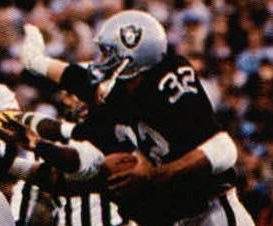
Marcus Allen rushes in Super Bowl XVIII.

Less than five minutes into the game, Derrick Jensen blocked Redskins Jeff Hayes punt and recovered the ball in the end zone to give the Raiders a 7–0 lead. On their ensuing drive, Washington was forced to punt, but Los Angeles punt returner Ted Watts muffed the kick and Washington safety Greg Williams recovered the ball at the Raiders 42-yard line. However, the Redskins could only advance to 27-yard line.

The Redskins regrouped in the second half, and scoring on their opening drive by marching 70 yards in 9 plays. First, Garrett returned the opening kickoff 35 yards from 5 yards deep in the end zone to the Washington 30-yard line. Then, Theismann completed a 23-yard pass to receiver Charlie Brown to the Raiders' 47-yard line. Eight plays later, fullback John Riggins finished the drive with a 1-yard touchdown run. (Riggins became the second player to run for touchdowns in back-to-back Super Bowls. He had one in Super Bowl XVII en route to winning that game's Super Bowl MVP). Moseley's extra point attempt was blocked by Don Hasselbeck, but the Redskins had cut the score to 21–9 and were just 2 touchdowns away from taking the lead.

However, the Raiders completely took over the rest of the game, preventing any chance of a Washington comeback. On the ensuing drive, Washington defensive back Darrell Green was called for a 38-yard pass interference penalty while trying to cover Raiders receiver Malcolm Barnwell, setting up running back Marcus Allen's 5-yard touchdown run 7 plays later to make the score 28–9.

On the next Raiders possession, the last play of the third quarter, Plunkett handed the ball off to Allen, who started to run left. But then he saw a lot of defenders in front of him so he cut back to the middle and took off for a then Super Bowl record 74-yard touchdown run, increasing Los Angeles' lead to 35–9.

In the final period, the Raiders sacked Theismann 3 times, forcing him to fumble once, and intercepted a pass. Meanwhile, a 39-yard run from Allen set up a 21-yard field goal from kicker Chris Bahr to make the final score of the game 38–9.

Raiders win and in 1984 finished 11–5. But in the Wild Card lost to the Seahawks 13–7.

== Media ==
Radio
| Flagship Station | Play-by-play | Color Commentator | Studio Host |
|---|---|---|---|
| KRLA–AM 1110 | Bill King | Rich Marotta | |
Pre Season TV
| Station | Play-by-play | Color Commentator | Studio Host |
| KNBC–TV 4 | | | |
