= Cleo Montgomery =

American football player (born 1956)

No. 24, 28, 21
- Position: Return specialist

Personal information
- Born: July 1, 1956 (age 70); Greenville, Mississippi, U.S.
- Listed height: 5 ft 8 in (1.73 m)
- Listed weight: 183 lb (83 kg)

Career information
- High school: Greenville (MS)
- College: Abilene Christian
- NFL draft: 1978: undrafted

Career history
- Washington Redskins (1978)*; Denver Broncos (1980)*; Cincinnati Bengals (1980); Cleveland Browns (1981); Los Angeles Raiders (1981–1985)
- * Offseason or practice squad member only

Awards and highlights
- Super Bowl champion (XVIII)

Career NFL statistics
- Games played: 62
- Receptions: 2
- Receiving yards: 29
- Receiving average: 14.5
- Receiving touchdowns: 0
- Return yards: 3,328
- Return touchdowns: 1
- Stats at Pro Football Reference

Cleotha Montgomery (born July 1, 1956) is an American former professional football player who was a wide receiver and return specialist. He played for six seasons in the National Football League (NFL) for the Los Angeles Raiders, Cleveland Browns, and Cincinnati Bengals.

He is the younger brother of Wilbert Montgomery, a running back who had a 9-year career in the NFL.

== Biography ==
Cleo Montgomery was born July 1, 1956, at Greenville, Mississippi, the largest city in the Mississippi Delta. He attended Greenville High School before attending Abilene Christian University in Abilene, Texas on a football scholarship, as had his older brother, Philadelphia Eagles running back Wilbert Montgomery.

He was not drafted into the National Football League (NFL) but managed to sign as a free agent with the Washington Redskins in May 1978. The younger Montgomery's path was not an easy one, as he was released by the Redskins on July 17, 1978. He would be unable to find interest in the league until May 1980, when he signed another free agent contract, this time with the Denver Broncos. Once again he would fall victim to training camp cuts, released by the team on August 26. This time he was able to find a new home, however, signing on September 19 with the Cincinnati Bengals.

Although nominally listed as a wide receiver, Montgomery was used by the Bengals almost exclusively as a return specialist during the 1980 season, seeing action in all 14 games of his rookie year, during which he brought back 31 punts and 44 kickoffs, averaging 7.2 and 19.2 yards per return, respectively.

Montgomery went into camp the next season with the Bengals, but they decided to move along from him, having him turn in his playbook on October 9, after having played in four games. The next stop would be the Oakland Raiders, who signed him on December 16 and played him in their last game before moving to Los Angeles the following year.

He would play 9 games for the Raiders in 1982 and all 14 games in 1983, returning kicks but not punts. He even saw limited action as a wide receiver in 1983, catching the only two balls of his NFL career — catches for 14 and 15 yards gained. The 1983 Raiders would go on to win an NFL Championship, beating the Washington Redskins 38–9 in Super Bowl XVIII.

The Raiders would put him to work returning both kickoffs and punts in 1984, and the 28-year old Montgomery was once again able to answer the bell every Sunday of the season — a year expanded for the first time to 16 games.

Montgomery was once again the team's primary returner of punts and kicks in 1985, but a serious knee injury suffered on September 29 against the New England Patriots ended his season and effectively his career.
