= Chester Willis =

American football player (born 1958)

No. 38
- Position: Running back

Personal information
- Born: May 2, 1958 (age 68); Elberton, Georgia, U.S.
- Listed height: 5 ft 11 in (1.80 m)
- Listed weight: 195 lb (88 kg)

Career information
- High school: Johnson (Gainesville, Georgia)
- College: Auburn
- NFL draft: 1981: 11th round, 304th overall pick

Career history
- Oakland/Los Angeles Raiders (1981–1984)

Awards and highlights
- Super Bowl champion (XVIII)

Career NFL statistics
- Rushing yards: 73
- Rushing average: 2.3
- Touchdowns: 1
- Stats at Pro Football Reference

Chester Willis (born May 2, 1958) is a former halfback for the Oakland/Los Angeles Raiders. He collegiately played for Auburn Tigers.

Willis was born on May 2, 1958 in Elberton, Georgia. He played running back at Johnson High School in Gainesville, Georgia. Willis was considered one of the top recruits in the state of Georgia and committed to play college football at Auburn over offers from schools such as Tennessee, Georgia Tech, and Pittsburgh.

Willis was a two-year letterwinner at Auburn. After starting on the freshman team as a wide receiver, he was moved to cornerback ahead of his sophomore season in 1978. Willis was switched to running back that October after an injury to James Brooks. In his offensive debut, he ran for 34 yards and a touchdown against Vanderbilt. Ahead of his junior year, Willis was moved once again to fullback, where his main function was blocking. "Myself, I'm a running back," he later said. "I couldn't adjust to all those changes that quickly." Willis sat behind players like Brooks, William Andrews, and Joe Cribbs, resulting in limited touches. He also competed as a sprinter on the Tigers' track and field team.

Willis was selected 304th overall by the Oakland Raiders in the 11th round of the 1981 NFL draft and made the final roster. He played primarily on special teams. In four seasons with the team, Willis ran for 73 yards and one touchdown on 32 carries. He was released during training camp cuts on August 13, 1985.
