= Ted Watts =

American football player (born 1958)

No. 41, 20, 21, 28
- Position: Cornerback

Personal information
- Born: May 29, 1958 (age 68); Tarpon Springs, Florida, U.S.
- Listed height: 6 ft 0 in (1.83 m)
- Listed weight: 195 lb (88 kg)

Career information
- High school: Tarpon Springs
- College: Texas Tech
- NFL draft: 1981: 1st round, 21st overall pick

Career history
- Oakland/Los Angeles Raiders (1981–1984); New York Giants (1985); San Diego Chargers (1987)

Awards and highlights
- Super Bowl champion (XVIII); First-team All-SWC (1980)

Career NFL statistics
- Interceptions: 5
- Fumble recoveries: 3
- Sacks: 1
- Stats at Pro Football Reference

Ted W. Watts (born May 29, 1958) is an American former professional football player who was a cornerback in the National Football League (NFL). He played college football for the Texas Tech Red Raiders.

== Professional career ==
He was the cornerback of the Oakland/Los Angeles Raiders, New York Giants, and the San Diego Chargers. Watts played six years in the NFL.
