= Calvin Muhammad =

American football player (1958–2023)

No. 82, 89, 81
- Position: Wide receiver

Personal information
- Born: December 10, 1958; Jacksonville, Florida, U.S.
- Died: January 4, 2023 (aged 64); Jacksonville, Florida, U.S.
- Listed height: 5 ft 11 in (1.80 m)
- Listed weight: 190 lb (86 kg)

Career information
- High school: William M. Raines (Jacksonville)
- College: Texas Southern
- NFL draft: 1980: 12th round, 322nd overall pick

Career history
- Los Angeles Raiders (1982–1983); Washington Redskins (1984–1985); Toronto Argonauts (1987); San Diego Chargers (1987)

Awards and highlights
- Super Bowl champion (XVIII)

Career NFL statistics
- Receptions: 69
- Receiving yards: 1,276
- Touchdowns: 8
- Stats at Pro Football Reference

Calvin Saleem Muhammad (born Calvin Vincent Raley; December 10, 1958 – January 4, 2023) was an American professional football wide receiver in the National Football League (NFL) for the Los Angeles Raiders, Washington Redskins, and San Diego Chargers. He played college football at Texas Southern University and was selected 322nd overall in the 12th round of the 1980 NFL draft. Muhammad converted to Islam while in college. Muhammad had three daughters; Dr. Khaleelah Jones, Bekkah Moss and Jean Jones, and two sons, Calvin ‘Ibin’ Muhammad II and Vincent Nyles Jenkins. He died on January 4, 2023, at the age of 64.
