= Tony Caldwell =

American football player (born 1961)

No. 57
- Position: Linebacker

Personal information
- Born: April 1, 1961 (age 65); Los Angeles, California, U.S.
- Listed height: 6 ft 1 in (1.85 m)
- Listed weight: 225 lb (102 kg)

Career information
- High school: Carson (Carson, California)
- College: Washington
- NFL draft: 1983: 3rd round, 82nd overall pick

Career history
- Los Angeles Raiders (1983–1985); Seattle Seahawks (1987)

Awards and highlights
- Super Bowl champion (XVIII)

Career NFL statistics
- Interceptions: 1
- Fumble recoveries: 1
- Stats at Pro Football Reference

Anthony L. Caldwell (born April 1, 1961) is an American former professional football player who was a linebacker in the National Football League (NFL). He attended the University of Washington. He played for the Los Angeles Raiders from 1983 to 1985, and the Seattle Seahawks in 1987.
