= Archie Reese =

American football player (born 1956)

No. 78, 74
- Positions: Defensive tackle, defensive end

Personal information
- Born: February 4, 1956 (age 70); Mayesville, South Carolina, U.S.
- Listed height: 6 ft 3 in (1.91 m)
- Listed weight: 267 lb (121 kg)

Career information
- College: Clemson
- NFL draft: 1978: 5th round, 127th overall pick

Career history
- San Francisco 49ers (1978–1981); Los Angeles Raiders (1982–1983)

Awards and highlights
- 2× Super Bowl champion (XVI, XVIII)

Career NFL statistics
- Sacks: 21
- Fumble recoveries: 7
- Touchdowns: 1
- Stats at Pro Football Reference

Archie Ronald Bernard Reese (born February 4, 1956) is an American former professional football player who was a defensive tackle in the National Football League (NFL). He played college football for the Clemson Tigers. Reese played in the NFL for the San Francisco 49ers from 1978 to 1981 and the Los Angeles Raiders from 1982 to 1983. He also played with the Pittsburgh Maulers of the United States Football League (USFL).
