= Malcolm Barnwell =

American football player (born 1958)

No. 80
- Position: Wide receiver

Personal information
- Born: June 28, 1958 (age 68); Charleston, South Carolina, U.S.
- Listed height: 5 ft 11 in (1.80 m)
- Listed weight: 184 lb (83 kg)

Career information
- College: Virginia Union
- NFL draft: 1980: 7th round, 173rd overall pick

Career history
- Oakland/Los Angeles Raiders (1981–1984); New Orleans Saints (1985); Washington Redskins (1985)

Awards and highlights
- 2× Super Bowl champion (XV, XVIII)

Career NFL statistics
- Receptions: 115
- Receiving yards: 1,969
- Receiving touchdowns: 4
- Stats at Pro Football Reference

Malcolm Barnwell (born June 28, 1958) is an American former professional football player who was a wide receiver for five seasons in the National Football League (NFL) for the Washington Redskins, the New Orleans Saints and the Oakland / Los Angeles Raiders. Barnwell was traded by the Raiders to the Redskins on August 26, 1985, in exchange for the Redskins' second-round pick in the 1986 NFL draft. His best season was 1984, when he totaled 45 receptions for 851 yards, an 18.9 avg. and two touchdowns, all career highs.

In 2019, Barnwell was interviewed for the Raiders official team website, where he talked about being scouted while playing for Virginia Union, a historically black college and being scouted by Raiders legend Willie Brown.

== Legal troubles ==
In June 1986, Barnwell, who had been traded by the Raiders to Washington Redskins after the 1984 season, was arrested and charged with cocaine possession. Barnwell had been a free agent at this point after being released by the New Orleans Saints in December 1985. A warrant on an unrelated matter had already been issued for Barnwell when he was found in a hotel room with $400 worth of cocaine.
