= 1982 San Diego Chargers season =

NFL team season

- Owner: Eugene V. Klein
- General manager: Johnny Sanders
- Head coach: Don Coryell
- Offensive coordinator: Larrye Weaver
- Defensive coordinator: Tom Bass
- Home stadium: Jack Murphy Stadium

Results
- Record: 6–3
- Division place: 5th AFC (Would have been 2nd in the AFC West)
- Playoffs: Won First Round Playoffs (at Steelers) 31–28; Lost Second Round Playoffs (at Dolphins) 13–34
- All-Pros: 7: WR Wes Chandler (1st team); QB Dan Fouts (1st team); FS Tim Fox (2nd team); DT Gary Johnson (2nd team); T Russ Washington (2nd team); G Doug Wilkerson (1st team); TE Kellen Winslow (1st team)
- Pro Bowlers: 7: K Rolf Benirschke; WR Wes Chandler; QB Dan Fouts; DT Gary Johnson; RB Chuck Muncie; G Doug Wilkerson; TE Kellen Winslow

Chargers' quarterback Dan Fouts (middle) calls signals during a week-6 matchup with the San Francisco 49ers. Fouts tied his own club record with 444 yards passing on the day.

The 1982 San Diego Chargers season was the team's 23rd year, and 13th in the National Football League. The team had a 10–6 record in 1981. 1982 was a strike-shortened season so the league was divided up into two conferences instead of its normal divisional alignment — the Chargers finished 6–3, qualifying for the playoffs as the #5 seed. Their run ended with a second round loss to the Dolphins. This would prove the team's last playoff appearance until 1992.

The 1982 Chargers were the top-scoring team in the NFL. They scored a total of 288 points — an average of 32 points per game. They led the league in passing touchdowns (19), rushing touchdowns (15, tied with the Raiders) passing yards (2,927), and yards per pass attempt (8.9).

The Chargers defense, however, surrendered the most passing yards (2,292), and second-most first downs (119) in the league.

Chargers quarterback Dan Fouts was named Pro Football Writers of America MVP, and 1982 AP Offensive Player of the Year. While the shortened season prevented him from breaking the passing yardage record for the fourth season in a row, his mark of 320.3 yards per game would not be surpassed until 2011. Wes Chandler missed one game through injury but still led the league with 1,032 receiving yards; his average of 129.0 yards per game remains a record, and his nine touchdown receptions led the league. In support, Kellen Winslow had the second-most receptions (54) and the third-most yards (721) in the NFL; veteran Charlie Joiner saw a small drop-off in production but still contributed 545 yards.

At running back, Chuck Muncie had another strong all-around year, rushing for 569 yards, catching passes for a further 207, and scoring nine touchdowns while throwing for two more. James Brooks added 430 rushing yards and, with his receiving and kick returns, gained a league-leading 1,383 all-purpose yards.

San Diego's defensive line was unchanged, and helped the team rank ninth against the run. Keith Ferguson led the team with 4.5 sacks, half a sack ahead of Gary "Big Hands" Johnson. Three new starters were brought into the defensive backfield in an attempt to strengthen the pass defense, but they were ranked dead last for the second consecutive season. The unit did rank seventh for turnovers with 25; newly signed free safety Tim Fox led the team with four interceptions. Rolf Benirschke made his lone Pro Bowl after converting 16 of 22 kicks, including all seven of his attempts in the 40–49-yard range.

== Offseason ==
=== NFL draft ===
1982 San Diego Chargers draft
Round	Pick	Player	Position	College	Notes
7	188	Hollis Hall	Defensive back	Clemson	
8	215	Maury Buford	Punter	Texas Tech	
9	246	Warren Lyles	Defensive tackle	Alabama	
10	273	Andre Young	Defensive back	Louisiana Tech	
11	299	Anthony Watson	Defensive back	New Mexico State	
Made roster * Made at least one Pro Bowl during career

== Personnel ==
=== Staff ===
1982 San Diego Chargers staff
Front office: Owner – Eugene V. Klein; Head coaches: Head coach – Don Coryell; Offensive coaches: Offensive coordinator – Larrye Weaver; Wide receivers – Ernie Zampese	Defensive coaches: Defensive coordinator – Tom Bass

=== Roster ===
1982 San Diego Chargers roster
Quarterbacks (QB): 14 Dan Fouts; 11 Ed Luther; Running backs (RB): 37 Hank Bauer; 21 James Brooks; 25 John Cappelletti; 40 Jim Jodat; 46 Chuck Muncie; Wide receivers (WR): 89 Wes Chandler; 82 Bobby Duckworth; 81 Scott Fitzkee; 18 Charlie Joiner; 87 Dwight Scales; Tight ends (TE): 88 Pete Holohan; 85 Eric Sievers; 80 Kellen Winslow	Offensive linemen (OL): 77 Sam Claphan T; 75 Andrew Gissinger T; 64 Chuck Loewen G/T; 62 Don Macek C; 60 Dennis McKnight G; 56 Bob Rush C; 66 Billy Shields T; 70 Russ Washington T; 67 Ed White G; 63 Doug Wilkerson G; Defensive linemen (DL): 91 Rick Ackerman DE; 76 Keith Ferguson DE; 79 Gary Johnson DT; 68 Leroy Jones DE; 74 Louie Kelcher DT; 90 John Woodcock DE; 99 Wilbur Young DT	Linebackers (LB): 50 Carlos Bradley OLB; 57 Linden King OLB; 53 Dave Lewis OLB; 51 Woodrow Lowe OLB; 52 Ray Preston OLB; 58 Dewey Selmon MLB; 59 Cliff Thrift MLB; Defensive backs (DB): 27 Jeff Allen CB; 28 Willie Buchanon CB; 48 Tim Fox FS; 43 Bob Gregor FS; 30 Bruce Laird SS; 24 Miles McPherson FS; 29 Mike Williams CB; 49 Andre Young SS; Special teams (ST): 6 Rolf Benirschke K; 8 Maury Buford P	Reserve: 42 Ricky Bell RB (NF-Ill.); 97 Don Brown T (IR); 93 Steve Doolittle LB (IR); 78 Warren Lyles DT (IR); 94 Derrie Nelson LB (IR); 61 Jimmy Webb DT (Ret.); Rookies in italics

== Preseason ==
Week	Date	Opponent	Result	Record	Venue	Attendance
1	August 16	Chicago Bears	W 28–27	1–0	Jack Murphy Stadium	
2	August 21	Dallas Cowboys	L 16–26	1–1	Jack Murphy Stadium	
3	August 28	San Francisco 49ers	W 23–9	2–1	Jack Murphy Stadium	
4	September 4	at Los Angeles Rams	L 14–20	2–2	Anaheim Stadium	

== Regular season ==
=== Schedule ===
Week	Original week	Date	Opponent	Result	Record	Venue	Attendance	Recap
1	1	September 12	at **Denver Broncos**	**W** 23–3	1–0	Mile High Stadium	73,564	Recap
2	2	September 19	at **Kansas City Chiefs**	**L** 12–19	1–1	Arrowhead Stadium	60,514	Recap
—	3	September 26	**Los Angeles Raiders**	postponed	1–1	Jack Murphy Stadium	1982 NFL player strike	
	4	October 3	at Atlanta Falcons	cancelled	1–1	Atlanta–Fulton County Stadium	1982 NFL player strike	
—	5	October 10	Seattle Seahawks	cancelled	1–1	Jack Murphy Stadium	1982 NFL player strike	
—	6	October 17	Kansas City Chiefs	cancelled	1–1	Jack Murphy Stadium	1982 NFL player strike	
—	7	October 24	at Seattle Seahawks	cancelled	1–1	Kingdome	1982 NFL player strike	
—	8	October 31	Los Angeles Rams	cancelled	1–1	Jack Murphy Stadium	1982 NFL player strike	
—	9	November 8	at Miami Dolphins	cancelled	1–1	Miami Orange Bowl	1982 NFL player strike	
—	10	November 14	New Orleans Saints	cancelled	1–1	Jack Murphy Stadium	1982 NFL player strike	
3	11	November 22	at **Los Angeles Raiders**	**L** 24–28	1–2	Los Angeles Memorial Coliseum	42,162	Recap
4	12	November 28	**Denver Broncos**	**W** 30–20	2–2	Jack Murphy Stadium	47,629	Recap
5	13	December 5	at Cleveland Browns	**W** 30–13	3–2	Cleveland Municipal Stadium	54,064	Recap
6	14	December 11	at San Francisco 49ers	**W** 41–37	4–2	Candlestick Park	55,988	Recap
7	15	December 20	Cincinnati Bengals	**W** 50–34	5–2	Jack Murphy Stadium	51,296	Recap
8	16	December 26	Baltimore Colts	**W** 44–26	6–2	Jack Murphy Stadium	49,711	Recap
9	17	January 2, 1983	**Los Angeles Raiders**	**L** 34–41	6–3	Jack Murphy Stadium	51,612	Recap
Note: Intra-division opponents are in **bold** text.

=== Game summaries ===
==== Week 1: at Denver Broncos ====
Week One: San Diego Chargers at Denver Broncos – Game summary

Quarter	1	2	3	4	Total
Chargers	3	3	10	7	**23**
Broncos	0	3	0	0	**3**

at Mile High Stadium, Denver, Colorado

- Date: September 12
- Game time: 2:00 p.m. MDT
- Game weather: 48 °F (8.9 °C), relative humidity 82%, wind 10 miles per hour (16 km/h; 8.7 kn)
- Game attendance: 73,564
- Referee: Jim Tunney
- TV announcers (NBC): Marv Albert and Jim Turner
- Box score

Game information

**First quarter**

- SDG – Rolf Benirschke 50-yard field goal, 8:10. Chargers 3–0. **Drive: 5 plays, 19 yards, 2:44.**

**Second quarter**

- DEN – Rich Karlis 40-yard field goal, 11:11. Tied 3–3. **Drive: 11 plays, 44 yards, 5:12.**
- SDG – Rolf Benirschke 24-yard field goal, 6:25. Chargers 6–3. **Drive: 13 plays, 71 yards, 4:35.**

**Third quarter**

- SDG – Rolf Benirschke 40-yard field goal, 9:52. Chargers 9–3. **Drive: 7 plays, 49 yards, 3:26.**
- SDG – Scott Fitzkee 18-yard pass from Dan Fouts (Rolf Benirschke kick), 1:00. Chargers 16–3. **Drive: 13 plays, 88 yards, 6:59.**

**Fourth quarter**

- SDG – Chuck Muncie 10-yard run (Rolf Benirschke kick), 1:39. Chargers 23–3. **Drive: 10 plays, 80 yards, 3:49.**

**Top passers**

- SDG – Dan Fouts – 19/33, 253 yards, TD
- DEN – Craig Morton – 15/20, 153 yards, 2 INT

**Top rushers**

- SDG – Chuck Muncie – 18 rushes, 79 yards, TD
- DEN – Sammy Winder – 6 rushes, 38 yards

**Top receivers**

- SDG – Wes Chandler – 4 receptions, 120 yards
- DEN – Rick Upchurch – 6 receptions, 97 yards

Benirschke opened the scoring with a 50-yard kick, though he later missed from the same distance. Denver tied the score in the 2nd quarter before San Diego responded with a 71-yard drive that stalled at the Denver 7-yard line; Benirschke restored the lead from 24 yards out. The Broncos moved to a 3rd and 15 at the San Diego 27. From there Craig Morton found Rick Upchurch for a 14-yard catch, Dewey Selmon forced a fumble that Ray Preston recovered. The Chargers drove into Denver territory in the final seconds of the half, but Benirschke missed a 58-yard field goal try and it remained 6–3 at the break.

Bob Gregor intercepted Morton early in the second half, and Fouts found Chandler for 40 yards on a 3rd and 16, leading to Benirschke's third field goal. Andre Young added another interception on the next Denver drive—he fumbled afterwards, but Selmon recovered at his own 12-yard line. San Diego drove 88 yards from there: Chandler twice converted third downs by running the ball, and Fouts found Scott Fitzkee in the end zone for the touchdown. Denver blocked a Maury Buford punt in the final quarter, taking over at the San Diego 21-yard line and reaching 2nd and goal at the 3; a fumbled handoff then bounced into the end zone for Preston to make his second fumble recovery of the day. Chandler's 39-yard reception on a 3rd and 10 then set up Muncie's insurance touchdown.

San Diego forced all six of the game's turnovers, with four fumble recoveries and two interceptions. Young had two fumble recoveries and an interception, plus seven tackles. Fitzkee's touchdown reception was one of three catches he had in his two seasons with the Chargers.

==== Week 2: at Kansas City Chiefs ====
Week Two: San Diego Chargers at Kansas City Chiefs – Game summary

Quarter	1	2	3	4	Total
Chargers	0	0	9	3	**12**
Chiefs	7	9	3	0	**19**

at Arrowhead Stadium, Kansas City, Missouri

- Date: September 19
- Game time: 12:00 p.m. CDT
- Game weather: 61 °F (16.1 °C), relative humidity 72%, wind 10 miles per hour (16 km/h; 8.7 kn)
- Game attendance: 60,514
- Referee: Ben Dreith
- TV announcers (NBC): Marv Albert and Bob Griese
- Box score

Game information

**First quarter**

- KAN – Dave Klug blocked punt recovery in end zone (Nick Lowery kick), 13:09. Chiefs 7–0.

**Second quarter**

- KAN – Nick Lowery 19-yard field goal, 11:50. Chiefs 10–0. **Drive: 16 plays, 67 yards, 9:16.**
- KAN – Nick Lowery 27-yard field goal, 2:36. Chiefs 13–0. **Drive: 6 plays, 48 yards, 2:27.**
- KAN – Nick Lowery 41-yard field goal, 0:00. Chiefs 16–0. **Drive: 7 plays, 18 yards, 1:02.**

**Third quarter**

- SDG – Wes Chandler 17-yard pass from Chuck Muncie (Rolf Benirschke kick), 8:02. Chiefs 16–7. **Drive: 8 plays, 77 yards, 3:40.**
- SDG – Safety, Matt Herkenhoff illegal chop block in end zone, 6:20. Chiefs 16–9.
- KAN – Nick Lowery 34-yard field goal, 2:23. Chiefs 19–9. **Drive: 8 plays, 31 yards, 2:47.**

**Fourth quarter**

- SDG – Rolf Benirschke 49-yard field goal, 14:21. Chiefs 19–12. **Drive: 8 plays, 18 yards, 2:50.**

**Top passers**

- SDG – Dan Fouts – 21/36, 204 yards, INT
- KAN – Bill Kenney – 22/30, 203 yards, INT

**Top rushers**

- SDG – Chuck Muncie – 12 rushes, 52 yards
- KAN – Joe Delaney – 10 rushes, 51 yards

**Top receivers**

- SDG – Wes Chandler – 6 receptions, 69 yards, TD
- KAN – Henry Marshall – 4 receptions, 63 yards

San Diego were forced to punt on their first possession, and Buford's kick was blocked and recovered in the end zone to put the Chiefs ahead to stay. Andre Young stopped the next Chiefs drive with an interception; on the one after that, Gregor and Dave Lewis combined to tackle a receiver one yard short of the goal line on a 3rd and goal play, leading to a short field goal. Dwight Scales' 27-yard catch on 3rd and 14 prolonged the Chargers' answering drive, which appeared to have ended with Benirschke's 45-yard kick; a holding penalty called on Linden King forced San Diego to punt instead. Fumbles by Brooks (on a punt return) and Fouts (on a 2nd and 5 from the Kansas City 38-yard line) set up further Chiefs field goals and the score was 16–0 at the break.

The Chargers' defense forced a punt to open the second half, and their offense drove 77 yards for a touchdown: Winslow caught 3 passes for 47 yards, and Muncie threw a touchdown to Chandler on a halfback option play. Wilbur Young sacked Chiefs quarterback Bill Kenney on the next drive—backed up near to their own goal line, the Chiefs committed a penalty in their own end zone two plays later, conceding a safety. Three plays later, Fouts was intercepted and Kansas City added a fourth field goal. Brooks ran the ensuing kickoff back 47 yards to midfield, and Chandler's 26-yard catch moved the Chargers to the Kansas City 12-yard line. Fouts was sacked on third down, and Benirschke made a 49-yard field goal. San Diego had one more possession, which started at their own 20-yard line. Chandler's 26-yard catch converted a 3rd and 20 before they reached a 4th and 5 at the Kansas City 40. From there, Joiner made a catch that would have produced a first down, but Russ Washington was flagged for holding; that pushed the Chargers back 10 yards and they punted instead. Kansas City gained three first downs and ran the final four minutes off the clock.

Both teams gained 282 yards on offense. Fouts threw for 204 yards, his smallest total in a regular season game since week 14, 1980.

==== Week 3: at Los Angeles Raiders ====
Week Three: San Diego Chargers at Los Angeles Raiders – Game summary

Quarter	1	2	3	4	Total
Chargers	10	14	0	0	**24**
Raiders	0	7	14	7	**28**

at Los Angeles Memorial Coliseum, Los Angeles, California

- Date: November 22
- Game time: 6:00 p.m. PST
- Game weather: 57 °F (13.9 °C), relative humidity 70%, wind 7 miles per hour (11 km/h; 6.1 kn)
- Game attendance: 42,162
- Referee: Bob McElwee
- TV announcers (ABC): Frank Gifford, Don Meredith and Howard Cosell
- Box score

Game information

**First quarter**

- SDG – Rolf Benirschke 19-yard field goal, 8:25. Chargers 3–0. **Drive: 13 plays, 79 yards, 6:35.**
- SDG – Dwight Scales 29-yard pass from Dan Fouts (Rolf Benirschke kick), 4:00. Chargers 10–0. **Drive: 4 plays, 83 yards, 1:52.**

**Second quarter**

- SDG – Chuck Muncie 2-yard run (Rolf Benirschke kick), 11:32. Chargers 17–0. **Drive: 5 plays, 48 yards, 2:58.**
- SDG – Chuck Muncie 1-yard run (Rolf Benirschke kick), 6:58. Chargers 24–0. **Drive: 6 plays, 57 yards.**
- RAI – Todd Christensen 1-yard pass from Jim Plunkett (Chris Bahr kick), 0:36. Chargers 24–7. **Drive: 5 plays, 17 yards, 0:43.**

**Third quarter**

- RAI – Marcus Allen 3-yard run (Chris Bahr kick), 6:25. Chargers 24–14. **Drive: 7 plays, 63 yards.**
- RAI – Marcus Allen 6-yard run (Chris Bahr kick), 2:23. Chargers 24–21. **Drive: 4 plays, 30 yards.**

**Fourth quarter**

- RAI – Frank Hawkins 1-yard run (Chris Bahr kick), 5:54. Raiders 28–24. **Drive: 9 plays, 80 yards, 4:01.**

**Top passers**

- SDG – Dan Fouts – 25/42, 357 yards, TD, 2 INT
- RAI – Jim Plunkett – 18/25, 163 yards, TD, 2 INT

**Top rushers**

- SDG – James Brooks – 8 rushes, 49 yards
- RAI – Marcus Allen – 18 rushes, 87 yards, 2 TD

**Top receivers**

- SDG – Wes Chandler – 7 receptions, 118 yards
- RAI – Todd Christensen – 8 receptions, 83 yards, TD

San Diego took the opening kickoff in their first game back after the players' strike and drove from their own 26 to a 1st and goal from the 1-yard line. From there, Muncie was stopped on three straight carries and Benirschke made a short field goal. Los Angeles went three-and-out, and Fouts led the Chargers 83 yards in four plays, completing passes of 12, 22 and 29 yards, the last of these a touchdown to Dwight Scales. Jim Plunkett was intercepted by Tim Fox three plays later. The teams exchanged punts, then receptions of 24 yards by Chandler and 19 yards by Winslow set up Muncie's first touchdown run. Los Angeles reached the Chargers 29-yard line, but Leroy Jones sacked Jim Plunkett for a loss of 10 yards and Cliff Thrift intercepted him on the next play. Soon afterwards, a 42-yard pass interference penalty moved the ball to the Los Angeles 2-yard line; Muncie scored again two plays later. The Raiders missed a field goal on the next drive, but Muncie fumbled on the next play. Los Angeles took over at the San Diego 17, Plunkett threw a 1-yard touchdown pass on 4th and goal, pulling the deficit back to 24–7 at halftime.

Los Angeles continued to draw closer in the 3rd quarter, with two Marcus Allen touchdowns either side of a Winslow fumble. Winslow had back-to-back receptions of 15 and 27 yards early in the final quarter, positioning Benirschke for a 22-yard field goal that he missed wide left. The Raiders took over at their own 20-yard line and drove for the winning touchdown with six minutes to play. Fouts responded by leading San Diego from their own 20 to the Raiders 18, with Chandler converting a 3rd and 15 with a 24-yard catch. The drive ended when Fouts threw a pass under heavy pressure that was intercepted in the end zone. After Allen ran for a first down, three further rushes left the Raiders facing a 4th down with 10 seconds on the clock. Ray Guy was then tackled at the Los Angeles 29-yard line with 4 seconds still to play. Fouts threw a Hail Mary pass into the back of the end zone, which the Raiders batted down as the game ended.

The Chargers had two 100-yard receivers, as Chandler caught 7 passes for 118 yards while Winslow caught 8 for 105 yards. Fouts had 235 of his 357 passing yards in the first half.

==== Week 4: vs. Denver Broncos ====
Week Four: Denver Broncos at San Diego Chargers – Game summary

Quarter	1	2	3	4	Total
Broncos	3	7	7	3	**20**
Chargers	0	17	3	10	**30**

at Jack Murphy Stadium, San Diego, California

- Date: November 28
- Game time: 6:00 p.m. PST
- Game weather: 61 °F (16.1 °C), relative humidity 60%, wind 6 miles per hour (9.7 km/h; 5.2 kn)
- Game attendance: 47,629
- Referee: Jerry Markbreit
- TV announcers (NBC): Don Criqui and John Brodie
- Box score

Game information

**First quarter**

- DEN – Rich Karlis 27-yard field goal, 5:33. Broncos 3–0. **Drive: 11 plays, 65 yards, 5:29.**

**Second quarter**

- SDG – Kellen Winslow 3-yard pass from Dan Fouts (Rolf Benirschke kick), 12:58. Chargers 7–3. **Drive: 13 plays, 86 yards, 7:26.**
- SDG – Rolf Benirschke 41-yard field goal, 11:14. Chargers 10–3. **Drive: 4 plays, 2 yards, 0:52.**
- SDG – Kellen Winslow 28-yard pass from Dan Fouts (Rolf Benirschke kick), 4:56. Chargers 17–3. **Drive: 9 plays, 44 yards, 3:23.**
- DEN – Rick Upchurch 15-yard pass from Steve DeBerg (Rich Karlis kick), 1:22. Chargers 17–10. **Drive: 8 plays, 67 yards, 5:12.**

**Third quarter**

- DEN – Steve DeBerg 6-yard run (Rich Karlis kick), 9:26. Tied 17–17. **Drive: 9 plays, 61 yards, 5:34.**
- SDG – Rolf Benirschke 18-yard field goal, 0:28. Chargers 20–17. **Drive: 4 plays, 4 yards, 1:45.**

**Fourth quarter**

- DEN – Rich Karlis 38-yard field goal, 12:20. Tied 20–20. **Drive: 6 plays, 33 yards, 2:56.**
- SDG – Kellen Winslow 2-yard pass from Dan Fouts (Rolf Benirschke kick), 6:16. Chargers 27–20. **Drive: 12 plays, 87 yards, 5:53.**
- SDG – Rolf Benirschke 42-yard field goal, 0:52. Chargers 30–20. **Drive: 8 plays, 39 yards, 2:39.**

**Top passers**

- DEN – Steve DeBerg – 19/28, 184 yards, TD, 2 INT
- SDG – Dan Fouts – 27/40, 337 yards, 3 TD, INT

**Top rushers**

- DEN – Dave Preston – 7 rushes, 40 yards
- SDG – James Brooks – 19 rushes, 56 yards

**Top receivers**

- DEN – Rick Parros – 9 receptions, 59 yards
- SDG – Charlie Joiner – 7 receptions, 121 yards

Fouts converted 3rd downs on the opening drive, but Brooks fumbled the ball into the end zone and Denver recovered; the Broncos drove 65 yards the other way for a field goal. San Diego came straight back with a 13-play, 86-yard drive, ending with Winslow bobbling the ball multiple times before possessing it for just long enough to claim a disputed 3-yard touchdown. Jones recovered a fumble two plays later, setting up a Benirschke field goal. On the next Chargers drive Joiner had a 10-yard catch on a 3rd and 8 before Winslow's second touchdown came on a 3rd and 3 from the Denver 28-yard line; Broncos defenders said that Joiner had illegally interfered with their coverage before the catch. The Broncos halved the deficit with a touchdown on the following drive, 1:22 before halftime. San Diego moved from their own 10 to the Broncos 36 before time expired in the half with them 17–10 up.

Denver began the second half with their second consecutive touchdown drive, tying the score. Muncie's 34-yard reception to the 11-yard line was nullified by a penalty on Ed White on the following drive, and the Chargers were forced to punt. Five consecutive possessions then resulted in turnovers: Thrift intercepted DeBerg, Fouts was intercepted, Bruce Laird recovered a fumble, John Cappelletti lost a fumble, then Rick Ackerman sacked DeBerg and forced a fumble that Keith Ferguson recovered at the Denver 5-yard line. Muncie was stopped on 3rd and goal from the 1, and the Chargers settled for a chip shot field goal. Denver again levelled the scores with a field goal early in the 4th quarter. Fouts then led his team 87 yards to another touchdown, with completions of 28 yards to Joiner and 22 to Cappelletti accounting for much of the yardage. Winslow scored on 3rd and goal from the 2-yard line after getting away with a push on a defender. Fox intercepted DeBerg on the next drive—he fumbled on the return but King recovered at the Denver 37. After Brooks ran for 2 yards on a 4th and 1, Benirschke hit the clinching field goal from 42 yards out with 55 seconds to play.

San Diego again had two 100-yard receivers: Winslow had 8 catches for 107 yards and 3 touchdowns, while Joiner had 7 for 121 yards. The Chargers gained 436 yards and forced five turnovers, enabling them to overcome 10 penalties for 100 yards.

==== Week 5: at Cleveland Browns ====
Week Five: San Diego Chargers at Cleveland Browns – Game summary

Quarter	1	2	3	4	Total
Chargers	14	13	0	3	**30**
Browns	3	0	10	0	**13**

at Municipal Stadium, Cleveland, Ohio

- Date: December 5
- Game time: 1:00 p.m. EST
- Game weather: 60 °F (15.6 °C), relative humidity 71%, wind 17 miles per hour (27 km/h; 15 kn)
- Game attendance: 54,064
- Referee: Pat Haggerty
- TV announcers (NBC): Don Criqui, Len Dawson
- Box score

Game information

**First quarter**

- SDG – Chuck Muncie 1-yard run (Rolf Benirschke kick), 10:01. Chargers 7–0. **Drive: 3 plays, 28 yards, 0:54.**
- SDG – Chuck Muncie 1-yard run (Rolf Benirschke kick), 3:43. Chargers 14–0. **Drive: 9 plays, 54 yards, 4:29.**
- CLE – Matt Bahr 46-yard field goal, 0:45. Chargers 14–3. **Drive: 6 plays, 33 yards, 2:50.**

**Second quarter**

- SDG – James Brooks 1-yard run (Rolf Benirschke kick), 2:31. Chargers 21–3. **Drive: 11 plays, 80 yards, 5:07.**
- SDG – James Brooks 11-yard run (kick failed), 1:32. Chargers 27–3. **Drive: 4 plays, 52 yards, 0:25.**

**Third quarter**

- CLE – Matt Bahr 34-yard field goal, 7:39. Chargers 27–6. **Drive: 15 plays, 71 yards, 7:21.**
- CLE – Ozzie Newsome 4-yard pass from Brian Sipe (Matt Bahr kick), 0:23. Chargers 27–13. **Drive: 11 plays, 65 yards, 5:30.**

**Fourth quarter**

- SDG – Rolf Benirschke 24-yard field goal, 4:43. Chargers 30–13. **Drive: 12 plays, 67 yards, 4:53.**

**Top passers**

- SDG – Dan Fouts – 18/23, 252 yards, 2 INT
- CLE – Brian Sipe – 33/48, 338 yards, TD, 2 INT

**Top rushers**

- SDG – James Brooks – 22 rushes, 96 yards, 2 TD
- CLE – Mike Pruitt – 18 rushes, 77 yards

**Top receivers**

- SDG – Charlie Joiner – 7 receptions, 92 yards
- CLE – Ozzie Newsome – 10 receptions, 140 yards, TD

Mike Williams intercepted Brian Sipe four minutes into the game, setting his offense up at the Cleveland 28-yard line. Muncie put the Chargers ahead to stay three plays later. The Browns went three-and-out, and Brooks returned the punt 24 yards to his own 46. San Diego drove for another touchdown from there; Chandler converted a 3rd and 7 with a 19-yard catch and Muncie scored on 3rd and goal from the 1. Cleveland responded with a Matt Bahr field goal, then stopped a Chargers drive by intercepting Fouts. The Browns had an opportunity to get closer, but Bahr missed a 35-yard kick. San Diego took over at their own 20-yard line and drove for another touchdown, with Muncie having a 39-yard catch and Joiner a 6-yard catch on 3rd and 4; they again scored on 3rd and goal from the 1, this time via a Brooks run. Fox intercepted Sipe on the ensuing drive, and the Chargers went 52 yards in 4 plays: Chandler had a 22-yard catch and Brooks scored the fourth Chargers touchdown in the space of five drives. Cleveland missed another field goal late in the half, leaving San Diego 27–3 ahead.

The Browns ran 26 of the first 30 plays of the second half, scoring a field goal and a touchdown either side of another Fouts interception. A Ferguson sack was instrumental in forcing Cleveland to punt on their next drive. Chandler's 21-yard catch moved San Diego into field goal range, and Benirschke made the game safe from 24 yards out. The Browns were stopped on downs at the San Diego 6-yard line in the final minutes.

Keith Ferguson had six solo tackles and two assists, and also contributed two of the Chargers' four sacks. Brooks gained 198 all-purpose yards: 22 rushes for 96 yards and 2 touchdowns, 1 catch for 9 yards, 3 kickoff returns for 69 yards, and 1 punt return for 24 yards.

==== Week 6: at San Francisco 49ers ====
Week Six: San Diego Chargers at San Francisco 49ers – Game summary

Quarter	1	2	3	4	Total
Chargers	7	17	7	10	**41**
49ers	7	10	7	13	**37**

at Candlestick Park, San Francisco, California

- Date: December 11
- Game time: 1:00 p.m. PST
- Game weather: 47 °F (8.3 °C), relative humidity 76%, wind 5 miles per hour (8.0 km/h; 4.3 kn)
- Game attendance: 55,988
- Referee: Red Cashion
- TV announcers (NBC): Dick Enberg and Merlin Olsen
- Box score

Game information

**First quarter**

- SDG – Wes Chandler 31-yard pass from Dan Fouts (Rolf Benirschke kick), 7:23. Chargers 7–0. **Drive: 7 plays, 80 yards, 2:38.**
- SF – Joe Montana 11-yard run (Ray Wersching kick), 2:15. Tied 7–7. **Drive: 8 plays, 74 yards, 5:08.**

**Second quarter**

- SDG – Rolf Benirschke 25-yard field goal, 12:39. Chargers 10–7. **Drive: 11 plays, 69 yards, 4:36.**
- SF – Jeff Moore 6-yard pass from Joe Montana (Ray Wersching kick), 10:14. 49ers 14–10. **Drive: 4 plays, 67 yards, 2:25.**
- SDG – Eric Sievers 25-yard pass from Dan Fouts (Rolf Benirschke kick), 7:50. Chargers 17–14. **Drive: 5 plays, 60 yards, 2:24.**
- SF – Ray Wersching 45-yard field goal, 2:07. Tied 17–17. **Drive: 10 plays, 44 yards, 5:43.**
- SDG – Wes Chandler 14-yard pass from Dan Fouts (Rolf Benirschke kick), 0:20. Chargers 24–17. **Drive: 11 plays, 85 yards, 1:47.**

**Third quarter**

- SDG – Wes Chandler 20-yard pass from Dan Fouts (Rolf Benirschke kick), 10:31. Chargers 31–17. **Drive: 10 plays, 59 yards, 3:24.**
- SF – Freddie Solomon 14-yard pass from Joe Montana (Ray Wersching kick), 5:55. Chargers 31–24. **Drive: 10 plays, 66 yards, 4:36.**

**Fourth quarter**

- SF – Bill Ring 9-yard run (kick failed), 14:19. Chargers 31–30. **Drive: 9 plays, 68 yards, 3:07.**
- SDG – Rolf Benirschke 41-yard field goal, 12:03. Chargers 34–30. **Drive: 6 plays, 38 yards, 2:16.**
- SF – Dwight Clark 7-yard pass from Joe Montana (Ray Wersching kick), 6:41. 49ers 37–34. **Drive: 11 plays, 71 yards, 5:22.**
- SDG – Chuck Muncie 3-yard pass from Dan Fouts (Rolf Benirschke kick), 3:22. Chargers 41–37. **Drive: 7 plays, 72 yards, 3:19.**

**Top passers**

- SDG – Dan Fouts – 33/48, 444 yards, 5 TD
- SF – Joe Montana – 31/46, 356 yards, 3 TD, 2 INT

**Top rushers**

- SDG – Chuck Muncie – 11 rushes, 35 yards
- SF – Bill Ring – 8 rushes, 44 yards, TD

**Top receivers**

- SDG – Charlie Joiner – 8 receptions, 145 yards
- SF – Dwight Clark – 12 receptions, 135 yards, TD

Facing the defending Super Bowl champions, San Diego opened the scoring via Chandler's 31-yard touchdown catch on 3rd and 8. San Francisco quarterback Joe Montana responded by leading 74-yard drive and running the ball in himself. Chandler appeared to have scored again on the next possession, but the score was ruled out by a holding penalty and the Chargers settled for a field goal. Montana completed all three of his passes while leading a go-ahead touchdown drive. Brooks returned the ensuing kickoff 35 yards to the San Diego 40; after missing on one pass, Fouts then strung together four completions in a row, three to Winslow for a total of 35 yards and the final one a 25-yard touchdown to Eric Sievers. San Francisco responded with a game-tying field goal with 2:07 on the clock. Fouts led the Chargers 85 yards in 11 plays, finding Chandler for a 25-yard completion and a 14-yard touchdown with 20 seconds on the clock. San Diego led 24–17 at halftime.

Three plays into the second half, Montana was intercepted by Jeff Allen. The Chargers when Chandler made a juggling catch for his third touchdown of the game. Montana responded on the next drive, converting a 4th and 3 before throwing his second touchdown. Benirschke had a chance to extend the lead, but his 50-yard field goal attempt missed to the right and Montana led another touchdown drive. However, Ray Wersching missed the extra point attempt, leaving San Diego up 31–30. Fouts began the next drive with back-to-back completions to Joiner of 16 and 27 yards, and Benirschke kicked a 41-yard field goal to increase the lead. San Francisco responded with their third consecutive touchdown drive, Dwight Clark catching Montana's touchdown pass on 3rd and goal from the 7-yard line. San Diego responded with Joiner's 43-yard catch setting up Muncie's 3-yard touchdown catch with 3:22 on the clock. San Francisco converted a 4th and 1 on the next drive, but soon found themselves facing a 4th and 10 on their own 31-yard line. Woodrow Lowe intercepted Montana, Cappelletti ran for 17 yards on the next play, and the Chargers ran the clock out.

Fouts had the joint-most passing yards in his career with 444. There were 65 completions in total, a new NFL record. San Diego had three 100-yard receivers: Joiner, 8 for 145; Chandler, 7 for 125, 3 touchdowns; Winslow, 9 for 101. The teams combined for 1003 offensive yards, with San Diego gaining 538.

==== Week 7: vs. Cincinnati Bengals ====
Week Seven: Cincinnati Bengals at San Diego Chargers – Game summary

Quarter	1	2	3	4	Total
Bengals	10	14	10	0	**34**
Chargers	7	10	23	10	**50**

at Jack Murphy Stadium, San Diego, California

- Date: December 20
- Game time: 6:00 p.m. PST
- Game weather: 56 °F (13.3 °C), relative humidity 79%, wind 6 miles per hour (9.7 km/h; 5.2 kn)
- Game attendance: 51,296
- Referee: Gene Barth
- TV announcers (ABC): Frank Gifford, Don Meredith and Howard Cosell
- Box score

Game information

**First quarter**

- CIN – Jim Breech 19-yard field goal, 11:19. Bengals 3–0. **Drive: 10 plays, 73 yards, 3:41.**
- SDG – Wes Chandler 66-yard pass from Chuck Muncie (Rolf Benirschke kick), 9:52. Chargers 7–3. **Drive: 3 plays, 78 yards, 1:17.**
- CIN – Ken Anderson 12-yard run, 3:22. Bengals 10–7. **Drive: 13 plays, 80 yards, 5:54.**

**Second quarter**

- CIN – Bo Harris 62-yard interception return (Jim Breech kick), 8:01. Bengals 17–7.
- SDG – James Brooks 17-yard run (Rolf Benirschke kick), 3:38. Bengals 17–14. **Drive: 9 plays, 77 yards, 4:14.**
- CIN – Cris Collinsworth 6-yard pass from Ken Anderson (Jim Breech kick), 0:28. Bengals 24–14. **Drive: 10 plays, 80 yards, 3:03.**
- SDG – Rolf Benirschke 43-yard field goal, 0:00. Bengals 24–17. **Drive: 4 plays, 56 yards, 0:26.**

**Third quarter**

- SDG – Chuck Muncie 1-yard run (Rolf Benirschke kick), 11:57. Tied 24–24. **Drive: 8 plays, 82 yards, 3:03.**
- SDG – Safety, Gary Johnson tackled Ken Anderson in end zone, 11:35. Chargers 26–24.
- SDG – Wes Chandler 38-yard pass from Dan Fouts (Rolf Benirschke kick), 10:06. Chargers 33–24. **Drive: 3 plays, 53 yards, 1:17.**
- CIN – Jim Breech 27-yard field goal, 7:53. Chargers 33–27. **Drive: 7 plays, 77 yards, 2:04.**
- SDG – James Brooks 48-yard run (Rolf Benirschke kick), 5:24. Chargers 40–27. **Drive: 6 plays, 71 yards, 2:21.**
- CIN – M. L. Harris 17-yard pass from Ken Anderson (Jim Breech kick), 1:14. Chargers 40–34. **Drive: 4 plays, 28 yards, 0:55.**

**Fourth quarter**

- SDG – Rolf Benirschke 26-yard field goal, 11:28. Chargers 43–34. **Drive: 10 plays, 72 yards, 4:41.**
- SDG – James Brooks 1-yard run (Rolf Benirschke kick), 3:43. Chargers 50–34. **Drive: 8 plays, 47 yards, 3:45.**

**Top passers**

- CIN – Ken Anderson – 40/56, 416 yards, 2 TD, INT
- SDG – Dan Fouts – 25/40, 435 yards, TD, 2 INT

**Top rushers**

- CIN – Pete Johnson – 7 rushes, 21 yards
- SDG – James Brooks – 12 rushes, 105 yards, 3 TD

**Top receivers**

- CIN – Cris Collinsworth – 9 receptions, 156 yards, TD
- SDG – Wes Chandler – 10 receptions, 260 yards, 2 TD

In a rematch of the previous season's AFC championship game, Cincinnati took the opening kickoff and drove to the San Diego 1-yard line before settling for a field goal. Three plays into the Chargers' response, Muncie executed a halfback 66-yard touchdown pass to Chandler, who was wide open inside the 30. Ken Anderson restored the Bengals' lead with a touchdown run on the following drive. In the 2nd quarter, Fouts was intercepted in the end zone and Cincinnati then drove to a 4th and 2 on the Chargers 33-yard line; they went for the first down, but Laird and King combined to stop Pete Johnson a yard short. Three plays later, a Fouts pass was intercepted and returned 62 yards for a touchdown. The Chargers responded with Brooks' 17-yard touchdown run, then Anderson restored the Bengals 10-point lead with 29 seconds to play in the half. Fouts completed 3 of 4 passes for 56 yards to reach the Bengals 24-yard line with a second to play—Benirschke's kick made it 24–17 at halftime.

San Diego tied the score on the first possession of the second half: Joiner had a 17-yard catch on 3rd and 15, Winslow followed up with a 40-yard reception, and Muncie scored from a yard out. On the next play from scrimmage, Gary Johnson sacked Anderson in the end zone for a go-ahead safety. Three plays after that, Chandler took a short pass slant in for a 38-yard touchdown; the Chargers had scored 16 points in less than two minutes. Cincinnati responded with a field goal, before Winslow appeared to have extended the lead with a 38-yard touchdown catch. It was ruled out by a holding penalty, but the Chargers scored anyway, Brooks going straight up the middle on a 48-yard run. Late in the 3rd quarter, a Muncie fumble set up Anderson's second touchdown pass, pulling the Bengals within six points. A 32-yard Winslow reception led to a Benirschke field goal, and a 43-34 lead. Anderson led his team to the Chargers 28 before Fox's interception and 41-yard return gave San Diego the ball in Cincinnati territory. Catches of 19- and 20-yards by Chandler were followed by Brooks' one-yard touchdown to make the game safe.

With 435 passing yards, Fouts became the first quarterback to post consecutive 400-yard passing games. The teams combined for 66 completions and 889 passing yards in the game, both NFL records at the time. They combined for 1,102 yards, of which the Chargers had 661. This yardage total remains as franchise record, as does Chandler's 260 receiving yards. Winslow added 6 catches for 116 yards, while Brooks had his lone 100-yard rushing game for the Chargers.

==== Week 8: vs. Baltimore Colts ====
Week Eight: Baltimore Colts at San Diego Chargers – Game summary

Quarter	1	2	3	4	Total
Colts	0	3	10	13	**26**
Chargers	7	16	14	7	**44**

at Jack Murphy Stadium, San Diego, California

- Date: December 26
- Game time: 1:00 p.m. PST
- Game weather: 55 °F (12.8 °C), relative humidity 29%, wind 10 miles per hour (16 km/h; 8.7 kn)
- Game attendance: 49,711
- Referee: Fred Silva
- TV announcers (NBC): Charlie Jones and Len Dawson
- Box score

Game information

**First quarter**

- SDG – Kellen Winslow 30-yard pass from Dan Fouts (Rolf Benirschke kick), 1:09. Chargers 7–0. **Drive: 10 plays, 76 yards, 4:39.**

**Second quarter**

- SDG – Rolf Benirschke 45-yard field goal, 10:58. Chargers 10–0. **Drive: 9 plays, 49 yards, 3:26.**
- SDG – Wes Chandler 41-yard pass from Dan Fouts (kick failed), 7:20. Chargers 16–0. **Drive: 4 plays, 65 yards, 1:39.**
- SDG – Kellen Winslow 13-yard pass from Dan Fouts (Rolf Benirschke kick), 2:01. Chargers 23–0. **Drive: 4 plays, 65 yards, 1:14.**
- BAL – Dan Miller 46-yard field goal, 0:05. Chargers 23–3. **Drive: 2 plays, 0 yards, 0:09.**

**Third quarter**

- BAL – Matt Bouza 15-yard pass from Mike Pagel (Dan Miller kick), 13:27. Chargers 23–10. **Drive: 3 plays, 33 yards, 1:33.**
- BAL – Dan Miller 58-yard field goal, 9:47. Chargers 23–13. **Drive: 4 plays, 9 yards, 1:58.**
- SDG – James Brooks 8-yard run (Rolf Benirschke kick), 6:00. Chargers 30–13. **Drive: 9 plays, 75 yards, 3:47.**
- SDG – Wes Chandler 44-yard pass from Dan Fouts (Rolf Benirschke kick), 2:38. Chargers 37–13. **Drive: 4 plays, 58 yards, 1:27.**

**Fourth quarter**

- BAL – Curtis Dickey 1-yard run (pass failed), 12:28. Chargers 37–19. **Drive: 11 plays, 66 yards, 3:45.**
- SDG – Kellen Winslow 28-yard pass from Dan Fouts (Rolf Benirschke kick), 8:24. Chargers 44–19. **Drive: 6 plays, 63 yards, 4:04.**
- BAL – Tim Sherwin offensive fumble recovery in end zone (Dan Miller kick), 3:21. Chargers 44–26. **Drive: 3 plays, 25 yards, 1:29.**

**Top passers**

- BAL – Mike Pagel – 17/25, 186 yards, TD, INT
- SDG – Dan Fouts – 18/30, 298 yards, 5 TD, INT

**Top rushers**

- BAL – Randy McMillan – 11 rushes, 39 yards
- SDG – Chuck Muncie – 16 rushes, 126 yards

**Top receivers**

- BAL – Matt Bouza – 5 receptions, 72 yards, TD
- SDG – Kellen Winslow – 7 receptions, 120 yards, 3 TD

Baltimore drove into Chargers territory on their first two possessions, but both drives ended with fumbles that Thrift recovered. Following the second of these, the Chargers drove 76 yards for Winslow's first touchdown. Baltimore went three-and-out after a sack by Woodrow Lowe, and Benirschke added a field goal. The next two San Diego possessions were both 4-play, 65-yard touchdown drives, with Chandler scoring his first touchdown, and Muncie's 27-yard run setting up Winslow's second. A Fouts interception gave Baltimore the ball at the Chargers' 28-yard line with 14 seconds left in the half; they scored a field goal and reduced their deficit to 23–3.

Brooks fumbled the second half kickoff, and Baltimore recovered at the Chargers 33-yard line. They scored a touchdown three plays later, and added a field goal on their next drive to pull within ten points. San Diego responded by driving 75 yards in 9 plays without facing a third down: Winslow had 3 catches for 44 yards and Brooks ran the ball in from the Baltimore 8. Williams intercepted a pass that Fox deflected, and Chandler brought in a long pass for a 44-yard touchdown. Jones recovered a fumbled snap two plays later, but Benirschke was short with a 53-yard field goal attempt. Baltimore scored a touchdown early in the final quarter, but Muncie ran 4 times for 27 yards on the answering drive and Winslow caught Fouts' fifth touchdown pass of the game. Backup quarterback Ed Luther came in and threw an interception that Baltimore converted into their final touchdown.

San Diego clinched a playoff place with the win. It was their third consecutive game with over 40 points and over 500 yards. Winslow caught 7 for 120 yards and three touchdowns, while Chandler scored twice and gained 118 yards on just 4 catches.

==== Week 9: vs. Los Angeles Raiders ====
Week Nine: Los Angeles Raiders at San Diego Chargers – Game summary

Quarter	1	2	3	4	Total
Raiders	0	10	10	21	**41**
Chargers	3	0	17	14	**34**

at Jack Murphy Stadium, San Diego, California

- Date: January 2
- Game time: 1:00 p.m. PST
- Game weather: 53 °F (11.7 °C), relative humidity 43%, wind 7 miles per hour (11 km/h; 6.1 kn)
- Game attendance: 51,612
- Referee: Jim Tunney
- TV announcers (NBC): Dick Enberg and Merlin Olsen
- Box score

Game information

**First quarter**

- SDG – Rolf Benirschke 27-yard field goal, 4:07. Chargers 3–0. **Drive: 14 plays, 69 yards, 6:02.**

**Second quarter**

- RAI – Chris Bahr 22-yard field goal, 14:57. Tied 3–3. **Drive: 9 plays, 59 yards, 3:59.**
- RAI – Frank Hawkins 2-yard pass from Jim Plunkett (Chris Bahr kick), 9:09. Raiders 10–3. **Drive: 8 plays, 80 yards, 4:32.**

**Third quarter**

- RAI – Mike Davis 56-yard interception return (Chris Bahr kick), 14:38. Raiders 17–3.
- RAI – Chris Bahr 32-yard field goal, 9:39. Raiders 20–3. **Drive: 7 plays, 44 yards, 3:26.**
- SDG – Wes Chandler 25-yard pass from Dan Fouts (Rolf Benirschke kick), 8:38. Raiders 20–10. **Drive: 3 plays, 75 yards, 0:53.**
- SDG – Rolf Benirschke 23-yard field goal, 3:30. Raiders 20–13. **Drive: 9 plays, 41 yards, 3:19.**
- SDG – Chuck Muncie 2-yard run (Rolf Benirschke kick), 1:52. Tied 20–20. **Drive: 3 plays, 19 yards, 1:15.**

**Fourth quarter**

- SDG – Chuck Muncie 1-yard run (Rolf Benirschke kick), 10:21. Chargers 27–20. **Drive: 7 plays, 80 yards, 3:51.**
- RAI – Marcus Allen 2-yard run (Chris Bahr kick), 5:24. Tied 27–27. **Drive: 10 plays, 87 yards, 4:47.**
- RAI – James Davis 52-yard interception return (Chris Bahr kick), 2:41. Raiders 34–27.
- RAI – Marcus Allen 22-yard run (Chris Bahr kick), 1:37. Raiders 41–27. **Drive: 3 plays, 31 yards, 0:18.**
- SDG – Dan Fouts 4-yard run (Rolf Benirschke kick), 0:08. Raiders 41–34. **Drive: 6 plays, 70 yards, 1:26.**

**Top passers**

- RAI – Jim Plunkett – 17/28, 227 yards, TD
- SDG – Dan Fouts – 18/38, 303 yards, TD, 2 INT

**Top rushers**

- RAI – Marcus Allen – 20 rushes, 126 yards, 2 TD
- SDG – Chuck Muncie – 26 rushes, 129 yards, 2 TD

**Top receivers**

- RAI – Todd Christensen – 6 receptions, 86 yards
- SDG – Wes Chandler – 6 receptions, 138 yards, TD

With a win, the Chargers could clinch the second seed in the eight-team AFC playoffs. Chandler had catches of 27 yards (on 3rd and 17) and 21 yards on the first San Diego drive, setting up a Benirschke field goal. Los Angeles responded with ten points on their next two drives. Late in the half, Chandler drew a 43-yard pass interference penalty, giving San Diego a 1st and goal at the 6-yard line. The drive stalled, and Benirschke missed a 20-yard field goal, keeping the halftime score at 10–3.

Brooks returned the second half kickoff for 42 yards, but Mike Davis intercepted Fouts on the next play and returned it for a touchdown; when Los Angeles added a field goal on their next drive, they led by seventeen points. Chandler start the next drive with a 31-yard catch and finishing it two plays later with a 25-yard touchdown. Runs of 15 and 13 yards by Muncie set up a field goal on the next drive, and Pete Holohan recovered a fumble on the ensuing kickoff. Starting at the Raiders 19-yard line, Muncie caught a 16-yard pass and followed with runs of 1 and 2 yards to tie the score. San Diego forced a punt after Ferguson sacked Plunkett, then drove 80 yards to take the lead: Muncie had a 15-yard run, Winslow caught a 22-yard pass, and Muncie scored from a yard out. Oakland tied the score with an 87-yard touchdown drive. San Diego moved from their own 8-yard line to a 3rd and 7 on their 48, but Fouts threw another interception, which James Davis ran back for the go-ahead score. The Chargers turned the ball over on downs, and the Raiders added another touchdown. Fouts ran in a touchdown with 8 seconds remaining, but the Raiders recovered the ensuing onside kick.

Chandler had his fourth straight 100-yard game. Ferguson finished with 2 1/2 sacks. San Diego lost despite outgaining the Raiders by 438 yards to 354. Their final four games of the regular season featured 307 points (169 scored, 138 conceded).

=== Standings ===
AFC West
	W	L	T	PCT	DIV	CONF	PF	PA	STK
^{(1)} Los Angeles Raiders	8	1	0	.889	5–0	5–1	260	200	W5
^{(5)} San Diego Chargers	6	3	0	.667	2–3	5–3	288	221	L1
Seattle Seahawks	4	5	0	.444	2–1	3–5	127	147	W1
Kansas City Chiefs	3	6	0	.333	2–1	3–3	176	184	W1
Denver Broncos	2	7	0	.222	0–6	0–6	148	226	L3

AFC
#	Team	W	L	T	PCT	PF	PA	STK
**Seeded postseason qualifiers**
1	Los Angeles Raiders	8	1	0	.889	260	200	W5
2 (Note: Miami finished ahead of Cincinnati based on better conference record (6–1 to Cincinnati’s 6–2).)	Miami Dolphins	7	2	0	.778	198	131	W3
3	Cincinnati Bengals	7	2	0	.778	232	177	W2
4 (Note: Pittsburgh finished ahead of San Diego based on better record against common opponents (3–1 to Chargers' 2–1). Conference tiebreak was initially used to eliminate New York Jets.) (Note: Pittsburgh and San Diego finished ahead of New York Jets based on conference record (Pittsburgh and San Diego 5–3 against Jets’ 2–3))	Pittsburgh Steelers	6	3	0	.667	204	146	W2
5	San Diego Chargers	6	3	0	.667	288	221	L1
6	New York Jets	6	3	0	.667	245	166	L1
7	New England Patriots	5	4	0	.556	143	157	W1
8 (Note: Cleveland finished ahead of Buffalo and Buffalo ahead of Seattle based on conference record (4–3 to Buffalo’s 3–3 to Seattle’s 3–5).)	Cleveland Browns	4	5	0	.444	140	182	L1
**Did not qualify for the postseason**
9	Buffalo Bills	4	5	0	.444	150	154	L3
10	Seattle Seahawks	4	5	0	.444	127	147	W1
11	Kansas City Chiefs	3	6	0	.333	176	184	W1
12	Denver Broncos	2	7	0	.222	148	226	L3
13	Houston Oilers	1	8	0	.111	136	245	L7
14	Baltimore Colts	0	8	1	.056	113	236	L2
**Tiebreakers**

== Postseason ==
Round	Date	Opponent (seed)	Result	Record	Venue	Attendance	Recap
First round	January 9, 1983	at Pittsburgh Steelers (4)	W 31–28	1–0	Three Rivers Stadium	53,546	Recap
Second round	January 16, 1983	at Miami Dolphins (2)	L 13–34	1–1	Miami Orange Bowl	71,383	Recap

=== Game summaries ===
==== AFC First Round playoffs: at (4) Pittsburgh Steelers ====
AFC First Round Playoffs: (5) San Diego Chargers at (4) Pittsburgh Steelers – Game summary

Quarter	1	2	3	4	Total
Chargers	3	14	0	14	31
Steelers	14	0	7	7	28

at Three Rivers Stadium, Pittsburgh, Pennsylvania

- Date: January 9
- Game time: 12:30 p.m. EST
- Game weather: 39 °F (3.9 °C), cloudy
- Game attendance: 53,546
- Referee: Bob Frederic
- TV announcers (NBC): Dick Enberg and Merlin Olsen
- Box score

Game information

First quarter

- PIT – Guy Ruff fumble recovery in end zone (Gary Anderson kick), 14:48. Steelers 7–0.
- SDG – Rolf Benirschke 25-yard field goal, 10:10. Steelers 7–3. Drive: 11 plays, 91 yards, 4:38.
- PIT – Terry Bradshaw 1-yard run (Gary Anderson kick), 4:54. Steelers 14–3. Drive: 9 plays, 71 yards, 5:16.

Second quarter

- SDG – James Brooks 18-yard run (Rolf Benirschke kick), 14:54. Steelers 14–10. Drive: 11 plays, 80 yards, 5:00.
- SDG – Eric Sievers 10-yard pass from Dan Fouts (Rolf Benirschke kick), 0:28. Chargers 17–14. Drive: 7 plays, 64 yards, 1:18.

Third quarter

- PIT – Bennie Cunningham 2-yard pass from Terry Bradshaw (Gary Anderson kick), 10:12. Steelers 21–17. Drive: 8 plays, 74 yards, 4:48.

Fourth quarter

- PIT – John Stallworth 14-yard pass from Terry Bradshaw (Gary Anderson kick), 14:10. Steelers 28–17. Drive: 10 plays, 86 yards, 5:37.
- SDG – Kellen Winslow 8-yard pass from Dan Fouts (Rolf Benirschke kick), 8:42. Steelers 28–24. Drive: 5 plays, 29 yards, 2:19.
- SDG – Kellen Winslow 12-yard pass from Dan Fouts (Rolf Benirschke kick), 1:00. Chargers 31–28. Drive: 8 plays, 64 yards, 2:59.

Top passers

- SDG – Dan Fouts – 27/42, 333 yards, 3 TD
- PIT – Terry Bradshaw – 28/39, 325 yards, 2 TD, 2 INT

Top rushers

- SDG – Chuck Muncie – 25 rushes, 126 yards
- PIT – Frank Pollard – 9 rushes, 47 yards

Top receivers

- SDG – Wes Chandler – 9 receptions, 124 yards
- PIT – John Stallworth – 8 receptions, 116 yards, TD

Brooks fumbled the opening kickoff, and the Steelers recovered in the end zone for a touchdown only 12 seconds into the game. He also fumbled the next kickoff, though he was able to recover at the San Diego 2-yard line. Joiner had a 12-yard catch on 3rd and 11 soon afterwards, and Chandler caught 4 passes for 46 as the Chargers drove 91 yards before kicking a field goal. Pittsburgh scored a touchdown on their next drive, taking an early 14–3 lead. Chandler had a 10-yard catch on 3rd and 8 on the following drive, which ended with Brooks' 18-yard touchdown run. Joiner converted a 3rd and 12 with a 13-yard catch on the next Chargers possession, and Winslow followed up with a 30-yard catch on the next play. The drive reached 3rd and 7 at the Steelers 20-yard line, from where Winslow caught an 8-yard pass before losing a fumble. Pittsburgh also missed a chance, gaining a first down at the San Diego 29 before Laird intercepted Terry Bradshaw at the 1-yard line and returned the ball 35 yards. Chandler's 33-yard catch converted a 3rd and 2, setting up Eric Sievers' touchdown and a 17–14 halftime lead.

The Steelers opened the second half with a touchdown drive. Chandler's 22-yard catch converted a 3rd and 20, and San Diego reached a 4th and 1 from the Pittsburgh 14-yard line. They went for the conversion, but John Cappelletti was stopped for no gain. From there, the Steelers drove for another touchdown and led 28–17 early in the final quarter. San Diego were forced to punt, but Allen intercepted Bradshaw three plays later, returning the ball 8 yards to the Pittsburgh 29-yard line. Fouts appeared to have also been intercepted, but San Diego kept the ball due to a Steelers penalty. They reached 4th and 6 from the 8, from where Winslow caught a touchdown to pull within four points. Pittsburgh punted, leaving the Chargers four minutes to move 64 yards. Winslow had a 16-yard catch early in the drive, and Muncie ran 13 yards on a 3rd and 1; Winslow's winning touchdown came on a screen pass on 3rd and 7 from the 12-yard line with a minute left. The Steelers advanced as far as San Diego's 49-yard line before Bradshaw's final pass was incomplete as the game finished.

San Diego had two 100-yard receivers (Chandler 9 catches for 124 yards, Winslow 7 for 102 and 2 touchdowns) to go with Muncie's 25 runs for 126 rushing yards. They gained 479 on offense. Chargers go to the second AFC round but lost to the Dolphins 34–13.

==== AFC Second Round Playoffs: at (2) Miami Dolphins ====
AFC Second Round Playoffs: (5) San Diego Chargers at (2) Miami Dolphins – Game summary

Quarter	1	2	3	4	Total
Chargers	0	13	0	0	13
Dolphins	7	20	0	7	34

at Miami Orange Bowl, Miami, Florida

- Date: January 16
- Game time: 12:30 p.m. EST
- Game weather: 64 °F (17.8 °C), mostly cloudy
- Game attendance: 71,383
- Referee: Jerry Markbreit
- TV announcers (NBC): Don Criqui, John Brodie and Bob Griese
- Box score

Game information

First quarter

- MIA – Nat Moore 3-yard pass from David Woodley (Uwe von Schamann kick), 8:08. Dolphins 7–0. Drive: 5 plays, 26 yards, 2:53.

Second quarter

- MIA – Andra Franklin 3-yard run (Uwe von Schamann kick), 13:32. Dolphins 14–0. Drive: 13 plays, 89 yards, 5:56.
- MIA – Ronnie Lee 6-yard pass from David Woodley (Uwe von Schamann kick), 10:29. Dolphins 21–0. Drive: 7 plays, 23 yards, 2:53.
- MIA – Uwe von Schamann 24-yard field goal, 7:45. Dolphins 24–0. Drive: 7 plays, 30 yards, 2:32.
- SDG – Charlie Joiner 28-yard pass from Dan Fouts (kick failed), 3:46. Dolphins 24–6. Drive: 3 plays, 28 yards, 0:21.
- MIA – Uwe von Schamann 23-yard field goal, 1:05. Dolphins 27–6. Drive: 7 plays, 70 yards, 2:44.
- SDG – Chuck Muncie 1-yard run (Rolf Benirschke kick), 0:22. Dolphins 27–13. Drive: 5 plays, 76 yards, 0:43.

Third quarter

- No scoring plays.

Fourth quarter

- MIA – David Woodley 7-yard run (Uwe von Schamann kick), 14:18. Dolphins 34–13. Drive: 8 plays, 62 yards, 3:45.

Top passers

- SDG – Dan Fouts – 15/34, 191 yards, TD, 5 INT
- MIA – David Woodley – 17/22, 195 yards, 2 TD, INT

Top rushers

- SDG – Chuck Muncie – 11 rushes, 62 yards, TD
- MIA – Andra Franklin – 23 rushes, 96 yards, TD

Top receivers

- SDG – Chuck Muncie] – 6 receptions, 53 yards
- MIA – Jimmy Cefalo – 2 receptions, 69 yards

Fouts' second pass attempt of the game was intercepted, leaving the Dolphins to drive only 24 yards for the opening touchdown. Miami forced a punt, then doubled their lead with an 89-yard touchdown drive. Bauer fumbled the ensuing kickoff, with Miami recovering and going 23 yards for their third touchdown. The next kickoff was also fumbled, with Brooks losing the ball to set up a Dolphins field goal and 24–0 lead midway through the 2nd quarter. An exchange of punts followed: Brooks' 10-yard return was increased by 15 further yards by a facemask penalty, and San Diego took over at the Miami 28-yard line. After two incompletions, Fouts connected with Joiner for a touchdown. The Dolphins responded with a field goal with barely a minute left before halftime. Aided by two penalties for 25 yards, San Diego quickly moved into Miami territory; Chandler's 22-yard catch took them to the 1-yard line, and Muncie scored on the next play, reducing the halftime deficit to 27–13.

Muncie's 18-yard catch on the first play of the second half took the Chargers to the Miami 45-yard line before the drive stalled and they were forced to punt. Fox's interception of David Woodley set his offense up at the Dolphins 33, but Fouts was sacked on third down and they had to punt again. Miami moved from their own 20 to a 1st and goal at the 7-yard line before Lowe stopped the drive with a fumble recovery. The Chargers faced 4th and 3 at their own 45 on the ensuing drive, which they converted when Cappelletti ran 5 yards with a fake punt. They picked up one more first down reaching the Dolphins 36-yard line before Fouts was intercepted. This time, Miami drove 62 yards for the game's final points. Needing three touchdowns, Fouts converted a 4th and 12 from his own 49 with a 16-yard pass to Sievers, but was intercepted two plays later. He threw further interceptions in his own territory on the final two San Diego drives, giving him four in as many possessions and five in total.

San Diego gained only 247 yards on offense after averaging a league-high 450 per game during the regular season. They turned the ball over seven times in total, including the two special teams fumbles. They didn't return to the playoffs until ten years later, following the 1992 season. Chargers lost and in 1983 missed the playoffs 6-10.

== Awards ==
Seven Chargers were named to the 1983 Pro Bowl, and a total of seven were named first or second team Associated Press (AP) All-Pros. Fouts finished in second place for the AP NFL Most Valuable Player (Mark Moseley had 35 votes, Fouts had 33), and won the AP NFL Offensive Player of the Year with 43 of the 80 votes; Chandler and Winslow were among the runners-up for that award with 3 and 2 votes respectively. Fouts won a league MVP award from the Pro Football Writers of America, as well as the player-awarded Jim Thorpe Trophy.

Player	Position	Pro Bowl starter	Pro Bowl reserve	AP 1st team All-Pro	AP 2nd team All-Pro
Rolf Benirschke	Kicker	Yes			
Wes Chandler	Wide receiver	Yes		Yes	
Dan Fouts	Quarterback	Yes		Yes	
Tim Fox	Safety				Yes
Gary Johnson	Defensive tackle	Yes			Yes
Chuck Muncie	Running back		Yes		
Russ Washington	Tackle				Yes
Doug Wilkerson	Guard	Yes		Yes	
Kellen Winslow	Tight end	Yes		Yes	
