= 1982 Los Angeles Raiders season =

NFL team season

- Owner: Al Davis
- General manager: Al Davis
- Head coach: Tom Flores
- Defensive coordinator: Charlie Sumner
- Home stadium: Los Angeles Memorial Coliseum

Results
- Record: 8–1
- Division place: 1st AFC
- Playoffs: Won Wild Card Playoffs (vs. Browns) 27–10; Lost Divisional Playoffs (vs. Jets) 14–17
- All-Pros: RB Marcus Allen; OLB Ted Hendricks
- Pro Bowlers: RB Marcus Allen; OLB Ted Hendricks; CB Lester Hayes

The 1982 Los Angeles Raiders season was the team's 23rd season, 13th season in the National Football League (NFL) and first of 13 seasons in Los Angeles.

In May 1982, a lawsuit brought by the Raiders and the Los Angeles Memorial Coliseum in 1980 concluded, with the jury determining that the NFL violated antitrust laws when it rejected the proposed move by the team from Oakland to Los Angeles. The Raiders promptly moved to Los Angeles, although for the 1982 season, the team continued to practice in Oakland.

Despite the Raiders' disappointing 7–9 record in their previous season—their last in Oakland until 1995—the team cruised to an 8–1 record in the strike-shortened 1982 season, winning all four of their home games and clinching home-field advantage throughout the NFL's makeshift playoff tournament for 1982. However, in the second round of the playoffs, the Raiders blew a fourth-quarter lead to the sixth-seeded Jets, losing 17–14.

== Offseason ==
1982 Los Angeles Raiders draft
Round	Pick	Player	Position	College	Notes
1	10	Marcus Allen * ^{†}	RB	USC	
2	35	Jack Squirek	LB	Illinois	
2	37	Jim Romano	C	Penn State	
3	64	Vann McElroy	S	Baylor	
4	91	Ed Muransky	G	Michigan	
5	123	Ed Jackson	LB	Louisiana Tech	
7	177	Jeff Jackson	DE	Toledo	
10	263	Rich D'Amico	LB	Penn State	
11	289	Willie Turner	WR	LSU	
12	316	Randy Smith	WR	Texas A&M-Commerce	
Made roster † Pro Football Hall of Fame * Made at least one Pro Bowl during career

== Personnel ==
=== Staff / Coaches ===
1982 Los Angeles Raiders staff
Front office: Principal Owner / Managing General Partner - Al Davis; Minority Co-Owner - Eddie McGah; President of the General Partner / General Manager – Al Davis; Director of Football Operations - Steve Ortmayer; Executive Assistant / Scout - Al LoCasale; Head coaches: Head Coach – Tom Flores; Offensive coaches: Quality Control / Qurterbacks Coach - Larry Kennan; Running Backs – Ray Willsey; Offensive Line – Sam Boghosian; Tight Ends - Bob Mischak; Wide Receivers / Quarterbacks - Tom Walsh; Offensive Assistant - Joe Madro	Defensive coaches: Defensive Coordinator / Linebackers - Charlie Sumner; Defensive Line – Earl Leggett; Defensive Backs – Chet Franklin; Special Assistant / Defensive Backfield Coach - Willie Brown; Special teams coaches: Special Teams Coach - Steve Ortmayer; Strength and conditioning: Strength and Conditioning - Bob Mischak

=== Roster ===
1982 Los Angeles Raiders roster
Quarterbacks (QB): 16 Jim Plunkett; 6 Marc Wilson; Running backs (RB): 32 Marcus Allen; 40 Rick Berns; 27 Frank Hawkins; 31 Derrick Jensen; 33 Kenny King; 28 Cleo Montgomery; 34 Greg Pruitt; 38 Chester Willis; Wide receivers (WR): 80 Malcolm Barnwell; 21 Cliff Branch; 82 Calvin Muhammad; Tight ends (TE): 46 Todd Christensen; 84 Derrick Ramsey	Offensive linemen (OL): 50 Dave Dalby C; 79 Bruce Davis T; 70 Henry Lawrence T; 60 Curt Marsh G; 65 Mickey Marvin G; 76 Ed Muransky T; 52 Jim Romano C; 78 Art Shell T; 66 Steve Sylvester G; 67 Randy Van Divier T; Defensive linemen (DL): 77 Lyle Alzado DE; 62 Reggie Kinlaw NT; 75 Howie Long DE; 74 Archie Reese DE; 68 Johnny Robinson NT; 99 Ruben Vaughan DE	Linebackers (LB): 56 Jeff Barnes OLB; 83 Ted Hendricks OLB; 53 Rod Martin OLB; 57 Randy McClanahan ILB; 55 Matt Millen ILB; 51 Bob Nelson ILB; 58 Jack Squirek ILB; Defensive backs (DB): 36 Mike Davis SS; 37 Lester Hayes CB; 48 Kenny Hill SS; 42 Monte Jackson CB; 26 Vann McElroy FS; 23 Odis McKinney CB/S; 44 Burgess Owens FS; 20 Ted Watts CB; 45 James Davis CB; Special teams (ST): 10 Chris Bahr K; 8 Ray Guy P	Reserve: 59 Stan Adams LB (IR); 73 Dave Browning DE (IR); 85 Bob Chandler WR (IR); -- David Dorn WR (IR); 57 Mike Hawkins LB (IR); 90 Willie Jones DE (IR); 72 John Matuszak DE (IR); 54 Cal Peterson LB (IR); 25 Irvin Phillips CB (IR); 63 Gene Upshaw G (IR); Rookies in italics

== Season ==
=== Schedule ===
Week	Date	Opponent	Result	Record	Venue	Attendance	Recap
1	September 12	at San Francisco 49ers	**W** 23–17	1–0	Candlestick Park	59,748	Recap
2	September 19	at Atlanta Falcons	**W** 38–14	2–0	Atlanta–Fulton County Stadium	54,774	Recap
Players' strike
11	November 22	**San Diego Chargers**	**W** 28–24	3–0	Los Angeles Memorial Coliseum	42,162	Recap
12	November 28	at Cincinnati Bengals	**L** 17–31	3–1	Riverfront Stadium	53,330	Recap
13	December 5	**Seattle Seahawks**	**W** 28–23	4–1	Los Angeles Memorial Coliseum	42,170	Recap
14	December 12	at **Kansas City Chiefs**	**W** 21–16	5–1	Arrowhead Stadium	26,307	Recap
15	December 18	Los Angeles Rams	**W** 37–31	6–1	Los Angeles Memorial Coliseum	56,646	Recap
16	December 26	**Denver Broncos**	**W** 27–10	7–1	Los Angeles Memorial Coliseum	44,160	Recap
17	January 2	at **San Diego Chargers**	**W** 41–34	8–1	San Diego Stadium	51,612	Recap
Note: Intra-division opponents are in **bold** text.

=== Season summary ===
==== Week 1 ====
Week One: Los Angeles Raiders (0–0) at San Francisco 49ers (0–0)

Quarter	1	2	3	4	Total
**Raiders**	3	10	0	10	**23**
49ers	0	14	3	0	**17**

at Candlestick Park, San Francisco, California

- Date: September 12, 1982
- Game time: 4:00 p.m. EST
- Game weather: 65 °F (18.3 °C)
- Game attendance: 59,748
- Referee: Jerry Markbreit
- TV announcers (NBC): Dick Enberg and John Brodie
- Pro-Football-Reference.com

Game information

**First quarter**

- LA – Chris Bahr 41-yard field goal. Raiders 3–0. Drive:

**Second quarter**

- SF – Freddie Solomon 18-yard pass from Joe Montana (Ray Wersching kick). 49ers 7–3. Drive:
- LA – Chris Bahr 42-yard field goal. 49ers 7–6. Drive:
- SF – Dwight Clark 41-yard pass from Joe Montana (Ray Wersching kick). 49ers 14–6. Drive:
- LA – Marcus Allen 3-yard run (Chris Bahr kick). 49ers 14–13. Drive:

**Third quarter**

- SF – Ray Wersching 22 yard field goal. 49ers 17–13. Drive:

**Fourth quarter**

- LA – Todd Christensen 3-yard pass from Jim Plunkett (Chris Bahr kick). Raiders 20–17. Drive:
- LA – Chris Bahr 43-yard field goal. 'Raiders 23–17. Drive:

Top passers

- LA – Jim Plunkett – 12/20, 123 yards, TD, 2 INT
- SF – Joe Montana – 21/41, 244 yards, 2 TD, INT

Top rushers

- LA – Marcus Allen – 23 rushes, 116 yards, TD
- SF – Jeff Moore – 7 rushes, 30 yards

Top receivers

- LA – Marcus Allen – 4 receptions, 64 yards
- SF – Dwight Clark – 6 receptions, 106 yards, TD

==== Week 2 ====
Team	1	2	3	4	Total
• Raiders	7	17	7	7	38
Falcons	7	0	7	0	14

- Date: September 19
- Location: Atlanta–Fulton County Stadium, Atlanta
- Game start: 1:00 p.m. EST
- Game attendance: 54,774
- Game weather: 76 °F (24.4 °C); wind 7 miles per hour (11 km/h; 6.1 kn)
- Referee: Fred Silva
- TV announcers (NBC): Dick Enberg and Len Dawson

Scoring summary
Q1	LA	Allen 14-yard pass from Plunkett (Bahr kick)	LA 7–0
Q1	ATL	Andrews 1 yard run (Luckhurst kick)	Tie 7–7
Q2	LA	Bahr 35-yard field goal	LA 10–7
Q2	LA	Allen 4-yard run (Bahr kick)	LA 17–7
Q2	LA	Branch 30-yard pass from Plunkett (Bahr kick)	LA 24–7
Q3	LA	Hawkins 1 yard run (Bahr kick)	LA 31–7
Q3	ATL	Robinson 17-yard pass from Bartkowski (Luckhurst kick)	LA 31–14
Q4	LA	Reese 75-yard fumble return (Bahr kick)	LA 38–14

==== Week 3 ====
This was the first home regular-season game in Los Angeles for the Raiders.

Team	1	2	3	4	Total
Chargers	10	14	0	0	24
• Raiders	0	7	14	7	28

- Date: November 22
- Location: Los Angeles Memorial Coliseum, Los Angeles
- Game start: 9:00 p.m. EST
- Game attendance: 42,162
- Game weather: 57 °F (13.9 °C); wind 7 miles per hour (11 km/h; 6.1 kn)
- Referee: Bob McElwee
- TV announcers (ABC): Frank Gifford, Howard Cosell, Don Meredith

Scoring summary
Q1		SD	Benirschke 19-yard field goal	SD 3–0
Q1		SD	Scales 29-yard pass from Fouts (Benirschke kick)	SD 10–0
Q2		SD	Muncie 2-yard run (Benirschke kick)	SD 17–0
Q2		SD	Muncie 1 yard run (Benirschke kick)	SD 24–0
Q2	:42	LA	Christensen 1 yard pass from Plunkett (Bahr kick)	SD 24–7
Q3		LA	Allen 3-yard run (Bahr kick)	SD 24–14
Q3	2:23	LA	Allen 6-yard run (Bahr kick)	SD 24–21
Q4		LA	Hawkins 1 yard run (Bahr kick)	LA 28–24

==== Week 5 ====
Team	1	2	3	4	Total
Seahawks	0	7	0	16	23
• Raiders	7	21	0	0	28

- Date: December 5
- Location: Los Angeles Memorial Coliseum, Los Angeles
- Game start: 4:00 p.m.
- Game weather: 57 °F (13.9 °C); wind 7 miles per hour (11 km/h; 6.1 kn)
- Referee: Gordon McCarter

Scoring summary
Q1	LA	Allen 2-yard run (Bahr kick)	LA 7–0
Q2	LA	King 1 yard run (Bahr kick)	LA 14–0
Q2	LA	Martin 39-yard interception return (Bahr kick)	LA 21–0
Q2	LA	Allen 3-yard run (Bahr kick)	LA 28–0
Q2	SEA	Largent 10-yard pass from Zorn (Johnson kick)	LA 28–7
Q4	SEA	Brown 3-yard run (kick failed)	LA 28–13
Q4	SEA	Carr 23-yard pass from Zorn (Johnson kick)	LA 28–20
Q4	SEA	Johnson 30-yard field goal	LA 28–23

- Marcus Allen 24 Rush, 156 Yds

==== Week 6 ====
Team	1	2	3	4	Total
• Raiders	0	7	0	14	21
Chiefs	3	3	3	7	16

- Date: December 12
- Location: Arrowhead Stadium, Kansas City, Missouri
- Game start: 4:00 p.m.
- Game weather: 17 °F (−8.3 °C); wind 8 miles per hour (13 km/h; 7.0 kn)
- Referee: Fred Wyant
- TV announcers (NBC): Charlie Jones, Len Dawson

Scoring summary
Q1	KC	Lowery 35-yard field goal	KC 3–0
Q2	LA	Christensen 4-yard pass from Plunkett (Bahr kick)	LA 7–3
Q2	KC	Lowery 27-yard field goal	LA 7–6
Q3	KC	Lowery 29-yard field goal	KC 9–7
Q4	LA	Christensen 8-yard pass from Plunkett (Bahr kick)	LA 14–9
Q4	KC	Jackson 1 yard run (Lowery kick)	KC 16–14
Q4	LA	Muhammad 35-yard pass from Plunkett (Bahr kick)	LA 21–16

- Jim Plunkett 18/33, 303 Yds

==== Week 8 ====
Team	1	2	3	4	Total
Broncos	0	0	0	10	10
• Raiders	3	24	0	0	27

- Date: December 26
- Location: Los Angeles Memorial Coliseum, Los Angeles
- Game start: 1:00 p.m.
- Game weather: 52 °F (11.1 °C), wind 8 miles per hour (13 km/h; 7.0 kn)
- Referee: Red Cashion

Scoring summary
1	LA	Chris Bahr 19-yard field goal	Raiders 3–0
2	LA	Marcus Allen 4-yard pass from Jim Plunkett (Chris Bahr kick)	Raiders 10–0
2	LA	Kenny King 5-yard run (Chris Bahr kick)	Raiders 17–0
2	LA	Marcus Allen 51-yard pass from Jim Plunkett (Chris Bahr kick)	Raiders 24–0
2	LA	Chris Bahr 36-yard field goal	Raiders 27–0
4	DEN	Rich Karlis 31-yard field goal	Raiders 27–3
4	DEN	Steve Watson 18-yard pass from Mark Herrmann (Rich Karlis kick)	Raiders 27–10

== Standings ==
AFC West
	W	L	T	PCT	DIV	CONF	PF	PA	STK
^{(1)} Los Angeles Raiders	8	1	0	.889	5–0	5–1	260	200	W5
^{(5)} San Diego Chargers	6	3	0	.667	2–3	5–3	288	221	L1
Seattle Seahawks	4	5	0	.444	2–1	3–5	127	147	W1
Kansas City Chiefs	3	6	0	.333	2–1	3–3	176	184	W1
Denver Broncos	2	7	0	.222	0–6	0–6	148	226	L3

AFC
#	Team	W	L	T	PCT	PF	PA	STK
Seeded postseason qualifiers
1	Los Angeles Raiders	8	1	0	.889	260	200	W5
2 (Note: Miami finished ahead of Cincinnati based on better conference record (6–1 to Cincinnati’s 6–2).)	Miami Dolphins	7	2	0	.778	198	131	W3
3	Cincinnati Bengals	7	2	0	.778	232	177	W2
4 (Note: Pittsburgh finished ahead of San Diego based on better record against common opponents (3–1 to Chargers' 2–1). Conference tiebreak was initially used to eliminate New York Jets.) (Note: Pittsburgh and San Diego finished ahead of New York Jets based on conference record (Pittsburgh and San Diego 5–3 against Jets’ 2–3))	Pittsburgh Steelers	6	3	0	.667	204	146	W2
5	San Diego Chargers	6	3	0	.667	288	221	L1
6	New York Jets	6	3	0	.667	245	166	L1
7	New England Patriots	5	4	0	.556	143	157	W1
8 (Note: Cleveland finished ahead of Buffalo and Buffalo ahead of Seattle based on conference record (4–3 to Buffalo’s 3–3 to Seattle’s 3–5).)	Cleveland Browns	4	5	0	.444	140	182	L1
Did not qualify for the postseason
9	Buffalo Bills	4	5	0	.444	150	154	L3
10	Seattle Seahawks	4	5	0	.444	127	147	W1
11	Kansas City Chiefs	3	6	0	.333	176	184	W1
12	Denver Broncos	2	7	0	.222	148	226	L3
13	Houston Oilers	1	8	0	.111	136	245	L7
14	Baltimore Colts	0	8	1	.056	113	236	L2
Tiebreakers

=== Postseason ===
Round	Date	Opponent (seed)	Result	Venue	Attendance	Game recap
First round	January 8, 1983	Cleveland Browns (8)	W 27–10	Los Angeles Memorial Coliseum	56,555	Recap
Divisional	January 15, 1983	New York Jets (6)	L 14–17	Los Angeles Memorial Coliseum	90,038	Recap
