= Bruce Scholtz =

American football player (born 1958)

No. 58, 51
- Position: Outside Linebacker

Personal information
- Born: September 26, 1958 (age 68); La Grange, Texas, U.S.
- Listed height: 6 ft 6 in (1.98 m)
- Listed weight: 240 lb (109 kg)

Career information
- High school: Crockett (Austin, Texas)
- College: Texas
- NFL draft: 1982: 2nd round, 33rd overall pick

Career history
- Seattle Seahawks (1982–1988); New England Patriots (1989)

Career NFL statistics
- Sacks: 9.5
- Interceptions: 5
- Fumble recoveries: 4
- Stats at Pro Football Reference

Bruce Daniel Scholtz (born September 26, 1958) is an American former professional football player who was a linebacker in the National Football League (NFL) for seven seasons with the Seattle Seahawks and one season with the New England Patriots. He played college football for the Texas Longhorns.

Scholtz attended David Crockett High School in Austin, Texas. During his senior year, he was a captain of the varsity football team and played as both linebacker and center. He won the Central Texas 26AAAA Defensive Player of the Year award. Scholtz also played on the varsity basketball team. He averaged 19 points per game and led the team in rebounding. He graduated from Crockett in 1977 and the University of Texas at Austin where he played in 22 games over two seasons.

At Texas he was a force on defense, and left the school ranked in the top ten in fumbles recovered, tackles for a loss in a season, career tackles for a loss and total tackles.

He was selected in 1982, round 2, pick 6 (33rd overall) by the Seattle Seahawks.
