= 1982 Houston Oilers season =

NFL team season

- Owner: Bud Adams
- General manager: Ladd Herzeg
- Head coach: Ed Biles
- Home stadium: Houston Astrodome

Results
- Record: 1–8
- Conference place: 13th AFC
- Playoffs: Did not qualify
- Pro Bowlers: LB Robert Brazile

The 1982 Houston Oilers season was the franchise’s 23rd overall and the 13th in the National Football League (NFL). After losing their season opener, the Oilers beat the Seattle Seahawks at the Astrodome 23–21. The Oilers were 1–1 before the two-month players’ strike. When the season resumed the Oilers struggled, losing all seven games. Earl Campbell was held to just 536 yards, as the Oilers finished the season with a 1–8 record.

The last remaining active member of the 1982 Houston Oilers was offensive lineman Mike Munchak, who retired after the 1993 season.

== Offseason ==
=== NFL draft ===
1982 Houston Oilers draft
Round	Pick	Player	Position	College	Notes
1	8	Mike Munchak * ^{†}	Guard	Penn State	
2	44	Oliver Luck	Quarterback	West Virginia	
3	72	Stan Edwards	Running back	Michigan	
3	77	Robert Abraham	Linebacker	North Carolina State	
4	94	Steve Bryant	Wide receiver	Purdue	
5	121	Malcolm Taylor	Defensive end	Tennessee State	
6	148	Gary Allen	Running back	Hawaii	
9	234	Matt Bradley	Defensive back	Penn State	
10	261	Ron Reeves	Quarterback	Texas Tech	
11	287	Jim Campbell	Tight end	Kentucky	
12	314	Donnie Craft	Running back	Louisville	
Made roster † Pro Football Hall of Fame * Made at least one Pro Bowl during career

== Personnel ==
=== Staff / Coaches ===
1982 Houston Oilers staff
Front office: Owner/Chairman of the Board/President – Bud Adams; Executive Vice President/General Manager – Ladd Herzeg; Head coaches: Head coach – Ed Biles; Offensive coaches: Offensive coordinator – Jim Shofner; Offensive Backs – Elijah Pitts; Receivers – Andy Bourgeois; Offensive line – Ray Callahan	Defensive coaches: Defensive line – Ralph Staub; Linebackers – Dick Selcer; Defensive Backs – Bob Gambold; Defensive assistant – Ken Houston; Strength and conditioning: Strength and Conditioning – Bill Allerheiligen

=== Roster ===
1982 Houston Oilers roster
Quarterbacks (QB): 8 Archie Manning; 10 Oliver Luck; 14 Gifford Nielsen; Running backs (RB): 31 Gary Allen; 39 Adger Armstrong; 34 Earl Campbell; 40 Donnie Craft; 35 Stan Edwards; 28 Rich Thomaselli; Wide receivers (WR): 80 Harold Bailey; 81 Steve Bryant; 84 Mike Holston; 82 Mike Renfro; 85 Carl Roaches; 83 Tim Smith; Tight ends (TE): 86 Walt Arnold; 87 Dave Casper; 89 Tim Wilson	Offensive linemen (OL): 58 David Carter C; 66 Greg Davidson C; 60 Ed Fisher G; 72 Mark Koncar T; 63 Mike Munchak G; 62 John Schuhmacher T; 76 Morris Towns T; 68 Ralph Williams G; Defensive linemen (DL): 75 Jesse Baker DE; 65 Elvin Bethea DE; 71 Ken Kennard DE; 90 Daryle Skaugstad NT; 67 Mike Stensrud NT; 70 Malcolm Taylor DE	Linebackers (LB): 56 Robert Abraham ILB; 54 Gregg Bingham ILB; 52 Robert Brazile OLB; 50 Daryl Hunt ILB; 53 Avon Riley OLB; 51 Ted Thompson ILB; 59 Ted Washington OLB; Defensive backs (DB): 36 Carter Hartwig SS; 22 Bill Kay CB; 32 Vernon Perry SS; 21 Tate Randle FS; 37 Mike Reinfeldt FS; 27 Greg Stemrick CB; 20 Willie Tullis CB; 33 J. C. Wilson CB; Special teams (ST): 6 John James P; 4 Florian Kempf K	Reserve: 00 Ken Burrough WR (IR); 69 Andy Dorris DE (IR); 64 George Reihner G (IR); Rookies in italics

== Regular season ==
=== Schedule ===
Week	Date	Opponent	Result	Record	Venue	Recap
1	September 12	at **Cincinnati Bengals**	**L** 6–27	0–1	Riverfront Stadium	Recap
2	September 19	Seattle Seahawks	**W** 23–21	1–1	Astrodome	Recap
–	September 26	Buffalo Bills	canceled	1–1	Astrodome	–
–	October 3	at New York Jets	canceled	1–1	Shea Stadium	–
–	October 10	at Kansas City Chiefs	canceled	1–1	Arrowhead Stadium	–
–	October 17	Denver Broncos	canceled	1–1	Astrodome	–
–	October 24	Washington Redskins	canceled	1–1	Astrodome	–
–	October 31	at **Cleveland Browns**	canceled	1–1	Cleveland Municipal Stadium	–
–	November 7	at **Pittsburgh Steelers**	canceled	1–1	Three Rivers Stadium	–
–	November 14	**Cincinnati Bengals**	postponed	1–1	Astrodome	–
3	November 21	**Pittsburgh Steelers**	**L** 10–24	1–2	Astrodome	Recap
4	November 28	at New England Patriots	**L** 21–29	1–3	Schaefer Stadium	Recap
5	December 5	at New York Giants	**L** 14–17	1–4	Giants Stadium	Recap
6	December 13	Dallas Cowboys	**L** 7–37	1–5	Astrodome	Recap
7	December 19	at Philadelphia Eagles	**L** 14–35	1–6	Veterans Stadium	Recap
8	December 26	**Cleveland Browns**	**L** 14–20	1–7	Astrodome	Recap
9	January 2	**Cincinnati Bengals**	**L** 27–35	1–8	Astrodome	Recap
Note: Intra-division opponents are in **bold** text.

=== Standings ===
AFC Central
	W	L	T	PCT	DIV	CONF	PF	PA	STK
Cincinnati Bengals^{(3)}	7	2	0	.778	3–1	6–2	232	177	W2
Pittsburgh Steelers^{(4)}	6	3	0	.667	3–1	5–3	204	146	W2
Cleveland Browns^{(8)}	4	5	0	.444	2–2	4–3	140	182	L1
Houston Oilers	1	8	0	.111	0–4	1–5	136	245	L7

AFC
#	Team	W	L	T	PCT	PF	PA	STK
**Seeded postseason qualifiers**
1	Los Angeles Raiders	8	1	0	.889	260	200	W5
2 (Note: Miami finished ahead of Cincinnati based on better conference record (6–1 to Cincinnati’s 6–2).)	Miami Dolphins	7	2	0	.778	198	131	W3
3	Cincinnati Bengals	7	2	0	.778	232	177	W2
4 (Note: Pittsburgh finished ahead of San Diego based on better record against common opponents (3–1 to Chargers' 2–1). Conference tiebreak was initially used to eliminate New York Jets.) (Note: Pittsburgh and San Diego finished ahead of New York Jets based on conference record (Pittsburgh and San Diego 5–3 against Jets’ 2–3))	Pittsburgh Steelers	6	3	0	.667	204	146	W2
5	San Diego Chargers	6	3	0	.667	288	221	L1
6	New York Jets	6	3	0	.667	245	166	L1
7	New England Patriots	5	4	0	.556	143	157	W1
8 (Note: Cleveland finished ahead of Buffalo and Buffalo ahead of Seattle based on conference record (4–3 to Buffalo’s 3–3 to Seattle’s 3–5).)	Cleveland Browns	4	5	0	.444	140	182	L1
**Did not qualify for the postseason**
9	Buffalo Bills	4	5	0	.444	150	154	L3
10	Seattle Seahawks	4	5	0	.444	127	147	W1
11	Kansas City Chiefs	3	6	0	.333	176	184	W1
12	Denver Broncos	2	7	0	.222	148	226	L3
13	Houston Oilers	1	8	0	.111	136	245	L7
14	Baltimore Colts	0	8	1	.056	113	236	L2
**Tiebreakers**
