= 1982 Seattle Seahawks season =

American football team season

- Owner: The Nordstrom family
- General manager: John Thompson (fired October 13); Mike McCormack (acting)
- Head coach: Jack Patera (fired October 13, 0–2 record); Mike McCormack (interim, 4–3 record)
- Home stadium: Kingdome

Results
- Record: 4–5
- Division place: 10th AFC
- Playoffs: Did not qualify
- All-Pros: None
- Pro Bowlers: SS Kenny Easley

The 1982 Seattle Seahawks season was the team's seventh season with the National Football League (NFL), which was interrupted by a 57-day players strike, which began on September 21, after the second game.

The Seahawks lost their first two games, and three weeks into the strike, head coach Jack Patera and general manager John Thompson were fired on Wednesday, October 13, and Mike McCormack took over as head coach for the remainder of the season.

After the strike ended in November, the Seahawks won twice to even their record at 2–2, then lost a close game to the Los Angeles Raiders. After beating the Chicago Bears the next week, the team was upset 16–0 in the Kingdome by the New England Patriots. Seattle finished at 4–5 and missed the expanded playoffs as the second team out in the tiebreaker.

== Offseason ==
=== 1982 draft class ===
1982 Seattle Seahawks draft
Round	Pick	Player	Position	College	Notes
1	6	Jeff Bryant	Defensive end	Clemson	
2	33	Bruce Scholtz	Linebacker	Texas	
3	75	Pete Metzelaars	Tight end	Wabash	
6	144	Jack Campbell	Offensive tackle	Utah	
7	174	Eugene Williams	Linebacker	Tulsa	
8	201	Chester Cooper	Wide receiver	Minnesota	
9	228	David Jefferson	Linebacker	Miami (FL)	
10	258	Craig Austin	Linebacker	South Dakota	
11	284	Sam Clancy	Defensive end	Pittsburgh	
12	311	Frank Naylor	Center	Rutgers	
Made roster

=== Undrafted free agents ===
1982 undrafted free agents of note
Player	Position	College
Robert Alexander	Safety	Prairie View
Pat Curry	Defensive end	Montana
Brion Demski	Quarterback	Wisconsin–Stevens Point
Jerry Gaillard	Wide receiver	Clemson
Kurt Garl	Linebacker	Humboldt State
Mike Hagen	Fullback	Montana
Norm Johnson	Kicker	UCLA
Tony Jackson	Safety	Michigan
Steve Krainock	Quarterback	Richmond
Bernie Nowotarski	Cornerback	Kutztown State
Jeff Reeves	Safety	Michigan
Grayson Rogers	Quarterback	Pacific
Mike Rustemeyer	Defensive tackle	Rutgers
Andy Shumway	Fullback	Wisconsin–Stevens Point
Sammy Sims	Safety	Nebraska
Jeff Smith	Linebacker	Alcorn State
Scot Tiesing	Tight end	UCLA
Willie Todd	Running back	Central Michigan

== Personnel ==
=== Staff ===
1982 Seattle Seahawks staff
**Front office**: Managing general partner – Elmer Nordstrom; general manager – John Thompson; Assistant general manager – Mark Duncan; Director of football operations – Mike McCormack; Director of player personnel – Dick Mansperger; Director of pro scouting – Chuck Allen; **Head coaches**: Head coach – Jack Patera; **Offensive coaches**: Offensive/quarterbacks/receivers – Jerry Rhome; Offensive backs – Andy MacDonald; Offensive line – Howard Mudd	**Defensive coaches**: Defensive/linebackers – Jackie Simpson; Defensive line – Frank Lauterbur; Defensive backs – Jack Christiansen; **Special teams coaches**: Special teams – Rusty Tillman; **Strength and conditioning**: Head trainer – Bruce Scott; Assistant trainer – Jim Whitesel

=== Final roster ===
1982 Seattle Seahawks roster
**Quarterbacks (QB)**: 12 Sam Adkins; 17 Dave Krieg; **10** Jim Zorn; **Running backs (RB)**: 30 Theotis Brown; **33** Dan Doornink; 46 David Hughes; 37 Eric Lane; **47** Sherman Smith; **Wide receivers (WR)**: 87 Roger Carr; **85** Paul Johns; **80** Steve Largent; 89 Byron Walker; **Tight ends (TE)**: 88 Pete Metzelaars; 81 John Sawyer; **86** Mike Tice	**Offensive linemen (OL)**: **76** Steve August T; **65** Edwin Bailey G; 71 Jack Campbell T; 66 Bill Dugan G; **64** Ron Essink T; 62 Kani Kauahi C/G; 54 Art Kuehn C; 61 Robert Pratt G; **51** John Yarno C; **Defensive linemen (DL)**: 63 Fred Anderson DE; 82 Mark Bell DE/DT; **77** Jeff Bryant DE; 78 David Graham DE; **79** Jacob Green DE; 72 Joe Nash DT; **74** Manu Tuiasosopo DT; 70 Mike White DT	**Linebackers (LB)**: **53** Keith Butler OLB; 50 Brian Flones OLB; **55** Michael Jackson MLB; 57 Shelton Robinson MLB; **58** Bruce Scholtz OLB; 59 Rodell Thomas OLB; 54 Eugene Williams OLB; **Defensive backs (DB)**: **22** Dave Brown CB; 25 Don Dufek SS; **45** Kenny Easley SS; **44** John Harris FS; 27 Gregg Johnson FS; 26 Kerry Justin CB; 48 Ken McAlister SS; **42** Keith Simpson CB; **Special teams (ST)**: 9 Norm Johnson K; 8 Jeff West P	**Reserve**: 68 Dennis Boyd T (IR); 84 Sam Clancy TE (IR); 56 Greg Gaines LB (IR); **75** Robert Hardy DT (IR); 32 Horace Ivory RB (IR); 52 Joe Norman LB (IR); 34 Charles Thomas RB (IR); Rookies in italics 49 active, 7 reserve

- Starters in bold.
- (*) Denotes players that were selected for the 1983 Pro Bowl.

== Schedule ==
=== Preseason ===
Week	Date	Opponent	Result	Record	Venue	Recap
1	August 13	St. Louis Cardinals	**W** 14–0	1–0	Kingdome	Recap
2	August 21	at Minnesota Vikings	**L** 3–7	1–1	Hubert H. Humphrey Metrodome	Recap
3	August 28	at Los Angeles Rams	**L** 13–23	1–2	Anaheim Stadium	Recap
4	September 3	San Francisco 49ers	**L** 13–17	1–3	Kingdome	Recap

Source: Seahawks Media Guides

=== Regular season ===
By finishing in fifth place in 1981, Seattle plays the two NFC fifth-place finishers, the Cardinals and Bears, and two games against the other AFC fifth-place finisher, the Patriots.

Week	Date	Opponent	Result	Record	Venue	Recap
1	September 12	Cleveland Browns	**L** 7–21	0–1	Kingdome	Recap
2	September 19	at Houston Oilers	**L** 21–23	0–2	Astrodome	Recap
3–10	Players' strike					
11	November 21	at **Denver Broncos**	**W** 17–10	1–2	Mile High Stadium	Recap
12	November 28	Pittsburgh Steelers	**W** 16–0	2–2	Kingdome	Recap
13	December 5	at **Los Angeles Raiders**	**L** 23–28	2–3	Los Angeles Memorial Coliseum	Recap
14	December 12	Chicago Bears	**W** 20–14	3–3	Kingdome	Recap
15	December 19	New England Patriots	**L** 0–16	3–4	Kingdome	Recap
16	December 26	at Cincinnati Bengals	**L** 10–24	3–5	Riverfront Stadium	Recap
17	January 2	**Denver Broncos**	**W** 13–11	4–5	Kingdome	Recap
Note: Intra-division opponents are in **bold** text.

Source: 1982 NFL season results

== Standings ==
Playoff teams were determined by the top eight conference teams.

AFC
#	Team	W	L	T	PCT	PF	PA	STK
Seeded postseason qualifiers
1	Los Angeles Raiders	8	1	0	.889	260	200	W5
2 (Note: Miami finished ahead of Cincinnati based on better conference record (6–1 to Cincinnati’s 6–2).)	Miami Dolphins	7	2	0	.778	198	131	W3
3	Cincinnati Bengals	7	2	0	.778	232	177	W2
4 (Note: Pittsburgh finished ahead of San Diego based on better record against common opponents (3–1 to Chargers' 2–1). Conference tiebreak was initially used to eliminate New York Jets.) (Note: Pittsburgh and San Diego finished ahead of New York Jets based on conference record (Pittsburgh and San Diego 5–3 against Jets’ 2–3))	Pittsburgh Steelers	6	3	0	.667	204	146	W2
5	San Diego Chargers	6	3	0	.667	288	221	L1
6	New York Jets	6	3	0	.667	245	166	L1
7	New England Patriots	5	4	0	.556	143	157	W1
8 (Note: Cleveland finished ahead of Buffalo and Buffalo ahead of Seattle based on conference record (4–3 to Buffalo’s 3–3 to Seattle’s 3–5).)	Cleveland Browns	4	5	0	.444	140	182	L1
Did not qualify for the postseason
9	Buffalo Bills	4	5	0	.444	150	154	L3
10	Seattle Seahawks	4	5	0	.444	127	147	W1
11	Kansas City Chiefs	3	6	0	.333	176	184	W1
12	Denver Broncos	2	7	0	.222	148	226	L3
13	Houston Oilers	1	8	0	.111	136	245	L7
14	Baltimore Colts	0	8	1	.056	113	236	L2
Tiebreakers

AFC West
	W	L	T	PCT	DIV	CONF	PF	PA	STK
^{(1)} Los Angeles Raiders	8	1	0	.889	5–0	5–1	260	200	W5
^{(5)} San Diego Chargers	6	3	0	.667	2–3	5–3	288	221	L1
Seattle Seahawks	4	5	0	.444	2–1	3–5	127	147	W1
Kansas City Chiefs	3	6	0	.333	2–1	3–3	176	184	W1
Denver Broncos	2	7	0	.222	0–6	0–6	148	226	L3

== Game summaries ==
=== Preseason ===
==== Week P1: vs. St. Louis Cardinals ====
Preseason Week One: Seattle Seahawks vs. St. Louis Cardinals – Game summary

Quarter	1	2	3	4	Total
Cardinals	0	0	0	0	0
Seahawks	7	7	0	0	14

at Kingdome, Seattle, Washington

- Date: August 13
- Game time: 7:30 pm local
- Game weather: indoors
- Game attendance: 55,525
- Referee: Fred Silva
- Gamebook

==== Week P2: at Minnesota Vikings ====
Preseason Week Two: Seattle Seahawks at Minnesota Vikings – Game summary

Quarter	1	2	3	4	Total
Seahawks	3	0	0	0	3
Vikings	0	0	7	0	7

at Metrodome, Minneapolis, Minnesota

- Date: August 21
- Game time: 7:30 pm local
- Game weather: indoors
- Game attendance: 57,880
- Referee: Jerry Seeman
- TV: KING
- Gamebook

==== Week P3: at Los Angeles Rams ====
Preseason Week Three: Seattle Seahawks at Los Angeles Rams – Game summary

Quarter	1	2	3	4	Total
Seahawks	0	0	7	6	13
Rams	7	6	3	7	23

at Anaheim Stadium, Anaheim, California

- Date: August 28
- Game time: 7:00 pm local
- Game weather: clear, 74 °F (23 °C), 75% humidity, wind E 11 miles per hour (18 km/h)
- Game attendance: 54,537
- Referee: Fred Wyant
- TV: KING
- Gamebook

==== Week P4: vs. San Francisco 49ers ====
Preseason Week Four: Seattle Seahawks vs. San Francisco 49ers – Game summary

Quarter	1	2	3	4	Total
49ers	3	14	0	0	17
Seahawks	0	0	6	7	13

at Kingdome, Seattle, Washington

- Date: September 3
- Game time: 7:35 pm local
- Game weather: indoors
- Game attendance: 57,839
- Referee: Gene Barth
- Gamebook

=== Regular season ===
==== Week 1: vs. Cleveland Browns ====
Week One: Seattle Seahawks vs. Cleveland Browns – Game summary

Quarter	1	2	3	4	Total
Browns	7	14	0	0	21
Seahawks	0	0	7	0	7

at Kingdome, Seattle, Washington

- Date: September 12
- Game time: 1:02 pm local
- Game weather: indoors
- Game attendance: 55,907
- Referee: Bob Frederic
- TV announcers (NBC): Phil Stone and Gene Washington
- Gamebook

Game information

First quarter

- CLE – Mike Pruitt 3-yard run (Matt Bahr kick), 4:09 (CLE 7–0)

Second quarter

- CLE – Charles White 18-yard run (Matt Bahr kick), 14:49 (CLE 14–0)
- CLE – Mike Pruitt 2-yard run (Matt Bahr kick), 4:36 (CLE 21–0)

Third quarter

- SEA – Horace Ivory 5-yard run (Norm Johnson kick), 1:30 (CLE 21–7)

Fourth quarter

- No scoring plays

Top passers

- CLE – Brian Sipe: 11/23, 138 yds
- SEA – Dave Krieg: 22/38, 203 yds, 1 INT

Top rushers

- CLE – Mike Pruitt: 30 car, 136 yds, 2 TD
- SEA – Dan Doornink: 5 car, 14 yds

Top receivers

- CLE – Charles White: 5 rec, 66 yds
- SEA – Steve Largent: 6 rec, 71 yds

Team – pass – rush – total – to

- CLE – 130 – 200 – 330 – 1
- SEA – 140 – 40 – 180 – 3

==== Week 2: at Houston Oilers ====
Week Two: Seattle Seahawks at Houston Oilers – Game summary

Quarter	1	2	3	4	Total
Seahawks	0	7	0	14	21
Oilers	0	7	10	6	23

at Astrodome, Houston, Texas

- Date: September 19
- Game time: 3:00 pm local
- Game weather: indoors
- Game attendance: 43,117
- Referee: Tom Dooley
- TV announcers (NBC): Phil Stone and Gene Washington
- Gamebook

Game information

First quarter

- No scoring plays

Second quarter

- HOU – Dave Casper 19-yard pass from Gifford Nielsen (Florian Kempf kick), 1:17 (HOU 7–0)
- SEA – Byron Walker 40-yard pass from Dave Krieg (Norm Johnson kick), 0:19 (Tied 7–7)

Third quarter

- HOU – Florian Kempf 24-yard field goal, 10:48 (HOU 10–7)
- HOU – Mike Reinfeldt fumble recovered in end zone (Norm Johnson kick), 7:11 (HOU 17–7)

Fourth quarter

- SEA – Theotis Brown 3-yard run (Norm Johnson kick), 7:00 (HOU 17–14)
- SEA – David Hughes 29-yard pass from Jim Zorn (Norm Johnson kick), 5:42 (SEA 21–17)
- HOU – Earl Campbell 12-yard run (PAT failed), 0:53 (HOU 23–21)

Top passers

- SEA – Dave Krieg: 15/22, 156 yds, 1 TD
- HOU – Gifford Nielsen: 17/37, 131 yds, 1 TD, 1 INT

Top rushers

- SEA – Theotis Brown: 5 car, 31 yds, 1 TD
- HOU – Earl Campbell: 30 car, 142 yds, 1 TD

Top receivers

- SEA – Byron Walker: 4 rec, 81 yds, 1 TD
- HOU – Donnie Craft: 6 rec, 62 yds

Team – pass – rush – total – to

- SEA – 223 – 80 – 303 – 3
- HOU – 112 – 170 – 282 – 3

==== Week 11: at Denver Broncos ====
Week Eleven: Seattle Seahawks at Denver Broncos – Game summary

Quarter	1	2	3	4	Total
Seahawks	0	0	7	10	17
Broncos	0	7	3	0	10

at Mile High Stadium, Denver, Colorado

- Date: November 21
- Game time: 2:00 pm local
- Game weather: clear, 48 °F (9 °C), 30% humidity, wind E 15 miles per hour (24 km/h)
- Game attendance: 73,996
- Referee: Jerry Seeman
- TV announcers (NBC): Charlie Jones and Len Dawson
- Gamebook

Game information

First quarter

- No scoring plays

Second quarter

- DEN – Gerald Willhite 15-yard run (Rich Karlis kick), 7:13 (DEN 7–0)

Third quarter

- SEA – Bruce Scholtz 31-yard interception return (Norm Johnson kick), 10:45 (Tied 7–7)
- DEN – Rich Karlis 21-yard field goal, 5:38 (DEN 10–7)

Fourth quarter

- SEA – Norm Johnson 25-yard field goal, 5:36 (Tied 10–10)
- SEA – Steve Largent 34-yard pass from Jim Zorn (Norm Johnson kick), 0:49 (SEA 17–10)

Top passers

- SEA – Jim Zorn: 22/41, 318 yds, 1 TD, 1 INT
- DEN – Steve DeBerg: 12/25, 129 yds, 2 INT

Top rushers

- SEA – Sherman Smith: 11 car, 56 yds
- DEN – Gerald Willhite: 9 car, 70 yds, 1 TD

Top receivers

- SEA – Paul Johns: 5 rec, 103 yds
- DEN – Steve Watson: 3 rec, 47 yds

Team – pass – rush – total – to

- SEA – 303 – 84 – 387 – 1
- DEN – 114 – 136 – 250 – 2

==== Week 12: vs. Pittsburgh Steelers ====
Week Twelve: Seattle Seahawks vs. Pittsburgh Steelers – Game summary

Quarter	1	2	3	4	Total
Steelers	0	0	0	0	0
Seahawks	3	6	7	0	16

at Kingdome, Seattle, Washington

- Date: November 28
- Game time: 1:01 pm local
- Game weather: indoors
- Game attendance: 55,553
- Referee: Fred Silva
- TV announcers (NBC): Charlie Jones and Len Dawson
- Gamebook

Game information

First quarter

- SEA – Norm Johnson 35-yard field goal, 2:24 (SEA 3–0)

Second quarter

- SEA – Norm Johnson 48-yard field goal, 1:54 (SEA 6–0)
- SEA – Norm Johnson 29-yard field goal, 0:02 (SEA 9–0)

Third quarter

- SEA – Paul Johns 11-yard pass from Jim Zorn (Norm Johnson kick), 0:43 (SEA 16–0)

Fourth quarter

- No scoring plays

Top passers

- PIT – Cliff Stoudt: 9/20, 73 yds, 3 INT
- SEA – Jim Zorn: 14/22, 204 yds, 1 TD

Top rushers

- PIT – Franco Harris: 6 car, 33 yds
- SEA – Sherman Smith: 17 car, 59 yds

Top receivers

- PIT – John Stallworth: 4 rec, 59 yds
- SEA – Steve Largent: 5 rec, 109 yds

Team – pass – rush – total – to

- PIT – 135 – 83 – 218 – 5
- SEA – 166 – 124 – 290 – 1

==== Week 13: at Los Angeles Raiders ====
Week Thirteen: Seattle Seahawks at Los Angeles Raiders – Game summary

Quarter	1	2	3	4	Total
Seahawks	0	7	0	16	23
Raiders	7	21	0	0	28

at Los Angeles Memorial Coliseum, Los Angeles, California

- Date: December 5
- Game time: 1:01 pm local
- Game weather: hazy, 75 °F (24 °C), 75% humidity, wind N 10 miles per hour (16 km/h)
- Game attendance: 42,170
- Referee: Gordon McCarter
- TV announcers (NBC): Phil Stone and Gene Washington
- Gamebook

Game information

First quarter

- LA – Marcus Allen 2-yard run (Chris Bahr kick), 3:32 (LA 7–0)

Second quarter

- LA – Kenny King 1-yard run (Chris Bahr kick), 14:12 (LA 14–0)
- LA – Rod Martin 39-yard interception return (Chris Bahr kick), 13:09 (LA 21–0)
- LA – Marcus Allen 3-yard run (Chris Bahr kick), 7:18 (LA 28–0)
- SEA – Steve Largent 10-yard pass from Jim Zorn (Norm Johnson kick), 1:11 (LA 28–7)

Third quarter

- No scoring plays

Fourth quarter

- SEA – Theotis Brown 3-yard run (PAT failed), 12:08 (LA 28–13)
- SEA – Roger Carr 23-yard pass from Jim Zorn (Norm Johnson kick), 9:15 (LA 28–20)
- SEA – Norm Johnson 30-yard field goal, 4:51 (LA 28–23)

Top passers

- SEA – Jim Zorn: 16/45, 280 yds, 2 TD, 3 INT
- LA – Jim Plunkett: 10/19, 82 yds, 1 INT

Top rushers

- SEA – Jim Zorn: 1 car, 35 yds
- LA – Marcus Allen: 24 car, 156 yds, 2 TD

Top receivers

- SEA – Roger Carr: 3 rec, 90 yds, 1 TD
- LA – Todd Christensen: 5 rec, 53 yds

Team – pass – rush – total – to

- SEA – 251 – 80 – 331 – 4
- LA – 41 – 194 – 235 – 1

==== Week 14: vs. Chicago Bears ====
Week Fourteen: Seattle Seahawks vs. Chicago Bears – Game summary

Quarter	1	2	3	4	Total
Bears	7	0	0	7	14
Seahawks	3	14	0	3	20

at Kingdome, Seattle, Washington

- Date: December 12
- Game time: 1:02 pm local
- Game weather: indoors
- Game attendance: 52,826
- Referee: Gene Barth
- TV announcers (CBS): Tim Ryan and Johnny Morris
- Gamebook

Game information

First quarter

- SEA – Norm Johnson 30-yard field goal, 9:57 (SEA 3–0)
- CHI – Brian Baschnagel 39-yard pass from Walter Payton (John Roveto kick), 1:26 (CHI 7–3)

Second quarter

- SEA – Jim Zorn 15-yard run (Norm Johnson kick), 10:45 (SEA 10–7)
- SEA – Byron Walker 7-yard pass from Jim Zorn (Norm Johnson kick), 1:56 (SEA 17–7)

Third quarter

- No scoring plays

Fourth quarter

- CHI – Matt Suhey 2-yard run (John Roveto kick), 11:53 (SEA 17–14)
- SEA – Norm Johnson 34-yard field goal, 1:57 (SEA 20–14)

Top passers

- CHI – Jim McMahon: 19/29, 199 yds, 1 INT
- SEA – Jim Zorn: 22/32, 196 yds, 1 TD

Top rushers

- CHI – Walter Payton: 14 car, 40 yds
- SEA – Jim Zorn: 4 car, 41 yds, 1 TD

Top receivers

- CHI – Brian Baschnagel: 4 rec, 89 yds, 1 TD
- SEA – Steve Largent: 8 rec, 111 yds

Team – pass – rush – total – to

- CHI – 213 – 97 – 310 – 2
- SEA – 164 – 126 – 290 – 0

==== Week 15: vs. New England Patriots ====
Week Fifteen: Seattle Seahawks vs. New England Patriots – Game summary

Quarter	1	2	3	4	Total
Patriots	3	7	3	3	16
Seahawks	0	0	0	0	0

at Kingdome, Seattle, Washington

- Date: December 19
- Game time: 1:01 pm local
- Game weather: indoors
- Game attendance: 53,457
- Referee: Dick Jorgensen
- TV announcers (NBC): Jay Randolph and Gene Washington
- Gamebook

Game information

First quarter

- NE – John Smith 21-yard field goal, 0:04 (NE 3–0)

Second quarter

- NE – Mark van Eeghen 5-yard pass from Steve Grogan (John Smith kick), 0:09 (NE 10–0)

Third quarter

- NE – John Smith 37-yard field goal, 8:41 (NE 13–0)

Fourth quarter

- NE – John Smith 23-yard field goal, 3:05 (NE 16–0)

Top passers

- NE – Steve Grogan: 14/20, 157 yds, 1 TD
- SEA – Jim Zorn: 15/35, 134 yds, 4 INT

Top rushers

- NE – Tony Collins: 32 car, 103 yds
- SEA – Dan Doornink: 5 car, 20 yds

Top receivers

- NE – Morris Bradshaw: 3 rec, 78 yds
- SEA – Sherman Smith: 4 rec, 47 yds

Team – pass – rush – total – to

- NE – 144 – 249 – 393 – 1
- SEA – 118 – 53 – 171 – 6

==== Week 16: at Cincinnati Bengals ====
Week Sixteen: Seattle Seahawks at Cincinnati Bengals – Game summary

Quarter	1	2	3	4	Total
Seahawks	0	3	7	0	10
Bengals	0	14	0	10	24

at Riverfront Stadium, Cincinnati, Ohio

- Date: December 26
- Game time: 1:00 pm local
- Game weather: showers, 43 °F (6 °C), 79% humidity, wind N 10 miles per hour (16 km/h)
- Game attendance: 55,330
- Referee: Bob Frederic
- TV announcers (NBC): Jay Randolph and Bob Griese
- Gamebook

Game information

First quarter

- No scoring plays

Second quarter

- CIN – Pete Johnson 1-yard run (Jim Breech kick), 13:09 (CIN 7–0)
- SEA – Norm Johnson 43-yard field goal, 4:50 (CIN 7–3)
- CIN – David Verser 56-yard pass from Ken Anderson (Jim Breech kick), 2:13 (CIN 14–3)

Third quarter

- SEA – Steve Largent 2-yard pass from Jim Zorn (Norm Johnson kick), 2:19 (CIN 14–10)

Fourth quarter

- CIN – Jim Breech 34-yard field goal, 10:30 (CIN 17–10)
- CIN – Pete Johnson 3-yard run (Jim Breech kick), 7:46 (CIN 24–10)

Top passers

- SEA – Jim Zorn: 19/35, 217 yds, 1 TD, 2 INT
- CIN – Ken Anderson: 22/29, 265 yds, 1 TD, 2 INT

Top rushers

- SEA – Dan Doornink: 10 car, 34 yds
- CIN – Pete Johnson: 17 car, 69 yds, 2 TD

Top receivers

- SEA – Roger Carr: 4 rec, 81 yds
- CIN – David Verser: 2 rec, 63 yds, 1 TD

Team – pass – rush – total – to

- SEA –200 – 79 – 279 – 3
- CIN – 256 – 133 – 389 – 3

==== Week 17: vs. Denver Broncos ====
Week Seventeen: Seattle Seahawks vs. Denver Broncos – Game summary

Quarter	1	2	3	4	Total
Broncos	2	0	7	2	11
Seahawks	3	0	0	10	13

at Kingdome, Seattle, Washington

- Date: January 2
- Game time: 1:00 pm local
- Game weather: indoors
- Game attendance: 43,145
- Referee: Fred Wyant
- TV announcers (NBC): Phil Stone and Gene Washington
- Gamebook

Game information

First quarter

- SEA – Norm Johnson 22-yard field goal, 8:09 (SEA 3–0)
- DEN – Safety, Greg Boyd tackled Theotis Brown in end zone, 0:01 (SEA 3–2)

Second quarter

- No scoring plays

Third quarter

- DEN – Mark Herrmann 6-yard run (Fred Steinfort kick), 3:46 (DEN 9–3)

Fourth quarter

- SEA – Norm Johnson 34-yard field goal, 10:57 (DEN 9–6)
- DEN – Safety, Barney Chavous tackled Dave Krieg in end zone, 3:44 (DEN 11–6)
- SEA – Steve Largent 19-yard pass from Dave Krieg (Norm Johnson kick), 0:47 (SEA 13–11)

Top passers

- DEN – Mark Herrmann: 18/32, 188 yds, 1 INT
- SEA – Dave Krieg: 12/18, 142 yds, 1 TD, 1 INT

Top rushers

- DEN – Sammy Winder: 13 car, 67 yds
- SEA – Dan Doornink: 10 car, 70 yds

Top receivers

- DEN – James Wright: 3 rec, 64 yds
- SEA – Dan Doornink: 5 rec, 67 yds

Team – pass – rush – total – to

- DEN – 188 – 199 – 387 – 4
- SEA – 234 – 129 – 363 – 3
