= 1982 NFL season =

American football season

Regular season
- Duration: September 12, 1982 – January 3, 1983
- A player's strike shortened the regular season to 9 games.

Playoffs
- Start date: January 8, 1983
- AFC Champions: Miami Dolphins
- NFC Champions: Washington Redskins

Super Bowl XVII
- Date: January 30, 1983
- Site: Rose Bowl, Pasadena, California
- Champions: Washington Redskins

Pro Bowl
- Date: February 6, 1983
- Site: Aloha Stadium

AFC teams: West, Central, East
NFC teams: West, Central, East

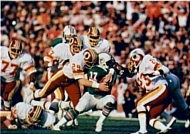
The Redskins playing against the Dolphins in Super Bowl XVII.

The 1982 NFL season was the 63rd regular season of the National Football League. A 57-day-long players' strike reduced the 1982 season from a 16-game schedule per team to an abbreviated nine-game schedule. Because of the shortened season, the NFL adopted a special 16-team playoff tournament; division standings were ignored for seeding (although each division sent at least two teams, except the NFC West which had only one). Eight teams from each conference were seeded 1–8 based on their regular season records. Two teams qualified for the playoffs despite losing records (the Cleveland Browns and the Detroit Lions). The season ended with Super Bowl XVII when the Washington Redskins defeated the Miami Dolphins 27–17 at the Rose Bowl.

Before the season, a verdict was handed down against the league in the trial brought by the Oakland Raiders and the Los Angeles Memorial Coliseum back in 1980. The jury ruled that the NFL violated antitrust laws when it declined to approve the proposed move by the team from Oakland to Los Angeles. Thus, the league was forced to let the officially renamed "Los Angeles Raiders" play in the second largest city in the United States, returning football to the Los Angeles area proper following a two-year absence (the Los Angeles Rams left the Coliseum for Anaheim Stadium in Orange County in 1980).

For the start of the 1982 season, the Minnesota Vikings moved from Metropolitan Stadium to the Hubert H. Humphrey Metrodome.

== Player movement ==
=== Transactions ===
- August 25, 1982: Quarterback Ken Stabler, winner of Super Bowl XI with the Oakland Raiders, signed with the New Orleans Saints.

=== Traded ===
September 18, 1982: The New Orleans Saints traded longtime starter Archie Manning to the Houston Oilers for offensive tackle Leon Gray.

=== Retirements ===
- February 10, 1982: Four-time Super Bowl champion Mean Joe Greene announces his retirement.

=== Draft ===
The 1982 NFL draft was held from April 27 to 28, 1982, at New York City's Sheraton Hotel. With the first pick, the New England Patriots selected defensive end Kenneth Sims from the University of Texas. And with the second pick, the Baltimore Colts selected Johnie Cooks from Mississippi State.

== Major rule changes ==
- The penalty for incidental grabbing of a facemask that is committed by the defensive team changed from five yards and an automatic first down to only five yards with no automatic first down. The incidental facemask penalty was eliminated for the 2008 season.
- The penalties for illegally kicking, batting, or punching the ball changed from 15 yards to 10 yards.
- This was the first season that the NFL recorded quarterback sacks as an official statistic.

== Regular season ==
=== New Sunday time slots ===
For the first time all Sunday afternoon games began in one of two windows: 1:00 p.m. ET/noon CT for early games, or 4:00 p.m. ET/1:00 p.m. PT for late games. From 1970 to 1981, most games began at 1 p.m. local time regardless of the home team (except in Denver, where the Broncos kick off at 2 p.m. MT). An exception to this rule was made for the Baltimore Colts, who were forced to begin Sunday home games no earlier than 2 p.m. Eastern due to a Baltimore ordinance, since repealed, which prohibited Sunday sporting events from beginning prior to that hour. That ordinance was cited by owner Robert Irsay as a burden and a factor in moving the franchise to Indianapolis in March 1984.

=== 1982 players' strike ===
Players began a 57-day strike following the completion of week 2 of the regular season. As a result of the impasse, games were simply cancelled until a settlement was reached (ultimately, Weeks 3 to 10).

During the players strike, the NFLPA put on two exhibition games. One game was played at RFK Stadium in Washington DC and the other was at the Los Angeles Memorial Coliseum. Low attendance and court rulings forced the NFLPA to cancel any further games.

Upon reaching that settlement, the NFL announced that Weeks 11 to 16 would be played as scheduled, and the games originally scheduled for week 3 of the season would be played following the completion of the resumed regular season as a new week 17, with the playoffs pushed back one week. Later, the NFL decided to use the final week 17 to hold various intra-division games from cancelled Weeks 3 to 10 instead of merely playing the week-3 games. This was done to increase attendance and to allow some teams to balance out home and away games, to the extent possible (either five home and four away, or four home and five away). Because the 1982 shortened season would include only nine regular season contests for each team, the NFL announced that the three divisions in each of the two conferences would be eliminated for the purpose of determining playoff qualifications, and the regular season would be followed by an expansion of the playoffs from 10 to 16 teams. With this, each conference had 14 teams competing for 8 playoff spots, with division standings being disregarded in favor of overall conference standings. The Washington Redskins were the Super Bowl winners.

== Final standings ==
AFC
#	Team	W	L	T	PCT	PF	PA	STK
Seeded postseason qualifiers
1	Los Angeles Raiders	8	1	0	.889	260	200	W5
2 (Note: Miami finished ahead of Cincinnati based on better conference record (6–1 to Cincinnati’s 6–2).)	Miami Dolphins	7	2	0	.778	198	131	W3
3	Cincinnati Bengals	7	2	0	.778	232	177	W2
4 (Note: Pittsburgh finished ahead of San Diego based on better record against common opponents (3–1 to Chargers' 2–1). Conference tiebreak was initially used to eliminate New York Jets.) (Note: Pittsburgh and San Diego finished ahead of New York Jets based on conference record (Pittsburgh and San Diego 5–3 against Jets’ 2–3))	Pittsburgh Steelers	6	3	0	.667	204	146	W2
5	San Diego Chargers	6	3	0	.667	288	221	L1
6	New York Jets	6	3	0	.667	245	166	L1
7	New England Patriots	5	4	0	.556	143	157	W1
8 (Note: Cleveland finished ahead of Buffalo and Buffalo ahead of Seattle based on conference record (4–3 to Buffalo’s 3–3 to Seattle’s 3–5).)	Cleveland Browns	4	5	0	.444	140	182	L1
Did not qualify for the postseason
9	Buffalo Bills	4	5	0	.444	150	154	L3
10	Seattle Seahawks	4	5	0	.444	127	147	W1
11	Kansas City Chiefs	3	6	0	.333	176	184	W1
12	Denver Broncos	2	7	0	.222	148	226	L3
13	Houston Oilers	1	8	0	.111	136	245	L7
14	Baltimore Colts	0	8	1	.056	113	236	L2
Tiebreakers

NFC
#	Team	W	L	T	PCT	PF	PA	STK
Seeded postseason qualifiers
1	Washington Redskins	8	1	0	.889	190	128	W4
2	Dallas Cowboys	6	3	0	.667	226	145	L2
3	Green Bay Packers	5	3	1	.611	226	169	L1
4 (Note: Minnesota (4–1), Atlanta (4–3), St. Louis (5–4), Tampa Bay (3–3) seeds were determined by best won-lost record in conference games.)	Minnesota Vikings	5	4	0	.556	187	198	W1
5	Atlanta Falcons	5	4	0	.556	183	199	L2
6	St. Louis Cardinals	5	4	0	.556	135	170	L1
7	Tampa Bay Buccaneers	5	4	0	.556	158	178	W3
8 (Note: Detroit finished ahead of New Orleans and the N.Y. Giants based on best conference record (4–4 to Saints’ 3–5 to Giants’ 3–5).)	Detroit Lions	4	5	0	.444	181	176	W1
Did not qualify for the postseason
9	New Orleans Saints	4	5	0	.444	129	160	W1
10	New York Giants	4	5	0	.444	164	160	W1
11 (Note: San Francisco finished ahead of Chicago, and Chicago finished ahead of Philadelphia, based on conference record (49ers’ 2–3 to Bears’ 2–5 to Eagles’ 1–5).)	San Francisco 49ers	3	6	0	.333	209	206	L1
12	Chicago Bears	3	6	0	.333	141	174	L1
13	Philadelphia Eagles	3	6	0	.333	191	195	L1
14	Los Angeles Rams	2	7	0	.222	200	250	W1
Tiebreakers

Clinched playoff seeds are marked in parentheses and shaded in green

== Playoffs ==
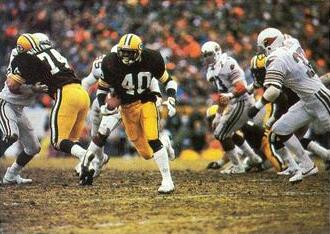
The Packers playing against the Cardinals in the 1982 NFC First Round Playoff game.

Each of the first three rounds of the playoffs was pushed back one week in order to make room for the new week 17, which was originally scheduled as the Wild Card weekend. This was possible because there was an idle week between the Conference Championship games and the Super Bowl. The Super Bowl was held as originally scheduled.

=== Bracket ===
Jan 9 – Riverfront Stadium
6	NY Jets	44	Jan 15 – Los Angeles Memorial Coliseum
3	Cincinnati	17
Jan 8 – Los Angeles Memorial Coliseum	6	NY Jets	17
1	LA Raiders	14
8	Cleveland	10	AFC	Jan 23 – Miami Orange Bowl
1	LA Raiders	27
Jan 9 – Three Rivers Stadium	6	NY Jets	0
2	Miami	14
5	San Diego	31	Jan 16 – Miami Orange Bowl	AFC Championship
4	Pittsburgh	28
Jan 8 – Miami Orange Bowl	5	San Diego	13
2	Miami	34
7	New England	13
2	Miami	28	Jan 30 – Rose Bowl
First Round playoffs	Second Round playoffs	A2	Miami	17
N1	Washington	27
Jan 8 – Lambeau Field	Super Bowl XVII
6	St. Louis	16	Jan 16 – Texas Stadium
3	Green Bay	41
Jan 9 – Texas Stadium	3	Green Bay	26
2	Dallas	37
7	Tampa Bay	17	NFC
Jan 22 – RFK Stadium
2	Dallas	30
Jan 9 – Hubert H. Humphrey Metrodome	2	Dallas	17
1	Washington	31
5	Atlanta	24	Jan 15 – RFK Stadium	NFC Championship
4	Minnesota	30
Jan 8 – RFK Stadium	4	Minnesota	7
1	Washington	21
8	Detroit	7
1	Washington	31

Until this season, no team ever reached the post-season with a losing record. The Cleveland Browns and Detroit Lions both made playoff appearances with 4–5 records. It would be 28 years before another team with a losing record would make the postseason (however, this would be accomplished in a full season).

The postseason would mark several "firsts" and "lasts" for several teams and players:

- This was the Cardinals' first postseason appearance since 1975 and last postseason game representing St. Louis. The franchise relocated to Arizona in 1988 and did not return to the playoffs until 1998. The Cardinals were 0–3 in playoff games representing St. Louis, with all three on the road.
- This marked Terry Bradshaw's final appearance at Three Rivers Stadium. He sat out nearly all of the 1983 season with an elbow injury, appearing in just one half of a late-season game against the Jets in what turned out to be their final game at Shea Stadium. It would also be the final appearance of fellow Hall of Famers Lynn Swann and Jack Ham, both of whom would retire in the offseason, the last home playoff game of head coach Chuck Noll (who would coach eight more years, with the Steelers either missing the playoffs or only playing away playoff games), and the Steelers last home playoff game until 1992.
- This was Tampa Bay's last playoff game until 1997, by which time the Buccaneers replaced their orange uniforms. From 1983 to 1996, they suffered 14 consecutive losing seasons, 13 of which saw Tampa Bay lose 10 or more games.
- This would be Atlanta's last playoff appearance until the 1991 season.
- This was the final postseason appearance in the Hall of Fame careers of Chargers stars Dan Fouts, Charlie Joiner, and Kellen Winslow. All would remain with the Chargers until at least 1986, but the Chargers would not return to the postseason until 1992.
- This was the Packers' first postseason appearance since 1972 and only the second since Vince Lombardi stepped down as head coach following the 1967 season, as well as the team's only postseason victory between the Lombardi and Brett Favre eras (1969–91). The Packers would not play another postseason game until 1993.
- This would be the final playoff win in Cowboys coach Tom Landry's career before his firing in 1989. It would be the Cowboys last playoff victory until 1991. After appearing in 10 of the previous 13 NFC Championship games, this would be Dallas's last appearance until 1992.

== Awards ==
Most Valuable Player	Mark Moseley, Placekicker, Washington
Coach of the Year	Joe Gibbs, Washington
Offensive Player of the Year	Dan Fouts, quarterback, San Diego
Defensive Player of the Year	Lawrence Taylor, linebacker, NY Giants
Offensive Rookie of the Year	Marcus Allen, running back, LA Raiders
Defensive Rookie of the Year	Chip Banks, linebacker, Cleveland
Man of the Year	Joe Theismann, quarterback, Washington
Comeback Player of the Year	Lyle Alzado, defensive end, LA Raiders
Super Bowl Most Valuable Player	John Riggins, running back, Washington

== Coaching changes ==
=== Offseason ===
- Baltimore Colts: Frank Kush replaced the fired Mike McCormack.
- Chicago Bears: Mike Ditka replaced the fired Neill Armstrong.
- New England Patriots: Ron Meyer replaced the fired Ron Erhardt.

=== In-season ===
- Seattle Seahawks: Jack Patera was fired during the players strike after the team lost their first two games. Mike McCormack, the team's director of football operations, took over as interim for the remainder of the season.

== Stadium changes ==
- The relocated Los Angeles Raiders moved from the Oakland–Alameda County Coliseum to the Los Angeles Memorial Coliseum
- The Minnesota Vikings moved from Metropolitan Stadium in Bloomington to the Metrodome in Minneapolis

== Uniform changes ==
- The league discontinued the 1979 numbering system for officials, with officials numbered separately by position, and reverted to the original system where each NFL official was assigned a random number regardless of position. Officials who were in the league in 1978 were allowed to reclaim their old number or switch to a number used by a 1978 official who had since retired or was not in use in 1978; officials hired beginning in 1979 then picked from remaining numbers based upon seniority. Also the officials' position was now abbreviated on the back of the uniform instead of being spelled out in full.
- The Baltimore Colts began wearing gray pants with their blue jerseys. The gray pants featured a horseshoe on each hip, with the player's number inside the horseshoe.
- The Chicago Bears switched from gray to navy blue face masks.
- The Detroit Lions switched from silver to white numbers on their blue jerseys.
- The Dallas Cowboys added elliptical blue circles with the player's number to the hip area of the pants.
- The St. Louis Cardinals repeated their helmet logo on top of the sleeve stripes of their white jerseys.
- The Washington Redskins modified their helmet logo. The feathers hanging from the side of the Redskin portrait were now curved ("tucked under" the portrait) instead of hanging straight. The Redskins reverted to their previous logo, adopted in 1972, the next season.

== Television ==
ABC, CBS, and NBC each signed five-year contracts to renew their rights to broadcast Monday Night Football, the NFC package, and the AFC package, respectively. The major change was that ABC was allowed into the Super Bowl rotation beginning with Super Bowl XIX at the end of the 1984 season.

Len Berman replaced Bryant Gumbel as host on NBC's pregame show NFL '82. Pete Axthelm also joined the show as a studio analyst.

With games canceled during the players' strike, CBS sent Pat Summerall and John Madden, and some of their other regular NFL announcing crews, to instead call a few college football Division II and III games. NBC acquired the rights to air the Canadian Football League for those weeks, sending Dick Enberg and Merlin Olsen, and their other regular NFL announcing crews to those games.

During this season, the new Channel 4 in the United Kingdom began its coverage of the NFL which was to earn a substantial following during English soccer's low point of the mid-1980s. However, the first game shown—between the Dallas Cowboys and the Pittsburgh Steelers—had been played some time before it was shown in the UK, because coverage began during the players' strike.

== Deaths ==
=== October ===
- October 26 – Vince Jacob, age 51. Official since 1975 (line judge 1975–77; side judge 1978 – first two weeks of 1982).

=== December ===
- December 11 – Rich Houston, age 37. Drafted in the 4th round of the 1969 National Football League draft, Houston played for the New York Giants 1969–1973.
