= 1982 Cleveland Browns season =

NFL team season

- Owner: Art Modell
- Head coach: Sam Rutigliano
- Offensive coordinator: Larrye Weaver
- Defensive coordinator: Marty Schottenheimer
- Home stadium: Cleveland Municipal Stadium

Results
- Record: 4–5
- Division place: 8th AFC (Would have been 3rd in the AFC Central)
- Playoffs: Lost Wild Card Playoffs (at Raiders) 10–27
- Pro Bowlers: LB Chip Banks

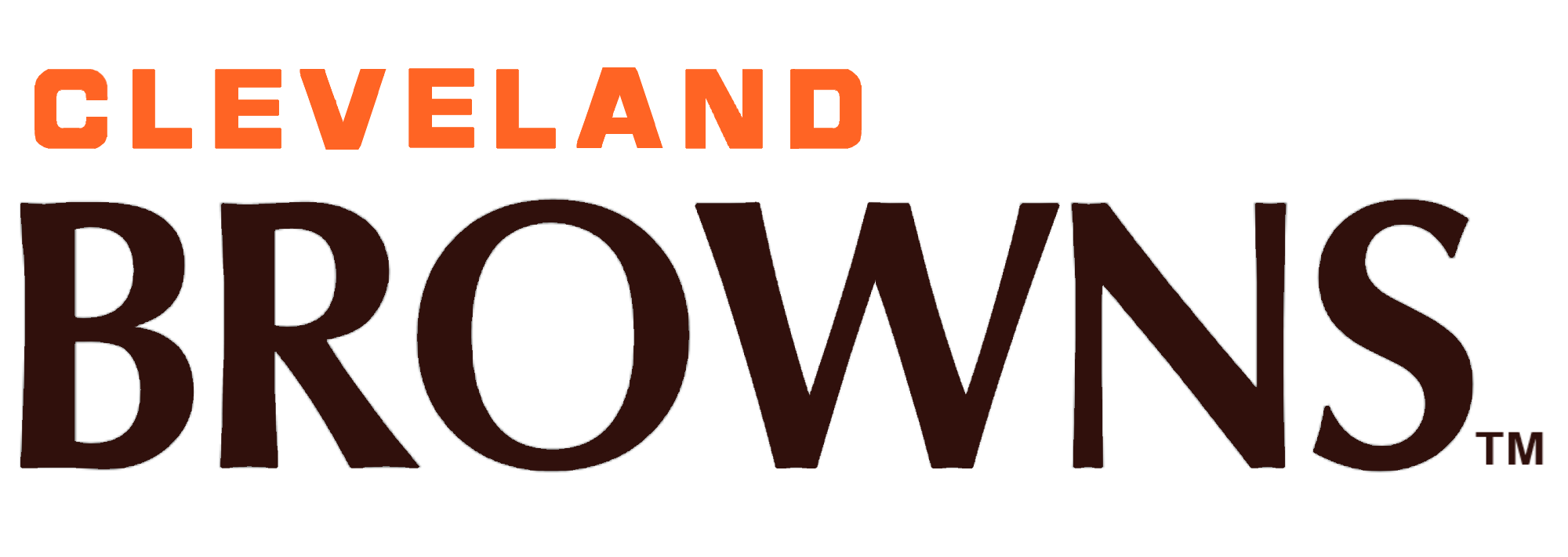
1975-1995 Browns Script

The 1982 Cleveland Browns season was the team's 33rd season with the National Football League.

The Browns were among eight teams that qualified for the playoffs during this strike shortened season, and became one of only six teams to ever qualify for the playoffs despite having a losing record. The Browns and the Detroit Lions from the same year are the only two teams with a losing record to qualify as wildcards. In the first round of the NFL playoffs, Cleveland lost to the Los Angeles Raiders 27–10.

The Browns' first round draft pick, rookie sensation linebacker Chip Banks earned 6.5 sacks in just nine games.

== NFL draft ==
The following were selected in the 1982 NFL draft.

1982 Cleveland Browns draft
| Round | Selection | Player | Position | College | Notes |
|---|---|---|---|---|---|
| 1 | 3 | Chip Banks | Linebacker | USC | |
| 2 | 31 | Keith Baldwin | Defensive end | Texas A&M | |
| 4 | 87 | Dwight Walker | Running back | Nicholls State | |
| 5 | 115 | Mike Baab | Center | Texas | |
| 6 | 162 | Mike Whitwell | Defensive back | Texas A&M | |
| 8 | 199 | Mark Kafentzis | Defensive back | Hawaii | |
| 8 | 204 | Van Heflin | Tight end | Vanderbilt | |
| 8 | 211 | Bill Jackson | Defensive back | North Carolina | |
| 9 | 227 | Milton Baker | Tight end | West Texas A&M | |
| 10 | 255 | Ricky Floyd | Running back | Southern Miss | |
| 11 | 282 | Steve Michuta | Quarterback | Grand Valley State | |
| 12 | 310 | Scott Nicolas | Linebacker | Miami | |

== Personnel ==
=== Staff / Coaches ===
1982 Cleveland Browns staff
| Front office: President and owner – Art Modell; Assistant to the president – Peter Hadhazy; Head coaches: Head coach – Sam Rutigliano; Offensive coaches: Quarterbacks – Paul Hackett; Running backs – Jim Garrett; Receivers – Rich Kotite; Offensive line – Rod Humenuik | Defensive coaches: Defensive coordinator – Marty Schottenheimer; Defensive line – Tom Pratt; Linebackers – Dave Adolph; Defensive Backs - Len Fontes; Special teams coaches: Special teams – John Petercuskie; Special Assistant - Darvin Wallis; Strength and conditioning: Strength and conditioning – Dave Redding; Director of Pro Personnel - Allan Webb; Film Coordinator - Ed Ulinski; Athletic Trainer - Leo Murphy |

=== Roster ===
1982 Cleveland Browns roster
| Quarterbacks: 12 Rick Trocano; 16 Paul McDonald; 17 Brian Sipe; Running backs: 25 Charles White; 26 Dino Hall; 30 Cleo Miller; 34 David Green; 38 Johnny Davis; 42 Dwight Walker; 43 Mike Pruitt; Wide receivers: 80 Willis Adams (IR); 81 Mike Whitwell; 83 Ricky Feacher; 85 Dave Logan; 86 Danny Fulton; Tight ends: 82 Ozzie Newsome; 84 McDonald Oden | Offensive linemen: 54 Tom DeLeone C; 61 Mike Baab C; 63 Cody Risien T; 64 Joe DeLamielleure G; 68 Robert Jackson G; 70 Andy Frederick T; 71 Matt Miller T/G; 73 Doug Dieken T; Defensive linemen: 79 Bob Golic NT; 90 Marshall Harris DE; 91 Henry Bradley NT; 92 Mike Robinson DE; 94 Elvis Franks DE; 99 Keith Baldwin DE | Linebackers: 50 Tom Cousineau ILB; 51 Eddie Johnson ILB; 52 Dick Ambrose ILB; 53 Bill Cowher OLB; 55 Curtis Weathers OLB; 56 Chip Banks OLB; 57 Clay Matthews OLB; 58 Scott Nicolas ILB; 59 Kevin Turner ILB; Defensive backs: 20 Judson Flint CB/S; 22 Clarence Scott FS; 23 Mark Kafentzis FS; 28 Ron Bolton CB; 29 Hanford Dixon CB; 36 Bill Jackson SS; 47 Larry Braziel CB; 48 Lawrence Johnson CB (IR); 49 Clinton Burrell SS; Special teams: 9 Matt Bahr K; 15 Steve Cox P; rookies in italics |

== Schedule ==
| Week | Date | Opponent | Result | Record | Venue | Attendance |
|---|---|---|---|---|---|---|
| 1 | September 12 | at Seattle Seahawks | **W** 21–7 | 1–0 | Kingdome | 55,907 |
| 2 | September 19 | Philadelphia Eagles | **L** 21–24 | 1–1 | Cleveland Municipal Stadium | 78,830 |
| September 27 | | Cincinnati Bengals | canceled | | Cleveland Municipal Stadium | |
| October 3 | | at Washington Redskins | canceled | | RFK Stadium | |
| October 10 | | at Los Angeles Raiders | canceled | | Los Angeles Memorial Coliseum | |
| October 17 | | Baltimore Colts | canceled | | Cleveland Municipal Stadium | |
| October 24 | | at **Pittsburgh Steelers** | postponed | | Three Rivers Stadium | |
| October 31 | | Houston Oilers | canceled | | Cleveland Municipal Stadium | |
| November 7 | | New York Giants | canceled | | Cleveland Municipal Stadium | |
| November 14 | | at Miami Dolphins | canceled | | Miami Orange Bowl | |
| 3 | November 21 | New England Patriots | **W** 10–7 | 2–1 | Cleveland Municipal Stadium | 51,781 |
| 4 | November 25 | at Dallas Cowboys | **L** 14–31 | 2–2 | Texas Stadium | 46,267 |
| 5 | December 5 | San Diego Chargers | **L** 13–30 | 2–3 | Cleveland Municipal Stadium | 54,064 |
| 6 | December 12 | at **Cincinnati Bengals** | **L** 10–23 | 2–4 | Riverfront Stadium | 54,305 |
| 7 | December 19 | **Pittsburgh Steelers** | **W** 10–9 | 3–4 | Cleveland Municipal Stadium | 67,139 |
| 8 | December 26 | at **Houston Oilers** | **W** 20–14 | 4–4 | Houston Astrodome | 36,559 |
| 9 | January 2 | at **Pittsburgh Steelers** | **L** 21–37 | 4–5 | Three Rivers Stadium | 52,312 |
Note: Intra-division opponents are in **bold** text.

== Season highlights ==
=== Week 1 at Seattle ===
Less than nine months after closing the 1981 season in Seattle, the Browns return to the Kingdome and defeat the Seahawks 21–7. Mike Pruitt accounts for 136 of Cleveland's 200 rushing yards and scores two touchdowns. The Browns sack Dave Krieg eight teams, three by rookie linebacker Chip Banks.

=== Week 3 vs. New England ===
In their first game after the 1982 NFL strike that wiped out almost half the regular season, The Browns fight their way through a heavy Cleveland fog and beat New England, 10–7, on Matt Bahr's 24-yard field goal as time expires. Bahr's winner comes three plays after Browns safety Clinton Burrell recovers a fumble by Mark van Eeghen at the Patriots' 20.

=== Week 5 vs. San Diego ===
James Brooks scores two touchdowns and Dan Fouts completes 18-of-23 passes as San Diego pounds the Browns 30–13, at Cleveland. Despite the loss, Brian Sipe completes 14 straight passes and stretches his overall streak to a club-record 33. He also surpasses the 20,000-yard career mark. Tight end Ozzie Newsome catches a career-high 10 passes and extends his streak of consecutive games with at least one reception to a club-record 45.

=== Week 7 vs. Pittsburgh ===
Hanford Dixon intercepts three passes and the Browns keep their playoff hopes alive with a 10–9 win over Pittsburgh at rainy, muddy Cleveland Stadium. The poor conditions affect Steelers quarterback Terry Bradshaw more than Paul McDonald, who starts his first game in place of the slumping Sipe. Nose tackle Bob Golic enjoys a big game with eight tackles and one sack.

=== Week 8 at Houston ===
The Browns escape with a 20–14 win, thanks to critical fumbles by running back Earl Campbell. The first comes at the Cleveland 4 and the second sets up the Browns' winning touchdown in the fourth quarter. Dave Logan scores one TD on a 56-yard pass from McDonald and Charles White scores the winner on a 1-yard run.

== Postseason ==
| Round | Date | Opponent (seed) | Result | Record | Venue | Attendance | Recap |
|---|---|---|---|---|---|---|---|
| Wild Card | January 8, 1983 | at Los Angeles Raiders (1) | L 10–27 | 0–1 | Los Angeles Memorial Coliseum | 56,555 | Recap |

=== Standings ===
AFC Central
| | W | L | T | PCT | DIV | CONF | PF | PA | STK |
|---|---|---|---|---|---|---|---|---|---|
| ^{(3)} Cincinnati Bengals | 7 | 2 | 0 | .778 | 3–1 | 6–2 | 232 | 177 | W2 |
| ^{(4)} Pittsburgh Steelers | 6 | 3 | 0 | .667 | 3–1 | 5–3 | 204 | 146 | W2 |
| ^{(8)} Cleveland Browns | 4 | 5 | 0 | .444 | 2–2 | 4–3 | 140 | 182 | L1 |
| Houston Oilers | 1 | 8 | 0 | .111 | 0–4 | 1–5 | 136 | 245 | L7 |

AFC
| # | Team | W | L | T | PCT | PF | PA | STK |
|---|---|---|---|---|---|---|---|---|
Seeded postseason qualifiers
| 1 | Los Angeles Raiders | 8 | 1 | 0 | .889 | 260 | 200 | W5 |
| 2 (Note: Miami finished ahead of Cincinnati based on better conference record (6–1 to Cincinnati’s 6–2).) | Miami Dolphins | 7 | 2 | 0 | .778 | 198 | 131 | W3 |
| 3 | Cincinnati Bengals | 7 | 2 | 0 | .778 | 232 | 177 | W2 |
| 4 (Note: Pittsburgh finished ahead of San Diego based on better record against common opponents (3–1 to Chargers' 2–1). Conference tiebreak was initially used to eliminate New York Jets.) (Note: Pittsburgh and San Diego finished ahead of New York Jets based on conference record (Pittsburgh and San Diego 5–3 against Jets’ 2–3)) | Pittsburgh Steelers | 6 | 3 | 0 | .667 | 204 | 146 | W2 |
| 5 | San Diego Chargers | 6 | 3 | 0 | .667 | 288 | 221 | L1 |
| 6 | New York Jets | 6 | 3 | 0 | .667 | 245 | 166 | L1 |
| 7 | New England Patriots | 5 | 4 | 0 | .556 | 143 | 157 | W1 |
| 8 (Note: Cleveland finished ahead of Buffalo and Buffalo ahead of Seattle based on conference record (4–3 to Buffalo’s 3–3 to Seattle’s 3–5).) | Cleveland Browns | 4 | 5 | 0 | .444 | 140 | 182 | L1 |
Did not qualify for the postseason
| 9 | Buffalo Bills | 4 | 5 | 0 | .444 | 150 | 154 | L3 |
| 10 | Seattle Seahawks | 4 | 5 | 0 | .444 | 127 | 147 | W1 |
| 11 | Kansas City Chiefs | 3 | 6 | 0 | .333 | 176 | 184 | W1 |
| 12 | Denver Broncos | 2 | 7 | 0 | .222 | 148 | 226 | L3 |
| 13 | Houston Oilers | 1 | 8 | 0 | .111 | 136 | 245 | L7 |
| 14 | Baltimore Colts | 0 | 8 | 1 | .056 | 113 | 236 | L2 |
Tiebreakers
