= James Davis (cornerback) =

American football player (born 1957)

No. 45
- Position: Cornerback

Personal information
- Born: June 12, 1957 (age 69); Los Angeles, California, U.S.
- Listed height: 6 ft 0 in (1.83 m)
- Listed weight: 193 lb (88 kg)

Career information
- High school: Crenshaw (CA)
- College: Southern
- NFL draft: 1981: 5th round, 111th overall pick

Career history
- Los Angeles Raiders (1982–1987)

Awards and highlights
- Super Bowl champion (XVIII)

Career NFL statistics
- Interceptions: 4
- Sacks: 1
- Fumble recoveries: 5
- Stats at Pro Football Reference

James Steven Davis (born June 12, 1957) is an American former professional football player who was a cornerback in the National Football League (NFL).

Davis was born in Los Angeles, California and attended Crenshaw High School. He played college football at Southern University in Baton Rouge, Louisiana.

Davis was selected by the Oakland Raiders in the fifth round of the 1981 NFL draft. He spent six seasons with the team, from 1982 to 1987, and was a member of the Super Bowl XVIII championship team.
