= 1987 Dallas Cowboys season =

NFL team season

- Owner: Bum Bright
- General manager: Tex Schramm
- Head coach: Tom Landry
- Home stadium: Texas Stadium

Results
- Record: 7–8
- Division place: 2nd NFC East
- Playoffs: Did not qualify

The 1987 Dallas Cowboys season was the franchise's 28th season in the National Football League, they improved the record to 7–8 from 1986 but missing the playoffs for the second consecutive season.

== Offseason ==
=== NFL draft ===
1987 Dallas Cowboys draft
Round	Pick	Player	Position	College	Notes
1	12	Danny Noonan	DT	Nebraska	
2	39	Ron Francis	CB	Baylor	
3	68	Jeff Zimmerman	OG	Florida	
4	95	Kelvin Martin	WR	Boston College	
5	124	Everett Gay	WR	Texas	
6	151	Joe Onosai	C	Hawaii	
7	180	Kevin Sweeney	QB	Fresno State	
8	206	Kevin Gogan *	OG	Washington	
9	234	Alvin Blount	RB	Maryland	
10	262	Dale Jones	LB	Tennessee	
11	291	Jeff Ward	PK	Texas	
12	318	Scott Armstrong	LB	Florida	
Made roster † Pro Football Hall of Fame * Made at least one Pro Bowl during career

=== Undrafted free agents ===
1987 undrafted free agents of note
Player	Position	College
Rich Borresen	Tight end	Northwestern
Anthony Coleman	Safety	Baylor
Kelvin Farmer	Running back	Toledo
James Flowers	Defensive back	Texas A&M
Jeff Hurd	Linebacker	Kansas State
Herbert Johnson	Wide receiver	Missouri
Michael Kee	Linebacker	Ohio State
Ron Keller	Kicker	New Mexico
Steve Kidd	Punter	Rice
Darryl Lee	Defensive end	Ohio State
Scott Linehan	Quarterback	Idaho
Lorenzo Lynch	Cornerback	Sacramento State
Ray Perkins	Defensive end	Virginia
Brent Peterson	Tight end	Missouri
Marty Peterson	Offensive line	Penn
Antonio Rice	Running back	Virginia
John Shaffer	Quarterback	Penn State
Victor Simmons	Linebacker	Central State
Loren Snyder	Quarterback	Northern Colorado
Scott Urch	Offensive Tackle	Virginia
Crang Wallis	Quarterback	Chico State
Mike Zentic	Center	Oklahoma State

== Summary ==
The NFL players were unable to reach a contract agreement with the owners, as a result, a strike for the second time in six seasons after the second week of games. Unlike the last strike, the owners replaced the striking players with free agents and veteran players who were willing to cross the picket line. The NFL cancelled all games for the week of September 27 and began playing with the replacement players on October 4. The strike ended on October 15, but the replacement players played the next weekend as well. The replacement players participated in three weeks worth of games overall.

After the Cowboys began the season with a 24–13 loss to St. Louis with an upset over the defending Super Bowl champion New York Giants, the majority of the Cowboys players went on strike. Players that crossed the picket line to play with the replacement players included quarterback Danny White, defensive tackle Randy White, running back Tony Dorsett, and defensive end Ed Jones. Thanks to the veteran players and a few replacement players who would stay on with the team after the strike, the Cowboys fielded one of the better replacement teams.

The replacement Cowboys easily defeated the New York Jets and Philadelphia Eagles, with the Eagles game being of particular note. The Eagles fielded a team completely made up of replacements, and were no match for the Cowboys, who played several of their veterans throughout the game. Eagles head coach Buddy Ryan was displeased with head coach Tom Landry for doing this and afterwards made it clear that he was looking forward to playing the Cowboys in two weeks when the non-replacement Eagles returned. The following week the Cowboys missed an opportunity to take command in the NFC East when they suffered a devastating loss to the Washington Redskins. Despite playing Danny White and Tony Dorsett the entire game against a Redskins team fielded entirely of replacement players, the Cowboys came up short 13–7.

The striking players returned the following week and on October 25, even though the Philadelphia Eagles were already assured of winning against the Cowboys 30–20, they attempted to go for a touchdown with 35 seconds left in the game. Eagles head coach Buddy Ryan wasn't happy about the strike game they lost to Dallas, when Randy White and Ed “Too Tall” Jones were still playing at the end of the game. In the rematch, the Eagles took a kneel down to run down the clock, putting the ball at the Dallas 34 yard line with 10 seconds left. On the next play, quarterback Randall Cunningham faked taking another kneel down and threw a pass to the end zone that drew a pass-interference penalty, placing the ball on the one-yard line, from where running back Keith Byars scored with 2 seconds left for a final result of 37-20. Dallas came out of the strike with a 3-2 record, but lost 4 straight games in November and December to fall out of playoff contention.

The Cowboys were up and down the rest of the season, following another victory over the Giants with a loss to the woeful Detroit Lions. The Cowboys squandered a 5–4 record down the stretch with a 4-game losing streak, sandwiching heartbreaking losses to the Vikings and Redskins with an embarrassing home loss to the Falcons. After the Falcons game, Cowboys owner Bum Bright questioned coach Landry's play-calling, and Cowboys team president Tex Schramm said of the loss, "this is probably the lowest I've been in my career." The Cowboys rebounded in the last two games, however, defeating the Los Angeles Rams and the St. Louis Cardinals, and eliminating both from the playoffs in the process.

Running back Herschel Walker had another terrific season, leading the Cowboys in rushing and receiving, and leading the NFL in yards from scrimmage with 1606, while former star running back Tony Dorsett posted career lows in rushing yards with 456. Quarterback Danny White struggled with turnovers throughout the season, and was replaced by Steve Pelleur late in the season. The Cowboys offensive line had trouble with pass protection again, allowing 52 sacks, while the receiving corps was mediocre, with Mike Renfro leading the way with 662 yards on 46 catches. Defensively, the Cowboys really struggled against the pass, finishing 27th in passing yards allowed, despite posting 51 sacks and 23 interceptions. The Cowboys were solid against the run, finishing 6th overall and only allowing 3.5 yards a carry.

== NFL replacement players ==
After the league decided to use replacement players during the strike, besides hiring a new team (referred by the media as "Rhinestone Cowboys"), Dallas forced veterans like Randy White, Ed "Too Tall" Jones, Danny White and Tony Dorsett, to cross the picket line to avoid losing their contract annuities (delayed payments).

This strategy backfired, as there have been several interviews with former players mentioning that this caused a rift inside the team that lasted for years, and that it was one of the main reasons for the franchise's decline during the Eighties decade.

1987 Dallas Cowboys replacement roster
Quarterbacks: 19 Kevin Sweeney (3 games); 11 Danny White (3 games); 18 Loren Snyder (3 games); 7 Stan Yagiello (1 game); 17 Ben Bennett (1 game); Running backs: 28 Alvin Blount RB (3 games); 33 Tony Dorsett RB (3 games); 21 David Adams RB/KR (3 games); 37 Gerald White FB (3 games); 39 E. J. Jones FB (3 games); 29 Robert Lavette RB (2 games); 25 Antonio Rice FB (1 game); Wide receivers: 87 Kelvin Edwards WR (3 games); 89 Cornell Burbage WR/PR (3 games); 82 Mike Renfro WR (3 games); 80 Sebron Spivey WR/KR (3 games); 47 Chuck Scott WR (3 games); 44 Vince Courville WR (3 games); 86 Lam Jones WR (3 games); 83 Terence Steward WR (2 games); 81 Karl Powe WR (2 games); 82 Clay Pickering WR (1 game); Tight ends: 84 Rich Borresen TE (3 games); 85 Tim Hendrix TE (3 games)	Offensive linemen: 75 Daryle Smith T (3 games); 70 Bob White G (3 games); 62 Mike Zentic C (3 games); 79 Sal Cesario G (3 games); 77 Steve Cisowski T (3 games); 73 Dave Burnette T (3 games); 67 Gary Walker G (2 games); 63 Jon Shields G (3 games); 65 Gary Westberry T (3 games); 64 George Lilja C (1 game); 61 Nate Newton G (1 game); Defensive linemen: 54 Randy White DT (3 games); 72 Ed Jones DE (3 games); 60 Don Smerek DE (3 games); 71 Mike Dwyer DT (3 games); 94 Randy Watts DE (3 games); 92 Ray Perkins DE (3 games); 91 Walt Johnson DT (3 games); 93 Javan Ross DE (3 games); 99 Kevin Brooks DT (2 games); 90 Darryl Lee DT (1 game)	Linebackers: 51 Dale Jones OLB (3 games); 57 Russ Swan MLB (3 games); 58 Jeff Hurd OLB (3 games); 52 Chris Duliban OLB (3 games); 53 Victor Simmons MLB (3 games); 55 Harry Flaherty OLB (3 games); 59 Kirk Timmer OLB (1 game); Defensive backs: 23 Robert Williams CB (3 games); 27 Tommy Haynes S (3 games); 48 Alex Green S (3 games); 35 Jimmy Armstrong CB (2 games); 20 Bruce Livingston CB/PR (3 games); 31 Bill Hill CB (3 games); 41 Anthony Coleman S (3 games); Special teams: 8 Buzz Sawyer P (3 games); 9 Luis Zendejas K (2 games); 4 Kerry Brady K (1 game); 3 Tom Dixon P/K (1 game)

== Roster ==
1987 Dallas Cowboys final roster
Quarterbacks: 14 Paul McDonald; 16 Steve Pelluer; 19 Kevin Sweeney; 11 Danny White; Running backs: 42 Darryl Clack; 33 Tony Dorsett; 46 Todd Fowler; 30 Timmy Newsome; 34 Herschel Walker; Wide receivers: 80 Rod Barksdale; 81 Kelvin Edwards; 83 Kelvin Martin; 82 Mike Renfro; Tight ends: 89 Thornton Chandler; 88 Doug Cosbie; 85 Steve Folsom	Offensive linemen: 62 Brian Baldinger G/T; 66 Kevin Gogan T; 68 Crawford Ker G; 67 George Lilja C; 61 Nate Newton G; 64 Tom Rafferty C; 75 Daryle Smith T; 70 Bob White C/G; 76 Jeff Zimmerman G; Defensive linemen: 99 Kevin Brooks DT; 77 Jim Jeffcoat DE; 72 Ed Jones DE; 73 Danny Noonan DT/DE; 60 Don Smerek DE; 95 Mark Walen DE/DT; 54 Randy White DT	Linebackers: 57 Ron Burton MLB; 55 Steve DeOssie MLB; 52 Jeff Hurd OLB; 59 Jesse Penn OLB; 50 Jeff Rohrer OLB; 51 Russ Swan MLB; Defensive backs: 36 Vince Albritton SS; 40 Bill Bates SS; 26 Michael Downs FS; 38 Ron Francis CB; 45 Manny Hendrix CB; 22 Victor Scott FS; 24 Everson Walls CB; 23 Robert Williams CB; Special teams: 9 Roger Ruzek K; 4 Mike Saxon P	Reserve lists: 2 Ray Alexander WR (IR); 87 Gordon Banks WR (IR); -- Everett Gay WR (IR); 58 Mike Hegman LB (IR); 53 Garth Jax LB (IR); 56 Eugene Lockhart LB (IR); 65 Kurt Petersen G (IR); 75 Phil Pozderac T/retired; 89 Brian Salonen LB (IR); 86 Mike Sherrard WR (IR); 97 Robert Smith DE (IR); 63 Glen Titensor G (IR); 71 Mark Tuinei T (IR); Rookies in italics

== Schedule ==
Weeks 4-6 were played with Replacement players

Week	Date	Opponent	Result	Record	Game Site	Attendance	Recap
1	September 13	at **St. Louis Cardinals**	**L** 13–24	0–1	Busch Stadium	47,241	Recap
2	September 20	at **New York Giants**	**W** 16–14	1–1	Giants Stadium	73,426	Recap
3	September 27	Buffalo Bills	Canceled - Players' Strike				
4	October 4	at New York Jets	**W** 38–24	2–1	Giants Stadium	12,370	Recap
5	October 11	**Philadelphia Eagles**	**W** 41–22	3–1	Texas Stadium	40,622	Recap
6	October 19	**Washington Redskins**	**L** 7–13	3–2	Texas Stadium	60,415	Recap
7	October 25	at **Philadelphia Eagles**	**L** 20–37	3–3	Veterans Stadium	61,630	Recap
8	November 2	**New York Giants**	**W** 33–24	4–3	Texas Stadium	55,730	Recap
9	November 8	at Detroit Lions	**L** 17–27	4–4	Pontiac Silverdome	45,325	Recap
10	November 15	at New England Patriots	**W** 23–17 (OT)	5–4	Sullivan Stadium	60,567	Recap
11	November 22	Miami Dolphins	**L** 14–20	5–5	Texas Stadium	56,519	Recap
12	November 26	Minnesota Vikings	**L** 38–44 (OT)	5–6	Texas Stadium	54,229	Recap
13	December 6	Atlanta Falcons	**L** 10–21	5–7	Texas Stadium	40,103	Recap
14	December 13	at **Washington Redskins**	**L** 20–24	5–8	RFK Stadium	54,882	Recap
15	December 21	at Los Angeles Rams	**W** 29–21	6–8	Anaheim Stadium	60,700	Recap
16	December 27	**St. Louis Cardinals**	**W** 21–16	7–8	Texas Stadium	36,788	Recap

Division opponents are in bold text

== Standings ==
NFC East
	W	L	T	PCT	DIV	CONF	PF	PA	STK
^{(3)} Washington Redskins	11	4	0	.733	7–1	9–3	379	285	W1
Dallas Cowboys	7	8	0	.467	4–4	5–7	340	348	W2
St. Louis Cardinals	7	8	0	.467	3–5	7–7	362	368	L1
Philadelphia Eagles	7	8	0	.467	3–5	4–7	337	380	W2
New York Giants	6	9	0	.400	3–5	4–8	280	312	W2
