= Gary Walker (American football center) =

German-American football player (born 1963)

No. 67
- Position: Center

Personal information
- Born: December 15, 1963 (age 62); Haßfurt, Germany
- Listed height: 6 ft 3 in (1.91 m)
- Listed weight: 283 lb (128 kg)

Career information
- High school: Portsmouth (New Hampshire)
- College: Boston University
- NFL draft: 1986: 5th round, 124th overall pick

Career history
- Indianapolis Colts (1986)*; Dallas Cowboys (1987)
- * Offseason or practice squad member only

Career NFL statistics
- Games played: 1
- Stats at Pro Football Reference

Gary Wayne Walker (born December 15, 1963) is a German-born American former football center. He played college football at Boston University. He was drafted in the fifth round (124th overall) of the 1986 NFL draft by the Indianapolis Colts.

He also played for the Dallas Cowboys of the National Football League (NFL) appearing in one game in 1987.
