= American Bowl =

Football competition

The American Bowl was a series of National Football League preseason exhibition games that were held at sites outside the United States between 1986 and 2005.

The league started the American Bowl series in 1986 primarily to promote American football in other countries. After successful games in London's Wembley Stadium, the series was expanded to Japan. After 1990, games were also played in Montreal and Berlin to promote the new World League of American Football (later NFL Europe) which started in 1991.

== Game history ==
=== Previous games outside the U.S. ===
Several earlier pre-season games involved NFL teams and were played outside the United States, without being labeled "American Bowl" games. Between 1950 and 1983, there were 13 football games involving NFL or AFL teams played on foreign soil. Six games in Canada between 1950–1961 pitted NFL teams against CFL teams with the NFL team winning all six games. These games were a hybrid of US and Canadian football. One game involved an AFL team (the Buffalo Bills, who lost 38–21 to the CFL's Hamilton Tiger-Cats).

The NFL and CFL also arranged games in each other's country as part of what NFL commissioner Pete Rozelle called "harmonious relations" between the leagues. In 1960, the New York Giants scheduled exhibitions in Montreal and Toronto in response to a 1958 CFL matchup in Philadelphia; the Montreal game was subsequently canceled due to scheduling conflicts with the Montreal Alouettes, who opposed it as an "invasion" of their city.

Five games also used the American Bowl format without the name prior to 1986. One of these games was an AFL–NFL matchup, Boston vs. Detroit on August 25, 1969. Firstly, two games were played in Montreal in 1969. Then NFL exhibition games took place in Tokyo (1976), Mexico City (1978), and London (1983) before the term American Bowl was coined. The game in Tokyo was called the "Mainichi Star Bowl" to reflect its sponsors Mainichi Shimbun and Sports Nippon. The game in London was called the "Global Cup".

=== American Bowl games (1986–2005) ===
At least one American Bowl game was played annually between 1986 and 2003. As many as four were played per year in the early 1990s. The two participating teams were selected by the league. The American Bowl was a fifth pre-season game, played the same weekend as the Pro Football Hall of Fame Game, and did not take away a game from the participating teams' pre-season schedules.

The largest crowd in NFL history was recorded at the American Bowl game at Mexico City on August 15, 1994, when 112,376 people attended the Governor's Cup game between the Dallas Cowboys and Houston Oilers.

In 1996 it was played in Monterrey at the Estadio Universitario. The 1997 game was played in Dublin, Ireland, as well as Toronto (Buffalo and Green Bay).

There were three games in 1998, two in 2000, and thereafter one per year. There was no American Bowl game played in 2004, and from 2000 to 2005 all American Bowl games were played in either Mexico or Japan.

Two 1988 games in Montreal and Gothenburg, Sweden, and a 1993 game in Toronto, are not classed as American Bowl games. This is because they were not arranged by the NFL but, rather, the scheduled home team elected to play there. Montreal held an American Bowl in 1990. At the time Montreal had no CFL team, after the Concordes/Alouettes had folded in 1987, but before the new Alouettes relocated there in 1996. The NFL-backed World League saw the Montreal Machine franchise compete in 1991 and 1992.

=== Post–American Bowl ===
The last American Bowl was held in 2005. After taking over the position in 2006, new NFL commissioner Roger Goodell cited the league's new international strategy in the abandonment of international pre-season games as well as the closure of what had by then become NFL Europa after its 2007 season, instead focusing on playing regular season games in foreign countries.

The pre-season game that was scheduled to take place in August 2007 (later postponed to 2009) between the New England Patriots and the Seattle Seahawks at Beijing National Stadium in Beijing, China, was named the China Bowl instead of the American Bowl; that game, too, was eventually canceled before being played.

The first regular season NFL game played outside the United States was held on October 2, 2005, at Estadio Azteca in Mexico City before an NFL regular-season record of 103,467 fans. The Arizona Cardinals defeated the San Francisco 49ers, 31–14. The New York Giants and Miami Dolphins played a regular season game at the newly rebuilt Wembley Stadium in London on October 28, 2007 (with the Giants winning 13–10), the first ever NFL regular season game to be played outside of North America; similarly, the San Diego Chargers and New Orleans Saints followed suit in October 2008. These games are termed the NFL International Series. In addition to these games, the Buffalo Bills began the Bills Toronto Series, a number of annual pre- and regular-season games in Toronto; the Miami Dolphins beat the Bills 16–3 in the first such game on December 7, 2008. The series ran from 2008 to 2013.

== List of games ==
Date	Winning team	Score	Losing team	Score	Stadium	City
August 3, 1986	Chicago Bears	17	Dallas Cowboys	6	Wembley Stadium	(United Kingdom) London
August 9, 1987	Los Angeles Rams	28	Denver Broncos	27	Wembley Stadium	(United Kingdom) London
July 31, 1988	Miami Dolphins	27	San Francisco 49ers	21	Wembley Stadium	(United Kingdom) London
August 6, 1989	Los Angeles Rams	16	San Francisco 49ers	13	Tokyo Dome	(Japan) Tokyo
August 6, 1989	Philadelphia Eagles	17	Cleveland Browns	13	Wembley Stadium	(United Kingdom) London
August 5, 1990	Denver Broncos	10	Seattle Seahawks	7	Tokyo Dome	(Japan) Tokyo
August 5, 1990	New Orleans Saints	17	Los Angeles Raiders	10	Wembley Stadium	(United Kingdom) London
August 9, 1990	Pittsburgh Steelers	30	New England Patriots	14	Olympic Stadium	(Canada) Montreal
August 11, 1990	Los Angeles Rams	19	Kansas City Chiefs	3	Olympiastadion	(West Germany) West Berlin
July 28, 1991	Buffalo Bills	17	Philadelphia Eagles	13	Wembley Stadium	(United Kingdom) London
August 3, 1991	San Francisco 49ers	21	Chicago Bears	7	Olympiastadion	(Germany) Berlin
August 4, 1991	Miami Dolphins	19	Los Angeles Raiders	17	Tokyo Dome	(Japan) Tokyo
August 2, 1992	Houston Oilers	34	Dallas Cowboys	23	Tokyo Dome	(Japan) Tokyo
August 15, 1992	Miami Dolphins	31	Denver Broncos	27	Olympiastadion	(Germany) Berlin
August 16, 1992	San Francisco 49ers	17	Washington Redskins	15	Wembley Stadium	(United Kingdom) London
August 1, 1993	New Orleans Saints	28	Philadelphia Eagles	16	Tokyo Dome	(Japan) Tokyo
August 1, 1993	San Francisco 49ers	21	Pittsburgh Steelers	14	Estadi Olímpic	(Spain) Barcelona
August 7, 1993	Minnesota Vikings	20	Buffalo Bills	6	Olympiastadion	(Germany) Berlin
August 8, 1993	Dallas Cowboys	13	Detroit Lions	13	Wembley Stadium	(United Kingdom) London
July 31, 1994	Los Angeles Raiders	25	Denver Broncos	22	Estadi Olímpic	(Spain) Barcelona
August 7, 1994	Minnesota Vikings	17	Kansas City Chiefs	9	Tokyo Dome	(Japan) Tokyo
August 13, 1994	New York Giants	28	San Diego Chargers	20	Olympiastadion	(Germany) Berlin
August 15, 1994	Houston Oilers	6	Dallas Cowboys	0	Estadio Azteca	Mexico City
August 6, 1995	Denver Broncos	24	San Francisco 49ers	10	Tokyo Dome	(Japan) Tokyo
August 12, 1995	Buffalo Bills	9	Dallas Cowboys	7	SkyDome	(Canada) Toronto
July 28, 1996	San Diego Chargers	20	Pittsburgh Steelers	10	Tokyo Dome	(Japan) Tokyo
August 5, 1996	Kansas City Chiefs	32	Dallas Cowboys	6	Estadio Universitario	(Mexico) Monterrey
July 27, 1997	Pittsburgh Steelers	30	Chicago Bears	17	Croke Park	(Republic of Ireland) Dublin
August 4, 1997	Miami Dolphins	38	Denver Broncos	19	Estadio Guillermo Cañedo	Mexico City
August 16, 1997	Green Bay Packers	35	Buffalo Bills	3	SkyDome	(Canada) Toronto
August 2, 1998	Green Bay Packers	27	Kansas City Chiefs	24	Tokyo Dome	(Japan) Tokyo
August 15, 1998	San Francisco 49ers	24	Seattle Seahawks	21	BC Place Stadium	(Canada) Vancouver
August 17, 1998	New England Patriots	21	Dallas Cowboys	3	Estadio Azteca	Mexico City
August 8, 1999	Denver Broncos	20	San Diego Chargers	17	Stadium Australia	(Australia) Sydney
August 6, 2000	Atlanta Falcons	20	Dallas Cowboys	9	Tokyo Dome	(Japan) Tokyo
August 19, 2000	Indianapolis Colts	24	Pittsburgh Steelers	23	Estadio Azteca	Mexico City
August 27, 2001	Dallas Cowboys	21	Oakland Raiders	6	Estadio Azteca	Mexico City
August 3, 2002	Washington Redskins	38	San Francisco 49ers	7	Osaka Dome	(Japan) Osaka
August 2, 2003	Tampa Bay Buccaneers	30	New York Jets	14	Tokyo Dome	(Japan) Tokyo
August 6, 2005	Atlanta Falcons	27	Indianapolis Colts	21	Tokyo Dome	(Japan) Tokyo

== Standings ==
Team	GP	W	L	T	Pct	Pts for	Pts against
Atlanta Falcons	2	2	0	0	1.000	47	30
Buffalo Bills	4	2	2	0	.500	35	75
Chicago Bears	3	1	2	0	.333	41	57
Cleveland Browns	1	0	1	0	.000	13	17
Dallas Cowboys	9	1	7	1	.167	88	158
Denver Broncos	7	3	4	0	.429	149	156
Detroit Lions	1	0	0	1	.500	13	13
Green Bay Packers	2	2	0	0	1.000	62	27
Houston Oilers	2	2	0	0	1.000	40	23
Indianapolis Colts	2	1	1	0	.500	45	50
Kansas City Chiefs	4	1	3	0	.250	68	69
Los Angeles Rams	3	3	0	0	1.000	63	43
Miami Dolphins	4	4	0	0	1.000	115	84
Minnesota Vikings	2	2	0	0	1.000	37	15
New England Patriots	2	1	1	0	.500	35	33
New Orleans Saints	2	2	0	0	1.000	45	26
New York Giants	1	1	0	0	1.000	28	20
New York Jets	1	0	1	0	.000	14	30
Oakland/L.A. Raiders	4	1	3	0	.250	58	79
Philadelphia Eagles	3	1	2	0	.333	46	58
Pittsburgh Steelers	5	2	3	0	.400	107	96
San Diego Chargers	3	1	2	0	.333	57	58
San Francisco 49ers	8	4	4	0	.500	134	162
Seattle Seahawks	2	0	2	0	.000	28	34
Tampa Bay Buccaneers	1	1	0	0	1.000	30	14
Washington Redskins	2	1	1	0	.500	53	24

== See also ==
- List of National Football League games played outside the United States
