= List of canceled and rescheduled NFL games =

The following is a list of games that have been canceled and rescheduled by the National Football League (NFL) since 1933. Prior to this date, it was extremely common for games to be canceled; however, since that year, the NFL has only canceled regular season games four times, two of them for labor disputes between the league and the National Football League Players Association (NFLPA). Seven weeks of regular season games were canceled in 1982 and one week of regular season games was canceled in 1987. A contest between the Boston Redskins and Philadelphia Eagles on November 17, 1935, was canceled due to weather, and a 2022–23 Week 17 contest between the Buffalo Bills and Cincinnati Bengals was suspended and eventually canceled outright following a critical in-game medical emergency to defensive back Damar Hamlin.

Preseason contests have seen comparatively more cancellations, since the games do not count in the standings. Two of these games, the 1974 Chicago College All-Star Game and the 2011 Pro Football Hall of Fame Game, were canceled because of off-season labor stoppages that were resolved prior to the start of the rest of the preseason. Three games were canceled as the result of unsafe playing fields: a 1995 NFL preseason game between the San Diego Chargers and the Houston Oilers, a 2001 preseason game between the Baltimore Ravens and the Philadelphia Eagles, and the 2016 Pro Football Hall of Fame Game. Two preseason games in 2017 and 2021 were canceled for weather. At least one other announced game was discarded before it was officially placed on the schedule. The proposed China Bowl exhibition was to have been played in August 2007 but was postponed indefinitely before the 2007 schedule was released, with all plans for the game formally canceled before December 2008.

The league has run into other instances in which a game cannot realistically be played on its scheduled date, including weather-related rainouts and conflicts with college football or Major League Baseball over the use of shared stadiums. Unlike baseball, the NFL generally plays through even the coldest and most precipitous of weather unless such weather makes the stadium unusable or it becomes unsafe for spectators to attend the match. In such cases where a game cannot be played on its scheduled date, especially in the regular season, the league has the options of rescheduling the contest to any available day and, if the stadium cannot be used, relocating the contest to the opponent's stadium or a neutral site (usually another nearby NFL stadium or a suitably sized modern college football venue). Until the January 14, 2024, Steelers–Bills wild card playoff game, such measures have not been necessary for any individual game in the playoffs.

== 1920s and 1930s ==
Canceling games was far more common in the 1920s and early 1930s, in the founding years of the league. When a team did not want to play a game, they could cancel without any punishment or penalty.

After league schedules were standardized in 1933, cancellations were effectively banned; thus, teams would have to forfeit the game or postpone if a cancellation was due to issues outside the team's control. The last unpunished cancellation of a regular season NFL game was a November 17, 1935, contest between the Boston Redskins and Philadelphia Eagles at Philadelphia, which was canceled due to driving rain and snow that left the field unplayable.

There have been no forfeits in the league's history; a 1921 game between the Rochester Jeffersons and the Washington Senators is occasionally listed as a forfeit, but because of the lax cancellation rules of the time and uncertainty over which team (if either) was at fault for the game not being played, the game is listed in modern records as a cancellation.

While several games were removed from the schedules of the NFL teams of the early 1940s, the issues (namely, World War II, the exodus of marquee talent to the war effort, and restrictions on usage of resources) were already foreseen by the start of the 1942 season, meaning the league was able to issue shortened schedules without having to cancel any scheduled contests.

== 1974 players' strike ==
The 1974 College All-Star Game, an exhibition game that pitted the most recent Super Bowl champion (Miami Dolphins) against a team composed entirely of rookies, was canceled as a result of a players’ strike. The strike was resolved before any further games were canceled; the Pro Football Hall of Fame Game, along with the rest of the 1974 NFL season, went on as scheduled, although at least one game was held with the Denver Broncos using a squad of rookie replacement players.

== 1982 players' strike ==
In 1982, players began a 57-day strike following the completion of Week 2 of the regular season. As a result of the impasse, games were simply canceled until a settlement was reached (ultimately, Weeks 3 to 10). Upon reaching that settlement, the NFL announced that Weeks 11 to 16 would be played as scheduled, and the games originally scheduled for Week 3 of the season would be played following the completion of the resumed regular season as a new Week 17, with the playoffs pushed back one week. Later, the NFL decided to use the final week 17 to hold various intra-division games from canceled Weeks 3 to 10 instead of merely playing the Week 3 games. This was done to increase attendance and to allow some teams to balance out home and away games, to the extent possible (either five home and four away, or four home and five away). Because the 1982 shortened season would include only nine regular season contests for each team, the NFL announced that the three divisions in each of the two conferences would be eliminated for the purpose of determining playoff qualifications, and the regular season would be followed by an expansion of the playoffs from 10 to 16 teams. With this, each conference had 14 teams competing for 8 playoff spots, with division standings being disregarded in favor of overall conference standings. Each of the first three rounds of the playoffs was pushed back one week in order to make room for the new week 17, which was originally scheduled as the Wild Card weekend. This was possible because there was an idle week between the Conference Championship games and the Super Bowl. The Super Bowl and Pro Bowl were held as originally scheduled.

=== 1982 games lost ===
Note: Some of the games originally scheduled for Weeks 3 to 10, listed below, were rescheduled to a new, final Week 17.

==== Week 3 – September 26 ====
Day	Visiting Team	Home Team
Thursday (Note: This was the first scheduled regular season meeting between the Falcons and Chiefs since 1972, and only the second in history. Their second meeting was played in 1985.)	Atlanta	Kansas City
Sunday	Buffalo	Houston
Sunday	Chicago	San Francisco
Sunday	Denver	New Orleans
Sunday	L.A. Rams	Philadelphia
Sunday	Miami	Green Bay
Sunday (Note: This was the first scheduled meeting between the Giants and Steelers since 1976, and the two teams actually next oppose each other in 1985.)	N.Y. Giants	Pittsburgh
Sunday	N.Y. Jets	Baltimore
Sunday	Seattle	New England
Sunday	Tampa Bay	Detroit
Monday	Cincinnati	Cleveland

==== Week 4– October 3 ====
Day	Visiting Team	Home Team
Sunday	Baltimore	Detroit
Sunday	Cleveland	Washington
Sunday	Houston	N.Y. Jets
Sunday	Kansas City	Seattle
Sunday	L.A. Rams	St. Louis
Sunday	Miami	Cincinnati
Sunday	Minnesota	Chicago
Sunday	New England	Buffalo
Sunday	New Orleans	L.A. Raiders
Sunday	N.Y. Giants	Dallas
Sunday (Note: This was the first scheduled regular season meeting between the Eagles and the Packers since 1979. The two teams next met in 1987.)	Philadelphia	Green Bay
Sunday	Pittsburgh	Denver
Sunday (Note: These two teams had previously met in 1979, and did not meet again until the 1988 NFL season.)	San Diego	Atlanta
Monday	San Francisco	Tampa Bay

==== Week 5– October 10 ====
Day	Visiting Team	Home Team
Sunday	Atlanta	L.A. Rams
Sunday	Buffalo	Baltimore
Sunday	Cincinnati	New England
Sunday	Cleveland	L.A. Raiders
Sunday	Denver	N.Y. Jets
Sunday	Detroit	Miami
Sunday	Green Bay	Chicago
Sunday	Houston	Kansas City
Sunday	Minnesota	Tampa Bay
Sunday	San Francisco	New Orleans
Sunday	Seattle	San Diego
Sunday	St. Louis	N.Y. Giants
Sunday	Washington	Dallas
Monday	Philadelphia	Pittsburgh

==== Week 6 – October 17 ====
Day	Visiting Team	Home Team
Sunday	Atlanta	Detroit
Sunday	Baltimore	Cleveland
Sunday	Chicago	St. Louis
Sunday	Cincinnati (Note: This was this franchise's first scheduled regular season game against the Giants since 1977, and first ever road game. The team next played the Giants in 1985, and did not visit the Giants until 1994.)	N.Y. Giants
Sunday	Dallas	Philadelphia
Sunday	Denver	Houston
Sunday	Kansas City	San Diego
Sunday	L.A. Raiders	Seattle
Sunday	New England	Miami
Sunday	New Orleans	Minnesota
Sunday	Pittsburgh	Washington
Sunday	Tampa Bay	Green Bay
Monday	Buffalo	N.Y. Jets

==== Week 7 – October 24 ====
Day	Visiting Team	Home Team
Sunday	Dallas	Cincinnati
Sunday (Note: The Lions and Bills had last played in 1979 and would not play another regular season game against each other until 1991.)	Detroit	Buffalo
Sunday	Green Bay	Minnesota
Sunday	L.A. Raiders	Denver
Sunday	New Orleans	L.A. Rams
Sunday	St. Louis	New England
Sunday	San Diego	Seattle
Sunday	San Francisco	Atlanta
Sunday	Tampa Bay	Chicago
Sunday	Washington	Houston
Monday	N.Y. Giants	Philadelphia

==== Week 8 – October 31 ====
Day	Visiting Team	Home Team
Sunday	Buffalo	Denver
Sunday	Chicago	Green Bay
Sunday	Dallas	N.Y. Giants
Sunday	Houston	Cleveland
Sunday	L.A. Rams	San Diego
Sunday	Miami	L.A. Raiders
Sunday	New England	N.Y. Jets
Sunday	Philadelphia	St. Louis
Sunday	Pittsburgh	Cincinnati
Sunday	San Francisco	Washington
Sunday	Seattle	Kansas City
Sunday	Tampa Bay	Baltimore
Monday	Detroit	Minnesota

==== Week 9 – November 7 ====
Day	Visiting Team	Home Team
Sunday	Atlanta	Chicago
Sunday	Baltimore	New England
Sunday	Detroit	Philadelphia
Sunday	Green Bay	Tampa Bay
Sunday	Houston	Pittsburgh
Sunday	Kansas City	L.A. Raiders
Sunday	L.A. Rams	New Orleans
Sunday	Minnesota	San Francisco
Sunday	N.Y. Giants	Cleveland
Sunday	N.Y. Jets	Buffalo
Sunday	St. Louis	Dallas
Sunday	Washington	Cincinnati
Monday	San Diego	Miami

==== Week 10 – November 14 ====
Day	Visiting Team	Home Team
Sunday	Cleveland	Miami
Sunday	Dallas	San Francisco
Sunday	Denver	Kansas City
Sunday (Note: This was the first scheduled regular season meeting of the Raiders and the Colts since 1975, when the Raiders were based in Oakland. They next oppose one another in 1984, by which time the Colts had moved to Indianapolis. The Raiders next played in Baltimore opposing the relocated Ravens in that franchise's first-ever regular season game in 1996.)	L.A. Raiders	Baltimore
Sunday	Minnesota	Washington
Sunday	New Orleans	San Diego
Sunday	N.Y. Giants	L.A. Rams
Sunday	N.Y. Jets	Pittsburgh
Sunday	Seattle	St. Louis
Monday	Philadelphia	Atlanta

=== Games postponed to new Week 17 ===
In order to ensure maximal attendance, and to balance out home and away games for each team, to the extent possible (either five home and four away, or four home and five away), the NFL made 12 of the 14 games in the final week of the rescheduled season (Week 17) select intra-division games that were picked from canceled Weeks 3 to 10, instead of merely playing out Week 3 games, as had originally been planned. This was the maximum number mathematically possible, since four of the six divisions at that time had an odd number of teams (the two games that were not intra-division were New York Jets at Kansas City Chiefs and Dallas Cowboys at Minnesota Vikings). The New York Giants at Philadelphia Eagles game originally scheduled for Week 7 on Monday was moved to Sunday, while the Dallas Cowboys at Minnesota Vikings game originally scheduled for Week 3 on Sunday was moved to Monday.

Org	Day	Visiting Team	Home Team
3	Sunday	St. Louis	Washington
3	Sunday	L.A. Raiders	San Diego
6	Sunday	L.A. Rams	San Francisco
7	Sunday	Cleveland	Pittsburgh
7	Sunday	Miami	Baltimore
7	Sunday	N.Y. Jets	Kansas City
7	Sunday	N.Y. Giants	Philadelphia
8	Sunday	Atlanta	New Orleans
9	Sunday	Denver	Seattle
10	Sunday	Buffalo	New England
10	Sunday	Chicago	Tampa Bay
10	Sunday	Cincinnati	Houston
10	Sunday	Green Bay	Detroit
3	Monday	Dallas	Minnesota

== 1987 players' strike ==
In 1987, the players went on strike for a second time in-season, again following the second week of the campaign. However, unlike 1982, the owners took the bold step of using replacement players. After missing just one week of action, the NFL resumed with replacement players for Week 4. By the time Week 6 had rolled around, enough players had crossed the picket lines and forced an agreement to let the regular players play again. The canceled games of Week 3 were not made up, and the league counted the three weeks of game results featuring the replacement players as regular season games toward each team's final standings. By Week 7, the teams had all players back in action, with all teams completing a 15-game schedule. Also unlike 1982, there was no change to the playoff format that season.

=== 1987 games lost ===
==== Week 3 – September 27 ====
Day	Visiting Team	Home Team
Sunday	Atlanta	New Orleans
Sunday	Buffalo	Dallas
Sunday	Chicago	Detroit
Sunday	Cincinnati	L.A. Rams
Sunday	Green Bay	Tampa Bay
Sunday (Note: This was the first scheduled regular season meeting of the Colts and the Cardinals in St. Louis since 1978, when the Colts were based in Baltimore. The Colts didn't play again at the Cardinals until 1990, by which time the Cardinals had relocated to Phoenix, and didn't play again in St. Louis until 2001, when they played against the Rams.)	Indianapolis	St. Louis
Sunday	Minnesota	Kansas City
Sunday	L.A. Raiders	Houston
Sunday	New England	Washington
Sunday (Note: This was the first scheduled regular season game between the Dolphins and the Giants since the Dolphins’ 1972 perfect season. As of 1972 they were scheduled to meet in 1977, but this meeting was canceled so the Dolphins could play the Seahawks and the Giants play the Buccaneers. Miami and the Giants finally played their second-ever regular season game in 1990, and would face each other in Miami for the first time in 1993.)	N.Y. Giants	Miami
Sunday	N.Y. Jets	Pittsburgh
Sunday	Philadelphia	San Francisco
Sunday	Seattle	San Diego
Monday	Denver	Cleveland

== 1995 preseason game in Houston ==
An August 19, 1995, preseason game between the San Diego Chargers and the Houston Oilers was the first game in NFL history to be canceled before kickoff. A 10-yard long piece of artificial turf at midfield recently installed at midfield failed to mesh with the rest of the surface. The new piece ran between the 45-yard lines, and an NFL official determined that the piece endangered the players.

== 2001 preseason game in Philadelphia ==
An August 13, 2001, preseason game between the Baltimore Ravens and the Philadelphia Eagles was canceled because of an unplayable playing surface at Veterans Stadium.

Because the multi-purpose stadium was shared by both the Eagles and the Philadelphia Phillies baseball team, the new artificial surface, NexTurf, and previous artificial turf installations before it included cutouts that covered up the dirt infield around the bases. After examining the turf, Ravens head coach Brian Billick discovered a trench around the area where third base was covered up by one of the cutouts, and refused to let the Ravens take the field for warm-ups. Later, players from both teams reported that they sank into the turf in locations near the infield cutouts.

City crews unsuccessfully tried to fix the problem, forcing the game to be canceled. Team president Joe Banner was irate after the game, calling the stadium's conditions "absolutely unacceptable" and "an embarrassment to the city of Philadelphia."

City officials, however, promised that the stadium would be suitable for play when the regular season started. The Eagles would move into Lincoln Financial Field in 2003, and the Phillies would move into their own separate ballpark, Citizens Bank Park, in 2004.

== September 11, 2001, attacks ==
In the wake of the September 11 attacks, the NFL postponed its Week 2 games of the 2001 season, originally scheduled for September 16 and 17, until the end of the regular season. All playoff games following the 2001 regular season, including Super Bowl XXXVI and the 2002 Pro Bowl, were similarly rescheduled one week later.

This was in contrast to the wake of the John F. Kennedy assassination in 1963 when the NFL went ahead and played its full slate of games that week, a decision that then-NFL commissioner Pete Rozelle later regretted, though he also stated that Pierre Salinger, Kennedy's press secretary, had urged him to allow the games to be played. Meanwhile, the American Football League canceled week 12 of its 1963 season and later rescheduled those games.

== 2011 owners' lockout ==
On July 22, 2011, the NFL announced that the Pro Football Hall of Fame Game originally set for August 7 of that year between the Chicago Bears and the St. Louis Rams had been canceled due to an ongoing lockout that had been in place since March of that year. The league approved a new collective bargaining agreement on July 21, but at the same time announced the cancellation of the game, citing the fact that the players would not have enough time in training camp to prepare before the game.

The NFL also had contingency plans to cancel and/or postpone regular season games (up to eight) if a labor agreement could not be reached by the start of the regular season. The league did not have to implement the plans, since the players association agreed to terms with the NFL shortly before the start of the season proper on July 25, ending the lockout.

== 2016 Hall of Fame Game ==
The 2016 Pro Football Hall of Fame Game between the Green Bay Packers and the Indianapolis Colts was canceled at the last minute due to poor playing conditions at Tom Benson Hall of Fame Stadium.

Mike Silver of NFL.com reported that on the morning of game day, officials discovered the logos at midfield and in the end zones had been painted using paint which was not intended for use on the newly installed FieldTurf. Subsequently, the paint had not fully dried, and officials heated the field to speed up the drying process, causing the turf's rubber to melt; the affected areas were described as being slick and "like cement," making it impossible to get decent footing. Stadium officials attempted to address this by applying paint thinner to the turf, but a Packers employee noticed a label warning that the paint thinner could result in severe burns when exposed to skin, and alerted them to the discovery. When officially canceling the game, both the league and the Players Association cited safety concerns.

Both teams were told at 6:40 p.m., an hour and 20 minutes before kickoff, that the game was going to be canceled. However, fans in the stadium only learned of the pending cancellation via social media, and no official announcement was made until just before the scheduled 8 p.m. kickoff, which was greeted by boos and jeering.

== COVID-19 pandemic ==
=== 2020 ===
All 2020 preseason games and the 2021 Pro Bowl were canceled as a result of the COVID-19 pandemic. No regular season or playoff games were canceled, but several were rescheduled due to positive COVID-19 tests among teams.

Restrictions on team sports implemented by Santa Clara County, California, forced the San Francisco 49ers to relocate two of their home games during the regular season: the December 7 game against the Buffalo Bills and the December 13 game against the Washington Football Team. Both games were moved to State Farm Stadium in Glendale, Arizona. The 49ers would also play their January 3 game against the Seattle Seahawks in Arizona after Santa Clara County extended their restrictions to January 8, 2021.

==== Rescheduled games ====
Original Date	Original Week	Visiting team	Home team	Make-up date	Make-up week
October 4	Week 4	Pittsburgh Steelers	Tennessee Titans	October 25	Week 7
October 4	Week 4	New England Patriots	Kansas City Chiefs	October 5	Week 4
October 11	Week 5	Denver Broncos	New England Patriots	October 18	Week 6
October 11	Week 5	Buffalo Bills	Tennessee Titans	October 13	Week 5
October 15	Week 6	Kansas City Chiefs	Buffalo Bills	October 19	Week 6
October 18	Week 6	New York Jets	Los Angeles Chargers	November 22	Week 11
October 18	Week 6	Miami Dolphins	Denver Broncos	November 22	Week 11
October 25	Week 7	Pittsburgh Steelers	Baltimore Ravens	November 1	Week 8
October 25	Week 7	Los Angeles Chargers	Miami Dolphins	November 15	Week 10
November 1	Week 8	Jacksonville Jaguars	Los Angeles Chargers	October 25	Week 7
November 15	Week 10	New York Jets	Miami Dolphins	October 18	Week 6
November 22	Week 11	Los Angeles Chargers	Denver Broncos	November 1	Week 8
November 26	Week 12	Baltimore Ravens	Pittsburgh Steelers	December 2	Week 12
December 3	Week 13	Dallas Cowboys	Baltimore Ravens	December 8	Week 13
December 6	Week 13	Washington Football Team	Pittsburgh Steelers	December 7	Week 13

=== 2021 ===
In Week 15 of the 2021 season, three games were postponed due to multiple positive COVID-19 tests. The Las Vegas Raiders–Cleveland Browns game was rescheduled from Saturday, December 18, to Monday, December 20, while both the Seattle Seahawks–Los Angeles Rams and Washington Football Team–Philadelphia Eagles games were rescheduled from Sunday, December 19, to Tuesday, December 21.

== 2022 Week 17 Buffalo Bills–Cincinnati Bengals game ==
On January 2, 2023, during the 2022 season Week 17 Monday Night Football game between the Buffalo Bills and Cincinnati Bengals, Bills safety Damar Hamlin tackled Bengals wide receiver Tee Higgins during the first quarter. Hamlin briefly stood up before collapsing to the ground. Hamlin was placed on a stretcher and an ambulance came onto the field as most players from both teams came to kneel or stand around Hamlin. First responders initiated CPR and administered defibrillation to Hamlin on the field before taking him to the nearby University of Cincinnati Medical Center, where it was discovered that he suffered cardiac arrest. The game was suspended with 5:58 left in the first quarter with the Bengals leading 7–3. Referees on the field apparently had initially planned to resume the game after a short 5-minute warmup period, which was reported separately by game television and radio broadcasters ESPN and Westwood One; after discussions between Bengals head coach Zac Taylor and Bills head coach Sean McDermott, both teams left the field. The game was postponed indefinitely shortly thereafter, just over one hour after Hamlin collapsed. The NFL later denied the reports that players would resume after a warmup period.

On January 5, 2023, the NFL announced that the game was canceled and would not be continued. There was only one week remaining in the regular season, which led to the official abandonment of the game. One day later, the NFL announced temporary changes to the playoff format to accommodate the missing postseason implications of the canceled game. The changes included a potential neutral site AFC Championship Game if the Kansas City Chiefs were to obtain the top seed and played the Bills or Bengals in the game with an identical number of losses, a potential neutral site AFC Divisional Round if the Chiefs were to obtain the number 2 seed and play the Bengals in that game with an identical number of losses, and a potential coin flip to decide seedings between the Bengals and the Ravens if the Bengals were to lose to the Ravens and the Chargers beat the Broncos. In Week 18, Cincinnati, Buffalo, and Kansas City all won, setting up a potential Bills–Chiefs AFC Championship Game at a neutral site, but not needing a coin flip to decide home field for a Ravens–Bengals wild card game. The league then announced on January 12 that Mercedes-Benz Stadium in Atlanta would host the Buffalo–Kansas City AFC Championship Game if both teams advanced that far; however, the Chiefs ultimately hosted the game at Arrowhead Stadium following the Bengals' victory over the Bills in the divisional round.

== 2020s preseason games ==
=== 2023 preseason ===
Two 2023 preseason games were suspended during play due to injury, one at Lambeau Field during the preseason Week 2 matchup between the New England Patriots and Green Bay Packers in which Patriots' rookie cornerback Isaiah Bolden collided with teammate Calvin Munson which left Bolden unable to get up. Bolden was taken to a local hospital and "had feeling in all his extremities, but has been taken to a local hospital for further tests and observation." This was similar to the prior mentioned Bills–Bengals regular season game which ended during play due to injury on the field. The game would not be finished with 10:27 left in the 4th quarter and the Patriots were awarded the "win" 21–17. Bolden was released from the hospital the following day as reported by the Patriots.

During Week 3 of the preseason, the Miami Dolphins played the Jacksonville Jaguars when rookie wide receiver Daewood Davis would exit the game in a stretcher following a hit by Jacksonville linebacker Dequan Jackson on a pass play with 8:32 left in the 4th quarter. He would be carted off the field and be conscious with movement in all extremities. Davis would be taken to Baptist Medical Center in Jacksonville, Florida following the suspension of the game. Both instances were the second and third time in modern NFL history a game was suspended due to injury after Damar Hamlin's collapse in Week 17 in the prior season. Davis would be released from the hospital the following day.

In both situations, the games had reached the fourth quarter, and any games called by inclement weather rule would have been irrelevant. Declaring the games terminated legally meant the games counted and neither game was canceled, but simply terminated, similar to terminating a game early because of lightning.

=== 2025 preseason ===
A 2025 preseason game was suspended due to injury. At the start of the fourth quarter of the Week 1 matchup between the Detroit Lions and Atlanta Falcons, Lions cornerback Morice Norris assisted with tackling Falcons running back Nate Carter when Norris' head snapped backwards due to contact with Carter's body. Norris was unable to get up and the game was stopped with 14:50 left in the quarter. Norris was removed from the field by ambulance and taken to a local hospital where he would remain over the weekend. The game resumed afterwards, but with both teams proceeding to stand on the field without attempting to score when the ball was snapped. The game clock continued to run until 6:31 left in the game, when referee Shawn Hochuli announced that the game was suspended by the league. The Lions were leading 17–10 prior to the game being suspended.

== Affected games due to severe weather and natural disasters ==
In the modern era, severe weather or natural disasters have affected some games, but only in the cases of Hurricane Harvey and Hurricane Ida has a game been canceled outright. Others were either switched to a different location, or to a different date in the schedule.

The 1989 Loma Prieta earthquake damaged Candlestick Park, forcing the San Francisco 49ers to play their next home game on October 22 against the New England Patriots at Stanford University's Stanford Stadium.

In 1992, Hurricane Andrew forced the September 6 opening-day game between the New England Patriots and the Miami Dolphins at Joe Robbie Stadium to be rescheduled to October 18, when both teams originally had a bye week.

In the wake of the October 25, 2003 Cedar Fire, California Governor Arnold Schwarzenegger declared a state of emergency and activated the National Guard to assist in the disaster relief process. Because of the soot and particulate matter in the air from the fire two days earlier, the NFL was forced to move the Monday Night Football game on October 27 between the San Diego Chargers and the Miami Dolphins to Sun Devil Stadium in Tempe, Arizona.

In 2004, the Cincinnati Bengals at Tampa Bay Buccaneers preseason game, scheduled for August 14, was rescheduled to August 16, because of Hurricane Charley.

During the 2004 regular season, the Tennessee Titans at Miami Dolphins opening-day game, scheduled for September 12 at 1 p.m. ET, was rescheduled to Saturday, September 11 at 1 p.m. ET because of Hurricane Ivan, and the Pittsburgh Steelers at Miami Dolphins game scheduled for September 26, at 1 p.m. ET was moved to 8:30 p.m. ET because of Hurricane Jeanne. The latter game became notable as the first NFL start of Steelers quarterback Ben Roethlisberger.

Hurricane Katrina in 2005 damaged the Louisiana Superdome. The NFL decided that the New Orleans Saints' first regularly scheduled home game against the New York Giants be played in Giants Stadium in New Jersey, with the Saints remaining the "home" team for administrative purposes only. For the rest of the season, the Saints home games were split between the Alamodome in San Antonio and Louisiana State University's Tiger Stadium.

In 2005, the NFL moved up the Kansas City Chiefs at Miami Dolphins game from October 23 at 1:00 p.m. ET to Friday, October 21 at 7:00 p.m. ET because of Hurricane Wilma. Respecting a longstanding policy not to schedule games in conflict with Friday night high school football games that dates back to a 1960s federal antitrust law, the NFL televised the game on CBS affiliates only within 75 miles of Kansas City and Miami. It also forced the Chiefs to travel to Miami on the day of the game, which, if not for an "act of God", would have been a violation of the NFL's collective bargaining agreement with the National Football League Players Association which requires a visiting team to arrive in the host city no later than 24 hours prior to kickoff.

Hurricane Ike forced several changes to the 2008 schedule. The Houston Texans' Week 2 home game against the Baltimore Ravens was first postponed to Monday, September 15, before Ike made landfall; damage to Reliant Stadium forced a further postponement, to Week 10, on November 9, giving the Texans and the Ravens their bye weeks in Week 2. Furthermore, to accommodate this move, Houston's home game against the Cincinnati Bengals was moved forward from November 9 to October 26, pushing the Bengals’ bye week from Week 8 to Week 10.

In 2010, a severe storm in Minnesota deposited over 17 inches or 0.43 metres of snow on the Hubert H. Humphrey Metrodome, which caused the venue's inflatable roof (a form of dome now mostly obsolete for major sports) to collapse about 24 hours later, early in the morning of December 12. The Minnesota Vikings had been scheduled to host the New York Giants that afternoon. Prior to the collapse, the game had already been postponed to Monday night, December 13, after airport closures prevented the Giants from arriving on time. The game was relocated to Ford Field in Detroit, still played Monday night. The game would be notable as the ending of Brett Favre's NFL-record 297 consecutive starts streak. The Vikings’ December 20 game against the Chicago Bears was moved to TCF Bank Stadium on the University of Minnesota campus. The collapse affected no further NFL games, as the rest of the Vikings’ 2010 season consisted of road games, and the team had already been eliminated from playoff contention. The roof collapse was a factor in the Metrodome being demolished and replaced with hard-roofed U.S. Bank Stadium a few years later.

On December 26, 2010, a Sunday Night Football game between the Minnesota Vikings and the Philadelphia Eagles was postponed to Tuesday, December 28, because of a severe snowstorm in Philadelphia. It was the first Tuesday NFL game in 64 years. In 2014, a severe snowstorm that hit the Buffalo area forced a New York Jets–Buffalo Bills game, originally scheduled for November 23, to be moved to Detroit's indoor Ford Field on November 24. In both cases, concerns about fan safety prompted the postponements.

The 2017 Governor's Cup, an annual preseason matchup between the Dallas Cowboys and the Houston Texans was canceled by the effects of Hurricane Harvey. The game, originally scheduled for August 31 in Houston, was moved to Dallas, as Houston was severely flooded as the result of the rains from Harvey and the team had temporarily relocated to Dallas until the storm passed. The Texans opted instead to cancel the game to allow the team more time to relocate back to Houston.

Hurricane Irma prompted the postponement of a game between the Miami Dolphins and the Tampa Bay Buccaneers, originally scheduled for September 10, 2017, to November 19; both teams coincidentally were scheduled for the same bye week, leaving the latter date available for the game to be made up.

Hurricane Ida caused the cancellation of the Arizona Cardinals–New Orleans Saints preseason match-up on August 28, 2021. The aftermath of the hurricane forced the Saints' regular-season opener against the Green Bay Packers on September 12, 2021, to be moved to TIAA Bank Field in Jacksonville, Florida.

Due to a severe winter storm in Buffalo, the Cleveland Browns–Buffalo Bills game on November 20, 2022, was moved to Ford Field. As a result, the Bills played in Detroit in back-to-back weeks as they visited the Detroit Lions on Thanksgiving, November 24.

In 2024, the Buffalo Bills' wild card playoff game against the Pittsburgh Steelers at Highmark Stadium was originally scheduled for Sunday, January 14 at 1:00 p.m. ET but was moved to 4:30 p.m. on Monday due to a winter storm expected for the Buffalo region. This was a decision made by the NFL and New York state governor Kathy Hochul.

In 2025, the Los Angeles Rams' wild card playoff game against the Minnesota Vikings on Monday, January 13 was relocated to State Farm Stadium in Glendale, Arizona due to an ongoing series of wildfires in the Los Angeles area.

== Effects of shared stadiums and sports complexes ==
There have also been rare occasions in which games had to be pushed back one night because of a last-minute scheduling conflict in the facility of those games, most notably when an NFL team has shared a home stadium with a team from Major League Baseball (MLB) and the baseball team has needed the building for a post-season game. This was a frequent occurrence when there were several shared stadiums across the country, but after 2012 only one such venue remained: Oakland Coliseum in Oakland, home of the NFL's Raiders and MLB's Athletics; this arrangement ended in 2020 when the Raiders moved to Las Vegas. Most of the stadiums listed required day-long conversions from a football gridiron to a baseball diamond and outfield, or vice versa, including the maneuvering of stadium seating designed to be angled for each sport, the building of temporary stands, and the marking of the field for either sport, along with removal of the pitcher's mound and bases. Additionally until the FieldTurf era, an additional step taken was the filling or covering of the base sliding pits on artificial turf fields.

Although no NFL/MLB-shared stadiums remain, there are eight teams whose current NFL stadiums share the same parking lots and other ancillary facilities with an adjacent MLB ballpark (Baltimore Ravens, Cincinnati Bengals, Dallas Cowboys, Detroit Lions, Kansas City Chiefs, Philadelphia Eagles, Pittsburgh Steelers, and Seattle Seahawks), thus also preventing both teams from playing simultaneously.

Since the NFL knows the MLB schedule well in advance of its own schedule being released, it is able to schedule its September games in particular in order to avoid facility conflicts, and even simply to avoid unnecessary competition with local MLB teams for an audience in markets where the venues are not in close proximity to one another. Scheduling conflicts with MLB are more likely to occur in October, i.e. during the MLB postseason since the venues for these games are not known in advance.

Some tactics used to prevent conflicts include scheduling a team that shares a stadium with an MLB team to a schedule of road games, home division games that could be swapped for a road game in the event of a conflict caused by an MLB team making the postseason, or home games with a team that has a mutual bye week that the game could be moved to said bye week if an MLB team makes the postseason through the end of October.

On October 12, 1964, the St. Louis Cardinals were forced to move their scheduled home game against the Baltimore Colts to Memorial Stadium, since St. Louis' Busch Stadium I was being used for the 1964 World Series by the St. Louis Cardinals baseball team. Even though Game 5 of the World Series was played that day at Yankee Stadium, the football Cardinals could not use the stadium until the baseball team, the stadium's owner, had completed its season.

The Minnesota Twins' 1965 World Series appearance led to the Sunday afternoon October 10, New York Giants at Minnesota Vikings game to be moved forward to Saturday night, October 9.

The Atlanta Falcons were forced to move their October 5, 1969, home game against the Baltimore Colts from Atlanta Stadium to Grant Field at Georgia Tech because the Atlanta Braves hosted Game 2 of the 1969 National League Championship Series. The same day, the Minnesota Vikings moved their home game against the Green Bay Packers from Metropolitan Stadium to Memorial Stadium at the University of Minnesota because of an American League Championship Series game hosted by the Minnesota Twins. One week later, the Philadelphia Eagles’ game in Baltimore against the Baltimore Colts was pushed from Sunday, October 12, to Monday night, October 13, to accommodate Game 2 of the 1969 World Series hosted by the Baltimore Orioles. The following week, the World Series prompted the American Football League to move the game at Shea Stadium between the Houston Oilers and the New York Jets from Sunday, October 19, to Monday night, October 20 due to the New York Mets hosting a game.

In 1973, the New York Jets faced the same situation as the 1964 Cardinals. The New York Mets unexpectedly reached the 1973 World Series, and under the terms of the Jets’ lease at Shea Stadium in place at the time, there could be no football games at the stadium in Queens until the Mets’ season was complete. Thus, the Jets were forced to move their October 21 game against the Pittsburgh Steelers from Shea Stadium to Three Rivers Stadium, even though the final game of the Series at Shea Stadium was played October 18 (Games 6 and 7 were scheduled away games for the Mets).

In 1979, the Philadelphia Eagles and the Washington Redskins switched the dates of their two games with the Eagles hosting on October 7 (instead of October 21) and the Redskins hosting on October 21 (instead of October 7). This was due to the visit of Pope John Paul II to Washington on October 7. A similar situation happened to the Eagles in 1983 where they were forced to switch the dates of their games with the Dallas Cowboys because the Philadelphia Phillies were playing in the 1983 World Series. The Eagles were originally scheduled to play the Cowboys at Veterans Stadium on October 16, 1983; however this game conflicted with Game 5 of the World Series. The game was moved to Texas Stadium and the November 6 game was moved to Veterans Stadium.

In 1987, Game 5 of the 1987 National League Championship Series was hosted by San Francisco Giants at Candlestick Park, prompting the San Francisco 49ers and the Atlanta Falcons to switch home dates for their two games that season; the 49ers visited Atlanta on October 11, and the Falcons went to San Francisco on December 20.

In 1987, Game 2 of the 1987 World Series hosted by the Minnesota Twins led to the Minnesota Vikings and the Tampa Bay Buccaneers to switch home dates for their two games that season. The following week, Game 7 of that Series led NFL to reschedule the Denver Broncos at Minnesota Vikings game to the following Monday night, October 26.

In 1989, the October 8, New Orleans Saints and San Francisco 49ers switched home dates (October 8 originally in San Francisco and November 6 originally in New Orleans) as a result of the San Francisco Giants hosting National League Championship Series games on October 7, 8 and 9.

In 1997, Game 7 of the 1997 World Series hosted by the Florida Marlins on October 26 caused the NFL to reschedule the Chicago Bears at Miami Dolphins game for the following Monday night, October 27.

In 2001, a potential Oakland Athletics baseball playoff game forced the Oakland Raiders to play their contest against the Dallas Cowboys two weeks in advance to avoid a possible conflict, when both clubs originally had their bye week (as it turned out, the Athletics ended up getting eliminated a few days before the originally scheduled date of the Cowboys–Raiders game).

In 2009, the New York Giants–Philadelphia Eagles game at Lincoln Financial Field was moved from 4:15 p.m. ET to 1:00 p.m. to accommodate the Philadelphia Phillies hosting Game 4 of the 2009 World Series at adjacent Citizens Bank Park.

In 2013, the Oakland Athletics playing in the 2013 American League Division Series forced the Oakland Raiders to postpone their originally scheduled Sunday afternoon game against the San Diego Chargers from a 1:25 p.m. PT kickoff to 8:35 p.m. (11:35 p.m. ET).

The opening game of the 2013 season on September 5, which would traditionally have been hosted by the Baltimore Ravens as the defending Super Bowl XLVII champions, was instead a road contest at the Denver Broncos. A Baltimore Orioles home game against the Chicago White Sox was scheduled for Oriole Park at Camden Yards that night. The Ravens' M&T Bank Stadium is next door to Camden Yards, and the Ravens and Orioles were unable to resolve issues which centered on parking and traffic.

In 2020, the Kansas City Chiefs, the defending Super Bowl champions, and the Kansas City Royals, Kansas City's MLB team, were to have both played games on the same day, September 10. The Royals play at Kauffman Stadium, which is next door to the Chiefs’ home stadium Arrowhead Stadium, with both teams sharing the same parking lots. The Royals, Chiefs, NFL, and MLB had agreed to have the Royals move their game to September 8, as part of a doubleheader against the Oakland Athletics. The COVID-19 pandemic beginning a month later made the coordination moot, as the Royals didn't host fans through their delayed season (and were away that day in their revised schedule), and the Chiefs opened the season with 20% capacity.

On Sunday, October 16, 2022, the Seattle Seahawks were scheduled to play the Arizona Cardinals at 1:05 pm PT. The preceding night, the Seattle Mariners played Game 3 of the American League Division Series (ALDS) against the Houston Astros. Had the Mariners won that game, making Game 4 necessary, the Mariners would have played Game 4 on Sunday at 12:07 pm, and the Seahawks would have delayed their kickoff time to 2:30 pm PT. Because the Mariners lost Game 3, and lost the ALDS 3–0, the Seahawks game was not rescheduled.
