= Pro Football Hall of Fame Game =

NFL exhibition match held annually in Canton, Ohio

Coordinates: 40.820°N 81.398°W

- Program from the inaugural 1962 game
- Stadium: Tom Benson Hall of Fame Stadium
- Location: Canton, Ohio, U.S.
- First played: 1962

2025 season
- Los Angeles Chargers 34; Detroit Lions 7

2026 season
- Carolina Panthers 33; Arizona Cardinals 30

The Pro Football Hall of Fame Game is an annual National Football League (NFL) preseason exhibition game in Canton, Ohio, held the weekend of the Pro Football Hall of Fame's induction ceremonies. The game is played at Tom Benson Hall of Fame Stadium, part of the Hall of Fame Village and located adjacent to the Hall of Fame building. The first game was played in August 1962, the year when ground was broken for the Hall of Fame, and it was used as a fundraiser for the construction project.

The game is generally held on a Thursday since 2017 and between July 31 and August 6 and is used to mark the opening of the NFL preseason. It is anticipated by fans and viewers as the first NFL contest since the prior season's Super Bowl, held nearly six months earlier.

== Team selection ==
Location in the United States
Location in Ohio

The two teams that play in the Pro Football Hall of Fame Game are typically selected by the league in advance of the remainder of the preseason schedule. The participants are usually announced around the time that the new Hall of Fame members are announced, which coincides with Super Bowl week. Often, when a particularly notable player will be entering the Hall of Fame that year, a team with which he had been strongly associated may be selected to play in the game to help maximize attendance and publicity of the game itself.

From 1971 to 2010, the opponents for each game usually included one AFC team and one NFC team. In 2009, as recognition of the 50th anniversary of the American Football League, the game paired two AFC teams who were part of the "original eight" franchises of the AFL (1960), the Tennessee Titans (dressed as their previous incarnation, the Houston Oilers) and the Buffalo Bills, whose owner, Ralph Wilson, was inducted into the Hall that year. An all-NFC matchup was scheduled for 2011, but it was canceled by the lockout; the following year, another intra-conference matchup of two NFC teams took its place. From 2011 onward, each team selected to play in the game has had at least one prominent alumnus being inducted into the Hall that year.

Since the Hall of Fame Game and the Hall of Fame induction ceremony are scheduled for the weekend before the normal NFL preseason season starts, both teams end up playing an additional exhibition game compared to the remaining teams in the league (formerly four, three as of 2021).

The last four expansion teams added to the league all played in the Hall of Fame Game as their first game. In 1995, expansion clubs Jacksonville and Carolina played each other, and Houston appeared in 2002. When the new Cleveland Browns returned to the league in 1999 with a rebooted roster, they played in the Hall of Fame Game.

The Baltimore Ravens, officially established in 1996 as a result of the Browns' relocation, did not play in the Hall of Fame Game until 2018. With the Ravens' participation, all 32 current NFL teams have at least one appearance.

=== Scheduling ===
Prior to the AFL–NFL merger, the Hall of Fame Game was played in August or September, in some cases at the end of the preseason. In 1970, it was moved to the beginning of the preseason. Prior to 2001, it was not uncommon for the game to be played in July. Since 2001, when the league permanently moved the start of the season to the weekend after Labor Day, the game has always been played in early August. In 2002, the Hall of Fame enshrinement ceremony was moved from the steps of the museum to the football stadium. This created a tight schedule between the ceremony and the game.

The 2011 game was originally scheduled between the St. Louis Rams and the Chicago Bears, but the game was canceled by an ongoing labor dispute that had disrupted nearly all league activity during the 2011 offseason. The two clubs had set a deadline of July 22 to ratify a resolution in enough time to prepare for the game: the league and players did not ratify the agreement until July 25, forcing cancellation of the game.

The 2016 edition, which was scheduled to be played between the Green Bay Packers and the Indianapolis Colts, was canceled at the last minute for unsafe playing conditions. Mike Silver of NFL.com reported that on the morning of the game, it was discovered that the logos at midfield and the end zones had been painted using paint which was not intended for use on the newly installed synthetic FieldTurf. Subsequently, the paint had not fully dried, and officials heated the field to speed up the drying process, causing its rubber infill to melt; the affected areas were described as being slick and "like cement," making it impossible to get decent footing. Stadium officials attempted to address this issue by applying paint thinner to the turf before a Packers employee alerted them to a label warning that the substance could result in burns when exposed to skin. In deciding to cancel the game, the league and the Players Association cited safety concerns. Both teams were told at 6:40 p.m. EDT, eighty minutes before kickoff, that the game was going to be canceled. However, fans in the stadium only learned of the pending cancellation via social media, and no official announcement was made until just before the scheduled 8 p.m. kickoff, which was greeted by boos and jeering.

The next year, in 2017, the game was moved to Thursday night, making it the first event of the Hall of Fame weekend: the game was moved prior to the ceremony to prevent a repeat of the 2016 incident, and has been maintained since. Immediately following the game, the stage and seating area for the Hall of Fame ceremony are erected in the stadium.

The game in 2020, which was scheduled to be played between the Dallas Cowboys and the Pittsburgh Steelers, as well as all other preseason games, was canceled by the COVID-19 pandemic. The matchup was held over for the 2021 game.

== Television and radio ==
Unlike the majority of NFL preseason games, which air on local television stations, the Hall of Fame Game airs nationwide. From 1999 to 2005, the game was held on Monday night, televised as part of ABC's Monday Night Football package. It had previously been held typically on Saturday afternoons, except from 1963 to 1965 on Sunday afternoons, televised as part of ABC's Wide World of Sports package (still using the MNF crew). In 1998, the game was put in the MNF package, and played on a Saturday night, which served as a test run for the move to Monday night.

Since 2006, the game has largely aired on NBC as part of the Sunday Night Football package (which replaced MNF as the NFL's flagship primetime broadcast that season), except in 2007 (when NBC planned to air the China Bowl preseason game in Beijing, which was postponed and ultimately canceled) and in all Summer Olympics years except 2008 (2012, 2016, 2021, 2024, 2028, and 2032) due to NBC's broadcast rights to the Games. In these years, the game is sold to one of the NFL's other media partners, such as NFL Network (under Thursday Night Football), ESPN/ABC (under the current iteration of Monday Night Football), and Fox. The 2024 game, which was broadcast by ESPN due to the 2024 Summer Olympics, was simulcast on ABC. CBS is presently the only linear television network that has yet to air the Hall of Fame Game. Prime Video also has yet to air it.

=== 1970s ===
- 1971 (ABC) Frank Gifford, Howard Cosell
- 1972 (ABC) Frank Gifford, Howard Cosell
- 1973 (ABC) Frank Gifford, Don Meredith, Howard Cosell
- 1974 (ABC) Frank Gifford, Fred Williamson, Howard Cosell
- 1975 (ABC) Frank Gifford, Alex Karras, Howard Cosell
- 1976 (ABC) Frank Gifford, Alex Karras, Howard Cosell
- 1977 (ABC) Chris Schenkel, Howard Cosell
- 1978 (ABC) Frank Gifford, Howard Cosell
- 1979 (ABC) Frank Gifford, Fran Tarkenton, Howard Cosell

=== 1980s ===
- 1980 (ABC) Frank Gifford, Fran Tarkenton, Howard Cosell
- 1981 (ABC) Frank Gifford, Fran Tarkenton, Howard Cosell
- 1982 (ABC) Frank Gifford, Howard Cosell
- 1983 (ABC) Frank Gifford, Howard Cosell
- 1984 (ABC) Bill Flemming, O.J. Simpson
- 1985 (ABC) Frank Gifford, O.J. Simpson, Joe Namath
- 1986 (ABC) Al Michaels, Frank Gifford
- 1987 (ABC) Al Michaels, Frank Gifford, Dan Dierdorf
- 1988 (ABC) Al Michaels, Frank Gifford, Dan Dierdorf
- 1989 (ABC) Al Michaels, Frank Gifford, Dan Dierdorf

=== 1990s ===
- 1990 (ABC) Al Michaels, Frank Gifford, Dan Dierdorf
- 1991 (ABC) Al Michaels, Frank Gifford, Dan Dierdorf
- 1992 (ABC) Al Michaels, Frank Gifford, Dan Dierdorf
- 1993 (ABC) Al Michaels, Frank Gifford, Dan Dierdorf
- 1994 (ABC) Al Michaels, Frank Gifford, Dan Dierdorf
- 1995 (ABC) Al Michaels, Frank Gifford, Dan Dierdorf
- 1996 (ABC) Al Michaels, Frank Gifford, Dan Dierdorf
- 1997 (ABC) Al Michaels, Frank Gifford, Dan Dierdorf
- 1998 (ABC) Al Michaels, Dan Dierdorf, Boomer Esiason
- 1999 (ABC) Al Michaels, Boomer Esiason

=== 2000s ===
- 2000 (ABC) Al Michaels, Dan Fouts, Dennis Miller
- 2001 (ABC) Al Michaels, Dan Fouts, Dennis Miller
- 2002 (ABC) Al Michaels, John Madden
- 2003 (ABC) Al Michaels, John Madden
- 2004 (ABC) Al Michaels, John Madden
- 2005 (ABC) Al Michaels, John Madden
- 2006 (NBC) Al Michaels, John Madden
- 2007 (NFL Network) Bryant Gumbel, Cris Collinsworth
- 2008 (NBC) Al Michaels, John Madden, Adam Schefter
- 2009 (NBC) Al Michaels, Cris Collinsworth, Andrea Kremer

=== 2010s ===
- 2010 (NBC) Al Michaels, Cris Collinsworth, Andrea Kremer
- 2012 (NFL Network) Brad Nessler, Mike Mayock, Stacey Dales
- 2013 (NBC) Al Michaels, Cris Collinsworth, Michele Tafoya
- 2014 (NBC) Al Michaels, Cris Collinsworth, Michele Tafoya
- 2015 (NBC) Al Michaels, Cris Collinsworth, Paul Burmeister
- 2017 (NBC) Al Michaels, Cris Collinsworth, Tony Dungy (4th quarter only), Michele Tafoya
- 2018 (NBC) Al Michaels, Cris Collinsworth, Michele Tafoya
- 2019 (NBC) Al Michaels, Cris Collinsworth, Tony Dungy (2nd half only), Michele Tafoya

=== 2020s ===
- 2021 (Fox) Joe Buck, Troy Aikman, Erin Andrews, and Tom Rinaldi
- 2022 (NBC) Mike Tirico, Cris Collinsworth, and Melissa Stark
- 2023 (NBC) Mike Tirico, Cris Collinsworth, and Melissa Stark
- 2024 (ABC/ESPN) Joe Buck, Troy Aikman, Lisa Salters, and Laura Rutledge
- 2025 (NBC) Mike Tirico, Cris Collinsworth, Brent Musburger (3rd quarter only) and Melissa Stark
- 2026 (NBC) Mike Tirico, Cris Collinsworth, and Melissa Stark

== Game results ==
NOTE: No overtime up to 1973 and since 2021.

Season	Date	Designated visiting team		Designated home team		Notes
1962	August 11	New York Giants	21	St. Louis Cardinals	21	Recap
1963	September 8	Cleveland Browns	7	Pittsburgh Steelers	16	Recap
1964	September 6	Baltimore Colts	48	Pittsburgh Steelers	17	Recap
1965	September 12	Detroit Lions	3	Washington Redskins	20	Recap
1967	August 5	Cleveland Browns	13	Philadelphia Eagles	28	Recap
1968	August 3	Dallas Cowboys	24	Chicago Bears	30	Recap
1969	September 13	Green Bay Packers	38	Atlanta Falcons	24	Recap
1970	August 8	New Orleans Saints	14	Minnesota Vikings	13	Recap
1971	July 31	Houston Oilers	6	Los Angeles Rams	17	Recap
1972	July 29	Kansas City Chiefs	23	New York Giants	17	Recap
1973	July 28	San Francisco 49ers	20	New England Patriots	7	Recap
1974	July 27	Buffalo Bills	13	St. Louis Cardinals	21	Recap
1975	August 2	Washington Redskins	17	Cincinnati Bengals	9	Recap
1976	July 24	Denver Broncos	10	Detroit Lions	7	Recap
1977	July 30	Chicago Bears	20	New York Jets	6	Recap
1978	July 29	Miami Dolphins	3	Philadelphia Eagles	17	Recap
1979	July 28	Dallas Cowboys	13	Oakland Raiders	20	Recap
1980	August 2	San Diego Chargers	0	Green Bay Packers	0	Recap (Note: The 1980 game was called with 5:29 remaining in the fourth quarter due to lightning.)
1981	August 1	Atlanta Falcons	10	Cleveland Browns	24	Recap
1982	August 7	Baltimore Colts	14	Minnesota Vikings	30	Recap
1983	July 30	New Orleans Saints	14	Pittsburgh Steelers	27	Recap
1984	July 28	Seattle Seahawks	38	Tampa Bay Buccaneers	0	Recap
1985	August 3	New York Giants	21	Houston Oilers	20	Recap
1986	August 2	New England Patriots	21	St. Louis Cardinals	16	Recap
1987	August 8	San Francisco 49ers	20	Kansas City Chiefs	7	Recap
1988	July 30	Cincinnati Bengals	14	Los Angeles Rams	7	Recap
1989	August 5	Washington Redskins	31	Buffalo Bills	6	Recap
1990	August 4	Cleveland Browns	0	Chicago Bears	13	Recap
1991	July 27	Detroit Lions	14	Denver Broncos	3	Recap
1992	August 1	New York Jets	41	Philadelphia Eagles	14	Recap
1993	July 31	Green Bay Packers	3	Los Angeles Raiders	19	Recap
1994	July 30	San Diego Chargers	17	Atlanta Falcons	21	Recap
1995	July 29	Carolina Panthers	20	Jacksonville Jaguars	14	Recap
1996	July 27	Indianapolis Colts	10	New Orleans Saints	3	Recap
1997	July 26	Minnesota Vikings	28	Seattle Seahawks	26	Recap
1998	August 1	Pittsburgh Steelers	6	Tampa Bay Buccaneers	30	Recap
1999	August 9	Dallas Cowboys	17	Cleveland Browns	20	Recap
2000	July 31	New England Patriots	20	San Francisco 49ers	0	Recap
2001	August 6	St. Louis Rams	17	Miami Dolphins	10	Recap
2002	August 5	Houston Texans	17	New York Giants	34	Recap
2003	August 4	Green Bay Packers	0	Kansas City Chiefs	9	Recap (Note: The 2003 game was called with 5:49 remaining in the third quarter due to lightning.)
2004	August 9	Denver Broncos	17	Washington Redskins	20	Recap
2005	August 8	Chicago Bears	27	Miami Dolphins	24	Recap
2006	August 6	Oakland Raiders	16	Philadelphia Eagles	10	Recap
2007	August 5	New Orleans Saints	7	Pittsburgh Steelers	20	Recap (Note: The 2007 game was simulcast locally on WGNO in New Orleans and KDKA-TV in Pittsburgh.)
2008	August 3	Indianapolis Colts	16	Washington Redskins	30	Recap
2009	August 9	Buffalo Bills	18	Tennessee Titans	21	Recap
2010	August 8	Dallas Cowboys	16	Cincinnati Bengals	7	Recap
2011	August 7	Chicago Bears	—	St. Louis Rams	—	Ref. (Note: The 2011 game was scheduled to be between the St. Louis Rams and the Chicago Bears, but was canceled due to the NFL lockout.)
2012	August 5	Arizona Cardinals	10	New Orleans Saints	17	Recap (Note: The 2012 game was simulcast locally on KPHO-TV in Phoenix and WVUE-DT in New Orleans.)
2013	August 4	Miami Dolphins	20	Dallas Cowboys	24	Recap
2014	August 3	New York Giants	17	Buffalo Bills	13	Recap
2015	August 9	Pittsburgh Steelers	3	Minnesota Vikings	14	Recap
2016	August 7	Green Bay Packers	—	Indianapolis Colts	—	Ref. (Note: The 2016 game was scheduled to be between the Green Bay Packers and the Indianapolis Colts, but was canceled due to poor field conditions.)
2017	August 3	Arizona Cardinals	18	Dallas Cowboys	20	Recap
2018	August 2	Chicago Bears	16	Baltimore Ravens	17	Recap
2019	August 1	Denver Broncos	14	Atlanta Falcons	10	Recap
2020	August 6	Dallas Cowboys	—	Pittsburgh Steelers	—	Ref. (Note: The 2020 game was scheduled to be between the Dallas Cowboys versus the Pittsburgh Steelers, but was canceled due to the COVID-19 pandemic.)
2021	August 5	Dallas Cowboys	3	Pittsburgh Steelers	16	Recap
2022	August 4	Jacksonville Jaguars	11	Las Vegas Raiders	27	Recap
2023	August 3	New York Jets	16	Cleveland Browns	21	Recap
2024	August 1	Houston Texans	17	Chicago Bears	21	Recap (Note: The 2024 game was called with 3:31 remaining in the third quarter due to lightning and torrential rain.)
2025	July 31	Los Angeles Chargers	34	Detroit Lions	7	Recap
2026	August 6	Carolina Panthers	33	Arizona Cardinals	30	Recap

== Appearances ==
Team	GP	W	L	T	PCT	Last appearance
Pittsburgh Steelers	7	4	3	0	.571	2021
Dallas Cowboys	7	3	4	0	.429	2021
Chicago Bears	6	5	1	0	.833	2024
Cleveland Browns	6	3	3	0	.500	2023
Arizona/St. Louis Cardinals	6	1	4	1	.250	2026
Washington Redskins/Commanders	5	5	0	0	1.000	2008
New York Giants	5	3	1	1	.700	2014
Denver Broncos	5	3	2	0	.600	2019
New Orleans Saints	5	2	3	0	.400	2012
Atlanta Falcons	5	1	4	0	.200	2019
Las Vegas/Oakland/Los Angeles Raiders	4	4	0	0	1.000	2022
Minnesota Vikings	4	3	1	0	.750	2015
Indianapolis/Baltimore Colts	4	2	2	0	.500	2008
Philadelphia Eagles	4	2	2	0	.500	2006
Green Bay Packers	4	1	2	1	.375	2016
Detroit Lions	4	1	3	0	.250	2025
Buffalo Bills	4	0	4	0	.000	2014
Miami Dolphins	4	0	4	0	.000	2013
Kansas City Chiefs	3	2	1	0	.667	2003
Los Angeles/St. Louis Rams	3	2	1	0	.667	2001
New England Patriots	3	2	1	0	.667	2000
San Francisco 49ers	3	2	1	0	.667	2000
Los Angeles/San Diego Chargers	3	1	1	1	.500	2025
Cincinnati Bengals	3	1	2	0	.333	2010
New York Jets	3	1	2	0	.333	2023
Tennessee Titans/Houston Oilers	3	1	2	0	.333	2009
Carolina Panthers	2	2	0	0	1.000	2026
Seattle Seahawks	2	1	1	0	.500	1997
Tampa Bay Buccaneers	2	1	1	0	.500	1998
Houston Texans	2	0	2	0	.000	2024
Jacksonville Jaguars	2	0	2	0	.000	2022
Baltimore Ravens	1	1	0	0	1.000	2018

- Most appearances

- 7 – Dallas Cowboys (1968, 1979, 1999, 2010, 2013, 2017, 2021) and Pittsburgh Steelers (1963, 1964, 1983, 1998, 2007, 2015, 2021)

- Fewest appearances

- 1 – Baltimore Ravens (2018)

- Most wins

- 5 – Chicago Bears (1968, 1977, 1990, 2005, 2024) and Washington Redskins/Commanders (1965, 1975, 1989, 2004, 2008)

- Longest active streak without Hall of Fame Game appearance

- 29 seasons – Seattle Seahawks (1997)
- 28 seasons – Tampa Bay Buccaneers (1998)
- 26 seasons – New England Patriots and San Francisco 49ers (2000)
