= Lincoln East High School =

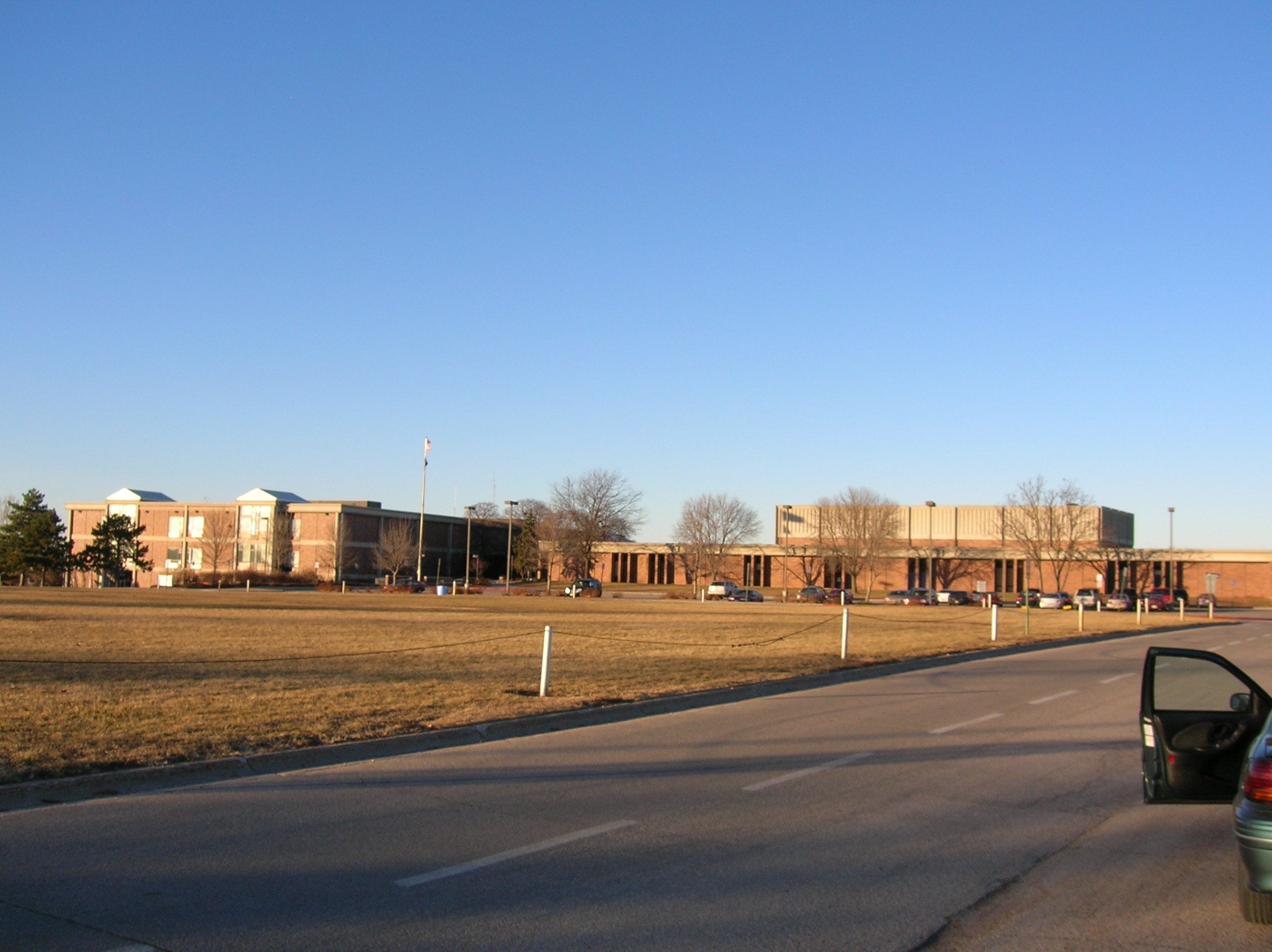

Location
- 1000 South 70th Street; Lincoln, Nebraska 68510; United States; 40°48′13″N 96°37′20″W

Information
- School type: Public high school
- Established: 1967
- Oversight: Lincoln Public Schools
- Principal: Casey Fries
- Teaching staff: 115.52 FTEs
- Enrollment: 1,982 (2024–2025)
- Student to teacher ratio: 17.16
- Color
- Mascot: Martin the Spartan
- Newspaper: The Oracle
- Website: Lincoln East H.S.

Lincoln East High School is a public high school located in Lincoln, Nebraska, United States. It is part of the Lincoln Public Schools district. The current principal is Casey Fries.

As of the 2024–25 school year, the school had an enrollment of 1,982 students and 115.52 classroom teachers (on an FTE basis), for a student–teacher ratio of 17.16:1. There were 277 students (14.0% of enrollment) eligible for free lunch and 107 (5.4% of students) eligible for reduced-cost lunch.

== History ==
Lincoln East High School opened in 1967 as the fourth high school in the Lincoln Public Schools system. A student vote resulted in the Spartan mascot and the school colors of blue and white, modeled after the flag of Greece.

== Extracurricular activities ==
=== Athletics ===
LEHS' boys basketball team won state championships in 1971,1978 and 2001. The girls' basketball team has four state championships. The boys' golf team has thirteen state championships. The girls cross country team won the NSAA Class A championship in 2018. LEHS'boys tennis team won 14 state championships in 1988, 1989, 1990, 1991, 1992, 1993, 1994, 1995, 2007, 2021, 2022, 2023, 2024, and 2025. LEHS Boys soccer won state titles in 1996, 1997, 2002, 2005, 2006 and 2010. Jeff Hoham coached the most state titles in school history with a total of 16, in a combined 3 sports -boys tennis (88, 89, 90, 91, 92, 93, 04, 05 2007. He also coached state titles in -girls tennis in 88, 90, 91 and in boys soccer in -2002, 2005 2006, and 2010.

=== Clubs ===
As of the 2026-27 school year, East High School offers 27 unique clubs. Each are listed here: American Cancer Society, Art Club/Open Studio, Asian American Pacific Islanders, Student Union, Astronomy Club, Bird Club, Chess Club, Club America, Competitive Programming Club, Creative Writing Club, DECA, Ed Rising, FBLA, Film Club, French Club, FROLF, German Club, Girl Up Club, HOSA, Interact Club, Key Club, Lincoln East Library Book Club, Magic Card Club, Math Club, Model United Nations, Poetry Club, Pride Club, Science Bowl, Science Olympiad, SkillsUSA, Spartan Catholic, Spartan Esports, Spartan Hearts, Spartan Standard, Tri-M Music, Honor Society, and Youth Revival.

=== Forensics ===
From 2002 to 2016, the Lincoln East speech team took first place each year at the annual state tournament. The team won 32 of the 45 state titles in speech since the tournament started and the 15 consecutive state championships are the most of any team in the state in any sport or activity.

=== Performing arts ===
LEHS has three competitive show choirs, the mixed-gender Express and Elevation and the female-only Elegance. The school also hosts its own competition, the Spartan Spectacular.

=== We the People ===
Lincoln East's We the People team won the Nebraska state championship in 2020 and 2022.

== Notable alumni ==
- Kirsten Bernthal Booth, head volleyball coach of Creighton University
- Aaron Bohl, college football coach and former player
- Dan Brown, blogger
- Tosca Lee, author
- Bryan Odell, former music interviewer and YouTuber
- Brandon Sanderson, author
- Eric Stokes, NFL scout and executive
- Kent Wells, former NFL player
- Rob Zatechka, former NFL player
- Mike Zentic, former NFL player
- Harley Jane Kozak, American Actress
