= Victor Simmons =

American football player (born 1964)

No. 53
- Position: Linebacker

Personal information
- Born: May 9, 1964 (age 62); Chicago, Illinois, U.S.
- Listed height: 6 ft 2 in (1.88 m)
- Listed weight: 230 lb (104 kg)

Career information
- High school: Austin (Chicago)
- College: Central State
- NFL draft: 1987: undrafted

Career history
- Dallas Cowboys (1987)

Career NFL statistics
- Games played: 3
- Stats at Pro Football Reference

Victor T. Simmons (born May 5, 1964) is an American former professional football player who was a linebacker in the National Football League (NFL). He played college football for the Central State Marauders. He was signed as a replacement player during the players strike during the 1987 season.

As a replacement player, Simmons appeared in three games, on October 4 against the New York Jets, October 11 against the Philadelphia Eagles, and lastly on October 19 against the Washington Redskins. While appearing in three games, he recorded no statistics.
