= Walter Johnson (defensive tackle, born 1965) =

American football player (born 1965)

No. 91
- Position: Defensive tackle

Personal information
- Born: September 13, 1965 (age 61); Pahokee, Florida, U.S.
- Listed height: 6 ft 1 in (1.85 m)
- Listed weight: 250 lb (113 kg)

Career information
- High school: Pahokee
- College: Pittsburgh (1983–1986)
- NFL draft: 1987: undrafted

Career history
- Dallas Cowboys (1987); Atlanta Falcons (1988)*
- * Offseason or practice squad member only

Career NFL statistics
- Games played: 1
- Sacks: 1
- Stats at Pro Football Reference

Walter Johnson (born September 13, 1965) is an American former football player. A defensive tackle, he played college football for the Pittsburgh Panthers and later one season in the National Football League (NFL) for the Dallas Cowboys. He was a replacement player signed during the 1987 NFL strike and recorded one sack in his time with the Cowboys.

== Early life ==
Walter Johnson was born on September 13, 1965, in Pahokee, Florida. He attended Pahokee High School, where he competed in football and basketball. In football, Johnson was a tight end and wide receiver on offense and a defensive lineman on defense. From his freshman year, Johnson was one of Pahokee's top receivers. As a senior in 1982, he caught 33 passes for 427 yards and four touchdowns, earning first-team all-area and class AA first-team all-state honors. Johnson placed eighth in the area in receiving yards and also was known for his run blocking abilities while at tight end. He was co-team MVP as a junior and then team MVP as a senior. Johnson participated in the 1983 Sunshine State all-star game.

At Pahokee, Johnson was also a top basketball player, leading the team to a state title as a junior while playing center and serving as co-team captain. He was second-team all-area, all-state, and all-conference as a junior and led the team with an average of 14.7 rebounds per game while also having 15.3 points per game. He led the team with 20 points in their state championship victory. As a senior, Johnson played forward and averaged over 7 points and 11 rebounds per game. He helped Pahokee return to the state title game and made a game-winning, buzzer-beater shot to defeat Jefferson County High School 71–70 in triple overtime. He signed to play college football for the Pittsburgh Panthers. Johnson cited Rickey Jackson as playing a role in him joining the Panthers. Jackson, a linebacker, also lived in Pahokee, played at Pahokee High School and in college for Pittsburgh, and went on to have a career in the NFL leading to induction to the Pro Football Hall of Fame.

== College career ==
Upon joining the Pittsburgh Panthers in 1983, Johnson initially became a linebacker. He received varsity letters all four years he attended. At the start of the 1983 season, he was the third-string nose guard. Johnson was a member of a Panthers team that went 8–3–1 and appeared in the 1984 Fiesta Bowl. The following year, Johnson won a starting role at left defensive tackle, as Pittsburgh compiled a record of 3–7–1. He improved in 1985 and recorded four sacks in the first five games, including two in a win against the South Carolina Gamecocks. His defensive line coach, Sal Sunseri, compared him to Rickey Jackson and said "I feel he is a great run guy. He's big and tough. You can't move him. He's 6 feet 3 inches (1.91 m) and he bench presses over 400 pounds (180 kg). He should be a good pass rusher because of his strength and speed." The 1985 Panthers posted a record of 5–5–1. Johnson remained a starter as a senior in 1986 and placed sixth on the team with 88 tackles, including 43 solo, along with five sacks and a fumble recovery. In his last year, the Panthers again had a 5–5–1 record. While at Pittsburgh, Johnson majored in criminal justice.

== Professional career ==
Johnson was not selected in the 1987 NFL draft. On September 23, 1987, after the NFL Players Association went on strike, Johnson was signed by the Dallas Cowboys as a replacement player. He appeared in the team's first game during the strike, a 38–24 win against the New York Jets, and posted a sack. He did not make any further appearances for the Cowboys and was released on October 21, at the end of the strike. On February 21, 1988, Johnson signed with the Atlanta Falcons, but he was released before the regular season, ending his professional career. He concluded his NFL career with one game played and one sack.
