= Anthony Coleman (American football) =

American football player (born 1964)

No. 41
- Position: Safety

Personal information
- Born: August 20, 1964 (age 62); Henderson, Texas, U.S.
- Listed height: 6 ft 0 in (1.83 m)
- Listed weight: 185 lb (84 kg)

Career information
- High school: Lufkin (Lufkin, Texas)
- College: Baylor (1982–1986)
- NFL draft: 1987: undrafted

Career history
- Dallas Cowboys (1987)

Career NFL statistics
- Games played: 3
- Stats at Pro Football Reference

Anthony Quinn Coleman (born August 20, 1964) is an American former professional football player who was a safety in the National Football League (NFL). He played college football for the Baylor Bears. He was signed as a replacement player during the players strike during the 1987 season.

As a replacement player, Coleman appeared in three games, on October 4 against the New York Jets, October 11 against the Philadelphia Eagles, and lastly on October 19 against the Washington Redskins. While appearing in three games, he recorded no statistics.
