= Ray Perkins (defensive end) =

American football player (born 1964)

No. 92
- Position: Defensive end

Personal information
- Born: September 25, 1964 (age 62); Richmond, Virginia, U.S.
- Listed height: 6 ft 5 in (1.96 m)
- Listed weight: 242 lb (110 kg)

Career information
- High school: Marshall-Walker (VA)
- College: Virginia
- NFL draft: 1987: undrafted

Career history
- Dallas Cowboys (1987); Edmonton Eskimos (1988)*; Cleveland Browns (1989)*; Arizona Cardinals (1990)*
- * Offseason or practice squad member only

Career NFL statistics
- Sacks: 2
- Stats at Pro Football Reference

Rayotis Perkins (born September 25, 1964) is an American former professional football player who was a defensive end in the National Football League (NFL) for the Dallas Cowboys. He played college football for the Virginia Cavaliers.

== Early life ==
Perkins attended Marshall-Walker High School. He didn't start playing football until his sophomore season. He accepted a scholarship from the University of Virginia.

He played as a defensive tackle. As a senior, he had 2 forced fumbles against the University of South Carolina.

== Professional career ==
=== Dallas Cowboys ===
Perkins was signed as an undrafted free agent by the Dallas Cowboys after the 1987 NFL draft. He was switched to defensive end during training camp. He was waived on September 7.

After the NFLPA strike was declared on the third week of the 1987 season, those contests were canceled (reducing the 16 game season to 15) and the NFL decided that the games would be played with replacement players. In September, he was re-signed to be a part of the Dallas Cowboys replacement team that was given the mock name "Rhinestone Cowboys" by the media. He started at right defensive end against the New York Jets and collected 2 sacks. He was a backup defensive end against the Philadelphia Eagles. He did not play against the Washington Redskins. He was released on October 20, after the strike ended.

=== Edmonton Eskimos ===
In 1988, he signed with the Edmonton Eskimos of the Canadian Football League. On July 6, he was released before the start of the season.

=== Cleveland Browns ===
In 1989, he signed as a free agent with the Cleveland Browns. On July 5, he was released before the start of the season.

== Personal life ==
Before working as an assistant principal, he was an assistant coach and speaker for Phoenix Christian Highschool. Perkins now works as the assistant principal of athletics, activities and facilities at Tolleson Union High School.
