= Mike Zentic =

American football player (born 1963)

No. 62
- Position: Center

Personal information
- Born: November 22, 1963 (age 62); Tecumseh, Nebraska, U.S.
- Listed height: 6 ft 3 in (1.91 m)
- Listed weight: 255 lb (116 kg)

Career information
- High school: Lincoln East (Lincoln, Nebraska)
- College: NW Missouri State; Oklahoma State
- NFL draft: 1987: undrafted

Career history
- Dallas Cowboys (1987); Kansas City Chiefs (1988)*
- * Offseason or practice squad member only

Career NFL statistics
- Games played: 3
- Games started: 3
- Stats at Pro Football Reference

Michael Lee Zentic (born November 22, 1963) is an American former professional football player who was a center in the National Football League (NFL) for the Dallas Cowboys. He played college football for the Oklahoma State Cowboys.

== Early life ==
Zentic attended Lincoln East High School, where he was coached in football by his father Lee. He received All-conference honors as a senior. He enrolled at Division II Northwest Missouri State University, where he was named a starter at center.

He transferred to Oklahoma State University after his third year. As a senior, he was named the starter at offensive tackle in the fifth game of the season against Nebraska, after not being able to beat Tony Wilkins for the starting center position.

== Professional career ==
=== Dallas Cowboys ===
Zentic was signed as an undrafted free agent by the Dallas Cowboys after the 1987 NFL draft. He was waived on September 1.

After the NFLPA strike was declared on the third week of the 1987 season, those contests were canceled (reducing the 16 game season to 15) and the NFL decided that the games would be played with replacement players. He was re-signed to be a part of the Dallas replacement team that was given the mock name "Rhinestone Cowboys" by the media. He started 3 games at center. He was cut on October 20, at the end of the strike.

=== Kansas City Chiefs ===
On July 11, 1988, he was signed as a free agent by the Kansas City Chiefs. He was released on August 22.
