= NFL preseason =

Series of exhibition games before the NFL regular season

The National Football League preseason is the period each year during which NFL teams play several friendly exhibition games before the regular season starts. Beginning with the featured Pro Football Hall of Fame game in early August, three weekends of exhibition games are played in the NFL to date. The start of the preseason is intrinsically tied to the last week of training camp.

== History ==
Exhibition games have been played in professional football since the beginning of the sport. In fact, until league play was formalized in 1920, one could consider virtually all of an independent professional football team's schedule to be exhibitions (as in test matches). In the early years of the sport, teams often "barnstormed", and played squads from leagues outside their own, or against local college teams or other amateur groups, charging fans whatever the traffic would bear.

When the NFL was founded in 1920, all games counted in the standings and would be used to determine the league champion. In 1921, this was revised to only count games involving two league members, thus allowing non-league exhibitions, but effectively banning exhibitions between two league teams. This rule had a direct impact on deciding the 1921 championship, in which the losing team insisted that the deciding game only be considered an exhibition.

In 1924, the league again changed the rule to declare any games held in December or later to be exhibitions. By the mid-1930s, teams prepared for a standard 12-game regular season schedule, although even as late as 1939 teams would schedule non-league exhibition games both before and during the season (during bye weeks). The Pittsburgh Steelers (then known as the Pirates) were well known for playing both in the NFL and on a limited schedule in the decades-old Western Pennsylvania circuit in the 1930s.

In the 1960s, teams began playing 14 regular season games, with a corresponding decrease in the length of the preseason. Teams played four or five preseason games each year; for example, in 1966 each of the nine American Football League teams each played four preseason games. By the end of the decade, however, there would be a rapid increase in the number of preseason games.

With the AFL–NFL merger of 1970, the newly merged NFL was granted a Sherman Anti-Trust Act exemption, which emboldened some team owners to expand the exhibition schedule and to require season-ticket holders to pay for one, then two, then three home exhibition games if they wanted to keep their season tickets.

From 1970 through 1977, the NFL season consisted of 14 regular season games and six exhibition games, sometimes but not always three at home and three away (the 1974 Washington Redskins, for instance, played all but one of six preseason games at home), with some played at neutral sites. From 1978 to 2019, the regular season was lengthened to 16 games, and the exhibition season was cut from six to four games.

From 1999 to 2001, when the league consisted of an uneven 31 teams, some additional exhibition games (usually two or three) were played over Hall of Fame weekend. In order to account for the uneven number of teams, each team was required to have a bye week during the exhibition season. Most teams held their bye week in Hall of Fame weekend, while the others utilized them somewhere else during the exhibition season. This practice was abandoned after the Houston Texans were added to the league in 2002, giving it an even 32 teams.

The 2020 preseason was cancelled due to the COVID-19 pandemic.

In 2021, a rule change was enacted that abolished overtime in preseason games, the first time since 1973. Additionally, with the expansion of the regular season to seventeen games and eighteen weeks, the preseason was reduced to three games (though the teams that play in the Pro Football Hall of Fame Game still play 4 preseason games). That same year, the Baltimore Ravens and John Harbaugh claimed the record of consecutive preseason wins with 20, overtaking Vince Lombardi’s Green Bay Packers record.

== Scheduling ==
Unlike the regular season, the exhibition matchups are not based on any rotating or set formula.

The NFL schedules the matchups for all of the exhibition games. Since 2002, individual teams have been allowed to negotiate their own deals to play each other during the preseason: the league allows individual teams to provide input into desired matchups and determines the matchups for any games that were not individually negotiated, while the league sets all game dates and times.

The exhibition season schedule is released in the spring, shortly before the regular season schedule is announced. The NFL has set a loose precedent of determining exhibition matchups:

- No two teams have faced each other in the same exhibition season more than once since 2001, when Dallas and Oakland played twice.
- No NFL team has played any team outside the league since 1976.
- Teams in the same division usually do not play one another during the exhibition season: the last intra-division preseason matchup occurred in 2000.
- Interconference game (AFC vs. NFC) matchups are common and encouraged, since regular season matchups between interconference teams are infrequent, with teams generally playing other-conference teams only once every four years during the regular season. These games allow teams to travel to particular markets more frequently than normal, and represent "fresh" matchups.
- Geographically close matchups are preferred, to provide teams with minimal (if possible) exhibition season travel. As such, intrastate rivals are frequent matchups, provided they are not already division foes: Giants/Jets (the MetLife Bowl), Ravens/Commanders (Battle of the Beltways), Bucs/Dolphins/Jaguars, and Chargers/Rams (Battle for Los Angeles) are all frequent exhibition matchups. The Broncos and Cardinals, the only two teams in the Mountain Time Zone, also play every preseason (though due to Arizona's non-observance of daylight saving time, Denver is one hour ahead of Arizona during the NFL preseason, which occurs in August). The Eagles and Jets have concluded the preseason by playing each other annually since 2001, due to close proximity.
- Teams with close personal ties often play each other.
  - Since 2005, the Giants and the Patriots close out their preseason together, as the owners of the two teams are friends.
  - The Steelers and the Panthers, from 2003 to 2021, closed out their preseason together despite a 450 mi (724.2 km) distance between Pittsburgh and Charlotte. There are numerous Pittsburgh-area ties to the Panthers organization, including former head coach John Fox (a former assistant at Pitt and the Steelers), ex-Steeler linebackers Greg Lloyd and Kevin Greene finishing out their careers at Carolina, former Steelers safety Donnie Shell having served as the Panthers Director of Player Development from 1994 to 2009, and former Steelers minority owner & East Liberty native David Tepper becoming majority owner of the Panthers. On the flip side, former Steelers head coach Bill Cowher attended N.C. State and moved to Raleigh for a time after retirement. Former Steelers players Willie Parker and Jeff Reed both attended UNC. This also reflects on the increasing number of western Pennsylvania natives in relocating to the Carolinas. Their preseason matchups have decreased since the increase in regular season games to 17, though they did resume meeting in the preseason in 2025.
  - The Buffalo Bills and Detroit Lions often play each other in the preseason, as a tribute to late Bills owner Ralph Wilson, who was a native of Detroit, and at one point owned a share of the Lions. In addition, both Buffalo and Detroit are the only NFL cities that border Canada, with each city located on opposite sides of Southern Ontario.
- Along with general in-state rivalries, some long-established "Governor's Cups" are played annually.
  - Texas – Dallas Cowboys vs. Houston Texans (since 2002, Cowboys vs. Houston Oilers from 1967 to 1996)
  - Pennsylvania – Philadelphia Eagles vs. Pittsburgh Steelers
  - Missouri – Kansas City vs. St. Louis (currently suspended due to a lack of a team in St. Louis: Chiefs vs. Cardinals from 1970 to 1987 and Chiefs vs. Rams from 1995 to 2015)
- After the division realignment in 2002, the NFL factors in former division rivalries which were broken due to teams moving to different divisions if possible. For a five-year period from 2002 to 2006, the league had the authority to schedule former division rivals for exhibition games (the Cardinals and Seattle Seahawks, who were switched from the NFC East and AFC West, respectively, to the NFC West, are the most notable examples). It was a move intended to recover potentially lost revenue due to the end of a popular annual rivalry game. In some rare cases, the league has scheduled "hot" regular-season matchups if they did not happen to be scheduled to play that season. For instance, Tampa Bay and St. Louis had a popular mini-rivalry from 1999 to 2004. The teams were not scheduled to play one another in 2003, so the league reacted by scheduling a Monday night preseason game for them that season.
  - The Tennessee Titans and Pittsburgh Steelers are former division rivals in the old AFC Central. 2018 was the first time the two teams met in the preseason since the Titans became a member of the AFC South and the Steelers became a member of the AFC North.
  - The Detroit Lions and Tampa Bay Buccaneers are former division rivals in the old NFC Central. 2018 was the first time the two teams met in the preseason since the Lions became a member of the NFC North and the Buccaneers became a member of the NFC South.
  - The Seattle Seahawks and Green Bay Packers got scheduled to play each other in the 2013 preseason in a rematch of Fail Mary. Both teams were not scheduled to play each other in the 2013 regular season.
- Teams that have joint practices together get scheduled to play each other in a preseason game.

The teams that play in the Pro Football Hall of Fame Game are determined solely by the league (and the Hall of Fame committee), featuring one AFC team and one NFC team. Its matchup is announced well in advance, around the time of the Super Bowl, when the Hall of Fame inductees are announced. Under some circumstances, the matchup is planned well into the future. For example, the Buccaneers played the Steelers in the 1998 Hall of Fame Game, a matchup that had been announced in 1983. In recent times, if there has been an expansion team added to the league, that team will be invited to play in the Hall of Fame game (Carolina, Jacksonville, the new Cleveland Browns, and Houston all played in their expansion seasons in 1995, 1999, and 2002 respectively). The 2009 game, however, was between two original American Football League teams: the Buffalo Bills and the Tennessee Titans (formerly the Houston Oilers). This matchup was announced after Ralph C. Wilson, Jr., an AFL founder and the only owner ever of the Bills, was inducted to the Pro Football Hall of Fame on February 1, 2009, while the late Titans' owner, Bud Adams, was also the only owner his team had to that time. Wilson and Adams were also the two last surviving members of the original AFL ownership cabal and are two of the only three men who have majority-owned a professional football franchise continuously for fifty years or more (the late George Halas, who owned the Chicago Bears from 1920 to 1983, is the third). The Hall of Fame game served as a kickoff to the 2009 season, which would have been the 50th season of play for the AFL had it survived as an independent entity. The 2011 (canceled), 2012, 2016 (canceled), and 2026 games were between two NFC teams. Normally, the Pro Football Hall of Fame Game has an AFC and NFC matchup, but that is not always the case.

Before the 1970 AFL–NFL merger, it was common for teams to play each other twice in the same pre-season. Among the most recent occurrences were in 1992 when the Dallas Cowboys and Houston Oilers played on August 1 in Tokyo, then again on August 15, in Dallas, and in a more recent season, the Buccaneers and the Dolphins played each other twice in one preseason. To this day, although multiple preseason games against the same two teams are no longer common, two teams may hold a joint practice and scrimmage in addition to a preseason contest (see, for example, the Buffalo Bills and Pittsburgh Steelers in 2014). It is still somewhat common to see teams that play each other during the regular season once play a preseason game (either the two teams split in playing at the other's home stadium, or the two teams play at one of the other's home both times); the majority of preseason contests each year are between teams that do not play each other in the regular season that year.

It was also commonplace for division opponents to play each other in the preseason, due to the larger size of pre-merger divisions, but has not happened since 2000, when the Seattle Seahawks played the Oakland Raiders.

As recently as 1984, the Cleveland Browns and Pittsburgh Steelers played a preseason game despite the two being bitter rivals. In 1999 the San Diego Chargers played their division rivals the Denver Broncos and Kansas City Chiefs in the preseason. In 1988 the Chicago Bears and Minnesota Vikings traveled to Gothenberg (Göteberg), Sweden https://www.upi.com/Archives/1988/08/10/When-the-Chicago-Bears-and-the-Minesota-Vikings-arrived/2550587188800/ to play in the "Scandinavian Skirmish" televised on CBS with commentators Verne Lundquist and Terry Bradshaw. Lundquist (Lundqvist) is an ornamental Swedish surname meaning "grove" and "twig".

Since the league realignment in 2002, when the NFL expanded to 32 teams, teams more than two time zones apart normally do not play each other, to save teams from long traveling times. However, there have been some exceptions.

=== Non-league opponents ===
The College All-Star Game, usually the first game of the preseason, was played annually in Chicago from 1934 to 1976 (except 1974), and featured the NFL (from 1966 World) champion against an all-rookie team of college all-stars.

Between 1950 and 1961, the NFL also played exhibition matches against teams from Interprovincial Rugby Football Union, which became the eastern section of Canadian Football League in 1958. These games used a mix of U.S. and Canadian rules. NFL preseason games against Canadian opposition were abandoned after the 1961 preseason. While this was, in part because the NFL won all six matchups, an additional factor was that the CFL gradually moved up the start of its regular season so that it overlapped the NFL preseason (today, the CFL regular season typically starts in early summer, before NFL training camps even open). The CFL did win a game against American opposition in August 1961, but this was against an American Football League team; as a result of the perceived embarrassment, the AFL opted not to play the CFL again beyond that one game.

A number of factors precluded the NFL from playing the western section of the CFL (formerly the Western Interprovincial Football Union). For decades, the WIFU was seen especially in Eastern Canada as an inferior competition to the IRFU; however, even without this, preseason play between the NFL and Western Canadian teams was considered as impractical because, even at this time, the Western Canadian regular season started much earlier than other professional leagues including the IRFU: further, the travel distances between NFL cities and Western Canadian cities in an era when professional sports teams still traveled mostly by rail was another obstacle. (The American Football League of 1940 and 1941, one of the recognized major competitors to the NFL, did play at least one game against a WIFU opponent, when the AFL champion Columbus Bullies took on WIFU champion Winnipeg Blue Bombers in a three-game series in 1941.) It was not until 1961 that the NFL had a team in any city reasonably close by rail to any Western CFL city, and as previously mentioned, that was the last year of CFL-NFL interleague play.

From 1967 to 1969, during the transition period leading up to the formal AFL–NFL merger, the NFL and American Football League played each other in a series of exhibition matches; notably, the 1969 match between the Buffalo Bills and Washington Redskins was the only time Vince Lombardi ever lost to an AFL team. However, it could be argued that these were not truly interleague contests, since the NFL had already agreed to recognize the AFL's history as part of its own and include AFL teams in a "common draft" with those already in the NFL, while the AFL was already under the authority of the NFL Commissioner by this point. The 1968 games were played under an experimental rule that eliminated extra point kicks and required a play from scrimmage to score one point (this rule was later implemented by the World Football League in 1974, and the XFL in 2001).

Games against non-league opponents were occasionally played after that time, usually with the NFL teams sending a rookie "split squad" to the game. In 1969, the Atlanta Falcons rookies defeated the Alabama Hawks of the Continental Football League 55–0, and in 1972, the New York Jets rookies defeated the Long Island Chiefs of the Seaboard Football League 29–3. In 1974, the Houston Oilers rookies narrowly defeated the San Antonio Toros 13–7.

The 1976 All-Star Classic is the last game between an NFL team and a non-NFL team as of 2025. This is in contrast to current practice in MLS, NBA and NHL, and recent practice in baseball, in which teams play exhibition games against non-league teams.

=== Schedule ===
The exhibition season typically begins the first weekend of August with the Hall of Fame Game; though in some years it can be on the second weekend. Previous seasons have seen the American Bowl game held the last weekend of July. The first full schedule of exhibition games is held the following weekend. Most games are held on Thursday, Friday, or Saturday nights, with one nationally televised game each night of the week: NFL Network airs any night that no other national TV providers will air a game, CBS airs a Friday night game, Fox airs a Sunday night game (not the same night as NBC), NBC with the opening Thursday night game, and ESPN a Monday night game on the same week. Unlike the regular season, CBS's and Fox's national exhibition game opponents are selected regardless of conference. Three full weekends of games are held, followed by a league-wide bye week over Labor Day weekend.

There is usually a conflict with the Major League Baseball season, a situation seen in the 2015 preseason when the Pittsburgh Steelers moved a Sunday evening game against the Green Bay Packers at Heinz Field to a traditional 1 p.m. kickoff to avoid parking conflicts with the Pittsburgh Pirates across their shared lot at PNC Park, when the Pirates had a game moved to Sunday evening as part of ESPN's Sunday Night Baseball. In 2025, an NFL-MLB conflict arose on Saturday, August 23 when the Tampa Bay Buccaneers were scheduled to host the Buffalo Bills and the Tampa Bay Rays were to host the St. Louis Cardinals. Since the Buccaneers' Raymond James Stadium and George M. Steinbrenner Field, which was hosting the Rays for 2025 due to severe damage at their normal home, Tropicana Field in St. Petersburg, caused by Hurricane Milton the previous October, share parking lots, the Rays and Cardinals agreed to a rare Saturday off-day, playing the three-game series Thursday, Friday and Sunday.

On different occasions, severe weather or other factors, have postponed or outright cancelled some preseason games. Due to their exhibition nature, suspended or cancelled preseason games are normally never made up. In 2004, Hurricane Charley postponed a Tampa Bay game against Cincinnati from Saturday until Monday. In 2001, a preseason game between Philadelphia and Baltimore was cancelled due to turf problems at Veterans Stadium. Similar turf concerns prompted the league to cancel the 2016 Hall of Fame Game at the last minute. The 2017 Cowboys-Texans preseason game, originally scheduled for Houston, was at first switched to Arlington due to the flooding spawned by Hurricane Harvey in southeast Texas. The day before the scheduled game, it was cancelled to allow the Texans, who departed Houston the previous Friday to play at New Orleans and then were diverted to Dallas/Fort Worth International Airport after the Saints game, to return to Houston to be with their families. A 2021 exhibition between the Arizona Cardinals and New Orleans Saints was cancelled when Hurricane Ida was forecast to make landfall near New Orleans the day after the scheduled match. Damage and power outages wrought by Ida forced the Saints to move their regular season opener vs. the Green Bay Packers from New Orleans to Jacksonville.

== International and neutral-site games ==
Prior to the commencement of the NFL International Series, the NFL had another "featured" exhibition game called the American Bowl. This matchup was an extra exhibition game for the two teams involved and was often played on the same weekend as the Hall of Fame Game. It was played outside the United States, usually in Mexico or Japan. The American Bowl was held from 1986 to 2005; similar international matches had occurred regularly since 1969.

In addition, teams previously played home games at stadiums on the fringes of their markets or in markets not currently served by NFL teams. The Alamodome in San Antonio hosted games in this fashion, as did Rogers Centre (as part of the Bills Toronto Series), with Camp Randall Stadium, the on-campus home of Wisconsin Badgers football in Madison, Wisconsin, hosting one preseason Green Bay Packers game per year until the late 1990s. The Citrus Bowl was previously a common venue for games. The Carrier Dome in Syracuse, New York has been mentioned as a potential site for such a game, with the host team not yet mentioned.

In June 2019, the Green Bay Packers and Oakland Raiders announced that they would play a preseason game at Investors Group Field in Winnipeg, Manitoba, home of the Canadian Football League's Winnipeg Blue Bombers, on August 22, 2019. The game was originally proposed for Regina, Saskatchewan's Mosaic Stadium, but its CFL tenant rejected the proposal, fearing that they couldn't convert the field back to its Canadian football configuration (which uses a longer field than the NFL) in time for a game the next day. Due to the anchor points for the regular Canadian goalposts being within the NFL field and the concrete pad covering it being deemed a safety hazard by the teams, it was decided near game time to play the game on a reduced 80-yard field without kickoffs, making the 10 yard-line the actual goal line for the game (though field goals and PAT attempts were still allowed).

Also in 2019, the Dallas Cowboys and Los Angeles Rams announced that they would play a preseason game at Aloha Stadium in Hawaii on August 17, which would be the last NFL game held at the constant site for the Pro Bowl until the 2016 edition, as the stadium would be condemned at the end of 2020.

== Television and radio ==
While selected preseason games are televised nationally by the NFL's main broadcast partners (including, most prominently, the Hall of Fame Game, which has been part of NBC's Sunday Night Football package outside of Summer Olympics years — where the game is usually aired by Fox, NFL Network and most recently ESPN/ABC due to NBC's coverage of the Games), the majority of them are in-house productions of the individual teams, often in association with a local television broadcaster, regional sports network, or an outside producer such as Raycom Sports. Especially if a team's flagship station is affiliated with or owned by one of the NFL's network partners, rightsholders may also subcontract with their respective sports department or co-owned regional sports networks, such as CBS Sports (in the case of the Atlanta Falcons, whose flagship is CBS-owned independent WUPA), Fox Sports Networks (in the case of the Detroit Lions, whose games are aired by WJBK and produced by former sister network Bally Sports Detroit), or NBC Sports (in the case of the New York Giants, whose games are aired by WNBC) to provide resources such as camera crews and graphics, or produce the entire broadcast, giving those networks their own ability to evaluate their production teams and the chemistry of network announcing teams before the season starts.

Preseason broadcasts are typically syndicated to a network of stations within the team's market region, which also typically includes a package of team-produced programming throughout the season (such as analysis and coach's shows), local rights to games broadcast on cable, and the right to brand themselves as the "official" station of the team in the market.

Exhibition games are almost exclusively played at night due to hot summer weather, and are frequently scheduled based on local convenience. When applicable, the NFL blackout restrictions apply, although stations are allowed to play the game on a tape delay if the game does not sell out (unlike the regular season policy, when rights revert to NFL Films). However, the blackout restrictions have never been applied since 2015 as a result of a passed vote during the league's owners' meeting in March in which the league, as an experiment because no regular season games in the 2014 season were blacked out and an FCC vote in September 2014 to no longer enforce blackouts, eliminated blackout rules for at least the last two seasons. Many more exhibition games fail to sell out than do regular-season games.

Since 2015, Compass Media Networks carries select preseason contests involving the Las Vegas Raiders and Dallas Cowboys nationwide.

== Criticism ==
Currently, every NFL team requires its season ticket holders to purchase tickets at full price for two exhibition games as a requirement to purchase regular-season tickets. Complaints regarding this policy have gone all the way to the U.S. Supreme Court, but have failed to change the policy. A judgment in 1974 stated: "No fewer than five lawsuits have been instituted from Dallas to New England, each claiming that the respective National Football League (NFL) team had violated the Sherman Act by requiring an individual who wishes to purchase a season ticket for all regular season games to buy, in addition, tickets for one or more exhibition or preseason games."

Additionally, some players, coaches, and journalists, and numerous fans, objected to the four-week exhibition schedule. Players have little monetary incentive to play in exhibitions, since they are paid only a training-camp per diem for these games, as their salaries are not paid until the regular season; thus, they are essentially playing in exhibitions "for free". Regardless of these objections, owners continued to endorse the four-game exhibition season.

Coaches often do not play their starters in the preseason. Most notably Sean McVay has elected to not play any starter at all in the preseason since his first head coaching season in 2017, and since then other teams have followed suit. Instead of preseason games for starters, teams will choose to schedule joint practices where first-team players can play against other first-team players in a controlled environment. Preseason games are thus used for players who are on the "bubble" of making the team, as teams are allowed to carry 90 players through training camp and the preseason, but only 53 afterward. Preseason games are more likely to feature rote plays and not the full playbook, especially for the offense, to avoid tipping the hand of future regular season opponents.

The games are an easy source of revenue, and thus are unlikely to be dispensed with in the foreseeable future.

=== Proposed reductions and 2021 changes ===
In 2008, NFL commissioner Roger Goodell raised the possibility of shortening the exhibition season, in favor of lengthening the regular season.

There was a possibility that by 2012, the league would switch to two primary exhibition games (down from four) and an 18-game regular season (up from 16). Reasons cited were solutions to future labor concerns about revenue, and the overall dissatisfaction with the exhibitions among players and fans. Also, since the NFL is now widely considered a competitive year-round business, veteran players normally train and condition year round, and do not need the extensive exhibition season to get back into playing shape after the previous regular season. This proposal was eventually rejected in negotiations for the NFL Collective Bargaining Agreement, due to objections and concerns over fatigue and injuries raised by the National Football League Players Association.

Another proposal said to be gaining "growing sentiment among NFL owners" as of 2016 is a proposal to eliminate the last preseason game and give a league-wide bye week leading into the regular season.

In 2021, the NFL Competition Committee voted to extend the regular season to 17 games, thus reducing the preseason to three games per team (with the exception of the two teams that compete in the Hall Of Fame Game, who play four).

==== 2020 elimination ====
On June 10, 2020, the NFL Network reported that the NFL and the NFL Players Association were discussing plans to shorten or even eliminate the scheduled four-game pre-season, after off-season activities had been disrupted by the COVID-19 pandemic.

On June 25, the 2020 Pro Football Hall of Fame Game (scheduled for August 6) was canceled along with the 2020 Hall of Fame induction ceremony. On July 1, 2020, various media outlets reported that the league had decided to reduce the pre-season schedule to two weeks, by canceling Weeks 1 and 4, and changing a few fixtures to make sure every team played one home and road game each. The regular season would start as originally scheduled on Thursday, September 10, 2020. The NFLPA voted July 3 to push for the elimination of the 2020 preseason entirely, with extended isolated practice sessions replacing the games. On July 21, 2020, a week before the scheduled opening of training camp, the NFLPA told its members that the league had decided to cancel all preseason games.

== See also ==
- Armed Forces Benefit Football Game, a charity preseason game hosted by the Bears from 1946 to 1970
