= 1987 NFL season =

American football season

Regular season
- Duration: September 13 – December 28, 1987
- A player's strike shortened the regular season to 15 games.

Playoffs
- Start date: January 3, 1988
- AFC Champions: Denver Broncos
- NFC Champions: Washington Redskins

Super Bowl XXII
- Date: January 31, 1988
- Site: Jack Murphy Stadium, San Diego, California
- Champions: Washington Redskins

Pro Bowl
- Date: February 7, 1988
- Site: Aloha Stadium

AFC teams: West, Central, East
NFC teams: West, Central, East

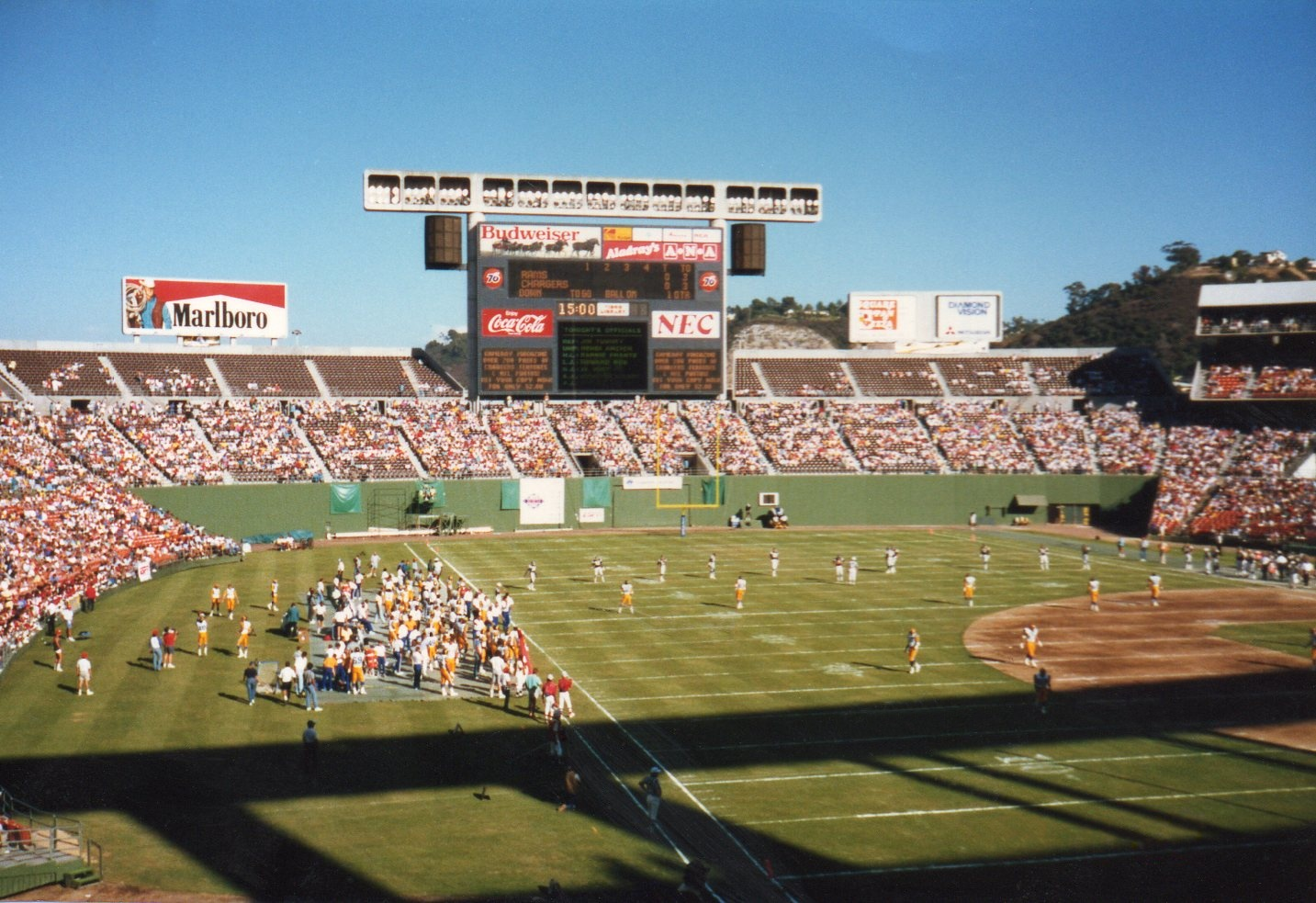
The San Diego Chargers hosting a pre-season game against the Los Angeles Rams at San Diego Jack Murphy Stadium in 1987.

The 1987 NFL season was the 68th regular season of the National Football League (NFL). The National Football League Players Association (NFLPA) players were on strike in weeks three through six; all games in week three were cancelled, and games in the fourth through sixth weeks were predominantly played by replacement players. This remains the last NFL season in which regular-season games were impacted by a labor conflict (as well as the last season when non-union players were used as strikebreaking competitors).

The season ended with Super Bowl XXII, with the Washington Redskins defeating the Denver Broncos 42–10 at Jack Murphy Stadium in San Diego. The Broncos suffered their second consecutive Super Bowl defeat.

== Player movement ==
=== Trades ===
- On October 31, 1987, the Los Angeles Rams traded Eric Dickerson to the Indianapolis Colts in a three-team trade involving the Buffalo Bills. The Rams sent Dickerson to the Colts for six draft choices and two players. Buffalo obtained the rights to Cornelius Bennett from Indianapolis. Buffalo sent running back Greg Bell and three draft choices to the Rams, while Indianapolis added Owen Gill and three of their own draft picks to complete the deal with the Rams.

=== Draft ===
The 1987 NFL draft was held from April 28 to 29, 1987, at New York City's Marriott Marquis. With the first pick, the Tampa Bay Buccaneers selected quarterback Vinny Testaverde from the University of Miami.

== Referee changes ==
Chuck Heberling retired during the 1987 offseason. He joined the NFL in 1965 as a line judge before being promoted to referee in 1972. Games that he officiated include the Hail Mary Game and The Drive. Fred Silva, who was a swing official in 1986, was given his own crew again.

== Major rule changes ==
- If a defensive player commits pass interference in his own end zone, the ball is placed at the 1-yard line, or if the previous spot was inside the 2-yard line, the penalty is half the distance to the goal line.
- Except for the first onside kick attempt, if a kickoff goes out of bounds, the receiving team takes possession of the ball 30 yards from the spot of the kick or the spot it went out of bounds.
- In order to stop the clock, the quarterback is permitted to throw the ball out of bounds or to the ground as long as he throws it immediately after receiving the snap.
- During passing plays, an offensive player cannot chop block (block a defender below the thigh while the defensive player is already engaging another offensive player).
- Illegal contact by a defensive player beyond the 5-yard zone from the line of scrimmage will not be called if the offensive team is in an obvious punt formation.
- During kicks and punts, players on the receiving team cannot block below the waist. However, players on the kicking team may block below the waist, but only before the kick is made. On all other plays after a change of possession, no player can block below the waist.
- Revenue sharing was changed so that NFL players received a portion of the ticket revenue, while the owners kept the revenue generated by skybox rentals. This led to many teams pushing for new stadiums which lowered many skybox suites from the less-desirable outer rim of a stadium to more desirable locations closer to the field (typically, the midsection or lower) so that the owners could charge more money for the suites, while similarly reducing the ticket revenue by replacing the higher-priced seats with lower-priced "nose bleed" seats. Overall, the number of available general admission seating was also reduced in favor of larger suites.

== Deaths ==
- December 15 – Ray Malavasi, 57, who coached the Los Angeles Rams to their first Super Bowl appearance in Super Bowl XIV.

== The NFLPA strike ==
A 24-day players' strike was called after week 2. The games that were scheduled for the third week of the season were cancelled, reducing the 16-game season to 15, but the games for Weeks 4, 5 and 6 were played with replacement players. The NFLPA actually ended the strike before the week 6 slate of games, but the NFL owners unanimously refused a week 6 return because the union had missed an owner-mandated deadline requiring more time between the end of the strike and the union players' return. Approximately 15% of the NFLPA's players chose to cross picket lines to play during the strike; prominent players who did so included New York Jets defensive end Mark Gastineau, Dallas Cowboys defensive tackle Randy White, San Francisco 49ers quarterback Joe Montana, Los Angeles Raiders defensive end Howie Long, 49ers running back Roger Craig, New England Patriots quarterback Doug Flutie and Seattle Seahawks wide receiver Steve Largent. The replacement players were mostly ones who had been put out of work by the recent folding of the Canadian Football League's Montreal Alouettes and the 1986 dissolution of the United States Football League, as well as some who had been cut during the NFL preseason, had long left professional football or were other assorted oddities. The replacement players, called to play on short notice and having little chance to gel as teammates, were widely treated with scorn by the press and general public, including name calling, public shaming and accusations of being scabs. The games played by replacement players were also held in low regard by the public – attendance plummeted to under 10,000 fans at many of the games in smaller markets and cities with strong union presence, including a low of 4,074 for the lone replacement game played in Philadelphia – but the league counted them as regular games. Television revenues during the strike were down by about 20%, a smaller drop than the networks had expected. The defending Super Bowl champion New York Giants went 0–3 in the replacement games, ultimately costing them a chance to make the playoffs and to repeat their championship. The final replacement game was a Monday Night Football matchup on October 19, 1987, with the Washington Redskins at the Dallas Cowboys. Along with the Philadelphia Eagles, the Redskins were the only other NFL team not to have any union players cross the picket line, and were surprising 13–7 victors over the Cowboys, who had plenty of big-name players cross the picket line.

The 2017 film Year of the Scab, which aired as part of the ESPN series 30 for 30, documented the story of replacement players who crossed the picket line to play for the Redskins. A fictionalized account based on the 1987 strike formed the basis of the 2000 film The Replacements.

== American Bowl ==
A series of National Football League preseason exhibition games that were held at sites outside the United States, the only American Bowl game in 1987 was held at London's Wembley Stadium.

Date	Winning team	Score	Losing team	Score	Stadium	City
August 9, 1987	Los Angeles Rams	28	Denver Broncos	27	Wembley Stadium	(United Kingdom) London

== Regular season ==
=== Scheduling formula ===
Inter-conference
AFC East vs NFC East
AFC Central vs NFC West
AFC West vs NFC Central

Highlights of the 1987 season included:

- Thanksgiving: Two games were played on Thursday, November 26, featuring Kansas City at Detroit and Minnesota at Dallas, with Kansas City and Minnesota winning.

=== Final standings ===
AFC East
	W	L	T	PCT	DIV	CONF	PF	PA	STK
^{(3)} Indianapolis Colts	9	6	0	.600	5–3	8–6	300	238	W2
New England Patriots	8	7	0	.533	6–2	8–4	320	293	W3
Miami Dolphins	8	7	0	.533	2–6	5–7	362	335	L1
Buffalo Bills	7	8	0	.467	4–4	6–6	270	305	L2
New York Jets	6	9	0	.400	3–5	6–5	334	360	L4

AFC Central
	W	L	T	PCT	DIV	CONF	PF	PA	STK
^{(2)} Cleveland Browns	10	5	0	.667	5–1	8–3	390	239	W3
^{(4)} Houston Oilers	9	6	0	.600	5–1	7–4	345	349	W2
Pittsburgh Steelers	8	7	0	.533	2–4	6–5	285	299	L2
Cincinnati Bengals	4	11	0	.267	0–6	3–9	285	370	L3

AFC West
	W	L	T	PCT	DIV	CONF	PF	PA	STK
^{(1)} Denver Broncos	10	4	1	.700	7–1	8–3	379	288	W2
^{(5)} Seattle Seahawks	9	6	0	.600	4–3	5–6	371	314	L1
San Diego Chargers	8	7	0	.533	3–4	6–7	253	317	L6
Los Angeles Raiders	5	10	0	.333	2–6	3–8	301	289	L3
Kansas City Chiefs	4	11	0	.267	3–5	3–9	273	388	W1

NFC East
	W	L	T	PCT	DIV	CONF	PF	PA	STK
^{(3)} Washington Redskins	11	4	0	.733	7–1	9–3	379	285	W1
Dallas Cowboys	7	8	0	.467	4–4	5–7	340	348	W2
St. Louis Cardinals	7	8	0	.467	3–5	7–7	362	368	L1
Philadelphia Eagles	7	8	0	.467	3–5	4–7	337	380	W2
New York Giants	6	9	0	.400	3–5	4–8	280	312	W2

NFC Central
	W	L	T	PCT	DIV	CONF	PF	PA	STK
^{(2)} Chicago Bears	11	4	0	.733	7–0	9–2	356	282	W1
^{(5)} Minnesota Vikings	8	7	0	.533	3–5	6–6	336	335	L1
Green Bay Packers	5	9	1	.367	3–4	4–7	255	300	L2
Tampa Bay Buccaneers	4	11	0	.267	3–4	4–9	286	360	L8
Detroit Lions	4	11	0	.267	2–5	4–7	269	384	W1

NFC West
	W	L	T	PCT	DIV	CONF	PF	PA	STK
^{(1)} San Francisco 49ers	13	2	0	.867	5–1	10–1	459	253	W6
^{(4)} New Orleans Saints	12	3	0	.800	4–1	8–3	422	283	W9
Los Angeles Rams	6	9	0	.400	1–5	5–7	317	361	L2
Atlanta Falcons	3	12	0	.200	1–4	3–8	205	436	L3

=== Tiebreakers ===
- Houston was the #4 seed in the AFC, winning a tiebreaker over Seattle based on better conference record (7–4 vs. Seahawks' 5–6).
- Chicago was the #2 seed in the NFC, winning a tiebreaker over Washington based on better conference record (9–2 vs. Redskins' 9–3).
- New England finished ahead of Miami in the AFC East based on head-to-head sweep (2–0).
- Dallas finished ahead of St. Louis and Philadelphia in the NFC East based on better division record (4–4 to Cardinals' 3–5 and Eagles' 3–5), and St. Louis finished ahead of Philadelphia based on better conference record (7–7 to Eagles' 4–7).
- Tampa Bay finished ahead of Detroit in the NFC Central based on better division record (3–4 to Lions' 2–5).

== Playoffs ==
Jan 9 – Candlestick Park
5	Minnesota	36
Jan 3 – Louisiana Superdome	Jan 17 – RFK Stadium
1	San Francisco	24
NFC
5	Minnesota	44	5	Minnesota	10
Jan 10 – Soldier Field
4	New Orleans	10	3	Washington	17
NFC Championship
3	Washington	21
Jan 31 – Jack Murphy Stadium
2	Chicago	17
Divisional round
Wild-card round	N3	Washington	42
Jan 9 – Cleveland Stadium
A1	Denver	10
Super Bowl XXII
3	Indianapolis	21
Jan 3 – Astrodome	Jan 17 – Mile High Stadium
2	Cleveland	38
AFC
5	Seattle	20	2	Cleveland	33
Jan 10 – Mile High Stadium
4	Houston	23*	1	Denver	38
AFC Championship
4	Houston	10
1	Denver	34

* Indicates overtime victory

== Awards ==
As awarded by the Associated Press

Most Valuable Player	John Elway, quarterback, Denver
Coach of the Year	Jim Mora, New Orleans
Offensive Player of the Year	Jerry Rice, wide receiver, San Francisco
Defensive Player of the Year	Reggie White, defensive end, Philadelphia
Offensive Rookie of the Year	Troy Stradford, running back, Miami
Defensive Rookie of the Year	Shane Conlan, linebacker, Buffalo
NFL Comeback Player of the Year	Charles White, running back, LA Rams
NFL Man of the Year	Dave Duerson, safety, Chicago
Super Bowl Most Valuable Player	Doug Williams, quarterback, Washington

== Coaching changes ==
- Atlanta Falcons: Marion Campbell began his second stint as head coach of the Falcons, replacing the fired Dan Henning. Campbell previously coached the Falcons from the eighth game of 1974 through the seventh game of 1976, and was also coach of the Philadelphia Eagles from 1983 through the 15th game of 1985.
- Buffalo Bills: Marv Levy began his first full season as the Bills' head coach. He was named as Hank Bullough's replacement after 9 games into the 1986 season.
- Indianapolis Colts: Ron Meyer begin his first full season as the Colts' head coach. After Rod Dowhower was fired after the Colts lost their first 13 games in 1986, Meyer promptly led the team to three straight victories to finish 3–13.
- Kansas City Chiefs: John Mackovic was fired and replaced by Frank Gansz.
- San Diego Chargers: Al Saunders begin his first full season as the Chargers' head coach. He replaced Don Coryell, who left after a 1–7 start in 1986.
- Tampa Bay Buccaneers: Leeman Bennett was fired and replaced by Alabama coach Ray Perkins, who previously coached the New York Giants from 1979 to 1982.

== Stadium changes ==
The Miami Dolphins began playing at their new home, Joe Robbie Stadium, moving from the Miami Orange Bowl. This was also the Cardinals' final season at Busch Memorial Stadium in St. Louis; the team relocated to Tempe, Arizona, the following season.

== Uniform changes ==
- The Atlanta Falcons moved the Falcon emblem on their jersey sleeves downward, now being superimposed on the sleeve striping.
- The Buffalo Bills switched from blue face masks to white.
- The Indianapolis Colts began wearing their white pants with their blue jerseys, discontinuing their gray pants, which had been worn since 1982.
- The Miami Dolphins introduced a redesigned jersey to coincide with the opening of Joe Robbie Stadium. The stripes on the sleeves were pared down from five to three to make way for the helmet logo on the sleeves; the TV numbers moved from the sleeves to the shoulders; and the numbers changed to a new Dolphins-specific font.

== Television changes ==
The eight-year old ESPN cable network signed a three-year deal to become the first cable television broadcaster of the league, broadcasting a series of Sunday night games during the second half of the season. Its program ESPN Sunday Night NFL (subsequently rebranded as ESPN Sunday Night Football) debuted on November 8, 1987. The league also mandated that each ESPN game must air via broadcast syndication to an over-the-air station in the markets of the participating teams. ESPN also debuted NFL Primetime, featuring scores, highlights, and analysis of the Sunday afternoon games; the program served as a pregame show during those weeks of Sunday Night Football.

In addition, ABC, CBS, and NBC each signed three-year contracts to renew their rights to broadcast Monday Night Football, the NFC package, and the AFC package, respectively.

ABC returned to a three-man booth, hiring Dan Dierdorf from CBS to join Al Michaels and Frank Gifford. ESPN's initial broadcast team consisted of Mike Patrick on play-by-play, with Roy Firestone and a weekly "guest color commentator". NFL Primetime included host Chris Berman, and analysts Tom Jackson and Pete Axthelm. NBC renamed its pregame show NFL Live! Gayle Sierens then made history as the first woman to do play-by-play for an NFL regular season game, calling NBC's telecast of the December 27 game between the Seattle Seahawks and the Kansas City Chiefs.

CBS fired "Jimmy the Greek" Snyder on January 16, 1988, a few days before the NFC Championship Game, after he made several questionable comments about African Americans during an interview with Ed Hotaling, producer-reporter for Washington, D.C. NBC-owned station WRC-TV.
