= 1982 New England Patriots season =

Season of National Football League team the New England Patriots

- Owner: Billy Sullivan
- General manager: Bucko Kilroy
- Head coach: Ron Meyer
- Offensive coordinator: Lew Erber
- Defensive coordinator: Jim E. Mora
- Home stadium: Schaefer Stadium

Results
- Record: 5–4
- Division place: 7th AFC (Would have been 3rd in the AFC East)
- Playoffs: Lost Wild Card Playoffs (at Dolphins) 13–28
- All-Pros: G John Hannah (2nd team); CB Mike Haynes (2nd team)
- Pro Bowlers: G John Hannah; CB Mike Haynes

Uniform

The 1982 New England Patriots season was the franchise's 13th season in the National Football League and 23rd overall. They finished the National Football League's strike-shortened season with a record of five wins and four losses and finished seventh in the American Football Conference. Due to the format of the playoffs adopted for the season due to the strike, the Patriots qualified as the #7 seed and were eliminated in the first round of the playoffs by the eventual conference champion Miami Dolphins 28–13.

After firing Ron Erhardt after a dismal 2–14 season in 1981, the Patriots hired Southern Methodist University head coach Ron Meyer to be their new coach. Meyer led the Patriots to the playoffs for the first time since 1978, where they won the division under Chuck Fairbanks but were defeated in their opening playoff game.

One of the most notable games in NFL history occurred during the season, when the Patriots hosted the Dolphins in a game played in frozen conditions and under a blanket of snow at Schaefer Stadium. The Patriots won the game 3–0 doing so after a stadium worker used a snowplow to assist kicker John Smith in making the winning field goal.

== Offseason ==
=== NFL draft ===
1982 New England Patriots draft
Round	Pick	Player	Position	College	Notes
1	1	Kenneth Sims	Defensive end	Texas	
1	27	Lester Williams	Nose tackle	Miami (FL)	from San Francisco
2	40	Robert Weathers	Running back	Arizona State	from Green Bay via San Diego
2	41	Andre Tippett * ^{†}	Linebacker	Iowa	from Washington via San Francisco
2	55	Darryl Haley	Offensive tackle	Utah	from San Francisco
3	56	Cedric Jones	Wide receiver	Duke	
3	60	Clayton Weishuhn	Linebacker	Angelo State	from Seattle
4	85	George Crump	Defensive end	East Carolina	
4	111	Brian Ingram	Linebacker	Tennessee	
5	112	Fred Marion *	Safety	Miami (FL)	
6	141	Ricky Smith	Cornerback	Alabama State	
7	168	Jeff Roberts	Linebacker	Tulane	
8	197	Ken Collins	Linebacker	Washington State	
9	224	Kelvin Murdock	Wide receiver	Troy State	
10	253	Brian Clark	Placekicker	Florida	
11	296	Steve Sandon	Quarterback	Northern Iowa	
12	308	Greg Taylor	Running back	Virginia	
Made roster † Pro Football Hall of Fame * Made at least one Pro Bowl during career

=== Undrafted free agents ===
1982 undrafted free agents of note
Player	Position	College
Bernie Adell	Running Back	Notre Dame
Beau Coash	Tight end	Middlebury

== Personnel ==
=== Staff / Coaches ===
New England Patriots 1982 staff
Front office: President – Billy Sullivan; Executive vice president – Chuck Sullivan; General manager – Bucko Kilroy; Assistant general manager – Patrick Sullivan; Director of player development – Dick Steinberg; Director of college scouting – Joe Mendes; Director of pro scouting – Bill McPeak; Head coaches: Head coach – Ron Meyer; Offensive coaches: Offensive coordinator/quarterbacks – Lew Erber; Offensive backs – Cleve Bryant; Receivers – Steve Endicott; Offensive line – Bill Muir	Defensive coaches: Defensive coordinator – Jim Mora; Defensive line – Tommy Brasher; Linebackers – Steve Sidwell; Secondary – Steve Walters; Special teams coaches: Special teams/tight ends – Dante Scarnecchia; Strength and conditioning: Strength and conditioning – LeBaron Caruthers

=== Roster ===
1982 New England Patriots roster
Quarterbacks (QB): 12 Matt Cavanaugh; 10 Tom Flick; 14 Steve Grogan; Running backs (RB): 33 Tony Collins; 44 Larry Cowan; 39 Sam Cunningham; 43 Vagas Ferguson; 30 Mosi Tatupu; 45 Greg Taylor; 34 Mark van Eeghen; 24 Robert Weathers; Wide receivers (WR): 88 Morris Bradshaw; 81 Preston Brown; 83 Cedric Jones; 86 Stanley Morgan; 82 Ken Toler; Tight ends (TE): 87 Lin Dawson; 80 Don Hasselbeck; 49 Brian Williams	Offensive linemen (OL): 58 Pete Brock C; 75 Bob Cryder G; 68 Darryl Haley T; 73 John Hannah G; 76 Brian Holloway T; 74 Shelby Jordan T; 62 Dwight Wheeler C; 61 Ron Wooten G; Defensive linemen (DL): 85 Julius Adams DE; 91 George Crump DE; 70 Luther Henson NT; 98 Dennis Owens NT; 77 Kenneth Sims DE; 78 Ron Spears DE; 72 Lester Williams NT	Linebackers (LB): 55 Don Blackmon OLB; 59 Tim Golden ILB; 51 Brian Ingram OLB; 50 Larry McGrew OLB; 57 Steve Nelson ILB; 56 Andre Tippett OLB; 53 Clayton Weishuhn ILB; 54 John Zamberlin ILB; Defensive backs (DB): 26 Raymond Clayborn CB; 47 Paul Dombroski CB; 40 Mike Haynes CB; 38 Roland James SS; 22 Keith Lee SS; 31 Fred Marion FS; 25 Rick Sanford FS; 27 Ricky Smith CB; Special teams (ST): 3 Rich Camarillo P; 2 Dan Miller K; 7 Rex Robinson K; 1 John Smith K	Reserve: 65 Stevan Clark T (IR); 90 Ken Collins NT (IR); 32 Andy Johnson RB (IR); 19 Mike Kerrigan QB (IR); 43 Vagas Ferguson RB (IR); 48 Terry Smith S (IR); Rookies in italics

== Regular season ==
=== Schedule ===
Week	Original Week	Date	Opponent	Result	Record	Venue	Recap
1	1	September 12	at **Baltimore Colts**	**W** 24–13	1–0	Memorial Stadium	Recap
2	2	September 19	**New York Jets**	**L** 7–31	1–1	Schaefer Stadium	Recap
—	3	Seattle Seahawks		Cancelled due to players’ strike			
—	4	at Buffalo Bills		Cancelled due to players’ strike			
—	5	Cincinnati Bengals		Cancelled due to players’ strike			
—	6	at Miami Dolphins		Cancelled due to players’ strike			
—	7	St. Louis Cardinals		Cancelled due to players’ strike			
—	8	at New York Jets		Cancelled due to players’ strike			
—	9	Baltimore Colts		Cancelled due to players’ strike			
—	10	**Buffalo Bills**		**Postponed due to players’ strike**			
3	11	November 21	at Cleveland Browns	**L** 7–10	1–2	Cleveland Stadium	Recap
4	12	November 28	Houston Oilers	**W** 29–21	2–2	Schaefer Stadium	Recap
5	13	December 5	at Chicago Bears	**L** 13–26	2–3	Soldier Field	Recap
6	14	December 12	**Miami Dolphins**	**W** 3–0	3–3	Schaefer Stadium	Recap
7	15	December 19	at Seattle Seahawks	**W** 16–0	4–3	Kingdome	Recap
8	16	December 26	at Pittsburgh Steelers	**L** 14–37	4–4	Three Rivers Stadium	Recap
9	17	January 2	**Buffalo Bills**	**W** 30–19	5–4	Schaefer Stadium	Recap
Note: Intra-division opponents are in **bold** text.

=== Standings ===
AFC East
	W	L	T	PCT	DIV	CONF	PF	PA	STK
^{(2)} Miami Dolphins	7	2	0	.778	6–1	6–1	198	131	W3
^{(6)} New York Jets	6	3	0	.667	2–2	2–3	245	166	L1
^{(7)} New England Patriots	5	4	0	.556	3–1	5–3	143	157	W1
Buffalo Bills	4	5	0	.444	1–3	3–3	150	154	L3
Baltimore Colts	0	8	1	.056	0–5	0–7	113	236	L2

AFC
#	Team	W	L	T	PCT	PF	PA	STK
**Seeded postseason qualifiers**
1	Los Angeles Raiders	8	1	0	.889	260	200	W5
2 (Note: Miami finished ahead of Cincinnati based on better conference record (6–1 to Cincinnati’s 6–2).)	Miami Dolphins	7	2	0	.778	198	131	W3
3	Cincinnati Bengals	7	2	0	.778	232	177	W2
4 (Note: Pittsburgh finished ahead of San Diego based on better record against common opponents (3–1 to Chargers' 2–1). Conference tiebreak was initially used to eliminate New York Jets.) (Note: Pittsburgh and San Diego finished ahead of New York Jets based on conference record (Pittsburgh and San Diego 5–3 against Jets’ 2–3))	Pittsburgh Steelers	6	3	0	.667	204	146	W2
5	San Diego Chargers	6	3	0	.667	288	221	L1
6	New York Jets	6	3	0	.667	245	166	L1
7	New England Patriots	5	4	0	.556	143	157	W1
8 (Note: Cleveland finished ahead of Buffalo and Buffalo ahead of Seattle based on conference record (4–3 to Buffalo’s 3–3 to Seattle’s 3–5).)	Cleveland Browns	4	5	0	.444	140	182	L1
**Did not qualify for the postseason**
9	Buffalo Bills	4	5	0	.444	150	154	L3
10	Seattle Seahawks	4	5	0	.444	127	147	W1
11	Kansas City Chiefs	3	6	0	.333	176	184	W1
12	Denver Broncos	2	7	0	.222	148	226	L3
13	Houston Oilers	1	8	0	.111	136	245	L7
14	Baltimore Colts	0	8	1	.056	113	236	L2
**Tiebreakers**

== Playoffs ==
Round	Date	Opponent (seed)	Result	Record	Venue	Recap
AFC first round	January 8, 1983	at Miami Dolphins (2)	L 13–28	0–1	Miami Orange Bowl	Recap

== See also ==
- New England Patriots seasons
