= 1982 Pittsburgh Steelers season =

Pittsburgh Steelers 50th US football season

- Steelers 50th Anniversary Logo
- Owner: Art Rooney
- General manager: Dick Haley
- Head coach: Chuck Noll
- Defensive coordinator: Woody Widenhofer
- Home stadium: Three Rivers Stadium

Results
- Record: 6–3
- Division place: 4th AFC (Would have been 2nd in the AFC Central)
- Playoffs: Lost Wild Card Playoffs (vs. Chargers) 28–31
- All-Pros: Jack Lambert (1st team); Donnie Shell (1st team)
- Pro Bowlers: OT Larry Brown; LB Jack Lambert; S Donnie Shell; WR John Stallworth; C Mike Webster
- Team MVP: Dwayne Woodruff

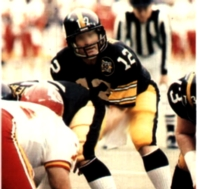
Bradshaw setting up a play against the Chiefs during week 13.

The 1982 Pittsburgh Steelers season was the franchise's 50th in the National Football League. The Steelers returned to the playoffs after missing the playoffs for two years. This was also the Steelers 50th Anniversary season. Although the season was shortened as a result of the 1982 strike, the Steelers finished with a strong 6–3 record, good enough for fourth in the AFC as a whole. Although division standings were thrown out as a result of the strike, the Steelers unofficially finished second in the AFC Central, one game behind the defending AFC Champion Cincinnati Bengals. This for first time since 1968 that Joe Greene was not on the opening day roster.

The 1982 season is best remembered as the final seasons for Hall of Famers Lynn Swann and Jack Ham and the "unofficial" final season of fellow Hall of Famer Terry Bradshaw, who would miss much of the 1983 season due to injuries before retiring. On the flip side, it would also be the first year of placekicker Gary Anderson and the first year of the team using a 3–4 defense, a style still used by the team as of 2019.

The Steelers would lose in the first round of the playoffs to the San Diego Chargers, in what would be the last home playoff game for the Steelers for the next ten years.

== Offseason ==
=== NFL draft ===
1982 Pittsburgh Steelers draft
| Round | Pick | Player | Position | College | Notes |
| 1 | 12 | Walter Abercrombie | Running back | Baylor | |
| 2 | 43 | John Meyer | Tackle | Arizona State | |
| 3 | 70 | Mike Merriweather * | Linebacker | Pacific | |
| 4 | 97 | Rick Woods | Cornerback | Boise State | |
| 5 | 124 | Ken Dallafior | Guard | Minnesota | |
| 6 | 155 | Mike Perko | Defensive tackle | Utah State | |
| 6 | 167 | Craig Bingham | Linebacker | Syracuse | |
| 7 | 172 | Edmund Nelson | Defensive tackle | Auburn | |
| 7 | 182 | Emil Boures | Center | Pittsburgh | |
| 8 | 209 | John Goodson | Punter | Texas | |
| 9 | 236 | Mike Hirn | Tight end | Central Michigan | |
| 10 | 267 | Sal Sunseri | Linebacker | Pittsburgh | |
| 11 | 293 | Mikal Abdul-Saboor | Guard | Morgan State | |
| 12 | 320 | Al Hughes | Defensive end | Western Michigan | |
Made roster * Made at least one Pro Bowl during career

== Personnel ==
=== Staff ===
1982 Pittsburgh Steelers staff
| Front office: Chairman of the board – Arthur J. Rooney; President – Daniel M. Rooney; Vice president – John R. McGinley; Vice president – Arthur J. Rooney, Jr.; Controller – Dennis P. Thimons; Assistant controller – Dan Ferens; Traveling secretary – James A. Boston; Public relations director – Ed Kiely; Publicity director – Joe Gordon; Assistant publicity director – John Evenson; Director of ticket sales – Geraldine Glenn; Director of player personnel – Dick Haley; Assistant director of player personnel – William Nunn, Jr.; Pro talent scout – Tom Modrak; Talent scout – West Coast – Bob Schmitz; College talent scout – Joe Krupa; Head coaches: Head coach – Chuck Noll; Assistant head coach – George Perles; Offensive coaches: Offensive line – Rollie Dotsch; Offensive backfield – Dick Hoak; Receivers – Tom Moore | Defensive coaches: Defensive coordinator – Woody Widenhofer; Defensive backfield – Tony Dungy; Strength and conditioning: Conditioning coach – Jon Kolb; Physician, M.D. – Dr. David S. Huber; Physician, M.D. – Dr. Anthony P. Yates; Physician, orthopedic – Dr. Paul Steele; Neurological surgery consultant – Dr. Joseph C. Maroon; Dentist – Dr. George P. Boucek; Ophthalmologist – Dr. Phillip Buzzelli; Trainer – Ralph Berlin; Assistant trainer – Gary Stragar; Equipment manager – Anthony Parisi; Field manager – Rodgers Freyvogel; Film director – Bob McCartney; Photographers – Harry Homa, Bill Amatucci |

=== Roster ===
1982 Pittsburgh Steelers roster
| Quarterbacks (QB): 12 Terry Bradshaw; 16 Mark Malone; 18 Cliff Stoudt; Running backs (RB): 34 Walter Abercrombie; 45 Russell Davis; 32 Franco Harris; 27 Greg Hawthorne; 44 Frank Pollard; Wide receivers (WR): 86 Jim Smith; 82 John Stallworth; 88 Lynn Swann; 85 Calvin Sweeney; 83 Willie Sydnor; Tight ends (TE): 89 Bennie Cunningham; 87 John Rodgers | Offensive linemen (OL): 71 Emil Boures G; 79 Larry Brown T; 77 Steve Courson G; 55 Rick Donnalley C/G; 62 Tunch Ilkin T; 61 Tyrone McGriff G; 66 Ted Petersen T; 74 Ray Pinney T; 52 Mike Webster C; 73 Craig Wolfley G; Defensive linemen (DL): 65 Tom Beasley DE; 67 Gary Dunn NT; 95 John Goodman DE; 64 Edmund Nelson NT; 93 Keith Willis DE | Linebackers (LB): 54 Craig Bingham OLB; 56 Robin Cole OLB; 59 Jack Ham OLB; 53 Bryan Hinkle OLB; 90 Bob Kohrs ILB; 58 Jack Lambert ILB; 50 David Little ILB; 57 Mike Merriweather OLB; 36 Guy Ruff OLB; 51 Loren Toews ILB; Defensive backs (DB): 23 Fred Bohannon SS; 47 Mel Blount CB; 29 Ron Johnson FS; 31 Donnie Shell SS; 42 Anthony Washington CB; 41 Sam Washington CB; 49 Dwayne Woodruff CB; Special teams (ST): 1 Gary Anderson K; 17 John Goodson P | Reserve: -- Mikal Abdul-Saboor G (IR); 5 Craig Colquitt P (PUP); 72 Ken Dallafior T (IR); 20 Ernest French S (IR); 97 John Meyer T (IR); 60 Sal Sunseri LB (IR); 38 Sidney Thornton RB (IR); 37 Frank Wilson TE (IR); 22 Rick Woods S (IR); Rookies in italics 49 active, 9 reserve |

== Offseason ==
The 1982 offseason was the start of a slow transition period for the team, as the defensive line was hit with key retirements in "Mean Joe" Greene and L. C. Greenwood. Partially due to the team losing two key players and partially due to the need to go up against a more wide-open NFL, head coach Chuck Noll switched from the traditional 4–3 defensive alignment (four lineman & three linebackers) to the 3–4 (three lineman & four linebackers). The Steelers would more than make a good transition to the 3–4, as many teams have since tried to copy the Steelers success with the 3–4 alignment, especially since 2001, when the Steelers were the only team in the NFL with the alignment but led the league in defense.

1982 did see the Steelers sign a rookie placekicker from Syracuse named Gary Anderson, claiming him off waivers from Buffalo just before the start of the season. Anderson would stay in Pittsburgh for the next 13 season and play an additional 10 with four other teams to become the Steelers' all-time leading scorer. He retired after the 2004 season as the NFL's all-time leading scorer, a record since surpassed by Morten Andersen.

== Preseason ==
| Week | Date | Opponent | Result | Record | Venue |
|---|---|---|---|---|---|
| 1 | August 14 | vs. New England Patriots | W 24–20 | 1–0 | Neyland Stadium (Knoxville, Tennessee) |
| 2 | August 21 | at New York Giants | W 13–10 | 2–0 | Giants Stadium |
| 3 | August 28 | Baltimore Colts | W 37–15 | 3–0 | Three Rivers Stadium |
| 4 | September 4 | Philadelphia Eagles | W 27–24 | 4–0 | Three Rivers Stadium |

== Regular season ==
=== Schedule ===
| Week | Original week | Date | Opponent | Result | Record | Venue |
|---|---|---|---|---|---|---|
| 1 | 1 | September 13 | at Dallas Cowboys | **W** 36–28 | 1–0 | Texas Stadium |
| 2 | 2 | September 19 | **Cincinnati Bengals** | **W** 26–20 (OT) | 2–0 | Three Rivers Stadium |
| — | 3 | September 26 | New York Giants | Canceled | 2–0 | Three Rivers Stadium |
| — | 4 | October 3 | at Denver Broncos | Canceled | 2–0 | Mile High Stadium |
| — | 5 | October 11 | Philadelphia Eagles | Canceled | 2–0 | Three Rivers Stadium |
| — | 6 | October 17 | at Washington Redskins | Canceled | 2–0 | RFK Stadium |
| — | 7 | October 24 | **Cleveland Browns** | Postponed | 2–0 | Three Rivers Stadium |
| — | 8 | October 31 | at Cincinnati Bengals | Canceled | 2–0 | Riverfront Stadium |
| — | 9 | November 7 | Houston Oilers | Canceled | 2–0 | Three Rivers Stadium |
| — | 10 | November 14 | New York Jets | Canceled | 2–0 | Three Rivers Stadium |
| 3 | 11 | November 21 | at **Houston Oilers** | **W** 24–10 | 3–0 | Astrodome |
| 4 | 12 | November 28 | at Seattle Seahawks | **L** 0–16 | 3–1 | Kingdome |
| 5 | 13 | December 5 | Kansas City Chiefs | **W** 35–14 | 4–1 | Three Rivers Stadium |
| 6 | 14 | December 12 | at Buffalo Bills | **L** 0–13 | 4–2 | Rich Stadium |
| 7 | 15 | December 19 | at **Cleveland Browns** | **L** 9–10 | 4–3 | Cleveland Municipal Stadium |
| 8 | 16 | December 26 | New England Patriots | **W** 37–14 | 5–3 | Three Rivers Stadium |
| 9 | 17 | January 2 | **Cleveland Browns** | **W** 37–21 | 6–3 | Three Rivers Stadium |
Note: Intra-division opponents are in **bold** text.

=== Game summaries ===
==== Week 1 at Cowboys ====
Week One: Pittsburgh Steelers (0–0) at Dallas Cowboys (0–0)

| Quarter | 1 | 2 | 3 | 4 | Total |
|---|---|---|---|---|---|
| **Steelers** | 6 | 7 | 17 | 6 | **36** |
| Cowboys | 7 | 7 | 0 | 14 | **28** |

at Texas Stadium, Irving, Texas

- Date: September 13
- Game time: 9:00 p.m. EST
- Game weather: 84 °F (29 °C)
- Game attendance: 63,431
- Referee: Pat Haggerty
- TV announcers (ABC): Frank Gifford, Don Meredith & Howard Cosell
- Pro-Football-Reference.com

Game information

**First quarter**

- PIT – John Stallworth 8-yard pass from Terry Bradshaw (kick failed). Steelers 6–0. Drive:
- DAL – Drew Pearson 4-yard pass from Danny White (Rafael Septien kick). Cowboys 7–6. Drive:

**Second quarter**

- PIT – Jim Smith 7-yard pass from Terry Bradshaw (Gary Anderson kick). Steelers 13–7. Drive:
- DAL – Doug Cosbie 12-yard pass from Danny White (Rafael Septien kick). Cowboys 14–13. Drive:

**Third quarter**

- PIT – Frank Pollard 1-yard run (Gary Anderson kick). Steelers 20–14. Drive:
- PIT – Jim Smith 15-yard pass from Terry Bradshaw (Gary Anderson kick). Steelers 27–14. Drive:
- PIT – Gary Anderson 26-yard field goal. Steelers 30–14. Drive:

**Fourth quarter**

- PIT – Gary Anderson 43–yard field goal. Steelers 33–14. Drive:
- DAL – Tony Hill 45-yard pass from Danny White (Rafael Septien kick). Steelers 33–21. Drive:
- DAL – Billy Joe DuPree 5-yard pass from Danny White (Rafael Septien kick). Steelers 33–28. Drive:
- PIT – Gary Anderson 40-yard field goal. Steelers 36–28. Drive:

Top passers

- PIT – Terry Bradshaw – 17/28, 246 yards, 3 TD
- DAL – Danny White – 25/36, 347 yards, 4 TD, 2 INT

Top rushers

- PIT – Franco Harris – 24 rushes, 103 yards
- DAL – Tony Dorsett – 11 rushes, 30 yards

Top receivers

- PIT – John Stallworth – 7 receptions, 137 yards, TD
- DAL – Tony Hill – 6 receptions, 130 yards, TD

==== Week 2: vs. Cincinnati Bengals ====
| Quarter | 1 | 2 | 3 | 4 | OT | Total |
|---|---|---|---|---|---|---|
| Bengals | 0 | 3 | 7 | 10 | 0 | **20** |
| **Steelers** | 7 | 3 | 7 | 3 | 6 | **26** |

at Three Rivers Stadium, Pittsburgh, Pennsylvania

- Date: September 19
- Game time: 1:00 pm EDT
- Game weather: 55 °F (13 °C)
- Game attendance: 59,973
- Referee: Jim Tunney
- TV announcers (NBC): Don Criqui & John Brodie

Game information
- Pittsburgh – Stallworth 15 pass from Bradshaw (Anderson kick)
- Cincinnati – FG Breech 50
- Pittsburgh – FG Anderson 25
- Cincinnati – Johnson 1 run (Breech kick)
- Pittsburgh – Cunningham 2 pass from Bradshaw (Anderson kick)
- Cincinnati – Johnson 9 run (Breech kick)
- Cincinnati – FG Breech 31
- Pittsburgh – FG Anderson 42
- Pittsburgh – Stallworth 2 pass from Bradshaw

==== Week 3: vs. New York Giants ====
Cancelled due to player's strike.

==== Week 4: at Denver Broncos ====
Cancelled due to player's strike.

==== Week 5: vs. Philadelphia Eagles ====
Cancelled due to player's strike.

==== Week 6: at Washington Redskins ====
Cancelled due to player's strike.

==== Week 7: vs. Cleveland Browns ====
Postponed due to player's strike.

==== Week 8: at Cincinnati Bengals ====
Cancelled due to player's strike.

==== Week 9: vs. Houston Oilers ====
Cancelled due to player's strike.

==== Week 10: vs. New York Jets ====
Cancelled due to player's strike.

==== Week 11: at Houston Oilers ====
| Quarter | 1 | 2 | 3 | 4 | Total |
|---|---|---|---|---|---|
| **Steelers** | 3 | 7 | 7 | 7 | **24** |
| Oilers | 0 | 3 | 7 | 0 | **10** |

at Astrodome, Houston, Texas

- Date: November 21
- Game time: 1:00 pm EST
- Game weather: indoors (dome)
- Game attendance: 42,338
- Referee: Dick Jorgensen
- TV announcers (NBC): Jay Randolph & John Brodie

Game information
- Pittsburgh – FG Anderson 48
- Pittsburgh – Hawthorne 17 pass from Bradshaw (Anderson kick)
- Houston – FG Kempf 31
- Houston – Casper 9 pass from Nielsen (Kempf kick)
- Pittsburgh – Cunningham 17 pass from Bradshaw (Anderson kick)
- Pittsburgh – Smith 27 pass from Bradshaw (Anderson kick)

==== Week 12: at Seattle Seahawks ====
| Quarter | 1 | 2 | 3 | 4 | Total |
|---|---|---|---|---|---|
| Steelers | 0 | 0 | 0 | 0 | **0** |
| **Seahawks** | 3 | 6 | 7 | 0 | **16** |

at Kingdome, Seattle, Washington

- Date: November 28
- Game time: 4:00 pm EST
- Game weather: indoors (dome)
- Game attendance: 55,553
- Referee: Fred Silva
- TV announcers (NBC): Charlie Jones & Len Dawson

Game information
- Seattle – FG N. Johnson 35
- Seattle – FG N. Johnson 48
- Seattle – FG N. Johnson 29
- Seattle – Johns 11 pass from Zorn (N. Johnson kick)

==== Week 13: vs. Kansas City Chiefs ====
| Quarter | 1 | 2 | 3 | 4 | Total |
|---|---|---|---|---|---|
| Chiefs | 0 | 7 | 0 | 7 | **14** |
| **Steelers** | 14 | 14 | 0 | 7 | **35** |

at Three Rivers Stadium, Pittsburgh, Pennsylvania

- Date: December 5
- Game time: 1:00 pm EST
- Game weather: 58 °F (14 °C)
- Game attendance: 52,090
- Referee: Red Cashion
- TV announcers (NBC): Jay Randolph & Bob Griese

Game information
- Pittsburgh – Stallworth 3 pass from Bradshaw (Anderson kick)
- Pittsburgh – Stallworth 74 pass from Bradshaw (Anderson kick)
- Pittsburgh – Hawthorne 5 pass from Bradshaw (Anderson kick)
- Kansas City – B. Jackson 1 run (Lowery kick)
- Pittsburgh – Harris 1 run (Anderson kick)
- Kansas City – Scott 3 pass from Fuller (Lowery kick)
- Pittsburgh – Thornton 2 run (Anderson kick)

==== Week 14: at Buffalo Bills ====
| Quarter | 1 | 2 | 3 | 4 | Total |
|---|---|---|---|---|---|
| Steelers | 0 | 0 | 0 | 0 | **0** |
| **Bills** | 0 | 10 | 3 | 0 | **13** |

at Rich Stadium, Orchard Park, New York

- Date: December 12
- Game time: 1:00 pm EST
- Game weather: 20 °F (−7 °C), wind chill 8 °F (−13 °C)
- Game attendance: 58,391
- Referee: Pat Haggerty
- TV announcers (NBC): Don Criqui & John Brodie

Game information
- Buffalo – Leaks 1 run (Herrera kick)
- Buffalo – FG Herrera 34
- Buffalo – FG Herrera 19

==== Week 15: at Cleveland Browns ====
| Quarter | 1 | 2 | 3 | 4 | Total |
|---|---|---|---|---|---|
| Steelers | 0 | 7 | 0 | 2 | **9** |
| **Browns** | 3 | 0 | 7 | 0 | **10** |

at Cleveland Municipal Stadium, Cleveland, Ohio

- Date: December 19
- Game time: 1:00 pm EST
- Game weather: 35 °F (2 °C), wind chill 26 °F (−3 °C)
- Game attendance: 67,139
- Referee: Jerry Markbreit
- TV announcers (NBC): Dick Enberg & Merlin Olsen
- Box Score

Game information
- Cleveland – FG Bahr 44
- Pittsburgh – Stallworth 6 pass from Bradshaw (Anderson kick)
- Cleveland – Davis 1 run (Bahr kick)
- Pittsburgh – Safety, Cox ran out of end zone

==== Week 16: vs. New England Patriots ====
| Quarter | 1 | 2 | 3 | 4 | Total |
|---|---|---|---|---|---|
| Patriots | 0 | 0 | 7 | 7 | **14** |
| **Steelers** | 10 | 10 | 0 | 17 | **37** |

at Three Rivers Stadium, Pittsburgh, Pennsylvania

- Date: December 26
- Game time: 1:00 pm EST
- Game weather: 51 °F (11 °C)
- Game attendance: 50,515
- Referee: Tom Dooley
- TV announcers (NBC): Bob Costas & Bob Trumpy

Game information
- Pittsburgh – FG Anderson 21
- Pittsburgh – Pollard 1 run (Anderson kick)
- PIttsburgh – Stallworth 9 pass from Bradshaw (Anderson kick)
- Pittsburgh – FG Anderson 25
- New England – Dawson 23 pass from Cavanaugh (J. Smith kick)
- Pittsburgh – FG Anderson 44
- New England – Morgan 75 pass from Cavanaugh (J. Smith kick)
- Pittsburgh – Hawthorne 46 pass from Bradshaw (Anderson kick)
- Pittsburgh – Abercrombie 1 run (Anderson kick)

==== Week 17: vs. Cleveland Browns ====
| Quarter | 1 | 2 | 3 | 4 | Total |
|---|---|---|---|---|---|
| Browns | 0 | 7 | 0 | 14 | **21** |
| **Steelers** | 7 | 6 | 7 | 17 | **37** |

at Three Rivers Stadium, Pittsburgh, Pennsylvania

- Date: January 2
- Game time: 1:00 pm EST
- Game weather: 31 °F (−1 °C), wind chill 26 °F (−3 °C)
- Game attendance: 53,312
- Referee: Ben Dreith
- TV announcers (NBC): Bob Costas & Bob Trumpy
- Pro-Football-Reference.com

Game information
- Pittsburgh – Pinney 3 pass from Bradshaw (Anderson kick)
- Cleveland – Feacher 1 pass from McDonald (Bahr kick)
- Pittsburgh – Rodgers 18 blocked punt return (run failed)
- Pittsburgh – Harris 6 run (Anderson kick)
- Pittsburgh – Smith 38 pass from Bradshaw (Anderson kick)
- Cleveland – Logan 8 pass from McDonald (Bahr kick)
- Cleveland – Feacher 12 pass from McDonald (Bahr kick)
- Pittsburgh – FG Anderson 34
- Pittsburgh – Abercrombie 1 run (Anderson kick)

**Browns**

- Paul McDonald
  22/47, 313 Yds, 3 TD, 4 INT
- Mike Pruitt
  11 Rush, 30 Yds
- Ozzie Newsome
  9 Rec, 123 Yds

**Steelers**

- Terry Bradshaw
  14/24, 269 Yds, 2 TD, 2 INT
- Franco Harris
  23 Rush, 120 Yds, TD
- Lynn Swann
  5 Rec, 114 Yds

=== Standings ===
AFC Central
| | W | L | T | PCT | DIV | CONF | PF | PA | STK |
|---|---|---|---|---|---|---|---|---|---|
| ^{(3)} Cincinnati Bengals | 7 | 2 | 0 | .778 | 3–1 | 6–2 | 232 | 177 | W2 |
| ^{(4)} Pittsburgh Steelers | 6 | 3 | 0 | .667 | 3–1 | 5–3 | 204 | 146 | W2 |
| ^{(8)} Cleveland Browns | 4 | 5 | 0 | .444 | 2–2 | 4–3 | 140 | 182 | L1 |
| Houston Oilers | 1 | 8 | 0 | .111 | 0–4 | 1–5 | 136 | 245 | L7 |

AFC
| # | Team | W | L | T | PCT | PF | PA | STK |
|---|---|---|---|---|---|---|---|---|
**Seeded postseason qualifiers**
| 1 | Los Angeles Raiders | 8 | 1 | 0 | .889 | 260 | 200 | W5 |
| 2 (Note: Miami finished ahead of Cincinnati based on better conference record (6–1 to Cincinnati’s 6–2).) | Miami Dolphins | 7 | 2 | 0 | .778 | 198 | 131 | W3 |
| 3 | Cincinnati Bengals | 7 | 2 | 0 | .778 | 232 | 177 | W2 |
| 4 (Note: Pittsburgh finished ahead of San Diego based on better record against common opponents (3–1 to Chargers' 2–1). Conference tiebreak was initially used to eliminate New York Jets.) (Note: Pittsburgh and San Diego finished ahead of New York Jets based on conference record (Pittsburgh and San Diego 5–3 against Jets’ 2–3)) | Pittsburgh Steelers | 6 | 3 | 0 | .667 | 204 | 146 | W2 |
| 5 | San Diego Chargers | 6 | 3 | 0 | .667 | 288 | 221 | L1 |
| 6 | New York Jets | 6 | 3 | 0 | .667 | 245 | 166 | L1 |
| 7 | New England Patriots | 5 | 4 | 0 | .556 | 143 | 157 | W1 |
| 8 (Note: Cleveland finished ahead of Buffalo and Buffalo ahead of Seattle based on conference record (4–3 to Buffalo’s 3–3 to Seattle’s 3–5).) | Cleveland Browns | 4 | 5 | 0 | .444 | 140 | 182 | L1 |
**Did not qualify for the postseason**
| 9 | Buffalo Bills | 4 | 5 | 0 | .444 | 150 | 154 | L3 |
| 10 | Seattle Seahawks | 4 | 5 | 0 | .444 | 127 | 147 | W1 |
| 11 | Kansas City Chiefs | 3 | 6 | 0 | .333 | 176 | 184 | W1 |
| 12 | Denver Broncos | 2 | 7 | 0 | .222 | 148 | 226 | L3 |
| 13 | Houston Oilers | 1 | 8 | 0 | .111 | 136 | 245 | L7 |
| 14 | Baltimore Colts | 0 | 8 | 1 | .056 | 113 | 236 | L2 |
**Tiebreakers**

== Postseason ==
=== Game summary ===
==== First Round/Wild Card: vs. San Diego Chargers ====
On January 9, 1983, the Pittsburgh Steelers played the San Diego Chargers in a Wild Card playoff game at the Three Rivers Stadium. Being the member of the Pro Football Hall of Fame, Quarterback Terry Bradshaw, recorded high score totals during the game. Despite this performance, the Steelers lost, which ended their postseason that year.

The game began with Chargers RB-James Brooks dropping the opening kickoff at the 3-yard line. Brooks frantically struggled to get control of the ball that was bouncing around on the cold turf as the Steelers special teams was quickly advancing towards him. Unfortunately, for Brooks and the Chargers the ball was recovered by Steelers LB-Guy Ruff in the end zone to give Pittsburgh a quick 7–0 lead after only 12-seconds into the contest. On the ensuing Steelers kickoff, Brooks dropped another return in almost the exact same manner as the first, except this time Brooks was able to recover his fumble after diving on top of the loose ball at the 2-yard line, like it was a live hand grenade.

From there, the Chargers began to turn their misfortunes around by mostly passing the ball for 77-yards on 12-plays and putting some points on the scoreboard after future Chargers Hall of Fame kicker Rolf Benirschke booted a 25-yard field goal to make it a manageable 7–3 game after a disastrous start for the Chargers. However, the Steelers immediately responded with a long touchdown drive of their own that ended with a 1-yard plunge by QB-Terry Bradshaw to give the Steelers their biggest lead of the game 14–3.

Now down by 11-points with 5-minutes left in the 1st-quarter, the Chargers finally handled the kick return without a major incident occurring, then drove the ball down the field resulting in James Brooks self-redeeming 18-yard rushing touchdown early in the 2nd-quarter to make it a 14–10 game, and once again pulling within just 4-points of the Steelers. Then, after a quick Steelers possession and a punt, the Chargers put together a long time consuming offensive drive that came to a disappointing end after CB-Mel Blount recovered a fumble by TE-Kellen Winslow at the Pittsburgh 7-yard line.

With the ball back, Bradshaw drove the Steelers offense to the Chargers 29-yard line, until he threw a long pass that sailed way over the head of a leaping WR-Lynn Swann. The Chargers SS-Bruce Laired intercepted Bradshaw's over thrown pass at the 3-yard line and returned it to their own 35, where San Diego's offense went back to work with 2-minutes left in the half. After Dan Fouts connected with WR-Wes Chandler for a 33-yard reception giving the Chargers a 1st-and-10 at the Steelers 23-yard line. Two plays later, Fouts connected with WR-Scott Fitzkee for a 10-yard TD pass that gave the Chargers a surprising 17–14 half-time lead.

Despite the shocking 1st-half turn of events, the 2nd-half belonged almost entirely to Bradshaw and the Steelers. At one point Bradshaw completed 15 passes in a row, threw 2-TD passes that put the Steelers back in the lead with a commanding 28–17 score early in the 4th-quarter after hitting WR-John Stallworth on a 3rd-and-9 for a 14-yard touchdown. Bradshaw finished his last playoff appearance with 28-completions in 39-attempts for 335-yards, 1-rushing and 2-passing TD's. But, Bradshaw also threw two interceptions, which shifted all the games momentum back to the Chargers who responded with a touchdown each time.

Just prior to Bradshaw throwing his 2nd interception, the Steelers were solidly holding on to a 28–17 lead with 11-minutes remaining in the game. However, when Pittsburgh faced a 3rd-and-8 at their own 20-yrd line, predictably Bradshaw dropped back to pass. Then, after escaping the Chargers aggressive pass rush by moving up into the pocket before scrambling outside to his right where there was no one within 10-yards of him in either direction, and he could've run forward for the 1st-down. However, instead of running for it, Bradshaw slung the ball wildly back across the field toward a well covered Lynn Swann. The pass was easily intercepted by Chargers CB-Jeff Allen and returned to the Steelers 29-yard line.

Despite Bradshaw's reckless 4th-quarter interception, Mel Blount appeared to have saved the Steelers season after intercepting Dan Fouts 19-yard pass attempt into the end zone. However, Blount's 2nd-defensive turnover of the game was nullified by a holding penalty against the defense. With new life, Fouts moved the Chargers offense down the field for their 1st-score in the 2nd-half that came on an 8-yard TD pass to Winslow with 8:50 left in the game, that once again cut the Steelers seemingly insurmountable 11-point lead to within 4-points.

Now feeling the pressure of holding on to a tenuous 28–24 lead, the Steelers needed a solid offensive possession and score to finally secure the win. While the Steelers were able to grind out a few time consuming 1st-downs to get close to midfield, John Goodson, an eighth-round draft pick who replaced veteran Craig Colquitt after he suffered a season-ending injury in the preseason, had to come on to punt. But instead of pinning the Chargers deep, Goodson (a barefoot punter) shanked one for only 20 yards to the Chargers 36-yard line.

With just under 4-minutes remaining and 64-yards away from the end zone, Fouts combined the Chargers passing attack with a balanced rushing attack (which featured RB-Chuck Muncie) to move the ball down the field against the "Steel Curtain" defense. Then, with 1-minute left to play, Fouts threw a 12-yard screen-pass to Winslow for the winning touchdown, making the final score 31–28, and eliminating the Steelers from the tournament.

| Quarter | 1 | 2 | 3 | 4 | Total |
|---|---|---|---|---|---|
| Chargers | 3 | 14 | 0 | 14 | 31 |
| Steelers | 14 | 0 | 7 | 7 | 28 |

at Three Rivers Stadium, Pittsburgh, Pennsylvania

- Date: January 9, 1983
- Game time: 12:30 pm EST
- Game weather: 32 °F (0 °C), wind chill 23 °F (−5 °C)
- Game attendance: 53,546
- Referee: Bob Frederic
- TV announcers (NBC): Dick Enberg & Merlin Olsen
- Pro-Football-Reference.com

Game information

First quarter

- PIT – Guy Ruff recovered fumble in end zone (Gary Anderson kick)
- SD – Rolf Benirschke 25-yard field goal
- PIT – Terry Bradshaw 1-yard run (Gary Anderson kick)

Second quarter

- SD – James Brooks 18-yard run (Rolf Benirschke kick)
- SD – Eric Sievers 10-yard pass from Dan Fouts (Rolf Benirschke kick)

Third quarter

- PIT – Bennie Cunningham 2-yard pass from Terry Bradshaw (Gary Anderson kick)

Fourth quarter

- PIT – John Stallworth 14-yard pass from Terry Bradshaw (Gary Anderson kick)
- SD – Kellen Winslow 8-yard pass from Dan Fouts (Rolf Benirschke kick)
- SD – Kellen Winslow 12-yard pass from Dan Fouts (Rolf Benirschke kick)

Chargers

- Dan Fouts
  27/42, 333 Yds, 3 TD
- Chuck Muncie
  25 Rush, 126 Yds
- Wes Chandler
  9 Rec, 124 Yds

Steelers

- Terry Bradshaw
  28/39, 325 Yds, 2 TD, 2 INT
- Franco Harris
  10 Rush, 35 Yds
- John Stallworth
  8 Rec, 116 Yds, TD
