= 1982–83 NFL playoffs =

American football tournament

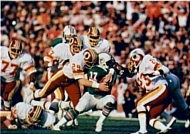
- The Washington Redskins' defense stopping a Miami Dolphins running play in Super Bowl XVII
- Dates: January 8–30, 1983
- Season: 1982
- Teams: 16
- Games played: 15
- Super Bowl XVII site: Rose Bowl; Pasadena, California, U.S.
- Defending champions: San Francisco 49ers (did not qualify)
- Champion: Washington Redskins (3rd title)
- Runner-up: Miami Dolphins
- Conference runners-up: Dallas Cowboys; New York Jets
NFL playoffs
| ← 1981–82 | 1983–84 → |
- Because a player's strike shortened the 1982 regular season to 9 games, the NFL adopted a special 16-team playoff tournament

The National Football League playoffs for the 1982 season began on January 8, 1983. The postseason tournament concluded with the Washington Redskins defeating the Miami Dolphins in Super Bowl XVII, 27–17, on January 30, at the Rose Bowl in Pasadena, California.

A players' strike reduced the regular season to nine games. Thus, the league used a special 16-team playoff format (dubbed the "Super Bowl Tournament"), just for this year. Division standings were ignored (although each division did send at least one team to the playoffs). Eight teams from each conference were seeded 1–8 based on their regular-season records.

Because of the eight-game first round, this was the first time that NFL playoff games were regionally televised across the United States instead of nationwide. The NFL could have televised all eight games nationwide had it scheduled one game in each conference in the four broadcast windows; instead, AFC games were held late Saturday and early Sunday, with NFC games played early Saturday and late Sunday. (Since the 2022-23 NFL season, one first round playoff game is regionally televised in the primary markets only of the two playing teams, with the game available via streaming nationwide.) This year was also the only season in which the conference championship games were played on separate days, although the NFL has announced in case both conference championship games are held in the same city, with the two teams that share a stadium (in East Rutherford, New Jersey or Inglewood, California), one conference championship game would be played on Saturday and the other played on a Sunday.

With the altered format and expanded playoff field, this season saw the first playoff berths given to teams with losing records (win percentage < .500), as both Cleveland and Detroit finished with 4–5 records (.444). Both teams lost in the first round of the playoffs. Since then, the 2010 Seattle Seahawks, 2014 Carolina Panthers, 2020 Washington Football Team, 2022 Tampa Bay Buccaneers, and 2025 Panthers have won their division with losing records, with the 2010 Seahawks becoming the first sub-.500 team to make the playoffs in a full-length season and becoming the first sub-.500 team to win a playoff game.

The expanded playoff format made it possible for a team to host three games in the postseason, which Washington and Miami both did. Under the typical playoff format at the time, this was not possible as all wild-card round winners would always play away games in the divisional round. With the expansion to fourteen playoff teams starting in 2020–21, it is once again possible for a team to host three playoff games in the same season. This was first exemplified in the 2021 Kansas City Chiefs.

== Participants ==
Under the special 16-team postseason "Super Bowl Tournament" used for the 1982 strike-shortened season, the top eight teams from each conference qualified for the playoffs, and were seeded 1–8, regardless of division. Like previous seasons, the NFL did not use a fixed bracket playoff system: in each conference during the first three rounds, the surviving club with the best seed hosted the lowest surviving seed. For Super Bowl XVII, the championship round of the playoffs, the designated home team was still based on the annual rotation by conference (NFC for this season).

Playoff seeds
| Seed | AFC | NFC |
|---|---|---|
| 1 | Los Angeles Raiders | Washington Redskins |
| 2 | Miami Dolphins | Dallas Cowboys |
| 3 | Cincinnati Bengals | Green Bay Packers |
| 4 | Pittsburgh Steelers | Minnesota Vikings |
| 5 | San Diego Chargers | Atlanta Falcons |
| 6 | New York Jets | St. Louis Cardinals |
| 7 | New England Patriots | Tampa Bay Buccaneers |
| 8 | Cleveland Browns | Detroit Lions |

== Bracket ==
Jan 9 – Riverfront Stadium
6 | NY Jets | 44 | Jan 15 – Los Angeles Memorial Coliseum
3 | Cincinnati | 17
Jan 8 – Los Angeles Memorial Coliseum | 6 | NY Jets | 17
1 | LA Raiders | 14
8 | Cleveland | 10 | AFC | Jan 23 – Miami Orange Bowl
1 | LA Raiders | 27
Jan 9 – Three Rivers Stadium | 6 | NY Jets | 0
2 | Miami | 14
5 | San Diego | 31 | Jan 16 – Miami Orange Bowl | AFC Championship
4 | Pittsburgh | 28
Jan 8 – Miami Orange Bowl | 5 | San Diego | 13
2 | Miami | 34
7 | New England | 13
2 | Miami | 28 | Jan 30 – Rose Bowl
First Round playoffs | Second Round playoffs | A2 | Miami | 17
N1 | Washington | 27
Jan 8 – Lambeau Field | Super Bowl XVII
6 | St. Louis | 16 | Jan 16 – Texas Stadium
3 | Green Bay | 41
Jan 9 – Texas Stadium | 3 | Green Bay | 26
2 | Dallas | 37
7 | Tampa Bay | 17 | NFC
Jan 22 – RFK Stadium
2 | Dallas | 30
Jan 9 – Hubert H. Humphrey Metrodome | 2 | Dallas | 17
1 | Washington | 31
5 | Atlanta | 24 | Jan 15 – RFK Stadium | NFC Championship
4 | Minnesota | 30
Jan 8 – RFK Stadium | 4 | Minnesota | 7
1 | Washington | 21
8 | Detroit | 7
1 | Washington | 31

== Schedule ==
In the United States, CBS televised the NFC playoff games, while NBC broadcast the AFC games and Super Bowl XVII.

The players' strike and the reduced regular season caused the playoffs and Super Bowl to be delayed by one week than what they were originally scheduled for (the playoffs in the 1980s usually began at or near the last weekend of December). Because of the eight-game first round, this was the first time that NFL playoff games were regionally televised across the United States instead of nationwide. The league still used the two traditional weekend 12:30 p.m. and 4:00 p.m. EST time slots, and did not hold prime time postseason games until the 2001–02 playoffs. Furthermore, scheduling conflicts with college basketball on CBS that had been previously set before the NFL playoffs were rescheduled following the resumption of play forced the conference championship games to be played on separate days.

| Round | Away team | Score | Home team | Date | Kickoff (ET / UTC−5) | TV |
|---|---|---|---|---|---|---|
| First Round playoffs | Detroit Lions | 7–31 | Washington Redskins | January 8, 1983 | 12:30 p.m. | CBS (regional coverage) |
| First Round playoffs | St. Louis Cardinals | 16–41 | Green Bay Packers | January 8, 1983 | 12:30 p.m. | CBS (regional coverage) |
| First Round playoffs | New England Patriots | 13–28 | Miami Dolphins | January 8, 1983 | 4:00 p.m. | NBC (regional coverage) |
| First Round playoffs | Cleveland Browns | 10–27 | Los Angeles Raiders | January 8, 1983 | 4:00 p.m. | NBC (regional coverage) |
| First Round playoffs | New York Jets | 44–17 | Cincinnati Bengals | January 9, 1983 | 12:30 p.m. | NBC (regional coverage) |
| First Round playoffs | San Diego Chargers | 31–28 | Pittsburgh Steelers | January 9, 1983 | 12:30 p.m. | NBC (regional coverage) |
| First Round playoffs | Tampa Bay Buccaneers | 17–30 | Dallas Cowboys | January 9, 1983 | 4:00 p.m. | CBS (regional coverage) |
| First Round playoffs | Atlanta Falcons | 24–30 | Minnesota Vikings | January 9, 1983 | 4:00 p.m. | CBS (regional coverage) |
| Second Round playoffs | Minnesota Vikings | 7–21 | Washington Redskins | January 15, 1983 | 12:30 p.m. | CBS |
| Second Round playoffs | New York Jets | 17–14 | Los Angeles Raiders | January 15, 1983 | 4:00 p.m. | NBC |
| Second Round playoffs | San Diego Chargers | 13–34 | Miami Dolphins | January 16, 1983 | 12:30 p.m. | NBC |
| Second Round playoffs | Green Bay Packers | 26–37 | Dallas Cowboys | January 16, 1983 | 4:00 p.m. | CBS |
| Conference championships | Dallas Cowboys | 17–31 | Washington Redskins | January 22, 1983 | 12:30 p.m. | CBS |
| Conference championships | New York Jets | 0–14 | Miami Dolphins | January 23, 1983 | 12:30 p.m. | NBC |
| Super Bowl XVII Rose Bowl Pasadena, California | Miami Dolphins | 17–27 | Washington Redskins | January 30, 1983 | 6:00 p.m. | NBC |

== First Round playoffs ==
=== Saturday, January 8, 1983 ===
==== NFC: Washington Redskins 31, Detroit Lions 7 ====
Detroit Lions vs. Washington Redskins – Game summary

| Quarter | 1 | 2 | 3 | 4 | Total |
|---|---|---|---|---|---|
| Lions | 0 | 0 | 7 | 0 | 7 |
| Redskins | 10 | 14 | 7 | 0 | 31 |

at Robert F. Kennedy Memorial Stadium, Washington, D.C.

- Game time: 12:30 p.m. EST
- Game weather: 46 °F (8 °C), cloudy
- Game attendance: 55,045
- Referee: Tom Dooley
- TV announcers (CBS): Dick Stockton (play-by-play) and Roger Staubach (color commentator)

Game information

First quarter

- WAS – Jeris White 77-yard interception return (Mark Moseley kick). Redskins 7–0.
- WAS – Mark Moseley 26-yard field goal. Redskins 10–0.

Second quarter

- WAS – Alvin Garrett 21-yard pass from Joe Theismann (Mark Moseley kick). Redskins 17–0.
- WAS – Alvin Garrett 21-yard pass from Joe Theismann (Mark Moseley kick). Redskins 24–0.

Third quarter

- WAS – Alvin Garrett 27-yard pass from Joe Theismann (Mark Moseley kick). Redskins 31–0.
- DET – David Hill 15-yard pass from Eric Hipple (Eddie Murray kick). Redskins 31–7.

Fourth quarter

- No scoring plays.

Top passers

- DET – Eric Hipple – 22/38, 281 yards, TD, 2 INT
- WAS – Joe Theismann – 14/19, 210 yards, 3 TD

Top rushers

- DET – Eric Hipple – 6 rushes, 47 yards
- WAS – John Riggins – 25 rushes, 119 yards

Top receivers

- DET – Leonard Thompson – 7 receptions, 150 yards
- WAS – Alvin Garrett – 6 receptions, 110 yards, 3 TD

The Redskins jumped to a 24–0 lead en route to an easy 31–7 victory over the Lions, who were in their first postseason game since 1970. Washington receiver Alvin Garrett, who caught only one pass during the regular season, recorded six receptions for 110 yards and three touchdowns. Fullback John Riggins led the team on the ground with 119 rushing yards. Quarterback Joe Theismann compiled 210 passing yards and three touchdowns. While the Redskins only outgained the Lions by two yards (366 to 364), they intercepted two passes and recovered three fumbles, while losing no turnovers themselves.

The game seemed to start well for Detroit, as they reached the Redskins 21-yard line on their opening drive. But halfback Billy Sims lost a fumble that was recovered by Washington linebacker Rich Milot. The next time the Lions had the ball, Jeris White intercepted a pass intended for Sims and returned it 77 yards for a touchdown, the second longest interception return in NFL playoff history. Then on their third possession, quarterback Eric Hipple was sacked by blitzing cornerback Vernon Dean causing a fumble that defensive tackle Darryl Grant recovered on the Redskins 19-yard line. This set up Mark Moseley's 26-yard field goal to make the score 10–0 with just over two minutes left in the first quarter.

Washington increased their lead to 17–0 early in the second quarter with Theismann's 21-yard touchdown pass to Garrett. Detroit responded with a drive to the Redskins 5-yard line, but came up empty again when Dave Butz forced a fumble from Sims that was recovered by defensive end Dexter Manley. Washington then drove 96 yards to score on Garrett's second 21-yard touchdown catch, giving the team a 24–0 first half lead.

In the third quarter, Washington essentially put the game away with a 5-play, 74-yard drive that ended with Garrett's third touchdown of the day, this one a 27-yard catch, making the lead 31–0. Meanwhile, all Detroit could do was avoid a shutout on Hipple's 15-yard touchdown pass to tight end David Hill, the Lions' first playoff score since the 1957 NFL Championship Game.

Lions receiver Leonard Thompson was the top performer for his team with seven receptions for 150 yards.

This was the first postseason meeting between the Lions and Redskins.

The same teams met in the same stadium nine years later for the NFC championship, with the Redskins routing the Lions 41–10 en route to the Super Bowl XXVI title.

The teams would meet a third time in 1999, with Washington winning again 27–13.

==== NFC: Green Bay Packers 41, St. Louis Cardinals 16 ====
St. Louis Cardinals vs. Green Bay Packers – Game summary

| Quarter | 1 | 2 | 3 | 4 | Total |
|---|---|---|---|---|---|
| Cardinals | 3 | 6 | 0 | 7 | 16 |
| Packers | 7 | 21 | 10 | 3 | 41 |

at Lambeau Field, Green Bay, Wisconsin

- Game time: 12:30 p.m. EST/11:30 a.m. CST
- Game weather: 26 °F (−3 °C), overcast
- Game attendance: 54,282
- Referee: Fred Wyant
- TV announcers (CBS): Tim Ryan (play-by-play) and Johnny Morris (color commentator)

Game information

First quarter

- STL – Neil O'Donoghue 18-yard field goal. Cardinals 3–0.
- GB – John Jefferson 60-yard pass from Lynn Dickey (Jan Stenerud kick). Packers 7–3.

Second quarter

- GB – James Lofton 20-yard pass from Lynn Dickey (Jan Stenerud kick). Packers 14–3.
- GB – Eddie Lee Ivery 2-yard run (Jan Stenerud kick). Packers 21–3.
- GB – Eddie Lee Ivery 4-yard pass from Lynn Dickey (Jan Stenerud kick). Packers 28–3.
- STL – Pat Tilley 5-yard pass from Neil Lomax (kick blocked). Packers 28–9.

Third quarter

- GB – Jan Stenerud 46-yard field goal. Packers 31–9.
- GB – John Jefferson 7-yard pass from Lynn Dickey (Jan Stenerud kick). Packers 38–9.

Fourth quarter

- GB – Jan Stenerud 34-yard field goal. Packers 41–9.
- STL – Mike Shumann 18-yard pass from Neil Lomax (Neil O'Donoghue kick). Packers 41–16.

Top passers

- STL – Neil Lomax – 32/51, 385 yards, 2 TD, 2 INT
- GB – Lynn Dickey – 17/23, 260 yards, 4 TD

Top rushers

- STL – Ottis Anderson – 8 rushes, 58 yards
- GB – Eddie Lee Ivery – 13 rushes, 67 yards, TD

Top receivers

- STL – Roy Green – 9 receptions, 113 yards
- GB – John Jefferson – 6 receptions, 148 yards, 2 TD

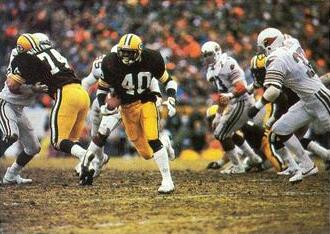
Packers' running back Ivery (40) rushing the ball through the Cardinals' defense in the NFC First Round playoff game.

In the first playoff game at Lambeau Field since the Ice Bowl in 1967, Green Bay quarterback Lynn Dickey threw for 260 yards and four touchdowns en route to a 41–16 win. The Packers scored four touchdowns on four consecutive possessions and finished the game with 453 yards. It was their first playoff victory since Super Bowl II in 1968, as well as the Packers only playoff win in the twenty-five seasons from 1968 to 1992.

Cardinals kicker Neil O'Donoghue gave the team a 3–0 lead with an 18-yard field goal on their opening drive, however this would be the extent of his success. By the end of the game, he missed attempts from 44 and 45 yards, while also having a 44-yard attempt and an extra point kick blocked, both by Packers tight end Gary Lewis. Meanwhile, Green Bay responded to his field goal with a 60-yard touchdown pass from Dickey to receiver John Jefferson.

There would be no more scoring until 5:45 remained in the half, when the Packers suddenly buried St. Louis with three consecutive touchdowns. First, Cardinals safety Benny Perrin slipped while covering James Lofton in the end zone, and Dickey threw him the ball for a 20-yard score. Then Packers linebacker George Cumby recovered Stump Mitchell's fumble on the Packers 39. Dickey's subsequently completed a 30-yard pass to Jefferson and Eddie Lee Ivery broke off an 18-yard run before finishing the drive with a 2-yard rushing score. Two plays later, safety Mark Murphy intercepted Neil Lomax's pass and returned it 22 yards to the Cardinals 12-yard line, setting up Dickey's 4-yard touchdown toss to Ivery that gave Green Bay a 28–3 lead. St. Louis managed to respond with Lomax's 5-yard touchdown pass to Pat Tilley with nine seconds left in the half, but Lewis blocked the extra point, and their 28–9 halftime deficit ended up being as close as the score would ever get.

Green Bay increased their lead to 31–9 with Jan Stenerud's 46-yard field goal on their opening drive of the second half. In the final minute of the third quarter, they went up 38–9 on Dickey's fourth touchdown pass of the day, a 7-yarder to Jefferson at the end of an 89-yard drive that included a 43-yard pass interference penalty against defensive back Carl Allen. In the fourth quarter, Stenerud kicked a 34-yard field goal, while Lomax closed out the scoring on an 18-yard touchdown pass to receiver Mike Shumann with 8:13 left in regulation.

By the end of the game, the Packers had set numerous franchise post season records, including most touchdown passes in a game (4), most receiving yards (6 receptions for 148 yards by Jefferson), and longest field goal (46 yards by Stenerud).

Cardinals receiver Roy Green caught nine passes for 113 yards. Lomax completed 32 of 51 passes for 385 yards and two touchdowns, but was intercepted twice and sacked five times, twice by defensive end Mike Butler.

This was the Cardinals' last postseason game representing St. Louis. The franchise relocated to Arizona in 1988 and did not return to the playoffs until 1998. The city of St. Louis would not be represented again in the NFL postseason until the Rams, who moved to the city in 1995, won Super Bowl XXXIV following the 1999 season.

This was the first postseason meeting between the Cardinals and Packers.

==== AFC: Miami Dolphins 28, New England Patriots 13 ====
New England Patriots vs. Miami Dolphins – Game summary

| Quarter | 1 | 2 | 3 | 4 | Total |
|---|---|---|---|---|---|
| Patriots | 0 | 3 | 3 | 7 | 13 |
| Dolphins | 0 | 14 | 7 | 7 | 28 |

at Miami Orange Bowl, Miami, Florida, U.S.

- Game time: 4:00 p.m. EST
- Game weather: 76 °F (24 °C), cloudy, occasional showers
- Game attendance: 68,842
- Referee: Gordon McCarter
- TV announcers (NBC): Bob Costas (play-by-play), Bob Trumpy, and Bob Griese (color commentators)

Game information

First quarter

- No scoring plays.

Second quarter

- NE – John Smith 23-yard field goal. Patriots 3–0.
- MIA – Bruce Hardy 2-yard pass from David Woodley (Uwe von Schamann kick). Dolphins 7–3.
- MIA – Andra Franklin 1-yard run (Uwe von Schamann kick). Dolphins 14–3.

Third quarter

- NE – John Smith 42-yard field goal. Dolphins 14–6.
- MIA – Woody Bennett 2-yard run (Uwe von Schamann kick). Dolphins 21–6.

Fourth quarter

- MIA – Bruce Hardy 2-yard pass from David Woodley (Uwe von Schamann kick). Dolphins 28–6.
- NE – Don Hasselbeck 22-yard pass from Steve Grogan (John Smith kick). Dolphins 28–13.

Top passers

- NE – Steve Grogan – 16/30, 189 yards, TD, 2 INT
- MIA – David Woodley – 16/19, 246 yards, 2 TD

Top rushers

- NE – Mark van Eeghen – 9 rushes, 40 yards
- MIA – Andra Franklin – 26 rushes, 112 yards, TD

Top receivers

- NE – Don Hasselbeck – 7 receptions, 87 yards, TD
- MIA – Tony Nathan – 5 receptions, 68 yards

This first round playoff game featured a rematch of the infamous Snowplow Game earlier in the regular season, replete with a pregame reenactment of the kick. The Dolphins controlled most of the game with four long touchdown drives, and intercepted Patriots quarterback Steve Grogan twice. Miami's mobile quarterback David Woodley had one of the best performances of his career, completing 16 of 19 passes for 246 yards and two touchdowns (both to tight end Bruce Hardy) with no interceptions, while also rushing for 16 yards. Woodley's passer rating for this game was 153.8. Miami running back Andra Franklin had 26 carries for 112 yards and a touchdown. Miami significantly outgained New England in total yards (448 to 237) and rushing yards (214 to 77).

After a quiet and scoreless first quarter, New England took a 3–0 lead three minutes into the second quarter with a drive sustained by the rushing of Mark van Eeghen and capped off by John Smith's 23-yard field goal, but it would last just five minutes before Woodley finished a 76-yard drive with a 2-yard play action touchdown pass to tight end Bruce Hardy. The next time Miami had the ball, they drove 79 yards balancing Miami's running game and Woodley's passing and scrambling to culminate with a 1-yard touchdown run by Franklin, giving the home team a 14–3 halftime lead with the Miami pass rush snuffing out the Patriots' offensive efforts.

The Patriots, who lost their 15th consecutive game in the Orange Bowl and struggling with the absence of star Defensive End Kenneth Sims, were on the verge of getting blown out as Miami drove down the field with their power running game led by Franklin and Tony Nathan, but a red zone fumble gave New England the ball at the Miami 37, and a Grogan to Lin Dawson pass helped the Patriots reduced the lead to 14–6 on Smith's 42-yard field goal early in the third quarter. That would be as close to a lead as the Patriots would get, as the Dolphins scored again with touchdowns from Woody Bennett and then another 2-yard catch by Hardy late in the third quarter off a play-action pass by Woodley in the middle of the fourth. Grogan rallied the Patriots to throw a 22-yard touchdown pass to tight end Don Hasselbeck With 5:32 left in the game, but a late Patriots interception sealed the final score at 28–13.

This was the first postseason meeting between the Patriots and Dolphins.

==== AFC: Los Angeles Raiders 27, Cleveland Browns 10 ====
Cleveland Browns vs. Los Angeles Raiders – Game summary

| Quarter | 1 | 2 | 3 | 4 | Total |
|---|---|---|---|---|---|
| Browns | 0 | 10 | 0 | 0 | 10 |
| Raiders | 3 | 10 | 7 | 7 | 27 |

at Los Angeles Memorial Coliseum, Los Angeles, California

- Game time: 4:00 p.m. EST/1:00 p.m. PST
- Game weather: 77 °F (25 °C), cloudy
- Game attendance: 56,555
- Referee: Bob McElwee
- TV announcers (NBC): Don Criqui (play-by-play) and John Brodie (color commentator)

Game information

First quarter

- RAI – Chris Bahr 27-yard field goal. Raiders 3–0.

Second quarter

- CLE – Matt Bahr 52-yard field goal. Tied 3–3.
- RAI – Marcus Allen 2-yard run (Chris Bahr kick). Raiders 10–3.
- CLE – Ricky Feacher 43-yard pass from Paul McDonald (Matt Bahr kick). Tied 10–10.
- RAI – Chris Bahr 37-yard field goal. Raiders 13–10.

Third quarter

- RAI – Marcus Allen 3-yard run (Chris Bahr kick). Raiders 20–10.

Fourth quarter

- RAI – Frank Hawkins 1-yard run (Chris Bahr kick). Raiders 27–10.

Top passers

- CLE – Paul McDonald – 18/37, 281 yards, TD
- RAI – Jim Plunkett – 24/37, 386 yards, 2 INT

Top rushers

- CLE – Charles White – 9 rush, 30 yards
- RAI – Marcus Allen – 15 rushes, 72 yards, 2 TD

Top receivers

- CLE – Ricky Feacher – 4 receptions, 124 yards, TD
- RAI – Cliff Branch – 5 receptions, 121 yards

The Raiders gained 510 total yards of offense and held the Browns to 284. Faced with a hard-fought 10–10 tie late in the second quarter, the Raiders scored 17 unanswered points and shut Cleveland out in the second half. Quarterback Jim Plunkett threw for 386 yards, while running back Marcus Allen rushed for 72 yards, caught six passes for 74 yards, and scored two touchdowns. Receiver Cliff Branch caught five passes for 121 yards, while tight end Todd Christensen caught six passes for 93. Linebacker Rod Martin and defensive tackle Johnny Robinson each had two of LA's six sacks.

On the Raiders first drive, Plunkett's 64-yard completion to Branch set up a 27-yard field goal from Chris Bahr. Their next two drives ended with Plunkett being intercepted, first by Browns defensive back Clarence Scott and later by Hanford Dixon. However, both picks were in Cleveland territory and the Browns could not convert either into points. On Dixon's interception, they managed to reach midfield before linebacker Ted Hendricks sacked Browns quarterback Paul McDonald for a 10-yard loss, bringing up third down and 16. McDonald completed a 15-yard pass to Dwight Walker on the next play, but on a fourth down conversion attempt, linebacker Matt Millen and defensive tackle Lyle Alzado stuffed running back Mike Pruitt for no gain. Los Angeles took over and drove to the Browns 11-yard line, featuring a 34-yard reception by Allen. But linebacker Clay Matthews sacked Plunkett for a 9-yard loss, and following a third down completion, Bahr missed a field goal attempt from 35 yards.

On their first drive of the second quarter, Cleveland managed to tie the game with McDonald's 47-yard completion to Ricky Feacher setting up Matt Bahr's franchise playoff record 52-yard field goal. But Los Angeles quickly stormed back with an 88-yard scoring drive. Plunkett completed five passes on the way to the end zone, including a pair of 24-yarders to Christensen and Branch, while Allen finished the drive a 2-yard touchdown run to give the Raiders a 10–3 lead. With 2:01 left in the half, Cleveland tied the game at the end of a 76-yard drive with McDonald's 43-yard touchdown pass to Feacher. But aided by Greg Pruitt's 40-yard kickoff return to the Raiders 40, Plunkett was able to get his team into scoring range, completing three passes for 26 yards and rushing for 11. Chris Bahr kicked a 37-yard field goal on the last play of the quarter, giving LA a 13–10 lead going into halftime.

Cleveland took the opening kickoff and drove to the Raiders 14-yard line. But in what turned out to be the crucial play of the game, running back Charles White lost a fumble that was recovered by linebacker Jeff Barnes. After the turnover, LA drove 89 yards and increased their lead to 20–10 on Allen's 3-yard touchdown run. Cleveland would never mount a serious scoring threat for the rest of the game. In the fourth quarter, Los Angeles essentially put it out of reach with a 65-yard drive, including Plunkett's completions to Malcolm Barnwell for 26 yards and Branch for 15, that ended with a 1-yard touchdown run by Frank Hawkins, making the final score 27–10.

McDonald completed 18 of 37 passes for 281 yards and a touchdown. His top target was Feacher, who caught four passes for 124 yards and a score. Cleveland fell to 0–2 in playoff games at the Los Angeles Coliseum, joining a setback to the Rams in the 1951 NFL Championship Game.

This was the second postseason meeting between the Browns and Raiders. The then-Oakland Raiders won the only previous meeting.

Previous playoff games
Los Angeles/ Oakland Raiders leads 1–0 in all-time playoff games

1980

Oakland Raiders 14 @ Cleveland Browns 12

1980 AFC Divisional playoffs

=== Sunday, January 9, 1983 ===
==== AFC: New York Jets 44, Cincinnati Bengals 17 ====
New York Jets vs. Cincinnati Bengals – Game summary

| Quarter | 1 | 2 | 3 | 4 | Total |
|---|---|---|---|---|---|
| Jets | 3 | 17 | 3 | 21 | 44 |
| Bengals | 14 | 0 | 3 | 0 | 17 |

at Riverfront Stadium, Cincinnati, Ohio

- Game time: 12:30 p.m. EST
- Game weather: 38 °F (3 °C), cloudy, drizzle
- Game attendance: 57,560
- Referee: Chuck Heberling
- TV announcers (NBC): Charlie Jones (play-by-play) and Len Dawson (color commentator)

Game information

First quarter

- CIN – Isaac Curtis 32-yard pass from Ken Anderson (Jim Breech kick). Bengals 7–0.
- NYJ – Pat Leahy 33-yard field goal. Bengals 7–3.
- CIN – Dan Ross 2-yard pass from Ken Anderson (Jim Breech kick). Bengals 14–3.

Second quarter

- NYJ – Derrick Gaffney 14-yard pass from Freeman McNeil (Pat Leahy kick). Bengals 14–10.
- NYJ – Wesley Walker 4-yard pass from Richard Todd (Pat Leahy kick). Jets 17–14.
- NYJ – Pat Leahy 24-yard field goal. Jets 20–14.

Third quarter

- NYJ – Pat Leahy 47-yard field goal. Jets 23–14.
- CIN – Jim Breech 20-yard field goal. Jets 23–17.

Fourth quarter

- NYJ – Freeman McNeil 20-yard run (Pat Leahy kick). Jets 30–17.
- NYJ – Darrol Ray 98-yard interception return (Pat Leahy kick). Jets 37–17.
- NYJ – Dwayne Crutchfield 1-yard run (Pat Leahy kick). Jets 44–17.

Top passers

- NYJ – Richard Todd – 20/28, 269 yards, TD, INT
- CIN – Ken Anderson – 26/35, 354 yards, 2 TD, 3 INT

Top rushers

- NYJ – Freeman McNeil – 21 rushes, 202 yards, TD
- CIN – Pete Johnson – 9 rushes, 26 yards

Top receivers

- NYJ – Wesley Walker – 8 receptions, 145 yards, TD
- CIN – Cris Collinsworth – 7 receptions, 120 yards

The underdog Jets, playing their first road playoff game in franchise history, overcame an early 14–3 deficit against the defending AFC champions by racking up 517 yards of offense and scoring 21 points in the fourth quarter. Running back Freeman McNeil led the Jets to a victory with 210 rushing yards (an NFL playoff record, surpassing the old one of 206 by Keith Lincoln in the 1963 AFL playoffs) and a touchdown, while also catching a pass for nine yards and throwing a touchdown pass on a halfback option play. Receiver Wesley Walker caught eight passes for 145 yards and a touchdown. Jets quarterback Richard Todd completed 20 of 28 passes for 269 yards and a touchdown. Playing in the final postseason game of his legendary career, Bengals quarterback Ken Anderson completed 26 of 35 passes for a career playoff high 354 yards and two touchdowns, but was intercepted three times. Receiver Cris Collinsworth caught seven passes for 120 yards. This was New York's first playoff win since Super Bowl III in the 1968 season.

Cincinnati opened up the scoring with an 81-yard drive that ended with Anderson's 32-yard touchdown pass to Isaac Curtis. New York responded with Todd's 49-yard completion to Walker that set up a 32-yard field goal by Pat Leahy and cut the score to 7–3. Cincinnati found themselves facing third down and 30 on their ensuing possession, but it didn't stop them from picking up a first down with Anderson's 53-yard pass to Collinsworth, and he later finished the drive with a 2-yard touchdown pass to tight end Dan Ross, giving the Bengals a 14–3 lead at the end of the first quarter.

New York responded by driving 80 yards in 10 plays to cut the score to 14–10 with McNeil's 14-yard touchdown throw to Derrick Gaffney on a halfback option pass. Cincinnati countered with a 75-yard drive to the Jets' 10-yard line, but Johnnie Lynn's interception on the 1 eliminated the scoring chance and resulted in a huge reversal of momentum. After the turnover, New York moved the ball 85 yards in 11 plays, featuring a 24-yard run by McNeil. Todd finished the drive with a 4-yard touchdown pass to Walker, giving New York a 17–14 lead. Then after a punt, Todd's 44-yard completion to Walker set up a 25-yard Leahy field goal, making the score 20–14 going into halftime.

On the opening drive of the second half, McNeil's 35-yard run gave the Jets a first down on the Cincinnati 27-yard line. But on the next play, Todd threw a pass that was deflected by Glenn Cameron and intercepted by Ken Riley. Following a punt, McNeil's 33-yard run put New York on the Bengals' 30, and this time the team managed to cash in with a 47-yard Leahy field goal, giving them a 23–14 lead. Anderson led the Bengals back, completing passes to Ross and Steve Kreider for gains of 25 and 17 yards as the team drove 75 yards to score on Jim Breech's 20-yard field goal. So despite giving up 20 unanswered points, the Bengals were only trailing 23–17. And on the last play of the third quarter, Bengals safety Bobby Kemp forced a fumble from Gaffney that cornerback Mike Fuller recovered and returned 20 yards to the Jets' 35.

However, the Bengals self-destructed in the fourth quarter, suffering one of the worst collapses in franchise history. After catching a 9-yard pass, Bengals running back Pete Johnson failed to pick up the first down with consecutive runs, and Breech missed a 46-yard field goal attempt. New York then drove 72 yards to go up 30–17 on McNeil's 20-yard touchdown run. On the first play of the Bengals' ensuing drive, Anderson threw a 69-yard touchdown pass to Collinsworth, only to see it wiped out by a false start penalty on right tackle Mike Wilson. Cincinnati still managed to drive to the Jets' 6-yard line, but then had another touchdown eliminated, this time a 6-yard run by Anderson cancelled out by an illegal motion penalty on Ross. On the next play, Anderson's pass was intercepted by safety Darrol Ray and returned a playoff record 98 yards for a touchdown, giving New York a 37–17 lead with less than 5 minutes left in the game. After Cincinnati got the ball back, Lynn recorded his second interception of the day, returning this one 26 yards to the Bengals' 26, and New York went on to score on the final points of the game with a 1-yard touchdown run by Dwayne Crutchfield.

This was the first postseason meeting between the Jets and Bengals.

==== AFC: San Diego Chargers 31, Pittsburgh Steelers 28 ====
San Diego Chargers at Pittsburgh Steelers – Game summary

| Quarter | 1 | 2 | 3 | 4 | Total |
|---|---|---|---|---|---|
| Chargers | 3 | 14 | 0 | 14 | 31 |
| Steelers | 14 | 0 | 7 | 7 | 28 |

at Three Rivers Stadium, Pittsburgh, Pennsylvania

- Date: January 9
- Game time: 12:30 p.m. EST
- Game weather: 39 °F (3.9 °C), cloudy
- Game attendance: 53,546
- Referee: Bob Frederic
- TV announcers (NBC): Dick Enberg and Merlin Olsen
- Box score

Game information

First quarter

- PIT – Guy Ruff fumble recovery in end zone (Gary Anderson kick). Steelers 7–0.
- SD – Rolf Benirschke 25-yard field goal. Steelers 7–3.
- PIT – Terry Bradshaw 1-yard run (Gary Anderson kick). Steelers 14–3.

Second quarter

- SD – James Brooks 18-yard run (Rolf Benirschke kick). Steelers 14–10.
- SD – Eric Sievers 10-yard pass from Dan Fouts (Rolf Benirschke kick). Chargers 17–14.

Third quarter

- PIT – Bennie Cunningham 2-yard pass from Terry Bradshaw (Gary Anderson kick). Steelers 21–17.

Fourth quarter

- PIT – John Stallworth 14-yard pass from Terry Bradshaw (Gary Anderson kick). Steelers 28–17.
- SD – Kellen Winslow 8-yard pass from Dan Fouts (Rolf Benirschke kick). Steelers 28–24.
- SD – Kellen Winslow 12-yard pass from Dan Fouts (Rolf Benirschke kick). Chargers 31–28.

Top passers

- SD – Dan Fouts – 27/42, 333 yards, 3 TD
- PIT – Terry Bradshaw – 28/39, 325 yards, 2 TD, 2 INT

Top rushers

- SD – Chuck Muncie – 25 rushes, 126 yards
- PIT – Frank Pollard – 9 rushes, 47 yards

Top receivers

- SD – Wes Chandler – 9 receptions, 124 yards
- PIT – John Stallworth – 8 receptions, 116 yards, TD

The game began disastrously for the Chargers when James Brooks fumbled the opening kickoff, which was recovered for a touchdown by Guy Ruff of the Steelers. But San Diego battled back, winning by overcoming an 11-point deficit in the fourth quarter. Quarterback Dan Fouts threw for 333 yards and three touchdowns with no interceptions to lead his team to victory. Quarterback Terry Bradshaw threw for 325 yards and two touchdowns and scored a rushing touchdown in his final postseason game, but was intercepted twice. Chargers running back Chuck Muncie rushed for 126 yards and caught a pass for 12, while tight end Kellen Winslow caught seven passes for 102 yards and two touchdowns. Steelers receiver John Stallworth caught eight passes for 116 yards and a touchdown.

Amazingly, Brooks fumbled the next kickoff after Ruff's touchdown, but he managed to recover it on the 2-yard line. San Diego then drove inside the Steelers red zone where Rolf Benirschke made a 25-yard field goal to cut the score to 7–3. Pittsburgh responded with a 40-yard reception by receiver Jim Smith that set up a 1-yard touchdown run by Bradshaw near the end of the first quarter. In the second quarter, Brooks' 15-yard touchdown cut the score to 14–10. Later on, Fouts' 33-yard completion to Wes Chandler set up his 10-yard touchdown pass to Eric Sievers to give the Chargers a 17–14 lead. The Steelers had a chance to tie or retake the lead with a drive into San Diego territory just before halftime, but Chargers safety Bruce Laird made a clutch interception to prevent them from scoring.

Bradshaw threw a 2-yard touchdown pass to tight end Bennie Cunningham in the third quarter, and later a 9-yard touchdown pass to Stallworth that gave the Steelers a 28–17 lead three plays into the fourth quarter. But this would be the end of his success as he completed only three of his next 11 passes in the final quarter. The next time Pittsburgh had the ball, cornerback Jeff Allen intercepted Bradshaw's pass and returned it eight yards to the Steelers 29 yard line. Mel Blount intercepted a pass in the end zone on the second play of the ensuing drive, but it was eliminated by a holding penalty on linebacker Jack Ham. Five plays later, Fouts cut the score to 28–24 with an 8-yard touchdown pass to Winslow. Following six consecutive handoffs by Bradshaw, San Diego got the ball back on their own 36-yard line due to a 20-yard punt by John Goodson with four minutes left in the game. Four runs by Muncie moved the ball 33 yards to a third and 7 situation on the Steelers 12-yard line. On the next play, Fouts connected with Winslow on a screen pass, and the tight end took it all the way to the end zone for the game winning score with less than a minute left on the clock.

This marked Bradshaw's final appearance at Three Rivers Stadium. He sat out nearly all of the 1983 season with an elbow injury, appearing in just one half of a late-season game against the Jets in what turned out to be their final game at Shea Stadium. The game was also the final one of the career of Hall of Fame linebacker Jack Ham.

This was the first postseason meeting between the Chargers and Steelers.

==== NFC: Dallas Cowboys 30, Tampa Bay Buccaneers 17 ====
Tampa Bay Buccaneers vs. Dallas Cowboys – Game summary

| Quarter | 1 | 2 | 3 | 4 | Total |
|---|---|---|---|---|---|
| Buccaneers | 0 | 10 | 7 | 0 | 17 |
| Cowboys | 6 | 7 | 3 | 14 | 30 |

at Texas Stadium, Irving, Texas

- Game time: 4:00 p.m. EST/3:00 p.m. CST
- Game weather: 65 °F (18 °C), sunny
- Game attendance: 65,042
- Referee: Dick Jorgensen
- TV announcers (CBS): Pat Summerall (play-by-play) and John Madden (color commentator)

Game information

First quarter

- DAL – Rafael Septién 33-yard field goal. Cowboys 3–0.
- DAL – Rafael Septién 33-yard field goal. Cowboys 6–0.

Second quarter

- TB – Hugh Green 60-yard fumble return (Bill Capece kick). Buccaneers 7–6.
- TB – Bill Capece 32-yard field goal. Buccaneers 10–6.
- DAL – Ron Springs 6-yard pass from Danny White (Rafael Septién kick). Cowboys 13–10.

Third quarter

- DAL – Rafael Septién 19-yard field goal. Cowboys 16–10.
- TB – Gordon Jones 49-yard pass from Doug Williams (Bill Capece kick). Buccaneers 17–16.

Fourth quarter

- DAL – Monty Hunter 19-yard interception return (Rafael Septién kick). Cowboys 23–17.
- DAL – Billy Joe DuPree 10-yard pass from Danny White (Rafael Septién kick). Cowboys 30–17.

Top passers

- TB – Doug Williams – 8/28, 113 yards, TD, 3 INT
- DAL – Danny White – 27/45, 312 yards, 2 TD, 2 INT

Top rushers

- TB – James Wilder – 14 rushes, 93 yards
- DAL – Tony Dorsett – 26 rushes, 110 yards

Top receivers

- TB – Kevin House – 4 receptions, 52 yards
- DAL – Drew Pearson – 7 receptions, 95 yards

The Cowboys had 445 yards of total offense and 29 first downs, while their defense held Buccaneers quarterback Doug Williams, playing in his final game in a Bucs uniform, to just eight of 28 completions for 113 yards and intercepted him three times. Dallas running back Tony Dorsett rushed for 110 yards, while kicker Rafael Septién made three field goals.

Two first quarter field goals from Septién gave Dallas an early 6–0 lead before Tampa Bay converted two turnovers into 10 points. First, quarterback Danny White lost a fumble that was recovered in mid air by Bucs linebacker Hugh Green, who took off for a 60-yard touchdown return. The Cowboys responded with a drive to the Tampa Bay 38, but on third down, safety Mark Cotney intercepted White's pass and returned it 50 yards to set up Bill Capece's 32-yard field goal.

Dallas countered with a touchdown on a 6-yard pass from White to Ron Springs, making the score 13–10 going into halftime. They upped their lead to 16–10 in the third quarter on a 19-yard Septién field goal. Tampa Bay responded with an 80-yard drive to retake the lead, 17–16, on Williams' short pass to Gordon Jones, who took it 49 yards to the end zone. But in the fourth quarter, Bucs guard Charley Hannah was penalized 10 yards for an illegal block and then drew an unsportsmanlike conduct penalty for arguing the call with officials, pushing Tampa Bay back to their own 11-yard line. On the next play, rookie defensive back Monty Hunter intercepted Williams' pass and returned it 19 yards for a touchdown, putting Dallas back in front at 23–17. 10 minutes later, the Cowboys put the game away with White's 10-yard touchdown pass to Timmy Newsome.

This was Tampa Bay's last playoff game until 1997, by which time the Buccaneers replaced their orange uniforms. From 1983 to 1996, they suffered 14 consecutive losing seasons, 13 of which saw Tampa Bay lose 10 or more games.

This was the second postseason meeting between the Buccaneers and Cowboys. Dallas won the only previous meeting.

Previous playoff games
Dallas leads 1–0 in all-time playoff games

1981

Tampa Bay Buccaneers 0 @ Dallas Cowboys 38

1981 NFC Divisional playoffs

==== NFC: Minnesota Vikings 30, Atlanta Falcons 24 ====
Atlanta Falcons vs. Minnesota Vikings – Game summary

| Quarter | 1 | 2 | 3 | 4 | Total |
|---|---|---|---|---|---|
| Falcons | 7 | 0 | 14 | 3 | 24 |
| Vikings | 3 | 10 | 3 | 14 | 30 |

at Hubert H. Humphrey Metrodome, Minneapolis, Minnesota

- Game time: 4:00 p.m. EST/3:00 p.m. CST
- Game attendance: 60,560
- Referee: Red Cashion
- TV announcers (CBS): Tom Brookshier (play-by-play) and Wayne Walker (color commentator)

Game information

First quarter

- ATL – Don Rogers recovered blocked punt in end zone (Mick Luckhurst kick). Falcons 7–0.
- MIN – Rick Danmeier 33-yard field goal. Falcons 7–3.

Second quarter

- MIN – Sammy White 36-yard pass from Tommy Kramer (Rick Danmeier kick). Vikings 10–7.
- MIN – Rick Danmeier 30-yard field goal. Vikings 13–7.

Third quarter

- ATL – Mick Luckhurst 17-yard run (Mick Luckhurst kick). Falcons 14–13.
- ATL – Bob Glazebrook 35-yard interception return (Mick Luckhurst kick). Falcons 21–13.
- MIN – Rick Danmeier 39-yard field goal. Falcons 21–16.

Fourth quarter

- MIN – Ahmad Rashad 11-yard pass from Tommy Kramer (Rick Danmeier kick). Vikings 23–21.
- ATL – Mick Luckhurst 41-yard field goal. Falcons 24–23.
- MIN – Ted Brown 5-yard run (Rick Danmeier kick). Vikings 30–24.

Top passers

- ATL – Steve Bartkowski – 9/23, 134 yards, 2 INT
- MIN – Tommy Kramer – 20/34, 253 yards, 2 TD, INT

Top rushers

- ATL – William Andrews – 11 rushes, 48 yards
- MIN – Ted Brown – 23 rushes, 81 yards, TD

Top receivers

- ATL – Alfred Jenkins – 2 receptions, 52 yards
- MIN – Joe Senser – 6 receptions, 81 yards

The Vikings outgained the Falcons in total yards 378–235, but still needed a last second touchdown to win the game. Down by one point with six minutes remaining, they drove 72 yards to score on Ted Brown's game-winning touchdown run with 1:44 left in the game, and then sealed the win with John Turner's interception on the Falcons ensuing possession.

Atlanta scored after the opening series when Vikings punter Greg Coleman fumbled the snap. Coleman recovered the ball and managed to punt it, but linebacker Paul Davis blocked the kick and his teammate Doug Rogers recovered it in the end zone for a touchdown. Later in the quarter, Minnesota took advantage of a 25-yard pass interference penalty against Falcons safety Tom Pridemore by scoring with Rick Danmeier's 33-yard field goal, cutting the score to 7–3.

In the second quarter, the Vikings took a 10–7 lead with a 7-play, 82-yard drive. Quarterback Tommy Kramer completed a 25-yard pass to Sammy White on the possession, and finished it with an 11-yard pass to White in the end zone. The Falcons responded with a drive deep into Vikings territory, but Turner put an end to that by intercepting Steve Bartkowski's pass at the Minnesota 2-yard line. With 30 seconds left in the half, Minnesota increased their lead to 13–7 with a 30-yard Danmeier field goal that was set up by Rufus Bess' 20-yard punt return and Brown's 14-yard run.

Atlanta finished the half with just three completions, while Brown had been temporarily knocked out of the game with a sore shoulder and Turner had been taken to a hospital for X-rays after twisting his ankle. Despite this, both players ended up returning to the game.

The Falcons started off the third quarter with an 8-play, 71-yard drive, including Bartkowski's passes to Floyd Hodge and Alfred Jenkins for gains of 25 and 22 yards. Faced with fourth down on the Vikings 17-yard line, Atlanta managed to fool the Minnesota defense with a fake field goal play. Backup quarterback Mike Moroski, the holder on field goal plays, took the snap and started run right, but then pitched the ball to kicker Mick Luckhurst, who raced 17 yards for a touchdown (the only rush attempt of his career) to give his team a 14–13 lead. The situation got even better for Atlanta just two minutes later when safety Bob Glazebrook intercepted Kramer's pass and returned it 35 yards for a touchdown. However, the Vikings managed to cut their deficit down to one score before the end of the third quarter with a 70-yard drive that included Kramer's 18-yard completion to tight end Joe Senser. Danmeier finished off the series with a 39-yard field goal, making the score 21-16 going into the final quarter.

The Vikings retook the lead in the fourth quarter with a 61-yard drive that included Brown's 3-yard run on fourth and inches and ended with Kramer's 11-yard touchdown throw to receiver Sam McCullum, going up 23–21. But Atlanta stormed right back on a 50-yard drive, featuring a 30-yard reception by Jenkins, to score on a 41-yard Luckhurst field goal.

Now down 24–23 with six minutes left in regulation, Minnesota put together a 72-yard drive for the game winning score. Brown had runs of 11 and 10 yards along the way, while Kramer completed a 19-yard pass to receiver Terry LeCount. On the last play, Brown scored a 5-yard touchdown run to put his team up 30–24 with 1:44 left in the game. Atlanta still had one last chance to drive for a winning touchdown, but after reaching the Vikings 45, Turner intercepted a pass from Bartkowski, enabling the Vikings to run out the clock.

Kramer completed 20 of 34 passes for 253 yards and two touchdowns, with one interception, while also rushing for 13 yards. Bartkowski completed just 9 of 24 passes for 134 yards and was intercepted twice, both times by Turner, who had a hospital trip between them. Bess returned five punts for 65 yards. The Vikings fumbled the ball four times during the game, but recovered each one. Atlanta would not return to the playoffs until the 1991 season.

This was the first postseason meeting between the Falcons and Vikings.

== Second Round playoffs ==
=== Saturday, January 15, 1983 ===
==== NFC: Washington Redskins 21, Minnesota Vikings 7 ====
Minnesota Vikings vs. Washington Redskins – Game summary

| Quarter | 1 | 2 | 3 | 4 | Total |
|---|---|---|---|---|---|
| Vikings | 0 | 7 | 0 | 0 | 7 |
| Redskins | 14 | 7 | 0 | 0 | 21 |

at Robert F. Kennedy Memorial Stadium, Washington, D.C.

- Game time: 12:30 p.m. EST
- Game weather: 44 °F (7 °C), cloudy, breezy
- Game attendance: 54,593
- Referee: Jim Tunney
- TV announcers (CBS): Jack Buck (play-by-play) and Hank Stram (color commentator)

Game information

First quarter

- WAS – Don Warren 3-yard pass from Joe Theismann (Mark Moseley kick). Redskins 7–0.
- WAS – John Riggins 2-yard run (Mark Moseley kick). Redskins 14–0.

Second quarter

- MIN – Ted Brown 18-yard run (Rick Danmeier kick). Redskins 14–7.
- WAS – Alvin Garrett 18-yard pass from Joe Theismann (Mark Moseley kick). Redskins 21–7.

Third quarter

- No scoring plays.

Fourth quarter

- No scoring plays.

Top passers

- MIN – Tommy Kramer – 18/39, 252 yards
- WAS – Joe Theismann – 17/23, 213 yards, 2 TD, INT

Top rushers

- MIN – Ted Brown – 14 rushes, 65 yards, TD
- WAS – John Riggins – 37 rushes, 185 yards, TD

Top receivers

- MIN – Sam McCullum – 3 receptions, 63 yards
- WAS – Alvin Garrett – 7 receptions, 75 yards, TD

Before the game, the Vikings caused controversy when they said that the Redskins offensive line, known as the Hogs, needed to be butchered. 33-year-old running back John Riggins led the Redskins to a victory with 185 rushing yards on 37 carries (both career highs) and a touchdown.

Washington scored their 21 points in the game's first 20 minutes. On their opening drive, Riggins gained 34 yards on seven carries as the team drove 66 yards to score on Joe Theismann's 3-yard touchdown pass to tight end Don Warren. Two possessions later the Redskins drove 71 yards, including Theismann's 46-yard completion to Alvin Garrett on a flea flicker play, and scored on a 2-yard touchdown run by Riggins on fourth down and inches with one minute left in the quarter. At this point, the Vikings had five total yards, no first downs, and held the ball for only two minutes.

The Vikings cut a 14–0 Redskins lead in half early in the second quarter, scoring on Ted Brown's 18-yard touchdown run. But Washington stormed right back to score on Theismann's 18-yard touchdown pass to Garrett.

There would be no more scoring for the rest of the game, despite many opportunities for both teams. Vikings kicker Rick Danmeier missed a 38-yard field goal, while Washington's Mark Moseley also had two misses, from 47 and 39 yards. Moseley, who had become the first kicker to win the NFL MVP award during the year, finished this game having made a total of one of his last five attempts, though his 39-yard miss only occurred after his 29-yard field goal was wiped out by a penalty on teammate Rich Milot.

In the second half, the Vikings had drives to the Washington 39, 28, and 15-yard lines, but failed to score each time. They ended up punting on the drive to the 39, while the other two both ended with failed fourth down conversion attempts, including Redskins' lineman Tony McGee's sack on quarterback Tommy Kramer on fourth and 7 from the 15 that essentially put the game away in the fourth quarter.

In the closing moments of the game, fans at RFK Stadium began chanting "We Want Dallas" indicating their ideal choice of opponent for the NFC Championship Game. They would get their wish. Theismann completed 17 of 23 passes for 213 yards, two touchdowns, and an interception. Kramer completed 18 of 39 passes for 252 yards.

This was the third postseason meeting between the Vikings and Redskins. Minnesota won both previous meetings.

Previous playoff games
Minnesota leads 2–0 in all-time playoff games

1973

Washington Redskins 20 @ Minnesota Vikings 27

1973 NFC Divisional playoffs

1976

Washington Redskins 20 @ Minnesota Vikings 35

1976 NFC Divisional playoffs

==== AFC: New York Jets 17, Los Angeles Raiders 14 ====
New York Jets vs. Los Angeles Raiders – Game summary

| Quarter | 1 | 2 | 3 | 4 | Total |
|---|---|---|---|---|---|
| Jets | 7 | 3 | 0 | 7 | 17 |
| Raiders | 0 | 0 | 14 | 0 | 14 |

at Los Angeles Memorial Coliseum, Los Angeles, California

- Game time: 4:00 p.m. EST/1:00 p.m. PST
- Game weather: 75 °F (24 °C), mostly cloudy
- Game attendance: 90,038
- Referee: Ben Dreith
- TV announcers (NBC): Dick Enberg (play-by-play) and Merlin Olsen (color commentator)

Game information

First quarter

- NYJ – Wesley Walker 20-yard pass from Richard Todd (Pat Leahy kick). Jets 7–0.

Second quarter

- NYJ – Pat Leahy 30-yard field goal. Jets 10–0.

Third quarter

- RAI – Marcus Allen 3-yard run Chris Bahr kick. Jets 10–7.
- RAI – Malcolm Barnwell 57-yard pass from Jim Plunkett (Chris Bahr kick). Raiders 14–10.

Fourth quarter

- NYJ – Scott Dierking 1-yard run (Pat Leahy kick). Jets 17–14.

Top passers

- NYJ – Richard Todd – 15/24, 277 yards, TD, 2 INT
- RAI – Jim Plunkett – 21/33, 266 yards, TD, 3 INT

Top rushers

- NYJ – Freeman McNeil – 23 rushes, 101 yards
- RAI – Marcus Allen – 15 rushes, 36 yards, TD

Top receivers

- NYJ – Wesley Walker – 7 receptions, 169 yards, TD
- RAI – Malcolm Barnwell – 2 receptions, 83 yards, TD

Scott Dierking scored the Jets' winning touchdown with 3:45 left to upset the top-seeded Raiders. New York linebacker Lance Mehl subsequently intercepted two passes from Jim Plunkett in the final minutes to seal the victory. Jets running back Freeman McNeil rushed for 105 yards and caught a pass for 11. Wesley Walker caught seven passes for 169 yards and a touchdown. On defense, New York held Raiders running back Marcus Allen, the NFL's 4th leading rusher, to just 36 yards on 15 carries.

Walker's 20-yard touchdown catch and Pat Leahy's 30-yard field goal gave New York a 10–0 lead before Los Angeles stormed back, taking a 14–10 lead on Allen's 3-yard touchdown run and a 57-yard scoring reception by Malcolm Barnwell. Late in the fourth quarter, New York drove 67 yards in six plays, including Richard Todd's 45-yard completion to Walker on the Raiders 1-yard line, where Dierking took the ball into the end zone to give the Jets a 17–14 lead. Their defense seemed to put the game away when Mehl intercepted a pass from Plunkett with slightly over two minutes left on the Raiders ensuing drive. However, Los Angeles defensive end Lyle Alzado forced a fumble from McNeil that linebacker Ted Hendricks recovered to give his team one last chance to drive for a tying score. The Jets defense proved up to the challenge, and Mehl intercepted another Plunkett pass that enabled New York to run out the rest of the clock.

Hendricks finished the game with a sack and two fumble recoveries.

This was the second postseason meeting between the Jets and Raiders. New York won the only prior meeting when the Raiders were based in Oakland and prior to the AFL–NFL merger.

Previous playoff games
New York leads 1–0 in all-time playoff games

1968

Oakland Raiders 23 @ New York Jets 27

1968 AFL Championship Game

=== Sunday, January 16, 1983 ===
==== AFC: Miami Dolphins 34, San Diego Chargers 13 ====
San Diego Chargers vs. Miami Dolphins – Game summary

| Quarter | 1 | 2 | 3 | 4 | Total |
|---|---|---|---|---|---|
| Chargers | 0 | 13 | 0 | 0 | 13 |
| Dolphins | 7 | 20 | 0 | 7 | 34 |

at Orange Bowl, Miami, Florida, U.S.

- Game time: 12:30 p.m. EST
- Game weather: 64 °F (18 °C), mostly cloudy
- Game attendance: 71,383
- Referee: Jerry Markbreit
- TV announcers (NBC): Don Criqui (play-by-play), John Brodie, and Bob Griese (color commentators)
- Box score

Game information

First quarter

- MIA – Nat Moore 3-yard pass from David Woodley (Uwe von Schamann kick). Dolphins 7–0.

Second quarter

- MIA – Andra Franklin 3-yard run (Uwe von Schamann kick). Dolphins 14–0.
- MIA – Ronnie Lee 6-yard pass from David Woodley (Uwe von Schamann kick). Dolphins 21–0.
- MIA – Uwe von Schamann 24-yard field goal. Dolphins 24–0.
- SD – Charlie Joiner 28-yard pass from Dan Fouts (kick failed). Dolphins 24–6.
- MIA – Uwe von Schamann 23-yard field goal. Dolphins 27–6.
- SD – Chuck Muncie 1-yard run (Rolf Benirschke kick). Dolphins 27–13.

Third quarter

- No scoring plays.

Fourth quarter

- MIA – David Woodley 7-yard run (Uwe von Schamann kick). Dolphins 34–13.

Top passers

- SD – Dan Fouts – 15/34, 191 yards, TD, 5 INT
- MIA – David Woodley – 17/22, 195 yards, 2 TD, INT

Top rushers

- SD – Chuck Muncie – 11 rushes, 62 yards, TD
- MIA – Andra Franklin – 23 rushes, 96 yards, TD

Top receivers

- SD – Chuck Muncie] – 6 receptions, 53 yards
- MIA – Jimmy Cefalo – 2 receptions, 69 yards

Miami avenged their divisional playoff loss to San Diego in the previous season known as the Epic in Miami with a dominating 34–13 win, racking up 413 yards while holding the Chargers to a season low 247. The Dolphins defense completely shut down Chargers quarterback Dan Fouts, limiting him to just 15 of 34 completions for 194 yards and a touchdown while intercepting him five times. The Dolphins led 27–13 at halftime. Miami quarterback David Woodley, who was benched in the second quarter of the Epic in Miami due to poor performance, redeemed himself by completing 17 of 22 passes for 195 yards, two touchdowns, and an interception, while also scoring a rushing touchdown. The Dolphins converted three first half turnovers, including consecutive fumbled kickoffs, into 17 points.

Gerald Small intercepted Fouts on the game's opening possession and returned the ball 16 yards to San Diego 26-yard line, setting up Woodley's 3-yard touchdown pass to Nat Moore at the end of a five-play drive. Following a punt, Miami increased their lead to 14–0 with Andra Franklin's 3-yard touchdown run at the end of an 89-yard drive. Then kicker Uwe von Schamann recovered a fumble from Hank Bauer on the ensuing kickoff, giving the Dolphins the ball on the Chargers 23, and they scored another touchdown with Woodley's 6-yard pass to tight end Ronnie Lee. On the next kickoff, returner James Brooks lost a fumble that was recovered by Dolphins running back Rich Diana on the San Diego 37, leading to von Schamann's 24-yard field goal that put the Dolphins up 24–0 with 7:45 left in the first half.

A few minutes later, the Chargers finally caught a break when a short Miami punt and facemask penalty during the return gave them the ball at the Dolphins 28, where Fouts threw a touchdown pass to Charlie Joiner. But the team's miscues continued as Rolf Benirschke missed the extra point. Then on Miami's ensuing drive, Jimmy Cefalo's 53-yard reception led to von Schamann's 23-yard field goal. Still, the Chargers managed to cut the deficit to 27–13 before halftime with a 76-yard drive, 40 yards coming from Dolphins penalties. Chuck Muncie finished the drive with a 1-yard touchdown run with 22 seconds left in the second quarter.

Miami lost turnovers on each of their first two drives of the second half: Bruce Laird's interception of a Woodley pass and a fumble by Tony Nathan that was recovered by Chargers linebacker Woodrow Lowe on the San Diego 7-yard line. However, the Chargers could not convert either of them into points, and after moving the ball 47 yards to the Dolphins 36 following the Nathan fumble, Fouts was intercepted by Dolphins safety Glenn Blackwood. Miami converted this turnover into their final score, a 7-yard run by Woodley. Meanwhile, the next three Chargers drives all ended in interceptions; a second pick by Glenn Blackwood, the next by his older brother Lyle Blackwood, and the last by cornerback Don McNeal.

This was the final postseason game in the Hall of Fame careers of Chargers stars Dan Fouts, Charlie Joiner, and Kellen Winslow. Joiner's touchdown was his only reception of the game, while Winslow had one for 18. Receiver Wes Chandler, who led the NFL in receiving yards during the season, finished this game with two receptions for 38 yards. Muncie rushed for 62 yards and a touchdown, while also catching six passes for 53. Franklin was the Dolphins top rusher with 96 yards and a touchdown. Nathan rushed for 83 yards and caught eight passes for 55.

This was the second postseason meeting between the Chargers and Dolphins. San Diego won the only previous meeting one season ago.

Previous playoff games
San Diego leads 1–0 in all-time playoff games

1981

San Diego Chargers 41 @ Miami Dolphins 38 (OT)

1981 AFC Divisional playoffs

==== NFC: Dallas Cowboys 37, Green Bay Packers 26 ====
Green Bay Packers vs. Dallas Cowboys – Game summary

| Quarter | 1 | 2 | 3 | 4 | Total |
|---|---|---|---|---|---|
| Packers | 0 | 7 | 6 | 13 | 26 |
| Cowboys | 6 | 14 | 3 | 14 | 37 |

at Texas Stadium, Irving, Texas

- Game time: 4:00 p.m. EST/3:00 p.m. CST
- Game weather: 54 °F (12 °C), sunny
- Game attendance: 63,972
- Referee: Gene Barth
- TV announcers (CBS): Pat Summerall (play-by-play) and John Madden (color commentator)

Game information

First quarter

- DAL – Rafael Septién 50-yard field goal. Cowboys 3–0.
- DAL – Rafael Septién 34-yard field goal. Cowboys 6–0.

Second quarter

- GB – James Lofton 6-yard pass from Lynn Dickey (Jan Stenerud kick). Packers 7–6.
- DAL – Timmy Newsome 2-yard run (Rafael Septién kick). Cowboys 13–7.
- DAL – Dennis Thurman 39-yard interception return (Rafael Septién kick). Cowboys 20–7.

Third quarter

- GB – Jan Stenerud 30-yard field goal. Cowboys 20–10.
- GB – Jan Stenerud 33-yard field goal. Cowboys 20–13.
- DAL – Rafael Septién 24-yard field goal. Cowboys 23–13.

Fourth quarter

- GB – James Lofton 71-yard run (kick failed). Cowboys 23–19.
- DAL – Doug Cosbie 7-yard pass from Danny White (Rafael Septién kick). Cowboys 30–19.
- GB – Mark Lee 22-yard interception return (Jan Stenerud kick). Cowboys 30–26.
- DAL – Timmy Newsome 1-yard run (Rafael Septién kick). Cowboys 37–26.

Top passers

- GB – Lynn Dickey – 19/36, 332 yards, TD, 3 INT
- DAL – Danny White – 23/36, 225 yards, TD, 2 INT

Top rushers

- GB – James Lofton – 1 rush, 71 yards, TD
- DAL – Tony Dorsett – 27 rushes, 99 yards

Top receivers

- GB – James Lofton – 5 receptions, 109 yards, TD
- DAL – Tony Hill – 7 receptions, 142 yards

The Cowboys scored touchdowns on two 80-yard drives while cornerback Dennis Thurman had three interceptions, including a 39-yard touchdown and one to clinch the victory. Packers quarterback Lynn Dickey threw for a franchise postseason record 332 yards and a touchdown, but his three interceptions were too costly to overcome. Receiver James Lofton caught five passes for 109 yards and a touchdown, and also had a 71-yard touchdown run on a reverse play, which tied the record for longest running play in a playoff game at the time.

Dallas kicker Rafael Septién gave the team a 3–0 lead with a 50-yard field goal on the opening drive of the game. Then Green Bay returner Del Rodgers fumbled the kickoff, which linebacker Jeff Rohrer recovered for the Cowboys, leading to another Septién field goal, this one from 34 yards. By this point, the Cowboys had a 6–0 lead and had run 19 consecutive plays to start the game. Green Bay would not get a first down until 11:31 remained in the second quarter. Still, they managed to take a 7–6 lead with a 74-yard drive to score on Dickey's 6-yard pass to Lofton. Dallas struck back with an 80-yard drive to score on a 2-yard touchdown run by Robert Newhouse. Then with 1:13 left in the half, Thurman's 39-yard interception return gave the Cowboys a 20–7 lead by halftime.

In the second half, the Packers mounted a strong comeback attempt, racking up 363 yards and scoring 19 points. Midway through the fourth quarter, Green Bay defensive back Mark Lee's 22-yard interception return for a touchdown cut the Packers deficit to 30–26. But later on, Thurman's third interception set up a 74-yard scoring drive, including a trick play where receiver Drew Pearson took a lateral from Danny White and then threw a 49-yard completion to Tony Hill on the Green Bay 1-yard line. On the next play, Newhouse' second touchdown run put the game away.

Green Bay finished the game with a franchise playoff record 466 total yards. The Packers would not play another postseason game until 1993.

This would be the final playoff win in Cowboys' coach Tom Landry's career. It would be the Cowboys last playoff victory until 1991. Hill finished the game with 7 receptions for 142 yards.

This was the third postseason meeting between the Packers and Cowboys. Green Bay won both previous meetings.

Previous playoff games
Green Bay leads 2–0 in all-time playoff games

1966

Green Bay Packers 34 @ Dallas Cowboys 27

1966 NFL Championship Game

1967

Dallas Cowboys 17 @ Green Bay Packers 21

1967 NFL Championship Game

== Conference championships ==
=== Saturday, January 22, 1983 ===
==== NFC: Washington Redskins 31, Dallas Cowboys 17 ====
Dallas Cowboys vs. Washington Redskins – Game summary

| Quarter | 1 | 2 | 3 | 4 | Total |
|---|---|---|---|---|---|
| Cowboys | 3 | 0 | 14 | 0 | 17 |
| Redskins | 7 | 7 | 7 | 10 | 31 |

at Robert F. Kennedy Memorial Stadium, Washington, D.C.

- Game time: 12:30 p.m. EST
- Game weather: 38 °F (3 °C), overcast
- Game attendance: 55,045
- Referee: Jerry Seeman
- TV announcers (CBS): Pat Summerall (play-by-play) and John Madden (color commentator)

Game information

First quarter

- DAL – Rafael Septién 27-yard field goal. Cowboys 3–0.
- WAS – Charlie Brown 19-yard pass from Joe Theismann (Mark Moseley kick). Redskins 7–3.

Second quarter

- WAS – John Riggins 1-yard run (Mark Moseley kick). Redskins 14–3.

Third quarter

- DAL – Drew Pearson 6-yard pass from Gary Hogeboom (Rafael Septién kick). Redskins 14–10.
- WAS – John Riggins 4-yard run (Mark Moseley kick). Redskins 21–10.
- DAL – Butch Johnson 23-yard pass from Gary Hogeboom (Rafael Septién kick). Redskins 21–17.

Fourth quarter

- WAS – Mark Moseley 29-yard field goal. Redskins 24–17.
- WAS – Darryl Grant 10-yard interception return (Mark Moseley kick). Redskins 31–17.

Top passers

- DAL – Gary Hogeboom – 14/29, 162 yards, 2 TD, 2 INT
- WAS – Joe Theismann – 12/20, 150 yards, TD

Top rushers

- DAL – Tony Dorsett – 15 rushes, 57 yards
- WAS – John Riggins – 36 rushes, 140 yards, 2 TD

Top receivers

- DAL – Butch Johnson – 5 receptions, 73 yards, TD
- WAS – Charlie Brown – 3 receptions, 54 yards, TD

The significance of this NFC Championship Game is that it was the first, and to date, the only time that any Conference Championship game was played on a Saturday, instead of the usual Sunday. As a result of that unusual scheduling, Dallas played on short rest. In their regular-season meeting, Dallas had handed Washington their only loss of the year, 24–10, holding running back John Riggins to just 26 rushing yards while sacking quarterback Joe Theismann seven times and intercepting three of his passes. But this game would turn out quite different as the Redskins sealed the victory by converting two turnovers in the final quarter into 10 points. Although Dallas outgained Washington in total yards 340–260, it wasn't enough to overcome their three turnovers versus none for the Redskins.

The Cowboys scored first after a 75-yard drive led to a 27-yard field goal by kicker Rafael Septién. But Washington then scored on a 9-play, 84-yard possession to take the lead. Riggins rushed for 32 yards on the drive, while Theismann capped it off with a 19-yard touchdown pass to wide receiver Charlie Brown. In the second quarter, a pair of completions by Theismann and 24 more yards from Riggins moved the Redskins into scoring range, only to have kicker Mark Moseley miss a 27-yard field goal.

Later on, the Cowboys committed a special teams blunder of their own when rookie kick returner Rod Hill muffed a Jeff Hayes punt and linebacker Monte Coleman recovered it, giving Washington the ball on the Dallas 10-yard line. Four plays later, Riggins scored a 1-yard touchdown run, increasing his team's lead to 14–3.

With 23 seconds left in the first half, Cowboys quarterback Danny White suffered a concussion after being hit by Washington's Dexter Manley and was replaced by unknown backup Gary Hogeboom, a three-year veteran who had only thrown eight passes in his career up to that point, for the rest of the game. A short Redskins punt early in the third quarter then set up Hogeboom's 6-yard touchdown toss to Drew Pearson, capping a six-play, 38-yard drive and cutting the score to 14–10. But on the ensuing kickoff, Mike Nelms returned the ball 76 yards down the right sideline to the Dallas 21-yard line. A 22-yard pass from Theismann to Brown was then followed by Riggins' four-yard touchdown run. Hogeboom then responded by leading Dallas on an 84-yard, 14-play drive capped by his 23-yard scoring pass to Butch Johnson, cutting the margin back to 21–17 with 3:25 left in the third quarter.

Dallas threatened to cut the lead further, driving to the Washington 23-yard line early in the fourth quarter, but Septién missed a 42-yard field goal, ending his NFL playoff record streak of consecutive field goal makes at 15. Following a Washington punt, Dallas had the ball at their own 32-yard line, but linebacker Mel Kaufman made a leaping, over-the-shoulder interception that was intended for Cowboys receiver Tony Hill, setting up Moseley's 29-yard field goal that gave the team a 24–17 lead with 6:55 left in regulation. The Cowboys were given the opportunity to drive for the tying touchdown, but then, from the Dallas 20-yard line, Manley tipped Hogeboom's delayed screen pass intended for running back Tony Dorsett, which Redskins defensive tackle Darryl Grant caught and returned 10 yards for the game-clinching touchdown.

White completed 9 of 15 passes for 113 yards before being knocked out of the game, while Hogeboom completed 14 of 29 passes for 162 yards, two touchdowns, and two interceptions in the only playoff game he would play in during his 10-season career. Theismann completed 12 of 20 passes for 150 yards and a touchdown. Nelms returned four kickoffs for 142 yards and two punts for 14.

Riggins, who ran nine straight times to help Washington run out the clock in the final quarter, finished the game with 140 rushing yards and two touchdowns, setting an NFL record with three consecutive 100-yard postseason games. "I've waited a long time for this," he said after the game. "I'm really thrilled. To tell you the truth, after the strike, I wasn't sure if I wanted to continue the season. I was ready to pack my bags and head for Kansas. Boy, what a mistake that would have been."

After appearing in 10 of the previous 13 NFC Championship games, this would be Dallas' last appearance until 1992.

This was the second postseason meeting between the Cowboys and Redskins. Washington won the only prior meeting.

Previous playoff games
Washington leads 1–0 in all-time playoff games

1972

Dallas Cowboys 3 @ Washington Redskins 26

1972 NFC Championship Game

=== Sunday, January 23, 1983 ===
==== AFC: Miami Dolphins 14, New York Jets 0 ====
New York Jets vs. Miami Dolphins – Game summary

| Quarter | 1 | 2 | 3 | 4 | Total |
|---|---|---|---|---|---|
| Jets | 0 | 0 | 0 | 0 | 0 |
| Dolphins | 0 | 0 | 7 | 7 | 14 |

at Orange Bowl, Miami, Florida, U.S.

- Game time: 12:30 p.m. EST
- Game weather: 67 °F (19 °C), rain
- Game attendance: 67,396
- Referee: Pat Haggerty
- TV announcers (NBC): Dick Enberg (play-by-play) and Merlin Olsen (color commentator)

Game information

First quarter

- No scoring plays.

Second quarter

- No scoring plays.

Third quarter

- MIA – Woody Bennett 7-yard run (Uwe von Schamann kick). Dolphins 7–0.

Fourth quarter

- MIA – A.J. Duhe 35-yard interception return (Uwe von Schamann kick). Dolphins 14–0.

Top passers

- NYJ – Richard Todd – 15/37, 103 yards, 5 INT
- MIA – David Woodley – 9/21, 87 yards, 3 INT

Top rushers

- NYJ – Freeman McNeil – 17 rushes, 46 yards
- MIA – David Woodley – 8 rushes, 46 yards

Top receivers

- NYJ – Lam Jones – 3 receptions, 35 yards
- MIA – Tommy Vigorito – 3 receptions, 29 yards

On a wet, muddy field (the Jets complained about the Dolphins' decision not to place the tarp over the field before the game), the Dolphins defense held Jets quarterback Richard Todd to only 15 completions in 37 attempts for 103 yards; he threw five interceptions. Linebacker A. J. Duhe led Miami to a victory with three interceptions, scoring a 35-yard touchdown and setting up the other Dolphins score. Miami held the Jets to 139 total yards.

Both teams started off with drives that would set the tone for the rest of the game. New York got the ball first and drove to midfield before losing it when Glenn Blackwood intercepted Todd's pass. On the first play after the turnover, Miami gave the ball right back with a pass that was picked off by Jets safety Ken Schroy. In the second quarter, Dolphins quarterback David Woodley broke free for a 17-yard run to his 39-yard line, which turned out to be the longest run of the day for either team. However, running back Tony Nathan lost a fumble on the next play, though the Jets still failed to get any points with a possession starting at the Miami 41.

Late in the second quarter, it seemed Miami would finally break the scoreless tie when their cornerback Don McNeal blocked a punt from Chuck Ramsey, allowing the Dolphins to get the ball on the New York 20-yard line. But with time running out, Schroy intercepted his second pass of the day and the game remained scoreless at halftime.

Early in the third quarter, Blackwood recorded his second interception, only to see it wiped out by a defensive holding penalty. But the next play fared no better for New York, as Todd threw a pass that bounced out of the hands of running back Mike Augustyniak and was intercepted by Duhe. A few plays later, Nathan appeared to lose a fumble, but officials ruled him down by contact before he lost the ball. Another key play on the drive occurred when Woodley completed a 13-yard pass to Duriel Harris on third down and 3. Safety Darrol Ray vehemently protested the call of a completed pass, drawing an unsportsmanlike conduct penalty that moved the ball to the Jets 7-yard line, and running back Woody Bennett ran the ball into the end zone on the next play.

Later in the third quarter, Duhe intercepted another pass from Todd, this one on the Jets 41-yard line, but his team couldn't move the ball and had to punt. Two minutes into the fourth quarter, Duhe recorded his third interception of the day, and this time took it 35 yards for a touchdown. The Dolphins 14–0 lead turned out to be more than enough, as New York never mounted a serious scoring threat for the rest of the game.

Both teams combined for nine turnovers, 19 punts, and just 437 total yards.

This would be the last time the Dolphins would shut out the Jets until week 5 of the 2020 season when the Dolphins shut out the Jets 24–0.

This was the first postseason meeting between the Jets and Dolphins.

== Super Bowl XVII: Washington Redskins 27, Miami Dolphins 17 ==
Super Bowl XVII – Miami Dolphins vs. Washington Redskins – Game summary

| Quarter | 1 | 2 | 3 | 4 | Total |
|---|---|---|---|---|---|
| Dolphins (AFC) | 7 | 10 | 0 | 0 | 17 |
| Redskins (NFC) | 0 | 10 | 3 | 14 | 27 |

at Rose Bowl, Pasadena, California

- Date: January 30, 1983
- Game attendance: 103,667
- Referee: Jerry Markbreit
- TV announcers (NBC): Dick Enberg (play-by-play) and Merlin Olsen (color commentator)

This was the second Super Bowl meeting between the Dolphins and Redskins. Miami won the only prior meeting.

Previous playoff games
Miami leads 1–0 in all-time playoff games

1972

Miami Dolphins 14 vs. Washington Redskins 7

Super Bowl VII
