= George Crump (American football) =

American football player (born 1959)

No. 91
- Position: Defensive end

Personal information
- Born: July 22, 1959 (age 67); Portsmouth, Virginia, U.S.
- Listed height: 6 ft 4 in (1.93 m)
- Listed weight: 260 lb (118 kg)

Career information
- High school: Chesapeake (VA) Indian River
- College: East Carolina
- NFL draft: 1982: 4th round, 85th overall pick

Career history
- New England Patriots (1982)

Career NFL statistics
- Sacks: 1
- Safeties: 1
- Stats at Pro Football Reference

George Stanley Crump (born July 22, 1959) is an American former professional football player who was a defensive end for the New England Patriots of the National Football League (NFL) in 1982. He played college football for the East Carolina Pirates before being selected by the Patriots in the fourth round of the 1982 NFL draft with the 85th overall pick. In Week 12 of the 1982 season, he recorded a safety against the Houston Oilers when tackling Archie Manning.
