= Ricky Smith (American football) =

American football player (born 1960)

No. 27, 26, 41
- Position: Cornerback

Personal information
- Born: July 20, 1960 (age 66); Quincy, Florida, U.S.
- Listed height: 6 ft 0 in (1.83 m)
- Listed weight: 182 lb (83 kg)

Career information
- High school: Shanks (Quincy)
- College: Alabama State
- NFL draft: 1982: 6th round, 141st overall pick

Career history
- New England Patriots (1982–1984); Washington Redskins (1984); Indianapolis Colts (1985)*; Miami Dolphins (1986)*; Detroit Lions (1987)
- * Offseason or practice squad member only

Career NFL statistics
- Interceptions: 2
- Fumble recoveries: 8
- Touchdowns: 2
- Stats at Pro Football Reference

Ricky DeCarlo Smith (born July 20, 1960) is an American former professional football player who was a cornerback in the National Football League (NFL) for the New England Patriots, Washington Redskins, and Detroit Lions. He played college football for the Alabama State Hornets and was selected in the sixth round of the 1982 NFL draft with the 141st overall pick.

Smith was also a long jumper for the Alabama State Hornets track and field team. He finished 4th in the long jump at the 1979 NAIA men's outdoor track and field championship.
