= Brian Ingram =

American football player (born 1959)

No. 51, 52
- Position: Linebacker

Personal information
- Born: October 31, 1959 (age 67); Memphis, Tennessee, U.S.
- Listed height: 6 ft 4 in (1.93 m)
- Listed weight: 236 lb (107 kg)

Career information
- High school: Hamilton (Memphis)
- College: Tennessee
- NFL draft: 1982: 4th round, 111th overall pick

Career history
- New England Patriots (1982–1985); San Diego Chargers (1987)
- Stats at Pro Football Reference

Brian DeWayne Ingram (born October 31, 1959) is an American former professional football linebacker. He played for the New England Patriots from 1982 to 1986 and the San Diego Chargers in 1987. He was selected by the Patriots in the fourth round of the 1982 NFL draft with the 111th overall pick.
