= Guy Ruff =

American football player (born 1960)

No. 36, 56
- Position: Linebacker

Personal information
- Born: August 18, 1960 (age 66); Ravenna, Ohio, U.S.
- Listed height: 6 ft 1 in (1.85 m)
- Listed weight: 215 lb (98 kg)

Career information
- High school: Windham (Windham, Ohio)
- College: Syracuse (1978–1981)
- NFL draft: 1982: undrafted

Career history
- Pittsburgh Steelers (1982); New Jersey Generals (1984)*; Chicago Blitz (1984); New Jersey Generals (1985)*; Ottawa Rough Riders (1985)*
- * Offseason or practice squad member only
- Stats at Pro Football Reference

Guy Moroney Ruff (born August 18, 1960) is an American former professional football linebacker who played for the Pittsburgh Steelers of the National Football League (NFL). He played college football for the Syracuse Orange. During the 1982 NFL season, he scored what was believed to be the quickest touchdown to ever open an NFL postseason game, occurring only 12 seconds into the game.

== Early life ==
Guy Moroney Ruff was born on August 18, 1960, in Ravenna, Ohio. He participated in high school football and track at Windham High School in Windham, Ohio. As a senior in 1977, he rushed 121 times for 703 yards on offense while recording four sacks, two blocked kicks, and one fumble recovery as a linebacker on defense. He earned All-Portage County honors at running back for his performance during the 1977 season.

== College career ==
In February 1978, Ruff signed a national letter of intent to play college football for the Orange of Syracuse University. He was listed as a defensive end/linebacker during his freshman season of 1978. In September 1979, Ruff was first-team on the Thousand Oaks Star's 1979 college football all-name team. He became a starting linebacker during the middle of the 1979 season due to injuries. Ruff was on the roster in 1980 but did not earn a letter. Overall, he was a varsity letterman in 1978, 1979, and 1981. He was a starting linebacker for a portion of his 1981 senior season. He played in all 11 games in 1981, despite having a bruised shoulder at one point, posting 20 solo tackles, 28 assisted tackles, and one interception. His 48 tackles were the ninth-best on the team that year.

== Professional career ==
After going undrafted in the 1982 NFL draft, Ruff signed with the Pittsburgh Steelers on May 5. He was noted for his speed, reportedly once running the 100-yard dash in 9.9 seconds. After pulling his hamstring in the preseason finale, he was placed on injured reserve on September 6 before the start of the 1982 regular season. On December 24, 1982, he was activated off of injured reserve, taking the roster spot of Sidney Thornton. Ruff played in the final two regular season games for the Steelers. He also appeared in the Steelers' playoff loss against the San Diego Chargers on January 9, 1983, and recovered the opening kickoff in the end zone for a touchdown after it was fumbled by San Diego's James Brooks. The Pittsburgh Post-Gazette reported that it was believed to be the quickest touchdown to ever open an NFL postseason game, occurring only 12 seconds into the game. The Post-Gazette noted that the Elias Sports Bureau could only find a 16-second touchdown that opened a playoff game from the 1981 season. Ruff was slowed by a knee injury during the 1983 preseason and was released by the Steelers on August 15, 1983, after the third preseason game.

Ruff later signed with the New Jersey Generals of the United States Football League (USFL) for the 1984 USFL season. However, he was released on February 20, 1984, before the start of the season. He was then signed by the USFL's Chicago Blitz. In early June, Ruff was listed on the Blitz's injury report with a knee injury. It is not clear if he played in any games for the Blitz. He later signed with the Generals again for the 1985 USFL season, but was released again on January 28, 1985, before the start of the season.

On April 18, 1985, Ruff signed with the Ottawa Rough Riders of the Canadian Football League (CFL). He was released on June 17 before the start of the 1985 CFL season.

== Personal life ==
Ruff worked in manufacturing after his football career. As of 2023, he was a vice president in the Hanes division of Leggett & Platt. Ruff and his wife adopted a son.
