= John Goodson =

American football player (born 1960)

No. 17
- Position: Punter

Personal information
- Born: March 18, 1960 (age 66); Houston, Texas, U.S.
- Listed height: 6 ft 3 in (1.91 m)
- Listed weight: 204 lb (93 kg)

Career information
- High school: Spring Woods (Houston)
- College: Texas
- NFL draft: 1982: 8th round, 209th overall pick

Career history
- Pittsburgh Steelers (1982); Houston Oilers (1984)*
- * Offseason or practice squad member only

Career NFL statistics
- Punts: 49
- Punt yards: 1,981
- Longest punt: 66
- Stats at Pro Football Reference

John Warren Goodson (born March 18, 1960) is an American former professional football player who was a punter for one season with the Pittsburgh Steelers of the National Football League (NFL). He played college football for the Texas Longhorns.
