= 1984 Seattle Seahawks season =

American football team season

- Owner: The Nordstrom family
- General manager: Mike McCormack
- Head coach: Chuck Knox
- Offensive coordinator: Ray Prochaska
- Defensive coordinator: Tom Catlin
- Home stadium: Kingdome

Results
- Record: 12–4
- Division place: 2nd AFC West
- Playoffs: Won Wild Card Playoffs (vs. Raiders) 13–7; Lost Divisional Playoffs (at Dolphins) 10–31
- All-Pros: WR Steve Largent (2nd team); NT Joe Nash (1st team); CB Dave Brown (2nd team); DE Jacob Green (2nd team); SS Kenny Easley (1st team); K Norm Johnson (1st team); ST Fredd Young (1st team)
- Pro Bowlers: QB Dave Krieg; WR Steve Largent; CB Dave Brown; ST Fredd Young; NT Joe Nash; SS Kenny Easley; K Norm Johnson

The 1984 Seattle Seahawks season was the team's ninth season with the National Football League (NFL). The season opener was moved from Sunday to Monday afternoon on Labor Day to avoid a conflict with a Seattle Mariners baseball game.

The 1984 Seahawks were a well-balanced team on offense and defense. The 1984 Seahawks season was the Seahawks' best season as a team in the AFC West. They scored 418 points (26.1 per game), and gave up only 282 points (17.6 per game), both ranked 5th in the NFL. Their point differential of +136 points was third in the NFL; the Seahawks' giveaway/takeaway ratio was +24, best in the league. The team's 63 defensive takeaways is the most in NFL history for a 16-game schedule, and the most since the merger.

The team's offense boasted a 3,000-yard passer in quarterback Dave Krieg (3,671 yards), and a 1,000-yard wide receiver in Steve Largent (74 receptions for 1,164 yards). The passing attack more than made up for the loss of star running back Curt Warner, who suffered a season-ending knee injury in the opener.

The Seahawks's defensive line generated an outstanding pass rush, with defensive ends Jeff Bryant and Jacob Green registering 14.5 and 13 sacks, respectively. Safety Kenny Easley led the team and league with 10 interceptions. Easley, Green, and NT Joe Nash made the All-Pro team.

In a wild week-10 game against the Kansas City Chiefs, the Seahawks intercepted Kansas City's quarterbacks six times, and returned four of them for touchdowns. All the touchdown returns were for over 50 yards. In the game, the Seahawks set NFL records for most yards returning interceptions (325), and most interceptions-for-touchdowns in a game (4).

Seattle would make the playoffs for the second straight season. They defeated the defending Super Bowl champion Los Angeles Raiders 13–7 in the wild card round avenging their 1983 loss. However, they were not able to advance past the Miami Dolphins, as they lost in Miami 31–10 to a powerful Dolphins squad led by record setting second year quarterback Dan Marino, who they had defeated in the playoffs the previous season. After this season, the Seahawks wouldn't win another playoff game until their Super Bowl-appearing 2005 season.

== 1984 NFL draft ==
1984 Seattle Seahawks draft
Round	Selection	Player	Position	College
1	22	Terry Taylor	Defensive back	Southern Illinois
2	49	Daryl Turner	Wide receiver	Michigan State
3	76	Fredd Young	Linebacker	New Mexico State
4	86	Rickey Hagood	Nose tackle	South Carolina
6	162	John Kaiser	Linebacker	Arizona
7	189	Sam Slater	Offensive tackle	Weber State
8	216	John Puzar	Center	Long Beach State
9	243	Adam Schreiber	Center	Texas
10	270	Randall Morris	Running back	Tennessee
11	302	Steve Gemza	Offensive Tackle	UCLA
12	329	Theo Windham	Defensive Back	Utah State
Supp.		Gordon Houston	Tight end	Brigham Young
Supp.		Alvin Powell	Offensive Guard	Winston-Salem State
Supp.		Frank Seurer	Quarterback	Kansas

== Personnel ==
=== Staff ===
1984 Seattle Seahawks staff
**Front office**: President/general manager – Mike McCormack; Assistant general manager – Chuck Allen; Player personnel director – Mike Allman; Assistant player personnel director – Rick Thompson; Pro personnel assistant – Randy Mueller; Head athletic trainer - Jim Whitesel; Assistant athletic trainer - John Kasik; **Head coaches**: Head coach – Chuck Knox; Assistant head coach – Tom Catlin; **Offensive coaches**: Offensive coordinator/offensive line – Ray Prochaska; Quarterbacks – Ken Meyer; Offensive backs – Chick Harris; Receivers – Steve Moore; Tight ends – Rusty Tillman	**Defensive coaches**: Defensive coordinator/linebackers – Tom Catlin; Defensive line – George Dyer; Defensive backs – Ralph Hawkins; Special assignments – Joe Vitt; **Special teams coaches**: Special teams – Rusty Tillman

=== Final roster ===
1984 Seattle Seahawks roster
**Quarterbacks (QB)**: **17** Dave Krieg; 10 Jim Zorn; **Running backs (RB)**: 32 Cullen Bryant; 31 Zachary Dixon; 33 Dan Doornink; 46 David Hughes; **37** Eric Lane; 43 Randall Morris; **Wide receivers (WR)**: 83 Chris Castor; **80** Steve Largent; 82 Paul Skansi; **81** Daryl Turner; 89 Byron Walker; **Tight ends (TE)**: 88 Pete Metzelaars; **86** Mike Tice; **87** Charle Young	**Offensive linemen (OL)**: 69 Sid Abramowitz T; 65 Edwin Bailey G; **59** Blair Bush C; **78** Bob Cryder T; **64** Ron Essink T; 62 Kani Kauahi C; **67** Reggie McKenzie G; **61** Robert Pratt G; 75 Adam Schreiber G; **Defensive linemen (DL)**: **77** Jeff Bryant DE; 68 Randy Edwards DE; 74 Mike Fanning DE; **79** Jacob Green DE; 73 Dino Mangiero NT; **72** Joe Nash NT	**Linebackers (LB)**: **53** Keith Butler ILB; **56** Greg Gaines OLB; 55 Michael Jackson OLB; 60 John Kaiser ILB; 51 Sam Merriman ILB; 57 Shelton Robinson ILB; **58** Bruce Scholtz OLB; **50** Fredd Young OLB; **Defensive backs (DB)**: **22** Dave Brown CB; 35 Don Dufek FS; **45** Kenny Easley SS; **44** John Harris FS; 24 Terry Jackson CB; 21 Paul Moyer SS; **42** Keith Simpson CB; 20 Terry Taylor CB; **Special teams (ST)**: 9 Norm Johnson K; 8 Jeff West P	**Reserve**: 96 Chuck Butler LB (IR); 63 Marcus Hicks LB (IR); 85 Paul Johns WR (IR); 71 Bryan Millard T (IR); 52 Joe Norman LB (PUP); 84 Dwight Scales WR (IR); 28 Curt Warner RB (IR); 54 Eugene Williams LB (PUP); Rookies in italics 49 active, 8 reserve

- Starters in bold.
- (*) Denotes players that were selected for the 1985 Pro Bowl.

== Schedule ==
=== Preseason ===
Week	Date	Opponent	Result	Record	Venue	Recap
HOF	July 28	at Tampa Bay Buccaneers	**W** 38–0	1–0	Fawcett Stadium (Canton)	Recap
1	August 4	Buffalo Bills	**W** 7–3	2–0	Kingdome	Recap
2	August 11	at Detroit Lions	**W** 28–24	3–0	Pontiac Silverdome	Recap
3	August 17	St. Louis Cardinals	**W** 17–7	4–0	Kingdome	Recap
5	August 24	at San Francisco 49ers	**L** 7–17	4–1	Candlestick Park	Recap

Source: Seahawks Media Guides

=== Regular season ===
Divisional matchups have the AFC West playing the NFC Central.

Week	Date	Opponent	Result	Record	Venue	Recap
1	September 3	Cleveland Browns	**W** 33–0	1–0	Kingdome	Recap
2	September 9	**San Diego Chargers**	**W** 31–17	2–0	Kingdome	Recap
3	September 16	at New England Patriots	**L** 23–38	2–1	Sullivan Stadium	Recap
4	September 23	Chicago Bears	**W** 38–9	3–1	Kingdome	Recap
5	September 30	at Minnesota Vikings	**W** 20–12	4–1	Hubert H. Humphrey Metrodome	Recap
6	October 7	at **Los Angeles Raiders**	**L** 14–28	4–2	Los Angeles Memorial Coliseum	Recap
7	October 14	Buffalo Bills	**W** 31–28	5–2	Kingdome	Recap
8	October 21	at Green Bay Packers	**W** 30–24	6–2	Milwaukee County Stadium	Recap
9	October 29	at **San Diego Chargers**	**W** 24–0	7–2	Jack Murphy Stadium	Recap
10	November 4	**Kansas City Chiefs**	**W** 45–0	8–2	Kingdome	Recap
11	November 12	**Los Angeles Raiders**	**W** 17–14	9–2	Kingdome	Recap
12	November 18	at Cincinnati Bengals	**W** 26–6	10–2	Riverfront Stadium	Recap
13	November 25	at **Denver Broncos**	**W** 27–24	11–2	Mile High Stadium	Recap
14	December 2	Detroit Lions	**W** 38–17	12–2	Kingdome	Recap
15	December 9	at **Kansas City Chiefs**	**L** 7–34	12–3	Arrowhead Stadium	Recap
16	December 15	**Denver Broncos**	**L** 14–31	12–4	Kingdome	Recap
Note: Intra-division opponents are in **bold** text.

Source: 1984 NFL season results

=== Postseason ===
Round	Date	Opponent (seed)	Result	Record	Venue	Recap
Wild Card	December 22	Los Angeles Raiders (5)	**W** 13–7	1–0	Kingdome	Recap
Divisional	December 29	at Miami Dolphins (1)	**L** 10–31	1–1	Miami Orange Bowl	Recap

== Standings ==
AFC West
	W	L	T	PCT	DIV	CONF	PF	PA	STK
^{(2)} Denver Broncos	13	3	0	.813	6–2	10–2	353	241	W2
^{(4)} Seattle Seahawks	12	4	0	.750	5–3	8–4	418	282	L2
^{(5)} Los Angeles Raiders	11	5	0	.688	5–3	8–4	368	278	L1
Kansas City Chiefs	8	8	0	.500	4–4	7–7	314	324	W3
San Diego Chargers	7	9	0	.438	0–8	3–9	394	413	L2

== Game summaries ==
=== Preseason ===
==== Week P1: at Tampa Bay Buccaneers ====
Preseason Week One: Seattle Seahawks at Tampa Bay Buccaneers – Game summary

Quarter	1	2	3	4	Total
Seahawks	7	21	3	7	38
Buccaneers	0	0	0	0	0

at Fawcett Stadium, Canton, Ohio

- Date: July 28
- Game time: 3:00 pm local
- Game weather: clear, 74 °F (23 °C), 52% humidity, wind E 8 miles per hour (13 km/h)
- Game attendance: 22,250
- Referee: Pat Haggerty
- TV announcers (ABC): Bill Flemming and O. J. Simpson
- Gamebook

==== Week P2: vs. Buffalo Bills ====
Preseason Week Two: Seattle Seahawks vs. Buffalo Bills – Game summary

Quarter	1	2	3	4	Total
Bills	0	0	3	0	3
Seahawks	0	7	0	0	7

at Kingdome, Seattle

- Date: August 4
- Game time: 7:33 pm local
- Game weather: indoors
- Game attendance: 53,360
- Referee: Fred Silva
- Gamebook

==== Week P3: at Detroit Lions ====
Preseason Week Three: Seattle Seahawks at Detroit Lions – Game summary

Quarter	1	2	3	4	Total
Seahawks	14	7	0	7	28
Lions	7	10	0	7	24

at Silverdome, Pontiac, Michigan

- Date: August 11
- Game time: 7:05 pm local
- Game weather: indoors
- Game attendance: 41,414
- Referee: Jerry Seeman
- TV announcers (KING): Charlie Jones and Gene Washington
- Gamebook

==== Week P4: vs. St. Louis Cardinals ====
Preseason Week Four: Seattle Seahawks vs. St. Louis Cardinals – Game summary

Quarter	1	2	3	4	Total
Cardinals	7	0	0	0	7
Seahawks	0	7	10	0	17

at Kingdome, Seattle

- Date: August 17
- Game time: 7:36 pm local
- Game weather: indoors
- Game attendance: 53,772
- Referee: Red Cashion
- Gamebook

==== Week P5: at San Francisco 49ers ====
Preseason Week Five: Seattle Seahawks at San Francisco 49ers – Game summary

Quarter	1	2	3	4	Total
Seahawks	0	0	0	7	7
49ers	7	7	3	0	17

at Candlestick Park, San Francisco

- Date: August 24
- Game time: 6:07 pm local
- Game weather: clear, 68 °F (20 °C), wind N 5 miles per hour (8.0 km/h)
- Game attendance: 49,219
- Referee: Jerry Seeman
- TV: KING
- Gamebook

=== Regular season ===
==== Week 1: vs. Cleveland Browns ====
Week One: Seattle Seahawks vs. Cleveland Browns – Game summary

Quarter	1	2	3	4	Total
Browns	0	0	0	0	0
Seahawks	7	13	13	0	33

at Kingdome, Seattle

- Date: September 3
- Game time: 1:07 pm local
- Game weather: indoors
- Game attendance: 59,540
- Referee: Jerry Markbreit
- TV announcers (KING-TV): Charlie Jones and Gene Washington (game only aired in Seattle TV market)
- Gamebook

Game information

First quarter

- SEA – Mike Tice 5-yard pass from Dave Krieg (Norm Johnson kick), 7:48 (SEA 7–0)

Second quarter

- SEA – Norm Johnson 22-yard field goal, 6:25 (SEA 10–0)
- SEA – Paul Johns 35-yard pass from Dave Krieg (Norm Johnson kick), 3:13 (SEA 17–0)
- SEA – Norm Johnson 50-yard field goal, 0:24 (SEA 20–0)

Third quarter

- SEA – Norm Johnson 41-yard field goal, 6:12 (SEA 23–0)
- SEA – Norm Johnson 24-yard field goal, 5:35 (SEA 26–0)

Fourth quarter

- SEA – Daryl Turner 35-yard pass from Dave Krieg (Norm Johnson kick), 2:19 (SEA 33–0)

Top passers

- CLE – Paul McDonald: 8/27, 114 yds, 2 INT
- SEA – Dave Krieg: 14/28, 179 yds, 3 TD, 1 INT

Top rushers

- CLE – Mike Pruitt: 15 car, 43 yds
- SEA – Curt Warner: 10 car, 40 yds

Top receivers

- CLE – Duriel Harris: 2 rec, 45 yds
- SEA – Paul Johns: 3 rec, 49 yds, 1 TD

Team – pass – rush – total – to

- CLE – 68 – 52 – 120 – 5
- SEA – 162 – 145 – 307 – 3

==== Week 2: vs. San Diego Chargers ====
Week Two: Seattle Seahawks vs. San Diego Chargers – Game summary

Quarter	1	2	3	4	Total
Chargers	10	0	0	7	17
Seahawks	0	10	7	14	31

at Kingdome, Seattle

- Date: September 9
- Game time: 1:00 pm local
- Game weather: indoors
- Game attendance: 61,314
- Referee: Pat Haggerty
- TV announcers (NBC): Charlie Jones and Merlin Olsen
- Gamebook

Game information

First quarter

- SD – Rolf Benirschke 43-yard field goal, 10:56 (SD 3–0)
- SD – Bobby Duckworth 61-yard pass from Dan Fouts (Rolf Benirschke kick), 4:30 (SD 10–0)

Second quarter

- SEA – Eric Lane 1-yard run (Norm Johnson kick), 11:34 (SD 10–7)
- SEA – Norm Johnson 41-yard field goal, 0:01 (Tied 10–10)

Third quarter

- SEA – Dave Krieg 37-yard run (Norm Johnson kick), 8:17 (SEA 17–10)

Fourth quarter

- SEA – Dave Krieg 3-yard run (Norm Johnson kick), 14:10 (SEA 24–10)
- SEA – Daryl Turner 22-yard pass from Dave Krieg (Norm Johnson kick), 4:34 (SEA 31–10)
- SD – Eric Sievers 4-yard pass from Dan Fouts (Rolf Benirschke kick), 0:24 (SEA 31–17)

Top passers

- SD – Dan Fouts: 23/40 332 yds, 2 TD, 4 INT
- SEA – Dave Krieg: 18/38, 263 yds, 1 TD, 1 INT

Top rushers

- SD – Earnest Jackson: 16 car, 89 yds
- SEA – Dave Krieg: 6 car, 61 yds, 2 TD

Top receivers

- SD – Pete Holohan: 6 rec, 133 yds
- SEA – Daryl Turner: 3 rec, 97 yds, 1 TD

Team – pass – rush – total – to

- SD – 318 – 97 – 415 – 8
- SEA – 257 – 173 – 430 – 2

==== Week 3: at New England Patriots ====
Week Three: Seattle Seahawks at New England Patriots – Game summary

Quarter	1	2	3	4	Total
Seahawks	9	14	0	0	23
Patriots	0	7	14	17	38

at Schaefer Stadium, Foxborough, Massachusetts

- Date: September 16
- Game time: 1:00 pm local
- Game weather: clear, 58 °F (14 °C), 62% humidity, wind NNW 10 miles per hour (16 km/h)
- Game attendance: 43,140
- Referee: Bob McElwee
- TV announcers (NBC): Don Criqui and Bob Trumpy
- Gamebook

Game information

First quarter

- SEA – Norm Johnson 42-yard field goal, 8:17 (SEA 3–0)
- SEA – Daryl Turner 41-yard pass from Dave Krieg (PAT failed), 4:45 (SEA 9–0)

Second quarter

- SEA – Paul Johns 47-yard punt return (Norm Johnson kick), 10:16 (SEA 16–0)
- SEA – Kenny Easley 25-yard interception return (Norm Johnson kick), 9:16 (SEA 23–0)

Third quarter

- NE – Tony Eason 25-yard run (Tony Franklin kick), 0:35 (SEA 23–21)
- NE – Derrick Ramsey 2-yard pass from Tony Eason (Tony Franklin kick), 12:34 (SEA 23–14)
- NE – Mosi Tatupu 1-yard run (Tony Franklin kick), 4:34 (SEA 23–21)

Fourth quarter

- NE – Tony Franklin 32-yard field goal, 6:31 (NE 24–23)
- NE – Mosi Tatupu 10-yard run (Tony Franklin kick), 5:30 (NE 31–23)
- NE – Irving Fryar 15-yard pass from Tony Eason (Tony Franklin kick), 1:56 (NE 38–23)

Top passers

- SEA – Dave Krieg: 17/35, 265 yds, 1 TD, 2 INT
- NE – Tony Eason: 12/22, 126 yds, 2 TD

Top rushers

- SEA – David Hughes: 8 car, 18 yds
- NE – Tony Collins: 20 car, 107 yds

Top receivers

- SEA – Paul Johns: 8 rec, 105 yds
- NE – Stephen Starring: 4 rec, 46 yds

Team – pass – rush – total – to

- SEA – 215 – 37 – 252 – 3
- NE – 102 – 189 – 291 – 2

The Seahawks saw the Patriots erase a 23–0 deficit with 38 unanswered points led by new quarterback Tony Eason, who took over halfway through the game for Steve Grogan.

==== Week 4: vs. Chicago Bears ====
Week Four: Seattle Seahawks vs. Chicago Bears – Game summary

Quarter	1	2	3	4	Total
Bears	7	0	0	2	9
Seahawks	7	3	21	7	38

at Kingdome, Seattle

- Date: September 23
- Game time: 1:00 pm local
- Game weather: indoors
- Game attendance: 61,520
- Referee: Chuck Heberling
- TV announcers (CBS): Tim Ryan & Johnny Morris
- Gamebook

Game information

First quarter

- CHI – Matt Suhey 3-yard pass from Walter Payton (Bob Thomas kick), 11:14 (CHI 7–0)
- SEA – Keith Simpson 39-yard interception return (Norm Johnson kick), 7:49 (Tied 7–7)

Second quarter

- SEA – Norm Johnson 27-yard field goal, 13:16 (SEA 10–7)

Third quarter

- SEA – Dave Krieg 3-yard run (Norm Johnson kick), 10:37 (SEA 17–7)
- SEA – Eric Lane 55-yard pass from Dave Krieg (Norm Johnson kick), 4:45 (SEA 24–7)
- SEA – Joe Nash recovered fumble in end zone (Norm Johnson kick), 3:46 (SEA 31–7)

Fourth quarter

- CHI – Safety, Seattle holding in end zone, 11:23 (SEA 31–9)
- SEA – Terry Jackson 62-yard interception return (Norm Johnson kick), 0:11 (SEA 38–9)

Top passers

- CHI – Bob Avellini: 13/26, 119 yds, 1 INT
- SEA – Dave Krieg: 6/16, 146 yds, 1 TD

Top rushers

- CHI – Walter Payton: 24 car, 116 yds
- SEA – Eric Lane: 17 car, 50 yds

Top receivers

- CHI – Willie Gault: 6 rec, 73 yds
- SEA – Eric Lane: 1 rec, 55 yds, 1 TD

Team – pass – rush – total – to

- CHI – 165 – 136 – 301 – 6
- SEA – 110 – 93 – 203 – 1

==== Week 5: at Minnesota Vikings ====
Week Five: Seattle Seahawks at Minnesota Vikings – Game summary

Quarter	1	2	3	4	Total
Seahawks	7	3	0	10	20
Vikings	3	3	3	3	12

at Metrodome, Minneapolis, Minnesota

- Date: September 30
- Game time: 12:00 pm local
- Game weather: indoors
- Game attendance: 57,171
- Referee: Gene Barth
- TV announcers (NBC): Todd Donoho and Gene Washington
- Gamebook

Game information

First quarter

- MIN – Jan Stenerud 43-yard field goal, 10:18 (MIN 3–0)
- SEA – Steve Largent 20-yard pass from Dave Krieg (Norm Johnson kick), 6:37 (SEA 7–3)

Second quarter

- MIN – Jan Stenerud 44-yard field goal, 1:01 (SEA 7–6)
- SEA – Norm Johnson 41-yard field goal, 0:03 (SEA 10–6)

Third quarter

- MIN – Jan Stenerud 28-yard field goal, 8:12 (SEA 10–9)

Fourth quarter

- SEA – Norm Johnson 31-yard field goal, 14:57 (SEA 13–9)
- MIN – Jan Stenerud 34-yard field goal, 3:59 (SEA 13–12)
- SEA – Eric Lane 40-yard run (Norm Johnson kick), 1:08 (SEA 20–12)

Top passers

- SEA – Dave Krieg: 17/27, 222 yds, 1 TD, 3 INT
- MIN – Tommy Kramer: 16/31, 227 yds, 1 INT

Top rushers

- SEA – Eric Lane: 14 car, 113 yds, 1 TD
- MIN – Alfred Anderson: 21 car, 69 yds

Top receivers

- SEA – Steve Largent: 8 rec, 130 yds, 1 TD
- MIN – Leo Lewis: 4 rec, 75 yds

Team – pass – rush – total – to

- SEA – 217 – 192 – 409 – 4
- MIN – 196 – 138 – 334 – 4

==== Week 6: at Los Angeles Raiders ====
Week Six: Seattle Seahawks at Los Angeles Raiders – Game summary

Quarter	1	2	3	4	Total
Seahawks	0	7	0	7	14
Raiders	0	14	0	14	28

at Los Angeles Memorial Coliseum, Los Angeles

- Date: October 7
- Game time: 1:00 pm local
- Game weather: hazy, 80 °F (27 °C), 69% humidity, wind SW 12 miles per hour (19 km/h)
- Game attendance: 77,904
- Referee: Ben Dreith
- TV announcers (NBC): Dick Enberg and Merlin Olsen
- Gamebook

Game information

First quarter

- No scoring plays

Second quarter

- LA – Marcus Allen 1-yard run (Chris Bahr kick), 10:31 (LA 7–0)
- LA – Todd Christensen 24-yard pass from Marc Wilson (Chris Bahr kick), 7:56 (LA 14–0)
- SEA – Steve Largent 27-yard pass from Dave Krieg (Norm Johnson kick), 2:38 (LA 14–7)

Third quarter

- No scoring plays

Fourth quarter

- SEA – David Hughes 2-yard run (Norm Johnson kick), 13:57 (Tied 14–14)
- LA – Marcus Allen 58-yard pass from Marc Wilson (Chris Bahr kick), 5:32 (LA 21–14)
- LA – Rod Martin 14-yard interception return (Chris Bahr kick), 5:13 (LA 28–14)

Top passers

- SEA – Dave Krieg: 5/12, 74 yds, 1 TD, 1 INT
- LA – Marc Wilson: 12/19, 309 yds, 2 TD

Top rushers

- SEA – Randall Morris: 15 car, 87 yds
- LA – Marcus Allen: 15 car, 40 yds, 1 TD

Top receivers

- SEA – Steve Largent: 4 rec, 66 yds, 1 TD
- LA – Marcus Allen: 4 rec, 173 yds, 1 TD

Team – pass – rush – total – to

- SEA – 61 – 131 – 192 – 3
- LA – 296 – 79 – 375 – 2

==== Week 7: vs. Buffalo Bills ====
Week Seven: Seattle Seahawks vs. Buffalo Bills – Game summary

Quarter	1	2	3	4	Total
Bills	0	14	7	7	28
Seahawks	17	0	7	7	31

at Kingdome, Seattle

- Date: October 14
- Game time: 1:03 pm local
- Game weather: indoors
- Game attendance: 59,034
- Referee: Fred Wyant
- TV: KING-TV (game aired only in the Seattle TV market, as NBC was airing Game 5 of the 1984 World Series)
- Gamebook

Game information

First quarter

- SEA – Daryl Turner 4-yard pass from Dave Krieg (Norm Johnson kick), 4:06 (SEA 7–0)
- SEA – Steve Largent 10-yard pass from Dave Krieg (Norm Johnson kick), 2:00 (SEA 14–0)
- SEA – Norm Johnson 25-yard field goal, 0:00 (SEA 17–0)

Second quarter

- BUF – Lucius Sanford 46-yard fumble return (Joe Danelo kick), 2:49 (SEA 17–7)
- BUF – Don Wilson 65-yard punt return (Joe Danelo kick), 1:27 (SEA 17–14)

Third quarter

- SEA – Eric Lane 1-yard run (Norm Johnson kick), 11:42 (SEA 24–14)
- BUF – Byron Franklin 50-yard pass from Joe Ferguson (Joe Danelo kick), 6:10 (SEA 24–21)

Fourth quarter

- BUF – Preston Dennard 38-yard pass from Joe Ferguson (Joe Danelo kick), 11:10 (BUF 28–24)
- SEA – Steve Largent 51-yard pass from Dave Krieg (Norm Johnson kick), 8:07 (SEA 31–28)

Top passers

- BUF – Joe Ferguson: 15/32, 227 yds, 2 TD, 2 INT
- SEA – Dave Krieg: 17/29, 231 yds, 3 TD, 2 INT

Top rushers

- BUF – Greg Bell: 28 car, 113 yds
- SEA – Eric Lane: 6 car, 21 yds, 1 TD

Top receivers

- BUF – Byron Franklin: 3 rec, 73 yds, 1 TD
- SEA – Steve Largent: 5 rec, 106 yds, 2 TD

Team – pass – rush – total – to

- BUF – 214 – 142 – 356 – 4
- SEA – 197 – 41 – 238 – 3

==== Week 8: at Green Bay Packers ====
Week Eight: Seattle Seahawks at Green Bay Packers – Game summary

Quarter	1	2	3	4	Total
Seahawks	7	13	7	3	30
Packers	17	0	7	0	24

at Milwaukee County Stadium, Milwaukee, Wisconsin

- Date: October 21
- Game time: 12:00 pm local
- Game weather: cloudy, 46 °F (8 °C), 86% humidity, wind N 12 miles per hour (19 km/h)
- Game attendance: 52,286
- Referee: Bob Frederic
- TV announcers (NBC): Don Criqui & Bob Trumpy
- Gamebook

Game information

First quarter

- GB – James Lofton 79-yard pass from Lynn Dickey (Al Del Greco kick), 14:41 (GB 7–0)
- SEA – Steve Largent 31-yard pass from Dave Krieg (Norm Johnson kick), 11:24 (Tied 7–7)
- GB – James Lofton 20-yard pass from Lynn Dickey (Al Del Greco kick), 7:26 (GB 14–7)
- GB – Al Del Greco 42-yard field goal, 0:56 (GB 17–7)

Second quarter

- SEA – Norm Johnson 29-yard field goal, 12:14 (GB 17–10)
- SEA – Norm Johnson 39-yard field goal, 1:11 (GB 17–13)
- SEA – Eric Lane 1-yard run (Norm Johnson kick), 0:09 (SEA 20–17)

Third quarter

- SEA – Daryl Turner 25-yard pass from Dave Krieg (Norm Johnson kick), 9:13 (SEA 27–17)
- GB – Gerry Ellis 8-yard pass from Lynn Dickey (Al Del Greco kick), 1:10 (SEA 27–24)

Fourth quarter

- SEA – Norm Johnson 45-yard field goal, 8:36 (SEA 30–24)

Top passers

- SEA – Dave Krieg: 22/35, 310 yds, 2 TD, 2 INT
- GB – Lynn Dickey: 24/38, 364 yds, 3 TD, 3 INT

Top rushers

- SEA – Eric Lane: 9 car, 32 yds, 1 TD
- GB – Jessie Clark: 11 car, 69 yds

Top receivers

- SEA – Steve Largent: 7 rec, 129 yds, 1 TD
- GB – James Lofton: 5 rec, 162 yds, 2 TD

Team – pass – rush – total – to

- SEA – 281 – 97 – 378 – 2
- GB – 312 – 92 – 404 – 3

==== Week 9: at San Diego Chargers ====
Week Nine: Seattle Seahawks at San Diego Chargers – Game summary

Quarter	1	2	3	4	Total
Seahawks	7	10	7	0	24
Chargers	0	0	0	0	0

at San Diego Stadium, San Diego, California

- Date: October 29
- Game time: 6:01 pm local
- Game weather: cloudy, 60 °F (16 °C), 84% humidity, wind 12 miles per hour (19 km/h)
- Game attendance: 53,974
- Referee: Dick Jorgensen
- TV announcers (ABC): Frank Gifford, Don Meredith, and O. J. Simpson
- Gamebook

Game information

First quarter

- SEA – Steve Largent 11-yard pass from Dave Krieg (Norm Johnson kick), 3:13 (SEA 7–0)

Second quarter

- SEA – Norm Johnson 42-yard field goal, 9:08 (SEA 10–0)
- SEA – Steve Largent 13-yard pass from Dave Krieg (Norm Johnson kick), 0:37 (SEA 17–0)

Third quarter

- SEA – Steve Largent 16-yard pass from Dave Krieg (Norm Johnson kick), 1:12 (SEA 24–0)

Fourth quarter

- No scoring plays

Top passers

- SEA – Dave Krieg: 23/29, 282 yds, 3 TD, 1 INT
- SD – Dan Fouts: 24/39, 200 yds, 2 INT

Top rushers

- SEA – David Hughes: 10 car, 36 yds
- SD – Earnest Jackson: 18 car, 38 yds

Top receivers

- SEA – Daryl Turner: 6 rec, 92 yds
- SD – Lionel James: 7 rec, 46 yds

Team – pass – rush – total – to

- SEA – 274 – 81 – 355 – 3
- SD – 153 – 48 – 201 – 4

==== Week 10: vs. Kansas City Chiefs ====
Week Ten: Seattle Seahawks vs. Kansas City Chiefs – Game summary

Quarter	1	2	3	4	Total
Chiefs	0	0	0	0	0
Seahawks	3	28	7	7	45

at Kingdome, Seattle

- Date: November 4
- Game time: 1:01 pm local
- Game weather: indoors
- Game attendance: 61,396
- Referee: Jerry Markbreit
- TV announcers (NBC): Jay Randolph and John Brodie
- Gamebook

Game information

First quarter

- SEA – Norm Johnson 29-yard field goal, 6:28 (SEA 3–0)

Second quarter

- SEA – Dave Brown 90-yard interception return (Norm Johnson kick), 13:29 (SEA 10–0)
- SEA – Keith Simpson 76-yard interception return (Norm Johnson kick), 11:18 (SEA 17–0)
- SEA – Dan Doornink 11-yard pass from Dave Krieg (Norm Johnson kick), 7:47 (SEA 24–0)
- SEA – Mike Tice 2-yard pass from Dave Krieg (Norm Johnson kick), 0:42 (SEA 31–0)

Third quarter

- SEA – Dave Brown 56-yard interception return (Norm Johnson kick), 12:40 (SEA 38–0)

Fourth quarter

- SEA – Kenny Easley 58-yard interception return (Norm Johnson kick), 1:35 (SEA 45–0)

Top passers

- KC – Bill Kenney: 8/18, 86 yds, 2 INT
- SEA – Dave Krieg: 12/20, 138 yds, 2 TD, 1 INT

Top rushers

- KC – Herman Heard: 13 car, 53 yds
- SEA – Zachary Dixon: 9 car, 54 yds

Top receivers

- KC – J.T. Smith: 5 rec, 49 yds
- SEA – Daryl Turner: 2 rec, 37 yds

Team – pass – rush – total – to

- KC – 196 – 78 – 274 – 6
- SEA – 129 – 132 – 261 – 1

==== Week 11: vs. Los Angeles Raiders ====
Week Eleven: Seattle Seahawks vs. Los Angeles Raiders – Game summary

Quarter	1	2	3	4	Total
Raiders	0	7	0	7	14
Seahawks	0	0	17	0	17

at Kingdome, Seattle

- Date: November 12
- Game time: 6:05 pm local
- Game weather: indoors
- Game attendance: 64,001
- Referee: Jim Tunney
- TV announcers (ABC): Frank Gifford, Don Meredith, and O. J. Simpson
- Gamebook

Game information

First quarter

- No scoring plays

Second quarter

- LA – Marcus Allen 1-yard run (Chris Bahr kick), 9:49 (LA 7–0)

Third quarter

- SEA – Norm Johnson 27-yard field goal, 12:21 (LA 7–3)
- SEA – Byron Walker 8-yard pass from Dave Krieg (Norm Johnson kick), 7:17 (SEA 10–7)
- SEA – Daryl Turner 20-yard pass from Dave Krieg (Norm Johnson kick), 4:02 (SEA 17–7)

Fourth quarter

- LA – Marcus Allen 1-yard run (Chris Bahr kick), 13:38 (SEA 17–14)

Top passers

- LA – Marc Wilson: 16/34, 191 yds, 3 INT
- SEA – Dave Krieg: 11/25, 156 yds, 2 TD, 1 INT

Top rushers

- LA – Frank Hawkins: 14 car, 65 yds
- SEA – Dan Doornink: 10 car, 41 yds

Top receivers

- LA – Todd Christensen: 6 rec, 71 yds
- SEA – Daryl Turner: 3 rec, 67 yds, 1 TD

Team – pass – rush – total – to

- LA – 169 – 141 – 310 – 6
- SEA – 122 – 85 – 207 – 2

==== Week 12: at Cincinnati Bengals ====
Week Twelve: Seattle Seahawks at Cincinnati Bengals – Game summary

Quarter	1	2	3	4	Total
Seahawks	7	10	0	9	26
Bengals	0	3	3	0	6

at Riverfront Stadium, Cincinnati, Ohio

- Date: November 18
- Game time: 1:00 pm local
- Game weather: rain/snow 34 °F (1 °C), 71% humidity, wind NE 8 miles per hour (13 km/h)
- Game attendance: 50,280
- Referee: Gordon McCarter
- TV announcers (NBC): Don Criqui and Bob Trumpy
- Gamebook

Game information

First quarter

- SEA – Zachary Dixon 2-yard run (Norm Johnson kick), 1:38 (SEA 7–0)

Second quarter

- SEA – Steve Largent 12-yard pass from Dave Krieg (Norm Johnson kick), 9:27 (SEA 14–0)
- CIN – Jim Breech 30-yard field goal, 3:54 (SEA 14–3)
- SEA – Norm Johnson 25-yard field goal, 0:08 (SEA 17–3)

Third quarter

- CIN – Jim Breech 33-yard field goal, 0:38 (SEA 17–6)

Fourth quarter

- SEA – Safety, Jeff Bryant tackled Turk Schonert in end zone, 13:44 (SEA 19–6)
- SEA – Zachary Dixon 1-yard run (Norm Johnson kick), 9:49 (SEA 26–6)

Top passers

- SEA – Dave Krieg: 10/16, 108 yds, 1 TD, 1 INT
- CIN – Turk Schonert: 14/26, 141 yds, 1 INT

Top rushers

- SEA – Dan Doornink: 17 car, 67 yds
- CIN – Larry Kinnebrew: 22 car, 119 yds

Top receivers

- SEA – Steve Largent: 5 rec, 65 yds, 1 TD
- CIN – James Brooks: 5 rec, 50 yds

Team – pass – rush – total – to

- SEA −104 – 120 – 224 – 1
- CIN – 115 – 162 – 277 – 5

==== Week 13: at Denver Broncos ====
Week Thirteen: Seattle Seahawks at Denver Broncos – Game summary

Quarter	1	2	3	4	Total
Seahawks	7	3	7	10	27
Broncos	3	7	7	7	24

at Mile High Stadium, Denver, Colorado

- Date: November 25
- Game time: 1:00 pm local
- Game weather: cloudy, 47 °F (8 °C), 36% humidity, wind NE 5 miles per hour (8.0 km/h)
- Game attendance: 74,922
- Referee: Jerry Seeman
- TV announcers (NBC): Marv Albert & John Brodie
- Gamebook

Game information

First quarter

- SEA – Daryl Turner 80-yard pass from Dave Krieg (Norm Johnson kick), 14:45 (SEA 7–0)
- DEN – Rich Karlis 27-yard field goal, 7:53 (SEA 7–3)

Second quarter

- SEA – Norm Johnson 33-yard field goal, 14:42 (SEA 10–3)
- DEN – Butch Johnson 19-yard pass from John Elway (Rich Karlis kick), 4:53 (Tied 10–10)

Third quarter

- SEA – David Hughes 6-yard run (Norm Johnson kick), 9:14 (SEA 17–10)
- DEN – Gene Lang 2-yard run (Rich Karlis kick), 7:16 (Tied 17–17)

Fourth quarter

- SEA – Steve Largent 3-yard pass from Dave Krieg (Norm Johnson kick), 12:25 (SEA 24–17)
- SEA – Norm Johnson 28-yard field goal, 6:32 (SEA 27–17)
- DEN – Gene Lang 9-yard pass from John Elway (Rich Karlis kick), 4:25 (SEA 27–24)

Top passers

- SEA – Dave Krieg: 30/44, 406 yds, 3 TD
- DEN – John Elway: 15/27, 275 yds, 2 TD, 1 INT

Top rushers

- SEA – Dan Doornink: 9 car, 32 yds
- DEN – John Elway: 5 car, 43 yds

Top receivers

- SEA – Steve Largent: 12 rec, 191 yds, 1 TD
- DEN – Gerald Willhite: 3 rec, 94 yds

Team – pass – rush – total – to

- SEA – 406 – 60 – 466 – 0
- DEN – 258 – 93 – 351 – 2

==== Week 14: vs. Detroit Lions ====
Week Fourteen: Seattle Seahawks vs. Detroit Lions – Game summary

Quarter	1	2	3	4	Total
Lions	3	14	0	0	17
Seahawks	7	14	0	17	38

at Kingdome, Seattle

- Date: December 2
- Game time: 1:02 pm local
- Game weather: indoors
- Game attendance: 62,441
- Referee: Red Cashion
- TV announcers (CBS): Jim Hill and John Dockery
- Gamebook

Game information

First quarter

- SEA – Steve Largent 3-yard pass from Dave Krieg (Norm Johnson kick), 10:44 (SEA 7–0)
- DET – Eddie Murray 45-yard field goal, 14:51 (SEA 7–3)

Second quarter

- DET – Ken Jenkins 25-yard run (Eddie Murray kick), 1:59 (DET 10–7)
- SEA – Steve Largent 13-yard pass from Dave Krieg (Norm Johnson kick), 5:24 (SEA 14–10)
- DET – James Jones 15-yard pass from Gary Danielson (Eddie Murray kick), 11:51 (DET 17–14)
- SEA – Daryl Turner 4-yard pass from Dave Krieg (Norm Johnson kick), 14:24 (SEA 21–17)

Third quarter

- No scoring plays

Fourth quarter

- SEA – Daryl Turner 51-yard pass from Dave Krieg (Norm Johnson kick), 1:43 (SEA 28–17)
- SEA – Norm Johnson 36-yard field goal, 5:06 (SEA 31–17)
- SEA – Mike Tice 5-yard pass from Dave Krieg (Norm Johnson kick), 8:03 (SEA 38–17)

Top passers

- DET – Gary Danielson: 11/20, 117 yds, 1 TD, 2 INT
- SEA – Dave Krieg: 27/38, 294 yds, 5 TD, 1 INT

Top rushers

- DET – Ken Jenkins: 12 car, 73 yds, 1 TD
- SEA – David Hughes: 7 car, 46 yds

Top receivers

- DET – James Jones: 6 rec, 42 yds, 1 TD
- SEA – Steve Largent: 8 rec, 104 yds, 2 TD

Team – pass – rush – total – to

- DET – 139 – 108 – 247 – 2
- SEA – 275 – 113 – 388 – 2

==== Week 15: at Kansas City Chiefs ====
Week Fifteen: Seattle Seahawks at Kansas City Chiefs – Game summary

Quarter	1	2	3	4	Total
Seahawks	7	0	0	0	7
Chiefs	7	17	7	3	34

at Arrowhead Stadium, Kansas City, Missouri

- Date: December 9
- Game time: 12:01 pm local
- Game weather: overcast, 54 °F (12 °C), 72% humidity, wind S 9 miles per hour (14 km/h)
- Game attendance: 34,855
- Referee: Pat Haggerty
- TV announcers (NBC): Charlie Jones and Bob Griese
- Gamebook

Game information

First quarter

- KC – Herman Heard 2-yard run (Nick Lowery kick), 8:26 (KC 7–0)
- SEA – Daryl Turner 49-yard pass from Dave Krieg (Norm Johnson kick), 0:54 (Tied 7–7)

Second quarter

- KC – Nick Lowery 29-yard field goal, 11:21 (KC 10–7)
- KC – Scott Radecic 19-yard interception return (Nick Lowery kick), 10:24 (KC 17–7)
- KC – Henry Marshall 26-yard pass from Bill Kenney (Nick Lowery kick), 5:22 (KC 24–7)

Third quarter

- KC – Carlos Carson 25-yard pass from Bill Kenney (Nick Lowery kick), 2:32 (KC 31–7)

Fourth quarter

- KC – Nick Lowery 22-yard field goal, 12:17 (KC 34–7)

Top passers

- SEA – Dave Krieg: 17/38, 263 yds, 1 TD, 5 INT
- KC – Bill Kenney: 18/37, 312 yds, 2 TD

Top rushers

- SEA – David Hughes: 8 car, 32 yds
- KC – Herman Heard: 24 car, 73 yds, 1 TD

Top receivers

- SEA – Steve Largent: 4 rec, 98 yds
- KC – Henry Marshall: 8 rec, 166 yds, 1 TD

Team – pass – rush – total – to

- SEA – 307 – 66 – 373 – 6
- KC – 325 – 91 – 416 – 0

==== Week 16: vs. Denver Broncos ====
Week Sixteen: Seattle Seahawks vs. Denver Broncos – Game summary

Quarter	1	2	3	4	Total
Broncos	10	0	14	7	31
Seahawks	0	7	7	0	14

at Kingdome, Seattle

- Date: December 15
- Game time: 1:02 pm local
- Game weather: indoors
- Game attendance: 64,411
- Referee: Gene Barth
- TV announcers (NBC): Dick Enberg & Merlin Olsen
- Gamebook

Game information

First quarter

- DEN – John Elway 1-yard run (Rich Karlis kick), 12:35 (DEN 7–0)
- DEN – Rich Karlis 34-yard field goal, 5:02 (DEN 10–0)

Second quarter

- SEA – Dan Doornink 4-yard pass from Dave Krieg (Norm Johnson kick), 10:28 (DEN 10–7)

Third quarter

- DEN – James Wright 14-yard pass from John Elway (Rich Karlis kick), 12:26 (DEN 17–7)
- DEN – Steve Foley 40-yard interception return (Rich Karlis kick), 4:25 (DEN 24–7)
- SEA – Charle Young 14-yard pass from Dave Krieg (Norm Johnson kick), 0:51 (DEN 24–14)

Fourth quarter

- DEN – Rick Parros 4-yard run (Rich Karlis kick), 14:14 (DEN 31–14)

Top passers

- DEN – John Elway: 9/21, 148 yds, 1 TD, 4 INT
- SEA – Dave Krieg: 30/50, 334 yds, 2 TD, 2 INT

Top rushers

- DEN – Sammy Winder: 18 car, 80 yds
- SEA – David Hughes: 8 car, 38 yds

Top receivers

- DEN – Steve Watson: 2 rec, 84 yds
- SEA – Steve Largent: 7 rec, 96 yds

Team – pass – rush – total – to

- DEN – 148 – 143 – 291 – 4
- SEA – 306 – 79 – 385 – 3

=== Postseason ===
Seattle entered the postseason as the #4 seed in the AFC.

==== AFC Wild Card Playoff: vs #5 Los Angeles Raiders ====
AFC Wild Card Playoff: #5 Los Angeles Raiders at #4 Seattle Seahawks – Game summary

Quarter	1	2	3	4	Total
Raiders	0	0	0	7	7
Seahawks	0	7	3	3	13

at Kingdome, Seattle

- Date: December 22
- Game time: 1:02 pm local
- Game weather: indoors
- Game attendance: 62,049
- Referee: Dick Jorgensen
- TV announcers (NBC): Charlie Jones and Bob Griese
- Gamebook

Game information

First quarter

- No scoring plays

Second quarter

- SEA – Daryl Turner 26-yard pass from Dave Krieg (Norm Johnson kick), 10:41 (SEA 7–0)

Third quarter

- SEA – Norm Johnson 35-yard field goal, 13:31 (SEA 10–0)

Fourth quarter

- SEA – Norm Johnson 44-yard field goal, 4:10 (SEA 13–0)
- LA – Marcus Allen 5-yard pass from Jim Plunkett (Chris Bahr kick), 9:55 (SEA 13–7)

Top passers

- LA – Jim Plunkett: 14/27, 184 yds, 1 TD, 2 INT
- SEA – Dave Krieg: 4/10, 70 yds, 1 TD

Top rushers

- LA – Marcus Allen: 17 car, 61 yds
- SEA – Dan Doornink: 29 car, 126 yds

Top receivers

- LA – Marcus Allen: 5 rec, 90 yds, 1 TD
- SEA – Daryl Turner: 1 rec, 26 yds, 1 TD

Team – pass – rush – total – to

- LA – 135 – 105 – 240 – 3
- SEA – 46 – 205 – 251 – 0

==== AFC Divisional Playoff: at #1 Miami Dolphins ====
AFC Divisional Playoff: #4 Seattle Seahawks at #1 Miami Dolphins – Game summary

Quarter	1	2	3	4	Total
Seahawks	0	10	0	0	10
Dolphins	7	7	14	3	31

at Miami Orange Bowl, Miami, Florida

- Date: December 29
- Game time: 1:00 pm local
- Game weather: clear, 77 °F (25 °C), 67% humidity, wind E 16 miles per hour (26 km/h)
- Game attendance: 73,469
- Referee: Pat Haggerty
- TV announcers (NBC): Marv Albert and John Brodie
- Gamebook

Game information

First quarter

- MIA – Tony Nathan 14-yard run (Uwe von Schamann kick), 4:09 (MIA 7–0)

Second quarter

- SEA – Norm Johnson 27-yard field goal, 13:36 (MIA 7–3)
- MIA – Jimmy Cefalo 56-yard pass from Dan Marino (Uwe von Schamann kick), 10:53 (MIA 14–3)
- SEA – Steve Largent 56-yard pass from Dave Krieg (Norm Johnson kick), 3:23 (MIA 14–10)

Third quarter

- MIA – Bruce Hardy 3-yard pass from Dan Marino (Uwe von Schamann kick), 4:25 (MIA 21–10)
- MIA – Mark Clayton 33-yard pass from Dan Marino (Uwe von Schamann kick), 2:25 (MIA 28–10)

Fourth quarter

- MIA – Uwe von Schamann 37-yard field goal, 11:28 (MIA 31–10)

Top passers

- SEA – Dave Krieg: 20/35, 234 yds, 1 TD
- MIA – Dan Marino: 21/34, 262 yds, 3 TD, 2 INT

Top rushers

- SEA – Dan Doornink: 10 car, 35 yds
- MIA – Tony Nathan: 18 car, 76 yds, 1 TD

Top receivers

- SEA – Steve Largent: 6 rec, 128 yds, 1 TD
- MIA – Mark Clayton: 5 rec, 75 yds, 1 TD

Team – pass – rush – total – to

- SEA – 216 – 51 – 267 – 1
- MIA – 262 – 143 – 405 – 2
