= 1985 Seattle Seahawks season =

American football team season

- Owner: The Nordstrom family
- General manager: Mike McCormack
- Head coach: Chuck Knox
- Offensive coordinator: Ray Prochaska
- Defensive coordinator: Tom Catlin
- Home stadium: Kingdome

Results
- Record: 8–8
- Division place: 3rd AFC West
- Playoffs: Did not qualify
- All-Pros: WR Steve Largent (1st team); SS Kenny Easley (1st team)
- Pro Bowlers: WR Steve Largent; LB Fredd Young; SS Kenny Easley

The 1985 Seattle Seahawks season was the team's tenth season with the National Football League (NFL). The team finished with an 8–8 record and a 3rd-place finish in the AFC West and missed the playoffs. The Seahawks 1985 season has the odd distinction of being the only team in NFL history to win two games, then lose two games, alternately, for the entire season.

== Offseason ==
=== Draft ===
1985 Seattle Seahawks draft
Round	Pick	Player	Position	College	Notes
2	53	Owen Gill	RB	Iowa	
3	81	Danny Greene	WR	Washington	
4	109	Tony Davis	TE	Missouri	
5	123	Mark Napolitan	C	Michigan St	
5	128	Arnold Brown	DB	NC Central	
5	137	Johnnie Jones	RB	Tennessee	
7	193	Ron Mattes	OT	Virginia	
8	221	Judious Lewis	WR	Arkansas St	
9	248	Bob Otto	DE	Idaho St	
10	277	John Conner	QB	Arizona	
10	280	James Bowers	DB	Memphis	
11	305	Louis Cooper	LB	Western Carolina	
Made roster † Pro Football Hall of Fame * Made at least one Pro Bowl during career

=== Undrafted free agents ===
1985 undrafted free agents of note
Player	Position	College
Beau Babka	Nose tackle	Hawaii
Anthony Beverley	Linebacker	SMU
Pete Blazek	Tackle	Georgia Tech
Julio Cortes	Linebacker	Miami (FL)
Anthony DiLuto	Nose tackle	Oregon State
Dale Dorning	Defensive end	Oregon
James Gargus	Punter	TCU
Tom Gerber	Defensive end	Arizona State
Gale Gilbert	Quarterback	California
Harry Grimminger	Guard	Nebraska
Greg Haeusler	Linebacker	SMU
Adam Haysbert	Wide Receiver	BYU
Ernest Hines	Tackle	Norfolk State
Darry Hopper	Cornerback	USC
Bob Hudetz	Linebacker	Oregon
Don La Bomme	Fullback	Washington State
Matt Latham	Safety	Connecticut
Eugene Robinson	Safety	Colgate
Mike Rusinek	Defensive end	California
Michael Scott	Wide receiver	Pacific
William Scott	Safety	Morris Brown
Lenson Staples	Linebacker	Missouri
John Tushar	Guard	Cincinnati
Carlton Walker	Guard	Utah
Leon Winfrey	Wide receiver	Morris Brown
Barry Wood	Kicker	Tulane
Tony Wood	Tackle	Connecticut
Tony Wrice	Cornerback	Northwestern (lowa)
Gino Wynter	Wide receiver	Vanderbilt

== Personnel ==
=== Staff ===
1985 Seattle Seahawks staff
**Front office**: President/general manager – Mike McCormack; Assistant general manager – Chuck Allen; Player personnel director – Mike Allman; Assistant player personnel director – Rick Thompson; Pro personnel assistant – Randy Mueller; Head athletic trainer - Jim Whitesel; Assistant athletic trainer - John Kasik; **Head coaches**: Head coach – Chuck Knox; Assistant head coach – Tom Catlin; **Offensive coaches**: Offensive coordinator – Ray Prochaska; Quarterbacks – Ken Meyer; Offensive backs – Chick Harris; Receivers – Steve Moore; Tight ends – Rusty Tillman; Offensive line – Kent Stephenson	**Defensive coaches**: Defensive coordinator/linebackers – Tom Catlin; Defensive line – George Dyer; Defensive backs – Ralph Hawkins; Special assignments – Joe Vitt; **Special teams coaches**: Special teams – Rusty Tillman

=== Final roster ===
1985 Seattle Seahawks roster
**Quarterbacks (QB)**: 7 Gale Gilbert; **17** Dave Krieg; **Running backs (RB)**: **46** David Hughes; 37 Eric Lane; 43 Randall Morris; 29 Rick Parros; **28** Curt Warner; **Wide receivers (WR)**: 83 Ray Butler; **80** Steve Largent *; 82 Paul Skansi; **81** Daryl Turner; 89 Byron Walker; **Tight ends (TE)**: 85 Dan Ross; 86 Mike Tice; **87** Charle Young	**Offensive linemen (OL)**: **65** Edwin Bailey G; 76 Jon Borchardt G; **59** Blair Bush C; **78** Bob Cryder T; 62 Kani Kauahi C; 71 Bryan Millard T/G; **61** Robert Pratt G; **Defensive linemen (DL)**: **77** Jeff Bryant DE; 68 Randy Edwards DE; **79** Jacob Green DE; 63 Reggie Kinlaw NT; **72** Joe Nash NT	**Linebackers (LB)**: **53** Keith Butler ILB; 56 Greg Gaines OLB; **55** Michael Jackson OLB; 54 John Kaiser OLB; 51 Sam Merriman ILB; 57 Shelton Robinson ILB; **58** Bruce Scholtz OLB; **50** Fredd Young ILB *; **Defensive backs (DB)**: **22** Dave Brown CB; **45** Kenny Easley SS *; **44** John Harris FS; 24 Terry Jackson CB; 21 Paul Moyer SS; 41 Eugene Robinson FS; 42 Keith Simpson CB; **20** Terry Taylor CB; **Special teams (ST)**: 15 Dave Finzer P; 9 Norm Johnson K	**Reserve**: 90 Tony Davis TE (IR); 94 Angelo Dilulo NT (IR); 31 Zachary Dixon RB (PUP); 33 Dan Doornink RB (IR); **64** Ron Essink T (IR); 88 Byron Franklin WR (IR); 84 Danny Greene WR (IR); 14 Jeff Komlo QB (IR); 70 Ron Mattes T (IR); 40 John Williams RB (IR); Rookies in italics

- Starters in bold.
- (*) Denotes players that were selected for the 1986 Pro Bowl.

== Schedule ==
=== Preseason ===
Week	Date	Opponent	Result	Record	Venue	Recap
1	August 10	at Indianapolis Colts	**L** 7–19	0–1	Hoosier Dome	Recap
2	August 16	Detroit Lions	**W** 28–3	1–1	Kingdome	Recap
3	August 24	at Minnesota Vikings	**W** 27–10	2–1	Hubert H. Humphrey Metrodome	Recap
4	August 30	San Francisco 49ers	**L** 21–23	2–2	Kingdome	Recap

Source: Seahawks Media Guides

=== Regular season ===
Divisional matchups have the AFC West playing the NFC West.

Week	Date	Opponent	Result	Record	Venue	Recap
1	September 8	at Cincinnati Bengals	**W** 28–24	1–0	Riverfront Stadium	Recap
2	September 15	at **San Diego Chargers**	**W** 49–35	2–0	Jack Murphy Stadium	Recap
3	September 23	Los Angeles Rams	**L** 24–35	2–1	Kingdome	Recap
4	September 29	at **Kansas City Chiefs**	**L** 7–28	2–2	Arrowhead Stadium	Recap
5	October 6	**San Diego Chargers**	**W** 26–21	3–2	Kingdome	Recap
6	October 13	Atlanta Falcons	**W** 30–26	4–2	Kingdome	Recap
7	October 20	at **Denver Broncos**	**L** 10–13 (OT)	4–3	Mile High Stadium	Recap
8	October 27	at New York Jets	**L** 14–17	4–4	Giants Stadium	Recap
9	November 3	**Los Angeles Raiders**	**W** 33–3	5–4	Kingdome	Recap
10	November 10	at New Orleans Saints	**W** 27–3	6–4	Louisiana Superdome	Recap
11	November 17	New England Patriots	**L** 13–20	6–5	Kingdome	Recap
12	November 25	at San Francisco 49ers	**L** 6–19	6–6	Candlestick Park	Recap
13	December 1	**Kansas City Chiefs**	**W** 24–6	7–6	Kingdome	Recap
14	December 8	Cleveland Browns	**W** 31–13	8–6	Kingdome	Recap
15	December 15	at **Los Angeles Raiders**	**L** 3–13	8–7	Los Angeles Memorial Coliseum	Recap
16	December 20	**Denver Broncos**	**L** 24–27	8–8	Kingdome	Recap
Note: Intra-division opponents are in **bold** text.

Source: 1985 NFL season results

== Standings ==
AFC West
	W	L	T	PCT	DIV	CONF	PF	PA	STK
^{(1)} Los Angeles Raiders	12	4	0	.750	5–3	9–3	354	308	W6
Denver Broncos	11	5	0	.688	5–3	8–4	380	329	W2
Seattle Seahawks	8	8	0	.500	4–4	6–6	349	303	L2
San Diego Chargers	8	8	0	.500	3–5	7–7	467	435	L1
Kansas City Chiefs	6	10	0	.375	3–5	4–8	317	360	W1

== Game summaries ==
=== Preseason ===
==== Week P1: at Indianapolis Colts ====
Preseason Week One: Seattle Seahawks at Indianapolis Colts – Game summary

Quarter	1	2	3	4	Total
Seahawks	7	0	0	0	7
Colts	0	3	3	13	19

at Hoosier Dome, Indianapolis

- Date: August 10
- Game time: 7:31 pm local
- Game weather: indoors
- Game attendance: 60,014
- Referee: Dick Jorgensen
- TV: KING
- Gamebook

==== Week P2: vs. Detroit Lions ====
Preseason Week Two: Seattle Seahawks vs. Detroit Lions – Game summary

Quarter	1	2	3	4	Total
Lions	0	3	0	0	3
Seahawks	0	0	7	21	28

at Kingdome, Seattle

- Date: August 16
- Game time: 7:34 pm local
- Game weather: indoors
- Game attendance: 57,751
- Referee: Bob Frederic
- Gamebook

==== Week P3: at Minnesota Vikings ====
Preseason Week Three: Seattle Seahawks at Minnesota Vikings – Game summary

Quarter	1	2	3	4	Total
Seahawks	14	3	7	2	26
Vikings	0	3	7	0	10

at Metrodome, Minneapolis

- Date: August 24
- Game time: 7:02 pm local
- Game weather: indoors
- Game attendance: 56,562
- Referee: Gene Barth
- TV: KING
- Gamebook

==== Week P4: vs. San Francisco 49ers ====
Preseason Week Four: Seattle Seahawks vs. San Francisco 49ers – Game summary

Quarter	1	2	3	4	Total
49ers	7	3	3	10	23
Seahawks	7	7	7	0	21

at Kingdome, Seattle

- Date: August 30
- Game time: 6:04 pm local
- Game weather: indoors
- Game attendance: 60,403
- Referee: Jerry Markbreit
- TV announcers (NBC): Dick Enberg & Merlin Olsen
- Gamebook

=== Regular season ===
==== Week 1: at Cincinnati Bengals ====
Week One: Seattle Seahawks at Cincinnati Bengals – Game summary

Quarter	1	2	3	4	Total
Seahawks	7	14	0	7	28
Bengals	0	10	14	0	24

at Riverfront Stadium, Cincinnati, Ohio

- Date: September 8
- Game time: 1:05 pm local
- Game weather: clear, 88 °F (31 °C), 71% humidity, wind W 8 miles per hour (13 km/h)
- Game attendance: 51,625
- Referee: Fred Silva
- TV announcers (NBC): Don Criqui & Bob Trumpy
- Gamebook

Game information

First quarter

- SEA – Byron Walker 28-yard pass from Dave Krieg (Norm Johnson kick), 10:12 (SEA 7–0)

Second quarter

- CIN – James Brooks 15-yard run (Jim Breech kick), 13:11 (Tied 7–7)
- SEA – Daryl Turner 6-yard pass from Dave Krieg (Norm Johnson kick), 10:04 (SEA 14–7)
- SEA – Charle Young 19-yard pass from Dave Krieg (Norm Johnson kick), 4:16 (SEA 21–7)
- CIN – Jim Breech 22-yard field goal, 2:26 (SEA 21–10)

Third quarter

- CIN – James Brooks 17-yard run (Jim Breech kick), 9:16 (SEA 21–17)
- CIN – Larry Kinnebrew 9-yard run (Jim Breech kick), 0:06 (CIN 24–21)

Fourth quarter

- SEA – Curt Warner 11-yard run (Norm Johnson kick), 7:07 (SEA 28–24)

Top passers

- SEA – Dave Krieg: 16/25, 236 yds, 3 TD, 1 INT
- CIN – Turk Schonert: 9/16, 169 yds, 1 TD

Top rushers

- SEA – Curt Warner: 17 car, 66 yds, 1 TD
- CIN – Larry Kinnebrew: 18 car, 101 yds, 1 TD

Top receivers

- SEA – Steve Largent: 5 rec, 81 yds
- CIN – Cris Collinsworth: 4 rec, 101 yds

Team – pass – rush – total – to

- SEA −206 – 91 – 297 – 0
- CIN – 193 – 151 – 344 – 1

==== Week 2: at San Diego Chargers ====
Week Two: Seattle Seahawks at San Diego Chargers – Game summary

Quarter	1	2	3	4	Total
Seahawks	7	7	28	7	49
Chargers	10	13	6	6	35

at Jack Murphy Stadium, San Diego

- Date: September 15
- Game time: 1:00 pm local
- Game weather: clear, 76 °F (24 °C), 73% humidity, wind SSW 14 miles per hour (23 km/h)
- Game attendance: 54,420
- Referee: Red Cashion
- TV announcers (NBC): Charlie Jones & Sam Rutigliano
- Gamebook

Game information

First quarter

- SD – Lionel James 7-yard pass from Dan Fouts (Bob Thomas kick), 7:18 (SD 7–0)
- SD – Bob Thomas 21-yard field goal, 3:53 (SD 10–0)
- SEA – Daryl Turner 34-yard pass from Dave Krieg (Norm Johnson kick), 0:37 (SD 10–7)

Second quarter

- SEA – Curt Warner 3-yard run (Norm Johnson kick), 14:10 (SEA 14–10)
- SD – Charlie Joiner 18-yard pass from Dan Fouts (PAT failed), 3:32 (SD 16–14)
- SD – Wes Chandler 20-yard pass from Dan Fouts (Bob Thomas kick), 0:43 (SD 23–14)

Third quarter

- SEA – Steve Largent 6-yard pass from Dave Krieg (Norm Johnson kick), 10:42 (SD 23–21)
- SD – Eric Sievers 5-yard pass from Dan Fouts (PAT failed), 8:47 (SD 29–21)
- SEA – Daryl Turner 15-yard pass from Dave Krieg (Norm Johnson kick), 6:38 (SD 29–28)
- SEA – Daryl Turner 30-yard pass from Dave Krieg (Norm Johnson kick), 2:22 (SEA 35–29)
- SEA – Curt Warner 1-yard run (Norm Johnson kick), 0:15 (SEA 42–29)

Fourth quarter

- SEA – Daryl Turner 7-yard pass from Dave Krieg (Norm Johnson kick), 12:10 (SEA 49–29)
- SD – Charlie Joiner 18-yard pass from Mark Herrmann (PAT failed), 0:11 (SEA 49–35)

Top passers

- SEA – Dave Krieg: 22/32, 307 yds, 5 TD
- SD – Dan Fouts: 29/43, 440 yds, 4 TD, 1 INT

Top rushers

- SEA – Curt Warner: 28 car, 169 yds, 2 TD
- SD – Lionel James: 8 car, 41 yds

Top receivers

- SEA – Daryl Turner: 7 rec, 121 yds, 4 TD
- SD – Wes Chandler: 13 rec, 243 yds, 1 TD

Team – pass – rush – total – to

- SEA – 293 – 196 – 489 – 0
- SD – 494 – 63 – 557 – 4

==== Week 3: vs. Los Angeles Rams ====
Week Three: Seattle Seahawks vs. Los Angeles Rams – Game summary

Quarter	1	2	3	4	Total
Rams	7	0	14	14	35
Seahawks	0	7	3	14	24

at Kingdome, Seattle

- Date: September 23
- Game time: 6:04 pm local
- Game weather: indoors
- Game attendance: 63,292
- Referee: Fred Wyant
- TV announcers (ABC): Frank Gifford, O. J. Simpson, and Joe Namath
- Gamebook

Game information

First quarter

- LA – Eric Dickerson 1-yard run (Mike Lansford kick), 2:32 (LA 7–0)

Second quarter

- SEA – Dave Brown 28-yard interception return (Norm Johnson kick), 7:27 (Tied 7–7)

Third quarter

- LA – Bobby Duckworth 19-yard pass from Dieter Brock (Mike Lansford kick), 13:14 (LA 14–7)
- LA – Eric Dickerson 2-yard run (Mike Lansford kick), 12:57 (LA 21–7)
- SEA – Norm Johnson 26-yard field goal, 3:55 (LA 21–10)

Fourth quarter

- SEA – Danny Greene 21-yard pass from Dave Krieg (Norm Johnson kick), 6:48 (LA 21–17)
- LA – Eric Dickerson 15-yard run (Mike Lansford kick), 3:33 (LA 28–17)
- LA – Danny Greene 21-yard interception return (Mike Lansford kick), 1:45 (LA 35–17)
- SEA – Daryl Turner 37-yard pass from Gale Gilbert (Norm Johnson kick), 0:28 (LA 35–24)

Top passers

- LA – Dieter Brock: 12/24, 203 yds, 1 TD, 3 INT
- SEA – Dave Krieg: 23/45, 267 yds, 1 TD, 2 INT

Top rushers

- LA – Eric Dickerson: 31 car, 150 yds, 3 TD
- SEA – Curt Warner: 13 car, 32 yds

Top receivers

- LA – Bobby Duckworth: 4 rec, 98 yds, 1 TD
- SEA – Daryl Turner: 3 rec, 90 yds, 1 TD

Team – pass – rush – total – to

- LA – 187 – 170 – 357 – 5
- SEA – 270 – 44 – 314 – 5

==== Week 4: at Kansas City Chiefs ====
Week Four: Seattle Seahawks at Kansas City Chiefs – Game summary

Quarter	1	2	3	4	Total
Seahawks	0	0	7	0	7
Chiefs	14	7	7	0	28

at Arrowhead Stadium, Kansas City, Missouri

- Date: September 29
- Game time: 12:00 pm local
- Game weather: showers, 47 °F (8 °C), 100% humidity, wind NE 6 miles per hour (9.7 km/h)
- Game attendance: 50,485
- Referee: Ben Dreith
- TV announcers (NBC): Charlie Jones and Sam Rutigliano
- Gamebook

Game information

First quarter

- KC – Herman Heard 2-yard run (Nick Lowery kick), 12:28 (KC 7–0)
- KC – Stephone Paige 34-yard pass from Bill Kenney (Nick Lowery kick), 5:28 (KC 14–0)

Second quarter

- KC – Bill Kenney 1-yard run (Nick Lowery kick), 0:26 (KC 21–0)

Third quarter

- KC – Stephone Paige 8-yard pass from Bill Kenney (Nick Lowery kick), 8:14 (KC 28–0)
- SEA – Daryl Turner 35-yard pass from Dave Krieg (Norm Johnson kick), 2:20 (KC 28–7)

Fourth quarter

- No scoring plays

Top passers

- SEA – Dave Krieg: 19/38, 220 yds, 1 TD, 4 INT
- KC – Bill Kenney: 8/19, 116 yds, 2 TD, 1 INT

Top rushers

- SEA – Curt Warner: 15 car, 56 yds
- KC – Herman Heard: 7 car, 26 yds

Top receivers

- SEA – Steve Largent: 6 rec, 92 yds
- KC – Stephone Paige: 3 rec, 66 yds, 2 TD

Team – pass – rush – total – to

- SEA – 301 – 68 – 369 – 7
- KC – 88 – 77 – 165 – 4

==== Week 5: vs. San Diego Chargers ====
Week Five: Seattle Seahawks vs. San Diego Chargers – Game summary

Quarter	1	2	3	4	Total
Chargers	0	7	0	14	21
Seahawks	3	3	7	13	26

at Kingdome, Seattle

- Date: October 6
- Game time: 1:02 pm local
- Game weather: indoors
- Game attendance: 61,300
- Referee: Bob Frederic
- TV announcers (NBC): Charlie Jones & Sam Rutigliano
- Gamebook

Game information

First quarter

- SEA – Norm Johnson 28-yard field goal, 10:01 (SEA 3–0)

Second quarter

- SEA – Norm Johnson 46-yard field goal, 11:41 (SEA 6–0)
- SD – Wes Chandler 3-yard pass from Mark Herrmann (Bob Thomas kick), 0:43 (SD 7–6)

Third quarter

- SEA – Curt Warner 1-yard run (Norm Johnson kick), 11:42 (SEA 13–7)

Fourth quarter

- SEA – Curt Warner 18-yard run (PAT failed), 10:55 (SEA 19–7)
- SD – Wes Chandler 6-yard pass from Mark Herrmann (Bob Thomas kick), 8:33 (SEA 19–14)
- SEA – Steve Largent 14-yard pass from Dave Krieg (Norm Johnson kick), 3:15 (SEA 26–14)
- SD – Charlie Joiner 9-yard pass from Mark Herrmann (Bob Thomas kick), 1:48 (SEA 26–21)

Top passers

- SD – Mark Herrmann: 26/35, 344 yds, 3 TD, 3 INT
- SEA – Dave Krieg: 16/26, 189 yds, 1 TD

Top rushers

- SD – Gary Anderson: 8 car, 15 yds
- SEA – Curt Warner: 28 car, 94 yds, 2 TD

Top receivers

- SD – Wes Chandler: 9 rec, 150 yds, 2 TD
- SEA – Steve Largent: 5 rec, 69 yds, 1 TD

Team – pass – rush – total – to

- SD – 305 – 40 – 345 – 5
- SEA – 145 – 108 – 253 – 1

==== Week 6: vs. Atlanta Falcons ====
Week Six: Seattle Seahawks vs. Atlanta Falcons – Game summary

Quarter	1	2	3	4	Total
Falcons	0	6	3	17	26
Seahawks	7	0	7	16	30

at Kingdome, Seattle

- Date: October 13
- Game time: 1:01 pm local
- Game weather: indoors
- Game attendance: 60,430
- Referee: Bob McElwee
- TV announcers (CBS): Dan Dierdorf and Jean Fugett
- Gamebook

Game information

First quarter

- SEA – Steve Largent 12-yard pass from Dave Krieg (Norm Johnson kick), 10:36 (SEA 7–0)

Second quarter

- ATL – Mick Luckhurst 25-yard field goal, 7:04 (SEA 7–3)
- ATL – Mick Luckhurst 52-yard field goal, 1:14 (SEA 7–6)

Third quarter

- ATL – Mick Luckhurst 48-yard field goal, 9:22 (ATL 9–7)
- SEA – Charle Young 32-yard pass from Dave Krieg (kick fails, Steve Largent run), 6:28 (SEA 14–9)

Fourth quarter

- SEA – Byron Walker 24-yard pass from Dave Krieg (Norm Johnson kick), 14:48 (SEA 21–9)
- ATL – Billy Johnson 12-yard pass from David Archer (Mick Luckhurst kick), 8:31 (SEA 21–16)
- ATL – Anthony Allen 37-yard pass from David Archer (Mick Luckhurst kick), 6:37 (ATL 23–21)
- ATL – Mick Luckhurst 40-yard field goal, 5:26 (ATL 26–21)
- SEA – Paul Skansi 12-yard pass from Dave Krieg (Norm Johnson kick), 0:35 (SEA 28–26)
- SEA – Safety, fumble rolls out of end zone, 0:20 (SEA 30–26)

Top passers

- ATL – David Archer: 14/27, 209 yds, 2 TD, 1 INT
- SEA – Dave Krieg: 33/51, 405 yds, 4 TD, 1 INT

Top rushers

- ATL – Gerald Riggs: 23 car, 139 yds
- SEA – Curt Warner: 12 car, 66 yds

Top receivers

- ATL – Anthony Allen: 3 rec, 81 yds, 1 TD
- SEA – Steve Largent: 8 rec, 103 yds, 1 TD

Team – pass – rush – total – to

- ATL – 187 – 163 – 350 – 1
- SEA – 358 – 63 – 421 – 3

==== Week 7: at Denver Broncos ====
Week Seven: Seattle Seahawks at Denver Broncos – Game summary

Quarter	1	2	3	4	OT	Total
Seahawks	0	0	7	3	0	10
Broncos	7	0	3	0	3	13

at Mile High Stadium, Denver, Colorado

- Date: October 20
- Game time: 2:00 pm local
- Game weather: clear, 67 °F (19 °C), 22% humidity, wind ESE 7 miles per hour (11 km/h)
- Game attendance: 74,899
- Referee: Tom Dooley
- TV announcers (NBC): Dick Enberg & Merlin Olsen
- Gamebook

Game information

First quarter

- DEN – Sammy Winder 36-yard run (Rich Karlis kick), 10:25 (DEN 7–0)

Second quarter

- No scoring plays

Third quarter

- DEN – Rich Karlis 45-yard field goal, 10:30 (DEN 10–0)
- SEA – Steve Largent 9-yard pass from Dave Krieg (Norm Johnson kick), 1:46 (DEN 10–7)

Fourth quarter

- SEA – Norm Johnson 39-yard field goal, 5:46 (Tied 10–10)

Overtime

- DEN – Rich Karlis 24-yard field goal, 5:41 (DEN 13–10)

Top passers

- SEA – Dave Krieg: 9/32, 115 yds, 1 TD, 3 INT
- DEN – John Elway: 22/43, 166 yds

Top rushers

- SEA – Curt Warner: 27 car, 136 yds
- DEN – Sammy Winder: 16 car, 69 yds, 1 TD

Top receivers

- SEA – Charle Young: 2 rec, 31 yds
- DEN – Gerald Willhite: 4 rec, 40 yds

Team – pass – rush – total – to

- SEA – 77 – 172 – 249 – 5
- DEN – 148 – 98 – 246 – 0

==== Week 8 at Jets ====
Week Eight: Seattle Seahawks (4–3) at New York Jets (5–2)

Quarter	1	2	3	4	Total
Seahawks	0	14	0	0	14
Jets	0	0	7	10	17

at Giants Stadium • East Rutherford, New Jersey

- Date: October 27
- Game time: 1:00 pm. EDT
- Game weather: Sunny • 69 °F (21 °C) • Wind SW 11 miles per hour (18 km/h; 9.6 kn) to 16 miles per hour (26 km/h; 14 kn)
- Game attendance: 69,320
- Referee: Jerry Seeman
- TV announcers (NBC): Dick Enberg and Merlin Olsen
- Gamebook

Game information

Seahawks

- Dave Krieg
  9/20, 148 Yds, TD, 2 INT
- Randall Morris
  23 Rush, 88 Yds
- Daryl Turner
  2 Rec, 78 Yds, TD

Jets

- Ken O'Brien
  13/25, 182 Yds, 2 TD, INT
- Freeman McNeil
  22 Rush, 151 Yds
- Rocky Klever
  3 Rec, 43 Yds

Scoring summary

Quarter	Time	Drive			Team	Scoring information	Score	
Quarter	Time	Plays	Yards	TOP	Team	Scoring information	SEA	NYJ
2	9:08	6	80	2:26	Seahawks	Daryl Turner 45-yard touchdown reception from Dave Krieg, Norm Johnson kick good	7	0
2	0:46				Seahawks	Fumble recovery returned 79 yards for touchdown by Jacob Green, Norm Johnson kick good	14	0
3	4:10	9	69	6:02	Jets	Freeman McNeil 16-yard touchdown reception from Ken O'Brien, Pat Leahy kick good	14	7
4	12:47	3	2	1:28	Jets	41-yard field goal by Pat Leahy	14	10
4	5:11	7	91	4:02	Jets	Wesley Walker 15-yard touchdown reception from Ken O'Brien, Pat Leahy kick good	14	17
"TOP" = time of possession. For other American football terms, see Glossary of American football.							14	17

==== Week 9: vs. Los Angeles Raiders ====
Week Nine: Seattle Seahawks vs. Los Angeles Raiders – Game summary

Quarter	1	2	3	4	Total
Raiders	0	0	3	0	3
Seahawks	3	23	7	0	33

at Kingdome, Seattle

- Date: November 3
- Game time: 1:02 pm local
- Game weather: indoors
- Game attendance: 64,060
- Referee: Chuck Heberling
- TV announcers (NBC): Charlie Jones and Merlin Olsen
- Gamebook

Game information

First quarter

- SEA – Norm Johnson 39-yard field goal, 1:47 (SEA 3–0)

Second quarter

- SEA – Curt Warner 27-yard run (PAT failed), 14:41 (SEA 9–0)
- SEA – Norm Johnson 31-yard field goal, 14:01 (SEA 12–0)
- SEA – Byron Walker 56-yard blocked field goal return (Norm Johnson kick), 9:09 (SEA 19–0)
- SEA – Terry Taylor 75-yard interception return (Norm Johnson kick), 1:14 (SEA 26–0)

Third quarter

- LA – Chris Bahr 30-yard field goal, 5:14 (SEA 26–3)
- SEA – Daryl Turner 38-yard pass from Dave Krieg (Norm Johnson kick), 0:22 (SEA 33–3)

Fourth quarter

- No scoring plays

Top passers

- LA – Marc Wilson: 15/33, 156 yds, 4 INT
- SEA – Dave Krieg: 9/21, 143 yds, 2 TD

Top rushers

- LA – Marcus Allen: 19 car, 101 yds
- SEA – Randall Morris: 12 car, 51 yds

Top receivers

- LA – Jessie Hester: 4 rec, 57 yds
- SEA – Daryl Turner: 2 rec, 47 yds, 1 TD

Team – pass – rush – total – to

- LA – 131 – 151 – 282 – 5
- SEA – 133 – 101 – 234 – 1

==== Week 10: at New Orleans Saints ====
Week Ten: Seattle Seahawks at New Orleans Saints – Game summary

Quarter	1	2	3	4	Total
Seahawks	0	7	0	20	27
Saints	3	0	0	0	3

at Superdome, New Orleans, Louisiana

- Date: November 10
- Game time: 12:01 pm local
- Game weather: indoors
- Game attendance: 47,365
- Referee: Dick Jorgensen
- TV announcers (NBC): Tom Hammond and Dave Rowe
- Gamebook

Game information

First quarter

- NO – Morten Andersen 20-yard field goal, 7:14 (NO 3–0)

Second quarter

- SEA – Curt Warner 1-yard run (Norm Johnson kick), 0:46 (SEA 7–3)

Third quarter

- No scoring plays

Fourth quarter

- SEA – Norm Johnson 32-yard field goal, 8:15 (SEA 10–3)
- SEA – Jacob Green 19-yard interception return (Norm Johnson kick), 7:10 (SEA 17–3)
- SEA – Daryl Turner 15-yard pass from Dave Krieg (Norm Johnson kick), 4:08 (SEA 24–3)
- SEA – Norm Johnson 26-yard field goal, 0:28 (SEA 27–3)

Top passers

- SEA – Dave Krieg: 21/28, 282 yds, 1 TD
- NO – Dave Wilson: 13/22, 156 yds, 1 INT

Top rushers

- SEA – Curt Warner: 23 car, 47 yds, 1 TD
- NO – Wayne Wilson: 10 car, 41 yds

Top receivers

- SEA – Steve Largent: 5 rec, 110 yds
- NO – Hoby Brenner: 3 rec, 58 yds

Team – pass – rush – total – to

- SEA – 256 – 90 – 346 – 1
- NO – 96 – 87 – 183 – 1

==== Week 11: vs. New England Patriots ====
Week Eleven: Seattle Seahawks vs. New England Patriots – Game summary

Quarter	1	2	3	4	Total
Patriots	0	7	0	13	20
Seahawks	0	3	10	0	13

at Kingdome, Seattle

- Date: November 17
- Game time: 1:02 pm local
- Game weather: indoors
- Game attendance: 60,345
- Referee: Jerry Markbreit
- TV announcers (NBC): Dick Enberg and Merlin Olsen
- Gamebook

Game information

First quarter

- No scoring plays

Second quarter

- NE – Irving Fryar 5-yard run (Tony Franklin kick), 14:55 (NE 7–0)
- SEA – Norm Johnson 32-yard field goal, 9:42 (NE 7–3)

Third quarter

- SEA – Norm Johnson 31-yard field goal, 8:02 (NE 7–6)
- SEA – Dave Krieg 3-yard run (Norm Johnson kick), 3:27 (SEA 13–7)

Fourth quarter

- NE – Craig James 23-yard pass from Steve Grogan (PAT failed), 10:35 (Tied 13–13)
- NE – Irving Fryar 13-yard pass from Steve Grogan (Tony Franklin kick), 2:39 (NE 20–13)

Top passers

- NE – Steve Grogan: 15/27, 198 yds, 2 TD, 1 INT
- SEA – Dave Krieg: 19/43, 229 yds, 3 INT

Top rushers

- NE – Craig James: 15 car, 45 yds
- SEA – Curt Warner: 24 car, 105 yds

Top receivers

- NE – Irving Fryar: 5 rec, 82 yds, 1 TD
- SEA – Steve Largent: 8 rec, 138 yds

Team – pass – rush – total – to

- NE – 198 – 87 – 285 – 2
- SEA – 189 – 135 – 324 – 4

==== Week 12: at San Francisco 49ers ====
Week Twelve: Seattle Seahawks at San Francisco 49ers – Game summary

Quarter	1	2	3	4	Total
Seahawks	0	0	0	6	6
49ers	0	12	0	7	19

at Candlestick Park, San Francisco

- Date: November 25
- Game time: 6:09 pm local
- Game weather: partly cloudy, 53 °F (12 °C), 94% humidity, wind var 1 mile per hour (1.6 km/h)
- Game attendance: 57,482
- Referee: Bob McElwee
- TV announcers (ABC): Frank Gifford, O. J. Simpson, and Joe Namath
- Gamebook

Game information

First quarter

  - No scoring plays

Second quarter

- SF – Freddie Solomon 27-yard pass from Joe Montana (Ray Wersching kick), 12:25 (SF 7–0)
- SF – Safety, John Harty tackled Curt Warner in end zone, 7:20 (SF 9–0)
- SF – Ray Wersching 32-yard field goal, 0:00 (SF 12–0)

Third quarter

- No scoring plays

Fourth quarter

- SF – Dwight Clark 22-yard pass from Joe Montana (Ray Wersching kick), 11:13 (SF 19–0)
- SEA – Sam Merriman recovered fumble in end zone (PAT failed), 1:55 (SF 19–6)

Top passers

- SEA – Dave Krieg: 11/30, 139 yds, 1 INT
- SF – Joe Montana: 17/33, 237 yds, 2 TD, 3 INT

Top rushers

- SEA – Curt Warner: 19 car, 48 yds
- SF – Wendell Tyler: 13 car, 70 yds

Top receivers

- SEA – Steve Largent: 4 rec, 91 yds
- SF – Roger Craig: 6 rec, 76 yds

Team – pass – rush – total – to

- SEA – 177 – 75 – 252 – 2
- SF – 230 – 146 – 376 – 4

==== Week 13: vs. Kansas City Chiefs ====
Week Thirteen: Seattle Seahawks vs. Kansas City Chiefs – Game summary

Quarter	1	2	3	4	Total
Chiefs	3	0	3	0	6
Seahawks	3	14	7	0	24

at Kingdome, Seattle

- Date: December 1
- Game time: 1:01 pm local
- Game weather: indoors
- Game attendance: 52,655
- Referee: Pat Haggerty
- TV announcers (NBC): Tom Hammond and Reggie Rucker
- Gamebook

Game information

First quarter

- SEA – Norm Johnson 23-yard field goal, 7:45 (SEA 3–0)
- KC – Nick Lowery 25-yard field goal, 1:20 (Tied 3–3)

Second quarter

- SEA – Dan Ross 11-yard pass from Dave Krieg (Norm Johnson kick), 5:56 (SEA 10–3)
- SEA – Curt Warner 5-yard run (Norm Johnson kick), 3:52 (SEA 17–3)

Third quarter

- KC – Nick Lowery 35-yard field goal, 6:49 (SEA 17–6)
- SEA – Steve Largent 17-yard pass from Dave Krieg (Norm Johnson kick), 2:15 (SEA 24–6)

Fourth quarter

- No scoring plays

Top passers

- KC – Todd Blackledge: 16/30, 180 yds, 3 INT
- SEA – Dave Krieg: 21/34, 254 yds, 2 TD, 1 INT

Top rushers

- KC – Todd Blackledge: 2 car, 17 yds
- SEA – Curt Warner: 19 car, 66 yds, 1 TD

Top receivers

- KC – Carlos Carson: 3 rec, 61 yds
- SEA – Steve Largent: 7 rec, 101 yds, 1 TD

Team – pass – rush – total – to

- KC – 149 – 52 – 201 – 3
- SEA – 243 – 94 – 337 – 3

==== Week 14: vs. Cleveland Browns ====
Week Fourteen: Seattle Seahawks vs. Cleveland Browns – Game summary

Quarter	1	2	3	4	Total
Browns	3	0	3	7	13
Seahawks	3	14	7	7	31

at Kingdome, Seattle

- Date: December 8
- Game time: 1:02 pm local
- Game weather: indoors
- Game attendance: 58,477
- Referee: Fred Silva
- TV announcers (NBC): Phil Stone and Reggie Rucker
- Gamebook

Game information

First quarter

- SEA – Norm Johnson 51-yard field goal, 4:42 (SEA 3–0)
- CLE – Matt Bahr 27-yard field goal, 0:28 (Tied 3–3)

Second quarter

- SEA – Dan Ross 4-yard pass from Dave Krieg (Norm Johnson kick), 9:38 (SEA 10–3)
- SEA – Daryl Turner 8-yard pass from Dave Krieg (Norm Johnson kick), 1:45 (SEA 17–3)

Third quarter

- CLE – Matt Bahr 32-yard field goal, 3:31 (SEA 17–6)
- SEA – Daryl Turner 15-yard pass from Dave Krieg (Norm Johnson kick), 0:15 (SEA 24–6)

Fourth quarter

- SEA – Steve Largent 9-yard pass from Dave Krieg (Norm Johnson kick), 14:41 (SEA 31–6)
- CLE – Glen Young 45-yard pass from Bernie Kosar (Matt Bahr kick), 2:54 (SEA 31–13)

Top passers

- CLE – Bernie Kosar: 18/31, 249 yds, 1 TD
- SEA – Dave Krieg: 24/34, 268 yds, 4 TD

Top rushers

- CLE – Kevin Mack: 9 car, 44 yds
- SEA – David Hughes: 9 car, 38 yds

Top receivers

- CLE – Earnest Byner: 6 rec, 70 yds
- SEA – Steve Largent: 5 rec, 89 yds, 1 TD

Team – pass – rush – total – to

- CLE – 214 – 92 – 306 – 4
- SEA – 246 – 92 – 338 – 1

==== Week 15: at Los Angeles Raiders ====
Week Fifteen: Seattle Seahawks at Los Angeles Raiders – Game summary

Quarter	1	2	3	4	Total
Seahawks	3	0	0	0	3
Raiders	0	6	0	7	13

at Los Angeles Memorial Coliseum, Los Angeles

- Date: December 15
- Game time: 1:00 pm local
- Game weather: partly cloudy, 71 °F (22 °C), 36% humidity, wind 0 miles per hour (0 km/h)
- Game attendance: 77,425
- Referee: Gene Barth
- TV announcers (NBC): Charlie Jones and Merlin Olsen
- Gamebook

Game information

First quarter

- SEA – Norm Johnson 37-yard field goal, 6:24 (SEA 3–)

Second quarter

- LA – Chris Bahr 22-yard field goal, 7:44 (Tied 3–3)
- LA – Chris Bahr 27-yard field goal, 0:03 (LA 6–3)

Third quarter

- No scoring plays

Fourth quarter

- LA – Marcus Allen 7-yard run (Chris Bahr kick), 6:09 (LA 13–3)

Top passers

- SEA – Dave Krieg: 16/33, 184 yds, 2 INT
- LA – Marc Wilson: 11/22, 204 yds

Top rushers

- SEA – Curt Warner: 13 car, 37 yds
- LA – Marcus Allen: 27 car, 109 yds, 1 TD

Top receivers

- SEA – Steve Largent: 4 rec, 61 yds
- LA – Dokie Williams: 3 rec, 84 yds

Team – pass – rush – total – to

- SEA – 150 – 51 – 201 – 4
- LA – 195 – 154 – 349 – 2

==== Week 16: vs. Denver Broncos ====
Week Sixteen: Seattle Seahawks vs. Denver Broncos – Game summary

Quarter	1	2	3	4	Total
Broncos	0	10	0	17	27
Seahawks	7	10	0	7	24

at Kingdome, Seattle

- Date: December 20
- Game time: 5:03 pm local
- Game weather: indoors
- Game attendance: 56,283
- Referee: Chuck Heberling
- TV announcers (ABC): Frank Gifford, O. J. Simpson, and Joe Namath
- Gamebook

Game information

First quarter

- SEA – Daryl Turner 41-yard pass from Dave Krieg (Norm Johnson kick), 6:04 (SEA 7–0)

Second quarter

- SEA – Norm Johnson 29-yard field goal, 11:33 (SEA 10–0)
- SEA – Terry Taylor 15-yard blocked punt return (Norm Johnson kick), 9:16 (SEA 17–0)
- DEN – Steve Watson 17-yard pass from John Elway (Rich Karlis kick), 5:08 (SEA 17–7)
- DEN – Rich Karlis 25-yard field goal, 0:00 (SEA 17–10)

Third quarter

- No scoring plays

Fourth quarter

- DEN – Gerald Willhite 1-yard run (Rich Karlis kick), 13:20 (Tied 17–17)
- SEA – Curt Warner 1-yard run (Norm Johnson kick), 5:20 (SEA 24–17)
- DEN – Steve Sewell 1-yard run (Rich Karlis kick), 2:35 (Tied 24–24)
- DEN – Rich Karlis 43-yard field goal, 0:55 (DEN 27–24)

Top passers

- DEN – John Elway: 24/42, 432 yds, 1 TD
- SEA – Dave Krieg: 17/40, 216 yds, 1 TD, 1 INT

Top rushers

- DEN – Sammy Winder: 9 car, 34 yds
- SEA – Curt Warner: 18 car, 92 yds, 1 TD

Top receivers

- DEN – Clint Sampson: 3 rec, 95 yds
- SEA – Steve Largent: 4 rec, 65 yds

Team – pass – rush – total – to

- DEN – 385 – 94 – 479 – 0
- SEA – 205 – 126 – 331 – 1
