= Dave Krieg =

American football quarterback (born 1958)

No. 17
- Position: Quarterback

Personal information
- Born: October 20, 1958 (age 68); Iola, Wisconsin, U.S.
- Listed height: 6 ft 1 in (1.85 m)
- Listed weight: 193 lb (88 kg)

Career information
- High school: D.C. Everest (Weston, Wisconsin)
- College: Milton (1976–1979)
- NFL draft: 1980: undrafted

Career history
- Seattle Seahawks (1980–1991); Kansas City Chiefs (1992–1993); Detroit Lions (1994); Arizona Cardinals (1995); Chicago Bears (1996); Tennessee Oilers (1997–1998)

Awards and highlights
- 3× Pro Bowl (1984, 1988, 1989); NFL completion percentage leader (1991); Seattle Seahawks Top 50 players; Seattle Seahawks Ring of Honor

Career NFL statistics
- Passing attempts: 5,311
- Passing completions: 3,105
- Completion percentage: 58.5%
- TD–INT: 261–199
- Passing yards: 38,147
- Passer rating: 81.5
- Stats at Pro Football Reference

David Michael Krieg (/ˈkreɪɡ/ KRAYG; born October 20, 1958) is an American former professional football player who was a quarterback in the National Football League (NFL). He attended Milton College in his home state of Wisconsin and made the Seattle Seahawks as an undrafted free agent. In his 18-year NFL career, Krieg played for the Seahawks (1980–1991), Kansas City Chiefs (1992–1993), Detroit Lions (1994), Arizona Cardinals (1995), Chicago Bears (1996), and Tennessee Oilers (1997–1998).

== College career ==
Krieg played college football at Milton College, a now-defunct small private college in Milton, Wisconsin. He began as the 7th-string quarterback for his school's NAIA team, the Wildcats. Given the opportunity to play in the fourth game of his freshman season, he completed four passes, three of them for touchdowns and continued to play well enough to start for the rest of his college career. He and Dave Kraayeveld (who also played for the Seattle Seahawks) are the only NFL players to have attended Milton College.

== Professional career ==
In 18 seasons, Krieg played in 213 games, and completed 58.5 percent of his passes (3,105 of 5,311) for 38,147 passing yards, 261 touchdowns, 199 interceptions and an 81.5 rating. He also had 417 rushing attempts for 1,261 yards and 13 touchdowns and 3 pass receptions for 10 yards. His regular season career win–loss record is 98–77.

Dave Krieg played in 12 postseason games (9 as a starter), and completed 51.1 percent of his passes (144 for 282) for 1,895 passing yards, 11 touchdowns, 10 interceptions and a 70.86 rating. He also had 17 rushing attempts for 20 yards and 1 touchdown.

=== Seattle Seahawks ===
Undrafted in 1980, Krieg tried out for the Seahawks and caught on as a third-string quarterback. He saw the field only once, taking a few snaps with two incompletions in the final game in 1980, the Seahawks' ninth straight loss in a disappointing 4–12 season in which they lost all eight home games.

By the middle of the 1981 season, Krieg overtook Sam Adkins on the depth chart to become the Seahawks' second-string quarterback. When injuries sidelined Jim Zorn late in the season, Krieg started the last three games and played well, helping the team record two of its six wins that year. In his first NFL start against the New York Jets on December 6, Krieg ran for one touchdown and threw for two others, including a 57-yard game-winning completion to Steve Largent.

Krieg began the strike-shortened 1982 season as the Seahawks' starting quarterback and played respectably until a thumb injury sidelined him for several weeks. Zorn reclaimed his former role, but played inconsistently. When Zorn continued to struggle in the final game of the season, Coach Mike McCormack inserted Krieg, who rallied Seattle to a victory over the Denver Broncos.

Returning to the bench at the outset of the 1983 campaign, Krieg remained there until Zorn's performance faltered in midseason. At that point, head coach Chuck Knox named Krieg the Seahawks' new starting quarterback. The Milton product's consistent play complemented the considerable talents of All-Pro wide receiver Steve Largent and Pro Bowl running back Curt Warner, allowing the Seahawks to make the playoffs for the first time in the team's eighth season. Krieg played brilliantly in the wild card round of the playoffs, helping his team rout Steve DeBerg and the Broncos in the Kingdome. The next week, Krieg's steady performance helped the Seahawks upset Dan Marino and the Miami Dolphins on the road. However, Krieg and Seahawks offense were overwhelmed by the aggressive defense of the L.A. Raiders in the American Football Conference Championship Game. Knox replaced Krieg with Jim Zorn to finish out the game as the visiting Seahawks lost to the Raiders, who went on to win Super Bowl XVIII.

Despite a prodigious effort by Mike McCormack to recruit Warren Moon to join the QB ranks in Seattle, Krieg resumed his starting role 1984 after Moon declined Seattle's offer and chose to play for the Houston Oilers instead. In the year's first game, a knee injury sidelined the Seahawks' star running back Curt Warner for the rest of the season, forcing Coach Knox to discard his run-oriented "Ground Chuck" offense and adopt a new, more pass-intensive philosophy "Air Knox." Rising to the occasion, Krieg threw for 3,671 yards and 32 touchdowns, leading his team to a 12–4 record and another wild card playoff appearance. In recognition of this impressive performance, Krieg's NFL peers named him to his first Pro Bowl. Moreover, his steady play helped the Seahawks eliminate the reigning Super Bowl champion Raiders in a wild card showdown in the Kingdome. Krieg also played well in Miami the following week, but the Dolphins defeated the Seahawks and went on to lose Super Bowl XIX.

Krieg's inconsistency contributed to the mediocrity of the Seahawks in 1985. In the team's eight victories, Krieg's passer rating averaged more than 114—an excellent mark—but in their eight losses, his rating hovered just above a dismal 40.

In 1986, Krieg played well initially, leading the Seahawks to a 5–3 record. However, he faltered in midseason, so Coach Knox benched him in favor of Gale Gilbert. When that remedy failed to avert a four-game losing streak, Knox gave Krieg another chance. Nicknamed "Mudbone" by his Seattle teammates, Krieg led the Seahawks on five-game winning streak to finish the season, during which his passer rating exceeded 126. That December, Krieg was named AFC Player of the Month. However, the 10-6 Seahawks failed to qualify for the playoffs.

Despite a brief midseason slump, Krieg played more consistently during the strike-shortened 1987 season. In the year's first game, Krieg set a team record by throwing his 108th touchdown; in less than four years as a starter, Krieg had broken a record Zorn had compiled over more than seven starting seasons. Krieg proceeded to lead the Seahawks to another playoff appearance, but Krieg's performance failed to prevent a narrow loss on the road in the first round against the Houston Oilers.

During the offseason, the Seahawks acquired Kelly Stouffer from the Phoenix Cardinals, and began to groom him as the franchise quarterback of the future.

Perhaps due to this increased competition, Krieg's consistency increased further in 1988. Although he missed seven games with a separated shoulder, his excellent play helped propel the Seahawks to their first AFC West Division Championship. In the regular season finale, Krieg dissected the Raiders' secondary, throwing for 410 yards and four touchdowns, thereby securing the division title at 9–7 and relegating the Raiders to a wild card berth. However, Krieg's pedestrian performance on the road in the playoffs contributed to the Seahawks' swift elimination at the hands of the top-seeded Cincinnati Bengals. Nevertheless, Krieg's strong regular season showing earned him another Pro Bowl appearance.

In the spring of 1989, Krieg competed in NBC's prestigious Superstars competition, a series of physical challenges pitting athletes from various sports against one another. Krieg placed third overall, behind Willie Gault and Herschel Walker. He placed first in the basketball and rowing events, beating athletes including Gault, Walker, Randall Cunningham, Evander Holyfield, and Carl Lewis.

In 1989, Krieg struggled to lead an offense depleted by injuries. All-Pro Steve Largent missed several games because of a fractured elbow. The running game sputtered as injuries slowed Curt Warner, and the aging offensive line struggled to open holes for him. Krieg came to rely on fullback John L. Williams after Largent retired that season. Although the Seahawks managed only a 7–9 record, Krieg played well enough to earn a return trip to the Pro Bowl, where he performed impressively, helping lead the AFC to victory.

Krieg's burden grew heavier in 1990, with the retirement of Largent and the continued decline of the offensive line and the running game. Consequently, inconsistency again plagued Krieg. His play ranged from awful (2 games with passer ratings below 15) to mediocre (5 games in the 50s and 60s) to good (4 games in the 70s, 80s, or 90s) to brilliant (5 games with ratings over 100). In the most memorable game of the season, on November 11, the Seahawks made their annual visit to Arrowhead Stadium, where they had not won since 1980. The Kansas City Chiefs sacked Krieg 9 times, including an NFL-record 7 sacks by linebacker Derrick Thomas. However, on the last play of the game, as time expired, Thomas closed in for yet another apparent sack, but Krieg eluded the linebacker and threw a 25-yard touchdown pass to wide receiver Paul Skansi for the win. Krieg's leadership helped the Seahawks compile a respectable 9–7 record in 1990, but they again missed the playoffs.

In the 1991 NFL draft, the Seahawks used their first-round pick on another quarterback of the future, Dan McGwire.

After breaking his thumb in the season opener, Krieg missed six games in 1991. Without a strong supporting cast, Krieg turned in another inconsistent year. The Seahawks finished a disappointing 7–9, leading to the resignation of Coach Knox. Seattle General Manager Tom Flores decided to retain Stouffer and McGwire, and to let Krieg become a free agent. That decision helped doom the Seahawks to several seasons of misery and mediocrity under a succession of uninspired quarterbacks. Despite having an outstanding defense in 1992, their overall record of 2–14 (.125) remains the worst in franchise history.

=== Kansas City Chiefs ===
Krieg signed with the Seahawks' division rivals, the Kansas City Chiefs, and started for them throughout 1992, leading his new team to a 10–6 record, including two victories over Seattle. However, Krieg's poor performance in the playoffs on the road contributed to the wild-card Chiefs' swift elimination by the San Diego Chargers.

In the offseason, the Chiefs signed Joe Montana and made him their starting quarterback. However, Krieg still saw substantial action in 1993, relieving Montana in six games, and starting five games for the oft-injured Hall of Famer. Together, Montana and Krieg led the Chiefs to an 11–5 record and an AFC West Championship. In the wild-card round of the playoffs, when the Chiefs hosted the Pittsburgh Steelers, an injured Montana briefly left the game. In relief, Krieg threw just one pass, a 23-yard touchdown. Two weeks later, at the AFC Championship Game in Buffalo, Montana sustained a concussion and left the game in the third quarter. Krieg led a 90-yard touchdown drive to bring the Chiefs within 7 points, but the Buffalo Bills scored 10 unanswered points in the fourth quarter to qualify for their fourth straight Super Bowl appearance.

=== Detroit Lions ===
In 1994, Krieg signed with the Detroit Lions to back up Scott Mitchell. Although Mitchell's erratic play contributed to the team's poor 4–5 start, coach Wayne Fontes stuck with the young quarterback as his starter until an injury sidelined him in mid-season. Krieg came off the bench and ignited a dynamic offense showcasing the talents of running back Barry Sanders and wide receiver Herman Moore. Statistically, the 1994 season was the best of Krieg's career: Krieg completed 61.8% of his passes and threw 14 touchdowns versus only 3 interceptions, for a passer rating of 101.7. Moreover, Krieg's leadership rallied the Lions to a 5–2 regular season finish and a wild card playoff berth. Despite Krieg's solid play, the visiting Lions lost narrowly to the Green Bay Packers in the first round of the playoffs. Although Krieg had set Detroit Lions regular-season records for fewest passes intercepted (3) and highest passer rating (101.7), the team decided to stick with Mitchell and let Krieg become a free agent.

=== Arizona Cardinals ===
The Arizona Cardinals rewarded Krieg for his 1994 performance by signing him to be their starting quarterback in 1995. However, operating behind a porous offensive line, Krieg had another inconsistent year. Again, his passer rating told the tale: 3 horrible games (below 50), 4 mediocre ones (50s and 60s), 5 good efforts (70s and 80s), and 4 outstanding performances (90s or better). However, even Krieg's good games rarely resulted in Cardinals victories. The team went 4–12, which resulted in head coach Buddy Ryan and Krieg losing their jobs.

=== Chicago Bears ===
In 1996, the Chicago Bears signed Krieg to back up Erik Kramer, who started until a week four injury sidelined him for the remainder of the season. Krieg, 38 years old, came off the bench and helped rally an injury-wracked Bears team to a 6–6 finish. Statistically, Krieg's performance was inconsistent: his passer rating varied from 4 games below 60, 2 games in the 60s, 3 games in the 80s and 90s, to 3 games over 100.

=== Tennessee Oilers ===
Dave Krieg finished his career with the Tennessee Oilers, backing up the seldom-injured Steve McNair in 1997 and 1998. Even when the young starter played poorly, coach Jeff Fisher declined to insert Krieg. On rare occasions, Krieg would mop up in garbage time or take a knee at the end of a game.

However, in the 1998 season opener in Cincinnati, McNair exited the game with a bruised elbow. Krieg—by then nearly 40 years old—came off the bench to rally the Oilers to victory, going 7-of-13 for 129 yards. Although McNair recovered from his injury and could have re-entered the game, the team let Krieg finish. "Dave was in the zone", McNair explained. "He was doing a great job moving the team up and down the field. It's a matter of doing what's right (for the team). At that time, what was right was letting Dave stay in."

Later that month, the Jacksonville Jaguars knocked McNair out of a game, but Krieg's comeback effort failed. He went 1-of-3 for 10 yards while being sacked twice. He appeared in two other games, going 3-of-3 for 57 yards in relief during a 44–14 blowout of Cincinnati and going 1-of-2 for 3 yards in a loss to the Jets. His final completion was to Mike Archie, done in the final quarter.

Krieg was released by the rechristened Tennessee Titans in July 1999 after the team signed Neil O'Donnell to backup McNair. Krieg was not in training camp that season, but intended on playing a 20th NFL season. He wouldn't make his retirement official until 2000 after no takers emerged for his services. He retired as a Seahawk, and held his press conference in Cheney because it was the site of his first camp in 1980. Head coach Mike Holmgren said of Krieg, "I always wanted him to play for me, but he was way too expensive every year."

== NFL career statistics ==
Legend
	Pro Bowl selection
	Led the league
	NFL record
**Bold**	Career high

=== Regular season ===
Year	Team	Games			Passing									Sacked	
Year	Team	GP	GS	Record	Cmp	Att	Pct	Yds	Avg	TD	Int	Lng	Rtg	Sck	SckY
1980	SEA	1	0	−	0	2	0.0	0	0.0	0	0	0	39.6	1	6
1981	SEA	7	3	2−1	64	112	57.1	843	7.5	7	5	57	83.3	11	85
1982	SEA	3	2	0−2	49	78	62.8	501	6.4	2	2	44	79.1	16	117
1983	SEA	9	8	5−3	147	243	60.5	2,139	8.8	18	11	50	95.0	38	279
1984	SEA	**16**	**16**	**12−4**	276	480	57.5	**3,671**	7.6	**32**	**24**	**80**	83.3	40	314
1985	SEA	**16**	**16**	8−8	285	**532**	53.6	3,602	6.8	27	20	54	76.2	52	**448**
1986	SEA	15	14	10−4	225	375	60.0	2,921	7.8	21	11	72	91.0	35	281
1987	SEA	12	12	7−5	178	294	60.5	2,131	7.2	23	15	75	87.6	27	247
1988	SEA	9	9	6−3	134	228	58.8	1,741	7.6	18	8	75	94.6	12	92
1989	SEA	15	14	7−7	286	499	57.3	3,309	6.6	21	20	60	74.8	37	289
1990	SEA	**16**	**16**	9–7	265	448	59.2	3,194	7.1	15	20	63	73.6	40	360
1991	SEA	10	9	4–5	187	285	**65.6**	2,080	7.3	11	12	60	82.5	32	216
1992	KC	**16**	**16**	10–6	230	413	55.7	3,115	7.5	15	12	77	79.9	48	323
1993	KC	12	5	3−2	105	189	55.6	1,238	6.6	7	3	66	81.4	22	138
1994	DET	14	7	5−2	131	212	61.8	1,629	7.7	14	3	51	**101.7**	14	100
1995	ARI	**16**	**16**	4–12	**304**	521	58.3	3,554	6.8	16	21	48	72.6	**53**	380
1996	CHI	13	12	6–6	226	377	59.9	2,278	6.0	14	12	53	76.3	14	104
1997	TEN	8	0	–	1	2	50.0	2	1.0	0	0	2	56.2	0	0
1998	TEN	5	0	–	12	21	57.1	199	**9.5**	0	0	55	89.2	2	15
Career		213	175	98−77	3,105	5,311	58.5	38,147	7.2	261	199	80	81.5	494	3,794

=== Playoffs ===
Year	Team	Games			Passing								
Year	Team	GP	GS	Record	Cmp	Att	Pct	Yds	Avg	TD	Int	Lng	Rtg
1983	SEA	**3**	**3**	**2−1**	**30**	**50**	**60.0**	**404**	**8.1**	**4**	4	41	79.1
1984	SEA	2	2	1–1	24	45	53.3	304	6.8	2	**0**	**56**	**89.5**
1987	SEA	1	1	0−1	16	38	42.1	237	6.2	2	**0**	33	80.7
1988	SEA	1	1	0–1	24	**50**	48.0	297	5.9	1	2	37	56.8
1992	KC	1	1	0−1	16	34	47.1	233	6.9	0	2	28	45.3
1993	KC	3	0	−	17	30	56.7	221	7.4	1	1	27	77.2
1994	DET	1	1	0−1	17	35	48.6	199	5.7	1	**0**	46	75.8
Career		12	9	3−6	144	282	51.1	1,895	6.7	11	9	56	72.3

== Notable accomplishments ==
- One of three quarterbacks to record at least 20,000 yards, 169 touchdowns, and 57 wins as a starter in the 1980s, joining hall of famers Dan Marino and Joe Montana
- Holds Seahawks record for most games with 400 or more yards passing (4)
- Had two games with a perfect passer rating.
- Led three different franchises to the playoffs (Seattle Seahawks, Kansas City Chiefs, Detroit Lions)

== Other ==
Krieg held the NFL record for most career fumbles. Krieg has now been surpassed by both Brett Favre and Warren Moon for career fumbles.

Krieg long kept the origin of his nickname, "Mudbone", a secret. Jim Zorn outed him. His nickname was nominated by teammate Byron "Bones" Walker, and overwhelmingly voted in by his team. The name comes from the Richard Pryor character Mudbone.

== Since retirement ==
Krieg is now a motivational speaker and real estate investor in Phoenix, Arizona.

Krieg was a color commentator for the NFL on FOX from 2001 to 2002.

He was inducted into the Seattle Seahawks Ring of Honor in 2004.

Krieg also became part owner of the af2's Green Bay Blizzard in 2007 along with former Green Bay Packer linebacker Brian Noble.

In January 2017, Krieg raised the 12 Flag atop the Space Needle a few days before the Seahawks defeated the Detroit Lions, 26–6, in an NFL Wild Card playoff game.
