= Dan Doornink =

American football player (1956–2026)

No. 35, 33
- Position: Running back

Personal information
- Born: February 1, 1956; Yakima, Washington, U.S.
- Died: October 31, 2026 (aged 70); Spokane, Washington, U.S.
- Listed height: 6 ft 3 in (1.91 m)
- Listed weight: 210 lb (95 kg)

Career information
- High school: Wapato (Wapato, Washington)
- College: Washington State
- NFL draft: 1978: 7th round, 174th overall pick

Career history
- New York Giants (1978); Seattle Seahawks (1979–1985)

Career NFL statistics
- Rushing yards: 1,836
- Rushing average: 3.5
- Rushing touchdowns: 15
- Stats at Pro Football Reference

Daniel Glenn Doornink (February 1, 1956 – October 31, 2026) was an American professional football player who was a running back in the National Football League (NFL). He played college football for the Washington State Cougars. He played one season in the NFL for the New York Giants and seven seasons for the Seattle Seahawks.

== Biography ==
Born in Yakima, Washington, Doornink graduated from Wapato High School in 1974 and played college football at Washington State University in Pullman. He was selected in the seventh round of the 1978 NFL draft (174th overall) by the Giants, then was traded to the Seahawks in August 1979 for a draft choice.

Seahawks fans gave him the nicknames of "Dr. Dan" for his medical career, and "Mr. Third Down" for his knack of frequently picking up a first down for the team on third down when given the ball via run or pass. He ran for 123 yards on 27 carries for the Seahawks in a wild-card playoff win over the Los Angeles Raiders on December 22, 1984 in the Kingdome in Seattle. After a series of injuries in 1985, Doornink was released by the Seahawks in August 1986.

Doornink earned his M.D. at the University of Washington in Seattle and practiced internal medicine as a physician in Yakima. He and his wife, Sharon, have four children, Heidi, Danielle, Tyler, and Grace. He was inducted into the WSU Athletics Hall of Fame in 1986. Prior to the Seahawks August 25, 2007 preseason game against the Minnesota Vikings at Qwest Field in Seattle, he raised the 12th Man flag.

In August 2021, Doornink was hospitalized for COVID-19. Although vaccinated, he had an autoimmune blood disorder which made him more susceptible to complications. Doornink was placed on a ventilator and then removed from it when his breathing improved. After being released from the hospital, he needed months of recovery. He died in Spokane, Washington, on October 31, 2026, at the age of 70.
