= Daryl Turner =

American football player (born 1961)

No. 81
- Position: Wide receiver

Personal information
- Born: December 15, 1961 (age 64); Wadley, Georgia, U.S.
- Listed height: 6 ft 3 in (1.91 m)
- Listed weight: 194 lb (88 kg)

Career information
- College: Michigan State
- NFL draft: 1984: 2nd round, 49th overall pick

Career history
- Seattle Seahawks (1984–1987)

Awards and highlights
- NFL receiving touchdowns leader (1985); PFWA All-Rookie Team (1984)

Career NFL statistics
- Receptions: 101
- Receiving yards: 1,872
- Receiving touchdowns: 36
- Stats at Pro Football Reference

Daryl Turner (born December 15, 1961) is an American former professional football player who was a wide receiver for the Seattle Seahawks of the National Football League (NFL) for four years. He played college football for the Michigan State Spartans.

== Early life ==
Turner attended Flint Southwestern High School, now known as Flint Southwestern Academy.

== College statistics ==
- 1980: 11 catches for 236 yards and 2 TD.
- 1981: 31 catches for 653 yards and 4 TD.
- 1982: 8 catches for 139 yards and 2 TD.
- 1983: 28 catches for 549 yards and 5 TD. 3 carries for 5 yards.

== Professional career ==
Turner was selected in the second round of the 1984 NFL draft by the Seattle Seahawks. Turner set three franchise records for the Seattle Seahawks for highest yard average per-catch in a career (18.53), most receiving touchdowns in a season (13), and most receiving touchdowns for a rookie (10). He amassed 23 touchdowns on 69 receptions over his first two seasons in the NFL. Turner's production declined in his next two seasons, which he attributed to alcohol and drug abuse. The Seahawks attempted to trade Turner to the Cleveland Browns for an undisclosed draft pick after the 1987 NFL season. The trade was voided after Turner failed a physical examination and the Seahawks released him. Turner subsequently entered a drug rehabilitation program. The San Francisco 49ers offered Turner a tryout before the 1988 NFL season, but he failed to secure a roster spot.

== NFL career statistics ==
Legend
	Led the league
**Bold**	Career high

=== Regular season ===
Year	Team	Games		Receiving				
Year	Team	GP	GS	Rec	Yds	Avg	Lng	TD
1984	SEA	**16**	8	**35**	**715**	**20.4**	**80**	10
1985	SEA	**16**	**12**	34	670	19.7	54	**13**
1986	SEA	15	**12**	18	334	18.6	72	7
1987	SEA	12	8	14	153	10.9	20	6
		59	40	101	1,872	18.5	80	36

=== Playoffs ===
Year	Team	Games		Receiving				
Year	Team	GP	GS	Rec	Yds	Avg	Lng	TD
1984	SEA	**2**	0	**4**	**64**	**16.0**	**26**	**1**
1987	SEA	1	0	0	0	0.0	0	0
		3	0	4	64	16.0	26	1
