= 1984 Los Angeles Raiders season =

NFL team season

- Owner: Al Davis
- General manager: Al Davis
- Head coach: Tom Flores
- Home stadium: L.A. Memorial Coliseum

Results
- Record: 11–5
- Division place: 3rd AFC West
- Playoffs: Lost Wild Card Playoffs (at Seahawks) 7–13
- All-Pros: 4: DE Howie Long; OLB Rod Martin; CB Mike Haynes; S Vann McElroy
- Pro Bowlers: 8: TE Todd Christensen; CB Lester Hayes; RB Marcus Allen; OT Henry Lawrence; DE Howie Long; OLB Rod Martin; FS Vann McElroy; CB Mike Haynes

The 1984 Los Angeles Raiders season was the franchise's 25th season overall, and the franchise's 15th season in the National Football League (NFL). The Raiders entered the season as defending Super Bowl champions. However, they failed to improve upon their previous season's output of 12–4, winning only eleven games. Despite finishing third in their division, the team qualified for the playoffs for the third consecutive season. However, their season would quickly end, as they lost in the wild card game 13–7 to division rival Seattle Seahawks.

== Staff / Coaches ==
1984 Los Angeles Raiders staff
Front office: Owner – Al Davis; General manager – Al Davis; Head coaches: Head coach – Tom Flores; Offensive coaches: Quarterbacks – Larry Kennan; Running backs – Ray Willsey; Assistant running backs – Terry Robiskie; Wide receivers – Tom Walsh; Tight ends – Bob Mischak; Offensive line – Sam Boghosian; Assistant offensive line – Art Shell	Defensive coaches: Defensive line – Earl Leggett; Linebackers – Charlie Sumner; Defensive backs – Willie Brown; Defensive backs – Chet Franklin; Special teams coaches: Special teams coordinator – Steve Ortmayer; Strength and conditioning: Head strength and conditioning – Bob Mischak

== Roster ==
1984 Los Angeles Raiders roster
Quarterbacks (QB): 16 Jim Plunkett; 6 Marc Wilson; Running backs (RB): 32 Marcus Allen; 27 Frank Hawkins; 31 Derrick Jensen; 33 Kenny King; 28 Cleo Montgomery; 34 Greg Pruitt; 38 Chester Willis; Wide receivers (WR): 80 Malcolm Barnwell; 21 Cliff Branch; 88 Sam Seale; 85 Dokie Williams; Tight ends (TE): 87 Dave Casper; 46 Todd Christensen	Offensive linemen (OL): 66 Warren Bryant T; 50 Dave Dalby C; 79 Bruce Davis T; 73 Charley Hannah G; 70 Henry Lawrence T; 60 Curt Marsh G; 65 Mickey Marvin G; 76 Ed Muransky T; 67 Dwight Wheeler G; Defensive linemen (DL): 97 Rick Ackerman NT; 77 Lyle Alzado DE; 99 Sean Jones DE; 62 Reggie Kinlaw NT; 75 Howie Long DE; 71 Bill Pickel NT; 93 Greg Townsend DE	Linebackers (LB): 56 Jeff Barnes OLB; 54 Darryl Byrd ILB; 57 Tony Caldwell OLB; 53 Rod Martin OLB; 52 Mark Merrill ILB; 55 Matt Millen ILB; 58 Jack Squirek ILB; 91 Brad Van Pelt OLB; Defensive backs (DB): 36 Mike Davis SS; 45 James Davis CB; 37 Lester Hayes CB; 22 Mike Haynes CB; 26 Vann McElroy FS; 23 Odis McKinney FS; 30 Stacey Toran SS; 20 Ted Watts CB; Special teams (ST): 10 Chris Bahr K; 8 Ray Guy P	Reserve: 59 Stan Adams LB (IR); 11 David Humm QB (IR); 74 Shelby Jordan T (IR); 43 Joe McCall RB (IR); 72 Don Mosebar G (IR); 51 Bob Nelson LB (IR); 81 Andy Parker TE (IR); -- Jeff Simmons WR (IR); 49 Ricky Williams S (IR); 98 Mitch Willis NT (IR); Rookies in italics

== Schedule ==
Week	Date	Opponent	Result	Record	Venue	Attendance
1	September 2	at Houston Oilers	**W** 24–14	1–0	Astrodome	49,092
2	September 9	Green Bay Packers	**W** 28–7	2–0	Los Angeles Memorial Coliseum	46,269
3	September 16	at **Kansas City Chiefs**	**W** 22–20	3–0	Arrowhead Stadium	75,111
4	September 24	**San Diego Chargers**	**W** 33–30	4–0	Los Angeles Memorial Coliseum	76,131
5	September 30	at **Denver Broncos**	**L** 13–16	4–1	Mile High Stadium	74,833
6	October 7	**Seattle Seahawks**	**W** 28–14	5–1	Los Angeles Memorial Coliseum	77,904
7	October 14	Minnesota Vikings	**W** 23–20	6–1	Los Angeles Memorial Coliseum	49,276
8	October 21	at **San Diego Chargers**	**W** 44–37	7–1	Jack Murphy Stadium	57,442
9	October 28	**Denver Broncos**	**L** 19–22 (OT)	7–2	Los Angeles Memorial Coliseum	91,020
10	November 4	at Chicago Bears	**L** 6–17	7–3	Soldier Field	59,858
11	November 12	at **Seattle Seahawks**	**L** 14–17	7–4	Kingdome	64,001
12	November 18	**Kansas City Chiefs**	**W** 17–7	8–4	Los Angeles Memorial Coliseum	48,575
13	November 25	Indianapolis Colts	**W** 21–7	9–4	Los Angeles Memorial Coliseum	40,289
14	December 2	at Miami Dolphins	**W** 45–34	10–4	Miami Orange Bowl	71,222
15	December 10	at Detroit Lions	**W** 24–3	11–4	Pontiac Silverdome	66,710
16	December 16	Pittsburgh Steelers	**L** 7–13	11–5	Los Angeles Memorial Coliseum	83,056
Note: Intra-division opponents are in **bold** text.

== Game summaries ==
=== Week 1 ===
Team	1	2	3	4	Total
• Raiders	0	0	13	11	24
Oilers	0	7	0	7	14

- Date: September 2
- Location: Houston Astrodome, Houston, Texas
- Game start: 3:00 p.m.
- Game weather: indoors (dome)
- Referee: Chuck Heberling
- TV announcers (NBC): Dick Enberg and Merlin Olsen

Scoring summary
2	HOU	Mike Holston 10 yard pass from Warren Moon (Florian Kempf kick)	Oilers 7–0
3	LA	Marcus Allen 1 yard run (kick failed)	Oilers 7–6
3	LA	Frank Hawkins 1 yard run (Chris Bahr kick)	Raiders 13–7
4	LA	Jim Plunkett 1 yard run (pass failed)	Raiders 19–7
4	LA	Chris Bahr 28 yard field goal	Raiders 22–7
4	LA	Safety, holding penalty in end zone	Raiders 24–7
4	HOU	Mike McCloskey 5 yard pass from Warren Moon (Florian Kempf kick)	Raiders 24–14

=== Week 2 ===
Team	1	2	3	4	Total
Packers	0	7	0	0	7
• Raiders	7	0	7	14	28

- Date: September 9
- Location: Los Angeles Memorial Coliseum, Los Angeles
- Game start: 1:00 p.m.
- Game weather: 85 °F (29 °C); wind 9 mph (14 km/h)
- Referee: Red Cashion
- Television network: CBS

Scoring summary
Q1	LA	Todd Christensen 3 yard pass from Jim Plunkett (Chris Bahr kick)	LA 7–0
Q2	GB	Ed West 7 yard pass from Randy Wright (Eddie Garcia kick)	Tie 7–7
Q3	LA	Frank Hawkins 1 yard run (Chris Bahr kick)	LA 14–7
Q4	LA	Marcus Allen 7 yard run (Chris Bahr kick)	LA 21–7
Q4	LA	Derrick Jensen 1 yard run (Chris Bahr kick)	LA 28–7

==== Week 10: at Chicago Bears ====
Quarter	1	2	3	4	Total
Raiders	0	3	3	0	6
Bears	7	7	0	3	17

at Soldier Field, Chicago, Illinois

- Date: Sunday, November 4
- Game time: 12:00 p.m.
- Game weather: 51 °F (11 °C), wind 18 mph (29 km/h)
- Referee: Pat Haggerty
- TV announcers (NBC): Dick Enberg and Merlin Olsen
- Pro-Football-Reference.com

Game information

First quarter

- CHI – Walter Payton 18-yard run (Bob Thomas kick) – Bears 7–0

Second quarter

- CHI – Walter Payton 8-yard run (Bob Thomas kick) – Bears 14–0
- LA – Chris Bahr 44-yard field goal – Bears 14–3

Third quarter

- LA – Chris Bahr 40-yard field goal – Bears 14–6

Fourth quarter

- CHI – Bob Thomas 29-yard field goal – Bears 17–6

Raiders

- Marc Wilson
  7/19, 70 Yds, 2 INT
- Marcus Allen
  15 Rush, 42 Yds
- Todd Christensen
  5 Rec, 61 Yds

Bears

- Jim McMahon
  3/11, 68 Yds, INT
- Walter Payton
  27 Rush, 111 Yds, 2 TD
- Willie Gault
  1 Rec, 50 Yds

== Playoffs ==
=== Schedule ===
Round	Date	Opponent (seed)	Result	Venue	Attendance	Game recap
Wild Card	December 22	at Seattle Seahawks (4)	L 7–13	Kingdome	62,049	Recap

=== Game summaries ===
==== AFC Wild Card Playoffs: at (No. 4) Seattle Seahawks ====
AFC Wild Card Playoffs: (No. 5) Los Angeles Raiders at (No. 4) Seattle Seahawks – Game summary

Quarter	1	2	3	4	Total
Raiders	0	0	0	7	7
Seahawks	0	7	3	3	13

at Kingdome, Seattle, Washington

- Date: December 22, 1984
- Game time: 1:00 p.m. PST
- Game weather: Played indoors
- Game attendance: 62,049
- Referee: Dick Jorgensen
- TV announcers (NBC): Charlie Jones and Bob Griese

Game information

First quarter

- No scoring plays

Second quarter

- SEA – Turner 26 pass from Krieg (Johnson kick) SEA 7–0

Third quarter

- SEA – field goal Johnson 35 SEA 10–0

Fourth quarter

- SEA – field goal Johnson 44 SEA 13–0
- RAI – Allen 46 pass from Plunkett (Bahr kick) SEA 13–7

Top passers

- RAI –
- SEA –

Top rushers

- RAI –
- SEA –

Top receivers

- RAI –
- SEA –

== Standings ==
AFC West
	W	L	T	PCT	DIV	CONF	PF	PA	STK
Denver Broncos^{(2)}	13	3	0	.813	6–2	10–2	353	241	W2
Seattle Seahawks^{(4)}	12	4	0	.750	5–3	8–4	418	282	L2
Los Angeles Raiders^{(5)}	11	5	0	.688	5–3	8–4	368	278	L1
Kansas City Chiefs	8	8	0	.500	4–4	7–7	314	324	W3
San Diego Chargers	7	9	0	.438	0–8	3–9	394	413	L2
