= Raiders–Seahawks rivalry =

National Football League rivalry

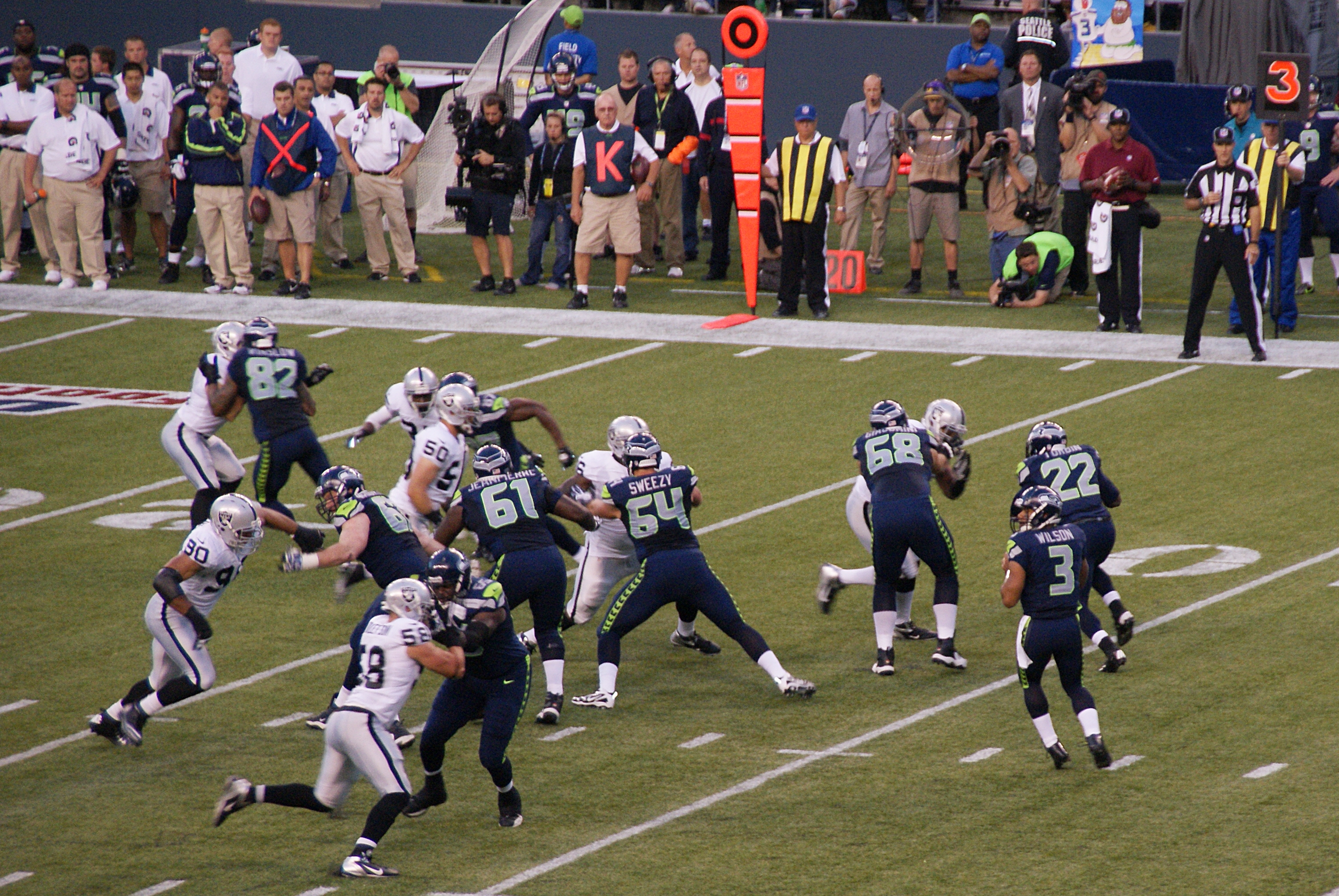
- The 2012 game between the Raiders and Seahawks

- Las Vegas Raiders Seattle Seahawks
- Location: Las Vegas, Seattle
- First meeting: November 6, 1977; Raiders 44, Seahawks 7
- Latest meeting: November 15, 2026; Seahawks 21, Raiders 13
- Stadiums: Raiders: Allegiant Stadium; Seahawks: Lumen Field

Statistics
- Total meetings: 57
- All-time series: Raiders: 30–27
- Regular season series: Raiders: 29–26
- Postseason results: Tie: 1–1
- Largest victory: Raiders: 44–7 (1977); Seahawks: 37–0 (1986)
- Most points scored: Raiders: 44 (1977); Seahawks: 45 (1997)
- Longest win streak: Raiders: 8 (1990–1993); Seahawks: 4 (1978–1979, 1988–1989)
- Current win streak: Seahawks: 1 (2026–present)

Post-season history
- 1983 AFC Championship: Raiders won: 30–14; 1984 AFC Wild Card: Seahawks won: 13–7

The Raiders–Seahawks rivalry is an American football rivalry in the National Football League (NFL) between the Las Vegas Raiders and the Seattle Seahawks. The teams were AFC West divisional rivals from 1977 until 2001, after which the Seahawks moved to the NFC West.

== Notable events ==
=== 1983 AFC Championship Game ===
The Seattle Seahawks made their first playoff appearance in 1983. After defeating the Denver Broncos in the wildcard and the Miami Dolphins in the divisional, the Seahawks met the Los Angeles Raiders in the AFC Championship Game. Although the Seahawks had already won the matchup twice in the regular season, the Raiders won the playoff game 30–14 and would go on to win their third Super Bowl.

=== 1984 Wild Card Game ===
In a rematch of the previous year's conference championship, Seahawks defeated the Raiders 13–7 in the wild card round.

== Season-by-season results ==
Oakland/Los Angeles/Las Vegas Raiders vs. Seattle Seahawks season-by-season results
1970s (Seahawks, 4–1)

Season	Results	Location	Overall series	Notes
1977	Raiders; 44–7	Oakland–Alameda County Coliseum	Raiders; 1–0	The Seahawks join the NFL as an expansion team and are placed in the NFC West. The following season, they were moved to the AFC West, where they remained through 2001.
1978	Seahawks; 27–7	Kingdome	Seahawks; 2–1	
1978	Seahawks; 17–16	Oakland–Alameda County Coliseum	Seahawks; 2–1	
1979	Seahawks; 27–10	Kingdome	Seahawks; 4–1	
1979	Seahawks; 29–24	Oakland–Alameda County Coliseum	Seahawks; 4–1	

1980s (Seahawks, 11–10)

Season	Season series	at Oakland/Los Angeles Raiders	at Seattle Seahawks	Overall series	Notes
1980	Raiders 2–0	Raiders; 33–14	Raiders; 19–17	Seahawks; 4–3	Raiders win Super Bowl XV.
1981	Raiders 2–0	Raiders; 20–10	Raiders; 32–31	Raiders; 5–4	
1982	Raiders 1–0	Raiders; 28–23	no game	Raiders; 6–4	Game in Seattle was canceled due to the players strike that reduced the season to 9 games; Raiders relocated from Oakland to Los Angeles.
1983	Seahawks 2–0	Seahawks; 38–36	Seahawks; 34–21	Tie; 6–6	Raiders win Super Bowl XVIII.
1983 Playoffs	Raiders 1–0	Raiders; 30–14		Raiders; 7–6	AFC Championship Game.
1984	Tie 1–1	Raiders; 28–14	Seahawks; 17–14	Raiders; 8–7	
1984 Playoffs	Seahawks 1–0		Seahawks; 13–7	Tie; 8–8	AFC Wild Card Game. It was the most recent playoff meeting between the two teams. As Seattle moved to the NFC in 2002, the only way the two teams can now meet in the playoffs is in a Super Bowl.
1985	Tie 1–1	Raiders; 13–3	Seahawks; 33–3	Tie; 9–9	
1986	Tie 1–1	Raiders; 14–10	Seahawks; 37–0	Tie; 10–10	
1987	Tie 1–1	Seahawks; 35–13	Raiders; 37–14	Tie; 11–11	
1988	Seahawks 2–0	Seahawks; 43–37	Seahawks; 35–27	Seahawks; 13–11	
1989	Seahawks 2–0	Seahawks; 24–20	Seahawks; 23–17	Seahawks; 15–11	

1990s (Raiders, 14–6)

Season	Season series	at Los Angeles/Oakland Raiders	at Seattle Seahawks	Overall series	Notes
1990	Raiders 2–0	Raiders; 24–17	Raiders; 17–13	Seahawks; 15–13	
1991	Raiders 2–0	Raiders; 31–7	Raiders; 23–20(OT)	Tie; 15–15	
1992	Raiders 2–0	Raiders; 20–3	Raiders; 19–0	Raiders; 17–15	
1993	Raiders 2–0	Raiders; 27–23	Raiders; 17–13	Raiders; 19–15	Raiders win 8 consecutive games (1990–1993).
1994	Tie 1–1	Seahawks; 38–9	Raiders; 17–16	Raiders; 20–16	
1995	Tie 1–1	Raiders; 17–16	Seahawks; 44–10	Raiders; 21–17	Raiders relocate from Los Angeles back to Oakland.
1996	Tie 1–1	Seahawks; 28–21	Raiders; 27–21	Raiders; 22–18	
1997	Seahawks 2–0	Seahawks; 22–21	Seahawks; 45–34	Raiders; 22–20	
1998	Raiders 2–0	Raiders; 27–23	Raiders; 17–13	Raiders; 24–20	
1999	Tie 1–1	Raiders; 30–21	Seahawks; 22–21	Raiders; 25–21	

2000s (Tie, 3–3)

Season	Results	Location	Overall series	Notes
2000	Raiders; 31–3	Network Associates Coliseum	Raiders; 26–22	
2000	Seahawks; 27–24	Husky Stadium	Raiders; 26–22	Seahawks temporarially relocate to Husky Stadium at the University of Washington during construction of their new stadium.
2001	Raiders; 38–14	Network Associates Coliseum	Raiders; 27–23	
2001	Seahawks; 34–27	Husky Stadium	Raiders; 27–23	
2002	Raiders; 31–17	Network Associates Coliseum	Raiders; 28–23	Raiders lose Super Bowl XXXVII. Seahawks move to the NFC West as a result of NFL realignment. Seahawks open Seahawks Stadium (now known as Lumen Field).
2006	Seahawks; 16–0	Qwest Field	Raiders; 28–24	

2010s (Seahawks, 2–1)

Season	Results	Location	Overall series	Notes
2010	Raiders; 33–3	Oakland Coliseum	Raiders; 29–24	
2014	Seahawks; 30–24	CenturyLink Field	Raiders; 29–25	Seahawks lose Super Bowl XLIX.
2018	Seahawks; 27–3	Wembley Stadium	Raiders; 29–26	Game played in London as part of the NFL International Series, officially a Raiders home game. The last meeting before the Raiders relocated to Las Vegas.

2020s (Tie, 1–1)

Season	Results	Location	Overall series	Notes
2022	Raiders; 40–34 (OT)	Lumen Field	Raiders; 30–26	
2026	Seahawks; 21–13	Allegiant Stadium	Raiders; 30–27	First meeting in Las Vegas.

Summary of results

Season	Season series	at Oak/LA/Las Vegas Raiders	at Seattle Seahawks	Notes
Regular season	Raiders 29–26	Raiders 18–11	Seahawks 15–11	Seahawks 1–0 in London (officially a Raiders home game)
Postseason	Tie 1–1	Raiders 1–0	Seahawks 1–0	AFC Wild Card: 1984; AFC Championship: 1983
Regular and postseason	Raiders 30–27	Raiders 19–11	Seahawks 16–11	
