= Todd Christensen =

American football player (1956–2013)

No. 41, 46
- Position: Tight end

Personal information
- Born: August 3, 1956; Bellefonte, Pennsylvania, U.S.
- Died: November 13, 2013 (aged 57); Murray, Utah, U.S.
- Listed height: 6 ft 3 in (1.91 m)
- Listed weight: 235 lb (107 kg)

Career information
- High school: Sheldon (Eugene, Oregon)
- College: BYU (1974–1977)
- NFL draft: 1978: 2nd round, 56th overall pick

Career history
- Dallas Cowboys (1978); New York Giants (1979); Oakland / Los Angeles Raiders (1979–1988)

Awards and highlights
- 2× Super Bowl champion (XV, XVIII); 3× First-team All-Pro (1983, 1985, 1986); 2× Second-team All-Pro (1984, 1986); 5× Pro Bowl (1983–1987); 2× NFL receptions leader (1983, 1986); First-team All-WAC (1977)

Career NFL statistics
- Receptions: 461
- Receiving yards: 5,872
- Receiving touchdowns: 41
- Stats at Pro Football Reference

Todd Jay Christensen (August 3, 1956 – November 13, 2013) was an American professional football tight end who played in the National Football League (NFL) from 1978 until 1988, primarily with the Oakland / Los Angeles Raiders. He played college football for the BYU Cougars and was selected by the Dallas Cowboys in the second round (56th overall) of the 1978 NFL draft. Following his retirement Christensen became a commentator for both professional and collegiate games, working for NBC Sports, ESPN, and CBS Sports Network among others.

== Early life ==
Christensen was born in Bellefonte, Pennsylvania. His parents were Ned Jay and June Christensen. He was a member of the Church of Jesus Christ of Latter-day Saints. His father was working on a doctoral degree at Pennsylvania State University when Todd was born. When he was five years old, Todd's father was offered a professorship in Eugene, Oregon and the family relocated.

He graduated from Sheldon High School in Eugene in 1974. He was selected in the 1974 Major League Baseball draft, but he elected to play football at Brigham Young University (BYU) in Provo, Utah.

At BYU, Christensen was a four-year starter (1974–1977) for the Cougars at fullback, led the team for three consecutive seasons in receiving and was an All-Western Athletic Conference selection as a senior in 1977. His career numbers while at BYU: 276 rushing attempts for 1,072 yards and 8 touchdowns, 152 receptions for 1,568 yards and 13 touchdowns. He graduated with a degree in social work in 1978 before embarking on his pro career.

== Professional career ==
=== Dallas Cowboys ===
Christensen was selected in the second-round (56th overall) of the 1978 NFL draft by the Dallas Cowboys. While playing fullback and leading the team in rushing, he broke his foot in the final exhibition game, so he was placed on injured reserve and couldn't play a down in a season the team won the conference title and played in Super Bowl XIII. The next year the Cowboys wanted to convert him to tight end, but he didn't agree with the move after working one week in his new position, so he was waived at the end of training camp.

=== New York Giants ===
Christensen was claimed off waivers by the New York Giants but only played in one game and lasted two weeks with the team, before being released to make room for wide receiver Dwight Scales.

=== Oakland/Los Angeles Raiders ===
After being unclaimed, he was signed by the Oakland Raiders in 1979 and became a key player on special teams, which included the role of long snapper. Being the son of a college professor, he was scholarly and enjoyed the mastery of words, he also quoted famous authors and volunteered on different occasions poems, some of which were written by him. His eccentricities helped him fit in with the Raiders, even if he wasn't tailored to the renegade mold.

He finally agreed to play the tight end position and after three seasons of unspectacular statistics (including the Raiders' Super Bowl winning campaign in 1980, in which his only reception of the entire year was a 1-yard touchdown catch in the opening round of the playoffs), Christensen broke out in 1982, catching 42 passes for 510 yards and four touchdowns during the strike-shortened season, helping the Raiders tie the Washington Redskins for the best record in the NFL. The next year, Christensen caught 92 passes for a career-high 1,247 yards and 12 touchdowns and earned the first of his five trips to the Pro Bowl for his efforts. His total catches led the NFL, making him the second tight end to ever do this (Kellen Winslow was the other). The Raiders finished the season with a resounding 38–9 victory over the Washington Redskins in Super Bowl XVIII.

Christensen topped 1,000 yards again in 1984, catching 82 passes in the process. He hit 80 receptions again the following year, missing 1,000 yards by just 13 yards. The 1986 NFL season was Christensen's last big one statistically. He ended the year with a career-high, league-leading 95 receptions for 1,153 yards and eight touchdowns. The 95 receptions would stand as the most by an NFL tight end in a single season until Ben Coates totaled 96 in 1994. Christensen also became the first tight end in history to catch 90 passes in each of two seasons.

Christensen's 1987 campaign was cut short due to the players' strike, but in 12 games he still managed to catch 47 balls (a little fewer than four per game). His 663 yards averaged to 14.1 yards per reception, a career-high in seasons where he caught at least 40 passes. In Christensen's final year, he missed more than half the season with injuries. He only caught 15 passes, with none going for touchdowns, and then he retired from pro football.

In his career, Christensen caught 461 passes for 5,872 yards and 41 touchdowns. In eight postseason games, he caught 31 balls for 358 yards and only one touchdown. He led the league in receptions twice, and his 349 receptions from 1983 through 86 (four seasons) was an NFL record.

In 2017, the Professional Football Researchers Association named Christensen to the PFRA Hall of Very Good Class of 2017.

== NFL career statistics ==
Legend
	Won the Super Bowl
	Led the league
**Bold**	Career high

=== Regular season ===
Year	Team	Games		Receiving				
Year	Team	GP	GS	Rec	Yds	Avg	Lng	TD
1979	NYG	1	0	0	0	0.0	0	0
1979	OAK	12	0	0	0	0.0	0	0
1980	OAK	16	0	0	0	0.0	0	0
1981	OAK	16	0	8	115	**14.4**	30	2
1982	RAI	9	9	42	510	12.1	**50**	4
1983	RAI	16	16	92	**1,247**	13.6	45	**12**
1984	RAI	16	16	80	1,007	12.6	38	7
1985	RAI	16	16	82	987	12.0	48	6
1986	RAI	16	16	**95**	1,153	12.1	35	8
1987	RAI	12	12	47	663	14.1	33	2
1988	RAI	7	5	15	190	12.7	22	0
		137	90	461	5,872	12.7	50	41

=== Playoffs ===
Year	Team	Games		Receiving				
Year	Team	GP	GS	Rec	Yds	Avg	Lng	TD
1980	OAK	4	0	1	1	1.0	1	**1**
1982	RAI	2	2	11	124	11.3	**31**	0
1983	RAI	3	3	**14**	**134**	9.6	21	0
1984	RAI	1	1	1	21	**21.0**	21	0
1985	RAI	1	1	4	78	19.5	**31**	0
		11	7	31	358	11.5	31	1

== After the NFL ==
Following his football career Christensen participated in Masters Track and Field, where he set an age-group world record in the Heptathlon and was the top decathlete in the world for ages 45-and-over. In 1990, during the Major League Baseball lockout, he tried out for the Oakland Athletics. Christensen became a broadcaster, co-hosting the second half of the first season of American Gladiators with Mike Adamle. He later joined the NFL on NBC as a color commentator from 1990 to 1994, teaming up with Charlie Jones for the first four years and, had Greg Gumbel stayed in CBS, he would have teamed up with Drew Goodman instead of Jim Lampley in 1994.

In 1994, Christensen guest-starred on an episode of Married... with Children titled "Kelly Knows Something."

Christensen did color commentary for ESPN's college football coverage before moving to MountainWest Sports Network. Christensen would remain with "the mtn." until the network shut down on May 31, 2012. Christensen was announced as the new analyst for CBS Sports Network Navy games in August 2012. In 2000, he was inducted into the Oregon Sports Hall of Fame.

== Death ==
Christensen died at age 57 on November 13, 2013, from complications during liver transplant surgery at Intermountain Medical Center in Murray, Utah, near his home in Alpine. He had battled liver disease and related illnesses for about two years, though his son, Toby, said his liver issues began with a "botched" gallbladder surgery 25 years earlier.
