= Randall Morris =

American football player (born 1961)

No. 43, 42
- Position: Running back

Personal information
- Born: April 22, 1961 (age 65); Anniston, Alabama, U.S.
- Listed height: 6 ft 0 in (1.83 m)
- Listed weight: 195 lb (88 kg)

Career information
- High school: Long Beach (Long Beach, California)
- College: Tennessee
- NFL draft: 1984: 10th round, 270th overall pick

Career history
- Seattle Seahawks (1984–1988); Detroit Lions (1988); Los Angeles Raiders (1989)*
- * Offseason or practice squad member only

Career NFL statistics
- Rushing yards: 651
- Rushing average: 4.2
- Touchdowns: 1
- Stats at Pro Football Reference

Randall Morris (born April 22, 1961) is an American former professional football player who was a running back who played five seasons in the National Football League (NFL) with the Seattle Seahawks and Detroit Lions. He played college football for the Tennessee Volunteers. He was selected by the Seahawks in the 10th round of the 1984 NFL draft with the 270th overall pick. Morris' brother, Tom, also played in the NFL.
