= John Kaiser (American football) =

American football player (born 1962)

No. 60, 54, 52
- Position: Linebacker

Personal information
- Born: June 6, 1962 (age 64); Oconomowoc, Wisconsin, U.S.
- Listed height: 6 ft 3 in (1.91 m)
- Listed weight: 227 lb (103 kg)

Career information
- High school: Arrowhead (Hartland, Wisconsin)
- College: Arizona
- NFL draft: 1984: 6th round, 162nd overall pick

Career history
- Seattle Seahawks (1984–1986); Buffalo Bills (1987); Winnipeg Blue Bombers (1989)

Career NFL statistics
- Games played: 60
- Games started: 0
- Fumble recoveries: 4
- Stats at Pro Football Reference

John Frederick Kaiser (born June 6, 1962) is an American former professional football player who was a linebacker for four seasons with the Seattle Seahawks and Buffalo Bills of the National Football League (NFL). He played college football for the Arizona Wildcats.
