= Randy Edwards =

American football player (born 1961)

No. 68
- Position: Defensive lineman

Personal information
- Born: March 9, 1961 (age 65); Marietta, Georgia, U.S.
- Listed height: 6 ft 4 in (1.93 m)
- Listed weight: 262 lb (119 kg)

Career information
- College: Alabama
- NFL draft: 1984: undrafted

Career history
- Seattle Seahawks (1984–1987)
- Stats at Pro Football Reference

Randy Edwards is an American former professional football player who was a defensive lineman for four seasons with the Seattle Seahawks of the National Football League (NFL). He played college football for the Alabama Crimson Tide.
