= Keith Simpson (American football) =

American football player (born 1956)

No. 48, 42
- Position: Defensive back

Personal information
- Born: March 9, 1956 (age 70); Memphis, Tennessee, U.S.
- Listed height: 6 ft 1 in (1.85 m)
- Listed weight: 195 lb (88 kg)

Career information
- High school: Hamilton
- College: Memphis State
- NFL draft: 1978: 1st round, 9th overall pick

Career history
- Seattle Seahawks (1978–1985)

Career NFL statistics
- Interceptions: 19
- Sacks: 6
- Stats at Pro Football Reference

Keith Edward Simpson (born March 9, 1956) is an American former professional football player who was a defensive back in the National Football League (NFL). He played his entire eight-season career for the Seattle Seahawks.
