= Greg Gaines (linebacker) =

American football player (born 1958)

No. 56
- Position: Linebacker

Personal information
- Born: October 16, 1958 (age 68); Martinsville, Virginia, U.S.
- Listed height: 6 ft 3 in (1.91 m)
- Listed weight: 220 lb (100 kg)

Career information
- College: Tennessee
- NFL draft: 1981: undrafted

Career history
- Seattle Seahawks (1981–1988)

Career NFL statistics
- Sacks: 11.5
- Interceptions: 2
- Fumble recoveries: 9
- Stats at Pro Football Reference

Gregory Scott Gaines (born October 16, 1958) is an American former professional football player who was a linebacker for eight seasons with the Seattle Seahawks of the National Football League (NFL). He joined the Seahawks as an undrafted free agent prior to the 1981 season. He played college football for the Tennessee Volunteers.
