= Edwin Bailey (American football) =

American football player (born 1959)

No. 65
- Position: Guard

Personal information
- Born: May 15, 1959 (age 67); Savannah, Georgia, U.S.
- Listed height: 6 ft 4 in (1.93 m)
- Listed weight: 271 lb (123 kg)

Career information
- College: South Carolina State
- NFL draft: 1981: 5th round, 114th overall pick

Career history
- Seattle Seahawks (1981–1991)

Awards and highlights
- Seattle Seahawks Top 50 players

Career NFL statistics
- Games played: 139
- Games started: 120
- Fumble recoveries: 7
- Stats at Pro Football Reference

Edwin Raymond Bailey (born May 15, 1959) is an American former professional football player who was a guard in the National Football League (NFL). Bailey attended South Carolina State University and eventually earned his degree at Charter Oak State College. He was the New York/New Jersey Hitmen of the XFL's offensive line coach.
