= Terry Taylor (American football) =

American football player (born 1961)

No. 20, 21, 24
- Position: Cornerback

Personal information
- Born: July 18, 1961 (age 65); Warren, Ohio, U.S.
- Listed height: 5 ft 10 in (1.78 m)
- Listed weight: 191 lb (87 kg)

Career information
- High school: Rayen (Youngstown, Ohio)
- College: Southern Illinois
- NFL draft: 1984: 1st round, 22nd overall pick

Career history
- Seattle Seahawks (1984–1988); Detroit Lions (1989–1991); Cleveland Browns (1992–1993); Los Angeles Rams (1994)*; Seattle Seahawks (1994); Atlanta Falcons (1995)
- * Offseason or practice squad member only

Career NFL statistics
- Interceptions: 25
- Fumble recoveries: 5
- Touchdowns: 2
- Stats at Pro Football Reference

Terry Lee Taylor (born July 18, 1961) is an American former professional football player who was a cornerback in the National Football League (NFL). He was selected by the Seattle Seahawks in the first round of the 1984 NFL draft.

Standing 5'10" and 188 lbs. from Southern Illinois University, Taylor played in 12 NFL seasons from 1984 to 1995 for the Seattle Seahawks, the Detroit Lions, the Cleveland Browns and the Atlanta Falcons. He also coached one season of high school football at Kennedy Catholic High School in Hermitage, Pennsylvania. He worked under head coach John Turco as the defensive backs and wide receivers coach.
