= Eric Lane (running back, born 1959) =

American football player (born 1959)

No. 37
- Position: Running back

Personal information
- Born: January 6, 1959 (age 67); Oakland, California, U.S.
- Listed height: 6 ft 0 in (1.83 m)
- Listed weight: 195 lb (88 kg)

Career information
- High school: Hayward (CA)
- College: Brigham Young
- NFL draft: 1981: 8th round, 196th overall pick

Career history
- Seattle Seahawks (1981–1987)

Career NFL statistics
- Rushing yards: 405
- Rushing average: 3.3
- Receptions: 42
- Receiving yards: 357
- Total touchdowns: 7
- Stats at Pro Football Reference

Eric T. Lane (born January 6, 1959) is an American former professional football player who was a running back for seven seasons with the Seattle Seahawks of the National Football League (NFL) from 1981 to 1987. He was drafted by the Seahawks in the eighth round (196th overall) of the 1981 NFL Draft.
