= Byron Walker =

American football player (born 1960)

No. 89
- Position: Wide receiver

Personal information
- Born: July 28, 1960 (age 66); Scott Air Force Base, Illinois, U.S.
- Listed height: 6 ft 4 in (1.93 m)
- Listed weight: 190 lb (86 kg)

Career information
- High school: Warner Robins (GA)
- College: The Citadel
- NFL draft: 1982: undrafted

Career history
- Seattle Seahawks (1982–1986)

Career NFL statistics
- Receptions: 54
- Receiving yards: 925
- Touchdowns: 7
- Stats at Pro Football Reference

Byron Burneil "Bones" Walker (born July 28, 1960) is an American former professional football player who was a wide receiver for the Seattle Seahawks of the National Football League (NFL). A free agent signee he was a member of the team from 1982 to 1986 making 54 receptions for 925 yards and 7 touchdowns. A native of Warner Robins, Georgia he lettered four years playing college football for The Citadel Bulldogs, finishing with career marks of 101 receptions for 1,486 yards and nine touchdowns, which still rank him in the top five in all three categories.
