= 1986 Kansas City Chiefs season =

NFL team season

- Owner: Lamar Hunt
- General manager: Jim Schaaf
- Head coach: John Mackovic
- Defensive coordinator: Walt Corey
- Home stadium: Arrowhead Stadium

Results
- Record: 10–6
- Division place: 2nd AFC West
- Playoffs: Lost Wild Card Playoffs (at Jets) 15–35
- All-Pros: 2: DT Bill Maas (2nd team); S Deron Cherry (1st team)
- Pro Bowlers: 3: DT Bill Maas; S Lloyd Burruss; S Deron Cherry

The 1986 Kansas City Chiefs season marked the franchise's 17th season in the National Football League and the 27th overall. The season concluded with a 10–6 record, representing the team's best performance since 1971. This successful run earned The Chiefs a wild card playoff berth, their first playoff appearance since the aforementioned 1971 season and only their second since the AFL-NFL merger, although their postseason journey was cut short by a 35-15 loss to the New York Jets.

Former linebacker Willie Lanier was enshrined in the Pro Football Hall of Fame on August 2. On the field, the pieces started coming together for head coach John Mackovic. His offense displayed plenty of scoring punch, while the club's defense and special teams became increasingly effective. With the team sitting at 3–3, Bill Kenney replaced Todd Blackledge for the second half of the season in a game against San Diego, guiding the club to a 42–41 victory. That win was the first of four consecutive triumphs with Kenney at the helm, the club's longest winning streak since 1980. Poised with a 7–3 record after 10 games, three straight losses in November put the Chiefs playoff chances in jeopardy. Two December wins gave Kansas City a 9–6 mark, putting the Chiefs on the verge of their first postseason berth in 15 years.

The defining moment of the season came in the regular season finale at Pittsburgh on December 21. Despite being outgained in total yardage by a 515–171 margin, the Chiefs were able to notch a 24–19 victory as all of the team's points came via special teams on a blocked punt return, a field goal, a kickoff return and a blocked field goal return. With a 10–6 record the Chiefs earned an AFC Wild Card berth, winning a tiebreaker with Seattle. Kenney was injured in the fourth quarter of the Steelers contest, meaning Blackledge drew the starting assignment for the club's first playoff contest since 1971, a 35–15 loss vs the New York Jets. Despite making the playoffs, Mackovic was fired after the season, allegedly due to a lack of chemistry with his players, according to owner Lamar Hunt. He was replaced by special teams coordinator Frank Gansz. The Chiefs would not make the playoffs again until 1990.

== Offseason ==
=== NFL draft ===
1986 Kansas City Chiefs draft
Round	Selection	Player	Position	College
1	7	Brian Jozwiak	Guard	West Virginia
2	35	Dino Hackett	Linebacker	Appalachian State
3	63	Leonard Griffin	Defensive end	Grambling State
4	87	Tom Baugh	Center	Southern Illinois
4	90	Chas Fox	Wide receiver	Furman
6	141	Kent Hagood	Running back	South Carolina
8	196	Lewis Colbert	Punter	Auburn
9	229	Gary Baldinger	Defensive end	Wake Forest
10	257	Ike Readon	Nose tackle	Hampton
11	285	Aaron Pearson	Linebacker	Mississippi State

=== Undrafted free agents ===
1986 undrafted free agents of note
Player	Position	College
John Addison	Tight end	William Jewell

== Personnel ==
=== Staff / Coaches ===
1986 Kansas City Chiefs staff
Front office: Founder/Owner – Lamar Hunt; President – Jack Steadman; Vice-president and general manager – Jim Schaaf; Director of player personnel – Les Miller; Coordinator of pro scouting – Greg Mohns; Head coaches: Head coach – John Mackovic; Assistant head coach – Frank Gansz; Offensive coaches: Quarterbacks – Pete McCulley; Offensive backs – Willie Peete; Wide receivers – Richard Williamson; Offensive line – Carl Mauck; Offensive assistant – JD Helm	Defensive coaches: Defensive coordinator/linebackers – Walt Corey; Defensive line – John Paul Young; Defensive backs – Doug Graber; Defensive quality control – Dave Brazil; Special teams coaches: Special teams – Frank Gansz; Strength and conditioning: Strength and conditioning – CT Hewgley

=== Roster ===
1986 Kansas City Chiefs roster
Quarterbacks (QB): 14 Todd Blackledge; 9 Bill Kenney; 10 Frank Seurer; Running backs (RB): 40 Boyce Green; 44 Herman Heard; 32 Larry Moriarty; 43 Mike Pruitt; 42 Jeff Smith; Wide receivers (WR): 86 Emile Harry; 89 Henry Marshall; 83 Stephone Paige; Tight ends (TE): 87 Walt Arnold; 84 Paul Coffman; 85 Jonathan Hayes	Offensive linemen (OL): 61 Mark Adickes G; 76 John Alt T; 77 Rich Baldinger T; 58 Tom Baugh C; 71 Brad Budde G; 51 Rick Donnalley C; 75 Irv Eatman T; 73 Brian Jozwiak G; 72 Dave Lutz T; Defensive linemen (DL): 98 Leonard Griffin DE; 93 Eric Holle NT; 74 Pete Koch DE; 70 Kit Lathrop DE; 63 Bill Maas NT; 67 Art Still DE	Linebackers (LB): 54 Tim Cofield OLB; 55 Louis Cooper OLB; 56 Dino Hackett ILB; 53 Whitney Paul OLB; 96 Aaron Pearson ILB; 97 Scott Radecic ILB; 59 Gary Spani ILB; Defensive backs (DB): 34 Lloyd Burruss SS; 20 Deron Cherry FS; 29 Albert Lewis CB; 24 J. C. Pearson CB; 30 Mark Robinson SS; 31 Kevin Ross CB; 22 Sherman Cocroft FS; Special teams (ST): 5 Lewis Colbert P; 8 Nick Lowery K	Reserve: 99 Mike Bell DE (LOA); -- Paul Bergmann TE (IR); 88 Carlos Carson WR (IR); 25 Jack Epps S (IR); 48 Andre Garron RB (IR); 90 Bob Hamm DE (IR); 82 Anthony Hancock WR (IR); 23 Greg Hill CB (IR); 94 Ken McAlister LB (IR); 47 Chris Smith RB (IR); Rookies in italics

== Preseason ==
Week	Date	Opponent	Result	Record	Venue	Attendance	Recap
1	August 9	Cincinnati Bengals	W 20–0	1–0	Arrowhead Stadium	30,067	Recap
2	August 16	at St. Louis Cardinals	W 27–26	2–0	Busch Stadium	30,305	Recap
3	August 23	Buffalo Bills	L 6–13	2–1	Arrowhead Stadium	39,911	Recap
4	August 30	at New Orleans Saints	L 10–13	2–2	Louisiana Superdome	47,945	Recap

== Regular season ==
=== Schedule ===
Week	Date	Opponent	Result	Record	Venue	Attendance	Recap
1	September 7	Cincinnati Bengals	**W** 24–14	1–0	Arrowhead Stadium	43,430	Recap
2	September 14	at **Seattle Seahawks**	**L** 17–23	1–1	Kingdome	61,068	Recap
3	September 21	Houston Oilers	**W** 27–13	2–1	Arrowhead Stadium	43,699	Recap
4	September 28	at Buffalo Bills	**W** 20–17	3–1	Rich Stadium	67,555	Recap
5	October 5	**Los Angeles Raiders**	**L** 17–24	3–2	Arrowhead Stadium	74,430	Recap
6	October 12	at Cleveland Browns	**L** 7–20	3–3	Cleveland Stadium	71,278	Recap
7	October 19	**San Diego Chargers**	**W** 42–41	4–3	Arrowhead Stadium	55,767	Recap
8	October 26	Tampa Bay Buccaneers	**W** 27–20	5–3	Arrowhead Stadium	36,230	Recap
9	November 2	at **San Diego Chargers**	**W** 24–23	6–3	Jack Murphy Stadium	48,518	Recap
10	November 9	**Seattle Seahawks**	**W** 27–7	7–3	Arrowhead Stadium	53,268	Recap
11	November 16	at **Denver Broncos**	**L** 17–38	7–4	Mile High Stadium	75,745	Recap
12	November 23	at St. Louis Cardinals	**L** 14–23	7–5	Busch Stadium	29,680	Recap
13	November 30	Buffalo Bills	**L** 14–17	7–6	Arrowhead Stadium	31,492	Recap
14	December 7	**Denver Broncos**	**W** 37–10	8–6	Arrowhead Stadium	47,019	Recap
15	December 14	at **Los Angeles Raiders**	**W** 20–17	9–6	Los Angeles Memorial Coliseum	60,952	Recap
16	December 21	at Pittsburgh Steelers	**W** 24–19	10–6	Three Rivers Stadium	47,150	Recap
Note: Intra-division opponents are in **bold** text.

=== Game summaries ===
==== Week 1: vs. Cincinnati Bengals ====
Week 1: Cincinnati Bengals at Kansas City Chiefs – Game summary

Quarter	1	2	3	4	Total
Bengals	0	7	0	7	**14**
**Chiefs**	7	0	14	3	**24**

at Arrowhead Stadium, Kansas City, Missouri

- Date: September 7
- Game time: 3:00 p.m. CDT
- Game weather: 56 °F (13 °C)
- Game attendance: 43,430
- Referee: Chuck Heberling
- TV announcers (NBC): Len Berman and John Hannah
- Recap

Game information

**First quarter**

- KC – Deron Cherry blocked punt recovery in endzone (Nick Lowery kick), 13:18. Chiefs 7–0.

**Second quarter**

- CIN – Cris Collinsworth 15-yard pass from Boomer Esiason (Jim Breech kick), 10:53. Tied 7–7.

**Third quarter**

- KC – Jeff Smith 15-yard pass Todd Blackledge (Nick Lowery kick), 11:30. Chiefs 14–7.
- KC – Walt Arnold fumble recovery in endzone (Nick Lowery kick), 0:29. Chiefs 21–7.

**Fourth quarter**

- CIN – Cris Collinsworth 28-yard pass from Boomer Esiason (Jim Breech kick), 7:50. Chiefs 21–14.
- KC – Nick Lowery 18-yard field goal, 1:32. Chiefs 24–14.

**Top passers**

- CIN – Boomer Esiason – 22/43, 263 yards, 2 TD, INT
- KC – Todd Blackledge – 13/28, 190 yards, TD, INT

**Top rushers**

- CIN – James Brooks – 13 rushes, 40 yards
- KC – Herman Heard – 10 rushes, 62 yards

**Top receivers**

- CIN – Cris Collinsworth – 6 receptions, 75 yards, 2 TD
- KC – Stephone Paige – 5 receptions, 93 yards

==== Week 2: at Seattle Seahawks ====
Week 2: Kansas City Chiefs at Seattle Seahawks – Game summary

Quarter	1	2	3	4	Total
Chiefs	3	0	7	7	**17**
**Seahawks**	0	13	10	0	**23**

at Kingdome, Seattle, Washington

- Date: September 14
- Game time: 3:00 p.m. CDT/1:00 p.m. PDT
- Game weather: None (indoor stadium)
- Game attendance: 61,068
- Referee: Dick Hantak
- TV announcers (NBC): Jay Randolph and Jimmy Cefalo
- Recap, Game Book

Game information

**First quarter**

- KC – Nick Lowery 42-yard field goal, 10:31. Chiefs 3–0. **Drive: 10 plays, 48 yards, 4:20.**

**Second quarter**

- SEA – Norm Johnson 35-yard field goal, 14:57. Tied 3–3. **Drive: 10 plays, 46 yards, 4:37.**
- SEA – Norm Johnson 34-yard field goal, 11:51. Seahawks 6–3. **Drive: 7 plays, 18 yards, 1:52.**
- SEA – Daryl Turner 6-yard pass from Dave Krieg (Norm Johnson kick), 2:56. Seahawks 13–3. **Drive: 9 plays, 47 yards, 5:25.**

**Third quarter**

- KC – Carlos Carson 70-yard pass from Todd Blackledge (Nick Lowery kick), 9:23. Seahawks 13–10. **Drive: 4 plays, 80 yards, 1:25.**
- SEA – Norm Johnson 53-yard field goal, 6:34. Seahawks 16–10. **Drive: 9 plays, 37 yards, 2:41.**
- SEA – Curt Warner 1-yard run (Norm Johnson kick), 3:47. Seahawks 23–10. **Drive: 2 plays, 5 yards, 0:48.**

**Fourth quarter**

- KC – Jeff Smith 1-yard run (Nick Lowery kick), 0:04. Seahawks 23–17. **Drive: 12 plays, 66 yards, 2:44.**

**Top passers**

- KC – Todd Blackledge – 15/29, 183 yards, TD, 2 INT
- SEA – Dave Krieg – 21/35, 203 yards, TD, INT

**Top rushers**

- KC – Mike Pruitt – 6 rushes, 28 yards
- SEA – Curt Warner – 25 rushes, 80 yards, TD

**Top receivers**

- KC – Carlos Carson – 2 receptions, 80 yards, TD
- SEA – Steve Largent – 5 receptions, 62 yards

==== Week 3: vs. Houston Oilers ====
Week 3: Houston Oilers at Kansas City Chiefs – Game summary

Quarter	1	2	3	4	Total
Oilers	0	0	7	6	**13**
**Chiefs**	3	10	14	0	**27**

at Arrowhead Stadium, Kansas City, Missouri

- Date: September 21
- Game time: 12:00 p.m. CDT
- Game weather: Mostly Sunny, 87 °F (31 °C)
- Game attendance: 43,699
- Referee: Gene Barth
- TV announcers (NBC): Charlie Jones and Jimmy Cefalo
- Recap, Game Book

Game information

**First quarter**

- KC – Nick Lowery 47-yard field goal, 11:11. Chiefs 3–0. **Drive: 7 plays, 56 yards, 3:49.**

**Second quarter**

- KC – Carlos Carson 29-yard pass from Todd Blackledge (Nick Lowery kick), 14:03. Chiefs 10–0. **Drive: 5 plays, 80 yards, 1:48.**
- KC – Nick Lowery 45-yard field goal, 0:00. Chiefs 13–0. **Drive: 3 plays, 29 yards, 0:24.**

**Third quarter**

- KC – Herman Heard 11-yard run (Nick Lowery kick), 11:54. Chiefs 20–0. **Drive: 4 plays, 27 yards, 1:41.**
- KC – Greg Hill 26-yard interception return (Nick Lowery kick), 10:47. Chiefs 27–0.
- HOU – Jeff Donaldson fumble recovery in endzone (Tony Zendejas kick), 2:33. Chiefs 27–7.

**Fourth quarter**

- HOU – Warren Moon 1-yard run (kick blocked), 13:36. Chiefs 27–13. **Drive: 6 plays, 46 yards, 2:24.**

**Top passers**

- HOU – Warren Moon – 18/40, 229 yards, 2 INT
- KC – Todd Blackledge – 6/23, 160 yards, TD

**Top rushers**

- HOU – Chuck Banks – 10 rushes, 43 yards
- KC – Herman Heard – 8 rushes, 43 yards, TD

**Top receivers**

- HOU – Ernest Givins – 4 receptions, 76 yards
- KC – Carlos Carson – 3 receptions, 98 yards, TD

==== Week 4: at Buffalo Bills ====
Week 4: Kansas City Chiefs at Buffalo Bills – Game summary

Quarter	1	2	3	4	Total
**Chiefs**	3	7	0	10	**20**
Bills	7	0	7	3	**17**

at Rich Stadium, Orchard Park, New York

- Date: September 28
- Game time: 1:00 p.m. EDT/12:00 p.m. CDT
- Game weather: Sunny, 72 °F (22 °C)
- Game attendance: 67,555
- Referee: Jerry Seeman
- TV announcers (NBC): Tom Davis and Dave Rowe
- Recap, Game Book

Game information

**First quarter**

- BUF – Robb Riddick 41-yard run (Scott Norwood kick), 11:07. Bills 7–0. **Drive: 11 plays, 80 yards, 3:51.**
- KC – Nick Lowery 24-yard field goal, 4:03. Bills 7–3. **Drive: 13 plays, 75 yards, 6:55.**

**Second quarter**

- KC – Stephone Paige 26-yard pass from Todd Blackledge (Nick Lowery kick), 1:23. Chiefs 10–7. **Drive: 5 plays, 53 yards, 2:15.**

**Third quarter**

- BUF – Ronnie Harmon 14-yard pass from Jim Kelly (Scott Norwood kick), 7:09. Bills 14–10. **Drive: 9 plays, 80 yards, 3:23.**

**Fourth quarter**

- BUF – Scott Norwood 32-yard field goal, 11:39. Bills 17–10. **Drive: 13 plays, 68 yards, 8:05.**
- KC – Paul Coffman 1-yard pass from Todd Blackledge (Nick Lowery kick), 4:18. Tied 17–17. **Drive: 13 plays, 72 yards, 8:13.**
- KC – Nick Lowery 46-yard field goal, 1:07. Chiefs 20–17. **Drive: 6 plays, 17 yards, 2:51.**

**Top passers**

- KC – Todd Blackledge – 17/27, 210 yards, 2 TD
- BUF – Jim Kelly – 24/38, 291 yards, TD, 3 INT

**Top rushers**

- KC – Boyce Green – 9 rushes, 52 yards
- BUF – Robb Riddick – 13 rushes, 79 yards, TD

**Top receivers**

- KC – Stephone Paige – 3 receptions, 85 yards, TD
- BUF – Robb Riddick – 5 receptions, 67 yards

==== Week 5: vs. Los Angeles Raiders ====
Week 5: Los Angeles Raiders at Kansas City Chiefs – Game summary

Quarter	1	2	3	4	Total
**Raiders**	0	7	14	3	**24**
Chiefs	10	7	0	0	**17**

at Arrowhead Stadium, Kansas City, Missouri

- Date: October 5
- Game time: 12:00 p.m. CDT
- Game weather: Partly Sunny, 60 °F (16 °C)
- Game attendance: 74,430
- Referee: Bob Frederic
- TV announcers (NBC): Don Criqui and Bob Trumpy
- Recap, Game Book

Game information

**First quarter**

- KC – Nick Lowery 24-yard field goal, 9:42. Chiefs 3–0. **Drive: 7 plays, 6 yards, 2:56.**
- KC – Boyce Green 18-yard run (Nick Lowery kick), 5:56. Chiefs 10–0. **Drive: 4 plays, 34 yards, 1:37.**

**Second quarter**

- KC – Paul Coffman 1-yard pass from Todd Blackledge (Nick Lowery kick), 12:27. Chiefs 17–0. **Drive: 10 plays, 66 yards, 5:37.**
- RAI – Dokie Williams 12-yard pass from Marc Wilson (Chris Bahr kick), 4:20. Chiefs 17–7. **Drive: 6 plays, 37 yards, 2:40.**

**Third quarter**

- RAI – Napoleon McCallum 12-yard run (Chris Bahr kick), 10:18. Chiefs 17–14. **Drive: 5 plays, 43 yards, 2:27.**
- RAI – Jessie Hester 18-yard pass from Jim Plunkett (Chris Bahr kick), 5:43. Raiders 21–17. **Drive: 5 plays, 46 yards, 1:52.**

**Fourth quarter**

- RAI – Chris Bahr 19-yard field goal, 2:55. Raiders 24–17. **Drive: 11 plays, 62 yards, 5:36.**

**Top passers**

- RAI – Jim Plunkett – 8/10, 108 yards, TD
- KC – Todd Blackledge – 9/21, 77 yards, TD, INT

**Top rushers**

- RAI – Napoleon McCallum – 19 rushes, 69 yards, TD
- KC – Boyce Green – 8 rushes, 39 yards, TD

**Top receivers**

- RAI – Dokie Williams – 6 receptions, 90 yards, TD
- KC – Jeff Smith – 5 receptions, 51 yards

==== Week 6: at Cleveland Browns ====
Week 6: Kansas City Chiefs at Cleveland Browns – Game summary

Quarter	1	2	3	4	Total
Chiefs	0	7	0	0	**7**
**Browns**	0	7	10	3	**20**

at Cleveland Municipal Stadium, Cleveland, Ohio

- Date: October 12
- Game time: 1:00 p.m. EST/12:00 p.m. CST
- Game weather: Sunshine, 66 °F (19 °C)
- Game attendance: 71,278
- Referee: Bob McElwee
- TV announcers (NBC): Gary Gerould and Butch Johnson
- Recap, Game Book

Game information

**First quarter**

- No scoring plays.

**Second quarter**

- KC – Stephone Paige 26-yard pass from Todd Blackledge (Nick Lowery kick), 14:54. Chiefs 7–0. **Drive: 12 plays, 80 yards, 4:58.**
- CLE – Earnest Byner 16-yard pass from Bernie Kosar (Matt Bahr kick), 9:52. Tied 7–7. **Drive: 10 plays, 65 yards, 5:02.**

**Third quarter**

- CLE – Ozzie Newsome 6-yard pass from Bernie Kosar (Matt Bahr kick), 10:08. Browns 14–7. **Drive: 3 plays, 52 yards, 2:56.**
- CLE – Matt Bahr 34-yard field goal, 6:39. Browns 17–7. **Drive: 4 plays, 6 yards, 1:41.**

**Fourth quarter**

- CLE – Matt Bahr 36-yard field goal, 12:33. Browns 20–7. **Drive: 9 plays, 63 yards, 4:39.**

**Top passers**

- KC – Todd Blackledge – 11/26, 109 yards, TD, INT
- CLE – Bernie Kosar – 22/35, 287 yards, 2 TD, INT

**Top rushers**

- KC – Mike Pruitt – 9 rushes, 20 yards
- CLE – Earnest Byner – 19 rushes, 35 yards

**Top receivers**

- KC – Stephone Paige – 2 receptions, 34 yards, TD
- CLE – Reggie Langhorne – 3 receptions, 59 yards

==== Week 7: vs. San Diego Chargers ====
Week 7: San Diego Chargers at Kansas City Chiefs – Game summary

Quarter	1	2	3	4	Total
Chargers	7	17	7	10	**41**
**Chiefs**	7	21	7	7	**42**

at Arrowhead Stadium, Kansas City, Missouri

- Date: October 19
- Game time: 3:00 p.m. CDT
- Game weather: Sunny, 75 °F (24 °C)
- Game attendance: 55,767
- Referee: Dick Jorgensen
- TV announcers (NBC): Charlie Jones and Jimmy Cefalo
- Recap, Game Book

Game information

**First quarter**

- KC – Stephone Paige 45-yard pass from Todd Blackledge (Nick Lowery kick), 9:38. Chiefs 7–0. **Drive: 1 play, 45 yards, 0:06.**
- SD – Gary Anderson 7-yard pass from Dan Fouts (Rolf Benirschke kick), 3:41. Tied 7–7. **Drive: 13 plays, 75 yards, 5:47.**

**Second quarter**

- KC – Lloyd Burruss 56-yard interception return (Nick Lowery kick), 9:53. Chiefs 14–7.
- KC – Kevin Ross 21-yard fumble return (Nick Lowery kick), 9:41. Chiefs 21–7.
- SD – Buford McGee 1-yard run (Rolf Benirschke kick), 4:41. Chiefs 21–14. **Drive: 9 plays, 75 yards, 4:51.**
- KC – Lloyd Burruss 47-yard interception return (Nick Lowery kick), 2:42. Chiefs 28–14.
- SD – Rolf Benirschke 30-yard field goal, 1:06. Chiefs 28–17. **Drive: 8 plays, 35 yards, 1:27.**
- SD – Leslie O'Neal 5-yard interception return (Rolf Benirschke kick), 0:56. Chiefs 28–24.

**Third quarter**

- KC – Stephone Paige 16-yard pass from Bill Kenney (Nick Lowery kick), 12:57. Chiefs 35–24. **Drive: 2 plays, 20 yards, 0:44.**
- SD – Gary Anderson 2-yard run (Rolf Benirschke kick), 6:46. Chiefs 35–31. **Drive: 12 plays, 80 yards, 6:04.**

**Fourth quarter**

- SD – Rolf Benirschke 21-yard field goal, 14:06. Chiefs 35–34. **Drive: 13 plays, 76 yards, 5:48.**
- KC – Boyce Green 1-yard run (Nick Lowery kick), 10:18. Chiefs 42–34. **Drive: 7 plays, 80 yards, 3:43.**
- SD – Gary Anderson 12-yard pass from Mark Herrmann (Rolf Benirschke kick), 3:42. Chiefs 42–41. **Drive: 5 plays, 34 yards, 0:58.**

**Top passers**

- SD – Dan Fouts – 19/33, 200 yards, TD, 3 INT
- KC – Bill Kenney – 6/9, 97 yards, TD

**Top rushers**

- SD – Tim Spencer – 10 rushes, 57 yards
- KC – Mike Pruitt – 10 rushes, 35 yards

**Top receivers**

- SD – Gary Anderson – 11 receptions, 92 yards, 2 TD
- KC – Stephone Paige – 3 receptions, 66 yards, 2 TD

==== Week 8: vs. Tampa Bay Buccaneers ====
Week 8: Tampa Bay Buccaneers at Kansas City Chiefs – Game summary

Quarter	1	2	3	4	Total
Buccaneers	3	10	0	7	**20**
**Chiefs**	7	3	10	7	**27**

at Arrowhead Stadium, Kansas City, Missouri

- Date: October 26
- Game time: 12:00 p.m. CST
- Game weather: Overcast, 53 °F (12 °C)
- Game attendance: 36,230
- Referee: Ben Dreith
- TV announcers (CBS): Tim Ryan and Terry Bradshaw
- Recap, Game Book

Game information

**First quarter**

- TB – Donald Igwebuike 49-yard field goal, 10:43. Buccaneers 3–0. **Drive: 8 plays, 48 yards, 4:18.**
- KC – Mike Pruitt 1-yard run (Nick Lowery kick), 3:52. Chiefs 7–3. **Drive: 10 plays, 80 yards, 6:42.**

**Second quarter**

- TB – Calvin Magee 10-yard pass from Steve Young (Donald Igwebuike kick), 7:55. Buccaneers 10–7. **Drive: 2 plays, 11 yards, 0:11.**
- TB – Donald Igwebuike 39-yard field goal, 5:07. Buccaneers 13–7. **Drive: 4 plays, –4 yards, 1:18.**
- KC – Nick Lowery 26-yard field goal, 0:05. Buccaneers 13–10. **Drive: 13 plays, 71 yards, 4:58.**

**Third quarter**

- KC – Nick Lowery 20-yard field goal, 10:59. Tied 13–13. **Drive: 8 plays, 74 yards, 4:01.**
- KC – Stephone Paige 3-yard pass from Bill Kenney (Nick Lowery kick), 5:55. Chiefs 20–13. **Drive: 7 plays, 15 yards, 3:44.**

**Fourth quarter**

- TB – James Wilder 3-yard run (Donald Igwebuike kick), 12:52. Tied 20–20. **Drive: 13 plays, 80 yards, 6:06.**
- KC – Jeff Smith 32-yard run (Nick Lowery kick), 10:35. Chiefs 27–20. **Drive: 4 plays, 67 yards, 2:09.**

**Top passers**

- TB – Steve Young – 11/20, 124 yards, TD, INT
- KC – Bill Kenney – 15/29, 230 yards, TD, INT

**Top rushers**

- TB – James Wilder – 25 rushes, 110 yards, TD
- KC – Jeff Smith – 3 rushes, 42 yards, TD

**Top receivers**

- TB – Jerry Bell – 5 receptions, 61 yards
- KC – Henry Marshall – 5 receptions, 91 yards

==== Week 9: at San Diego Chargers ====
Week 9: Kansas City Chiefs at San Diego Chargers – Game summary

Quarter	1	2	3	4	Total
**Chiefs**	0	0	7	17	**24**
Chargers	2	14	0	7	**23**

at Jack Murphy Stadium, San Diego, California

- Date: November 2
- Game time: 3:00 p.m. CST/1:00 p.m. PST
- Game weather: Sunny and Clear, 78 °F (26 °C)
- Game attendance: 48,518
- Referee: Fred Wyant
- TV announcers (NBC): Fred Roggin and Dave Rowe
- Recap, Game Book

Game information

**First quarter**

- SD – Rick Donnalley fumble out of bounds in end zone for a Safety, 12:11. Chargers 2–0.

**Second quarter**

- SD – Wes Chandler 7-yard pass from Tom Flick (Rolf Benirschke kick), 13:31. Chargers 9–0. **Drive: 6 plays, 16 yards, 3:34.**
- SD – Tim Spencer 4-yard run (Rolf Benirschke kick), 10:42. Chargers 16–0. **Drive: 6 plays, 30 yards, 2:24.**

**Third quarter**

- KC – Jeff Smith 1-yard pass from Bill Kenney (Nick Lowery kick), 4:08. Chargers 16–7. **Drive: 10 plays, 30 yards, 4:26.**

**Fourth quarter**

- KC – Emile Harry 5-yard pass from Bill Kenney (Nick Lowery kick), 7:43. Chargers 16–14. **Drive: 6 plays, 30 yards, 2:01.**
- KC – Mike Pruitt 1-yard run (Nick Lowery kick), 1:46. Chiefs 21–16. **Drive: 7 plays, 67 yards, 1:52.**
- SD – Tom Flick 1-yard run (Rolf Benirschke kick), 1:02. Chargers 23–21. **Drive: 6 plays, 37 yards, 0:33.**
- KC – Nick Lowery 37-yard field goal, 0:07. Chiefs 24–23. **Drive: 6 plays, 50 yards, 0:50.**

**Top passers**

- KC – Bill Kenney – 21/32, 287 yards, 2 TD
- SD – Tom Flick – 4/17, 42 yards, TD, 4 INT

**Top rushers**

- KC – Jeff Smith – 10 rushes, 41 yards
- SD – Gary Anderson – 25 rushes, 100 yards

**Top receivers**

- KC – Henry Marshall – 7 receptions, 90 yards
- SD – Wes Chandler – 3 receptions, 40 yards, TD

==== Week 10: vs. Seattle Seahawks ====
Week 10: Seattle Seahawks at Kansas City Chiefs – Game summary

Quarter	1	2	3	4	Total
Seahawks	0	0	0	7	**7**
**Chiefs**	0	17	7	3	**27**

at Arrowhead Stadium, Kansas City, Missouri

- Date: November 9
- Game time: 12:00 p.m. CST
- Game weather: Clear, 40 °F (4 °C)
- Game attendance: 53,268
- Referee: Jerry Markbreit
- TV announcers (NBC): Len Berman and Dave Rowe
- Recap, Game Book

Game information

**First quarter**

- No scoring plays.

**Second quarter**

- KC – Walt Arnold 2-yard pass from Bill Kenney (Nick Lowery kick), 13:40. Chiefs 7–0. **Drive: 13 plays, 62 yards, 4:50.**
- KC – Nick Lowery 35-yard field goal, 5:51. Chiefs 10–0. **Drive: 11 plays, 51 yards, 6:11.**
- KC – Stephone Paige 8-yard pass from Bill Kenney (Nick Lowery kick), 1:00. Chiefs 17–0. **Drive: 9 plays, 72 yards, 3:01.**

**Third quarter**

- KC – Carlos Carson 25-yard pass from Bill Kenney (Nick Lowery kick), 9:54. Chiefs 24–0. **Drive: 6 plays, 63 yards, 2:56.**

**Fourth quarter**

- KC – Nick Lowery 37-yard field goal, 12:12. Chiefs 27–0. **Drive: 8 plays, 19 yards, 3:12.**
- SEA – Steve Largent 38-yard pass from Gale Gilbert (Norm Johnson kick), 7:17. Chiefs 27–7. **Drive: 9 plays, 68 yards, 4:46.**

**Top passers**

- SEA – Gale Gilbert – 13/26, 140 yards, TD
- KC – Bill Kenney – 22/41, 256 yards, 3 TD, 3 INT

**Top rushers**

- SEA – Curt Warner – 11 rushes, 16 yards
- KC – Larry Moriarty – 11 rushes, 43 yards

**Top receivers**

- SEA – Steve Largent – 4 receptions, 72 yards, TD
- KC – Stephone Paige – 5 receptions, 60 yards, TD

==== Week 11: at Denver Broncos ====
Week 11: Kansas City Chiefs at Denver Broncos – Game summary

Quarter	1	2	3	4	Total
Chiefs	0	7	10	0	**17**
**Broncos**	21	10	7	0	**38**

at Mile High Stadium, Denver, Colorado

- Date: November 16
- Game time: 3:00 p.m. CST/2:00 p.m. MST
- Game weather: Sunny, 62 °F (17 °C)
- Game attendance: 75,745
- Referee: Jim Tunney
- TV announcers (NBC): Charlie Jones and Jimmy Cefalo
- Recap, Game Book

Game information

**First quarter**

- DEN – Steve Wilson 43-yard pass from Chris Norman (Rich Karlis kick), 10:55. Broncos 7–0. **Drive: 7 plays, 50 yards, 2:57.**
- DEN – Andre Townsend 7-yard fumble return (Rich Karlis kick), 6:02. Broncos 14–0.
- DEN – Gerald Willhite 1-yard run (Rich Karlis kick), 5:45. Broncos 21–0. **Drive: 1 play, 1 yard, 0:03.**

**Second quarter**

- DEN – Gerald Willhite 70-yard punt return (Rich Karlis kick), 9:06. Broncos 28–0.
- DEN – Rich Karlis 37-yard field goal, 4:10. Broncos 31–0. **Drive: 7 plays, 34 yards, 2:52.**
- KC – Henry Marshall 15-yard pass from Bill Kenney (Nick Lowery kick), 1:24. Broncos 31–7. **Drive: 7 plays, 83 yards, 2:46.**

**Third quarter**

- KC – Carlos Carson 27-yard pass from Bill Kenney (Nick Lowery kick), 12:55. Broncos 31–14. **Drive: 1 play, 27 yards, 0:06.**
- DEN – Gerald Willhite 1-yard run (Rich Karlis kick), 7:53. Broncos 38–14. **Drive: 6 plays, 49 yards, 3:54.**
- KC – Nick Lowery 37-yard field goal, 5:51. Broncos 38–17. **Drive: 4 plays, 0 yards, 2:02.**

**Fourth quarter**

- No scoring plays.

**Top passers**

- KC – Bill Kenney – 18/42, 179 yards, 2 TD, INT
- DEN – John Elway – 15/29, 196 yards

**Top rushers**

- KC – Mike Pruitt – 8 rushes, 34 yards
- DEN – Sammy Winder – 17 rushes, 40 yards

**Top receivers**

- KC – Carlos Carson – 4 receptions, 97 yards, TD
- DEN – Orson Mobley – 3 receptions, 51 yards

==== Week 12: at St. Louis Cardinals ====
Week 12: Kansas City Chiefs at St. Louis Cardinals – Game summary

Quarter	1	2	3	4	Total
Chiefs	0	0	0	14	**14**
**Cardinals**	6	3	7	7	**23**

at Busch Memorial Stadium, St. Louis, Missouri

- Date: November 23
- Game time: 3:00 p.m. CST
- Game weather: Cloudy, 45 °F (7 °C)
- Game attendance: 29,680
- Referee: Red Cashion
- TV announcers (NBC): Charlie Jones and Jimmy Cefalo
- Recap, Game Book

Game information

**First quarter**

- STL – Roy Green 5-yard pass from Neil Lomax (pass failed), 3:43. Cardinals 6–0. **Drive: 9 plays, 77 yards, 3:59.**

**Second quarter**

- STL – Eric Schubert 20-yard field goal, 2:58. Cardinals 9–0. **Drive: 4 plays, 3 yards, 1:35.**

**Third quarter**

- STL – J. T. Smith 25-yard pass from Neil Lomax (Eric Schubert kick), 6:46. Cardinals 16–0. **Drive: 7 plays, 80 yards, 4:08.**

**Fourth quarter**

- STL – J. T. Smith 4-yard pass from Neil Lomax (Eric Schubert kick), 11:21. Cardinals 23–0. **Drive: 11 plays, 70 yards, 5:52.**
- KC – Stephone Paige 6-yard pass from Bill Kenney (Nick Lowery kick), 7:53. Cardinals 23–7. **Drive: 8 plays, 69 yards, 3:28.**
- KC – Stephone Paige 13-yard pass from Bill Kenney (Nick Lowery kick), 4:26. Cardinals 23–14. **Drive: 7 plays, 65 yards, 1:20.**

**Top passers**

- KC – Bill Kenney – 24/43, 223 yards, 2 TD, 2 INT
- STL – Neil Lomax – 17/29, 185 yards, 3 TD, INT

**Top rushers**

- KC – Mike Pruitt – 9 rushes, 29 yards
- STL – Stump Mitchell – 13 rushes, 45 yards

**Top receivers**

- KC – Henry Marshall – 6 receptions, 83 yards
- STL – Roy Green – 7 receptions, 69 yards, TD

==== Week 13: vs. Buffalo Bills ====
Week 13: Buffalo Bills at Kansas City Chiefs – Game summary

Quarter	1	2	3	4	Total
**Bills**	0	10	7	0	**17**
Chiefs	7	0	0	7	**14**

at Arrowhead Stadium, Kansas City, Missouri

- Date: November 30
- Game time: 12:00 p.m. CST
- Game weather: Cloudy, 40 °F (4 °C)
- Game attendance: 31,492
- Referee: Tom Dooley
- TV announcers (NBC): Gary Gerould and Butch Johnson
- Recap, Game Book

Game information

**First quarter**

- KC – Stephone Paige 12-yard pass from Bill Kenney (Nick Lowery kick), 7:13. Chiefs 7–0. **Drive: 12 plays, 83 yards, 4:54.**

**Second quarter**

- BUF – Scott Norwood 47-yard field goal, 14:51. Chiefs 7–3. **Drive: 14 plays, 55 yards, 7:11.**
- BUF – Andre Reed 9-yard pass from Jim Kelly (Scott Norwood kick), 6:07. Bills 10–7. **Drive: 10 plays, 77 yards, 3:56.**

**Third quarter**

- BUF – Andre Reed 10-yard pass from Jim Kelly (Scott Norwood kick), 8:48. Bills 17–7. **Drive: 11 plays, 66 yards, 4:35.**

**Fourth quarter**

- KC – Herman Heard 1-yard run (Nick Lowery kick), 4:34. Bills 17–14. **Drive: 8 plays, 80 yards, 2:23.**

**Top passers**

- BUF – Jim Kelly – 17/34, 190 yards, 2 TD, INT
- KC – Bill Kenney – 25/50, 286 yards, TD, 3 INT

**Top rushers**

- BUF – Robb Riddick – 27 rushes, 118 yards
- KC – Mike Pruitt – 9 rushes, 23 yards

**Top receivers**

- BUF – Andre Reed – 7 receptions, 95 yards, 2 TD
- KC – Stephone Paige – 9 receptions, 119 yards, TD

==== Week 14: vs. Denver Broncos ====
Week 14: Denver Broncos at Kansas City Chiefs – Game summary

Quarter	1	2	3	4	Total
Broncos	3	7	0	0	**10**
**Chiefs**	3	7	7	20	**37**

at Arrowhead Stadium, Kansas City, Missouri

- Date: December 7
- Game time: 12:00 p.m. CST
- Game weather: Overcast, 45 °F (7 °C)
- Game attendance: 47,019
- Referee: Dick Hantak
- TV announcers (NBC): Don Criqui and Bob Trumpy
- Recap, Game Book

Game information

**First quarter**

- KC – Nick Lowery 30-yard field goal, 9:13. Chiefs 3–0. **Drive: 6 plays, 23 yards, 2:15.**
- DEN – Rich Karlis 26-yard field goal, 0:53. Tied 3–3. **Drive: 11 plays, 46 yards, 5:19.**

**Second quarter**

- KC – Stephone Paige 9-yard pass from Todd Blackledge (Nick Lowery kick), 4:01. Chiefs 10–3. **Drive: 2 plays, 17 yards, 0:12.**
- DEN – Sammy Winder 2-yard pass from John Elway (Rich Karlis kick), 0:16. Tied 10–10. **Drive: 10 plays, 58 yards, 3:36.**

**Third quarter**

- KC – Jeff Smith 17-yard pass from Todd Blackledge (Nick Lowery kick), 7:36. Chiefs 17–10. **Drive: 11 plays, 50 yards, 6:00.**

**Fourth quarter**

- KC – Boyce Green 1-yard run (Nick Lowery kick), 12:54. Chiefs 24–10. **Drive: 5 plays, 11 yards, 2:13.**
- KC – Nick Lowery 45-yard field goal, 11:20. Chiefs 27–10. **Drive: 4 plays, –7 yards, 1:13.**
- KC – Nick Lowery 44-yard field goal, 2:58. Chiefs 30–10. **Drive: 4 plays, 3 yards, 2:06.**
- KC – Lloyd Burruss 72-yard interception return (Nick Lowery kick), 1:34. Chiefs 37–10.

**Top passers**

- DEN – John Elway – 23/42, 246 yards, TD, 4 INT
- KC – Todd Blackledge – 14/29, 106 yards, 2 TD

**Top rushers**

- DEN – Sammy Winder – 13 rushes, 28 yards
- KC – Larry Moriarty – 10 rushes, 47 yards

**Top receivers**

- DEN – Mark Jackson – 4 receptions, 78 yards
- KC – Henry Marshall – 5 receptions, 33 yards

==== Week 15: at Los Angeles Raiders ====
Week 15: Kansas City Chiefs at Los Angeles Raiders – Game summary

Quarter	1	2	3	4	Total
**Chiefs**	10	10	0	0	**20**
Raiders	0	10	7	0	**17**

at Los Angeles Memorial Coliseum, Los Angeles, California

- Date: December 14
- Game time: 3:00 p.m. CST/1:00 p.m. PST
- Game weather: Cloudy, 70 °F (21 °C)
- Game attendance: 60,952
- Referee: Jerry Markbreit
- TV announcers (NBC): Tom Hammond and Reggie Rucker
- Recap, Game Book

Game information

**First quarter**

- KC – Nick Lowery 30-yard field goal, 11:07. Chiefs 3–0. **Drive: 4 plays, 3 yards, 0:59.**
- KC – Stephone Paige 26-yard pass from Bill Kenney (Nick Lowery kick), 8:34. Chiefs 10–0. **Drive: 3 plays, 36 yards, 0:51.**

**Second quarter**

- KC – Jeff Smith 2-yard run (Nick Lowery kick), 14:15. Chiefs 17–0. **Drive: 12 plays, 78 yards, 5:18.**
- RAI – Rod Barksdale 34-yard pass from Jim Plunkett (Chris Bahr kick), 12:05. Chiefs 17–7. **Drive: 4 plays, 38 yards, 1:53.**
- RAI – Chris Bahr 19-yard field goal, 3:57. Chiefs 17–10. **Drive: 12 plays, 63 yards, 5:54.**
- KC – Nick Lowery 20-yard field goal, 0:42. Chiefs 20–10. **Drive: 8 plays, 78 yards, 3:15.**

**Third quarter**

- RAI – Marcus Allen 2-yard run (Chris Bahr kick), 0:45. Chiefs 20–17. **Drive: 11 plays, 83 yards, 5:44.**

**Fourth quarter**

- No scoring plays.

**Top passers**

- KC – Bill Kenney – 15/31, 180 yards, TD
- RAI – Jim Plunkett – 15/29, 143 yards, TD, 4 INT

**Top rushers**

- KC – Boyce Green – 10 rushes, 51 yards
- RAI – Marcus Allen – 13 rushes, 60 yards, TD

**Top receivers**

- KC – Stephone Paige – 4 receptions, 58 yards, TD
- RAI – Rod Barksdale – 3 receptions, 60 yards, TD

==== Week 16: at Pittsburgh Steelers ====
Week 16: Kansas City Chiefs at Pittsburgh Steelers – Game summary

Quarter	1	2	3	4	Total
**Chiefs**	7	17	0	0	**24**
Steelers	0	6	7	6	**19**

at Three Rivers Stadium, Pittsburgh, Pennsylvania

- Date: December 21
- Game time: 1:00 p.m. EST/12:00 p.m. CST
- Game weather: Partly Cloudy, 34 °F (1 °C)
- Game attendance: 47,150
- Referee: Gene Barth
- TV announcers (NBC): Don Criqui and Bob Trumpy
- Recap, Game Book

Game information

**First quarter**

- KC – Deron Cherry blocked punt recovery in endzone (Nick Lowery kick), 6:33. Chiefs 7–0.

**Second quarter**

- KC – Nick Lowery 47-yard field goal, 10:51. Chiefs 10–0. **Drive: 8 plays, 58 yards, 4:03.**
- PIT – Gary Anderson 31-yard field goal, 8:04. Chiefs 10–3. **Drive: 8 plays, 60 yards, 2:47.**
- KC – Boyce Green 97-yard kickoff return (Nick Lowery kick), 7:36. Chiefs 17–3.
- PIT – Gary Anderson 31-yard field goal, 3:44. Chiefs 17–6. **Drive: 8 plays, 49 yards, 4:02.**
- KC – Lloyd Burruss 78-yard return of blocked field goal (Nick Lowery kick), 0:30. Chiefs 24–6.

**Third quarter**

- PIT – Mark Malone 9-yard run (Gary Anderson kick), 5:54. Chiefs 24–13. **Drive: 10 plays, 78 yards, 4:53.**

**Fourth quarter**

- PIT – Gary Anderson 31-yard field goal, 14:49. Chiefs 24–16. **Drive: 9 plays, 50 yards, 4:18.**
- PIT – Gary Anderson 26-yard field goal, 7:50. Chiefs 24–19. **Drive: 9 plays, 85 yards, 2:39.**

**Top passers**

- KC – Bill Kenney – 12/23, 147 yards, INT
- PIT – Mark Malone – 22/43, 351 yards, INT

**Top rushers**

- KC – Boyce Green – 3 rushes, 14 yards
- PIT – Walter Abercrombie – 19 rushes, 98 yards

**Top receivers**

- KC – Emile Harry – 2 receptions, 74 yards
- PIT – Louis Lipps – 6 receptions, 92 yards

=== Standings ===
AFC West
	W	L	T	PCT	DIV	CONF	PF	PA	STK
^{(2)} Denver Broncos	11	5	0	.688	5–3	8–4	378	327	L1
^{(5)} Kansas City Chiefs	10	6	0	.625	5–3	9–5	358	326	W3
Seattle Seahawks	10	6	0	.625	5–3	7–5	366	293	W5
Los Angeles Raiders	8	8	0	.500	4–4	7–5	323	346	L4
San Diego Chargers	4	12	0	.250	1–7	4–8	335	396	L2

== Postseason ==
=== Schedule ===
Round	Date	Opponent (seed)	Result	Record	Venue	Attendance	Recap
Wild Card	December 28	at New York Jets (4)	L 15–35	0–1	Giants Stadium	69,307	Recap

=== Game summaries ===
==== AFC Wild Card Playoffs: at (4) New York Jets ====
AFC Wild Card Playoffs: (5) Kansas City Chiefs at (4) New York Jets – Game summary

Quarter	1	2	3	4	Total
Chiefs	6	0	0	9	15
Jets	7	14	7	7	35

at Giants Stadium, East Rutherford, New Jersey

- Date: December 28
- Game time: 12:30 p.m. EST/11:30 a.m. CST
- Game weather: Cloudy, 37 °F (3 °C)
- Game attendance: 69,307
- Referee: Red Cashion
- TV announcers (NBC): Marv Albert and Bob Griese
- Recap, Game Book

Game information

First quarter

- KC – Jeff Smith 1-yard run (kick failed, wide right), 8:01. Chiefs 6–0. Drive: 9 plays, 67 yards, 5:29.
- NYJ – Freeman McNeil 1-yard run (Pat Leahy kick), 0:46. Jets 7–6. Drive: 13 plays, 75 yards, 7:15.

Second quarter

- NYJ – Freeman McNeil 1-yard pass from Pat Ryan (Pat Leahy kick), 9:12. Jets 14–6. Drive: 12 plays, 47 yards, 6:14.
- NYJ – Al Toon 11-yard pass from Pat Ryan (Pat Leahy kick), 0:59. Jets 21–6. Drive: 8 plays, 62 yards, 1:40.

Third quarter

- NYJ – Kevin McArthur 21-yard interception return (Pat Leahy kick), 14:47. Jets 28–6.

Fourth quarter

- KC – Albert Lewis blocked punt recovery in endzone (Nick Lowery kick), 14:46. Jets 28–13.
- NYJ – Billy Griggs 6-yard pass from Pat Ryan (Pat Leahy kick), 10:49. Jets 35–13. Drive: 7 plays, 61 yards, 3:57.
- KC – Dave Jennings OB in end zone for a Safety, 2:59. Jets 35–15.

Top passers

- KC – Todd Blackledge – 12/21, 80 yards, 2 INT
- NYJ – Pat Ryan – 16/23, 153 yards, 3 TD

Top rushers

- KC – Boyce Green – 8 rushes, 15 yards
- NYJ – Freeman McNeil – 31 rushes, 135 yards, TD

Top receivers

- KC – Henry Marshall – 6 receptions, 72 yards
- NYJ – Al Toon – 4 receptions, 48 yards, TD

Quarterback Pat Ryan led the Jets to the victory with 3 touchdown passes. The Chiefs scored first on a 67-yard drive capped by running back Jeff Smith. On their ensuing possession, the Jets faced fourth down and 6 on the Kansas City 33-yard line. Rather than attempt a long field goal, Ryan faked a handoff and rushed for a 24 yard gain. Two plays later, running back Freeman McNeil scored on a 4-yard rushing touchdown. In the second period, Ryan completed two touchdown pass: a 1-yarder to McNeil and an 11-yarder to wide receiver Al Toon. On the first play of the second half, Jets linebacker Kevin McArthur returned an interception 21 yards for a touchdown. Ryan later clinched the victory in the fourth period with a 6-yard touchdown pass to tight end Billy Griggs. The Chiefs' only scores in the second half was a blocked punt recovery in the end zone, and an intentional safety by the Jets.

McNeil finished the game with 135 rushing yards, 3 receptions for 16 yards, and 2 touchdowns.
