= 1986 Los Angeles Raiders season =

NFL team season

- Owner: Al Davis
- General manager: Al Davis
- Head coach: Tom Flores
- Home stadium: L.A. Memorial Coliseum

Results
- Record: 8–8
- Division place: 4th AFC West
- Playoffs: Did not qualify

The 1986 Los Angeles Raiders season was their 27th in the league. They were unable to improve upon the previous season's output of 12–4, winning only eight games. The team failed to qualify for the playoffs for the first time in five seasons. This would also be Ray Guy's final season of his Hall of Fame career with the Raiders.

The 1986 season was marked by highly competitive games (only four of the Raiders' sixteen regular season games were decided by more than a touchdown). The campaign also marked the end of storied quarterback Jim Plunkett's career. After starting the season 0–3, the Raiders proceeded to win eight of their next nine games. A loss to Philadelphia in overtime started a spiral for the Raiders, who lost the next three games, which included a blowout loss to Seattle and a loss to Kansas City (who edged out Seattle for a playoff spot with ten wins) where the Raiders had seven turnovers and still lost by three points.

== Offseason ==
=== NFL draft ===
1986 Los Angeles Raiders draft
Round	Pick	Player	Position	College	Notes
1	1	Bo Jackson *	RB	Auburn	
1	24	Bob Buczkowski	DE	Pittsburgh	
3	80	Brad Cochran	DB	Michigan	
4	85	Mike Wise	DE	California-Davis	
4	103	Vance Mueller	RB	Occidental	
4	108	Napoleon McCallum	RB	Navy	
6	164	Doug Marrone	OG	Syracuse	
7	191	Bill Lewis	C	Nebraska	
8	219	Joe Mauntel	LB	Eastern Kentucky	
9	246	Zeph Lee	RB	USC	
10	275	Jeff Reinke	DE	Minnesota State	
11	302	Randall Webster	LB	SW Oklahoma State	
12	330	Larry Shepherd	WR	Houston	
Made roster † Pro Football Hall of Fame * Made at least one Pro Bowl during career

== Personnel ==
=== Staff ===
1986 Los Angeles Raiders staff
Front office: Owner/General Manager — Al Davis; Head of Pro Scouting/Tight Ends — Bob Mischak; Head of Football Operations/Special Teams — Steve Ortmayer; Head coaches: Head Coach — Tom Flores; Offensive coaches: Quarterbacks — Larry Kennan; Running Backs — Bo Jackson; Wide Receivers — Tom Walsh; Offensive Line — Sam Boghosian/Art Shell; Offensive Quality Control — Terry Robiskie	Defensive coaches: Defensive Line — Earl Leggett; Linebackers — Bob Zeman; Defensive Backs — Chet Franklin/Willie Brown

=== Roster ===
1986 Los Angeles Raiders roster
Quarterbacks (QB): 12 Rusty Hilger; 16 Jim Plunkett; 6 Marc Wilson; Running backs (RB): 32 Marcus Allen; 27 Frank Hawkins; 34 Napoleon McCallum; 42 Vance Mueller; 39 Steve Strachan; Wide receivers (WR): 88 Rod Barksdale; 84 Jessie Hester; 83 Tim Moffett; 89 Mark Pattison; Tight ends (TE): 46 Todd Christensen; 31 Derrick Jensen	Offensive linemen (OL): 79 Bruce Davis T; 73 Charley Hannah G; 74 Shelby Jordan T; 70 Henry Lawrence T; 51 Bill Lewis C; 65 Mickey Marvin G; 72 Don Mosebar C; 77 Chris Riehm G; Defensive linemen (DL): 94 Elvis Franks DE; 99 Sean Jones DE; 75 Howie Long DE; 71 Bill Pickel NT; 93 Greg Townsend DE; 98 Mitch Willis NT	Linebackers (LB): 56 Jeff Barnes OLB; 59 Jamie Kimmel ILB; 52 Linden King OLB; 53 Rod Martin OLB; 54 Reggie McKenzie ILB; 55 Matt Millen ILB; 57 Jerry Robinson OLB; Defensive backs (DB): 44 Stefon Adams SS; 45 James Davis CB; 22 Mike Haynes CB; 26 Vann McElroy FS; 43 Sam Seale CB; 23 Odis McKinney FS; 30 Stacey Toran SS; Special teams (ST): 10 Chris Bahr K; 8 Ray Guy P; 41 Fulton Walker RS	Reserve: 82 Gene Branton TE (IR); 95 Bob Buczkowski DE (IR); 38 Brad Cochran CB (IR); 36 Mike Davis S (IR); 37 Lester Hayes CB (IR); -- Ronnie James RB (IR); 87 Trey Junkin TE (IR); 40 Zeph Lee RB (IR); 60 Curt Marsh G (IR); 81 Andy Parker TE (IR); 97 Jeff Reincke DE (IR); 69 Rusty Russell T (IR); 25 Martin Sartin RB (IR); 15 Brad Tubbs WR (IR); 85 Dokie Williams WR (IR); 24 Gardner Williams CB (IR); 90 Mike Wise DE (IR); Rookies in italics

== Schedule ==
Week	Date	Opponent	Result	Record	Venue	Attendance	Recap
1	September 7	at **Denver Broncos**	**L** 36–38	0–1	Mile High Stadium	75,695	Recap
2	September 14	at Washington Redskins	**L** 6–10	0–2	RFK Stadium	55,235	Recap
3	September 21	New York Giants	**L** 9–14	0–3	Los Angeles Memorial Coliseum	71,164	Recap
4	September 28	**San Diego Chargers**	**W** 17–13	1–3	Los Angeles Memorial Coliseum	63,153	Recap
5	October 5	at **Kansas City Chiefs**	**W** 24–17	2–3	Arrowhead Stadium	74,430	Recap
6	October 12	**Seattle Seahawks**	**W** 14–10	3–3	Los Angeles Memorial Coliseum	70,635	Recap
7	October 19	at Miami Dolphins	**W** 30–28	4–3	Miami Orange Bowl	53,421	Recap
8	October 26	at Houston Oilers	**W** 28–17	5–3	Houston Astrodome	41,641	Recap
9	November 2	**Denver Broncos**	**L** 10–21	5–4	Los Angeles Memorial Coliseum	90,153	Recap
10	November 9	at Dallas Cowboys	**W** 17–13	6–4	Texas Stadium	61,706	Recap
11	November 16	Cleveland Browns	**W** 27–14	7–4	Los Angeles Memorial Coliseum	65,461	Recap
12	November 20	at **San Diego Chargers**	**W** 37–31	8–4	Jack Murphy Stadium	56,031	Recap
13	November 30	Philadelphia Eagles	**L** 27–33	8–5	Los Angeles Memorial Stadium	53,338	Recap
14	December 8	at **Seattle Seahawks**	**L** 0–37	8–6	Kingdome	62,923	Recap
15	December 14	**Kansas City Chiefs**	**L** 17–20	8–7	Los Angeles Memorial Coliseum	60,952	Recap
16	December 21	Indianapolis Colts	**L** 24–30	8–8	Los Angeles Memorial Coliseum	41,349	Recap
Note: Intra-division opponents are in **bold** text.

== Season summary ==
=== Week 4 ===
Team	1	2	3	4	Total
Chargers	6	7	0	0	13
• Raiders	0	7	7	3	17

- Date: September 28
- Location: Los Angeles Memorial Coliseum, Los Angeles
- Game start: 4:00 p.m.
- Game weather: 62 °F (16.7 °C); wind 9 miles per hour (14 km/h; 7.8 kn)

Scoring summary
Q1	SD	Winslow 9 yard pass from Fouts (kick failed)	SD 6–0
Q2	SD	Johnson 9 yard pass from Fouts (Benirschke kick)	SD 13–0
Q2	LA	Williams 12 yard pass from Wilson (Bahr kick)	SD 13–7
Q3	LA	Hester 40 yard pass from Wilson (Bahr kick)	LA 14–13
Q4	LA	Bahr 18 yard field goal	LA 17–13

=== Week 5 at Chiefs ===
Week Five: Los Angeles Raiders at Kansas City Chiefs

Quarter	1	2	3	4	Total
Raiders	0	7	14	3	24
Chiefs	10	7	0	0	17

at Arrowhead Stadium • Kansas City, Missouri

- Date: October 5
- Game time: 12:00 p.m. CDT
- Game weather: 57 °F (14 °C) • Wind 8 miles per hour (13 km/h; 7.0 kn)
- Game attendance: 74,430
- Referee: Bob Frederic
- TV announcers (NBC): Don Criqui and Bob Trumpy
- Pro-Football-Reference.com, The Football Database

Game information

Raiders

- Jim Plunkett
  8/10, 108 Yds, TD
- Napoleon McCallum
  19 Rush, 69 Yds
- Dokie Williams
  6 Rec, 90 Yds

Chiefs

- Todd Blackledge
  9/21, 77 Yds, TD, INT
- Boyce Green
  8 Rush, 39 Yds, TD
- Jeff Smith
  5 Rec, 51 Yds

Scoring summary

Quarter	Time	Drive			Team	Scoring information	Score	
Quarter	Time	Plays	Yards	TOP	Team	Scoring information	LA	KC
1	9:42				Chiefs	24-yard field goal by Nick Lowery	0	3
1	5:56				Chiefs	Boyce Green 18-yard touchdown run, Nick Lowery kick good	0	10
2	12:27				Chiefs	Paul Coffman 1-yard touchdown reception from Todd Blackledge, Nick Lowery kick good	0	17
2	4:20				Raiders	Dokie Williams 12-yard touchdown reception from Marc Wilson, Chris Bahr kick good	7	17
3	10:18				Raiders	Napoleon McCallum 12-yard touchdown run, Chris Bahr kick good	14	17
3	5:43				Raiders	Jessie Hester 18-yard touchdown reception from Jim Plunkett, Chris Bahr kick good	21	17
4	2:55				Raiders	19-yard field goal by Chris Bahr	24	17
"TOP" = time of possession. For other American football terms, see Glossary of American football.							24	17

=== Week 6 ===
Team	1	2	3	4	Total
Seahawks	0	3	7	0	10
• Raiders	7	7	0	0	14

- Date: October 12
- Location: Los Angeles Memorial Coliseum, Los Angeles
- Game start: 4:00 p.m.est
- Game weather: 66 °F (18.9 °C); wind 9 miles per hour (14 km/h; 7.8 kn)

Scoring summary
Q1	LA	Williams 9 yard pass from Plunkett (Bahr kick)	LA 7–0
Q2	LA	Hester 49 yard pass from Plunkett (Bahr kick)	LA 14–0
Q2	SEA	Johnson 30 yard field goal	LA 14–3
Q3	SEA	Warner 1 yard run (Johnson kick)	LA 14–10

=== Week 7 ===
Team	1	2	3	4	Total
• Raiders	6	17	0	7	30
Dolphins	0	7	7	14	28

- Date: October 19
- Location: Orange Bowl, Miami, Florida
- Game start: 1:00 p.m.
- Game weather: 74 °F (23 °C); wind 15 mph (24 km/h)
- Referee: Tom Dooley
- TV announcers (NBC): Dick Enberg and Merlin Olsen

Scoring summary
1	LA	Chris Bahr 32 yard field goal	LA 3–0
1	LA	Chris Bahr 33 yard field goal	LA 6–0
2	MIA	Bruce Hardy 18 yard pass from Dan Marino (Fuad Reveiz kick)	MIA 7–6
2	LA	Marcus Allen 2 yard run (Chris Bahr kick)	LA 13–7
2	LA	Marcus Allen 16 yard pass from Marc Wilson (Chris Bahr kick)	LA 20–7
2	LA	Chris Bahr 40 yard field goal	LA 23–7
3	MIA	Dan Johnson 5 yard pass from Dan Marino (Fuad Reveiz kick)	LA 23–14
4	LA	Marcus Allen 2 yard run (Chris Bahr kick)	LA 30–14
4	MIA	Lorenzo Hampton 2 yard run (Fuad Reveiz kick)	LA 30–21
4	MIA	Mark Clayton 68 yard pass from Dan Marino (Fuad Reveiz kick)	LA 30–28

=== Week 8 ===
Team	1	2	3	4	Total
• Raiders	7	14	7	0	28
Oilers	0	7	10	0	17

- Date: October 26
- Location: Houston Astrodome, Houston, Texas
- Game start: 1:00 p.m. EST
- Game weather: Indoors (dome)

Scoring summary
Q1	LA	Parker 2 yard pass from Wilson (Bahr kick)	LA 7–0
Q2	LA	Christensen 14 yard pass from Wilson (Bahr kick)	LA 14–0
Q2	HOU	Givins 43 yard run (Zendejas kick)	LA 14–7
Q2	LA	Christensen 32 yard pass from Wilson (Bahr kick)	LA 21–7
Q3	LA	Christensen 3 yard pass from Wilson (Bahr kick)	LA 28–7
Q3	HOU	Zendejas 48 yard field goal	LA 28–10
Q3	HOU	Rozier 4 yard run (Zendejas kick)	LA 28–17

=== Week 10 ===
Team	1	2	3	4	Total
• Raiders	0	3	7	7	17
Cowboys	3	7	3	0	13

- Date: November 9
- Location: Texas Stadium, Irving, Texas
- Game start: 4:00 p.m.
- Game weather: 56 °F (13.3 °C); wind 13 miles per hour (21 km/h; 11 kn)
- Referee: Pat Haggerty
- TV announcers (NBC): Dick Enberg and Merlin Olsen

Scoring summary
Q1	DAL	Septien 20 yard field goal	DAL 3–0
Q2	LA	Bahr 45 yard field goal	Tie 3–3
Q2	DAL	Dorsett 13 yard run (Septien kick)	DAL 10–3
Q3	LA	Williams 20 yard pass from Plunkett (Bahr kick)	Tie 10–10
Q3	DAL	Septien 20 yard field goal	DAL 13–10
Q4	LA	Williams 40 yard pass from Plunkett (Bahr kick)	LA 17–13

- Dokie Williams 5 Rec, 107 Yds

== Standings ==
AFC West
	W	L	T	PCT	DIV	CONF	PF	PA	STK
Denver Broncos^{(2)}	11	5	0	.688	5–3	8–4	378	327	L1
Kansas City Chiefs^{(5)}	10	6	0	.625	5–3	9–5	358	326	W3
Seattle Seahawks	10	6	0	.625	5–3	7–5	366	293	W5
Los Angeles Raiders	8	8	0	.500	4–4	7–5	323	346	L4
San Diego Chargers	4	12	0	.250	1–7	4–8	335	396	L2
