= 1986 Seattle Seahawks season =

American football team season

- Owner: The Nordstrom family
- General manager: Mike McCormack
- Head coach: Chuck Knox
- Offensive coordinator: Steve Moore
- Defensive coordinator: Tom Catlin
- Home stadium: Kingdome

Results
- Record: 10–6
- Division place: 3rd AFC West
- Playoffs: Did not qualify
- All-Pros: RB Curt Warner (2nd team); KR/PR Bobby Joe Edmonds (1st team)
- Pro Bowlers: RB Curt Warner; WR Steve Largent; DE Jacob Green; LB Fredd Young; KR/PR Bobby Joe Edmonds

The 1986 Seattle Seahawks season was the team's eleventh in the National Football League (NFL). Despite posting a 10–6 record and having a dominant five-game win streak to close out the season, the Seahawks narrowly missed the playoffs, losing the tiebreakers with both AFC wild card teams.

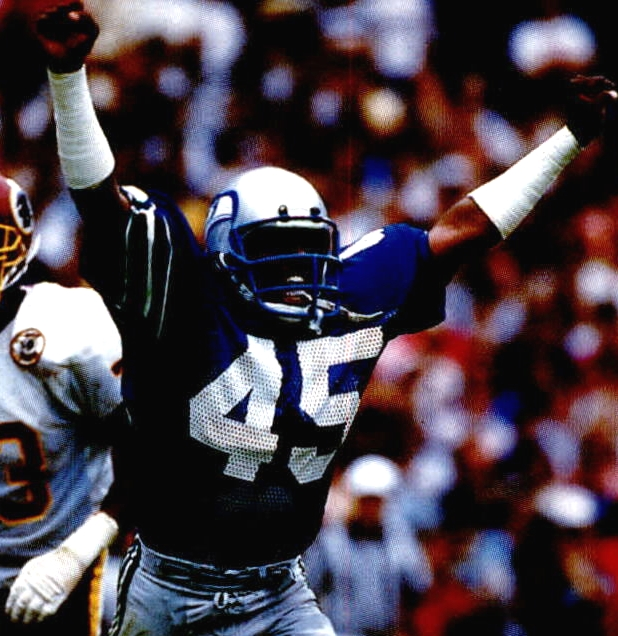
Safety Kenny Easley playing against the Washington Redskins in Week 4

Prior to this season, the team moved its Kirkland headquarters a mile east, from the former shipyard on the shore of Lake Washington to a new facility at Northwest College. Summer training camp was held at the new site rather than at Eastern Washington University in Cheney, southwest of Spokane.

== 1986 NFL draft ==
1986 Seattle Seahawks draft
| Round | Selection | Player | Position | College |
|---|---|---|---|---|
| 1 | 15 | John L. Williams | Running back | Florida |
| 3 | 68 | Patrick Hunter | Defensive back | Nevada-Reno |
| 5 | 126 | Bobby Joe Edmonds | Running Back | Arkansas |
| 6 | 153 | Eddie Anderson | Defensive Back | Fort Valley State |
| 7 | 181 | Paul Miles | Running Back | Nebraska |
| 8 | 211 | Alonzo Mitz | Defensive end | Florida |
| 9 | 237 | Mike Black | Offensive tackle | Sacramento State |
| 10 | 264 | Don Fairbanks | Defensive End | Colorado |
| 11 | 291 | David Norrie | Quarterback | UCLA |
| 12 | 321 | John McVeigh | Linebacker | Miami (FL) |

== Personnel ==
=== Staff / Coaches ===
1986 Seattle Seahawks staff
| **Front office**: President/general manager – Mike McCormack; Assistant general manager – Chuck Allen; Player personnel director – Mike Allman; Assistant player personnel director – Rick Thompson; Pro personnel assistant – Randy Mueller; **Head coaches**: Head coach – Chuck Knox; Assistant head coach – Tom Catlin; **Offensive coaches**: Offensive coordinator/receivers – Steve Moore; Quarterbacks – Ken Meyer; Offensive backs – Chick Harris; Tight ends – Rusty Tillman; Offensive line – Kent Stephenson; Special assignments – Russ Purnell | **Defensive coaches**: Defensive coordinator/linebackers – Tom Catlin; Defensive line – George Dyer; Defensive backs – Ralph Hawkins; Special assignments – Joe Vitt; **Special teams coaches**: Special teams – Rusty Tillman |

- Head athletic trainer - Jim Whitesel
- Assistant athletic trainer - John Kasik

=== Final roster ===
1986 Seattle Seahawks roster
| **Quarterbacks (QB)**: 7 Gale Gilbert; **17** Dave Krieg; **Running backs (RB)**: 30 Bobby Joe Edmonds; 37 Eric Lane; 43 Randall Morris; **28** Curt Warner; **32** John L. Williams; **Wide receivers (WR)**: 83 Ray Butler; **80** Steve Largent; 82 Paul Skansi; **81** Daryl Turner; 89 Byron Walker; **Tight ends (TE)**: 85 Gordon Hudson; **86** Mike Tice | **Offensive linemen (OL)**: **65** Edwin Bailey G; 76 Jon Borchardt G/T; 52 Will Grant C; 60 Glenn Hyde C; 62 Kani Kauahi C; **70** Ron Mattes T; **71** Bryan Millard G; 74 Curt Singer T; **75** Mike Wilson T; **Defensive linemen (DL)**: **77** Jeff Bryant DE; 68 Randy Edwards DE; **79** Jacob Green DE; 61 Alonzo Mitz DE; **72** Joe Nash NT | **Linebackers (LB)**: **53** Keith Butler ILB; **56** Greg Gaines OLB; 55 Michael Jackson OLB; 54 John Kaiser OLB; 51 Sam Merriman ILB; **58** Bruce Scholtz OLB; **50** Fredd Young ILB; **Defensive backs (DB)**: 47 Eddie Anderson FS; **22** Dave Brown CB; 23 Patrick Hunter CB; 27 Gregg Johnson SS; 26 Kerry Justin CB; 21 Paul Moyer SS; **41** Eugene Robinson FS; **20** Terry Taylor CB; **Special teams (ST)**: 2 Vincent Gamache P; 9 Norm Johnson K | **Reserve**: **59** Blair Bush C (IR); 87 Tony Davis TE (IR); **45** Kenny Easley S (IR); 66 Stan Eisenhooth T (IR); 64 Ron Essink T (IR); 88 Byron Franklin WR (IR); 69 Rory Graves T (IR); 84 Danny Greene WR (IR); 63 Reggie Kinlaw NT (IR); 73 Alvin Powell G (IR); 8 Sean Salisbury QB (IR); Rookies in italics |

- Starters in bold.
- (*) Denotes players that were selected for the 1987 Pro Bowl.

== Schedule ==
=== Preseason ===
| Week | Date | Opponent | Result | Record | Venue | Recap |
|---|---|---|---|---|---|---|
| 1 | August 8 | Indianapolis Colts | **W** 21–14 | 1–0 | Kingdome | Recap |
| 2 | August 15 | at Detroit Lions | **L** 27–30 (OT) | 1–1 | Pontiac Silverdome | Recap |
| 3 | August 22 | Minnesota Vikings | **W** 27–17 | 2–1 | Kingdome | Recap |
| 4 | August 29 | at San Francisco 49ers | **L** 10–21 | 2–2 | Candlestick Park | Recap |

Source: Seahawks Media Guides

=== Regular season ===
Divisional matchups have the AFC West playing the NFC East.

| Week | Date | Opponent | Result | Record | Venue | Recap |
|---|---|---|---|---|---|---|
| 1 | September 7 | Pittsburgh Steelers | **W** 30–0 | 1–0 | Kingdome | Recap |
| 2 | September 14 | **Kansas City Chiefs** | **W** 23–17 | 2–0 | Kingdome | Recap |
| 3 | September 21 | at New England Patriots | **W** 38–31 | 3–0 | Sullivan Stadium | Recap |
| 4 | September 28 | at Washington Redskins | **L** 14–19 | 3–1 | RFK Stadium | Recap |
| 5 | October 6 | **San Diego Chargers** | **W** 33–7 | 4–1 | Kingdome | Recap |
| 6 | October 12 | at **Los Angeles Raiders** | **L** 10–14 | 4–2 | Los Angeles Memorial Coliseum | Recap |
| 7 | October 19 | New York Giants | **W** 17–12 | 5–2 | Kingdome | Recap |
| 8 | October 26 | at **Denver Broncos** | **L** 13–20 | 5–3 | Mile High Stadium | Recap |
| 9 | November 2 | New York Jets | **L** 7–38 | 5–4 | Kingdome | Recap |
| 10 | November 9 | at **Kansas City Chiefs** | **L** 7–27 | 5–5 | Arrowhead Stadium | Recap |
| 11 | November 16 | at Cincinnati Bengals | **L** 7–34 | 5–6 | Riverfront Stadium | Recap |
| 12 | November 23 | Philadelphia Eagles | **W** 24–20 | 6–6 | Kingdome | Recap |
| 13 | November 27 | at Dallas Cowboys | **W** 31–14 | 7–6 | Texas Stadium | Recap |
| 14 | December 8 | **Los Angeles Raiders** | **W** 37–0 | 8–6 | Kingdome | Recap |
| 15 | December 14 | at **San Diego Chargers** | **W** 34–24 | 9–6 | Jack Murphy Stadium | Recap |
| 16 | December 20 | **Denver Broncos** | **W** 41–16 | 10–6 | Kingdome | Recap |
Note: Intra-division opponents are in **bold** text.

Source: 1986 NFL season results

== Standings ==
AFC West
| | W | L | T | PCT | DIV | CONF | PF | PA | STK |
|---|---|---|---|---|---|---|---|---|---|
| ^{(2)} Denver Broncos | 11 | 5 | 0 | .688 | 5–3 | 8–4 | 378 | 327 | L1 |
| ^{(5)} Kansas City Chiefs | 10 | 6 | 0 | .625 | 5–3 | 9–5 | 358 | 326 | W3 |
| Seattle Seahawks | 10 | 6 | 0 | .625 | 5–3 | 7–5 | 366 | 293 | W5 |
| Los Angeles Raiders | 8 | 8 | 0 | .500 | 4–4 | 7–5 | 323 | 346 | L4 |
| San Diego Chargers | 4 | 12 | 0 | .250 | 1–7 | 4–8 | 335 | 396 | L2 |

== Game summaries ==
Even though the Seahawks did not qualify for the playoffs, a memorable moment during the season was Steve Largent breaking Harold Carmichael's NFL record for consecutive games (128) with at least one reception. It came on October 6 in a 33–7 home victory over the San Diego Chargers on Monday Night Football as Seattle improved its record to 4–1.

=== Preseason ===
==== Week P1: vs. Indianapolis Colts ====
Preseason Week One: Seattle Seahawks vs. Indianapolis Colts – Game summary

| Quarter | 1 | 2 | 3 | 4 | Total |
|---|---|---|---|---|---|
| Colts | 0 | 0 | 7 | 7 | 14 |
| Seahawks | 0 | 14 | 7 | 0 | 21 |

at Kingdome, Seattle

- Date: August 8
- Game time: 7:35 pm local
- Game weather: indoors
- Game attendance: 55,443
- Referee: Chuck Heberling
- Gamebook

==== Week P2: at Detroit Lions ====
Preseason Week Two: Seattle Seahawks at Detroit Lions – Game summary

| Quarter | 1 | 2 | 3 | 4 | OT | Total |
|---|---|---|---|---|---|---|
| Seahawks | 7 | 3 | 3 | 14 | 0 | 27 |
| Lions | 0 | 17 | 3 | 7 | 3 | 30 |

at Silverdome, Pontiac, Michigan

- Date: August 15
- Game time: 8:05 pm local
- Game weather: indoors
- Game attendance: 37,875
- Referee: Gene Barth
- TV: KING
- Gamebook

==== Week P3: vs. Minnesota Vikings ====
Preseason Week Three: Seattle Seahawks vs. Minnesota Vikings – Game summary

| Quarter | 1 | 2 | 3 | 4 | Total |
|---|---|---|---|---|---|
| Vikings | 7 | 7 | 0 | 3 | 17 |
| Seahawks | 0 | 14 | 3 | 10 | 27 |

at Kingdome, Seattle

- Date: August 22
- Game time: 7:34 pm local
- Game weather: indoors
- Game attendance: 57,730
- Referee: Fred Wyant
- Gamebook

==== Week P4: at San Francisco 49ers ====
Preseason Week Four: Seattle Seahawks at San Francisco 49ers – Game summary

| Quarter | 1 | 2 | 3 | 4 | Total |
|---|---|---|---|---|---|
| Seahawks | 3 | 7 | 0 | 0 | 10 |
| 49ers | 0 | 14 | 0 | 7 | 21 |

at Candlestick Park, San Francisco

- Date: August 29
- Game time: 6:01 pm local
- Game weather: partly cloudy, 65 °F (18 °C), wind NW 12 miles per hour (19 km/h)
- Game attendance: 52,419
- Referee: Ben Dreith
- TV: KING
- Gamebook

=== Regular season ===
==== Week 1: vs. Pittsburgh Steelers ====
Week One: Seattle Seahawks vs. Pittsburgh Steelers – Game summary

| Quarter | 1 | 2 | 3 | 4 | Total |
|---|---|---|---|---|---|
| Steelers | 0 | 0 | 0 | 0 | 0 |
| Seahawks | 0 | 6 | 10 | 14 | 30 |

at Kingdome, Seattle

- Date: September 7
- Game time: 1:02 pm local
- Game weather: indoors
- Game attendance: 61,461
- Referee: Jerry Seeman
- TV announcers (NBC): Tom Hammond and Dave Rowe
- Gamebook

Game information

First quarter

- No scoring plays

Second quarter

- SEA – Daryl Turner 4-yard pass from Dave Krieg (Norm Johnson kick), 3:25 (SEA 6–0)

Third quarter

- SEA – Dave Brown 18-yard interception return (Norm Johnson kick), 5:50 (SEA 13–0)
- SEA – Norm Johnson 24-yard field goal, 0:40 (SEA 16–0)

Fourth quarter

- SEA – Steve Largent 10-yard pass from Dave Krieg (Norm Johnson kick), 10:46 (SEA 23–0)
- SEA – Randall Morris 49-yard run (Norm Johnson kick), 2:35 (SEA 30–0)

Top passers

- PIT – Mark Malone: 9/27, 79 yds, 3 INT
- SEA – Dave Krieg: 21/33, 195 yds, 2 TD, 2 INT

Top rushers

- PIT – Frank Pollard: 8 car, 39 yds
- SEA – Curt Warner: 21 car, 114 yds

Top receivers

- PIT – John Stallworth: 4 rec, 41 yds
- SEA – Steve Largent: 7 rec, 65 yds, 1 TD

Team – pass – rush – total – to

- PIT – 61 – 85 – 146 – 5
- SEA – 172 – 202 – 374 – 2

==== Week 2: vs. Kansas City Chiefs ====
Week Two: Seattle Seahawks vs. Kansas City Chiefs – Game summary

| Quarter | 1 | 2 | 3 | 4 | Total |
|---|---|---|---|---|---|
| Chiefs | 3 | 0 | 7 | 7 | 17 |
| Seahawks | 0 | 13 | 10 | 0 | 23 |

at Kingdome, Seattle

- Date: September 14
- Game time: 1:02 pm local
- Game weather: indoors
- Game attendance: 61,068
- Referee: Dick Hantak
- TV announcers (NBC): Jay Randolph and Jimmy Cefalo
- Gamebook

Game information

First quarter

- KC – Nick Lowery 42-yard field goal, 10:31 (KC 3–0)

Second quarter

- SEA – Norm Johnson 35-yard field goal, 14:57 (Tied 3–3)
- SEA – Norm Johnson 34-yard field goal, 11:51 (SEA 6–3)
- SEA – Daryl Turner 6-yard pass from Dave Krieg (Norm Johnson kick), 2:56 (SEA 13–3)

Third quarter

- KC – Carlos Carson 70-yard pass from Todd Blackledge (Nick Lowery kick), 9:23 (SEA 13–10)
- SEA – Norm Johnson 53-yard field goal, 6:34 (SEA 16–10)
- SEA – Curt Warner 1-yard run (Norm Johnson kick), 3:47 (SEA 23–10)

Fourth quarter

- KC – Jeff Smith 1-yard run (Nick Lowery kick), 0:04 (SEA 23–17)

Top passers

- KC – Todd Blackledge: 15/29, 183 yds, 1 TD, 2 INT
- SEA – Dave Krieg: 21/35, 203 yds, 1 TD, 1 INT

Top rushers

- KC – Mike Pruitt: 6 car, 28 yds
- SEA – Curt Warner: 25 car, 80 yds, 1 TD

Top receivers

- KC – Carlos Carson: 2 rec, 80 yds, 1 TD
- SEA – Steve Largent: 5 rec, 62 yds

Team – pass – rush – total – to

- KC – 167 – 98 – 265 – 3
- SEA – 203 – 128 – 331 – 1

==== Week 3: at New England Patriots ====
Week Three: Seattle Seahawks at New England Patriots – Game summary

| Quarter | 1 | 2 | 3 | 4 | Total |
|---|---|---|---|---|---|
| Seahawks | 7 | 0 | 7 | 24 | 38 |
| Patriots | 7 | 10 | 0 | 14 | 31 |

at Sullivan Stadium, Foxborough, Massachusetts

- Date: September 21
- Game time: 1:00 pm local
- Game weather: drizzle, 53 °F (12 °C), 94% humidity, wind NE 11 miles per hour (18 km/h)
- Game attendance: 58,977
- Referee: Bob Frederic
- TV announcers (NBC): Tom Davis & Dave Rowe
- Gamebook

Game information

First quarter

- SEA – Curt Warner 13-yard run (Norm Johnson kick), 5:20 (SEA 7–0)
- NE – Tony Collins 6-yard run (Tony Franklin kick), 2:12 (Tied 7–7)

Second quarter

- NE – Tony Franklin 26-yard field goal, 6:39 (NE 10–7)
- NE – Stanley Morgan 27-yard pass from Tony Eason (Tony Franklin kick), 1:55 (NE 17–7)

Third quarter

- SEA – Ray Butler 54-yard pass from Dave Krieg (Norm Johnson kick), 7:34 (NE 17–14)

Fourth quarter

- NE – Stanley Morgan 44-yard pass from Tony Eason (Tony Franklin kick), 14:52 (NE 24–14)
- SEA – Curt Warner 1-yard run (Norm Johnson kick), 12:37 (SEA 24–21)
- NE – Stanley Morgan 30-yard pass from Tony Eason (Tony Franklin kick), 6:51 (NE 31–21)
- SEA – Norm Johnson 33-yard field goal, 2:35 (NE 31–24)
- SEA – Paul Moyer recovered fumble in end zone (Norm Johnson kick), 2:12 (Tied 31–31)
- SEA – Ray Butler 67-yard pass from Dave Krieg (Norm Johnson kick), 1:14 (SEA 38–31)

Top passers

- SEA – Dave Krieg: 9/20, 207 yds, 2 TD
- NE – Tony Eason: 26/45, 414 yds, 3 TD

Top rushers

- SEA – Curt Warner: 18 car, 73 yds, 2 TD
- NE – Craig James: 15 car, 52 yds

Top receivers

- SEA – Ray Butler: 3 rec, 128 yds, 2 TD
- NE – Stanley Morgan: 7 rec, 161 yds, 3 TD

Team – pass – rush – total – to

- SEA – 183 – 120 – 303 – 0
- NE – 386 – 120 – 506 – 1

==== Week 4: at Washington Redskins ====
Week Four: Seattle Seahawks at Washington Redskins – Game summary

| Quarter | 1 | 2 | 3 | 4 | Total |
|---|---|---|---|---|---|
| Seahawks | 7 | 0 | 0 | 7 | 14 |
| Redskins | 6 | 3 | 7 | 3 | 19 |

at RFK Stadium, Washington, D.C.

- Date: September 28
- Game time: 1:00 pm local
- Game weather: cloudy, 67 °F (19 °C), 90% humidity, wind SE 6 miles per hour (9.7 km/h)
- Game attendance: 54,157
- Referee: Pat Haggerty
- TV announcers (NBC): Charlie Jones and Jimmy Cefalo
- Gamebook

Game information

First quarter

- SEA – Curt Warner 2-yard run (Norm Johnson kick), 10:05 (SEA 7–0)
- WAS – George Rogers 24-yard run (PAT failed), 5:21 (SEA 7–6)

Second quarter

- WAS – Steve Cox 57-yard field goal, 0:12 (WAS 9–7)

Third quarter

- WAS – George Rogers 7-yard run (Mark Moseley kick), 1:25 (WAS 16–7)

Fourth quarter

- WAS – Mark Moseley 36-yard field goal, 8:14 (WAS 19–7)
- SEA – Steve Largent 11-yard pass from Dave Krieg (Norm Johnson kick), 1:50 (WAS 19–14)

Top passers

- SEA – Dave Krieg: 19/32, 219 yds, 1 TD, 2 INT
- WAS – Jay Schroeder: 14/26, 195 yds

Top rushers

- SEA – Curt Warner: 16 car, 106 yds, 1 TD
- WAS – George Rogers: 25 car, 115 yds, 2 TD

Top receivers

- SEA – Byron Franklin: 5 rec, 79 yds
- WAS – Art Monk: 5 rec, 103 yds

Team – pass – rush – total – to

- SEA – 213 – 148 – 361 – 2
- WAS – 195 – 162 – 357 – 1

==== Week 5: vs. San Diego Chargers ====
Week Five: Seattle Seahawks vs. San Diego Chargers – Game summary

| Quarter | 1 | 2 | 3 | 4 | Total |
|---|---|---|---|---|---|
| Chargers | 7 | 0 | 0 | 0 | 7 |
| Seahawks | 0 | 6 | 17 | 10 | 33 |

at Kingdome, Seattle

- Date: October 6
- Game time: 6:07 pm local
- Game weather: indoors
- Game attendance: 63,207
- Referee: Red Cashion
- TV announcers (ABC): Frank Gifford and O. J. Simpson
- Gamebook

Game information

First quarter

- SD – Buford McGee 1-yard run (Rolf Benirschke kick), 7:32 (SD 7–0)

Second quarter

- SEA – Norm Johnson 29-yard field goal, 13:49 (SD 7–3)
- SEA – Norm Johnson 30-yard field goal, 0:35 (SD 7–6)

Third quarter

- SEA – Norm Johnson 54-yard field goal, 10:36 (SEA 9–7)
- SEA – Byron Franklin 46-yard pass from Dave Krieg (Norm Johnson kick), 9:04 (SEA 16–7)
- SEA – Steve Largent 15-yard pass from Dave Krieg (Norm Johnson kick), 8:51 (SEA 23–7)

Fourth quarter

- SEA – Eric Lane 2-yard pass from Dave Krieg (Norm Johnson kick), 12:39 (SEA 30–7)
- SEA – Norm Johnson 20-yard field goal, 7:12 (SEA 33–7)

Top passers

- SD – Dan Fouts: 20/31, 231 yds, 3 INT
- SEA – Dave Krieg: 21/35, 284 yds, 3 TD, 2 INT

Top rushers

- SD – Lionel James: 10 car, 27 yds
- SEA – Curt Warner: 28 car, 142 yds

Top receivers

- SD – Wes Chandler: 3 rec, 61 yds
- SEA – Byron Franklin: 5 rec, 118 yds, 1 TD

Team – pass – rush – total – to

- SD – 222 – 49 – 271 – 5
- SEA – 294 – 218 – 512 – 3

==== Week 6: at Los Angeles Raiders ====
Week Six: Seattle Seahawks at Los Angeles Raiders – Game summary

| Quarter | 1 | 2 | 3 | 4 | Total |
|---|---|---|---|---|---|
| Seahawks | 0 | 3 | 7 | 0 | 10 |
| Raiders | 7 | 7 | 0 | 0 | 14 |

at Los Angeles Memorial Coliseum, Los Angeles

- Date: October 12
- Game time: 1:02 pm local
- Game weather: hazy, 78 °F (26 °C), 71% humidity, wind W 3 miles per hour (4.8 km/h)
- Game attendance: 70,635
- Referee: Chuck Heberling
- TV announcers (NBC): Dick Enberg and Merlin Olsen
- Gamebook

Game information

First quarter

- LA – Dokie Williams 9-yard pass from Jim Plunkett (Chris Bahr kick), 1:17 (LA 7–0)

Second quarter

- LA – Jessie Hester 49-yard pass from Jim Plunkett (Chris Bahr kick), 10:47 (LA 14–0)
- SEA – Norm Johnson 30-yard field goal, 1:56 (LA 14–3)

Third quarter

- SEA – Curt Warner 1-yard run (Norm Johnson kick), 7:43 (LA 14–10)

Fourth quarter

  - No scoring plays

Top passers

- SEA – Dave Krieg: 17/26, 152 yds
- LA – Jim Plunkett: 15/26, 199 yds, 2 TD, 1 INT

Top rushers

- SEA – Curt Warner: 19 car, 74 yds, 1 TD
- LA – Napoleon McCallum: 20 car, 75 yds

Top receivers

- SEA – Steve Largent: 4 rec, 60 yds
- LA – Jessie Hester: 2 rec, 68 yds, 1 TD

Team – pass – rush – total – to

- SEA – 120 – 91 – 211 – 0
- LA – 185 – 138 – 323 – 2

==== Week 7: vs. New York Giants ====
Week Seven: Seattle Seahawks vs. New York Giants – Game summary

| Quarter | 1 | 2 | 3 | 4 | Total |
|---|---|---|---|---|---|
| Giants | 0 | 9 | 0 | 3 | 12 |
| Seahawks | 7 | 0 | 3 | 7 | 17 |

at Kingdome, Seattle

- Date: October 19
- Game time: 1:02 pm local
- Game weather: indoors
- Game attendance: 62,282
- Referee: Gene Barth
- TV announcers (CBS): Pat Summerall & John Madden
- Gamebook

Game information

First quarter

- SEA – Gordon Hudson 16-yard pass from Dave Krieg (Norm Johnson kick), 7:51 (SEA 7–0)

Second quarter

- NYG – Solomon Miller 32-yard pass from Phil Simms (PAT failed), 11:50 (SEA 7–6)
- NYG – Raul Allegre 23-yard field goal, 0:41 (NYG 9–6)

Third quarter

- SEA – Norm Johnson 25-yard field goal, 7:03 (SEA 10–9)

Fourth quarter

- SEA – Curt Warner 1-yard run (Norm Johnson kick), 10:00 (SEA 17–9)
- NYG – Raul Allegre 31-yard field goal, 4:42 (SEA 17–12)

Top passers

- NYG – Phil Simms: 14/25, 190 yds, 1 TD, 4 INT
- SEA – Dave Krieg: 15/22, 166 yds, 1 TD, 1 INT

Top rushers

- NYG – Joe Morris: 24 car, 116 yds
- SEA – Curt Warner: 19 car, 56 yds, 1 TD

Top receivers

- NYG – Phil McConkey: 3 rec, 49 yds
- NYG – Bobby Johnson: 3 rec, 49 yds
- SEA – Byron Franklin: 2 rec, 46 yds

Team – pass – rush – total – to

- NYG – 145 – 162 – 307 – 4
- SEA – 146 – 72 – 218 – 2

==== Week 8: at Denver Broncos ====
Week Eight: Seattle Seahawks at Denver Broncos – Game summary

| Quarter | 1 | 2 | 3 | 4 | Total |
|---|---|---|---|---|---|
| Seahawks | 0 | 3 | 3 | 7 | 13 |
| Broncos | 10 | 3 | 0 | 7 | 20 |

at Mile High Stadium, Denver, Colorado

- Date: October 26
- Game time: 2:00 pm local
- Game weather: clear, 66 °F (19 °C), 22% humidity, wind N 7 miles per hour (11 km/h)
- Game attendance: 76,089
- Referee: Gordon McCarter
- TV announcers (NBC): Dick Enberg and Merlin Olsen
- Gamebook

Game information

First quarter

- DEN – Rich Karlis 22-yard field goal, 9:34 (DEN 3–0)
- DEN – Sammy Winder 1-yard run (Rich Karlis kick), 0:26 (DEN 10–0)

Second quarter

- DEN – Rich Karlis 47-yard field goal, 4:58 (DEN 13–0)
- SEA – Norm Johnson 43-yard field goal, 3:04 (DEN 13–3)

Third quarter

- SEA – Norm Johnson 53-yard field goal, 9:19 (DEN 13–6)

Fourth quarter

- DEN – Vance Johnson 34-yard pass from John Elway (Rich Karlis kick), 10:34 (DEN 20–6)
- SEA – Steve Largent 24-yard pass from Gale Gilbert (Norm Johnson kick), 1:48 (DEN 20–13)

Top passers

- SEA – Gale Gilbert: 4/4, 71 yds, 1 TD
- DEN – John Elway: 18/32, 321 yds, 1 TD, 1 INT

Top rushers

- SEA – Curt Warner: 21 car, 139 yds
- DEN – Sammy Winder: 18 car, 83 yds, 1 TD

Top receivers

- SEA – Byron Franklin: 2 rec, 41 yds
- DEN – Mark Jackson: 3 rec, 84 yds

Team – pass – rush – total – to

- SEA – 50 – 164 – 214 – 0
- DEN – 332 – 118 – 450 – 2

==== Week 9: vs. New York Jets ====
Week Nine: Seattle Seahawks vs. New York Jets – Game summary

| Quarter | 1 | 2 | 3 | 4 | Total |
|---|---|---|---|---|---|
| Jets | 3 | 21 | 7 | 7 | 38 |
| Seahawks | 7 | 0 | 0 | 0 | 7 |

at Kingdome, Seattle

- Date: November 2
- Game time: 1:02 pm local
- Game weather: indoors
- Game attendance: 62,497
- Referee: Tom Dooley
- TV announcers (NBC): Marv Albert and Bob Griese
- Gamebook

Game information

First quarter

- NYJ – Pat Leahy 50-yard field goal, 4:35 (NYJ 3–0)
- SEA – Daryl Turner 27-yard pass from Gale Gilbert (Norm Johnson kick), 0:48 (SEA 7–3)

Second quarter

- NYJ – Al Toon 50-yard pass from Ken O'Brien (Pat Leahy kick), 12:00 (NYJ 10–7)
- NYJ – Wesley Walker 83-yard pass from Ken O'Brien (Pat Leahy kick), 9:30 (NYJ 17–7)
- NYJ – Freeman McNeil 9-yard run (Pat Leahy kick), 5:20 (NYJ 24–7)

Third quarter

- NYJ – Al Toon 36-yard pass from Ken O'Brien (Pat Leahy kick), 8:41 (NYJ 31–7)

Fourth quarter

- NYJ – Mickey Shuler 1-yard pass from Ken O'Brien (Pat Leahy kick), 13:33 (NYJ 38–7)

Top passers

- NYJ – Ken O'Brien: 26/32, 431 yds, 4 TD
- SEA – Gale Gilbert: 25/44, 274 yds, 1 TD, 2 INT

Top rushers

- NYJ – Freeman McNeil: 25 car, 84 yds, 1 TD
- SEA – Curt Warner: 9 car, 31 yds

Top receivers

- NYJ – Al Toon: 9 rec, 195 yds, 2 TD
- SEA – Steve Largent: 7 rec, 108 yds

Team – pass – rush – total – to

- NYJ – 427 – 126 – 553 – 0
- SEA – 271 – 51 – 322 – 3

==== Week 10: at Kansas City Chiefs ====
Week Ten: Seattle Seahawks at Kansas City Chiefs – Game summary

| Quarter | 1 | 2 | 3 | 4 | Total |
|---|---|---|---|---|---|
| Seahawks | 0 | 0 | 0 | 7 | 7 |
| Chiefs | 0 | 17 | 7 | 3 | 27 |

at Arrowhead Stadium, Kansas City, Missouri

- Date: November 9
- Game time: 1:00 pm local
- Game weather: clear, 40 °F (4 °C), 52% humidity, wind NW 7 miles per hour (11 km/h)
- Game attendance: 53,268
- Referee: Jerry Markbreit
- TV announcers (NBC): Len Berman and Dave Rowe
- Gamebook

Game information

First quarter

- No scoring plays

Second quarter

- KC – Walt Arnold 2-yard pass from Bill Kenney (Nick Lowery kick), 13:40 (KC 7–0)
- KC – Nick Lowery 35-yard field goal, 5:51 (KC 10–7)
- KC – Stephone Paige 8-yard pass from Bill Kenney (Nick Lowery kick), 1:00 (KC 17–7)

Third quarter

- KC – Carlos Carson 25-yard pass from Bill Kenney (Nick Lowery kick), 9:54 (KC 24–7)

Fourth quarter

- KC – Nick Lowery 37yard field goal, 12:12 (KC 27–7)
- SEA – Steve Largent 38-yard pass from Gale Gilbert (Norm Johnson kick), 7:17 (KC 27–7)

Top passers

- SEA – Gale Gilbert: 13/26, 140 yds, 1 TD
- KC – Bill Kenney: 22/41, 256 yds, 3 TD, 3 INT

Top rushers

- SEA – Curt Warner: 11 car, 16 yds
- KC – Larry Moriarty: 11 car, 43 yds

Top receivers

- SEA – Steve Largent: 4 rec, 72 yds, 1 TD
- KC – Stephone Paige: 5 rec, 60 yds, 1 TD

Team – pass – rush – total – to

- SEA – 108 – 25 – 133 – 3
- KC – 248 – 127 – 375 – 4

==== Week 11: at Cincinnati Bengals ====
Week Eleven: Seattle Seahawks at Cincinnati Bengals – Game summary

| Quarter | 1 | 2 | 3 | 4 | Total |
|---|---|---|---|---|---|
| Seahawks | 0 | 0 | 7 | 0 | 7 |
| Bengals | 7 | 3 | 7 | 17 | 34 |

at Riverfront Stadium, Cincinnati, Ohio

- Date: November 16
- Game time: 1:00 pm local
- Game weather: cloudy, 43 °F (6 °C), 85% humidity, wind SW 10 miles per hour (16 km/h)
- Game attendance: 54,410
- Referee: Fred Wyant
- TV announcers (NBC): Don Criqui and Bob Trumpy
- Gamebook

Game information

First quarter

- CIN – Stanley Wilson 2-yard run (Jim Breech kick), 4:10 (CIN 7–0)

Second quarter

- CIN – Jim Breech 37-yard field goal, 8:41 (CIN 10–0)

Third quarter

- SEA – Curt Warner 1-yard run (Norm Johnson kick), 5:02 (CIN 10–7)
- CIN – Eric Kattus 1-yard pass from Boomer Esiason (Jim Breech kick), 1:52 (CIN 17–7)

Fourth quarter

- CIN – Eddie Edwards recovered fumble in end zone (Jim Breech kick), 11:13 (CIN 24–7)
- CIN – Jim Breech 34-yard field goal, 6:32 (CIN 27–7)
- CIN – Louis Breeden 36-yard interception return (Jim Breech kick), 0:27 (CIN 34–7)

Top passers

- SEA – Dave Krieg: 18/28, 168 yds, 1 INT
- CIN – Boomer Esiason: 22/33, 334 yds, 1 TD, 1 INT

Top rushers

- SEA – Curt Warner: 22 car, 94 yds, 1 TD
- CIN – James Brooks: 12 car, 42 yds

Top receivers

- SEA – Steve Largent: 7 rec, 102 yds
- CIN – Eddie Brown: 6 rec, 97 yds

Team – pass – rush – total – to

- SEA –127 – 179 – 306 – 5
- CIN – 320 – 105 – 425 – 4

==== Week 12: vs. Philadelphia Eagles ====
Week Twelve: Seattle Seahawks vs. Philadelphia Eagles – Game summary

| Quarter | 1 | 2 | 3 | 4 | Total |
|---|---|---|---|---|---|
| Eagles | 3 | 3 | 7 | 7 | 20 |
| Seahawks | 7 | 14 | 0 | 3 | 24 |

at Kingdome, Seattle

- Date: November 23
- Game time: 1:01 pm local
- Game weather: indoors
- Game attendance: 55,786
- Referee: Ben Dreith
- TV announcers (CBS): Jack Buck & Joe Theismann
- Gamebook

Game information

First quarter

- PHI – Paul McFadden 35-yard field goal, 3:18 (PHI 3–0)
- SEA – Daryl Turner 72-yard pass from Dave Krieg (Norm Johnson kick), 0:49 (SEA 7–3)

Second quarter

- PHI – Paul McFadden 32-yard field goal, 3:48 (SEA 7–6)
- SEA – Eric Lane 12-yard blocked punt return (Norm Johnson kick), 1:13 (SEA 14–6)
- SEA – bobby joe edmonds 75-yard punt return (Norm Johnson kick), 0:11 (SEA 21–6)

Third quarter

- PHI – Kenny Jackson 7-yard pass from Randall Cunningham (Paul McFadden kick), 4:46 (SEA 21–13)

Fourth quarter

- PHI – Kenny Jackson 9-yard pass from Randall Cunningham (Paul McFadden kick), 8:18 (SEA 21–20)
- SEA – Norm Johnson 35-yard field goal, 1:52 (SEA 24–20)

Top passers

- PHI – Randall Cunningham: 22/37, 215 yds, 2 TD
- SEA – Dave Krieg: 14/26, 288 yds, 1 TD

Top rushers

- PHI – Randall Cunningham: 8 car, 63 yds
- SEA – Curt Warner: 13 car, 33 yds

Top receivers

- PHI – Anthony Toney: 5 rec, 68 yds
- SEA – Daryl Turner: 1 rec, 72 yds, 1 TD

Team – pass – rush – total – to

- PHI – 182 – 142 – 324 – 0
- SEA – 260 – 80 – 340 – 3

==== Week 13: at Dallas Cowboys ====
Week Thirteen: Seattle Seahawks vs. Dallas Cowboys – Game summary

| Quarter | 1 | 2 | 3 | 4 | Total |
|---|---|---|---|---|---|
| Seahawks | 7 | 17 | 0 | 7 | 31 |
| Cowboys | 7 | 0 | 7 | 0 | 14 |

at Texas Stadium, Irving, Texas

- Date: November 27
- Game time: 1:00 pm local
- Game weather: partly cloudy, 50 °F (10 °C), 61% humidity, wind N 13 miles per hour (21 km/h)
- Game attendance: 58,020
- Referee: Bob McElwee
- TV announcers (NBC): Dick Enberg, Merlin Olsen, and Bob Griese
- Gamebook

Game information

First quarter

- DAL – Tony Dorsett 8-yard run (Rafael Septién kick), 5:57 (DAL 7–0)
- SEA – Dave Krieg 4-yard run (Norm Johnson kick), 0:41 (Tied 7–7)

Second quarter

- SEA – Steve Largent 11-yard pass from Dave Krieg (Norm Johnson kick), 7:04 (SEA 14–7)
- SEA – Byron Franklin 19-yard pass from Dave Krieg (Norm Johnson kick), 1:56 (SEA 21–7)
- SEA – Norm Johnson 42-yard field goal, 0:08 (SEA 24–7)

Third quarter

- DAL – Herschel Walker 1-yard run (Rafael Septien kick), 6:54 (SEA 24–14)

Fourth quarter

- SEA – Curt Warner 9-yard run (Norm Johnson kick), 10:06 (SEA 31–14)

Top passers

- SEA – Dave Krieg: 16/24, 214 yds, 2 TD, 1 INT
- DAL – Steve Pelluer: 22/36, 210 yds

Top rushers

- SEA – Curt Warner: 22 car, 122 yds, 1 TD
- DAL – Tony Dorsett: 14 car, 59 yds, 1 TD

Top receivers

- SEA – Steve Largent: 3 rec, 75 yds, 1 TD
- DAL – Mike Sherrard: 4 rec, 61 yds

Team – pass – rush – total – to

- SEA – 214 – 201 – 415 – 1
- DAL – 201 – 127 – 328 – 1

==== Week 14: vs. Los Angeles Raiders ====
Week Fourteen: Seattle Seahawks vs. Los Angeles Raiders – Game summary

| Quarter | 1 | 2 | 3 | 4 | Total |
|---|---|---|---|---|---|
| Raiders | 0 | 0 | 0 | 0 | 0 |
| Seahawks | 14 | 10 | 6 | 7 | 37 |

at Kingdome, Seattle

- Date: December 8
- Game time: 6:05 pm local
- Game weather: indoors
- Game attendance: 62,923
- Referee: Dick Jorgensen
- TV announcers (ABC): Al Michaels and Frank Gifford
- Gamebook

Game information

First quarter

- SEA – Steve Largent 10-yard pass from Dave Krieg (Norm Johnson kick), 6:08 (SEA 7–0)
- SEA – Curt Warner 5-yard run (Norm Johnson kick), 2:59 (SEA 14–0)

Second quarter

- SEA – Norm Johnson 46-yard field goal, 4:17 (SEA 17–0)
- SEA – Ray Butler 12-yard pass from Dave Krieg (Norm Johnson kick), 0:45 (SEA 24–0)

Third quarter

- SEA – Norm Johnson 51-yard field goal, 9:13 (SEA 27–0)
- SEA – Norm Johnson 53-yard field goal, 5:09 (SEA 30–0)

Fourth quarter

- SEA – Curt Warner 3-yard run (Norm Johnson kick), 7:31 (SEA 37–0)

Top passers

- LA – Jim Plunkett: 4/11, 61 yds, 1 INT
- SEA – Dave Krieg: 14/21, 243 yds, 2 TD

Top rushers

- LA – Rusty Hilger: 1 car, 16 yds
- SEA – Curt Warner: 23 car, 116 yds, 2 TD

Top receivers

- LA – Todd Christensen: 3 rec, 50 yds
- SEA – Steve Largent: 5 rec, 76 yds, 1 TD

Team – pass – rush – total – to

- LA – 98 – 40 – 138 – 3
- SEA – 224 – 183 – 407 – 1

==== Week 15: at San Diego Chargers ====
Week Fifteen: Seattle Seahawks at San Diego Chargers – Game summary

| Quarter | 1 | 2 | 3 | 4 | Total |
|---|---|---|---|---|---|
| Seahawks | 10 | 7 | 3 | 14 | 34 |
| Chargers | 0 | 17 | 0 | 7 | 24 |

at San Diego Stadium, San Diego, California

- Date: December 14
- Game time: 1:00 pm local
- Game weather: high clouds, 64 °F (18 °C), 71% humidity, wind WSW 8 miles per hour (13 km/h)
- Game attendance: 47,096
- Referee: Chuck Heberling
- TV announcers (NBC): Jay Randolph and Dave Rowe
- Gamebook

Game information

First quarter

- SEA – Norm Johnson 29-yard field goal, 9:29 (SEA 3–0)
- SEA – Steve Largent 6-yard pass from Dave Krieg (Norm Johnson kick), 3:44 (SEA 10–0)

Second quarter

- SD – Tim Spencer 1-yard run (Rolf Benirschke kick), 13:38 (SEA 10–7)
- SEA – Daryl Turner 72-yard pass from Dave Krieg (Norm Johnson kick), 13:19 (SEA 17–7)
- SD – Rolf Benirschke 23-yard field goal, 4:14 (SEA 17–10)
- SD – Kellen Winslow 14-yard pass from Dan Fouts (Rolf Benirschke kick), 0:10 (Tied 17–17)

Third quarter

- SEA – Norm Johnson 25-yard field goal, 9:01 (SEA 20–17)

Fourth quarter

- SEA – Steve Largent 23-yard pass from Dave Krieg (Norm Johnson kick), 13:40 (SEA 27–17)
- SD – Tim Spencer 1-yard run (Rolf Benirschke kick), 6:56 (SEA 27–24)
- SEA – Ray Butler 14-yard pass from Dave Krieg (Norm Johnson kick), 2:23 (SEA 34–24)

Top passers

- SEA – Dave Krieg: 15/21, 305 yds, 4 TD
- SD – Dan Fouts: 21/38, 237 yds, 1 TD, 1 INT

Top rushers

- SEA – Curt Warner: 28 car, 93 yds
- SD – Curtis Adams: 18 car, 66 yds

Top receivers

- SEA – Steve Largent: 6 rec, 96 yds, 2 TD
- SD – Kellen Winslow: 8 rec, 105 yds, 1 TD

Team – pass – rush – total – to

- SEA – 286 – 140 – 426 – 0
- SD – 220 – 85 – 305 – 1

==== Week 16: vs. Denver Broncos ====
Week Sixteen: Seattle Seahawks vs. Denver Broncos – Game summary

| Quarter | 1 | 2 | 3 | 4 | Total |
|---|---|---|---|---|---|
| Broncos | 0 | 10 | 3 | 3 | 16 |
| Seahawks | 3 | 17 | 7 | 14 | 41 |

at Kingdome, Seattle

- Date: December 20
- Game time: 1:07 pm local
- Game weather: indoors
- Game attendance: 63,697
- Referee: Red Cashion
- TV announcers (NBC): Dick Enberg and Merlin Olsen
- Gamebook

Game information

First quarter

- SEA – Norm Johnson 37-yard field goal, 6:33 (SEA 3–0)

Second quarter

- SEA – Curt Warner 2-yard run (Norm Johnson kick), 8:49 (SEA 10–0)
- DEN – Rich Karlis 31-yard field goal, 6:14 (SEA 10–3)
- SEA – Norm Johnson 35-yard field goal, 4:22 (SEA 13–3)
- DEN – Orson Mobley 17-yard pass from John Elway (Rich Karlis kick), 1:06 (SEA 13–10)
- SEA – Daryl Turner 16-yard pass from Dave Krieg (Norm Johnson kick), 0:18 (SEA 20–10)

Third quarter

- SEA – Daryl Turner 7-yard pass from Dave Krieg (Norm Johnson kick), 5:14 (SEA 27–10)
- DEN – Rich Karlis 34-yard field goal, 1:00 (SEA 27–13)

Fourth quarter

- DEN – Rich Karlis 47-yard field goal, 14:10 (SEA 27–16)
- SEA – Curt Warner 6-yard run (Norm Johnson kick), 10:51 (SEA 34–16)
- SEA – Curt Warner 60-yard run (Norm Johnson kick), 6:10 (SEA 41–16)

Top passers

- DEN – John Elway: 17/37, 186 yds, 1 TD
- SEA – Dave Krieg: 17/24, 238 yds, 2 TD

Top rushers

- DEN – Gerald Willhite: 7 car, 26 yds
- SEA – Curt Warner: 24 car, 192 yds, 3 TD

Top receivers

- DEN – Steve Watson: 5 rec, 53 yds
- SEA – Steve Largent: 6 rec, 101 yds

Team – pass – rush – total – to

- DEN – 193 – 75 – 268 – 0
- SEA – 238 – 298 – 536 – 1
