= Byron Franklin =

American football player (born 1958)

No. 85, 88
- Position: Wide receiver

Personal information
- Born: September 3, 1958 (age 68); Florence, Alabama, U.S.
- Listed height: 6 ft 1 in (1.85 m)
- Listed weight: 179 lb (81 kg)

Career information
- High school: Sheffield (Sheffield, Alabama)
- College: Auburn
- NFL draft: 1981: 2nd round, 50th overall pick

Career history
- Buffalo Bills (1981–1984); Seattle Seahawks (1985–1987)

Awards and highlights
- Second-team All-SEC (1980)

Career NFL statistics
- Receptions: 145
- Receiving yards: 2,016
- Receiving touchdowns: 10
- Stats at Pro Football Reference

Byron Paul Franklin (born September 3, 1958) is an American former professional football player who was a wide receiver in the National Football League (NFL) for the Buffalo Bills and Seattle Seahawks.

He played college football at Auburn University. A native of Sheffield, Alabama, Franklin starred in football at Auburn from 1976 to 1980 and received a B.S. in vocational and distributive education in 1991. Franklin also competed for the Auburn Tigers track and field team as a sprinter and long jumper.

His professional football career lasted from 1981 to 1987. He served as assistant director of athletic development at AU from 1991 to 1993. Appointed to the AU Board of Trustees by Gov. Don Siegelman, Franklin represented the 9th District from 1999 to 2012. During his term, he chaired the university Student Affairs committee. He now hopes to see success in his 2 youngest children, Bradley Milton Franklin and Brandon Welsey Franklin.

== NFL career statistics ==
Legend
**Bold**	Career high

Year	Team	Games		Receiving				
Year	Team	GP	GS	Rec	Yds	Avg	Lng	TD
1981	BUF	13	0	2	29	14.5	16	0
1983	BUF	15	5	30	452	15.1	43	**4**
1984	BUF	**16**	**16**	**69**	**862**	12.5	**64**	**4**
1985	SEA	13	0	10	119	11.9	28	0
1986	SEA	14	1	33	547	**16.6**	49	2
1987	SEA	6	0	1	7	7.0	7	0
		77	22	145	2,016	13.9	64	10
