= Paul Coffman =

American football player (born 1956)

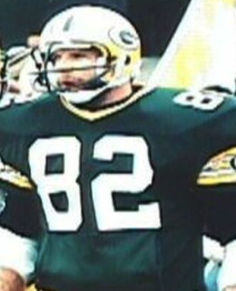

No. 82, 84, 89
- Position: Tight end

Personal information
- Born: March 29, 1956 (age 70); St. Louis, Missouri, U.S.
- Listed height: 6 ft 3 in (1.91 m)
- Listed weight: 222 lb (101 kg)

Career information
- College: Kansas State
- NFL draft: 1978: undrafted

Career history
- Green Bay Packers (1978–1985); Kansas City Chiefs (1986–1987); Minnesota Vikings (1988)

Awards and highlights
- 3× Pro Bowl (1982–1984); Green Bay Packers Hall of Fame (1994)

Career NFL statistics
- Receptions: 339
- Receiving yards: 4,340
- Receiving touchdowns: 42
- Stats at Pro Football Reference

Paul Randolph Coffman (born March 29, 1956) is an American former professional football player who was a tight end for 11 seasons with the Green Bay Packers, Kansas City Chiefs, and Minnesota Vikings of the National Football League (NFL). After attending high school in Chase, Kansas, he played college football for the Kansas State Wildcats, joining as a walk-on and playing tight end for four years. After completing college, Coffman became an undrafted free agent and joined the Packers. He was a three-time Pro Bowl selection. In 1994, he was inducted into the Green Bay Packers Hall of Fame.

== NFL career statistics ==
Legend
**Bold**	Career high

=== Regular season ===
Year	Team	Games		Receiving				
Year	Team	GP	GS	Rec	Yds	Avg	Lng	TD
1978	GNB	**16**	0	0	0	0.0	0	0
1979	GNB	**16**	**16**	**56**	711	12.7	**78**	4
1980	GNB	**16**	**16**	42	496	11.8	25	3
1981	GNB	**16**	**16**	55	687	12.5	29	4
1982	GNB	9	9	23	287	12.5	42	2
1983	GNB	**16**	**16**	54	**814**	**15.1**	74	**11**
1984	GNB	14	13	43	562	13.1	44	9
1985	GNB	**16**	**16**	49	666	13.6	32	6
1986	KAN	15	0	12	75	6.3	10	2
1987	KAN	12	1	5	42	8.4	13	1
1988	MIN	8	0	0	0	0.0	0	0
		154	103	339	4,340	12.8	78	42

=== Playoffs ===
Year	Team	Games		Receiving				
Year	Team	GP	GS	Rec	Yds	Avg	Lng	TD
1982	GNB	**2**	**2**	**9**	**111**	**12.3**	**23**	0
1986	KAN	1	0	3	12	4.0	6	0
		3	2	12	123	10.3	23	0

== Personal life ==
His son, Chase, was an all star tight end for the University of Missouri and last played with the Indianapolis Colts until he was released in 2016. His son, Carson, was the starting quarterback for Kansas State University in the 2010 season and most recently played arena football. His third son, Cameron, is transferring from the Indiana University Hoosiers to the University of Wyoming. His only daughter, Camille, is attending the University of Wyoming on a full scholarship for volleyball.
