= Boyce Green =

American football player (born 1960)

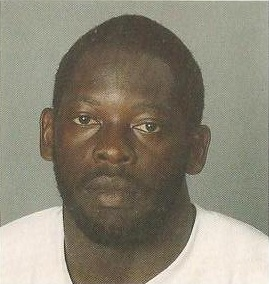
- Green in 1985

No. 30, 40
- Position: Running back

Personal information
- Born: June 24, 1960 (age 66); Beaufort, South Carolina, U.S.
- Listed height: 5 ft 11 in (1.80 m)
- Listed weight: 215 lb (98 kg)

Career information
- High school: Beaufort
- College: Carson-Newman
- NFL draft: 1983: 11th round, 288th overall pick

Career history
- Cleveland Browns (1983–1985); Kansas City Chiefs (1986); Seattle Seahawks (1987)

Career NFL statistics
- Rushing yards: 1,561
- Average: 3.7
- Rushing touchdowns: 6
- Stats at Pro Football Reference

Boyce Keith Green (born June 24, 1960) is an American former professional football player who was a running back in the National Football League (NFL). He was selected 288th overall by the Cleveland Browns in the 11th round of the 1983 NFL draft. He played college football for the Carson–Newman Eagles. Green also played for the Kansas City Chiefs and Seattle Seahawks.
