= Dokie Williams =

American football player (born 1960)

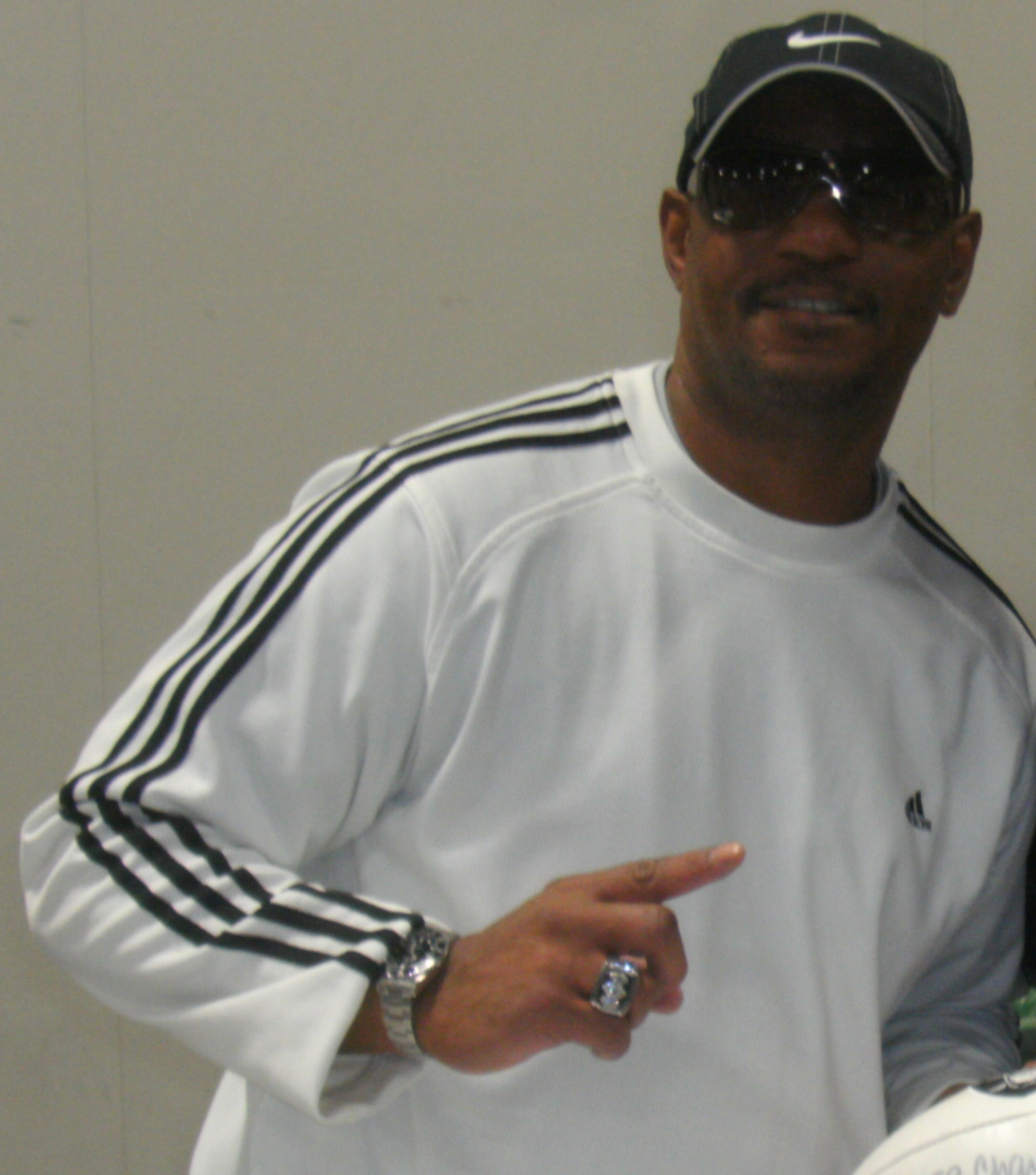
- Williams in 2011

No. 85
- Position: Wide receiver

Personal information
- Born: August 25, 1960 (age 66); Oceanside, California, U.S.
- Listed height: 5 ft 11 in (1.80 m)
- Listed weight: 180 lb (82 kg)

Career information
- High school: El Camino (Oceanside)
- College: UCLA
- NFL draft: 1983: 5th round, 138th overall pick

Career history
- Los Angeles Raiders (1983–1987); San Francisco 49ers (1988)*; San Diego Chargers (1989)*; Seattle Seahawks (1990)*
- * Offseason or practice squad member only

Awards and highlights
- Super Bowl champion (XVIII)

Career NFL statistics
- Receptions: 148
- Receiving yards: 2,866
- Receiving touchdowns: 25
- Stats at Pro Football Reference

Darryl Eugene "Dokie" Williams (born August 25, 1960) is an American former professional football player who was a wide receiver in the National Football League (NFL) for five seasons with the Los Angeles Raiders from 1983 to 1987. He played college football for the UCLA Bruins.

== Early life ==
At El Camino High School in Oceanside, California, Williams was a top football and track and field athlete. He was the CIF California State Meet champion in the triple jump in 1977. In 1978, he repeated in the triple jump and added the long jump title while also finishing fourth in the 100 yard dash.

== College career ==
Williams began his career at the University of California, Los Angeles, where he was a wide receiver and lettered in football in all four years. Williams graduated in 1983. He also participated on the track and field team, where he is number two in the triple jump on the team's all-time list behind former world record holder (and Oceanside product) Willie Banks.

== Professional career ==
Williams was selected by the Los Angeles Raiders with the 138th pick in the fifth round of the 1983 NFL draft. He played five seasons in the NFL, all of which with the Raiders. Williams won a Super Bowl ring with the Raiders in 1983. After the 1987 season, he requested to be traded.

On April 24, 1988, the Raiders traded Williams and their 1988 second- and fourth-round draft picks to the San Francisco 49ers in exchange for the 49ers 1988 first-round selection (No. 26 overall). He was waived by the 49ers on August 26, 1988.

He signed with the San Diego Chargers on May 11, 1989. He was released on September 5, 1989.

Williams was signed by the Seattle Seahawks on April 24, 1990 but was later released on August 26, 1990.

== Personal life ==
Williams is now one of the girl's varsity coaches at Escondido High School, along with his older brother Cris Williams.

== NFL career statistics ==
Legend
	Won the Super Bowl
**Bold**	Career high

=== Regular season ===
Year	Team	Games		Receiving				
Year	Team	GP	GS	Rec	Yds	Avg	Lng	TD
1983	RAI	16	0	14	259	18.5	50	3
1984	RAI	16	2	22	509	**23.1**	**75**	4
1985	RAI	16	16	**48**	**925**	19.3	55	5
1986	RAI	15	15	43	843	19.6	53	**8**
1987	RAI	11	5	21	330	15.7	33	5
		74	38	148	2,866	19.4	75	25

=== Playoffs ===
Year	Team	Games		Receiving				
Year	Team	GP	GS	Rec	Yds	Avg	Lng	TD
1983	RAI	2	0	0	0	0.0	0	0
1984	RAI	1	0	0	0	0.0	0	0
1985	RAI	1	1	**3**	**33**	**11.0**	**14**	0
		4	1	3	33	11.0	14	0
