= Gale Gilbert =

American football player (born 1961)

No. 7, 13
- Position: Quarterback

Personal information
- Born: December 20, 1961 (age 64); Red Bluff, California, U.S.
- Listed height: 6 ft 3 in (1.91 m)
- Listed weight: 209 lb (95 kg)

Career information
- High school: Red Bluff
- College: California (1980–1984)
- NFL draft: 1985: undrafted

Career history
- Seattle Seahawks (1985–1987); Buffalo Bills (1989–1993); San Diego Chargers (1994–1995)

Awards and highlights
- Second-team All-Pac-10 (1984)

Career NFL statistics
- Passing attempts: 259
- Passing completions: 146
- Completion percentage: 56.4%
- Passing yards: 1,544
- TD–INT: 9-12
- Passer rating: 66.2
- Stats at Pro Football Reference

Gale Reed Gilbert (born December 20, 1961) is an American former professional football player who was a quarterback for 10 seasons in the National Football League (NFL). He played college football for the California Golden Bears. Gilbert played in the NFL for the Seattle Seahawks, Buffalo Bills, and San Diego Chargers. He is the only player in NFL history to be on five consecutive Super Bowl teams, all of which, incidentally, lost.

== Early life ==
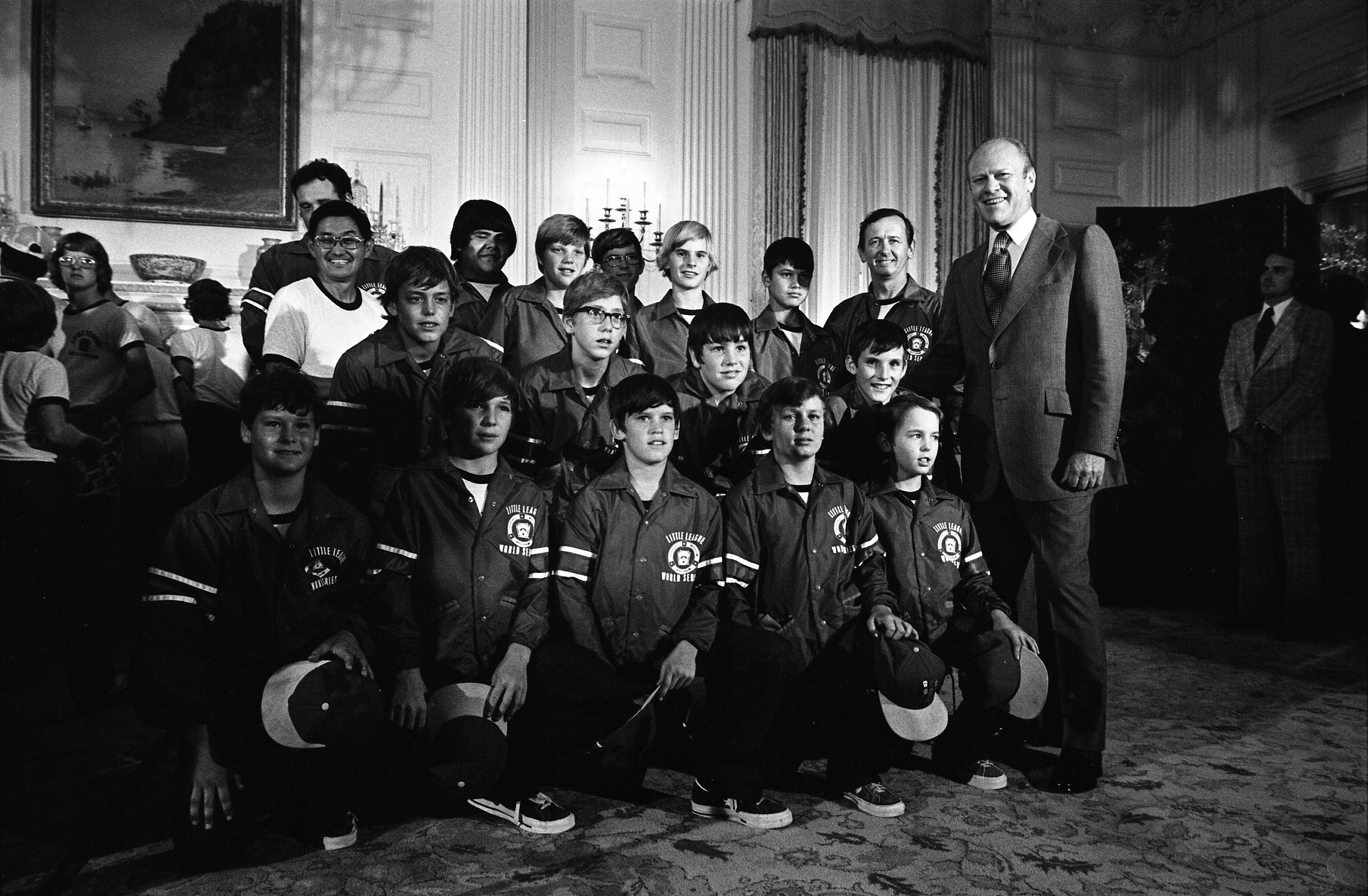
Red Bluff Little League team with President Gerald Ford in 1974

Gilbert was born and raised in Red Bluff, California. At age twelve, he was the catcher for a baseball team that advanced to the 1974 Little League World Series in Williamsport, Pennsylvania. They lost the nationally televised championship game to a team from Taiwan.

Gilbert played college football at the University of California, Berkeley, for the Golden Bears under head coach Joe Kapp. As a sophomore in 1982, he was the starter for the Bears in their Big Game against Stanford, led by quarterback John Elway. Down by a point with four seconds remaining, The Play occurred, in which California executed five laterals on a kickoff return that scored the winning touchdown, through the Stanford Band.

Gilbert was named overall MVP of the January 13, 1985, Japan Bowl, a college football all-star game. In the game at Yokohama Stadium, Gilbert completed 16 of 25 passes for 140 yards and outdueled Heisman Trophy-winner Doug Flutie. Gilbert's teammate Wisconsin's Darryl Sims was named the game's defensive MVP.

== Professional career ==
=== Seattle Seahawks ===
Gilbert was signed by the Seattle Seahawks as an undrafted free agent in 1985, beginning his career as the third-string quarterback behind Dave Krieg and Jim Zorn. Gilbert became the backup to Krieg when Zorn was released on September 2, 1985. He also became the holder for placekicks, as Zorn's release opened that job up as well. Gilbert threw a 37-yard touchdown pass to Daryl Turner in the final seconds of a game against the Los Angeles Rams on September 23. Against the Kansas City Chiefs on September 29, Gilbert took over at quarterback for Krieg, who threw four interceptions. Gilbert threw an additional interception to end the game. Gilbert played in nine games in 1985, going 19-for-40 for 218 yards, one touchdown and two interceptions.

He played for the Seahawks from 1985 to 1987.

=== Buffalo Bills ===
Gilbert played for the Buffalo Bills from 1989 to 1993, where he was the third-string quarterback, behind Jim Kelly and Frank Reich. In his seasons with Buffalo, Gilbert appeared in only two games and attempted fifteen passes.

=== San Diego Chargers ===
Gilbert played for the San Diego Chargers from 1994 to 1995 where he backed up Stan Humphries. In San Diego, Gilbert saw increased playing time, appearing in 31 games over the course of the two seasons and starting one game each season. In these two seasons, Gilbert attempted 128 passes. He played briefly at the end of the Chargers' loss in Super Bowl XXIX.

Gilbert's career ended on Sunday, December 31, 1995, during San Diego's 35–20 loss to the Indianapolis Colts in the wild card round of the playoffs. Gilbert did not play in his final game on an NFL roster.

Gilbert is the only player in NFL history to be a member of five straight Super Bowl teams; four with the Bills (XXV–XXVIII) and one with the Chargers (XXIX). All five teams lost.

== Personal life ==
On June 1, 1988, Gilbert was found not guilty of second-degree rape and indecent liberties. The accusations were made by a 21-year-old female he met at a bar in Seattle's Ballard neighborhood. Two days after his acquittal, he pled guilty to second-degree attempted sexual assault against a second woman and was subsequently sentenced to 240 hours of community service.

Gilbert's son, Garrett, is a former professional quarterback who was last with the 2022 New England Patriots. He was originally selected by the St. Louis Rams in the sixth round of the 2014 NFL draft. He played college football at Texas and SMU and competed in the 2010 BCS National Championship Game. During his career, Gilbert was a member of the New England Patriots, Detroit Lions, Oakland Raiders, Carolina Panthers, Dallas Cowboys, Las Vegas Raiders, and Orlando Apollos in the Alliance of American Football.

Gilbert is also the father of former Texas Christian University Horned Frogs tight end Griffin Gilbert.
