= Norm Johnson =

American football player (born 1960)

No. 9
- Position: Placekicker

Personal information
- Born: May 31, 1960 (age 66); Inglewood, California, U.S.
- Listed height: 6 ft 2 in (1.88 m)
- Listed weight: 210 lb (95 kg)

Career information
- High school: Pacifica (Garden Grove, California)
- College: UCLA
- NFL draft: 1982: undrafted

Career history
- Seattle Seahawks (1982–1990); Atlanta Falcons (1991–1994); Pittsburgh Steelers (1995–1998); Philadelphia Eagles (1999)

Awards and highlights
- First-team All-Pro (1984); Second-team All-Pro (1993); 2× Pro Bowl (1984, 1993); 2× PFW Golden Toe Award (1984, 1993); Seattle Seahawks 35th Anniversary Team

Career NFL statistics
- Field goals: 366 / 477 (.767)
- Extra points: 638 / 644 (.991)
- Points scored: 1,736
- Stats at Pro Football Reference

Norman Douglas Johnson (born May 31, 1960) is an American former professional football player who was a placekicker for 18 seasons in the National Football League (NFL). During that time, he played for the Seattle Seahawks (1982–90), Atlanta Falcons (1991–1994), Pittsburgh Steelers (1995–98), and the Philadelphia Eagles (1999). Johnson played college football for the UCLA Bruins.

Johnson finished his 18 NFL seasons with 366 of 477 field goals (76%) and 638 of 644 extra points (99%), giving him a total of 1,736 points. Currently, Johnson has the 12th most points in NFL history, as well as the 8th most extra points made and the 15th most field goals made., Johnson's performance earned him the enduring nickname "Mr. Automatic" received during his tenure with the Seattle Seahawks. In 1993, while with the Atlanta Falcons, Johnson led the league in field goal percentage (96.3%), making 26 out of 27 field goal attempts.

Johnson's best season was in 1995, when he led the NFL in field goals made (34) and attempted (41), while also successfully kicking all 39 of his extra point attempts. He then assisted the Steelers to Super Bowl XXX by kicking four field goals in their 40-21 divisional playoff win over the Buffalo Bills and two field goals in their 20–16 win over the Indianapolis Colts in the AFC title game. He also kicked a 46-yard field goal in the Steelers' 27-17 Super Bowl loss to the Dallas Cowboys. Johnson is the only player to have been teammates with the Steelers top two all-time leading rushers, having been teammates with Jerome Bettis in Pittsburgh and Franco Harris during his brief time with the Seahawks.

Johnson's family includes wife Lori, and three sons, Jordan, Jarrett and Jameson.

Johnson graduated in 1983 with a bachelor's degree in economics from the University of California, Los Angeles. After his NFL career, he made his real estate hobby into a profession. He now resides in western Washington state, where he works as a real estate agent.

On December 10, 2007, Johnson rescued a woman who had rolled over her car on icy roads in Kitsap County, Washington. As she struggled to crawl from the partially submerged car, Johnson freed her by breaking out a window with a rock.

== Career regular season statistics ==
Career high/best bolded

Regular season statistics
| Season | Team (record) | G | FGM | FGA | % | <20 | 20-29 | 30-39 | 40-49 | 50+ | LNG | BLK | XPM | XPA | % | PTS |
|---|---|---|---|---|---|---|---|---|---|---|---|---|---|---|---|---|
| 1982 | SEA (4–5) | 9 | 10 | 14 | 71.4 | 0–0 | 3–4 | 5–6 | 2–3 | 0–1 | 48 | 0 | 13 | 14 | 92.9 | 43 |
| 1983 | SEA (9–7) | **16** | 18 | 25 | 72.0 | 1–1 | 4–4 | 4–7 | 8–10 | 1–3 | **54** | 0 | 49 | 50 | 98.0 | 103 |
| 1984 | SEA (12–4) | **16** | 20 | 24 | 83.3 | 0–0 | 9–10 | 4–4 | 6–7 | 1–3 | 50 | 0 | **50** | **51** | 98.0 | 110 |
| 1985 | SEA (8–8) | **16** | 14 | 25 | 56.0 | 0–0 | 5–5 | 7–9 | 1–8 | 1–3 | 51 | 0 | 40 | 41 | 97.6 | 82 |
| 1986 | SEA (10–6) | **16** | 22 | 35 | 62.9 | 0–0 | 6–8 | 8–9 | 3–11 | **5–7** | **54** | 0 | 42 | 42 | **100.0** | 108 |
| 1987 | SEA (9–6) | 13 | 15 | 20 | 75.0 | 0–0 | 7–7 | 4–7 | 4–5 | 0–1 | 49 | 0 | 40 | 40 | **100.0** | 85 |
| 1988 | SEA (9–7) | **16** | 22 | 28 | 78.6 | 1–1 | 4–4 | 7–9 | 10–14 | 0–0 | 47 | 0 | 39 | 39 | **100.0** | 105 |
| 1989 | SEA (7–9) | **16** | 15 | 25 | 60.0 | 1–1 | 6–7 | 3–4 | 4–8 | 1–5 | 50 | 0 | 27 | 27 | **100.0** | 72 |
| 1990 | SEA (9–7) | **16** | 23 | 32 | 71.9 | **2–2** | 7–7 | 8–14 | 5–6 | 1–3 | 51 | 0 | 33 | 34 | 97.1 | 102 |
| 1991 | ATL (10–6) | 14 | 19 | 23 | 82.6 | 0–0 | 9–9 | 4–4 | 5–8 | 1–2 | 50 | 0 | 38 | 39 | 97.4 | 95 |
| 1992 | ATL (6–10) | **16** | 18 | 22 | 81.8 | 0–0 | 6–6 | 4–5 | 4–7 | 4–4 | **54** | 1 | 39 | 39 | **100.0** | 93 |
| 1993 | ATL (6–10) | 15 | 26 | 27 | **96.3** | 1–1 | 7–7 | 9–10 | 7–7 | 2–2 | **54** | 0 | 34 | 34 | **100.0** | 112 |
| 1994 | ATL (7–9) | **16** | 21 | 25 | 84.0 | 0–0 | 9–9 | 7–7 | 4–4 | 1–5 | 50 | 1 | 32 | 32 | **100.0** | 95 |
| 1995 | PIT (11–5) | **16** | **34** | **41** | 82.9 | 1–1 | **10–10** | **14–16** | 8–13 | 1–1 | 50 | 0 | 39 | 39 | **100.0** | **141** |
| 1996 | PIT (10–6) | **16** | 23 | 30 | 76.7 | 0–0 | 10–12 | 8–10 | 5–7 | 0–1 | 49 | **3** | 37 | 37 | **100.0** | 106 |
| 1997 | PIT (11–5) | **16** | 22 | 25 | 88.0 | 1–1 | 6–6 | 8–8 | 6–8 | 1–2 | 52 | 1 | 40 | 40 | **100.0** | 106 |
| 1998 | PIT (7–9) | 15 | 26 | 31 | 83.9 | 0–0 | **10–10** | 5–5 | **11–14** | 0–2 | 49 | 1 | 21 | 21 | **100.0** | 99 |
| 1999 | PHI (5–11) | 15 | 18 | 25 | 72.0 | 0–0 | 8–9 | 5–8 | 5–6 | 0–2 | 49 | 1 | 25 | 25 | **100.0** | 79 |
| Career (18 seasons) | | 273 | 366 | 477 | 76.7 | 8–8 | 126–134 | 114–142 | 98–146 | 20–47 | 54 | 8 | 638 | 644 | 99.1 | 1736 |
