= Jessie Hester =

American football player (born 1963)

No. 84, 89, 86
- Position: Wide receiver

Personal information
- Born: January 21, 1963 (age 63); Belle Glade, Florida, U.S.
- Listed height: 5 ft 11 in (1.80 m)
- Listed weight: 175 lb (79 kg)

Career information
- High school: Glades Central (FL)
- College: Florida State
- NFL draft: 1985: 1st round, 23rd overall pick

Career history
- Los Angeles Raiders (1985–1987); Atlanta Falcons (1988–1989); Indianapolis Colts (1990–1993); Los Angeles/St. Louis Rams (1994–1995)

Career NFL statistics
- Receptions: 373
- Receiving yards: 5,850
- Receiving touchdowns: 29
- Stats at Pro Football Reference

Jessie Lee Hester (born January 21, 1963) is an American former professional football player who was a wide receiver for 11 years in the National Football League (NFL). Hester played for the Los Angeles Raiders, Atlanta Falcons, Indianapolis Colts, and the Los Angeles / St. Louis Rams from 1985 to 1995. He played college football at Florida State.

== Early life ==
Hester was a football star at Glades Central High School in Belle Glade, Florida.

== College career ==
He played college football at Florida State University. He was a Second Team All-First Independent in 1982, First Team All-South independent selection in 1984. He finished his college career with 107 catches for 2,100 yards and 21 touchdowns. He was a taken with the 23rd pick in the first round of the 1985 NFL draft.

== Professional career ==
In his career, Hester played in 147 games and caught 373 passes for 5,850 yards and 29 touchdowns.

== NFL career statistics ==
Legend
**Bold**	Career high

=== Regular season ===
Year	Team	Games		Receiving				
Year	Team	GP	GS	Rec	Yds	Avg	Lng	TD
1985	RAI	**16**	**16**	32	665	20.8	59	4
1986	RAI	13	2	23	632	27.5	**81**	**6**
1987	RAI	10	0	1	30	**30.0**	30	0
1988	ATL	**16**	3	12	176	14.7	41	0
1990	IND	**16**	14	54	**924**	17.1	64	**6**
1991	IND	**16**	**16**	60	753	12.6	49	5
1992	IND	**16**	**16**	52	792	15.2	**81**	1
1993	IND	**16**	**16**	**64**	835	13.0	58	1
1994	RAM	**16**	15	45	644	14.3	41	3
1995	STL	12	7	30	399	13.3	38	3
		147	105	373	5,850	15.7	81	29

=== Playoffs ===
Year	Team	Games		Receiving				
Year	Team	GP	GS	Rec	Yds	Avg	Lng	TD
1985	RAI	1	1	1	16	16.0	16	1
		1	1	1	16	16.0	16	1

== Coaching career ==
After retiring from the NFL, Hester returned to Belle Glade, Florida to become the head football coach at his alma mater, Glades Central High School. He also owns a home in Wellington, Florida.

On December 17, 2010, Hester was fired from his position of Head Coach at Glades Central High School after guiding the team to a record of 36–4 over three seasons. Hester had led the Raiders to the playoffs for three consecutive years and appearances in two consecutive state championship games, which they lost. In 2011, he went 3–7 as head football coach at Suncoast High School.

Author Bryan Mealer's book Muck City focuses on Hester's life in Belle Glade and the 2010 Glades Central Raiders team he coached. The book was released in October 2012.

In the spring of 2012, Hester became Athletic Director for Lake Worth Community High School. In December 2012, Hester was named football coach. He was fired after a domestic incident. He returned to coach at Glades Central for a few years afterwards.
