= Jeff Smith (running back) =

American football player (born 1962)

No. 42, 35
- Position: Running back

Personal information
- Born: March 22, 1962 (age 64); Wichita, Kansas, U.S.
- Listed height: 5 ft 9 in (1.75 m)
- Listed weight: 201 lb (91 kg)

Career information
- High school: Wichita Southeast
- College: Nebraska
- NFL draft: 1985: 10th round, 267th overall pick

Career history
- Kansas City Chiefs (1985–1986); Tampa Bay Buccaneers (1987–1988); Green Bay Packers (1989)*
- * Offseason or practice squad member only

Awards and highlights
- First-team All-Big Eight (1984)

Career NFL statistics
- Rushing yards: 752
- Rushing average: 3.7
- Total touchdowns: 12
- Stats at Pro Football Reference

Jeff Keith Smith (born March 22, 1962) is an American former professional football player who was a running back for four seasons with the Kansas City Chiefs and Tampa Bay Buccaneers of the National Football League (NFL). He played college football for the Nebraska Cornhuskers and was selected by the Chiefs in the 10th round in the 1985 NFL draft.

== College career ==
At the University of Nebraska–Lincoln, Smith's career was highlighted by his two touchdowns in the 1984 Orange Bowl including one in the last minute to almost rally the Cornhuskers to a comeback victory against the Miami Hurricanes in what is still thought to be one of the greatest college football games of all time.

== Professional career ==
Smiths most productive season was 1986 with the Chiefs when he gained 1,270 all-purpose yards, 557 of which came returning kickoffs.

== Later life ==
After his NFL career, Smith has pursued a career in the criminal justice system, working as a Court Services Officer in Wichita, Kansas.

== Personal life ==
Smith is the step-father of NFL running back Breece Hall.

== NFL career statistics ==
Legend
**Bold**	Career high

=== Regular season ===
Year	Team	Games		Rushing					Receiving				
Year	Team	GP	GS	Att	Yds	Avg	Lng	TD	Rec	Yds	Avg	Lng	TD
1985	KAN	13	1	30	118	3.9	27	0	18	157	8.7	**45**	2
1986	KAN	15	0	54	238	**4.4**	32	**3**	**33**	**230**	7.0	18	**3**
1987	TAM	12	**8**	**100**	**309**	3.1	**46**	2	20	197	**9.9**	34	2
1988	TAM	**16**	3	20	87	**4.4**	23	0	16	134	8.4	22	0
		56	12	204	752	3.7	46	5	87	718	8.3	45	7

=== Playoffs ===
Year	Team	Games		Rushing					Receiving				
Year	Team	GP	GS	Att	Yds	Avg	Lng	TD	Rec	Yds	Avg	Lng	TD
1986	KAN	1	0	4	12	3.0	6	1	2	12	6.0	6	0
		1	0	4	12	3.0	6	1	2	12	6.0	6	0
