= Nick Lowery =

American football player (born 1956)

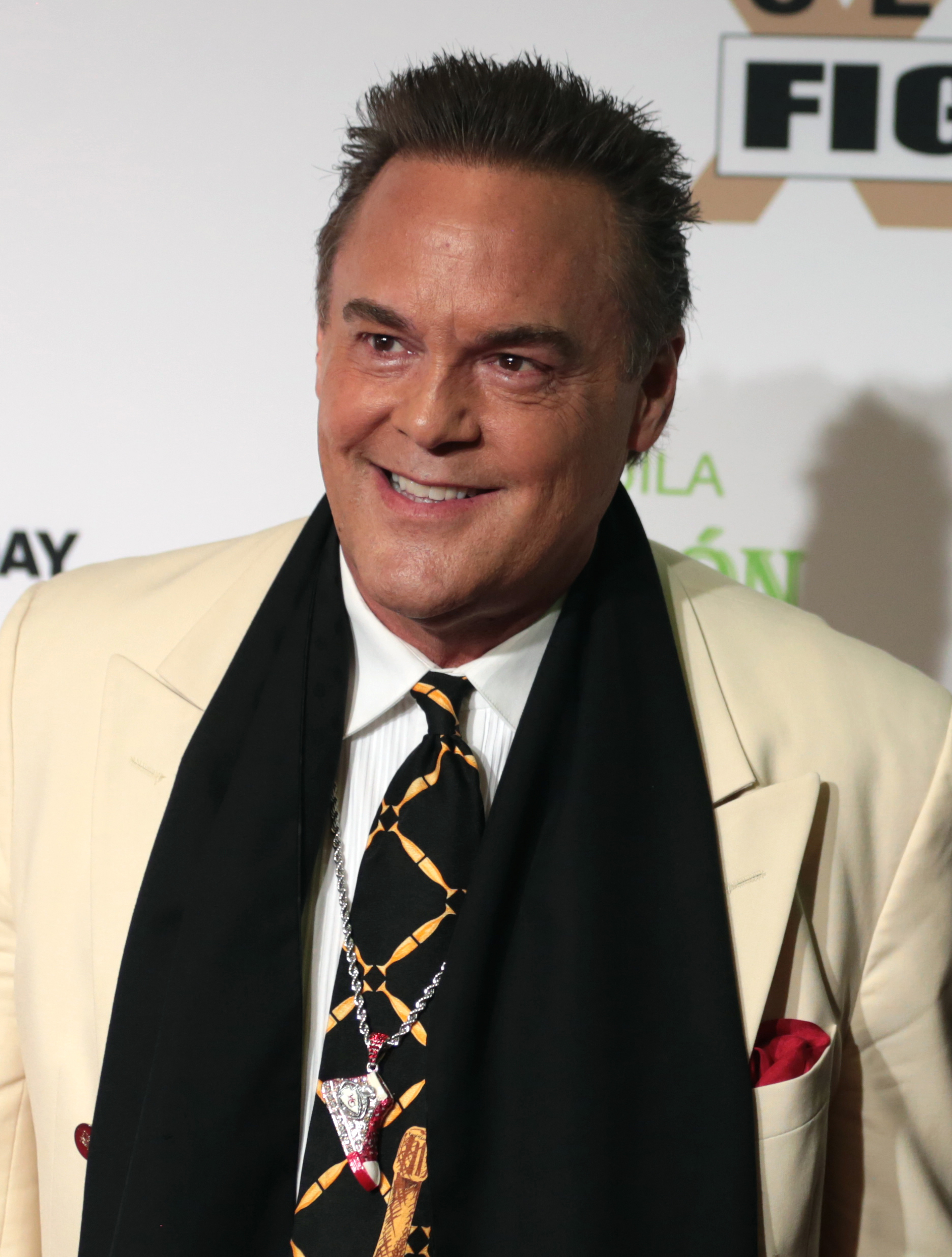
- Lowery in 2018

No. 7, 8
- Position: Kicker

Personal information
- Born: May 27, 1956 (age 70); Munich, West Germany
- Listed height: 6 ft 4 in (1.93 m)
- Listed weight: 215 lb (98 kg)

Career information
- High school: St. Albans (Washington, D.C.)
- College: Dartmouth
- NFL draft: 1978: undrafted

Career history
- New England Patriots (1978); Kansas City Chiefs (1980–1993); New York Jets (1994–1996)

Awards and highlights
- 2× First-team All-Pro (1985, 1990); 3× Pro Bowl (1981, 1990, 1992); NFL scoring leader (1990); "Whizzer" White NFL Man of the Year Award (1993); Kansas City Chiefs Hall of Fame

Career NFL statistics
- Field goals: 383 / 479
- Field goal %: 80
- Extra points: 562 / 568
- Points scored: 1,711
- Stats at Pro Football Reference

Dominic Gerald Lowery (born May 27, 1956) is an American former professional football player who was a kicker in the National Football League (NFL). In his career he played for the New England Patriots, Kansas City Chiefs, and New York Jets. He played college football for the Dartmouth Big Green. Lowery was selected to the Pro Bowl three times and when he retired was ranked first in field goal percentage and also had the most field goals in NFL history. As of 2018 he was 16th on the NFL's list of all-time scoring leaders, and is the Chiefs' all-time leading scorer, with 1,466 points in his 14 seasons with the club.

Lowery was born in Munich, West Germany. His father was an American pilot who served in Germany during World War II and later worked as an analyst for the Department of State, and his mother was British and working in Germany before documenting the death camps after the war. Lowery grew up in McLean, Virginia, and attended St. Albans School in Washington, D.C., where he was a star football player.

He attended Dartmouth College. He has an M.P.A from Harvard's Kennedy School of Government, the first pro athlete to graduate from there.

In 2009 Lowery was inducted into the Kansas City Chiefs Hall of Fame.

His memoir 'Naked and Alone with 80,000 People: From 11 NFL Rejections to Hall of Fame Glory', was published in March 2026.

== Career regular season statistics ==
Career high/best bold

Season	Team	G	FGM	FGA	%	LNG	XPM	XPA	%	PTS
1978	NE	2	0	1	0	0	7	7	100.0	7
1980	KC	16	20	26	76.9	57	37	37	100.0	97
1981	KC	16	26	36	72.2	52	37	38	97.4	115
1982	KC	9	19	24	79.2	47	17	17	100.0	74
1983	KC	16	24	30	80.0	58	44	45	97.8	116
1984	KC	16	23	33	69.7	52	35	35	100.0	104
1985	KC	16	24	27	88.9	58	35	35	100.0	107
1986	KC	16	19	26	73.1	47	43	43	100.0	100
1987	KC	12	19	23	82.6	54	26	26	100.0	83
1988	KC	16	27	32	84.4	51	23	23	100.0	104
1989	KC	16	24	33	72.7	50	34	35	97.1	106
1990	KC	16	34	37	91.9	48	37	38	97.4	139
1991	KC	16	25	30	83.3	48	35	35	100.0	110
1992	KC	15	22	24	91.7	52	39	39	100.0	105
1993	KC	16	23	29	79.3	52	37	37	100.0	106
1994	NYJ	16	20	23	87.0	49	26	27	96.3	86
1995	NYJ	14	17	21	81.0	50	24	24	100.0	75
1996	NYJ	16	17	24	70.8	46	26	27	96.3	77
Career		260	383	479	80.0	58	562	568	98.9	1711

During the 1993 season, Lowery also had 2 field goal attempts blocked. (These were the only two blocked kicks of his NFL career.)
