= WFNB =

WFNB may refer to:

- WFNB (AM), a radio station (1130 AM) licensed to serve Brazil, Indiana, United States
- WFNF (FM), a radio station (92.7 FM) licensed to serve Brazil, Indiana, which held the call sign WFNB from 2012 to 2024
