= WVIG =

WVIG may refer to:

- WVIG (FM), a radio station (105.5 FM) licensed to serve West Terre Haute, Indiana, United States
- WHLR, a radio station (95.9 FM) licensed to serve Seelyville, Indiana, which held the call sign WVIG from 2017 to 2022
