= WFNF =

WFNF may refer to:

- WFNF (FM), a radio station (92.7 FM) licensed to serve Brazil, Indiana, United States
- WFNB (AM), a radio station (1130 AM) licensed to serve Brazil, Indiana, which held the call sign WFNF from 2012 to 2017
- WLKK, a radio station (107.7 FM) licensed to serve Wethersfield, New York, which held the call sign WFNF from 1948 to 1953
