= Wako =

Wako, Wakō, Wakou, WAKO or W.A.K.O. can refer to:

== Place ==
- WAKO (AM), 910 AM, a radio station near Lawrenceville, Illinois
- WAKO-FM, 103.1 FM, a radio station near Lawrenceville, Illinois
- Wako (restaurant), a restaurant in San Francisco, California
- Wako (retailer), a Japanese retailer whose best known store is in Ginza, Tokyo
- Wakō, Saitama, a city in Japan
- Wako University a private university in Japan
- World Association of Kickboxing Organizations

== People ==
- Amos Wako, the attorney general of Kenya
- Gabriel Zubeir Wako, archbishop of Khartoum, Sudan
- Haruo Wakō, a member of the Japanese Red Army
- Naoki Wako, (born 1989) Japanese footballer
- Wako Matsumoto, (born 2005) Japanese idol

== See also ==
- Waco (disambiguation)
- Wokou (Japanese pronunciation wakō), pirates who raided the coastlines of China and Korea from the 13th to the 17th century
- Wakko (an Animaniacs character)
