= 1982 Lake Waco murders =

Killing of three victims in Texas

Lake Waco murders
- Kenneth Franks (left), Raylene Rice (center), and Jill Montgomery (right)
- Location: 31.54157°N 97.21589°W; Koehne Park, Lake Waco, Texas, U.S.
- Date: July 13, 1982 c. 11:00 p.m. (UTC-6)
- Attack type: Kidnapping, rape, mass murder
- Weapons: Buck knife, screwdriver
- Deaths: Kenneth Franks (18), Raylene Rice (17), Jill Montgomery (17)
- Perpetrators: David Wayne Spence (23), Anthony Melendez (22), Gilbert Melendez (24)
- Motive: Revenge; control; rape; sadism

On July 13, 1982, three teenagers (two females, one male) were abducted and murdered near Lake Waco in Waco, Texas. The victims were murdered in a case of mistaken identity due to one of the victims, Jill Montgomery, having been falsely identified as a young woman and close friend of hers named Gayle Kelley, who had herself been a friend of the male victim, Kenneth Franks.

Kelley had taken advantage of a local married Jordanian shopkeeper; she had also borne a marked resemblance to Jill Montgomery. Franks had been a close friend of hers; Rice was a friend of Montgomery's who had traveled from Waxahachie to socialize on the evening of the murders.

The police investigation and criminal trials that followed the murders lasted for more than a decade and resulted in the execution of one man, David Wayne Spence, and life sentences for two other men involved in the crime, Anthony and Gilbert Melendez. A fourth suspect, Muneer Mohammad Deeb, was eventually released after spending several years in prison.

== Murders ==
On the afternoon of July 13, 1982, Anthony Melendez and his cousin, Perry Surita, finished their decorating jobs in Bryan, Texas before driving to Waco to purchase amphetamines. In Waco, Melendez encountered David Spence; the trio drove to purchase beers, and soon met Anthony's brother Gilbert Melendez walking along the roadside. He entered their vehicle. Shortly thereafter, the four—having drank beer and smoked marijuana—drove to Lake Waco, where they encountered Kenneth Lamar Franks (18), his girlfriend Jill Montgomery (17), and Montgomery's friend Raylene LaDell Rice (17). According to Anthony Melendez, Spence remarked: "I know those people! Those are the ones I told you about that ripped that dude off!" Spence, plus Anthony and Gilbert Melendez, approached the trio as Surita remained in the vehicle. Surita then heard Spence refer to Montgomery by another name he could not recall, although Montgomery replied she was not the individual he had named.

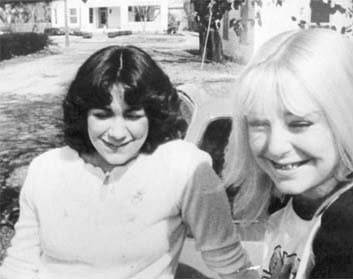
Jill Montgomery (left) and Raylene Rice, c. summer 1982

According to Surita, Franks, Montgomery and Rice were persuaded to accompany them to purchase beer, then drive back to the lake to "party a little". All agreed, with Franks and Rice entering the rear of the vehicle, and Montgomery sitting in the front passenger seat. Minutes after entering Melendez's vehicle, Spence attempted to grope one of Montgomery's breasts; in response, Montgomery slapped him. Franks then attempted to intervene, although Gilbert Melendez punched him, then threatened him to "Shut up!" Spence—driving the vehicle and enraged at having been slapped—then produced a knife as Rice and Montgomery protested and asked to be released from the car. He then pulled off the road at a secluded section of Speegleville Park and ordered the teenagers out of the vehicle as Anthony Melendez retrieved a screwdriver. Both girls were then ordered to remove their clothes as Spence instructed Gilbert Melendez to gag and then "tie [Franks] up".

As Anthony Melendez stood over Kenneth Franks, Gilbert Melendez raped Raylene Rice in the front seat of the car. David Spence then dragged Jill Montgomery into a section of undergrowth, then shouted for Anthony Melendez to bring Kenneth Franks over to watch, at knife-point, Spence rape his girlfriend. Anthony Melendez was then encouraged to rape Montgomery, although he was unable to obtain an erection.

Spence then approached Franks and, referring to the nickname of a local shopkeeper, stated: "You been messing with Lucky's old lady!" Franks attempted to speak, but was grabbed by the throat and stabbed numerous times in the chest until he fell to the ground. According to Surita, Spence then straddled Franks and stared into his eyes until he "stopped moving".

Anthony Melendez then unsuccessfully attempted to rape Raylene Rice as his brother raped Montgomery. Spence then sat on Montgomery's legs, placed his hand over her mouth and—falsely believing Montgomery had cheated a friend of his on a drug deal—stated, "Now I'm going to get even with you." He then inflicted numerous cut and stab wounds to her chest before biting off one nipple as Anthony Melendez stabbed Montgomery twice. Spence then ordered Raylene Rice out of the Melendez brothers' car; she was then almost immediately stabbed to death, having been informed, "Now you're going to get yours."

Initially, Spence had planned to transport the teenagers' bodies to a remote section of Speegleville Park; however, he waited alongside their bodies until the Melendez brothers retrieved their pickup truck. Their bodies were then bound and transported a location on the other side of Lake Waco in the pickup truck; the girls' nude bodies were concealed in undergrowth, whereas Spence positioned Franks's body midway across a path, close to a tree. He then returned to the Melendez brothers and Surita, stating: "Man. They're gonna freak when they find that dude sitting up with his sunglasses on."

=== Discovery ===
Map of Lake Waco, depicting the locations of the teenagers' murder and the discovery of their bodies

On the evening of July 14, 1982, two fishermen discovered the bodies of Montgomery, Rice, and Franks, in Speegleville Park, near Lake Waco. A police officer on scene, patrol sergeant Truman Simon, found Franks' body under a large tree propped up against the stump with sunglasses over his eyes. He had been gagged, then stabbed multiple times in the chest. The first female victim found, Raylene, was stabbed repeatedly and left with her hands bound behind her back and gagged, naked, aside from a bra that was tied to her right leg. Jill was found last, stabbed repeatedly as well as the other victims and her hands were bound and she was gagged as well. All of the teenagers were bound with shoelaces, and stabbed a total of 48 times. Shallow stab wounds suggested that they had been tortured.

== Investigation ==
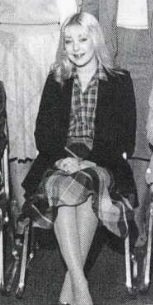
Raylene Rice, pictured in 1982

The investigation was initially headed by Lieutenant Marvin Horton of the Waco police department, with assistance from Detective Ramon Salinas and Patrolman Mike Nicoletti. Truman Simons, who was with the Waco police department and had been one of the first respondents on the crime scene, also assisted the investigation in an informal capacity.

Initially, the investigation revealed several different possible suspects, including James Russell Bishop and Terry Harper, residents who had been tied to the area at the time of the crime. However, both men were found to have credible alibis at the time (Harper's alibi was later proven false when Spence's attorneys investigated it in more detail). In September that year, the investigation began to stall and was marked as "suspended". Simons, who had taken a significant personal interest in the case, requested that he be given permission to continue investigating the case, which he was subsequently granted.

Within a few days, the first arrest in the case was made. Muneer Mohammad Deeb, a local gas station owner, was known to have had a contentious relationship with Kenneth Franks. The two had engaged in verbal confrontations on multiple occasions. Following the murders, he had even commented to two young women that he committed the murders. After one of the women reported this comment to the police, Deeb was quickly arrested and submitted to a polygraph test, which he passed. Subsequently, Deeb was released for lack of evidence.

The case languished for nearly a year until the work of Simons and others had produced enough evidence again to arrest Deeb and three alleged accomplices in the plot. Deeb had had a life insurance policy for one employee at his convenience store who bore a striking resemblance to Jill Montgomery. Simons hypothesized that Deeb had hired David Wayne Spence to murder her and that Spence and two friends, Anthony and Gilbert Melendez, had seen the victims and mistaken Montgomery for the target. They speculated that the other two victims had been murdered because they were witnesses.

== Trials ==
Deeb, Spence, and the Melendez brothers were indicted late 1983. District Attorney Vic Feazell, whose office had been instrumental in continuing to pursue new evidence in the case, would manage the prosecution against the accused. Spence and both Melendez brothers were, at the time, already serving prison sentences for various crimes. Spence was serving a 90-year sentence for raping a man and was later linked to the rape of a 17-year-old girl named Lisa Kader.

The evidence against the men largely consisted of testimony provided by other inmates, who claimed that the defendants had admitted to their involvement in the killings in private discussions, as well as confessions made by Anthony and Gilbert Melendez. Also considered was the confession Deeb had made to the two young women about his involvement in the killings and the life insurance policy he had taken out for his employee. Bite marks on the victims were also presented as evidence of Spence’s involvement.

The trials began in May, with testimony from dental specialists supplementing the evidence that the prison witnesses had provided. In June, Anthony Melendez pleaded guilty to the crimes and was sentenced to life imprisonment. Spence’s case was badly damaged by Melendez’ confession, which played a key role in his eventual conviction in July 1984. Unlike Melendez, Spence was sentenced to death for his involvement in the killings.

In January 1985, Gilbert Melendez also pleaded guilty to the murders and agreed to testify against Deeb. Like his brother, he received a term of life imprisonment in exchange for this confession. Gilbert Melendez died in prison in 1998 from AIDS-related complications. Anthony Melendez died in prison on January 13, 2017. The Melendez brothers would both later recant their confessions. Anthony said he only confessed to avoid execution.

Deeb, who had continued to protest his innocence, was found guilty of instigating the murders, and was sentenced to death on June 30th, 1985.

== Appeals ==
Spence and Deeb maintained their innocence following their convictions, and both men sought appeals. In 1991, Deeb’s appeal was granted when the Court of Criminal Appeals “ruled that the testimony of a jail inmate should not have been allowed” in his initial trial. Deeb won his new trial in January 1993 and was subsequently released from prison. Those who had been involved in the initial prosecution were stunned. Former McLennan County District Attorney Vic Feazell, who had prosecuted Deeb, stated following the trial, "I am perplexed and bewildered, as I'm sure a lot of people are. But in my mind, this doesn't change anything as far as Mr. Deeb's culpability goes."

David Wayne Spence’s appeals were unsuccessful, and in April 1997, he was executed for his role in the killings.

== Controversy ==
Following the convictions of Spence and Deeb, some began to question the substance of the evidence on which the convictions had been based and the methods through which it had been obtained. Forensic odontologist Homer Campbell was proven to have made false assessments at around the same time (he identified a corpse as belonging to a young runaway named Melody Cutlip based on dental records; 1 year later Cutlip turned up alive and well.) When a blind panel examined the alleged bite marks and a mold of Spence's teeth, two matched them to a Kansas housewife, and the other three could not match them to anyone's teeth. Three of the seven people who said Spence confessed later stated that Simons had offered them privileges to secure their testimony, including one that said he had fed her info on what to say. Spence's lawyers also discovered an alternate suspect in Terry Harper, a local thug with a history of knife-related offenses. Witnesses testified to seeing Harper in the park on the night of the murders, and others claimed he had boasted of committing the murders before they were reported in the press. One of the victims, Kenneth Franks, was also later alleged to have been an associate of Harper's in the drug trade. When Harper was interviewed by Spence's lawyers, he claimed that he was at home watching Dynasty; records showed that Dynasty did not air that night. Brian Pardo, a wealthy Texas businessman, met Spence a few months before his execution and, on becoming convinced of his innocence, launched a campaign to delay his death sentence so that a new trial could be commenced. His efforts were unsuccessful, but they brought attention to the case following Spence’s execution. Harper would ultimately commit suicide to avoid being arrested for fatally stabbing an elderly man.

One year after Spence was convicted, his mother was murdered. While the local police believed it was a man named Benny Carroll who committed the crime, Truman Simons took charge of the investigation and ultimately convicted two men, Joe Williams and Calvin Washington. As in Spence's case, he relied heavily on Homer Campbell. In 2001, DNA testing proved that it was in fact Benny Carroll who had committed the murder.

Bob Herbert wrote a series of articles for The New York Times in 1997, with headlines such as "The Wrong Man" and "The Impossible Crime", in which he claimed that the case had been "cobbled [...] together from the fabricated and often preposterous testimony of inmates who were granted all manner of favors in return."

== Media ==
=== Bibliography ===
- Jessel, David (1992). "Texas Teenage Murders". Murder Casebook (146). Marshall Cavendish: 5224–5245. ISBN 0-748-51454-6.
- Stowers, Carlton (1988). Careless Whispers: The Lake Waco Murders. Rowman & Littlefield. ISBN 978-0-878-33530-5.

=== Television ===
- The made-for-TV film Sworn to Vengeance is directly based upon the Lake Waco Murders. Directed by Peter H. Hunt and released in 1993, the movie stars Robert Conrad as one of the officers investigating the murders.

== See also ==
- Capital punishment in Texas
- Capital punishment in the United States
- Crime of opportunity – Crime committed without planning
- Eyewitness misidentification – Identification by a person who witnessed an event
- List of people executed in Texas, 1990–1999
- List of people executed in the United States in 1997

== Cited works and further reading ==
- Berry-Dee, Christopher (2009). Born Killers. John Blake Publishing. ISBN 978-1-84454-848-4.
- Branson, Jack; Branson, Mary (2011). Delayed Justice: Inside Stories from America's Best Cold Case Investigations. Prometheus Books. ISBN 978-1-616-14392-3.
- Cawthorne, Nigel; Tibballs, Geoff (1993). Killers. Boxtree. ISBN 0-7522-0850-0.
- Dunning, John (1987). Mindless Murders. Mulberry Editions. ISBN 978-1-873-12333-1.
- Hall, Michael (2014). "The Murders at the Lake". Texas Monthly (April 2014). Emmis Publishing, L.P. ISBN 978-0-292-71675-9.
- Holmes, Ronald M.; Holmes, Stephen T. (2002). Profiling Violent Crimes: An Investigative Tool. Sage Publications. ISBN 978-0-761-92594-1.
- Koen, Wendy; Bowers, C. Michael (1992). Forensic Science Reform: Protecting the Innocent. Academic Press. ISBN 978-0-128-02738-7.
- Moore, Oscar (2022). Murder at the Lake. ASIN B0B9ZWP43D.
- O'Brien, Michael (2021). Killing Justice in the Lone Star State: Calling Time on Texas Death Row. Rowman & Littlefield. ISBN 978-1-909-97692-4.
- Stone, Michael H.; Brucato, Gary (2019). The New Evil: Understanding the Emergence of Modern Violent Crime. Prometheus Books. ISBN 978-1-63388-532-5.
- Wilson, Colin (1985). Encyclopedia of Modern Murder: 1962–1982. Bonanza Books. ISBN 978-0-517-66559-6.
- Wilson, Colin (1995). Written in Blood: A History of Forensic Detection. HarperCollins. ISBN 978-0-58620-842-7.
