= Wiqu =

Wiqu may refer to:

- Wiqu (Cusco-Puno), a mountain on the border of the Cusco Region and the Puno Region, Peru
- Wiqu (Lima), a mountain in the Lima Region, Peru
- Wiqu (Puno), a mountain in the Puno Region, Peru
- Wiqu (Tacna), a mountain in the Tacna Region, Peru

== See also ==
- Hueco (disambiguation)
- Waco (disambiguation)
