= Vic Feazell =

American lawyer

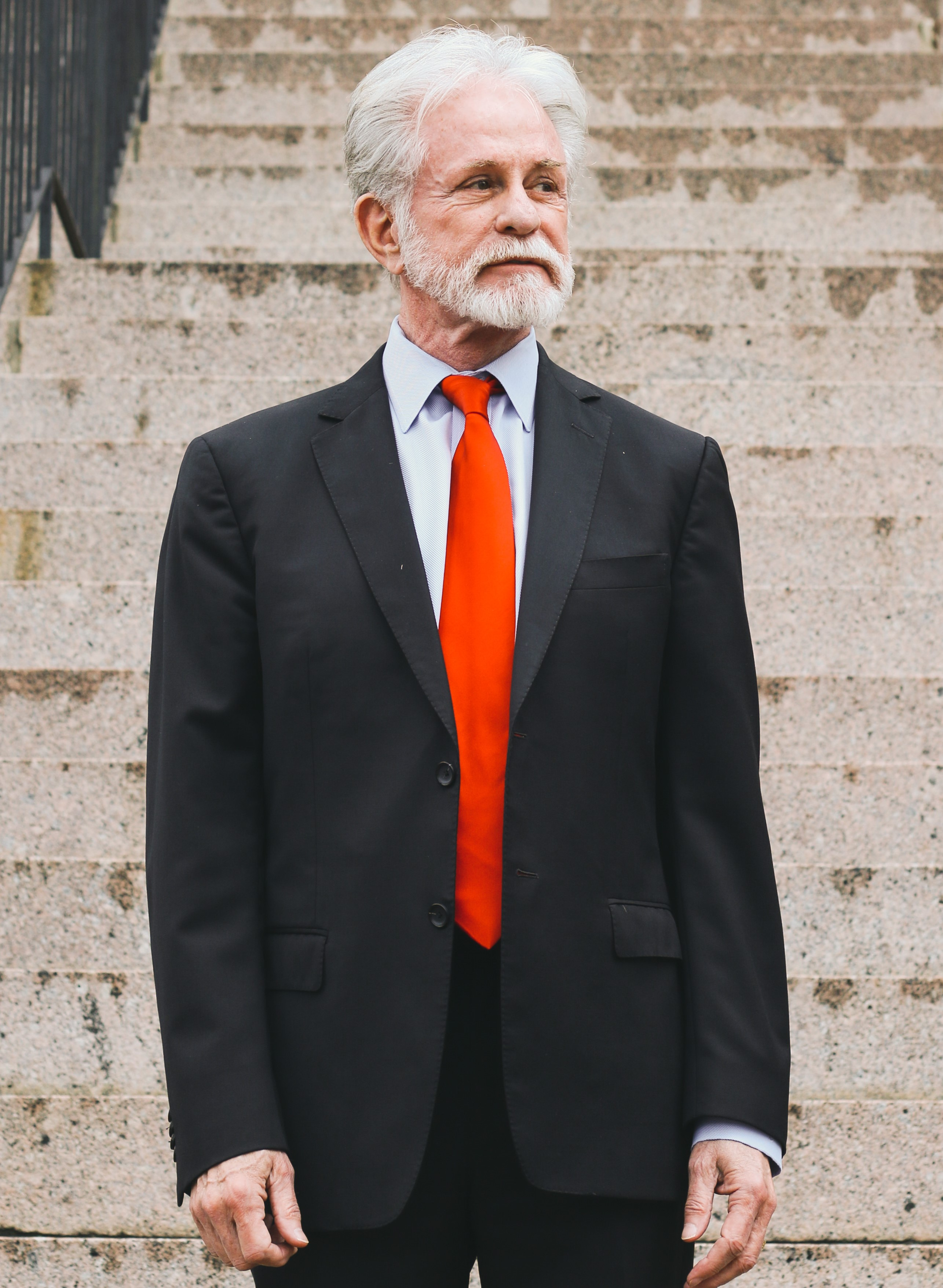
Vic Feazell in front of the McLennan County Courthouse, Waco TX

Vic Feazell is an American lawyer, who was a District Attorney in Waco, McLennan County from 1983 until his resignation in 1988. During his time in office he was involved in the investigation and prosecution of the 1982 Lake Waco murders and also several crimes to which Henry Lee Lucas had been linked. Feazell currently resides in Waco, Texas, and is an attorney with his own firm. He is known for his commercials sporting the "Drive Laid Back" slogan.

== Early life ==
Feazell was raised in Texas. At 17 years old, he took the civil service exam and was hired by the Austin Police Department. In the early 1970s, Feazell graduated from University of Mary Hardin Baylor and he then attended Baylor Law School, receiving his J.D. in May 1979. Ten days after graduation from law school, Feazell tried his first jury trial, alone, and won it.

== Career ==
Feazell announced his candidacy for District Attorney of McLennan County in Waco, Texas in 1982. He would go on to win the election against the incumbent district attorney and became one of the youngest to hold the position in McLennan County. During his first term as District Attorney, Feazell tried the 1982 Lake Waco Triple Murders. In 1984, a jury found David Wayne Spence guilty of the murders and sentenced him to death. A chronicle of the Lake Waco Murders can be found in the Edgar Award-winning book Careless Whispers by Carlton Stowers. Feazell notes on his website that he is "now a vocal advocate against the death penalty."

In 1984, after Henry Lee Lucas claimed to have killed over 300 people across the country, the Texas Rangers announced numerous murders to have been solved. Three of these announced murders were in McLennan County. An investigation by the Dallas Times-Herald, published in 1985, cast doubt on the validity of Lucas's confession spree, but the Rangers stood by the confessions as legitimate and their claims that Lucas was a mass-murderer. This prompted Feazell to begin investigating the claims, and eventually publish the Lucas Report. The report suggested that Lucas could not have committed some of the murders to which he had confessed, including the ones in McLennan County. The Texas Rangers were unhappy with Feazell's defiance and casting doubt on them. The Texas Department of Public Safety began an investigation of Feazell which several sources have tied to retaliation against Feazell; Feazell was arrested, and his office and home searched by agents.

Feazell's arrest came seven weeks before election day. Voters in McLennan County re-elected Feazell for another term. During the criminal investigation leading up to Feazell's indictment, a reporter from Dallas television station WFAA-TV named Charles Duncan ran an eleven-part series about Feazell, which later led to a libel judgement in favor of Feazell worth $58 million. This series was the only evidence shown to the federal grand jury that indicted Feazell. Feazell was found not guilty of all charges on June 29, 1987. Feazell then returned to work as District Attorney of McLennan County. On September 13, 1988, Feazell sent out a press release stating he would be resigning as District Attorney.

Feazell then began representing Lucas in all of the still-pending murder cases he had confessed to around the country. Feazell spent much of the 1990s representing Lucas to ensure he was not convicted based on any more false confessions. The work done by Feazell and others cast enough doubt on the validity of the Lucas confession to the Orange Socks murder case that in 1998 then-Governor George W. Bush commuted Lucas's death sentence to life imprisonment.

In 1991, represented by former U.S. Attorney Gary Richardson, Feazell was awarded a $58 million judgment for libel charges against WFAA-TV, at the time the largest libel judgment in U.S. history. As a result, he was cited in the 1993 edition of Guinness World Records for largest defamation lawsuit in history.

A.H. Belo Corp, WFAA's parent company later announced the $58 million libel judgment was dismissed as part of a settlement. The terms of the settlement with Feazell were not disclosed.

In the 21st century, Feazell formed his own law office, The Law Offices of Vic Feazell with offices presently in Austin and Waco, Texas. The offices work primarily with personal injury cases and occasionally criminal cases.
