= Waco (disambiguation) =

Waco, Texas, is a city in the United States.

Waco or WACO may also refer to:

== Related to Native Americans ==
- Waco tribe, a Native American subtribe of the Wichita people
  - A dialect of the Wichita language

== Places in the United States ==
- Waco, Georgia, a city
- Waco, Kentucky, an unincorporated community
- Waco, Kansas, an unincorporated community
- Waco, Missouri, a city
- Waco, Montana, a populated place and former town site
- Waco, Nebraska, a village
- Waco, North Carolina, a town
- Waco, Ohio, an unincorporated community
- Waco, Tennessee, an unincorporated community
- Lake Waco, a reservoir in Waco, Texas
- Waco Township, Sedgwick County, Kansas

== Events ==
- Waco siege, the 1993 U.S. government assault on the compound of David Koresh and the Branch Davidians

== Business ==
- Waco Aircraft Company, a U.S. aircraft manufacturer
- Waco (toymaker), a defunct toy company which released the first commercially available electronic handheld game in 1972
- Waco, a previous name of the Dr Pepper soft drink

== Film and television ==
- Waco (1952 film), starring Wild Bill Elliott
- Waco (1966 film), a Western starring Jane Russell and Howard Keel
- Waco, the Big Lie, a 1993 American documentary about the Waco siege directed by Linda Thompson
- Waco II, the Big Lie Continues, a 1994 follow up sequel addressing criticisms of the original
- Waco: The Rules of Engagement, a 1997 documentary about the Waco siege (see below)
- Waco (miniseries), a 2018 American miniseries about the Waco siege

== Music ==
- Waco (album), a 2016 album by Violent Soho
- Western Australian Charity Orchestra or WACO, in Perth, Western
- "Waco, Texas", a 2025 song by Ethel Cain from Willoughby Tucker, I'll Always Love You

== Radio stations ==
- WACO (AM), in Waco, Texas, now KCLE (AM) in Burleson
- WACO-FM, an FM radio station in Waco, Texas

== Other uses ==
- Waco High School, Waco, Texas

== See also ==
- Wacol (disambiguation)
- Wako (disambiguation)
