= Chicago Cubs Radio Network =

Official radio network of MLB's Chicago Cubs

The Chicago Cubs Radio Network (known in 2024 and 2025 as the Southwest Airlines Cubs Radio Network for sponsorship reasons) is the network of radio stations that broadcast Cubs games on 30 stations in six states.

Veteran broadcaster Pat Hughes has been the play-by-play announcer since 1996. From 1996 to 2010, Hughes was partnered with Ron Santo. After Santo's death, Keith Moreland took over as color analyst through 2013. Ron Coomer took over color analyst duties in 2014. Zach Zaidman handles the Cubs Central pre- and post-game shows and takes over the play-by-play for the fifth inning of most games.

All 162 regular season baseball games, some spring training games, and all postseason games are broadcast by the network, though not all affiliates distribute the entire slate. The games are transmitted to stations via C-Band satellite service on AMC-8.

From 1925 to 2014 (continuously from 1958 to 2014), the Cubs' flagship station was WGN, 720 AM, the lone radio station of the Tribune Company (which for many years simultaneously owned the Cubs, TV station WGN-TV and its national superstation, and the local newspaper from which it gets its name, the Chicago Tribune). When it was part of the Tribune Radio Network, the network's non-sports programming included the National Farm Report, a farm news feature hosted by Orion Samuelson; Samuelson Sez (a weekly commentary hosted by Samuelson); and Farming America, a farm news feature hosted by Steve Alexander (previously by Max Armstrong).

In 2015, the Cubs' broadcast rights moved to CBS Radio (later Entercom, then Audacy) after Tribune declined to renew its longstanding broadcast rights. The 2015 season was broadcast by WBBM. After sister station WSCR's loss of radio rights to broadcast the Chicago White Sox games to WLS in July 2015, it was widely expected that the Cubs would move to WSCR as a replacement. This move was confirmed by CBS Radio on November 11, 2015 and finalized before the start of the 2016 Cubs season. Through WSCR, the games also aired on the FM dial via HD Radio through WSCR's subchannel on WBMX (104.3-HD2). In 2026, WBMX-FM HD1 flipped from classic hip-hop to all sports 104.3 The Score with the call letters now WSCR-FM, simulcasting WSCR-AM. The Cubs are now on 104.3 HD1 and HD2 now has The Bet Chicago.

== Affiliates ==
State	City	Station	Frequency
Illinois	Champaign	WGKC	FM 105.9
Illinois	Chicago	WSCR; WSCR-FM; WPPN	AM 670 (Flagship Station); FM 104.3; FM (HD2) 106.7 (Spanish)
Illinois	Decatur	WDZ	AM 1050
Illinois	Lawrenceville	WAKO; W257DW	AM 910; FM 99.3
Illinois	Lawrenceville	WAKO-FM	FM 103.1
Illinois	Monmouth	WRAM	AM 1330
Illinois	Peoria	WZPN; WHPI	FM 101.1; FM 96.5
Illinois	Springfield	WFMB	AM 1450
Illinois	Sterling	WSSQ	FM 105.5
Indiana	Boonville	WBNL	AM 1540
Indiana	Lafayette	WASK	AM 1450
Indiana	Marion	WBAT	AM 1400
Indiana	Elkhart	WTRC	AM 1340
Iowa	Boone	KWBG	AM 1590
Iowa	Bloomfield	KUDV	FM 106.9
Iowa	Carroll	KCIM	AM 1380
Iowa	Cedar Falls	KCNZ	AM 1650
Iowa	Cedar Rapids	KGYM	AM 1600
Iowa	Des Moines	KRNT	AM 1350
Iowa	Dubuque	WDBQ	AM 1490
Iowa	Elkader	KADR	AM 1400
Iowa	Fairfield	KMCD	AM 1570
Iowa	Harlan	KNOD	FM 105.3 (pending)
Iowa	Iowa City	KGYM	FM 106.3
Iowa	West Burlington	KCPS	AM 1150
Michigan	Kalamazoo	WTOU	AM 1660
Michigan	Petoskey	WWMN	AM 1110
Michigan	Traverse City	WJNL	AM 1210
Minnesota	Sauk Rapids	WBHR	AM 660
North Dakota	Fargo	WDAY (AM)	AM 970
Nebraska	Omaha	KIBM	AM 1490
South Dakota	Vermillion	KVTK	AM 1570
Wisconsin	Madison	WTSO	AM 1070

== See also ==
- List of XM Satellite Radio channels
- List of Sirius Satellite Radio stations
