= WDKE =

WDKE may refer to:

- WDKE (FM), a radio station (96.1 FM) licensed to serve Coleraine, Minnesota, United States
- WHLR, a radio station (95.9 FM) licensed to serve Seelyville, Indiana, United States, which held the call sign WDKE from 2014 to 2017
