= WVIG (FM) =

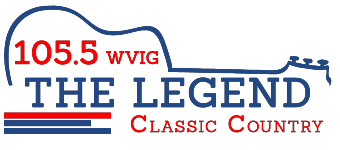
- West Terre Haute, Indiana; United States
- Broadcast area: Terre Haute metropolitan area
- Frequency: 105.5 MHz
- Branding: 105.5 The Legend

Programming
- Format: Classic country
- Affiliations: SRN News

Ownership
- Owner: Joey and Kelsey O’Rourke; (JKO Media Group)
- Sister stations: WFNB; WFNF; WMMC

History
- First air date: 1967 (as WWVR)
- Former call signs: WWVR (1966–2017); WZJK (2017–2022)

Technical information
- Licensing authority: FCC
- Facility ID: 68824
- Class: A
- ERP: 3,300 watts
- HAAT: 90 meters (300 ft)
- Transmitter coordinates: 39°27′13.1″N 87°28′15.1″W

Links
- Public license information: Public file; LMS
- Webcast: Listen live
- Website: www.wvigthelegend.com

WVIG (105.5 MHz, "The Legend") is an FM radio station broadcasting a classic country music format. Licensed to West Terre Haute, Indiana, United States, the station serves the Terre Haute area. The station is owned by Joey and Kelsey O’Rourke, through licensee JKO Media Group.

WVIG is not licensed to broadcast in the digital hybrid HD format.

== History ==
Logo as WZJK "Jack FM"

On January 30, 2017, David Crooks' DLC Media took over ownership of WZJK as the previous call sign, WWVR, moved to Midwest Communications' 98.5 signal as "98.5 The River WWVR", replacing WBOW. Upon the move, 105.5 flipped to variety hits as "105.5 Jack FM", with new call sign WZJK.

In August 2021, DLC Media announced that it would sell WVIG (95.9 FM) to the Educational Media Foundation. The WVIG call sign was to be moved to 105.5 after the sale of 95.9. WVIG's classic country format was moved to WZJK, replacing the Jack FM variety hits format. The 95.9 facility then was taken silent. The station assumed the WVIG call sign from 95.9 on January 26, 2022. In 2024, DLC Media sold WVIG, along with WAMB and WFNB in Brazil, to Joey and Kelsey O’Rourke's JKO Media for $875,000.
