= WSDX =

WSDX may refer to:

- WSDX-LP, a low-power radio station (101.9 FM) licensed to serve Brandon, Florida, United States
- WFNB (AM), a radio station (1130 AM) licensed to serve Brazil, Indiana, United States, which held the call sign WSDX from 2000 to 2012
