= KCPS =

Radio station in Burlington, Iowa, United States

- Burlington, Iowa; United States
- Frequency: 1150 kHz
- Branding: KCPS 1150

Programming
- Format: Talk/Personality
- Affiliations: Townhall News; Premiere Networks; Westwood One; Compass Media Networks; Motor Racing Network; Chicago Bears Radio Network; Chicago Cubs Radio Network

Ownership
- Owner: John M. Giannettino

History
- First air date: 1965
- Former call signs: KBIA (1965, CP); KYED (1965–1967); KYND (1967–1970); KKUZ (1970–1979)

Technical information
- Licensing authority: FCC
- Facility ID: 5224
- Class: D
- Power: 500 watts day 67 watts night
- Transmitter coordinates: 40°51′11″N 91°08′10″W

Links
- Public license information: Public file; LMS
- Webcast: Listen Live
- Website: kcpsradio.com

KCPS (1150 AM) is a radio station broadcasting a Talk/Personality format. Licensed to serve the Burlington, Iowa, United States. area, the station is currently owned by John M. Giannettino and features programming from Premiere Networks, Compass Media Networks, Townhall News, Motor Racing Network, and Westwood One.

== History ==
KCPS signed on the air in 1965 as KYED, changing its call letters in 1967 to KYND. The call letters changed again in 1970 to KKUZ branded as "Your Country Cousin", as the station became an outlet for country music and the station was sold to Big Country Broadcasting. Studios for the AM station were located in a three-story brick building at 408 North Main Street in downtown Burlington.

The transmitter site was constructed on a pasture north of town along Irish Ridge Road. KCPS has a directional array consisting of three 214-foot towers and a daytime power output of 500 watts. KCPS was originally a daytime only station. Operating hours expanded and contracted each month from summer to winter. In the late 1970s the sign-on became locked in at 6:00am, but the sign-off time occurred at sundown. In December KCPS left the air as early as 4:45pm. In the summer months the station stayed on the air until 8:45pm. The FCC changed the rules for daytime stations in the 1980s and which enabled KCPS to broadcast at night with the transmitter power reduced to 67 watts.

DJs from the early years included Bill Deno, Lonnie Keeler, and Neil Zackmeyer, who referred to himself “The Old Gravy Sopper.”

KKUZ was purchased by Town and Country Broadcasting in 1978; the call letters were changed to KCPS on March 1, 1979. CPS stands for Country-Politan Sound, a term the new owners defined as a cross between country music and adult contemporary. The morning man during this era was Wayne Smith, who also served as program director. The afternoons were hosted by David Ostmo, who called his program “The Smo Show”.

Terry Anderson was News Director for the station, coming to KCPS from crosstown rival KBUR. She delivered the news for the station during the morning hours; top of the hour newscasts for the rest of the day were handled by the program hosts.

David Ostmo was promoted to Program Director after Wayne Smith departed in 1979. Ostmo emceed a popular Sunday afternoon request show. He mixed in a greater amount of rock music to the station's play list. The approach was to play rock that sounded like country and country that sounded like rock. Charlie Daniels, Bob Seger, The Eagles, The Little River Band, Elvis, Kenny Rogers, and Dolly Parton were some of the artists receiving considerable air time.

Darrell Michelson moved from Fairbury, Nebraska to replace Smith as the new morning man. Michelson stayed with the station until 1990. Michelson succeeded Ostmo as Program Director in late 1980. He took advantage of the Urban Cowboy craze and returned the station to its country music roots.

The station was not affiliated with any major radio network until 1981 when KCPS signed up with the ABC Contemporary radio network. In the same timeframe, Town and Country Broadcasting lost a long fought battle with another company to acquire an FM license. It was a major blow to the owners, who had hoped to level the playing field with KBUR-KGRS. Time was running out for AM stations with a music-heavy format.

Chip Giannettino and his wife Val bought KCPS in 1987, and the station's musical programming gave way to talk driven programs, both local and syndicated, including a popular local morning talk show called The Big Show Incorporated, Rush Limbaugh, Glenn Beck, Ben Shapiro, Michael Savage, Mark Levin, Lars Larson, Jim Bohannon, and the Red Eye Radio show. The station also carries Westwood One sports and the Chicago Bears and Chicago Cubs.

They painted a large mural on the exterior of the downtown studios depicting ladies of the evening through open windows; it was said that the building, originally constructed in 1870, was once a brothel on the upper floors.

The station later moved to another downtown location at 208 Jefferson. In 2008 KCPS relocated to modern studios at 205 S. Gear Avenue in West Burlington.

KCPS was Burlington's only locally owned station until November 2007.

In the fall of 2009, in coordination with the national Cash for Clunkers campaign, KCPS sponsored a “Blow Up My Clunker” contest. The contest allowed several listeners to compete in a competition to see who could destroy “clunkers” from the Deery Brothers auto dealership. The cars had been prepped for destruction by having the motor oil drained and replaced with a sodium silicate solution. Five of the six vehicles were nearly instantly destroyed, however, the sixth vehicle, a Nissan Hardbody Truck ran for over thirty minutes until finally succumbing to the sodium silicate.

In 2010 KCPS launched the “Triple-Cast” for their daily local broadcasts, including Streaming Audio, Studio-Cam, and a Chat room. Along with the live streaming, there is also an archive available of previously aired programs.

Former logo

In July 2015. Morning man Fred W. Hofmann broadcast his 10,000th radio show, highlighted by an Official City Proclamation from Burlington Mayor Shane McCampbell commemorating the occasion.
