= Steve Largent =

American football player and politician (born 1954)

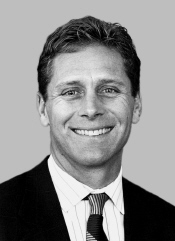

Member of the U.S. House of Representatives from Oklahoma's 1st district
- In office November 29, 1994 – February 15, 2002
- Preceded by: Jim Inhofe
- Succeeded by: John Sullivan

Personal details
- Born: Stephen Michael Largent; September 28, 1954 (age 72) Tulsa, Oklahoma, U.S.
- Party: Republican
- Spouse: Terry Largent
- Children: 4
- Education: University of Tulsa (BS)
- Football career

No. 80
- Position: Wide receiver

Personal information
- Listed height: 5 ft 11 in (1.80 m)
- Listed weight: 187 lb (85 kg)

Career information
- High school: Putnam City (Warr Acres, Oklahoma)
- College: Tulsa (1972–1975)
- NFL draft: 1976: 4th round, 117th overall pick

Career history
- Houston Oilers (1976)*; Seattle Seahawks (1976–1989)
- * Offseason or practice squad member only

Awards and highlights
- NFL Man of the Year (1988); 3× First-team All-Pro (1983, 1985, 1987); 4× Second-team All-Pro (1978, 1979, 1984, 1986); 7× Pro Bowl (1978, 1979, 1981, 1984–1987); 2× NFL receiving yards leader (1979, 1985); NFL 1980s All-Decade Team; NFL 100th Anniversary All-Time Team; PFWA All-Rookie Team (1976); Seattle Seahawks 35th Anniversary team; Seattle Seahawks Top 50 players; Seattle Seahawks Ring of Honor; Seattle Seahawks No. 80 retired; Second-team All-American (1975); Tulsa Golden Hurricane No. 83 retired

Career NFL statistics
- Receptions: 819
- Receiving yards: 13,089
- Receiving touchdowns: 100
- Stats at Pro Football Reference
- Pro Football Hall of Fame

Stephen Michael Largent (born September 28, 1954) is an American former professional football wide receiver and politician who played in the National Football League (NFL) for 14 seasons with the Seattle Seahawks. A member of the Republican Party, he served in the U.S. House of Representatives for Oklahoma's 1st congressional district from 1994 to 2002. He was also the Republican nominee in the 2002 Oklahoma gubernatorial election. Largent is regarded as one of the greatest wide receivers of all time.

Largent played college football at the University of Tulsa, where he studied biology, and began his NFL career with the expansion Seahawks in 1976. He was selected to seven Pro Bowls and three first-team All-Pros while twice leading the league in receiving yards. At the time of his retirement, he held all major NFL receiving records. Largent was inducted to the Pro Football Hall of Fame in 1995.

Following his playing career, Largent was elected to the U.S. House of Representatives in 1994 and served four terms, winning over 60% of the vote in each election. He resigned from his seat in 2002 to run for governor of Oklahoma, which he narrowly lost to Democratic state senator Brad Henry.

== Football career ==
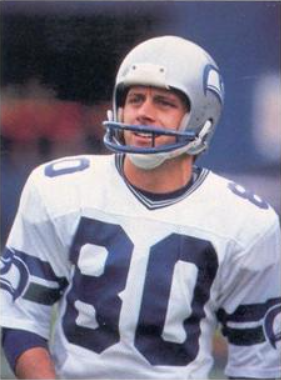
1985 card of Largent for Seattle Seahawks

In 1974 at the University of Tulsa, Largent had 884 yards receiving and 14 touchdown catches. In 1975, he had 51 catches for 1,000 yards and 14 touchdowns.

Despite an All-American career at Tulsa, Largent was not selected until the fourth round of the 1976 NFL draft by the Houston Oilers with the 117th pick. After four preseason games, he was slated to be cut. According to Largent, Bum Phillips called him into his office and told Largent he had all the receivers they needed, and that Houston would be releasing him. Largent feared his career was over before it began.

However, his college offensive coordinator, Jerry Rhome, was now the quarterbacks and receivers coach of the expansion Seattle Seahawks. Rhome convinced head coach Jack Patera to trade a 1977 eighth-round draft pick for Largent. His first practice with the team went horribly, as he was suffering from nine days of sleep deprivation while financially struggling to care for his mother and three younger brothers after their mother left her alcoholic and violent second husband. Despite this unpromising start, he made the roster of the expansion team's first season.

Largent spent his entire 14-year career with the Seahawks. While not particularly fast, he was extremely sure-handed and able to get open due to his precise route-running. Between 1976 and 1981, he and quarterback Jim Zorn—a fellow rookie in 1976—had more completions and yardage than any other pair in the league. He became the first Seahawk selected to the Pro Bowl, in 1978, and was selected six more times during his career. In 1979 he led the league in receiving yards with 1,237, and six years later did it again with 1,287 in 1985. His 1985 receiving yardage was a Seahawks franchise record that stood for 35 years until broken by DK Metcalf in 2020.

In 1987, Largent returned to play in a game against the Detroit Lions just before the end of the National Football League Players Association strike. Facing replacement players, he amassed 15 catches for 261 yards and three touchdowns. With the retirement of Charlie Joiner the previous year, Largent became the NFL's active leader in career receiving yards, retaining that lead until his retirement in 1989. He broke Joiner's all-time record for receiving yards (12,146) in week 3 of 1988.

In the same season, he was knocked unconscious and suffered a concussion and two cracked teeth when he was hit in the head with a forearm by Mike Harden of the Denver Broncos; Harden was fined $5000 by the league. Fourteen weeks later, in a rematch, Harden intercepted Dave Krieg's pass in the end zone, but Largent raced over and inflicted a blindside hit that caused Harden to fall to the ground and fumble the ball, which Largent then recovered; the play was negated by a defensive penalty, but Largent had gotten his revenge.

In 1989, Largent became the first Seahawks player to win the Steve Largent Award for his spirit, dedication, and integrity.

During his playing career, Largent was given the nickname "Yoda" for his ability to catch anything thrown at him. He attributed this ability to a skeet shooting buddy, a sport that focuses only on the edge of the skeet, as he only focused on the tip of the ball to track and catch balls, in the era where receivers and defensive backs did not wear gloves. This also allowed him to quickly adjust from catching balls thrown by left-handed Jim Zorn to right-handed Dave Krieg.

When Largent retired, he held all major NFL receiving records, including most receptions in a career (819), most receiving yards in a career (13,089), and most touchdown receptions (100). He also had a then-record streak of 177 consecutive regular-season games with a reception. He also holds the distinction as the first receiver in NFL history to grab 100 touchdown receptions in his career; his record stood until 1992 when it was broken by Jerry Rice. Largent was inducted into the Pro Football Hall of Fame in 1995, his first year of eligibility. He tossed the ceremonial coin at Super Bowl XXIX that year; Largent was the first Seahawks player to both participate in a Super Bowl and to become a Pro Football Hall of Famer. In 1999, he was ranked number 46 on The Sporting News list of the 100 Greatest Football Players, the only Seahawk to make the list. His #80 was retired in 1992; Largent is the first Seahawk player to be so honored. During Jerry Rice's stint with the Seahawks in 2004, Largent's #80 was temporarily "unretired" after then Seahawks president Bob Whitsitt misled Largent and Rice to increase jersey sales. Largent remains the most prolific receiver in team history. On October 26, 2008, Largent's University of Tulsa #83 was also retired.

== NFL career statistics ==
Legend
	Led the league
**Bold**	Career high

Year	Team	GP	GS	Receiving				
Year	Team	GP	GS	Rec	Yds	Avg	Lng	TD
1976	SEA	14	13	54	705	13.1	45	4
1977	SEA	14	14	33	643	**19.5**	**74**	10
1978	SEA	16	16	71	1,168	16.5	57	8
1979	SEA	15	15	66	1,237	18.7	55	9
1980	SEA	16	16	66	1,064	16.1	67	6
1981	SEA	16	16	75	1,224	16.3	57	9
1982	SEA	8	8	34	493	14.5	45	3
1983	SEA	15	14	72	1,074	14.9	46	11
1984	SEA	16	16	74	1,164	15.7	65	**12**
1985	SEA	16	16	**79**	**1,287**	16.3	43	6
1986	SEA	16	16	70	1,070	15.3	38	9
1987	SEA	13	13	58	912	15.7	55	8
1988	SEA	15	15	39	645	16.5	46	2
1989	SEA	10	9	28	403	14.4	33	3
Career		200	197	819	13,089	16.0	74	100

== Career highlights ==
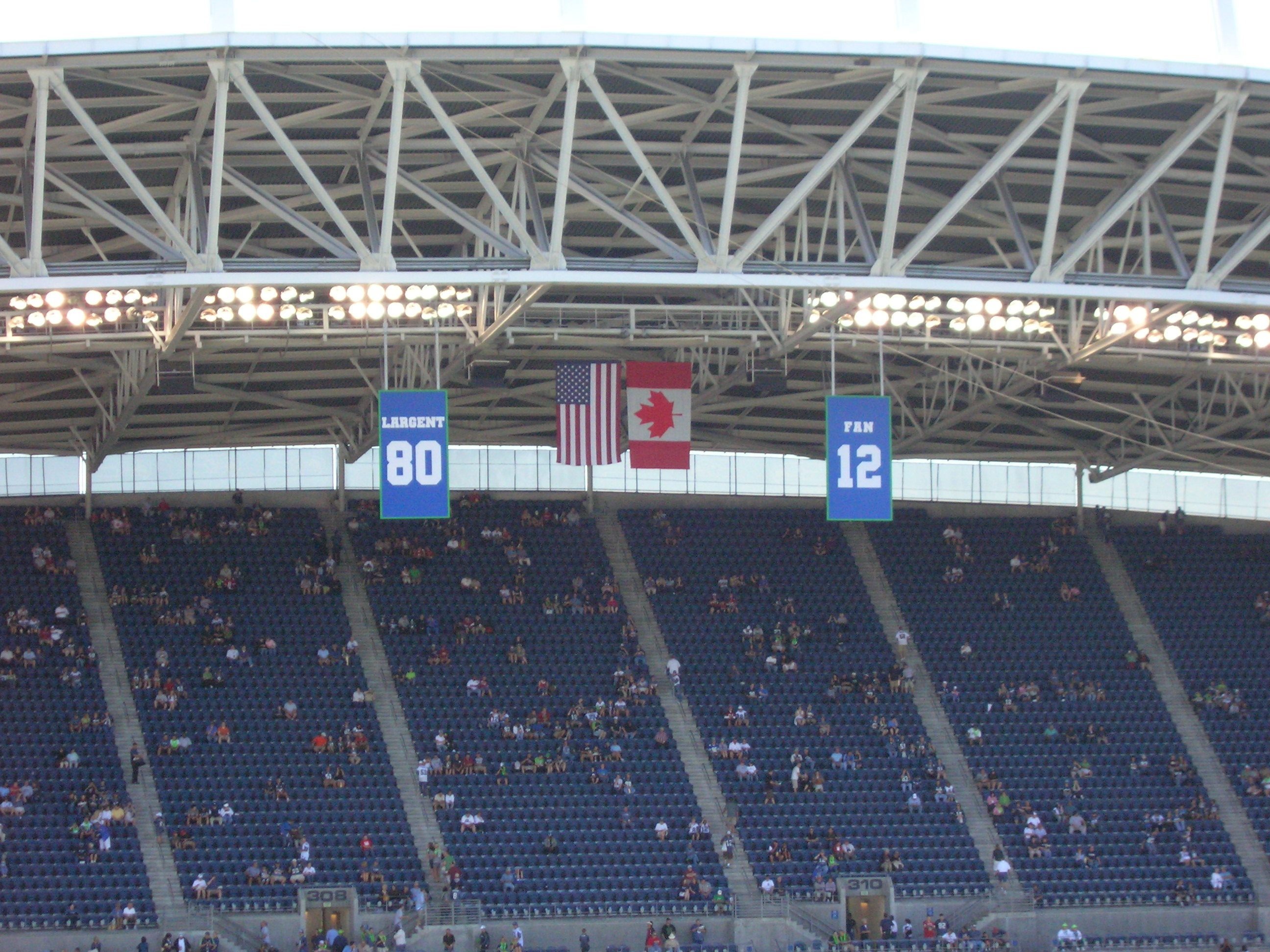
In 1992, Largent became the first Seahawks player to have his number retired. Until 2010, Largent and the 12th Man banner were the only ones retired by the team.

NFL

- NFL Man of the Year (1988)
- 3× First-team All-Pro (1983, 1985, 1987)
- 4× Second-team All-Pro (1978, 1979, 1984, 1986)
- 7× Pro Bowl (1978, 1979, 1981, 1984–1987)
- 2× NFL receiving yards leader (1979, 1985)
- NFL 1980s All-Decade Team
- NFL 100th Anniversary All-Time Team
- PFWA All-Rookie Team (1976)
- Seattle Seahawks 35th Anniversary team
- Seattle Seahawks Top 50 players
- Seattle Seahawks Ring of Honor
- Seattle Seahawks No. 80 retired
- Bart Starr Award (1989)

College

- Second-team All-American (1975)
- Tulsa Golden Hurricane No. 83 retired

== Political career ==
=== Tenure in Congress ===
In 1994, Oklahoma's 1st District Congressman Jim Inhofe resigned to run in a special election to succeed Senator David Boren. Largent won the election to succeed Inhofe in Congress; pursuant to an Oklahoma statute, Governor David Walters designated the special election in which Largent was elected to serve the remainder of Inhofe's term in the 103rd Congress before beginning his term in the 104th Congress.

Largent took office on November 29, 1994, and was reelected to the three succeeding Congresses, never winning less than 60 percent of the vote in the heavily Republican Tulsa-based district.

Like many in the Republican freshman class elected in 1994, when the Republicans took control of the House for the first time in 40 years, Largent's voting record was solidly conservative. Largent was one of the "true believers" in that freshman class, devoting most of his time to issues important to conservative Christians.

One of his first bills was a "parental rights" bill that died in committee after it attracted opposition even from other Christian conservatives. Another of his bills would have abolished the federal tax code at the end of 2001. He opposed ending the 1995 federal government shutdown and played a role in the failed attempt to oust Newt Gingrich as Speaker. Largent introduced a bill that would ban adoptions by gay and lesbian parents in Washington, D. C. Before taking office, in 1993, Largent wrote a letter in which he said "many homosexual practices are immoral and downright repugnant".

He was accused of being anti-Catholic due to his line of questioning of a House of Representatives chaplain in 2000, though he denied this.

After the Republicans lost five seats in the 1998 midterm elections, Largent tried to take advantage of discontent with Majority Leader Dick Armey by challenging Armey for the post. Although Armey was not popular in the Republican caucus, Largent was thought to be far too conservative for the liking of some moderate Republicans, and Armey won on the third ballot. However, when Bob Livingston of Louisiana stood down as Speaker-elect, Armey was still too wounded to make a bid for the job.

=== Run for governor ===
Largent decided to run for governor of Oklahoma in 2002. He easily won the Republican nomination and resigned his House seat on February 15 to devote his energy to the race. Initially seen as an overwhelming favorite against Democratic state senator Brad Henry, Largent lost by just under 7,000 votes.

Largent's loss has been attributed by analysts to factors that included:

- The presence of a well-funded independent (Gary Richardson, a former Republican) on the general election ballot;
- Henry's support of cockfighting, garnering a last minute endorsement by rural cockfighting interests that turned out in large numbers in the election in which the legality of cockfighting was on the ballot;
- Largent used a vulgarity, "bullshit," in response to an Oklahoma City television reporter who repeatedly asked where he was at the time of the September 11, 2001 attacks. Largent had been on a hunting trip and did not know about the attacks until then.

== Post-political career ==
Largent became president and CEO of CTIA-The Wireless Association in November 2003 and served until May 2014. CTIA is an international nonprofit membership organization founded in 1984, representing all sectors of wireless communications: cellular, personal communication services, and enhanced specialized mobile radio.

== Personal life ==
In 1990, Largent received the Golden Plate Award of the American Academy of Achievement.

People magazine named Largent to its 1996 list of "Most Beautiful People".

Largent and his wife Terry have a son Kramer James (b. November 11, 1985) with spina bifida. They also have three older children, sons Kyle and Kelly and daughter Casie.

== Electoral history ==
Oklahoma's 1st congressional district: Results 1994–2000
Year	Republican	Votes	Pct	Democratic	Votes	Pct	3rd party	Party	Votes	Pct
1994	**Steve Largent**	107,085	63%	Stuart Price	63,753	37%				
1996	**Steve Largent**	143,415	68%	Randolph John Amen	57,996	28%	Karla Condray	Independent	8,996	4%
1998	**Steve Largent**	91,031	62%	Howard Plowman	56,309	38%				
2000	**Steve Largent**	138,528	69%	Dan Lowe	58,493	29%	Michael A. Clem	Libertarian	2,984	1%

Summary of the 2002 Oklahoma gubernatorial election results
Candidates	Party	Votes	%
Brad Henry	Democratic Party	448,143	43.27%
Steve Largent	Republican Party	441,277	42.61%
Gary Richardson	Independent	146,200	14.12%
**Total**		**1,035,620**	**100.0%**
Source: 2002 Election Results

U.S. House of Representatives
Preceded by Jim Inhofe	Member of the U.S. House of Representatives from Oklahoma's 1st congressional district 1994–2002	Succeeded by John Sullivan
Party political offices
Preceded by Trent Lott	Response to the State of the Union address 1999; Served alongside: Jennifer Dunn	Succeeded by Susan Collins; Bill Frist
Preceded by Frank Keating	Republican nominee for Governor of Oklahoma; 2002	Succeeded by Ernest Istook
U.S. order of precedence (ceremonial)
Preceded by Jason Chaffetz as Former U.S. Representative	Order of precedence of the United States as Former U.S. Representative	Followed by J. C. Watts as Former U.S. Representative
