= Gary Richardson (lawyer) =

American politician

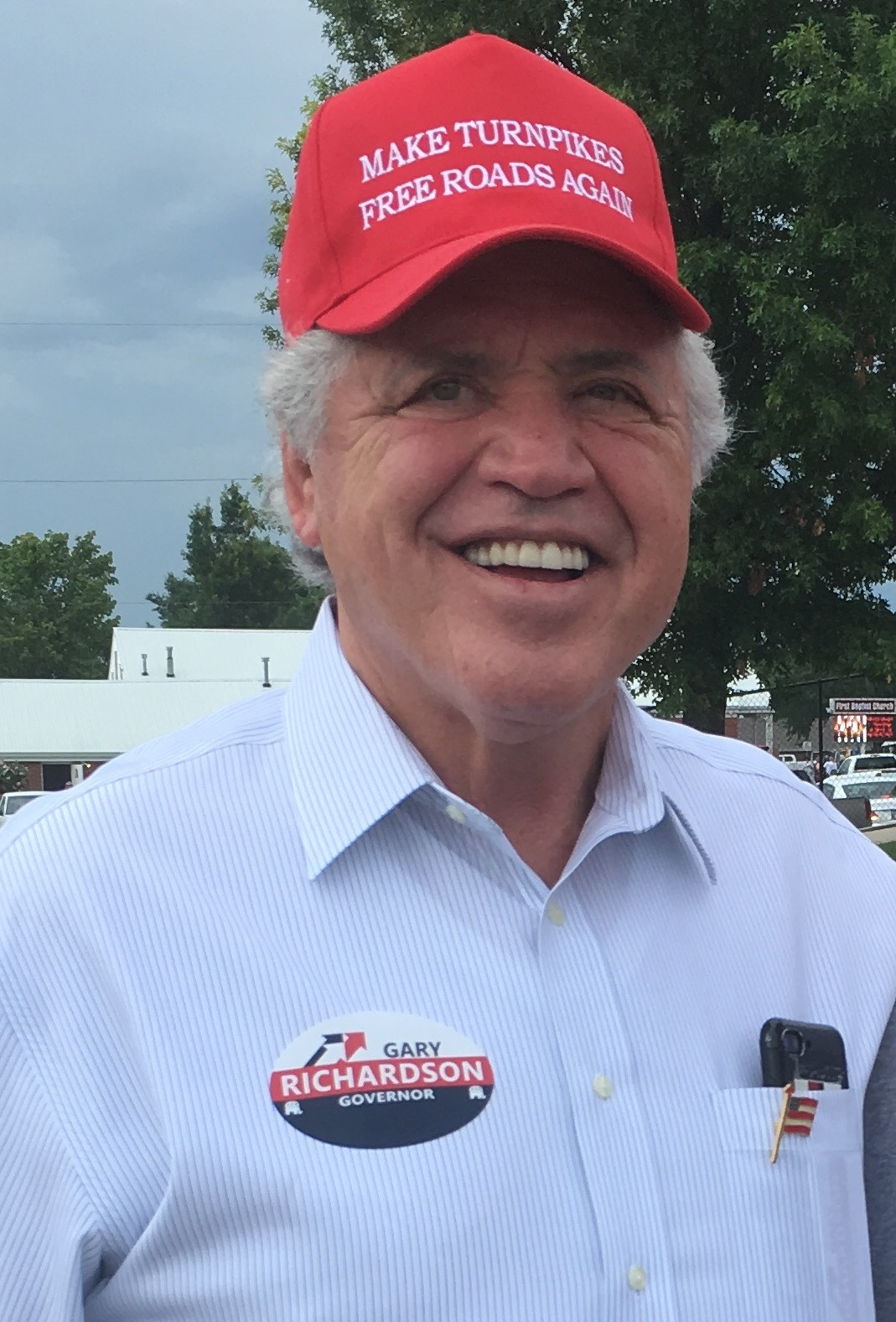

United States Attorney for the Eastern District of Oklahoma
- In office 1981–1984
- President: Ronald Reagan
- Preceded by: Betty O. Williams
- Succeeded by: Donn F. Barker

Personal details
- Born: February 5, 1941 (age 85) Caddo, Oklahoma, US
- Party: Republican (before 2002, 2017–present)
- Other political affiliations: Independent (2002–2017)
- Education: Southern Nazarene University; Oklahoma City University; South Texas College of Law

Gary Richardson (born February 5, 1941) is an American lawyer who was the United States Attorney for the Eastern District of Oklahoma from 1981 to 1984. He is also a perennial candidate for elected office in Oklahoma. As of 2018 he is a partner in the Richardson Law Firm, P.C., a plaintiff law firm in Tulsa.

== Career ==
Richardson attended college at Southern Nazarene University in Bethany, Oklahoma, and graduated with a B.A. degree and a minor in education in 1963. He attended Oklahoma City University School of Law where he was distinguished with the honor of receiving top grades for First Year Law students. He also attended the South Texas College of Law in Houston, Texas, and earned his J.D. in 1972.

Richardson was the Republican nominee for the U.S. House of Representatives in Oklahoma's Second Congressional District in 1978 and 1980, both times losing to Democrat Mike Synar.

Richardson served as the United States Attorney for the Eastern District of Oklahoma from 1981 to 1984. In 1981, along with the U.S. Attorneys for the two other Federal Districts in Oklahoma, Richardson was involved in the prosecution and conviction of 210 County Commissioners who were engaged in a systematic kickback scheme that had been going on for decades.

In 1991 Richardson represented former McLennan County, Texas District Attorney Vic Feazell in a defamation case against Dallas TV station WFAA which resulted in what at that time was the largest libel judgement in U.S. history.

In 2002, Richardson unsuccessfully ran for Governor of Oklahoma as an independent candidate. He came in third behind the winner, Democratic candidate, Brad Henry, and the Republican candidate, former Congressman Steve Largent. Richardson received a total of 146,200 votes (or 14 percent) of the 1,035,620 votes cast (see a table of this result at ).

On April 23, 2017, Richardson announced that he would be running for the Republican nomination for governor in 2018. In April 2018, Richardson faced criticism for a campaign advertisement intended to promote his stance on illegal immigration. The ad referenced the June 2015 death of Bob Barry Jr., a longtime sports anchor at Oklahoma City NBC affiliate KFOR-TV (channel 4) from 1982 until shortly before his death, in an accident in which his motor scooter collided into a car being driven by Gustavo Gutierrez – an undocumented Mexican immigrant who had thrice been deported from the U.S. prior to the accident – who was conducting an illegal U-turn across two southbound lanes at a northwest Oklahoma City intersection. KFOR/KAUT general manager Wes Milbourn noted that the duopoly was obligated to run the ad as it met FCC campaign advertising requirements, but noted that "we were displeased with their advertising tactics and the exploitation of Bob Barry [Jr.]". In a written statement, Barry's son, Matthew H. Barry, said that "the Barry Family finds it deeply concerning that Mr. Richardson chose to feature the tragic and untimely death of our [f]ather in his campaign advertisement without seeking consent. [... W]e find it very troubling that Mr. Richardson ran an advertisement that could imply that the Barry family endorses in any way his election as Governor of the State of Oklahoma. In sum, the Barry family does not appreciate the liberties taken by Mr. Richardson and his campaign; and condemn the utter lack of respect shown towards our tragic loss.” The primary was held on June 26; Richardson placed sixth in a ten-man primary.

Richardson has been an opponent of the Oklahoma Turnpike Authority, calling it corrupt, a "scam on the people on Oklahoma" and wants to abolish it. He has called for independent forensic audits of the Turnpike Authority and then dismantling it. During his failed run in the 2018 Republican primary, he was spotted wearing "Make Turnpikes Free Roads Again" hats, inspired by Trump's "Make America Great Again" hats.

Summary of the 2002 Oklahoma gubernatorial election results
Candidates	Party	Votes	%
Brad Henry	Democratic Party	448,143	43.27%
Steve Largent	Republican Party	441,277	42.61%
Gary Richardson	Independent	146,200	14.12%
Total		1,035,620	100.0%
Source: 2002 Election Results

=== Results ===
Initial primary results by county: Cornett: 40–50%; 30–40%; <30%; Stitt: <30%; 30–40%; Lamb: <30%; 30–40%; 40–50%; Fisher: <30%

2018 Oklahoma Gubernatorial Republican primary results
Party	Candidate	Votes	%
Republican	Mick Cornett	132,806	29.3
Republican	Kevin Stitt	110,479	24.4
Republican	Todd Lamb	107,985	23.9
Republican	Dan Fisher	35,818	7.9
Republican	Gary Jones	25,243	5.6
Republican	Gary Richardson	18,185	4.0
Republican	Blake Stephens	12,211	2.7
Republican	Christopher Barnett	5,240	1.2
Republican	Barry Gowdy	2,347	0.5
Republican	Eric Foutch	2,292	0.5
Total votes		452,606	100.0
