= WAXI =

Rockville, Indiana; United States
- Broadcast area: Terre Haute and Vicinity
- Frequency: 104.9 MHz
- Branding: Giant FM

Programming
- Format: Country
- Affiliations: ABC News Radio; Chicago Cubs Radio Network

Ownership
- Owner: David L. Crooks; (DLC Media, Inc.)

History
- First air date: July 25, 1977

Technical information
- Licensing authority: FCC
- Facility ID: 14232
- Class: A
- ERP: 1,700 watts
- HAAT: 134 meters
- Transmitter coordinates: 39.729°N 87.299°W

Links
- Public license information: Public file; LMS

WAXI (104.9 FM), branded as "Giant FM", is a radio station serving the Terre Haute, Indiana, area with a country music format. It is under ownership of David L. Crooks, through licensee DLC Media, Inc.

WAXI also airs Chicago Cubs baseball games during the Major League Baseball season. In July 2015, local radio icon Barry Kent took over as operations manager and as an on-air personality.

WAXI is also the acronym for the West African Exploration Initiative.

On May 1, 2024, WAXI changed its format from classic hits to country, branded as "Giant FM".
