= WFNF (FM) =

Radio station in Indiana, US

- Brazil, Indiana; United States
- Broadcast area: Terre Haute, Indiana
- Frequency: 92.7 MHz
- Branding: 92.7 The Rock

Programming
- Format: Active rock

Ownership
- Owner: Joey and Kelsey O’Rourke; (JKO Media Group)
- Sister stations: WFNB

History
- First air date: 1972
- Former call signs: WWCM-FM (1972–1979); WBDJ (1979–1985); WSDM-FM (1985–2012); WFNB (2012–2024)
- Former frequencies: 97.7 MHz (1972–2005)

Technical information
- Licensing authority: FCC
- Facility ID: 19670
- Class: A
- ERP: 6,000 watts
- HAAT: 91 meters (299 ft)
- Transmitter coordinates: 39°30′44″N 87°08′18″W

Links
- Public license information: Public file; LMS
- Webcast: Listen live
- Website: 927therock.com

WFNF (92.7 FM) is a commercial radio station licensed to Brazil, Indiana, featuring an active rock format. The studios were located at 1301 Ohio Street in Terre Haute, Indiana, but were moved to 925 Wabash Avenue Suite 300. The building at 13th and Ohio was completely torn down in July 2013.

== History ==
Brazil, Indiana's first radio station went on the air in 1958 as WITE, with a 3-tower directional antenna. In 1972, the AM station reverted to a daytime-only station with one tower, and the call letters, WWCM. This coincided with the construction of FM station WWCM at 97.7 that same year.

The FM station originally operated with 3,000 watts at 97.7 MHz when it signed on in 1972 as WWCM-FM, playing country music. The format changed to album rock in 1979 as WBDJ. However, both WBDJ and its AM sister (1130 WWCM, now WFNB) went silent in 1983 after their owners declared bankruptcy.

The stations were sold in 1985 to Mark Lange of Vincennes, Indiana, and returned to the air with new call letters and formats. 97.7 FM adopted the WSDM calls and an adult contemporary format, which was soon dropped to simulcast with the country format of its AM sister (by then known as WBZL; it became WSDM in 1990 and WSDX in 2000). The FM's power was doubled to 6,000 watts in 1989. WBZL and WSDM were sold in 1990 to Dan Lacy and Mike Petersen (under the name Equity One Media Partners), and on Halloween of that year, WSDM-FM switched format to oldies, utilizing ABC/SMN's Pure Gold satellite service.

The WSDM stations were destroyed by a deliberately set fire on November 22, 1996; the arsonist was immediately apprehended and later sentenced to 18 years in prison. Wisdom 98 was back on the air by the end of the month, although WSDM (AM) remained off the air until the following April. More changes marked 1998 for WSDM-AM-FM, as Dan Lacy and Mike Petersen bought out their fellow shareholders in Equity One Media Partners, creating Crossroads Communications, Inc., and the stations' main offices were moved from Brazil to Terre Haute.

On Halloween of 2005, WSDM-FM moved from 97.7 to 92.7 MHz (swapping frequencies with WCLS in Spencer, which continues to broadcast oldies under the name "Classic Hits 97.7") and adopted a unique country/rock format as "Crock 92.7".

On October 4, 2010, WSDM-FM changed the format to sports radio programming from ESPN Radio, simulcasting WSDX. On September 24, 2012, WSDM-FM split from its simulcast with WSDX and changed the format to adult hits, branded as "92.7 Bob FM" under new call letters WFNB.

Effective December 31, 2012, Emmis Communications Corporation, through licensee Emmis Radio License, LLC, purchased WFNB and sister station WFNF (the former WSDM AM) from Crossroads for $335,000.

On April 17, 2014, WFNB changed its format to hot adult contemporary, branded as "B92.7". On March 1, 2016, WFNB added Elvis Duran and the Morning Show and Kyle West to the programming lineup.

On January 30, 2017, Dave Crooks' DLC Media took over ownership of WFNB and switched the format from hot adult contemporary to a temporary simulcast of oldies-formatted WAXI, until new studios are built; the station announced plans to launch a soft AC format branded as "Lite 92.7". The new format launched at 2 p.m. on May 12, 2017.

On February 15, 2019, WFNB changed its format from soft AC to active rock, branded as "92.7 The Rock".

In 2021 it was announced 105.5 Jack-FM would change formats along with other DLC radio stations. While The Bob and Tom Show moved to WFNB, the station's format did not change.

In 2024, after DLC Media sold WFNB and AM 1130 (by then WAMB) to Joey and Kelsey O’Rourke's JKO Media for $875,000, the WFNB call sign was moved to the AM station; 92.7 then became WFNF, with no change in format.
