= Bosque River =

River in McLennon County Texas, United States

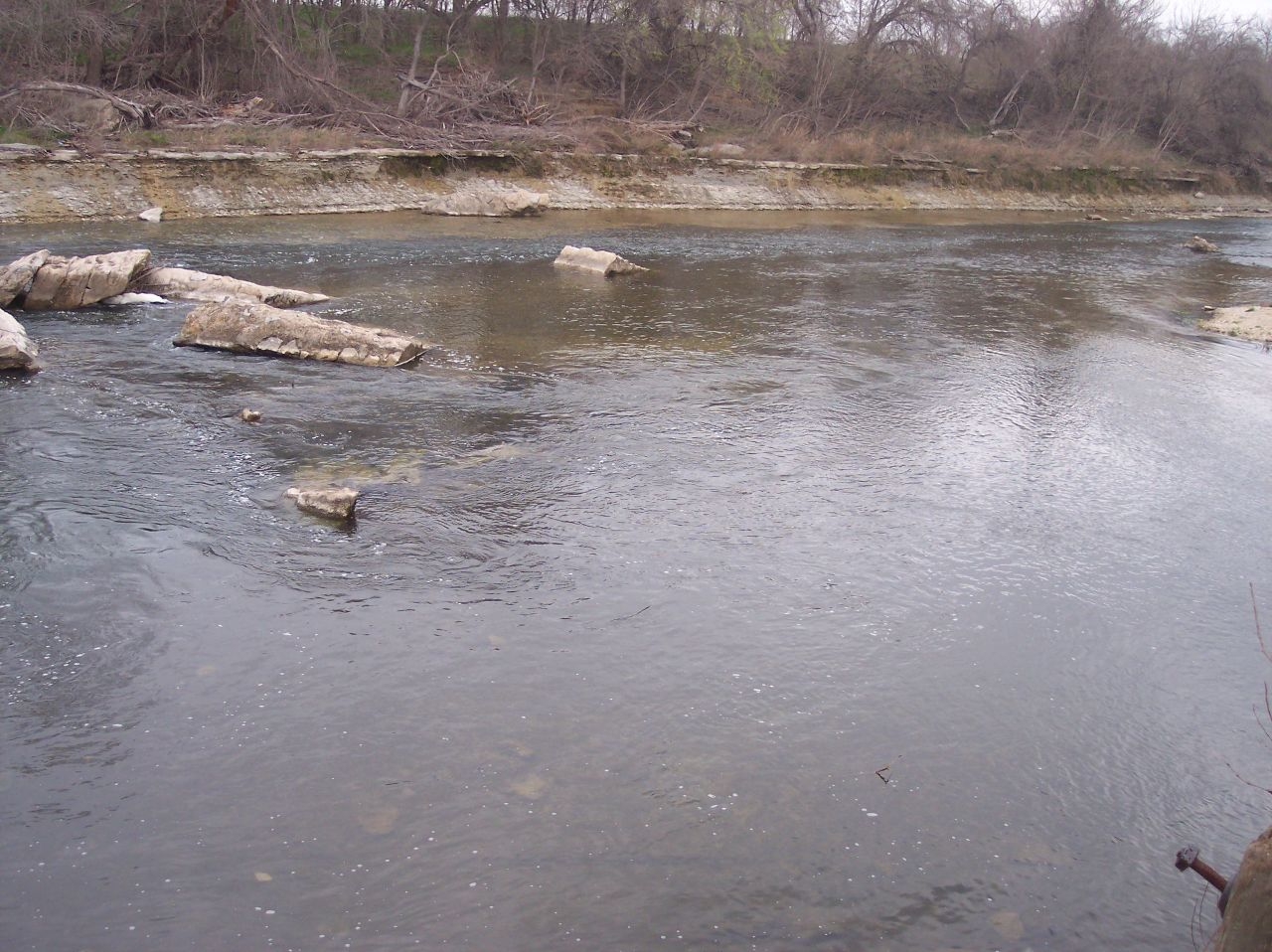
- Bosque River, March 2004, Texas, United States

Location
- Country: United States
- State: Texas
- County: McLennan

Physical characteristics
- Mouth
  - location: Brazos River
  - coordinates: 31.58905°N 97.15500°W

The Bosque River (/ˈbɒski/ BOS-kee) is a 115-mile-long (185.1 km) river in Central Texas fed by four primary branches. The longest branch, the North Bosque, forms near Stephenville and flows toward Waco through Hamilton, Bosque, and McLennan Counties. It is subsequently joined by the East Bosque in Bosque County and the Middle and South Bosque Rivers near Waco. The river terminates into the Brazos River and is dammed nearby to form Lake Waco.

The Middle Bosque River adjoins the Prairie Chapel Ranch home of President George W. Bush northwest of Crawford, Texas.

== Recent controversy ==
The City of Waco has been involved in a protracted lawsuit with Erath County dairies since 2004. The city alleges that the dairies have been negligent in allowing excess phosphorus from cattle waste to enter the river in large quantities, traveling downstream and causing algal blooms in Lake Waco. As the lake functions as the Waco area's primary source of drinking water, residents have complained for years about an unpleasant resultant taste and smell.

== See also ==
- List of rivers of Texas
- Waco Mammoth Site
