= 2002 Oklahoma gubernatorial election =

- November 5, 2002
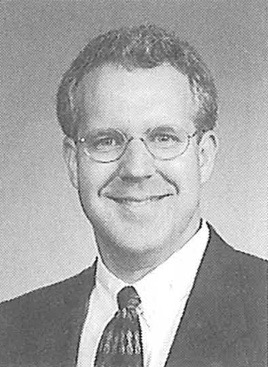

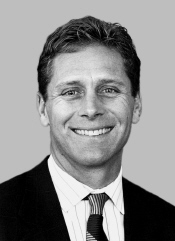

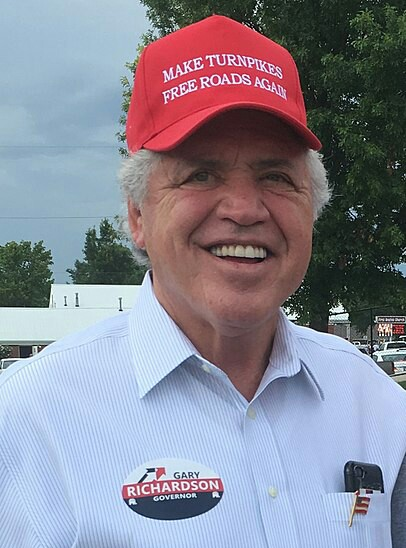
Nominee	Brad Henry	Steve Largent	Gary Richardson
Party	Democratic	Republican	Independent
Popular vote	448,143	441,277	146,200
Percentage	43.27%	42.61%	14.12%
- Henry: 30–40% 40–50% 50–60% 60–70% 70–80% 80–90% Largent: 30–40% 40–50% 50–60% 60–70% 70–80% 80–90% Tie: 50% No votes
Governor before election
Frank Keating
Republican
Elected Governor
Brad Henry
Democratic

The 2002 Oklahoma gubernatorial election was held on November 5, 2002, to elect the governor of Oklahoma. Democrat Brad Henry won the election with 43 percent of the vote, defeating Republican Steve Largent and conservative independent Gary Richardson.

Henry's narrow win has been attributed to Richardson and Largent's split of the conservative vote and the inclusion of a cockfighting ban on the ballot, an issue which brought opponents of the referendum from Southeastern Oklahoma, a traditional Democratic stronghold that strongly supported Henry, out to vote.

This was the last time that a gubernatorial nominee and a lieutenant gubernatorial nominee of different political parties were simultaneously elected in Oklahoma to date.

== Background ==
Though Democrats had dominated state politics for most of Oklahoma's history, the Oklahoma Republican Party had made historic gains, including five of the state's six Congressional seats at the time of the election. This made it especially hard for Henry to win with a growing Republican dominance in the state. This was most notable in the urban areas of Oklahoma City and Tulsa, both of which voted for Largent.

== Democratic primary ==
Three state legislators sought the Democratic Party nomination, trailing Vince Orza, who had previously sought the governor's office as a Republican, only to be defeated by Bill Price in the primary runoff. State Senator Brad Henry advanced to the runoff with 28% against Orza's 44%, but opposition to the former Republican from New York coalesced behind Henry. Orza found himself once again losing the runoff after winning the initial primary.

=== Primary results ===
Democratic primary results
Party	Candidate	Votes	%
Democratic	Vince Orza	154,263	44.03%
Democratic	Brad Henry	99,883	28.51%
Democratic	Kelly Haney	59,044	16.85%
Democratic	Jim Dunegan	28,130	8.03%
Democratic	James E. Lamkin	9,069	2.59%
Total votes		350,389	100.00%

=== Runoff primary results ===
Democratic runoff primary results
Party	Candidate	Votes	%
Democratic	Brad Henry	135,336	52.42%
Democratic	Vince Orza	122,855	47.58%
Total votes		258,191	100.00%

== Republican primary ==
Steve Largent easily won the GOP nomination against token opposition.

=== Primary results ===
Republican primary results
Party	Candidate	Votes	%
Republican	Steve Largent	179,631	87.25%
Republican	Jim Denny	16,713	8.12%
Republican	Andrew Marr, Jr	9,532	4.63%
Total votes		205,876	100.00%

== General election ==
=== Predictions ===
Source	Ranking	As of
The Cook Political Report	Likely R	October 31, 2002
Sabato's Crystal Ball	Lean R	November 4, 2002

=== Polling ===
Poll source	Date(s) administered	Sample size (Note: Key: A – all adults RV – registered voters LV – likely voters V – unclear)	Margin of error	Brad Henry (D)	Steve Largent (R)	Gary Richardson (I)	Other / Undecided
SurveyUSA	November 1–3, 2002	710 (LV)	± 3.8%	42%	38%	17%	3%

=== Results ===
This election was extremely close, with Henry prevailing by just 6,866 votes or 0.6%. Under Oklahoma law, if the margin of victory is less than one percent but greater than half a percent, the losing candidate can request a recount that their campaign has to pay for. However, Largent ultimately decided against it, considering that because Henry led by 6,866 votes, the chances of him prevailing were extremely unlikely. On November 23, Largent officially conceded defeat. Two days later on November 25, Oklahoma Secretary of State Kay Dudley certified the results, declaring Henry the governor-elect.

2002 Oklahoma gubernatorial election
Party	Candidate	Votes	%	±%
Democratic	Brad Henry	448,143	43.27%	+2.34%
Republican	Steve Largent	441,277	42.61%	−15.25%
Independent	Gary Richardson	146,200	14.12%	
Total votes		1,035,620	100.00%	
Plurality		6,866	0.66%	
Democratic gain from Republican		Swing	+17.60%	

=== Results by county ===
County	Brad Henry Democratic		Steve Largent Republican		Gary Richardson Independent		Margin		Total votes cast
County	#	%	#	%	#	%	#	%	Total votes cast
Adair	2,803	46.32%	2,374	39.23%	874	14.44%	429	7.09%	6,051
Alfalfa	782	38.28%	964	47.19%	297	14.54%	-182	-8.91%	2,043
Atoka	2,429	63.57%	1,211	31.69%	181	4.74%	1,218	31.88%	3,821
Beaver	561	28.38%	1,297	65.60%	119	6.02%	-736	-37.23%	1,977
Beckham	2,511	47.69%	2,105	39.98%	649	12.33%	406	7.71%	5,265
Blaine	1,554	45.81%	1,285	37.88%	553	16.30%	269	7.93%	3,392
Bryan	6,158	61.81%	3,422	34.35%	383	3.84%	2,736	27.46%	9,963
Caddo	3,948	50.93%	2,341	30.20%	1,463	18.87%	1,607	20.73%	7,752
Canadian	9,658	33.81%	14,422	50.49%	4,485	15.70%	-4,764	-16.68%	28,565
Carter	7,099	52.75%	5,458	40.56%	900	6.69%	1,641	12.19%	13,457
Cherokee	6,549	51.16%	3,731	29.15%	2,520	19.69%	2,818	22.02%	12,800
Choctaw	2,472	63.91%	1,183	30.58%	213	5.51%	1,289	33.32%	3,868
Cimarron	298	23.26%	909	70.96%	74	5.78%	-611	-47.70%	1,281
Cleveland	28,112	43.05%	29,160	44.66%	8,022	12.29%	-1,048	-1.61%	65,294
Coal	1,360	66.47%	554	27.08%	132	6.45%	806	39.39%	2,046
Comanche	8,363	38.40%	9,077	41.68%	4,340	19.93%	-714	-3.28%	21,780
Cotton	799	43.21%	717	38.78%	333	18.01%	82	4.43%	1,849
Craig	2,253	49.92%	1,409	31.22%	851	18.86%	844	18.70%	4,513
Creek	8,385	41.90%	7,497	37.46%	4,132	20.65%	888	4.44%	20,014
Custer	3,426	42.60%	3,438	42.75%	1,179	14.66%	-12	-0.15%	8,043
Delaware	4,845	44.75%	4,253	39.29%	1,728	15.96%	592	5.47%	10,826
Dewey	820	44.40%	744	40.28%	283	15.32%	76	4.11%	1,847
Ellis	633	38.55%	739	45.01%	270	16.44%	-106	-6.46%	1,642
Garfield	6,421	36.55%	8,381	47.70%	2,767	15.75%	-1,960	-11.16%	17,569
Garvin	4,525	51.05%	3,064	34.57%	1,275	14.38%	1,461	16.48%	8,864
Grady	6,291	43.74%	5,583	38.82%	2,509	17.44%	708	4.92%	14,383
Grant	875	40.87%	941	43.95%	325	15.18%	-66	-3.08%	2,141
Greer	957	49.36%	651	33.57%	331	17.07%	306	15.78%	1,939
Harmon	446	50.17%	310	34.87%	133	14.96%	136	15.30%	889
Harper	594	41.77%	642	45.15%	186	13.08%	-48	-3.38%	1,422
Haskell	2,516	60.05%	1,165	27.80%	509	12.15%	1,351	32.24%	4,190
Hughes	2,355	57.36%	1,173	28.57%	578	14.08%	1,182	28.79%	4,106
Jackson	2,363	37.48%	3,156	50.06%	785	12.45%	-793	-12.58%	6,304
Jefferson	1,057	53.71%	756	38.41%	155	7.88%	301	15.29%	1,968
Johnston	2,280	66.84%	990	29.02%	141	4.13%	1,290	37.82%	3,411
Kay	6,071	38.88%	7,264	46.52%	2,279	14.60%	-1,193	-7.64%	15,614
Kingfisher	1,767	36.05%	2,426	49.50%	708	14.45%	-659	-13.45%	4,901
Kiowa	1,742	55.92%	1,000	32.10%	373	11.97%	742	23.82%	3,115
Latimer	1,984	60.58%	914	27.91%	377	11.51%	1,070	32.67%	3,275
Le Flore	6,941	58.29%	4,468	37.52%	499	4.19%	2,473	20.77%	11,908
Lincoln	4,935	43.72%	4,251	37.66%	2,103	18.63%	684	6.06%	11,289
Logan	4,245	37.71%	5,048	44.84%	1,964	17.45%	-803	-7.13%	11,257
Love	1,753	64.17%	884	32.36%	95	3.48%	869	31.81%	2,732
Major	907	32.45%	1,490	53.31%	398	14.24%	-583	-20.86%	2,795
Marshall	2,694	63.12%	1,402	32.85%	172	4.03%	1,292	30.27%	4,268
Mayes	6,460	51.82%	4,025	32.29%	1,981	15.89%	2,435	19.53%	12,466
McClain	4,102	42.06%	4,115	42.19%	1,536	15.75%	-13	-0.13%	9,753
McCurtain	5,187	59.97%	3,035	35.09%	427	4.94%	2,152	24.88%	8,649
McIntosh	3,631	53.42%	1,809	26.61%	1,357	19.96%	1,822	26.81%	6,797
Murray	2,662	59.82%	1,325	29.78%	463	10.40%	1,337	30.04%	4,450
Muskogee	9,867	48.67%	6,132	30.25%	4,275	21.09%	3,735	18.42%	20,274
Noble	1,757	41.56%	1,767	41.79%	704	16.65%	-10	-0.24%	4,228
Nowata	1,718	46.84%	1,241	33.83%	709	19.33%	477	13.00%	3,668
Okfuskee	1,932	55.04%	976	27.81%	602	17.15%	956	27.24%	3,510
Oklahoma	73,236	38.73%	91,270	48.27%	24,570	12.99%	-18,034	-9.54%	189,076
Okmulgee	5,823	52.28%	3,341	30.00%	1,974	17.72%	2,482	22.28%	11,138
Osage	6,843	49.28%	4,696	33.82%	2,347	16.90%	2,147	15.46%	13,886
Ottawa	4,508	52.04%	3,018	34.84%	1,136	13.11%	1,490	17.20%	8,662
Pawnee	2,251	45.30%	1,814	36.51%	904	18.19%	437	8.79%	4,969
Payne	8,714	43.56%	8,697	43.47%	2,595	12.97%	17	0.08%	20,006
Pittsburg	8,035	54.93%	4,686	32.03%	1,908	13.04%	3,349	22.89%	14,629
Pontotoc	5,447	52.08%	3,904	37.33%	1,107	10.59%	1,543	14.75%	10,458
Pottawatomie	11,262	55.12%	6,975	34.14%	2,194	10.74%	4,287	20.98%	20,431
Pushmataha	2,336	61.86%	1,119	29.63%	321	8.50%	1,217	32.23%	3,776
Roger Mills	614	42.91%	632	44.16%	185	12.93%	-18	-1.26%	1,431
Rogers	10,508	42.10%	10,264	41.13%	4,184	16.76%	243	0.97%	24,957
Seminole	4,260	57.19%	2,307	30.97%	882	11.84%	1,953	26.22%	7,449
Sequoyah	5,158	54.79%	3,391	36.02%	865	9.19%	1,767	18.77%	9,414
Stephens	5,484	38.47%	6,290	44.12%	2,482	17.41%	-806	-5.65%	14,256
Texas	1,424	28.98%	3,208	65.28%	282	5.74%	-1,784	-36.30%	4,914
Tillman	1,263	47.93%	1,034	39.24%	338	12.83%	229	8.69%	2,635
Tulsa	65,383	37.42%	84,187	48.18%	25,158	14.40%	-18,804	-10.76%	174,728
Wagoner	7,320	39.37%	7,595	40.85%	3,676	19.77%	-275	-1.48%	18,591
Washington	5,801	33.75%	8,700	50.62%	2,687	15.63%	-2,899	-16.87%	17,188
Washita	1,810	47.58%	1,440	37.85%	554	14.56%	370	9.73%	3,804
Woods	1,471	46.51%	1,339	42.33%	353	11.16%	132	4.17%	3,163
Woodward	2,339	40.09%	2,695	46.19%	801	13.73%	-356	-6.10%	5,835
Totals	448,143	43.27%	441,277	42.61%	146,200	14.12%	6,866	0.66%	1,035,620

==== Counties that flipped from Republican to Democratic ====
- Beckham (largest city: Elk City)
- Blaine (largest city: Watonga)
- Bryan (largest city: Durant)
- Caddo (largest city: Anadarko)
- Carter (largest city: Ardmore)
- Cotton (largest city: Walters)
- Creek (largest city: Sapulpa)
- Delaware (largest city: Grove)
- Dewey (largest city: Seiling)
- Garvin (largest city: Pauls Valley)
- Grady (largest city: Chickasaw)
- Greer (largest city: Mangum)
- Harmon (largest city: Hollis)
- Jefferson (largest city: Waurika)
- Kiowa (largest city: Hobart)
- Lincoln (largest city: Chandler)
- Love (largest city: Marietta)
- Marshall (largest city: Madill)
- Murray (largest city: Sulphur)
- Nowata (largest city: Nowata)
- Payne (largest city: Stillwater)
- Pontotoc (largest city: Ada)
- Pottawatomie (largest city: Shawnee)
- Rogers (largest city: Claremore)
- Washita (largest city: New Cordell)
- Woods (largest city: Alva)

=== By congressional district ===
Henry won two of five congressional districts, including one that elected a Republican.

District	Henry	Largent	Richardson	Representative
1st	37.37%	47.43%	15.20%	John Sullivan
2nd	52.98%	33.22%	13.80%	Brad Carson
3rd	41.05%	43.19%	15.75%	Wes Watkins (107th Congress)
3rd	41.05%	43.19%	15.75%	Frank Lucas (108th Congress)
4th	44.28%	42.02%	13.70%	J. C. Watts (107th Congress)
4th	44.28%	42.02%	13.70%	Tom Cole (108th Congress)
5th	40.95%	46.29%	12.77%	Ernest Istook
