= Linda Thompson (attorney) =

American attorney, conspiracy theorist and pro-gun activist

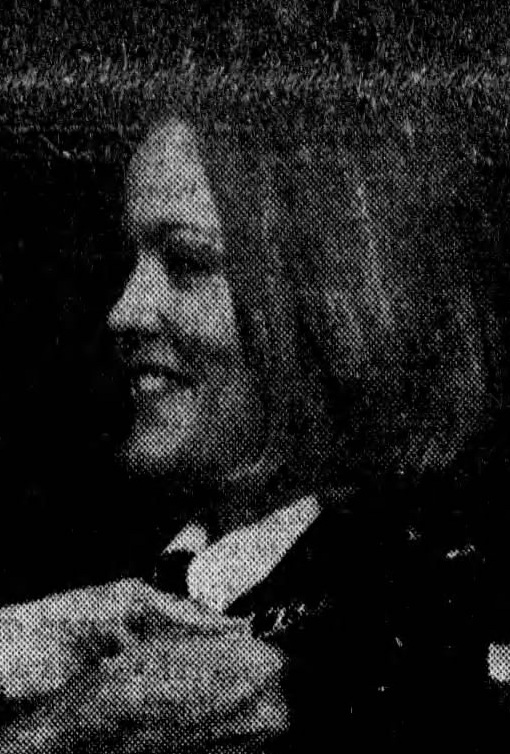
- Thompson in 1976
- Born: April 26, 1953; Atlanta, Georgia, U.S.
- Died: May 10, 2009 (aged 56); St. Petersburg, Florida, U.S.
- Occupation: Lawyer

Linda Thompson (April 26, 1953 – May 10, 2009), born Linda Diane Capps, was an American lawyer, militia movement supporter and conspiracy theorist. In 1993, she quit her job as a lawyer in Indianapolis, Indiana, to start the American Justice Federation, a non-profit group that promoted pro-gun causes through a shortwave radio program, a computer bulletin board system, and sales of its newsletter and videos. She died of a prescription drug overdose in 2009.

== Conspiracy theories ==
=== Clinton body count ===
Thompson was opposed to the Bill Clinton presidency. In 1994, Thompson helped compile a list of 24 people with some connection to Clinton who had died "under other than natural circumstances". The list was included in a letter to the Congressional Record by former Rep. William Dannemeyer who called for hearings on the matter. It cited an article in U.S. News & World Report (August 8, 1994) by Greg Ferguson and David Bowermaster: "Whatever it is, Bill Clinton Likely Did It." According to them, the original list was called "The Clinton Body Count: Coincidence or the Kiss of Death?" They wrote that "Thompson admits she has 'no direct evidence' of Clinton killing anyone. Indeed, she says the deaths were probably caused by 'people trying to control the president' but refuses to say who they were."

=== Waco siege conspiracy ===
In 1993, she produced a videotape entitled Waco, the Big Lie, which contained footage of the siege of the Branch Davidian compound in Waco, Texas, and a history of the community. The videotape was distributed widely, and for a short period after its release, she was a regular guest on talk radio shows. The film challenged the mainstream news reports of the Branch Davidian siege and created a small sensation, alleging a government cover-up of the events surrounding the siege. Thompson pointed out many inconsistencies in the official story and the government reports and the hypocrisy of using deadly weapons to "rescue" children from their parents.

Thompson also claimed that three Bureau of Alcohol, Tobacco, and Firearms agents, whom she alleges were killed by friendly fire during the siege, were all former bodyguards of then-President Clinton and that the friendly fire was actually an assassination ordered by Clinton.

In 1994, Thompson produced Waco II, the Big Lie Continues, in which she offered rebuttals to criticisms of her first film.

=== Black helicopters and FEMA camp allegations ===
She made a third film in 1994, America Under Siege accusing the government of using "black helicopters" against patriots, and the Federal Emergency Management Agency (FEMA) of establishing concentration camps, facilities she claimed were to prevent patriots from interfering with plans to establish a "New World Order". The supposed FEMA Camp was the Beech Grove Shops, an Amtrak repair facility in Beech Grove, Indiana.

== Proposed march on Washington ==
In 1994, Thompson declared herself "Acting Adjutant General" of the "Unorganized Militia of the United States" and announced plans for an armed march on Washington, D.C., in September of that year. She declared that militiamen would arrest and try for treason in "Citizen's Courts" those Congressional representatives not living up to their oath of office. The proposed march was almost immediately denounced by groups on the right wing, including the John Birch Society, and Thompson subsequently canceled the march. Later, she was arrested for blocking a Presidential motorcade in Indianapolis. She carried one concealed weapon and had another in her purse. Both guns were legal, and no charges were filed.

== Death ==
Thompson died in St. Petersburg, Florida, on May 10, 2009, after overdosing on medication. Her ashes were scattered in the Gulf of Mexico by her husband in accordance with her last wishes.

The medication was posted to her by the United States Department of Veterans Affairs (VA). A lawsuit was lodged on the grounds Thompson had a history of depression and suicidal threats since 2005 but was still mailed a three-month supply of painkillers. Thompson's brother, Stephen Capps, said that the VA should have known better than to send her that much medication.

== See also ==
- Waco siege
- List of conspiracy theories
- Militia organizations in the United States
- Patriot movement
