= Wacol (disambiguation) =

Wacol is a suburb in the City of Brisbane, Queensland, Australia.

Wacol may als refer to:

- Wacol railway station, Brisbane, a railway station on the Ipswich railway line in Queensland
- Wacol Prison, another name for the Sir David Longland Correctional Centre

== See also ==
- Waco (disambiguation)
