= Dave Crooks =

American politician

David L. Crooks

Member of the Indiana State Assembly from the 63rd district
- In office November 6, 1996 – November 5, 2008
- Preceded by: Donald Eugene Hume
- Succeeded by: Mark Messmer

Personal details
- Born: December 13, 1963 (age 62) Sullivan, Indiana, U.S.
- Party: Democratic
- Spouse: Shelley Crooks (m. 2007)
- Occupation: Radio station owner

Dave Crooks (born December 13, 1963) was the Chairman of the Indiana Democratic Party's 8th Congressional District committee (2023–26), former member of the Indiana House of Representatives, where he represented the 63rd District from 1996 to 2008 and a former commercial radio station owner.

== Early life, education, and business career ==
Crooks was born in Sullivan County, Indiana and raised in Graysville. He grew up in a working-class household, where his brother was a mine worker, his mother and sister were steel workers, and his father was a machinist. Crooks entered the work force at the age of nine at a gas station down the street from his family's home.

Crooks began working at his first radio station, 1550-AM WNDI, at age 17 and eventually went on to later own stations in Daviess, Vigo, Clay and Parke County in Indiana and Lawrence County in Illinois. In 2024 Crooks retired from radio broadcasting, selling off his six stations WAKO (AM), WAKO-FM, WAXI, WVIG (FM), WFNB (AM), and WAMB

== Indiana House of Representatives ==
=== Elections ===
Crooks was first elected to the 63rd House District in the Indiana House of Representatives in 1996. In 2002, he won re-election unopposed. In 2004, he won re-election with 51% of the vote. In 2006, he won re-election with 62% of the vote. In 2008, Crooks choose not to seek re-election and was replaced by current Rep. Mark Messmer (R) who defeated his Democratic opponent with 57% of the vote.

=== Committee assignments ===
During his time in the general assembly, Crooks served as Chairman of the Commerce and Utilities Committee and as Chairman of the Insurance and Small Business Committee. He was appointed to the position of Assistant Minority Whip.

== 2012 congressional election ==
In May 2011 Dave Crooks announced his candidacy to represent Indiana's 8th Congressional District in the United States Congress. He will face Republican incumbent Larry Bucshon in the general election.

On December 10, 2011, Crooks was endorsed by the 8th District Democratic Central Committee. Crooks and his primary opponent, Patrick Scates, had agreed before the caucus that whoever lost the endorsement would drop out of the race and endorse the winner.

The vote results were Crooks, Dave (Democratic) 122325 Gadau, Bart (Libertarian) 10134 Bucshon, Larry D. (Republican) 151533

== Indiana Democratic party 8th congressional district chair ==
Crooks was appointed chair of the Indiana Democratic Party 8th congressional district committee in 2023.

In 2026 Crooks failed to file the paperwork for a state senate candidate to appear on the ballot. The Democratic candidate who won the primary election had withdrawn, so a new candidate was selected on July 23 by party precinct officials. This snafu left the Republican candidate uncontested. Crooks then resigned as 8th district chair.

== Personal life ==
Crooks is single and lives in Terre Haute, Indiana. He has a son, Jared, and daughter MacKenzie.
