= John Dunning (true crime author) =

American writer

John Dunning (1918 – March 1990) was an American journalist and true crime author.

== Early life ==
Born in Grand Rapids, Michigan, U.S., his father disappeared and his mother Chrystal was left to bring him up alone. Needing to work, she gave him to the couple who had brought her up as an orphan. They were "dirt farmers" in Michigan and were in their 60s when they took her son.

Dunning joined the U.S. Navy in San Diego at the age of 16, his foster parents having died. He served in the Asian and Pacific fleets and spent time in the merchant navy before settling in Shanghai, where he married a Chinese woman. There he became a lieutenant of police in the British sector of the city (at that time divided between the United States, France, Britain and Japan). When the Japanese invaded China and Shanghai, he remained in his post as a non-combatant until 1941, when the United States entered the war. He was then interned in the Lunghua prison camp where he became the representative of the prison population. He spent four years as a prisoner of war.

After the Japanese surrender, he received the sword of the camp commandant. He worked for the U.S. intelligence agency OSS. He met his second wife, Elizaveta Maximovna Smoleff, in another prison camp. They were married in the Russian Orthodox church in Shanghai in 1946.

== Return to the United States ==
In 1949, with the victory of the Communists under Mao Zedong, the family, now with one child, were obliged to leave China and arrived in the United States with nothing. After a succession of jobs, Dunning's second child was born in Connersville, Indiana and the family finally moved to St. Petersburg, Florida.

There Dunning became a boat builder and entrepreneur but fell afoul of the Internal Revenue Service and left the United States forever in 1959.

== Writing career ==
The family settled in Heidelberg, Germany and Dunning became a journalist for a local English language news sheet, and then an author.

In 1966 he moved to Paris, and then to Luxembourg in 1972. Dunning became an established author in the true crime genre and used many European cases in his articles for American true crime magazines. His friend Colin Wilson in England persuaded him to publish his stories in book collections.

Dunning held strong views on crimes against children and frequently advocated the death penalty for such criminals in the forewords of his books. His total sales exceeded 15 million and his works were translated into many languages. His taking of Luxembourg nationality made him, by far, Luxembourg's most prolific author.

== Death ==
John Dunning died in Luxembourg in March 1990, leaving his wife, two daughters and two grandchildren. A third grandchild was born in 1991.

== Works ==
- Strange Deaths (1981), London, Arrow Books, ISBN 0 09 941660 3.
- Carnal Crimes (1983), London, Arrow Books, ISBN 0 09 957340 7
- Mindless Murders (1983), London, Arrow Books
- Murderous Women (1983), London, Arrow Books, ISBN 1 85 958494 2
- Truly Murderous (1992), London, Arrow Books
- A Chilling catalogue of Mysterious murders Cryptic Crimes, London, Arrow Books, ISBN 0 09 972680 7
- Mysterious Murders (1993), London, Arrow Books, ISBN 1 87 312323 X
- Mystical Murders (1994), London, Arrow Books, ISBN 0 09 963530 5
- Deadly Deviates (1995), London, Arrow Books, ISBN 0 09 945280 4
- Madly Murderous, London, Arrow Books
- Occult Murders, London, Arrow Books, ISBN 1 85 958496 9
- Violent Murders, ISBN 1 87 312308 6
- The Arbor House Treasury of True Crime. Introduction by Colin Wilson. Arbor House, 1981. ISBN 0877956790
