= Waco, the Big Lie =

1993 documentary film by Linda Thompson

- The film claims that footage shows a tank with a flamethrower (circled), however it's been claimed that this footage has been manipulated.
- Directed by: Linda Thompson
- Production company: American Justice Federation
- Release date: 1993
- Running time: 31 minutes
- Country: United States
- Language: English

Waco, the Big Lie is a 1993 American documentary film directed by Linda Thompson that presents video-based analysis regarding the Waco siege. The first film made about the Waco siege, Waco, the Big Lie gained significant notoriety when it was viewed during the trial of American domestic terrorist Timothy McVeigh. As part of the defense, McVeigh's lawyers showed Waco, the Big Lie to the jury.

In 1994, the film was followed by a feature-length sequel titled Waco II, the Big Lie Continues, aimed at addressing criticisms of the original.

Thompson's films claimed that footage of an armored vehicle breaking through the outer walls of the compound showed a flamethrower attached to the vehicle, setting fire to the building. Thompson worked from a VHS copy of the surveillance tape.

John Young of the Waco Tribune-Herald criticized the film.
