= WAKO (AM) =

- Lawrenceville, Illinois; United States
- Frequency: 910 kHz
- Branding: Giant FM

Programming
- Format: Country
- Affiliations: ABC News Radio

Ownership
- Owner: David Crooks; (DLC Media, Inc.)
- Sister stations: WAKO-FM

History
- First air date: June 9, 1959

Technical information
- Licensing authority: FCC
- Facility ID: 36788
- Class: D
- Power: 500 watts day; 50 watts night
- Transmitter coordinates: 38°43′23.00″N 87°39′13.00″W
- Translator: 99.3 W257DW (Lawrenceville)

Links
- Public license information: Public file; LMS

WAKO (910 kHz) is an AM radio station airing a country music format. Licensed to Lawrenceville, Illinois, United States, the station is owned by Scott Huber and Johnny McCrory, through 3 Towers Broadcasting.

== History ==
On April 2, 2017, WAKO split off its simulcast of adult contemporary sister station WAKO-FM and launched as "The Legend", with a classic country format.

On May 3, 2024, WAKO changed its format from classic country to country, branded as "Giant FM".

== logo ==
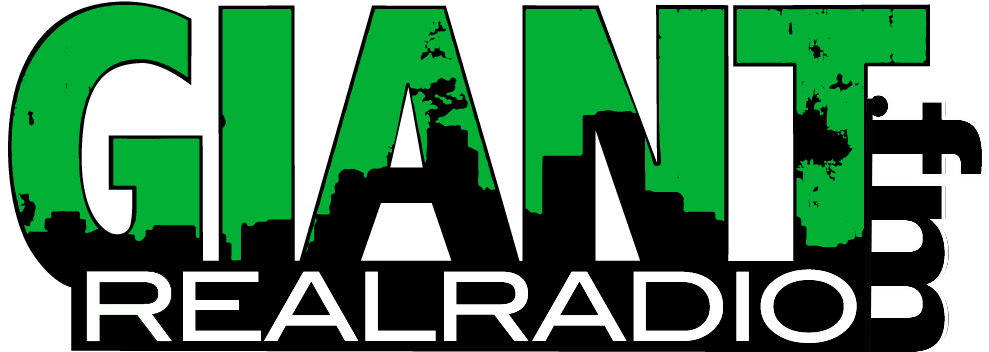
