= Lake Waco =

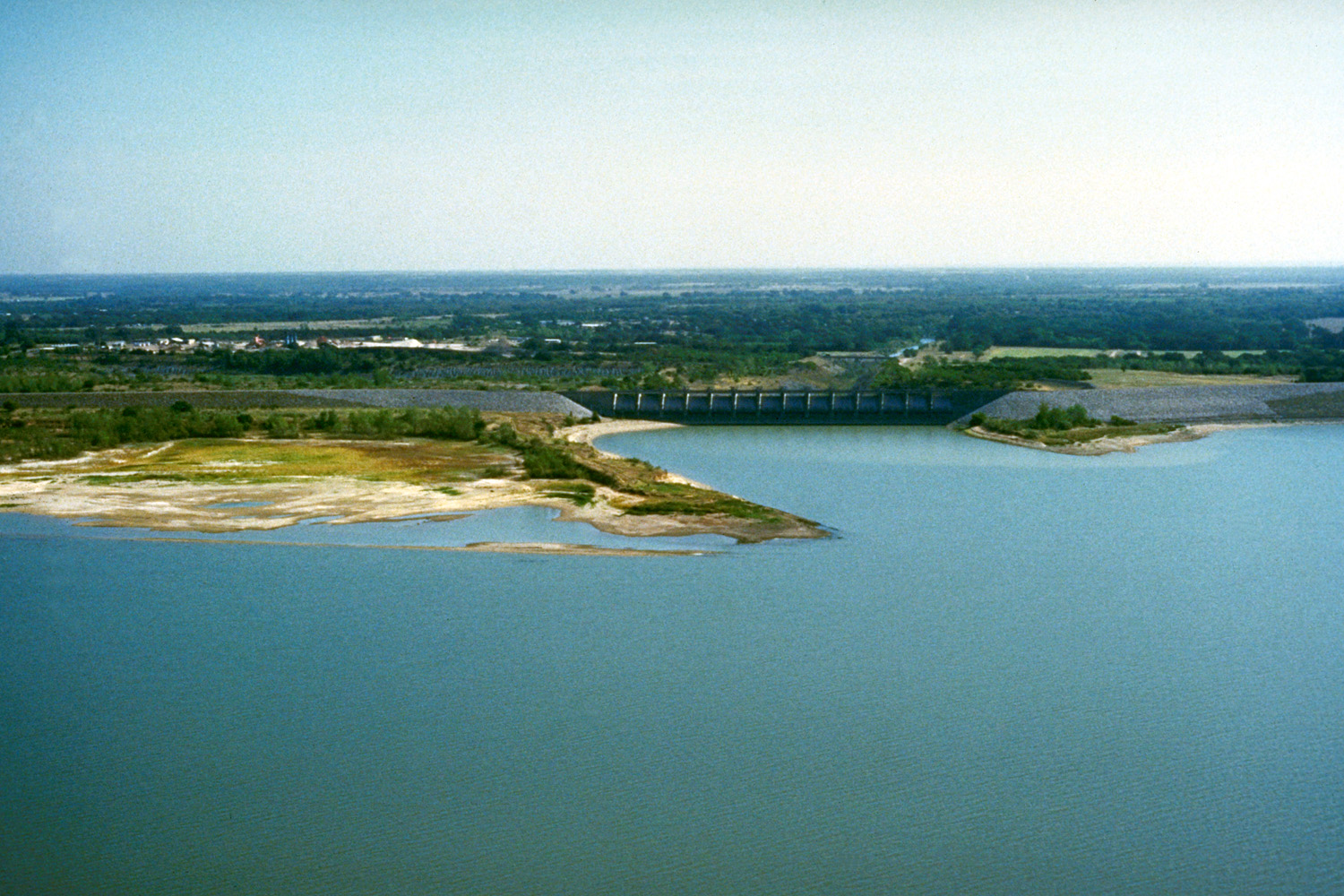
- Aerial view of Lake Waco and dam (circa 1960s).

- Location within Texas Location within the United States
- Location: Waco, Texas, United States
- Coordinates: 31°35′01″N 97°12′02″W
- Type: Reservoir
- Primary inflows: Bosque River
- Primary outflows: Bosque River
- Basin countries: United States
- Surface area: 8,190 acres (33.1 km^{2}) Max; 7,712 acres (31.21 km^{2}) Average
- Max. depth: 85 ft (26 m)
- Surface elevation: 462 ft (141 m)

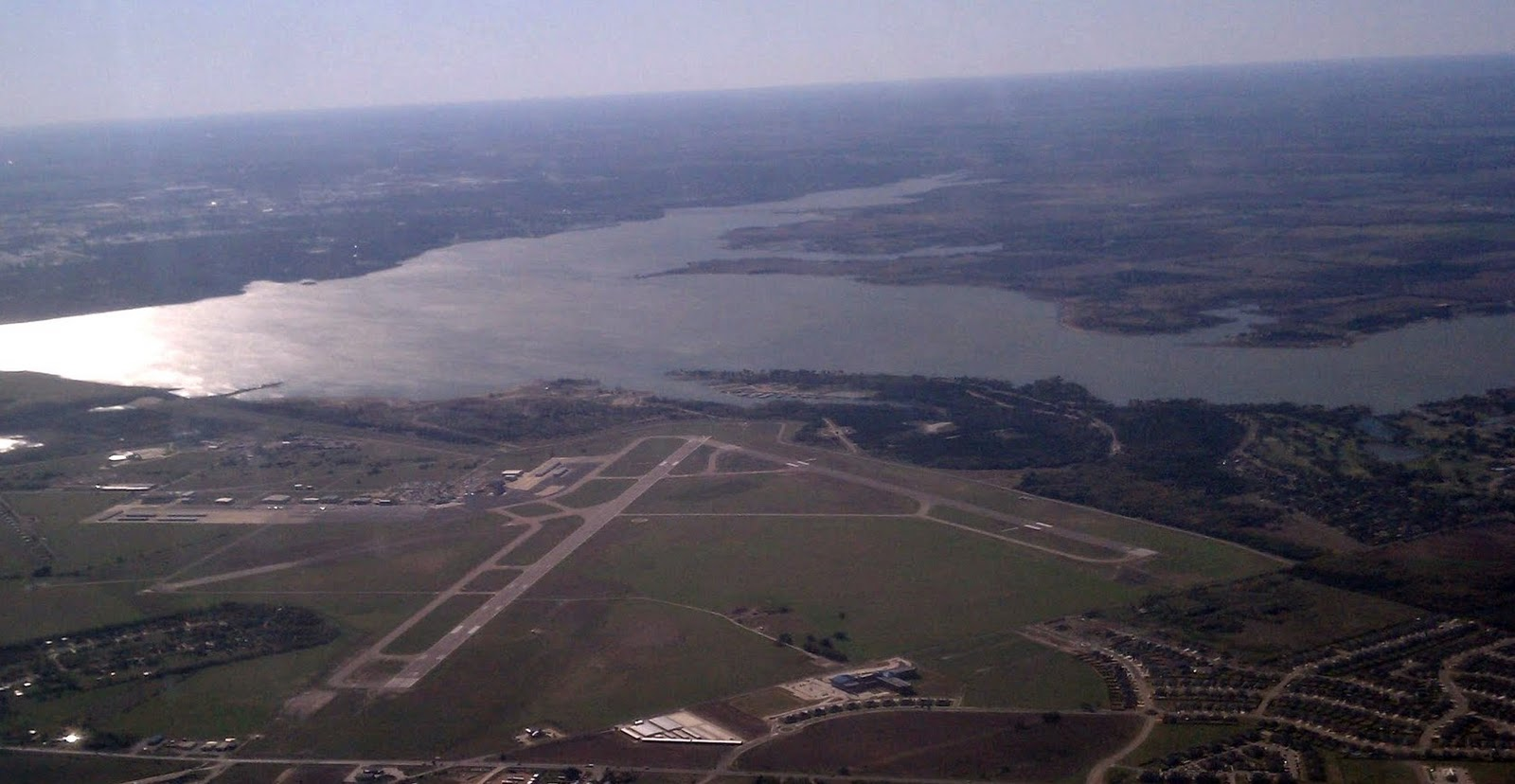
Aerial photo of Lake Waco looking south. Waco Regional Airport in foreground.

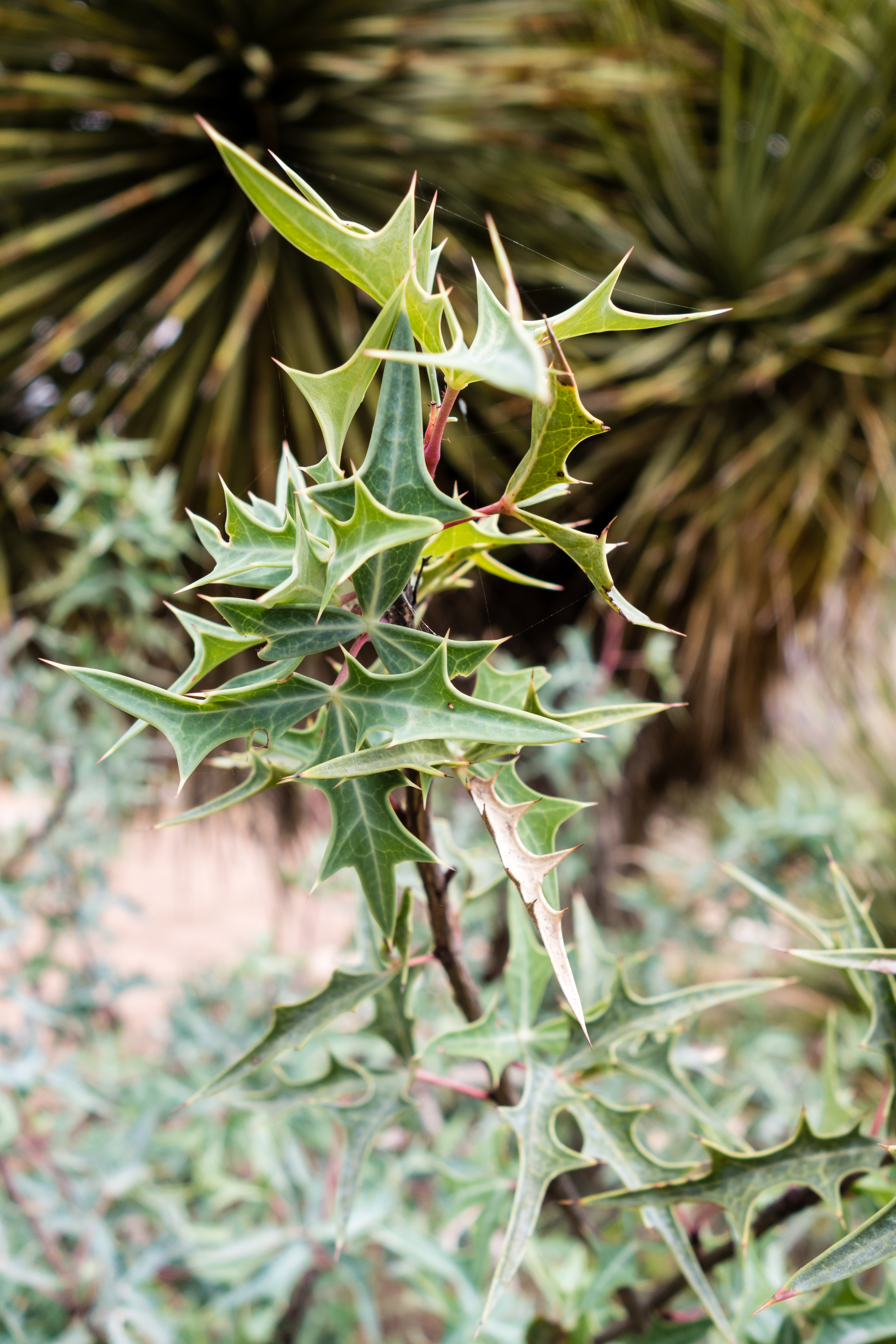
Agarita, a shrub found near Lake Waco

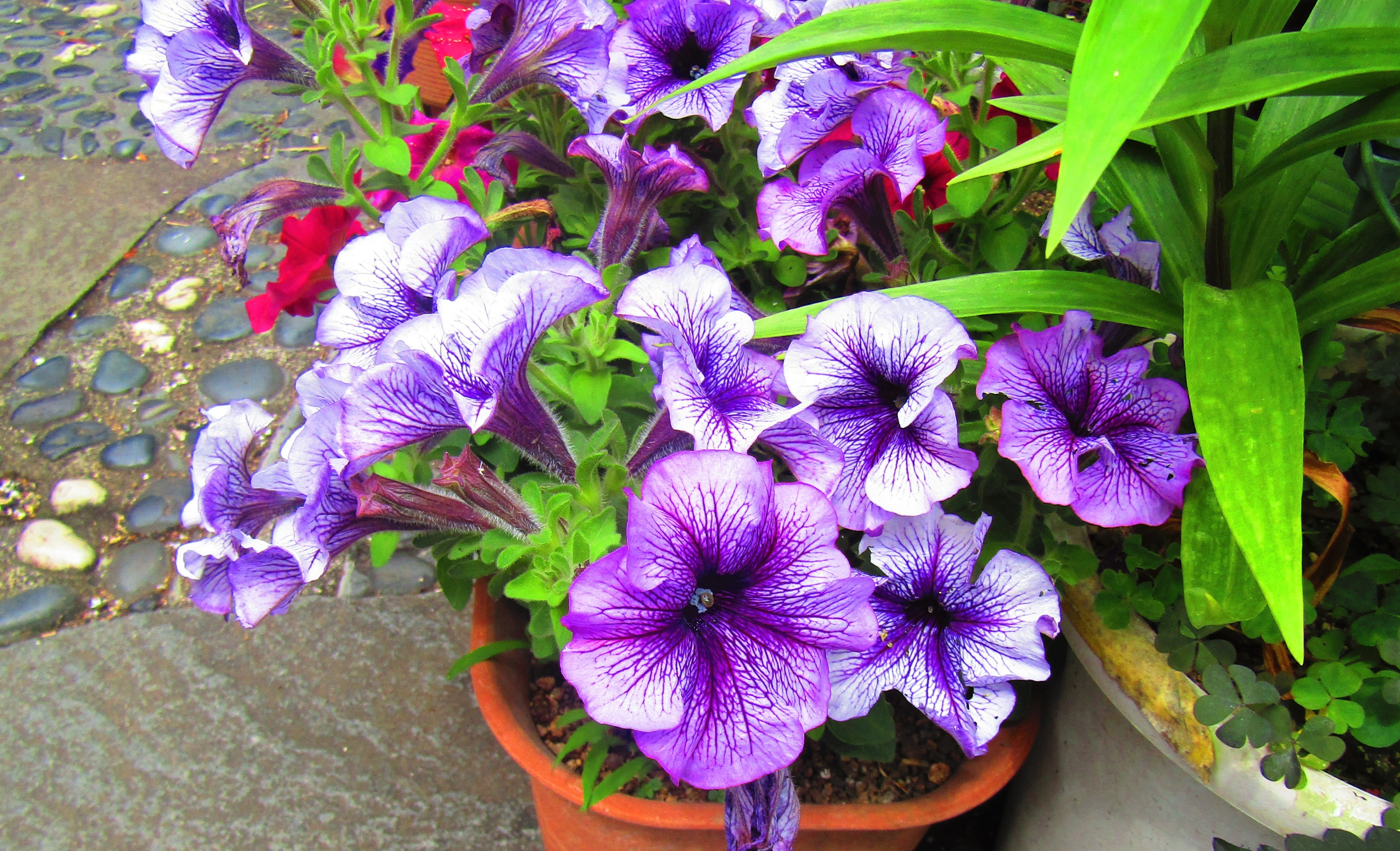
Wild Petunia

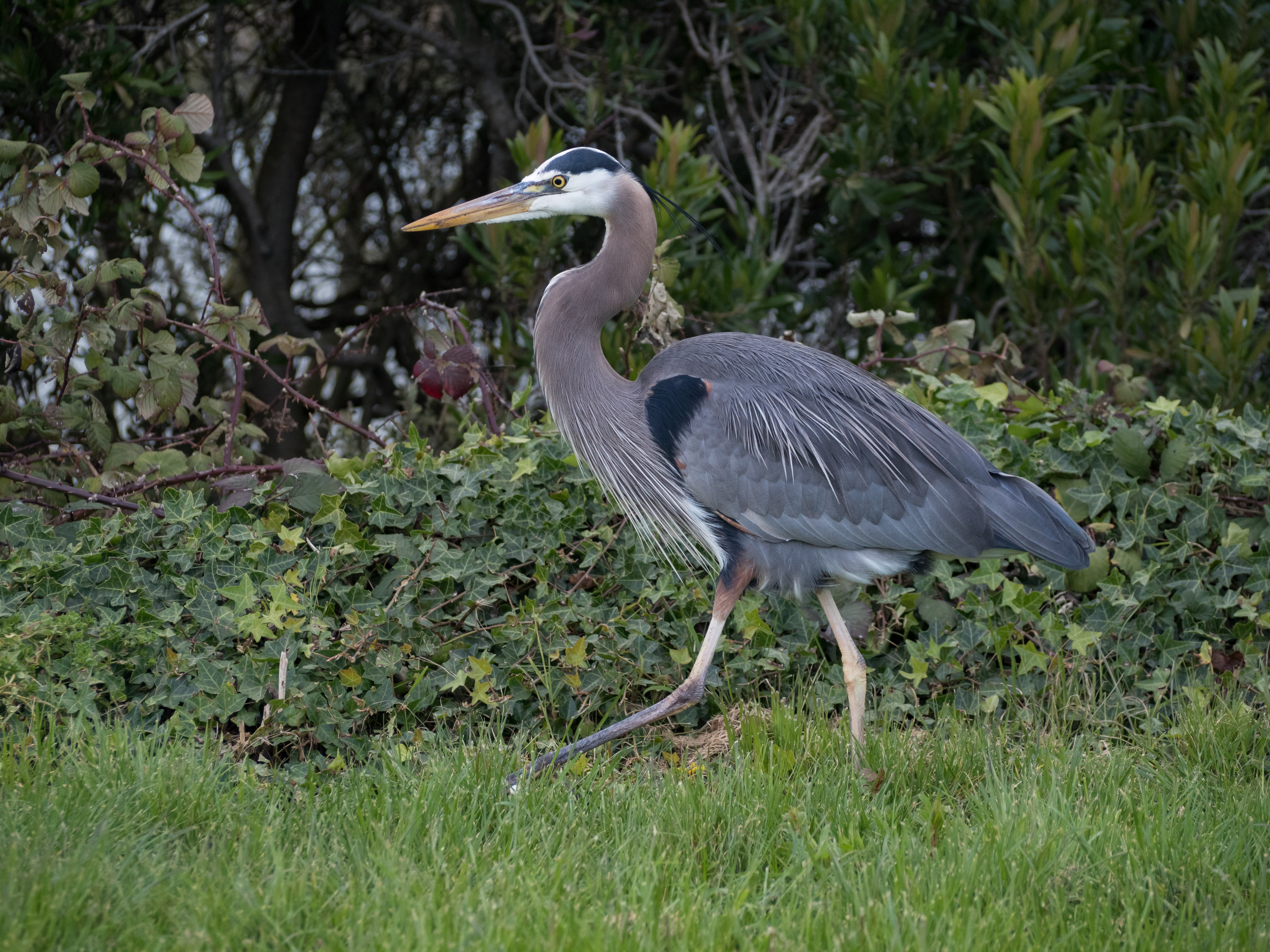
Great Blue Heron

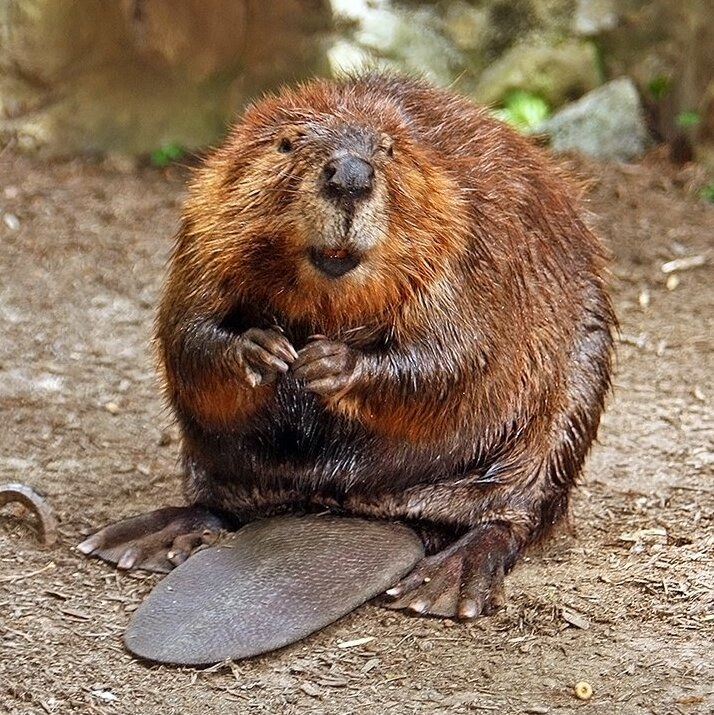
American Beaver

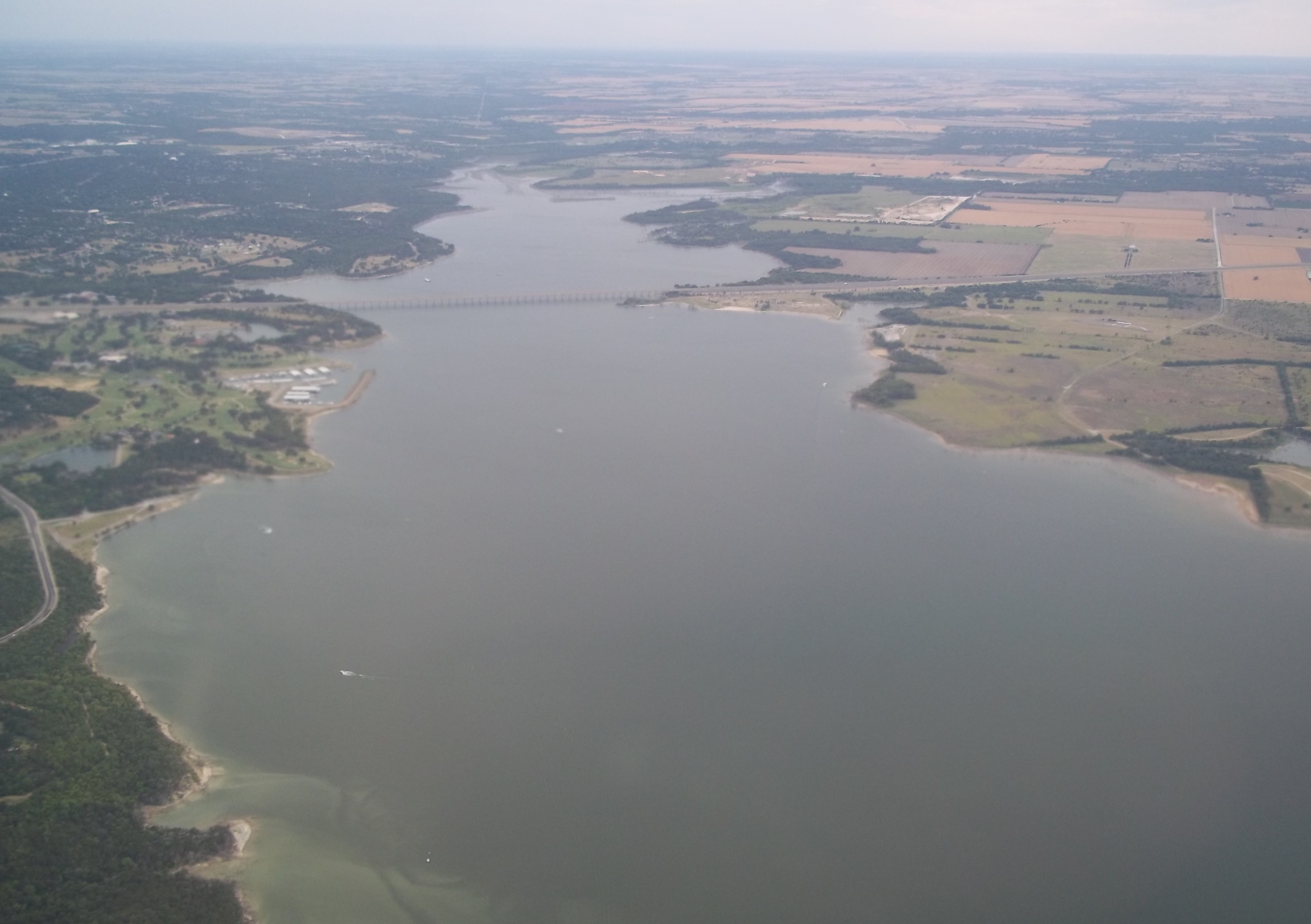
Southern half of Lake Waco with Twin Bridges (Texas State Highway 6) in view

Lake Waco is a man-made reservoir located on the west side of Waco, in McLennan County, Texas. It provides water to several cities in the Waco Metropolitan Statistical Area, including Waco (pop. 135,858), Bellmead (pop. 9,901), Hewitt (pop. 13,368), Robinson (pop. 10,509), Woodway (pop. 8,452) and others in the Cross Timbers and Prairies ecoregion of Texas. Lake Waco was formed by a dam built on the Bosque River basin. The lake has 79,000 acre-feet (97,000,000 m^{3}) of water and is managed by the U.S. Army Corps of Engineers.

== History ==
Originally built in 1930 by Callahan Construction Company, the Lake Waco Dam was used to control flooding of the Bosque river and to provide the city of Waco with a consistent water source. Due to increasing flood threats and population growth, the Flood Control Act of 1954 allowed for construction of a modern earthen dam to replace the original structure. The new dam, finished in 1965 by the U.S. Army Corps of Engineers, was 24,618 feet (7,504 m) in length with a height of 140 feet (43 m), increasing the surface area of the lake to 8,190 acres (3,310 ha). While the original dam cost only $2.5 million to construct, the new dam would reach a cost of $53.4 million. In 2003, the top of the conservation pool was raised by 7 feet (2.1 m) to bring the water level to 462 feet (141 m) above sea level.

== Hydrology ==
Lake Waco was formed from the merging of the North and South Bosque River, each being the major tributaries of the larger Brazos River. The spillway of the dam again outflows into the Bosque river, before joining with the Brazos. The average surface area of Lake Waco is 7,712 acres (31.21 km^{2}), surrounded by over 60 miles (97 km) of shoreline. The average depth is around 20 feet (6.1 m), however the max depth extends to 85 feet (26 m).

The average elevation of Lake Waco is held around 460 feet (140 m) above sea level, with a typical fluctuation of 2 to 6 feet (0.61 to 1.83 m). Prior to the construction of the new dam, droughts and floods were common occurrences for the city of Waco. However, the new dam has proven to be the proper solution, as there has not been any serious floods since its installation. However, a 2011 study from the Texas Water Development Board found that Lake Waco loses between 206 to 334 acre-feet (254,000 to 412,000 m^{3}) of capacity every year due to sediment deposition.

=== Physicochemical characteristics ===
The large amount of sediment and nutrient deposition results in eutrophic lake conditions, with algae and smartweed being the primary competitors for nutrients. The Bosque River as a whole is considered to have high nitrogen and phosphorus levels due to fertilizer runoff, and Lake Waco is no exception. The average total phosphorus load to Lake Waco is 147,093 kg/yr, while the total nitrogen load averages at 1,447,383 kg/yr. However, the nutrient concentrations in the lake suggest that just over half of this is deposited in an unusable form. The table below shows the average level of solute concentrations of each of the four streams that in-flow to Lake Waco, concentrations being in parts per million.

Average solute concentrations at the base of streams in the Lake Waco drainage basin
Stream	pH	Conductivity (μS)	Ca^{+2}	Na^{+}	Mg^{+2}	HCO_{3}	Cl^{−}	SO_{4}^{−2}	NO_{3}^{−}	F^{−}
South Bosque	7.7	525	77	29	4	201	25	56	27	0.29
Middle Bosque	7.8	371	65	14	2.5	179	16	29	9	0.30
Hog Creek	7.8	381	61	14	2	188	14	21	5.3	0.20
North Bosque	7.8	457	61	23	7	215	23	31	2	0.20

The amount of dissolved solids, combined with the suspension of clay from the in-flowing rivers, can cause high turbidity in Lake Waco, which can limit algal growth as the water becomes less transparent. In 2010, a large comprehensive study of Lake Waco was conducted to monitor chemical aspects of the water including nutrient levels, temperature, oxygen, pH, total organic carbon, and chlorophyll. The sediment core samples were found to consist mainly of silt and clay from the tributaries deposition.

== Ecology ==
=== Climate ===
Waco is home to a humid subtropical climate, consisting of hot, dry summers and mild winters with little snowfall. The annual rainfall for Waco is 37.51 inches (95.3 cm) per year, with some form of precipitation falling an average of 76.4 days out of the year. The average high temperature in July is 95.4 °F (35.2 °C), while the average low temperature in the month of January is 35.7 °F (2.1 °C).

=== Flora ===
Lake Waco hosts an extremely wide variety of plant life, and students of Baylor University have done a great job at classifying several of these organisms. Some trees and shrubs found on Lake Waco include Box elder maple, several variations of Sumac, Agarita, Roughleaf dogwood, Honeylocust, Pecan, Mesquite, along with several types of Oak, Elm, and Ash trees. Lake Waco is also home to several flowering plants such as Cocklebur, Giant goldenrod, and Papyrus. There are also several species of aquatic plants such as Cattails, Pickerelweed, and Water lilies. Wildflowers also cover the land surrounding Lake Waco, including Horsemint, the Common sunflower, Texas bull nettle, and the Wild petunia.

=== Fauna ===
Waco Lake is also home to a fascinating display of Texas wildlife in its local fauna. Common bird sightings include the Great blue heron, the Great egret, and Red-winged blackbirds located in the wetlands north of the lake. Several species of reptiles and amphibians can be found along the edges of streams and in the wetlands, including the Green treefrog, the American bullfrog, the Common snapping turtle, and several species of both venomous and non-venomous snakes. Other popular animal sightings around the lake include the American beaver and the White-tailed deer. Multiple species of invertebrates also call the areas around Lake Waco home, including the Asian clam, the Marsh ramshorn, the Prairie rabdotus, and the Decollate snail. Lake Waco also has several species of fish living beneath the water, including several species of bass, trout, catfish, crappie, carp, gar, and sunfish.

=== Invasive Species ===
In the fall of 2014, Zebra mussels were spotted in Lake Waco. The city of Waco worked with the US Army Corps of Engineers and the Texas Parks and Wildlife Department to devise a plan to quell the infestation. Before the spring spawning season, several tarps were laid upon the bottom of the lake to starve the mussels of oxygen. Surprisingly, this strategy seemed to work, as a 2016 inspection found no evidence of zebra mussel DNA in the lake. After a 5 year waiting period, the lake has now been declared Zebra mussel free.

== Lake use ==
The primary purpose of Lake Waco is to have a stable source of water and to prevent flooding in the region. The water rights to the lake are allocated to the city of Waco and the Brazos River Authority, although the lake is owned by the United States government. There are numerous industries in the area that rely on water from the lake, including Purvis Industries, Packless Industries, and American Industrial Lifting Products. The U.S. Army Corps of Engineers operates the dam, and although the primary purpose is water conservation and allocation, the lake has been popular for summer recreational activities since the 1930s. Several parks surround Lake Waco, also maintained by the corps. These include Airport Park, Flat Rock Park, Koehne Park, Lacy Point, Midway Park, Reynolds Creek Park, Speegleville Park, and Twin Bridges Park. These parks contain areas for camping, picnicking, hiking, fishing, and boating. One of the hiking trails, Lacy Point Nature Trail, is recognized through the National Trails System. Over the summer, educational programs are also offered over topics such as lake history and wildlife. The wetlands north of the lake are maintained by Baylor University and the city of Waco, and are used for research and education.

== Surrounding land use and effects ==
The use of land in the Lake Waco basin can have a significant impact upon the nutrient load received by the lake, depending upon the land use. 75% of the land area in the basin is forest and natural range land, contributing 30% of the phosphorus load to the lake and 21% of the nitrogen load. Cropland takes up a further 17% of the land area, but contributes 19% of phosphorus and a mighty 51% of nitrogen. This spike is likely due to runoff of fertilizer from the cropland adding significantly more nitrogen to the water. On the other hand, Concentrated Animal Feeding Operations (feedlots) account for less than 5% of land area in the lake basin, however, contribute 21% of the overall phosphorus load, which is greatly skewed when compared to the much larger area. If land use is not properly managed, nutrients could be added to the lake much faster, speeding the process of eutrophication at an alarming rate.
