= WHLR =

- Seelyville, Indiana; United States
- Broadcast area: Terre Haute, Indiana
- Frequency: 95.9 MHz

Programming
- Format: Christian adult contemporary
- Network: K-Love

Ownership
- Owner: Educational Media Foundation; (K-Love, Inc.)

History
- First air date: December 17, 1993
- Former call signs: WAGD (1993–1994); WTHC (1994–1999); WWSY (1999–2012); WXXR (2012–2014); WDKE (2014–2017); WVIG (2017–2022)

Technical information
- Licensing authority: FCC
- Facility ID: 66296
- Class: A
- Power: 4,100 watts
- HAAT: 121 meters (397 ft)
- Transmitter coordinates: 39°34′29″N 87°24′6″W

Links
- Public license information: Public file; LMS

WHLR (95.9 FM) is a radio station licensed to Seelyville, Indiana, United States, serving the Terre Haute area. The station broadcasts a Christian adult contemporary format as an affiliate of K-Love and is owned by the Educational Media Foundation through K-Love, Inc.

== History ==
The station went on the air as WAGD on December 17, 1993. On May 2, 1994, the station changed its call sign to WTHC, on December 1, 1999, to WWSY, and on June 12, 2012, to WXXR.

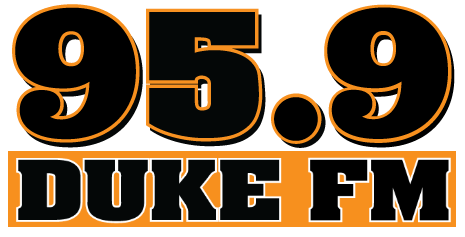
Logo as "95.9 Duke FM"

In May 2014, the website 959DukeFM.com was registered, and WXXR flipped to 1990s-based classic country as 95.9 Duke-FM shortly after Noon on May 23. A Facebook page was registered for the station, promoting that Duke-FM "Plays The Legends Of Country". On May 26, WXXR changed their call letters to WDKE, to go with the "Duke FM" branding.

On January 30, 2017, WDKE changed their call letters to WVIG and rebranded as "95.9 The Legend". This change coincided with the consummation of DLC Media's acquisition of WVIG from Midwest Communications.

On August 4, 2021, DLC Media filed a license assignment for a sale of WVIG to Educational Media Foundation, which planned to place its Air1 contemporary worship music format on the station.

On October 1, 2021, DLC took the station silent. On January 14, 2022, the station changed its call sign to WHLR. As of September 2023, it was on the air relaying K-Love.
