= WAKO-FM =

- Lawrenceville, Illinois; United States
- Frequency: 103.1 MHz
- Branding: Giant FM

Programming
- Format: Hot adult contemporary
- Affiliations: ABC News Radio

Ownership
- Owner: 3 Towers Broadcasting/Giant fm; (GIANT fm.)
- Sister stations: WAKO

History
- First air date: March 1965

Technical information
- Licensing authority: FCC
- Facility ID: 36787
- Class: A
- ERP: 6,000 watts
- HAAT: 100 meters (330 ft)
- Transmitter coordinates: 38°43′23.00″N 87°39′13.00″W

Links
- Public license information: Public file; LMS
- Webcast: Listen Live
- Website: giant.fm

WAKO-FM (103.1 MHz) is a radio station airing a hot adult contemporary format with 90's included. Licensed to Lawrenceville, Illinois, United States, the station is owned by Scott Huber, through licensee 3 Towers Broadcasting, and features programming from ABC News Radio.

The Giant FM morning show features Darby O'Flannery as Host of "The Morning Revolution with Darby & Friends" It's a mix of current stories, Bits, and Information provided by the professional morning prep service 'The Complete Sheet' a Wise Brother Media Service.

Giant FM Regional News is gathered and delivered by Johnnie McCormick

On May 3, 2024, WAKO-FM rebranded as "Giant FM".

== Notable former on-air staff ==
- David Goodnow, 1959–1961

== logo ==
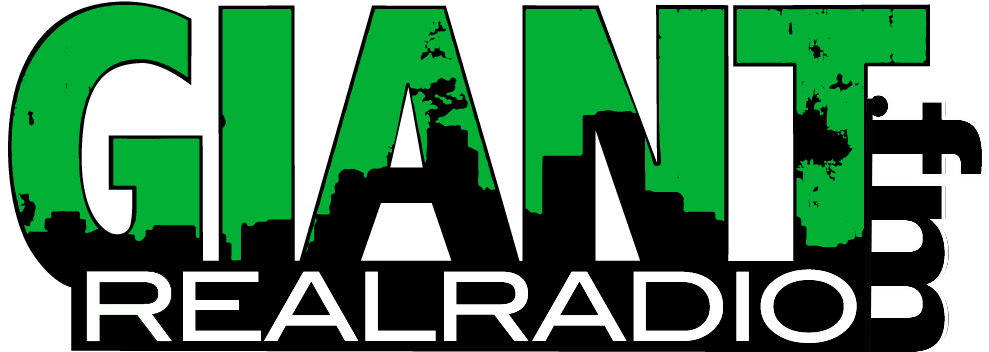
