= WFNB (AM) =

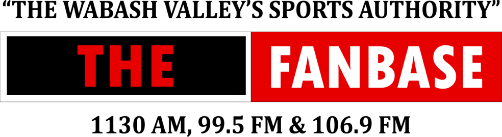
- Brazil, Indiana; United States
- Broadcast area: Terre Haute, Indiana
- Frequency: 1130 kHz
- Branding: The Fanbase

Programming
- Format: Sports radio
- Affiliations: Fox Sports Radio

Ownership
- Owner: Joey and Kelsey O’Rourke; (JKO Media Group)
- Sister stations: WFNF

History
- First air date: May 17, 1960 (first license granted)
- Former call signs: WITE (1960–1962); WBZI (1962–1964); WWCM (1964–1981); WNSA (1981–1982); WWCM (1982–1985); WSDM (1985–1987); WBZL (1987–1992); WSDM (1992–2000); WSDX (2000–2012); WFNF (2012–2017); WAMB (2017–2024)
- Call sign meaning: "Fanbase"

Technical information
- Licensing authority: FCC
- Facility ID: 19669
- Class: D
- Power: 500 watts day; 20 watts night
- Transmitter coordinates: 39°30′44.00″N 87°8′18.00″W
- Translators: 99.5 W258BA (Terre Haute); 106.9 W295CQ (Brazil)

Links
- Public license information: Public file; LMS
- Webcast: player.amperwave.net/13983
- Website: www.wfnbthefanbase.com

WFNB (1130 AM) is a radio station broadcasting a sports radio format. Licensed to Brazil, Indiana, United States, the station serves the Terre Haute area. It first began broadcasting in 1960 under the call sign WITE. The station is owned by Joey and Kelsey O’Rourke, through licensee JKO Media Group.

== History ==
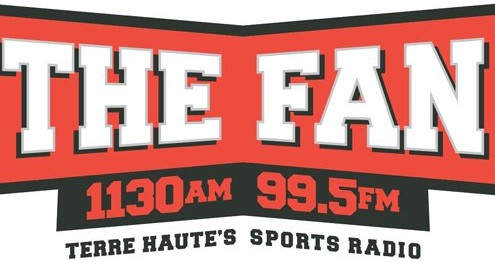
Logo as WFNF "The Fan"

The station was first licensed as WITE on May 17, 1960. It changed its call sign to WBZI on September 5, 1962; to WWCM on November 9, 1964; and to WNSA on July 13, 1981. The WWCM call sign returned on July 14, 1982; on June 6, 1985, the station changed its call sign to WSDM; again on October 15, 1987, to WBZL; on February 15, 1992, back to WSDM; on January 31, 2000, to WSDX; on September 24, 2012, to WFNF; and on August 22, 2017, to WAMB.

On September 1, 2017, WAMB changed formats from sports to adult standards, branded as "Timeless Classics 1130 AM 99.5 FM". On September 15, 2021, WAMB changed its format from adult standards to soft adult contemporary, branded as "The Breeze". In 2024, after being sold by David Crooks' DLC Media to Joey and Kelsey O’Rourke's JKO Media for $875,000, the station returned to sports as WFNB, "The Fanbase".

== Translator ==
Broadcast translators for WFNB
Call sign	Frequency	City of license	FID	ERP (W)	HAAT	Class	Transmitter coordinates	FCC info
W258BA	99.5 FM	Terre Haute, Indiana	152754	250	119.8 m (393 ft)	D	39°27′13″N 87°28′15″W	LMS
W295CQ	106.9 FM	Brazil, Indiana	200297	250	0 m (0 ft)	D	39°30′44.1″N 87°8′18.1″W	LMS
