= 1983–84 NFL playoffs =

American football tournament

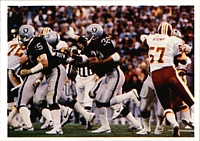
- The Los Angeles Raiders playing the Washington Redskins in Super Bowl XVIII
- Dates: December 24, 1983–January 22, 1984
- Season: 1983
- Teams: 10
- Games played: 9
- Super Bowl XVIII site: Tampa Stadium; Tampa, Florida
- Defending champions: Washington Redskins
- Champion: Los Angeles Raiders (3rd title)
- Runner-up: Washington Redskins
- Conference runners-up: San Francisco 49ers; Seattle Seahawks
NFL playoffs
← 1982–83	1984–85 →

The National Football League playoffs for the 1983 season began on December 24, 1983. The postseason tournament concluded with the Los Angeles Raiders defeating the Washington Redskins in Super Bowl XVIII, 38–9, on January 22, 1984, at Tampa Stadium in Tampa, Florida.

This marked the first season since 1968 that legendary referee Jim Tunney did not receive an on-field playoff assignment. He was the alternate referee for the Super Bowl.

== Participants ==
Within each conference, the three division winners and the two non-division winners with the best overall regular season records qualified for the playoffs. The NFL did not use a fixed-bracket playoff system. The three division winners were seeded 1–3 based on their overall won-lost-tied record, and received a first-round bye while the wild card teams were seeded 4 and 5, and played in the first round, dubbed the wild-card playoffs or wild-card weekend, with the 4 seed hosting. The second round, the divisional playoffs, had a restriction where two teams from the same division could not meet: the surviving wild card team visited the division champion outside its division that had the higher seed, and the remaining two teams from that conference played each other. The two surviving teams from each conference's divisional playoff games then met in the respective AFC and NFC Conference Championship games, hosted by the higher seed. Finally the Super Bowl, the championship round of the playoffs, was played at a neutral site, with the designated home team based on an annual rotation by conference.

Playoff seeds
Seed	AFC	NFC
1	Los Angeles Raiders (West winner)	Washington Redskins (East winner)
2	Miami Dolphins (East winner)	San Francisco 49ers (West winner)
3	Pittsburgh Steelers (Central winner)	Detroit Lions (Central winner)
4	Seattle Seahawks (wild card)	Dallas Cowboys (wild card)
5	Denver Broncos (wild card)	Los Angeles Rams (wild card)

== Bracket ==
Note: The Los Angeles Raiders (the AFC 1 seed) did not play the Seattle Seahawks (the 4 seed) in the Divisional playoff round because both teams were in the same division.

Dec 31 – Candlestick Park
3	Detroit	23
Dec 26 – Texas Stadium	Jan 8 – RFK Stadium
2	San Francisco	24
NFC
5	LA Rams	24	2	San Francisco	21
Jan 1 – RFK Stadium
4	Dallas	17	1	Washington	24
NFC Championship
5	LA Rams	7
Jan 22 – Tampa Stadium
1	Washington	51
Divisional playoffs
Wild Card playoffs	N1	Washington	9
Dec 31 – Miami Orange Bowl
A1	LA Raiders	38
Super Bowl XVIII
4	Seattle	27
Dec 24 – Kingdome	Jan 8 – Los Angeles Memorial Coliseum
2*	Miami	20
AFC
5	Denver	7	4	Seattle	14
Jan 1 – Los Angeles Memorial Coliseum
4	Seattle	31	1	LA Raiders	30
AFC Championship
3	Pittsburgh	10
1*	LA Raiders	38

== Schedule ==
Due to Christmas falling on a Sunday, the two wild card playoff games were played in a span of three days, with one on Saturday, December 24, and the other on Monday, December 26.

In the United States, NBC broadcast the AFC playoff games, while CBS televised the NFC games and Super Bowl XVIII.

Round	Away team	Score	Home team	Date	Kickoff (ET / UTC−5)	TV
Wild-card round	Denver Broncos	7–31	Seattle Seahawks	December 24, 1983	4:00 p.m.	NBC
Wild-card round	Los Angeles Rams	24–17	Dallas Cowboys	December 26, 1983	2:30 p.m.	CBS
Divisional round	Seattle Seahawks	27–20	Miami Dolphins	December 31, 1983	12:30 p.m.	NBC
Divisional round	Detroit Lions	23–24	San Francisco 49ers	December 31, 1983	4:00 p.m.	CBS
Divisional round	Los Angeles Rams	7–51	Washington Redskins	January 1, 1984	12:30 p.m.	CBS
Divisional round	Pittsburgh Steelers	10–38	Los Angeles Raiders	January 1, 1984	4:00 p.m.	NBC
Conference championships	San Francisco 49ers	21–24	Washington Redskins	January 8, 1984	12:30 p.m.	CBS
Conference championships	Seattle Seahawks	14–30	Los Angeles Raiders	January 8, 1984	4:00 p.m.	NBC
Super Bowl XVIII Tampa Stadium Tampa, Florida	Washington Redskins	9–38	Los Angeles Raiders	January 22, 1984	4:30 p.m.	CBS

== Wild-card round ==
=== Saturday, December 24, 1983 ===
==== AFC: Seattle Seahawks 31, Denver Broncos 7 ====
Denver Broncos vs. Seattle Seahawks – Game summary

Quarter	1	2	3	4	Total
Broncos	7	0	0	0	7
Seahawks	7	3	7	14	31

at Kingdome, Seattle, Washington

- Game time: 4:00 p.m. EST/1:00 p.m. PST
- Game attendance: 64,275
- Referee: Red Cashion
- TV announcers (NBC): Charlie Jones (play-by-play) and Bob Griese (color commentator)

Game information

First quarter

- SEA – Steve Largent 17-yard pass from Dave Krieg (Norm Johnson kick). Seahawks 7–0.
- DEN – Jesse Myles 13-yard pass from Steve DeBerg (Rich Karlis kick). Tied 7–7.

Second quarter

- SEA – Norm Johnson 37-yard field goal. Seahawks 10–7.

Third quarter

- SEA – Pete Metzelaars 5-yard pass from Dave Krieg (Norm Johnson kick). Seahawks 17–7.

Fourth quarter

- SEA – Paul Johns 18-yard pass from Dave Krieg (Norm Johnson kick). Seahawks 24–7.
- SEA – David Hughes 2-yard run (Norm Johnson kick). Seahawks 31–7.

Top passers

- DEN – Steve DeBerg – 14/19, 131 yards, TD, INT
- SEA – Dave Krieg – 12/13, 200 yards, 3 TD

Top rushers

- DEN – Sammy Winder – 16 rushes, 59 yards
- SEA – Curt Warner – 23 rushes, 99 yards

Top receivers

- DEN – Jesse Myles – 7 receptions, 73 yards
- SEA – Steve Largent – 4 receptions, 76 yards, TD

Both teams came into the game with remarkably similar seasons. Each had a 9–7 record, and both had gone through multiple starting quarterbacks. The Seahawks were starting Dave Krieg, who had replaced Jim Zorn in the ninth game of the season. Steve DeBerg started for the Broncos, returning to the lineup for the first time in seven weeks after suffering a separated shoulder.

The Seahawks won their first playoff game in team history with Krieg completing 12 of 13 passes for 200 yards and three touchdowns. They also got a big performance out of rookie running back Curt Warner, who rushed for 99 yards and caught three passes for 22 yards.

Seattle scored on the opening drive of the game, with Warner carrying the ball on six of eight plays and Krieg hitting wide receiver Steve Largent for a 17-yard touchdown pass. After a few punts, the Broncos tied the game with Jesse Myles' 13-yard touchdown reception from DeBerg. After forcing Seattle to punt, DeBerg drove the Broncos to the Seahawks 29-yard line. However, Kerry Justin intercepted DeBerg's underthrown pass and returned the ball 45 yards to set up Norm Johnson's 37-yard field goal, giving the team a 10–7 lead. The Broncos responded with a drive to the Seattle 5-yard line, but once again they failed to score as running back Gerald Willhite lost the ball while being tackled by linebacker Shelton Robinson and safety Paul Moyer recovered it with less than two minutes left in the half.

On Seattle's first drive of the second half, Krieg completed a 28-yard pass to tight end Charle Young and a 34-yarder to Largent on the next play. Following two carries by Warner for six yards, Krieg finished the possession with a 5-yard touchdown pass to tight end Pete Metzelaars, making the score 17–7. The Seahawks went on to score two more touchdowns, an 18-yard pass from Krieg to Paul Johns on the first play of the fourth quarter, and a 2-yard run by the reserve fullback David Hughes with 9:34 remaining in the game. Meanwhile, Broncos rookie quarterback John Elway made his playoff debut, replacing DeBerg in the fourth quarter. He completed 10 of 15 passes for 123 yards and rushed for 16, but also threw an interception to Seahawks defensive back Gregg Johnson.

This was the first postseason meeting between the Broncos and Seahawks, and would not meet again in the playoffs until Super Bowl XLVIII.

=== Monday, December 26, 1983 ===
==== NFC: Los Angeles Rams 24, Dallas Cowboys 17 ====
Los Angeles Rams vs. Dallas Cowboys – Game summary

Quarter	1	2	3	4	Total
Rams	7	0	7	10	24
Cowboys	0	7	3	7	17

at Texas Stadium, Irving, Texas

- Game time: 2:30 p.m. EST/1:30 p.m. CST
- Game weather: 27 °F (−3 °C), mostly cloudy
- Game attendance: 62,118
- Referee: Gordon McCarter
- TV announcers (CBS): Pat Summerall (play-by-play) and John Madden (color commentator)

Game information

First quarter

- LA – Drew Hill 18-yard pass from Vince Ferragamo (Mike Lansford kick). Rams 7–0.

Second quarter

- DAL – Tony Hill 14-yard pass from Danny White (Rafael Septién kick). Tied 7–7.

Third quarter

- DAL – Rafael Septién 41-yard field goal. Cowboys 10–7.
- LA – Preston Dennard 16-yard pass from Vince Ferragamo (Mike Lansford kick). Rams 14–10.

Fourth quarter

- LA – George Farmer 8-yard pass from Vince Ferragamo (Mike Lansford kick). Rams 21–10.
- LA – Mike Lansford 20-yard field goal. Rams 24–10.
- DAL – Doug Cosbie 2-yard pass from Danny White (Rafael Septién kick). Rams 24–17.

Top passers

- LA – Vince Ferragamo – 15/30, 162 yards, 3 TD
- DAL – Danny White – 32/53, 330 yards, 2 TD, 3 INT

Top rushers

- LA – Eric Dickerson – 23 rushes, 99 yards
- DAL – Tony Dorsett – 17 rushes, 59 yards

Top receivers

- LA – George Farmer – 5 receptions, 47 yards, TD
- DAL – Tony Hill – 9 receptions, 115 yards, TD

The Rams converted three turnovers in the second half into 17 points to upset the heavily favored Cowboys in Dallas. Los Angeles opened the scoring in the first quarter on quarterback Vince Ferragamo's 18-yard touchdown pass to Drew Hill after an 85-yard drive. The Cowboys then tied the game with 23 seconds left in the half after quarterback Danny White capped a 70-yard drive with a 14-yard touchdown pass to wide receiver Tony Hill.

Dallas took the lead in the third quarter with Rafael Septién's 41-yard field goal. But then the Rams took advantage of the Cowboys' turnovers. Los Angeles' Mike Wilcher recovered a muffed punt from Gary Allen at the Dallas 16-yard line, setting up wide receiver Preston Dennard's 16-yard touchdown reception. Then linebacker Jim Collins' interception set up Ferragamo's 8-yard pass to wide receiver George Farmer. Finally, LeRoy Irvin's 94-yard interception return to the Dallas 3-yard line set up Mike Lansford's 20-yard field goal. White was intercepted for the third time on Dallas' next drive, this time by linebacker Mel Owens. By the time White threw a 2-yard touchdown pass to tight end Doug Cosbie, only 1:03 remained on the game clock.

Rams rookie running back Eric Dickerson rushed for 99 yards and caught two passes for 11 yards. Tony Hill set a franchise playoff record with nine receptions for 115 yards. Ferragamo completed 15 of 30 passes for 162 yards and three touchdowns. White completed 32 of 53 passes for 330 yards and two touchdowns, with three costly interceptions.

This was the seventh postseason meeting between the Rams and Cowboys. Dallas had won four of the previous six meetings.

Previous playoff games
Dallas leads 4–2 in all-time playoff games

1973

Los Angeles Rams 16 @ Dallas Cowboys 27

1973 NFC Divisional playoffs

1975

Dallas Cowboys 37 @ Los Angeles Rams 7

1975 NFC Championship Game

1976

Los Angeles Rams 14 @ Dallas Cowboys 12

1976 NFC Divisional playoffs

1978

Dallas Cowboys 28 @ Los Angeles Rams 0

1978 NFC Championship Game

1979

Los Angeles Rams 21 @ Dallas Cowboys 19

1979 NFC Divisional playoffs

1980

Los Angeles Rams 13 @ Dallas Cowboys 34

1980 NFC Wild Card playoffs

== Divisional round ==
=== Saturday, December 31, 1983 ===
==== AFC: Seattle Seahawks 27, Miami Dolphins 20 ====
Seattle Seahawks vs. Miami Dolphins – Game summary

Quarter	1	2	3	4	Total
Seahawks	0	7	7	13	27
Dolphins	0	13	0	7	20

at Orange Bowl, Miami, Florida

- Game time: 12:30 p.m. EST
- Game weather: 51 °F (11 °C), light rain
- Game attendance: 74,136
- Referee: Fred Wyant
- TV announcers (NBC): Marv Albert (play-by-play) and Bob Trumpy (color commentator)

Game information

First quarter

- MIA – Dan Johnson 19-yard pass from Dan Marino (kick failed). Dolphins 6–0.

Second quarter

- SEA – Cullen Bryant 6-yard pass from Dave Krieg (Norm Johnson kick). Seahawks 7–6.
- MIA – Mark Duper 32-yard pass from Dan Marino (Uwe von Schamann kick). Dolphins 13–7.

Third quarter

- SEA – Curt Warner 1-yard run (Norm Johnson kick). Seahawks 14–13.
- SEA – Norm Johnson 27-yard field goal. Seahawks 17–13.
- MIA – Woody Bennett 3-yard run (Uwe von Schamann kick). Dolphins 20–17.

Fourth quarter

- SEA – Curt Warner 2-yard run (Norm Johnson kick). Seahawks 24–20.
- SEA – Norm Johnson 37-yard field goal. Seahawks 27–20.

Top passers

- SEA – Dave Krieg – 15/28, 192 yards, TD, INT
- MIA – Dan Marino – 15/25, 193 yards, 2 TD, 2 INT

Top rushers

- SEA – Curt Warner – 29 rushes, 113 yards, 2 TD
- MIA – David Overstreet – 9 rushes, 50 yards

Top receivers

- SEA – Paul Johns – 4 receptions, 60 yards
- MIA – Mark Duper – 9 receptions, 117 yards, TD

Despite their dominant win in the wild card round, the 9–7 Seahawks hardly seemed a significant obstacle for the defending AFC champion Dolphins (12–4). However, the Seahawks converted three turnovers in the second half into thirteen points, while running back Curt Warner rushed for 113 yards, caught five passes for 38 yards, and scored two touchdowns. By the end of the game, Miami turned the football over five times, including consecutive fumbled kickoffs in the closing minutes.

After a scoreless first quarter in the Orange Bowl, the Dolphins scored first on rookie quarterback Dan Marino's 19-yard pass to tight end Dan Johnson, but Uwe von Schamann's extra point attempt was blocked. Seattle running back Zachary Dixon returned the ensuing kickoff 59 yards to set up Dave Krieg's 6-yard touchdown pass to fullback Cullen Bryant and the Seahawks led 7–6. Near the end of the first half, Miami retook the lead with Marino's 32-yard touchdown pass to Mark Duper.

In the third quarter, Seattle defensive back John Harris recovered a fumble that led to Warner's 1-yard touchdown run and Seattle led 14–13. In the fourth quarter, Seahawks cornerback Kerry Justin's interception of a Marino pass was converted into a 27-yard field goal by Norm Johnson, increasing the lead to four at 17–13.

With time running out, Seattle made their only blunder of the day when Krieg threw an interception to Miami defensive back Gerald Small, who returned the ball 18 yards to set up Woody Bennett's 3-yard touchdown run, giving Miami a 20–17 lead with 3:43 remaining. Seattle receiver Steve Largent, who had no receptions up to this point, caught a pair of passes from Krieg for gains of 16 and 40 yards as they drove to retake the lead 24–20 on Warner's 2-yard touchdown run with under two minutes left. On the ensuing kickoff, Miami returner Fulton Walker fumbled and rookie reserve linebacker Sam Merriman recovered, setting up Johnson's 37-yard field goal to extend the lead to seven at 27–20. Amazingly, Walker fumbled on the next kickoff as well; Seattle running back Dan Doornink recovered and the offense ran out the clock.

This was Seattle's only road victory in the postseason until 2012, when they won in Washington 24–14. Harris finished the game with an interception, a fumble recovery, and four tackles. Other key defensive players for Seattle included Dave Brown, who had 10 tackles, and Keith Butler, who had nine. Duper caught nine passes for 117 yards and a touchdown.

This was the first postseason meeting between the Seahawks and Dolphins.

==== NFC: San Francisco 49ers 24, Detroit Lions 23 ====
Detroit Lions vs. San Francisco 49ers – Game summary

Quarter	1	2	3	4	Total
Lions	3	6	0	14	23
49ers	7	7	3	7	24

at Candlestick Park, San Francisco, California

- Game time: 4:00 p.m. EST/1:00 p.m. PST
- Game weather: 59 °F (15 °C), sunny
- Game attendance: 59,979
- Referee: Pat Haggerty
- TV announcers (CBS): Frank Glieber (play-by-play) and Dick Vermeil (color commentator)

Game information

First quarter

- DET – Eddie Murray 37-yard field goal. Lions 3–0.
- SF – Roger Craig 1-yard run (Ray Wersching kick). 49ers 7–3.

Second quarter

- SF – Wendell Tyler 2-yard run (Ray Wersching kick). 49ers 14–3.
- DET – Eddie Murray 21-yard field goal. 49ers 14–6.
- DET – Eddie Murray 54-yard field goal. 49ers 14–9.

Third quarter

- SF – Ray Wersching 19-yard field goal. 49ers 17–9.

Fourth quarter

- DET – Billy Sims 11-yard run (Eddie Murray kick). 49ers 17–16.
- DET – Billy Sims 3-yard run (Eddie Murray kick). Lions 23–17.
- SF – Freddie Solomon 14-yard pass from Joe Montana (Ray Wersching kick). 49ers 24–23.

Top passers

- DET – Gary Danielson – 24/38, 236 yards, 5 INT
- SF – Joe Montana – 18/31, 201 yards, TD, INT

Top rushers

- DET – Billy Sims – 20 rushes, 114 yards, 2 TD
- SF – Wendell Tyler – 17 rushes, 74 yards, TD

Top receivers

- DET – Leonard Thompson – 6 receptions, 74 yards
- SF – Russ Francis – 4 receptions, 75 yards

Lions kicker Eddie Murray made three field goals, including a postseason record 54-yard kick, but missed two attempts in the fourth quarter, the second a potential game-winning 43-yard kick with five seconds left.

Both teams came into this game missing key starters. The 49ers were without injured starting receiver Dwight Clark, while the Lions had to start quarterback Gary Danielson in place of injured starter Eric Hipple. Detroit scored first on Murray's 37-yard field goal less than five minutes into the game. They were poised to score again on their next drive, but Ronnie Lott intercepted a pass from Danielson on the San Francisco 15-yard line. The 49ers offense then drove 85 yards in 10 plays and took a 7–3 lead on a 1-yard touchdown run from Roger Craig. On the first play of Detroit's next drive, rookie linebacker Riki Ellison intercepted Danielson and returned the ball four yards to the Lions 24-yard line. Four plays later, Wendell Tyler's 2-yard touchdown run increased their lead to 14–3 early in the second quarter.

Things kept getting worse for Detroit as Danielson threw two more interceptions on each of their next two possessions, first to safety Dwight Hicks and then to linebacker Keena Turner. However, their defense managed to prevent the 49ers from converting either one of them into points. On their next drive, running back Billy Sims took off for a 56-yard carry to the San Francisco 1-yard line before being tackled by Eric Wright. Despite a first and goal on the 1, Detroit could not get into the end zone and settled for Murray's second field goal, cutting the score to 14–6. Following a 49ers punt, Detroit moved the ball to San Francisco's 37-yard line in the closing seconds of the half, where Murray made a playoff record 54-yard field goal that made the score 14–9 going into halftime.

In the third quarter, Danielson threw his fifth interception of the day and his second to Ellison, who returned it four yards to the Lions 45. Joe Montana's 27-yard completion to tight end Russ Francis and Tyler's 11-yard run gave the team a first and goal from the 7, but the Lions made a key goal line stand to force Ray Wersching's 19-yard field goal, putting San Francisco up 17–9. Danielson then rallied the Lions back with six completions on a 10-play, 73-yard drive that ended with Sims' 11-yard touchdown run, cutting the deficit to 17–16 with 13:36 left in the fourth quarter.

Their defense subsequently gave them a great chance to take the lead when they recovered a fumble from Craig on the 49ers 37-yard line. But penalties stalled the drive and Murray missed a 43-yard field goal attempt. Still, the Lions defense came up with another huge opportunity as Bobby Watkins intercepted a pass from Montana and returned it 24 yards to the San Francisco 27. This time the Lions offense managed to convert the turnover with a 2-yard touchdown run by Sims, giving them their first lead of the game, 23–17 with 4:44 remaining.

Up to this point, Montana had been rather ineffective, completing just 12 of 25 passes for 151 yards with an interception and no touchdowns. But with the game on the line, Montana rallied his team with a scoring drive to put them back into the lead. Starting from their own 30-yard line, the 49ers advanced to the Lions 27 by the two-minute warning, with Montana completing four passes for 24 yards. Montana hooked up with Francis for a 13-yard gain on the next play, and then threw a 14-yard touchdown pass to Freddie Solomon, giving the 49ers a 24–23 lead with 1:23 left. Detroit then drove 49 yards to set up a game-winning 43-yard field goal attempt for Murray in the closing seconds, but his kick was wide right by a narrow margin, enabling San Francisco to win the game.

Montana finished the game completing 18 of 31 passes for 201 yards and a touchdown, with one interception, while also rushing for 16 yards. Danielson finished his only career playoff game completing 24 of 38 passes for 236 yards, but was intercepted five times. Sims was the top rusher of the game with 20 carries for 116 yards and two touchdowns. He also caught four passes for 26 yards.

This was the second postseason meeting between the Lions and 49ers. Detroit won the previous meeting.

Previous playoff games
Detroit leads 1–0 in all-time playoff games

1957

Detroit Lions 31 @ San Francisco 49ers 27

1957 NFL Western Conf. playoff

=== Sunday, January 1, 1984 ===
==== NFC: Washington Redskins 51, Los Angeles Rams 7 ====
Los Angeles Rams vs. Washington Redskins – Game summary

Quarter	1	2	3	4	Total
Rams	0	7	0	0	7
Redskins	17	21	6	7	51

at Robert F. Kennedy Memorial Stadium, Washington, D.C.

- Game time: 12:30 p.m. EST
- Game weather: 38 °F (3 °C), mostly cloudy
- Game attendance: 54,440
- Referee: Ben Dreith
- TV announcers (CBS): Pat Summerall (play-by-play) and John Madden (color commentator)

Game information

First quarter

- WAS – John Riggins 3-yard run (Mark Moseley kick). Redskins 7–0.
- WAS – Art Monk 40-yard pass from Joe Theismann (Mark Moseley kick). Redskins 14–0.
- WAS – Mark Moseley 42-yard field goal. Redskins 17–0.

Second quarter

- WAS – John Riggins 1-yard run (Mark Moseley kick). Redskins 24–0.
- LA – Preston Dennard 32-yard pass from Vince Ferragamo (Mike Lansford kick). Redskins 24–7.
- WAS – Art Monk 21-yard pass from Joe Theismann (Mark Moseley kick). Redskins 31–7.
- WAS – John Riggins 1-yard run (Mark Moseley kick). Redskins 38–7.

Third quarter

- WAS – Mark Moseley 36-yard field goal. Redskins 41–7.
- WAS – Mark Moseley 41-yard field goal. Redskins 44–7.

Fourth quarter

- WAS – Darrell Green 72-yard interception return (Mark Moseley kick). Redskins 51–7.

Top passers

- LA – Vince Ferragamo – 20/43, 175 yards, TD, 3 INT
- WAS – Joe Theismann – 18/23, 302 yards, 2 TD

Top rushers

- LA – A. J. Jones – 4 rushes, 28 yards
- WAS – John Riggins – 25 rushes, 119 yards, 3 TD

Top receivers

- LA – Preston Dennard – 2 receptions, 50 yards, TD
- WAS – Charlie Brown – 6 receptions, 171 yards

The Redskins crushed the Rams by scoring on their first five possessions on their way to a 51–7 win, breaking the then-record for the largest margin of victory in their team history.

Washington drove 65 yards in eight plays on their opening possession, including NFL MVP Joe Theismann's 29-yard completion to Charlie Brown on third down and 5, while John Riggins rushed six times for 23 yards and scored with a 3-yard touchdown run. Five minutes later, Theismann threw a 40-yard touchdown pass to receiver Art Monk. An interception by Anthony Washington then set up kicker Mark Moseley's 42-yard field goal with less than a minute left in the first quarter. Nick Giaquinto then returned a punt 48 yards to set up a one-yard touchdown run by Riggins to give the Redskins a 24–0 lead only a minute into the second quarter.

At this point, LA finally managed to respond with Vince Ferragamo's 32-yard touchdown pass to Preston Dennard, cutting the score to 24–7. But this was as close as it would get, as the Redskins added two more touchdowns before halftime, a 21-yard catch by Monk and a 1-yard run by Riggins.

Moseley's two field goals were the only scoring in the third quarter. Then in the fourth quarter, defensive back Darrell Green intercepted a pass from Ferragamo after it bounced off Eric Dickerson and returned it 72 yards for a touchdown.

Riggins recorded 119 yards and three touchdowns. Theismann completed 18 of 23 passes for 302 yards and two touchdowns with no interceptions. Brown caught six passes for 171 yards. Meanwhile, Ferragamo completed only 20 of 43 passes for 175 yards and a touchdown, with three interceptions. And Dickerson, who led the league in rushing during the regular season, was limited to only 16 yards on 10 carries, and nine yards on six receptions.

The Rams' loss meant that the following week's title game was the first NFC Championship Game to not involve either them or the Dallas Cowboys.

This was the third postseason meeting between the Rams and Redskins. Los Angeles won both previous meetings.

Previous playoff games
Los Angeles/ Cleveland Rams leads 2–0 in all-time playoff games

1945

Washington Redskins 14 @ Cleveland Rams 15

1945 NFL Championship Game

1974

Washington Redskins 10 @ Los Angeles Rams 19

1974 NFC Divisional playoffs

==== AFC: Los Angeles Raiders 38, Pittsburgh Steelers 10 ====
Pittsburgh Steelers vs. Los Angeles Raiders – Game summary

Quarter	1	2	3	4	Total
Steelers	3	0	7	0	10
Raiders	7	10	21	0	38

at Los Angeles Memorial Coliseum, Los Angeles, California

- Game time: 4:00 p.m. EST/1:00 p.m. PST
- Game weather: 71 °F (22 °C), sunny
- Game attendance: 90,380
- Referee: Gene Barth
- TV announcers (NBC): Dick Enberg (play-by-play) and Merlin Olsen (color commentator)

Game information

First quarter

- PIT – Gary Anderson 17-yard field goal. Steelers 3–0.
- RAI – Lester Hayes 18-yard interception return (Chris Bahr kick). Raiders 7–3.

Second quarter

- RAI – Marcus Allen 4-yard run (Chris Bahr kick). Raiders 14–3.
- RAI – Chris Bahr 45-yard field goal. Raiders 17–3.

Third quarter

- RAI – Kenny King 9-yard run (Chris Bahr kick). Raiders 24–3.
- RAI – Marcus Allen 49-yard run (Chris Bahr kick). Raiders 31–3.
- PIT – John Stallworth 58-yard pass from Cliff Stoudt (Gary Anderson kick). Raiders 31–10.
- RAI – Frank Hawkins 2-yard run (Chris Bahr kick). Raiders 38–10.

Fourth quarter

- No scoring plays.

Top passers

- PIT – Cliff Stoudt – 10/22, 187 yards, TD, INT
- RAI – Jim Plunkett – 21/34, 232 yards

Top rushers

- PIT – Cliff Stoudt – 9 rushes, 50 yards
- RAI – Marcus Allen – 13 rushes, 121 yards, 2 TD

Top receivers

- PIT – John Stallworth – 1 receptions, 58 yards, TD
- RAI – Todd Christensen – 7 receptions, 88 yards

The Raiders scored three touchdowns in the third quarter en route to a 38–10 win over the Steelers, who were playing without Hall of Fame quarterback Terry Bradshaw due to injury.

In the first quarter, a 15-yard run by Steelers running back Frank Pollard and Cliff Stoudt's 44-yard completion to Wayne Capers sparked a 78-yard drive, but when faced with fourth down and inches near the goal line, they opted for kicker Gary Anderson's 17-yard field goal. The Steelers defense forced a punt on the next drive, but Ray Guy's 34-yard kick pinned them on their own 14-yard line, and on the next play, Raiders defensive back Lester Hayes returned an interception 18 yards for a touchdown, making the score 7–3.

After forcing a punt, Los Angeles running back Marcus Allen started off a drive with two carries for 13 yards. Then Jim Plunkett got his team rolling, completing a 9-yard pass to tight end Todd Christensen, a 17-yard pass to Allen, and two passes to Cliff Branch for 34 yards, moving the ball to the Steelers 5-yard line. Allen eventually finished the drive with a 4-yard touchdown run, increasing the Raiders lead to 14–3 in the second quarter. Later on, after Los Angeles received a Steelers punt with 1:02 left in the half, Allen's 21-yard run and Plunkett's 17-yard completion to Branch set up a 45-yard field goal from Chris Bahr, giving the Raiders a 17–3 halftime lead.

The Raiders then scored three touchdowns in the third quarter to put the game out of reach. First they took the opening kickoff and stormed 72 yards to a 9-yard touchdown run by Kenny King. Then after a punt, Allen scored on a 49-yard touchdown run, increasing his team's lead to 31–3. Pittsburgh managed to respond with Stoudt's 58-yard touchdown pass to receiver John Stallworth. But Los Angeles stormed right back, scoring on Frank Hawkins' 2-yard touchdown run to make the score 38–10. This turned out to be the last score of the game, as both teams' defenses took over during the fourth quarter.

Allen finished the game with 121 rushing yards and two touchdowns on just 13 carries, while also catching five passes for 38 yards. Raiders defensive end Lyle Alzado had 2.5 sacks.

This was the sixth postseason meeting between the Steelers and Raiders. Pittsburgh had won three of the previous five meetings when the Raiders were based in Oakland. This would be the only postseason meeting with the Raiders playing in Los Angeles.

Previous playoff games
Pittsburgh leads 3–2 in all-time playoff games

1972

Oakland Raiders 7 @ Pittsburgh Steelers 13

1972 AFC Divisional playoffs

1973

Pittsburgh Steelers 14 @ Oakland Raiders 33

1973 AFC Divisional playoffs

1974

Pittsburgh Steelers 24 @ Oakland Raiders 13

1974 AFC Championship Game

1975

Oakland Raiders 10 @ Pittsburgh Steelers 16

1975 AFC Championship Game

1976

Pittsburgh Steelers 7 @ Oakland Raiders 24

1976 AFC Championship Game

== Conference championships ==
=== Sunday, January 8, 1984 ===
==== NFC: Washington Redskins 24, San Francisco 49ers 21 ====
San Francisco 49ers vs. Washington Redskins – Game summary

Quarter	1	2	3	4	Total
49ers	0	0	0	21	21
Redskins	0	7	14	3	24

at Robert F. Kennedy Memorial Stadium, Washington, D.C.

- Game time: 12:30 p.m. EST
- Game weather: 39 °F (4 °C), mostly cloudy
- Game attendance: 55,363
- Referee: Jerry Markbreit
- TV announcers (CBS): Pat Summerall (play-by-play) and John Madden (color commentator)

Game information

First quarter

- No scoring plays.

Second quarter

- WAS – John Riggins 4-yard run (Mark Moseley kick). Redskins 7–0.

Third quarter

- WAS – John Riggins 1-yard run (Mark Moseley kick). Redskins 14–0.
- WAS – Charlie Brown 70-yard pass from Joe Theismann (Mark Moseley kick). Redskins 21–0.

Fourth quarter

- SF – Mike Wilson 5-yard pass from Joe Montana (Ray Wersching kick). Redskins 21–7.
- SF – Freddie Solomon 76-yard pass from Joe Montana (Ray Wersching kick). Redskins 21–14.
- SF – Mike Wilson 12-yard pass from Joe Montana (Ray Wersching kick). Tied 21–21.
- WAS – Mark Moseley 25-yard field goal. Redskins 24–21.

Top passers

- SF – Joe Montana – 27/48, 347 yards, 3 TD, INT
- WAS – Joe Theismann – 14/26, 229 yards, TD, INT

Top rushers

- SF – Wendell Tyler – 8 rushes, 44 yards
- WAS – John Riggins – 36 rushes, 123 yards, 2 TD

Top receivers

- SF – Freddie Solomon – 4 receptions, 106 yards, TD
- WAS – Charlie Brown – 5 receptions, 137 yards, TD

After the 49ers erased a 21–0 fourth quarter deficit, two controversial penalties against San Francisco led to the Redskins' kicker Mark Moseley overcoming an awful day and kicking the winning field goal.

The first quarter was scoreless. The closest either team came was Washington's drive inside the 49ers 30-yard line that ended when Joe Washington lost a fumble that was recovered by San Francisco lineman Lawrence Pillers. In the second quarter, Washington managed to fool the 49ers with a trick play when punt returner Nick Giaquinto threw the ball across the field to Darrell Green who took it all the way to the end zone, but Giaquinto inadvertently threw a forward pass rather than a lateral and the score was called back. Washington fans and news media at the time disputed whether this was actually a forward pass, calling it the "Micrometer Play." The suggestion was that one would need a high precision measuring device to determine that the play was indeed a forward pass, and that the referees got the call wrong. The Redskins still managed to drive into 49ers territory, but ended up with no points when Moseley's 45-yard field goal attempt went wide right.

After forcing a punt, Joe Theismann's 46-yard completion to tight end Clint Didier moved the ball to the 49ers 18-yard line, setting up a 4-yard touchdown run by fullback John Riggins with 6:16 left in the half. Later in the quarter, the Redskins drove deep into San Francisco territory, featuring a fourth down run by Jeff Hayes on a fake punt, but once again Moseley sent a field goal attempt wide right, this time from 35 yards, and the score remained 7–0 at the end of the half.

San Francisco started the second half with a drive into Washington territory, aided by a controversial ruling in which running back Wendell Tyler dropped the ball just a second after catching it and then dove on it. Officials ruled the play a fumble and recovery for the 49ers rather than an incompletion. But kicker Ray Wersching later slipped on the muddy field while attempting a 50-yard field goal and it fell well short. On Washington's next drive, they ran another trick play, this time a pass from Riggins, who threw a 36-yard completion to Charlie Brown inside the 49ers 10-yard line. But all that led to was Moseley's third missed field goal attempt of the day, this one from 38 yards, that he once again sent wide right.

Midway through the third quarter, San Francisco receiver Freddie Solomon lost a fumble while being tackled by Green that linebacker Rich Milot recovered on the 49ers 36-yard line. A few plays later, a pass interference penalty on defensive back Ronnie Lott moved the ball to the 6-yard line, and Riggins took it the final six yards to the end zone with three more runs, making the score 14–0. Then on their next drive, Theismann completed a 70-yard touchdown pass to Brown, giving Washington a 21–0 lead with just over a minute left until the final quarter.

But with 14:37 left in the game, 49ers quarterback Joe Montana completed a 5-yard touchdown pass to Mike Wilson. San Francisco subsequently forced a punt, but returner Dana McLemore fumbled the ball and Washington's Mark Murphy recovered it. Still, the Redskins were unable to capitalize, failing to get a first down and once again coming up empty when Moseley missed his fourth field goal attempt of the day, this time short from 41 yards. On the next play, Solomon caught a 76-yard touchdown pass from Montana. Later with 7:08 remaining, Wilson tied the game with a 12-yard touchdown reception.

The Redskins then marched on a 13-play, 78-yard drive that took 6:12 off the clock and set up Moseley's 25-yard field goal with 40 seconds left in the game. This possession was aided by two controversial penalties:

1. On second down and 10 on the San Francisco 45-yard line, Theismann threw a long incompletion intended for wide receiver Art Monk, but cornerback Eric Wright was called for pass interference at the 18-yard line. It seemed that nobody had a reasonable chance to catch the ball, which, under the rule, would have nullified any pass interference penalty. San Francisco head coach Bill Walsh was quoted after the game as saying "It could not have been caught by a 10-foot Boston Celtic."
2. On third down and 5 from the San Francisco 13-yard line, Lott was called for holding on what seemed to be a harmless act with Brown far away from where the pass fell incomplete.

The 49ers got the ball back one last time, but Montana attempting a Hail Mary pass was intercepted by Vernon Dean on the final play of the game, sealing Washington's victory.

Brown finished the game with five receptions for 137 yards and a touchdown, while Riggins rushed for 123 yards and two touchdowns. In addition, his 36-yard completion to Brown was the only completion he threw during his 14-season career. This was the only postseason meeting between Hall of Fame coaches Bill Walsh and Joe Gibbs, whose teams would combine for six Super Bowl appearances and five Super Bowl wins during the 1980s.

The game was featured as part of the NFL's Greatest Games, known as The Forgotten Classic.

This was the second postseason meeting between the 49ers and Redskins. San Francisco won the only previous meeting.

Previous playoff games
San Francisco leads 1–0 in all-time playoff games

1971

Washington Redskins 20 @ San Francisco 49ers 24

1971 NFC Divisional playoffs

==== AFC: Los Angeles Raiders 30, Seattle Seahawks 14 ====
Seattle Seahawks vs. Los Angeles Raiders – Game summary

Quarter	1	2	3	4	Total
Seahawks	0	0	7	7	14
Raiders	3	17	7	3	30

at Los Angeles Memorial Coliseum, Los Angeles, California

- Game time: 4:00 p.m. EST/1:00 p.m. PST
- Game weather: 58 °F (14 °C), drizzle
- Game attendance: 91,445
- Referee: Dick Jorgensen
- TV announcers (NBC): Dick Enberg (play-by-play) and Merlin Olsen (color commentator)

Game information

First quarter

- RAI – Chris Bahr 20-yard field goal. Raiders 3–0.

Second quarter

- RAI – Frank Hawkins 1-yard run (Chris Bahr kick). Raiders 10–0.
- RAI – Frank Hawkins 5-yard run (Chris Bahr kick). Raiders 17–0.
- RAI – Chris Bahr 45-yard field goal. Raiders 20–0.

Third quarter

- RAI – Marcus Allen 3-yard pass from Jim Plunkett (Chris Bahr kick). Raiders 27–0.
- SEA – Dan Doornink 11-yard pass from Jim Zorn (Norm Johnson kick). Raiders 27–7.

Fourth quarter

- RAI – Chris Bahr 35-yard field goal. Raiders 30–7.
- SEA – Charle Young 9-yard pass from Jim Zorn (Norm Johnson kick). Raiders 30–14.

Top passers

- SEA – Jim Zorn – 14/27, 134 yards, 2 TD, 2 INT
- RAI – Jim Plunkett – 17/24, 214 yards, TD, 2 INT

Top rushers

- SEA – Curt Warner – 11 rushes, 26 yards
- RAI – Marcus Allen – 25 rushes, 154 yards

Top receivers

- SEA – Paul Johns – 5 receptions, 49 yards
- RAI – Malcolm Barnwell – 5 receptions, 116 yards

Seattle had defeated Los Angeles twice during the regular season, but this game had a very different outcome. The Raiders outgained Seattle in total yards 405–197, intercepted five passes, jumped to a 20–0 halftime lead, and overcame four turnovers of their own en route to a 30–14 victory. The Seahawks were held to 65 rushing yards while Raiders running back Marcus Allen ran for 154 yards, caught seven passes for 62 yards, and scored two touchdowns.

Seahawks running back David Hughes returned the opening kickoff 34 yards to the 40-yard line, and his team drove to the Raiders 34 from there. But defensive back Lester Hayes picked off a pass from Dave Krieg and returned it 44 yards to the Seattle 26. On the Raiders ensuing drive, a 19-yard run by Allen set up a 20-yard field goal by Chris Bahr. In the second quarter, Allen broke off a 16-yard run, while Raiders quarterback Jim Plunkett completed passes to Cliff Branch and Malcolm Barnwell for gains of 11 and 20 yards on a 61-yard drive that ended with Frank Hawkins' 1-yard touchdown run. Then Seattle went three and out and LA got the ball back with good position on their 40-yard line. Plunkett's 49-yard completion to Barnwell then set up Hawkins' second rushing touchdown, making the score 17–0. With 1:02 left in the half, Seattle desperately tried to put some points on the board before halftime, but defensive back Mike Davis intercepted a pass from Krieg at his own 40-yard line. A 20-yard completion from Plunkett to Barnwell then set up Bahr's 45-yard field goal to give the Raiders a 20–0 halftime lead.

In the second half, Seattle finally got a scoring opportunity when Hawkins fumbled the ball on the first play from scrimmage and the Seahawks recovered. However, all they got from this was Krieg's third interception, this one to linebacker Matt Millen on the first play after the fumble. At this point, Krieg was benched and replaced by backup Jim Zorn. Meanwhile, LA drove to the Seahawks 9-yard line. Defensive back Gregg Johnson intercepted a pass from Plunkett in the end zone to keep his team in the game, but even this turned out to be insufficient. Just two plays later, Davis recorded his second interception of the day, this one on the Seattle 46. On the next play, Allen took off for a 43-yard burst, and then caught a 3-yard touchdown pass to make the score 27–0.

After being completely dominated up to that point, Seattle finally managed to strike back, moving the ball 74 yards in 10 plays and scoring on Zorn's 11-yard touchdown pass to running back Dan Doornink. Then Seattle linebacker Bruce Scholtz intercepted a pass that bounced out of Barnwell's hands on the Seahawks 25-yard line, but once again Los Angeles' defense proved too formidable, as a 2-yard loss on a screen pass to Curt Warner, a holding penalty, and incomplete passes pushed Seattle out of field goal range and forced a punt.

The start of the fourth quarter saw the Seahawks blow another scoring chance when Vann McElroy intercepted a pass from Zorn after the team had recovered Plunkett's fumbled pitch to Allen on the Los Angeles 25-yard line. Then the next time they had the ball, they drove to the LA 40-yard line, only to see Greg Townsend sack Zorn for a 23-yard loss on fourth down and 4. After the turnover on downs, Bahr kicked a 35-yard field goal to give the Raiders an insurmountable 30–7 lead with 3:57 left. At this point, all that remained was Zorn's meaningless touchdown pass to tight end Charle Young, making the final score 30–14.

Warner, the AFC's leading rusher during the regular season, was held to just 26 yards on 11 carries. Barnwell finished the game with a career postseason high five receptions for 116 yards. Townsend had two sacks.

This was the first postseason meeting between the Seahawks and Raiders.

== Super Bowl XVIII: Los Angeles Raiders 38, Washington Redskins 9 ==
Super Bowl XVIII – Washington Redskins vs. Los Angeles Raiders – Game summary

Quarter	1	2	3	4	Total
Redskins (NFC)	0	3	6	0	9
Raiders (AFC)	7	14	14	3	38

at Tampa Stadium, Tampa, Florida

- Date: January 22, 1984
- Game attendance: 72,920
- Referee: Gene Barth
- TV announcers (CBS): Pat Summerall (play-by-play) and John Madden (color commentator)

This was the first Super Bowl meeting between the Redskins and Raiders.

== Quotes ==
Bill King of KRLA - calling the first touchdown of Super Bowl XVIII in 1984 for the Raiders. -

There's the snap... it is blocked by Derrick Jensen, going into the end zone... Raiders after it... Three men on it... TOUCHDOWN RAIDERS! Holy Toledo, what a start!

Bill King of KRLA - calling a touchdown by Cliff Branch in Super Bowl XVIII in 1984 for the Raiders. -

Plunkett looks... throws... Branch... TOUCHDOWN RAIDERS!

Bill King of KRLA - calling a touchdown by Jack Squirek in Super Bowl XVIII in 1984 for the Raiders. -

Theismann back... looks off to the left, he fires it out there... INTERCEPTED! JACK SQUIREK! TOUCHDOWN RAIDERS! I DON'T BELIEVE IT! HOLY TOLEDO!!!

Bill King of KRLA - calling the first touchdown of Marcus Allen in Super Bowl XVIII in 1984 for the Raiders. -

Plunkett giving the ball here to Allen, cuts back over the middle... dances...3, 2, 1, TOUCHDOWN RAIDERS! A marvelous piece of zig-zag dancing!

Bill King of KRLA - calling the second touchdown of Marcus Allen in Super Bowl XVIII in 1984 for the Raiders. -

Plunkett giving to Allen, setting a wide left... he has to reverse his field... he now gets away for a moment... cuts back into the 30... 35... 40... races past two men into the 50... down to the 40... picking up a blocker... to the 20... to the 10... to the 5... TOUCHDOWN RAIDERS! HOLY TOLEDO! 74 YARDS! The Raiders are mobbing Marcus Allen who has just stood a crowd of 72,000 on his collective ear.
