= 1983 Seattle Seahawks season =

American football team season

- Owner: The Nordstrom family
- General manager: Mike McCormack
- Head coach: Chuck Knox
- Offensive coordinator: Ray Prochaska
- Defensive coordinator: Tom Catlin
- Home stadium: Kingdome

Results
- Record: 9–7
- Division place: 2nd AFC West
- Playoffs: Won Wild Card Playoffs (vs. Broncos) 31–7; Won Divisional Playoffs (at Dolphins) 27–20; Lost AFC Championship (at Raiders) 14–30
- All-Pros: RB Curt Warner (2nd team); SS Kenny Easley (1st team)
- Pro Bowlers: RB Curt Warner; SS Kenny Easley

The 1983 Seattle Seahawks season was the team's 8th season with the National Football League (NFL).

The 1983 season was the first season head coach Chuck Knox coached the team. It was also the first season in which the Seahawks made the AFC playoffs, where they won the first two postseason games in franchise history, before losing in the AFC Championship Game to the eventual Super Bowl champion Los Angeles Raiders 30–14. The AFC Championship game against the Raiders would be the only time the Seahawks would appear in the AFC Championship Game, as they failed to appear in one from 1984 to 2001, the rest of their time in the AFC. They would not reach a conference championship again until 2005, when they were in the NFC West. During the offseason, the Seahawks changed the color of the facemasks on their helmets from gray to blue and added the Seahawk helmet logo to the jersey sleeves (which wrapped around).

== Offseason ==
The Seattle Seahawks hired Chuck Knox, a coach capable of creating comebacks for teams. They also modified their uniforms, incorporating striping trim on the jersey collars, and incorprorating the Seahawks logo onto the jersey's sleeves. The TV numbers were moved from the jersey sleeves to the shoulders. The helmet facemasks became blue, and the socks lost their stripes and became all blue. The uniform would remain basically unchanged through the 2001 season.

=== NFL draft ===
1983 Seattle Seahawks draft
| Round | Pick | Player | Position | College | Notes |
| 1 | 3 | Curt Warner * | Running back | Penn State | |
| 5 | 123 | Chris Castor | Wide receiver | Duke | |
| 6 | 150 | Reginald Gipson | Running Back | Alabama A&M | |
| 7 | 177 | Sam Merriman | Linebacker | Idaho | |
| 8 | 210 | Matt Hernandez | Offensive tackle | Purdue | |
| 9 | 236 | Bob Clasby | Defensive end | Notre Dame | |
| 10 | 263 | Pete Speros | Guard | Penn State | |
| 11 | 290 | Bob Mayberry | Guard | Clemson | |
| 12 | 317 | Don Dow | Offensive tackle | Washington | |
Made roster

=== Undrafted free agents ===
1983 undrafted free agents of note
| Player | Position | College |
|---|---|---|
| John Ball | Fullback | Texas Southern |
| Reggie Bazel | Fullback | Tennessee Tech |
| Darrell Dickey | Quarterback | Kansas State |
| Steve Ingalls | Tackle | Northern Iowa |

== Personnel ==
=== Staff ===
1983 Seattle Seahawks staff
| Front office: President/general manager – Mike McCormack; Assistant general manager – Chuck Allen; Player personnel director – Dick Mansperger; Pro personnel assistant – Randy Mueller; Head athletic trainer - Jim Whitesel; Assistant athletic trainer - John Kasik; Head coaches: Head coach – Chuck Knox; Assistant head coach – Tom Catlin; Offensive coaches: Offensive coordinator/offensive line – Ray Prochaska; Quarterbacks – Ken Meyer; Offensive backs – Chick Harris; Receivers – Steve Moore; Tight ends – Rusty Tillman | Defensive coaches: Defensive coordinator/linebackers – Tom Catlin; Defensive line – George Dyer; Defensive backs – Ralph Hawkins; Special assignments – Joe Vitt; Special teams coaches: Special teams – Rusty Tillman |

=== Final roster ===
1983 Seattle Seahawks roster
| Quarterbacks (QB): 17 Dave Krieg; 10 Jim Zorn; Running backs (RB): 32 Cullen Bryant; 31 Zachary Dixon; 33 Dan Doornink; 46 David Hughes; 37 Eric Lane; 28 Curt Warner; Wide receivers (WR): 83 Chris Castor; 29 Harold Jackson; 85 Paul Johns; 80 Steve Largent; 89 Byron Walker; Tight ends (TE): 88 Pete Metzelaars; 86 Mike Tice; 87 Charle Young | Offensive linemen (OL): 76 Steve August T; 65 Edwin Bailey G; 59 Blair Bush C; 66 Bill Dugan G; 64 Ron Essink T; 69 Matt Hernandez T; 62 Kani Kauahi C; 67 Reggie McKenzie G; 61 Robert Pratt G; Defensive linemen (DL): 77 Jeff Bryant DE; 84 Sam Clancy DE; 79 Jacob Green DE; 70 Darrell Irvin DE; 72 Joe Nash NT; 74 Manu Tuiasosopo NT | Linebackers (LB): 53 Keith Butler ILB; 56 Greg Gaines OLB; 63 Mark Hicks OLB; 55 Michael Jackson OLB; 51 Sam Merriman ILB; 52 Joe Norman ILB; 57 Shelton Robinson ILB; 58 Bruce Scholtz OLB; Defensive backs (DB): 22 Dave Brown CB; 35 Don Dufek FS; 45 Kenny Easley SS; 44 John Harris FS; 27 Gregg Johnson CB/S; 26 Kerry Justin CB; 21 Paul Moyer SS; 42 Keith Simpson CB; Special teams (ST): 9 Norm Johnson K; 8 Jeff West P | Reserve: 12 Sam Adkins QB (IR); 19 Freddie Brown WR (IR); 50 Brian Flones LB (IR); 75 Robert Hardy NT (IR); 54 Eugene Williams LB (IR); 15 Steve Wray QB (IR); Rookies in italics 49 active, 6 reserve |

- (*) Denotes players that were selected for the 1984 Pro Bowl.

== Schedule ==
=== Preseason ===
| Week | Date | Opponent | Result | Record | Venue | Recap |
|---|---|---|---|---|---|---|
| 1 | August 5 | at Denver Broncos | **L** 7–10 | 0–1 | Mile High Stadium | Recap |
| 2 | August 12 | Green Bay Packers | **W** 38–21 | 1–1 | Kingdome | Recap |
| 3 | August 19 | Minnesota Vikings | **L** 17–19 | 1–2 | Kingdome | Recap |
| 4 | August 26 | at San Francisco 49ers | **W** 20–6 | 2–2 | Candlestick Park | Recap |

Source: Seahawks Media Guides

=== Regular season ===
Divisional matchups have the AFC West playing the NFC East.

| Week | Date | Opponent | Result | Record | Venue | Recap |
|---|---|---|---|---|---|---|
| 1 | September 4 | at **Kansas City Chiefs** | **L** 13–17 | 0–1 | Arrowhead Stadium | Recap |
| 2 | September 11 | at New York Jets | **W** 17–10 | 1–1 | Shea Stadium | Recap |
| 3 | September 18 | **San Diego Chargers** | **W** 34–31 | 2–1 | Kingdome | Recap |
| 4 | September 25 | Washington Redskins | **L** 17–27 | 2–2 | Kingdome | Recap |
| 5 | October 2 | at Cleveland Browns | **W** 24–9 | 3–2 | Cleveland Stadium | Recap |
| 6 | October 9 | at **San Diego Chargers** | **L** 21–28 | 3–3 | Jack Murphy Stadium | Recap |
| 7 | October 16 | **Los Angeles Raiders** | **W** 38–36 | 4–3 | Kingdome | Recap |
| 8 | October 23 | Pittsburgh Steelers | **L** 21–27 | 4–4 | Kingdome | Recap |
| 9 | October 30 | at **Los Angeles Raiders** | **W** 34–21 | 5–4 | Los Angeles Memorial Coliseum | Recap |
| 10 | November 6 | **Denver Broncos** | **W** 27–19 | 6–4 | Kingdome | Recap |
| 11 | November 13 | at St. Louis Cardinals | **L** 28–33 | 6–5 | Busch Stadium | Recap |
| 12 | November 20 | at **Denver Broncos** | **L** 27–38 | 6–6 | Mile High Stadium | Recap |
| 13 | November 27 | **Kansas City Chiefs** | **W** 51–48 (OT) | 7–6 | Kingdome | Recap |
| 14 | December 4 | Dallas Cowboys | **L** 10–35 | 7–7 | Kingdome | Recap |
| 15 | December 11 | at New York Giants | **W** 17–12 | 8–7 | Giants Stadium | Recap |
| 16 | December 18 | New England Patriots | **W** 24–6 | 9–7 | Kingdome | Recap |
Note: Intra-division opponents are in **bold** text.

Source: 1983 NFL season results

=== Postseason ===
The Seahawks entered the playoffs for the first time in franchise history, after two close attempts in 1978 and 1979.

| Round | Date | Opponent (seed) | Result | Record | Venue | Recap |
|---|---|---|---|---|---|---|
| Wild Card | December 24 | Denver Broncos (5) | **W** 31–7 | 1–0 | Kingdome | Recap |
| Divisional | December 31 | at Miami Dolphins (2) | **W** 27–20 | 2–0 | Miami Orange Bowl | Recap |
| AFC Championship | January 8, 1984 | at Los Angeles Raiders (1) | **L** 14–30 | 2–1 | Los Angeles Memorial Coliseum | Recap |

== Standings ==
AFC West
| | W | L | T | PCT | DIV | CONF | PF | PA | STK |
|---|---|---|---|---|---|---|---|---|---|
| ^{(1)} Los Angeles Raiders | 12 | 4 | 0 | .750 | 6–2 | 10–2 | 442 | 338 | W1 |
| ^{(4)} Seattle Seahawks | 9 | 7 | 0 | .563 | 5–3 | 8–4 | 403 | 397 | W2 |
| ^{(5)} Denver Broncos | 9 | 7 | 0 | .563 | 3–5 | 9–5 | 302 | 327 | L1 |
| San Diego Chargers | 6 | 10 | 0 | .375 | 4–4 | 4–8 | 358 | 462 | L1 |
| Kansas City Chiefs | 6 | 10 | 0 | .375 | 2–6 | 4–8 | 386 | 367 | W1 |

== Game summaries ==
=== Preseason ===
==== Week P1: at Denver Broncos ====
Preseason Week One: Seattle Seahawks at Denver Broncos – Game summary

| Quarter | 1 | 2 | 3 | 4 | Total |
|---|---|---|---|---|---|
| Seahawks | 0 | 7 | 0 | 0 | 7 |
| Broncos | 3 | 0 | 7 | 0 | 10 |

at Mile High Stadium, Denver, Colorado

- Date: August 5
- Game time: 7:00 pm local
- Game weather: cloudy, 70 °F (21 °C), 63% humidity, wind S 15 miles per hour (24 km/h)
- Game attendance: 53,887
- Referee: Ben Dreith
- TV announcers (KING): Tony Ventrella & Gene Washington
- Gamebook

==== Week P2: vs. Green Bay Packers ====
Preseason Week Two: Seattle Seahawks vs. Green Bay Packers – Game summary

| Quarter | 1 | 2 | 3 | 4 | Total |
|---|---|---|---|---|---|
| Packers | 7 | 14 | 0 | 0 | 21 |
| Seahawks | 7 | 14 | 7 | 10 | 38 |

at Kingdome, Seattle

- Date: August 12
- Game time: 7:32 pm local
- Game weather: indoors
- Game attendance: 54,443
- Referee: Jim Tunney
- Gamebook

==== Week P3: vs. Minnesota Vikings ====
Preseason Week Three: Seattle Seahawks vs. Minnesota Vikings – Game summary

| Quarter | 1 | 2 | 3 | 4 | Total |
|---|---|---|---|---|---|
| Vikings | 0 | 16 | 0 | 3 | 19 |
| Seahawks | 7 | 3 | 0 | 7 | 17 |

at Kingdome, Seattle

- Date: August 19
- Game time: 7:34 pm local
- Game weather: indoors
- Game attendance: 54,402
- Referee: Bob Frederic
- Gamebook

==== Week P4: at San Francisco 49ers ====
Preseason Week Four: Seattle Seahawks at San Francisco 49ers – Game summary

| Quarter | 1 | 2 | 3 | 4 | Total |
|---|---|---|---|---|---|
| Seahawks | 3 | 7 | 7 | 3 | 20 |
| 49ers | 3 | 0 | 3 | 0 | 6 |

at Candlestick Park, San Francisco

- Date: August 27
- Game time: 2:06 pm local
- Game weather: clear, 75 °F (24 °C), wind calm
- Game attendance: 47,074
- Referee: Jerry Markbreit
- TV: KIRO
- Gamebook

=== Regular season ===
==== Week 1: at Kansas City Chiefs ====
Week One: Seattle Seahawks at Kansas City Chiefs – Game summary

| Quarter | 1 | 2 | 3 | 4 | Total |
|---|---|---|---|---|---|
| Seahawks | 3 | 0 | 3 | 7 | 13 |
| Chiefs | 7 | 0 | 7 | 3 | 17 |

at Arrowhead Stadium, Kansas City, Missouri

- Date: September 4
- Game time: 3:01 pm local
- Game weather: clear, 94 °F (34 °C), 31% humidity, wind S 18 miles per hour (29 km/h)
- Game attendance: 42,531
- Referee: Fred Silva
- TV announcers (NBC): Jay Randolph and Gene Washington
- Gamebook

Game information

First quarter

- SEA – Norm Johnson 34-yard field goal, 12:14 (SEA 3–0)
- KC – Henry Marshall 12-yard pass from Bill Kenney (Nick Lowery kick), 7:33 (KC 7–3)

Second quarter

- SEA – Norm Johnson 48-yard field goal, 5:03 (KC 7–6)
- KC – Carlos Carson 18-yard pass from Bill Kenney (Nick Lowery kick), 0:49 (KC 14–6)

Third quarter

- No scoring plays

Fourth quarter

- KC – Nick Lowery 19-yard field goal, 6:18 (KC 17–6)
- SEA – Curt Warner 18-yard pass from Jim Zorn (Norm Johnson kick), 3:16 (KC 17–13)

Top passers

- SEA – Dave Krieg: 19/43, 206 yds, 1 TD, 2 INT
- KC – Bill Kenney: 19/32, 247 yds, 1 TD

Top rushers

- SEA – Curt Warner: 12 car, 93 yds
- KC – Billy Jackson: 19 car, 77 yds

Top receivers

- SEA – Curt Warner: 6 rec, 72 yds, 1 TD
- KC – Carlos Carson: 7 rec, 104 yds, 1 TD

Team – pass – rush – total – to

- SEA – 198 – 110 – 308 – 2
- KC – 245 – 120 – 365 – 1

==== Week 2: at New York Jets ====
Week Two: Seattle Seahawks at New York Jets – Game summary

| Quarter | 1 | 2 | 3 | 4 | Total |
|---|---|---|---|---|---|
| Seahawks | 0 | 10 | 0 | 7 | 17 |
| Jets | 0 | 3 | 0 | 7 | 10 |

at Shea Stadium, New York

- Date: September 11
- Game time: 4:01 pm local
- Game weather: clear, 95 °F (35 °C), 46% humidity, wind NW 12 miles per hour (19 km/h)
- Game attendance: 50,066
- Referee: Dick Jorgensen
- TV announcers (NBC): Dick Enberg and Merlin Olsen
- Gamebook

Game information

First quarter

- No scoring plays

Second quarter

- SEA – Curt Warner 7-yard run (Norm Johnson kick), 13:26 (SEA 7–0)
- SEA – Norm Johnson 40-yard field goal, 6:30 (SEA 10–0)
- NYJ – Pat Leahy 18-yard field goal, 0:22 (SEA 10–3)

Third quarter

- No scoring plays

Fourth quarter

- SEA – Curt Warner 15-yard run (Norm Johnson kick), 3:54 (SEA 17–3)
- NYJ – Wesley Walker 46-yard pass from Richard Todd (Pat Leahy kick), 3:10 (SEA 17–10)

Top passers

- SEA – Jim Zorn: 7/15, 81 yds
- NYJ – Richard Todd: 12/28, 222 yds, 1 TD, 3 INT

Top rushers

- SEA – Curt Warner: 24 car, 128 yds, 2 TD
- NYJ – Freeman McNeil: 22 car, 140 yds

Top receivers

- SEA – Steve Largent: 3 rec, 35 yds
- NYJ – Wesley Walker: 3 rec, 116 yds, 1 TD

Team – pass – rush – total – to

- SEA – 76 – 196 – 272 – 3
- NYJ – 205 – 174 – 379 – 7

==== Week 3: vs. San Diego Chargers ====
Week Three: Seattle Seahawks vs. San Diego Chargers – Game summary

| Quarter | 1 | 2 | 3 | 4 | Total |
|---|---|---|---|---|---|
| Chargers | 7 | 3 | 0 | 21 | 31 |
| Seahawks | 14 | 3 | 10 | 7 | 34 |

at Kingdome, Seattle

- Date: September 18
- Game time: 1:01 pm local
- Game weather: indoors
- Game attendance: 61,714
- Referee: Ben Dreith
- TV announcers (NBC): Don Criqui & Merlin Olsen
- Gamebook

Game information

First quarter

- SEA – Dan Doornink 2-yard run (Norm Johnson kick), 8:43 (SEA 7–0)
- SD – Charlie Joiner 25-yard pass from Dan Fouts (Rolf Benirschke kick), 6:29 (Tied 7–7)
- SEA – Steve Largent 5-yard pass from Jim Zorn (Norm Johnson kick), 1:38 (SEA 14–7)

Second quarter

- SEA – Norm Johnson 33-yard field goal, 2:00 (SEA 17–7)
- SD – Rolf Benirschke 26-yard field goal, 0:32 (SEA 17–10)

Third quarter

- SEA – Norm Johnson 43-yard field goal, 10:52 (SEA 20–10)
- SEA – Paul Moyer 19-yard interception return (Norm Johnson kick), 9:56 (SEA 27–10)

Fourth quarter

- SD – Eric Sievers 26-yard pass from Dan Fouts (Rolf Benirschke kick), 13:27 (SEA 27–17)
- SEA – Steve Largent 41-yard pass from Jim Zorn (Norm Johnson kick), 9:00 (SEA 34–17)
- SD – Bobby Duckworth 44-yard pass from Dan Fouts (Rolf Benirschke kick), 7:29 (SEA 34–24)
- SD – Eric Sievers 27-yard pass from Dan Fouts (Rolf Benirschke kick), 4:16 (SEA 34–31)

Top passers

- SD – Dan Fouts: 21/41, 338 yds, 4 TD, 3 INT
- SEA – Jim Zorn: 15/24, 173 yds, 2 TD, 1 INT

Top rushers

- SD – Chuck Muncie: 13 car, 64 yds
- SEA – Curt Warner: 22 car, 109 yds

Top receivers

- SD – Eric Sievers: 6 rec, 115 yds, 2 TD
- SEA – Steve Largent: 8 rec, 116 yds, 2 TD

Team – pass – rush – total – to

- SD – 332 – 99 – 431 – 3
- SEA – 162 – 206 – 368 – 3

==== Week 4: vs. Washington Redskins ====
Week Four: Seattle Seahawks vs. Washington Redskins – Game summary

| Quarter | 1 | 2 | 3 | 4 | Total |
|---|---|---|---|---|---|
| Redskins | 7 | 13 | 0 | 7 | 27 |
| Seahawks | 3 | 7 | 0 | 7 | 17 |

at Kingdome, Seattle

- Date: September 25
- Game time: 1:02 pm local
- Game weather: indoors
- Game attendance: 60,718
- Referee: Fred Wyant
- TV announcers (CBS): Jack Buck and Hank Stram
- Gamebook

Game information

First quarter

- WAS – John Riggins 1-yard run (Mark Moseley kick), 10:22 (WAS 7–0)
- SEA – Norm Johnson 27-yard field goal, 1:31 (WAS 7–3)

Second quarter

- WAS – Charlie Brown 64-yard pass from Joe Theismann (Mark Moseley kick), 14:10 (WAS 14–3)
- SEA – Steve Largent 13-yard pass from Jim Zorn (Norm Johnson kick), 9:28 (WAS 14–10)
- WAS – Alvin Garrett 47-yard pass from Joe Theismann (PAT failed), 0:56 (WAS 20–10)

Third quarter

- No scoring plays

Fourth quarter

- WAS – Rick Walker 4-yard pass from Joe Theismann (Mark Moseley kick), 5:07 (WAS 27–10)
- SEA – Steve Largent 7-yard pass from Jim Zorn (Norm Johnson kick), 3:51 (WAS 27–17)

Top passers

- WAS – Joe Theismann: 9/16, 162 yds, 3 TD
- SEA – Jim Zorn: 20/40, 241 yds, 2 TD, 1 INT

Top rushers

- WAS – John Riggins: 30 car, 83 yds, 1 TD
- SEA – Curt Warner: 15 car, 34 yds

Top receivers

- WAS – Alvin Garrett: 3 rec, 62 yds, 1 TD
- SEA – Steve Largent: 8 rec, 130 yds, 2 TD

Team – pass – rush – total – to

- WAS – 162 – 131 – 293 – 0
- SEA – 234 – 74 – 308 – 2

==== Week 5: at Cleveland Browns ====
Week Five: Seattle Seahawks at Cleveland Browns – Game summary

| Quarter | 1 | 2 | 3 | 4 | Total |
|---|---|---|---|---|---|
| Seahawks | 3 | 0 | 7 | 14 | 24 |
| Browns | 0 | 3 | 0 | 6 | 9 |

at Cleveland Stadium, Cleveland, Ohio

- Date: October 2
- Game time: 1:00 pm local
- Game weather: clear, 68 °F (20 °C), 68% humidity, wind S 10 miles per hour (16 km/h)
- Game attendance: 75,446
- Referee: Chuck Heberling
- TV announcers (NBC): Phil Stone and Dave Rowe
- Gamebook

Game information

First quarter

- SEA – Norm Johnson 24-yard field goal, 2:41 (SEA 3–0)

Second quarter

- CLE – Matt Bahr 40-yard field goal, 14:18 (Tied 3–3)

Third quarter

- SEA – Curt Warner 1-yard run (Norm Johnson kick), 12:37 (SEA 10–3)

Fourth quarter

- CLE – Boyce Green 5-yard pass from Brian Sipe (PAT failed), 12:37 (SEA 10–9)
- SEA – Curt Warner 1-yard run (Norm Johnson kick), 8:19 (SEA 17–9)
- SEA – Jacob Green 73-yard interception return (Norm Johnson kick), 1:50 (SEA 24–9)

Top passers

- SEA – Dave Krieg: 11/17, 122 yds, 1 INT
- CLE – Brian Sipe: 25/40, 310 yds, 1 TD, 3 INT

Top rushers

- SEA – Curt Warner: 24 car, 94 yds, 2 TD
- CLE – Mike Pruitt: 24 car, 107 yds

Top receivers

- SEA – Byron Walker: 1 rec, 32 yds
- CLE – Harry Holt: 6 rec, 77 yds

Team – pass – rush – total – to

- SEA – 122 – 137 – 259 – 1
- CLE – 280 – 125 – 405 – 4

==== Week 6: at San Diego Chargers ====
Week Six: Seattle Seahawks at San Diego Chargers – Game summary

| Quarter | 1 | 2 | 3 | 4 | Total |
|---|---|---|---|---|---|
| Seahawks | 7 | 14 | 0 | 0 | 21 |
| Chargers | 0 | 7 | 7 | 14 | 28 |

at Jack Murphy Stadium, San Diego, California

- Date: October 9
- Game time: 1:01 pm local
- Game weather: cloudy, 72 °F (22 °C), 84% humidity, wind WSW 12 miles per hour (19 km/h)
- Game attendance: 49,132
- Referee: Tom Dooley
- TV announcers (NBC): Jay Randolph and Reggie Rucker
- Gamebook

Game information

First quarter

- SEA – Harold Jackson 7-yard pass from Jim Zorn (Norm Johnson kick), 3:31 (SEA 7–0)

Second quarter

- SEA – Curt Warner 2-yard run (Norm Johnson kick), 10:21 (SEA 14–0)
- SEA – Curt Warner 2-yard run (Norm Johnson kick), 1:50 (SEA 21–0)
- SD – Kellen Winslow 12-yard pass from Ed Luther (Rolf Benirschke kick), 0:34 (SEA 21–7)

Third quarter

- SD – Bobby Duckworth 59-yard pass from Dan Fouts (Rolf Benirschke kick), 13:17 (SEA 21–14)

Fourth quarter

- SD – Chuck Muncie 1-yard run (Rolf Benirschke kick), 14:20 (Tied 21–21)
- SD – Andre Young 40-yard interception return (Norm Johnson kick), 2:04 (SEA 28–21)

Top passers

- SEA – Jim Zorn: 25/41, 295 yds, 1 TD, 1 INT
- SD – Dan Fouts: 28/36, 331 yds, 1 TD, 2 INT

Top rushers

- SEA – Curt Warner: 19 car, 73 yds, 2 TD
- SD – Chuck Muncie: 18 car, 76 yds, 1 TD

Top receivers

- SEA – Charle Young: 7 rec, 140 yds
- SD – Wes Chandler: 8 rec, 83 yds

Team – pass – rush – total – to

- SEA – 288 – 110 – 398 – 2
- SD – 318 – 94 – 412 – 5

==== Week 7: vs. Los Angeles Raiders ====
Week Seven: Seattle Seahawks vs. Los Angeles Raiders – Game summary

| Quarter | 1 | 2 | 3 | 4 | Total |
|---|---|---|---|---|---|
| Raiders | 7 | 10 | 5 | 14 | 36 |
| Seahawks | 7 | 0 | 17 | 14 | 38 |

at Kingdome, Seattle

- Date: October 16
- Game time: 1:02 pm local
- Game weather: indoors
- Game attendance: 60,967
- Referee: Jim Tunney
- TV announcers (NBC): Marv Albert and John Brodie
- Gamebook

Game information

First quarter

- LA – Todd Christensen 19-yard pass from Marcus Allen (Chris Bahr kick), 10:28 (LA 7–0)
- SEA – Dan Doornink 1-yard run (Norm Johnson kick), 1:57 (Tied 7–7)

Second quarter

- LA – Chris Bahr 32-yard field goal, 9:26 (LA 10–7)
- LA – Todd Christensen 12-yard pass from Jim Plunkett (Chris Bahr kick), 0:18 (LA 17–7)

Third quarter

- SEA – Jim Zorn 18-yard run (Norm Johnson kick), 13:16 (LA 17–14)
- SEA – Paul Johns 75-yard punt return (Norm Johnson kick), 9:13 (SEA 21–17)
- SEA – Norm Johnson 22-yard field goal, 7:50 (SEA 24–17)
- LA – Chris Bahr 42-yard field goal, 1:19 (SEA 24–20)
- LA – Safety, Lyle Alzado tackled Robert Pratt in end zone, 0:50 (SEA 24–22)

Fourth quarter

- SEA – Shelton Robinson 9-yard fumble return (Norm Johnson kick), 8:23 (SEA 31–22)
- SEA – Curt Warner 6-yard run (Norm Johnson kick), 7:20 (SEA 38–22)
- LA – Marcus Allen 1-yard pass from Marc Wilson (Chris Bahr kick), 0:47 (SEA 38–29)
- LA – Todd Christensen 22-yard pass from Marc Wilson (Chris Bahr kick), 0:12 (SEA 38–36)

Top passers

- LA – Jim Plunkett: 14/22, 139 yds, 1 TD, 3 INT
- SEA – Jim Zorn: 4/16, 13 yds

Top rushers

- LA – Marcus Allen: 18 car, 86 yds
- SEA – Curt Warner: 22 car, 75 yds, 1 TD

Top receivers

- LA – Todd Christensen: 11 rec, 152 yds, 3 TD
- SEA – Charle Young: 1 rec, 10 yds

Team – pass – rush – total – to

- LA – 199 – 183 – 382 – 8
- SEA – 2 – 151 – 153 – 1

==== Week 8: vs. Pittsburgh Steelers ====
Week Eight: Seattle Seahawks vs. Pittsburgh Steelers – Game summary

| Quarter | 1 | 2 | 3 | 4 | Total |
|---|---|---|---|---|---|
| Steelers | 7 | 17 | 0 | 3 | 27 |
| Seahawks | 0 | 0 | 7 | 14 | 21 |

at Kingdome, Seattle

- Date: October 23
- Game time: 1:01 pm local
- Game weather: indoors
- Game attendance: 61,615
- Referee: Gordon McCarter
- TV announcers (NBC): Dick Enberg and Merlin Olsen
- Gamebook

Game information

First quarter

- PIT – Franco Harris 9-yard run (Gary Anderson kick), 10:00 (PIT 7–0)

Second quarter

- PIT – Cliff Stoudt 1-yard run (Gary Anderson kick), 14:14 (PIT 14–0)
- PIT – Frank Pollard 1-yard run (Gary Anderson kick), 7:44 (PIT 21–0)
- PIT – Gary Anderson 20-yard field goal, 0:12 (PIT 24–0)

Third quarter

- SEA – Curt Warner 1-yard run (Norm Johnson kick), 0:02 (PIT 24–7)

Fourth quarter

- SEA – Steve Largent 21-yard pass from Dave Krieg (Norm Johnson kick), 14:02 (PIT 24–14)
- PIT – Gary Anderson 32-yard field goal, 7:37 (PIT 27–14)
- SEA – Paul Johns 26-yard pass from Dave Krieg (Norm Johnson kick), 4:19 (PIT 27–21)

Top passers

- PIT – Cliff Stoudt: 12/20, 186 yds
- SEA – Dave Krieg: 13/20, 214 yds, 2 TD

Top rushers

- PIT – Franco Harris: 31 car, 132 yds, 1 TD
- SEA – Curt Warner: 12 car, 48 yds, 1 TD

Top receivers

- PIT – Bennie Cunningham: 3 rec, 55 yds
- SEA – Paul Johns: 12 rec, 48 yds, 1 TD

Team – pass – rush – total – to

- PIT – 158 – 182 – 340 – 2
- SEA – 197 – 57 – 254 – 4

==== Week 9: at Los Angeles Raiders ====
Week Nine: Seattle Seahawks at Los Angeles Raiders – Game summary

| Quarter | 1 | 2 | 3 | 4 | Total |
|---|---|---|---|---|---|
| Seahawks | 0 | 17 | 7 | 10 | 34 |
| Raiders | 0 | 7 | 7 | 7 | 21 |

at Los Angeles Memorial Coliseum, Los Angeles

- Date: October 30
- Game time: 1:00 pm local
- Game weather: overcast, 74 °F (23 °C), 76% humidity, wind W 9 miles per hour (14 km/h)
- Game attendance: 49,708
- Referee: Jerry Seeman
- TV announcers (NBC): Dick Enberg & Merlin Olsen
- Gamebook

Game information

First quarter

- No scoring plays

Second quarter

- LA – Marcus Allen 1-yard run (Chris Bahr kick), 14:57 (LA 7–0)
- SEA – Shelton Robinson 12-yard fumble return (Norm Johnson kick), 9:18 (Tied 7–7)
- SEA – Norm Johnson 37-yard field goal, 3:49 (SEA 10–7)
- SEA – Charle Young 5-yard pass from Dave Krieg (Norm Johnson kick), 0:12 (SEA 17–7)

Third quarter

- LA – Don Hasselbeck 4-yard pass from Marc Wilson (Chris Bahr kick), 10:07 (SEA 17–14)

Fourth quarter

- SEA – Curt Warner 1-yard run (Norm Johnson kick), 5:09 (SEA 24–14)
- SEA – David Hughes 33-yard pass from Dave Krieg (Norm Johnson kick), 11:49 (SEA 31–14)
- LA – Dokie Williams 50-yard pass from Marc Wilson (Chris Bahr kick), 11:17 (SEA 31–21)
- SEA – Norm Johnson 44-yard field goal, 3:03 (SEA 34–21)

Top passers

- SEA – Dave Krieg: 13/22, 156 yds, 1 TD, 1 INT
- LA – Marc Wilson: 22/34, 297 yds, 2 TD, 4 INT

Top rushers

- SEA – Curt Warner: 23 car, 101 yds, 1 TD
- LA – Marc Wilson: 3 car, 35 yds

Top receivers

- SEA – Paul Johns: 5 rec, 64 yds
- LA – Marcus Allen: 8 rec, 104 yds

Team – pass – rush – total – to

- SEA – 169 – 183 – 351 – 1
- LA – 255 – 125 – 380 – 5

==== Week 10: vs. Denver Broncos ====
Week Ten: Seattle Seahawks vs. Denver Broncos – Game summary

| Quarter | 1 | 2 | 3 | 4 | Total |
|---|---|---|---|---|---|
| Broncos | 0 | 3 | 6 | 10 | 19 |
| Seahawks | 6 | 0 | 14 | 7 | 27 |

at Kingdome, Seattle

- Date: November 6
- Game time: 1:02 pm local
- Game weather: indoors
- Game attendance: 61,189
- Referee: Bob McElwee
- TV announcers (NBC): Merle Harmon and Dave Rowe
- Gamebook

Game information

First quarter

- SEA – Norm Johnson 42-yard field goal, 10:19 (SEA 3–0)
- SEA – Norm Johnson 18-yard field goal, 0:52 (SEA 6–0)

Second quarter

- DEN – Rich Karlis 38-yard field goal, 10:07 (SEA 6–3)

Third quarter

- SEA – Steve Largent 14-yard pass from Dave Krieg (Norm Johnson kick), 12:57 (SEA 13–3)
- SEA – Paul Johns 30-yard pass from Dave Krieg (Norm Johnson kick), 11:14 (SEA 20–3)
- DEN – Sammy Winder 1-yard run (PAT failed), 3:15 (SEA 20–9)

Fourth quarter

- DEN – Rich Karlis 43-yard field goal, 14:00 (SEA 20–12)
- SEA – Dave Krieg 10-yard run (Norm Johnson kick), 9:36 (SEA 27–12)
- DEN – Steve Watson 25-yard pass from John Elway (Rich Karlis kick), 6:01 (SEA 27–19)

Top passers

- DEN – John Elway: 8/15, 134 yds, 1 TD
- SEA – Dave Krieg: 14/23, 216 yds, 2 TD, 1 INT

Top rushers

- DEN – Gerald Willhite: 5 car, 37 yds
- SEA – Curt Warner: 25 car, 134 yds

Top receivers

- DEN – Steve Watson: 7 rec, 110 yds, 1 TD
- SEA – Dan Doornink: 2 rec, 54 yds

Team – pass – rush – total – to

- DEN – 222 – 135 – 357 – 3
- SEA – 216 – 183 – 399 – 1

==== Week 11: at St. Louis Cardinals ====
Week Eleven: Seattle Seahawks at St. Louis Cardinals – Game summary

| Quarter | 1 | 2 | 3 | 4 | Total |
|---|---|---|---|---|---|
| Seahawks | 7 | 14 | 0 | 7 | 28 |
| Cardinals | 7 | 21 | 0 | 5 | 33 |

at Busch Memorial Stadium, St. Louis, Missouri

- Date: November 13
- Game time: 1:00 pm local
- Game weather: cloudy, 40 °F (4 °C), 75% humidity, wind S 8 miles per hour (13 km/h)
- Game attendance: 33,280
- Referee: Ben Dreith
- TV announcers (NBC): Jay Randolph and Gene Washington
- Gamebook

Game information

First quarter

- STL – Roy Green 15-yard pass from Neil Lomax (Neil O'Donoghue kick), 7:31 (STL 7–0)
- SEA – Zachary Dixon 94-yard kickoff return (Norm Johnson kick), 7:24 (Tied 7–7)

Second quarter

- STL – Roy Green 23-yard pass from Neil Lomax (Neil O'Donoghue kick), 12:07 (STL 14–7)
- STL – Roy Green 7-yard pass from Neil Lomax (Neil O'Donoghue kick), 7:41 (STL 21–7)
- SEA – Steve Largent 15-yard pass from Dave Krieg (Norm Johnson kick), 4:18 (STL 21–14)
- STL – Roy Green 63-yard pass from Neil Lomax (Neil O'Donoghue kick), 3:06 (STL 28–14)
- SEA – Steve Largent 14-yard pass from Dave Krieg (Norm Johnson kick), 0:08 (STL 28–21)

Third quarter

- No scoring plays

Fourth quarter

- SEA – Steve Largent 45-yard pass from Dave Krieg (Norm Johnson kick), 13:09 (Tied 28–28)
- STL – Neil O'Donoghue 33-yard field goal, 7:50 (STL 31–28)
- STL – Safety, David Galloway tackled Dave Krieg in end zone, 0:11 (STL 33–28)

Top passers

- SEA – Dave Krieg: 13/26, 216 yds, 3 TD, 1 INT
- STL – Neil Lomax: 21/27, 253 yds, 4 TD

Top rushers

- SEA – Curt Warner: 21 car, 83 yds
- STL – Ottis Anderson: 29 car, 130 yds

Top receivers

- SEA – Steve Largent: 8 rec, 155 yds, 3 TD
- STL – Roy Green: 6 rec, 130 yds, 4 TD

Team – pass – rush – total – to

- SEA – 165 – 84 – 249 – 2
- STL – 231 – 177 – 408 – 2

==== Week 12: at Denver Broncos ====
Week Twelve: Seattle Seahawks at Denver Broncos – Game summary

| Quarter | 1 | 2 | 3 | 4 | Total |
|---|---|---|---|---|---|
| Seahawks | 0 | 7 | 13 | 7 | 27 |
| Broncos | 10 | 10 | 7 | 11 | 38 |

at Mile High Stadium, Denver, Colorado

- Date: November 20
- Game time: 1:00 pm local
- Game weather: clear, 50 °F (10 °C), 36% humidity, wind E 8 miles per hour (13 km/h)
- Game attendance: 74,710
- Referee: Gene Barth
- TV announcers (NBC): Marv Albert and John Brodie
- Gamebook

Game information

First quarter

- DEN – Rich Karlis 42-yard field goal, 12:34 (DEN 3–0)
- DEN – Steve Watson 78-yard pass from Gary Kubiak (Rich Karlis kick), 3:00 (DEN 10–0)

Second quarter

- DEN – Rich Karlis 25-yard field goal, 7:04 (DEN 13–0)
- DEN – Gerald Willhite 24-yard run (Rich Karlis kick), 1:52 (DEN 20–0)
- SEA – Byron Walker 50-yard pass from Dave Krieg (Norm Johnson kick), 0:43 (DEN 20–7)

Third quarter

- DEN – Gary Kubiak 7-yard run (Rich Karlis kick), 10:57 (DEN 27–7)
- SEA – David Hughes 1-yard run (Norm Johnson kick), 5:39 (DEN 27–14)
- SEA – Pete Metzelaars 17-yard pass from Dave Krieg (PAT failed), 1:12 (DEN 27–20)

Fourth quarter

- DEN – Rich Karlis 21-yard field goal, 10:28 (DEN 30–20)
- DEN – Rich Karlis 38-yard field goal, 7:40 (DEN 33–20)
- SEA – Charle Young 11-yard pass from Dave Krieg (Norm Johnson kick), 4:35 (DEN 33–27)
- DEN – Safety, Rulon Jones tackled Dave Krieg in end zone, 1:39 (DEN 35–27)
- DEN – Rich Karlis 40-yard field goal, 1:08 (DEN 38–27)

Top passers

- SEA – Dave Krieg: 31/42, 418 yds, 3 TD, 4 INT
- DEN – Gary Kubiak: 10/18, 165 yds, 1 TD, 1 INT

Top rushers

- SEA – Curt Warner: 20 car, 70 yds
- DEN – Sammy Winder: 20 car, 92 yds

Top receivers

- SEA – Paul Johns: 9 rec, 116 yds
- DEN – Steve Watson: 4 rec, 119 yds, 1 TD

Team – pass – rush – total – to

- SEA – 380 – 94 – 474 – 8
- DEN – 145 – 184 – 329 – 2

==== Week 13: vs. Kansas City Chiefs ====
Week Thirteen: Seattle Seahawks vs. Kansas City Chiefs – Game summary

| Quarter | 1 | 2 | 3 | 4 | OT | Total |
|---|---|---|---|---|---|---|
| Chiefs | 7 | 21 | 7 | 13 | 0 | 48 |
| Seahawks | 7 | 7 | 17 | 17 | 3 | 51 |

at Kingdome, Seattle

- Date: November 27
- Game time: 1:02 pm local
- Game weather: indoors
- Game attendance: 56,793
- Referee: Red Cashion
- TV announcers (NBC): Merle Harmon and Jim Turner
- Gamebook

Game information

First quarter

- KC – Henry Marshall 11-yard pass from Bill Kenney (Nick Lowery kick), 10:39 (KC 7–0)
- SEA – Curt Warner 28-yard run (Norm Johnson kick), 3:23 (Tied 7–7)

Second quarter

- KC – Stephone Paige 17-yard pass from Bill Kenney (Nick Lowery kick), 14:10 (KC 14–7)
- KC – Bill Kenney 1-yard run (Nick Lowery kick), 5:06 (KC 21–7)
- SEA – Byron Walker 18-yard pass from Dave Krieg (Norm Johnson kick), 3:06 (KC 21–14)
- KC – Theotis Brown 13-yard run (Nick Lowery kick), 0:45 (KC 28–14)

Third quarter

- SEA – Dan Doornink 27-yard pass from Dave Krieg (Norm Johnson kick), 12:48 (KC 28–21)
- SEA – Curt Warner 1-yard run (Norm Johnson kick), 10:22 (Tied 28–28)
- SEA – Norm Johnson 42-yard field goal, 6:55 (SEA 31–28)
- KC – Bill Kenney 1-yard run (Nick Lowery kick), 2:34 (KC 35–31)

Fourth quarter

- KC – Carlos Carson 18-yard pass from Bill Kenney (Nick Lowery kick), 11:04 (KC 42–31)
- SEA – Curt Warner 1-yard run (Norm Johnson kick), 7:00 (KC 42–38)
- SEA – Paul Johns 14-yard pass from Dave Krieg (Norm Johnson kick), 2:24 (SEA 45–42)
- KC – Theotis Brown 21-yard pass from Bill Kenney (PAT failed), 1:30 (KC 48–45)
- SEA – Norm Johnson 42-yard field goal, 0:02 (Tied 48–48)

Overtime

- SEA – Norm Johnson 42-yard field goal, 13:14 (SEA 51–48)

Top passers

- KC – Bill Kenney: 21/38, 311 yds, 4 TD
- SEA – Dave Krieg: 16/31, 280 yds, 3 TD, 1 INT

Top rushers

- KC – Theotis Brown: 13 car, 56 yds, 1 TD
- SEA – Curt Warner: 32 car, 207 yds, 3 TD

Top receivers

- KC – Carlos Carson: 7 rec, 149 yds, 1 TD
- SEA – Byron Walker: 4 rec, 75 yds, 1 TD

Team – pass – rush – total – to

- KC – 304 – 127 – 431 – 2
- SEA – 251 – 280 – 531 – 3

==== Week 14: vs. Dallas Cowboys ====
Week Fourteen: Seattle Seahawks vs. Dallas Cowboys – Game summary

| Quarter | 1 | 2 | 3 | 4 | Total |
|---|---|---|---|---|---|
| Cowboys | 7 | 7 | 7 | 14 | 35 |
| Seahawks | 0 | 3 | 0 | 7 | 10 |

at Kingdome, Seattle

- Date: December 4
- Game time: 1:02 pm local
- Game weather: indoors
- Game attendance: 63,352
- Referee: Jim Tunney
- TV announcers (CBS): Frank Glieber and Dick Vermeil
- Gamebook

Game information

First quarter

- DAL – Tony Dorsett 8-yard run (Rafael Septién kick), 4:30 (DAL 7–0)

Second quarter

- DAL – Tony Dorsett 7-yard run (Rafael Septien kick), 3:57 (DAL 14–0)
- SEA – Norm Johnson 54-yard field goal, 0:09 (DAL 14–3)

Third quarter

- DAL – Doug Donley 35-yard pass from Danny White (Rafael Septien kick), 3:09 (DAL 21–3)

Fourth quarter

- DAL – Butch Johnson 16-yard pass from Danny White (Rafael Septien kick), 8:19 (DAL 28–3)
- SEA – Curt Warner 2-yard run (Norm Johnson kick), 4:09 (DAL 28–10)
- DAL – Timmy Newsome 15-yard pass from Gary Hogeboom (Rafael Septien kick), 1:09 (DAL 35–10)

Top passers

- DAL – Danny White: 19/26, 233 yds, 2 TD, 1 INT
- SEA – Dave Krieg: 16/30, 253 yds, 2 INT

Top rushers

- DAL – Tony Dorsett: 26 car, 117 yds, 2 TD
- SEA – Curt Warner: 12 car, 22 yds, 1 TD

Top receivers

- DAL – Butch Johnson: 5 rec, 70 yds, 1 TD
- SEA – Steve Largent: 5 rec, 60 yds

Team – pass – rush – total – to

- DAL – 286 – 132 – 418 – 2
- SEA – 188 – 28 – 216 – 4

==== Week 15: at New York Giants ====
Week Fifteen: Seattle Seahawks at New York Giants – Game summary

| Quarter | 1 | 2 | 3 | 4 | Total |
|---|---|---|---|---|---|
| Seahawks | 7 | 10 | 0 | 0 | 17 |
| Giants | 3 | 3 | 3 | 3 | 12 |

at Giants Stadium, East Rutherford, New Jersey

- Date: December 11
- Game time: 1:00 pm local
- Game weather: cloudy, 38 °F (3 °C), wind E 17 miles per hour (27 km/h)
- Game attendance: 48,945
- Referee: Jerry Markbreit
- TV announcers (NBC): Don Criqui and Gene Washington
- Gamebook

Game information

First quarter

- SEA – Steve Largent 12-yard pass from Dave Krieg (Norm Johnson kick), 10:34 (SEA 7–0)
- NYG – Ali Haji-Sheikh 48-yard field goal, 3:07 (SEA 7–3)

Second quarter

- SEA – Paul Johns 6-yard pass from Dave Krieg (Norm Johnson kick), 9:29 (SEA 14–3)
- NYG – Ali Haji-Sheikh 44-yard field goal, 4:48 (SEA 14–6)
- SEA – Norm Johnson 31-yard field goal, 1:07 (SEA 17–6)

Third quarter

- NYG – Ali Haji-Sheikh 25-yard field goal, 4:37 (SEA 17–9)

Fourth quarter

- NYG – Ali Haji-Sheikh 32-yard field goal, 3:08 (SEA 17–12)

Top passers

- SEA – Dave Krieg: 18/28, 156 yds, 2 TD, 1 INT
- NYG – Jeff Rutledge: 29/52, 349 yds, 2 INT

Top rushers

- SEA – Curt Warner: 26 car, 62 yds
- NYG – Butch Woolfolk: 19 car, 71 yds

Top receivers

- SEA – Charle Young: 2 rec, 32 yds
- NYG – Byron Williams: 7 rec, 103 yds

Team – pass – rush – total – to

- SEA – 127 – 56 – 183 – 1
- NYG – 342 – 98 – 440 – 5

==== Week 16: vs. New England Patriots ====
Week Sixteen: Seattle Seahawks vs. New England Patriots – Game summary

| Quarter | 1 | 2 | 3 | 4 | Total |
|---|---|---|---|---|---|
| Patriots | 0 | 6 | 0 | 0 | 6 |
| Seahawks | 3 | 7 | 7 | 7 | 24 |

at Kingdome, Seattle

- Date: December 18
- Game time: 1:02 pm local
- Game weather: indoors
- Game attendance: 59,688
- Referee: Fred Wyant
- TV announcers (NBC): Charlie Jones and Bob Griese
- Gamebook

Game information

First quarter

- SEA – Norm Johnson 29-yard field goal, 4:21 (SEA 3–0)

Second quarter

- SEA – Steve Largent 46-yard pass from Dave Krieg (Norm Johnson kick), 6:52 (SEA 10–0)
- NE – Derrick Ramsey 33-yard pass from Tony Eason (PAT failed), 1:48 (SEA 10–6)

Third quarter

- SEA – Dan Doornink 16-yard pass from Dave Krieg (Norm Johnson kick), 4:55 (SEA 17–6)

Fourth quarter

- SEA – Dave Krieg 2-yard run (Norm Johnson kick), 8:00 (SEA 24–6)

Top passers

- NE – Tony Eason: 10/22, 104 yds, 1 TD, 1 INT
- SEA – Dave Krieg: 13/21, 230 yds, 2 TD

Top rushers

- NE – Tony Collins: 12 car, 48 yds
- SEA – Curt Warner: 26 car, 116 yds

Top receivers

- NE – Derrick Ramsey: 3 rec, 52 yds, 1 TD
- SEA – Steve Largent: 7 rec, 133 yds, 1 TD

Team – pass – rush – total – to

- NE – 147 – 112 – 259 – 3
- SEA – 198 – 170 – 368 – 0

=== Postseason ===
Seattle entered the postseason as the #4 seed in the AFC.

==== AFC Wild Card Playoff: vs. #5 Denver Broncos ====
AFC Wild Card Playoff: #5 Denver Broncos at #4 Seattle Seahawks – Game summary

| Quarter | 1 | 2 | 3 | 4 | Total |
|---|---|---|---|---|---|
| Broncos | 7 | 0 | 0 | 0 | 7 |
| Seahawks | 7 | 3 | 7 | 14 | 31 |

at Kingdome, Seattle

- Date: December 24
- Game time: 1:04 pm local
- Game weather: indoors
- Game attendance: 60,752
- Referee: Red Cashion
- TV announcers (NBC): Charlie Jones and Bob Griese
- Gamebook

Game information

First quarter

- SEA – Steve Largent 17-yard pass from Dave Krieg (Norm Johnson kick), 10:18 (SEA 7–0)
- DEN – Jesse Myles 13-yard pass from Steve DeBerg (Rich Karlis kick), 3:38 (Tied 7–7)

Second quarter

- SEA – Norm Johnson 37-yard field goal, 9:25 (SEA 10–7)

Third quarter

- SEA – Pete Metzelaars 5-yard pass from Dave Krieg (Norm Johnson kick), 7:58 (SEA 17–7)

Fourth quarter

- SEA – Paul Johns 18-yard pass from Dave Krieg (Norm Johnson kick), 14:56 (SEA 24–7)
- SEA – David Hughes 2-yard run (Norm Johnson kick), 9:34 (SEA 31–7)

Top passers

- DEN – Steve DeBerg: 14/19, 131 yds, 1 TD, 1 INT
- SEA – Dave Krieg: 12/13, 200 yds, 3 TD

Top rushers

- DEN – Sammy Winder: 16 car, 59 yds
- SEA – Curt Warner: 23 car, 99 yds

Top receivers

- DEN – Jesse Myles: 7 rec, 73 yds, 1 TD
- SEA – Steve Largent: 4 rec, 76 yds, 1 TD

Team – pass – rush – total – to

- DEN – 235 – 125 – 360 – 3
- SEA – 179 – 145 – 324 – 0

==== AFC Divisional Playoff: at #2 Miami Dolphins ====
AFC Divisional Playoff: #4 Seattle Seahawks at #2 Miami Dolphins – Game summary

| Quarter | 1 | 2 | 3 | 4 | Total |
|---|---|---|---|---|---|
| Seahawks | 0 | 7 | 7 | 13 | 27 |
| Dolphins | 0 | 13 | 0 | 7 | 20 |

at Orange Bowl, Miami

- Date: December 31
- Game time: 12:30 pm local
- Game weather: rain, 51 °F (11 °C), 84% humidity, wind N 20 miles per hour (32 km/h)
- Game attendance: 71,032
- Referee: Fred Wyant
- TV announcers (NBC): Marv Albert and Bob Trumpy
- Gamebook

Game information

First quarter

- No scoring plays

Second quarter

- MIA – Dan Johnson 19-yard pass from Dan Marino (PAT failed), 12:37 (MIA 6–0)
- SEA – Cullen Bryant 6-yard pass from Dave Krieg (Norm Johnson kick), 9:19 (SEA 7–6)
- MIA – Mark Duper 32-yard pass from Dan Marino (Uwe von Schamann kick), 5:43 (MIA 13–7)

Third quarter

- SEA – Curt Warner 1-yard run (Norm Johnson kick), 6:26 (SEA 14–13)

Fourth quarter

- SEA – Norm Johnson 27-yard field goal, 10:42 (SEA 17–13)
- MIA – Woody Bennett 3-yard run (Uwe von Schamann kick), 3:43 (MIA 20–17)
- SEA – Curt Warner 2-yard run (Norm Johnson kick), 1:48 (SEA 24–20)
- SEA – Norm Johnson 37-yard field goal, 1:15 (SEA 27–20)

Top passers

- SEA – Dave Krieg: 15/28, 192 yds, 1 TD, 1 INT
- MIA – Dan Marino: 15/25, 193 yds, 2 TD, 2 INT

Top rushers

- SEA – Curt Warner: 29 car, 113 yds, 2 TD
- MIA – David Overstreet: 9 car, 50 yds

Top receivers

- SEA – Paul Johns: 4 rec, 60 yds
- MIA – Mark Duper: 9 rec, 117 yds, 1 TD

Team – pass – rush – total – to

- SEA – 183 – 151 – 334 – 1
- MIA – 193 – 128 – 321 – 5

==== AFC Championship Game: at #1 Los Angeles Raiders ====
AFC Championship Game: #4 Seattle Seahawks at #1 Los Angeles Raiders – Game summary

| Quarter | 1 | 2 | 3 | 4 | Total |
|---|---|---|---|---|---|
| Seahawks | 0 | 0 | 7 | 7 | 14 |
| Raiders | 3 | 17 | 7 | 3 | 30 |

at Los Angeles Memorial Coliseum, Los Angeles

- Date: January 8
- Game time: 1:04 pm local
- Game weather: overcast, 66 °F (19 °C), 81% humidity, wind E 5 miles per hour (8.0 km/h)
- Game attendance: 88,734
- Referee: Dick Jorgensen
- TV announcers (NBC): Dick Enberg and Merlin Olsen
- Gamebook

Game information

First quarter

- LA – Chris Bahr 20-yard field goal, 8:47 (LA 3–0)

Second quarter

- LA – Frank Hawkins 1-yard run (Chris Bahr kick), 4:17 (LA 10–0)
- LA – Frank Hawkins 5-yard run (Chris Bahr kick), 1:06 (LA 17–0)
- LA – Chris Bahr 45-yard field goal, 0:03 (LA 20–0)

Third quarter

- LA – Marcus Allen 3-yard pass from Jim Plunkett (Chris Bahr kick), 6:49 (LA 27–0)
- SEA – Dan Doornink 11-yard pass from Jim Zorn (Norm Johnson kick), 4:01 (LA 27–7)

Fourth quarter

- LA – Chris Bahr 35-yard field goal, 3:57 (LA 30–7)
- SEA – Charle Young 9-yard pass from Jim Zorn (Norm Johnson kick), 1:16 (LA 30–14)

Top passers

- SEA – Jim Zorn: 14/27, 134 yds, 2 TD, 2 INT
- LA – Jim Plunkett: 17/24, 214 yds, 1 TD, 2 INT

Top rushers

- SEA – Curt Warner: 11 car, 26 yds
- LA – Marcus Allen: 25 car, 154 yds

Top receivers

- SEA – Paul Johns: 5 rec, 49 yds
- LA – Malcolm Barnwell: 5 rec, 116 yds

Team – pass – rush – total – to

- SEA – 102 – 65 – 167 – 5
- LA – 196 – 205 – 401 – 4
