= Los Angeles Raiders =

Former National Football League franchise in Los Angeles, California (1982–1994)

- Wordmark
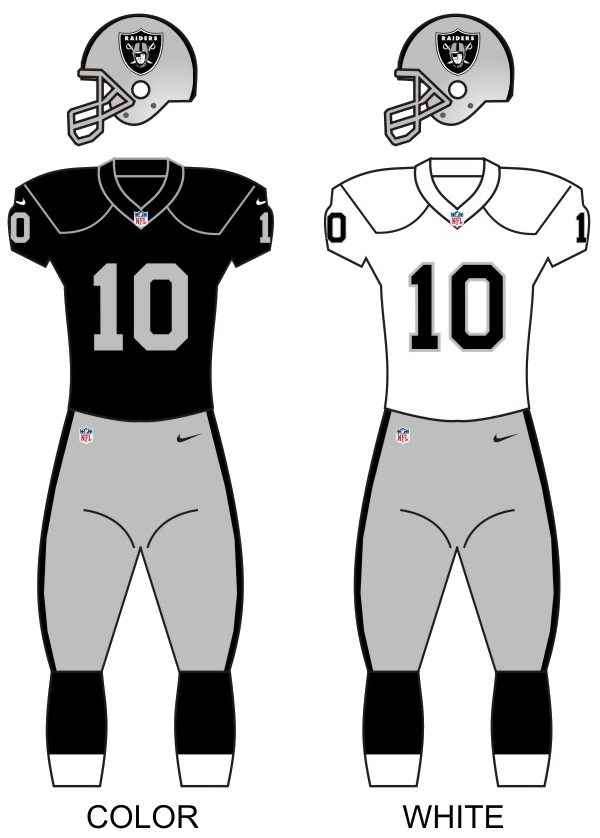
- Uniforms

General information
- Founded: 1982
- Folded: 1994
- Headquartered: Los Angeles, California
- Colors: Silver, black
- Fight song: The Autumn Wind
- Headquartered in El Segundo, California

Personnel
- Owner: Al Davis (1982–1994)
- General manager: Al Davis (1982–1994)
- Head coach: Tom Flores (1982–1987); Mike Shanahan (1988–1989); Art Shell (1989–1994)

Nicknames
- The Silver and Black

Team history
- Oakland Raiders (1960–1981; 1995–2019); Los Angeles Raiders (1982–1994); Las Vegas Raiders (2020–present)

Home fields
- Los Angeles Memorial Coliseum (1982–1994)

League / conference affiliations
- National Football League (1982–1994): American Football Conference (1982–1994); AFC West (1982–1994)

Championships
- Super Bowl championships: 1 1983 (XVIII)
- Conference championships: 1: AFC: 1983
- Division championships: 4: AFC West: 1982, 1983, 1985, 1990

Playoff appearances (7)
- NFL: 1982, 1983, 1984, 1985, 1990, 1991, 1993

The Los Angeles Raiders were a professional American football team of the National Football League (NFL). The Raiders played in Los Angeles from 1982 to 1994 before moving back to Oakland, California, where the team played from its inaugural 1960 season through 1981, and then again from 1995 to 2019.

The team's first home game in Los Angeles was at the Los Angeles Memorial Coliseum on November 22, 1982, after a 57-day player strike. They played their last game as a Los Angeles–based team on December 24, 1994. During their tenure in Los Angeles, the Raiders won four Division titles (AFC West), and one Super Bowl championship: 1983 (XVIII).

After both the Raiders and the Rams left Los Angeles after the 1994 season, Los Angeles was left without an NFL team until the 2016 season when the Rams moved back to the city.

== History ==
=== Start ===
Before the 1980 season, Raiders owner Al Davis attempted unsuccessfully to have luxury boxes added to the Oakland Coliseum. On March 1, 1980, he signed a memorandum of agreement to move the Raiders from Oakland to Los Angeles. The move, which required three-fourths approval by league owners, was defeated 22–0 (with five owners abstaining). When Davis tried to move the team anyway, he was blocked by an injunction. In response, the Raiders not only became an active partner in an antitrust lawsuit filed by the Los Angeles Memorial Coliseum (who had recently lost the Los Angeles Rams to Anaheim), but filed an antitrust lawsuit of their own. After the first case was declared a mistrial, in May 1982 a second jury ruled in favor of Davis and the Los Angeles Coliseum, clearing the way for the move. The Raiders finally moved to Los Angeles for the 1982 season, playing their home games at the Los Angeles Memorial Coliseum.

One major factor for Davis in moving to the Coliseum—despite its flaws as a football stadium—was his assumption that the NFL would eventually approve pay-per-view telecasts for its games; such a move would potentially have given the Raiders a virtual TV monopoly in Los Angeles, the nation's second-largest TV market. Davis also counted on being able to persuade the Los Angeles Coliseum Commission to renovate the facility, particularly by installing scores of luxury boxes. The UCLA Bruins moved their home to the Rose Bowl Stadium in response to the Raiders' arrival.

The Los Angeles teams of the 1980s featured three future Hall of Famers—running back Marcus Allen, defensive lineman Howie Long, and cornerback Mike Haynes—and multisport sensation Bo Jackson, who excelled in both Major League Baseball (MLB) and the NFL as a running back.

=== 1982–1985 ===
In the strike-shortened 1982 season, the team finished first in the AFC with an 8–1 record. They defeated the Cleveland Browns in the first round of the AFC playoffs before losing to the New York Jets in the second round.

In 1983, the Raiders compiled a 12–4 record and a first-place finish in the AFC West. In the playoffs, they convincingly defeated the Pittsburgh Steelers 38–10 in the Divisional Round, and Seattle Seahawks 30–14 in the 1983 AFC Championship Game to advance to Super Bowl XVIII against the Washington Redskins at Tampa Stadium. With seven seconds remaining in the first half, linebacker Jack Squirek intercepted a Joe Theismann swing pass at the Washington five-yard line and scored, sending the Raiders to a 21–3 halftime lead. Los Angeles sealed the game when Hall of Fame running back Marcus Allen reversed his route on a Super Bowl record run that turned into a 74-yard touchdown. The Raiders went on to a 38–9 victory and their third NFL championship. Allen, who was named Super Bowl MVP, set a Super Bowl record for most rushing yards (191) and combined yards (209).

The Raiders had another successful regular season in 1984, finishing 11–5, but a three-game losing streak in late October and early November forced them to enter the playoffs as the second wild card team. They were defeated by the Seahawks in the Wild Card Playoffs, 13–7. The 1985 campaign saw 12 wins and another division title, but the first-seeded Raiders suffered a humiliating 27–20 defeat at the hands of the New England Patriots in the Divisional Playoffs.

=== 1986–1989: Struggles, beginning of the end ===
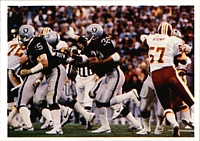
Marcus Allen (center) led the Raiders to a championship in Super Bowl XVIII and earned MVP honors as he rushed for a record of 191 yards, including a memorable 74-yard touchdown run.

The Raiders' fortunes declined after the loss to the Patriots in the 1985 playoffs. From 1986 through 1989, they finished no better than 8–8 and posted consecutive losing seasons for the first time since 1961–62. Also, 1986 saw Al Davis get into a widely publicized argument with running back Marcus Allen, whom he accused of faking injuries. The feud continued into 1987, with Davis retaliating by signing Bo Jackson to take Allen's place. However, Jackson was also a left fielder for Major League Baseball's Kansas City Royals, and could not play full-time until the baseball season ended in October. Even worse, another strike cost the NFL one game and prompted them to use substitute players. The Raiders fill-ins achieved a 1–2 record before the regular roster returned. After a weak 5–10 finish, head coach Tom Flores moved to the front office and was replaced by Denver Broncos offensive coordinator Mike Shanahan. Shanahan coached the team to a 7–9 mark in 1988, and Allen and Jackson continued to trade places as the starting running back. Low game attendance and fan apathy were evident by this point, and in the summer of 1989, rumors of a Raiders return to Oakland intensified when a preseason game against the Houston Oilers was scheduled at Oakland Coliseum.

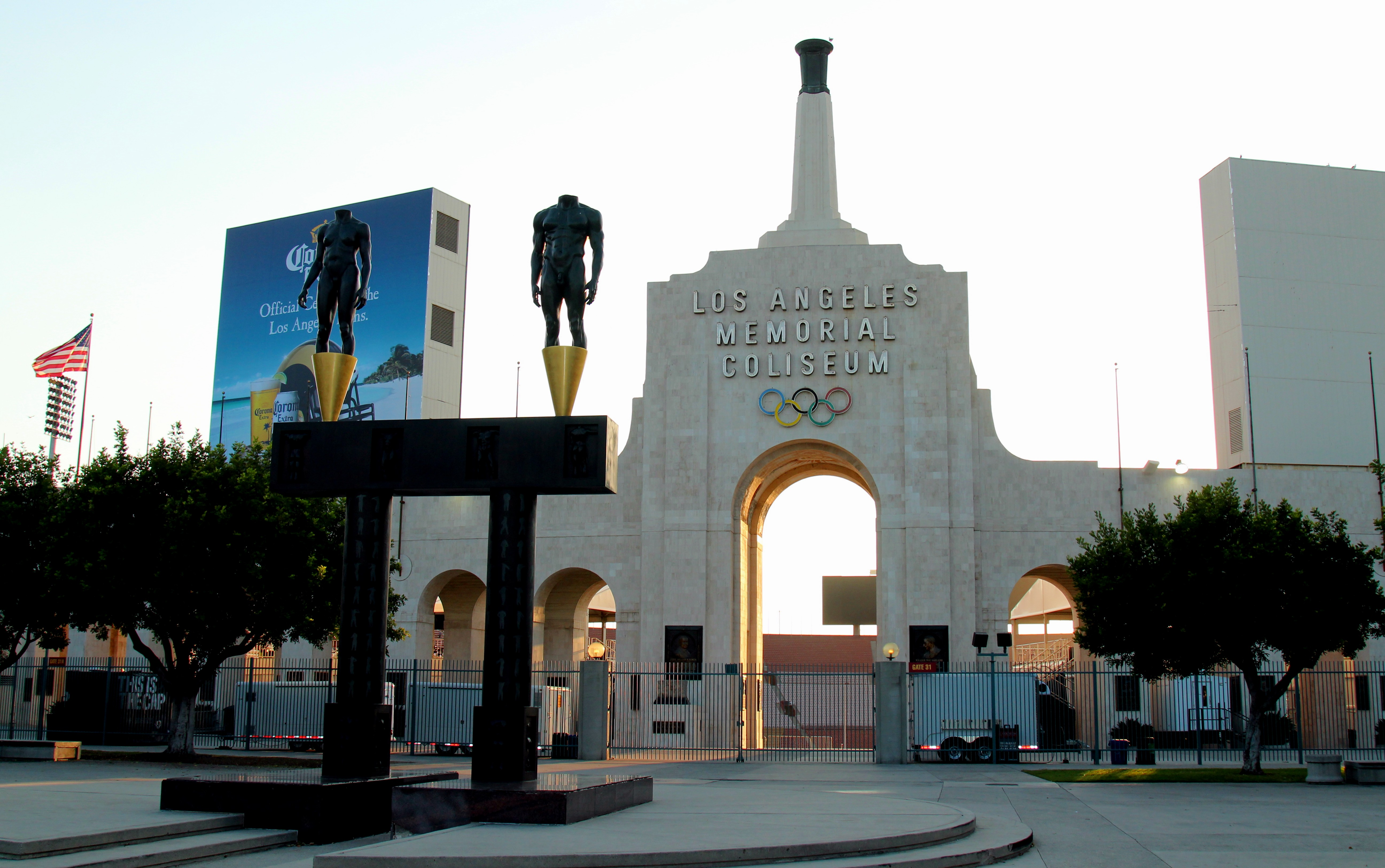
The Raiders played at the Los Angeles Memorial Coliseum from 1982 to 1994

As early as 1986, Davis began to seek a new, more modern stadium away from the Los Angeles Memorial Coliseum and the dangerous neighborhood that surrounded it at the time (which caused the NFL to schedule the Raiders' Monday Night Football appearances as away games). In addition to the team having to share the venue with the USC Trojans, the Coliseum was aging and still lacked the luxury suites and other amenities that Davis was promised when he moved the Raiders to Los Angeles. Finally, the Coliseum had 100,000 seats and was rarely able to fill all of them, and so most Raiders home games were blacked out on television. In August 1987, it was announced that the city of Irwindale, California paid Davis $10 million as a good-faith deposit for a prospective stadium site, though Davis later kept the deposit despite the bid being abandoned by the team. During this time Davis also almost moved the team to Sacramento in a deal that would have included Davis becoming the managing partner of the Sacramento Kings.

=== 1989–1994: Final years ===
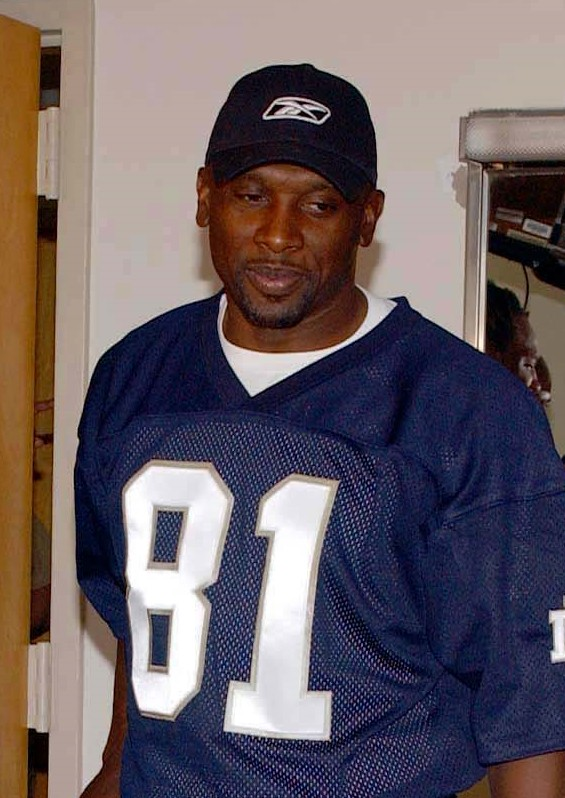
Hall of Fame WR Tim Brown played for the Los Angeles / Oakland Raiders from 1988 to 2003

==== Negotiations with Oakland ====
Negotiations between Davis and Oakland commenced in January 1989, and on March 11, 1990, Davis announced his intention to bring the Raiders back to Oakland. By September 1990, however, numerous delays had prevented the completion. On September 11, Davis announced a new deal to stay in Los Angeles, leading many fans in Oakland to burn Raiders paraphernalia in disgust.

==== New coach ====
After starting the 1989 season with a 1–3 record, Shanahan was fired by Davis, which began a long-standing feud between the two. He was replaced by former Raiders offensive lineman Art Shell, who had been voted into the Pro Football Hall of Fame earlier in the year. With the hiring, Shell became the first African American head coach in the modern NFL era, but the team still finished a middling 8–8. In 1990, Shell led Los Angeles to a 12–4 record. They beat the Cincinnati Bengals in the divisional round of the AFC playoffs, but Bo Jackson had his left femur ripped from the socket after a tackle. Without him, the Raiders were crushed in the AFC Championship by the Buffalo Bills 51–3. Jackson was forced to quit football as a result, although surgery allowed him to continue playing baseball until he retired in 1994.

==== Postseason losses ====
The team's fortunes faded after the loss. They made two other playoff appearances during the 1990s, and finished higher than third place only three times. In 1991, Los Angeles got into the postseason as a wild card after a 9–7 regular season, but fell to Kansas City. 1992 saw the Raiders drop to 7–9. This period was marked by the injury of Jackson in 1991, the failure of troubled quarterback Todd Marinovich, the acrimonious departure of Marcus Allen in 1993, and the retirement of Hall of Fame defensive end Howie Long after the 1993 season, where the Raiders went 10–6 and lost to Buffalo in the divisional round of the playoffs. The Todd Marinovich fiasco overshadowed the Raiders' 1991 and 1992 efforts. Marinovich was groomed from childhood to play football; his strict upbringing led to him being called "Robo QB" in the sports press. He attended USC and was the 24th overall pick in the 1991 draft. However, he struggled on field and was cut after the 1992 season due to repeated substance abuse problems.

Shell's five-plus-year tenure as head coach in Los Angeles was marked particularly by a bitter dispute between star running back Marcus Allen and Al Davis. The exact source of the friction is completely unknown but a contract dispute led Davis to refer to Allen as "a cancer on the team." By the late 1980s, injuries began to reduce Allen's role in the offense. This role was reduced further in 1987, when the Raiders drafted Bo Jackson—even though he originally decided to not play professional football in 1986 (when drafted by the Tampa Bay Buccaneers in the first round). By 1990, Allen had dropped to fourth on the team's depth chart, leading to resentment on the part of his teammates. In late 1992 Allen lashed out publicly at Davis, and accused him of trying to ruin his career. In 1993, Allen left to play for the rival Kansas City Chiefs. Shell was fired after posting a 9–7 record in the 1994 season.

== End ==
In May 1995 after the departure of the Rams for St. Louis, the owners of the National Football League teams approved with a 27–1 vote with two abstentions, a resolution supporting a plan to build a $200 million, privately financed stadium on property owned by Hollywood Park in Inglewood for the Raiders. The stadium would have also been the home of the UCLA Bruins football team, opened in 1997, and been guaranteed at least two Super Bowls. Al Davis balked and refused the deal over a stipulation that he would have had to accept a second NFL team at the stadium as soon as 1998.

The team had also reconsidered the site adjacent to Interstate 210's junction with Interstate 605 in Irwindale, California, 18 miles east of Los Angeles. Originally sought by the Raiders in 1987, plans continuously failed to materialize as the team looked to convert land formerly operated by a quarry as a candidate for a stadium site. City officials in Irwindale offered Davis a $10 million deposit as an incentive to consider the site. Despite a further $10 million being invested by the city into environmental surveys, legal fees, and approvals for usage of the land. For conflicted reasons, Davis accepted the $10 million from the city's bid, but later declined any future proposals for the site.

On June 23, 1995, Davis signed a letter of intent to move the Raiders back to Oakland. The move was approved by the Alameda County Board of Supervisors the next month, as well as by the NFL. The move was greeted with much fanfare, and under new head coach Mike White. Hollywood Park would later become the site of an NFL Stadium for their former rivals, the Los Angeles Rams and a division rival, the Los Angeles Chargers.

== Championships ==
=== Super Bowl championships ===
Season	Coach	Super Bowl	Location	Opponent	Score
1983	Tom Flores	XVIII	Tampa Stadium	Washington Redskins	38–9
Total Super Bowls won: 1					

=== AFC championships ===
Season	Coach	Location	Opponent	Score
1983	Tom Flores	Los Angeles Memorial Coliseum	Seattle Seahawks	30–14
Total AFC Championships won: 1				

== Seasons ==
AFL champions (1960–1969)^{§}	Super Bowl champions (1966–present)^{†}	Conference champions^{*}	Division champions^{+}	Wild Card berth^{#}

Las Vegas Raiders seasonal records
Season	Team	League	Conference	Division	Regular season				Postseason results	Awards	Head coaches	Refs.
Season	Team	League	Conference	Division	Finish	W	L	T	Postseason results	Awards	Head coaches	Refs.
Los Angeles Raiders
1982	1982	NFL	AFC	—	1st	8	1	0	Won First Round playoffs (Browns) 27–10; Lost Second Round playoffs (Jets) 14–17	Marcus Allen (OROY); Lyle Alzado (CBPOY)	Tom Flores	
1983	1983	NFL^{†}	AFC^{*}	West^{^}	1st^{^}	12	4	0	Won Divisional playoffs (Steelers) 38–10; Won AFC Championship (Seahawks) 30–14; Won Super Bowl XVIII (3) (vs. Redskins) 38–9	Marcus Allen (SB MVP)	Tom Flores	
1984	1984	NFL	AFC	West	3rd^{#}	11	5	0	Lost Wild Card playoffs (at Seahawks) 7–13		Tom Flores	
1985	1985	NFL	AFC	West^{^}	1st^{^}	12	4	0	Lost Divisional playoffs (Patriots) 20–27	Marcus Allen (MVP, OPOY)	Tom Flores	
1986	1986	NFL	AFC	West	4th	8	8	0			Tom Flores	
1987	1987	NFL	AFC	West	4th	5	10	0			Tom Flores	
1988	1988	NFL	AFC	West	3rd	7	9	0			Mike Shanahan	
1989	1989	NFL	AFC	West	3rd	8	8	0			Mike Shanahan (1–3); Art Shell (7–5)	
1990	1990	NFL	AFC	West^{^}	1st^{^}	12	4	0	Won Divisional playoffs (Bengals) 20–10; Lost AFC Championship (at Bills) 3–51		Art Shell	
1991	1991	NFL	AFC	West	3rd^{#}	9	7	0	Lost Wild Card playoffs (at Chiefs) 6–10		Art Shell	
1992	1992	NFL	AFC	West	4th	7	9	0			Art Shell	
1993	1993	NFL	AFC	West	2nd^{#}	10	6	0	Won Wild Card playoffs (Broncos) 42–24; Lost Divisional playoffs (at Bills) 23–29		Art Shell	
1994	1994	NFL	AFC	West	3rd	9	7	0			Art Shell	

== Attempted return to Los Angeles ==
On February 19, 2015, the Raiders and the Chargers announced that they would build a privately financed $1.78 billion stadium in Carson, California if they were to move to the Los Angeles market. Both teams stated that they would continue to attempt to get stadiums built in their respective cities.

On April 22, 2015, the Carson City Council bypassed the option to put the stadium to public vote and approved the plan 3–0. The council voted without having clarified several issues, including who would finance the stadium, how the required three-way land swap would be performed, and how it would raise enough revenue if only one team moved in as tenant.

On May 19, 2015, the Chargers and Raiders announced that they had finalized a deal to secure land in Carson which was transferred to a joint powers authority in Carson after the 157-acre site was purchased by Carson Holdings, a company set up by the two teams.

The league was skeptical of the site due to a poorly drawn structure to apply for local bonds to fund the construction; and preferred the Rams' stadium plan on a site at Hollywood Park in Inglewood (which was privately financed), another proposed stadium site rejected by the Raiders in 1995. In response, Jerry Richardson, then owner of the Carolina Panthers, who supported the plan, convinced Chargers owner Dean Spanos to recruit Bob Iger, the then CEO of The Walt Disney Company. Iger was appointed non-executive chairman of the Carson stadium project.

On January 4, 2016, the Raiders filed to move, as had the Chargers and Rams.

Despite the sales pitch from Bob Iger, many owners held reservations about the Carson site, with Jerry Jones even making a wise crack about Bob Iger. The committee set up by the league initially recommended the Carson Site, but the Chargers and Raiders were unable to secure the votes they needed to move. After hours of debate, the NFL owners voted to allow the St. Louis Rams to move back to Los Angeles after a two-decade absence on January 12, 2016, with the San Diego Chargers having the option to join them within a year.

It was still possible, however, for the Raiders to move as they could have moved into the Rams' new stadium in Inglewood with the Rams if the Chargers opted to stay in San Diego. On January 12, 2017, the Chargers opted to join the Rams in Los Angeles, thereby closing the door on the return of the Raiders to the city. Although with an AFC West rival playing in Los Angeles, the Raiders get at least one game in Los Angeles each season playing the Los Angeles Chargers.

== Cultural impact and legacy ==
The Raiders’ time in Los Angeles boosted the team's popularity. Hollywood celebrities, notably the gangsta rap group N.W.A., wore Raiders gear. Chuck D wears Raiders colors on the cover of Public Enemy's It Takes a Nation of Millions to Hold Us Back, despite being a New York Jets fan. "Everyone liked the Raiders," he said, "because they wore black and silver." This period – chronicled by the ESPN 30 for 30 documentary Straight Outta L.A. – is considered the beginnings of Raider Nation.

Today, Southern Californians remain many Raiders fans, two decades after they left. Raiders fans are typically present during their annual matchup against the Chargers as well as games against the Rams at SoFi Stadium. Southern Californian fans are also known to make the 3-hour drive to the team's home games in Las Vegas.

== See also ==
- Oakland Raiders relocation to Las Vegas
- Las Vegas Raiders
- History of the National Football League in Los Angeles
