= Sam Merriman =

American football player (born 1961)

No. 51
- Position: Linebacker

Personal information
- Born: May 5, 1961 (age 65); Tucson, Arizona, U.S.
- Listed height: 6 ft 3 in (1.91 m)
- Listed weight: 229 lb (104 kg)

Career information
- High school: Amphitheater (Tucson)
- College: Idaho
- NFL draft: 1983: 7th round, 177th overall pick

Career history
- Seattle Seahawks (1983–1988)

Career NFL statistics
- Sacks: 2
- Fumble recoveries: 2
- Stats at Pro Football Reference

Sam Merriman (born May 5, 1961) is an American former professional football player who was a linebacker for five seasons in the National Football League (NFL). He played college football for the Idaho Vandals in the Big Sky Conference and was selected in the seventh round of the 1983 NFL draft by the Seattle Seahawks.

== Early life ==
Born and raised in Tucson, Arizona, Merriman graduated from its Amphitheater High School in 1979. He played college football at the University of Idaho in the Big Sky Conference, recruited by head coach Jerry Davitch, a former Arizona Wildcat lineman and high school head coach in Tucson. Merriman had planned on playing at Northern Arizona in Flagstaff, also in the Big Sky, but a coaching change there altered his future further northward.

Merriman was a four-year all-conference starter for the Vandals, but went through a coaching change after a disappointing 3–8 season in 1981, his junior year. He came close to transferring to Hawaii, but decided to stay in Moscow under first-time head coach Dennis Erickson.

In Merriman's senior season in 1982, the Vandals were 8–3 in the regular season and advanced to the second round of the twelve-team Division I-AA playoffs, falling to eventual national champion Eastern Kentucky by eight in a nationally televised game (WTBS) that wasn't decided until the final minute.

Following his senior season, he played in the East–West Shrine Game at Stanford Stadium in mid-January.

== Professional career ==
Merriman was selected by the Seattle Seahawks in the seventh round of the 1983 NFL draft, the 177th overall pick. A reserve linebacker, he made his mark as a standout player on special teams for five seasons. As a rookie in 1983, the Seahawks beat Denver soundly in the wild card game and met favored Miami at the Orange Bowl in the divisional round. It was a close contest with several lead changes; the Seahawks regained the lead 24–20 with under two minutes remaining. On the ensuing kickoff, Merriman recovered a Dolphin fumble inside the Miami thirty that led to a Seattle field goal, the final score of the upset victory.

Entering his sixth season in 1988, Merriman was a likely starter at weak inside linebacker, but suffered a career-ending knee injury in the second preseason game against Detroit at the Pontiac Silverdome; it occurred during a punt return in overtime. Placed on injured reserve, he was released by the team eight months later in April 1989.
