= Mark Hicks (American football) =

American football player (born 1960)

No. 63, 94
- Position: Linebacker

Personal information
- Born: November 7, 1960 (age 66); Los Angeles, California, U.S.
- Listed height: 6 ft 2 in (1.88 m)
- Listed weight: 225 lb (102 kg)

Career information
- High school: George Washington Prep (Westmont, California)
- College: Arizona State
- NFL draft: 1983: undrafted

Career history
- Seattle Seahawks (1983–1984); Detroit Lions (1987)
- Stats at Pro Football Reference

Mark Anthony Hicks (born November 7, 1960) is an American former professional football linebacker who played in the National Football League (NFL) with the Seattle Seahawks and Detroit Lions. He played college football for the Arizona State Sun Devils.

== Early life ==
Mark Anthony Hicks was born on November 7, 1960, in Los Angeles, California. He attended George Washington Preparatory High School in Westmont, California.

== College career ==
Hicks enrolled at Arizona State University to play college football for the Sun Devils. He played for the varsity team in 1979 but not enough to earn a letter. He was a three-year letterman from 1980 to 1982. Hicks received Arizona State's Cecil Abono Captains Award for team morale in both 1981 and 1982. He became a starter as a senior in 1982, earning All-Western Athletic Conference honors.

== Professional career ==
After going undrafted in the 1983 NFL draft, Hicks signed with the Seattle Seahawks on April 28. He was placed on injured reserve on August 29, released on October 5, and re-signed on October 7. He played in ten games, starting one, for the Seahawks during the 1983 season and posted 2.5 sacks. Hicks also appeared in three playoff games, recording one forced fumble. On July 14, 1984, he was placed on the reserve/non-football injury list and missed the entire 1984 season. He was released on August 20, 1985, after the second game of the 1985 preseason.

On September 23, 1987, Hicks was signed by the Detroit Lions during the 1987 NFL players strike. He played in one strike game for the Lions and was released on October 17, 1987, after the strike ended.
