= Paul Moyer (American football) =

American football player and coach (born 1961)

No. 21
- Position: Safety

Personal information
- Born: July 26, 1961 (age 65); Villa Park, California, U.S.
- Listed height: 6 ft 1 in (1.85 m)
- Listed weight: 201 lb (91 kg)

Career information
- High school: Villa Park
- College: Cal State Fullerton; Arizona State
- NFL draft: 1983: undrafted

Career history
- Seattle Seahawks (1983–1989)

Awards and highlights
- Second-team All-Pac-10 (1982); 1983 East-West Shrine All-Star Game MVP

Career NFL statistics
- Interceptions: 11
- Fumble recoveries: 8
- Sacks: 4
- Stats at Pro Football Reference

Paul Stewart Moyer (born July 26, 1961) is an American former professional football player who was a safety for seven seasons with the Seattle Seahawks of the National Football League (NFL) from 1983 to 1989. He played college football for the Arizona State Sun Devils. After his playing career, he coached the Seahawks' secondary from 1990 to 1994. He currently appears as an analyst and occasional host on the Seahawks pregame and postgame shows.

== Playing career ==
As an undrafted rookie out of Arizona State University, Moyer played in all sixteen games with one start in 1983. The only interception return for a touchdown of his career occurred in week 3, from 19 yards out at the Kingdome in a 34–31 victory over the San Diego Chargers. Late in the fourth quarter of Seattle's 1986 game at New England in Sullivan Stadium, Moyer recovered a blocked punt in the end zone for a touchdown to tie the game at 31; the Seahawks' offense found the end zone a minute later for a 38–31 win.

In 1988, Moyer started all sixteen games and led the team with six interceptions. A neck injury ended his career in November 1989, and he served as an assistant coach for the next five years.

Moyer played in 98 NFL games with 30 starts, with career totals of 11 interceptions, eight fumble recoveries, and four sacks.
