= Shelton Robinson =

American football player (born 1960)

No. 57, 51
- Position: Linebacker

Personal information
- Born: September 14, 1960 (age 66); Goldsboro, North Carolina, U.S.
- Listed height: 6 ft 2 in (1.88 m)
- Listed weight: 233 lb (106 kg)

Career information
- High school: Charles B. Aycock (Pikeville, North Carolina)
- College: North Carolina
- NFL draft: 1982: undrafted

Career history
- Seattle Seahawks (1982–1985); Detroit Lions (1986–1988)

Career NFL statistics
- Sacks: 2.5
- Fumble recoveries: 11
- Touchdowns: 2
- Stats at Pro Football Reference

Shelton Derrick Robinson (born September 14, 1960 ) is an American former professional football player who was a linebacker in the National Football League (NFL). He played college football as a tight end and offensive lineman for the North Carolina Tar Heels from 1978 to 1981. He then switched to the linebacker position, playing seven years in the NFL for the Seattle Seahawks (1982–1985) and Detroit Lions (1986–1988). He appeared in 96 NFL games, 51 of them as a starter.
