= Paul Johns (American football) =

American football player (born 1958)

No. 85
- Position: Wide receiver

Personal information
- Born: November 14, 1958 (age 67); Waco, Texas, U.S.
- Listed height: 5 ft 11 in (1.80 m)
- Listed weight: 173 lb (78 kg)

Career information
- High school: S.H. Rider (Wichita Falls, Texas)
- College: Tulsa
- NFL draft: 1981: undrafted

Career history
- Seattle Seahawks (1981–1984)

Career NFL statistics
- Receptions: 74
- Receiving yards: 1,058
- Receiving touchdowns: 7
- Stats at Pro Football Reference

Paul Victor Johns is an American former professional football player who was a wide receiver for four seasons for the Seattle Seahawks of the National Football League (NFL). He played college football for the Tulsa Golden Hurricane.
