= 1979 Oakland Raiders season =

NFL team season

- Owner: Al Davis
- General manager: Al Davis
- Head coach: Tom Flores
- Home stadium: Oakland–Alameda County Coliseum

Results
- Record: 9–7
- Division place: 4th AFC West
- Playoffs: Did not qualify

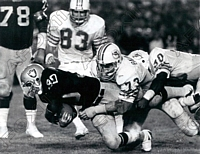
The Raiders hosting the Miami Dolphins at the Coliseum in 1979

The 1979 Oakland Raiders season was their 10th in the league, and 20th overall. They matched their previous season's output of 9–7. Oakland started off 1–3, rallied to 6–4, then fell to 6–6 after an upset loss to the Kansas City chiefs. Oakland then went on a three-game winning streak that featured a 14–10 defensive struggle in Denver, a comeback win in New Orleans after trailing 35–14 in the 3rd quarter, and a 19–14 win over the Cleveland Browns. In the season finale the Raiders stood at 9–6 in need of a win at home against the Seattle Seahawks to have a shot at a wildcard playoff spot. However, it was not to be, as Seattle quarterback Jim Zorn's 314 yards and 2 TD passes eliminated the Raiders, 29–24.

This was the first season since 1964 that the Raiders finished lower than second place in the AFL/AFC West.

== Offseason ==
=== Draft ===
1979 Oakland Raiders draft
Round	Pick	Player	Position	College	Notes
2	42	Willie Jones	DE	Florida State	
6	142	Ira Matthews	RB	Wisconsin	
6	156	Henry Williams	DB	San Diego State	
7	175	Jack Matia	DT	Drake	
8	209	Robert Hawkins	RB	Kentucky	
9	238	Jim Rourke	OT	Boston College	
10	259	Ricky Smith	DB	Tulane	
11	294	Bruce Davis	OT	UCLA	
12	316	Dirk Abernathy	DB	Bowling Green	
12	320	Reggie Kinlaw	DT	Oklahoma	
Made roster † Pro Football Hall of Fame * Made at least one Pro Bowl during career

=== Undrafted free agents ===
1979 undrafted free agents of note
Player	Position	College
Bob North	Quarterback	Michigan Tech

== Personnel ==
=== Staff / Coaches ===
1979 Oakland Raiders staff
Front office: Principal Owner/General Manager - Al Davis; Minority Co-Owner - Eddie McGah; President of the General Partner / General Manager – Al Davis; Director of Football Operations - Steve Ortmayer; Senior Executive – John Herrera; Executive Assistant / Scout - Al LoCasale; Head coaches: Head Coach – Tom Flores; Offensive coaches: Offensive Backs – Ray Willsey; Receivers Coach – Lew Erber; Offensive line – Sam Boghosian; Tight Ends - Bob Mischak; Offensive Assistant - Joe Madro	Defensive coaches: Defensive Line – Ollie Spencer; Linebackers / Assistant Special Teams – Myrel Moore; Defensive Backs – Charlie Sumner; Defensive Backfield Coach - Willie Brown; Special teams coaches: Special Teams Coach – Jim Sweeney; Special Teams Coach - Steve Ortmayer

=== Roster ===
1979 Oakland Raiders roster
Quarterbacks (QB): 11 David Humm; 16 Jim Plunkett; 12 Ken Stabler; Running backs (RB): 46 Todd Christensen; 26 Clarence Hawkins; 31 Derrick Jensen; 43 Ira Matthews; 34 Booker Russell; 30 Mark van Eeghen; 22 Arthur Whittington; Wide receivers (WR): 21 Cliff Branch; 89 Rich Martini; Tight ends (TE): 87 Dave Casper; 88 Raymond Chester; 84 Derrick Ramsey	Offensive linemen (OL): 50 Dave Dalby C; 79 Bruce Davis T; 70 Henry Lawrence T; 65 Mickey Marvin G; 68 Dan Medlin G; 78 Art Shell T; 66 Steve Sylvester G/T; 63 Gene Upshaw G; 75 John Vella T; Defensive linemen (DL): 73 Dave Browning DE; 90 Willie Jones DE; 62 Reggie Kinlaw NT; 72 John Matuszak DE; 74 Dave Pear NT; 77 Charles Philyaw DE; 67 Pat Toomay DE	Linebackers (LB): 56 Jeff Barnes OLB; 83 Ted Hendricks OLB; 57 John Huddleston ILB; 58 Monte Johnson ILB; 53 Rod Martin OLB; 41 Phil Villapiano ILB; Defensive backs (DB): 38 Rufus Bess CB; 36 Mike Davis SS; 37 Lester Hayes CB; 47 Charlie Phillips SS; 32 Jack Tatum FS; 45 Henry Williams CB; Special teams (ST): 5 Jim Breech K; 8 Ray Guy P	Reserve: 81 Morris Bradshaw WR (IR); 82 Larry Brunson WR (IR); 42 Monte Jackson CB (IR); 71 Lindsey Mason T (IR); -- Kerry Parker CB (IR); 35 Terry Robiskie RB (IR); 60 Otis Sistrunk DE (IR); 80 Joe Stewart WR (IR); Rookies in italics

== Schedule ==
Week	Date	Opponent	Result	Record	Venue	Recap
1	September 2	at Los Angeles Rams	**W** 24–17	1–0	Los Angeles Memorial Coliseum	Recap
2	September 9	**at San Diego Chargers**	**L** 10–30	1–1	San Diego Stadium	Recap
3	September 16	**at Seattle Seahawks**	**L** 10–27	1–2	Kingdome	Recap
4	September 23	**at Kansas City Chiefs**	**L** 7–35	1–3	Arrowhead Stadium	Recap
5	September 30	**Denver Broncos**	**W** 27–3	2–3	Oakland–Alameda County Coliseum	Recap
6	October 8	Miami Dolphins	**W** 13–3	3–3	Oakland–Alameda County Coliseum	Recap
7	October 14	Atlanta Falcons	**W** 50–19	4–3	Oakland–Alameda County Coliseum	Recap
8	October 21	at New York Jets	**L** 19–28	4–4	Shea Stadium	Recap
9	October 25	**San Diego Chargers**	**W** 45–22	5–4	Oakland–Alameda County Coliseum	Recap
10	November 4	San Francisco 49ers	**W** 23–10	6–4	Oakland–Alameda County Coliseum	Recap
11	November 11	at Houston Oilers	**L** 17–31	6–5	Astrodome	Recap
12	November 18	**Kansas City Chiefs**	**L** 21–24	6–6	Oakland–Alameda County Coliseum	Recap
13	November 25	**at Denver Broncos**	**W** 14–10	7–6	Mile High Stadium	Recap
14	December 3	at New Orleans Saints	**W** 42–35	8–6	Louisiana Superdome	Recap
15	December 9	Cleveland Browns	**W** 19–14	9–6	Oakland–Alameda County Coliseum	Recap
16	December 16	**Seattle Seahawks**	**L** 24–29	9–7	Oakland–Alameda County Coliseum	Recap
Note: Intra-division opponents are in **bold** text.

== Season summary ==
=== Week 1 ===
Team	1	2	3	4	Total
• Raiders	0	10	14	0	24
Rams	7	10	0	0	17

- Date: September 2
- Location: Los Angeles Memorial Coliseum, Los Angeles
- Game start: 4:00 p.m.
- Game attendance: 59,000
- Game weather: 70 °F (21 °C); wind 10 mph (16 km/h)

Scoring summary
Q1	LA	Tyler 1 yard run (Corral kick)	LA 7–0
Q2	LA	Miller 17-yard pass from Haden (Corral kick)	LA 14–0
Q2	OAK	Breech 38-yard field goal	LA 14–3
Q2	OAK	Ramsey 1 yard pass from Stabler (Breech kick)	LA 14–10
Q2	LA	Corral 46-yard field goal	LA 17–10
Q3	OAK	Chester 27-yard pass from Stabler (Breech kick)	Tie 17–17
Q3	OAK	Chester 4-yard pass from Stabler (Breech kick)	OAK 24–17

=== Week 2 ===
Team	1	2	3	4	Total
Raiders	0	3	7	0	10
• Chargers	14	7	2	7	30

- Date: September 9
- Location: San Diego Stadium
- TV announcers (NBC): Sam Nover and John Brodie

=== Week 3 ===
Team	1	2	3	4	Total
Raiders	0	0	7	3	10
• Seahawks	7	3	10	7	27

- Date: September 16
- Location: Kingdome
- Game weather: Indoors (dome)
- Referee: Gordon McCarter
- TV announcers (NBC): Marv Albert and Mike Haffner

=== Week 4 ===
Team	1	2	3	4	Total
Raiders	0	0	0	7	7
• Chiefs	14	0	7	14	35

- Date: September 23
- Location: Arrowhead Stadium

=== Week 5 ===
Team	1	2	3	4	Total
Broncos	0	3	0	0	3
• Raiders	7	7	0	13	27

- Date: September 30
- Location: Oakland–Alameda County Coliseum, Oakland, California
- Game start: 4:00 p.m.
- Game weather: 64 °F (18 °C); wind 8 mph (13 km/h)
- TV announcers (NBC): Dick Enberg and Merlin Olsen

Scoring summary
Q1	OAK	Casper 28-yard pass from Stabler (Breech kick)	OAK 7–0
Q2	DEN	Turner 19-yard field goal	OAK 7–3
Q2	OAK	van Eeghen 1 yard run (Breech kick)	OAK 14–3
Q4	OAK	Breech 27-yard field goal	OAK 17–3
Q4	OAK	Breech 21-yard field goal	OAK 20–3
Q4	OAK	Johnson recovered fumble in end zone (Breech kick)	OAK 27–3

=== Week 6 ===
Team	1	2	3	4	Total
Dolphins	0	0	3	0	3
• Raiders	0	0	13	0	13

- Date: October 8
- Location: Oakland–Alameda County Coliseum, Oakland, California
- Game start: 9:00 p.m. EST
- Game weather: 63 °F (17 °C); wind 12 mph (19 km/h)
- Referee: Dick Jorgensen
- TV announcers (ABC): Frank Gifford and Don Meredith

Scoring summary
Q3	OAK	Chester 14-yard pass from Stabler (kick failed)	OAK 6–0
Q3	OAK	Hendricks 23-yard interception return (Breech kick)	OAK 13–0
Q3	MIA	von Schamann 23-yard field goal	OAK 13–3

=== Week 7 ===
Team	1	2	3	4	Total
Falcons	0	0	12	7	19
• Raiders	10	9	10	21	50

- Date: October 14
- Location: Oakland–Alameda County Coliseum, Oakland, California
- Game start: 4:00 p.m.
- Game attendance: 52,900
- Game weather: 68 °F (20 °C); wind 9 mph (14 km/h)
- TV announcers (CBS): Pat Summerall, Tom Brookshier and John Madden for the 2nd half

Scoring summary
Q1	OAK	Breech 40-yard field goal	OAK 3–0
Q1	OAK	van Eeghen 1 yard run (Breech kick)	OAK 10–0
Q2	OAK	Breech 30-yard field goal	OAK 13–0
Q2	OAK	Hawkins 20-yard pass from Stabler (kick failed)	OAK 19–0
Q3	OAK	van Eeghen 6-yard run (Breech kick)	OAK 26–0
Q3	ATL	Cain 26-yard pass from Bartkowski (kick failed)	OAK 26–6
Q3	OAK	Breech 47-yard field goal	OAK 29–6
Q3	ATL	Cain 18-yard pass from Bartkowski (kick failed)	OAK 29–12
Q4	OAK	Brunson 8-yard pass from Stabler (Breech kick)	OAK 36–12
Q4	OAK	Hayes 51-yard interception return (Breech kick)	OAK 43–12
Q4	OAK	van Eeghen 1 yard run (Breech kick)	OAK 50–12
Q4	ATL	Cain 3-yard run (Mazzetti kick)	OAK 50–19

=== Week 8 ===
Team	1	2	3	4	Total
Raiders	0	10	3	6	19
• Jets	7	0	7	14	28

- Date: October 21
- Location: Shea Stadium

=== Week 9 ===
Team	1	2	3	4	Total
Chargers	0	6	16	0	22
• Raiders	14	10	7	14	45

- Date: October 25
- Location: Oakland–Alameda County Coliseum, Oakland, California
- Game start: 6:00 p.m. EST
- Game weather: 66 °F (19 °C), wind 17 mph (27 km/h)
- Referee: Ben Dreith
- TV announcers (ABC): Howard Cosell, Frank Gifford and Don Meredith
- Source: Pro-Football-Reference.com

Scoring summary
1	Raiders	Raymond Chester 34-yard pass from Ken Stabler (Jim Breech kick)	Raiders 7–0
1	Raiders	Booker Russell 1-yard run (Jim Breech kick)	Raiders 14–0
2	Raiders	Mark van Eeghen 4-yard run (Jim Breech kick)	Raiders 21–0
2	Chargers	John Jefferson 57-yard pass from Dan Fouts (kick failed)	Raiders 21–6
2	Raiders	Jim Breech 38-yard field goal	Raiders 24–6
3	Chargers	Mike Wood 28-yard field goal	Raiders 24–9
3	Chargers	Dan Fouts 1-yard run (kick failed)	Raiders 24–15
3	Raiders	Ira Matthews 104-yard kickoff return (Jim Breech kick)	Raiders 31–15
3	Chargers	Bob Klein 7-yard pass from Dan Fouts (Mike Wood kick)	Raiders 31–22
4	Raiders	Booker Russell 1-yard run (Jim Breech kick)	Raiders 38–22
4	Raiders	Booker Russell 1-yard run (Jim Breech kick)	Raiders 45–22

=== Week 10 ===
Team	1	2	3	4	Total
49ers	0	10	0	0	10
• Raiders	9	7	7	0	23

- Date: November 4
- Location: Oakland–Alameda County Coliseum, Oakland, California
- Game start: 4:00 p.m.
- Game weather: 59 °F (15 °C); wind 9 mph (14 km/h)
- Referee: Chuck Heberling
- TV announcers (CBS): Bob Costas, Roman Gabriel

Scoring summary
Q1	OAK	Breech 18-yard field goal	OAK 3–0
Q1	OAK	Branch 9-yard pass from Stabler (kick failed)	OAK 9–0
Q2	SF	Wersching 39-yard field goal	OAK 9–3
Q2	SF	Francis 5-yard run (Wersching kick)	SF 10–9
Q2	OAK	van Eeghen 1 yard run (Breech kick)	OAK 16–10
Q3	OAK	Branch 8-yard pass from Stabler (Breech kick)	OAK 23–10

=== Week 11 ===
Team	1	2	3	4	Total
Raiders	7	7	0	3	17
• Oilers	7	7	14	3	31

- Date: November 11
- Location: Astrodome

=== Week 12 ===
Team	1	2	3	4	Total
• Chiefs	7	3	14	0	24
Raiders	0	7	7	7	21

- Date: November 18
- Location: Oakland-Alameda County Coliseum

=== Week 13 ===
Team	1	2	3	4	Total
• Raiders	0	7	7	0	14
Broncos	0	0	0	10	10

- Date: November 25
- Location: Mile High Stadium, Denver, Colorado
- Game start: 4:00 p.m.
- Game weather: 36 °F (2 °C); wind 13 mph (21 km/h)

Scoring summary
Q2	OAK	Casper 3-yard pass from Stabler (Breech kick)	OAK 7–0
Q3	OAK	Russell 1 yard run (Breech kick)	OAK 14–0
Q4	DEN	Turner 30-yard field goal	OAK 14–3
Q4	DEN	Lytle 1 yard run (Turner kick)	OAK 14–10

=== Week 14 ===
Week Fourteen: Oakland Raiders (7–6) at New Orleans Saints (7–6)

Quarter	1	2	3	4	Total
Raiders	7	7	7	21	42
Saints	0	28	7	0	35

at Louisiana Superdome, New Orleans, Louisiana

- Date: December 3, 1979
- Game time: 8:00 p.m.
- Game weather: Indoors (dome)
- Game attendance: 71,323
- Referee: Bob Frederic
- TV announcers (ABC): Frank Gifford, Don Meredith, and Howard Cosell
- Pro-Football-Reference.com

Game information

First quarter

- OAK – Raymond Chester 3-yard pass from Ken Stabler (Jim Breech kick). – Raiders 7–0. Drive: 15 plays, 78 yards.

Second quarter

- NO – Tony Galbreath 2-yard run (Garo Yepremian kick). – Tie 7–7. Drive: 13 plays, 89 yards.
- NO – Tony Galbreath 17-yard pass from Archie Manning (Garo Yepremian kick). – Saints 14–7. Drive: 3 plays, 19 yards.
- NO – Chuck Muncie 1-yard run (Garo Yepremian kick). – Saints 21–7. Drive: 8 plays, 68 yards.
- NO – Henry Childs 28-yard pass from Archie Manning (Garo Yepremian kick). – Saints 28–7. Drive: 1 play, 28 yards.
- OAK – Arthur Whittington 1-yard run (Jim Breech kick). – Saints 28–14. Drive:

Third quarter

- NO – Ken Bordelon 19-yard interception return (Garo Yepremian kick), 6:24. – Saints 35–14.
- OAK – Mark van Eeghen 1-yard run (Jim Breech kick). – Saints 35–21. Drive:

Fourth quarter

- OAK – Derrick Ramsey 17-yard pass from Ken Stabler (Jim Breech kick). – Saints 35–28. Drive:
- OAK – Cliff Branch 66-yard pass from Ken Stabler (Jim Breech kick). – Tie 35–35. Drive:
- OAK – Cliff Branch 8-yard pass from Ken Stabler (Jim Breech kick), 1:54. – Raiders 42–35. Drive: 3 plays, 13 yards.

Top passers

- OAK – Ken Stabler – 26/44, 295 yards, 4 TD, 2 INT
- NO – Archie Manning – 12/23, 154 yards, 2 TD, INT

Top rushers

- OAK – Arthur Whittington – 14 rushes, 67 yards, TD
- NO – Chuck Muncie – 21 rushes, 128 yards, TD

Top receivers

- OAK – Cliff Branch – 7 receptions, 126 yards, 2 TD
- NO – Tony Galbreath – 7 receptions, 106 yards, TD

=== Week 15 ===
Team	1	2	3	4	Total
Browns	0	0	7	7	14
• Raiders	7	6	0	6	19

- Date: December 9
- Location: Oakland–Alameda County Coliseum, Oakland, California
- Game start: 4:00 p.m.
- Game weather: 54 °F (12 °C); wind 6 mph (9.7 km/h)
- TV announcers (NBC): Don Criqui and John Brodie

Scoring summary
Q1	OAK	Branch 39-yard pass from Stabler (Breech kick)	OAK 7–0
Q2	OAK	Breech 25-yard field goal	OAK 10–0
Q2	OAK	Breech 38-yard field goal	OAK 13–0
Q3	CLE	Pruitt 77-yard run (Cockroft kick)	OAK 13–7
Q4	OAK	Breech 23-yard field goal	OAK 16–7
Q4	CLE	Pruitt 2-yard run (Cockroft kick)	OAK 16–14
Q4	OAK	Breech 45-yard field goal	OAK 19–14

=== Week 16 ===
Team	1	2	3	4	Total
• Seahawks	10	7	9	3	29
Raiders	7	10	0	7	24

- Date: December 16
- Location: Oakland-Alameda County Coliseum

=== Standings ===
AFC West
	W	L	T	PCT	DIV	CONF	PF	PA	STK
^{(1)} San Diego Chargers	12	4	0	.750	6–2	9–3	411	246	W2
^{(5)} Denver Broncos	10	6	0	.625	4–4	7–5	289	262	L2
Seattle Seahawks	9	7	0	.563	3–5	6–6	378	372	W2
Oakland Raiders	9	7	0	.563	3–5	5–7	365	337	L1
Kansas City Chiefs	7	9	0	.438	4–4	7–7	238	262	L1
