= 1980 Oakland Raiders season =

NFL team season (won Super Bowl)

- Owner: Al Davis
- General manager: Al Davis
- Head coach: Tom Flores
- Defensive coordinator: Charlie Sumner
- Home stadium: Oakland–Alameda County Coliseum

Results
- Record: 11–5
- Division place: 2nd AFC West
- Playoffs: Won Wild Card Playoffs (vs. Oilers) 27–7; Won Divisional Playoffs (at Browns) 14–12; Won AFC Championship (at Chargers) 34–27; Won Super Bowl XV (vs. Eagles) 27–10

Uniform
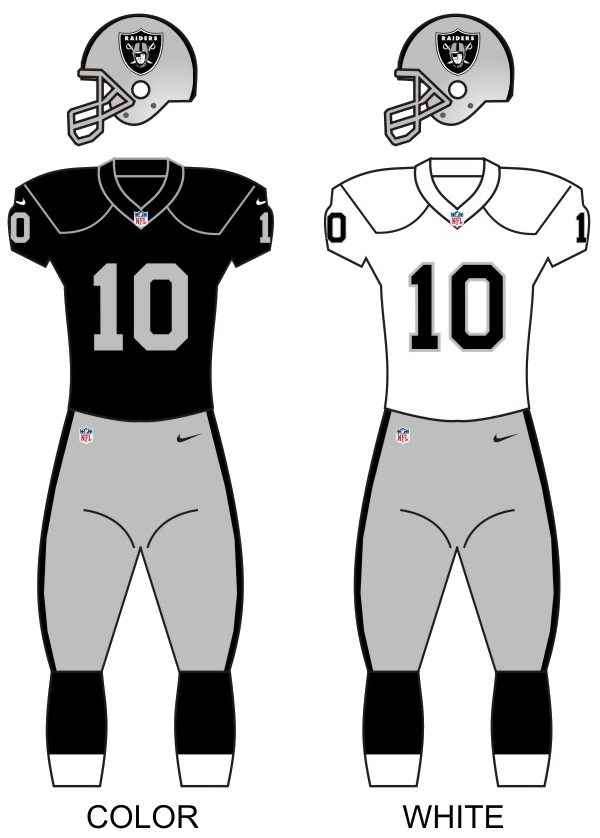

The 1980 season was the Oakland Raiders' 21st since they were founded, their 11th in the National Football League (NFL) and their second under head coach Tom Flores.

The team improved on their 9–7 record from 1979 to an 11–5 record, and ended with their second Super Bowl victory. In 1979, Raiders owner Al Davis announced his intention to move the Raiders to Los Angeles. Negotiations between Davis and the Oakland Coliseum regarding potential improvements to the facility came to an end in February 1980. At the NFL's annual meeting on March 10, 1980, team owners voted 22–0 against allowing the move, with the Raiders not participating and five teams abstaining. Davis announced he would ignore the vote and move the team anyway.

The Raiders played the entire 1980 season in Oakland. At a Monday Night Football game against the Denver Broncos on December 1, 1980, Raiders fans protested by entering the Oakland Coliseum five minutes after the start of the game and holding up signs stating "Save Our Raiders" at each half's 2-minute warning. By some estimates, "almost two-thirds" of the Coliseum's seats had been empty at the game's kickoff.

The announced move was involved in four lawsuits: the Los Angeles Coliseum Commission sued the NFL charging antitrust violations, the NFL sued the Raiders charging breach of contract, Raider season ticket holders filed a class-action lawsuit, and the City of Oakland filed for eminent domain of the team. It would not be the only controversial event the team was involved in, as Lester Hayes’ use of stickum for competitive advantage reached its head during the season, leading to the substance's banning the next season in what was dubbed the “Lester Hayes Rule”. Hayes, along with other NFL players such as Hall of Fame wide receiver Fred Biletnikoff, had used the substance in years past to assist in intercepting, catching and to disrupt opposing quarterbacks' passing ability.

Still playing in Oakland, the Raiders entered the season with a new quarterback after acquiring Dan Pastorini from the Houston Oilers for Ken Stabler. However, Pastorini struggled and the Raiders got off to a 2–3 start before Pastorini was injured and replaced by Jim Plunkett. Plunkett proved right for the Raiders offense. The defense led the league in interceptions (35), turnovers (52) and yards per carry (3.4 YPA). Lester Hayes led the NFL with 13 interceptions. The team won 6 straight games to compile an 11–5 record and qualify for the playoffs as a wild–card team. In the Wild Card round, the Raiders defeated the Houston Oilers 27–7 at Oakland as the Raiders defense picked off Stabler, a former Raiders player himself, twice. Playing in freezing weather with the temperature reading 2 °F (−17 °C), the Raiders stunned the Browns 14–12 in a defensive struggle in Cleveland. In the AFC Championship Game in San Diego, the Raiders upset the Chargers 34–27 in a shootout to become the first AFC Wild Card to make the Super Bowl. Highlighted by Jim Plunkett's MVP performance and Rod Martin's 3 interceptions, the Raiders defeated the Philadelphia Eagles 27–10 in Super Bowl XV, becoming the fifth NFL team to win multiple Super Bowls, joining the Packers, Dolphins, Steelers, and Cowboys. They were also the first wild-card team to ever win the Super Bowl.

== Offseason ==
=== NFL draft ===
1980 Oakland Raiders draft
Round	Pick	Player	Position	College	Notes
1	15	Marc Wilson	Quarterback	BYU	
2	43	Matt Millen *	Linebacker	Penn State	
5	125	Kenny Lewis	Running back	Virginia Tech	
5	126	John Adams	Linebacker	LSU	
5	128	William Bowens	Linebacker	North Alabama	
7	173	Malcolm Barnwell	Wide receiver	Virginia Union	Made roster in 1981.
8	194	Kenny Hill	Defensive back	Yale	Made roster in 1981.
10	264	Walter Carter	Defensive end	Florida State	
11	291	Mike Massey	Linebacker	Arkansas	
12	322	Calvin Muhammad	Wide receiver	Texas Southern	Made roster in 1982.
Made roster * Made at least one Pro Bowl during career

== Personnel ==
=== Staff / Coaches ===
1980 Oakland Raiders staff
Front office: Principal Owner/General Manager - Al Davis; Minority Co-Owner - Eddie McGah; President of the General Partner / General Manager – Al Davis; Director of Football Operations - Steve Ortmayer; Senior Executive – John Herrera; Executive Assistant / Scout - Al LoCasale; Head coaches: Head Coach – Tom Flores; Offensive coaches: Offensive Backs – Ray Willsey; Receivers Coach – Lew Erber; Offensive line – Sam Boghosian; Tight Ends - Bob Mischak; Offensive Assistant - Joe Madro	Defensive coaches: Defensive Coordinator / Linebackers - Charlie Sumner; Defensive Line – Earl Leggett; Defensive Backs – Chet Franklin; Defensive Backfield Coach - Willie Brown; Special teams coaches: Special Teams Coach - Steve Ortmayer; Strength and conditioning: Strength and Conditioning - Bob Mischak

=== Roster ===
1980 Oakland Raiders roster
Quarterbacks (QB): 16 Jim Plunkett; 6 Marc Wilson; Running backs (RB): 31 Derrick Jensen; 33 Kenny King; 43 Ira Matthews; 30 Mark van Eeghen; 22 Arthur Whittington; Wide receivers (WR): 81 Morris Bradshaw; 21 Cliff Branch; 85 Bob Chandler; 89 Rich Martini; Tight ends (TE): 88 Raymond Chester; 46 Todd Christensen; 84 Derrick Ramsey	Offensive linemen (OL): 50 Dave Dalby C; 79 Bruce Davis T; 70 Henry Lawrence T; 65 Mickey Marvin G; 71 Lindsey Mason T; 78 Art Shell T; 66 Steve Sylvester C/G; 63 Gene Upshaw G; Defensive linemen (DL): 73 Dave Browning DE; 77 Joe Campbell DE; 86 Cedrick Hardman DE; 90 Willie Jones DE; 62 Reggie Kinlaw NT; 72 John Matuszak DE; 74 Dave Pear NT	Linebackers (LB): 56 Jeff Barnes OLB; 52 Mario Celotto ILB; 83 Ted Hendricks OLB; 53 Rod Martin OLB; 57 Randy McClanahan ILB; 55 Matt Millen ILB; 51 Bob Nelson ILB; Defensive backs (DB): 36 Mike Davis SS; 37 Lester Hayes CB; 42 Monte Jackson CB; 23 Odis McKinney CB/S; 26 Keith Moody FS; 35 Dwayne O'Steen CB; 44 Burgess Owens FS; Special teams (ST): 10 Chris Bahr K; 8 Ray Guy P	Reserve: -- John Adams LB (IR); 80 Malcolm Barnwell WR (IR); -- Bill Bowens LB (IR); -- Matt Braswell C (Left squad); -- Leo Gray CB (IR); 48 Kenny Hill S (IR); 58 Monte Johnson LB (IR); -- Phil Livingston T (IR); 7 Dan Pastorini QB (IR); 47 Charlie Phillips S (IR); -- Jeff Winans G (IR); Rookies in italics

=== Depth chart ===
Defense
1980 Oakland Raiders roster

FS
Burgess Owens
⋅

WLB	ILB	ILB	SLB
Rod Martin	Randy McClanahan	Matt Millen	⋅
Jeff Barnes	Bob Nelson	⋅	⋅

SS
Mike Davis
⋅

CB
Lester Hayes
⋅

DE	NT	DE
Dave Browning	Reggie Kinlaw	John Matuszak
⋅	⋅	⋅

CB
Monte Jackson
Dwayne O'Steen

Offense
1980 Oakland Raiders roster

WR
Cliff Branch
⋅

LT	LG	C	RG	RT
Art Shell	Gene Upshaw	Dave Dalby	Mickey Marvin	Henry Lawrence
⋅	⋅	⋅	⋅	⋅

TE
Raymond Chester
Dave Casper

WR
Bob Chandler
⋅

QB
Jim Plunkett
Dan Pastorini

RB
Kenny King
⋅

FB
Mark van Eeghen
⋅

Special teams
PK Chris Bahr
P Ray Guy
KR Ira Matthews
PR Ira Matthews

== Staff ==
Head Coach: Tom Flores

Assistants:

- Ray Willsey (RB)
- Lew Erber (WR)
- Sam Boghosian (OL)
- Earl Leggett (DL)
- Charlie Sumner (LB)
- Chet Franklin (DB)
- Steve Ortmayer (ST)
- Bob Mischak (OfA, pro sct)
- Joe Madro (OfA, sct)
- Willie Brown (DfA)

== Season summary ==
Five weeks into the Raiders season, starting QB Dan Pastorini broke his leg in a game against the Kansas City Chiefs. 32-year-old Jim Plunkett came off the bench to relieve Pastorini and had a terrible performance, throwing 5 interceptions in a 31–17 loss. The Raiders, thinking that Marc Wilson did not have the experience they wanted, called on Plunkett to start for the remainder of the year. In his first game as a starter, he completed eleven of fourteen passes with a touchdown and no interceptions, beginning one of the greatest comeback stories in the history of the sport. Plunkett guided Oakland to nine victories in eleven games and a playoff berth as a wild-card. Then, even more remarkably, rather than suffering an early defeat which marks the typical fate of NFL wild card teams, Plunkett led the Raiders to four playoff victories, including the Super Bowl, where they defeated the Philadelphia Eagles, 27–10, in Super Bowl XV. Throwing for 261 yards and three touchdowns, Plunkett was named the game's MVP.

At wide receiver, Cliff Branch re-emerged again as one of the games deep threats and had his best season since 1977. Bob Chandler, the other WR, had one of his best seasons, leading the team in receptions (49) and TDs (10).

All – Pro veteran Raymond Chester at tight end also contributed with timely big plays throughout the year and in the post season. On defense, the Raiders were led by Lester Hayes who arguably had the best season for a cornerback in NFL history – 18 interceptions, 2 TDs in 19 games played. Oakland led the NFL in interceptions (35) and takeaways (52) and 2nd in sacks with 54. Hayes was known for using "stickum" and would have stickum all over his upper body. After the season, the NFL prohibited its use.

The Raiders' Super Bowl win was the first by an NFL wild card team and the second by a non-division champion. The Kansas City Chiefs won Super Bowl IV after finishing second to the Raiders in the AFL West Division during the 1969 season.

== Preseason ==
Week	Date	Opponent	Result	Record	Venue	Recap
1	August 9	at San Francisco 49ers	L 14–33	0–1	Candlestick Park	Recap
2	August 16	New England Patriots	W 31–29	1–1	Oakland–Alameda County Coliseum	Recap
3	August 23	at Washington Redskins	L 17–34	1–2	RFK Stadium	Recap
4	August 30	Philadelphia Eagles	W 24–23	2–2	Oakland–Alameda County Coliseum	Recap

== Regular season ==
=== Schedule ===
Week	Date	Opponent	Result	Record	Venue	Recap
1	September 7	at **Kansas City Chiefs**	**W** 27–14	1–0	Arrowhead Stadium	Recap
2	September 14	at **San Diego Chargers**	**L** 24–30 (OT)	1–1	San Diego Stadium	Recap
3	September 21	Washington Redskins	**W** 24–21	2–1	Oakland–Alameda County Coliseum	Recap
4	September 28	at Buffalo Bills	**L** 7–24	2–2	Rich Stadium	Recap
5	October 5	**Kansas City Chiefs**	**L** 17–31	2–3	Oakland–Alameda County Coliseum	Recap
6	October 12	**San Diego Chargers**	**W** 38–24	3–3	Oakland–Alameda County Coliseum	Recap
7	October 20	at Pittsburgh Steelers	**W** 45–34	4–3	Three Rivers Stadium	Recap
8	October 26	**Seattle Seahawks**	**W** 33–14	5–3	Oakland–Alameda County Coliseum	Recap
9	November 2	Miami Dolphins	**W** 16–10	6–3	Oakland–Alameda County Coliseum	Recap
10	November 9	Cincinnati Bengals	**W** 28–17	7–3	Oakland–Alameda County Coliseum	Recap
11	November 17	at **Seattle Seahawks**	**W** 19–17	8–3	Kingdome	Recap
12	November 23	at Philadelphia Eagles	**L** 7–10	8–4	Veterans Stadium	Recap
13	December 1	**Denver Broncos**	**W** 9–3	9–4	Oakland–Alameda County Coliseum	Recap
14	December 7	Dallas Cowboys	**L** 13–19	9–5	Oakland–Alameda County Coliseum	Recap
15	December 14	at **Denver Broncos**	**W** 24–21	10–5	Mile High Stadium	Recap
16	December 21	at New York Giants	**W** 33–17	11–5	Giants Stadium	Recap
Note: Intra-division opponents are in **bold** text.

=== Standings ===
AFC West
	W	L	T	PCT	DIV	CONF	PF	PA	STK
^{(1)} San Diego Chargers	11	5	0	.688	6–2	9–3	418	327	W2
^{(4)} Oakland Raiders	11	5	0	.688	6–2	9–3	364	306	W2
Kansas City Chiefs	8	8	0	.500	4–4	6–8	319	336	W1
Denver Broncos	8	8	0	.500	3–5	5–7	310	323	W1
Seattle Seahawks	4	12	0	.250	1–7	3–9	291	408	L9

=== Game summaries ===
==== Week 1 at Kansas City Chiefs ====
Week One: Oakland Raiders (0–0) at Kansas City Chiefs (0–0)

Quarter	1	2	3	4	Total
**Raiders**	7	0	14	6	**27**
Chiefs	7	0	0	7	**14**

at Arrowhead Stadium, Kansas City, Missouri

- Date: September 7
- Game time: 4:00 p.m.
- Game weather: 82 °F (28 °C)
- Game attendance: 54,269
- Referee: Pat Haggerty
- TV announcers (NBC): Jay Randolph and Gene Washington
- Box Score

Game information

First quarter

- KC – Ted McKnight 7-yard run (Nick Lowery kick). Chiefs 7–0.
- OAK – Bob Chandler 16-yard pass from Dan Pastorini (Chris Bahr kick). Tie 7–7.

Second quarter

- No scoring

Third quarter

- OAK – Mark van Eeghen 1-yard run (Chris Bahr kick). Raiders 14–7.
- OAK – Bob Chandler 32-yard pass from Dan Pastorini (Chris Bahr kick). Raiders 21–7.

Fourth quarter

- OAK – Chris Bahr 41-yard field goal. Raiders 24–7.
- KC – Tony Samuels 4-yard pass from Steve Fuller (Nick Lowery kick). Raiders 24–14.
- OAK – Chris Bahr 39-yard field goal. Raiders 27–14.

Top passers

- OAK – Dan Pastorini – 19/37, 317 yards, 2 TD
- KC – Steve Fuller – 16/28, 196 yards, TD, 3INT

Top rushers

- OAK – Mark van Eeghen – 16 rushes, 54 yards, TD
- KC – Ted McKnight – 14 rushes, 77 yards, TD

Top receivers

- OAK – Bob Chandler – 5 receptions, 85 yards, 2 TD
- KC – Henry Marshall – 3 receptions, 83 yards

==== Week 2: San Diego Chargers ====
Week Two: Oakland Raiders at San Diego Chargers – Game summary

Quarter	1	2	3	4	OT	Total
Raiders	3	7	7	7	0	**24**
**Chargers**	3	7	0	14	6	**30**

at San Diego Stadium, San Diego

- Date: September 14
- Game time: 1:00 p.m.
- Game weather: 68 °F (20 °C), wind 8 mph (13 km/h)
- Game attendance: 51,943
- Referee: Jim Tunney
- TV announcers (NBC): Dick Enberg and Merlin Olsen
- Box Score

Scoring summary

Quarter	Time	Drive			Team	Scoring information	Score	
Quarter	Time	Plays	Yards	TOP	Team	Scoring information	Raiders	Chargers
1					Chargers	52-yard field goal by Rolf Benirschke	0	3
1					Raiders	35-yard field goal by Chris Bahr	3	3
2					Chargers	John Jefferson 4-yard touchdown reception from Dan Fouts, Rolf Benirschke kick good	3	10
2					Raiders	Cliff Branch 48-yard touchdown reception from Dan Pastorini, Chris Bahr kick good	10	10
3					Raiders	Fumble recovery returned 11 yards for touchdown by Willie Jones, Chris Baher kick good	17	10
4					Chargers	Kellen Winslow 25-yard touchdown reception from Dan Fouts, Rolf Benirschke kick good	17	17
4					Chargers	Clarence Williams 4-yard touchdown run, Rolf Benirschke kick good	17	24
4					Raiders	Raymond Chester 18-yard touchdown reception from Jim Plunkett, Chris Bahr kick good	24	24
OT					Chargers	John Jefferson 24-yard touchdown reception from Dan Fouts, kick not attempted	24	30
"TOP" = time of possession. For other American football terms, see Glossary of American football.							24	30

==== Week 3: vs. Washington Redskins ====
Week Three: Washington Redskins at Oakland Raiders – Game summary

Quarter	1	2	3	4	Total
Redskins	0	7	7	7	**21**
**Raiders**	3	7	7	7	**24**

at Oakland–Alameda County Coliseum, Oakland, California

- Date: September 21
- Game time: 1:00 p.m.
- Game weather: 62 °F (17 °C), wind 8 mph (13 km/h)
- Game attendance: 45,163
- Referee: Jerry Markbreit
- TV announcers (CBS): Vin Scully and George Allen
- Box Score

Scoring summary

Quarter	Time	Drive			Team	Scoring information	Score	
Quarter	Time	Plays	Yards	TOP	Team	Scoring information	Redskins	Raiders
1					Raiders	21-yard field goal by Chris Bahr	0	3
2					Raiders	Dave Casper 20-yard touchdown reception from Dan Pastorini, Chris Bahr kick good	0	10
2					Redskins	Rick Walker 15-yard touchdown reception from Joe Theismann, Mark Moseley kick good	7	10
3					Raiders	Arthur Whittington 42-yard touchdown run, Chris Bahr kick good	7	17
3					Redskins	Joe Theismann 4-yard touchdown run, Mark Moseley kick good	14	17
4					Raiders	Bob Chandler 5-yard touchdown reception from Dan Pastorini, Chris Bahr kick good	14	24
4					Redskins	Ricky Thompson 3-yard touchdown reception from Joe Theismann, Mark Moseley kick good	21	24
"TOP" = time of possession. For other American football terms, see Glossary of American football.							21	24

==== Week 4 at Buffalo Bills ====
Week Four: Oakland Raiders (2–1) at Buffalo Bills (3–0)

Quarter	1	2	3	4	Total
Raiders	0	0	7	0	**7**
**Bills**	7	10	0	7	**24**

at Rich Stadium, Orchard Park, New York

- Date: September 28
- Game time: 1:00 p.m. EDT
- Game weather: 54 °F (12 °C)
- Game attendance: 77,259
- Referee: Dick Jorgensen
- TV announcers (NBC): Don Criqui and John Brodie
- Box Score

Game information

First quarter

- BUF – Curtis Brown 4-yard run (Nick Mike-Mayer kick). Bills 7–0.

Second quarter

- BUF – Joe Cribbs 1-yard run (Nick Mike-Mayer kick). Bills 14–0.
- BUF – Nick Mike-Mayer 30-yard field goal. Bills 17–0.

Third quarter

- OAK – Lester Hayes 48-yard interception return (Chris Bahr kick). Bills 17–7.

Fourth quarter

- BUF – Joe Cribbs 21-yard pass from Joe Ferguson (Nick Mike-Mayer kick). Bills 24–7.

Top passers

- OAK – Dan Pastorini – 10/20, 158 yards, 2 INT
- BUF – Joe Ferguson – 17/22, 175 yards, TD, INT

Top rushers

- OAK – Mark van Eeghen – 10 rushes, 46 yards
- BUF – Joe Cribbs – 30 rushes, 90 yards, TD

Top receivers

- OAK – Bob Chandler – 3 receptions, 87 yards
- BUF – Jerry Butler – 3 receptions, 49 yards

==== Week 5: vs. Kansas City Chiefs ====
Week Five: Kansas City Chiefs at Oakland Raiders – Game summary

Quarter	1	2	3	4	Total
**Chiefs**	14	17	0	0	**31**
Raiders	0	3	0	14	**17**

at Oakland Alameda County Coliseum, Oakland, California

- Date: October 5
- Game time: 1:00 p.m.
- Game weather: 62 °F (17 °C), wind 8 mph (13 km/h)
- Game attendance: 40,153
- Referee: Red Cashion
- TV announcers (NBC): Jay Randolph and Gene Washington
- Box Score

Scoring summary

Quarter	Time	Drive			Team	Scoring information	Score	
Quarter	Time	Plays	Yards	TOP	Team	Scoring information	Chiefs	Raiders
1					Chiefs	Fumble recovery returned 16 yards for touchdown by Gary Spani, Nick Lowery kick good	7	0
1					Chiefs	Ted McKnight 2-yard touchdown run, Nick Lowery kick good	14	0
2					Chiefs	35-yard field goal by Nick Lowery	17	0
2					Chiefs	Arnold Morgado 1-yard touchdown run, Nick Lowery kick good	24	0
2					Chiefs	Fumble recovery returned 32 yards for touchdown by Whitney Paul, Nick Lowery kick good	31	0
2					Raiders	39-yard field goal by Chris Bahr	31	3
4					Raiders	Cliff Branch 10-yard touchdown reception from Jim Plunkett, Chris Bahr kick good	31	10
4					Raiders	Bob Chandler 6-yard touchdown reception from Jim Plunkett, Chris Bahr kick good	31	17
"TOP" = time of possession. For other American football terms, see Glossary of American football.							31	17

==== Week 6: vs. San Diego Chargers ====
Week Six: San Diego Chargers at Oakland Raiders – Game summary

Quarter	1	2	3	4	Total
Chargers	7	3	7	7	**24**
**Raiders**	7	10	7	14	**38**

at Oakland–Alameda County Coliseum, Oakland, California

- Date: October 12
- Game time: 1:00 p.m.
- Game weather: 62 °F (17 °C), wind 8 mph (13 km/h)
- Game attendance: 44,826
- Referee: Ben Dreith
- TV announcers (NBC): Dick Enberg and Merlin Olsen
- Box Score

Scoring summary

Quarter	Time	Drive			Team	Scoring information	Score	
Quarter	Time	Plays	Yards	TOP	Team	Scoring information	Chargers	Raiders
1					Raiders	Kenny King 31-yard touchdown run, Chris Bahr kick good	0	7
1					Chargers	John Cappelletti 5-yard touchdown run, Rolf Benirschke kick good	7	7
2					Raiders	42-yard field goal by Chris Bahr	7	10
2					Chargers	25-yard field goal by Rolf Benirschke	10	10
2					Raiders	Cliff Branch 43-yard touchdown reception from Jim Plunkett, Chris Bahr kick good	10	17
3					Raiders	Mark van Eeghen 3-yard touchdown run, Chris Bahr kick good	10	24
3					Chargers	John Jefferson 25-yard touchdown reception from Dan Fouts, Rolf Benirschke kick good	17	24
4					Chargers	Dan Fouts 1-yard touchdown run, Rolf Benirschke kick good	24	24
4					Raiders	Kenny King 89-yard touchdown run, Chris Bahr kick good	24	31
4					Raiders	Fumble recovered in end zone by Todd Christensen for touchdown, Chris Bahr kick good	24	38
"TOP" = time of possession. For other American football terms, see Glossary of American football.							24	38

==== Week 7: at Pittsburgh Steelers ====
Week Seven: Oakland Raiders at Pittsburgh Steelers – Game summary

Quarter	1	2	3	4	Total
**Raiders**	7	21	7	10	**45**
Steelers	10	14	10	0	**34**

at Three Rivers Stadium, Pittsburgh, Pennsylvania

- Date: October 20
- Game time: 6:00 p.m.
- Game weather: 42 °F (6 °C), wind 12 mph (19 km/h)
- Game attendance: 53,940
- Referee: Pat Haggerty
- TV announcers (ABC): Frank Gifford, Howard Cosell, Don Meredith
- Box Score

Scoring summary

Quarter	Time	Drive			Team	Scoring information	Score	
Quarter	Time	Plays	Yards	TOP	Team	Scoring information	Raiders	Steelers
1		6	67	3:01	Steelers	Jim Smith 19-yard touchdown reception from Terry Bradshaw, Matt Bahr kick good	0	7
1					Steelers	18-yard field goal by Matt Bahr	0	10
1		6	85	2;05	Raiders	Kenny King 27-yard touchdown run, Chris Bahr kick good	7	10
2		10	84	5:28	Steelers	Greg Hawthorne 1-yard touchdown run, Matt Bahr kick good	7	17
2		7	39	2:52	Raiders	Mark van Eeghen 1-yard touchdown run, Chris Bahr kick good	14	17
2					Raiders	Fumble recovery returned 34 yards for touchdown by Rod Martin, Chris Bahr kick good	21	17
2					Raiders	Morris Bradshaw 45-yard touchdown reception from Jim Plunkett, Chris Bahr kick good	28	17
2					Steelers	Jim Smith 13-yard touchdown reception from Cliff Stoudt, Chris Bahr kick good	28	24
3					Raiders	Cliff Branch 56-yard touchdown reception from Jim Plunkett, Chris Bahr kick good	35	24
3					Steelers	Theo Bell 36-yard touchdown reception from Terry Bradshaw, Matt Bahr kick good	35	31
3					Steelers	32-yard field goal by Matt Bahr	35	34
4					Raiders	Cliff Branch 34-yard touchdown reception from Jim Plunkett, Chris Bahr kick good	42	34
4					Raiders	36-yard field goal by Chris Bahr	45	34
"TOP" = time of possession. For other American football terms, see Glossary of American football.							45	34

==== Week 8: vs. Seattle Seahawks ====
Week Eight: Seattle Seahawks at Oakland Raiders – Game summary

Quarter	1	2	3	4	Total
Seahawks	0	0	0	14	**14**
**Raiders**	3	3	10	17	**33**

at Oakland–Alameda County Coliseum, Oakland, California

- Date: October 26
- Game time: 1:00 p.m.
- Game weather: 57 °F (14 °C), wind 7 mph (11 km/h)
- Game attendance: 50,185
- Referee: Cal Lepore
- TV announcers (NBC): Sam Nover and Bob Trumpy
- Box Score

Scoring summary

Quarter	Time	Drive			Team	Scoring information	Score	
Quarter	Time	Plays	Yards	TOP	Team	Scoring information	Seahawks	Raiders
1					Raiders	34-yard field goal by Chris Bahr	0	3
2					Raiders	38-yard field goal by Chris Bahr	0	6
3					Raiders	30-yard field goal by Chris Bahr	0	9
3					Raiders	Bob Chandler 5-yard touchdown reception from Jim Plunkett, Chris Bahr kick good	0	16
4					Raiders	Bob Chandler 12-yard touchdown reception from Jim Plunkett, Chris Bahr kick good	0	23
4					Seahawks	Lawrence McCutcheon 1-yard touchdown run, Efren Herrera kick good	7	23
4					Raiders	Bob Chandler 23-yard touchdown reception from Jim Plunkett, Chris Bahr kick good	7	30
4					Seahawks	Steve Largent 67-yard touchdown reception from Jim Zorn, Efren Herrera kick good	14	30
4					Raiders	25-yard field goal by Chris Bahr	14	33
"TOP" = time of possession. For other American football terms, see Glossary of American football.							14	33

==== Week 9: vs. Miami Dolphins ====
Week Nine: Miami Dolphins at Oakland Raiders – Game summary

Quarter	1	2	3	4	Total
Dolphins	0	3	7	0	**10**
**Raiders**	6	10	0	0	**16**

at Oakland–Alameda County Coliseum, Oakland, California

- Date: November 2
- Game time: 1:00 p.m.
- Game weather: 58 °F (14 °C), wind 6 mph (9.7 km/h)
- Game attendance: 46,378
- Referee: Bob McElwee
- TV announcers (NBC): Don Criqui and John Brodie
- Box Score

Scoring summary

Quarter	Time	Drive			Team	Scoring information	Score	
Quarter	Time	Plays	Yards	TOP	Team	Scoring information	Dolphins	Raiders
1					Raiders	Raymond Chester 13-yard touchdown reception from Jim Plunkett, Chris Bahr kick no good	0	6
2					Dolphins	35-yard field goal by Uwe von Schamann	3	6
2					Raiders	48-yard field goal by Chris Bahr	3	9
2					Raiders	Bob Chandler 17-yard touchdown reception from Jim Plunkett, Chris Bahr kick good	3	16
3					Dolphins	Terry Robiskie 2-yard touchdown run, Uwe von Schamann kick good	10	16
"TOP" = time of possession. For other American football terms, see Glossary of American football.							10	16

==== Week 10: vs. Cincinnati Bengals ====
Week Ten: Cincinnati Bengals at Oakland Raiders – Game summary

Quarter	1	2	3	4	Total
Bengals	3	7	0	7	**17**
**Raiders**	0	14	7	7	**28**

at Oakland–Alameda County Coliseum, Oakland, California

- Date: November 9
- Game time: 1:00 p.m.
- Game weather: 57 °F (14 °C), wind 5 mph (8.0 km/h)
- Game attendance: 44,132
- Referee: Gene Barth
- TV announcers (NBC): Bob Costas and Gene Washington
- Box Score

Scoring summary

Quarter	Time	Drive			Team	Scoring information	Score	
Quarter	Time	Plays	Yards	TOP	Team	Scoring information	Bengals	Raiders
1					Bengals	29-yard field goal by Ian Sunter	3	0
2					Raiders	Mark van Eeghen 2-yard touchdown run, Chris Bahr kick good	3	7
2					Bengals	Dan Ross 1-yard touchdown reception from Ken Anderson, Ian Sunter kick good	10	7
2					Raiders	Kenny King 8-yard touchdown run, Chris Bahr kick good	10	14
3					Raiders	Kickoff returned 90 yards for touchdown by Arthur Whittington, Chris Bahr kick good	10	21
4					Bengals	Don Bass 20-yard touchdown reception from Jack Thompson, Ian Sunter kick good	17	21
4					Raiders	Jim Plunkett 4-yard touchdown run, Chris Bahr kick good	17	28
"TOP" = time of possession. For other American football terms, see Glossary of American football.							17	28

==== Week 11: at Seattle Seahawks ====
Week Eleven: Oakland Raiders at Seattle Seahawks – Game summary

Quarter	1	2	3	4	Total
**Raiders**	0	0	7	12	**19**
Seahawks	0	7	7	3	**17**

at The Kingdome, Seattle, Washington

- Date: November 17
- Game time: 6:00 p.m.
- Game weather: indoors
- Game attendance: 60,480
- Referee: Fred Silva
- TV announcers (ABC): Frank Gifford, Howard Cosell, and Don Meredith
- Box Score

Scoring summary

Quarter	Time	Drive			Team	Scoring information	Score	
Quarter	Time	Plays	Yards	TOP	Team	Scoring information	Raiders	Seahawks
2					Seahawks	Lawrence McCutcheon 1-yard touchdown run, Efren Herrera kick good	0	7
3					Seahawks	Dan Doornink 8-yard touchdown reception from Jim Zorn, Efren Herrera kick good	0	14
3					Raiders	Arthur Whittington 10-yard touchdown run, Chris Bahr kick good	7	14
4					Seahawks	37-yard field goal by Efren Herrera	7	17
4					Raiders	Ted Hendricks blocked punt through end zone	9	17
4					Raiders	Mark van Eeghen 1-yard touchdown run, Chris Bahr kick good	16	17
4					Raiders	28-yard field goal by Chris Bahr	19	17
"TOP" = time of possession. For other American football terms, see Glossary of American football.							19	17

==== Week 12: at Philadelphia Eagles ====
Week Twelve: Oakland Raiders at Philadelphia Eagles – Game summary

Quarter	1	2	3	4	Total
Raiders	0	0	0	7	**7**
**Eagles**	0	0	3	7	**10**

at Veterans Stadium, Philadelphia

- Date: November 23
- Game time: 10:00 a.m.
- Game weather: 37 °F (3 °C), wind 5 mph (8.0 km/h)
- Game attendance: 68,535
- Referee: Jim Tunney
- TV announcers (NBC): Dick Enberg and Bob Trumpy
- Box Score

Scoring summary

Quarter	Time	Drive			Team	Scoring information	Score	
Quarter	Time	Plays	Yards	TOP	Team	Scoring information	Raiders	Eagles
3					Eagles	51-yard field goal by Tony Franklin	0	3
4					Raiders	Cliff Branch 86-yard touchdown reception from Jim Plunkett, Chris Bahr kick good	7	3
4					Eagles	Wilbert Montgomery 3-yard touchdown run, Tony Franklin kick good	7	10
"TOP" = time of possession. For other American football terms, see Glossary of American football.							7	10

==== Week 13: vs. Denver Broncos ====
Week Thirteen: Denver Broncos at Oakland Raiders – Game summary

Quarter	1	2	3	4	Total
Broncos	3	0	0	0	**3**
**Raiders**	0	0	6	3	**9**

at Oakland–Alameda County Coliseum, Oakland, California

- Date: December 1
- Game time: 6:00 p.m.
- Game weather: 51 °F (11 °C), wind 6 mph (9.7 km/h)
- Game attendance: 51,583
- Referee: Red Cashion
- TV announcers (ABC): Frank Gifford, Howard Cosell, and Don Meredith
- Box Score

Scoring summary

Quarter	Time	Drive			Team	Scoring information	Score	
Quarter	Time	Plays	Yards	TOP	Team	Scoring information	Broncos	Raiders
1					Broncos	41-yard field goal by Fred Steinfort	3	0
3					Raiders	Jim Plunkett 8-yard touchdown run, Chris Bahr kick no good	3	6
4					Raiders	44-yard field goal by Chris Bahr	3	9
"TOP" = time of possession. For other American football terms, see Glossary of American football.							3	9

==== Week 14: vs. Dallas Cowboys ====
Week Fourteen: Dallas Cowboys at Oakland Raiders – Game summary

Quarter	1	2	3	4	Total
**Cowboys**	7	9	3	0	**19**
Raiders	7	3	3	0	**13**

at Oakland–Alameda County Coliseum, Oakland, California

- Date: December 7
- Game time: 1:00 p.m.
- Game weather: 48 °F (9 °C), wind 8 mph (13 km/h)
- Game attendance: 53,194
- Referee: Jerry Markbreit
- TV announcers (CBS): Pat Summerall and Tom Brookshier
- Box Score

Dallas cornerback Aaron Mitchell intercepted Jim Plunkett in the end zone with 1:44 remaining to seal the victory.

Scoring summary

Quarter	Time	Drive			Team	Scoring information	Score	
Quarter	Time	Plays	Yards	TOP	Team	Scoring information	Cowboys	Raiders
1					Raiders	Raymond Chester 6-yard touchdown reception from Jim Plunkett, Chris Bahr kick good	0	7
1					Cowboys	Tony Dorsett 20-yard touchdown run, Rafael Septién kick good	7	7
2					Cowboys	52-yard field goal by Rafael Septien	10	7
2					Cowboys	Ron Springs 2-yard touchdown run, Rafael Septien kick no good	16	7
2					Raiders	22-yard field goal by Chris Bahr	16	10
3					Cowboys	34-yard field goal by Rafael Septein	19	10
3					Raiders	38-yard field goal by Chris Bahr	19	13
"TOP" = time of possession. For other American football terms, see Glossary of American football.							19	13

==== Week 15: at Denver Broncos ====
Week Fifteen: Oakland Raiders at Denver Broncos – Game summary

Quarter	1	2	3	4	Total
**Raiders**	7	10	0	7	**24**
Broncos	0	7	7	7	**21**

at Mile High Stadium, Denver, Colorado

- Date: December 14
- Game time: 1:00 p.m.
- Game weather: 41 °F (5 °C), wind 9 mph (14 km/h)
- Game attendance: 73,974
- Referee: Dick Jorgensen
- TV announcers (NBC): Don Criqui and John Brodie
- Box Score

Scoring summary

Quarter	Time	Drive			Team	Scoring information	Score	
Quarter	Time	Plays	Yards	TOP	Team	Scoring information	Raiders	Broncos
1					Raiders	Interception returned 58 yards for touchdown by Burgess Owens, Chris Bahr kick good	7	0
2					Broncos	Dave Preston 2-yard touchdown run, Fred Steinfort kick good	7	7
2					Raiders	44-yard field goal by Chris Bahr	10	7
2					Raiders	Bob Chandler 11-yard touchdown reception from Jim Plunkett, Chris Bahr kick good	17	7
3					Broncos	Riley Odoms 12-yard touchdown reception from Craig Morton, Fred Steinfort kick good	17	14
4					Raiders	Bob Chandler 38-yard touchdown reception from Jim Plunkett, Chris Bahr kick good	24	14
4					Broncos	Dave Preston 9-yard touchdown run, Fred Steinfort kick good	24	21
"TOP" = time of possession. For other American football terms, see Glossary of American football.							24	21

==== Week 16: at New York Giants ====
Week Sixteen: Oakland Raiders at New York Giants – Game summary

Quarter	1	2	3	4	Total
**Raiders**	10	10	7	6	**33**
Giants	0	10	0	7	**17**

at Giants Stadium, East Rutherford, New Jersey

- Date: December 21
- Game time: 10:00 a.m.
- Game weather: 19 °F (−7 °C), wind 16 mph (26 km/h)
- Game attendance: 61,287
- Referee: Jerry Seeman
- TV announcers (NBC): Charlie Jones and Len Dawson
- Box Score

The Raiders clinched a wild card spot and a home playoff game with the win over the Giants. Oakland was now 9–2 since Jim Plunkett had taken over as the team's starting quarterback. "I'm not really amazed", Plunkett said. "I felt that this team had a chance to make it into the playoffs. I'm just thankful I had these opportunities to play. I just kept plugging away and I think it turned out OK."

Chris Bahr opened scoring midway through the first quarter with a 41-yard field goal. Ted Hendricks blocked Dave Jennings' punt and Jeff Barnes fell on the ball at the New York 11 on the ensuing possession. Two plays later, Arthur Whittington swept around right end for Oakland's first score.

Three plays into the Giants' next drive, Gary Shirk caught a Scott Brunner pass but fumbled it away. Luckily, the Raiders couldn't capitalize as Bahr's 52-yard field goal attempt was short.

A Joe Danelo field goal put New York on the scoreboard but Plunkett completed passes of 12 and 11 yards to Bob Chandler before finding Cliff Branch caught a pass between Eric Felton and Steve Henry at the Giants' 10 and strode in to give Oakland a 17–3 lead with 6:29 left in the first half. Three plays following the kickoff, Lester Hayes picked off Brunner and returned it 50 yards to the New York 19. The Raiders failed to move and Bahr kicked a 38-yard field goal to increase the lead to 20–3 with 2:55 left.

New York scored their first touchdown on a touchdown pass from Scott Brunner to Leon Perry before halftime but Oakland took control on a 37-yard bomb from Plunkett to Raymond Chester late in the third quarter. Billy Taylor scored in the closing seconds following a pass interference penalty by Hayes in the end zone but an onside kick attempt by Joe Danelo went right to Derrick Jensen, who sprinted into the end zone.

Scoring summary

Quarter	Time	Drive			Team	Scoring information	Score	
Quarter	Time	Plays	Yards	TOP	Team	Scoring information	Raiders	Giants
1					Raiders	41-yard field goal by Chris Bahr	3	0
1		2			Raiders	Arthur Whittington 7-yard touchdown run, Chris Bahr kick good	10	0
2	11:26				Giants	47-yard field goal by Joe Danelo	10	3
2	6:29		79		Raiders	Cliff Branch 31-yard touchdown reception from Jim Plunkett, Chris Bahr kick good	17	3
2	2:52				Raiders	38-yard field goal by Chris Bahr	20	3
2	0:45				Giants	Leon Perry 11-yard touchdown reception from Scott Brunner, Joe Danelo kick good	20	10
3	2:55				Raiders	Raymond Chester 37-yard touchdown reception from Jim Plunkett, Chris Bahr kick good	27	10
4	0:22				Giants	Billy Taylor 1-yard touchdown run, Joe Danelo kick good	27	17
4	0:16				Raiders	Kickoff returned 33 yards for touchdown by Derrick Jensen, Chris Bahr kick no good	33	17
"TOP" = time of possession. For other American football terms, see Glossary of American football.							33	17

== Playoffs ==
Round	Date	Opponent (Seed)	Result	Record	Venue	Recap
Wild Card	December 28	Houston Oilers (5)	W 27–7	1–0	Oakland–Alameda County Coliseum	Recap
Divisional	January 4	at Cleveland Browns (2)	W 14–12	2–0	Cleveland Stadium	Recap
Conference	January 11	at San Diego Chargers (1)	W 34–27	3–0	San Diego Stadium	Recap
Super Bowl XV	January 25	Philadelphia Eagles (N2)	W 27–10	4–0	Louisiana Superdome	Recap

=== Game summaries ===
==== Wild card ====
Wild Card: Houston Oilers at Oakland Raiders – Game summary

Quarter	1	2	3	4	Total
Oilers	7	0	0	0	7
Raiders	3	7	0	17	27

at Oakland–Alameda County Coliseum, Oakland, California

- Date: December 28
- Game time: 2:00 p.m.
- Game weather: 51 °F (11 °C), wind 5 mph (8.0 km/h)
- Game attendance: 52,762
- Referee: Chuck Heberling
- TV announcers (NBC): Charlie Jones and Len Dawson
- Box Score

Scoring summary

Quarter	Time	Drive			Team	Scoring information	Score	
Quarter	Time	Plays	Yards	TOP	Team	Scoring information	Oilers	Raiders
1					Raiders	47-yard field goal by Chris Bahr	0	3
1					Oilers	Earl Campbell 10-yard touchdown run, Toni Fritsch kick good	7	3
2					Raiders	Todd Christensen 1-yard touchdown reception from Jim Plunkett, Chris Bahr kick good	7	10
4					Raiders	Arthur Whittington 44-yard touchdown reception from Jim Plunkett, Chris Bahr kick good	7	17
4					Raiders	37-yard field goal by Chris Bahr	7	20
4					Raiders	Interception returned 20 yards for touchdown by Lester Hayes, Chris Bahr kick good	7	27
"TOP" = time of possession. For other American football terms, see Glossary of American football.							7	27

==== Divisional ====
Divisional Round: Oakland Raiders at Cleveland Browns – Game summary

Quarter	1	2	3	4	Total
Raiders	0	7	0	7	14
Browns	0	6	6	0	12

at Cleveland Municipal Stadium, Cleveland, Ohio

- Date: January 4
- Game time: 12:30 p.m.
- Game weather: 2 °F (−17 °C), wind 21 mph (34 km/h)
- Game attendance: 77,655
- Referee: Ben Dreith
- TV announcers (NBC): Don Criqui and John Brodie
- Box Score

Scoring summary

Quarter	Time	Drive			Team	Scoring information	Score	
Quarter	Time	Plays	Yards	TOP	Team	Scoring information	Raiders	Browns
2					Browns	Interception returned 42 yards for touchdown by Ron Bolton, Don Cockroft kick no good	0	6
2					Raiders	Mark van Eeghen 1-yard touchdown run, Chris Bahr kick good	7	6
3					Browns	30-yard field goal by Don Cockroft	7	9
3					Browns	30-yard field goal by Don Cockroft	7	12
4					Raiders	Mark van Eeghen 1-yard touchdown run, Chris Bahr kick good	14	12
"TOP" = time of possession. For other American football terms, see Glossary of American football.							14	12

==== AFC Championship ====
AFC Championship Game: Oakland Raiders at San Diego Chargers – Game summary

Quarter	1	2	3	4	Total
Raiders	21	7	3	3	34
Chargers	7	7	10	3	27

at San Diego Stadium, San Diego

- Date: January 11
- Game time: 2:00 p.m.
- Game weather: 67 °F (19 °C), wind 8 mph (13 km/h)
- Game attendance: 52,428
- Referee: Cal Lepore
- TV announcers (NBC): Dick Enberg and Merlin Olsen
- Box Score

Scoring summary

Quarter	Time	Drive			Team	Scoring information	Score	
Quarter	Time	Plays	Yards	TOP	Team	Scoring information	Raiders	Chargers
1					Raiders	Raymond Chester 65-yard touchdown reception from Jim Plunkett, Chris Bahr kick good	7	0
1					Chargers	Charlie Joiner 48-yard touchdown reception from Dan Fouts, Rolf Benirschke kick good	7	7
1					Raiders	Jim Plunkett 5-yard touchdown run, Chris Bahr kick good	14	7
2					Raiders	Kenny King 21-yard touchdown reception from Jim Plunkett, Chris Bahr kick good	21	7
2					Raiders	Mark van Eeghen 3-yard touchdown run, Chris Bahr kick good	28	7
2					Chargers	Charlie Joiner 8-yard touchdown reception from Dan Fouts, Rolf Benirschke kick good	28	14
3					Chargers	26-yard field goal by Rolf Benirschke	28	17
3					Chargers	Chuck Muncie 6-yard touchdown run, Rolf Benirschke kick good	28	24
3					Raiders	27-yard field goal by Chris Bahr	31	24
4					Raiders	33-yard field goal by Chris Bahr	34	24
4					Chargers	27-yard field goal by Rolf Benirschke	34	27
"TOP" = time of possession. For other American football terms, see Glossary of American football.							34	27

==== Super Bowl ====
Super Bowl XV: Oakland Raiders vs. Philadelphia Eagles – Game summary

Quarter	1	2	3	4	Total
Raiders	14	0	10	3	27
Eagles	0	3	0	7	10

at Louisiana Superdome, New Orleans

- Date: January 25
- Game time: 3:00 p.m.
- Game weather: none (indoor stadium)
- Game attendance: 76,135
- Referee: Ben Dreith
- TV announcers (NBC): Dick Enberg, Merlin Olsen, John Brodie and Len Dawson
- Box Score

Scoring summary

Quarter	Time	Drive			Team	Scoring information	Score	
Quarter	Time	Plays	Yards	TOP	Team	Scoring information	Raiders	Eagles
1	8:56				Raiders	Cliff Branch 2-yard touchdown reception from Jim Plunkett, Chris Bahr kick good	7	0
1	0:09				Raiders	Kenny King 80-yard touchdown reception from Jim Plunkett, Chris Bahr kick good	14	0
2	10:28				Eagles	30-yard field goal by Tony Franklin	14	3
3	12:24				Raiders	Cliff Branch 29-yard touchdown reception from Jim Plunkett, Chris Bahr kick good	21	3
3	4:35				Raiders	46-yard field goal by Chris Bahr	24	3
4	13:59				Eagles	Keith Krepfle 8-yard touchdown reception from Ron Jaworski, Tony Franklin kick good	24	10
4	8:20				Raiders	35-yard field goal by Chris Bahr	27	10
"TOP" = time of possession. For other American football terms, see Glossary of American football.							27	10
