= 1981 Oakland Raiders season =

NFL team season

- Owner: Al Davis
- General manager: Al Davis
- Head coach: Tom Flores
- Home stadium: Oakland–Alameda County Coliseum

Results
- Record: 7–9
- Division place: 4th AFC West
- Playoffs: Did not qualify

The 1981 season was the Oakland Raiders' 22nd, its 12th in the National Football League and third under head coach Tom Flores. The team failed to improve on its 1980 record of 11–5, finishing 7–9, becoming the fourth team in NFL history to enter a season as the defending Super Bowl champions and miss the playoffs. The 1981 Raiders set an NFL record by losing three consecutive shutout games. The passing game deteriorated badly, finishing 26th in the league with 28 interceptions. After the defense led the NFL in interceptions and takeaways in 1980, it was last in the league 1981 with a minus 16 turnover differential. The 1981 season was the team's last in Oakland until 1995, and the Raiders' losing record snapped a streak of 16 consecutive winning seasons. This was the only season from 1965 to 1986 in which the Raiders finished with a losing record.

== Offseason ==
=== NFL draft ===
1981 Oakland Raiders Draft
Round	Selection	Player	Position	College
1	21	Ted Watts	CB	Texas Tech
1	23	Curt Marsh	OT	Washington
2	48	Howie Long	DE	Villanova
4	111	Johnny Robinson	DT	Louisiana Tech
5	118	James Davis	CB	Southern
9	248	Curt Mohl	OT	UCLA
10	276	Frank Hawkins	HB	Nevada
11	304	Chester Willis	HB	Auburn
12	332	Phil Nelson	TE	Delaware

== Personnel ==
=== Staff / Coaches ===
1981 Oakland Raiders staff
Front office: Principal Owner/General Manager - Al Davis; Minority Co-Owner - Eddie McGah; President of the General Partner / General Manager – Al Davis; Director of Football Operations - Steve Ortmayer; Senior Executive – John Herrera; Executive Assistant / Scout - Al LoCasale; Head coaches: Head Coach – Tom Flores; Offensive coaches: Offensive Backs – Ray Willsey; Qffensive Backfield / Receivers Coach – Lew Erber; Offensive Line – Sam Boghosian; Tight Ends - Bob Mischak; Offensive Assistant - Joe Madro	Defensive coaches: Defensive Coordinator / Linebackers - Charlie Sumner; Defensive Line – Earl Leggett; Defensive Backs – Chet Franklin; Defensive Backfield Coach - Willie Brown; Special teams coaches: Special Teams Coach - Steve Ortmayer; Strength and conditioning: Strength and Conditioning - Bob Mischak

=== Roster ===
1981 Oakland Raiders roster
Quarterbacks (QB): 16 Jim Plunkett; 6 Marc Wilson; Running backs (RB): 27 Frank Hawkins; 31 Derrick Jensen; 33 Kenny King; 28 Cleo Montgomery; 30 Mark van Eeghen; 22 Arthur Whittington; Wide receivers (WR): 80 Malcolm Barnwell; 81 Morris Bradshaw; 21 Cliff Branch; 85 Bob Chandler; Tight ends (TE): 88 Raymond Chester; 46 Todd Christensen; 84 Derrick Ramsey	Offensive linemen (OL): 50 Dave Dalby C; 79 Bruce Davis T; 70 Henry Lawrence T; 60 Curt Marsh G; 65 Mickey Marvin G; 71 Lindsey Mason T; 78 Art Shell T; 66 Steve Sylvester C; 63 Gene Upshaw G; Defensive linemen (DL): 73 Dave Browning DE; 86 Cedrick Hardman DE; 75 Howie Long DE; 72 John Matuszak DE; 68 Johnny Robinson NT	Linebackers (LB): 56 Jeff Barnes OLB; 52 Greg Bracelin OLB; 83 Ted Hendricks OLB; 53 Rod Martin OLB; 57 Randy McClanahan ILB; 55 Matt Millen ILB; Defensive backs (DB): 36 Mike Davis SS; 37 Lester Hayes CB; 48 Kenny Hill FS; 42 Monte Jackson CB; 23 Odis McKinney SS; 35 Dwayne O'Steen CB; 44 Burgess Owens FS; 20 Ted Watts CB; Special teams (ST): 10 Chris Bahr K; 8 Ray Guy P	Reserve: 45 James Davis CB (IR); -- Reggie Irving G (IR); 90 Willie Jones DE (IR); 62 Reggie Kinlaw NT (IR); 82 Calvin Muhammad WR (IR); 51 Bob Nelson LB (IR); 38 Chester Willis RB (IR); Rookies in italics

== Regular season ==
=== Schedule ===
Week	Date	Opponent	Result	Record	Venue	Attendance
1	September 6	at **Denver Broncos**	**L** 7–9	0–1	Mile High Stadium	74,796
2	September 14	at Minnesota Vikings	**W** 36–10	1–1	Metropolitan Stadium	47,186
3	September 20	**Seattle Seahawks**	**W** 20–10	2–1	Oakland–Alameda County Coliseum	45,725
4	September 27	at Detroit Lions	**L** 0–16	2–2	Pontiac Silverdome	77,819
5	October 4	**Denver Broncos**	**L** 0–17	2–3	Oakland–Alameda County Coliseum	51,035
6	October 11	at **Kansas City Chiefs**	**L** 0–27	2–4	Arrowhead Stadium	76,543
7	October 18	Tampa Bay Buccaneers	**W** 18–16	3–4	Oakland–Alameda County Coliseum	42,288
8	October 25	**Kansas City Chiefs**	**L** 17–28	3–5	Oakland–Alameda County Coliseum	42,914
9	November 1	New England Patriots	**W** 27–17	4–5	Oakland–Alameda County Coliseum	44,246
10	November 8	at Houston Oilers	**L** 16–17	4–6	Houston Astrodome	45,519
11	November 15	at Miami Dolphins	**W** 33–17	5–6	Miami Orange Bowl	61,777
12	November 22	**San Diego Chargers**	**L** 21–55	5–7	Oakland–Alameda County Coliseum	50,199
13	November 29	at **Seattle Seahawks**	**W** 32–31	6–7	Kingdome	57,147
14	December 7	Pittsburgh Steelers	**W** 30–27	7–7	Oakland–Alameda County Coliseum	51,769
15	December 13	Chicago Bears	**L** 6–23	7–8	Oakland–Alameda County Coliseum	40,384
16	December 21	at **San Diego Chargers**	**L** 10–23	7–9	San Diego Stadium	52,279
Note: Intra-division opponents are in **bold** text.

=== Game summaries ===
==== Week 1 ====
Team	1	2	3	4	Total
Raiders	7	0	0	0	7
• Broncos	6	3	0	0	9

- Date: September 6
- Location: Mile High Stadium, Denver, Colorado
- Game start: 2:00 p.m.
- Game attendance: 74,796
- Game weather: 67 °F (19 °C); wind 9 mph (14 km/h)
- Referee: Jerry Markbreit
- TV announcers (NBC): Charlie Jones and Len Dawson

==== Week 2 ====
Team	1	2	3	4	Total
• Raiders	3	13	7	13	36
Vikings	0	7	3	0	10

- Date: September 14
- Location: Metropolitan Stadium, Bloomington, Minnesota
- Game start: 8:00 p.m.
- Game attendance: 47,186
- Game weather: 66 °F (19 °C); wind 13 mph (21 km/h)
- Referee: Gene Barth
- Television network: ABC

Scoring summary
Q1	OAK	Chris Bahr 21 yard field goal	OAK 3–0
Q2	OAK	Burgess Owens 30 yard interception return (Chris Bahr kick)	OAK 10–0
Q2	OAK	Todd Christensen 21 yard pass from Jim Plunkett (kick failed)	OAK 16–0
Q2	MIN	Eddie Payton 99 yard kickoff return (Rick Danmeier kick)	OAK 16–7
Q3	MIN	Rick Danmeier 37 yard field goal	OAK 16–10
Q3	OAK	Morris Bradshaw 12 yard pass from Jim Plunkett (Chris Bahr kick)	OAK 23–10
Q4	OAK	Cedrick Hardman 52 yard fumble return (Chris Bahr kick)	OAK 30–10
Q4	OAK	Malcolm Barnwell 61 yard pass from Marc Wilson (kick failed)	OAK 36–10

==== Week 3 ====
Team	1	2	3	4	Total
Seahawks	0	3	7	0	10
• Raiders	7	6	0	7	20

- Date: September 20
- Location: Oakland–Alameda County Coliseum, Oakland, California
- Game start: 1:00 p.m.
- Game attendance: 45,725
- Game weather: 64 °F (18 °C); wind 10 mph (16 km/h)
- Referee: Pat Haggerty

Scoring summary
Q1	OAK	Jim Plunkett 13 yard run (Chris Bahr kick)	OAK 7–0
Q2	SEA	Efren Herrera 26 yard field goal	OAK 7–3
Q2	OAK	Morris Bradshaw 29 yard pass from Jim Plunkett (kick failed)	OAK 13–3
Q3	SEA	Sam McCullum 36 yard pass from Jim Zorn (Efren Herrera kick)	OAK 13–10
Q4	OAK	Derrick Jensen 1 yard run (Chris Bahr kick)	OAK 20–10

=== Standings ===
AFC West
	W	L	T	PCT	DIV	CONF	PF	PA	STK
San Diego Chargers^{(3)}	10	6	0	.625	6–2	8–4	478	390	W2
Denver Broncos	10	6	0	.625	5–3	7–5	321	289	L1
Kansas City Chiefs	9	7	0	.563	5–3	7–5	343	290	W1
Oakland Raiders	7	9	0	.438	2–6	5–7	273	343	L2
Seattle Seahawks	6	10	0	.375	2–6	6–8	322	388	W1
