= 1978 Oakland Raiders season =

NFL team season

- Owner: Al Davis
- General manager: Al Davis
- Head coach: John Madden
- Home stadium: Oakland–Alameda County Coliseum

Results
- Record: 9–7
- Division place: 2nd AFC West
- Playoffs: Did not qualify

The 1978 Oakland Raiders season was the team's 19th season, and ninth as an NFL member.

1978 would prove to be an up and down year for the silver and black. Two new offensive line and defensive starts were named in the pre-season and All-Pro player, Monte Jackson, was not listed as a starter. Injuries were seen as a possible concern during the pre-season and during a pre-season game, Jack Tatum paralyzed New England Patriots wide receiver Darryl Stingley from the chest down while making a hit. Overall, the Raiders were plagued by one of quarterback Kenny Stabler's worst seasons, tossing 16 TD's, while throwing 30 interceptions. The running game also fell off from seasons past. Even the great wide receiver Cliff Branch, only caught one touchdown. The season started off with a 14–6 loss in Denver. The Raiders would rally to a 5–3 start, then climbed to 8–4. As a result of a last-minute defeat to the Seattle Seahawks 17–16, the Raiders lost twice to a single team in the same season for the first time since 1965. The following week, the Broncos completed their sweep of the Raiders with a 21–6 victory in Oakland, which was followed by a 23–6 defeat in Miami which eliminated Oakland from the playoffs for the first time since 1971. A meaningless 27–20 victory over the Minnesota Vikings kept the Raiders consecutive seasons with a winning record streak alive. This was head coach John Madden's tenth and final season and final game as head coach of the Raiders. He was replaced for the 1979 season by his wide receivers coach, Tom Flores.

== Personnel ==
=== Staff / Coaches ===
1978 Oakland Raiders staff
Front office: Principal Owner/General Manager - Al Davis; Minority Co-Owner - Eddie McGah; President of the General Partner / General Manager – Al Davis; Director of Football Operations - Steve Ortmayer; Senior Executive – John Herrera; Executive Assistant / Scout - Al LoCasale; Head coaches: Head Coach – John Madden; Assistant Head Coach / Executive Assistant - Tom Flores; Offensive coaches: Offensive Backs – Lew Erber; Receivers Coach – Tom Flores; Offensive line – Ollie Spencer; Offensive Assistant - Joe Madro	Defensive coaches: Defensive Line – Tom Dahms; Linebackers / Assistant Special Teams – Myrel Moore; Defensive Backs – Ray Willsey; Special teams coaches: Special Teams Coach – Jim Sweeney; Special Teams Coach - Steve Ortmayer

=== Roster ===
1978 Oakland Raiders roster
Quarterbacks (QB): 11 David Humm; 16 Jim Plunkett; 12 Ken Stabler; Running backs (RB): 40 Pete Banaszak; 29 Hubert Ginn; 23 Harold Hart; 34 Booker Russell; 30 Mark van Eeghen; 22 Arthur Whittington; Wide receivers (WR): 25 Fred Biletnikoff; 81 Morris Bradshaw; 21 Cliff Branch; 80 Joe Stewart; Tight ends (TE): 87 Dave Casper; 88 Raymond Chester; 84 Derrick Ramsey	Offensive linemen (OL): 50 Dave Dalby C; 70 Henry Lawrence T; 71 Lindsey Mason T; 65 Mickey Marvin G; 78 Art Shell T; 66 Steve Sylvester G/C; 63 Gene Upshaw G; Defensive linemen (DL): 72 John Matuszak DE; 76 Mike McCoy NT; 77 Charles Philyaw DE; 60 Otis Sistrunk NT; 67 Pat Toomay DE	Linebackers (LB): 56 Jeff Barnes OLB; 83 Ted Hendricks OLB; 57 John Huddleston OLB; 58 Monte Johnson ILB; 53 Rod Martin ILB; 41 Phil Villapiano OLB; 54 Bob Watts ILB; 52 Greg Westbrooks OLB; Defensive backs (DB): 20 Neal Colzie SS; 36 Mike Davis FS; 37 Lester Hayes CB; 42 Monte Jackson CB; 47 Charlie Phillips SS; 32 Jack Tatum FS; Special teams (ST): 5 Jim Breech K; 8 Ray Guy P; 14 Errol Mann K	Reserve: 46 Warren Bankston TE (IR); 24 Willie Brown CB (IR); 73 Dave Browning DE (IR); 82 Larry Brunson WR (IR); 28 Clarence Davis RB (IR); 39 Willie Hall LB (IR); 31 Derrick Jensen RB (IR); 89 Rich Martini WR (IR); 51 Bob Nelson LB (IR); 35 Terry Robiskie RB (IR); 38 Sam Scarber RB (IR); 75 John Vella T (IR); Rookies in italics

== Regular season ==
=== Schedule ===
Week	Date	Opponent	Result	Record	Venue	Attendance
1	September 3	at **Denver Broncos**	**L** 6–14	0–1	Mile High Stadium	75,092
2	September 10	at **San Diego Chargers**	**W** 21–20	1–1	San Diego Stadium	51,653
3	September 17	at Green Bay Packers	**W** 28–3	2–1	Lambeau Field	55,903
4	September 24	New England Patriots	**L** 14–21	2–2	Oakland–Alameda County Coliseum	52,904
5	October 1	at Chicago Bears	**W** 25–19 (OT)	3–2	Soldier Field	52,848
6	October 8	Houston Oilers	**W** 21–17	4–2	Oakland–Alameda County Coliseum	52,550
7	October 15	**Kansas City Chiefs**	**W** 28–6	5–2	Oakland–Alameda County Coliseum	50,759
8	October 22	at **Seattle Seahawks**	**L** 7–27	5–3	Kingdome	62,529
9	October 29	**San Diego Chargers**	**L** 23–27	5–4	Oakland–Alameda County Coliseum	52,612
10	November 5	at **Kansas City Chiefs**	**W** 20–10	6–4	Arrowhead Stadium	75,418
11	November 13	at Cincinnati Bengals	**W** 34–21	7–4	Riverfront Stadium	51,374
12	November 19	Detroit Lions	**W** 29–17	8–4	Oakland–Alameda County Coliseum	44,517
13	November 26	**Seattle Seahawks**	**L** 16–17	8–5	Oakland–Alameda County Coliseum	52,978
14	December 3	**Denver Broncos**	**L** 6–21	8–6	Oakland–Alameda County Coliseum	53,932
15	December 10	at Miami Dolphins	**L** 6–23	8–7	Miami Orange Bowl	73,003
16	December 17	Minnesota Vikings	**W** 27–20	9–7	Oakland–Alameda County Coliseum	44,643
Note: Intra-division opponents are in **bold** text.

== Game summaries ==
=== Week 2 ===
Team	1	2	3	4	Total
• Raiders	0	7	0	14	21
Chargers	0	13	0	7	20

- Date: September 10
- Location: San Diego Stadium, San Diego
- Game start: 4:00 p.m. EST
- Game weather: Sunny; 71 °F (22 °C); wind 11 mph (18 km/h)
- Referee: Jerry Markbreit
- Television network: NBC

Scoring summary
Q2		SD	Curran 14 yard pass from Fouts (Benirschke kick)	SD 7–0
Q2		OAK	Casper 6 yard pass from Stabler (Mann kick)	Tie 7–7
Q2		SD	Bauer 1 yard run (kick failed)	SD 13–7
Q4		SD	Bauer 2 yard run (Benirschke kick)	SD 20–7
Q4		OAK	Bradshaw 44 yard pass from Stabler (Mann kick)	SD 20–14
Q4	:00	OAK	Casper recovered fumble in end zone (Mann kick)	OAK 21–20

==== The Holy Roller ====
During this game, one of the most famous plays known as the Holy Roller occurred. Kenny Stabler fumbled the ball and Pete Banaszak moved it forward allowing Dave Casper to finish the job for a touchdown. It is one of the most controversial plays in the history of the NFL.

=== Week 3 ===
Team	1	2	3	4	Total
• Raiders	0	14	0	14	28
Packers	0	3	0	0	3

- Date: September 17
- Location: Lambeau Field, Green Bay, Wisconsin
- Game start: 1:00 p.m.
- Game weather: 59 °F (15 °C) • Wind 13 mph (21 km/h)
- Referee: Fred Wyant
- TV announcers (NBC): Sam Nover and Len Dawson

Scoring summary
2	OAK	Dave Casper 11 yard pass from Ken Stabler (Errol Mann kick)	Raiders 7–0
2	OAK	Terry Robiskie 11 yard run (Errol Mann kick)	Raiders 14–0
2	GB	Chester Marcol 34 yard field goal	Raiders 14–3
4	OAK	Arthur Whittington 7 yard run (Errol Mann kick)	Raiders 21–3
4	OAK	Arthur Whittington 10 yard run (Errol Mann kick)	Raiders 28–3

=== Week 6 ===
- TV Network: NBC
- Announcers: Curt Gowdy and John Brodie

This game started with nearly all Oilers as future Raider Dan Pastorini throw touchdown passes of 58 yards to Mike Renfro and 17 yards to Mike Barber and Toni Fritsch kicked a 35-yard field goal. The only Raiders points in the first 3 quarters was a 4-yard touchdown run by Arthur Whittington. Then with the Oilers leading 17–7 lead and driving deep in Raiders' territory, Oiler running back Earl Campbell ran around left tackle and lost the ball when Oakland's Dave Browning hit him, and Charles Phillips picked up the ball and ran it 96 yards to cut the Oilers lead to 3. Then in quarter four, and late Ken Stabler who had 3 interceptions prior to this drive suddenly came to life as he successfully passes 71 of the 80 yards ending with a pass to Dave Casper. Oiler defender Greg Stemrick got his hands on the short winning pass, but Casper yanked the ball loose and held on for the score. His four-yard touchdown reception helped the Raiders go to 4-2 and a tie for first with Denver in the AFC West standings.

== Standings ==
AFC West
	W	L	T	PCT	DIV	CONF	PF	PA	STK
Denver Broncos^{(3)}	10	6	0	.625	7–1	8–4	282	198	L1
Oakland Raiders	9	7	0	.563	3–5	5–7	311	283	W1
Seattle Seahawks	9	7	0	.563	4–4	6–6	345	358	W1
San Diego Chargers	9	7	0	.563	5–3	7–5	355	309	W3
Kansas City Chiefs	4	12	0	.250	1–7	4–10	243	327	L2
