= Mark van Eeghen =

American football player (born 1952)

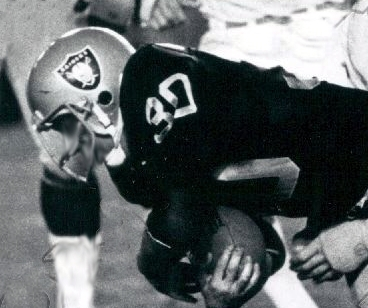
- Van Eeghen with the Oakland Raiders in 1979

No. 30, 34
- Position: Running back

Personal information
- Born: April 19, 1952 (age 74); Cambridge, Massachusetts, U.S.
- Listed height: 6 ft 2 in (1.88 m)
- Listed weight: 223 lb (101 kg)

Career information
- High school: Cranston West (Cranston, Rhode Island)
- College: Colgate (1971–1973)
- NFL draft: 1974: 3rd round, 75th overall pick

Career history
- Oakland Raiders (1974–1981); New England Patriots (1982–1983)

Awards and highlights
- 2× Super Bowl champion (XI, XV); 2× Second-team All-East (1972, 1973)

Career NFL statistics
- Rushing yards: 6,651
- Rushing average: 4
- Rushing touchdowns: 37
- Receptions: 174
- Receiving yards: 1,583
- Receiving touchdowns: 4
- Stats at Pro Football Reference

Mark K. van Eeghen (born April 19, 1952) is an American former professional football player who was a running back for ten years in the National Football League (NFL), during which he made two Super Bowl appearances. He played eight seasons for the Oakland Raiders (1974–1981) and two years with the New England Patriots (1982–1983). Van Eeghen rushed for over 1,000 yards in three consecutive seasons from 1976 to 1978.

== Early life ==
Van Eeghen was born in Cambridge, Massachusetts on April 19, 1952. He played high school football at Cranston High School West in Cranston, Rhode Island, where he graduated in 1970 and earned all-state football honors as a senior.

== College career ==
Van Eeghen played at Colgate University in Hamilton, New York, where he obtained a Bachelor of Arts degree in economics in 1974. While at Colgate, he set the school's single-season rushing record in 1973 with 1,089 yards. In his three college seasons, van Eeghen rushed for 2,591 yards and 27 touchdowns, while also catching 31 passes for 361 yards and 2 scores. Van Eeghen was inducted into Colgate's Hall of Honor in 1980.

== Professional career ==
=== Oakland Raiders ===
In the 1974 NFL Draft, van Eeghen was selected by the Oakland Raiders in the third round with the 75th overall pick. In 1974, van Eeghen took over as fullback of the Oakland Raiders from Marv Hubbard, Colgate alumnus who van Eeghen cited as an influence in picking up blockers in blitz. He had 28 carries for 139 yards as a rookie. He scored his first touchdown in the first game of the following season against the Miami Dolphins on September 22. He got 136 carries for 597 yards for the whole season with three total scores. He had his first 1,000-yard season in 1976, which saw him carry the ball 233 times for 1,012 yards, with his first 100-yard game being on November 21 against Philadelphia. In his first level of significant playoff action against the New England Patriots in the 1976 playoff run, he was the leading rusher for Oakland with 11 carries for 39 yards. With the Raiders down 21–10 in the fourth quarter, he scored on a touchdown run to narrow the deficit in a game the Raiders later won 24–21 in the Divisional Round. In Super Bowl XI, he and Clarence Davis made up a running tandem that ran for over 200 combined yards on the Vikings, with van Eeghen running for 73 yards in the 32–14 victory that gave Oakland their first Super Bowl ring. He received attention in his 1977 season with a career high in rushing yards, where he ran for 1,273 yards on 324 carries. He scored seven total touchdowns and received a Pro Bowl nomination and an All-Pro second team.

In the 1980 season, Van Eeghen was part of the Raiders team that advanced to Super Bowl XV. Van Eeghen had three touchdowns in the 1980 playoff run of four games, and two of them came in the Divisional Round against the Cleveland Browns. He ran for 45 yards on 20 carries but was utilized for short yardage runs that saw him get into the endzone twice, which included the go-ahead score to make it 14–12 in a Divisional Round game later known as Red Right 88. In the AFC Championship Game against the San Diego Chargers, van Eeghen scored a touchdown in the second quarter to give Oakland a 28–7 lead in a game that saw them win 34–27. He was the leading rusher of the game with 20 carries for 85 yards. In Super Bowl XV, the Raiders defeated the Philadelphia Eagles 27–10. Van Eeghen was the game's leading rusher with 75 yards on 18 carries. He left the Raiders in 1982 as the team's all-time leading rusher with 5,907 yards, passing Clem Daniels. He was later passed by Marcus Allen, who started playing for the team the year after van Eeghen left the team.

=== New England Patriots ===
He was waived by the Raiders after the 1982 season. He joined the New England Patriots, where he appeared in the infamous Snowplow Game. Patriots quarterback Steve Grogan attempted only five passes in the game due to the extensive snow and ice, leaving the ground attack as the only offensive option. Van Eeghen rushed the ball 22 times for 100 yards in the 3–0 Patriots win. He made his final playoff appearance in the 1982 game against the Miami Dolphins, where he ran for 40 yards on nine carries in the 28–13 Wild Card Round loss. He was used sparingly in the subsequent season, where he carried the ball 95 times for 358 yards with two touchdowns.

Van Eeghen finished his ten NFL seasons with 6,651 career rushing yards, 174 career receptions for 1,583 receiving yards, and 41 career touchdowns (37 rushing and four receiving).

== NFL career statistics ==
Legend
	Won the Super Bowl
**Bold**	Career high

=== Regular season ===
Year	Team	Games		Rushing					Receiving				
Year	Team	GP	GS	Att	Yds	Avg	Lng	TD	Rec	Yds	Avg	Lng	TD
1974	OAK	14	0	28	139	**5.0**	17	0	4	33	8.3	12	0
1975	OAK	14	8	136	597	4.4	22	2	12	42	3.5	18	1
1976	OAK	14	14	233	1,012	4.3	21	3	17	173	10.2	21	0
1977	OAK	14	14	**324**	**1,273**	3.9	27	7	15	135	9.0	30	0
1978	OAK	**16**	**16**	270	1,080	4.0	**34**	**9**	27	291	**10.8**	33	0
1979	OAK	**16**	**16**	223	818	3.7	19	7	**54**	**474**	9.3	36	**2**
1980	OAK	**16**	**16**	222	838	3.8	**34**	5	29	259	8.9	**37**	0
1981	OAK	8	3	39	150	3.8	11	2	7	60	8.6	13	0
1982	NE	9	5	82	386	4.7	17	0	2	14	7.0	9	1
1983	NE	15	11	95	358	3.8	11	2	10	102	10.2	23	0
Career		136	103	1,652	6,651	4.0	34	37	174	1,583	9.1	37	4

=== Postseason ===
Year	Team	Games		Rushing					Receiving				
Year	Team	GP	GS	Att	Yds	Avg	Lng	TD	Rec	Yds	Avg	Lng	TD
1974	OAK	2	0	–	–	–	–	–	–	–	–	–	–
1975	OAK	2	0	1	3	3.0	3	0	–	–	–	–	–
1976	OAK	3	3	51	178	3.5	11	**1**	2	22	11.0	14	0
1977	OAK	2	2	39	147	**3.8**	**16**	0	**4**	**47**	**11.8**	**23**	0
1980	OAK	**4**	**4**	**72**	**251**	3.5	14	3	**4**	44	11.0	21	0
1982	NE	1	1	9	40	4.4	9	0	1	5	5.0	5	0
Career		14	10	172	619	3.6	16	0	11	118	10.7	23	0

== Awards ==
In 2002, van Eeghen was inducted into the Rhode Island Scholar-Athlete Hall of Fame in recognition of his career. This reflected that he was voted fourth on a list of the top 50 Greatest Sports Figures by Sports Illustrated.

== Personal life ==
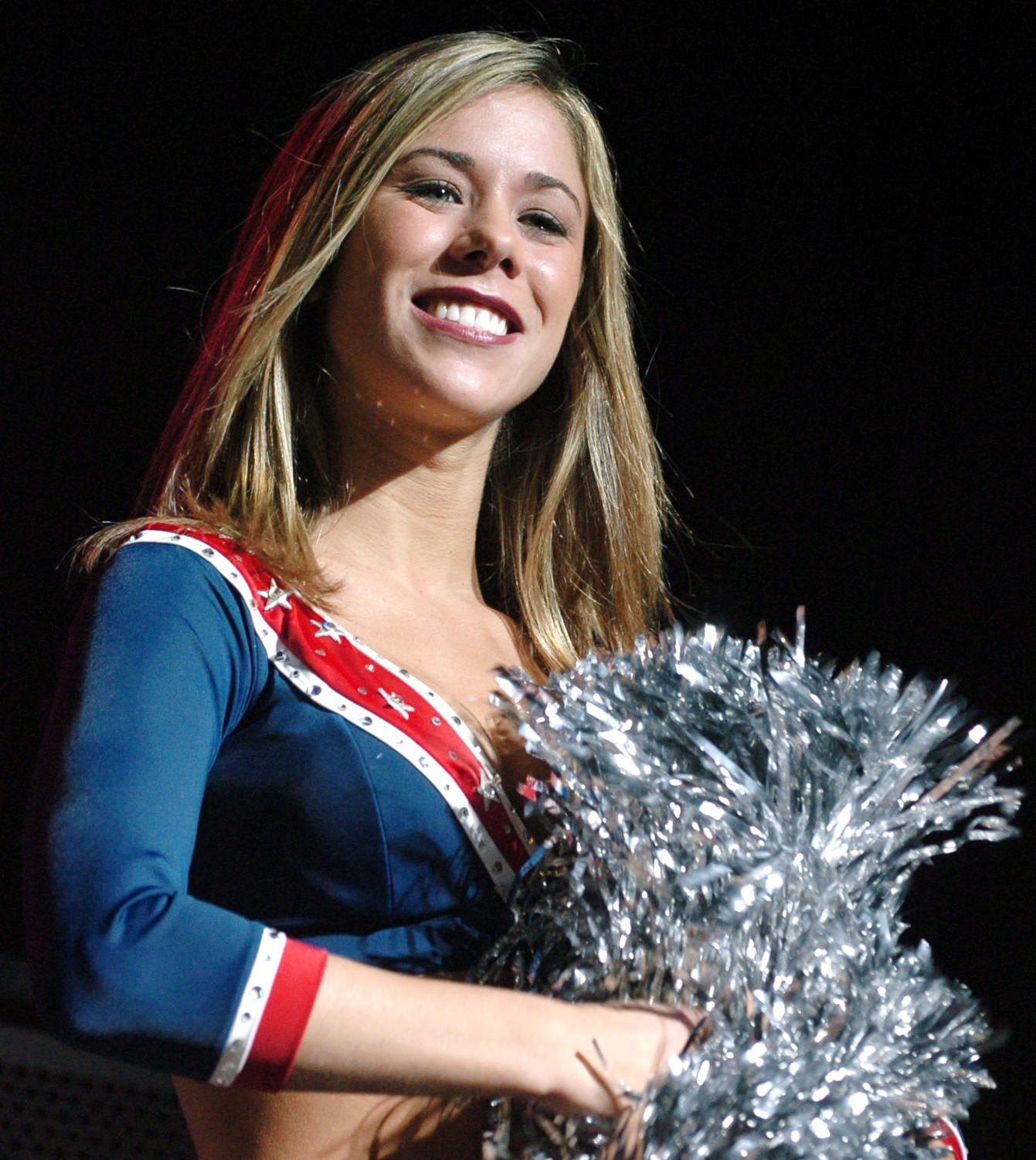
Van Eeghen's daughter Amber, a former New England Patriots cheerleader

Van Eeghen became a commercial real estate agent after retirement from football, having sold business insurance in the two offseasons prior to his retirement; he would work as an agent for 30 years.

Van Eeghen has three daughters, including Amber (born 1980), who joined the cheerleading squad of his last team, the New England Patriots, where she took part in two overseas tours with the Patriot cheerleaders to perform for U.S. troops in multiple foreign countries. She attended the University of Rhode Island, where she became captain of the "Ramettes" cheerleaders. She is currently married to Pro Bowl center Dan Koppen, a former center for the New England Patriots and Denver Broncos.

Owing to his playing days, van Eeghen had knee replacement surgery in 2003. 10 years later, a revision surgery at a local hospital, saw contract MRSA (methicillin-resistant staphylococcus aureus) in his knee. Three attempts to treat the knee saw the MRSA come back each time, which necessitated going to New England Baptist Hospital for further treatment, which saw a new knee after a three-month antibiotic course. Months later, he went back to the hospital to aid him in chronic back pain caused by spinal stenosis.
