= Cliff Branch =

American football player (1948–2019)

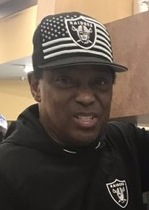
- Branch in 2019

No. 21
- Position: Wide receiver

Personal information
- Born: August 1, 1948; Houston, Texas, U.S.
- Died: August 3, 2019 (aged 71); Bullhead City, Arizona, U.S.
- Listed height: 5 ft 11 in (1.80 m)
- Listed weight: 170 lb (77 kg)

Career information
- High school: Worthing (Houston)
- College: Wharton County (1968–1969); Colorado (1970–1971)
- NFL draft: 1972: 4th round, 98th overall pick

Career history
- Oakland / Los Angeles Raiders (1972–1985); Los Angeles Cobras (1988)

Awards and highlights
- 3× Super Bowl champion (XI, XV, XVIII); 3× First-team All-Pro (1974–1976); 4× Pro Bowl (1974–1977); NFL receiving yards leader (1974); 2× NFL receiving touchdowns leader (1974, 1976); Second-team All-Big Eight (1971); NFL record: Longest receiving touchdown: 99 yards (tied)

Career NFL statistics
- Receptions: 501
- Receiving yards: 8,685
- Receiving touchdowns: 67
- Stats at Pro Football Reference
- Pro Football Hall of Fame

Clifford Branch Jr. (August 1, 1948 – August 3, 2019) was an American professional football wide receiver who played for the Oakland / Los Angeles Raiders during his entire 14-year National Football League (NFL) career. He won three NFL championships with the Raiders in Super Bowl XI, XV, and XVIII. He was selected by the Raiders in the fourth round of the 1972 NFL draft after playing college football for the Colorado Buffaloes. He was posthumously elected to the Pro Football Hall of Fame in 2022.

== College career ==
Branch attended college at the University of Colorado Boulder, where he was a sprinter on the track team and a receiver on the football team. In football with the Buffaloes in 1970, he caught 23 passes for 355 yards, had 22 carries for 119 yards and one touchdown. In 1971, he had 13 catches for 330 yards and 3 touchdowns along with 9 carries for 235 yards and 4 touchdowns.

In track, Branch set an NCAA championship meet record in the 100 meters with a time of 10.0 seconds at the 1972 NCAA championships semifinal in Eugene, Oregon. Branch placed 5th in the final with 10.1, and he said "My goal has always been to win the NCAA 100 meter championship. This is my last track meet, since I expect to sign a pro contract with the Oakland Raiders within the next two weeks." He also posted a personal best of 20.5 seconds in the 200 meters. He graduated from Colorado in 1972.

=== Personal bests ===
Event	Time (seconds)	Venue	Date
100 meters	10.0	Eugene, Oregon	June 2, 1972
200 meters	20.5	Boulder, Colorado	April 7, 1971

== Professional career ==
=== Oakland/Los Angeles Raiders ===
Branch was selected in the fourth round of the 1972 NFL draft with the 98th overall pick by the Oakland Raiders. He spent his entire 14-year NFL career with the Oakland/Los Angeles Raiders, winning three Super Bowl rings in Super Bowl XI, Super Bowl XV and Super Bowl XVIII.

Branch had a slow start to his career, as his 1972 season consisted of one start in 14 games with three combined catches for 41 yards. 1973 was slightly better, as he caught 19 catches for 290 yards in total for three touchdowns. In the October 14 game against the San Diego Chargers, he caught his first touchdown pass, doing so on a pass from Ken Stabler in the 27–17 win. His third season proved his moment. He caught 60 passes for 13 touchdowns and 1,092 yards (the former two were career highs). He went to the Pro Bowl while also being named First-team All-Pro, owing to him leading the league in yards, touchdowns, and yards per game as a receiver. In the postseason, he had his best game for the AFC Championship, where he caught nine passes for 186 yards and a touchdown, but the Raiders lost to the Pittsburgh Steelers 24–13. In his 22 games as a receiver in the postseason, it was the first of three 100-yard games and it was the most catches he had in said game.

Branch would have a four-year peak that resulted in Pro Bowl (four) and All-Pro selections (three), with the 1976 season resulting in a career high 1,111 yards to go with 12 touchdowns on 46 catches. That year, the Raiders won their first championship, and Branch caught nine combined passes in three games for under 50 yards each, but they still prevailed in the Super Bowl regardless. In his final season of play with the Raiders in 1985, his season ended prematurely when he was placed on the injured reserve list. In 1986, he again landed on the reserve list after suffering a pulled hamstring during the preseason.

After having caught 212 passes for 3,967 yards and 43 touchdowns in his first six years, Branch played the remaining eight seasons with steady but eventual decline. He caught at least 27 passes in seven of those years for at least 400 yards, with the 1980 season (44 catches, 858 yards, 7 touchdowns) being his last hit year.

On October 2, 1983, Branch caught the longest pass by a Raider, as he caught a 99-yard pass from Jim Plunkett in the second quarter versus the Washington Redskins. It was his only catch in the 37–35 loss, but he remains the only Raider to catch a 99-yard pass.

1983 would see the Los Angeles Raiders rather easily defeat Pittsburgh and Seattle in the AFC playoffs to make Super Bowl XVIII where they would play the defending champion Washington Redskins. Branch would catch six passes for 94 yards and score a touchdown in the Raiders 38–9 win, giving the Raiders their third Super Bowl win for the franchise and Branch played in all three of them. Branch finished his NFL career with 501 receptions for 8,685 yards and 67 touchdowns. In 20 playoff contests, he compiled 73 receptions for 1,289 yards, an average of 17.7 yards per catch, and five touchdowns. He held the NFL career playoff records for receptions and receiving yards, which stood until they were broken by Jerry Rice in 1993 and 1994, respectively, while with the San Francisco 49ers. Among his individual accolades were being selected to four consecutive Pro Bowl teams (1974, 1975, 1976, and 1977), and three times being selected as a first-team All-Pro (1974, 1975, 1976). In addition, he led the NFL in receiving yards once (1974) and receiving touchdowns twice (1974, 1976).

== NFL career statistics ==
Legend
	Won the Super Bowl
	NFL record
	Led the league
**Bold**	Career high

=== Regular season ===
Year	Team	Games		Receiving					Fum
Year	Team	GP	GS	Rec	Yds	Y/R	Lng	TD	Fum
1972	OAK	14	1	3	41	13.7	19	0	**2**
1973	OAK	13	0	19	290	15.3	54	3	0
1974	OAK	14	14	**60**	1,092	18.2	67	**13**	1
1975	OAK	14	14	51	893	17.5	53	9	0
1976	OAK	14	14	46	**1,111**	**24.2**	88	12	0
1977	OAK	13	13	33	540	16.4	43	6	0
1978	OAK	16	16	49	709	14.5	41	1	**2**
1979	OAK	14	13	59	844	14.3	66	6	1
1980	OAK	16	15	44	858	19.5	86	7	0
1981	OAK	16	15	41	635	15.5	53	1	0
1982	RAI	9	9	30	575	19.2	51	4	0
1983	RAI	12	12	39	696	17.8	**99**	5	0
1984	RAI	14	14	27	401	14.9	47	0	0
1985	RAI	4	0	0	0	—	0	0	0
Career		183	150	501	8,685	17.3	99	67	6

=== Postseason ===
Year	Team	Games		Receiving					Fum
Year	Team	GP	GS	Rec	Yds	Y/R	Lng	TD	Fum
1972	OAK	1	0	0	0	—	0	0	0
1973	OAK	2	0	1	8	8.0	8	0	0
1974	OAK	2	2	12	**270**	**22.5**	**72**	**2**	0
1975	OAK	2	2	7	145	20.7	37	0	0
1976	OAK	3	3	9	98	10.9	28	0	0
1977	OAK	2	2	9	172	19.1	41	0	1
1980	OAK	4	4	11	201	18.3	48	**2**	0
1982	RAI	2	2	10	203	20.3	64	0	**2**
1983	RAI	3	3	**14**	192	13.7	50	1	1
1984	RAI	1	0	0	0	—	0	0	0
Career		22	18	73	1,289	17.7	72	5	4

== Later life ==
Branch played for the Los Angeles Cobras of the Arena Football League in 1988, their only season of existence.

He was cited by the NFL Network as #5 on players not in the Pro Football Hall of Fame, noted for his speed at the position of wide receiver while being overshadowed by receivers of his time like Pittsburgh rivals Lynn Swann, John Stallworth, and teammate Fred Biletnikoff. Minus Swann (whose numbers were considerably lower), Branch had comparable statistics to each of those players as each have over 500 receptions and 8,000 yards.

Branch was a nominee to the Pro Football Hall of Fame, and was a semifinalist in 2004 and 2010. In 2011, the Professional Football Researchers Association named Branch to the PFRA Hall of Very Good Class of 2011.

On August 24, 2021, Branch was posthumously selected as the seniors finalist for the Pro Football Hall of Fame Class of 2022. On February 10, 2022, he was selected for enshrinement in the Pro Football Hall of Fame.

Branch's great–nephew Zachariah Branch plays in the NFL as a wide receiver for the Atlanta Falcons.

== Death ==
Branch died on August 3, 2019, two days after his 71st birthday. His body was found in a hotel room in Bullhead City, Arizona. According to police, his death was due to natural causes based on an initial investigative report.
