= Bob Chandler =

American football player (1949–1995)

No. 81, 85
- Position: Wide receiver

Personal information
- Born: April 24, 1949; Long Beach, California, U.S.
- Died: January 27, 1995 (aged 45); Los Angeles, California, U.S.
- Listed height: 6 ft 0 in (1.83 m)
- Listed weight: 180 lb (82 kg)

Career information
- High school: Whittier (CA)
- College: USC
- NFL draft: 1971: 7th round, 160th overall pick

Career history
- Buffalo Bills (1971–1979); Oakland/Los Angeles Raiders (1980–1982)

Awards and highlights
- Super Bowl champion (XV); 2× Second-team All-Pro (1975, 1977); Second-team All-Pac-8 (1970)

Career NFL statistics
- Receptions: 370
- Receiving yards: 5,243
- Receiving touchdowns: 48
- Stats at Pro Football Reference

Robert Donald Chandler (April 24, 1949 – January 27, 1995) was an American professional football player who was a wide receiver in the National Football League (NFL) for twelve seasons.

== Early life ==
Born in Long Beach, California in April 1949, Chandler was raised in Whittier and graduated from Whittier High School in 1967. He was considered one of the best all-around high school athletes to play in southern California. He was All-CIF in football and basketball and was one of the country's top high school decathletes, high-jumping 6 ft 7 in (2.01 m), pole-vaulted more than 13 feet (4.0 m), and put the 12-pound (5.4 kg) shot 57 feet (17 m).

== College career ==
Chandler played college football at the University of Southern California in Los Angeles; he was a captain and the team's leading receiver during his senior year in 1970. He played in two Rose Bowl games; as a junior he was named Most Valuable Player of the 1970 Rose Bowl. In the third quarter, Chandler caught a 33-yard touchdown pass from Trojan quarterback Jimmy Jones and broke several Michigan tackles to score and gave USC its margin of victory, 10–3.

== Professional career ==
A seventh round pick in the 1971 NFL draft, Chandler played nine seasons with the Buffalo Bills (1971–1979) and three with the Oakland Raiders (who moved to Los Angeles by his final playing season) (1980–1982). He led the NFL in receptions from 1975–1977 with 176, and was named Second-team All-Pro in 1975 and 1977. He also caught four passes for 77 yards in the Raiders' 27–10 Super Bowl XV victory over the Philadelphia Eagles in January 1981.

In the first game of the 1981 season against the Denver Broncos, Chandler stretched out for a pass and took a hit so severe it ruptured his spleen. Chandler was rushed to a Denver hospital where doctors saved his life. Chandler made a miraculous recovery and returned to the field later in the season, appearing in a total of eleven regular season games.. Though he wasn't able to return right away as a receiver, he was able to resume his normal duties holding the ball for Raiders placekicker Chris Bahr.

In his rookie season of 1971, Chandler saw action in only a handful of games, finishing the season five receptions for 60 yards. Bills coach Harvey Johnson was dismissed at the end of the season and the Bills named Lou Saban as their new head coach. Saban began to use Chandler more in the offense, as Chandler was a starter in all 14 games that season. He scored his first professional touchdown in a 38-14 blow out of the New England Patriots. The opposing quarterback that day was Jim Plunkett, who would be Chandler's teammate on the Raiders several years later. Over the next several seasons for Buffalo, Chandler would be one of the core starters and a favorite target of Bills quarterback Joe Ferguson. Chandler's role was greatly reduced under coach Chuck Knox in 1979. Knox preferred a solid ground game over the passing game. In 1980, Chandler was traded to the Raiders for LB Phil Villapiano and was part of a Raiders team that won Super Bowl XV.

He retired in July 1983; for his career, he had 370 receptions for 5,243 yards and 48 touchdowns, along with 11 carries for 18 yards.

Chandler and running back O. J. Simpson were teammates for a season in college (1968) and seven in the pros at Buffalo (1971–77).

== NFL career statistics ==
Legend
	Won the Super Bowl
**Bold**	Career high

=== Regular season ===
Year	Team	Games		Receiving				
Year	Team	GP	GS	Rec	Yds	Avg	Lng	TD
1971	BUF	13	0	5	60	12.0	20	0
1972	BUF	14	14	33	528	16.0	43	5
1973	BUF	14	14	30	427	14.2	37	3
1974	BUF	14	0	7	88	12.6	21	1
1975	BUF	14	13	55	746	13.6	35	6
1976	BUF	14	14	**61**	**824**	13.5	**58**	**10**
1977	BUF	14	14	60	745	12.4	31	4
1978	BUF	**16**	13	44	581	13.2	44	5
1979	BUF	3	0	0	0	0.0	0	0
1980	OAK	**16**	**16**	49	786	16.0	56	**10**
1981	OAK	11	7	26	458	**17.6**	45	4
1982	RAI	2	0	0	0	0.0	0	0
		145	105	370	5,243	14.2	58	48

=== Playoffs ===
Year	Team	Games		Receiving				
Year	Team	GP	GS	Rec	Yds	Avg	Lng	TD
1974	BUF	1	0	0	0	0.0	0	0
1980	OAK	**4**	**4**	**7**	**119**	**17.0**	**32**	0
		5	4	7	119	17.0	32	0

== Broadcasting career ==
Chandler served as a color analyst for NFL games on NBC in 1983, hosted 2 On The Town for KCBS-TV in Los Angeles from 1984 to 1987, was a sports reporter for KABC-TV in the late 1980s and hosted Amazing Games (a global documentary series about the world's most exotic sports) for ESPN in 1989. He also served as a "Technical Advisor" for the humor book The Unofficial NFL Players Handbook.

== Personal life ==
Chandler's father Gene was the mayor of Whittier, California from 1987 to 1988. Chandler married his college sweetheart, Marilyn, and had three children: Marisa, Justin, and Emma. Chandler earned a law degree from Western State University College of Law. Chandler posed for Playgirl magazine in January 1982. Chandler's niece Sarah George Chester and her daughter Payton were two of the nine victims, along with Kobe Bryant and his 13-year-old daughter Gianna, on board the helicopter that crashed in Calabasas, California on January 26, 2020. Chandler's nephew Jake George #81 is a WR for the University of Arizona Wildcats Football team.

== Death ==
Chandler began experiencing a nagging cough in 1994. A rare strain of lung cancer was discovered in his lungs in September 1994. He continued to work on Raider broadcasts while undergoing chemotherapy treatment at the USC Norris Cancer Center, but died there on Friday, January 27, 1995, at the age of 45, after a four-month battle with cancer. He was buried at Rose Hills Memorial Park in Whittier.

== Legacy ==
In 1996, USC established the annual Bob Chandler Award, given to an underclassman based on his athletic ability, academic scholarship as well as character on and off the field. The award funds a scholarship for the player's full tuition, room, and board for the following year.

Chandler was inducted into the USC Hall of Fame in November 1999. Highlights of his USC athletic career are on permanent display in USC's Heritage Hall lobby.

Whittier High School's sports facilities are named the Bob Chandler Sports Complex.

Bob was inducted into the Greater Buffalo Sports Hall of Fame in 2023.
