= Ray Guy =

American football player (1949–2022)

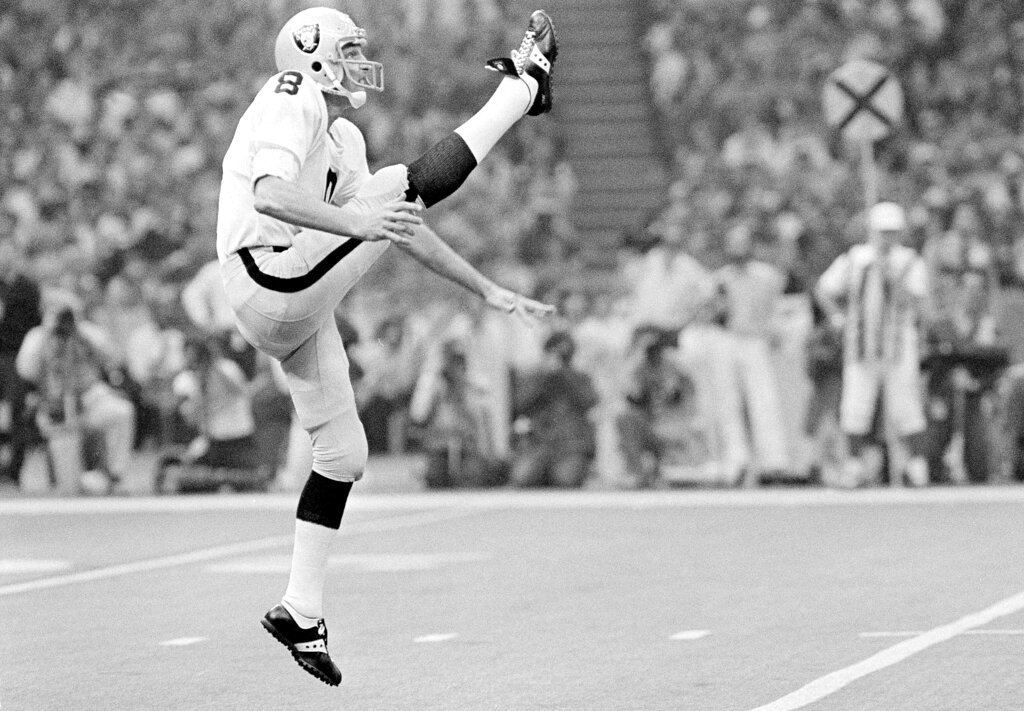
- Guy playing for the Los Angeles Raiders in 1981

No. 8
- Position: Punter

Personal information
- Born: December 22, 1949; Swainsboro, Georgia, U.S.
- Died: November 3, 2022 (aged 72); Hattiesburg, Mississippi, U.S.
- Listed height: 6 ft 3 in (1.91 m)
- Listed weight: 195 lb (88 kg)

Career information
- High school: Thomson (Thomson, Georgia)
- College: Southern Miss (1970–1972)
- NFL draft: 1973: 1st round, 23rd overall pick

Career history
- Oakland / Los Angeles Raiders (1973–1986)

Awards and highlights
- 3× Super Bowl champion (XI, XV, XVIII); 6× First-team All-Pro (1973–1978); 2× Second-team All-Pro (1979, 1980); 7× Pro Bowl (1973–1978, 1980); Golden Toe Award (1975); NFL 1970s All-Decade Team; NFL 75th Anniversary All-Time Team; NFL 100th Anniversary All-Time Team; First-team All-American (1972); Southern Miss Golden Eagles No. 44 retired

Career NFL statistics
- Punts: 1,049
- Punting yards: 44,493
- Punting average: 42.4
- Longest punt: 77
- Inside 20: 210
- Stats at Pro Football Reference
- Pro Football Hall of Fame
- College Football Hall of Fame

William Ray Guy (December 22, 1949 – November 3, 2022) was an American professional football punter who played for the Oakland / Los Angeles Raiders of the National Football League (NFL). Guy was a first-team All-American selection in 1972 as a senior for the Southern Miss Golden Eagles, and is the only pure punter ever to be drafted in the first round of the NFL draft, when the Raiders selected him with the 23rd overall pick in the 1973 NFL draft. He won three Super Bowls with the Raiders. Guy was elected to both the College Football Hall of Fame and the Pro Football Hall of Fame in 2014. An eight-time All-Pro, Guy is widely considered to be the greatest punter of all time.

With his induction to the Pro Football Hall of Fame on August 2, 2014, he became the first pure punter to be so honored. In 2004, he was inducted into the National High School Hall of Fame.

== Early life ==
Guy attended Thomson High School in Thomson, Georgia, where he was a four-sport star. Playing quarterback, safety, linebacker, and tailback, aside from kicking and punting duties, Guy led Thomson to the Georgia Class A state football championships in 1967 and 1968. Guy averaged 49.7 yards per punt in 1968. Playing basketball, Guy scored 39 points in a Thomson basketball game the day after the 1968 state championship football game, with no practice. In baseball, Guy pitched a 15-inning scoreless game for Thomson in the state playoff semifinals in 1969. He was also a member of the track team, competing in discus and triple jump.

== College career ==
Guy was both a punter and a placekicker at the University of Southern Mississippi, once kicking a then-NCAA record 61-yard field goal in a snowstorm during a game in Utah. In 1972, he kicked a 93-yard punt in a game against the University of Mississippi. He led the nation with an average of 46.2 yards per punt, earning him first-team All-American honors from the Football Writers Association of America. After his senior season, Guy was named most valuable player of the 1972 Chicago College All-Star Game, in which an all-star team of college seniors played the current Super Bowl champion. His career average of 44.7 yards per punt is a school record. He was also a starting safety at Southern Miss; during his senior season, he set a single-season school record with eight interceptions and was named an All-American defensive back by the Walter Camp Football Foundation.

Guy also played baseball at Southern Miss, striking out 266 in 200 innings and pitching a no-hitter.

== Professional career ==
Guy was the first kicker to be selected in the first round in the NFL draft, when the Oakland Raiders selected him with the 23rd overall pick of the 1973 draft.

In his career as a punter, Guy played his entire career with the Raiders and was selected to seven Pro Bowl teams, including six in a row from 1973 to 1978. He was named as the punter on the NFL's 75th and 100th anniversary teams. His trademark was kicking punts that stayed in the air for long periods of time. His punts frequently left opposing offenses pinned deep in their end of the field; by the time opposing punt returners fielded a Guy punt, the Raiders had the field covered so well that a return was impossible. Pro Football Hall of Fame historian Joe Horrigan once said of Guy, "He's the first punter you could look at and say: 'He won games.'"

In Super Bowl XVIII, Guy punted seven times for 299 yards (42.7 average), with 244 net yards (34.8 average). Five of his punts pinned the Washington Redskins inside their own 20. Due in part to his effective punting, the Los Angeles Raiders easily won the game, 38–9.

After a 1977 game against Houston, Oilers coach Bum Phillips accused Guy of using footballs illegally inflated with helium. Houston returner Billy Johnson stated that he had "never seen anyone hang kickoffs like Guy did", and that the ball was "hanging up there too long". Additionally, the Raiders had used a new ball for every punt, adding to the Oilers' suspicions. Phillips said after the game that he would send the ball to Rice University for testing. Guy punted three times for 107 yards in the game, significantly less than his career average.

During his career, Guy was also the Raiders' emergency quarterback. He also handled kickoffs in the first five years of his career.

In his 14-year career, Guy:

- Played in 207 consecutive games
- Punted 1,049 times for 44,493 yards, averaging 42.4 yards per punt, with a 33.8 net yards average
- Had 210 punts inside the 20-yard line (not counting his first 3 seasons, when the NFL did not keep track of this stat), with just 128 touchbacks
- Led the NFL in gross yards per punt three times
- Had a streak of 619 consecutive punts before having one blocked
- Has a record of 111 career punts in postseason games

=== Hall of Fame ===
Guy was inducted into the Pro Football Hall of Fame as a member of the class of 2014 on August 2, 2014. For many years before his induction, he was considered one of the most worthy players who had not yet been selected for the Pro Football Hall of Fame. He was the first punter enshrined in the Hall of Fame, and as of 2024, is still the only player at his position in the Hall. In his enshrinement speech, he proudly proclaimed, "Now the Hall of Fame has a complete team."

Guy was inducted into both the Mississippi and Georgia Sports Halls of Fame, the Bay Area Sports Hall of Fame, the National High School Sports Hall of Fame, and the College Football Hall of Fame.

== NFL career statistics ==
Legend
	Won the Super Bowl
	Led the league
**Bold**	Career high
Underline	Incomplete data

=== Regular season ===
Year	Team	GP	Punting				
Year	Team	GP	Pnt	Yds	Y/P	Lng	Blck
1973	OAK	14	69	3,127	**45.3**	72	0
1974	OAK	14	74	3,124	42.2	66	0
1975	OAK	14	68	2,979	43.8	64	0
1976	OAK	14	67	2,785	41.6	66	0
1977	OAK	14	59	2,552	43.3	74	0
1978	OAK	**16**	81	3,462	42.7	69	**2**
1979	OAK	**16**	69	2,939	42.6	71	1
1980	OAK	**16**	71	3,099	43.6	**77**	0
1981	OAK	**16**	**96**	**4,195**	43.7	69	0
1982	RAI	9	47	1,839	39.1	57	0
1983	RAI	**16**	78	3,336	42.8	63	0
1984	RAI	**16**	91	3,809	41.9	63	0
1985	RAI	**16**	89	3,627	40.8	68	0
1986	RAI	**16**	90	3,620	40.2	64	0
Career		207	1,049	44,493	42.4	77	3

=== Postseason ===
Year	Team	GP	Punting				
Year	Team	GP	Pnt	Yds	Y/P	Lng	Blck
1973	OAK	2	—	180	—	—	0
1974	OAK	2	—	516	—	—	0
1975	OAK	2	—	341	—	—	0
1976	OAK	3	16	659	41.2	60	**1**
1977	OAK	2	13	554	42.6	52	0
1980	OAK	**4**	**25**	**1,155**	**46.2**	**71**	0
1982	RAI	2	7	282	40.3	45	0
1983	RAI	3	15	615	41.0	55	0
1984	RAI	1	8	335	41.9	54	0
1985	RAI	1	2	68	34.0	35	0
Career		22	111	4,705	42.4	71	1

== Ray Guy Award ==
In 2000, the Greater Augusta Sports Council instituted the Ray Guy Award, to be awarded to the nation's best collegiate punter.

== Pro kicking camps ==
In 2005, Guy helped organize and participated in two-day kicking camps, held throughout the United States for high school punters, placekickers and long snappers.

== Personal life and death ==
Guy was married to Beverly Guy. The couple had two children, Ryan and Amber.

In 2011, Guy filed for bankruptcy and auctioned his three Super Bowl rings to help pay his debts. The auction of the rings brought in $96,216, exceeding the upper estimate of $90,000.

After a lengthy illness, Guy died on November 3, 2022, in Hattiesburg, Mississippi, at age 72. The cause was advanced-stage chronic obstructive pulmonary disease.
