= Henry Williams (American football) =

American football player (born 1956)

No. 45, 23
- Position: Defensive back

Personal information
- Born: December 2, 1956 (age 69); Greensboro, Alabama, U.S.
- Listed height: 5 ft 10 in (1.78 m)
- Listed weight: 180 lb (82 kg)

Career information
- High school: Jefferson (Los Angeles, California)
- College: San Diego State
- NFL draft: 1979: 6th round, 156th overall pick

Career history
- Oakland Raiders (1979); Toronto Argonauts (1981); Los Angeles Rams (1983); San Diego Chargers (1983); Portland Breakers (1985)

Awards and highlights
- PFWA All-Rookie Team (1979); First-team All-American (1978)

Career NFL statistics
- Interceptions: 3
- Fumble recoveries: 1
- Stats at Pro Football Reference

Henry Williams (born December 2, 1956) is an American former professional football player who was a defensive back for two seasons for the Oakland Raiders, Los Angeles Rams, and San Diego Chargers.
