= Clarence Hawkins =

American football player (born 1956)

No. 26
- Position: Running back

Personal information
- Born: July 15, 1956 (age 70); Tallahassee, Florida, U.S.
- Listed height: 6 ft 0 in (1.83 m)
- Listed weight: 205 lb (93 kg)

Career information
- High school: Newport News (VA) Warwick
- College: Florida A&M
- NFL draft: 1978: undrafted

Career history
- Oakland Raiders (1979)
- Stats at Pro Football Reference

Clarence Hawkins (born July 15, 1956) is an American former professional football player who was a running back for the Oakland Raiders of the National Football League (NFL) in 1979. He played college football for the Florida A&M Rattlers. He later became an assistant principal at Berkeley High School.
