= John Huddleston (American football) =

American football player (born 1954)

No. 57
- Position: Linebacker

Personal information
- Born: April 10, 1954 (age 72); Los Angeles, California, U.S.
- Listed height: 6 ft 3 in (1.91 m)
- Listed weight: 231 lb (105 kg)

Career information
- High school: Jesuit
- College: Utah
- NFL draft: 1976: 16th round, 446th overall pick

Career history
- Oakland Raiders (1978–1979)
- Stats at Pro Football Reference

John Charles Huddleston (born April 10, 1954) is an American former professional football player who was a linebacker for the Oakland Raiders of the National Football League (NFL). He played college football for the Utah Utes.
