= Randy McClanahan =

American football player (born 1954)

No. 57, 54
- Position: Linebacker

Personal information
- Born: December 12, 1954 (age 71); Lincoln, Nebraska, U.S.
- Listed height: 6 ft 5 in (1.96 m)
- Listed weight: 225 lb (102 kg)

Career information
- High school: Moon Valley
- College: Southwestern Louisiana
- NFL draft: 1977: undrafted

Career history
- Oakland Raiders (1977); Buffalo Bills (1978); Oakland/Los Angeles Raiders (1980–1982)
- Stats at Pro Football Reference

Randy McClanahan (born December 12, 1954) is an American former professional football player who was a linebacker for five seasons for the Oakland / Los Angeles Raiders and Buffalo Bills of the National Football League (NFL). He played college football for the Louisiana Ragin' Cajuns. He was born in Lincoln, Nebraska.
