= Dwayne O'Steen =

American football player (1954–2001)

No. 33, 35, 44
- Position: Cornerback

Personal information
- Born: December 20, 1954; Los Angeles, California, U.S.
- Died: September 15, 2001 (aged 46); Fairfield, California, U.S.
- Listed height: 6 ft 1 in (1.85 m)
- Listed weight: 193 lb (88 kg)

Career information
- High school: Manual Arts (CA)
- College: San Jose State
- NFL draft: 1978: undrafted

Career history
- Los Angeles Rams (1978–1979); Oakland Raiders (1980–1981); Baltimore Colts (1982); Tampa Bay Buccaneers (1982-1983); Green Bay Packers (1983-1984)

Awards and highlights
- Super Bowl champion (XV)

Career NFL statistics
- Interceptions: 8
- Fumble recoveries: 5
- Stats at Pro Football Reference

Dwayne O'Steen (December 20, 1954 - September 21, 2001) was an American professional football player who was a cornerback for seven seasons in the National Football League (NFL). He played college football for the San Jose State Spartans. He was a member of the Oakland Raiders squad that won Super Bowl XV. O'Steen died in 2001 of an apparent heart attack.
