= Charles Philyaw =

American football player (born 1954)

No. 77
- Position: Defensive end

Personal information
- Born: February 25, 1954 (age 72); Shreveport, Louisiana, U.S.
- Listed height: 6 ft 9 in (2.06 m)
- Listed weight: 276 lb (125 kg)

Career information
- High school: Bethune (Shreveport, Louisiana)
- College: Texas Southern (1972–1975)
- NFL draft: 1976: 2nd round, 34th overall pick

Career history
- Oakland Raiders (1976–1979); Los Angeles Express (1983); Houston Gamblers (1984); Jacksonville Bulls (1984)

Awards and highlights
- Super Bowl champion (XI); PFWA All-Rookie Team (1976)

Career NFL statistics
- Games played: 44
- Games started: 9
- Sacks: 4
- Stats at Pro Football Reference

Charles Henry Philyaw (born February 25, 1954) is an American former professional football player who played for the Oakland Raiders as a defensive end and was a member of the Raiders Super Bowl championship team of 1976. He played for Texas Southern Tigers in the NCAA.
