= Ira Matthews =

American football player (born 1957)

No. 43
- Position: Kick returner/Punt returner/Running back

Personal information
- Born: August 23, 1957 (age 69); Rockford, Illinois, U.S.
- Listed height: 5 ft 8 in (1.73 m)
- Listed weight: 175 lb (79 kg)

Career information
- High school: Rockford East
- College: Wisconsin
- NFL draft: 1979: 6th round, 142nd overall pick

Career history
- Oakland Raiders (1979–1981); Green Bay Packers (1982)

Awards and highlights
- Super Bowl champion (XV)

Career NFL statistics
- Rushing yards: 14
- Rushing average: 2
- Touchdowns: 1
- Stats at Pro Football Reference

Ira Richard Matthews, III (born August 23, 1957) is an American former professional football player who was a running back and wide receiver for three seasons with the Oakland Raiders of the National Football League (NFL). Matthews stood 5'8" and weighed 175 pounds which made it difficult to catch him. He played college football for the Wisconsin Badgers, leading the nation in punt returns in 1978 and averaging 16.9 yards per punt return, including three for touchdowns.

Matthews was selected by the Raiders in the sixth round (#142 overall) of the 1979 NFL draft, where he earned recognition as one of the greatest returners in the franchise's history. He was named to the NFL 1979 All-Pro Team as a return man during his rookie season. On October 25, 1979, Matthews set a Monday Night Football record for kick-off returns with a 104-yard return against the San Diego Chargers. Matthews was a member of the Oakland Raiders Super Bowl XV championship team. During his three seasons with the Raiders he helped lead his team to win the 1980 Wild Card, 1981 AFC West Conference Championship, and Super Bowl XV. In three seasons with the Raiders, Matthews returned 95 punts for 678 yards and 71 kickoffs for 1602 yards and a touchdown.

His active NFL career ended at the conclusion of the 1982 season, after spending the entire season on the Green Bay Packers injured reserve.

In 1983, Matthews resurfaced in professional American football when he signed mid-season with the Boston Breakers of the United States Football League. Appearing in 5 games, he returned 13 kicks for 210 yards and 3 punts for 15 yards.

== See also ==
- List of NCAA major college yearly punt and kickoff return leaders
