= Bob Nelson (linebacker) =

American football player (born 1953)

No. 56, 66, 51
- Position: Linebacker

Personal information
- Born: June 30, 1953 (age 73); Stillwater, Minnesota, U.S.
- Listed height: 6 ft 4 in (1.93 m)
- Listed weight: 232 lb (105 kg)

Career information
- High school: Stillwater
- College: Nebraska
- NFL draft: 1975: 2nd round, 42nd overall pick

Career history
- Buffalo Bills (1975–1977); San Francisco 49ers (1978–1979); Oakland/Los Angeles Raiders (1980–1984)

Awards and highlights
- 2× Super Bowl champion (XV, XVIII); Second-team All-Big Eight (1974)

Career NFL statistics
- Sacks: 8
- Fumble recoveries: 2
- Interceptions: 1
- Stats at Pro Football Reference

Robert Lee Nelson (born June 30, 1953) is an American former professional football player who was a linebacker in the National Football League (NFL). He played college football for the Nebraska Cornhuskers. Nelson played in the NFL for the Buffalo Bills, the San Francisco 49ers, and the Oakland/Los Angeles Raiders. He started in Super Bowl XV and in Super Bowl XVIII for the Raiders.
