= Rich Martini =

American football player (born 1955)

No. 89, 86
- Position: Wide receiver

Personal information
- Born: November 19, 1955 (age 70); Berkeley, California, U.S.
- Listed height: 6 ft 2 in (1.88 m)
- Listed weight: 185 lb (84 kg)

Career information
- High school: Ygnacio Valley (Concord, California)
- College: UC Davis
- NFL draft: 1977: 7th round, 190th overall pick

Career history
- Oakland Raiders (1979–1980); New Orleans Saints (1981)

Awards and highlights
- Super Bowl champion (XV)

Career NFL statistics
- Receptions: 33
- Receiving yards: 367
- Receiving TDs: 2
- Stats at Pro Football Reference

Richard William Martini (born November 19, 1955) is an American former professional football player who played wide receiver for four seasons for the Oakland Raiders and one season for the New Orleans Saints. He played on special teams in the Raiders Super Bowl victory against the Philadelphia Eagles in Super Bowl XV. Martini attended UC Davis, where he also excelled in baseball as a centerfielder, and was drafted by the Los Angeles Dodgers and Texas Rangers.

== Honors ==
- He was inducted into the Cal Aggie Athletic Hall of Fame in 1987, the U.C. Davis Baseball Hall of Fame in 2004, and the Ygnacio Valley High School Athletic Hall of Fame in 2016.
