= Arthur Whittington =

American football player (1955–2024)

No. 22, 21
- Position: Running back

Personal information
- Born: September 4, 1955; Cuero, Texas, U.S.
- Died: April 22, 2024 (aged 68); Houston, Texas, U.S.
- Listed height: 5 ft 11 in (1.80 m)
- Listed weight: 185 lb (84 kg)

Career information
- High school: Cuero
- College: SMU
- NFL draft: 1978: 7th round, 176th overall pick

Career history
- Oakland Raiders (1978–1981); Buffalo Bills (1982); Oakland Invaders (1983-1985)

Awards and highlights
- Super Bowl champion (XV)

Career NFL statistics
- Rushing yards: 1,592
- Rushing average: 3.6
- Total touchdowns: 16
- Stats at Pro Football Reference

Arthur Lee Whittington (September 4, 1955 – April 22, 2024) was an American professional football player who was a running back in the National Football League (NFL). He played college football for the SMU Mustangs. Selected in the seventh round of the 1978 NFL draft, Whittingham played in the NFL for five seasons with the Oakland Raiders and the Buffalo Bills. From 1983 to 1985, he played with the Oakland Invaders of the United States Football League (USFL).

== Professional career ==
As a rookie in 1978, Whittington proved to be a valuable weapon in the Raiders backfield. He finished the year with 661 yards rushing and seven scores while recording 23 catches for 106 yards over nine starts. The next season, he started just seven games but ran for 397 yards and two touchdowns while recording 19 catches for 240 yards. By 1980, Whittington had developed a complementary role, running for just 299 yards and 3 TD in two starts but had 19 catches for 205 yards. His final year with Oakland, 1981, saw him start 2 games and run for 220 yards and one touchdown while recording 23 catches for 213 yards and 2 TD.

Along with being a serviceable running back, Whittington proved to be an adept kick returner. In 1978, he averaged 20.6 yards on 23 kick returns. In 1980, he averaged 18.7 yards on 21 returns including 1 TD. In 1981, he averaged 22.5 yards on 25 returns.

== Personal life ==
Whittington had five children. His two daughters Amber and Ashton are both YouTube personalities. He was also the uncle of Jordan Whittington, a former receiver for the University of Texas and 2024 sixth round draft pick of the Los Angeles Rams. He died of cancer in Houston on April 22, 2024, at the age of 68.
