= Jeff Barnes =

American football player (born 1955)

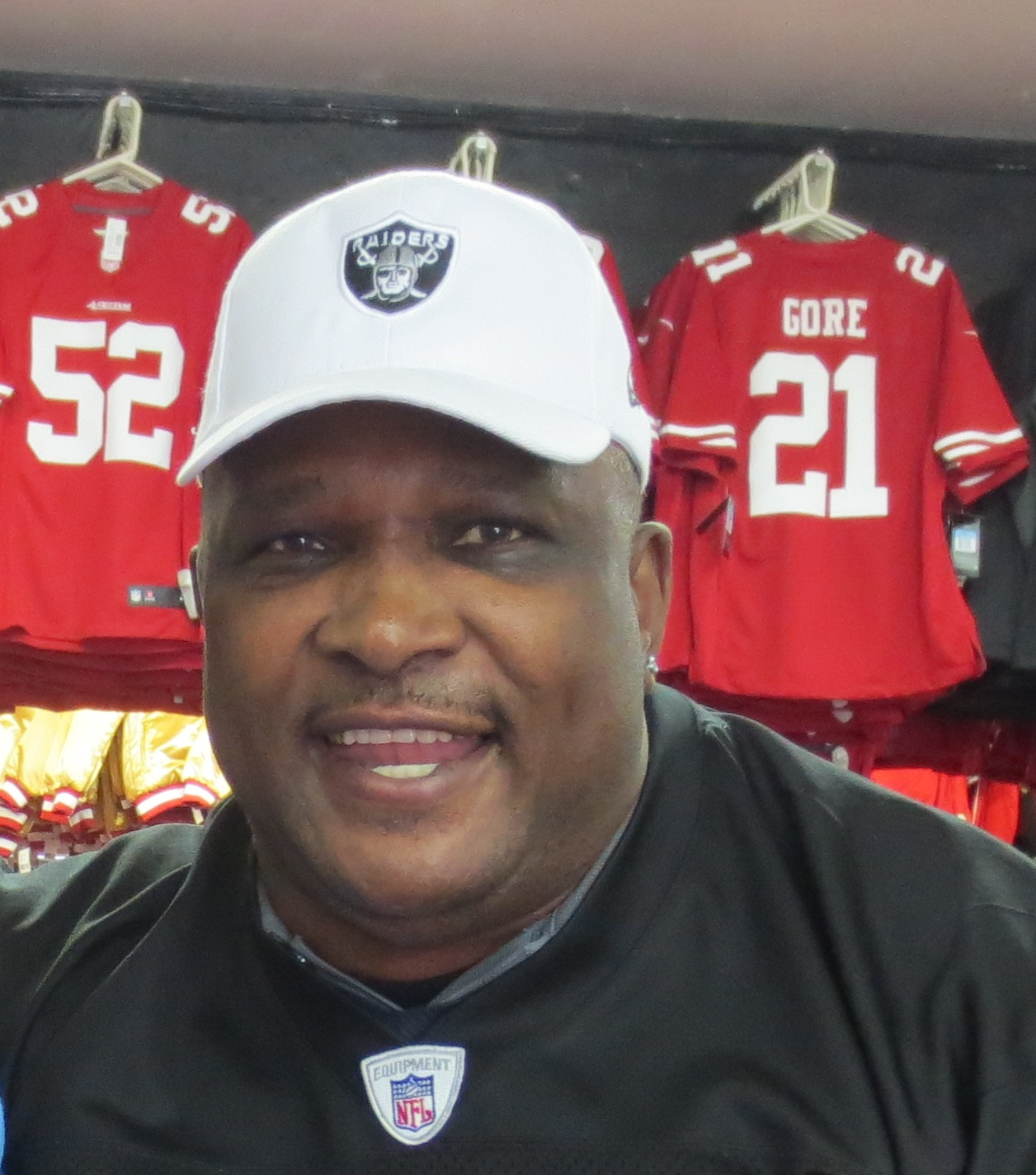
- Barnes in 2012

No. 56
- Position: Linebacker

Personal information
- Born: March 1, 1955 (age 71); Philadelphia, Pennsylvania, U.S.
- Listed height: 6 ft 2 in (1.88 m)
- Listed weight: 223 lb (101 kg)

Career information
- High school: Hayward (Hayward, California)
- College: California
- NFL draft: 1977: 5th round, 139th overall pick

Career history
- Oakland/Los Angeles Raiders (1977–1987)

Awards and highlights
- 2× Super Bowl champion (XV, XVIII)

Career NFL statistics
- Sacks: 8.5
- Fumble recoveries: 8
- Interceptions: 5
- Stats at Pro Football Reference

Jeff Barnes (born March 1, 1955) is an American former professional football player who was a linebacker for the Oakland/Los Angeles Raiders of the National Football League (NFL). He was a member of the Los Angeles and Oakland Raiders from 1977 to 1987 of the National Football League (NFL). He played college football for the California Golden Bears and was selected by the Raiders in the 5th round of the 1977 NFL draft.

== Early life ==
Jeff Barnes grew up in Hayward and attended Hayward High School from 1969 to 1973. Barnes excelled on defense for the Farmers using his size at 6 feet 2 inches and 220 pounds to intimidate anyone who dared to carry the ball on his turf. A big time hitter who struck fear into the hearts of his opponents, Barnes made 1st All-HAAL and All-South County his junior year (1971) and senior year (1972).

== College career ==
After graduation from Hayward High in 1973, he then continued his football career at Chabot College during the 1973 and 1974 seasons. Barnes was also a special teams starter, blocking two kicks which were recovered for touchdowns. He made All-Golden Gate conference and attracted the attention of major college football coaches around the country for his rough and rugged style of play at linebacker.

Barnes is one of the toughest defensive players to ever play for the Gladiators. He was elected to the Chabot Athletic Hall of Fame in 2000. After playing at Chabot for two years, Barnes transferred to the University of California, Berkeley, from 1975-1976, helping the Golden Bears to a 1975 Pacific-8 title. His outstanding play at Cal prompted the Oakland Raiders to select Barnes in the fifth round of the 1977 NFL draft.

== Professional career ==
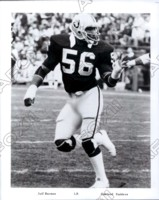
Barnes playing for the Raiders in 1979

Barnes had an outstanding rookie year with the Raiders, becoming a special teams superstar who was recognized for his rough and reckless play. He also saw action at linebacker for the Raiders in 1977. He was honored on the cover of Fremont-based Community Sport Magazine in December of that year. Barnes continued to contribute to the Raiders success in 1978, playing all 16 games.

The 1978 season would be the last for head coach John Madden. But Barnes remained with the Raiders, playing for a new head coach and former Raider starting quarterback (1960-1966), Tom Flores. The Raiders, under Flores, won two Super Bowl Championships - the first in 1981 as Oakland Raiders and the second in Los Angeles.

Barnes enjoyed 10 seasons with the raiders: five as a member of the Oakland Raiders and five as the Los Angeles Raiders. He played a total of 157 games in his NFL career with the Raiders. He intercepted 5 passes and had 6.5 sacks. However, nothing tops the two Super Bowl Championships that Barnes won as a member of the Raiders.

== Scott Duncan Award ==
The Scott Duncan Award was established in 1974 by the California coaching staff in memory of running back Scott Duncan, who was killed in an auto accident in the summer of 1974. The award is awarded to the most valuable special teams junior. Barnes received this award in 1975 from UC Berkeley.
