= Dave Browning =

American football player (born 1956)

No. 73, 74
- Position: Defensive end

Personal information
- Born: August 18, 1956 (age 70); Spokane, Washington, U.S.
- Listed height: 6 ft 5 in (1.96 m)
- Listed weight: 245 lb (111 kg)

Career information
- High school: Spangle (WA)
- College: Washington
- NFL draft: 1978: 2nd round, 54th overall pick

Career history
- Oakland/Los Angeles Raiders (1978–1982); New England Patriots (1983)

Awards and highlights
- Super Bowl champion (XV); First-team All-Pac-8 (1977)

Career NFL statistics
- Sacks: 21.5
- Fumble recoveries: 5
- Interceptions: 1
- Stats at Pro Football Reference

David Browning (born August 18, 1956) is an American former professional football player who was a defensive end in the National Football League (NFL). He played college football for the Washington Huskies. Browning played in the NFL for the Oakland Raiders from 1978 to 1981, for the Los Angeles Raiders in 1982, and for the New England Patriots in 1983. He played in Super Bowl XV for the Raiders.
