= Joe Madro =

American football coach (1913–1994)

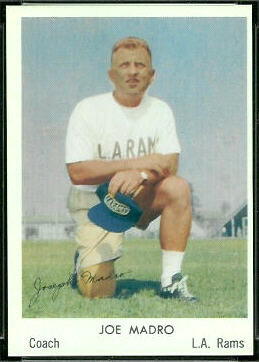

Profile
- Positions: Coach, Offensive guard (College)

Personal information
- Born: March 21, 1913; Cleveland, Ohio, U.S.
- Died: September 24, 1994 (aged 81); Alameda, California, U.S.

Career information
- High school: Shaker Heights (OH), John Adams (OH)
- College: Ohio State

Career history
- Cincinnati Bearcats (1949–1954) Offensive line coach; Los Angeles Rams (1955–1957) Offensive line coach; Los Angeles Rams (1958) Defensive line coach; Los Angeles Rams (1959) Offensive backs coach; Los Angeles / San Diego Chargers (1960–1971) Offensive line coach; Houston Oilers (1972–1974) Offensive line coach; Oakland Raiders (1977–1982) Assistant coach

Awards and highlights
- AFL champion (1963); Super Bowl champion (XV)

Joseph Charles Madro (March 21, 1913 – September 24, 1994) was an American football coach in the National Football League (NFL) for 25 seasons, primarily with the Los Angeles Chargers. He played offensive guard at Ohio State.

== Early life and college ==
Joe Madro was born on March 21, 1913, in Cleveland, Ohio. He went to high school at Shaker Heights (OH), and John Adams (OH).

He played offensive guard at Ohio State. He later coached the offensive line.

== Coaching career ==
=== Cincinnati Bearcats ===
He was the Cincinnati Bearcats offensive line coach from 1949 to 1954.

=== Los Angeles Rams ===
From 1955 to 1957, he was the Los Angeles Rams offensive line coach. He was the defensive line coach in 1958, and the offensive backs coach in 1959.

=== Los Angeles/San Diego Chargers ===
In 1960, he went to the Los Angeles Chargers to be with their head coach Sid Gillman. He had been with Gillman since he was in college. He was their offensive line coach for 12 seasons, from 1960 to 1972. He won the 1963 AFL championship with the Chargers.

=== Houston Oilers ===
In 1972, he went to the Houston Oilers to become line coach. He was there for 3 seasons.

=== Oakland Raiders ===
He did not coach in 1975 or in 1976. In 1977, he became an assistant coach for the Oakland Raiders. He was there from 1977 to 1982. He won the Super Bowl in 1980.

== Later life ==
He was Sid Gillman's presenter when he was inducted into the Hall of Fame in 1983. He died on September 24, 1994, in Alameda, California. He was 81 at the time of his death.
