= Lew Erber =

American football player and coach (1934–1990)

Profile
- Position: Running back

Personal information
- Born: May 27, 1934; Clifton, New Jersey, U.S.
- Died: February 26, 1990 (aged 55); El Cajon, California, U.S.

Career information
- High school: Englewood (NJ)
- College: Montclair State University

Career history

Playing
- Montclair State (1952-1955)

Coaching
- Iowa State (1967-1968) Assistant coach; Cal Western (1969-1972) Assistant coach; San Diego State (1973) Graduate assistant coach; UC-Berkeley (1974); San Francisco 49ers (1975) Special teams coach; Oakland Raiders (1976-1978) Running backs coach; Oakland Raiders (1979-1981) Receivers coach; New England Patriots (1982-1984) Offensive coordinator; Los Angeles Rams (1985-1986) Wide receivers coach; Los Angeles Cobras (1988) Assistant coach

Awards and highlights
- 2× Super Bowl champion (XI, XV)
- Coaching profile at Pro Football Reference

Lewis Albert Erber Jr. (May 27, 1934 – February 26, 1990) was an American football coach. He was the offensive coordinator for the New England Patriots for three seasons. He won two Super Bowls with the Oakland Raiders. His coaching career began in 1967 and ended after 1988.

== Early life and education ==
Erber was born on May 27, 1934, in Clifton, New Jersey, and played prep soccer at Dwight Morrow High School in Englewood, New Jersey. He went to college at Montclair State University. He played running back from 1952 to 1955.

== Coaching career ==
=== College coaching career ===
He began his coaching career as an assistant coach for the Iowa State Cyclones in 1967. He then had jobs with Cal Western, San Diego State Aztecs, and California Golden Bears.

=== Professional coaching career ===
He started his professional coaching career as the special teams coach of the San Francisco 49ers in 1975. The next year he went to the Oakland Raiders as a running backs coach. With the Raiders he won two Super Bowls. In 1982 he went to the New England Patriots as their offensive coordinator. He stayed there until 1985, where he went to the Los Angeles Rams. In 1988 he became an assistant coach for the Los Angeles Cobras of the Arena Football League.

== Later life and death ==
In 1979 he was inducted into the MSU Athletics Hall of Fame. He died on February 26, 1990, at the age of 55.
