= Steve Sylvester (American football) =

American football player (born 1953)

No. 66
- Positions: Guard, center, tackle

Personal information
- Born: March 4, 1953 (age 73); Cincinnati, Ohio, U.S.
- Listed height: 6 ft 4 in (1.93 m)
- Listed weight: 260 lb (118 kg)

Career information
- High school: Moeller (Cincinnati)
- College: Notre Dame
- NFL draft: 1975: 10th round, 259th overall pick

Career history
- Oakland/Los Angeles Raiders (1975–1983)

Awards and highlights
- 3× Super Bowl champion (XI, XV, XVIII); National champion (1973); Third-team All-American (1974)

Career NFL statistics
- Games played: 106
- Games started: 31
- Stats at Pro Football Reference

Steve Sylvester (born March 4, 1953) is an American former professional football player who was an offensive lineman for nine seasons in the National Football League (NFL) for the Oakland/Los Angeles Raiders. He played college football for the University of Notre Dame. He was drafted by the Oakland Raiders in the 10th round (259th overall) of the 1975 NFL Draft..
