= Lindsey Mason =

American football player (born 1955)

No. 71, 78, 79
- Position: Offensive tackle

Personal information
- Born: August 1, 1955 (age 71); Baltimore, Maryland, U.S.
- Listed height: 6 ft 5 in (1.96 m)
- Listed weight: 265 lb (120 kg)

Career information
- College: Kansas
- NFL draft: 1978: 3rd round, 82nd overall pick

Career history
- Oakland Raiders (1978–1981); San Francisco 49ers (1982); Baltimore Colts (1983)

Awards and highlights
- Super Bowl champion (XV); Second-team All-Big Eight (1977)

Career NFL statistics
- Games played: 57
- Games started: 12
- Stats at Pro Football Reference

Lindsey Michael Mason (born August 1, 1955) is an American former professional football player who was an offensive tackle in the National Football League (NFL). Mason played college football for the Kansas Jayhawks. Mason was selected by the Oakland Raiders in the third round (82nd overall pick) of the 1978 NFL draft. Mason played five seasons for the Oakland Raiders (1978, 1980–1981), the San Francisco 49ers (1982), and the Baltimore Colts (1983).
