= List of NFL nicknames =

The following nicknames are given to a unit (defensive, offensive, and special teams) or a secondary nickname given to some teams used to describe a style of play or attitude of teams at times in accordance with phrases in popular culture of the time. They are not the official franchise nicknames of the National Football League (NFL). Since the NFL's inception in 1920, players, coaches, team executives, league officials, and football games have been given nicknames based on either individual achievements, team achievements, historical events, etc.

== Teams and units ==
Nicknames for entire teams, whole offensive units, defensive units, or special teams. Names which are marked by an asterisk (*) are team nicknames which may have been coined by team members or local media, but never became well known to the public outside of the teams media market for a multitude of reasons, but most likely due to poor performance. The nickname was earned for accomplishments on the field.

=== A ===
- Ain'ts: Nickname given to the New Orleans Saints after their 1980 season of 14 consecutive losses. The name persisted somewhat as, although they would later qualify for the playoffs several times since then, they did not win a playoff game until their defeat of the defending Super Bowl champion Rams in the wild-card round of the 2000–01 playoffs.
- America's Team: Nickname given to the Dallas Cowboys for having a large number of fans outside its immediate local area (The term itself is likely derived from the title of the team's 1978 highlight film.).

=== B ===
- The Bickering Bills: The 1989 Buffalo Bills, so-called due to internal conflict within the organization between quarterback Jim Kelly and several veteran players as well as a fistfight that occurred between two assistant coaches.
- Big Blue: An abridged version of the New York Giants nickname Big Blue Wrecking Crew
- Big Blue Wrecking Crew: Name of the New York Giants defensive team from 1986 to 1990.
- Bills West: The 2001 San Diego Chargers, so named because of the signing of the Buffalo Bills' former general manager, John Butler, along with several Buffalo Bills players, including quarterback Doug Flutie.
- Blitzburgh: Name of the Pittsburgh Steelers defensive unit since the mid-1990s and their tendency to relentlessly attack opposing quarterbacks.
- The Blue Wave: Name of the Seattle Seahawks teams of the 1980s which included Hall of Famers Steve Largent and Kenny Easley. Quarterbacked by Dave Krieg and coached by Chuck Knox. Fans of the team would perform the wave every game.
- The Boogeymen: 2019 New England Patriots linebacker corps, specifically Dont'a Hightower, Jamie Collins Sr., and Kyle Van Noy.
- The Boston TE Party: A play on the name of the actual Boston Tea Party, it was the New England Patriots' tight end corps from 2010 to 2012, featuring Rob Gronkowski and Aaron Hernandez.
- Bring The Heat Boulevard: Robert Mathis and Dwight Freeney, Defensive linemen on the Peyton Manning-era Indianapolis Colts.
- Bruise Brothers: San Diego Chargers defensive line in the 1970s and 1980s.
- Bull Elephant backfield: running backs of the 1950s Rams: Dick Hoerner, Paul "Tank" Younger, and "Deacon" Dan Towler.
- Bulls on Parade: Refers to the Houston Texans defense, starting in the 2011 season (but is still a nickname for the Texans). After the hiring of Wade Phillips, the defense went from almost last ranked in the NFL to ranked second at the end of the 2011 season, winning the AFC South for the first time and reaching the post-season for the first time in franchise history. The name is taken from the Rage Against the Machine song of the same name.
- Bungles: Name referring to the Cincinnati Bengals teams of the 1990s and 2000s, whose string of losing seasons with records 8–8 or worse spanned 14 consecutive years in addition to numerous draft busts. Name also used for any failing Cincinnati Bengals team thereafter. Coined by former Pittsburgh Press sportswriter Glen Sheely and popularized by Pittsburgh Steelers announcer Myron Cope.

=== C ===
- Cardiac Bears: The Chicago Bears NFC North championship team of 2025. Noted for frequent come-from-behind victories under head coach Ben Johnson and quarterback Caleb Williams, including a dramatic overtime win against rivals, The Green Bay Packers.
- Cardiac Cardinals (Cards): The St. Louis Cardinals NFC East championship teams of 1974 (10–4) and '75 (11–3). Noted for their come-from-behind wins under their head coach, Don Coryell. The name was resurrected for the 1998 team that upset Dallas in the wild card game.
- Cardiac Cats: Nickname appears in media whenever a cat team (Lions, Bengals, Panthers, Jaguars) has a comeback win or a generally nail-biting conclusion to their game. Most famously used during the 2003 Carolina Panthers season, which ended in a last-minute loss in the Super Bowl, and later to the Detroit Lions of the 2010s.
- Cardiac Jags: The Jacksonville Jaguars earned this nickname because of making several comeback wins and/or winning nail-biters.
- Cowgirls: Derogatory nickname for the Dallas Cowboys, in reference to their cheerleaders.

=== D ===
- Da Bears: Slang nickname given to the Chicago Bears made popular by the Bill Swerski's Superfans sketches of the early 1990s on Saturday Night Live. Sometimes used to retroactively refer to the 1985 Bears.
- The Dark Side: Nickname for the 2025 Seattle Seahawks defense under head coach Mike Macdonald, who led the league in scoring among all defenses over the season and won Super Bowl LX. The nickname was influenced by the Pacific Northwest region's own nickname of "The Big Dark".
- Deflatriots: Used in reference to Deflategate. Derogatory insult towards the New England Patriots.
- Dirty Birds: The 1998 Atlanta Falcons (but is still a nickname for the Falcons). The name originates from an end zone dance started by Jamal Anderson that was adopted by all the players upon scoring.
- Dome Patrol: The linebacker corps, specifically Rickey Jackson, Vaughan Johnson, Sam Mills, and Pat Swilling, of the National Football League's New Orleans Saints during the late 1980s and early 1990s.
- Doomsday Defense: The 1970s Dallas Cowboys defensive team. Doomsday I, the unit that led the Cowboys to victory in Super Bowl VI, was anchored by future Pro Football Hall of Fame members Herb Adderley, Bob Lilly, and Mel Renfro, while Doomsday II, which spearheaded the drive to the title in Super Bowl XII, featured Hall of Famer Randy White and fellow defensive linemen Harvey Martin and Ed "Too Tall" Jones.

=== E ===
- Everybody Eats: The 2024 Buffalo Bills offense, based upon a multifaceted attack in which any of the team's skill positions is roughly equally likely to receive the ball, as opposed to a singular marquee player who draws the majority of attention from the opposing defense. 13 Bills players scored at least one receiving touchdown in 2024, tying an NFL record.
- Electric Company: The 1970s Buffalo Bills offensive line. They were given that name because they "turned on the 'Juice'" by paving the way for star halfback O. J. Simpson, who was nicknamed "Juice", because a common nickname for orange juice is also O. J.
- Evil Empire: Name associating the New England Patriots dynasty of the 2000s. Coach Bill Belichick was deemed "evil" after the Spygate scandal and the term is a play on Belichick's frequent use of hooded sweatshirts on the sideline, making him resemble the Emperor Palpatine character from the Star Wars motion picture series.

=== F ===
- Fearsome Foursome: The 1960s Los Angeles Rams defensive line.

=== G ===
- G Men: Nickname of the New York Giants.
- Gang Green: Nickname of the New York Jets, or the Philadelphia Eagles defensive team from 1987 to 1990, when the team was coached by Buddy Ryan.
- The Ghosts: The 2019 New England Patriots secondary, in reference to Jets quarterback Sam Darnold "seeing ghosts" on Monday Night Football.
- The Gravediggers: The 2020 Tampa Bay Buccaneers front seven, which led the league in rushing defense and were 6th in the league in sacks.
- The Greatest Show on Turf: The 1999–2001 St. Louis Rams record-breaking offensive team featuring Kurt Warner, Marshall Faulk, Isaac Bruce, Torry Holt, Az-Zahir Hakim, and Ricky Proehl. They were recognized as one of the greatest offenses to play in NFL history. (Note: The first team referred to as "The Greatest Show on Turf" was the 1992 Houston Oilers, the title of their 1993 NFL Films highlight film. The Oilers employed the wide-open run-and-shoot offense.)
- Gritz Blitz: Nickname for the 1977 Atlanta Falcons defense led by then defensive assistant Jerry Glanville that allowed the fewest points per game (9.2) in NFL history.
- Ground Chuck: Nickname for the conservative, ball-control offense favored by coach Chuck Knox.

=== H ===
- Homeland Defense: Nickname for the New England Patriots defense during their runs to Super Bowl XXXVIII and XXXIX.
- The Hogs: The Washington Redskins' offensive line in the 1980s. They were considered one of the largest and strongest offensive lines in football history, originally consisting of Joe Jacoby, Russ Grimm, Mark May, George Starke, and Jeff Bostic.
- Hosses: Affection name used by media and fans for the Baltimore Colts, especially during the late 1950s and 1960s.

=== J ===
- Jackson 5: Nickname of the 2017 Jacksonville Jaguars secondary coming from the famous music group
- Jeff Stoutland University: Nickname for Philadelphia Eagles offensive line coach Jeff Stoutland's development of offensive linemen. During his tenure on the Eagles from 2013 to 2025, Stoutland coached six different Pro Bowl linemen, including Brandon Brooks, Landon Dickerson, Lane Johnson, Jason Kelce, Evan Mathis, and Jason Peters (Johnson, Kelce, Mathis, and Peters also received All-Pro honors). The nickname was originally coined during the 2022 season by Eagles offensive lineman Jordan Mailata.

=== K ===
- Kardiac Kids: The 1980 Cleveland Browns offensive unit featuring Brian Sipe, Greg Pruitt, Ozzie Newsome, Dave Logan, and Reggie Rucker who had a penchant for having games decided in the final moments.
- The Killer Bees: The 1982 Miami Dolphins defensive team; seven of their 11 starters had last names that began with the letter "B" (Bob Baumhower, Bill Barnett, Lyle Blackwood, Kim Bokamper, Glenn Blackwood, Charles Bowser, Doug Betters, and Bob Brudzinski). They allowed only 131 points in the strike-shortened, nine-game regular season.
- The Killer B's: Three members of the Pittsburgh Steelers, consisting of Ben Roethlisberger, Le'Veon Bell, Antonio Brown, and sometimes Chris Boswell. Name was first used during the 2016 NFL season.

=== L ===
- Legion of Boom: The dominant secondary of the Seattle Seahawks, consisting of All-Pro safety tandem Earl Thomas and Kam Chancellor as well as the league's largest set of corners in 6′4″ Pro Bowler Brandon Browner and 6′3″ All-Pro Richard Sherman. The term has come to encompass the entire defense.
- Legion of Zoom: The unstoppable wide receiver corps of the Kansas City Chiefs, particularly known for their speed, consisting of Tyreek Hill, Sammy Watkins, Demarcus Robinson, and Mecole Hardman and notably TE Travis Kelce, starting in 2018 with the arrival of a top quarterback, Patrick Mahomes

=== M ===
- Marty Ball: Coach Marty Schottenheimer's football strategy.
- Miami Pound Machine The nickname of the late 1980s and early '90s Dolphins defense, named for Gloria Estefan's band Miami Sound Machine
- Million Dollar Backfield was given to two historical backfields. It was first used to refer to the backfield of the then–Chicago Cardinals in 1947 after owner Charles Bidwill spent an unprecedented amount of money to lure several of the era's top players to the team. The term was resurrected again in 1954 for the backfield of the San Francisco 49ers, which would go on to produce four Hall of Famers.
- Monsters of the Midway: Originally applied to the Chicago Bears of the early 1940s, but revived for the 1980s Bears and subsequent successful Bears defensive teams. Originally used for the University of Chicago Maroons college football team. "Midway" was the name of the park on campus.

=== N ===
- New Jack City: The New York Jets secondary in the late 2010s and the early 2020s, led by both Jamal Adams and Marcus Maye. It was based on the movie New Jack City which is about robberies in New York City.
- New York Sack Exchange: The New York Jets defense of the early 1980s, led by defensive end Mark Gastineau along with Joe Klecko, and interior linemen Marty Lyons and Abdul Salaam. Fans began showing up at Shea Stadium with "NY Sack Exchange" signs, then the team itself began to promote that moniker. Name references the New York Stock Exchange on New York's Wall Street.
- No-Fly Zone: Mid 2010's Denver Broncos defensive backfield including players Aqib Talib, Chris Harris Jr., TJ Ward, Darian Stewart and Bradley Roby. Helped lead a Broncos dominating defense to Super Bowl 50 victory.
- No-Name Defense: The 1970s Miami Dolphins defensive team, especially that of its undefeated 1972 season, which performed excellently despite a lack of recognizable stars. They earned their nickname the previous year when Dallas coach Tom Landry said in an interview prior to Super Bowl VI that he could not remember the names of the Miami defensive players.

=== O ===
- Orange Crush: The 1970s Denver Broncos defensive team, led by defensive end Lyle Alzado and linebackers Randy Gradishar and Tom Jackson.
- Over-the-Hill Gang: The George Allen–coached Washington Redskins of the early 1970s, so named because of the large number of veteran players on the team. Many of those players also played for Allen when he coached the Los Angeles Rams from 1966–1970.

=== P ===
- Patsies: Poorly performing New England Patriots squads, a play on the nickname "The Pats".
- Purple People Eaters: The 1970s Minnesota Vikings defensive line, specifically the combination of Alan Page, Jim Marshall, Carl Eller, and Gary Larsen. The name is a reference to both the purple uniforms of the Vikings and the 1958 Sheb Wooley song "Purple People Eater."
- Purple Murder: The Baltimore Ravens' color is purple. A group of crows is called a "murder of crows", and Ravens are similar to crows. Technically, a group of Ravens is referred to as an "unkindness of ravens". In addition, Ray Lewis, a longtime member of the Ravens, was implicated in a murder case during his playing career, possibly popularizing the phrase.

=== R ===
- Red Stallions: The Atlanta Falcons; it comes from a 2023 Tennessee Titans social media post where people on Nashville's Broadway guessed the team names of the Titans opponents that season by logo.

=== S ===
- Sack Pack: The defensive line of the Baltimore Colts in the mid-to-late 1970s. The Sack Pack were defensive tackles Joe Ehrmann (#76) and Mike Barnes (#63) and defensive ends Fred Cook (#72) and John Dutton (#78). In 1975, the Sack Pack established itself with 59 sacks. It had 56 the following year and 47 in 1977 before slowing down due to injuries.
- Sacksonville: A portmanteau of the word sack and the city of Jacksonville. "Sacksonville" is used to refer to the Jacksonville Jaguars defense during the 2017 season, which was known to cause a high number of sacks, interceptions, and turnovers.
- San Diego Super Chargers: Nickname given to the San Diego Chargers from its fight song.
- Steel Curtain: Nickname given to the defensive line of the 1970s Pittsburgh Steelers, the backbone of a dominant defense, which was itself giver this moniker. The nickname was a play on the phrase Iron Curtain during the height of the Cold War.
- Sonic and Knuckles: Nickname given to the Detroit Lions' 2020s running back tandem of Jahmyr Gibbs and David Montgomery in reference to the video game characters. Gibbs is referred to as Sonic due to his speed, and Montgomery is Knuckles due to his brute strength.
- Sons of Anarchy: The New York Jets defensive line of the early 2010s consisting of Muhammad Wilkerson, Damon Harrison, and Sheldon Richardson. Alludes to the FX television series of the same name which was highly popular at the time.
- The Succs/Yuccs: Derogatory nickname given to the Tampa Bay Buccaneers due to their reputation as a perennial losing team
- SWAT team: Name of the Cincinnati Bengals' secondary of David Fulcher, Solomon Wilcots, Eric Thomas, and Lewis Billups coached by Defensive Coordinator Dick LeBeau during the 1988 season.

=== T ===
- The Tacks: General name for the Tennessee Titans, alternately, the Flaming Thumbtacks. Based on the shape of the letter T in the logo. Name popularized by Greg Easterbrook in his Tuesday Morning Quarterback blog.
- The Three Amigos: Denver Broncos wide receivers Mark Jackson, Vance Johnson, and Ricky Nattiel. The nickname came from the 1986 movie, "The Three Amigos".
- The Triplets: Troy Aikman, Michael Irvin, and Emmitt Smith, the offensive stars of the 1990s Dallas Cowboys three-time Super Bowl winning teams
- Twenty Thousand Dollar Beauties: The 1919 Hammond Bobcats, one of the high budget teams whose player spending budgets triggered the formation of the NFL. The Bobcats themselves would not survive to the NFL, and its players and investors would be split among the Decatur Staleys (later the Chicago Bears), Hammond Pros and Chicago Tigers.

=== Y ===
- YAC Bros: Nickname for the 2020s 49ers offense, who are known for their high Yards after catch, consisting of offensive stars Christian McCaffrey, Deebo Samuel, Brandon Aiyuk, and George Kittle

== People ==
Nicknames for individual players, coaches and personnel.

Nickname	Player(s)	Description
A-Train	Mike Alstott	How he was as difficult to tackle as a freight train; "A" is a reference to his surname initial
AB , Mr. Big Chest, or Tony-Toe Tap	Antonio Brown	His initials and his alter ego for making catches on the sideline.
Action Jackson	Lamar Jackson	Given to him by teammates during high school because of his dynamic play style that produced highlight-reel worthy clips, from the Carl Weathers film of the same name
Ageless Wonder	Darrell Green	His remarkable ability to maintain a high level of play during the latter years of his 20-year career.
Air McNair	Steve McNair	Originally given to his older brother, McNair earned it due to his impressive throwing talent
Alabama Pitts	Edwin Pitts Jr.	The convict-turned-pro athlete, who briefly played in the NFL in addition to his better-known baseball career, was born in Alabama, in contrast to his father Edwin Sr., who was born in Georgia.
All Day or AD / AP	Adrian Peterson	Given to him by his parents because he would run "all day" / His initials
Amblin' Amby	Ambrose Schindler	Schindler was one of the earliest scrambling quarterbacks. He chose not to play in the NFL despite being selected in the 1940 NFL draft, but would later return to professional football as an official in the 1960s.
Amish Rifle	Ryan Fitzpatrick	Fitzpatrick has regularly grown a thick beard over the course of the football season, drawing comparisons to the Amish, who have a large community south of Buffalo, where he was playing at the time the name was bestowed in 2010.
Anytime	Devin Hester	His ability to return kicks and punts for touchdowns any time. Inspired from his mentor Deion "Prime Time" Sanders.
The Assassin	Jack Tatum	Given for his pure brutality.
Bad Moon Rison	Andre Rison	Given nickname by ESPN's Chris Berman in reference to CCR's song "Bad Moon Rising".
BallSoHard/T Sizzle	Terrell Suggs	Suggs claims that the reason he plays so toughly and aggressively is because he went to BallSoHard University; however, he did admit in an interview during the 2011 NFL season that he got the name from the commonly known lyric in the Jay-Z song "Niggas in Paris", feat. Kanye West.
Ball Hawk	Ed Reed	Reed was always there to make a play on the ball (i.e. pass defense or interception).
Bam Bam	Kam Chancellor	For his devastatingly big hitting ability. Also referred to as 'Kamtrack' and 'Kam Chancellor the Touchdown Canceller'.
Bambi	Lance Alworth	For his speed, and his spectacular and graceful moves.
Bass-O-Matic	Tyler Bass	A play on Bass's name and the Super Bass-O-Matic, a Dan Aykroyd sketch from Saturday Night Live that itself parodied the Veg-O-Matic from Ronco.
Beanie	Chris Wells and Veryl Ebert	
Beast Mode	Marshawn Lynch	He used this term to describe himself during an interview; afterward, fans continued to use the term. Lynch later named his Fan Controlled Football franchise the Beasts in homage to the nickname.
Big Baller Beane	Brandon Beane	Given to him during his time as Bills GM in the 2020s for his popularity with the team's players. The phrase "Big Baller B—" was originally popularized in 2016 by the Big Baller Brand founded by LaVar Ball.
Big Ben	Ben Roethlisberger	His imposing size; a nod to the large Big Ben structure in London.
Big Cat	Leonard Williams	Given to him teammate during his rookie season with the New York Jets for his giant size.
Big Daddy	Dan Wilkinson	His 6′5″, 340 lb frame
Big Daddy	Gene Lipscomb	At 6′9″ and 290 lb, Lipscomb, a professional wrestler during the offseason, was one of the largest players in professional football during the 1950s.
Big Dick Nick	Nick Foles	Connor Barwin once stated that Foles had the largest penis on the Eagles roster. The moniker became more used following Foles' improbable playoff run, culminating in the Eagles' first Super Bowl victory.
Big Game	Torry Holt	Goes back to his college career at North Carolina State when he had great performances in games, such as against No. 2 ranked Florida State. He also set rookie Super Bowl records for receptions and receiving yards in Super Bowl XXXIV .
Big Play Slay	Darius Slay	Nickname given to Darius Slay by Mississippi State defensive coordinator Geoff Collins
Big Snack	Casey Hampton	Apparent reference to his large size and penchant for eating
Black Unicorn	Martellus Bennett	
Blitz Boy	Jamal Adams	His tendency to blitz despite being a safety
Blonde Bomber	Terry Bradshaw	His blond hair, combined with his tendencies to throw the ball down the field, hence "bomber".
Boobie	Anthony Dixon	The nickname comes from Boobie Miles, a character from Friday Night Lights, and was bestowed by his teammates in college.
Brass	Erik Kramer	In his first play from scrimmage for the Detroit Lions, Kramer, the Lions' backup quarterback at the time, audibled out of the originally called play, prompting a teammate to remark about his audacity that he must have "brass balls."
Brickwall	Ray Lewis	Lewis had the ability to hit players very hard and often injured them: many players compared one of Lewis's hits to the feeling of running into a brick wall.
Broadway Joe	Joe Namath	Reference to the wide avenue that ran through New York, the city where he played QB with the New York Jets. An allusion to Broadway theater, Namath was known for his showmanship.
Breece Lightning/Beast	Breece Hall	A play on "Greased Lightnin'," the car in the musical and film Grease
Breesus	Drew Brees	Play on Brees's last name and his perception as the savior of Saints Football.
Brooklyn Bullet	Abraham Barshofsky	The Russian Jewish immigrant spent his childhood in Brooklyn, and also went by the anglicized name "Johnny Barsha."
Buck	Javorius Allen	His high school teammates referred to him as "young buck" as he was a freshman on the varsity team.
Buffalo Joe	Joe Andreessen	Andreessen has spent most of his life in Erie County, New York, playing high school football in Lancaster, college at the University at Buffalo, and signing with the Buffalo Bills as an undrafted free agent.
Bullet Bob	Bob Hayes	Reference to his incredible speed-won two gold medals and set world record in the 100 m at 1964 Summer Olympics.
Bum	Oial "Bum" Phillips	A contraction of "bumblebee," based on his aunt's thick southern accent (common to many others in the Phillips family including his son Wade Phillips and grandson Wes Phillips)
Burner	Michael Turner	Given both because of his ability to break long runs and because it rhymes with his last name. Got the name in college.
The Bus	Jerome Bettis	Because of his ability to carry tacklers on his back like a "bus".
Butch Cassidy and the Sundance Kid	Larry Csonka & Jim Kiick	Miami Dolphins running back duo from 1968 to 1974; named after the movie about the famous outlaws.
Cadillac	Carnell Williams	A high school broadcaster at Etowah High School in Attalla, Alabama compared Williams' running to a luxury car.
Cannonball	Jim Butler	A reflection of his 5'9" physique
Captain Checkdown	Trent Edwards	Name given to quarterback Trent Edwards for his refusal to throw the deep ball, preferring instead to dump off to running backs or tight ends.
Captain Chaos	Chris Cooley	Adapted from Dom DeLuise's character in The Cannonball Run; possibly due to shared initials.
Captain Kirk	Kirk Cousins	Nickname adapted from the Star Trek character James Kirk.
Captain Comeback	Roger Staubach	Name given to quarterback Roger Staubach during his career with the Dallas Cowboys during the 1970s for his ability to bring back his team from being down during important games. Also referred to as Captain America for his strong old fashioned beliefs, likening him to the comic book hero.
Cheetah	Tyreek Hill	Given due to his incredible top speed and acceleration, widely being regarded as one of the fastest NFL players of all time.
Chef Russ, Dangeruss & Mr. Unlimited	Russell Wilson	A name given by fans in 2020 along with the slogan "Let Russ Cook". Another name given by fans for his elusive scrambling ability. Calls himself that cause he's corny at times.
CJ2K	Chris Johnson	Given to him after rushing for over 2,000 yards during the 2009 season.
Concrete Charlie	Chuck Bednarik	Bednarik worked as a concrete salesman during the NFL's offseason and was known for his hard hits and persistent endurance.
The Cowboy	Justin Smith	His Southern accent and his tendency to wear jeans and boots
Crazy Legs	Elroy Hirsch	Named for his unusual running style.
Crystal Chandelier	Chris Chandler	Was plagued by concussions and injuries, referencing his presumed fragility
Danny Dimes	Daniel Jones	Coined by his team's (the New York Giants) social media department, allegedly for his ability to throw a football with precision as narrow as a dime.
David W. Gibson	Joe Montana	A contestant in a San Francisco Chronicle contest to give Montana a nickname noted that Montana's real name sounded too much like a nickname and suggested the realistic-sounding "David W. Gibson" as an alternative. Montana was so amused by the suggestion that he had a placard of the name placed on his locker.
Deebo	James Harrison	His similarity in appearance and demeanor to the character in the movie Friday played by Tom Lister, Jr.
Deebo	Tyshun "Deebo" Samuel	His similarity in appearance and demeanor to the character in the movie Friday played by Tom Lister, Jr.
Diesel	John Riggins	Because of his powerback style of play—compared to a truck that ran on diesel.
Dr. Death	Skip Thomas	Because of his physical tackling, and apparent resemblance to the cartoon character.
Dr. Doom	Robert Brazile	Taken from the cartoon character Doctor Doom because he was "death on offensive men".
Don't Cross The	Arthur Moats	Name bestowed after Moats laid a clean, but particularly devastating hit on Brett Favre, ending Favre's streak of consecutive starts as well as leading to Favre's retirement at the end of the 2010 season. Moats are large trenches surrounding castles that served as a line of defense.
Double Trouble	DeAngelo Williams and Jonathan Stewart	Carolina Panthers running back duo from 2008 to 2014, previously known as Smash and Dash
Dougie Fresh	Doug Pederson	A play on the name Doug E. Fresh. Given to Pederson by Jalen Mills.
Drake "Drake Maye" Maye	Drake Maye	From his team's (the New England Patriots) social media department, reportedly because he was playing so well that his own nickname was enough of an honorific nickname to be repeated as a nickname
Duck	Devlin Hodges	Hodges, in addition to his football playing, is a world-class champion duck caller.
Dump Truck	Najeh Davenport	Allusion to an incident which allegedly occurred when he was in college as well as a take on one-time teammate Jerome Bettis' nickname, "The Bus"
Dwight Hicks and the Hot Licks	1984 San Francisco 49ers defensive secondary led by Dwight Hicks	
Dynamic Uno	David Wilson	His all-around skills at running back
Edge	Edgerrin James	Shortening of his first name
Earth, Wind and Fire	Brandon Jacobs, Derrick Ward, and Ahmad Bradshaw	2008 NY Giants running backs; Jacobs = Earth, Ward = Wind, Bradshaw = Fire
ELIte	Eli Manning	Play on his first name, Eli, and the word Elite. Used by New York Giants fans in reference to quarterback Eli Manning claiming that he considers himself in the same elite class of quarterbacks as Tom Brady during a preseason interview. Manning backed up this claim by beating Brady and the New England Patriots in Super Bowl XLVI
The Enforcer	Kenny Easley	Easley rightfully earned his nickname as “The Enforcer” for this style of play on the field. An all-around great athlete, he earned recognition for his abilities including 5 Pro Bowl selections, 5 total All-Pro selections, AFC Defensive Rookie of the Year honors in 1981, AFC Defensive Player of the Year honors in 1983, NFL 1980s All-Decade Team honors, is in the Seattle Seahawks Ring of Honor and was inducted into the Pro Football Hall of Fame, despite only playing for seven seasons.
Exciting Whites	Cooper DeJean and Reed Blankenship	Using the meme by the same name, Philadelphia Eagles fans began to use a photo of a supermarket wine selection titled "Exciting Whites" to react to outstanding defensive plays by white defenders Cooper DeJean and Reed Blankenship. The duo embraced the trend by wearing custom exciting whites t-shirts into their week 11 matchup of the 2024 season against the Washington Commanders. During the following offseason, Dejean and Blankenship further demonstrated their acceptance of the nickname by starting a podcast titled "Exciting Mics."
The Face Cleaver	Leonard Weaver	
Famous Jameis	Jameis Winston	A nod to Winston's high public profile during his college and professional careers, as well as a play on the Famous Amos cookie brand. Winston has filed for a trademark on the nickname.
Fast Freddie	Jonathan Smith	After Fred Flintstone—specifically, how Smith's choice of quick, short strides when running resembled Flintstone's when operating the Flintmobile.
Fast Willie	Willie Parker	His speed
Fatso	Art Donovan	A reference to his large frame.
Feeva Island	Jason Verrett	During his media session at the combine, Verrett explained that his nickname is Feeva Island because he's "a player that's always hot" like he has a fever and he often plays man-to-man coverage "on an island."
Fitzmagic	Ryan Fitzpatrick	Fitzpatrick has had brief spurts of resounding success, notable examples include when he played with the Buffalo Bills, New York Jets, Tampa Bay Buccaneers, and Miami Dolphins throughout his long career as an NFL journeyman quarterback.
Fitztragic	Ryan Fitzpatrick	Along with those brief spurts of success, Fitzpatrick is also notorious for going on cold streaks and drastrically underperfoming in games for multiple weeks.
Flash 80	Jerry Rice	His stunning plays combined with his number, 80
Flash Gordon	Josh Gordon	After the early 20th century multimedia hero Flash Gordon
The Samoan Headhunter	Troy Polamalu	His style of diving into receivers and diving into pass paths for interception, and for Polamalu's Polynesian ancestry
Fragile Fred	Fred Taylor	Perception of being injured constantly
Fredex	Freddie Mitchell	A play on his first name and FedEx.
The Freezer	B. J. Raji	A play off the nickname of William "The Refrigerator" Perry whom the Bears utilized in a similar manner during the 1980s. "Freezer" also alludes to the Packers home stadium, Lambeau Field, which is known for its freezing temperatures in December and February.
Galloping Ghost	Harold "Red" Grange	
The General / General Lee	Sean Lee	The nickname was given to Lee by Bruce Carter, a former teammate of Lee's on the Dallas Cowboys. Carter says that Lee is always in charge and is a great leader. When he talks, everyone listens — "General Lee." The name is also derived from General Robert E. Lee, a former General during the Civil War. But in no ways is the middle linebacker specifically named after the war general.
GEQBUS	Sam Darnold	Acronym for "God Emperor Quarterback of the United States". Has a subreddit called r/The_Darnold, which is a parody of r/The Donald.
Golden Wheels	Elbert Dubenion	Johnny Green, a backup quarterback on Dubenion's Buffalo Bills, gave Dubenion a backhanded compliment admiring his exceptional speed while claiming he couldn't catch a football: "he's sure got those golden wheels."
Gravedigger	Javon Hargrave	Given to him by his defensive coordinator at South Carolina State after getting his first sack.
Gronk	Rob Gronkowski	Shortening of his last name which is Gronkowski. Also a play off of the Incredible Hulk due to Rob's size, power, and dominance.
Groot	Greg Rousseau	A play on his first initial and last name being similar to the Guardians of the Galaxy character. Rousseau was unfamiliar with the character when the nickname was bestowed but came to like the comparison.
Hausch Money	Steven Hauschka	Pete Carroll, head coach of the Seattle Seahawks, coined the nickname in response to Hauschka's ability to kick field goals in clutch situations. The name was revived, possibly independently, when Hauschka joined the Buffalo Bills and continued to make key field goals, often from long range.
Headhunter	Jackie Wallace	Wallace led with his head frequently during his playing career, a tactic that in hindsight Wallace suspected may have caused brain damage later in life.
He Hate Me	Rod Smart	Self-bestowed nickname Smart used on the back of his jersey during his time in the XFL. Smart credits the nickname with helping him break into the NFL after the XFL folded.
Hollywood	Marquise Brown	Given to him back in college by Oklahoma announcer Gus Johnson back in 2017.
Honey Buns	Ben Cavil	Nickname given to him for his sweet tooth.
Hopalong	Howard Cassady	A play on his last name and famed Western character Bill "Hop-Along" Cassidy.
Horse Whisperer	Ed Oliver	In March 2019, Oliver posted a picture on Twitter of him standing on the back of a horse as a demonstration of his confidence.
The Human Bowling Ball	Don Nottingham	So named for his short but robust frame.
The Human Joystick	Dante Hall	Nickname given to him by coach Vermeil because of his big play ability in the return game.
Iceman	Caleb Williams	Given due to his ability to produce game winning drives in close or comeback games.
Iceman	Carlos Huerta	Bestowed in college, Huerta was renowned for keeping his composure (staying cool) in stressful situations.
If-Man	Justin Herbert	Used to refer to the endless hypotheticals used by Herbert's supporters to explain his struggles.
Intellectual Assassin	Ron Mix	Mix had a degree in law at the time he played professional football.
Iron Head	Craig Heyward	Heyward had an unusually large head, which he often used as a battering ram.
Jake the Snake	Jake Plummer	An homage to Ken Stabler. Both Stabler and Plummer were known for their scrambling abilities; plumber's snakes are augers designed to be able to navigate pipes with curved paths. Similarity in nickname to professional wrestler Jake "The Snake" Roberts, who also took his ring name from Stabler, is coincidental.
Jjettas	Justin Jefferson	Jefferson's Twitter and Instagram usernames.
Jock Strap King & Minshew Mania	Gardner Minshew	Given to him by Leonard Fournette from having a habit of doing jock strap-only exercises. A name given to him by fans for his impressive season in 2019 & 2020.
Joe Shiesty and Joe Brr	Joe Burrow	Given to him in a viral TikTok by user TrapHouse Sports. Reasons for the nickname are unknown.
Johnny Blood	John McNally	Inspired by the film Blood and Sand, McNally took the first name to hide his identity while he first went professional, hoping someday to return to college football (he never did).
Juice	Kyle Juszczyk	Based on his last name.
The Juice	O. J. Simpson	A play on the initials he had used as his de facto first name since infancy, a common abbreviation for orange juice.
K-9	Kenneth Walker III	Called "K9" because he wears jersey number 9 and embodies the tenacious, "dawg" mentality of a Spartan (Michigan State) or a "beast" (Seahawks), with the nickname combining his number ("K-9") and his fierce running style, similar to a police dog.
Kansas Comet	Gale Sayers	"Kansas Comet" was stuck on him by the Director of Sports Information at the University of Kansas.
KermitShowtime The Grim Reaper	Patrick Mahomes	"Kermit" based on his voice sounding similar to Kermit the Frog. "Grim Reaper" based upon a speech Mahomes's coach Andy Reid made in a 2022 playoff game: "when it's grim, be the Grim Reaper."
The Kitchen	Nate Newton	Since he was presumably larger than "William "Refrigerator" Perry"
King Henry	Derrick Henry	His height (6 ft 3 in) and imposing stature.
The King	Jim Corcoran	A journeyman quarterback whose NFL career was quite brief, Corcoran earned a reputation for pomposity in high school when, coming onto the field in a clean uniform after a rainstorm, he drew a cheer of "hail to the King!" from a spectator.
The King	Hugh McElhenny	Because he was "the most feared running back in the NFL."
King of Spring	Luis Perez	Perez has played seven consecutive seasons of professional spring football: 2019 in the AAF, 2020 in the XFL, 2021 in The Spring League, 2022 in the USFL, 2023 in the XFL and since 2024 in the UFL, appearing in three league championships from 2021 to 2023 and winning the 2023 XFL title. His NFL experience has been limited to preseason games up to 2025. Perez named his autobiography The Spring King.
Law Firm	BenJarvus Green-Ellis	Play on the length of his full name and its resemblance to the name of a law firm
M-80	Malcom Floyd	His first initial and jersey number combined, also for his deep play ability.
Machine Gun Kelly	Jim Kelly	Jim Kelly was perhaps best known for running the Bills' "No-Huddle Offense", which was fast-paced and denied opposing defenses the opportunity to make timely substitutions, establishing the Buffalo Bills as one of the NFL's most successful and dangerous offenses. A reference to mobster Machine Gun Kelly.
The Mad Bomber	Daryle Lamonica	Lamonica tended to throw, or "bomb", the ball deep during unnecessary situations.
Mad Duck	Alex Karras	Because of his short legs, he appeared to waddle like a duck.
Mad Maxx & The Condor	Maxx Crosby	Given to him in college for being fueled by relentless anger & motivation. A name given to him football analyst Brian Baldinger for his unusually large wingspan & his pursuit on quarterbacks.
The Mad Stork	Ted Hendricks	While playing for the University of Miami, the tall, thin Hendricks gained the nickname “The Mad Stork.”
Majik (Man)	Don Majkowski	A play on the quarterback's unwieldy Polish surname.
Marion the Barbarian	Marion Barber III	Because of his physical running style and reputation for repeatedly breaking tackles
Marks Brothers	Mark Clayton and Mark Duper	Prolific Miami Dolphins wide receiver duo of the 1980s who shared the same first name (also a reference to the Marx Brothers. They were also christened "Mark Twain.")
Maserati Marv	Marvin Harrison Jr.	Given to him by Gus Johnson for being one of the fastest receivers in recent memory.
Matty Ice	Matt Ryan	In reference to Matt Ryan's ability to have long game-winning drives under pressure (and pejoratively for Ryan's tendency to go "ice cold" during playoff games); also a play on "Natty Ice", a low-end beer brewed by Anheuser-Busch InBev
MCDC	Dan Campbell	Stands For "Motor City Dan Campbell"
Mean Joe Greene	Joe Greene	Greene never cared for the nickname
Megatron	Calvin Johnson	A reference to his large frame, comparing him to a Transformers character
Minitron	Julian Edelman	While not many would draw comparisons between the diminutive Julian Edelman and the monstrous Calvin Johnson, Tom Brady did just that by giving Edelman a new nickname: "Minitron"
Mongo	Steve McMichael	Taken from the character in the film Blazing Saddles, played by Alex Karras.
Mooney Ward	Charvarius Ward	Given to him in reference to his big-time corner play
Moose	Daryl Johnston	Given to him by Cowboys backup quarterback Babe Laufenberg for his blocking ability and opening holes for runningback Emmitt Smith.
Mormon Missile	Taysom Hill	The utility player is a member of the Church of Jesus Christ of Latter-day Saints.
Mount Washington	Darnell Washington	A reference to both his large size, stature, and brute strength, comparing it to that of a mountain. The nickname also alludes to the mountain and neighborhood bearing the Mount Washington name in Pittsburgh.
Mr. Relevant	Brock Purdy	Picked as the final player in the 2022 NFL draft and showed immediate success afterwards.
Mudbone	Dave Krieg	Krieg long kept the origin of his nickname, "Mudbone", a secret. Jim Zorn outed him. His nickname was nominated by teammates Byron "Bones" Walker and Bryan Millard, and overwhelmingly voted in by his team. The name comes from the Richard Pryor character Mudbone. He was also nicknamed “The Man From Milton” because he went to Milton College which no longer existed by the time he was a starting NFL QB.
Muscle Hamster	Doug Martin	Originally the nickname of his college girlfriend who was a short but powerful gymnast and later became Martin's nickname as well due to his short stature.
Night Train	Dick "Night Train" Lane	From the Jimmy Forrest record "Night Train," which Lane enjoyed.
Nino	Quandre Diggs	Originally the nickname he got from his teammates back in college.
Ocho Cinco	Chad Johnson	Self-bestowed pidgin Spanish reference to his uniform number (85); originally named Chad Johnson, legally changed name to "Chad Ochocinco" in 2008 (changed back to Johnson in 2012). Also self-refers as "Esteban Ochocinco".
One Man Gang	Lorenzo Alexander	During his early career, Alexander played multiple offensive and defensive positions.
Pacman	Adam Jones	Bestowed in childhood by his grandmother, who surmised he changed directions more often than the popular arcade game character.
Papa Bear	George Halas	The founding father of the Chicago Bears
Passing Paisano	Tommy DeVito	Nod to his Italian-American Heritage
Passtronaut	Josh Dobbs	In addition to being an NFL Quarterback, Dobbs double majored in aerospace engineering while playing for the University of Tennessee Volunteers
Pinball	Michael Clemons	The punt returner had a scattershot running style akin to a pinball. Though his NFL career lasted only one season, he achieved much greater fame in the Canadian Football League.
The Playmaker	Michael Irvin	For his ability to defeat tight coverage, even double coverage, and make big plays.; possibly self-bestowed
Pooh Bear	Clarence Williams	Bestowed by his grandmother due to a childhood resemblance to Winnie-the-Pooh.
Poop	Cory Johnson	Johnson once joked that his often fluctuating weight was due to his frequent defecation.
Posse	Art Monk, Gary Clark and Ricky Sanders	Trio of wide receivers on the Washington Redskins of the late 1980s through the early 1990s:
President & Blitz Boy	Jamal Adams	His passion, intelligence, and vocal leadership: self-bestowed; blitzes quarterbacks way too much
Presto Podesto from Modesto	Johnny Podesto	His last name and place of birth.
Prime Time	Deion Sanders	His ability to step up at critical moments and make big plays; possibly self-bestowed
The Prince that was Promised	Trevor Lawrence	His generational talent as an NFL prospect
Punt God	Matt Araiza	His punting power
Quiet Storm	Marques Colston	Reference to Colston's shyness and ability to make big plays.
Quinyonamo Bay	Quinyon Mitchell	Suggested by Eagles fans as a reference to the United States Naval base located in Guantanamo Bay, Cuba.
The Refrigerator / The Fridge	William Perry	His immense size in comparison to other defensive linemen
Red Rifle	Andy Dalton	His ability to throw the ball downfield and his red hair.
Revis Island	Darrelle Revis	His ability to cover wide receivers was compared to being stranded on an island
Rez Dawg / Y.A.C. and Cheese	Tucker Kraft	Grew up on an Indian Reservation in rural South Dakota. A play on Kraft Mac and Cheese and his impressive ability to gain Yards After Catch.
Riverboat Ron	Ron Rivera	His aggressive nature in playcalling
Sauce	Ahmad Gardner	Given to him by one of his youth coaches and originally called "A1 Sauce Sweet Feet Gardner", which was then later shortened.
Sausage	Anthony Sherman	Given to him by Kansas City Chiefs play-by-play announcer Mitch Holthus.
Scary Terry	Terry McLaurin	Given to him by teammates for his fast playmaking abilities.
Shady	LeSean McCoy	His mother gave him the nickname as he had many mood changes when he was young.
The Sheriff	Peyton Manning	Well known for calling his own plays at the line of scrimmage and hurry-up offense.
Shipwreck	John Simms Kelly	A nod to famed pole-sitter Alvin Kelly, also popularly nicknamed "Shipwreck."
Shnowman	Dion Dawkins	Dawkins coined the word "shnow"—a contraction of "should know"—that quickly became associated with him when he first used it in high school.
Silverback	Trent Williams	Their strength, which is likened to that of a silverback gorilla
Silverback	James Harrison	Their strength, which is likened to that of a silverback gorilla
Sixty Minute Man	Chuck Bednarik	Playing on both offense and defense (and thus playing all sixty minutes of the game); is sometimes applied generally to any player that does this. Bednarik is generally recognized as the last to have done so.
Slant Boy	Michael Thomas	His tendency to run slant routes
Smash and Dash	Chris Johnson & LenDale White	Running back duo of the Titans starting in 2008; White being Smash for his 'power running back' skills and Johnson being Dash because of his astonishing breakaway speed
Smith Brothers or Smith Bros	Preston Smith and Za'Darius Smith	Former Green Bay Packers linebacker duo who shared the same last name.
Smokey	John Brown	Brown had jet black skin at birth, leading his grandmother to nickname him "Smokey."
Snacks, Big Snacks	Damon Harrison	Based on his refusal to eat Rice Krispie Treats left for him by the coaching staff
Snake	Ken Stabler	Both for his scrambling abilities and his ability to escape criminal charges for his wild off-field antics.
Snoop	Tyler Huntley	Given to him by one of his coaches in high school for his resemblance of Snoop Dogg.
Spiderman	Joe Webb	Drafted as a wide receiver by the Minnesota Vikings, on Brett Favre's insistence Joe Webb was signed to the team as a back-up QB. Went on to lead Vikings to a win in Philadelphia, against Michael Vick and the Eagles playing a must-win game. Lovingly called Spiderman, due to his last name.
Stink	Mark Schlereth	A nickname coined by his teammates on the Washington Redskins after peeing himself constantly during his career.
Superman Cam	Cam Newton	Due to both his unusually athletic physique and habit of pretending to rip open his jersey to reveal a "S" underneath when scoring a rushing touchdown.
Swag Kelly	Chad Kelly	Kelly released a rap song about himself in 2012, and the nickname stuck afterwards.
Sweet Feet	James White	A nickname that carried on from high school to the pros due to his quickness while running the ball.
Sweetness	Walter Payton	Earned in college at Jackson State University for his slick moves on the field, his amazing dancing skills, and his friendly personality.
The GOAT	Tom Brady	A name given by fans for being the best QB in NFL history. Short for "The Greatest Of All Time".
The Kid	Jared Goff	Often referred to by fans and anchors as "a" or "the" kid because of his facial young look to him.
The Terminator	Aaron Donald	A name given by Rams' head coach Sean McVay due to his ability to terrorize opposing offenses.
Thiccer Kicker	Harrison Mevis	His stout frame.
Thunder and Lightning	Chuck Muncie and Tony Galbreath	1976–1980 New Orleans Saints dynamic running back duo known as "Thunder and Lightning". The nickname is credited to former Saints Head Coach Hank Stram.
Tommy	E. F. Hughitt	The origin of this early NFL star's nickname remains unknown. It was popular enough that he legally changed his name to Tommy after his playing career ended.
Tommy Cutlets	Tommy DeVito	His parents, with whom DeVito still resides as of his rookie professional season, regularly serve chicken cutlets for dinner.
Too Tall	Ed Jones	His tall height
Touchdown Jesus	Jake Kumerow	Nickname given due to his long hair and thick beard resembling a common depiction of Jesus
Toughie	Frank Stojack	Nickname given for never having been hurt on the field throughout his collegiate career and first year in the NFL.
Tuel Time	Jeff Tuel	A play on the show-within-a-show Tool Time on the 1990s sitcom Home Improvement.
Tuffy	Alfonse Leemans	Nickname adopted due to softness of his given name, Alfonse.
Tuna	Bill Parcells	Bestowed in 1980, well after his (very brief) NFL playing career ended, when Parcells was an assistant with the New England Patriots, as an homage to the advertising icon Charlie the Tuna.
Two Point Tupa	Tom Tupa	Tupa took advantage of the legalization of the two-point conversion in the 1994 NFL season; as holder on extra points, he picked the ball up and ran for the conversion three times that season, the first NFL player to score that way.
Uncle Rico	Kyle Orton	Orton bore a resemblance to Uncle Rico, a washed-up former high school backup quarterback in the movie Napoleon Dynamite, especially during his time with the Buffalo Bills. Prior to his signing with the Bills, he earned the nickname Neckbeard for his facial hair.
Weapon X	Brian Dawkins	Over the span of his career, Dawkins developed a reputation as a ball-hawking safety and became the unquestioned leader of the Philadelphia Eagles' defense. He earned the nickname "Weapon X," a codename of Marvel character Wolverine, the comic book superhero known for relentless aggression.
The Wheaton Iceman	Harold "Red" Grange	A part-time job he once held delivering ice in his hometown of Wheaton, Illinois
Whizzer	Byron White	An alliterative play on his last name and his speed; White, who led the league in rushing in his short three-year NFL career, was dismayed to find the nickname stuck with him well into his legal career (eventually ending up a Supreme Court Justice).
Wildman	Ray Nitschke and Norm Willey	
Williams Wall	Pat Williams & Kevin Williams	The duo is largely responsible for the Vikings fielding such a stiff run defense, and they make it nearly impossible for the opposition to consistently gain yardage between the tackles.
Windy City Flyer	Devin Hester	Hester's speed and a nickname for the city of Chicago, in which he plays; bestowed by WBBM 780 radio-announcer Jeff Joniak
Wink	Don Martindale	Martindale shares a last name with media personality Winston "Wink" Martindale.
Winter Soldier	Josh Allen	NFL Films gave Allen the nickname in reference to his strong arm, imposing size, and Buffalo's cold weather. The "Winter Soldier" name also refers to the Marvel Cinematic Universe character Bucky Barnes and his strong prosthetic arm.
WD40	Mike Alstott and Warrick Dunn	For Dunn's initials and Alstott's jersey No. 40, a play on the proprietary lubricant of the same name.
X Factor	Dante Hall	Hall's prolific special teams success during his prime was an "X factor," a facet of his team's attack plan that most other teams did not have. In acknowledgement of his nickname, he would make an X gesture with his arms during his touchdown celebrations.
Yoda	Steve Largent	Teammates dubbed him "Yoda" to highlight his precision, technical mastery, and ability to "channel" the ball, functioning as a "Jedi Master" on the field.
Zeus	Travis Kelce	
The Predator	John Abraham	
The Windbreaker	Jacoby Windmon	A play on his last name, given by fans for his hard-hitting ability and defensive presence.

== Places ==
- Big Sombrero: Nickname given to Tampa Stadium, first home of the Tampa Bay Buccaneers, so named because of its curved outline that resembled the brim of a sombrero. Raymond James Stadium, the Buccaneers' home since 1998, was christened The New Sombrero by ESPN anchor Chris Berman.
- Black Hole: Name of the section behind the south end zone at Oakland Coliseum, former home of the Las Vegas Raiders, known for having some of the most rabid fans in the NFL. No equivalent exists in Las Vegas's Allegiant Stadium since it eventually opened to the public.
- Dawg Pound: Name of the bleacher section behind the east end zone in Cleveland Browns Stadium, also known for having one of the most loyal fans in the NFL. The name was originally applied to the same section of Cleveland Municipal Stadium, which formerly stood on the site.
- The Death Star: Nickname for Allegiant Stadium, the home stadium for the Las Vegas Raiders, in Paradise, Nevada due to its resemblance to the fictional space station from Star Wars.
- The Factory of Sadness: Cleveland Browns Stadium, home of the Cleveland Browns. Coined in a YouTube video by comedian Mike Polk Jr. after a Browns loss in 2011. The nickname is additionally used as the name of a Browns fan site
- Frozen Tundra (of Lambeau Field): Nickname given to the home field of the Green Bay Packers. The phrase was allegedly first uttered by NFL Films narrator John Facenda as he described the 1967 NFL Championship Game, or "Ice Bowl", during which Lambeau's undersoil heating system failed and the field froze. However, Steve Sabol of NFL Films denies that Facenda used the phrase; it is thought that an impersonation of Facenda by Chris Berman popularized the phrase. Without a heating system, the severe winter climate of Green Bay, Wisconsin would frequently cause the field to freeze.
- House of Pain: the Houston Astrodome during NFL games played by the Houston Oilers. This was during the days that Warren Moon was the quarterback, and the Oilers defense was a force to be reckoned with, particularly during the Jerry Glanville years.
- Jerry World: Nickname for AT&T Stadium, home of the Dallas Cowboys, after team owner Jerry Jones. The nickname was given to the stadium because of its cavernous nature.
- The Jungle: Home of the Cincinnati Bengals, Paycor Stadium (Previously called Paul Brown Stadium). This nickname carried over from their previous home, Riverfront Stadium.
- The Pit: New Highmark Stadium, so named because of its partially below-ground construction. During early stages of construction, several instances of Bills fans illegally trespassing in the bowl led to jokes of "feeding the pit" as a ritual sacrifice to ensure the Bills' success.
- Razor: New England Patriots stadium Gillette Stadium.
- Rockpile: War Memorial Stadium, so named for its decrepitude by the time the Bills began playing there; this led to it being replaced with the later Rich / Ralph Wilson Stadium, which named a seating section after the old venue.
- The Roomba: Allegiant Stadium, so nicknamed because of its resemblance to a Roomba automated vacuum cleaner.
- 700 Level: The notorious upper levels of the former Veterans Stadium in Philadelphia between 1971 and 2002. This section was infamous for brawls between Philadelphia Eagles fans and those of visiting teams, especially Dallas Cowboys fans.
- Titletown: Referring to both the city of Green Bay, Wisconsin and the 13-time NFL champion Packers teams, including those of legendary coaches Vince Lombardi and Curly Lambeau.

== Fans ==
- The 12th Man/The 12's: Nickname given to the fans of the Seattle Seahawks because of the impact of their loud cheering on the opposing team's offensive linemen, leading to false start penalties. Since 1990, the Seahawks have had to pay licensing fees to Texas A&M University at College Station, because of the college filing a trademark on the phrase that year. Used to a lesser extent by the Buffalo Bills, also under license.
- 49er Faithful: Longtime fans of the San Francisco 49ers as they have been widely known to travel to numerous team away games in support.
- Bills Mafia: A term for the broad community of Buffalo Bills fans, players, coaches and alumni. Prior to the 2010s, Bills fans were officially known as Bills Backers. "Bills Mafia" originated among a group of Bills fans on Twitter circa 2010 and grew in popularity over the decade.
- Bills Elvis: Entertainer and Elvis impersonator John R. Lang, who appears with a large white guitar that he uses as a billboard. He is one of the Bills' most recognizable individual fans and appears regularly in NFL Films productions.
- Black Hole: Las Vegas Raiders fans who formerly sat in a section of the Oakland Coliseum known as the 'black hole' (sections 104, 105, 106, and 107) which is mostly occupied by rowdy fans when the team played in Oakland.
- Boo Birds: Philadelphia Eagles Though used by other teams as well, largely refers to Philadelphia Eagles fans who are known for their tendency to boo for almost any reason and especially at their own team when the Eagles are performing poorly.
- Browns Backers: The fan club for the Cleveland Browns that has over 100,000 members
- Cheeseheads: A name given to people of Wisconsin (mainly Green Bay Packers fans) by Chicago Bears fans after the Bears won the Super Bowl. The name mocks Wisconsin's love of cheese. The name eventually gained acceptance.
- Chiefs Kingdom: Fans of the Kansas City Chiefs.
- ChiefsAholic: Fan known on social media for very frequent attendance at Kansas City Chiefs games, wearing a gray wolf suit and Chiefs gear. Ahead of the 2024 season, he was convicted of multiple counts of armed bank robbery and imprisoned.
- Chief Zee: Fan who attended nearly all Washington Redskins games from 1978 to 2016 and was considered the unofficial mascot of the team. He wore an Indian headdress, large rimmed glasses, with a red jacket and carried a tomahawk.
- Fireman Ed: Fan at NY Jets home games who wore a green fireman helmet with a Jets logo on the front. Known for leading the "J-E-T-S" chants. He retired the "Fireman Ed" character immediately after the infamous Butt Fumble game, although he still attends games.
- Flameheads: Fans of the Tennessee Titans wear hats made to look like flames. In Greek Mythology, fire was invented by Prometheus, who was a Titan.
- Franco's Italian Army: Fans of Pittsburgh Steelers running back Franco Harris.
- Gerela's Gorillas: Fans of Pittsburgh Steelers placekicker Roy Gerela.
- Hogettes: A group of about twelve Washington Redskins fans who dress in drag and wear pig-noses. The name is a takeoff of the Redskins' "Hogs" offensive line.
- License Plate Guy: New York Giants superfan Joe Ruback, who is known for attending Giants games wearing license plates and Giants apparel. He is famous for having attended all 283 games (272 regular season and 11 playoff) played in the history of Giants Stadium.
- Mobsquad: Was a nickname given to the Los Angeles Rams from their final season in St. Louis until 2018; following their return to Los Angeles. Though officially discontinued by the team after the 2018 season, the name currently refers to a majority of the Rams fans in Los Angeles.
- Never Miss a Super Bowl Club: An exclusive group, who have attended every Super Bowl game to date.
- Pancho Billa: Ezra Castro (1979–2019), a Texas-based Buffalo Bills superfan with a trademark lucha mask whose unsuccessful fight against cancer earned him fame and an appearance at the 2018 NFL draft.
- Pinto Ron: Ken Johnson, a well-known fan of the Buffalo Bills known for appearing at all the Bills' home and away games, his bushy beard, his tailgating on a 1980 Ford Pinto (hence his name), and the infamous practice of serving shots of liquor out of a bowling ball, a practice that the league has since banned.
- Raider Nation: Las Vegas Raiders fans. The first team in the NFL to be characterized as a "nation". The rest of the teams quickly adopted the title and therefore coined a variety of various team "nations".
- Ravens Flock: the Baltimore Ravens fan base.
- Red Sea: Fans of the Arizona Cardinals
- Steeler Nation: Fans of the Pittsburgh Steelers.
- SuperSkin: Die-hard Superfan of the Washington Redskins, who has attended each home game at FedEx Field since 1999 dressed in a burgundy and gold superhero costume while motivating other fans to cheer loudly.
- Who Dat Nation: New Orleans Saints fans.

== Games ==
Throughout NFL history, many significant games have been given nicknames.

- The Ice Bowl was the 1967 NFL Championship Game between The Green Bay Packers and The Dallas Cowboys. The game was played in Lambeau Field and experienced temperatures of -15°F with a Wind Chill of -48°F, making it the coldest game in NFL history. The Packers won 21-17 with a last-second quarterback sneak by Bart Starr.
- The Fog Bowl was played in 1988 between the Chicago Bears and the Philadelphia Eagles. It was a NFC Divisional playoff game that was noted for dense fog at Soldier Field during the second quarter, significantly reducing visibility for players, coaches, and fans. The Bears defeated the Eagles 20-12.
- The Comeback, also called the choke, was a 1993 Playoff-game between The Houston Oilers and The Buffalo Bills, played in Rich Stadium on January 3, 1993. Despite going down 35-3 to the visiting Oilerers, the Bills went on to defeat the Oilers 41-38 in overtime. This remains the largest comeback in NFL post-season history and the second-largest overall. This is also the first time an NFL team lost a game with at least a 30 point lead.
- The Mud Bowl is used to refer to several games with muddy conditions, most notably the 1977–78 NFL playoffs where The Minnesota Vikings defeated The Los Angeles Rams 14-7, The 1983 AFC Championship Game between The Miami Dolphins defeated The New York Jets 14-0, The 1997 Divisional Round, when The Green Bay Packers defeated The San Francisco 49ers 35-14, and The 2007 regular season matchup, where The Pittsburgh Steelers defeated The Miami Dolphins 3-0.

== Rules named after NFL figures ==
Throughout the league's history, a number of rules have been enacted largely because of exploits on the field by a single coach, owner, player, or referee. The following is a partial list of such rule changes:

- Bert Emanuel rule: The ball may touch the ground during a completed pass as long as the receiver maintains control of the ball. Enacted in 2000 due to a play in the 1999 NFC championship game, where Emanuel, playing for the Tampa Bay Buccaneers, had a catch ruled incomplete since the ball touched the ground.
- Bill Belichick rule: Two defensive players, one primary and one backup, will have a radio device in their helmets allowing the head coach to communicate with them through the radio headset, identical to the radio device inside the helmet of the quarterback. This proposal was defeated in previous years, but was finally enacted in 2008 as a result of Spygate.
- Brian Bosworth rule: Linebackers are allowed to wear jersey numbers between 40 and 49. Named for Bosworth, who unsuccessfully sued the NFL, and had himself listed as a safety, to be allowed to wear the number 44 as a linebacker, the rule was passed long after Bosworth's retirement.
- Bronko Nagurski rule: Enacted in 1933, forward passing became legal from anywhere behind the line of scrimmage. Enacted in response to a controversial call in the 1932 NFL Playoff Game, in which Nagurski completed a two-yard pass to Red Grange for the Chicago Bears' winning touchdown. The rule at the time mandated that a forward pass had to be thrown from at least five yards behind the line of scrimmage. Nagurski appeared to have not dropped back five yards before passing to Grange, but the touchdown stood.
- Calvin Johnson rule: A receiver must maintain possession of the football throughout the completion of the play. This was more precisely a clarification of the existing rules regarding catches, made in 2010 in response to a play by Calvin Johnson, who made a falling catch in the end zone, and placed the ball on the ground soon after he hit the ground and before standing up. This was ruled incomplete upon review, and upheld, though it generated discussion about what constituted a catch.
- Kam Chancellor/Bobby Wagner rule: Defensive players are now prohibited from running toward the line of scrimmage and leaping or hurdling over offensive linemen on field goal or PAT attempts.
- Deacon Jones rule: No head-slapping. Enacted in 1977 in response to the defensive end's frequently used technique against opponents.
- Deion Sanders rule: Player salary rule which correlates a contract's signing bonus with its yearly salary. Enacted after Sanders signed with the Dallas Cowboys in 1995 for a minimum salary and a $13 million signing bonus. (There is also a college football rule with this nickname.)
- Ed Hochuli rule: Instant replay can be used to determine whether a loose ball from a passer is definitely a fumble or an incomplete pass. This was enacted in 2009 in response to a play in the San Diego Chargers – Denver Broncos Week 2 regular season game where, in the final minutes, referee Ed Hochuli ruled that Broncos quarterback Jay Cutler threw an incomplete pass. Replays clearly showed it was a fumble, but the play was previously not reviewable.
- Emmitt Smith rule: A player cannot remove his helmet while on the field of play, except in the case of obvious medical difficulty. A violation is treated as unsportsmanlike conduct. Enacted in 1997. The Dallas Cowboys running back was the most high-profile player who celebrated in this manner immediately after scoring a touchdown.
- Fran Tarkenton rule: A line judge was added as the sixth official to ensure that a back was indeed behind the line of scrimmage before throwing a forward pass. Enacted in 1965 in response to Tarkenton, who frequently scrambled around in the backfield from one side to the other.
- Greg Pruitt rule: Tear-away jerseys became illegal starting in 1979. Pruitt purposely wore flimsy jerseys that ripped apart in the hands of would-be tacklers. Such a jersey was most infamously seen in a 1978 game between the Rams and Oilers in which Earl Campbell's jersey ripped apart after several missed tackles.
- Hines Ward rule: The blocking rule makes illegal a blindside block if it comes from the blocker's helmet, forearm or shoulder and lands to the head or neck area of the defender. Enacted in 2009 after the Pittsburgh Steelers receiver broke Cincinnati linebacker Keith Rivers's jaw while making such a block during the previous season.
- Jerome Bettis rule: Enacted in 1999, the rule states all calls for coin flips will occur before the referee tosses the coin into the air, and at least two officials will be present during the coin toss. This is in response to a call considered one of the "worst in history." In a Thanksgiving Day game with the Detroit Lions on November 26, 1998, Bettis was sent as the Steelers' representative for the overtime coin toss. Bettis appeared to call "tails" while the coin was in the air, but referee Phil Luckett declared Bettis called "heads" and awarded possession to Detroit, which went on to win the game before Pittsburgh had a chance to have possession.
- Jim Schwartz rule: Modifying the "no-challenge" rule adopted prior to the 2012 season to eliminate the automatic "no-review" penalty when a coach challenges a play that is subject to automatic review by the replay booth (turnovers, scoring plays, and any play inside of the two-minute warning). This change was prompted after the 2012 Thanksgiving Day game when Detroit Lions' head coach Jim Schwartz threw a challenge flag on a play where replay clearly showed Houston Texans' running back Justin Forsett's knee touched the ground, but was able to get up and score a touchdown. Due to the way the rule was written at the time the penalty for the errant challenge prevented the play from being reviewed. Under the revised rule teams will be charged a time-out (or an unsportsmanlike conduct penalty if the team is out of time-outs) when a coach throws a challenge flag on a booth-reviewable play, but the play will still be reviewed if the replay booth believes a review is necessary.
- Josh Allen Rule: The NFL’s 2022 overtime rule change is often attributed to Josh Allen, as the rule was changed after a heartbreaking overtime loss in which the Kansas City Chiefs were able to score a field goal with 13 seconds remaining on the clock, ultimately winning the game in overtime. Previously, the rule operated under a sudden death system, in which the first score by either team would win the game. Possession was chosen by a coin flip, the same as kick-off. Due to the inherent randomness involved in the coin flip, teams complained about its fairness and the rule was changed to allow both teams an opportunity to score.
- Ken Stabler/Dave Casper rule: On fourth down at any time in the game or any down in the final two minutes of a half, if a player on the offensive team fumbles, only the fumbling player can recover and/or advance the ball. If that player's teammate recovers the ball, it is placed back at the spot of the fumble unless it is recovered for a loss, which places the ball at the spot of the recovery. However, a defensive player can recover and advance at any time of play. Enacted in 1979 in response to the 1978 "Holy Roller" play that resulted in a last-minute game-winning touchdown over San Diego, in which Oakland Raiders quarterback Stabler fumbled the ball forward, and tight end Dave Casper eventually performed a soccer-like dribble before falling on it in the end zone.
- Lester Hayes rule: No Stickum allowed. Enacted in 1981 in response to the Oakland Raiders defensive back, who used the sticky substance to improve his grip.
- Lou Groza rule: No artificial medium to assist in the execution of a kick. Enacted in 1956 in response to Groza, who used tape and later a special tee with a long tail to help him guide his foot to the center spot of the football.
- Mel Blount rule: Officially known as illegal contact downfield, defensive backs can only make contact with receivers within five yards of the line of scrimmage. Enacted in its current form in 1978. While playing for the Pittsburgh Steelers, defensive back Blount frequently used physical play against receivers he was covering.
- Mel Renfro rule: Allows a second player on the offense to catch a tipped ball, without a defender subsequently touching it. Enacted in 1978. One of the first high-profile "victims" of the old rule was Dallas Cowboys defensive back Renfro in Super Bowl V; his tip of a pass allowed the Baltimore Colts' John Mackey to legally catch the ball and run in for a 75-yard touchdown.
- NaVorro Bowman rule: Enacted in 2014, this rule subjects plays in which a loose ball has been recovered to instant replay. Named for Bowman, who during an incident in the previous season's NFC Championship Game recovered a fumble after the officials had blown the play dead.
- Neil Smith rule: Prevents a defensive lineman from flinching to induce a false start penalty on the offense. Enacted in 1998. Smith had frequently used that technique while playing for both the Kansas City Chiefs and the Denver Broncos.
- Odell Beckham Jr. rule: Any player who accumulates two unsportsmanlike conduct penalties in a game is automatically ejected. The original draft of the proposed rule would have counted any two personal fouls toward ejection and drew its name from Beckham, who committed three personal fouls during a game in the 2015 season. The rule, as enacted for 2016, would not have applied to Beckham.
- Phil Dawson rule: Certain field goals can be reviewed by instant replay, including kicks that bounce off the uprights. Under the previous system, no field goals could be replayed. Enacted in 2008 in response to an unusual field goal by the Cleveland Browns kicker in a 2007 game against Baltimore: the ball hit the left upright, then hit the rear curved post (stanchion), then carried again over the crossbar, and landed in the end zone in front of the goalpost. It was initially ruled by the officials as "no good", but was reversed "upon discussion".
- Red Grange rule: Prohibits college football players from signing with NFL teams until after their college class had graduated and from playing both college football and in the NFL in the same season. The rule was enacted after Red Grange and Ernie Nevers joined the Chicago Bears and Duluth Eskimos, respectively, immediately after their final college football games in 1925.
- Ricky (Williams) rule: Rule declared that hair could not be used to block part of the uniform from a tackler and, therefore, an opposing player could be tackled by his hair. Enacted in 2003. Rule was so-named after running back Williams' long dread-locks.
- (Dan) Rooney Rule: Requires teams to interview minority candidates for a head coaching opportunity. Enacted in 2003. Pittsburgh Steelers owner Rooney was a major proponent of such a change.
- Roy Williams rule: No horse-collar tackles. Enacted in 2005 after the Dallas Cowboys safety broke Terrell Owens's ankle and Musa Smith's leg on horse-collar tackles during the previous season.
- (Paul) Salata rule: A team is not allowed to pass on a draft pick at the end of the draft in an effort to secure the last pick. Named after Paul Salata, who many years after his playing career established the Mr. Irrelevant ceremony; it became so popular that in the 1979 NFL draft, the two teams with the last selections repeatedly passed to each other hoping the other would pick and they would get the Mr. Irrelevant publicity, necessitating the rule change.
- Shawne Merriman rule: Bans any player from playing in the Pro Bowl if he tests positive for using a performance-enhancing drug during that season. Enacted in 2007 after the San Diego Chargers linebacker played at the 2007 Pro Bowl after testing positive and serving a four-game suspension during the preceding season.
- Steve Tasker rule: On punt returns, gunners receive a 15-yard unsportsmanlike conduct penalty for deliberately running out of bounds to avoid blocks, a tactic frequently used by Tasker before the rule was implemented.
- Tom Brady rule: A clarification to the Carson Palmer rule; prohibits a defender on the ground from lunging or diving at a quarterback's legs unless that defender has been blocked or fouled into the signal-caller. Enacted in 2009 in response to a play by Kansas City Chiefs safety Bernard Pollard, who on the ground sacked Brady and injured the Patriots quarterback's MCL and ACL, sidelining him for the rest of the 2008 season. Sometimes referred to as the Bernard Pollard rule.
- Tom Dempsey rule: Any shoe that is worn by a player with an artificial limb on his kicking leg must have a kicking surface that conforms to that of a normal kicking shoe. Enacted in 1977. Dempsey, who was born without toes on his right foot and no fingers on his right hand, wore a modified shoe with a flattened and enlarged toe surface, generating controversy about whether such a shoe gave him an unfair advantage kicking field goals. Dempsey's game-winning 63-yard field goal in 1970 set the record for longest field goal, a record that held until 2013.
- Tua Tagovailoa rule: Enacted in 2022 after the Miami Dolphins quarterback suffered a particularly serious concussion during a game against the Cincinnati Bengals, which itself had followed what appeared to possibly be another suffered concussion during the prior week’s match against the Buffalo Bills, the NFL and NFLPA agreed to expand the list of concussion symptoms that would prohibit a player’s return to the game if spotted to include ataxia. This rule change has been enforced by independent certified athletic trainers who monitor athletes for concussion symptoms and may remove players from the game if such symptoms are displayed.
- Ty Law rule (also known as the Rodney Harrison rule): Enacted in 2004, placed more emphasis on the Mel Blount rule. Enacted after Law, Harrison, and the rest of the New England Patriots defense utilized an aggressive coverage scheme, involving excessive jamming of wide receivers at the line of scrimmage, in the 2003 AFC championship game against the Indianapolis Colts.

== Gestures and celebrations ==
- Ickey Shuffle: Dance done by Cincinnati Bengals running back Ickey Woods whenever he scored a touchdown. Woods was forced to move the dance to the sidelines behind the Bengals' bench after officials starting penalizing him for unsportsmanlike conduct.
- Lambeau Leap: During home games at Lambeau Field, some players from the Green Bay Packers would leap into the stands after scoring a touchdown. Originally created by LeRoy Butler, it was made popular by Robert Brooks. Players in other stadiums imitate the leap.
- Mile High Salute: A touchdown celebration used by Denver Broncos running back Terrell Davis during his playing career, in which he and a teammate would salute each other in homage to the United States Armed Forces. A simplified variant (including only the salute portion) has been used by Broncos players ever since.
- Sack Dance: New York Jets defensive end Mark Gastineau was nationally famous for doing his signature "Sack Dance" after sacking an opposing quarterback. However, he had to stop when the NFL declared it "unsportsmanlike taunting" in March 1984 and began fining players for it.
- Tebowing: A pose imitating Tim Tebow's stance when praying.
- Trump Dance: A "mix of fist pumps and hip shimmies" popularized by President Donald Trump and increasingly adopted by several NFL players as a celebration dance following his election to a second term in 2024.

== Other ==
- The Battle of Los Angeles: The series currently played between the Los Angeles Chargers and Los Angeles Rams as they are the two teams based in Los Angeles. The series originally came into existence in 1982 after the Raiders had relocated from Oakland to Southern California, though the rivalry ended when both teams would relocate following the 1994 season. The series was revived following the Rams and Chargers both relocating back to the city in 2016 and 2017 respectively.
- Bird Gauntlet: The five teams that use a bird-based team name and mascot (Arizona Cardinals, Atlanta Falcons, Baltimore Ravens, Philadelphia Eagles and Seattle Seahawks). In order to run the bird gauntlet, a team must be scheduled to face all five teams (which, given that four of the five teams are in the NFC, effectively requires a team be in that conference) and defeat them all, which has never occurred. Since the Ravens joined the gauntlet in 1996, no team has successfully run the bird gauntlet; the most recent to fail was the 2022 New Orleans Saints. A Cat Gauntlet consisting of the Carolina Panthers, Cincinnati Bengals, Detroit Lions and Jacksonville Jaguars exists, but is far rarer due to how each of the four teams is distributed in different divisions and conferences.
- Boise Rule: A rule instituted by the NFL in 2011 banning non-green playing surfaces. "Boise" refers to Albertsons Stadium (then known as Bronco Stadium), the home field of Boise State University, famous for its blue playing surface. The rule was viewed as a reaction to potential sponsor influence, as no NFL team had considered adopting a non-green surface.
- The Duke: A nickname for the late Wellington Mara, longtime owner of the New York Giants. The nickname stems from the Duke of Wellington, an actual English hereditary title. His father Tim named him in honor of the Duke of Wellington. This nickname was extended to the official game ball used by the NFL "The Duke" named in honor of Mr. Mara. To this day one can notice the moniker "THE DUKE." branded into every official NFL football just to the left of the NFL Shield. (In Denver, the same nickname was given to quarterback John Elway, after a teammate noticed that his walk to the huddle before The Drive in 1987 looked like John Wayne's.)
- Harbaugh Bowl: Rare games when brothers John and Jim Harbaugh, both NFL head coaches, met as opponents, which included Super Bowl XLVII, the first Super Bowl in which brothers were opposing coaches. The games have also been given nicknames like the "HarBowl".
- K-Gun: Nickname referring to the no-huddle offense used by the Buffalo Bills with quarterback Jim Kelly during the late 1980s and early to mid-1990s. The K in K-Gun comes from "Killer", the nickname given to Kelly's teammate Keith McKeller.
- Manning Bowl: Rare games when quarterback brothers Peyton (formerly of the Indianapolis Colts and Denver Broncos) and Eli Manning (New York Giants) met as opponents.
- No Fun League: Used by various reports criticizing the league for its sanctions imposed on teams. Popularized by the XFL.
- Red Gun: The offense of Jerry Glanville when he was with the Atlanta Falcons
- Snoopy Bowl: Annual preseason game (week 3) between the New York Giants and the New York Jets. The name was coined in 2010 when New Meadowlands Stadium was renamed to MetLife Stadium, stemming from Snoopy being the mascot for MetLife; a Snoopy-themed trophy was also awarded to the winner. The moniker was phased out in 2016 after MetLife stopped using Snoopy in its marketing campaigns.
- Terrible Towel: a banner conceived by the late Myron Cope (long time Steeler commentator) used by fans of the Pittsburgh Steelers to cheer for their team, consisting of a yellow towel with the words "Terrible Towel" in black, to be waved in the air. The Carolina Panthers also began a spin-off known as the "Growl Towel". Also spoofed by the Packers following their third Super Bowl victory as the "Title Towel". Similar traditions have also started in other sports, as Towel Power used by the Vancouver Canucks of the National Hockey League and the Homer Hanky used by Major League Baseball's Minnesota Twins.
- Tush Push: A variant of the QB sneak created by the Philadelphia Eagles under Jalen Hurts where the Eagles' O-line and other offensive players "push" Hurts further than a normal QB sneak usually for a touchdown. Also known as the Brotherly Shove or Rugby Sneak. The tush push had been explicitly illegal until 2005, subject to a helping the runner penalty; even when illegal, the foul was seldom enforced (having not been called in 14 years before the rule change).
- War Room: Another term for the Draft Room, a room at a team's main office space where team executives and others prepare for and make selections during the NFL draft every year.

== See also ==
- TMQ Team Nicknames
- Lists of nicknames – nickname list articles on Wikipedia
- List of athletes by nickname
- List of nicknames in basketball
- List of baseball nicknames
- List of nicknamed NFL games and plays
