= Kent McCloughan =

American football player and scout (born 1940)

No. 47
- Position: Cornerback

Personal information
- Born: February 12, 1940 (age 86); Broken Bow, Nebraska, U.S.
- Listed height: 6 ft 1 in (1.85 m)
- Listed weight: 190 lb (86 kg)

Career information
- High school: Broken Bow
- College: Nebraska (1961–1964)
- NFL draft: 1965: 3rd round, 34th overall pick
- AFL draft: 1965: 11th round, 82nd overall pick

Career history
- Oakland Raiders (1965–1970)

Awards and highlights
- AFL champion (1967); 2× First-team All-AFL (1966, 1967); Second-team All-AFL (1968); 2× AFL All-Star (1966, 1967); Third-team All-American (1964); First-team All-Big Eight (1964)

Career NFL/AFL statistics
- Interceptions: 15
- Stats at Pro Football Reference

Kent Auburn McCloughan (born February 12, 1940) is an American former professional football player who was a cornerback for the American Football League (AFL)'s Oakland Raiders from 1965 through 1969, and for the National Football League (NFL)'s Raiders in 1970. He played college football for the Nebraska Cornhuskers. His pro career ended early because of a devastating knee injury. He was twice named first-team All-AFL and was selected to play in the AFL All-Star Game twice. He is closely associated with use of the bump and run coverage technique as a cornerback. He was on the 1967 Raiders team that won the AFL championship.

== Early life ==
McCloughan was born on February 12, 1940, in Broken Bow, Nebraska. McCloughan attended Broken Bow High School. He was a two-way player on the school's football team, at halfback and safety. As a junior, the 16-year old, 6 ft 1 in (1.85 m) 180 lb (81.6 kg) McCloughan scored 139 of his team's 224 points in 1959, setting a Southwest Conference scoring record. He averaged nearly 9.5 yards per carry, while gaining 1,267 yards rushing. He was also a favored pass receiver, and on defense led Broken Bow with 74 tackles in eight games, playing safety. The Omaha World-Herald named him to its first-team All-State team. He was the only junior named to that team over a six-year period. The Associated Press (AP) named him first-team All-State.

As a 6 ft 2 in (1.88 m) 190 lb (86 kg) senior in 1960, McCloughan scored 148 points for the football team. He averaged 10.3 yards per carry and had 77 tackles on defense at safety. In one October 1960 game, he had 159 yards in 20 carries, and 14 tackles on defense. The Associated Press again named him first-team All-State, as did the Omaha World-Herald. He also was named All-Southwest Conference in 1960. He was an honorable mention in Scholastic Coach magazine.

McCloughan also was a championship member of the school's track and field team. McCloughan established a Nebraska state record (21.4 sec) in the 220-yard dash in 1961 in the Nebraska state championship track meet, which stood until Kenzo Cotton broke it in 2012. He also won the 100-yard dash championship in 1961 (9.8 seconds), tying a state record. He came in second in throwing the shot put (50 ft 8 in/15. 4 m). He was All-State and an All-American in track. At one time, he also held the Nebraska high school 100-yard dash record of 9.6 seconds, set in 1961.

In the May 1959 and 1960 Kansas state high school championship track meets, McCloughan had tied for the gold medal in the 100-yard dash, running 10.1 seconds in both meets. In the May 1960 championships, he was second overall in the 220-yard dash (22.2 seconds). In 1960, McCloughan won the state Class B titles in the 100- and 220-yard dashes; and was on the winning 880-yard Broken Bow relay team, which won in record-setting time.

McCloughan was the leading scorer on the school's basketball team in 1958–59, and later set the school scoring record. He led all players in his conference in scoring in 1960–61. He was first-team All-Conference in basketball in 1959–60 and 1960–61.

In high school, McCloughan was called a "once-in-a-lifetime athlete that some coaches get and others long for", and possibly the greatest athlete in his conference's history. He was known as the "Custer County Comet".

== College career ==
McCloughan chose to attend the University of Nebraska. He was a two-way player at running back and defensive back on Nebraska's football team, playing in the Big Eight Conference. McCloughan also returned kickoffs and punts during his time at Nebraska. He was on the varsity football team from 1962 to 1964.

Under head coach Bob Devaney, in 1962 Nebraska had its first winning season since 1954, with a 9–2 record. McCloughan played in 10 games, with 39 carries for 232 yards (5.9 yards per carry), with two rushing touchdowns. He also had four receptions for 30 yards. Nebraska defeated the University of Miami in the Gotham Bowl, 36–34. McCloughan only had two rushing attempts in the game. At the end of the regular season, Devaney said that in the coming seasons McCloughan would be a top player on both offense and defense.

In 1963, Nebraska was 10–1, and ranked 6th in the final Associated Press national poll among college football teams. On offense at running back McCloughan rushed for 261 yards and four touchdowns, averaging 5.4 yards per carry. He also had six receptions for 103 yards (17.2 yards per reception). In a November 2 win over the University of Missouri, 13–12, McCloughan had an interception, and then later in the game had two pass receptions during the offensive drive leading to Nebraska's game-winning touchdown. Overall in the game, he had 38 yards on nine carries and 42 yards on three receptions.

Nebraska won the Big Eight Conference title with a 29–20 win over the University of Oklahoma in late November, which allowed them to play in the Orange Bowl. McCloughan scored a touchdown late in that game. Nebraska defeated Auburn, 13–7 in the January 1, 1964 Orange Bowl. In the Orange Bowl, McCloughan rushed for 25 yards on five carries, had a kick return of 18 yards and punt return of 11 yards.

As a senior in 1964, Nebraska was 9–2 and again finished No. 6 in the final Associated Press poll. They were again Big Eight Conference champions. McCloughan had Nebraska career highs of 96 carries, 367 rushing yards, 11 pass receptions and 213 receiving yards. He averaged 3.8 yards per carry and 19.4 yards per reception. He led the Big Eight in rushing touchdowns (8) and receiving touchdowns (4). Nebraska lost to the University of Arkansas in the January 1, 1965 Cotton Bowl, 10–7. In a defensive battle, McCloughan had 24 rushing yards in eight carries and three receptions for three yards. The AP named him first-team All-Big Eight.

McCloughan was also on Nebraska's track team. As a sophomore in 1963, at the Big Eight Conference track championships, he was third in the 100-yard dash and sixth in the 220-yard dash, even though he was unable to fully practice due to his football obligations and had a leg injury. He was on Nebraska's championship 440-yard relay team at that meet. It is also reported that in 1963 he ran second in an indoor Big Eight Conference sprint competition. In 1964, he won the Big Eight Championship in the 220-yard dash (21.3 seconds), and was part of Nebraska's champion mile relay team. During the 1964 track season, he ran the 100-yard dash in 9.5 seconds.

== Professional career ==
The Houston Oilers selected McCloughan in the 11th round of the 1965 AFL draft, 82nd overall. The Washington Redskins drafted McCloughan in the third round of the 1965 NFL draft, 34th overall. The AFL's Oakland Raiders acquired McCloughan's rights from the Oilers, and claimed to have signed him to a contract in early January 1963. At that time, the AFL and NFL were in a battle to sign college players. Very soon after that announcement by the Raiders, McCloughan said he had not signed with the Raiders, as he would not jeopardize his ability to run for Nebraska's track team later that year.

Nebraska's athletic director and track coach took the position that even if McCloughan orally promised to play for the Raiders, but did not sign a contract, he would be eligible for the track team that spring. A few days later, the Raiders reported they had a "commitment" from McCloughan, rather than a contract. Shortly after that McCloughan actually signed a contract with the AFL's Raiders and gave up his eligibility to compete for the track team in 1965. He reportedly did so "because of pressure by the National Football League".

As early as September 1963, before his junior season at Nebraska, McCoughan said that if he became a professional football player, he saw himself playing as a defensive back. In his rookie preseason with the Raiders in 1965, the team used him as a defensive back. In his first preseason game, against the San Diego Chargers, he intercepted a pass and returned it 42 yards for a touchdown. He started all 14 games at left cornerback as a rookie in 1965, with three interceptions, playing opposite Dave Grayson at right cornerback.

In 1966, McCloughan again started all 14 games for the Raiders at left cornerback, with four interceptions. In a November 20 win over the Denver Broncos, 17–3, McCloughan had two interceptions and a blocked field goal attempt. The Associated Press named him the AFL's Defensive Player of the Week. He was selected to play in the AFL All-Star Game that season. The Associated Press and United Press International (UPI) named him first-team All-AFL, and the AFL and Newspaper Enterprise Association (NEA) named him second-team All-AFL. Grayson also made the All-Star Team and received first- and second-team All-AFL honors.

In 1967, McCloughan again started every game at left cornerback, with two interceptions. That season, he was joined by future Hall of Fame right cornerback Willie Brown. Brown was known for both his coverage and run stopping skills, while McCloughan would be assigned to cover the opposing team's best receiver, such as Hall of Fame San Diego Chargers' receiver Lance Alworth (against whom he performed well). Both used the bump and run coverage technique, which became a prominent hallmark of the Oakland Raiders.

Both McCloughan and Brown were selected to play in the AFL All-Star Game after the 1967 season. McCloughan was named first-team All-AFL by the AP, UPI, NEA and The Sporting News, and Brown was named second-team All-AFL by the AP, UPI and The Sporting News. The Raiders were 13–1, and defeated the Houston Oilers in the 1967 AFL championship game, 40–7. The Raiders met the Green Bay Packers in Super Bowl II, losing 33–14. After the Super Bowl ended, McCloughan stated he made a mistake in coverage that resulted in a 62-yard touchdown pass from Bart Starr to Boyd Dowler.

McCloughan started in the Raiders' first eight games in 1968, with one interception. He was injured during the third quarter of an October 27, 1968 game against the Cincinnati Bengals while covering a kickoff, and missed the last six games of the season. McCloughan had major knee surgery at the end of 1968, and would never fully recover. The Sporting News named him second-team All-AFL in 1968.

Nemiah Wilson replaced McCloughan at left cornerback in 1969. McCloughan appeared in only four games, without a start. In 1970, he started 10 games at left cornerback, with five interceptions. UPI named him second-team All-AFC. However, his knee was still bothering him during the season.

In June 1971, the Raiders traded McCloughan and Harry Schuh to the Los Angeles Rams for future Hall of Fame offensive tackle Bob Brown and two draft picks. McCloughan and Brown played two seasons together at Nebraska. While he did not resent the Raiders for trading him, he ultimately decided to retire. In July, he had also told the Rams he had a business opportunity in Colorado.

=== Bump and run ===
McCloughan has been strongly associated with using the "bump and run" technique as a cornerback defending receivers, by which a defensive back impedes progress of the wide receiver by body contact. At the time, persistent physical contact against the receiver was legal until the ball left the quarterback's hand. Hall of Fame Raiders coach John Madden said in 1980 that McCloughan originated the bump and run. McCloughan did not know if he invented the technique, but believed he was the first one to use it regularly. He and Willie Brown both commonly used the bump and run together in 1967 and 1968 with the Raiders, and Raiders defensive backs, such as Lester Hayes, continued the tradition. Joe Horrigan of the Pro Football Hall of Fame said "if I were to say who generally has been credited for it, Willie Brown is generally historically credited with popularizing the bump and run - not inventing it, but popularizing it".

There are various versions of who originated the bump and run. Brown said he developed the technique while playing with the Denver Broncos as a rookie in 1963 (where he played from 1963 to 1966). He got the idea based on his experience as a linebacker at Grambling State College. Brown said he taught the bump and run to McCloughan when Brown joined the Raiders in 1967. It is also reported that Brown's Denver head coach Jack Faulkner (1962 to 1964) had first seen future NBA Hall of Famer K.C. Jones use the technique in the late 1950s, and Faulkner brought it with him as a coach in professional football, including to Denver during Willie Brown's early years with the Broncos.

NFL cornerback Pat Fischer, who was well known for using the technique, said at one time it had originated with cornerback Abe Woodson who used it in the late 1950s and early 1960s, and who taught it to Fischer. Fischer also said at other times he learned it from cornerback Jimmy Hill. Six time Pro Bowl defensive back Erich Barnes said Chicago Bears' teammate J. C. Caroline was using the bump and run when Barnes came into the NFL in 1958, and was the best at it. He also said Abe Woodson used it early on.

Woodson himself said he did not first use it until 1963 or 1964, as a tactic to disrupt the Baltimore Colts' Johnny Unitas passing to Raymond Berry. Woodson said he got the idea from his San Franscisco 49ers' head coach Jack Christiansen, who had been a Hall of Fame defensive back with the Detroit Lions in the 1950s. Christiansen in turn said he got the idea for using the bump and run from watching Hall of Fame defensive back Dick "Night Train" Lane use the technique periodically with the Chicago Cardinals in the 1950s when the Cardinals' defense was blitzing. In searching for the bump and run's origins Christiansen observed "There isn't a whole lot that's truly new in football".

The strategy appeared so successful in the eyes of NFL rule-makers that, to help the offense, the rules were changed in 1974, 1977, and 1978, with each rule change favoring the receiver over the defender (see Penalty (American football).) In 1974, the most severe rule change regarding pass receivers and defenders was enacted. This rule stipulated that a player could only make contact one time within 3 yards of the line of scrimmage, and then could not make contact with the receiver after that. In 1977, the rule was amended to aid the pass receivers yet again. Starting that season, a defender could only make contact with a receiver one time overall, whether it be within 3 yards of the line of scrimmage or further downfield.

In 1978, the rule was amended to aid the pass receivers yet again. This became known as the Mel Blount Rule, after the Pittsburgh Steeler cornerback who had mastered the technique. Starting that season, a defender could make contact with a receiver only one time, and within 5 yards of the line of scrimmage (exclusive of defensive holding). If the defender made contact with a receiver 6 yards or more from the line of scrimmage, it was now considered illegal contact, even if the ball was not yet in the air.

== Scouting career ==
McCloughan began scouting for the Raiders in 1972, after being offered the position by general manager Ron Wolfe. Among other players, he recommended future All-AFL and AFL All-Star receiver Cliff Branch to the Raiders. In having their scouts review players, the Raiders often looked to McCloughan for a final opinion on a player. In 1988, the Green Bay Press-Gazette interviewed 18 NFL general managers and personnel directors to rate the best scouts in the NFL. At the time, McCloughan was a regional scout for the Los Angeles Raiders. He was rated the third-best among all NFL scouts.

== Personal life ==
Between his junior and senior years in high school, McCloughan was selected to attend Cornhusker Boys State, in Lincoln, Nebraska, based upon his athletic and scholastic achievements.

After his playing career, McCloughan moved to Loveland, Colorado, where he was the owner of a 40-unit apartment complex. He lived in Loveland with his wife Elnora, and three sons, David, Mark and Scot. Dave played defensive back in the NFL from 1991 to 1994, and Scot held a number of executive jobs in the NFL, including the general manager position for the Washington Redskins.

== See also ==
- Other American Football League players
