= Crazy Ray =

Unofficial mascot of the Dallas Cowboys

Wilford Jones
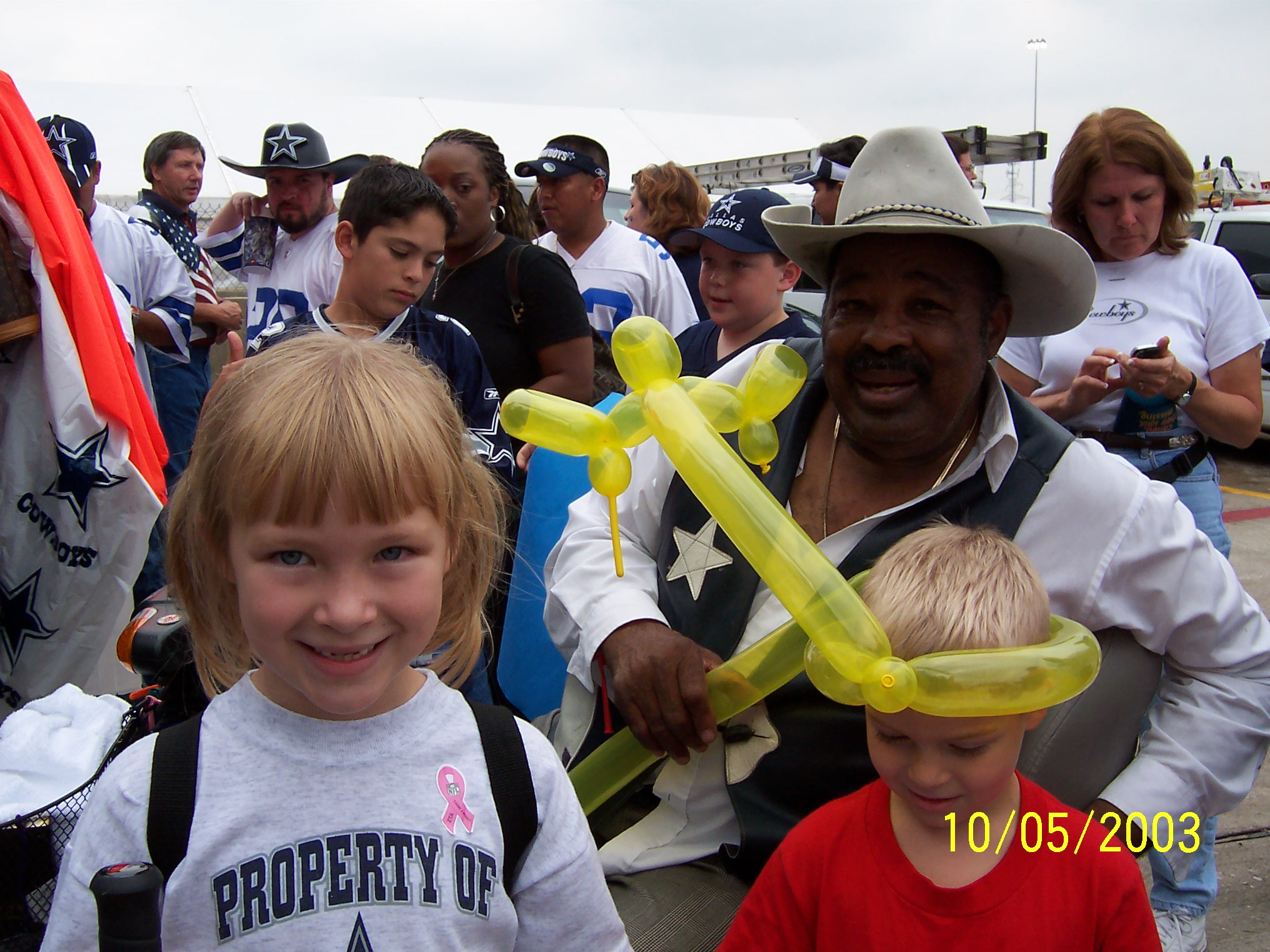
- Crazy Ray making balloon sculptures for children following a Cowboys win in 2003.
- Born: January 22, 1931
- Died: March 17, 2007 (aged 76)

Wilford Jones (January 22, 1931 – March 17, 2007), better known as Crazy Ray, was the unofficial mascot of the Dallas Cowboys. By some accounts, he was also the team's original mascot, who attended almost every home game since the team's inception.

== History ==
Wilford Jones was born in Nacogdoches, Texas on January 22nd, 1931. Growing up in Dallas, Texas, he was known as "Whistlin' Ray" in the city as a local celebrity for his whistling. He went to the Dallas Cowboys games as a kid, hitching rides from strangers before his dad took him. He started selling pennants at games in 1962 and quickly endeared himself to Cowboys fans with his western outfits, magic tricks, trademark whistle, and galloping along with a hobby horse.

He was never officially employed by the Cowboys, but was given a Special Parking Pass and All-access for home games. He was also known as the "Whistling Vendor" at Dallas Tornado soccer games, Texas Rangers baseball games, and at the Dallas Black Hawks minor-league professional ice hockey team at State Fair Coliseum. He could be seen at the State Fair of Texas and various concerts entertaining the public.

Crazy Ray also had a special friendship with rival Zema Williams (i.e. *Chief Zee), the Washington Redskins' unofficial mascot. In some photographs, Crazy Ray and Chief Zee were seen pretending to fight with each other during games.

Ray died on March 17, 2007, from heart disease and diabetes, aged 76, in Dallas. He missed only three games in 46 seasons.

== Honors ==
- Crazy Ray has a place in the Visa Hall of Fans Exhibit at the Pro Football Hall of Fame as he was selected as the fan choice for the Dallas Cowboys.

== See also ==
- The Barrel Man
- Chief Zee
- Fireman Ed
- Hogettes
- License Plate Guy
