= Barrel Man (Denver Broncos) =

American football spectator

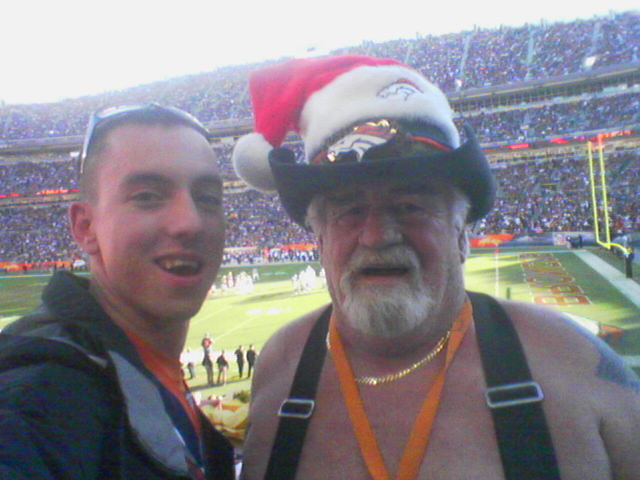
The Barrel Man at a game against the Raiders on December 24, 2005

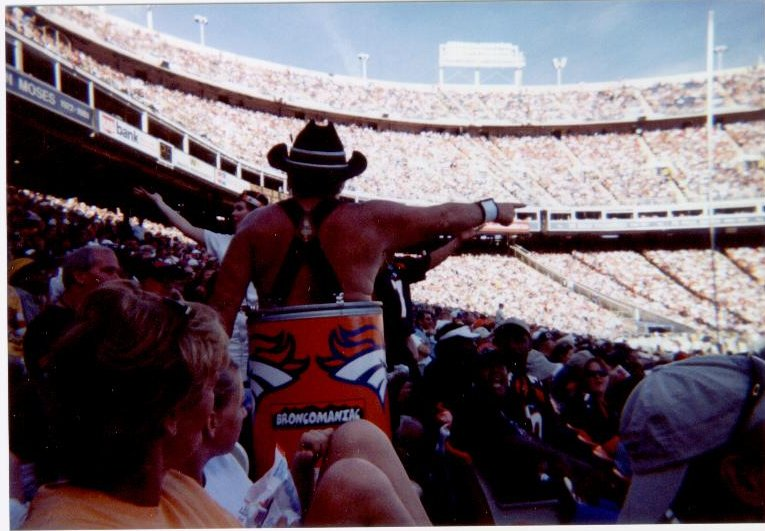
The Barrel Man at a game against New England at Mile High Stadium in 1998

Barrel Man, real name Tim McKernan (September 5, 1940 – December 5, 2009), was a superfan of the Denver Broncos. In all types of weather for 30 years, he attended every home game at both Mile High Stadium and INVESCO Field at Mile High wearing nothing but an orange barrel that covered his torso and a cowboy hat and boots. His costume was reminiscent of rodeo clowns (or barrelmen) who serve as a distraction to animals in the rodeo arena in order to protect riders who have been thrown and of the stereotype of the miner who lost his stake and had nothing left to wear but a barrel. He was the first Broncos fan inducted into the VISA Hall of Fans at the Pro Football Hall of Fame.

McKernan began attending Broncos games in 1967, eventually missing only four of them. He first wore a barrel in 1977 after making a $10 bet with his brother over whether wearing one would get him on television. He won, wearing one painted to resemble an Orange Crush can. The soft drink brand was also the nickname for the defensive unit of the orange-jerseyed Broncos who won the American Football Conference Championship that season. McKernan also showed up at games for the Denver Gold of the short-lived United States Football League in the mid-1980s, wearing a gold-painted barrel. McKernan retired his act after the 2007 season at the age of 67, but announced that he would continue attending games in normal dress.

McKernan had serious health issues in 2003, after an abdominal aneurysm ruptured. After that time he was restricted by doctors to wearing his barrel for one half of play, and then only when the temperature was above freezing. These health issues were a major reason behind McKernan's deciding to give up the barrel in 2007.

Retired after 40 years as a mechanic for United Airlines, McKernan and his wife were based in Gunnison, Colorado, but spent their offseasons traveling in their recreational vehicle. Due to the space constraints of living in an RV, McKernan sold his Super Bowl XXXII barrel for $30,000. The barrel, autographed by 49 Broncos from their first Super Bowl winning team, was sold to Nicholas Martinez of Las Animas, Colorado. McKernan gave 10% of his profits to Jubilee House, battered women's shelter in Gunnison.

McKernan died on December 5, 2009, of respiratory failure caused by idiopathic pulmonary fibrosis at age 69. The last Broncos game before his death was a rout of the Giants on Thanksgiving Day. In November 2009, the History Colorado Center honored the Barrel Man as part of an exhibit called Denver A to Z: Adrenaline to Zombies and (almost) Everything in Between. A statue of McKernan epitomizes D for Devoted.

== See also ==
- Bleacher Creatures
- Fireman Ed
- Chief Zee
- Crazy Ray
- Hogettes
- License Plate Guy
