= Bump and run coverage =

Strategy in American football

Bump and run coverage is a strategy widely used by cornerbacks in American football in which a defender lined up directly in front of a wide receiver would impede the intended route using their arms, hands, or entire body.

== History ==
In bump and run coverage, the defender makes contact with the receiver at the line of scrimmage to disrupt the pass pattern between the quarterback and receiver, and then continues to cover the receiver who is either running a delayed or off course pass pattern. Before rule changes, the defender could continue to make contact with a receiver until the quarterback threw the ball; so physical contact by the defender could continue downfield, beyond the line of scrimmage. Taken to an extreme, defenders could try and knock a receiver to the ground to prevent the receiver from having an opportunity to receive a pass.

In one view, the bump and run originated in the American Football League in the 1960s, one of whose earliest experts was Willie Brown of the Oakland Raiders. Before playing for the Raiders, Brown was a rookie with the Denver Broncos in 1963 and played there through 1966. Brown has said he came up with the idea for the bump and run in 1963, based upon his experience as a linebacker at Grambling University, and first used it as a cornerback with the Denver Broncos in 1963.

In yet another version of possible origins, Jack Faulkner gets significant credit for development of the bump and run. Faulkner was head coach for the Broncos from 1962 to 1964, during Brown's first two professional years. While Faulkner was the Los Angeles Rams defensive backfield coach in 1958, the team tried out future Naismith Memorial Basketball Hall of Famer K. C. Jones as a defensive back. Using his style as a basketball defender, Jones would cover receivers at the line of scrimmage and hand check them as they ran down the field. Jones decided on a basketball career, but Faulkner took the knowledge of what he had seen from Jones with him when he became an AFL defensive backs coach with the Los Angeles Chargers; and then to Denver, where Willie Brown became a pro player.

On the other hand, National Football League cornerback Pat Fischer, who is closely associated with the bump and run, believes that cornerback Abe Woodson, who taught Fischer the technique when they both played for the St. Louis Cardinals (1965–66), originated the bump and run while playing for the San Francisco 49ers in the late 1950s and early 1960s. In another telling, Fischer said he learned the bump and run in the early 1960s from teammate Jimmy Hill, at the urging of Cardinals defensive coach Chuck Drulis.

Erich Barnes, a six-time Pro Bowl defensive back in the NFL from 1958 to 1971 said that Chicago Bears' teammate and defensive back J. C. Caroline was using the bump and run technique when Barnes came into the NFL in 1958. He also identified Abe Woodson as another defensive back using the bump and run. Woodson himself said he did not first use it until 1963 or 1964, as a tactic to disrupt the Baltimore Colts' Johnny Unitas passing to Raymond Berry. Woodson said he got the idea from his San Franscisco 49ers' head coach Jack Christiansen, a Hall of Fame defensive back for the Detroit Lions in the 1950s, who in turn said he got the idea from watching Hall of Fame defensive back Dick "Night Train" Lane use the technique periodically with the Chicago Cardinals in the 1950s when the Cardinals' defense was blitzing.

Pro Football Hall of Fame executive vice president Joe Horrigan, stated: "'But if I were to say who generally has been credited for it, Willie Brown is generally historically credited with popularizing the bump and run - not inventing it, but popularizing it.'" The Oakland Raiders of Brown and fellow cornerback Kent McCloughan (who Hall of Fame coach John Madden claimed created the bump and run) raised the prominence of the bump and run in professional football starting in 1967, and its use became a legacy with the Raiders and a team hallmark. Christiansen said in 1970 about the issue of origins, "It's popular now that a lot of people have discovered it ... but I think if you researched it deeply enough, you'd find that Amos Alonzo Stagg probably picked it up from one of the math students at the University of Chicago. There isn't a whole lot that's truly new in football".

During the 1970s, Hall of Fame cornerback Mel Blount of the Pittsburgh Steelers excelled in this coverage to such a point as to cause numerous rule changes (see below) strictly limiting when and where a defender may make contact with a potential receiver in order to make it easier for receivers to run their routes and increase scoring. The rule limiting the pass defender's conduct became known as the Mel Blount Rule.

== Technique and rules limiting it ==
This play works well against routes that require the receiver to be in a certain spot at a certain time. The disadvantage, however, is that the receiver can shed contact and get behind the cornerback for a big play. This varies from the more traditional defensive formation in which a defensive player will give the receiver a "cushion" of about 5 yards to prevent the receiver from getting behind him.

In 1974, the NFL changed its rules so a defensive player could only make contact one time with a receiver within 3 yards of the line of scrimmage, and then could not make contact with the receiver after that. Cincinnati Bengals owner and Hall of Fame coach Paul Brown, who was part of the NFL's rule making committee, had lobbied for the rule, known as the "Isaac Curtis Rule" for the Bengals slender and extremely fast star receiver. During a 1973 playoff game against the Miami Dolphins (who went on to win Super Bowl VIII), the Dolphins defensive strategy included double teaming Curtis and knocking him to the ground as often as possible so that he had no opportunity to make a reception. Dolphins Hall of Fame coach Don Shula was against the rule change.

With subsequent NFL rule changes, a defensive back now is allowed contact within the five-yard bump zone, except for holding the receiver. Beyond that five-yard space, the defender can be called for an illegal contact penalty, costing five yards and an automatic first down. This rule, enforced since 1978 NFL season, is known colloquially as the Mel Blount Rule, after the Pittsburgh Steeler Hall of Fame defensive back. This accompanied another significant 1978 rule change that allowed offensive linemen to extend their arms, lock their elbows and grab the defensive lineman's jersey to some degree. The rule was modified in 1994 so that if a receiver is trying to evade the defender, the defender cannot impede the receiver's movements.

Blount explained that some key events triggering the rule change occurred during a 1977 game between the Steelers and the Cincinnati Bengals. Bengals tight end Bob Trumpy was in the process of catching a softly thrown ball over the middle of the field, and Blount hit Trumpy so hard that the collision (unintentionally) broke Trumpy's jaw. Trumpy later could not even remember the play. On the next play, Blount was jamming Bengals' wide receiver Isaac Curtis so successfully, Curtis could not get past the line of scrimmage. Bengals' owner Paul Brown used his position on the NFL competition committee to require a meeting with Blount about the two plays. Blount told them he would not change his style of play until the rules were changed requiring him to play a different style.

After the rule changes, Blount went to three Pro Bowls and was an All-Pro three times. The Steelers still led the NFL in fewest points allowed in 1978 and 1979. They won Super Bowls in the 1978 and 1979 seasons, and with a more open passing game, Steelers' quarterback Terry Bradshaw was the NFL's Most Valuable Player in 1978, and was the Super Bowl Most Valuable Player in both 1978 and 1979.

Passing statistics increased significantly after the rule change. In 1977, Drew Pearson led the NFL in receiving yards with 870. In 1978, four players had over 1,000 yards receiving. Wide receiver Harold Carmichael went from 665 receiving yards in 1977 to 1,072 yards in 1978; and wide receiver Steve Largent went from 33 receptions in 1977 to an AFC-leading 71 receptions in 1978, and from 643 yards to 1,168 yards.

In contrast, under NCAA rules, contact is allowed anywhere on the field as long as contact is in front of the defender and a pass is not in the air.

== See also ==
- American football strategy
