= Stickum =

Adhesive

Stickum products

Stickum is a trademark adhesive of Mueller Sports Medicine, of Prairie du Sac, Wisconsin, United States. It is available in powder, paste, and aerosol spray forms. According to the company website, the spray form helps improve grip "even in wet conditions". Suggested uses include for bat handles and vaulting poles, with many vendors also promoting the product for use by weightlifters, and for various other athletic applications.

Stickum, along with other adhesive or "sticky" substances (such as glue, rosin/tree sap, or food substances), were used for years in the National Football League to assist players in gripping the ball. The use of adhesives such as Stickum was banned by the league in 1981, and the resulting action became known as the "Lester Hayes rule", named after Oakland Raiders defensive back Lester Hayes, known for his frequent use of Stickum. Despite the ban, Hall of Famer Jerry Rice freely admitted to illegally using Stickum throughout his career, leading many fans to question the integrity of his receiving records. Rice's claim that "all players" in his era used Stickum was quickly denied by Hall of Fame contemporaries Cris Carter and Michael Irvin.

In the National Basketball Association, Houston Rockets center Dwight Howard was caught using Stickum in a game against the Atlanta Hawks in 2016.
