= Broken Bow High School (Broken Bow, Nebraska) =

Coordinates: 41°24′28″N 99°38′19″W

Location
- 323 N 7th Avenue; Broken Bow, Nebraska; United States

Information
- Type: Public high school
- School district: 3
- Faculty: 20
- Teaching staff: 16.94 (FTE)
- Grades: 9–12
- Enrollment: 238 (2023–2024)
- Student to teacher ratio: 14.05
- Campus: Rural
- Colors: Crimson and Ivory
- Athletics: Indians
- Affiliation: Broken Bow Public School District 25
- Conference: Southwest Conference
- Website: http://www.bbps.org

Broken Bow High School is a public high school in Broken Bow, Nebraska, United States.

== Description ==
Broken Bow is a public school which had approximately 291 students enrolled as of 2009.

== Athletics ==
The school colors are red and white, and the athletic teams are the Indians.

== Notable alumni ==
- Kent McCloughan, former professional football player
