= Chief Zee =

American sports fan (1941–2016)

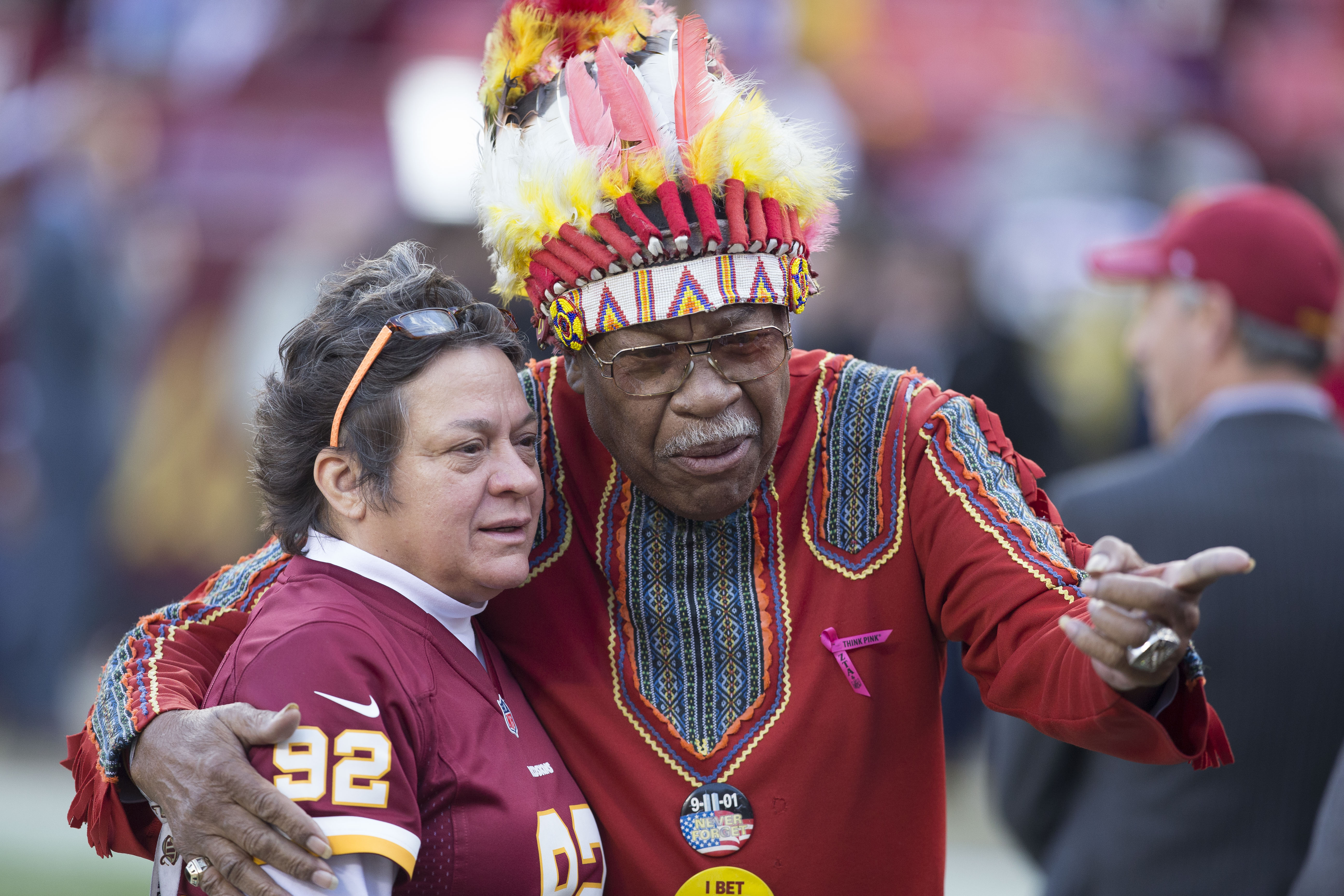
- Chief Zee with a fan at FedEx Field on January 10, 2016
- Born: July 7, 1941; Colquitt, Georgia
- Died: July 19, 2016 (aged 75); Oxon Hill, Maryland

Zema Williams (July 7, 1941 – July 19, 2016), better known as Chief Zee, was a well-known fan and unofficial mascot of the franchise then known as the Washington Redskins. Dressed in a faux Native American war bonnet, rimmed glasses, and red jacket, Chief Zee began attending Redskins games in 1978.

== History ==
Born in Colquitt, Georgia on July 7, 1941, Williams worked as a sharecropper and picked cotton as a youth. He later drove a truck, when he got a draft notice in 1960. Two years later, he completed his military service at Fort Riley, and returned to driving trucks. By 1968, he was a car salesman in Washington, D.C.

Williams first showed up in costume at RFK Stadium on September 10, 1978. In 1983, Chief Zee attended a game against the Eagles at Veterans Stadium. Following their team's 10-point loss to the Redskins, he was attacked, suffering a broken arm, leg and ribs as well as a torn original costume, leaving him hospitalized. He returned the next year to Philadelphia but after a woman threw a beer in his face, it was his last time.

On August 9, 2008, Williams set down his signature prop, a toy tomahawk, while he was signing autographs at the Redskins' preseason game against the Buffalo Bills. When he turned to retrieve it, it was gone. The 12-inch tomahawk had a slender wooden handle with a rubber blade, and appears in many photos of Williams since he started attending Redskins games over 30 years prior. By August 28, 2008, Chief Zee's tomahawk was returned to him with the help of Redskins tight end Chris Cooley who got a call from someone that said they had it. He swapped a signed jersey for the tomahawk.

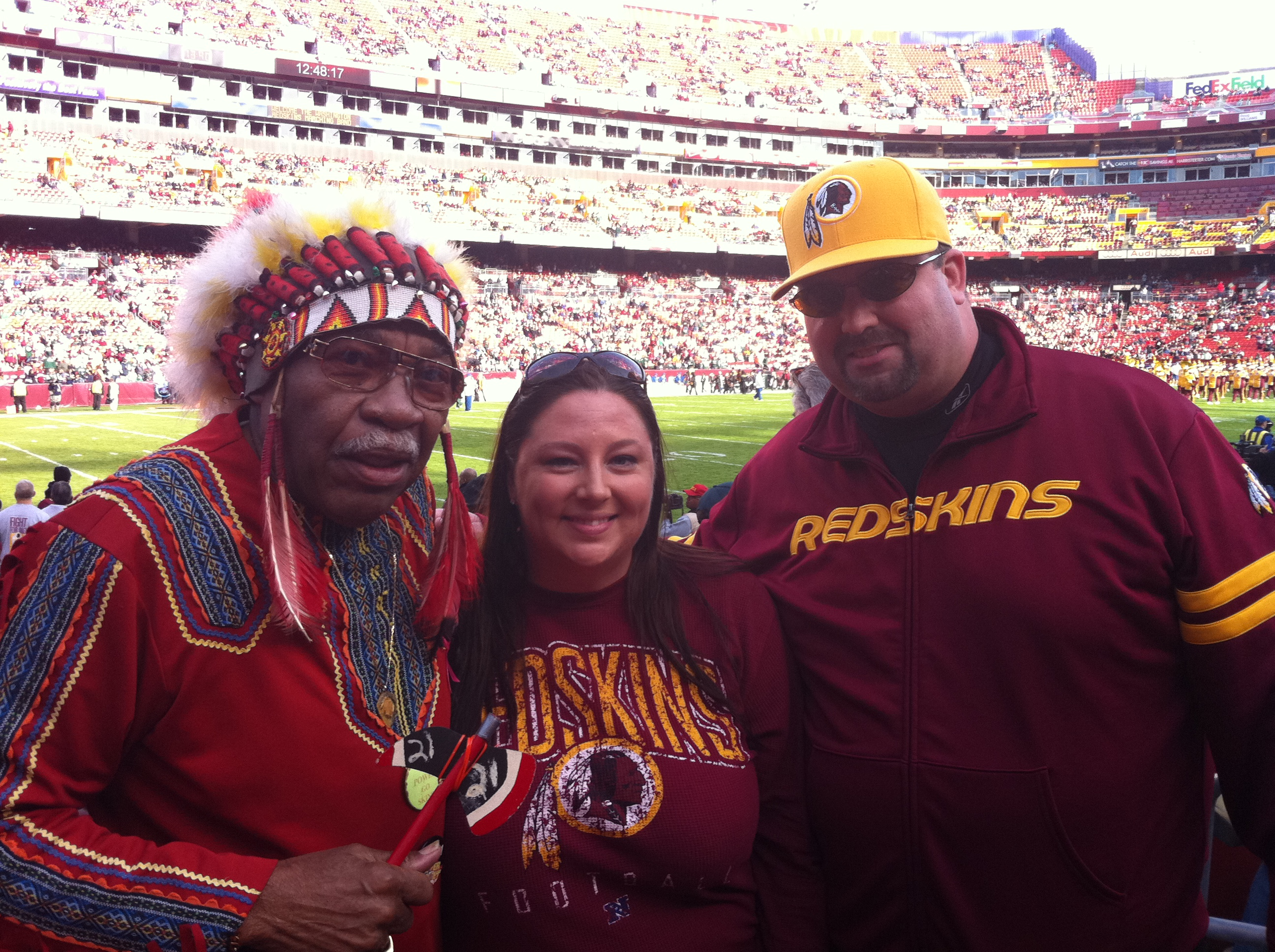
Zee (left) with fans in 2011

In his later years, Williams lived on Social Security and had difficulty walking. Daniel Snyder, the former owner of the Redskins, purchased the scooter that he used. Williams also faced eviction due to not being able to keep up with his rent, but several fans used a GoFundMe campaign to raise enough to pay both back rent and enough ahead that the situation would not arise again.

Williams died in his sleep on July 19, 2016, 12 days after his 75th birthday.

== Honors ==
- November 7, 1985, was declared "Chief Zee Day" in Washington, D.C.
- In 2000, Visa and the Pro Football Hall of Fame selected the biggest fan of each of the then-31 teams and placed them in an exhibit in Canton. He was the fan chosen for the Washington Redskins.

== Controversy ==
Some people consider Williams' portrayal of American Indians to have been offensive. His use of a stylized headdress was often referenced as the reason for offense, as the headdress is a sacred, central cultural item for many tribes.

== See also ==
- The Barrel Man
- Crazy Ray
- Fireman Ed
- Hogettes
- License Plate Guy
