= License Plate Guy =

American sports fan

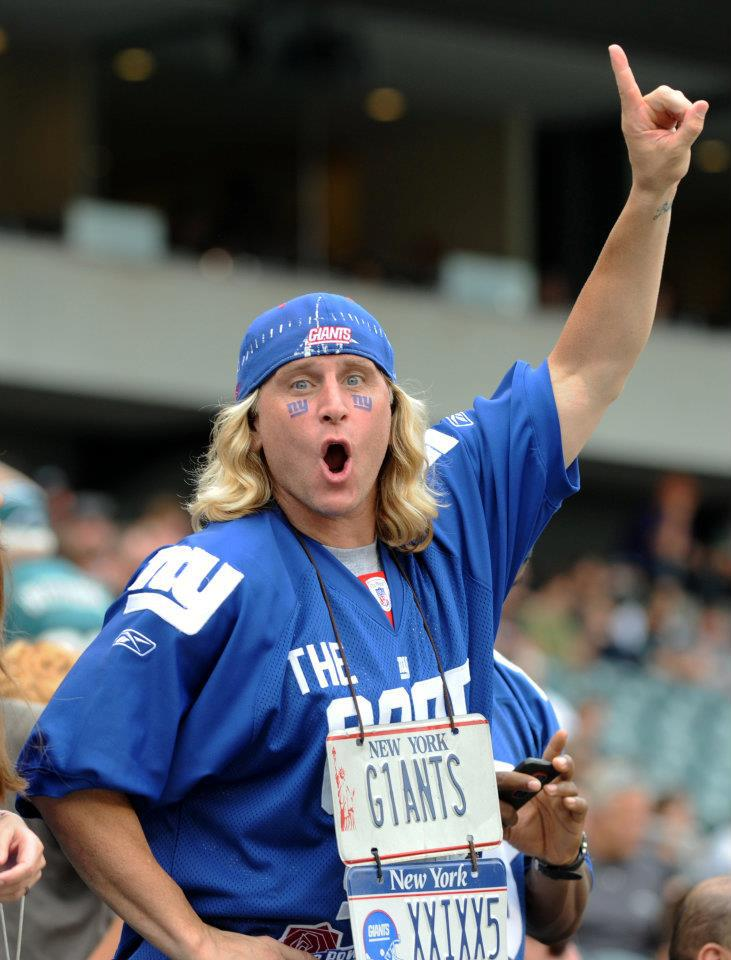
- Ruback in 2012
- Born: Joseph Ruback; June 7, 1969 (age 57)
- Occupation: Athletic Director

Joe Ruback, better known as License Plate Guy (born June 7, 1969), is a fan of the New York Giants, best known for the license plates he wears at each game and his presence at most Giants games in general. Ruback went to all 283 games (272 regular season and eleven playoff games) the team played at Giants Stadium. He has attended every Giants home and away game since 2000, except during the 2020 NFL season in which fans were not permitted to attend due to the COVID-19 pandemic.

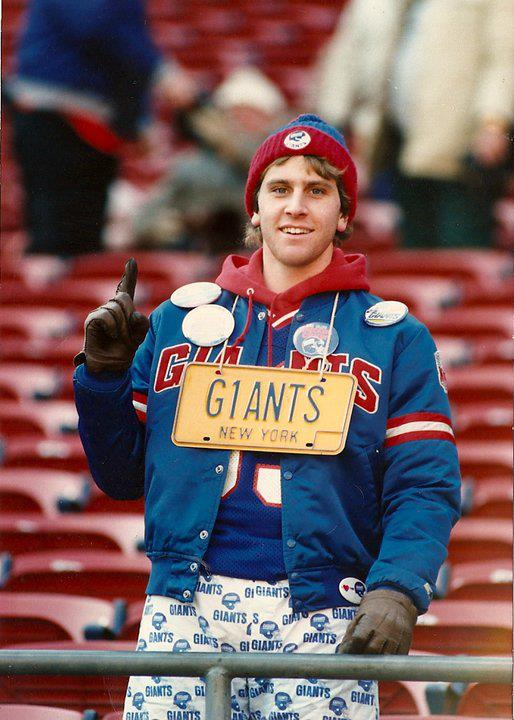
A young Ruback at Giants Stadium wearing his first plate "G1ANTS"

Ruback first wore a plate to a game when he was 16, but the tradition of license plates did not become what it is now until the last decade. He now boasts a collection of over 100 Giants-themed plates.

Joe Ruback has made several appearances on The Boomer & Carton radio show on WFAN in New York. Ruback has become a fan favorite, but prides himself as "an average fan" and can be seen before every game (home and away) in the parking lot taking pictures with fans. Joe has also been featured on NFL Network and Good Day New York.

In 2020, Ruback was named as a member of the Giants Nation Show Ring of Honor.

== Philanthropy ==
Ruback participates in many off the field philanthropic endeavors including "Pink Tailgate" raising money and awareness for breast cancer and those affected.

In 2017, Ruback organized a charity softball game to raise money for the Tom Coughlin Jay Fund. Working with Landon Collins, who headlined the event, a softball match was organized between current and past Giants team members. The event also featured a dodgeball game and a home run derby.

== See also ==
- Barrel Man
- Bleacher Creatures
- Chief Zee
- Crazy Ray
- Fireman Ed
- Hogettes
