= Lester Hayes =

American football player

No. 37
- Position: Cornerback

Personal information
- Born: January 22, 1955 (age 71); Houston, Texas, U.S.
- Listed height: 6 ft 0 in (1.83 m)
- Listed weight: 200 lb (91 kg)

Career information
- High school: Wheatley (Houston)
- College: Texas A&M (1973–1976)
- NFL draft: 1977: 5th round, 126th overall pick

Career history
- Oakland / Los Angeles Raiders (1977–1986)

Awards and highlights
- 2× Super Bowl champion (XV, XVIII); NFL Defensive Player of the Year (1980); 4× First-team All-Pro (1980, 1981, 1983, 1984); Second-team All-Pro (1982); 5× Pro Bowl (1980–1984); NFL interceptions leader (1980); NFL 1980s All-Decade Team; Second-team All-American (1975); First-team All-SWC (1975); Second-team All-SWC (1976)

Career NFL statistics
- Interceptions: 39
- Interception yards: 572
- Fumble recoveries: 7
- Defensive touchdowns: 5
- Stats at Pro Football Reference

Lester Craig Hayes (born January 22, 1955) is an American former professional football player who was a cornerback for the Oakland / Los Angeles Raiders of the National Football League (NFL).

Hayes shares the all-time club record for regular-season interceptions, 39, with Willie Brown, while his eight playoff interceptions rank as the fifth-most in NFL history. His season with 13 interceptions in 1980 is tied for second-most in a single season all-time and the most since 1952. Hayes contributed to the Raiders' Super Bowl wins in 1980 and 1983. He was a five-time All-Pro selection and Pro Bowler (1980–1984).

== College career ==
In college starting in 1973, Hayes played for the Texas A&M Aggies. He first played defensive end as a freshman and then linebacker and safety as a sophomore. During his junior and senior years, Hayes settled in as a safety and became an All-American.

Hayes was nicknamed "The Judge." According to Hayes, he received the nickname in 1975 after a win against rival Texas, as he explained: "They had a partial-mortal, partial-god named Earl Campbell. I predicted he'd have an off day and gain 21 yards. He gained 23. I passed a decree on Mr. Earl Campbell."

Hayes intercepted 14 passes in his Texas A&M career (returned for 189 yards and a touchdown), ranking second in school history.

== Professional career ==
Hayes was converted by John Madden from safety to cornerback after being chosen by the Raiders in the fifth round of the 1977 draft.

Henceforth, Hayes became known for his bump-and-run coverage style of play coveted by team executive Al Davis. Hayes played with a distinctive stance, crouching very low when facing the opposing wide receiver.

Hayes was known as one of the greatest shutdown cornerbacks in NFL history, and Deion Sanders, often cited as one of the all-time elite modern cornerbacks, wrote that Hayes was one of his key influences growing up watching football. In 1980, Hayes led the NFL with 13 regular-season interceptions, tied for second-most with Dan Sandifer, who had set a record in 1948, and behind Dick "Night Train" Lane with 14 in 1952, and was named AP Defensive Player of the Year and the NEA Defensive Player of the Year.

Hayes added five more interceptions in Oakland's three 1980 playoff games, as they advanced to a victory in Super Bowl XV. His best performance was arguably in Super Bowl XVIII, played on his 29th birthday. Hayes had only one tackle, but that was because he so effectively covered Charlie Brown and Art Monk that Joe Theismann hardly threw to the left side of the field.

During his last four seasons, he formed a partnership with Mike Haynes that has been considered one of the best in league history. Hayes and Haynes gave the Raiders the luxury of having two shutdown corners. They are widely reckoned as being the prototypes for a generation of speedy and physical cornerbacks.

Hayes retired after the 1986 season with a total of 39 regular-season interceptions (including four defensive touchdowns), a Raider record shared with Hall of Famer Willie Brown, and eight playoff interceptions, fifth-most in NFL postseason history as of 2025.

In 2012, the Professional Football Researchers Association named Hayes to the PFRA Hall of Very Good Class of 2012.

=== Stickum usage ===
Hayes was introduced to Stickum, an adhesive substance used by players to improve their grip, in his 1977 rookie season by Fred Biletnikoff. Instead of just applying a small amount to his hands, though, he began to slather it all over his arms and even his uniform, drawing more and more attention to the substance. Hayes later described the influence the adhesive had on his career, saying that before being introduced to it in his rookie year, he "couldn't catch a cold in Antarctica". The use of Stickum was banned by the NFL in 1981 by a rule bearing his name.

In the six seasons that Hayes played following the banning of Stickum, he had 14 total interceptions, compared to the 25 that he had in his first four seasons. However, he was named to the Pro Bowl and selected as a second-team All-Pro four times after 1980. Hayes later stated that alongside lingering thumb injuries, the Stickum ban contributed to a decline in his later career. Biletnikoff and Jerry Rice, both of whom have admitted their usage of Stickum, have been inducted into the Pro Football Hall of Fame, while Hayes has not. He has been a finalist four times (2001–2004) and a semifinalist six times (2005–2010).

== Personal life ==
Early in his career, Hayes spoke with a stutter. However, in the spring of 1981, Hayes overcame his speech impediment with the benefit of speech pathologists at the Communications Research Center of Hollins College in Virginia, as he slowed down in speaking while dropping his voice level from E pitch to C.

A big Star Wars fan, during pregame interviews for Super Bowl XVIII, Hayes declared himself the "only true Jedi" in the NFL.

He moved to Modesto, California in 1994 for a more "quiet life."
