= Fireman Ed =

American sports fan

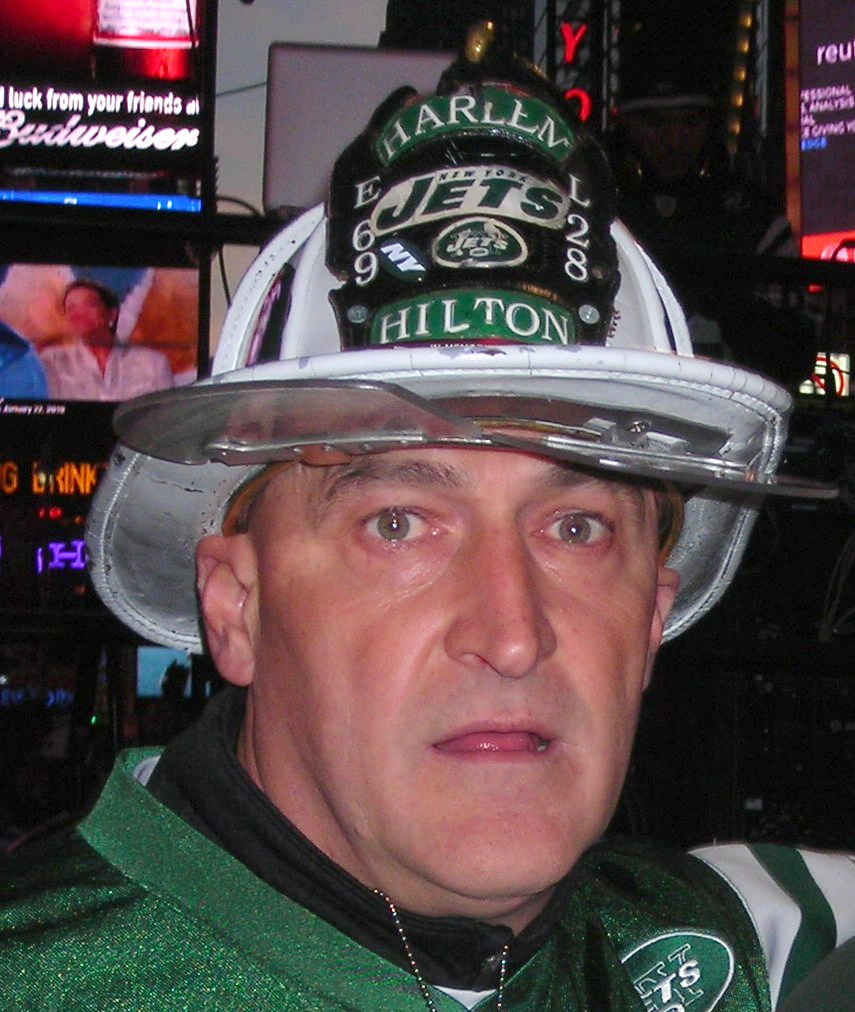
- Ed in 2010
- Born: Edwin M. Anzalone; September 19, 1959 (age 67); New York City, U.S.
- Known for: Leading chants at New York Jets games

Edwin M. Anzalone (born September 19, 1959), better known as Fireman Ed, is a fan of the New York Jets. He has risen to prominence by appearing on many local radio shows. He is known for leading the crowd in the team chant, "J-E-T-S, Jets!, Jets!, Jets!", which originally was led by two retired NYPD Jet fans – alternating from one end zone to the other end zone, in the upper deck only. An actual New York City firefighter, Fireman Ed was injured on the job in 2007. During the butt fumble game, a rout of the Jets by the New England Patriots on Thanksgiving night 2012, Anzalone left the game before halftime, stating that he would no longer lead cheers at Jet games as Fireman Ed. Since the first game of the 2015 NFL season, Fireman Ed has returned to lead cheers for the Jets.

== Fandom ==
Anzalone wears Bruce Harper's jersey to games. The exception was the 2012 NFL season, during which he wore Mark Sanchez's jersey in support of the quarterback. Anzalone began leading the J-E-T-S chant from Section 134 of the Meadowlands in 1986. He used to be hoisted up on the shoulders of his brother Frank, then later onto those of Bruce Gregor after Frank developed knee problems. In 1999, Fireman Ed was included in an exhibit at the Pro Football Hall of Fame as part of the Hall of Fans.

Ed's Harlem unit was deployed to assist in the survival and recovery efforts at the World Trade Center after the September 11 attacks. Anzalone lost many colleagues in the tragedy and attended numerous funerals for fallen firefighters. On October 1, 2001, he represented the FDNY during the coin toss at a New York Jets game against the Arizona Cardinals, wearing his uniform and a tribute t-shirt honoring those lost in the attacks.

On September 25, 2009, Fireman Ed was given a game ball from the Jets Week 2 victory over the New England Patriots. On December 30, 2009, Cincinnati Bengals wide receiver Chad Johnson claimed he would imitate Fireman Ed if he scored a touchdown in his next game against the Jets, on January 3, 2010. The day after the Bengals' loss in Week 17, Johnson got in contact with Fireman Ed through Twitter, and provided him with a VIP package for the Jets first round playoff game at Cincinnati as a way to make up for the "trash-talking" that occurred before the game. Anzalone appreciated the offer but declined it, on the moral ground that he did not think it was right to be flown out to the game by the opposing team. He did however say that if the Jets made him an offer he would take them up on it, though no such offer was made.

On November 22, 2012, during a Thanksgiving night Jets blowout 49–19 loss to the New England Patriots, Ed left the game at halftime and deleted his Twitter account. He "retired" as the self-proclaimed mascot of the New York Jets, stating he would attend games but not in character. He later explained that confrontations with a small number of Jets' fans had ruined the experience for him. The decision led to criticism that he had quit on the team, with some focus placed on Anzalone having been a fan of the Jets' division rival, the Miami Dolphins, before switching his allegiance to the Jets at age 10.

On September 13, 2015, Fireman Ed returned in character at the Jets' home opener against the Cleveland Browns, and he has continued this tradition as of the 2024 season.

== Controversy ==
On August 16, 2010, during a Monday Night Football Giants vs. Jets pre-season game, Fireman Ed's inaugural Jets chant in the New Meadowlands Stadium was interrupted by a Giants fan who raised his Giants hat while Fireman Ed's fellow Jets fans stood by. Fireman Ed repeatedly shoved the fan before the fan was escorted away from Ed's chanting post. The Giants fan was later removed from the game. Fireman Ed was charged with simple assault for the incident, but the charges were later dropped.

== Personal life ==
Anzalone has also been a resident of East Rutherford, New Jersey.

== See also ==
- The 7 Line Army
- Barrel Man
- Bleacher Creatures
- Chief Zee
- Crazy Ray
- Hogettes
- License Plate Guy
- Pinto Ron
