= Mud Bowl =

Mud Bowl can refer to various sporting events which occur or have occurred in muddy conditions, including:

- The 38th Grey Cup championship in Toronto in 1950, between the Toronto Argonauts and the Winnipeg Blue Bombers
- A 1977 NFC playoff game between the Minnesota Vikings and the Los Angeles Rams
- The 1983 AFC Championship Game, between the Miami Dolphins and the New York Jets
- A 1997 Divisional Playoff game, between the San Francisco 49ers and Green Bay Packers
- The 2007 matchup between the Miami Dolphins and the Pittsburgh Steelers, where the Steelers won 3–0.

Mud Bowl may also refer to

- Mud Bowl (Friday Night Lights), an episode of the TV series Friday Night Lights
