= Abe Woodson =

American football player (1934–2014)

- Woodson in 1961

No. 40, 42
- Positions: Cornerback, return specialist, halfback

Personal information
- Born: February 15, 1934; Jackson, Mississippi, U.S.
- Died: February 8, 2014 (aged 79); Las Vegas, Nevada, U.S.
- Listed height: 5 ft 11 in (1.80 m)
- Listed weight: 188 lb (85 kg)

Career information
- High school: Austin (Chicago, Illinois)
- College: Illinois
- NFL draft: 1957: 2nd round, 15th overall pick

Career history
- San Francisco 49ers (1958–1964); St. Louis Cardinals (1965–1966)

Awards and highlights
- 2× First-team All-Pro (1959–1960); Second-team All-Pro (1963); 5× Pro Bowl (1959–1963); NFL kickoff return yards leader (1962); First-team All-Big Ten (1956)

Career NFL statistics
- Interceptions: 19
- Fumble recoveries: 15
- Return yards: 6,494
- Total touchdowns: 8
- Stats at Pro Football Reference

Abraham Benjamin Woodson (February 15, 1934 – February 8, 2014) was an American professional football cornerback and kick returner who played nine seasons in the National Football League (NFL), mainly with the San Francisco 49ers. He also spent two years with the St. Louis Cardinals.

He is considered a progenitor of the bump and run coverage technique as a defensive back, was selected to five consecutive Pro Bowls and multiple All Pro teams, led the NFL in kick return average three times and returned five kickoffs for touchdowns over his career. In 2021, the Professional Football Researchers Association named Woodson to the PFRA Hall of Very Good Class of 2021.

Sports Illustrated described him at cornerback as "one of the rare players who has waterbug reflexes, greyhound speed and an appetite for tackling."

== Early life ==
Woodson was born on February 15, 1934, in Jackson, Mississippi. He moved to Chicago at a young age, and played high school football for Austin High School in Chicago, as a runner, passer and punter. Woodson's team was the Public League Champion in 1952, and he was the top selection at All-State halfback of the Chicago Daily News All-State Football Board. In 1952, he also was awarded the Noble Kizer trophy by the Purdue Club of Chicago. As a member of the school's track team, Woodson was the 1952 state champion in the 120-yard high hurdles.

== College ==
Woodson attended the University of Illinois (1953-1957) where he starred in both football and track. As a track star he set or tied the world record for indoor 50-yard high hurdles twice during his time at Illinois. He was also a Big-Ten 70-yard low hurdle champion. He was a two-time Big Ten sprinting champion. Woodson missed making the 1956 Olympic hurdling team by one spot.

Woodson was a two-way player on the football team, at running back and defensive back (in 2008, being named one of the school's greatest defensive backs). He was also a punter and a kick returner.

In 1956, as a running back, he rushed for 599 yards in 110 attempts (5.4 yards per attempt), and caught a team-leading 12 passes for 257 yards (21.4 yards per receptions) with two touchdowns. He had been leading the Big-Ten in rushing that year, but an injury kept him out of the last two games, and he came in second.

His most memorable game for the Illini came against No. 1 ranked Michigan State on October 27, 1956. Illinois was losing 13–0 at halftime, and Woodson scored three second half touchdowns to win the game 20–13, with a total of 271 yards on 20 touches. One touchdown came on a 70-yard run and another on a spectacular 82-yard reception on a screen pass. A panel of Illinois Alumni experts selected this game as the sixth greatest moment in Illinois football history.

Woodson was selected an All-American and first-team All-Big Ten in 1956. He was the 1957 Illini Athlete of the Year for football and track. He also played in the East West Shrine game.

He has been listed at NFL.com as one of the top 10 Illinois players of all time. Among Woodson's Illinois teammates was future Hall of Fame linebacker Ray Nitschke.

== Professional career ==
=== San Francisco 49ers ===
Woodson was selected by the San Francisco 49ers in the second round of the 1957 NFL draft (15th overall), but could not play for the team until he fulfilled his military service commitment. Thus, his rookie year came in 1958. The Niners were a year removed from being one game away from reaching the 1957 Championship Game (losing to the eventual champion Detroit Lions). In a November 30, 1958 game against the eventual champion Baltimore Colts, the 49ers had a 27–7 halftime lead, but wound up losing 35–27.

The Niners never finished above third during Woodson's tenure (1958-64), with a record never better than 7–5; but Woodson was an excellent player on a mediocre team. After starting three games in his rookie season, he was generally a full-time starter at cornerback over the next six years. He was selected to the Pro Bowl as a defensive back every year from 1959-1963. He was named first-team All-Pro by the Associated Press (AP) and United Press International (UPI) in 1959; first-team All-Pro by the Newspaper Enterprise Association (NEA), and second-team All-Pro by the AP and UPI in 1960; first-team All-Pro by the NEA and second-team All-Pro by UPI in 1962; and first-team All-Pro by the NEA and second-team All-Pro by the AP in 1963.

While achieving these accolades, Woodson only had 12 interceptions during his prime years with the 49ers (1959-63), and never more than four in a season. Woodson's interception numbers were relatively low, however, because quarterbacks did not throw in his direction due to his coverage ability that allowed him to play tight defense on receivers and prevent their getting open to catch passes. With his great speed and athleticism, he was able to defend receivers beginning at the line of scrimmage, eliminating their ability to make moves downfield; on the theory that he would control the play's development, not the receiver.

Former Cardinals teammate, 17-year veteran and Pro Bowl cornerback Pat Fischer believed that the bump and run coverage technique originated with Woodson, from whom Fischer learned it; and that it did not begin with himself or AFL great Willie Brown (though Fischer also later said he learned it from Jimmy Hill). Woodson was also an excellent defender on running plays, unafraid of facing the likes of powerful Hall of Fame runners Jim Brown or Jim Taylor, or speedy and elusive runners like Gale Sayers.

Woodson also excelled as a kickoff returner as a 49er. He led the NFL with kickoff return averages of 29.4 yards per return (1959), 31.3 yards per return (1962), and 32.2 yards per return (1963). In 1963, he returned three kickoffs for touchdowns, including a 103-yard touchdown return (both league leading numbers). In 1959, he had a league best 105-yard touchdown return; and in 1961 he had a 98-yard touchdown return.

Woodson also returned punts. In 1962, he was fourth in the league with a 9.4 yards per return average, with a touchdown return of 85 yards. In 1959, Woodson averaged 9.5 yards per return; in 1960, 13.4 yards per return, with a league leading 48-yard return and 174 total return yards; and in 1961, he averaged 10.8 yards per return.

In 1961, 49ers coach Red Hickey was trying to develop a shotgun offense, and utilized Woodson as a halfback, but it was a limited use, as Woodson only had 14 rushing attempts and eight receptions.

=== St. Louis Cardinals ===
Woodson was traded in 1965 to the St. Louis Cardinals for running back John David Crow. He would play two final seasons in St. Louis, with the team finishing with a record of 5–9 in 1965, but narrowly missing the post-season with a 8–5–1 in 1966. He tied his career high with four interceptions in 1966. The Cardinals 1966 defensive backfield included Woodson, Fischer, Hall of fame safety Larry Wilson, Pro Bowl safety Jerry Stovall and Jimmy Burson who combined for 20 interceptions. The Cardinals gave up the third fewest passing yards in the NFL that year (2,300), even though they faced the third highest number of passes (443). Opponents only completed 197 of those passes (a league best 44.5% completion rate).

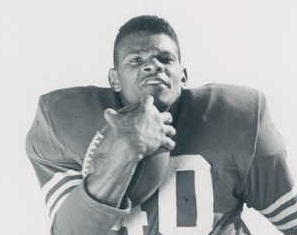
Woodson in 1964

=== Career ===
At the time of his retirement after the 1966 NFL season, Woodson held career records for the most times leading the NFL in kickoff returns (3), most kickoff returns (193), and most yards gained from kickoff returns (5,538), and was second in kickoff returns for touchdowns (5). As of 2024, he is tied for 9th all time in touchdown returns. As of the end of the 2024 NFL season, Woodson's career average of 28.7 yards per return ranks fifth on the NFL's all-time list for those with a minimum of 75 returns.

Woodson was also dangerous on punt returns, averaging 9 yards per return in his prime with the 49ers.

== Personal life ==
During his career, he was on the board of directors of the Hunters Point Boys Club (as was Willie Mays).

After leaving football, he worked as a life insurance agent. He later lived in Las Vegas, where he served as a prison minister in connection with the Churches of Christ.

== Death ==
Woodson died on February 8, 2014, aged 79.
