= Hogettes =

Group of fans of the Washington Commanders

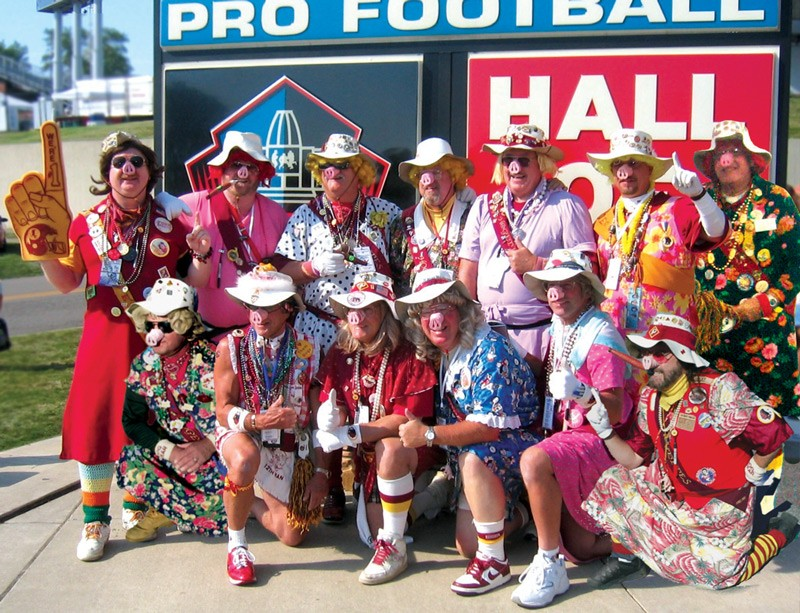
Hogettes in 2004

The Hogettes were a group of fans of the Washington Redskins (now known as the Washington Commanders) who wore women's dresses, garden party hats, and pig snouts. The group was founded in 1983 by Michael Torbert and became a regular fixture at Redskins games for nearly 30 years. When the group announced its retirement following the 2012 season, it had over 20 members, including three who have been featured in an exhibit at the Pro Football Hall of Fame.

The group retains a high profile largely because of their outrageous costumes, but also because of their frequent work for charitable organizations. The Hogettes have appeared in a national advertising campaign for Visa, and they provide support for many charities, including Children's Miracle Network, Ronald McDonald House, and March of Dimes. They raised over US$100 million for these and other charitable causes.

== History ==
The Hogettes were founded in 1983 when Michael Torbert went to a Halloween party at his grandmother's retirement home wearing one of her old dresses as a costume. The costume was such a hit that he gathered a group of men who he "thought were tough enough to go out in public in a dress". On November 27, 1983, the group attended their first Washington Redskins football game in full drag, but with the addition of pig snout masks, in reference to The Hogs, the nickname of the Redskins offensive line players in the 1980s. The group would also go to children's hospitals to cheer up sick children.

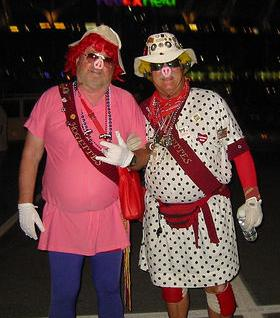
"Big Georgette" and "Boss Hog" in front of the Washington Redskins' FedExField.

Led by Torbert, also known as "Boss Hogette", the group became regular fixtures at Redskins home games, both at their old home of RFK Stadium and their new home of FedExField. The group made more than 100 appearances each year for charitable events, and Torbert and two other Hogettes were inducted into the Pro Football Hall of Fame as "ultimate" Redskins fans. There were a total of 27 members of the group from 1983 to 2012. Though they have considerable notoriety, they received no special treatment or official recognition from the Redskins. Following the 2012 NFL season, Tolbert announced that after 30 years, the Hogettes would be officially retiring. The members remain fans of the team, and continue to do charity work in the Washington metropolitan area.

=== Origin of the name ===
In the 1980s, the Washington Redskins' offensive line coach, Joe Bugel, began to refer to his linemen as "Hogs". The Hogs were credited for much of the Redskins success in the 1980s and early 1990s, including four Super Bowl appearances and three Super Bowl wins in a 10-season period from 1982 to 1991. The group began wearing pig noses and named themselves "The Hogettes" in reference to the Hogs and to the Washington Redskins' official cheerleaders, originally known as the "Redskinettes."

== Philanthropy ==
The Hogettes organized and attended charitable events in the Washington, D.C., area for over twenty years. In that time, they helped raise more than US$100 million for various charities, including Children's Miracle Network, Ronald McDonald House, and March of Dimes. Upon reaching this landmark value, Howard "Howiette" Churchill remarked, "That's a lot of money for a bunch of fat old grandpas in pig noses and dresses." Among these events were golf tournaments, including the Hogettes' annual charity golf tournament, walk-a-thons, truck rallies, galas, and other charity benefits.

While some of their charitable efforts went toward helping their local community, most of the money they raise goes toward helping children. "Hogette for a Game" was an annual fund raiser. In 1995, Nick "Nickette" Nerangis' wife bought him this package. He subsequently became a substitute Hogette for several years before becoming an official member in 2002. One female fan has, for several years, served as "Hogette for a Game" through winning annual auctions. In 2000, she raised more than $11,000 for children's charities in order to attend one game with the Hogettes that season.

In an online interview with fans, Torbert stated "You... have to have a sense of humor for many things from day to day. It is tough to be humorous when the [Redskins] lose, but it's even tougher to face a sick child in a hospital room, and cheer them up with our humorous looks. That's tough."

== National exposure ==
In addition to gaining national exposure through their outrageous costumes and continuous work with charitable organizations, the Hogettes were guests on The Tonight Show with Jay Leno, and were featured in a Visa television commercial. Despite their generous philanthropy and positive attitude in the stands, not everyone appreciated the Hogettes. Former team owners Jack Kent Cooke and Daniel Snyder both failed to embrace the Hogettes. The group was called "incredibly obnoxious" and "annoying", and were attacked in the infamous 700 Level at Veterans Stadium in Philadelphia by angry Philadelphia Eagles fans.
