= Thundersticks =

Noise makers

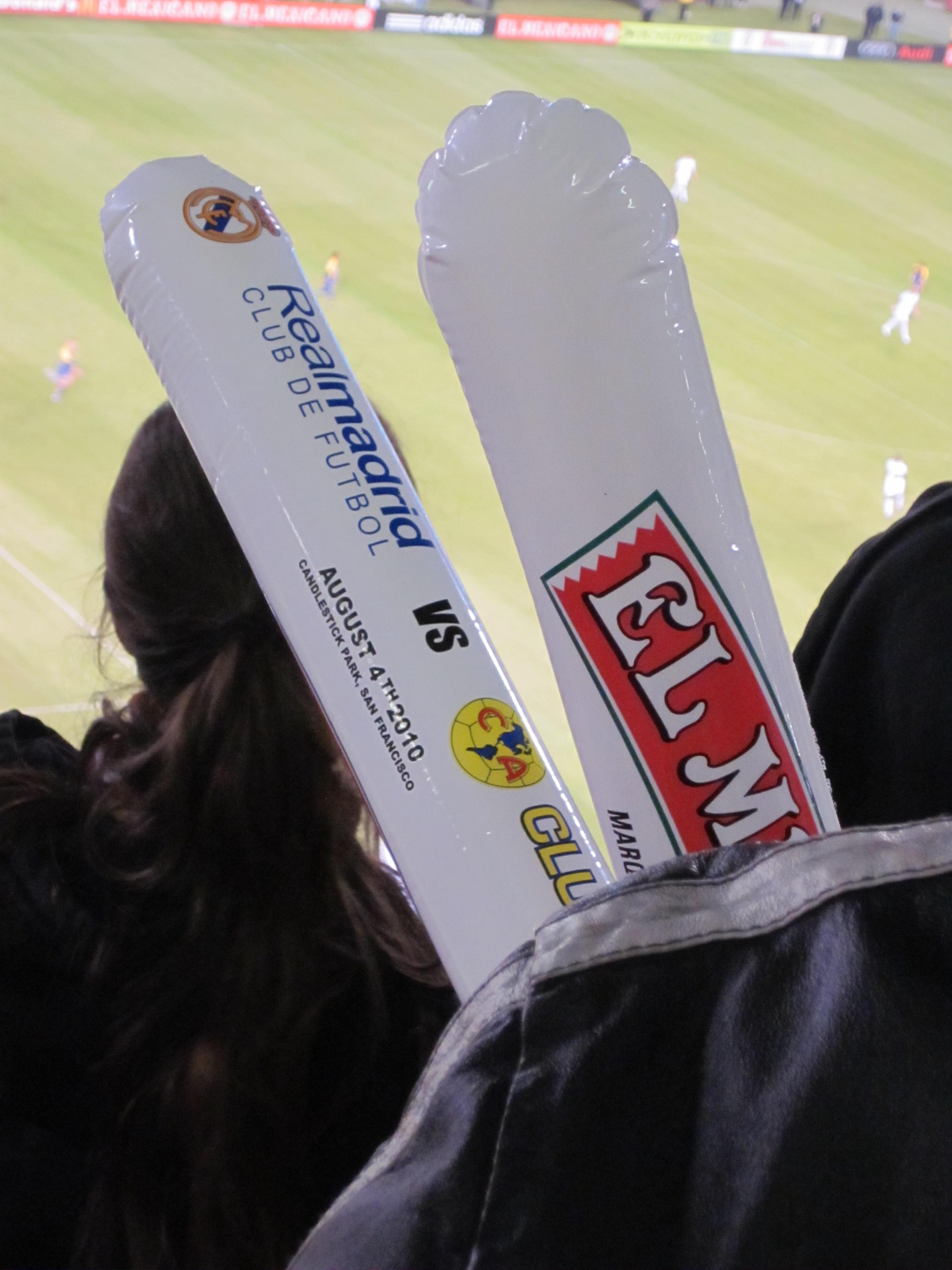
Thundersticks branded for the Real Madrid soccer team

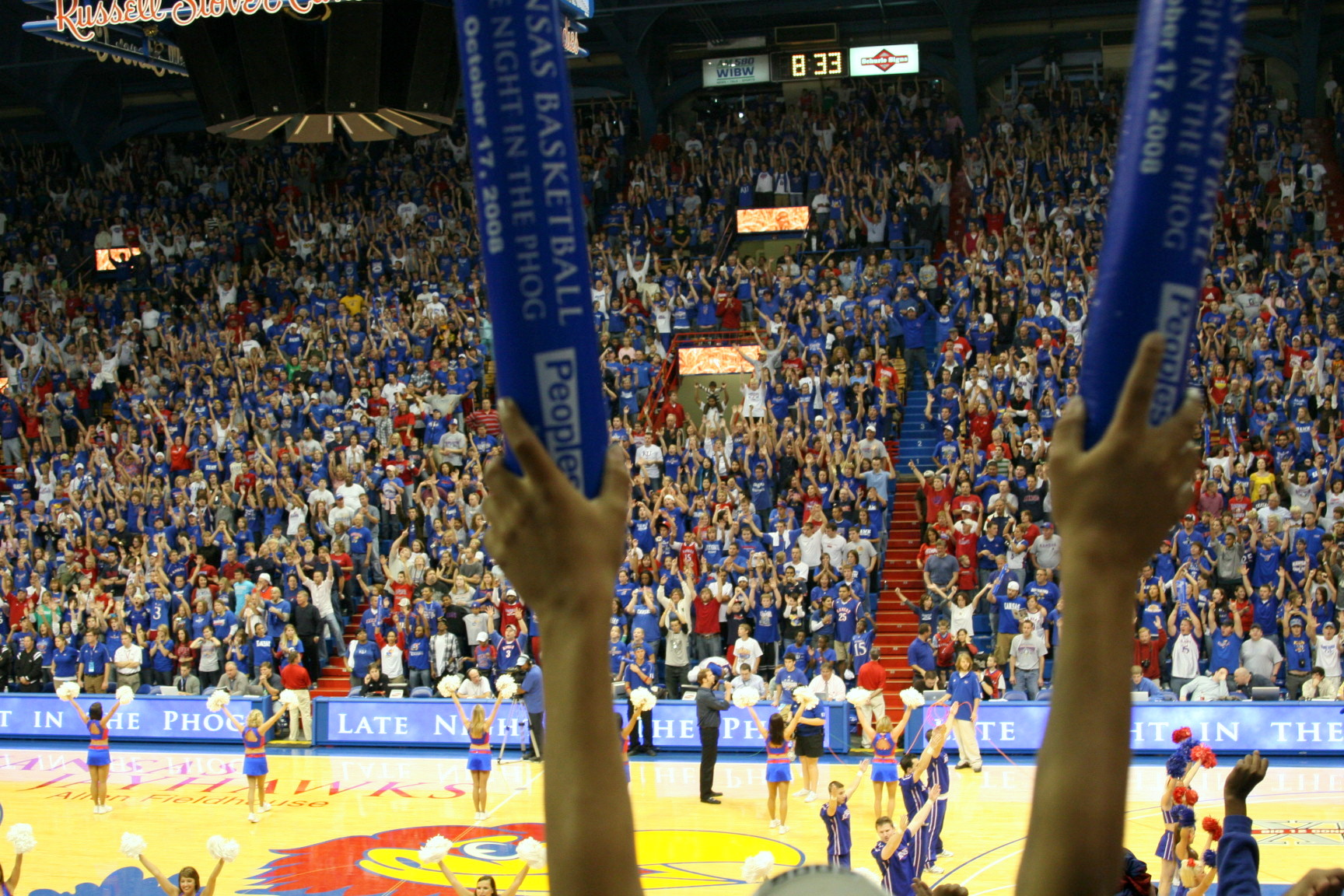
Supporters of the Kansas Jayhawks men's basketball celebrate Late Night at the Phog with thundersticks.

Thundersticks, sometimes known as bambams, are long, narrow plastic balloons that are used as promotional noise makers. The noise is created when two thundersticks are struck together. They are most often used at sporting events.

== Origin and popularity ==
Thundersticks, known as makdae pungseon (Korean: 막대풍선, lit. 'stick balloons') in South Korea, were created by BalloonStix Korea and first used in 1994 at an LG Twins baseball game. They later gained popularity in North America when they were used by fans of the Anaheim Angels during the 2002 World Series. Today thundersticks are used by fans of many sports teams in order to show their support, serving a similar purpose as the Homer Hanky associated with the Minnesota Twins and the Terrible Towel associated with the Pittsburgh Steelers.

Thundersticks have appeared around the world at many sporting events. They are regularly seen in baseball games in Taiwan, basketball games in the Philippines, and football matches throughout Europe, but sometimes under different names such as "bangers".

== See also ==
- Boomwhacker
- Handy horn
- Homer Hanky
- Inflatable
- List of inflatable manufactured goods
- Terrible Towel
- Vuvuzela
