= Morganza =

Morganza may refer to:

- Morganza, Louisiana, incorporated village
- Morganza, Maryland, unincorporated community
- Morganza Spillway, flood-control structure in the U.S. state of Louisiana, near Morganza
- A colloquial name for Western State School and Hospital in Pennsylvania
