= Western Center (disambiguation) =

Western Center was a state-run mental hospital and reform school in Pennsylvania.

Western Center may also refer to:

- Western Center Riograndense, a Mesoregions of the state of Rio Grande do Sul in Brazil.
- Western Center for Archaeology & Paleontology, a museum located near Diamond Valley Lake in Hemet, California.
- Western Center for Journalism, a conservative advocacy group in California.
