= Towel Power =

Vancouver Canucks hockey fan tradition

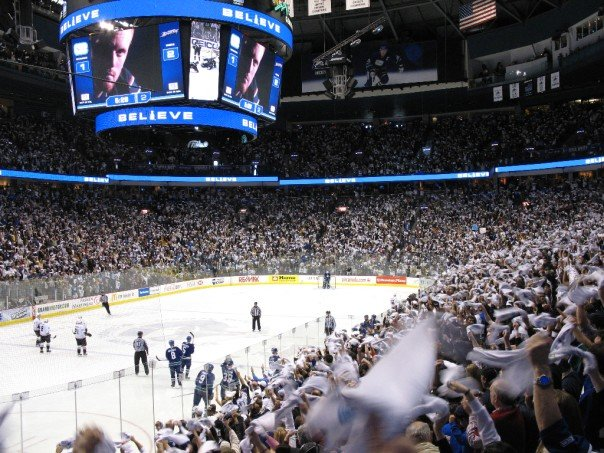
Towel Power in Vancouver during the Canucks' 2007 NHL Playoffs

Towel Power is a term used by the Vancouver Canucks of the National Hockey League (NHL) to describe the waving of rally towels by their fans. The tradition started in the 1982 Campbell Conference Finals when Vancouver played the Chicago Blackhawks. During game two of the series, head coach Roger Neilson waved a white towel on the end of a hockey stick in a mock surrender after being upset with the officiating. Neilson was ejected and the Canucks lost 4–1. When Vancouver returned home from Chicago for the following game fans supported both Neilson and the Canucks by waving towels first at the airport when the team arrived and then during the next game. The Canucks won the next three games and advanced to the Stanley Cup Finals where they were defeated by the New York Islanders. As part of the tradition, the Canucks hand out towels prior to playoff games for fans to help support the team.

== History ==
=== Background ===
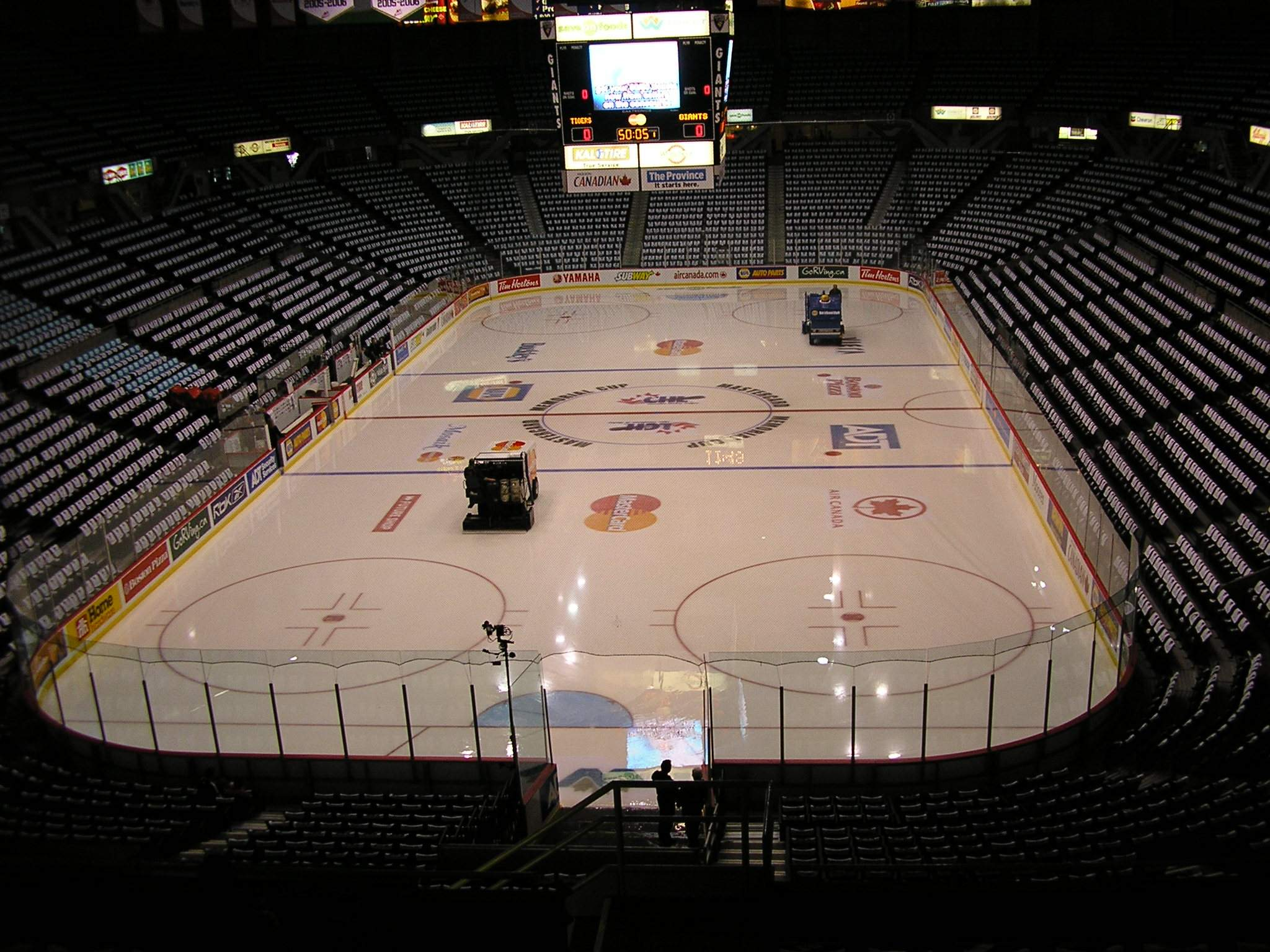
Towels laid out on each seat at the Pacific Coliseum prior to the 2007 Memorial Cup final in Vancouver.

Late in the 1981–82 season the Vancouver Canucks played a game against the Quebec Nordiques in Quebec City. During the game Canucks' enforcer Tiger Williams was punched by a fan. In response Canucks' head coach Harry Neale went into the crowd to "get the fan" and a few players followed suit. For his actions NHL President John Ziegler suspended Neale for 10 games that began with six games remaining in the season and first four playoff games. Therefore, assistant coach Roger Neilson took over the head coaching duties for Neale. Vancouver finished the year with a 30–33–17 record, second in the Smythe Division, and qualified for the playoffs. Despite the losing record, the Canucks finished the year with an eight-game unbeaten streak, which continued into their first round match-up with the Calgary Flames. Vancouver swept the Flames in three straight games advancing to the second round where they faced the Los Angeles Kings. With Canucks' General Manager Jake Milford retiring and Neale set to replace him, Neale told Milford to keep Neilson as head coach permanently, believing the team had bonded under his guidance. With Neilson remaining as head coach, the Canucks eliminated the Kings in five games and advanced to the Campbell Conference Finals against the Chicago Blackhawks.

=== Incident ===
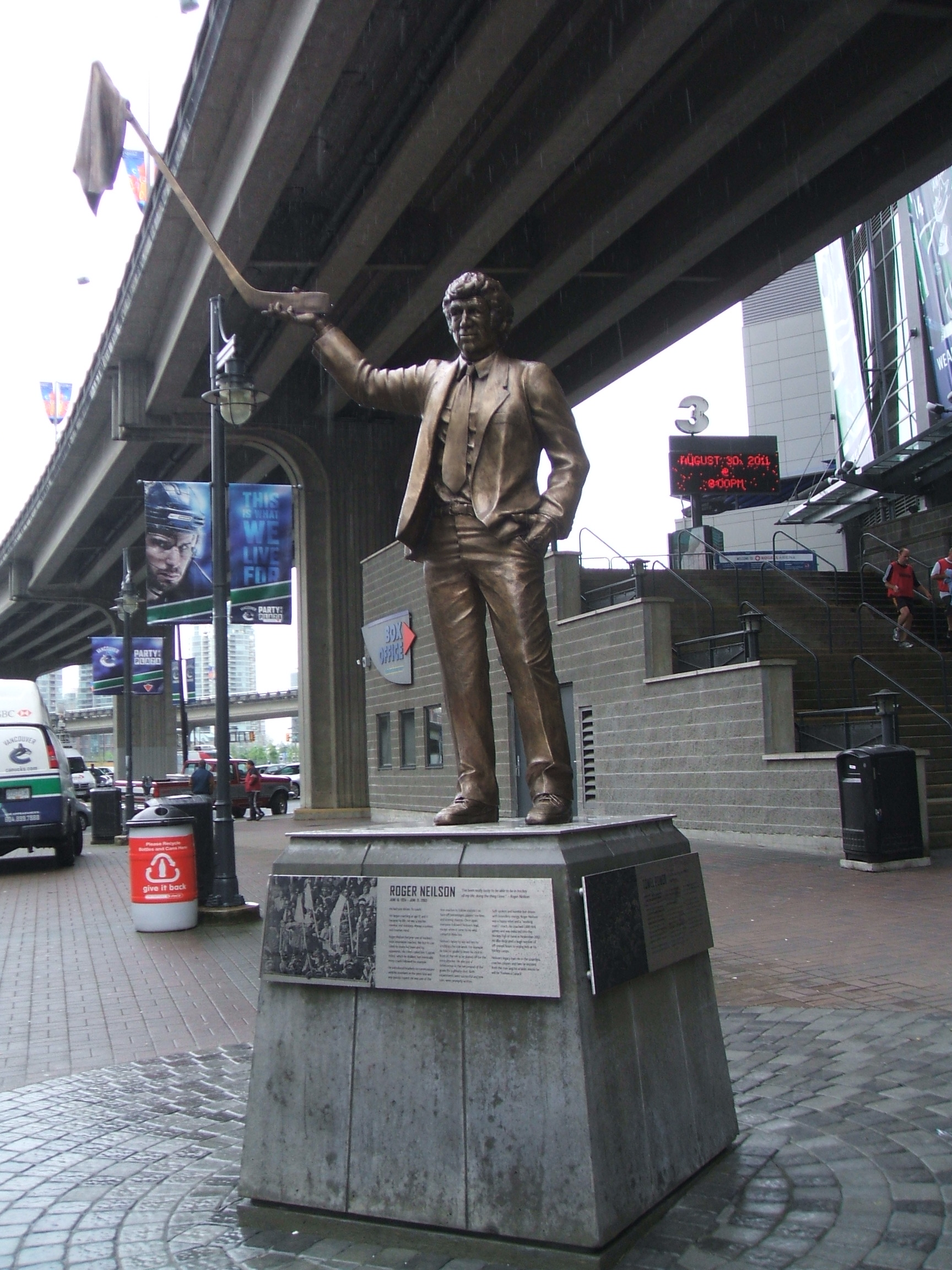
Neilson's statue depicting the beginning of Towel Power

Vancouver won the first game of the series in Chicago 2–1 in double overtime, but fell behind in game two 3–1. During the game the Canucks felt that referee Bob Myers was making questionable calls against them. A series of events in the third period ignited tempers. First, Vancouver had a goal disallowed. Soon after, there was a perceived non-call against Chicago, followed by a fourth consecutive penalty called against the Canucks. Denis Savard scored on the power play to put the Black Hawks up 4–1. This enraged the Canucks' bench. Assistant coach Ron Smith yelled out "We give up, we surrender, we give up." Williams suggested to Neilson that he throw sticks onto the ice in protest. Neilson noted that he had done that before, and he had a better idea. He proceeded to take a white towel and place it on the end of a hockey stick holding it up in a mock surrender; some of the Canucks' players followed suit. Neilson was ejected from the game along with two players. Vancouver goaltender, Richard Brodeur later noted that although they lost the game the atmosphere in the dressing room was so positive it was as if they had won.

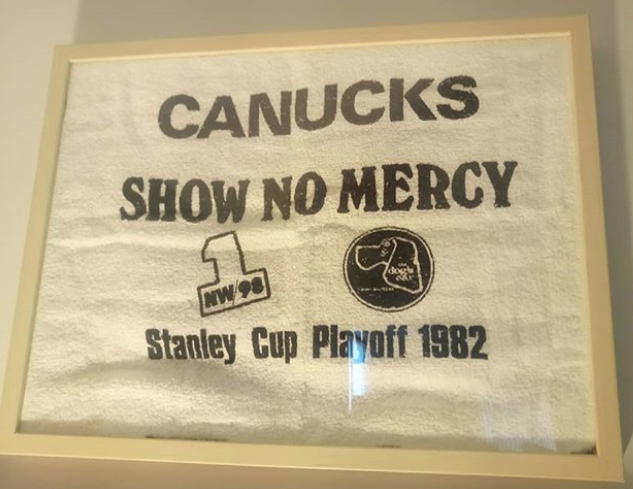
Original towel from game 4 against the Chicago Blackhawks in the 1982 playoffs.

=== Aftermath ===
Neilson was fined $1,000 and the franchise was fined $10,000 as a result of the incident. Myers later called Neilson's action "bush league". While NHL executive vice-president Brian O'Neill stated that the mock surrender "disgraced the championship series," Canucks' captain, Stan Smyl, noted that several players were "surprised" by Neilson's action because the coach had always been "respectful", and it was an "extreme way for him to react".

When the Canucks returned home, they were greeted by fans at the airport waving towels in support of the team. During game three, fans waved towels to show support for the Canucks. Former professional football player, wrestler, and five time world belly flop champion Butts Giraud got permission from the team to start selling towels with the phrase "Canucks Take no Survivors". He initially had 5,000 of them made at $1 apiece and sold 1,000 of them right away, proceeds going to charity. Giraud would sell 30,000 towels personally; the proceeds for charity amounted to $23,000. Vancouver won game three 4–3 to take the lead in the series. For game four there were more fans waving towels as the Canucks won again 5–3. Vancouver won game five in Chicago and advanced to the Stanley Cup Finals, where they were swept by the New York Islanders.

To continue the tradition, the organization produces 20,500 white towels with the Canucks logo for each playoff game. Following his first playoff game in 2007 Vancouver forward Alex Burrows stated "It looks like the fans are really into the game and the atmosphere out there is something else, people are really passionate instead of just sitting and no one moving or anything like some places. It just creates movement and it seems like there is more enthusiasm and intensity in the building." As part of their 40th season celebration the Canucks organization commissioned a permanent statue of Neilson. Standing over 11 feet tall and weighing over 800 pounds, the bronze statue depicts Neilson's mock surrender which started towel power. During their 50th season celebration, the Canucks again acknowledged Neilson's creation of the tradition, this time in a pre-game ceremony where five players from the 1982 Canucks team reenacted the mock surrender at centre ice.

The first use of rally towels in professional sports was the Pittsburgh Steelers football team's Terrible Towel, in 1975. Minnesota Twins first used Homer Hanky towels in 1987. In recent years, other NHL hockey teams have used rally towels at home games, including the Anaheim Ducks Fowl Towels.
