= Tarps Off =

Viral sports trend

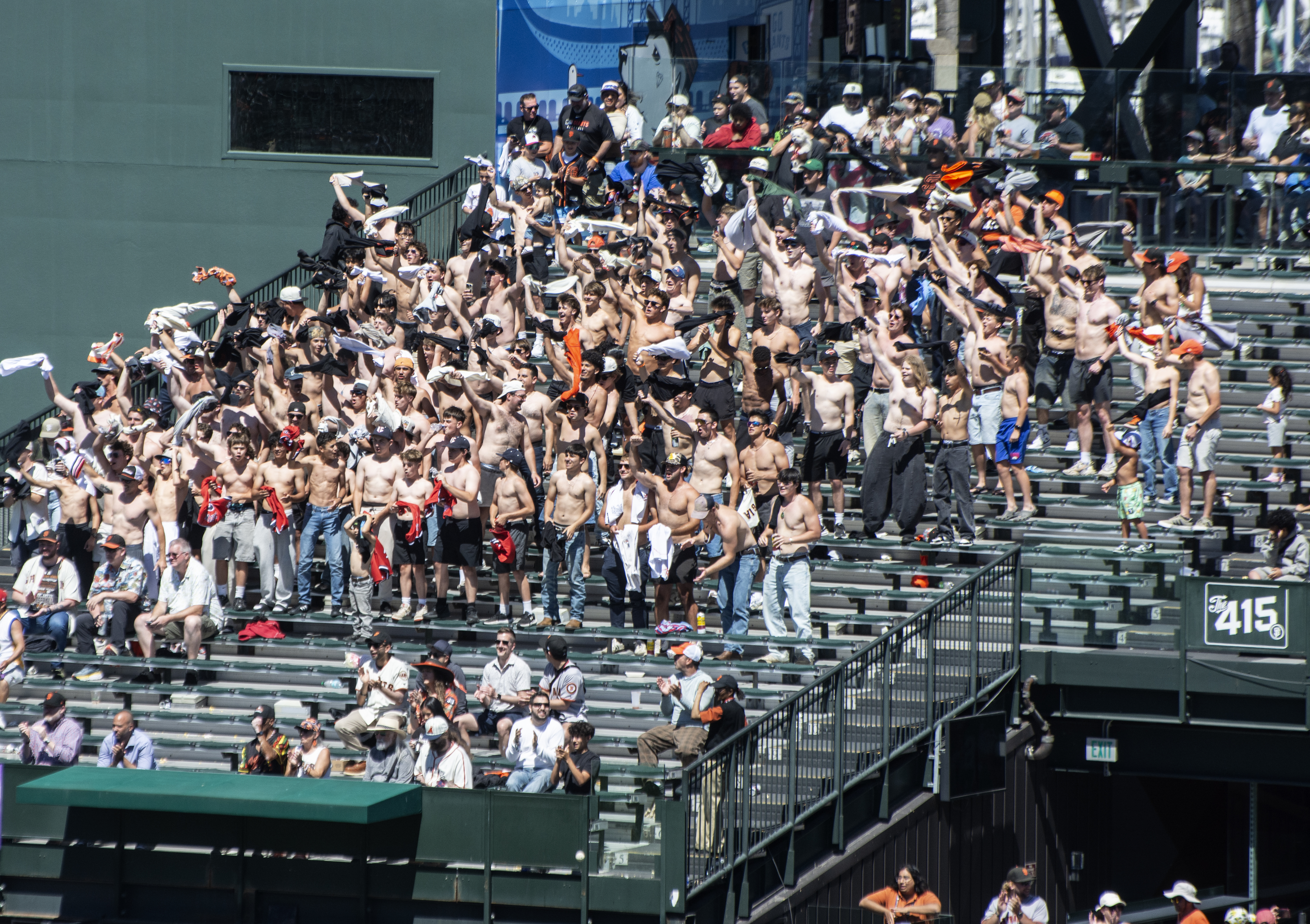
Fans with "Tarps Off" at Oracle Park in June 2026

Tarps Off is a viral trend where spectators at sporting events remove their shirts and wave or twirl them overhead like rally towels to support their team. It has been described as "guys being dudes" and a way to connect with other fans.

== Origin and impact ==
In association football, it is common that supporters' groups remove their shirts in moments of celebration or as part of their chants. One of the earliest instances of fans removing their shirts and using them as towels during games came in the 1990's from supporters of Newcastle United F.C., a survey conducted in 2015 revealed that Newcastle fans are more likely to go shirtless, even in adverse weather conditions such as rain or snow.

In college football, the trend began on October 11, 2025, during an Oklahoma State Cowboys game at Boone Pickens Stadium, which the Cowboys were losing to the Houston Cougars. A fan, Trent Eaton, accepted a dare for $10 from his sister to go to Section 231, which was empty, take off his shirt, and wave it over his head. As the game progressed, hundreds of fans joined Eaton in waving their shirts over their heads. Video clips went viral on social media and the trend continued at Oklahoma State in following weeks and spread to other universities during the college football season, starting with teams that were struggling against their competition. Oklahoma State dubbed the section "2-No-Shirty-1".

The trend grew during the 2026 Major League Baseball (MLB) season, starting with the Colorado Rockies game on April 8. The club baseball team of Stephen F. Austin State University, who were competing in St. Louis, attended a St. Louis Cardinals game on May 15 and engaged in the trend. The Cardinals rallied to defeat the Kansas City Royals in a walk-off. Cardinals' manager Oliver Marmol noticed the fans, and bought tickets for the team to attend the following day's game and invited the fans into their team's clubhouse. The Cardinals have since dedicated a section in the right field bleachers at Busch Stadium as a "dedicated high-energy fan section". It spread to other MLB teams and the 2026 Men's College World Series. Seth Jarvis of the Carolina Hurricanes of the National Hockey League credited the trend with helping energize them during their comeback in Game 2 of the 2026 Stanley Cup Final against the Vegas Golden Knights.

== See also ==
- Nude recreation § Nudity in sports
- Toplessness § Barechestedness
- Terrible Towel
