= Rally towel =

Promotional towels

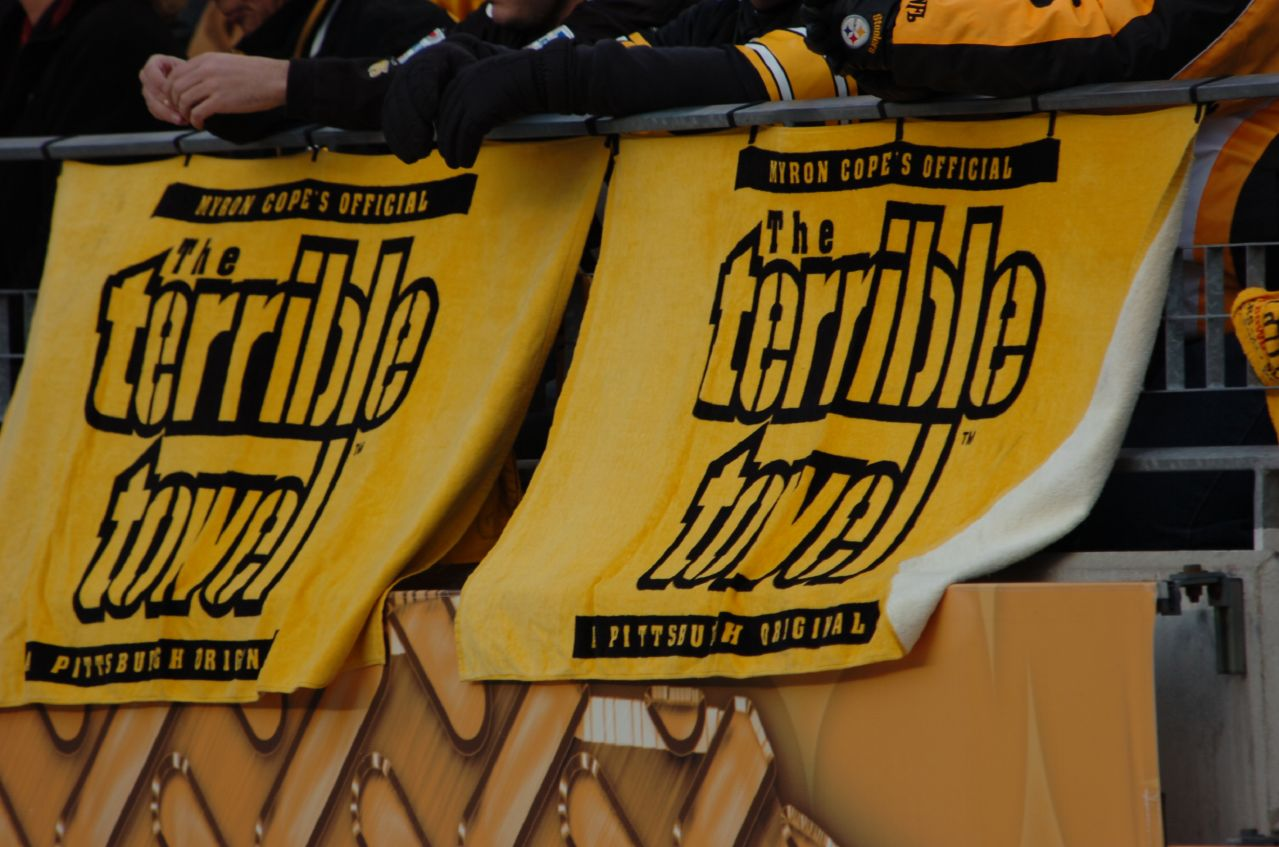
Two Terrible Towels at a Pittsburgh Steelers game

A rally towel is a sports paraphernalia item and a type of towel often used as a fan symbol, in bannerlike fashion, in American and Canadian sports events. The prototype of the modern rally towel was created in 1975 by former Pittsburgh Steelers radio broadcaster Myron Cope and is known as the Terrible Towel. It could be argued the coach E. A. Diddle of the Western Kentucky Hilltoppers created the first rally towel in the 1940s. Western Kentucky trademarked the term "The Red Towel" in 1971, four years before Cope created the Terrible Towel.

Since the Terrible Towel's debut, teams have used similar gimmicks, mainly using white towels (or towels with the team's colors) and giving them out to fans. The main time teams give rally towels is during league postseasons. Towels have gained much popularity as distractions to visiting players. Teams that use rally towels include the NFL's Seattle Seahawks, New England Patriots, and New York Jets, the NHL's Anaheim Ducks, Montreal Canadiens, Vancouver Canucks, San Jose Sharks, Pittsburgh Penguins, New York Islanders, New York Rangers, New Jersey Devils, Carolina Hurricanes, and Dallas Stars, the NBA's Cleveland Cavaliers, Memphis Grizzlies and Oklahoma City Thunder, the MLB's Detroit Tigers, San Francisco Giants, Toronto Blue Jays, Philadelphia Phillies, Texas Rangers, Minnesota Twins, Los Angeles Dodgers, New York Mets, Houston Astros, and the Washington Nationals, and the NCAA basketball Duke Blue Devils.

== History ==
Though not known as a rally towel at the time — the concept had not been introduced yet — one of the first recorded regular similar uses of a towel was at Western Kentucky University, where basketball coach E. A. Diddle waved a red towel on the sideline during games. Diddle, who coached at WKU from 1922 to 1964, originally used a plain white towel; the red towel came as a result of an effort to keep students from pilfering towels from the physical education department. A logo featuring the towel is now used by the school's sports teams, most prominently on football helmets.

On December 27, 1975, the Pittsburgh Steelers entered the NFL playoffs against the Baltimore Colts. Two weeks prior to the game, the team's flagship radio station, WTAE, decided to create a gimmick to attract sponsors, with the help of Myron Cope, the Steelers radio broadcaster. They soon hit upon the idea of the Terrible Towel – a gold or yellow towel with the words "The Terrible Towel" printed on the front – which would be marketed to Steelers fans. The idea was criticized by the Steelers and the local press, but on the day of the game, as Cope later recalled: "...the Steelers gathered in the tunnel for introductions, whereupon the crowd exploded—and suddenly, by my estimation, 30,000 Terrible Towels twirled from the fists of fans around the stadium!" The Steelers not only won the game, but went on to win the Super Bowl for the second year running.

Rally towels came to professional hockey by accident in 1982. Outraged by a string of unfavorable calls in a road game during the conference finals, Vancouver Canucks coach Roger Neilson draped a white towel over a player's stick and waved it above his bench in mock surrender. Neilson was ejected and the Canucks lost the game, but the incident restored the team's morale. Fans started waving white towels—first at the airport when the team returned to Vancouver, then at the next game—and "Towel Power" propelled the Canucks to victory in the series.

The first rally towels in baseball came from the Minnesota Twins. The Homer Hanky first appeared during the Twins playoff run in 1987, when they won the World Series.

== Present day ==
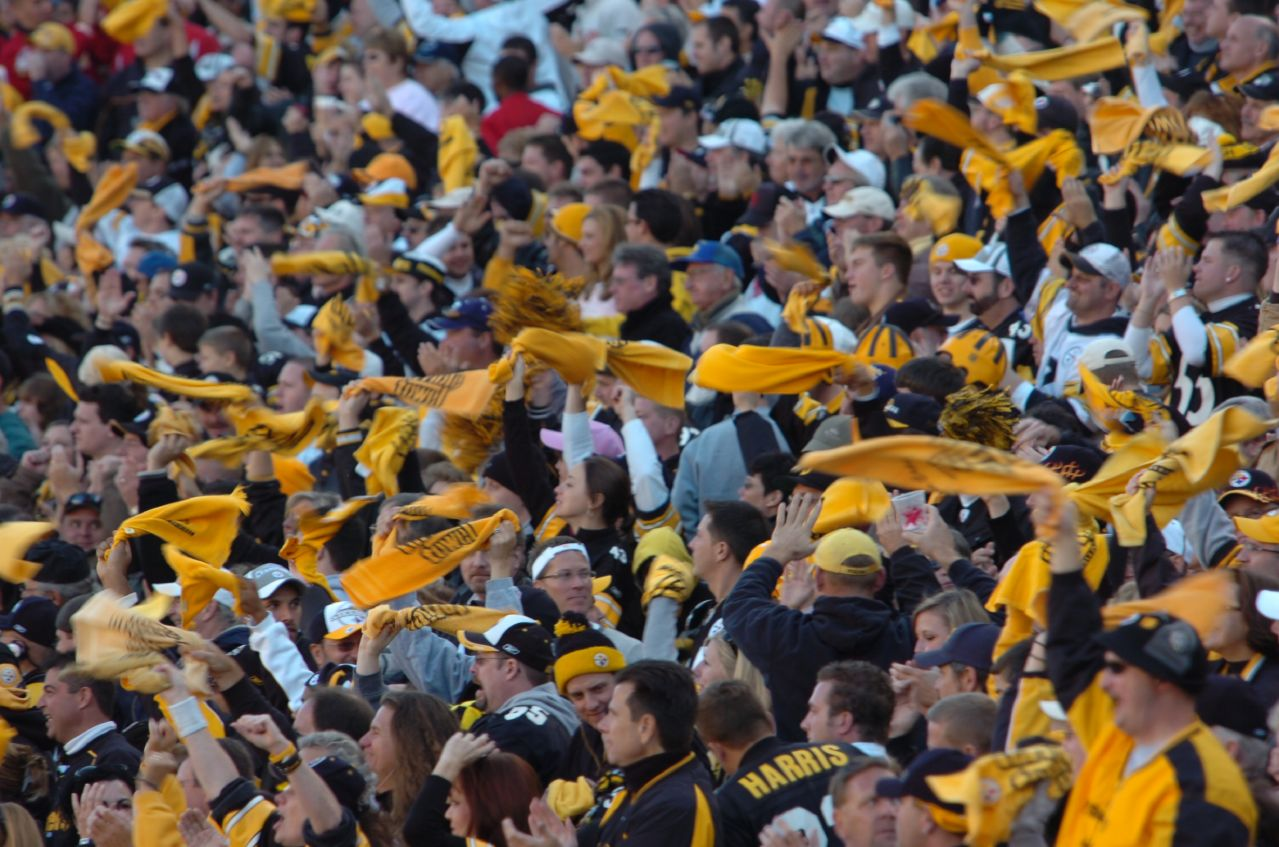
Steelers fans wave rally towels at Heinz Field – October 15, 2006

Today, rally towels are seen in all four major American sports leagues (MLB, NBA, NFL, and NHL). They have also been seen in MLS. Almost all MLB teams use rally towels now.

=== Baseball ===
The first rally towel to be used in Major League Baseball (MLB) was the Homer Hanky (a handkerchief printed with the Twins logo) of the Minnesota Twins. It gained popularity throughout the 1987 pennant race as a promotional item created by the Minneapolis Star Tribune. The Twins would later go on to win the 1987 World Series. The Homer Hanky has been present in every Twins playoff run since, including during the Twins victory in the 1991 World Series.

During the 2010 MLB postseason, five of the eight teams in the playoffs had rally towels. The two teams in the 2010 World Series, the San Francisco Giants and the Texas Rangers, both had rally towels. The Giants had orange "rally rags", but only for Game 2, while the Rangers used red, white, and blue rally towels for Games 3, 4, and 5, all of the home games in Arlington. This was the first World Series that both teams had rally towels since the 2006 World Series.

In 2016, Major League Baseball added a rule (nicknamed the "Homer Hanky Rule") specifying that "in-stadium rally towels" may not be white in color due to potential hitter confusion. As a result, all rally towels and since 2016 have been in alternate colors, including the Twins' own 2019 Homer Hanky, which took the form of a small red terrycloth towel.

In baseball, the teams that use rally towels that are common to hand out besides the Twins are usually the Colorado Rockies, Detroit Tigers, Philadelphia Phillies, and St. Louis Cardinals. The Toronto Blue Jays hand out rally towels as part of their "Fan Fridays" promotion, inaugurated in 2010. Along with the Giants and Rangers, the Cincinnati Reds also started in 2010.

Teams that use rally towels

- Arizona Diamondbacks (starting 2017 season)
- Baltimore Orioles
- Chicago Cubs
- Chicago White Sox
- Cincinnati Reds
- Cleveland Guardians
- Colorado Rockies
- Detroit Tigers
- Houston Astros (starting 2015 season)
- Kansas City Royals
- Los Angeles Dodgers
- Miami Marlins
- Milwaukee Brewers
- Minnesota Twins
- New York Mets
- Oakland Athletics
- Philadelphia Phillies
- Pittsburgh Pirates
- San Diego Padres
- San Francisco Giants
- Seattle Mariners
- St. Louis Cardinals
- Tampa Bay Rays
- Texas Rangers
- Toronto Blue Jays
- Washington Nationals

Teams that do not use rally towels

- Atlanta Braves
- Boston Red Sox
- Los Angeles Angels
- New York Yankees

=== Basketball ===
Few NBA teams have rally towels. The most significant teams with towels are the Cleveland Cavaliers and the Memphis Grizzlies. Fans used them in the playoffs, including when LeBron James returned to Quicken Loans Arena as a member of the Miami Heat. The Grizzlies have handed out their Growl Towel for every playoff game in team history, going back to their first series in 2003–04. It has not been uncommon to spot Grizzlies fans with their Growl Towel at home and away games. For the Heat, rally towels are given during their playoff runs with the phrase "White Hot". Other teams include the Oklahoma City Thunder and the Boston Celtics. The 2011 NBA Champions Dallas Mavericks gave out towels during their first-round series against the Blazers, and in their Western Conference Finals series against the Thunder during their championship run in 2011. The Pacers and 76ers also came into use in 2011.

=== Football ===
In the National Football League (American football), the Seattle Seahawks use rally towels as part of their 12th-man saga. In 2010, 12th-man rally towels were given out. The Chicago Bears, Dallas Cowboys, Denver Broncos, Indianapolis Colts, Minnesota Vikings, New England Patriots, New York Giants, and Philadelphia Eagles also hand out rally towels in the playoffs. the Pittsburgh Steelers also have their own rally towel, dubbed the "Terrible Towel".

=== Hockey ===
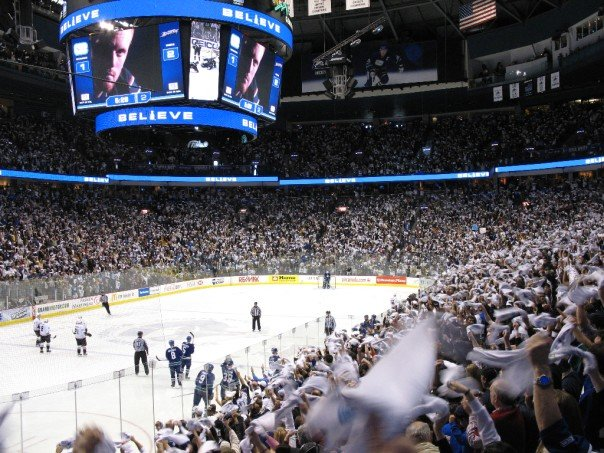
Towel Power in Vancouver during the Canucks' 2007 NHL Playoffs

The NHL has many teams that use rally towels, especially during the Stanley Cup Playoffs. The Winnipeg Jets use white towels during the playoffs for their "Winnipeg Whiteout" tradition. The Arizona Coyotes, who were the original Winnipeg Jets, have also used white towels for their own "Whiteout." The Penguins have also used white towels until they switched to gold towels for the "Gold-Out" for the 2016 Stanley Cup Playoffs. The Stars use them in the playoffs, especially when they won the Stanley Cup in 1999. As the Mighty Ducks, the Ducks referred to their towels as "Fowl Towels". The Ducks' towels are currently orange. The Blackhawks, Blue Jackets, Bruins, Canadiens, Capitals, Devils, Golden Knights, Hurricanes, Islanders, Kings, Kraken, Predators, Rangers, Red Wings, Senators, Mammoth, and Sharks also have rally towels. The first team that used rally towels in hockey was in 1982 by the Vancouver Canucks. Canucks fans use the term Towel Power to describe the waving of rally towels by their fans.

=== Other ===
In other sports, rally towels are rarely used. In Major League Soccer (MLS), rally towels are less common due to the popularity of scarves.

College teams also occasionally use rally towels. Texas A&M began using "12th Man" Towels in 1985 with the 12th Man kickoff team to help boost student support at Kyle Field. TCU gave rally towels to fans of the Horned Frogs in Pasadena when they were selected by the Bowl Championship Series to the 2011 Rose Bowl against Wisconsin. TCU beat Wisconsin on January 1, 2011. South Carolina and LSU are also known to give fans rally towels. The Michigan Wolverines also give towels to students for rivalry games.

== See also ==
- Rally cap
- Towel Power
- Green Weenie
- Homer Hanky
- Foam hand
- Tarps Off
