= Allegheny Valley School =

Non-profit organization in Pennsylvania, U.S.

- Founded: 1960
- Purpose: Provide care for those with disabilities
- Location: 1996 Ewings Mill Road, Coraopolis, Pennsylvania
- Coordinates: 40°29′10.6″N 80°08′44.4″W
- Region served: Pennsylvania
- Owner: Independent (1960-2008); NHS Human Services (2008-present)

Fundraising activities for the Allegheny Valley School

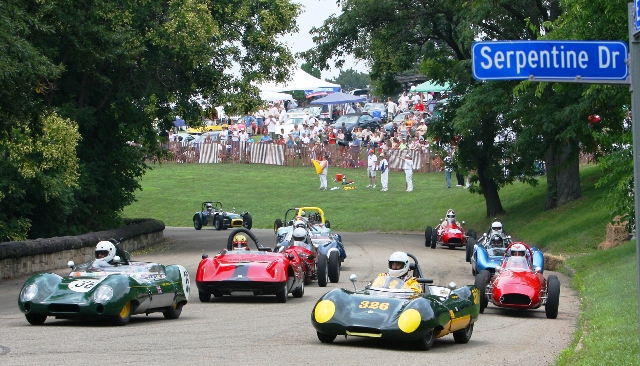
A view of the 2008 Pittsburgh Vintage Grand Prix

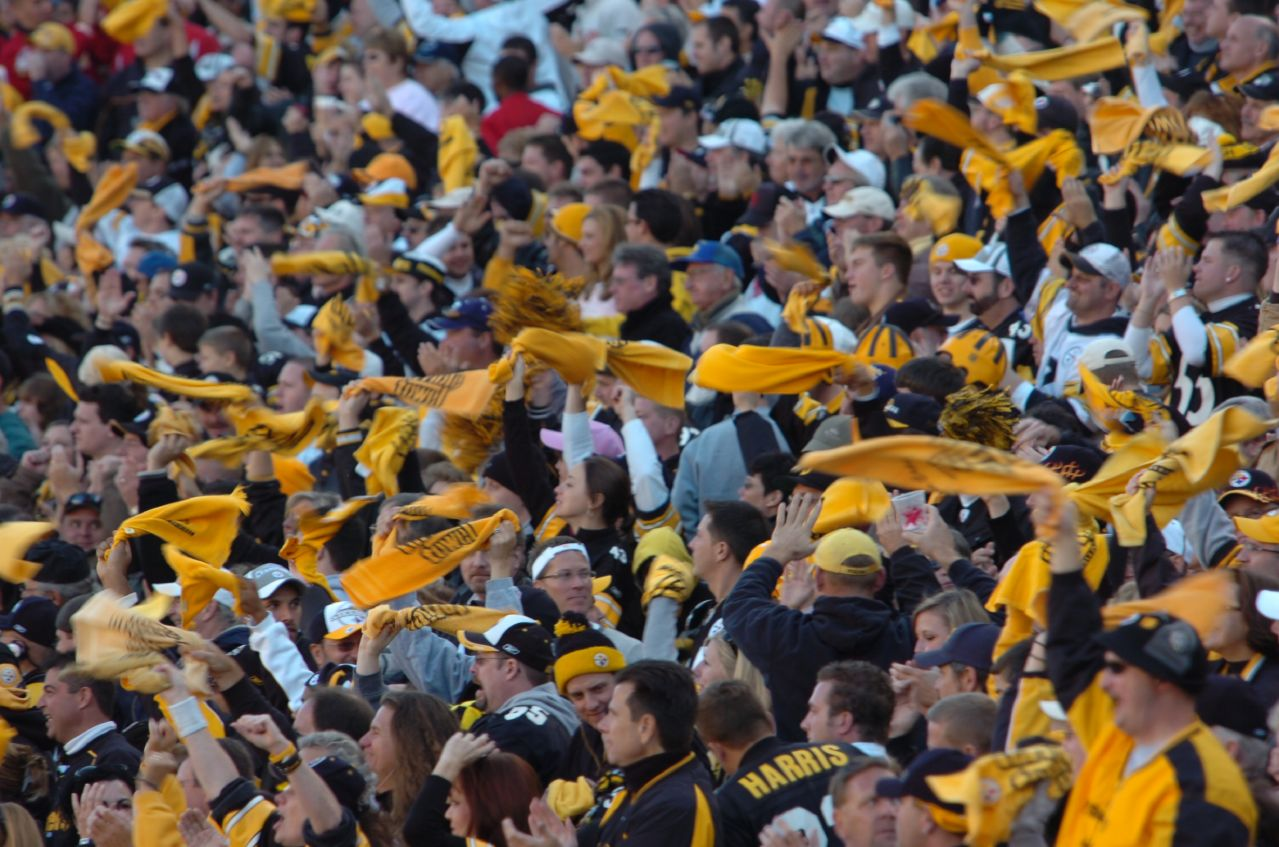
Steelers fans waving The Terrible Towel at Heinz Field on October 15, 2006

Allegheny Valley School is a private non-profit organization based in the Pittsburgh region that provides services to individuals with disabilities. The school operates more than 125 programs across Pennsylvania, with locations in Allegheny, Beaver, Bucks, Butler, Dauphin, Lebanon, Mercer, Montgomery, and Philadelphia Counties. Of the 125 programs statewide, 67 are based in Western Pennsylvania, 17 in Central Pennsylvania and 44 in Eastern Pennsylvania. The headquarters are in Coraopolis, Pennsylvania.

It was established in 1960 to care for children with intellectual and developmental disabilities; when the Pittsburgh Home for Babies, an orphanage, closed, the Allegheny Valley School accepted the 10 children with intellectual disabilities who had been there.

In 1983, Pittsburgh sportscaster Myron Cope founded the Pittsburgh Vintage Grand Prix to raise funds for the Allegheny Valley School and The Autism Society of Pittsburgh. Cope said "My son, who was born brain-damaged and can neither speak nor otherwise function normally, has lived at Allegheny Valley School since 1982. For my late wife Mildred and me, Allegheny Valley School was a Godsend. My son is happy and is cared for with expertise, understanding and love." In 1996, Cope gave the rights to the Terrible Towel to the Allegheny Valley School, the proceeds from which continue to fund the school.

In 2000, the Western Center, a state-run facility for disabled persons, closed and some residents were moved to the Allegheny Valley School.

In 2008, Allegheny Valley School was acquired by NHS Human Services.

As of 2013, it was serving more than 900 children, adults and senior citizens; residents have a variety of physical disabilities, medical complications, behavioral management needs.
