= Trask Coliseum =

Multi-purpose arena in Wilmington, North Carolina

- "Coliseum Of Chaos"
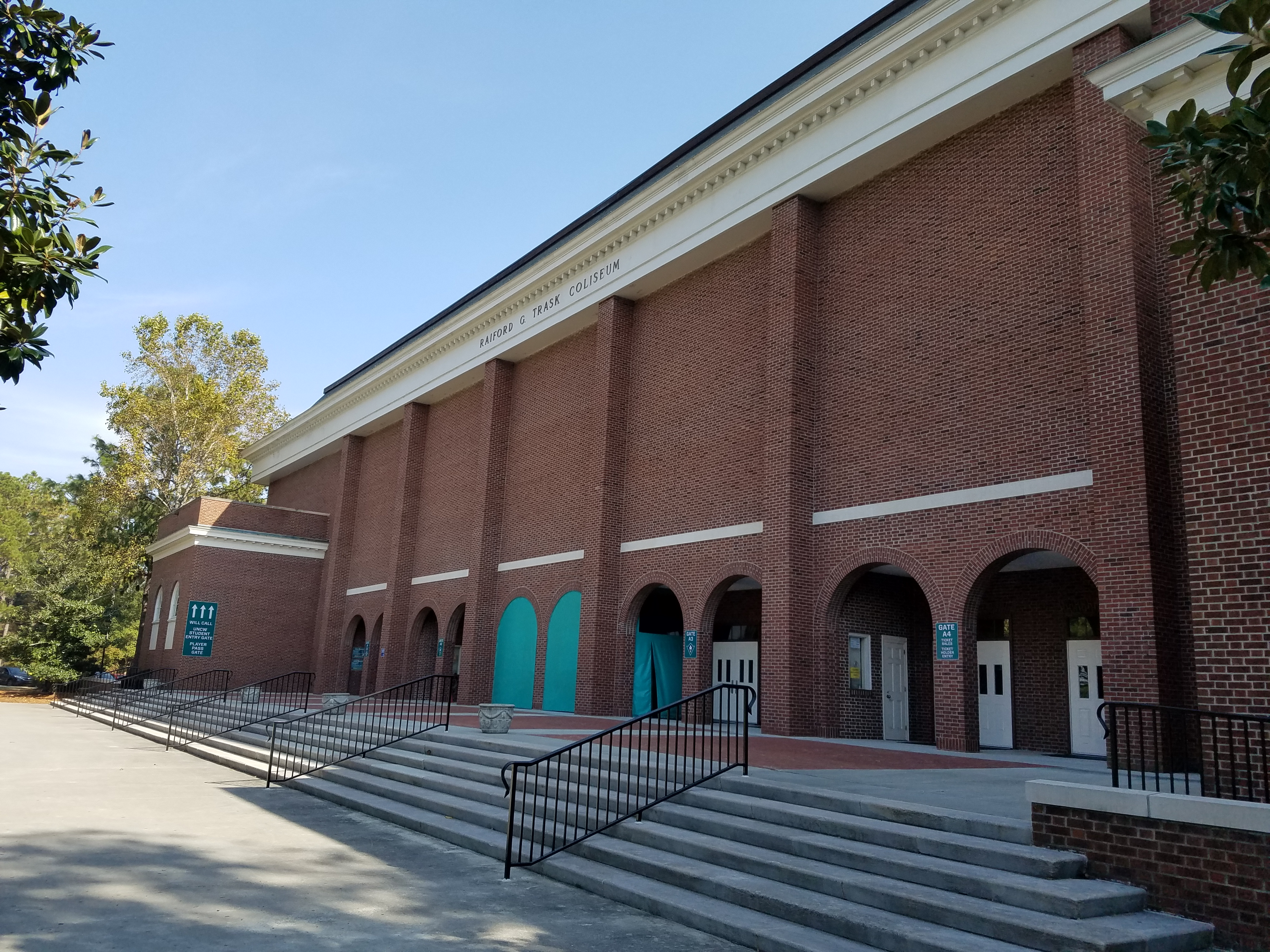
- Interactive map of Trask Coliseum
- Location: 601 S College Rd, Wilmington, NC 28403
- Coordinates: 34.225°N 77.878333°W
- Capacity: 5,200

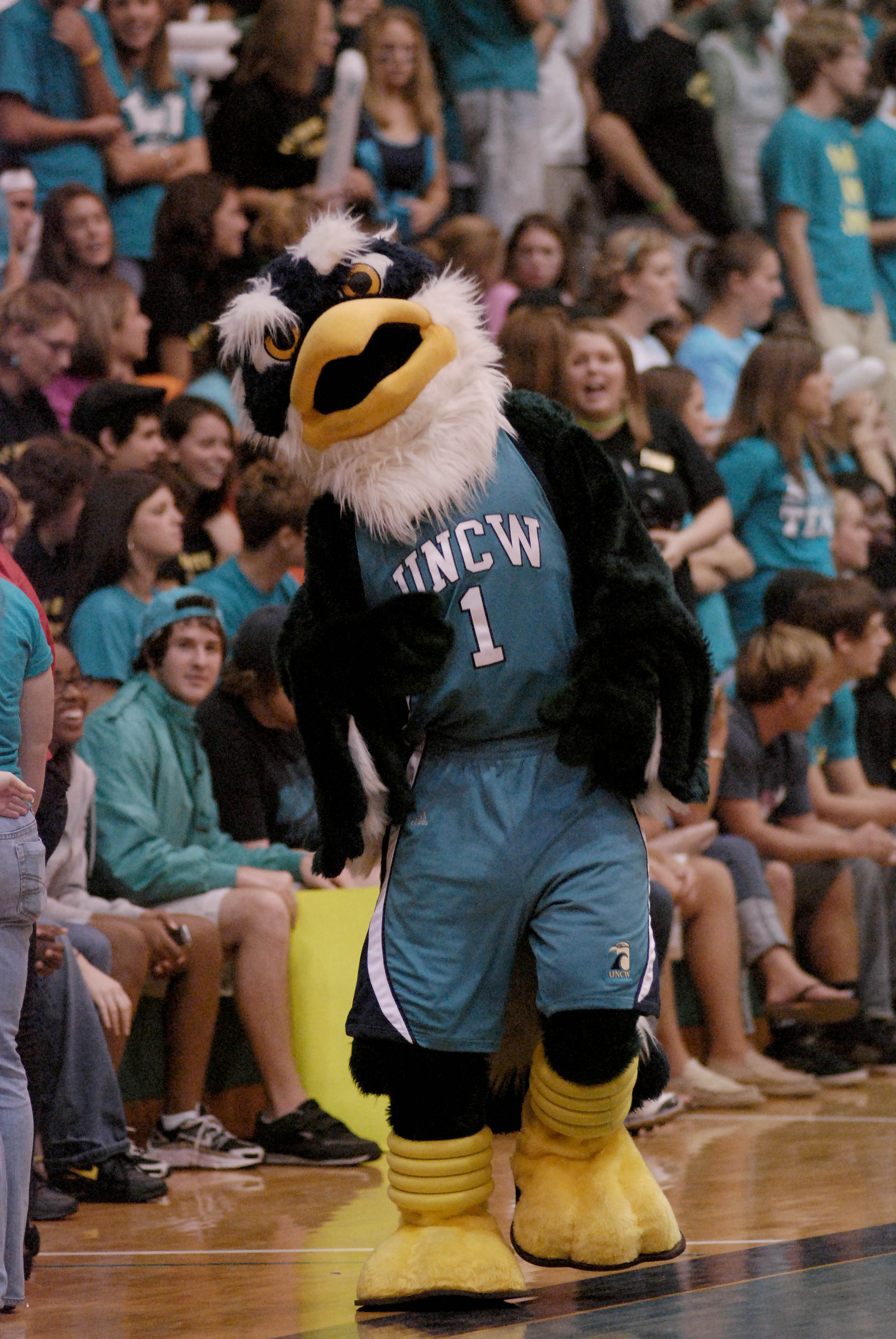
UNCW mascot Sammy C. Hawk celebrates 2008 Midnight Madness.

Trask Coliseum is a 5,200-seat multi-purpose arena in Wilmington, North Carolina.

== History ==
The coliseum was opened in 1977 and named after Raiford Graham Trask, a trustee of Wilmington College.

It is home to the University of North Carolina at Wilmington Seahawks basketball team, as well as some graduations for New Hanover County high schools.

== Performances ==
The hard rock group Cinderella performed at the arena on September 1, 1989.

== See also ==
- List of NCAA Division I basketball arenas
