= Midnight Madness (basketball) =

Annual American college basketball event

Midnight Madness (and variations)
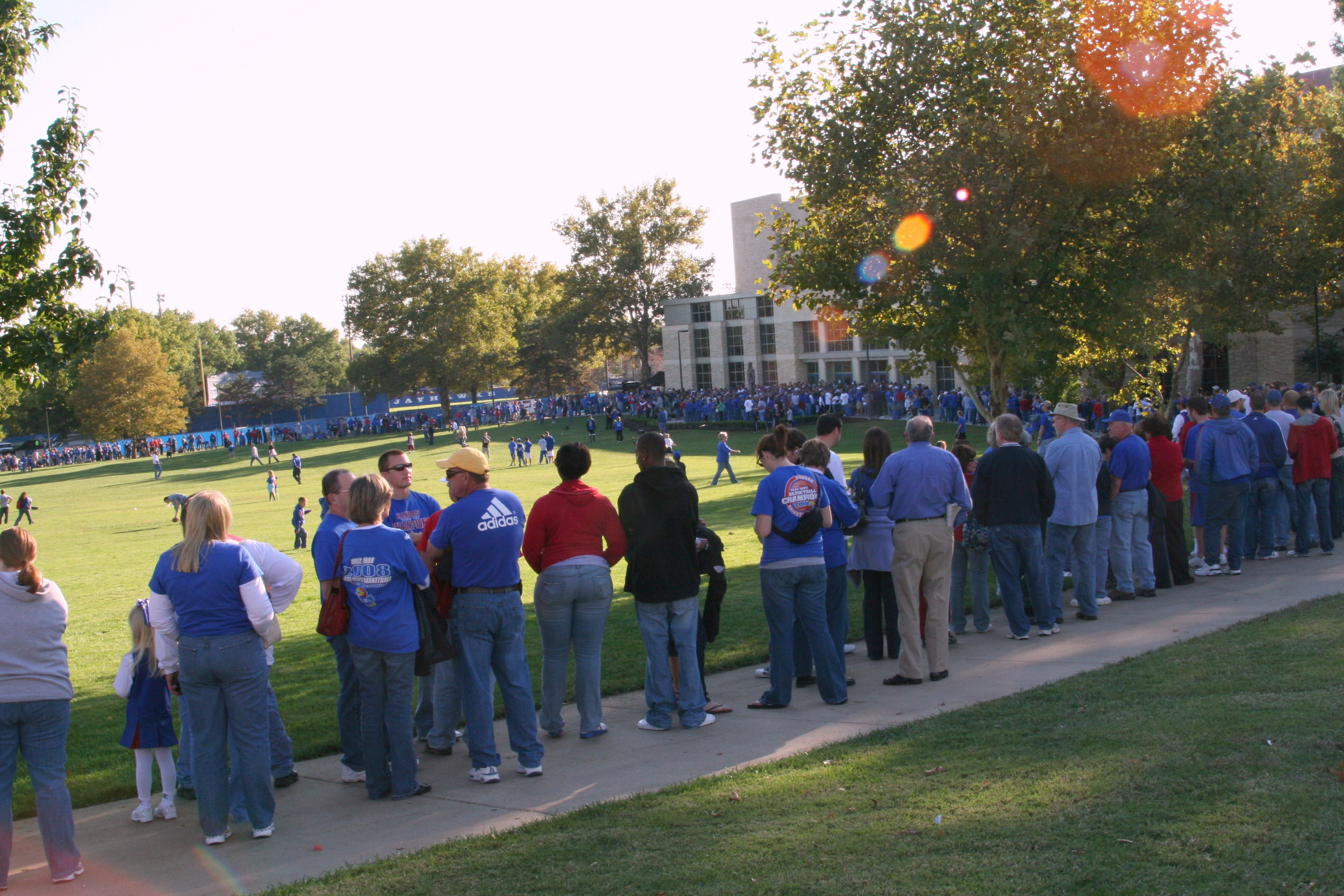
- Kansas Jayhawks men's basketball fans wait to attend Late Night in the Phog.
- Genre: Athletic exhibition and celebration
- Dates: Friday near October 15
- Location: Individual schools
- Years active: 1970 to 71–present

Midnight Madness is an annual event celebrating the upcoming college basketball season in which a team opens its first official practice to the public, often combining it with a pep rally and other fan-friendly activities. The tradition originated from teams holding public practices at midnight on the earliest day that the National Collegiate Athletic Association (NCAA) would allow a practice to be held. In 2013, a new NCAA rule established some flexibility around the opening of a team's practice sessions. As a result, the dates on which teams celebrate Midnight Madness can vary, but most stick with the traditional date of a Friday night closest to October 15.

== History ==
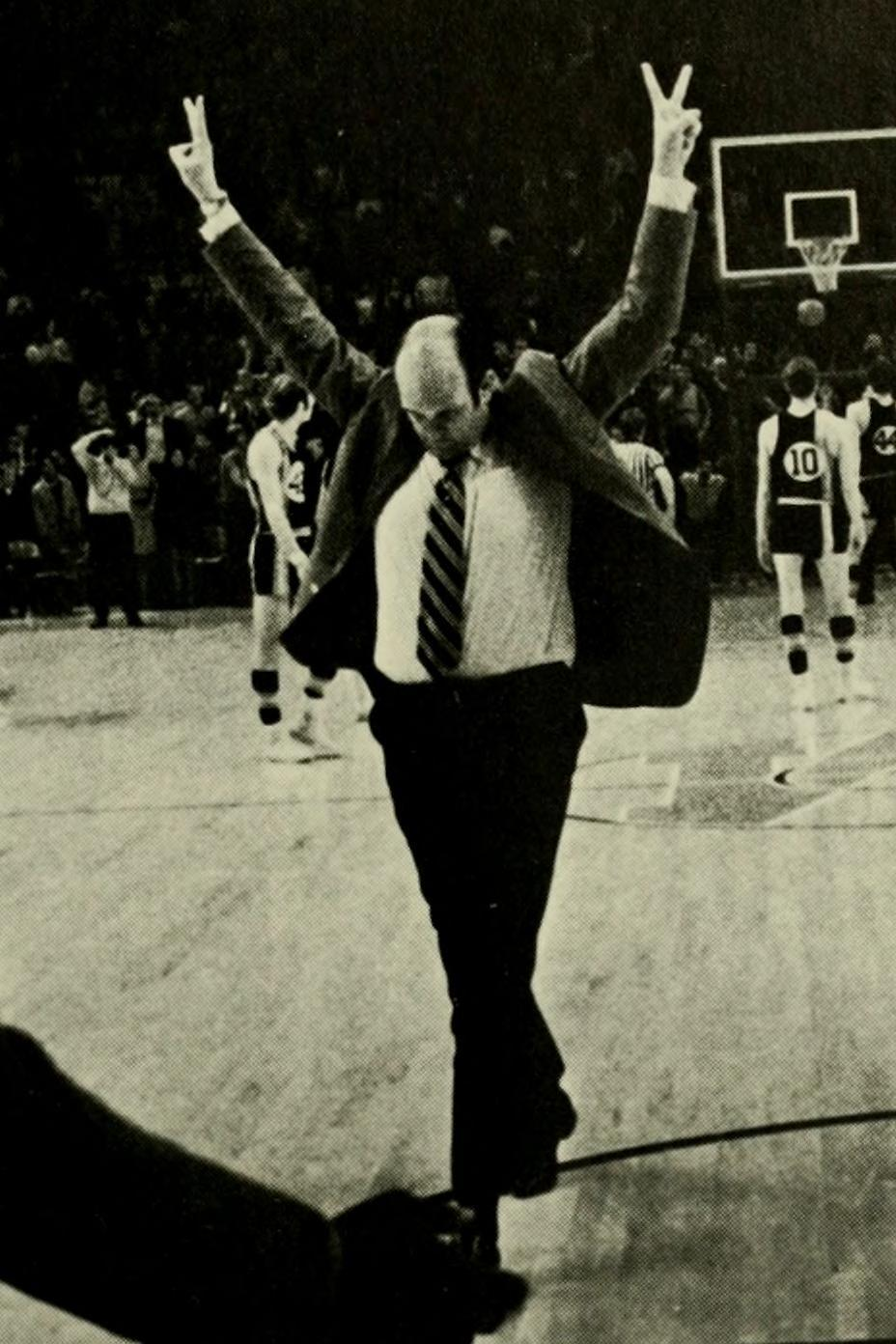
Maryland coach Lefty Driesell held the first "Midnight Madness" session in 1971.

Prior to the 2013–14 NCAA Division I men's basketball season men's and women's basketball teams were not permitted to practice prior to the Friday closest to October 15. Maryland Terrapins head coach Lefty Driesell began the Midnight Madness tradition at 12:03 a.m. on October 15, 1971, by inviting the public to a 1.5 mile team run. The early practice session was attended by 3,000 fans at the track surrounding Byrd Stadium on the University of Maryland campus. Driesell continued the annual midnight practice session throughout his tenure at Maryland, and brought the tradition with him when he became head coach at Georgia State University. In 2008, that school delayed the event until sunrise for the first time since Driesell established the tradition.

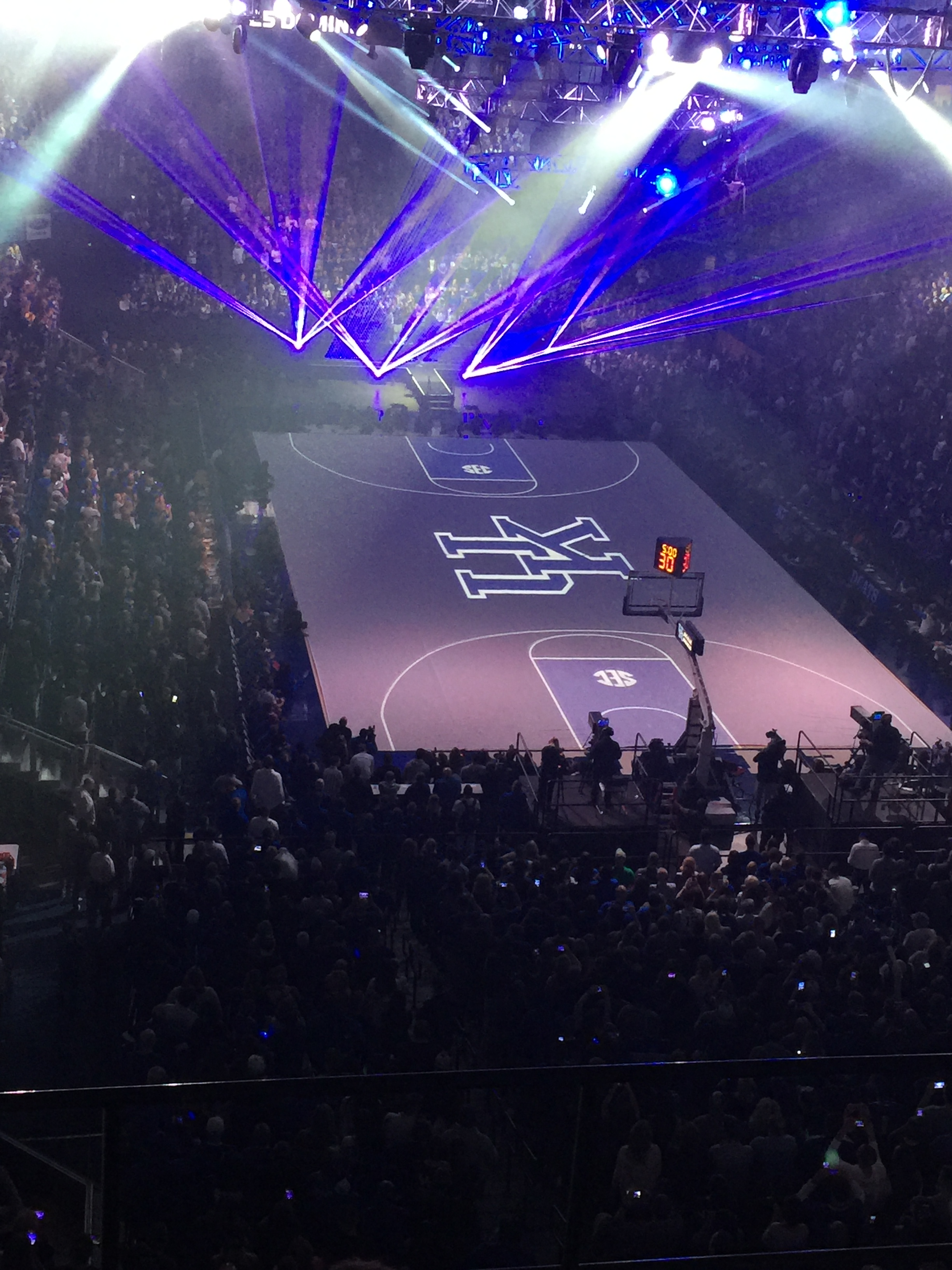
Big Blue Madness in 2015, at Rupp Arena in Lexington, Kentucky.

In 1982, coach Joe B. Hall and the Kentucky Wildcats men's basketball team began to officially promote a celebration dubbed "Midnight Madness" as a school event with formal entertainment acts and an invited student audience. This event was held in Memorial Coliseum and held 8,500 people in the then-12,500 seat gym. Big Blue Madness is now televised and hosts celebrities including Drake, who performed in 2014. Another of the more famous events is "Late Night in the Phog" at Kansas, which was started in 1985 by Larry Brown and is now broadcast in live streaming video via the Internet. The event has caught on on most campuses; various programs have given away T-shirts and allowed players do stunt dunks and half court shots. Some schools schedule intrasquad scrimmages, three-point shooting contests and/or slam dunk contests. The event is often a co-ed event, in which both the men's and women's teams participate in the celebration, especially at schools like the University of Connecticut, where the men's and women's teams have a combined 15 championships. Scout.com estimated that in 2007, approximately 160 of the top blue chip high school basketball recruits in the country were attending a Midnight Madness event during the weekend that opens the basketball season.

In 2013, the NCAA ruled that men's practices could begin two weeks earlier than the traditional date, so long as teams held no more than 30 days of practice in the six weeks prior to the first regular-season game. This change was made to provide more flexible scheduling that accommodated off days in the preseason practice schedule. However, the women's programs rejected moving the date forward so as not to conflict with recruiting. As a result of practices beginning so early, several teams opted to celebrate Midnight Madness later in the six-week practice window.

== Details ==
2008 Michigan State Spartans basketball Midnight Madness
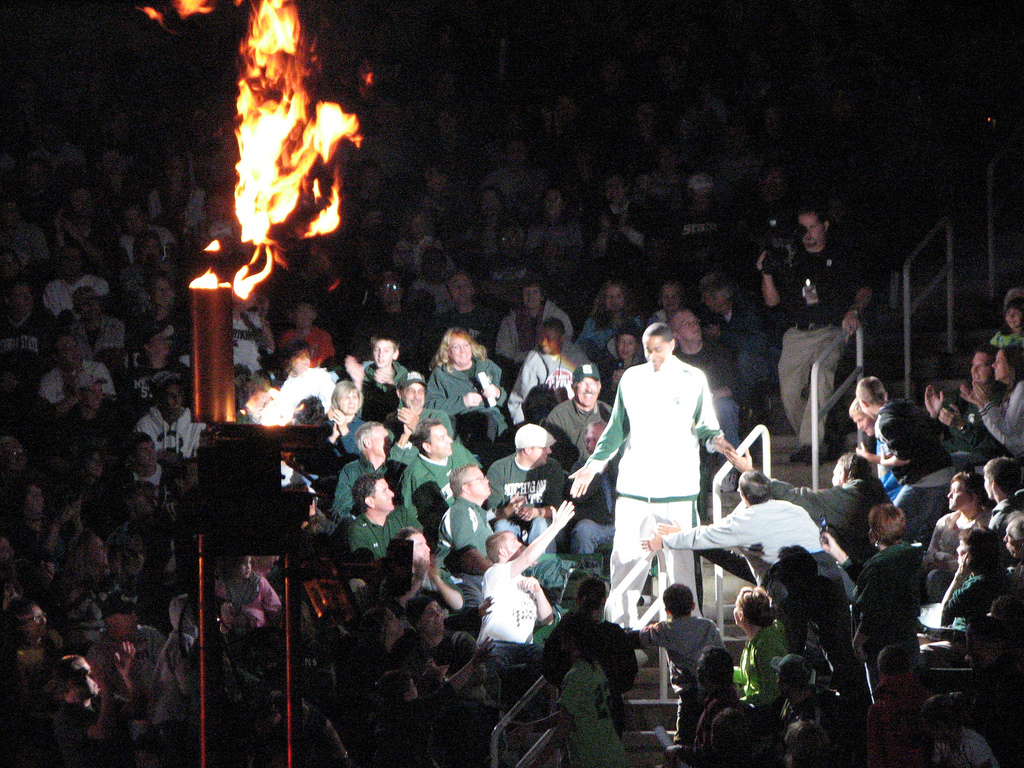
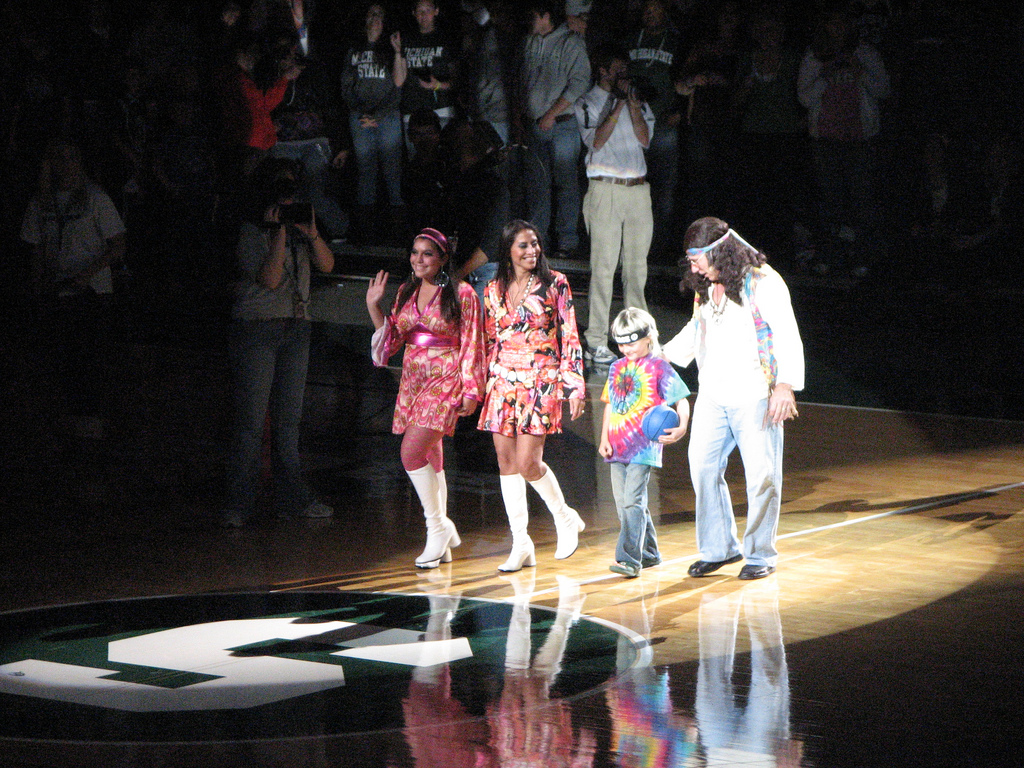
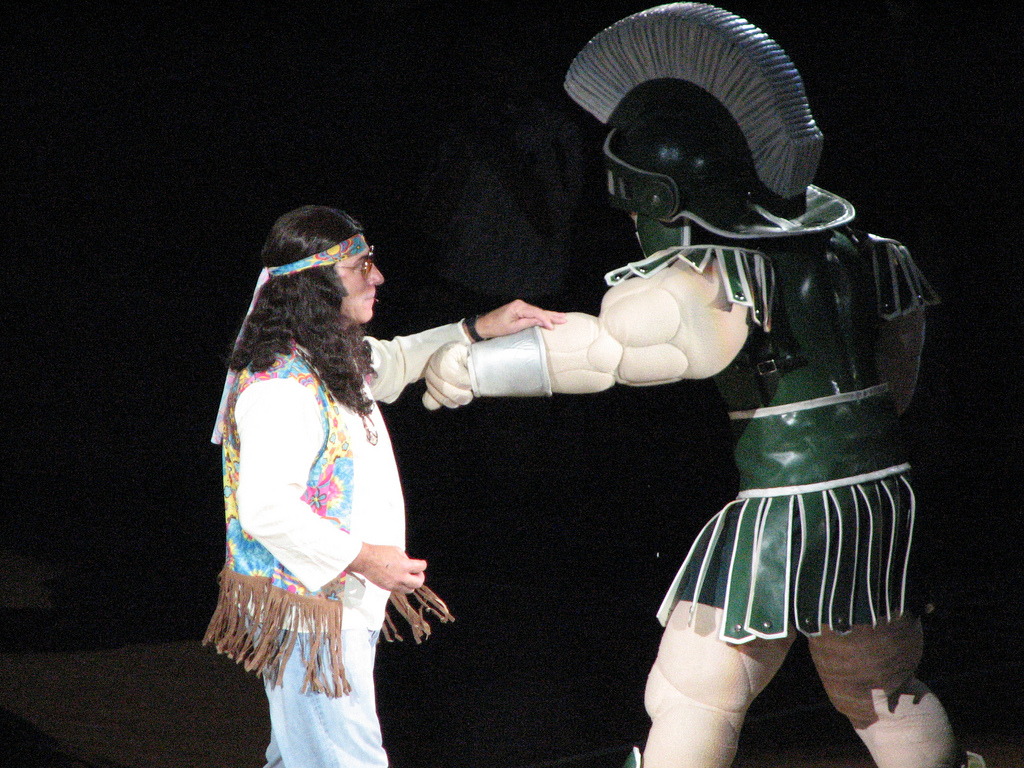
Left: Player introductions; Center: Tom Izzo and family in costume; Right: Izzo and the Michigan State Spartans' mascot

In the 21st century, most basketball programs from large Division I schools have planned a pep rally with MCs, music, dancing and other festivities to encourage support of the program. Celebrity guests and alumni participate in entertaining the students. Often, there is significant publicity surrounding the event, which may include televised broadcasts, published press releases and various new media exposure.

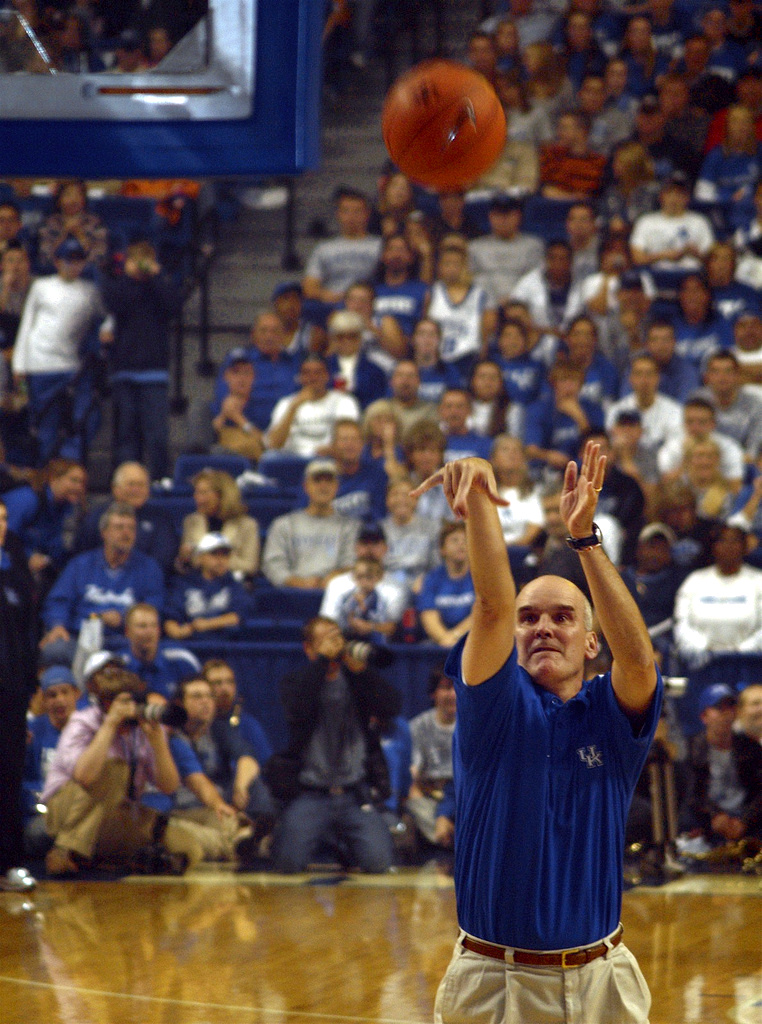
Kyle Macy was among the celebrity participants at the 2006 Kentucky Wildcats men's basketball opening night celebration

Some of the more outlandish occurrences during such events included coach participation, such as Michigan State Spartans men's basketball coach Tom Izzo riding a Harley-Davidson motorcycle onto the court and Florida Gators men's basketball coach Billy Donovan rising out of a coffin. Although signing week, when top recruits sign letters of intent that commit them to specific schools, does not occur until November, blue chip high school recruits are sometimes welcomed at these events even in their junior years. Usually a prescribed number of fans (such as the first 1,000) receive a gifts such as t-shirts, posters, autographs, road game vacation packages, and other free paraphernalia. At many such events, a student is chosen for a half-court shot giveaway. Sometimes the events are televised live by sports networks such as the Big Ten Network, and other times highlights are shown on highlight shows such as ESPN's SportsCenter. ESPNU has begun extensive yearly coverage of midnight madness events and in 2008 televised events at Davidson College, the University of Kansas, Georgetown University, Gonzaga University and Indiana University. Although Midnight Madness has become a prime time event for many premier basketball programs, some schools have continued the tradition of having their first practice at 12:00 on the first day regular practice is allowed.

2008 Kansas Jayhawks Late Night in the Phog at the "Phog" Allen Fieldhouse
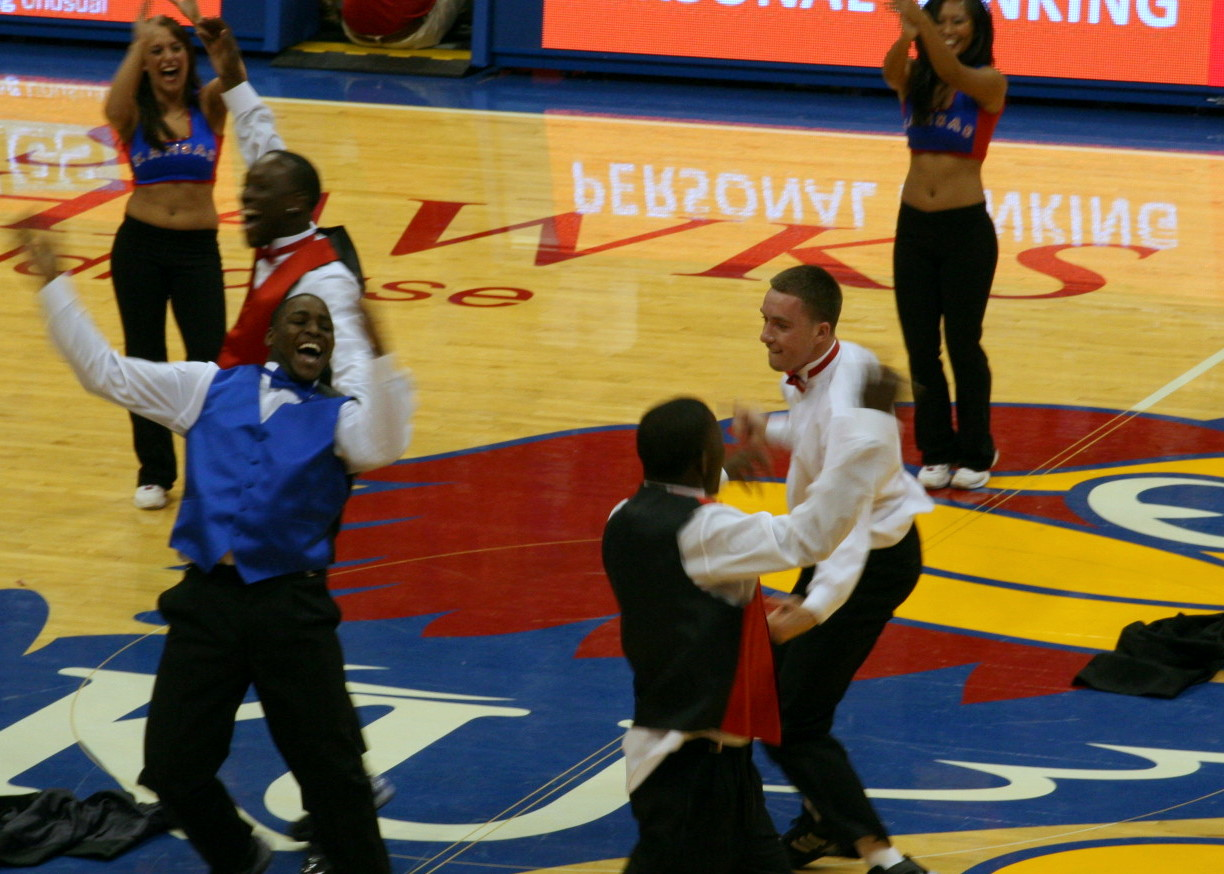
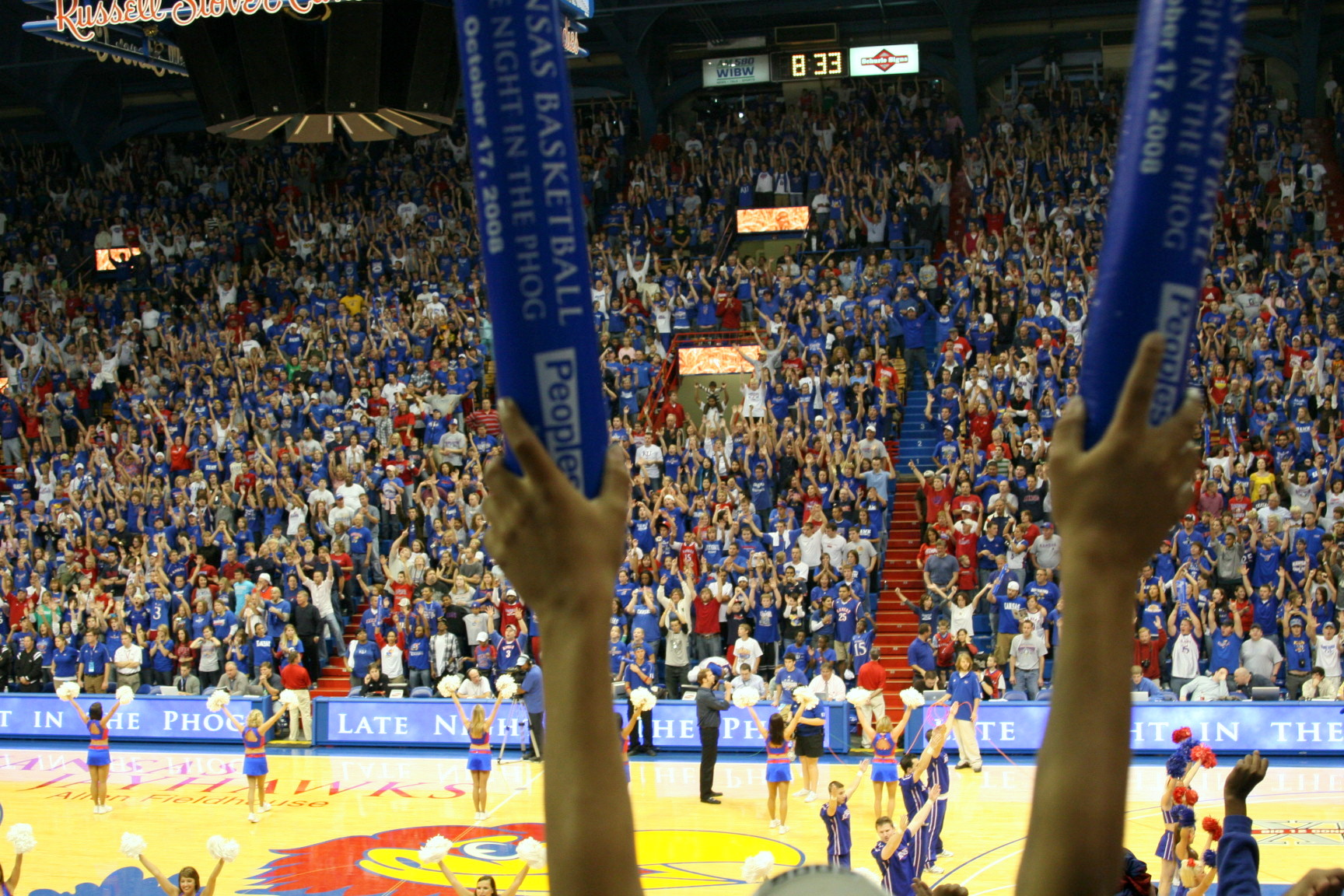
Left: Players celebrate with a dance routine.; Right: fans celebrate with thundersticks.

As of 2006, the University of Kentucky held the record for attendance at this type of sports rally with an attendance of 23,312 at Rupp Arena. Kentucky has sold out Rupp Arena multiple times for what they call "Big Blue Madness" and in the 2008–09 Kentucky Wildcats men's basketball season fans had to camp out in lines for days in advance to obtain tickets.

One celebratory function of the evening is often to raise NCAA Division I men's basketball tournament or Final Four banners to the rafters in an official ceremony. In 2008, both 2008 NCAA Men's Division I Basketball Tournament finalists, the Kansas Jayhawks men's basketball and Memphis Tigers men's basketball teams, did so during their respective Midnight Madness event. The October 16, 2009 celebrations occurred on many campuses and a sampling were aired on the ESPN family of networks. Five Big Ten Conference schools celebrated Midnight Madness.

== Exceptions ==
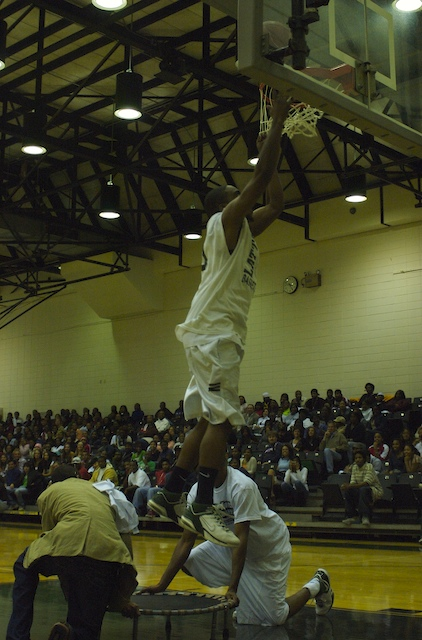
A mini-trampoline-aided dunk was part of the 2006 University of South Carolina Upstate festivities.

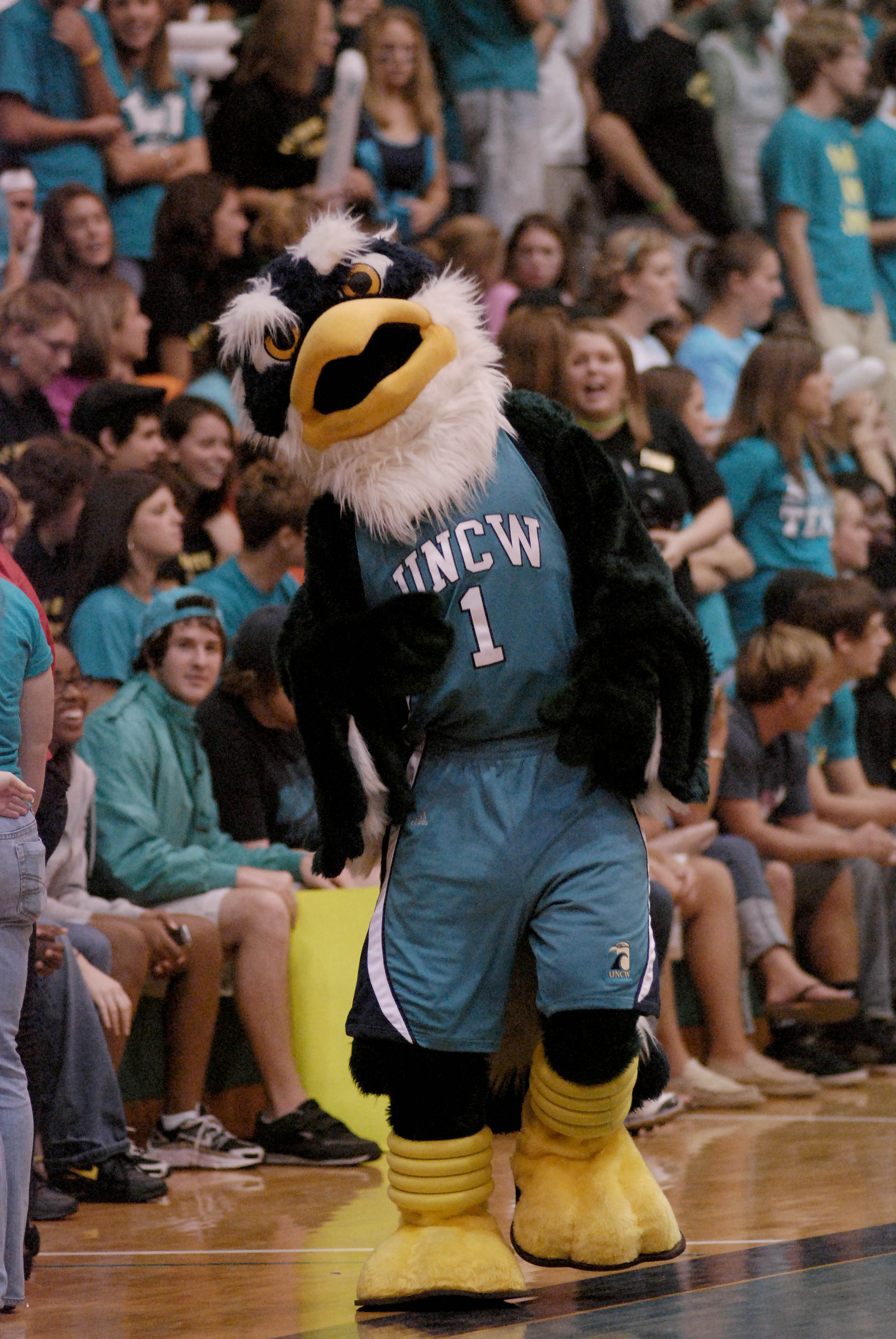
University of North Carolina at Wilmington mascot Sammy C. Hawk celebrates in 2008 at Trask Coliseum

In 2008, some teams attempted to host Midnight Madness in association with special early restricted practices instead of the first day of regular practices. These universities felt that since their football teams had home games the week before the opening date of formal practices, which had become the traditional Midnight Madness date, they would be better off holding Midnight Madness on the weekend before. In 2008, teams were allowed to practice two hours per week between September 15 and October 17 under what is known as the "Offseason Workout Rule," and at least four notable public "practice" sessions (by Illinois, Kentucky, Marshall and West Virginia) were held during these weekly practices before daily practices were permitted. At the University of Illinois, the Illinois Fighting Illini men's basketball and women's basketball teams hosted scrimmages at Memorial Stadium after an October 11 game between the Illinois Fighting Illini football team and the Minnesota Golden Gophers football team. Since the attendance for the football game was 62,870, this event was described as the "World's Largest Basketball Practice". Charlie Zegers reports that the practice session events occurred both at halftime and after the game.

Kentucky was one of the schools that held their public practice event a week early in part because they could lure more recruiting prospects during a week when most other programs were not hosting similar events. The National Association of Basketball Coaches asked the Southeastern Conference to force Kentucky to adhere to the traditionally scheduled practice to no avail. They then belatedly petitioned the NCAA to legislate conformity unsuccessfully. Kentucky coach Billy Gillispie had contacted the Kentucky's compliance office, the SEC and the NCAA to ensure that no rules were being violated.

2006 Florida Gator Midnight Madness celebration
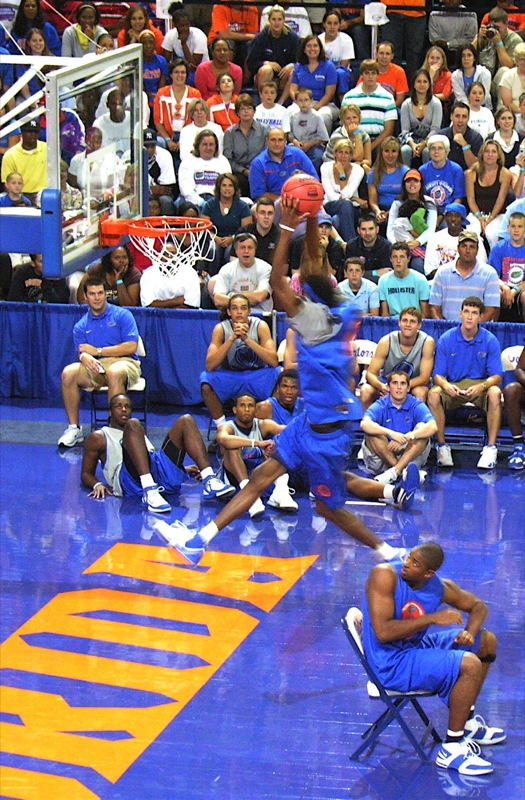
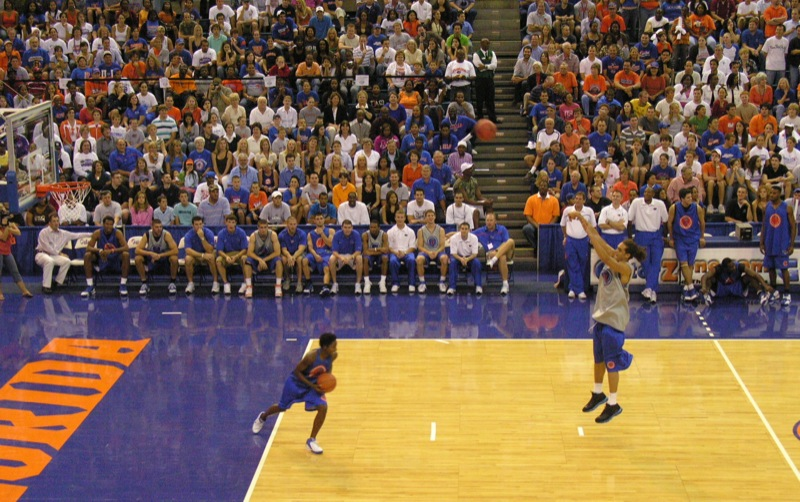
Left: Corey Brewer dunk exhibition; Right: Sha Brooks and Joakim Noah co-ed 3-point shootout

Illinois head coach Bruce Weber had also received permission for the early practice festivities from the NCAA. He had proposed having a September 13 session in association with a home football game against Louisiana–Lafayette. The date with the Ragin' Cajuns would have in all likelihood been a more favorable day in terms of the climate, but this date preceded even the Offseason Workout Rule dates. It is anticipated that in the future, public basketball practices linked to the Offseason Workout Rule will be banned. Illinois claimed that their date change was not intended to give it a recruiting advantage in terms of scheduling conflicts.
