= Green Weenie =

Pittsburgh sports object and ritual

The Green Weenie was a sports gimmick in Pittsburgh, Pennsylvania, co-created by Bob Prince (1916–1985), the broadcaster for the Pittsburgh Pirates Major League Baseball team, and team trainer Danny Whelan in the 1966 season. It was manufactured by Tri-State Plastics, a Pittsburgh plastic thermoforming company between 1967 and 1974 and during the 1989 season.

The Green Weenie was a green plastic rattle in the shape of a hot dog, which, when waved at opposing players, purportedly put a jinx on them. Conversely, when waved at Pirate players it allegedly bestowed good luck. In September, the H.J. Heinz Co. offered a three-foot (0.9 m) inflatable version for one dollar.

The superstition began during a 1966 game against the Houston Astros, when Whelan shouted from the dugout at Astros' pitcher Dave Giusti, "You're gonna walk him!" while waving a green rubber hot dog in the direction of the pitcher's mound. Giusti did walk the batter, and the Pirates won the game. During the next game's broadcast, Prince quizzed Whelan about the frankfurter incident, and the idea was born. Within weeks, Green Weenies were being sold to fans at Forbes Field.

According to the August 12, 1966 issue of Time magazine, however, the hex of the Green Weenie sometimes seemed to work: "When the Pirates played the Giants two weeks ago, Prince pointed a Weenie at Juan Marichal. Marichal won the game, 2–1, but next day he caught the third finger of his pitching hand in a car door and missed his next scheduled turn on the mound.

In another game in Pittsburgh, the Pirates were trailing the Philadelphia Phillies 3–1 in the seventh inning when Prince's fellow announcer Don Hoak begged Prince to use the Weenie. 'Not yet,' Prince cautioned. In the eighth inning, with the Pirates still behind by two runs, Prince unleashed the Weenie. The home team promptly rallied for four runs to bail out a 5-3 victory. Said Prince to Hoak, "Remember, never waste the power of the Green Weenie!"

In the end, however, the Green Weenie couldn't conjure up a National League pennant for the locals. Swept by the Giants at home in the final three games of the season, the Pirates finished three games out of first place.

The Green Weenie was revived several times during subsequent seasons, but it failed to approach its previous popularity with fans.

In 1974, Prince invented another talisman, encouraging female fans to spark a Pirates rally by waving their babushkas (folded kerchiefs used as head coverings, especially by East European women, a large immigrant minority in Pittsburgh). "Babushka Power", as it was called, most likely inspired the Terrible Towel, another sports gimmick created a year later by sportscaster Myron Cope for the Pittsburgh Steelers, the city's football team. The Terrible Towel has remained popular with Steeler fans for over thirty years.
