= Terrible Towel =

Symbol of the Pittsburgh Steelers American football team

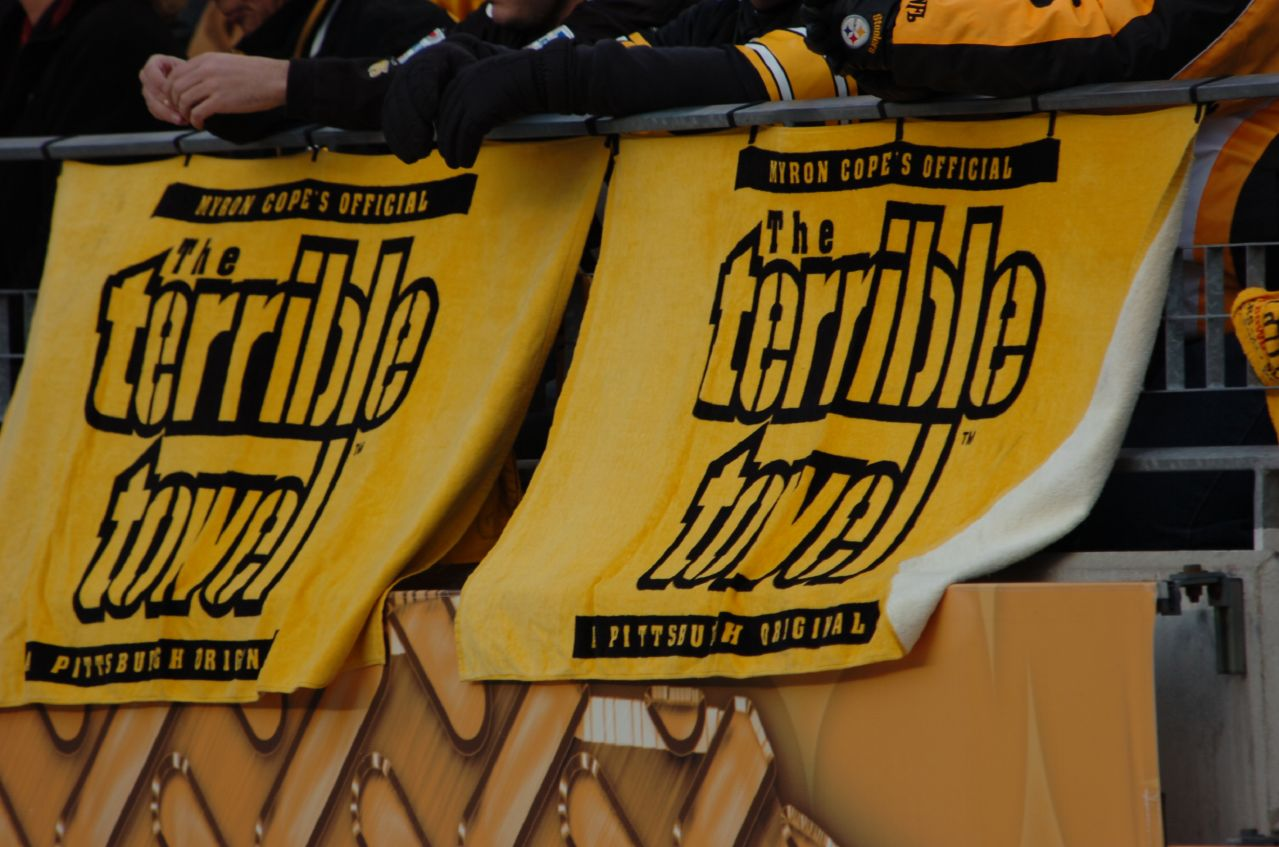
Two Terrible Towels at a Pittsburgh Steelers game

The Terrible Towel is a rally towel associated with the Pittsburgh Steelers, an American football team in the National Football League (NFL). The Terrible Towel has spread in popularity; for example, fans take their Towel to famous sites while on vacation. The Towel has been taken to the peak of Mount Everest, and even into space on the International Space Station. It is widely recognized as a symbol of the Steelers and the city of Pittsburgh.

Proceeds from sales of the Towel have raised over US$8 million for Allegheny Valley School, which cares for people with mental disabilities and physical disabilities. The Terrible Towel is credited with being the first "rally towel" and its success has given rise to similar products promoting other teams.

Numerous versions have been produced; almost all are black and gold in color with the words "Myron Cope's Official The Terrible Towel" printed on the front. In October 2009, a pink Terrible Towel was introduced to promote breast cancer awareness.

== Origin ==
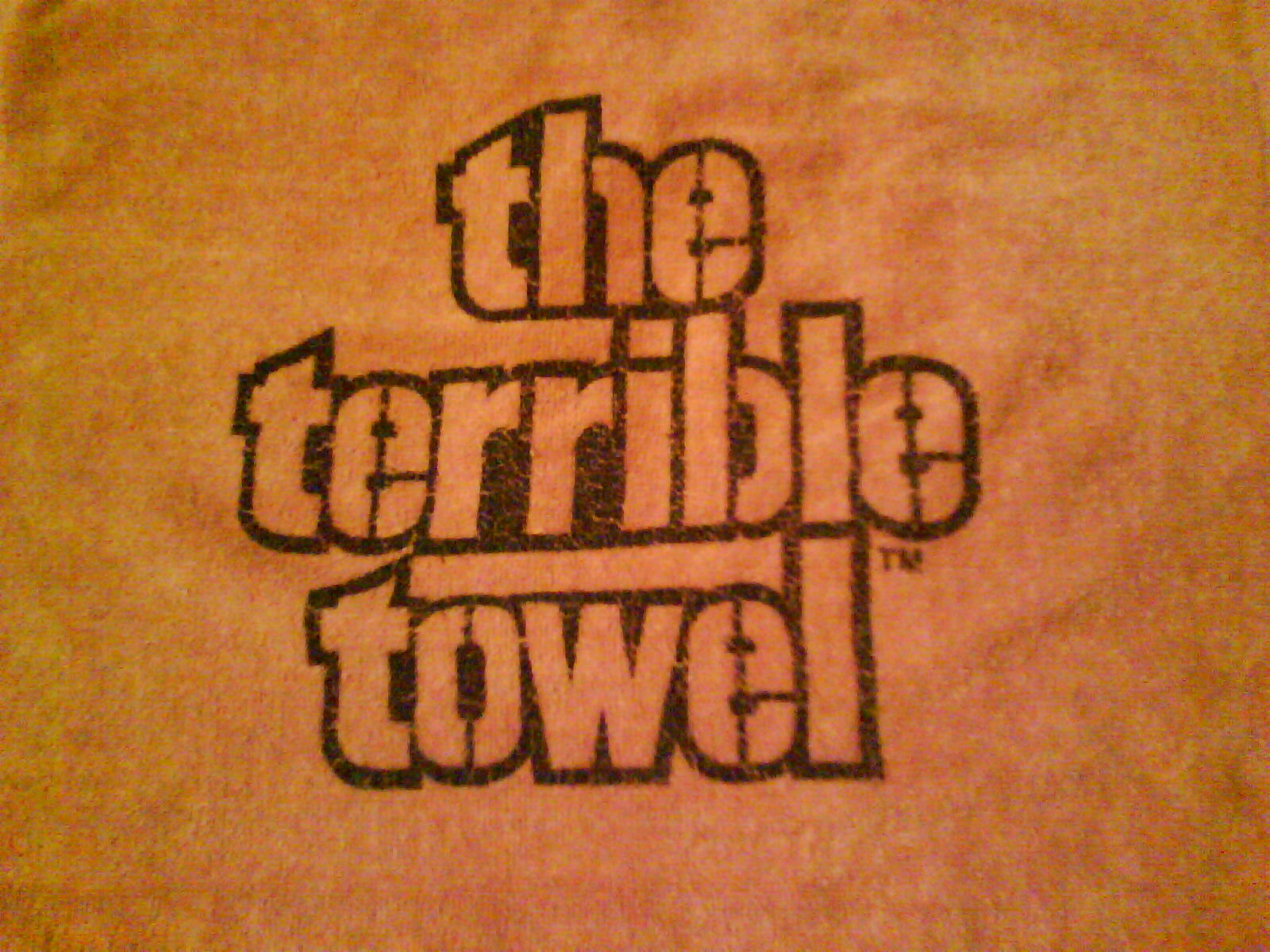
Original commercially marketed Terrible Towel, sold exclusively by Gimbels Department Store, 1976

In 1975, the Steelers won the AFC Central title and qualified for the playoffs. Two weeks prior to the first playoff game, executives of the Steelers' flagship radio station, WTAE, asked radio broadcaster Myron Cope to invent a "gimmick" to attract sponsors for his daily commentaries and talk show. Initially, Cope did not want to participate, saying "I am not a gimmick guy, never have been a gimmick guy." However, after a WTAE executive suggested that a successful gimmick would be good leverage for a raise in Cope's upcoming contract renewal, Cope said, "I'm a gimmick guy."

The three men, along with other radio station advertising personnel, began brainstorming ideas. One idea, a black mask including coach Chuck Noll's motto "Whatever it takes", was deemed too expensive. Cope said the gimmick should be something "lightweight and portable and already owned by just about every fan." Garrett suggested using towels. Cope agreed, suggesting the words "The Terrible Towel" be printed on the front. It was agreed that the towels would be gold or yellow, with the writing in black—the colors of the Steelers. Franklin C. Snyder, who was head of WTAE's radio and television stations, held the final approval of the idea. He approved the idea on the stipulation that black towels would also be allowed, in order to avoid accusations of racism from the FCC; Cope and Garrett agreed.

In the weeks leading up to the game, Cope advertised the idea of the towel to fans on the radio and evening television news, using the phrase "The Terrible Towel is poised to strike!" However, Atkins grew nervous that fans would think the towel was a jinx if the Steelers lost the game. Cope agreed to poll players on their view of the towel. Linebacker Jack Ham told Cope, "I think your idea stinks"; Ernie "Fats" Holmes was also against the idea. Also against the idea of the Towel was Andy Russell, who mirrored Cope's original thoughts, "We're not a gimmick team. We've never been a gimmick team." Cope simply replied, "Russell, you're sick." Growing nervous about the negative feedback, Cope, who had already advertised the towel on the news multiple times, polled the rest of the players with a "banana-republic vote".

I found Terry Bradshaw seated on a stool at his locker, reading the farm reports. "How do you feel about the Terrible Towel?" I asked him.

He looked up and said, "Huh?"

I check him off as a yes ... I reported back to Ted Atkins that the Steelers overwhelmingly approved of the Towel.

— Myron Cope, Double Yoi!

The Towel made its debut on December 27, 1975, in a playoff game against the Baltimore Colts. Prior to the game, Cope, whose idea had been mocked by the local Pittsburgh Post-Gazette, watched the gathering fans through his binoculars from the broadcast booth. He saw fewer than a dozen towels while players were going through pre-game warm-ups. Cope recalls, "Nearing kickoff, the Steelers gathered in their tunnel for introductions, whereupon the crowd exploded—and suddenly, by my estimation, 30,000 Terrible Towels twirled from the fists of fans around the stadium!" The Steelers went on to defeat the Colts 28–10. In the following weeks, the team defeated the Oakland Raiders and Dallas Cowboys, to capture the franchise's second consecutive Super Bowl victory. Even while the Steelers struggled through the 1980s, the Towel remained a large part of the franchise. During the Towel's debut game, Andy Russell returned a fumble 93‒yards for a touchdown. The play inspired local fan Lisa Benz to write about the Towel, which she later sent to Cope. In part, her poem read:

He ran ninety-three
like a bat out of hell,
And no one could see
How he rambled so well.
"It was easy", said Andy
And he flashed a crooked smile,
"I was snapped on the fanny
By the Terrible Towel!"

== Appearance ==
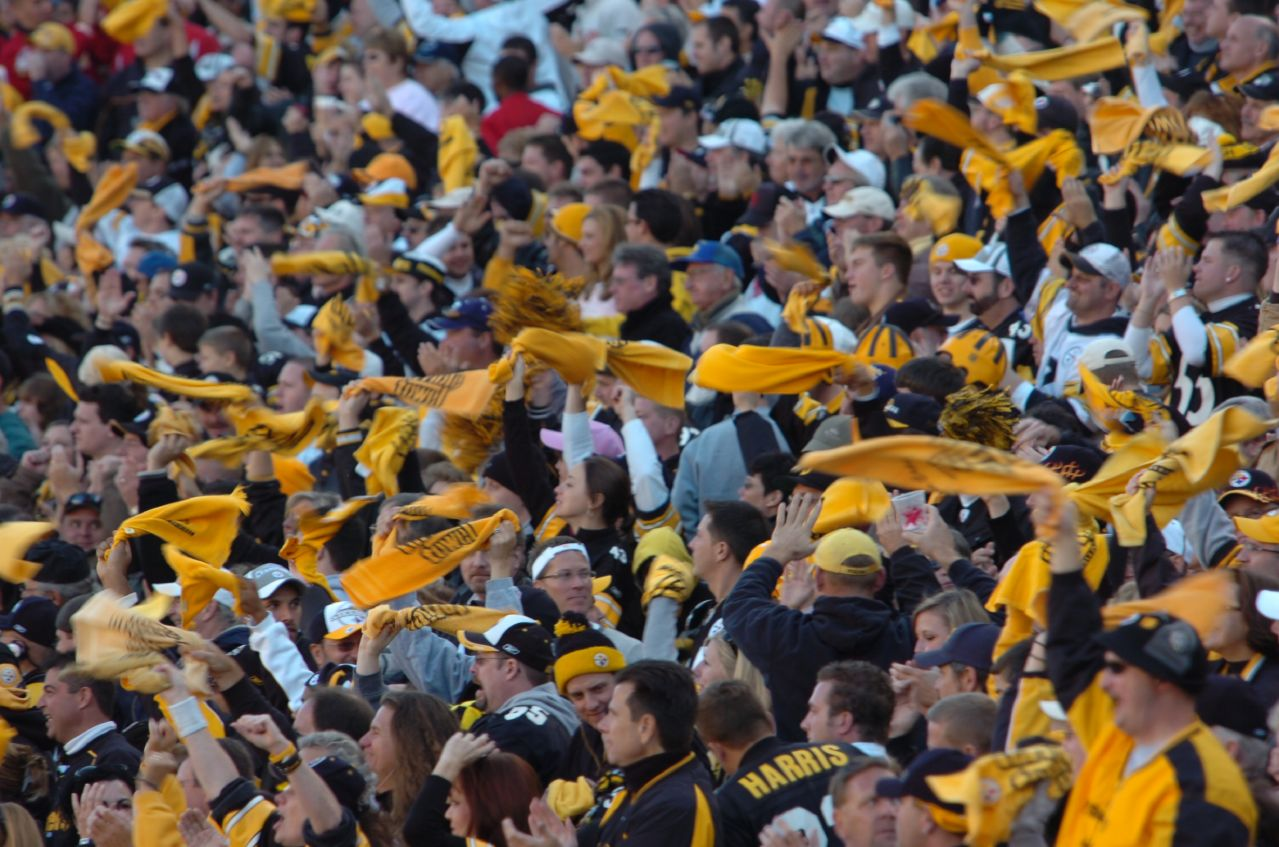
Steelers fans waving the Terrible Towel at Heinz Field — October 15, 2006

The Towel has been redesigned multiple times, as well as spawning its own line of paraphernalia. The line, known as "Terrible Stuff", includes T-shirts, license plates, pillows, earrings, and beach towels; all include The Terrible Towel logo. When originally released, the towel was available in gold and black, was a simple design and had the words "the terrible towel" printed on the front. The current version of the Towel, introduced in 1998, adds the words "Myron Cope's Official" on the top and "A Pittsburgh Original" at the bottom. Towels with a plethora of variations are also in production; such variations include Towels featuring the Steelers logo, embroidered lettering, and towels with reversed colors featuring yellow writing on a black towel. Throughout the years there have also been many special edition Towels. After the Steelers won Super Bowl XL in 2005, a Towel with the words "Super Bowl XL Champions", the date, final score, and Super Bowl XL logo was released. The victory also spawned the production of a Towel featuring the logos of the six Super Bowls that the franchise has won. During the Steelers' 75th anniversary season in 2007, a special edition Towel with the logo of the Steelers' benchmark season was added to the line-up of Towels. The original 1975–1997 Terrible Towel is sold as a throwback on the Steelers official website. A giant Terrible Towel measuring 54' x 90' was introduced at the 2014 home opener at Heinz Field and was "waved" by the 144 fans holding it.

== Rights, marketing and proceeds ==
Upon the sudden popularity of the Terrible Towel, Pittsburgh-area department stores sold out all gold and black hand towels. Because the hand towels were often sold as a set, with matching bath towels, stores were left with un-even sets. In the fall of 1978, Bernard Pollock, divisional marketing manager of Gimbel's Department Store, came up with the idea of putting a Terrible Towel logo on hand towels and sold the idea to Cope. The first Terrible Towels were sold on December 20, 1978, at $6 apiece. The original version of The Terrible Towel was manufactured by Fieldcrest and distributed by St. Mary's Inc. of New York and was available in two colors: gold and black. The current manufacturer of the Towel is Little Earth Productions, Inc. of Pittsburgh, who took over from McArthur Towel & Sports Co. of Baraboo, Wisconsin, in 2013. The current cost of a towel is approximately $15 (in January 2026 at the Steelers' online store).

In 1996, Cope gave the rights to The Terrible Towel to the Allegheny Valley School in Coraopolis. The school provides care for more than 900 people with intellectual and physical disabilities, including Cope's autistic son, Danny. Proceeds from the Terrible Towel have helped raise more than $6 million for the school.

During the 2005 season, when the Steelers won their fifth Super Bowl, more than 1 million Towels were sold; some fans bought 200 Towels at a time.

== Widespread recognition ==
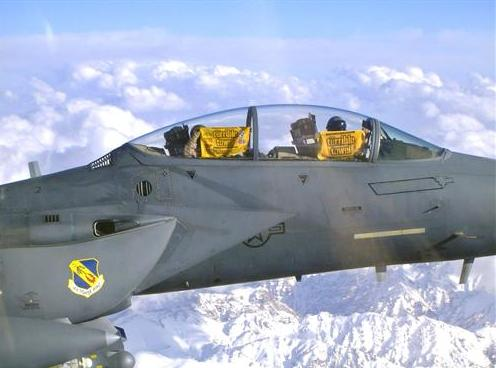
Air Force F-15E Strike Eagle pilot, Captain Daniel Susich, showing their Terrible Towels in flight over Afghanistan

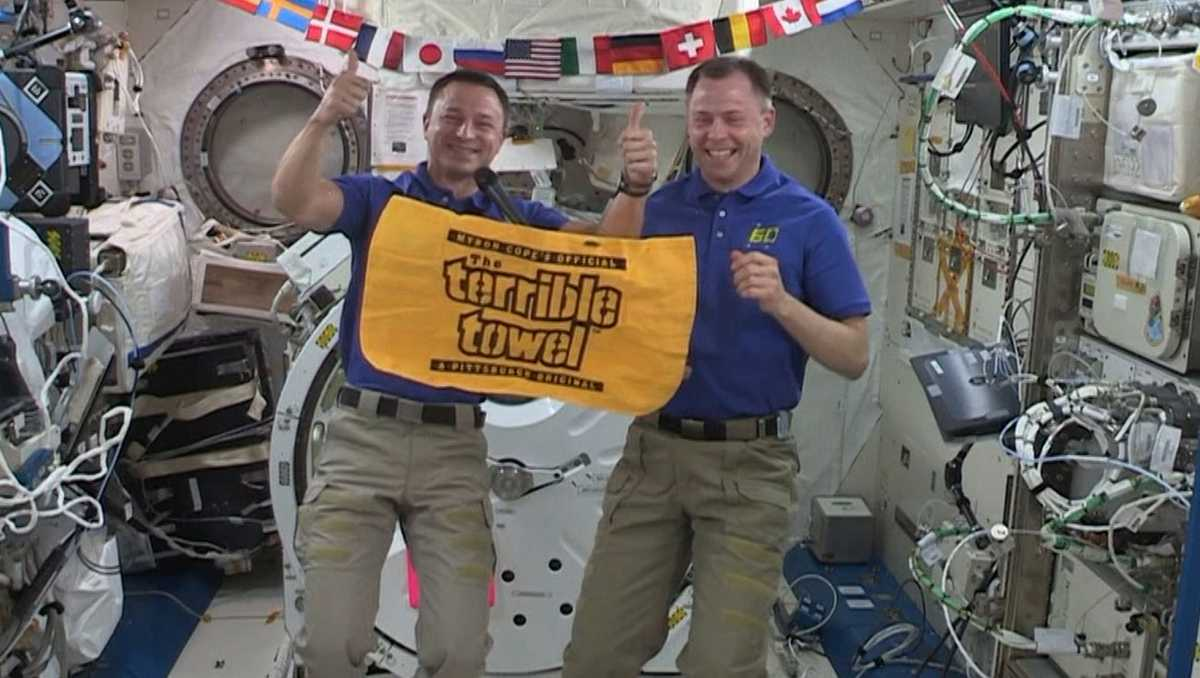
Terrible towel on the International Space Station

Upon its invention, Cope commented on the multi-functional ability of The Terrible Towel, "I'll tell 'em they can use the towel to wipe their seats clean. They can use it as a muffler against the cold. They can drape it over their heads if it rains." However, the Towel is often used by fans who do not attend games. Fans often drape the Towel over their radios or television sets; some even dress their pets or babies with it.

It has become a tradition for Steelers fans to take Terrible Towels on vacation, taking pictures next to well-known tourist destinations. Fans have taken the Towel to locations such as the Great Wall of China, the South Pole, Vatican City, and to the top of Mount Kilimanjaro. Hampton native Kevin Cherilla took his Terrible Towel during his climb to the peak of Mount Everest.

Military personnel have taken pictures with the Towel while stationed in Iraq and Afghanistan as part of the war on terrorism. Fans waved Terrible Towels at the gold medal match for Women's beach volleyball at the 2008 Olympic Games. Prior to the 2008 AFC Championship Game, astronaut Colonel Mike Fincke, a Pittsburgh native, waved the Terrible Towel from the International Space Station. The Terrible Towel is seen in the Scrubs season five episode "My Bright Idea", hanging on the cork board of Carla and Turk's apartment as she comes out of the bathroom after performing what she believes to be another unsuccessful pregnancy test. During her campaign for the 2008 Presidential Election, Hillary Clinton received a Terrible Towel during a visit to Pittsburgh. During the 2009 G-20 Pittsburgh summit, visiting dignitaries received Terrible Towels in gift bags from the city. The Terrible Towel is displayed prominently and waved by rapper Wiz Khalifa in the music video for his song Black and Yellow, which debuted during the 2010 NFL season. The Terrible Towel made an appearance in an episode in season 12 of Dancing with the Stars on March 21, 2011. After Hines Ward danced, Hall of Fame Pittsburgh Steelers running back Franco Harris is seen twirling the towel. Pittsburgh native Meghan Klingenberg waved a Terrible Towel after scoring a goal at Heinz Field during the US Women's National Team victory tour following the 2015 World Cup.

=== Honoring Cope ===
In 2005, Cope retired after 35 years as the Steelers radio announcer – the longest tenure of any broadcaster with a single team in NFL history. Cope was honored by the Steelers with the release of a limited special edition Towel, featuring his name and catch phrases. Cope was made an honorary co-captain for the Steelers for a Monday night game against the Baltimore Ravens. Cope led the fans in a towel wave at half time; the Towel that Cope used is now in the Pro Football Hall of Fame.

In response to how he would like to be remembered, Cope responded, "When I kick the bucket, there'll be a little story that'll say, 'Creator of Towel Dead'". On February 27, 2008, Cope died of respiratory failure in Pittsburgh. The following day, an article from the Associated Press concerning Cope's death was entitled "Former Steelers broadcaster, Terrible Towel creator Cope dies". Upon Cope's death, over 350 fans gathered in downtown Pittsburgh in snowy weather for a tribute. The ceremony concluded with one minute of silent Towel waving. Days later, Saturday Night Live cast member Seth Meyers waved a Terrible Towel on Saturday Night Live in tribute to Cope.

When Cope died in 2008, his daughter draped his coffin with a quilt made from Terrible Towels that were sewn together by a fan. She chose the quilt because it represents the many different people who touched their lives.

=== Opposition ===
"I did not see the Terrible Towel as witchcraft to hex the enemy. It would be a positive force, driving the Steelers to superhuman performance, but if it experienced a yen for mischief and created fatal mistakes by opponents, I would tolerate that."

— Myron Cope

Since the inception of the Terrible Towel, numerous opposing teams, mascots, and players have shown disrespect or have defaced the Terrible Towel. Many of these incidents have seen the opposition later suffer, leading to belief in "The Curse of the Towel."

Before a 1994 playoff game against the Cleveland Browns, Steelers defensive tackle Brentson Buckner accidentally dropped a Towel that he was waving during the player introductions. Browns running back Earnest Byner stepped on the Towel yelling, "We don't care about your towel. We're going to beat you this time." This act "provok[ed] other Steelers and Browns to mingle. Not affectionately." The Steelers won the game 29–9.

During a December 4, 2005 game at Heinz Field, T. J. Houshmandzadeh of the Cincinnati Bengals wiped his feet on a Towel after he scored a touchdown. Although the Bengals managed a 7-point victory in that regular season game, the Steelers came back to defeat them 31–17 in the playoffs, on their way to a victory in Super Bowl XL. The Bengals did not reach the playoffs again until the 2009–10 season, after Houshmandzadeh had left the team.

Before the September 29, 2008 game at Heinz Field, Baltimore Ravens wide receiver Derrick Mason stomped on a Terrible Towel. The Ravens then went on to lose all three of their 2008 season games against the Steelers, including the 2008 AFC Championship Game.

On October 8, 2008, the Steelers played the Jacksonville Jaguars at Jacksonville Municipal Stadium. At that point of their season, the Jaguars were 2–2, and feeling very hopeful for the season following a defeat at home of their division rival Indianapolis Colts. The game was very close going into the second half, and the Steelers were still stinging from a Mathis interception and runback for a touchdown. Shortly after the start of the third quarter, Jaguars mascot Jaxson de Ville stood alongside some cheerleaders, and produced a Terrible Towel, which he used to rub his armpits and buttocks. Shortly after that, the Steelers ran away with the game and upset the Jaguars 26–21.

On December 21, 2008, LenDale White and Keith Bulluck of the Tennessee Titans stepped on a Terrible Towel after the Titans' 31–14 victory. Pittsburgh's Larry Foote responded, "They deserved to do that, they whooped us, they deserve to celebrate and, hopefully, we'll see them again." While Hines Ward said, "[T. J. Houshmandzadeh] did kind of the same thing and you see where they went." Former Steelers head coach Bill Cowher, by this point working for CBS as an analyst on The NFL Today, mentioned on the program that such antics can come back to haunt teams. Tennessee was the top seed in the playoffs, however following the incident the Titans proceeded to lose eight consecutive games, including an '08 divisional playoff game and their '09 Week 1 game against the Steelers, 13–10. After the Titans' 8th consecutive loss, which was a 59–0 shutout loss at the hands of the New England Patriots in Week 6, the Titans worst loss ever. Titans coach Jeff Fisher expressed regret for his team's behavior towards the Towel, and a number of Titans players autographed a Terrible Towel and mailed it to Allegheny Valley School – the Pittsburgh charity that now owns the trademark. The Titans won their next 5 games.

On January 27, 2009, at a public sendoff in Phoenix for the Arizona Cardinals before they faced the Steelers in Super Bowl XLIII, Phoenix Mayor Phil Gordon produced a towel and called the Cardinals mascot, Big Red to the stage, where he used the towel to wipe his armpits. Gordon then blew his nose on the towel. The Cardinals then proceeded to lose the Super Bowl to the Steelers, 27–23.

On October 11, 2009, the Steelers played the Detroit Lions at Ford Field. Nearing the end of the fourth quarter the Steelers were up by 8 points and the Lions were marching down the field. At this time the Lions mascot, Roary The Lion, stepped on, bit and ripped apart a Terrible Towel. Following this the Lions suffered three straight sacks to put them in a long fourth and twenty-eight situation. The Lions did not convert and the Steelers won the game 28–20.

Several Blue and White "Terrific Towels" were made for the Indianapolis Colts in the 2009 season playoffs, one of which received some airtime during their AFC championship victory. The Colts subsequently lost Super Bowl XLIV to the New Orleans Saints.

After a 13–10 Ravens win in Pittsburgh on November 18, 2012, Ray Rice walked off the field waving a Terrible Towel over his head and singing Steelers rally song "Renegade" with teammates. Rice publicly stated after the game that no disrespect was intended. Two weeks later on December 2, the Ravens lost to the Steelers 23-20 despite being at home and facing Pittsburgh's third-string quarterback, Charlie Batch. Losing four of their last five games notwithstanding, Baltimore would go on to win the AFC North and follow that with a playoff run to become Super Bowl XLVII Champions, giving them the distinction of being the first and only team in NFL history to have shown disrespect toward the Terrible Towel and win the Super Bowl. However, prior to the 2014 season, Ray Rice was suspended due to a domestic violence incident in the offseason and was subsequently released and has not been signed by another team since. Furthermore, up until their Super Bowl victory the Ravens had made the playoffs in each of the first five seasons under John Harbaugh and Joe Flacco but have had only one playoff appearance (and only one winning season) over the next four years, albeit their one playoff victory during that span being against the Steelers.

At an October 5, 2014, game between the Steelers and the Jacksonville Jaguars at EverBank Field, which the Steelers won 17–9, Jaguars mascot Jaxson de Ville was seen holding a Terrible Towel on one hand and a handwritten sign that reads "Towels Carry Ebola" on the other hand, mentioning the deadly outbreak that started in West Africa. The next day, the Jaguars issued an apology for the incident.

On February 7, 2016, the Florida Panthers' mascot, Stanley C. Panther, blew his nose into a Terrible Towel, with the Pittsburgh Penguins down 0–2 with around six minutes left in the third period. Following this, the Penguins then tied the game in regulation and won in overtime. According to Elias Sports Bureau, this was the first time in Pittsburgh Penguins franchise history that they have overcome a 2–0 deficit to win with six minutes left in the game. Kris Letang scored the OT winner, and Sidney Crosby tied the game with the goaltender pulled late in regulation. The Panthers went on to lose in the first round of the 2016 Stanley Cup playoffs while the Penguins went on to win the Stanley Cup.

On September 12, 2016, before the Steelers' 2016 season opener against the Washington Redskins on Monday Night Football, Redskins punter Tress Way posted a video on Twitter of a spirit video his mother sent him, which culminated in her burning a Terrible Towel. The Steelers won the game 38–16.

On December 18, 2016, Bengals running back Jeremy Hill tried ripping a Terrible Towel after scoring a touchdown to give the Bengals a 17–3 lead against the Steelers. Hill had six carries for −1 yards after, while also leaving the field several times with an apparent injury to his knee. The Bengals also blew their lead and lost 24–20 while being shut out in the second half, and were eliminated from playoff contention that day. After attempting to rip the Terrible Towel, Hill finished the 2016 season with 15 carries for 30 yards while missing week 17 with an injury.

On October 29, 2023, the Jacksonville Jaguars defeated the Steelers 20−10 at Acrisure Stadium. During the game, several Jacksonville players took fans’ Terrible Towels, mockingly waved them around, and dropped them. The Jaguars, who were 6–2 after defeating Pittsburgh, went on to lose 6 of their final 9 games in 2023. They were eliminated from the playoffs after a Week 18 loss to the Tennessee Titans, allowing Pittsburgh to clinch a playoff berth as the 7th seed.

On November 9, 2025, the Los Angeles Chargers defeated the Steelers 25–10 at Sofi Stadium. After the game, the Chargers posted to their X account a meme calling the Terrible Towel “worthless”. The following week, the Chargers were blown out by the Jaguars 35–6.

On January 12, 2026, the Houston Texans defeated the Steelers 30−6 at Acrisure Stadium in the AFC Wild Card Round of the playoffs. After the game, their mascot, Toro, posted a video of himself ripping a Terrible Towel in half to social media. They would go on to lose to the New England Patriots 28−16 in the Divisional Round the following week, and continue losing into the next season, losing all of their preseason games and first four regular season games. After the fourth regular season loss, Toro posted a video of himself attempting to repair the ripped Terrible Towel. The Texans won their subsequent game against the Tennessee Titans 26−3.

== Similar gimmicks ==
During his coaching career from 1922 to 1964, E. A. Diddle of Western Kentucky University began carrying a red towel with him during the basketball games he coached. Diddle would wave and throw the towel during games, and the concept was adopted by fans of the college. It became an official part of the school logo in 1971. Fans of the undefeated 1972 Miami Dolphins cheered the team by waving the "Horrible Hanky"—white handkerchiefs. However, the handkerchiefs were deemed "too dainty" for football, and the tradition faded. "Hate the Yankees Hankies", in reference to the franchise's rivalry with the New York Yankees, were handkerchiefs distributed to Cleveland Indians fans in September 1977 in a promotion.

The Terrible Towel is traditionally known as the first "rally towel"; its popularity has spawned similar traditions for other teams. Fans of the Minnesota Twins cheer the team with the "Homer Hanky" during the playoffs. The Philadelphia Phillies have distributed white towels to fans during home games. During a 2006 playoff game against the Steelers, the Indianapolis Colts handed out blue towels to rally fans, however, Pittsburgh went on to win the game. In a 2000 preseason game, played in Mexico City, many fans that filled the 100,000 seat Aztec Stadium waved towels. Cope, glad that the Allegheny Valley School would receive a sizable donation from the proceeds, was later disappointed to learn the towels waved by the fans were "knockoffs" made by local artists, and therefore no proceeds would go to the school. In 2008, the NFL approved a white towel entitled the Trophy Towel, which will be sold to fans and given to the winning team of Super Bowl XLIII. Members of the Steelers criticized the idea, and broadcaster Bill Hillgrove, who worked with Cope, called the idea "a cheap imitation". Steelers player Aaron Smith stated, "It started here, so why would anyone else want to have a towel? Why not kazoos?" During the 2010 Memorial Cup the host committee made up 8,000 yellow towels to represent the host team, the Brandon Wheat Kings, who played the Moncton Wildcats. Many fans brought the towels back for games after that.

== See also ==
- Green Weenie
- Towel Power
