= Western Center =

- Pennsylvania Department of Public Welfare
- A map showing the Western Center's location in Pennsylvania

Geography
- Location: Cecil Township, Washington County, Pennsylvania, United States
- Coordinates: 40.27436°N 80.16642°W

History
- Closed: 2000
- Demolished: 2011

Links
- Lists: Hospitals in Pennsylvania

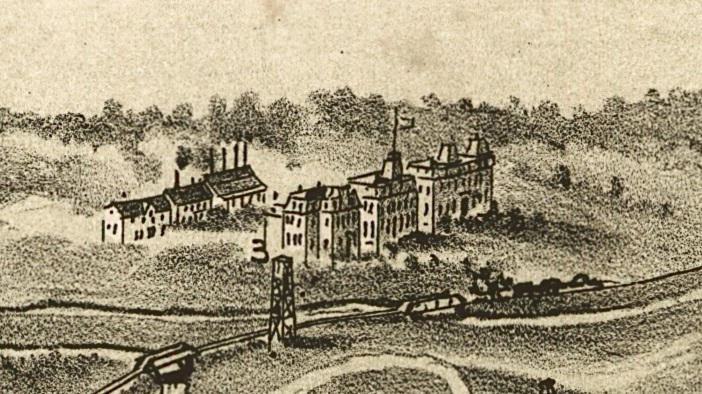
A view of The Pennsylvania Reform School at Morganza in 1897.

Western State School and Hospital, later known as Western Center, was a state-run mental hospital and reform school located near Canonsburg, Pennsylvania. It was best known for serving individuals with intellectual disabilities. Throughout its history, the institution was also referred to as the Pennsylvania Reform School, Youth Development Center of Canonsburg, and The House of Refuge. Locally, it was commonly known as Morganza. The center was a prominent part of the Canonsburg community, even featuring as a stop on tours during local festivals.

The exterior of Western Center's administration building was used as the setting for the Baltimore State Hospital for the Criminally Insane, where Hannibal Lecter was incarcerated, in the 1991 film The Silence of the Lambs and its 2002 prequel Red Dragon.

== History and closure ==
The Pennsylvania Reform School, originally known as the House of Refuge of Western Pennsylvania, was established in 1850 as a reform school for delinquent children from the local area. Initially located on the north shore of the Ohio River, the school relocated in 1872 to Morganza, an area northeast of Canonsburg, Pennsylvania, in Washington County. In 1876, the school was renamed the Pennsylvania Reform School. It housed youths under the age of 21, many of whom were convicted of crimes such as theft, larceny, rape, and murder. The institution enforced strict discipline policies, and students were often contracted out for labor on nearby farms.

In 1911, in an effort to shed the stigma associated with being a reform school, the institution was renamed the Pennsylvania Industrial Training School. The name changed again in 1960 to the Canonsburg Youth Development Center. Two years later, in 1962, a hospital for mentally disabled individuals opened on the campus. Over time, the Youth Development Center was phased out, and the mental hospital, eventually known as Western Center, took over some of the former reformatory buildings.

In 1986, the Washington County Redevelopment Authority acquired land surrounding Western Center. The area was considered ideal due to its access to Interstate 79, proximity to Pittsburgh, and low tax rates.

In 1992, Western Center became the focus of a lawsuit filed by disability advocates against the Pennsylvania Department of Public Welfare. The resulting settlement allowed the state to relocate residents to community-based facilities.

Construction on Phase I of Southpointe, a business and residential development, began in 1993 on land near Western Center. In 1998, the state decided to close the facility, initiating plans to transfer the remaining 380 residents to community-based settings. The final closure occurred in 2000, with the last 56 residents moved to temporary housing before being placed in community-based facilities across Western Pennsylvania. The closure, which occurred unexpectedly, was controversial, especially because some residents were relocated to distant facilities, including the state's Ebensburg Center. Attempts by the employees' union, residents' families, and original litigants from the 1992 lawsuit to halt the closure were unsuccessful. Many residents were eventually moved to community-based facilities managed by Allegheny Valley School.

The administration building, the last remaining structure, was demolished in late 2011. The land around the former center was eventually integrated into Southpointe, with the site itself being redeveloped under brownfield status. By 2013, Phase II of Southpointe was completed, covering a total of 800 acres (320 ha). A third phase, to be called Cool Valley Industrial Park, is planned for the other side of Interstate 79.

== Reputation ==
In 2011, David E. Stuart, a professor at the University of New Mexico and a former employee of Western State School and Hospital during the 1960s, published a book based on his experiences. In the book, Stuart recounts the history of abuse and neglect that the reform school at Morganza had become notorious for. During the 1950s and 1960s, local parents would even threaten to send misbehaving children to "Morganza" as a form of discipline.

In 2014, Christopher R. Barraclough authored Morganza: Pennsylvania's Reform School, a book that explores the history of the reform school. The book is part of the "Images of America" series published by Arcadia Publishing.
