= Homer Hanky =

American handkerchief

A 1991 Homer Hanky

The Official Star Tribune Homer Hanky is a handkerchief-like rally towel printed for the Minnesota Twins. It was first introduced during the 1987 pennant race by the Minneapolis Star Tribune as a promotional item when the Twins won the American League Western division (AL West). Homer Hankies have been reprinted with different designs over the years to commemorate various occasions, including division titles, the inaugural opening day at Target Field, and the 2014 All Star Game. The Homer Hanky has been manufactured by several companies over the years, including Bensussen, Deutsch & Associates LLC and Winona, Minnesota based company, WinCraft Inc.

== Years ==
=== 1987 ===
Star Tribune promotions manager Terrie Robbins thought up the idea of a Homer Hanky as a way to promote the newspaper during the Twins' 1987 playoff run. In a 2010 article, Tim McGuire, managing editor of the Star Tribune, contended that the beginnings of the Hanky were not without opposition from the Twins. He cites the organization's concerns from distracting players to being "the laughing stock of baseball". After handing out 60,000 Homer Hanky and a second inning Gary Gaetti home run in Game 1 of the ALCS, Terrie recalls, "I get teary-eyed and get goose bumps just telling you this, but when I looked, the stadium was awash with hankies cheering the Twins." In the coming weeks, a total of 2.3 million hankies were distributed.

The October 7, 1987 debut of the Homer Hanky was ranked #11 on the Top 100 Metrodome Moments

- Occasion: AL West Champions
- Image: Red, baseball-shaped logo
- Slogan: "Championship Drive"
- Printed at the end of the season
- Twins won World Series (4–1 ALCS def Detroit Tigers, 4–3 WS, def St. Louis Cardinals)

=== 1988 ===
Before the start of the 1988 season, the Star Tribune and the Twins developed their own versions of a new white hanky, though there were talks about merging the ideas. Since the Star Tribune owned the Homer Hanky trademark, its version became the official Homer Hanky, while the Twins sold separate white hanky with the team's 1988 logo.

- Occasion: Celebration of 1987 World Series Championship and hopes of a repeat
- Image: Red, baseball diamond-shaped logo.
- Slogan: "Just As Great In '88"
- Printed at the beginning of the season
- Twins finished 2nd in AL West behind the Oakland Athletics

=== 1991 ===
- Occasion: AL West Champions
- Image: Red, baseball-shaped logo.
- Slogan: "The Magic Is Back"
- Printed at the end of the season
- Twins won World Series (4-1 ALCS def Toronto Blue Jays, 4-3 WS, def Atlanta Braves)

=== 2002 ===
In 2002 there seems to be two sizes of the Homer Hanky "Proud and Loud". A larger and "normal" size of 15 1/2 inch square and a smaller size of 13 1/2 inches square with "hanky stitching" on the edge.

- Occasion: AL Central Champions
- Image: Red, baseball-shaped logo.
- Slogan: "Proud and Loud"

=== 2003 ===
- Occasion: AL Central Champions
- Image: Blue, baseball-shaped logo.
- Slogan: "Every Fan Counts"

=== 2004 ===
- Occasion: AL Central Champions
- Image: Red, outline of a baseball field
- Printed at the end of the season

=== 2006 ===
- Occasion: AL Central Champions
- Image: Red, State of Minnesota with Minnie and Paul Logo (similar to the Twins logo from 1961 to 1986)

=== 2007 ===
- Occasion: 20th Anniversary of the 1987 World Series victory
- Image: 1987 World Series logo
- Slogan: "20th Anniversary Homer Hanky"

=== 2009 ===
- Occasion: AL Central Championship (6–5 victory against the Detroit Tigers in Game 163)
- Image: Red Minnesota
- Slogan: "This is Twins Territory"

=== 2010 ===
- Regular Season Hanky
  - Occasion: 2010 Home Opener at Target Field (Inaugural game of the inaugural season at Target Field)
  - Image: Official Target Field inaugural season logo
  - Slogan: "The Official Opening Day Homer Hanky" with "April 12th, 2010 Twins vs. Red Sox" across the bottom.
- Postseason Hanky
  - Occasion: AL Central Champions
  - Image: Minnie and Paul logo
  - Slogan: "Championship Drive"

=== 2014 ===
- Occasion: All-Star Game on July 11, 2014.
- Image: Solid red Minnesota
- Slogan: "All Star Week 2014"

=== 2019 ===
The Star Tribune announced, in celebration of the Twins winning the AL Central regular season division championship in 2019, that a new Homer Hanky would be released. They noted that the new hanky will not be white, as in previous years. This was the result of Major League Baseball adding a new rule forbidding white rally towels. It also took on a different fabric, changing to a thicker towel rather than a thin handkerchief. On April 19, 2020, in the midst of the COVID-19 pandemic, it was announced that the Twins would use leftover 2019 Homer Hankies to make CDC compliant face masks and donate them to health care and grocery workers. This was done in conjunction with Cub Foods, Love Your Melon, and Faribault Woolen Mill Co.

- Occasion: AL Central Champions
- Image: White baseball outline on red towel
- Slogan: "Welcome to BOMBA SZN"

=== 2020 ===
The 2020 Homer Hanky retained the thicker towel fabric from 2019, but it did return to the traditional white color. Since fans were not allowed in the stadium during the playoffs, there would be no violation of MLB's white towel rule.

- Occasion: AL Central Champions
- Image: White outline of Minnesota with a red house at the bottom
- Slogan: 2020 Homer Hanky

=== 2023 ===
The 2023 Homer Hanky returned to the original fabric, but switched back to the red color to avoid violating MLB's white towel rule.

- Occasion: AL Central Champions
- Image: Slogan in front of a horizontal striped background
- Slogan: We Believe

== See also ==
- Handy horn
- Rally towel
- Terrible Towel
- Vuvuzela
