= Clarendon =

Clarendon may refer to:

== Places ==
=== Australia ===
- Clarendon, New South Wales, a suburb of Sydney
- Clarendon, Queensland, a rural locality in the Somerset Region
- Clarendon, South Australia
- Clarendon, Victoria, in the Shire of Moorabool
- Clarendon County, New South Wales

=== Canada ===
- Clarendon Parish, New Brunswick
  - Clarendon, a community in Petersville Parish, New Brunswick, near Clarendon Parish
- Clarendon Station, Ontario
- Clarendon, Quebec

=== England ===
- Clarendon Park, Leicester
- Clarendon Park, Wiltshire

- Clarendon Palace, within the park

- Great Clarendon Street and Little Clarendon Street, Oxford

=== Jamaica ===
- Clarendon Parish, Jamaica
- Clarendon Park, Jamaica

=== United States ===
- Clarendon, Arkansas
- Clarendon, New York
- Clarendon, North Carolina
- Clarendon, Pennsylvania
- Clarendon, Texas
- Clarendon, Vermont
- Clarendon, Arlington, Virginia
- Clarendon County, South Carolina
- Clarendon Township, Michigan

== People ==
- Earl of Clarendon, a peerage of England
- Edward Hyde, 1st Earl of Clarendon (1609–1674), English historian, Chancellor of the Exchequer, Lord Chancellor, and a close political advisor to Charles II
- Frederick Clarendon (c.1820–1904), Irish architect
- Layshia Clarendon (born 1991), American basketball player

== Other uses ==
- The Clarendon Academy, secondary school in Trowbridge, England
- Clarendon Building, University of Oxford, England
- Clarendon Commission, 1861 investigation of leading schools in England
- Clarendon Consolidated Independent School District, Texas, United States
- Clarendon County School District, South Carolina, United States
- Clarendon Film Company, early British film studio
- Clarendon Fund, scholarship scheme at the University of Oxford, England
- Clarendon House, mansion in Piccadilly, London
- Clarendon Laboratory, Oxford University, England
- Clarendon, part of Nottingham College
- Clarendon Palace, Wiltshire, England
  - Constitutions of Clarendon, legislative procedures passed by Henry II of England in 1164
- Clarendon Press, Oxford, England
- Clarendon School, historic school building in Arlington, Virginia, United States
- Clarendon School for Girls, a defunct girls' private school at various sites in the United Kingdom
- Clarendon School District, Arkansas, United States
- Clarendon Stakes, Canadian horse race
- Clarendon Way, long-distance footpath in Hampshire and Wiltshire, England
- Clarendon (typeface), slab serif typeface
- Clarendon (Washington Metro), D.C. subway station
- Clarendon-Linden fault system, New York state, United States
- Lord Clarendon (ship), Canadian sailing ship
- USS Clarendon, US Navy attack transport ship

== See also ==
- Clarendon College (disambiguation), a number of secondary schools
- Clarendon High School (disambiguation), a number of secondary schools
- Clarendon Hills (disambiguation)
- Clarendon Hotel (disambiguation)
