= Clarendon High School =

Clarendon High School may refer to:

- Clarendon High School for Girls, Eastern Cape, South Africa
- Clarendon High School, Clarendon, Arkansas, United States
- Clarendon High School, Clarendon, Texas, United States
- Clarendon House Grammar School for girls, Ramsgate, Kent, UK

== See also ==
- Clarendon School
- The Clarendon Academy
- Clarendon College (disambiguation)
- Clarendon (disambiguation)
