= Clarendon College =

Clarendon College may refer to:

- Clarendon College (Jamaica), a religious school in Clarendon parish, Jamaica
- Clarendon College (Texas), a two-year college in Clarendon, Texas, USA
- Ballarat Clarendon College, a school in Australia

== See also ==
- The Clarendon Academy (formerly called Clarendon College)
- Clarendon School
- Clarendon High School (disambiguation)
- Clarendon (disambiguation)
