= Clara H. Sully Carhart =

Canadian-born American educator and reformer (1843–1913)

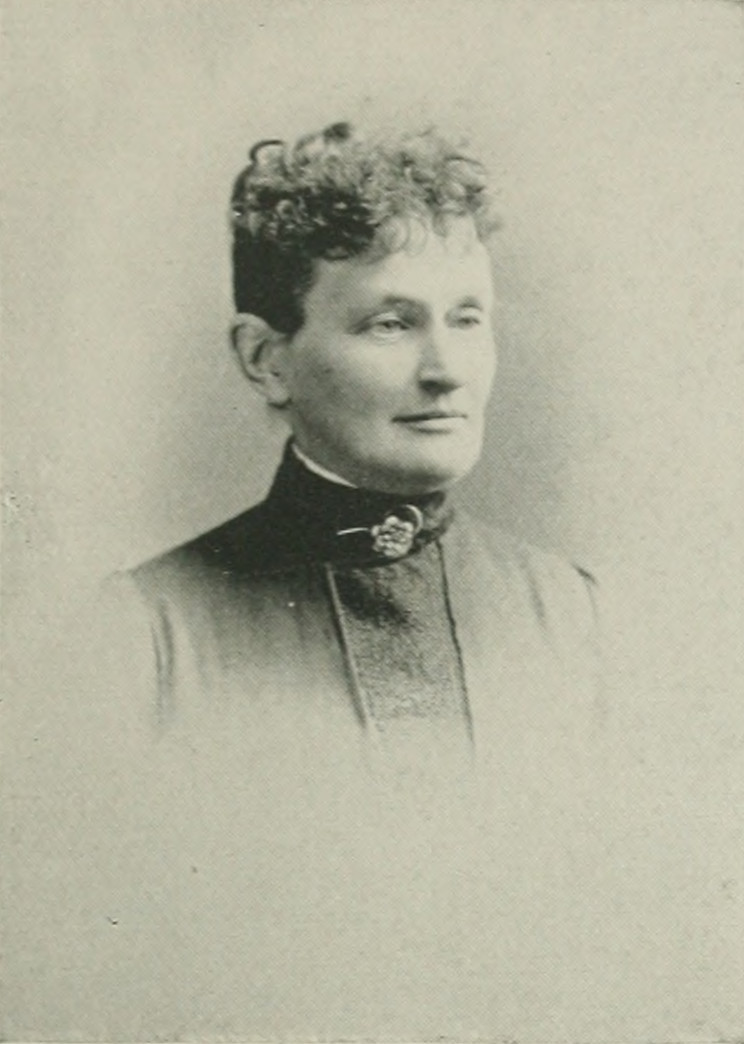
- Portrait photo from A Woman of the Century
- Born: Clara Hannah Sully; April 30, 1845; Ottawa, Canada
- Died: December 24, 1913 (aged 68); Augusta, Georgia, U.S.
- Occupations: educator; reformer
- Organizations: Woman's Christian Temperance Union; Women's Home Missionary Society of the Methodist Episcopal
- Spouse: Lewis H. Carhart (m. 1871)

Clara H. Sully Carhart (1843-1913) was a Canadian-born American educator and reformer. She was affiliated with the Woman's Christian Temperance Union (WCTU) and the Women's Home Missionary Society of the Methodist Episcopal (MEC). Carhart was a pioneer in establishing girls' clubs, which become an important factor in the lives of the working-girls of New York City and Brooklyn.

== Early life and education ==
Clara Hannah Sully was born in Ottawa, Canada, April 30, 1845. She was of English parentage. Her maternal grandfather, J. G. Hayter, who was a government official from the first settlement of that city, was descended from an old family of English nobility of that name. She was related to the well-known railroad family, Sully. Her brother, Albert, was employed by the New York investment firm of Austin and Corbett.

In early life, Carhart showed an unusual aptitude for books. She enjoyed her schoolwork, and decided to become a teacher. At ten years of age, she was sent to a boarding school in Ottawa, Canada, where she excelled in music. After two years she returned home, and studied in the Buffalo high school, until the removal of her parents to Darien Center, New York, where she attended the seminary.

== Career ==
After graduating, she began to teach. In 1861, after the death of her father, the family removed to Davenport, Iowa. She immediately entered the city school there and for six years, held a position as a teacher. At the solicitation of the school board, she inaugurated a system of musical instruction, including every grade of all the city schools.

On October 5, 1871, she married Rev. Lewis H. Carhart, a young MEC minister, and with him went to live in Charles City, Iowa. Their family consisted of two children. In that city, she entered into her husband's work and seconded his efforts to build up the church. While living in Marion, Iowa, during the State's prohibitory campaign, Carhart served as that city's WCTU president. In 1883, she served on the Board of Directors of the WCTU's The Union Signal.

Soon after the Civil War, she went to Texas with her husband, who had been a captain in the Union army, and had volunteered in the work of reorganizing the MEC in the South. They had to work in the face of bitter opposition, but, largely owing to Mrs. Carhart's activity and popularity, large congregations were formed and churches were built in Dallas, Sherman, and neighboring cities. Rev. Carhart founded the city of Clarendon in the Texas Panhandle as a dry Christian colony. It was named in honor of Clara, whose brother Alfred provided the new town with financial support. Clara, however, did not enjoy the settlement and maintained separate residences in Sherman and Dallas.

In 1881, her husband retired from the active ministry, and they went to make their home in Brooklyn, to be near Mrs. Carhart's family. There, Carhart became the secretary of one of the largest local WCTU unions, and afterward president of the young women's work in Suffolk County, New York. While on a visit in Donley County, Texas, she organized a local union, which union so became so popular with public sentiment that within eight months afterward, the saloons in that county were closed by popular vote.

Carhart became interested in the social condition of the working-girls of Brooklyn. Prominent women were called together from the churches of the city, and in 1885, they established the Bedford Club in the heart of a district where shop-girls and factory operatives lived. The aim was the bettering of the social condition of those girls, offering them amusements and instruction in practical skills. The work grew incredibly. Of that society, she was the first president. She was thus the pioneer in establishing girls' clubs, which become an important factor in the lives of the working-girls of New York City and Brooklyn.

For six years, Carhart held the position of corresponding secretary of the Women's Home Missionary Society of the MEC, in the New York East Conference, and she was a great factor in its success. For six years, she was sent as a representative to the national conventions, and in 1889, represented that society on the platform of the National WCTU in Chicago. At that convention, she became chair of the Ethical Instruction in the Public Schools standing committee, and as chair of the Iowa delegation, she was invited to sit with the conference's Executive Committee.

Carhart was also the founder of the MEC's Deaconess Home in Brooklyn on President Street.

She was a member of the advisory council of the woman's branch of the World's Columbian Exposition in Chicago, and of the Chiropean Club, Brooklyn.

== Death ==
She died in Augusta, Georgia on December 24, 1913, survived by her two children, Elsie and Albert. Interment was in Amityville, New York.
