= Clarendon High School (Texas) =

Location
- 420 South Allen Street; Clarendon, Texas 79226; United States; 34.939315°N 100.897573°W

Information
- School type: Public High School
- School district: Clarendon Independent School District
- Principal: Larry Jeffers
- Teaching staff: 18.57 (FTE)
- Grades: 9-12
- Enrollment: 138 (2023-2024)
- Student to teacher ratio: 7.43
- Colors: Maroon & White
- Athletics conference: UIL Class 2A
- Mascot: Bronco/Lady Bronco
- Yearbook: Instant Replay
- Website: Clarendon High School

Clarendon High School is a public high school located in Clarendon, Texas (USA) and classified as a 2A school by the UIL. It is part of the Clarendon Independent School District located in central Donley County. In 2015, the school was rated "Met Standard" by the Texas Education Agency.

== Athletics ==
The Clarendon Broncos compete in these sports

- Baseball
- Basketball
- Cross Country
- Football
- Golf
- Powerlifting
- Softball
- Tennis
- Track and Field

=== State titles ===
- Boys Basketball
  - 2021(2A), 2022(2A)

== Notable alumni ==
- Kenny King - NFL running back with the Houston Oilers and Oakland Raiders.
- William S. Lott - attorney and judge in Williamson County, Texas.
- Mac Thornberry - current member of the United States House of Representatives
