= Judge Lott =

Judge Lott may refer to:

- Charles Fayette Lott, California state court judge
- John A. Lott (1806–1878), judge of the court of Kings County, New York
- Peter Lott, judge in Quincy, Illinois
- Plummer Lott, judge of the New York City Criminal Court and the New York State Supreme Court
- William S. Lott (1918-2009), district judge of Williamson County, Texas
