= Clarendon Parish =

Clarendon Parish may refer to:

- Clarendon Parish, Jamaica
- Clarendon Parish, New Brunswick, Canada

== See also ==
- Clarendon (disambiguation)
