= Kenny King (running back) =

American gridiron football player (born 1957)

No. 30, 32, 33
- Position: Running back

Personal information
- Born: March 7, 1957 (age 69); Clarendon, Texas, U.S.
- Listed height: 5 ft 11 in (1.80 m)
- Listed weight: 203 lb (92 kg)

Career information
- High school: Clarendon
- College: Oklahoma
- NFL draft: 1979: 3rd round, 72nd overall pick

Career history
- Houston Oilers (1979); Oakland/Los Angeles Raiders (1980–1985); Hamilton Tiger-Cats (1987)

Awards and highlights
- 2× Super Bowl champion (XV, XVIII); Pro Bowl (1980); Second-team All-Big Eight (1978)

Career NFL statistics
- Rushing yards: 2,477
- Rushing average: 4.3
- Rushing touchdowns: 7
- Stats at Pro Football Reference

Kenneth Leon King (born March 7, 1957) is an American former professional football player who was a running back for seven seasons in the National Football League (NFL), primarily with the Oakland/Los Angeles Raiders. He played college football for the Oklahoma Sooners. He was a starter for the Raiders in Super Bowl XV and Super Bowl XVIII.

== High school ==
Kenny King was one of the best running backs in Texas while at Clarendon High School. He was inducted into the Texas Panhandle Sports Hall of Fame in 2008. Kenny ran behind mean green Larry Shields, his fullback.

== College career ==
After a stellar high school career, Kenny King played tailback and fullback at University of Oklahoma in the famed wishbone offense under Barry Switzer. King led the team in Rushing in 1976 with 791 yards on 141 carries for a 5.6 average; he also had 4 touchdowns. He shared the backfield with Heisman Trophy winner Billy Sims.

== Professional career ==
After attending Oklahoma, King was drafted in the third round (72nd overall) of the 1979 NFL draft by the Houston Oilers. After his first season in Houston, the Oilers traded King to the Oakland Raiders where he spent the rest of his career, and followed them to Los Angeles upon the team's move there in 1982. King set a Super Bowl record for the longest touchdown reception with an 80-yarder in the Raiders 27-10 Super Bowl XV victory over the Philadelphia Eagles. That record stood until it was surpassed by Green Bay Packer Antonio Freeman's 81-yard touchdown pass from Brett Favre in Super Bowl XXXI. He played one season for the CFL's Hamilton Tiger-Cats in 1987, playing in 2 games for them that season before retiring.
