= Howardwick, Texas =

- City
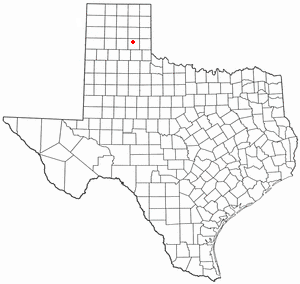
- Location of Howardwick, Texas

- Coordinates: 35°02′05″N 100°54′28″W
- Country: United States
- State: Texas
- County: Donley

Area
  - Total: 2.03 sq mi (5.26 km^{2})
  - Land: 2.03 sq mi (5.26 km^{2})
  - Water: 0 sq mi (0.00 km^{2})
- Elevation: 2,759 ft (841 m)

Population (2020)
  - Total: 370
  - Density: 180/sq mi (70/km^{2})
- Time zone: UTC-6 (Central (CST))
  - Summer (DST): UTC-5 (CDT)
- FIPS code: 48-35072
- GNIS feature ID: 2410797
- Website: cityofhowardwick.com

Howardwick is a city in Donley County, Texas, United States. Its population was 370 at the 2020 census.

== Geography ==
Howardwick is located northwest of the center of Donley County. It is on the north side of Greenbelt Reservoir, an impoundment on the Salt Fork Red River. Texas State Highway 70 runs past the eastern side of the city, leading south 8 miles (13 km) to Clarendon, the county seat, and north 11 miles (18 km) to Interstate 40.

According to the United States Census Bureau, Howardwick has a total area of 1.9 square miles (4.9 km^{2}), all land.

== Demographics ==
Historical population
Census	Pop.	Note	%±
1980	165		—
1990	211		27.9%
2000	437		107.1%
2010	402		−8.0%
2020	370		−8.0%
U.S. Decennial Census; 2020 Census

=== 2020 census ===
As of the 2020 census, Howardwick had a population of 370. The median age was 58.8 years; 15.4% of residents were under 18 and 33.8% were 65 or older. For every 100 females, there were 109.0 males, and for every 100 females 18 and over, there were 111.5 males 18 and over.

None of the residents lived in urban areas, while 100.0% lived in rural areas.

Of the 188 households in Howardwick, 16.5% had children under 18 living in them, 47.3% were married-couple households, 28.7% were households with a male householder and no spouse or partner present, and 21.8% were households with a female householder and no spouse or partner present. About 38.3% of all households were made up of individuals, and 20.7% had someone living alone who was 65 age or older.

The city had 362 housing units, of which 48.1% were vacant. The homeowner vacancy rate was 1.2% and the rental vacancy rate was 19.4%.

Racial composition as of the 2020 census
Race	Number	Percentage
White	323	87.3%
Black or African American	0	0.0%
American Indian and Alaska Native	5	1.4%
Asian	0	0.0%
Native Hawaiian and other Pacific Islander	0	0.0%
Some other race	14	3.8%
Two or more races	28	7.6%
Hispanic or Latino (of any race)	31	8.4%

=== 2000 census ===
As of the 2000 census, 437 people, 203 households, and 146 families were residing in the city. The population density was 240.6 people/sq mi (92.7/km^{2}). The 430 housing units averaged 236.8/sq mi (91.2/km^{2}). The racial makeup of the city was 97.94% White, 0.23% African American, 0.69% Native American, 0.23% from other races, and 0.92% from two or more races. Hispanics or Latinos of any race were 4.81% of the population.

Of the 203 households, 15.8% had children under 18 living with them, 66.5% were married couples living together, 3.9% had a female householder with no husband present, and 27.6% were not families. About 25.6% of all households were made up of individuals, and 8.9% had someone living alone who was 65 years of age or older. The average household size was 2.15, and the average family size was 2.51.

In the city, the age distribution was 15.8% under 18, 2.7% from 18 to 24, 14.4% from 25 to 44, 40.7% from 45 to 64, and 26.3% who were 65 or older. The median age was 54 years. For every 100 females, there were 100.5 males. For every 100 females age 18 and over, there were 100.0 males.

The median income in the city for a household was $34,063 and for a family was $38,889. Males had a median income of $25,833 versus $21,563 for females. The per capita income for the city was $16,595. About 11.5% of families and 16.3% of the population were below the poverty line, including 46.2% of those under 18 and 8.2% of those 65 or over.

== Education ==
Howardwick is served by the Clarendon Consolidated Independent School District.
