= Super Bowl XV =

1981 Edition of the Super Bowl

Oakland Raiders (4) (AFC) (11–5)	Philadelphia Eagles (2) (NFC) (12–4)
27	10
Head coach: Tom Flores	Head coach: Dick Vermeil
	1	2	3	4	Total
OAK	14	0	10	3	27
PHI	0	3	0	7	10
- Date: January 25, 1981
- Kickoff time: 5:16 p.m. CST (UTC-6)
- Stadium: Louisiana Superdome; New Orleans, Louisiana
- MVP: Jim Plunkett, quarterback
- Favorite: Eagles by 3
- Referee: Ben Dreith
- Attendance: 76,135

Ceremonies
- National anthem: Helen O'Connell
- Coin toss: Marie Lombardi, widow of Vince Lombardi
- Halftime show: Jim Skinner Productions presents "Mardi Gras Festival"

TV in the United States
- Network: NBC
- Announcers: Dick Enberg, Merlin Olsen, John Brodie, and Len Dawson
- Nielsen ratings: 44.4 (68.29 million viewers)
- Market share: 63
- Cost of 30-second commercial: $324,000

Radio in the United States
- Network: CBS Radio
- Announcers: Jack Buck and Hank Stram

Super Bowl XV was an American football game between the American Football Conference (AFC) champion Oakland Raiders and the National Football Conference (NFC) champion Philadelphia Eagles to decide the National Football League (NFL) champion for the 1980 season. The Raiders defeated the Eagles by the score of 27–10, becoming the first wild card playoff team to win a Super Bowl.

The game was played at the Louisiana Superdome in New Orleans, Louisiana, on January 25, 1981, five days after the Iran hostage crisis ended. The game was thus held under patriotic fervor, as the pregame ceremonies honored the end of the crisis.

The Raiders were making their third Super Bowl appearance after posting an 11–5 regular season record, but losing a tiebreaker to the AFC West division winner San Diego Chargers. Oakland then advanced to the Super Bowl with playoff victories over the Houston Oilers, Cleveland Browns, and San Diego. The Eagles were making their first Super Bowl appearance after posting a 12–4 regular season record and postseason victories over the Minnesota Vikings and Dallas Cowboys.

Aided by two touchdown passes from quarterback Jim Plunkett, the Raiders jumped out to a 14–0 lead in the first quarter and the Eagles never recovered. Oakland linebacker Rod Martin also intercepted Philadelphia quarterback Ron Jaworski three times for a Super Bowl record. Plunkett was named the Super Bowl MVP after completing 13 of 21 passes for 261 yards and three touchdowns; he was the second Heisman Trophy winner to be named Super Bowl MVP, after Roger Staubach in Super Bowl VI.

== Background ==
=== Host selection process ===
The NFL awarded Super Bowl XV to New Orleans on March 13, 1979, at the owners' meetings in Honolulu. For the first time, three Super Bowl host cities were deliberated and selected at the same meeting (XV, XVI, and XVII). A total of eight cities submitted bids: New Orleans, Detroit (Silverdome), Pasadena (Rose Bowl), Los Angeles (Coliseum), Miami, Seattle (Kingdome), Dallas (Cotton Bowl), and Houston (Rice Stadium). New Orleans was selected for their fifth Super Bowl overall, and second at the Louisiana Superdome, cementing their status in the regular host rotation. Detroit (XVI) and Pasadena (XVII) were other cities chosen at the meeting.

After hosting five previous Super Bowls, Miami was noticeably left out, largely due the aging condition of the Orange Bowl, and for a hotel room mix-up at Super Bowl XIII two years earlier. Dolphins owner Joe Robbie, locked in an ongoing feud with the city of Miami and Dade County over stadium improvements or construction of a new stadium, actually lobbied against Miami hosting the game. Robbie convinced the other owners to vote down Miami, in an effort to gain leverage towards building a new stadium. South Florida would not be selected to host another Super Bowl until Joe Robbie Stadium was built, and it hosted XXIII.

=== Oakland Raiders ===
Super Bowl XV was the climax of Jim Plunkett's revival as an NFL starting quarterback. The 1970 Heisman Trophy winner was selected with the first pick of the 1971 NFL draft by the New England Patriots and was later named the 1971 NFL Rookie of the Year. But Plunkett suffered through five losing seasons with the Patriots and two uneven seasons with the San Francisco 49ers before being released as a free agent before the 1978 season.

Plunkett was signed by Oakland to be their backup quarterback, and thus he did not see much playing time, throwing no passes in 1978 and just 15 passes in 1979. Meanwhile, Oakland traded long time starting quarterback Ken Stabler in the 1979 off-season to replace him with Dan Pastorini, a former high school rival of Plunkett who had been selected two spots below him in the 1971 draft. After the Raiders started the 1980 season with a 2–3 record, Pastorini broke his leg and suddenly Plunkett was thrust into the starting role. The 33-year-old Plunkett got off to a bad start, throwing 5 interceptions in a 31–17 loss to the Kansas City Chiefs after relieving Pastorini. However, he recovered and led the Raiders to victory in 9 of their last 11 games in the season, qualifying for the playoffs as a wild card team. Plunkett made 165 out of 320 pass completions for 2,299 yards, 18 touchdown passes and 15 interceptions. He also contributed 141 rushing yards and 2 touchdowns on the ground.

The Raiders' main offensive deep threat was wide receiver Cliff Branch (44 receptions, 858 yards, 7 touchdowns), while wide receiver Bob Chandler contributed 49 receptions for 786 yards and 10 touchdowns. Running back Mark van Eeghen was the team's top rusher with 838 yards and 5 touchdowns, while also catching 29 passes for 259 yards. Six games into the season, the Raiders made a surprise trade, sending future Hall of Fame tight end Dave Casper to the Houston Oilers for one first round and two second round draft picks. Veteran tight end Raymond Chester proved to be a capable starter for the rest of the year, catching 28 passes for 366 yards and 4 touchdowns. Halfback Kenny King rushed for 761 yards and catching 22 passes for 145 yards. The Raiders also had an outstanding offensive line led by two future Hall of Famers, tackle Art Shell and guard Gene Upshaw. Upshaw became the first player to play in three Super Bowls with the same team in three different decades. He also played in Super Bowls II (1967) and XI (1976).

Oakland's defense, anchored by defensive linemen John Matuszak (8 sacks), Cedrick Hardman (9.5 sacks), and Dave Browning (6.5 sacks), led the league in forced turnovers (52) and interceptions (35). Defensive back Lester Hayes led the league in interceptions (13) and interception return yards (273), and was the league's Defensive Player of the Year. Safety Burgess Owens added three interceptions, returning them for 59 yards and a touchdown. The Raiders also had a trio of great linebackers: future Hall of Famer Ted Hendricks (3 interceptions, 4 fumble recoveries, 8.5 sacks) Pro Bowler Rod Martin (3 Interceptions), and standout rookie Matt Millen.

The Raiders were led by head coach Tom Flores, taking Oakland to the Super Bowl in only his second season.

=== Philadelphia Eagles ===
In 1980, under head coach Dick Vermeil, the Philadelphia Eagles, who had not played in a league championship since their 1960 NFL championship, advanced to their first Super Bowl. Philadelphia's offense ranked 6th in the league in scoring (384 points) and 8th in yards gained (5,519). The Eagles were led by quarterback Ron Jaworski, who completed 257 out of 451 passes for 3,529 yards during the regular season, including 27 touchdowns and only 12 interceptions. Another key player on the Eagles offense was halfback Wilbert Montgomery, who was widely considered one of the top running backs in the NFL after rushing for more than 1,200 yards in each of the previous two seasons. Injuries during the 1980 regular season had limited him to just 778 yards, but he proved he was fully recovered in the postseason by rushing for 194 yards in the NFC title game. Montgomery was also a superb receiver out of the backfield, recording 50 receptions for 407 yards. The other main deep threats on offense, wide receivers Harold Carmichael and Charlie Smith, along with tight end Keith Krepfle, combined for 125 receptions, 2,090 yards, and 16 touchdowns.

The Eagles' defense allowed the fewest points in the league during the regular season (222) while ranking second in fewest yards (4,443). Nose tackle Charlie Johnson anchored the line, and even managed to record 3 interceptions. Defensive end Claude Humphrey led the team in sacks with 14.5, while fellow defensive end Carl Hairston added 9 sacks and defensive tackle Ken Clarke had 7. Linebackers Jerry Robinson (4 fumble recoveries and 2 interceptions) and Bill Bergey excelled at both stopping the run and pass coverage. Philadelphia also had a fine secondary, led by veteran defensive backs Herman Edwards (3 interceptions) and Brenard Wilson (6 interceptions), along with rookie Roynell Young (4 interceptions). The Eagles' defense was a major factor in their hard-fought 10–7 victory over the Raiders in the regular season; they sacked Plunkett 8 times.

=== Playoffs ===
The Eagles advanced through the playoffs, defeating the Minnesota Vikings, 31–16, and the Dallas Cowboys, 20–7.

Meanwhile, Plunkett and the Raiders defeated the Houston Oilers 27–7, the Cleveland Browns 14–12 (on a play known as Red Right 88), and the San Diego Chargers 34–27. In doing so, Oakland became the second wild card team to advance to the Super Bowl since the 1970 merger, the first from the AFC, and the first wild card team to win three postseason rounds since the NFL expanded to a 10-team playoff format in 1978. Hayes had a spectacular performance in the playoffs, adding 5 more interceptions to give him a total of 18 picks in 19 games.

=== Super Bowl pregame news and notes ===
With the Eagles advancing to the Super Bowl, Philadelphia became the only North American city in which all four major sports teams played in their respective championships in one year. The 76ers lost to the Los Angeles Lakers in the 1980 NBA Finals, the Flyers lost to the New York Islanders in the 1980 Stanley Cup Final, and the Phillies defeated the Kansas City Royals in the 1980 World Series.

In the days before the game, most sports writers were speculating over whether, if the Raiders won, NFL Commissioner Pete Rozelle would present the Vince Lombardi Trophy to the team's owner Al Davis. Prior to the season, the league declined to approve the Raiders' proposal to move from the Oakland–Alameda County Coliseum in Oakland, California to the Los Angeles Memorial Coliseum in Los Angeles. In response, Davis sued the NFL for violating antitrust laws. The conflict caused much friction between Rozelle and Davis. (The Raiders would eventually win the lawsuit, allowing the team to move to Los Angeles before the 1982 season.)

Oakland became the first team to avenge a regular-season loss in the Super Bowl. The Eagles defeated the Raiders 10–7 on November 23 at Veterans Stadium.

This game marked the first Super Bowl where both teams used the 3–4 defensive formation as their base defense. The Raiders were the first team to use the 3–4 in the Super Bowl in Super Bowl XI against the Minnesota Vikings, although the Miami Dolphins used a version of the 3–4 ("53 defense") in Super Bowl VI, Super Bowl VII and Super Bowl VIII. The 3–4 would be used by at least one team in every Super Bowl between Super Bowl XV and game XXVIII.

The Raiders became the first team to appear in a Super Bowl in three different decades (1960s, 1970s and 1980s), having previously played in Super Bowls II and XI.

As of Super Bowl LVIII, this is the earliest Super Bowl from which both coaches are still living, and the earliest from which either coach is still living following the death of Bud Grant in March 2023.

== Broadcasting ==
The game was broadcast in the United States by NBC, with Dick Enberg in his first Super Bowl as a play-by-play announcer. There were three color commentators: Merlin Olsen sat next to Enberg, while John Brodie and Len Dawson worked in a separate broadcast booth. Bryant Gumbel and Mike Adamle of NFL '80 anchored the pregame, halftime, and postgame coverage. Bob Trumpy served as a studio analyst. Pete Axthelm reported on the issue of gambling addiction, via interviews with members of Gamblers Anonymous, in addition to his usual role making picks as to who he felt would win a particular game. NBC News correspondent John Dancy also had a report on the issue of ticket scalping. Also included were video performances from the Broadway production "Ain't Misbehavin'", with the cast performing Fats Waller's "The Joint is Jumpin'" and NBC following members of the New Orleans Police Department's vice squad as they sought to combat prostitution in the city.

Like the game two years before, NBC used the same custom, synthesizer-heavy theme in place of their regular music. This game would also be the first Super Bowl to air with closed captioning for the deaf and hard of hearing. Toward the end of NBC's coverage, a montage of the game, the arrival of the hostages following their release, and the inauguration of Ronald Reagan as the 40th President of the United States aired to the tune of "Celebration" by Kool & the Gang.

A repeat episode of CHiPs, "11-99: Officer Needs Help", served as NBC's Super Bowl lead-out program.

== Entertainment ==
The pregame festivities honored the end of the Iran hostage crisis (which was announced 5 days before the game), and featured a performance by the Southern University Band. A large yellow bow 80-foot (24 m) long and 30 feet (9.1 m) wide was attached to the outside of the Superdome, while miniature bows were given to fans and every player wore a yellow stripe on the back of their helmets. (Yellow bows had been used in the US throughout the hostages' time in captivity as a sign of support.)

Singer, actress, and dancer Helen O'Connell later sang the national anthem. The coin toss ceremony featured Marie Lombardi, the widow of Pro Football Hall of Fame Green Bay Packers head coach Vince Lombardi.

The halftime show, featuring singers and dancers, was a "Mardi Gras Festival", with a performance from "Up With People".

== Game summary ==
=== First quarter ===
Raiders linebacker Rod Martin intercepted Eagles quarterback Ron Jaworski's first pass of the game and returned it 17 yards to the Philadelphia 30-yard line, setting up quarterback Jim Plunkett's 2-yard touchdown pass to wide receiver Cliff Branch eight plays later, giving Oakland an early 7–0 lead. After the teams exchanged punts, Jaworski appeared to complete a 40-yard touchdown pass to wide receiver Rodney Parker on 3rd-and-10 that would have tied the game, but the score was nullified by an illegal motion penalty on wide receiver Harold Carmichael, and the Eagles ended up being forced to punt. On the Raiders' next possession, on third down from their own 20, Plunkett threw the ball to running back Kenny King at the 39-yard line as he was scrambling around in the backfield to avoid being sacked. Cornerback Herm Edwards appeared poised to intercept the ball, but it brushed off his fingertips and was deflected to King, who caught the pass and took off to the end zone for a Super Bowl-record 80-yard touchdown reception, giving the Raiders a 14–0 lead and tying the Miami Dolphins' record (which still stands) for the largest Super Bowl lead (14 points) at the end of the first quarter, set in Super Bowl VIII.

=== Second quarter ===
The Eagles got on the board on their next drive, with Jaworski completing passes to tight end John Spagnola and running back Wilbert Montgomery for gains of 22 and 25 yards, respectively, on a 61-yard drive that ended with a 30-yard field goal by kicker Tony Franklin, cutting their deficit to 14–3 five minutes into the second quarter. After another exchange of punts, with just over four minutes left in the half, the Raiders reached the Eagles 27-yard line, which included an 18-yard reception by Branch, only to have kicker Chris Bahr miss a 45-yard field goal. The Eagles then drove 62 yards to Oakland's 11-yard line, aided by two receptions by Carmichael for a total of 43 yards and a 16-yard reception by Montgomery. On third down, Parker got ahead of safety Odis McKinney and was open on a route into the end zone, but Jaworski overthrew him and the pass was incomplete. Then with just 54 seconds left in the half, Franklin attempted a 28-yard field goal, but Raiders linebacker Ted Hendricks extended his 6'7" frame at the line and blocked the kick, maintaining Oakland's 14–3 lead at halftime.

=== Third quarter ===
The Raiders then took the opening kickoff of the second half and scored in six plays. Despite a holding penalty on offensive tackle Henry Lawrence, Plunkett completed a 13-yard pass to King and a 32-yard completion to wide receiver Bob Chandler to move the ball to the Eagles 33-yard line. Then after a 4-yard run by running back Mark van Eeghen, Plunkett threw a 29-yard touchdown pass to Branch, increasing Oakland's lead to 21–3. On the play, the ball was briefly intercepted by Eagles rookie cornerback Roynell Young but Branch immediately ripped the ball out of Young's grasp and held on as the cornerback made a feeble attempt to tackle the wide receiver. The Eagles responded by driving 56 yards to the Raiders 34, aided by two receptions by Carmichael for a total of 37 yards, but on 3rd-and-3, Jaworski threw his second interception of the game to Martin. The Raiders subsequently drove 40 yards on Plunkett's passes to tight end Raymond Chester and Chandler for gains of 16 and 17 yards, respectively. The drive stalled at the Philadelphia 28, forcing Oakland to settle for Bahr's 46-yard field goal, increasing their lead to 24–3.

=== Fourth quarter ===
The Eagles finally managed to score a touchdown that counted early in the fourth quarter to cut their deficit to 24–10. Starting from their own 12-yard line, a 43-yard reception by wide receiver Charlie Smith and a 19-yard catch by Parker sparked an 88-yard, 14-play drive that was capped by Jaworski's 8-yard touchdown pass to tight end Keith Krepfle. But on their ensuing drive, Oakland marched 72 yards in 12 plays, the longest a 23-yard completion from Plunkett to Chandler. The Eagles kept the Raiders out of the end zone, but Bahr kicked a 35-yard field goal, increasing Oakland's lead to 27–10 and capping off the scoring.

The Raiders' defense then dominated the rest the game, forcing two turnovers on the Eagles' last two possessions of the game to prevent any chance of a comeback. On the Eagles' next drive, Jaworski fumbled a snap and defensive end Willie Jones recovered it. Following a Raiders punt, Martin recorded a Super Bowl record third interception, and the Raiders reached the Eagles 19 to run out the clock and win the game.

Cliff Branch's two touchdowns tied a Super Bowl record. Only Max McGee in Super Bowl I and John Stallworth in Super Bowl XIII caught two touchdowns prior to Branch. Jaworski finished the game with more completions (18) and yards (291) than Plunkett but completed just 18 of 38 attempts and was intercepted 3 times. Van Eeghen was the top rusher of the game with 75 yards. King was the top receiver with 93 yards and a touchdown off of just 2 receptions. Eagles running back Wilbert Montgomery led Philadelphia in rushing and receiving with 44 rushing yards and 6 receptions for 91 yards. The Eagles' loss came hours after former head coach Joe Kuharich had died.

After the game, the expected heated confrontation between Rozelle and Davis was actually very civil. As Rozelle presented the Lombardi Trophy to Davis, he praised Plunkett, head coach Tom Flores, the players, and the entire Raiders organization for being the first wild card team to win the Super Bowl. Davis thanked Rozelle, then proceeded to also praise the team.

Oakland became only the second wild card team to make it to the Super Bowl and the first to come away victorious. The Super Bowl IV champion Kansas City Chiefs are often thought of as a "wild-card team," but they were not; during 1969, the season before the 1970 AFL-NFL Merger, the second-place finishers in both divisions of the American Football League qualified for the playoffs. Flores became the first person to be a member of a Super Bowl winning team as a player and head coach. He was a member of the Chiefs in Super Bowl IV but did not play in the game.

Following the March 11, 2023 death of Bud Grant, this is the earliest Super Bowl where both teams' head coaches are still living.

=== Box score ===
Super Bowl XV: Oakland Raiders 27, Philadelphia Eagles 10

Quarter	1	2	3	4	Total
Raiders (AFC)	14	0	10	3	27
Eagles (NFC)	0	3	0	7	10

at Louisiana Superdome, New Orleans, Louisiana

- Date: January 25, 1981
- Game time: 5:16 p.m. CST
- Game weather: 70 °F (21 °C), played indoors, domed stadium

Scoring summary

Quarter	Time	Drive			Team	Scoring information	Score	
Quarter	Time	Plays	Yards	TOP	Team	Scoring information	OAK	PHI
1	8:56	7	30	4:16	OAK	Cliff Branch 2-yard touchdown reception from Jim Plunkett, Chris Bahr kick good	7	0
1	:09	3	86	:57	OAK	Kenny King 80-yard touchdown reception from Plunkett, Bahr kick good	14	0
2	10:28	8	61	4:41	PHI	30-yard field goal by Tony Franklin	14	3
3	12:24	5	76	2:36	OAK	Branch 29-yard touchdown reception from Plunkett, Bahr kick good	21	3
3	4:35	7	40	3:45	OAK	46-yard field goal by Bahr	24	3
4	13:59	12	88	5:36	PHI	Keith Krepfle 8-yard touchdown reception from Ron Jaworski, Franklin kick good	24	10
4	8:29	11	72	5:30	OAK	35-yard field goal by Bahr	27	10
"TOP" = time of possession. For other American football terms, see Glossary of American football.							27	10

== Final statistics ==
Sources: NFL.com Super Bowl XV, Super Bowl XV Play Finder Oak, Super Bowl XV Play Finder Phi, Super Bowl XV Play by Play

=== Statistical comparison ===
	Oakland Raiders	Philadelphia Eagles
First downs	17	19
First downs rushing	6	3
First downs passing	10	14
First downs penalty	1	2
Third down efficiency	6/12	5/12
Fourth down efficiency	0/0	1/1
Net yards rushing	117	69
Rushing attempts	34	26
Yards per rush	3.4	2.7
Passing – Completions/attempts	13/21	18/38
Times sacked-total yards	1–1	0–0
Interceptions thrown	0	3
Net yards passing	260	291
Total net yards	377	360
Punt returns-total yards	2–1	3–20
Kickoff returns-total yards	3–48	6–87
Interceptions-total return yards	3–44	0–0
Punts-average yardage	3–42.0	3–36.3
Fumbles-lost	0–0	1–1
Penalties-total yards	5–37	6–57
Time of possession	29:49	30:11
Turnovers	0	4

=== Individual statistics ===
Raiders passing
	C/ATT^{1}	Yds	TD	INT	Rating
Jim Plunkett	13/21	261	3	0	145.0
Raiders rushing
	Car^{2}	Yds	TD	LG^{3}	Yds/Car
Mark Van Eeghen	18	75	0	8	4.17
Kenny King	6	18	0	6	3.00
Derrick Jensen	4	17	0	6	4.25
Jim Plunkett	3	9	0	5	3.00
Arthur Whittington	3	–2	0	0	–0.67
Raiders receiving
	Rec^{4}	Yds	TD	LG^{3}	Target^{5}
Cliff Branch	5	67	2	29	7
Bob Chandler	4	77	0	32	6
Kenny King	2	93	1	80	3
Raymond Chester	2	24	0	16	3
Mark Van Eeghen	0	0	0	0	1
Arthur Whittington	0	0	0	0	1

Eagles passing
	C/ATT^{1}	Yds	TD	INT	Rating
Ron Jaworski	18/38	291	1	3	49.3
Eagles rushing
	Car^{2}	Yds	TD	LG^{3}	Yds/Car
Wilbert Montgomery	16	44	0	8	2.75
Leroy Harris	7	14	0	5	2.00
Louie Giammona	1	7	0	7	7.00
Perry Harrington	1	4	0	4	4.00
Ron Jaworski	1	0	0	0	0.00
Eagles receiving
	Rec^{4}	Yds	TD	LG^{3}	Target^{5}
Wilbert Montgomery	6	91	0	25	10
Harold Carmichael	5	83	0	29	8
Charles A. Smith	2	59	0	43	5
Keith Krepfle	2	16	1	8	3
John Spagnola	1	22	0	22	3
Rodney Parker	1	19	0	19	3
Leroy Harris	1	1	0	1	1
Billy Campfield	0	0	0	0	2

^{1}Completions/attempts ^{2}Carries ^{3}Long gain ^{4}Receptions ^{5}Times targeted

=== Records set ===
The following records were set in Super Bowl XV, according to the official NFL.com boxscore and the Pro-Football-Reference.com game summary.

Player records set
Longest scoring play	80 yards reception	Kenny King (Oakland)
Passing records
Most attempts, game	38	Ron Jaworski (Philadelphia)
Highest passer rating, game	145.0	Jim Plunkett (Oakland)
Longest pass	80 yards (TD)	Jim Plunkett (Oakland)
Receiving records
Longest Reception	80 yards (TD)	Kenny King (Oakland)
Defense
Most interceptions, game	3	Rod Martin (Oakland)
Records tied
Most touchdowns, game	2	Cliff Branch (Oakland)
Most receiving touchdowns, game	2	Cliff Branch (Oakland)
Most completions, game	18	Ron Jaworski (Philadelphia)
Most interceptions, career	3	Rod Martin
Most kickoff returns, game	5	Billy Campfield (Philadelphia)
Most 40-plus yard field goals, game	1	Chris Bahr (Oakland)

- ‡ Sacks have been an official statistic since Super Bowl XVII by the NFL. Sacks are listed as "Tackled Attempting to Pass" in the official NFL box score for Super Bowl XV.

Team records set
Defense
Most yards allowed in a win	360	Raiders
Records tied
Most points, first quarter	14	Oakland
Largest lead, end of first quarter	14 points	Oakland
Fewest turnovers, game	0	Oakland
Fewest rushing touchdowns	0	Raiders; Eagles
Fewest times sacked	0	Eagles

Records set, both team totals
	Total	Raiders	Eagles
Passing, Both Teams
Most passing yards (net)	551	260	291
Fewest times sacked	1	1	0
Punting, Both Teams
Fewest punts, game	6	3	3
Records tied, both team totals
Most points, first quarter	14	14	0
Fewest rushing touchdowns	0	0	0

== Starting lineups ==
Hall of Fame‡

Oakland	Position	Philadelphia
Offense
Cliff Branch‡	WR	Harold Carmichael‡
Art Shell‡	LT	Stan Walters
Gene Upshaw‡	LG	Petey Perot
Dave Dalby	C	Guy Morriss
Mickey Marvin	RG	Woody Peoples
Henry Lawrence	RT	Jerry Sisemore
Raymond Chester	TE	Keith Krepfle
Bob Chandler	WR	Charlie Smith
Jim Plunkett	QB	Ron Jaworski
Mark Van Eeghen	RB	Leroy Harris
Kenny King	RB	Wilbert Montgomery
Defense
John Matuszak	LE	Dennis Harrison
Reggie Kinlaw	MG	Charlie Johnson
Dave Browning	RE	Carl Hairston
Ted Hendricks‡	LLB	John Bunting
Matt Millen	ILB	Bill Bergey
Bob Nelson	ILB	Frank LeMaster
Rod Martin	RLB	Jerry Robinson
Lester Hayes	LCB	Roynell Young
Dwayne O'Steen	RCB	Herm Edwards
Mike Davis	SS	Randy Logan
Burgess Owens	FS	Brenard Wilson

== Officials ==
- Referee: Ben Dreith #12 second Super Bowl (VIII)
- Umpire: Frank Sinkovitz #20 first Super Bowl on field
- Head linesman: Tony Veteri #8 fourth Super Bowl (II, VII, X)
- Line judge: Tom Dooley #10 first Super Bowl
- Back judge: Tom Kelleher #7 fourth Super Bowl (IV, VII, XI)
- Side judge: Dean Look #9 second Super Bowl (XIII)
- Field judge: Fritz Graf #17 third Super Bowl (V, VIII)
- Alternate referee: Dick Jorgensen #6 worked Super Bowl XXIV
- Alternate umpire: John Keck #4 worked Super Bowl XXX

Dooley, Graf, Kelleher and Veteri wore #7 at their respective officiating positions during 1979-81 (except Dooley was promoted to Referee for 1981, wearing #19), but Kelleher had priority on the number for the Super Bowl, due to his seniority. Kelleher and Veteri became the third and fourth officials to work four Super Bowls, joining Jack Fette and Stan Javie.

== Aftermath ==
The Raiders became the first team since the 1968 Green Bay Packers to post a losing record the year after winning the Super Bowl, going 7–9 in 1981. Davis won a lawsuit against the NFL in May 1982 and immediately moved the team to Los Angeles, where they remained for 13 seasons before returning to Oakland in 1995. The Raiders left Oakland again in 2020, relocating to Las Vegas. Super Bowl XV would ultimately be the Raiders' final title in the city of Oakland; they would win Super Bowl XVIII in 1983 during their stint in Los Angeles, before losing Super Bowl XXXVII in 2002 during their second stint in Oakland.

The Eagles returned to the playoffs in 1981, but lost 27–21 to the archrival New York Giants in the NFC wild card game. Philadelphia fell to 3-6 during the strike-shortened 1982 season, the first of six consecutive losing seasons for the club, and Vermeil resigned eight days later, citing burnout. Vermeil returned to coaching in 1997 with the St. Louis Rams and led the club to victory in Super Bowl XXXIV. The Eagles would have numerous good teams and playoff appearances in the first few decades after their XV loss but would not return to a Super Bowl until 2004, when they lost Super Bowl XXXIX to the New England Patriots. They would win their first Super Bowl thirteen years later, defeating the Patriots in Super Bowl LII.

The Eagles won the next three meetings with the Raiders, prevailing in 1986 in overtime at Los Angeles, and 1989 and 1992 at Philadelphia. The Raiders ended their drought in the series in 1995 at Oakland.
