= Rod Martin =

American football player (1954–2026)

- Martin in 1984 after winning Super Bowl XVIII

No. 53
- Position: Linebacker

Personal information
- Born: April 7, 1954; Welch, West Virginia, U.S.
- Died: April 20, 2026 (aged 72)
- Listed height: 6 ft 2 in (1.88 m)
- Listed weight: 218 lb (99 kg)

Career information
- High school: Alexander Hamilton (Los Angeles, California)
- College: Los Angeles City (1973–1974); USC (1975–1976)
- NFL draft: 1977: 12th round, 317th overall pick

Career history
- Oakland / Los Angeles Raiders (1977–1988)

Awards and highlights
- 2× Super Bowl champion (XV, XVIII); First-team All-Pro (1984); Second-team All-Pro (1983); 2× Pro Bowl (1983, 1984); First-team All-Pac-8 (1976)

Career NFL statistics
- Sacks: 33.5
- Safeties: 1
- Interceptions: 14
- Interception yards: 225
- Fumble recoveries: 10
- Defensive touchdowns: 6
- Stats at Pro Football Reference

Roderick Darryl Martin (April 7, 1954 – April 20, 2026) was an American professional football player who was a linebacker in the National Football League (NFL) for the Oakland / Los Angeles Raiders from 1977 to 1988. He is best known for his record three interceptions in Super Bowl XV, which put him on the cover of Sports Illustrated.

== Early life ==
Martin went to Hamilton High School class of 1972; two years ahead of NFL hall of fame quarterback Warren Moon (c/o 1974).

== College career ==
Before his NFL career, Martin played college football for the USC Trojans (USC), where he was a 1976 All-Pac-10 selection. Prior to USC, Martin played at Los Angeles City College.

== Professional career ==
Martin was one of the top linebackers in the NFL during his 12 seasons and made the Pro Bowl twice during his career, in 1983 and 1984. Selected in the twelfth round of the 1977 NFL draft, Martin was initially a 210 lb (95 kg) tweener, undersized for a linebacker and slow for a safety, but eventually bulked up to 220–225. In 1978, his second year, Martin started 8 games, filling in at inside linebacker By 1979, he settled in at the weak-side LB spot, becoming a mainstay on the Raider defense, assisting the Silver & Black to two Super Bowl victories (1980, 1983 seasons) and having an outstanding performance in each one. In Super Bowl XV, Martin recorded a Super Bowl record three interceptions from Philadelphia Eagles quarterback Ron Jaworski, and returned them for 44 yards. His interceptions were a single Super Bowl record and also tied the record for career Super Bowl interceptions, which Chuck Howley's had set playing in two Super Bowls. In Super Bowl XVIII, Martin broke up a third down pass on his own 7-yard line in the second quarter, sacked Joe Theismann once, tackled Washington Redskins Hall of Fame running back John Riggins for no gain on a fourth down and one conversion attempt deep in Raiders territory on the last play of the third quarter, and recovered a fumble in the final period.

In his 12 NFL seasons, Martin recorded 14 interceptions, which he returned for 225 yards and 4 touchdowns, along with 10 fumble recoveries, which he returned for 122 yards and two touchdowns. He also recorded 33 and a half official sacks (sacks were not an official statistic until 1982, Martin's 5th season).

Following the 1983 regular season, Martin was named AFC Defensive Player of the Year by United Press International (UPI).

== Personal life and death ==
Martin returned to work at USC, where he was a programmer and manager of technical and user support services in the Information Sciences Institute. He had two daughters: one played volleyball at Bethune-Cookman University; the other, a softball player who attended Morgan State University.

Martin died on April 20, 2026, at the age of 72.

According to the 2003 Tampa Bay Devil Rays media guide, Al Martin is a nephew of Rod Martin.
