= Lewis Carhart =

American minister

Rev. Lewis Henry Carhart (born Gilboa, New York, September 24, 1833; died February 25, 1922, in Los Angeles) was a Methodist minister in Texas.

He initially ministered in Sherman, Texas, before founding the city of Clarendon in the Texas Panhandle as a dry Christian colony. It was named in honor of his Canadian wife Clara Sully, whose brother Alfred provided the new town with financial support. Clara, however, did not enjoy the settlement and maintained separate residences in Sherman and Dallas.

Carhart went on to pastor in Dallas and Fort Worth before establishing the Quarter Circle Heart Ranch in Donley County. To fund the colony and the ranch, he organized the Clarendon Land Investment and Agency Company and traveled to England to meet with investors. However, a drought and blizzard between 1886 and 1887 produced great losses and Carhart was forced to resign and move from his colony.

After investing his remaining money in a bathhouse in Hot Springs, Arkansas, he settled in Sawtelle, California, where he died in the Union Soldier's Home.

== Sources ==
- H. Allen Anderson: Lewis Henry Carhart from the Handbook of Texas Online. Retrieved 5 February 2010.
