= Super Bowl XVIII =

1984 edition of the Super Bowl

Washington Redskins (1) (NFC) (14–2)	Los Angeles Raiders (1) (AFC) (12–4)
9	38
Head coach: Joe Gibbs	Head coach: Tom Flores
	1	2	3	4	Total
WAS	0	3	6	0	9
LA	7	14	14	3	38
- Date: January 22, 1984
- Kickoff time: 4:45 p.m. EST (UTC-5)
- Stadium: Tampa Stadium; Tampa, Florida
- MVP: Marcus Allen, halfback
- Favorite: Redskins by 3
- Referee: Gene Barth
- Attendance: 72,920

Ceremonies
- National anthem: Barry Manilow
- Coin toss: Bronko Nagurski
- Halftime show: "Salute to Superstars of the Silver Screen"

TV in the United States
- Network: CBS
- Announcers: Pat Summerall and John Madden
- Nielsen ratings: 46.4 (an estimated 77.62 million viewers)
- Market share: 71
- Cost of 30-second commercial: $368,000

Radio in the United States
- Network: CBS Radio
- Announcers: Jack Buck and Hank Stram

Super Bowl XVIII was an American football game played on January 22, 1984, at Tampa Stadium between the National Football Conference (NFC) champion and defending Super Bowl XVII champion Washington Redskins and the American Football Conference (AFC) champion Los Angeles Raiders to determine the National Football League (NFL) champion for the 1983 season. The Raiders defeated the Redskins, 38–9. The Raiders' 38 points scored and 29-point margin of victory broke Super Bowl records; it remains the most points scored by an AFC team in a Super Bowl, later matched by the Kansas City Chiefs in Super Bowl LVII. This is the first time the city of Tampa hosted the Super Bowl and was the AFC's last Super Bowl win until Super Bowl XXXII in 1998, won by the Denver Broncos.

The Redskins entered the game as the defending Super Bowl XVII champions, finished the 1983 regular season with a league-best 14–2 record, led the league in fewest rushing yards allowed, and set a then-NFL record in scoring with 541 points. The Raiders posted a 12–4 regular-season record in 1983, their second in Los Angeles, having moved there from Oakland in May 1982.

The Raiders dominated Super Bowl XVIII outgaining the Redskins in total yards, 385 to 283, and built a 21–3 halftime lead, aided by touchdowns on Derrick Jensen's blocked punt recovery, and Jack Squirek's 5-yard interception return on a screen pass with seven seconds left in the first half. This is also the second out of five Super Bowls where the winning team outscored the losing team in every quarter. Los Angeles' defense also sacked Redskins quarterback Joe Theismann six times and intercepted him twice. Raiders halfback Marcus Allen, who became the third Heisman Trophy winner to be named the Super Bowl MVP, carried the ball 20 times for a then-record total of 191 yards (breaking the previous record of 166 yards set by John Riggins in Super Bowl XVII the year before) and two touchdowns, including a then-record 74-yard run in the third quarter. He also caught 2 passes for 18 yards. Allen was the first running back who was a halfback to be named Most Valuable Player. All previous running backs who won the MVP were fullbacks.

The telecast of the game on CBS was seen by an estimated 77.62 million viewers. The broadcast was notable for airing the famous "1984" television commercial, introducing the Apple Macintosh. The NFL highlight film of this game was the final voiceover work for famous NFL narrator John Facenda.

As of the 2025 season, this is the Raiders' most recent Super Bowl championship, and it was also the only time that a Los Angeles–based team had won the Super Bowl until their then cross-town rival Los Angeles Rams won Super Bowl LVI at SoFi Stadium in Inglewood, California in 2022.

== Background ==
=== Host selection process ===
The NFL awarded Super Bowl XVIII to Tampa on June 3, 1981, at the owners' meetings in Detroit. This was the first time Tampa hosted the game, and it was the first Super Bowl to be played in Florida in a city other than Miami. Tampa Stadium won the rights to host the game in a landslide, earning 24 out of the 26 votes (there were two abstentions). Three other cities submitted bids for XVIII: Pasadena (Rose Bowl), Miami (Orange Bowl), and New Orleans (Superdome). Detroit (Silverdome) and Dallas (Cotton Bowl) also made presentations, but stated they were only interested in bidding for Super Bowl XIX. Detroit, in particular, was a long shot, as they were slated to host Super Bowl XVI in just over six months, and owners were not ready to award them a second game before they finished their first.

Tampa entered the meeting as a heavy favorite to land the game, representing a new market for the Super Bowl. The representatives led by Tampa mayor Bob Martinez and Tampa Bay Buccaneers owner Hugh Culverhouse touted the local hotels, proximity to Walt Disney World, and the availability of luxury boxes at the stadium. They even hired Pat Summerall to narrate their film presentation. They also received praise from the other owners for their fan support. The Buccaneers had joined the league as an expansion team in 1976, but despite starting 0–26, maintained a loyal fanbase. Pasadena received only one vote, owing much to the fact that they were already slated to host XVII. New Orleans fell out of consideration after a lackluster reception five months earlier at XV. Meanwhile, Miami, back in the running, was also voted down, in an apparent effort to continue providing Dolphins owner Joe Robbie with leverage to build a new stadium. With no outstanding options, owners decided to postpone the awarding of XIX until the 1982 meeting.

=== Washington Redskins ===
The Redskins entered the game appearing to be even better than the previous season when they defeated the Miami Dolphins 27–17 in Super Bowl XVII. The Redskins finished the regular season with a 14–2 record, the best in the NFL, and their two losses were only by one point each. In addition, the Redskins set new NFL records with 541 points breaking the previous mark of 513 points set by the 1961 Oilers (since broken by the 1998 Minnesota Vikings, the 2007 and 2012 New England Patriots, 2011 Green Bay Packers, 2011 New Orleans Saints, 2013 Denver Broncos, and 2018 Kansas City Chiefs), and also had a turnover margin of +43 and the top-ranked run defense.

The Redskins had a number of efficient offensive weapons. Quarterback Joe Theismann won the NFL Most Valuable Player Award for being the second rated passer in the league behind Steve Bartkowski, completing 276 out of 459 (60.1 percent) of his passes for 3,714 yards, 29 touchdowns, and only 11 interceptions. He rushed for 234 yards and another touchdown. Washington's main deep threats were wide receivers Charlie Brown (78 receptions, 1,225 yards, and 8 touchdowns) and Art Monk (47 receptions, 746 yards, and 5 touchdowns), with the latter fully healthy after the previous year's injury that caused him to miss the entire postseason. Wide receiver Alvin Garrett, who replaced Monk during that time, emerged as a significant contributor by catching 25 passes for 332 yards. Fullback John Riggins once again was the team's top rusher with 1,347 yards, and set a then-NFL record by scoring the most rushing touchdowns in a season (24). Multi-talented running back Joe Washington recorded 772 rushing yards, while catching 47 passes for 454 yards and 6 touchdowns. Kicker Mark Moseley led the NFL in scoring with 161 points, while Riggins ranked second with 144, making them the first teammates to finish a season as the NFL's top two scorers since 1951. Washington's powerful offensive line, "The Hogs", were led by two Pro Bowlers, guard Russ Grimm and tackle Joe Jacoby.

The Redskins' defense led the league in fewest rushing yards allowed (1,289). Pro Bowl defensive tackle Dave Butz recorded 11.5 sacks and a fumble recovery. On the other side of the line, defensive end Dexter Manley recorded 11 sacks and an interception. Defensive back Mark Murphy led the NFL with 9 interceptions, while the other starters in the secondary, Vernon Dean, Anthony Washington and Ken Coffey, along with rookie cornerback Darrell Green, combined for 13 interceptions. Washington, Coffey and Green filled the void left by the season-long suspension of safety Tony Peters and the season-long holdout by cornerback Jeris White.

=== Los Angeles Raiders ===
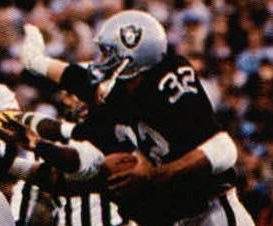
Marcus Allen rushes in Super Bowl XVIII.

The Raiders made it to their fourth Super Bowl in team history after posting a 12–4 regular-season record. Raiders quarterback Jim Plunkett completed 230 out of 379 (60.7 percent) passes resulting in 2,935 yards and 20 touchdowns. His favorite target was tight end Todd Christensen, who led the NFL with 92 receptions for 1,247 yards and 12 touchdowns. Wide receivers Cliff Branch and Malcolm Barnwell combined for 74 receptions, 1,209 yards, and 6 touchdowns. But the largest impact on offense was running back Marcus Allen. In just his second NFL season, Allen led the team in rushing yards (1,014) and total yards from scrimmage (1,604), while ranking second on the team in receptions (68) and touchdowns (11). But Allen was not the only key running back on the team. Kenny King and Frank Hawkins combined for 1,119 total rushing and receiving yards, and 10 touchdowns. Los Angeles also had a powerful special teams attack led by Greg Pruitt, who led the NFL in punt returns (58), and punt return yards, setting a new NFL record with 666. He also added another 604 yards returning kickoffs and rushed for 154 yards and two scores.

On defense, their three-man front was led by Pro Bowl defensive linemen Howie Long (13 sacks, 2 fumble recoveries) and Lyle Alzado, who had 7 sacks, along with rookie Greg Townsend, who recorded 10.5 sacks and a 66-yard fumble return touchdown. The linebacking corps was led by Pro Bowlers Rod Martin and Matt Millen, along with 15-year veteran Ted Hendricks. Martin had six sacks and four interceptions. Cornerbacks Mike Haynes (acquired in a trade from New England) and Lester Hayes were widely considered to be the best cornerback tandem in the NFL. Pro Bowl Safety Vann McElroy recovered 3 fumbles and ranked second in the NFL with 8 interceptions. The Raiders' head coach was Tom Flores.

=== Playoffs ===
The Raiders only allowed a combined total of 24 points in their playoff victories over the Pittsburgh Steelers, 38–10, and the Seattle Seahawks (who had beaten the Raiders twice during the regular season), 30–14. Allen had been particularly effective in the playoffs, gaining a total of 375 combined yards and scoring three touchdowns. The Raiders' defense limited Seahawks running back Curt Warner, who had led the AFC in rushing yards (1,449 yards), to just 26 yards on 11 carries.

Meanwhile, the Redskins crushed the Los Angeles Rams 51–7, and then narrowly defeated the San Francisco 49ers 24–21, with Mark Moseley kicking the game-winning field goal with just 40 seconds left. Mirroring the previous postseason, Riggins was a key contributor, rushing for a combined playoff total of 242 yards and five touchdowns in the two games. In doing so, Riggins extended his NFL record of consecutive playoff games with at least 100 rushing yards to six. Brown also was a key contributor in both playoff wins, recording a combined total of 11 receptions for 308 yards and a touchdown. Washington's defense was just as effective at stopping their postseason opponent's rushing attack as they had been during the regular season, limiting running backs Eric Dickerson and Wendell Tyler to a combined total of 60 rushing yards. Dickerson was the NFL's leading rusher with 1,808 yards and 18 touchdowns during the season, but could only gain 16 yards on 10 carries against the Redskins' defense.

== Broadcasting ==
The game was broadcast in the United States by CBS, the last Super Bowl before ABC was added to the annual broadcasting rotation with the next game the following year (this was added to it as part of a new television contract that began with the 1982 season and a new alternation process that began with the previous game on NBC at the end of that season). The CBS broadcast team consisted of play-by-play announcer Pat Summerall and color commentator John Madden. Hosting pregame coverage for The Super Bowl Today was Brent Musburger, Irv Cross, Phyllis George (in her final assignment for CBS), and Jimmy "The Greek" Snyder. Other contributors included Jim Hill, sports director of CBS station KNXT in Los Angeles (which broadcast the game in its market; WDVM aired the game in the Washington, DC area); Charlsie Cantey; Pat O'Brien; Dick Vermeil; Tom Brookshier; Hank Stram; John Tesh; and CBS News correspondent Charles Osgood. During this game, CBS introduced a new theme and open that would later be used for their college football coverage until it was replaced by the current college football theme introduced on Super Bowl XXI (the next Super Bowl CBS aired at the end of the 1986 season).

CBS Radio had the game nationally with Jack Buck and Hank Stram. Dick Stockton would serve as pregame host for CBS Radio coverage; while Musburger would also contribute halftime commentary in addition to hosting CBS television coverage Locally, Bill King and Rich Marotta called the game on KRLA in Los Angeles; and Frank Herzog, Sam Huff, and Sonny Jurgensen were on WMAL-AM on Washington, D.C.

CBS' Super Bowl lead-out program was the pilot episode of Airwolf.

The game was simulcast in Canada on CTV and in the United Kingdom on Channel 4.

Apple's famous "1984" television commercial, introducing the Macintosh computer and directed by Ridley Scott, ran during a timeout in the third quarter. The advertisement changed how the Super Bowl would be used as a media advertising platform.

The highlight package to Super Bowl XVIII was voiceover artist John Facenda's final project for NFL Films. Facenda died eight months after the game. An expanded version of Black Sunday (the highlight film's title) has appeared on NFL's Greatest Games, containing an additional hour of game footage and more audio play-by-play from both the local KRLA and WMAL radio broadcasts.

== Entertainment ==
The pregame festivities, which paid tribute to George Halas, featured the University of Florida Fightin' Gator Marching Band and the Florida State University Marching Chiefs. After a moment of silence for Halas, singer Barry Manilow performed the national anthem. The coin toss ceremony featured Pro Football Hall of Fame fullback and defensive tackle Bronko Nagurski.

The halftime show was a "Salute to Superstars of Silver Screen."

This was the first Super Bowl to feature the game's logo on the uniforms, but only on the back of the helmets and only Washington wore it. The game logo wouldn't return to the uniforms until 1991's Super Bowl XXV, but this time it was located on the front of the jerseys of both teams. Afterwards, the logo was removed from the jerseys and wouldn't become a regular practice until Super Bowl XXXII in 1998.

== Game summary ==
=== First quarter ===
During the first half, the Raiders scored on offense, defense, and special teams, becoming the first team to score two non-offensive touchdowns in a Super Bowl. After both teams forced punts to start the game, Los Angeles tight end Derrick Jensen blocked Jeff Hayes' punt deep in Washington territory and recovered the ball in the end zone for the first touchdown of the game to give the Raiders a 7–0 lead. On their ensuing drive, the Redskins were forced to punt, but Raiders cornerback Ted Watts unknowingly deflected the ball with his arm during a block, and Redskins safety Greg Williams recovered the ball at the Raiders 42-yard line. However, Washington was only able to advance to the Los Angeles 27-yard line and came away with no points after kicker Mark Moseley missed a 44-yard field goal attempt wide left. After the teams traded punts again, Raiders running back Marcus Allen ran 20 yards in two plays to reach the Redskins 42 before the end of the first quarter.

=== Second quarter ===
However, the Raiders could not go any further than the Washington 39 and were forced to punt again to start the second quarter. During the kick, Los Angeles punter Ray Guy prevented a disaster when he leaped to pull in a high snap one-handed, before punting through the end zone for a touchback. After the Redskins were forced to punt, Raiders quarterback Jim Plunkett completed a 50-yard pass to wide receiver Cliff Branch, advancing the ball to the Redskins' 15-yard line. Branch said that the Raiders took advantage of the tailwind after the teams switched sides. Two plays later, Plunkett threw a 12-yard touchdown pass to Branch, increasing Los Angeles' lead to 14–0. One of the key contributors on the touchdown play was center Dave Dalby. After snapping the ball, Dalby had no one in front of him to block, so he backpedaled into the backfield and spotted linebacker Rich Milot coming at Plunkett from the left side, managing to throw a block against him just in time to prevent a sack and enable Plunkett to throw the ball. Branch became just the fourth player to catch a touchdown pass in two different Super Bowls (after Lynn Swann, John Stallworth, and Butch Johnson).

On their next drive, the Redskins moved the ball 73 yards in 12 plays to the Raiders 7-yard line, with quarterback Joe Theismann completing a 17-yard pass to wide receiver Alvin Garrett on 3rd-and-17 and three passes to tight end Clint Didier for a total of 50 yards. However, linebacker Rod Martin broke up Theismann's third-down pass attempt, forcing Washington to settle for Moseley's 24-yard field goal, cutting their deficit to 14–3. Los Angeles took the ensuing kickoff and drove 41 yards to the Redskins 40-yard line. The drive stalled when Plunkett's third-down pass fell incomplete, but Guy's 27-yard punt pinned Washington back at their own 12-yard line with 12 seconds left in the half. From there, head coach Joe Gibbs had Theismann run a screen play called "Rocket Screen", but Raiders linebacker Jack Squirek intercepted the pass and returned it 5 yards for a touchdown to give Los Angeles a 21–3 halftime lead. The defense was prepared for the play, as Theismann had successfully completed an identical screen pass to running back Joe Washington for a 67-yard gain in their 37–35 victory over the Raiders on October 2. In fact, Los Angeles linebackers coach Charlie Sumner had sent Squirek onto the field as a last-second substitution specifically to cover Washington. "I was mad," said Raiders linebacker Matt Millen, who had to run off the field to avoid a penalty. "I'd called a blitz, and I was cranked up for it, but he told Jack to play the screen and sent him in. I guess Charlie knows what he's doing, huh?"

=== Third quarter ===
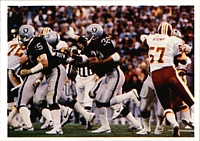
Allen (center) led the Raiders to a championship in Super Bowl XVIII and earned MVP honors as he rushed for a record of 191 yards, including a memorable 74-yard touchdown run.

Washington regrouped in the second half and reached the end zone on their opening drive by marching 70 yards in nine plays. First, Garrett returned the opening kickoff 35 yards from 5 yards deep in the end zone to the Redskins 30-yard line. Then, Theismann completed a 23-yard pass to receiver Charlie Brown to reach the Raiders 47-yard line. Eight plays later, fullback John Riggins finished the drive with a 1-yard touchdown run. (Riggins became the second player to run for touchdowns in back-to-back Super Bowls; he had one in Super Bowl XVII en route to winning that game's Super Bowl MVP award.) Moseley's extra point attempt was blocked by Raiders tight end Don Hasselbeck, but the Redskins had cut the score to 21–9 and were just two touchdowns away from taking the lead.

However, the Raiders completely took over the rest of the game, preventing any chance of a Redskins comeback. On the ensuing drive, Washington cornerback Darrell Green was called for a 38-yard pass interference penalty while trying to cover Los Angeles wide receiver Malcolm Barnwell, setting up Allen's 5-yard touchdown run seven plays later to make the score 28–9 in favor of the Raiders. After the next three possessions resulted in punts, the Redskins had an opportunity to score after cornerback Anthony Washington forced and recovered a fumble from Branch at the Raiders 35. They moved the ball 9 yards in their next three plays, and then faced 4th-and-1. Washington attempted to convert the fourth down with a run by Riggins, just like their successful fourth-down conversion against the Miami Dolphins in the previous Super Bowl, but this time, Riggins was tackled by Martin for no gain, giving the ball back to Los Angeles.

Immediately after the turnover on downs, on the last play of the third quarter, Plunkett handed the ball off to Allen, who started to run left as the play was designed. But after taking an unusually wide turn in that direction (he later confessed, "I messed up."), Allen saw a lot of defenders in front of him and cut back to the middle before taking off for a then-Super Bowl record 74-yard touchdown run, increasing Los Angeles' lead to 35–9 (Allen's run broke the previous record of 58 yards set by Tom Matte in Super Bowl III). This play would later be immortalized by one of the last great lines from narrator John Facenda, who said, "As Washington's hopes faded into the dying daylight, on came Marcus Allen, running with the night."

=== Fourth quarter ===
After both teams exchanged punts to start the fourth quarter, Theismann completed a 60-yard pass to Brown to reach the Los Angeles 12-yard line. Three plays later, a roughing the passer penalty on defensive end Dave Stalls gave Washington a new set of downs at the 8. On the next play, however, safety Mike Davis strip-sacked Theismann, and Martin recovered the ball for Los Angeles at the 31. The Raiders were forced to punt after a three-and-out, but on the third play of the Redskins' ensuing drive, cornerback Mike Haynes intercepted a pass intended for wide receiver Art Monk at the Raiders 42-yard line. A 39-yard run by Allen set up a 21-yard field goal by kicker Chris Bahr to cap off the scoring, 38–9. Los Angeles then forced Washington to punt, and ran out the clock for the win.

Plunkett finished the game with 16 out of 25 pass completions for 172 yards and a touchdown. Theismann threw for more yards than Plunkett (243) but was just 16 out of 35 and was intercepted twice. He was also sacked six times. Branch was the top receiver of the game with six receptions for 94 yards and a touchdown. Guy punted seven times for 299 yards (42.7 average), with 244 net yards (34.8 average) and planted five of his seven punts inside the 20. Martin recorded a sack, a pass deflection, and a fumble recovery. Riggins, who had rushed for over 100 yards in his last six postseason games, was held to 64 yards and a touchdown on 26 carries, with his longest gain being just 8 yards. Brown was their top receiver with three receptions for 93 yards. Tight end Clint Didier caught five passes for 65 yards. Garrett recorded 100 yards on kickoff returns, and one reception for 17 yards. Part of both of Allen's touchdown runs were cutbacks, which, according to New York Daily News writer Larry Fox, burned an overpursuing Redskins defense.

After the game, Redskins general manager Bobby Beathard said that Lester Hayes and Mike Haynes were the difference in the game. Haynes had played out his contract with the Patriots after the 1982 season, and sat out most of the first part of the 1983 season during contract negotiations. He eventually signed with the Raiders, who were forced to give the Patriots draft picks in compensation. He played the final five games of the regular season; his addition gave the Raiders two shutdown corners. According to Beathard, Hayes and Haynes "changed our whole game plan." Hayes had only one tackle, but had the left side of the field covered so effectively that Theismann hardly bothered to throw there. Haynes had two tackles, one interception, and two pass breakups. Although Brown averaged 31 yards on his 3 receptions, Redskin wide receivers combined for only 5 catches, with none in the first half. Another factor was Guy; he punted seven times for an average of 42.7 yards and 34.8 net yards. Five of those punts pinned the Redskins inside their own 20.

This marked the final game in the Hall of Fame career of Raiders linebacker Ted Hendricks, who retired upon earning his fourth Super Bowl ring (three with the Raiders and one with the Baltimore Colts).

The Raiders were the first team to score an offensive, defensive, and special teams touchdown in the same Super Bowl. The Redskins became the second defending champion to lose a Super Bowl (their divisional rivals, the Dallas Cowboys, were the first, losing Super Bowl XIII after winning Super Bowl XII). The Redskins would be joined by the Green Bay Packers in 1998 (won Super Bowl XXXI, lost Super Bowl XXXII), the Seattle Seahawks in 2015 (won Super Bowl XLVIII, lost Super Bowl XLIX), the New England Patriots in 2018 (won Super Bowl LI, lost Super Bowl LII), and the Kansas City Chiefs in 2021 (won Super Bowl LIV, lost Super Bowl LV) and in 2025 (won Super Bowl LVIII, lost Super Bowl LIX).

=== Box score ===
Super Bowl XVIII: Los Angeles Raiders 38, Washington Redskins 9

Quarter	1	2	3	4	Total
Redskins (NFC)	0	3	6	0	9
Raiders (AFC)	7	14	14	3	38

at Tampa Stadium, Tampa, Florida

- Date: January 22, 1984
- Game time: 4:45 p.m. EST
- Game weather: 68 °F (20 °C), sunny

Scoring summary

Quarter	Time	Drive			Team	Scoring information	Score	
Quarter	Time	Plays	Yards	TOP	Team	Scoring information	WAS	LA
1	10:08	—	—	—	LA	Derrick Jensen recovered blocked punt in end zone, Chris Bahr kick good	0	7
2	9:14	3	65	1:34	LA	Cliff Branch 12-yard touchdown reception from Jim Plunkett, Bahr kick good	0	14
2	3:05	13	73	6:09	WAS	24-yard field goal by Mark Moseley	3	14
2	0:07	—	—	—	LA	Interception returned 5 yards for touchdown by Jack Squirek, Bahr kick good	3	21
3	10:52	9	70	4:08	WAS	John Riggins 1-yard touchdown run, Moseley kick no good (blocked)	9	21
3	7:06	8	70	3:46	LA	Marcus Allen 5-yard touchdown run, Bahr kick good	9	28
3	0:00	1	74	0:12	LA	Allen 74-yard touchdown run, Bahr kick good	9	35
4	2:24	8	55	3:55	LA	21-yard field goal by Bahr	9	38
"TOP" = time of possession. For other American football terms, see Glossary of American football.							9	38

== Final statistics ==
Sources: NFL.com Super Bowl XVIII, Super Bowl XVIII Play Finder LA, Super Bowl XVIII Play Finder Was

=== Statistical comparison ===
	Washington Redskins	Los Angeles Raiders
First downs	19	18
First downs rushing	7	8
First downs passing	10	9
First downs penalty	2	1
Third down efficiency	6/17	5/13
Fourth down efficiency	0/1	0/0
Net yards rushing	90	231
Rushing attempts	32	33
Yards per rush	2.8	7.0
Passing – Completions/attempts	16/35	16/25
Times sacked-total yards	6–50	2–18
Interceptions thrown	2	0
Net yards passing	193	154
Total net yards	283	385
Punt returns-total yards	2–35	2–8
Kickoff returns-total yards	7–132	1–17
Interceptions-total return yards	0–0	2–5
Punts-average yardage	8–32.4	7–42.7
Fumbles-lost	1–1	3–2
Penalties-total yards	4–62	7–56
Time of possession	30:38	29:22
Turnovers	3	2

=== Individual statistics ===
Redskins passing
	C/ATT^{1}	Yds	TD	INT	Rating
Joe Theismann	16/35	243	0	2	45.3
Redskins rushing
	Car^{2}	Yds	TD	LG^{3}	Yds/Car
John Riggins	26	64	1	8	2.46
Joe Theismann	3	18	0	8	6.00
Joe Washington	3	8	0	5	2.67
Redskins receiving
	Rec^{4}	Yds	TD	LG^{3}	Target^{5}
Clint Didier	5	65	0	20	7
Charlie Brown	3	93	0	60	7
Joe Washington	3	20	0	10	6
Nick Giaquinto	2	21	0	14	3
Art Monk	1	26	0	26	10
Alvin Garrett	1	17	0	17	1
John Riggins	1	1	0	1	1

Raiders passing
	C/ATT^{1}	Yds	TD	INT	Rating
Jim Plunkett	16/25	172	1	0	97.4
Raiders rushing
	Car^{2}	Yds	TD	LG^{3}	Yds/Car
Marcus Allen	20	191	2	74	9.55
Greg Pruitt	5	17	0	11	3.40
Kenny King	3	12	0	10	4.00
Chester Willis	1	7	0	7	7.00
Frank Hawkins	3	6	0	3	2.00
Jim Plunkett	1	–2	0	–2	–2.00
Raiders receiving
	Rec^{4}	Yds	TD	LG^{3}	Target^{5}
Cliff Branch	6	94	1	50	7
Todd Christensen	4	32	0	14	9
Frank Hawkins	2	20	0	14	3
Marcus Allen	2	18	0	12	2
Kenny King	2	8	0	7	2
Malcolm Barnwell	0	0	0	0	1

^{1}Completions/attempts ^{2}Carries ^{3}Long gain ^{4}Receptions ^{5}Times targeted

=== Records set ===
The following records were set in Super Bowl XVIII, according to the official NFL.com boxscore, the 2016 NFL Record & Fact Book and the Pro-Football-Reference.com game summary.
Some records have to meet NFL minimum number of attempts to be recognized. The minimums are shown (in parentheses).

Player records set
Passing records
Highest passer rating, career, (40 attempts)	122.8	Jim Plunkett (Los Angeles)
Highest completion percentage, career, (40 attempts)	63.0% (29–46)	Jim Plunkett (Los Angeles)
Lowest percentage, passes had intercepted, career, (40 attempts)	0% (0–46)	Jim Plunkett (Los Angeles)
Rushing records
Most yards, game	191	Marcus Allen (Los Angeles)
Longest rushing touchdown	74 yards	Marcus Allen (Los Angeles)
Longest run from scrimmage	74 yards	Marcus Allen (Los Angeles)
Highest average gain, career (20 attempts)	9.6 yards (191–20)	Marcus Allen (Los Angeles)
Combined yardage records ^{†}
Most yards gained, game	209	Marcus Allen (Los Angeles)
Special Teams
Longest punt return	34 yards	Darrell Green (Washington)
Records tied
Most touchdowns, game	2	Marcus Allen (Los Angeles)
Most rushing touchdowns, game	2	Marcus Allen (Los Angeles)
Most receiving touchdowns, career	3	Cliff Branch (Los Angeles)
Most interceptions returned for touchdown, game	1	Jack Squirek (Los Angeles)
Most kickoff returns, game	5	Alvin Garrett (Washington)
Most (one point) extra points, game	5	Chris Bahr (Los Angeles)
Most (one point) extra points, career	8	Chris Bahr (Los Angeles)
Most fair catches, game	3	Greg Pruitt (Los Angeles)

- † This category includes rushing, receiving, interception returns, punt returns, kickoff returns, and fumble returns.

Team records set
Points
Most points, game	38	Raiders
Largest margin of victory	29 points	Raiders
Largest lead, end of 3rd quarter	26 points	Raiders
Rushing
Highest average gain per rush attempt	7.0 (231–33)	Raiders
Kickoff returns
Fewest yards gained, game	17	Raiders
Records tied
Most points scored, first half	21	Raiders
Most points, third quarter	14	Raiders
Most touchdowns, game	5	Raiders
Most (one point) PATs	5	Raiders
Most touchdowns scored by interception return	1	Raiders
Fewest kickoff returns, game	1	Raiders
Fewest passing touchdowns	0	Redskins
Most kickoff returns, game	7	Redskins

Records set, both team totals
	Total	Raiders	Redskins
Points, Both Teams
Most points, third quarter	20	14	6
Punting, Both Teams
Most punts, game	14	7	7

== Starting lineups ==
Hall of Fame‡

Washington	Position	Position	Los Angeles
Offense
Charlie Brown	WR		Cliff Branch‡
Joe Jacoby	LT		Bruce Davis
Russ Grimm‡	LG		Charley Hannah
Jeff Bostic	C		Dave Dalby
Mark May	RG		Mickey Marvin
George Starke	RT		Henry Lawrence
Don Warren	TE		Todd Christensen
Art Monk‡	WR		Malcolm Barnwell
Joe Theismann	QB		Jim Plunkett
John Riggins‡	FB		Kenny King
Rick Walker	TE	RB	Marcus Allen‡
Defense
Todd Liebenstein	LE		Howie Long‡
Dave Butz	LT	NT	Reggie Kinlaw
Darryl Grant	RT	RE	Lyle Alzado
Dexter Manley	RE	LLB	Ted Hendricks‡
Mel Kaufman	ILB		Matt Millen
Neal Olkewicz	MLB	ILB	Bob Nelson
Rich Milot	RLB		Rod Martin
Darrell Green‡	LCB		Lester Hayes
Anthony Washington	RCB		Mike Haynes‡
Ken Coffey	SS		Mike Davis
Mark Murphy	FS		Vann McElroy

== Officials ==
- Referee: Gene Barth #14 first Super Bowl
- Umpire: Gordon Wells #89 first Super Bowl
- Head linesman: Jerry Bergman #17 third Super Bowl (XIII, XVI)
- Line judge: Bob Beeks #59 third Super Bowl (XIV, XVI)
- Back judge: Ben Tompkins #52 second Super Bowl (XIV)
- Side judge: Gil Mace #90 first Super Bowl
- Field judge: Fritz Graf #34 fourth Super Bowl (V, VIII, XV)
- Alternate referee: Jim Tunney #32 worked Super Bowls VI, XI, XII on field
- Alternate umpire: Ed Fiffick #57 did not work Super Bowl on field

For the second consecutive Super Bowl, officials wore a black armband in memory of a recently deceased active official. In Super Bowl XVIII, it was number 5 to honor back judge Raymond Douglas, who died on Christmas Day at his home in Baltimore. Douglas officiated in Super Bowl IX and had been an official since 1968.
