= Anthony Washington (American football) =

American football player (born 1958)

No. 42, 24
- Position: Cornerback

Personal information
- Born: February 4, 1958 (age 68); San Francisco, California, U.S.
- Listed height: 6 ft 1 in (1.85 m)
- Listed weight: 204 lb (93 kg)

Career information
- High school: Fresno (CA)
- College: Fresno State
- NFL draft: 1981: 2nd round, 44th overall pick

Career history
- Pittsburgh Steelers (1981–1982); Washington Redskins (1983–1984); Tampa Bay Buccaneers (1985-1985)

Career NFL statistics
- Interceptions: 8
- Fumble recoveries: 2
- Stats at Pro Football Reference

Anthony Wayne Washington (born February 4, 1958) is an American former professional football player who was a cornerback for the Washington Redskins and Pittsburgh Steelers and Tampa Bay Buccaneers of the National Football League (NFL). He played college football for the Fresno State Bulldogs and was selected in the second round of the 1981 NFL draft. Washington started for the Redskins in Super Bowl XVIII.
