= Woman's Home Missionary Society =

The Woman's Home Missionary Society was founded in Cincinnati, Ohio in 1880, within the Methodist Episcopal Church. Its establishment was influenced by the missionary work of Jennie C. Hartzell, who had previous experience working among African American Refugees in New Orleans. The Society initially focused efforts on revising and improving the living conditions of formerly enslaved African American women in the southern United States. Its original focus included sending Christian women to "destitute" and "degraded" homes and neighbourhoods where they would endeavour to "impart such instruction as can enlighten the minds, reform the habits, and purify the lives of the occupants." The society later expanded tasks to include the establishment of educational institutions and missionary programs in various communities.

Lucy Webb Hayes, president of the Woman's Home Missionary Society from 1880 to 1889.

== Early leadership and organization ==
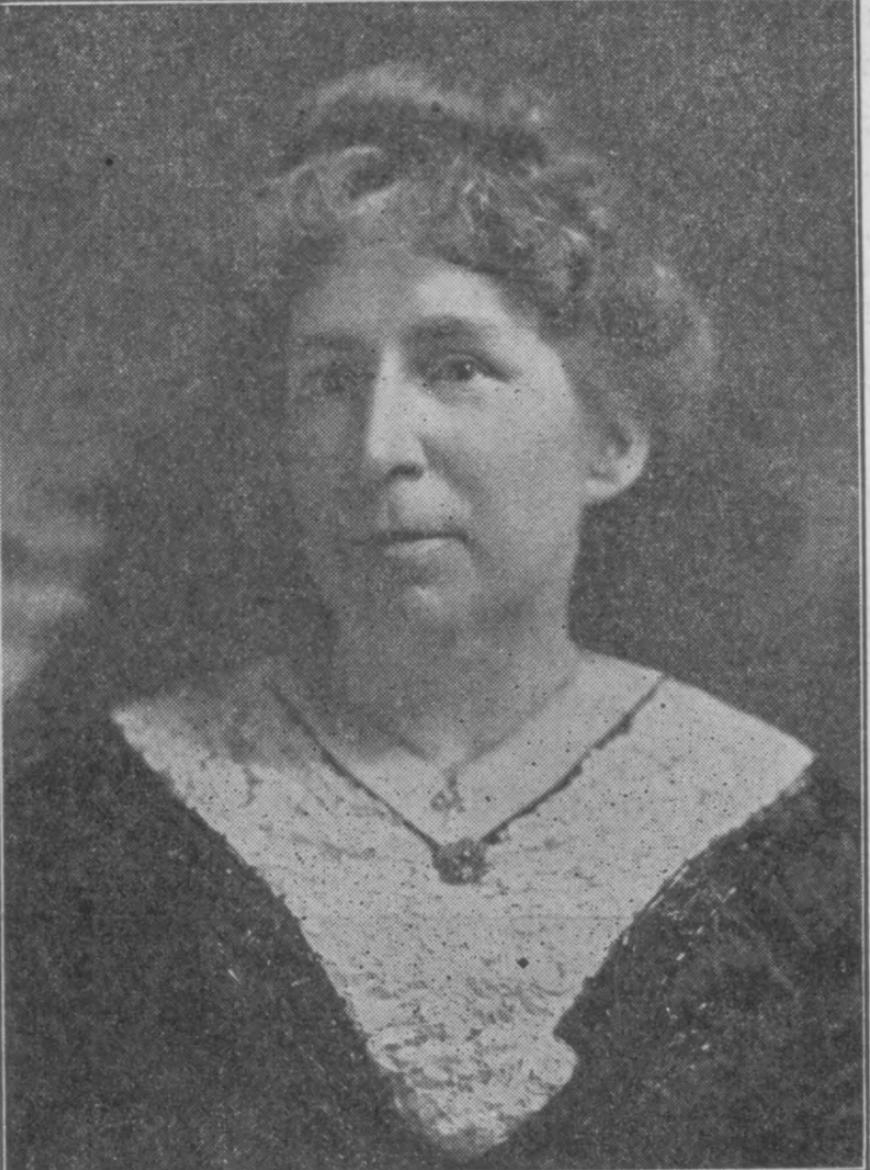
Mary Haven Thirkield, President, 1919

The Society's original founding members invited Lucy Webb Hayes, a long-term member of the Methodist Episcopal Church to serve as the organization's first president in 1880. Initially, Hayes was hesitant to accept the position, but ended up agreeing following correspondence with multiple members of the organization.The establishment of early leadership and connections to prominent figures in the methodist community marked an important development in the Society's growth and influence.

As First Lady of the United States, Hayes was a nationally recognized figure whose involvement brought continued development to the Society. During her presidency, women's rights activist Susan B. Anthony requested that the society send delegates to a meeting of the International Council of Women. However, Hayes declined, maintaining great emphasis on missionary activities, explaining she did not have the authority to make such a decision on behalf of the organization.

The Woman's Home Missionary Society faced minor opposition from the Woman's Foreign Missionary Society, which had been founded and established eleven years before the WHMS, in 1869.

== Educational and missionary activities ==
=== Education of African American women ===
In 1882, the Woman's Home Missionary Society began establishing day schools in the Southern United States, to arrange more educational opportunities for African American children who previously did not have access to public schooling. Two women of the Methodist Church were sent to Savannah, Georgia where they were able to establish a day school, which would eventually contribute to the formation of Boylan-Haven School in Jacksonville, Florida. The society later acquired Thayer Home in Atlanta, Georgiaan institution that provided African American women with training in household management.

The educational tasks that were performed by the Society expanded into industrial and domestic training for African American women. One example was the Adeline M. Smith Industrial Home at Philander Smith University in Little Rock, Arkansas. The home provided instruction to women in domestic skills, which reflected traditional expectations that women's education should focus on their own preparation for marriage and household responsibilities.

In Indiana, the society raised funds for the establishment of Methodist Hospital in Indianapolis from 1907 to 1908, and in 1912, they established an Italian Mission in the same city.

The Society joined with the Women's Missionary Society of the Pacific Coast in 1893 and by 1901, about 500 women and girls had been helped. That year they opened the "Oriental Home for Chinese Women and Girls" at 912 Washington Street in San Francisco's Chinatown, a two-story concrete building with 22 rooms. Unfortunately, this building, along with most of San Francisco Chinatown, was destroyed by the 1906 earthquake and fire.

== Notable people ==
- Clara H. Sully Carhart (1843–1913), Canadian-born American educator and reformer
- Birdie Robertson Johnson (1868–1926), suffragist
- Annette W. Parmelee (1865–1924)
- Martha Van Marter (1839–1931), editor, Woman's Home Missions; writer

== Sources ==
- Pacific Society for the Suppression of Vice Annual Report (1900)
- The San Francisco Examiner, January 10, 1903
