= Clarendon Hotel (disambiguation) =

Clarendon Hotel may be:

- Clarendon Hotel, Christchurch, New Zealand
- Clarendon Hotel, Oxford, England
- Clarendon Hotel, Quebec City, Canada
- Clarendon Hotel, Hammersmith, London
- Clarendon Hotel, Green Cove Springs, Florida, United States, Florida
