= Clarendon Hills (disambiguation) =

Clarendon Hills or Clarendon Hill may refer to:

- Clarendon Hills, Illinois, a village in DuPage County, Illinois, United States
  - Clarendon Hills station, a Metra station in Clarendon Hills, Illinois
- Clarendon Hills (wine), an Australian winery in McLaren Vale, Southern Australia
- Clarendon Hill, a hill in Somerville, Massachusetts, location of Teele Square
