= William S. Lott =

American judge (1918–2009)

Judge William Sunday Lott (1918 – February 11, 2009) served as District Judge of Williamson County, Texas, in the 26th District court as an acting judge for 16 years and is credited with helping to establish Williamson County's tough on crime system. Prior to being elected Judge, he ran a successful law firm. Judge Lott's law career spanned almost seventy years and in the courtroom he was infamous for requiring strict following of procedure and details. He was known by local lawyers as the "Southern Judge", for addressing the court in a slow Texas drawl. He was a longtime member of the Free Masons, and the Georgetown chapter of Rotary.

Judge Lott was born in 1918 in Clarendon, Texas. Lott attended the University of Texas Law School, graduating with a degree in 1940. At the outbreak of World War II, Lott joined the U.S. Army and served as an officer in the SIC, a military intelligence corps. The William S. Lott Juvenile Center in Georgetown, Texas was built and named after him. Today, it helps rehab troubled youth and steer them away from crime. In his tenure as Judge he stuck to the law, never allowing reporters or cameras in his courtroom. He received numerous awards and recognitions during his tenure as Judge.
