= Clarendon, North Carolina =

- Unincorporated community
- Location within North Carolina Location within the United States
- Coordinates: 34°12′37″N 78°50′43″W
- Country: United States
- State: North Carolina
- County: Columbus
- Elevation: 105 ft (32 m)
- Time zone: UTC-5 (Eastern (EST))
  - Summer (DST): UTC-4 (EDT)
- ZIP code: 28432
- Area codes: 910, 472
- GNIS feature ID: 983208

Clarendon is an unincorporated community in Columbus County, North Carolina, United States. The community is located along a railroad and North Carolina Highway 410, 4.6 miles (7.4 km) north-northeast of Tabor City. Clarendon has a post office with ZIP code 28432.
