= Clarendon Independent School District =

School district in Texas, United States

Clarendon Independent School District is a public school district based in Clarendon, Texas, United States.

Located in Donley County, portions of the district extend into Briscoe and Armstrong Counties. In addition to Clarendon, the district also serves the city of Howardwick.

== Schools ==
Clarendon ISD has three campuses -

- Clarendon High School (grades 9-12)
- Clarendon Junior High (grades 6-8)
- Clarendon Elementary (prekindergarten - grade 5)

In 2009, the school district was rated "academically acceptable" by the Texas Education Agency.
