= The Clarendon Academy =

Location
- Frome Road; Trowbridge, Wiltshire, BA14 0DJ; England
- Coordinates: 51.3114°N 2.2178°W

Information
- Type: Academy
- Motto: Aspire to Excellence
- Department for Education URN: 138885 Tables
- Ofsted: Reports
- Chair of Governors: Emma Knight
- Headteacher: Louise Hamilton
- Gender: Mixed
- Age: 11 to 18
- Enrolment: 1085 (March 2026)
- Houses: Aslan, Leo, Nala, Rhea
- Colours: Red, Blue, Yellow, Green
- Website: www.clarendonacademy.com

The Clarendon Academy (formerly The Clarendon College, The Clarendon School and Nelson Haden School) is a mixed secondary school and sixth form located in Trowbridge in the English county of Wiltshire.

== History ==
Nelson Haden Senior Boys' Secondary Modern School and Nelson Haden County Girls' Secondary Modern opened on the site that is now the Clarendon Academy on 16 September 1940. In August 1974 both sets of school buildings became Clarendon School, when Wiltshire County Council implemented the comprehensive education system in Trowbridge.

In 2005 the school became the Clarendon College, a specialist Language College. It converted to academy status on 1 December 2012 and was renamed the Clarendon Academy, with the sponsorship of the Education Fellowship. However, the school continues to coordinate with Wiltshire Council for its admissions. In September 2018, the school changed allegiance to the Acorn Education Trust, which manages 3 other secondary schools, 17 primary schools and 2 nurseries across Wiltshire.

At an Ofsted inspection in November 2017 the school was graded as "Good" overall, achieving this grade in all categories except 16 to 19 study programmes which were assessed as "Requires improvement".

At an Ofsted inspection in June 2023 the school was graded as "Good" overall, achieving this grade in all categories.

== Academics ==
The Clarendon Academy offers GCSEs and BTECs as programmes of study for pupils, while students in the sixth form have the option to study from a range of A-levels and further BTECs.
