= Clarendon School =

Historic structure in Virginia, US

- U.S. National Register of Historic Places
- Virginia Landmarks Register
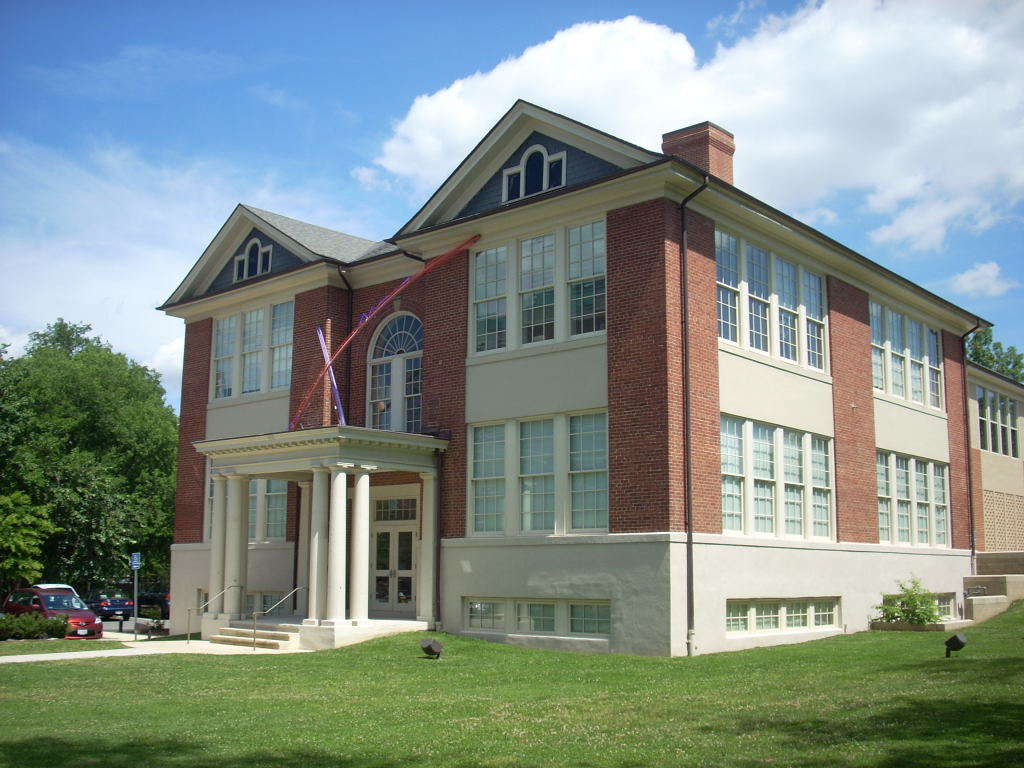
- Clarendon School, now the Arlington Arts Center

- Location within District of Columbia Location within Virginia Location within the United States
- Location: 3550 Wilson Bvd., Arlington County, Virginia, U.S.
- Coordinates: 38°52′54″N 77°6′8″W
- Area: 2 acres (0.81 ha)
- Built: 1910
- Architect: Charles M. Robinson; M.W. Gayle
- Architectural style: Classical Revival
- NRHP reference No.: 99001502
- VLR No.: 000-0453

Significant dates
- Added to NRHP: December 9, 1999
- Designated VLR: September 15, 1999

The Clarendon School is a historic school building located in the Virginia Square neighborhood of Arlington County, Virginia. The structure was erected in 1910 based on a design by noted Virginia architect Charles M. Robinson.

The school was renamed to the Maury School in 1925 to honor Matthew Fontaine Maury (1806-1873), a geographer, and oceanographer known as the “Pathfinder of the Seas.” Born on January 14, 1806, in Fredericksburg, Virginia, Maury joined the United States Navy in 1821 and was promoted to lieutenant in 1836. He served as superintendent of the Navy Department's Depot of Charts and Instruments (the United States Naval Observatory) from 1842 to 1855 and from 1858 to 1861.

When the American Civil War started in 1861, Maury resigned from the United States Navy to accept a commission as a commander in the Confederate States Navy, and later became Secretary of the Navy for the Confederacy. After the Civil War ended, he lived in England. In 1868, he moved to Lexington, Virginia, where he served as a professor of meteorology at the Virginia Military Institute.

The building ceased operating as a school after the 1972–1973 school year. In 1977, the building was converted for use as a studio space for local artists. The Arlington Arts Center, a non-profit organization, has operated the building since that time, offering art classes, educational programs, exhibitions, and studio space.

The Arlington County Board designated the building to be a local historic district on April 7, 1984. The National Park Service listed the building on the National Register of Historic Places on December 9, 1999.

== See also ==
- List of Arlington County Historic Districts
