= Clarendon, Texas =

- City
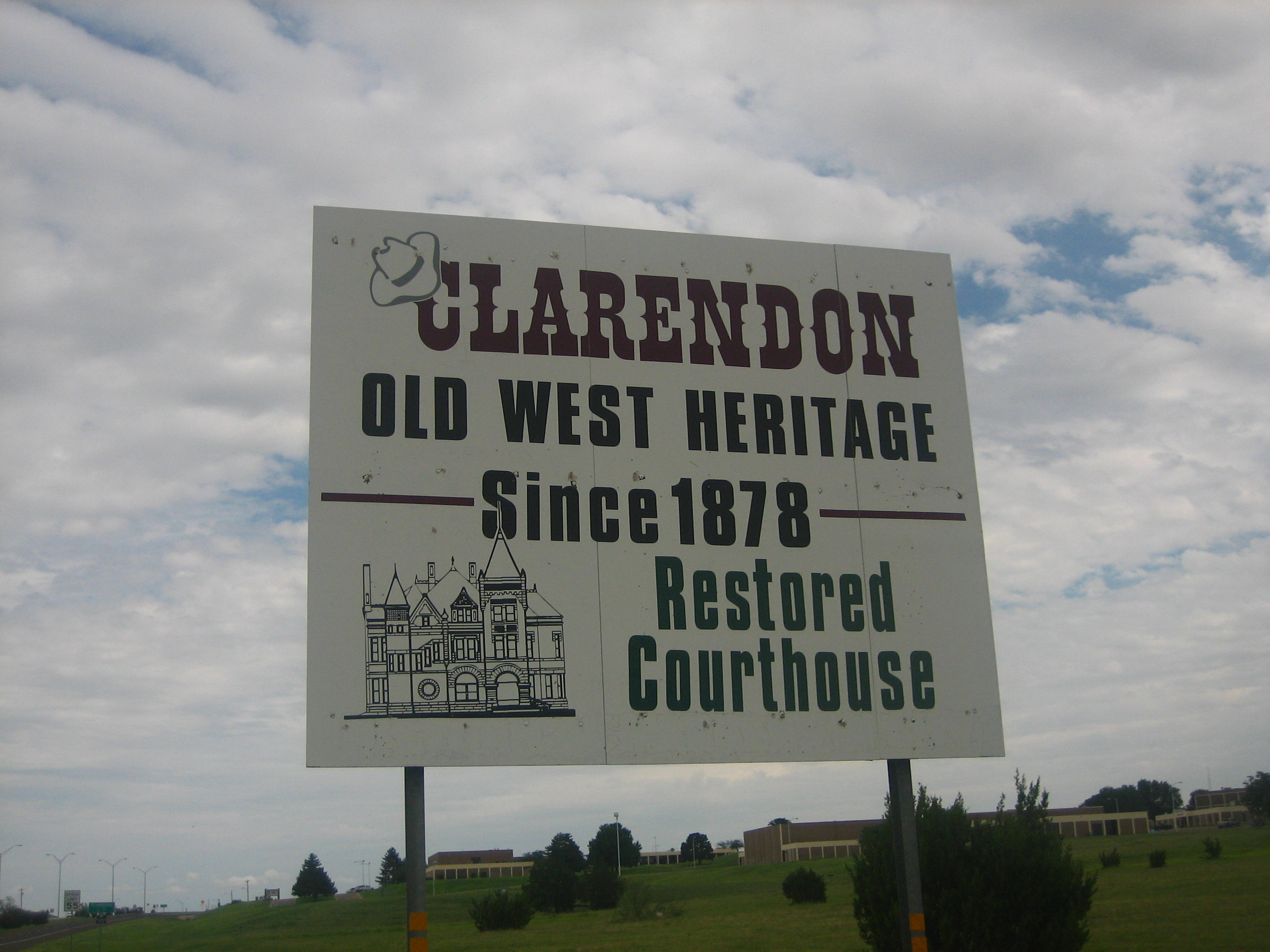
- Clarendon welcome sign on U.S. Highway 287

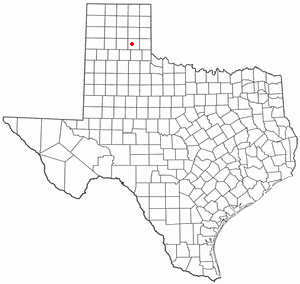
- Location of Clarendon, Texas

- Coordinates: 34°56′12″N 100°53′28″W
- Country: United States
- State: Texas
- County: Donley

Area
  - Total: 3.01 sq mi (7.79 km^{2})
  - Land: 2.90 sq mi (7.52 km^{2})
  - Water: 0.10 sq mi (0.27 km^{2})
- Elevation: 2,743 ft (836 m)

Population (2020)
  - Total: 1,877
  - Density: 646/sq mi (250/km^{2})
- Time zone: UTC−6 (Central (CST))
  - Summer (DST): UTC−5 (CDT)
- ZIP code: 79226
- Area code: 806
- FIPS code: 48-15112
- GNIS feature ID: 2409467
- Website: https://cityofclarendontx.com/

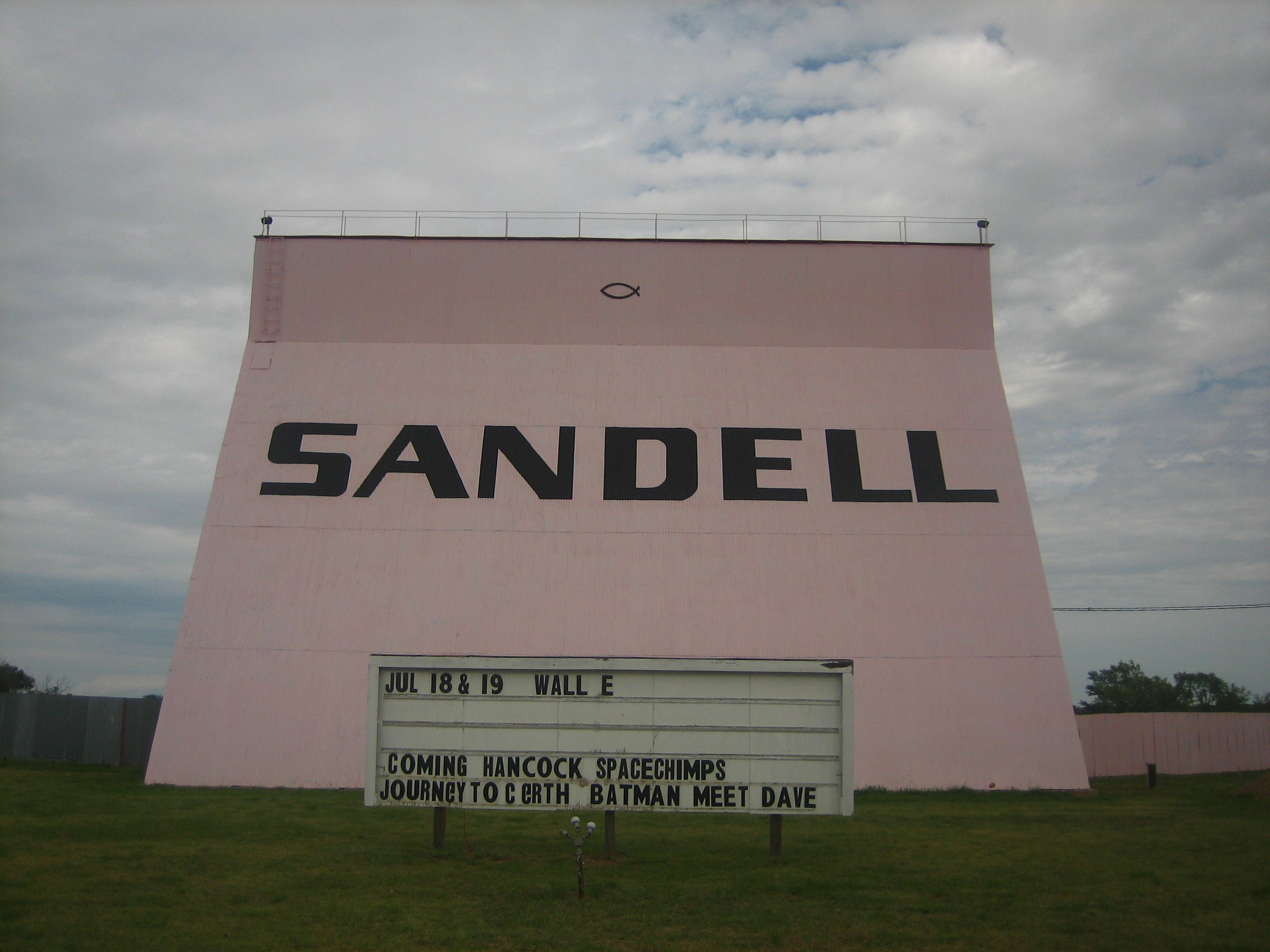
Having been closed in 1984, the Sandell Drive-in theater reopened in August 2002.

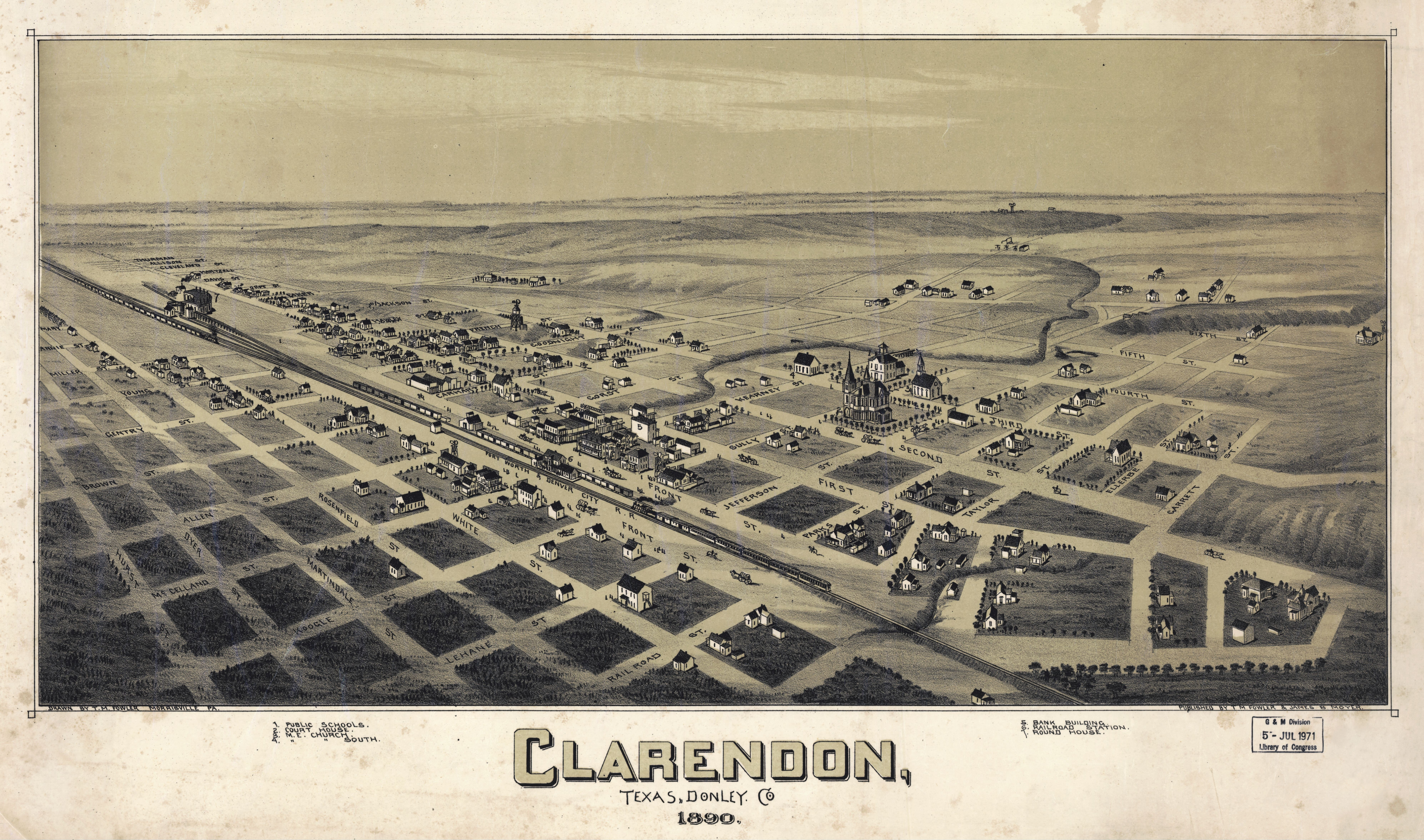
Map of the city in 1890

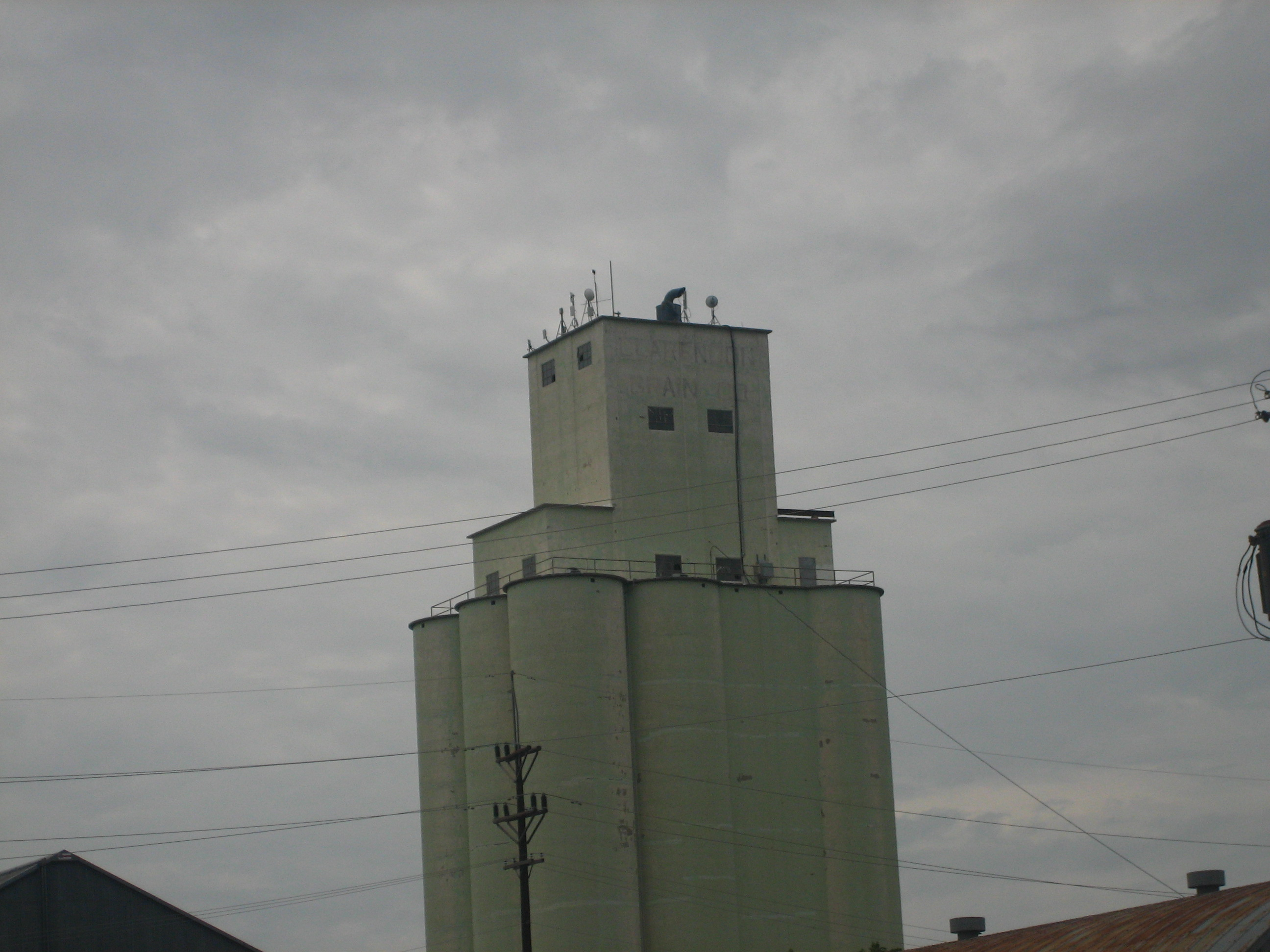
The grain elevator in Clarendon

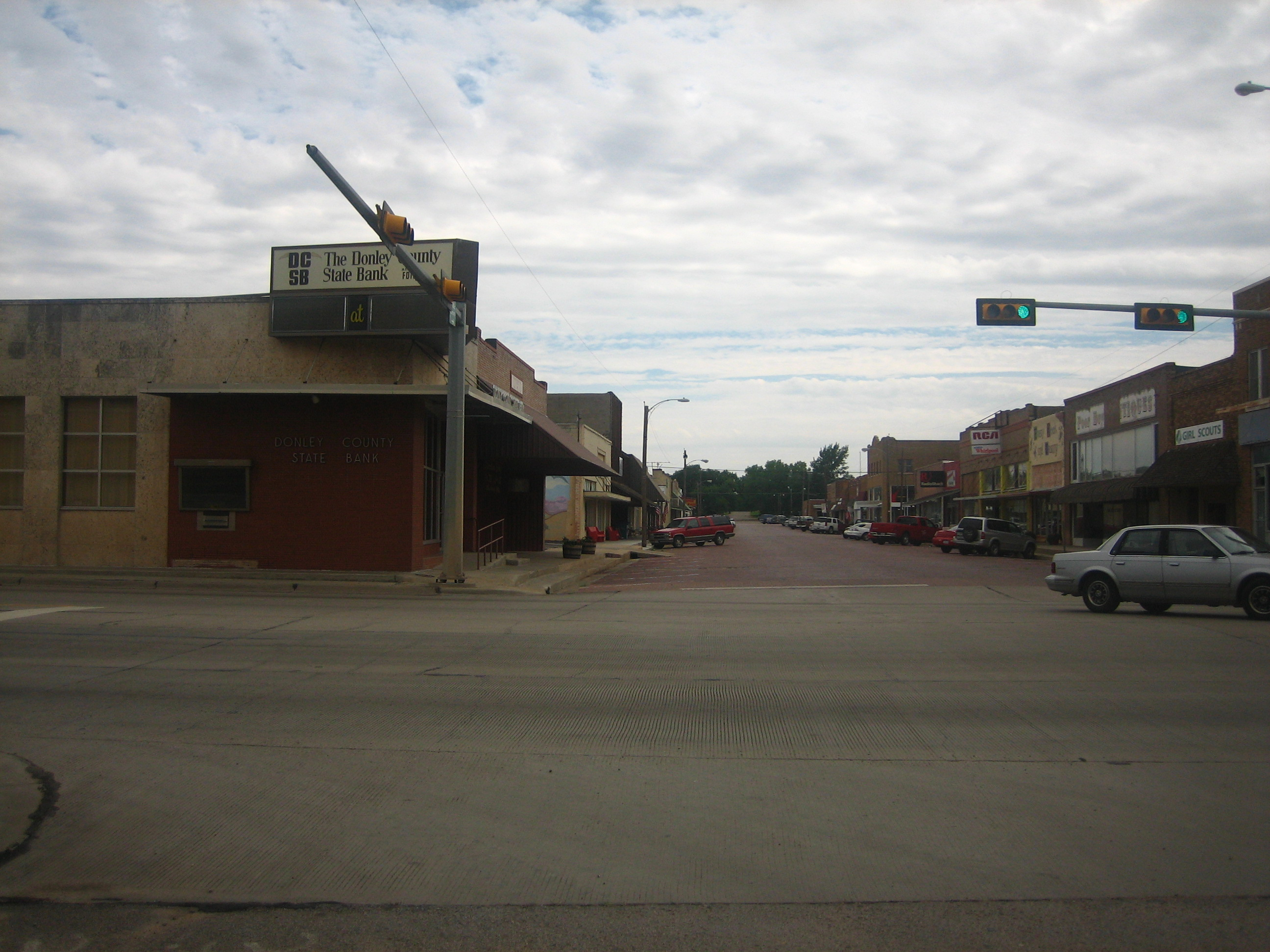
The streets of Clarendon

Clarendon is a city in Donley County, Texas, United States. Its population was 1,877 at the 2020 census. The county seat of Donley County, Clarendon is located on U.S. Highway 287 in the Texas Panhandle, 60 miles (97 km) east of Amarillo.

== History ==
Clarendon, established in 1878, was one of the three original Panhandle settlements, the other two being Mobeetie and Tascosa. Clarendon was relocated after its original location was bypassed by the Fort Worth and Denver Railway.

The town founder was a Methodist clergyman, L. H. Carhart, who envisioned a "sobriety settlement" in contrast to typical boomtowns of that era. Clarendon acquired the sobriquet "Saints Roost" from local cowboys, hence the unusual name of the Clarendon museum, the Saints' Roost Museum.

The town was hit by two tornadoes simultaneously on March 13, 2021. The first tornado caused minor damage west of town before strengthening and causing EF2 damage on the north side of town. The other tornado damaged several homes and sheds in the town at EF0 strength.

== Geography ==
Clarendon is located southwest of the center of Donley County. U.S. Highway 287 passes through the city, leading west 60 miles (97 km) to Amarillo and southeast 57 miles (92 km) to Childress. Texas State Highway 70 leads north 17 miles (27 km) to Interstate 40 and south 42 miles (68 km) to Turkey.

According to the United States Census Bureau, the city has a total area of 3.0 square miles (7.8 km^{2}), of which 2.9 square miles (7.5 km^{2}) are land and 0.1 square miles (0.3 km^{2}), or 3.49%, is covered by water.

=== Climate ===
Climate data for Clarendon, Texas (1991–2020)
Month	Jan	Feb	Mar	Apr	May	Jun	Jul	Aug	Sep	Oct	Nov	Dec	Year
Mean daily maximum °F (°C)	52.5 (11.4)	56.3 (13.5)	65.0 (18.3)	73.1 (22.8)	81.6 (27.6)	90.2 (32.3)	94.6 (34.8)	93.5 (34.2)	85.6 (29.8)	74.5 (23.6)	62.4 (16.9)	53.3 (11.8)	73.6 (23.1)
Daily mean °F (°C)	38.1 (3.4)	41.5 (5.3)	49.7 (9.8)	58.0 (14.4)	67.5 (19.7)	76.8 (24.9)	80.8 (27.1)	79.5 (26.4)	71.6 (22.0)	59.7 (15.4)	47.8 (8.8)	39.3 (4.1)	59.2 (15.1)
Mean daily minimum °F (°C)	23.8 (−4.6)	26.6 (−3.0)	34.4 (1.3)	42.9 (6.1)	53.3 (11.8)	63.4 (17.4)	67.0 (19.4)	65.4 (18.6)	57.5 (14.2)	45.0 (7.2)	33.3 (0.7)	25.4 (−3.7)	44.8 (7.1)
Average precipitation inches (mm)	0.79 (20)	0.66 (17)	1.35 (34)	2.11 (54)	3.45 (88)	3.03 (77)	2.05 (52)	2.90 (74)	2.42 (61)	2.14 (54)	0.92 (23)	0.84 (21)	22.66 (575)
Average snowfall inches (cm)	0.7 (1.8)	0.8 (2.0)	0.7 (1.8)	0.0 (0.0)	0.0 (0.0)	0.0 (0.0)	0.0 (0.0)	0.0 (0.0)	0.0 (0.0)	0.0 (0.0)	0.5 (1.3)	0.8 (2.0)	3.5 (8.9)
Source: NOAA

== Demographics ==
Historical population
Census	Pop.	Note	%±
1890	949		—
1910	1,946		—
1920	2,456		26.2%
1930	2,756		12.2%
1940	2,431		−11.8%
1950	2,577		6.0%
1960	2,172		−15.7%
1970	1,974		−9.1%
1980	2,220		12.5%
1990	2,067		−6.9%
2000	1,974		−4.5%
2010	2,026		2.6%
2020	1,877		−7.4%
U.S. Decennial Census

=== 2020 census ===
Clarendon racial composition (NH = Non-Hispanic) (Note: Note: the US Census treats Hispanic/Latino as an ethnic category. This table excludes Latinos from the racial categories and assigns them to a separate category. Hispanics/Latinos can be of any race.)
Race	Number	Percentage
White (NH)	1,381	73.57%
Black or African American (NH)	160	8.52%
Native American or Alaska Native (NH)	14	0.75%
Asian (NH)	8	0.43%
Pacific Islander (NH)	1	0.05%
Some Other Race (NH)	4	0.21%
Mixed/Multi-Racial (NH)	86	4.58%
Hispanic or Latino	223	11.88%
Total	1,877	

As of the 2020 census, Clarendon had a population of 1,877, 709 households, and 404 families; the median age was 39.6 years, with 21.8% of residents under the age of 18 and 22.0% 65 years of age or older. For every 100 females there were 98.0 males, and for every 100 females age 18 and over there were 103.2 males age 18 and over.

There were 709 households in Clarendon, of which 30.5% had children under the age of 18 living in them, 45.1% were married-couple households, 17.8% were households with a male householder and no spouse or partner present, and 32.3% were households with a female householder and no spouse or partner present. About 34.0% of all households were made up of individuals and 20.3% had someone living alone who was 65 years of age or older.

There were 875 housing units, of which 19.0% were vacant. Among occupied housing units, 63.5% were owner-occupied and 36.5% were renter-occupied. The homeowner vacancy rate was 4.6% and the rental vacancy rate was 14.2%.

0% of residents lived in urban areas, while 100.0% lived in rural areas.

Racial composition as of the 2020 census
Race	Percent
White	77.1%
Black or African American	8.8%
American Indian and Alaska Native	1.0%
Asian	0.4%
Native Hawaiian and Other Pacific Islander	0.1%
Some other race	3.7%
Two or more races	9.0%
Hispanic or Latino (of any race)	11.9%

=== 2000 census ===
As of the census of 2000, 1,974 people, 768 households, and 489 families resided in the city. The population density was 679 people per sq mi (262/km^{2}). The 929 housing units averaged of 320 per sq mi (123/km^{2}). The racial makeup of the city was 87.49% White, 7.19% African American, 0.76% Native American, 0.15% Asian, 2.99% from other races, and 1.42% from two or more races. Hispanics or Latinos of any race were 6.23% of the population.

Of the 768 households, 28.1% had children under the age of 18 living with them, 50.4% were married couples living together, 10.3% had a female householder with no husband present, and 36.3% were not families. About 34.9% of all households were made up of individuals, and 20.2% had someone living alone who was 65 years of age or older. The average household size was 2.31 and the average family size was 2.97.

In the city, the age distribution was 23.5% under 18, 13.9% from 18 to 24, 21.7% from 25 to 44, 21.0% from 45 to 64, and 19.9% who were 65 or older. The median age was 38 years. For every 100 females, there were 89.4 males. For every 100 females age 18 and over, there were 87.3 males.

The median income for a household in the city was $27,824, and for a family was $37,083. Males had a median income of $25,486 versus $18,882 for females. The per capita income for the city was $15,436. About 11.2% of families and 15.4% of the population were below the poverty line, including 19.0% of those under age 18 and 19.9% of those age 65 or over.

== Education ==
Clarendon is served by the Clarendon Consolidated Independent School District. The school colors are maroon, white, and black. The school mascot is the Bronco.

Clarendon is home to Clarendon College (established 1898), the oldest center of higher education in the Texas Panhandle. It was originally affiliated with the Methodist Church. The college is located off Highway 287 in north Clarendon. The mascot is the bulldog. The colors are green and white.
