= Deaths in January 1988 =

The following is a list of notable deaths in January 1988.

Entries for each day are listed alphabetically by surname. A typical entry lists information in the following sequence:

- Name, age, country of citizenship at birth, subsequent country of citizenship (if applicable), reason for notability, cause of death (if known), and reference.

== January 1988 ==
=== 1 ===
- Peter Brown, 81, Australian rules footballer.
- Margot Bryant, 90, English actress (Coronation Street).
- Albert Decaris, 86, French artist and Olympic gold medalist.
- Marcel Hillaire, 79, German-born American actor (Sabrina, Take the Money and Run).
- Clementine Hunter, 101, American folk artist.
- Anwar Hussain, 62, Indian actor and producer.
- John S. Millis, 84, American president of Western Reserve College, cancer.
- Hiroaki Sato, 55, Japanese Olympic footballer (1956).

=== 2 ===
- Dada Bhagwan, 79, Indian spiritual leader, founded the Akram Vignan movement.
- Bill Crawford-Compton, 72, New Zealand flying ace of the Royal Air Force during the World War II.
- E. B. Ford, 86, British ecological geneticist.
- Jesse Gray, 64, American civil rights leader and politician, member of the New York State Assembly.
- Fritz Heider, 91, Austrian psychologist.
- Yukio Kasahara, 98, Japanese general in the Imperial Japanese Army.
- Varadarajan Mudaliar, 61, Indian crime boss, heart attack.
- Ernie Roche, 57, Canadian NHL player (Montreal Canadiens).
- Lia Zoppelli, 67, Italian actress.

=== 3 ===
- Rose Ausländer, 86, Austro-Hungarian–born German-American poet.
- William Cagney, 82, American actor (Lost in the Stratosphere, Flirting with Danger), brother of James Cagney, heart attack.
- Joie Chitwood, 75, American racecar driver and businessman.
- Sady Courville, 82, American Cajun fiddler.
- John Dopyera, 94, Slovak-born American inventor (resonator guitar).
- Gaston Eyskens, 82, Belgian politician and Prime Minister of Belgium.
- Stanley Fuller, 80, British Olympic sprinter (1932).
- Bill Gibb, 44, Scottish fashion designer, bowel cancer.
- Nando González, 66, Spanish footballer and manager.
- Patrick McGeehan, 80, American actor (Aunt Mary, The Red Skelton Show), cerebral hemorrhage.
- Franz Muxeneder, 67, Austrian actor (The White Horses).
- A. Ross Webster, 84, Canadian politician, member of the House of Commons of Canada (1958–1962).

=== 4 ===
- Ruth Bleier, 64, American neurophysiologist, cancer.
- Leo de Block, 83, Dutch politician.
- Mary Jane Carr, 92, American author (Young Mac of Fort Vancouver).
- Ed Cooke, 77, Australian rules footballer.
- Alice Duncan-Kemp, 86, Australian writer and indigenous rights activist.
- Henfil, 43, Brazilian cartoonist, journalist and writer, AIDS from blood transfusion.
- Charles Phibbs Jones, 81, Irish-born general in the British Army.
- Lily Laskine, 94, French harpist.
- Carl Shipp Marvel, 93, American chemist (Polybenzimidazole).
- Charles Quinby, 88, American Olympic swimmer (1920).
- Jos Roller, 58, Luxembourgian football and Olympian (1952).
- Jane Seitz, 45, German film editor, suicide.
- Chin Sophonpanich, 77, Thai entrepreneur, founded Bangkok Bank and Bangkok Insurance.

=== 5 ===
- Joe Keohane, 69, Irish Gaelic football manager and player (John Mitchels, Kerry).
- "Pistol" Pete Maravich, 40, American basketball player (Atlanta Hawks, New Orleans Jazz), heart failure.
- Harold Matson, 89, American literary agent, founder of Harold Matson Company.
- Go Mishima, 63–64, Japanese homoerotic fetish artist, founder of magazine Sabu, complications from cirrhosis.
- Herbert Waddell, 85, Scottish international rugby union player.

=== 6 ===
- Ralph Buxton, 76, Canadian MLB player (Philadelphia Athletics, New York Yankees).
- Brent Collins, 46, American actor (As the World Turns, Another World), heart attack.
- L. P. Davies, 73, British novelist.
- Arturo De Vecchi, 89, Italian Olympic fencer (1928, 1932).
- Bern Dibner, 90, Ukrainian-born American electrical engineer, industrialist and historian of science and technology.

=== 7 ===
- Michel Auclair, 65, German-born French actor (Funny Face, The Day of the Jackal).
- Zara Cisco Brough, 69, American chief of the Nipmuc Nation, Parkinson's disease.
- Roy Dennis, 82, American college football coach (Occidental College).
- Frieda Fordham, 84, British psychiatric social worker.
- Fred Haefliger, 95, American WW1 US Marines veteran.
- Carlo Hintermann, 64, Italian actor, traffic accident.
- Trevor Howard, 74, English actor (Brief Encounter, The Third Man, Sons and Lovers), cirrhosis of the liver.
- Arthur R. M. Lower, 98, Canadian historian.
- Venko Markovski, 72, Bulgarian and Macedonian writer, poet and Communist politician.
- Liao Mengxing, 83, Chinese political activist, secretary of the Soong Ching-ling.
- La Meri, 88, American dancer and choreographer.
- Michael Mills, 68, English television producer and director (Some Mothers Do 'Ave 'Em).
- Marilyn Schreffler, 42, American voice actress (Olive Oyl), liver cancer.

=== 8 ===
- James Adams, 83, Australian cricketer.
- Vyacheslav Aleksandrov, 20, Soviet Guards Junior Sergeant and squad commander in the Afghanistan war, Mujahideen attack.
- Ray Bauduc, 81, American jazz drummer.
- Gérard Buhr, 59, French film and television actor.
- Jared French, 82, American painter.
- Einar Gjerstad, 90, Swedish archaeologist (Lund University).
- Boyd "Red" Morgan, 72, American NFL footballer (Washington Redskins) and actor (The Amazing Transparent Man).
- Frank Pace, 75, American politician, Secretary of the Army, heart attack.
- Oscar Soetewey, 62, Belgian Olympic middle-distance runner (1952).
- Frank J. Zappala, 89, American politician and lawyer, member of the Pennsylvania House of Representatives, heart failure.

=== 9 ===
- Gregory Ain, 79, American architect.
- Marion Speed Boyd, 87, American district judge (United States District Court for the Western District of Tennessee).
- Florence Eiseman, 88, American fashion designer, emphysema.
- Gombloh, 39, Indonesian singer and songwriter, lung disease.
- Juraj Krnjević, 92, Croatian politician, Deputy Prime Minister of Yugoslavia.
- Thierry Maulnier, 78, French journalist and dramatist.
- Jukichi Uno, 73, Japanese actor.

=== 10 ===
- Edward Matthew Curran, 84, American district judge (United States District Court for the District of Columbia).
- Ronald King, 78, New Zealand rugby union player (West Coast, New Zealand All Blacks).
- Bai T. Moore, 71, Liberian poet and novelist (Murder in the Cassava Patch), heart attack.
- Ed Mullen, 74, American basketball player.
- Hugh A. Robertson, 55, American film director and editor (Midnight Cowboy), cancer.

=== 11 ===
- Pappy Boyington, 75, American combat pilot and U.S. Marine Corps fighter ace during World War II, lung cancer.
- George Ewart Evans, 78, British writer and folklorist.
- David Gaines, 40, American environmentalist, founder of the Mono Lake Committee, car accident.
- N. M. Jorgensen, 78, American college football coach and administrator.
- Robert F. Kennon, 85, American politician and judge, Governor of Louisiana.
- René Leray, 86, French Olympic middle-distance runner (1920).
- Con O'Neill, 75, British diplomat, ambassador to China and Finland.
- Endre Palócz, 76, Hungarian Olympic fencer (1948, 1952).
- Jack Pratt, 81, British-born Canadian NHL player (Boston Bruins).
- Isidor Isaac Rabi, 89, Austro-Hungarian–born American physicist, Nobel laureate in Physics, cancer.
- John J. Williams, 83, American businessman and politician, U.S. Senator (1947–1970), heart and respiratory failure.

=== 12 ===
- Joe Albany, 63, American modern jazz pianist, respiratory failure and cardiac arrest.
- Hiram Bingham IV, 84, American diplomat (U.S. Foreign Service).
- Martin Cecil, 78, Anglo-Canadian peer, Marquess of Exeter (Emissaries of Divine Light).
- Spencer Chan, 95, American actor.
- Suniti Choudhury, 70, Indian nationalist, co-assassin of a British magistrate.
- Giuseppe Insalaco, 46, Italian politician, mayor of Palermo, murdered by the mafia.
- Connie Mulder, 62, South African politician and cabinet minister, cancer.
- Bruno Prevedi, 59, Italian tenor.
- Piero Taruffi, 81, Italian racing driver.
- F. D. Washington, 75, American Pentecostal minister.

=== 13 ===
- Viktors Arājs, 78, Latvian-born Nazi officer, leader of the Arajs Kommando.
- Chiang Ching-kuo, 77, Chinese politician, eldest son of Chiang Kai-shek, President of Taiwan, heart attack.
- Erling Erland, 70, Norwegian politician.
- Donald Healey, 89, English car designer, rally driver and speed record holder, Monte Carlo Rally winner.
- Alfred Jensen, 84, Danish politician.
- Kenneth Marks, 67, British politician, Member of Parliament.
- Richard Mitchell, 74, Grenadian-born Trinidadian cricketer.
- Alfred Easton Poor, 88, American architect (James Madison Memorial Building).
- Jean-Paul Racine, 59, Canadian politician, member of the House of Commons of Canada (1958–1962, 1965–1968).
- Aubrey Sinden, 70, English cricketer.

=== 14 ===
- Walter Assef, 74, Canadian politician and Vaudeville, mayor of Thunder Bay.
- Pietro Chiappini, 72, Italian racing cyclist.
- Vladimir Lavrinenkov, 68, Soviet fighter pilot, Hero of the Soviet Union.
- Jimmy Maelen, 47, American percussionist, leukemia.
- Georgy Malenkov, 86, Soviet politician, Premier of the Soviet Union.
- Ross N. Sterling, 56, American district judge (United States District Court for the Southern District of Texas).
- John Worrall, 76, British RAF officer.

=== 15 ===
- Arthur James Richard Ash, 81, Canadian politician, member of the Legislative Assembly of British Columbia.
- Ingeborg Beling, 83, German ethologist (chronobiology).
- Sathyendra Coomaraswamy, 68–69, Sri Lankan cricketer.
- George Hennessey, 80, American MLB player (St. Louis Browns, Philadelphia Phillies, Chicago Cubs).
- Carl Klose, 96, American Olympic rower (1920).
- Seán MacBride, 83, Irish Republican Army leader and politician, Minister for Foreign Affairs, recipient of Nobel Peace Prize.
- Carlos Rangel, 58, Venezuelan writer, journalist and diplomat, suicide.
- Gibreab Teferi, 65, Ethiopian activist, poet and playwright.
- Maurice K. Temerlin, 64, American psychologist and author, heart attack.

=== 16 ===
- Andrija Artuković, 88, Croatian lawyer and politician, Minister of Interior of Croatia, convicted war criminal.
- Inge Einarsen Bartnes, 76, Norwegian politician.
- Ballard Berkeley, 83, English actor (Fawlty Towers).
- Harlan Hubbard, 88, American artist and writer.
- Lakshmi Kant Jha, 74, Governor of the Reserve Bank of India, kidney failure.
- Bob Keegan, 63, British actor (Z-Cars, The First Lady), lung cancer.
- Dutch Kemner, 88, American MLB player (Cincinnati Reds).
- Adelfo Magallanes, 77, Peruvian Olympic footballer (1936).
- Clem Woltman, 73, American NFL player (Philadelphia Eagles).
- David Young, 80, American Olympic swimmer (1928).

=== 17 ===
- Belle Baranceanu, 85, American artist.
- Leela Mishra, 80, Indian actress (Sholay), heart attack.
- Roy Padilla Sr., 61, Filipino politician, governor of Camarines Norte, assassinated.
- Percy Qoboza, 50, South African journalist, author and critic of the apartheid government, heart attack.
- Skeeter Skelton, 59, American lawman and firearms writer.
- Charlotte Wassef, 75, Egyptian beauty queen, International Pageant of Pulchritude (Miss Universe) winner.
- Edward Weinfeld, 86, American judge of the U.S. District Court, cancer.

=== 18 ===
- Konstantin Andrianov, 77, Soviet Russian sports administrator.
- Gunnar Christensen, 82, Norwegian footballer.
- Chauncey Eskridge, 70, American attorney, attorney for Muhammad Ali and Martin Luther King Jr.
- Al Hall, 72, American jazz bassist.
- József Hátszeghy, 84, Hungarian Olympic fencer (1936, 1948).
- Johnnie Maitland, 73, Australian Olympic sports shooter (1956).
- Jean Mitry, 83, French film theorist, critic and filmmaker.
- Angelo de Mojana di Cologna, 82, Italian Prince and Grand Master of the Sovereign Military Order of Malta, heart attack.
- Denis O'Connor, 80, British Army officer.
- John Rossiter, 74, Australian politician, member of Victorian Legislative Assembly, father of Susan Renouf.
- Renato Traiola, 63, Italian Olympic water polo player (1952).

=== 19 ===
- Amelia Bayntun, 68, English actress (Blitz!, Carry On).
- Bridget Boland, 74, British screenwriter (War and Peace, Gaslight), playwright and novelist.
- Cesare Brandi, 81, Italian art critic and historian.
- Gladys Elphick, 83, Australian founding president of the Council of Aboriginal Women of South Australia.
- Yevgeny Mravinsky, 84, Russian conductor and pianist, heart attack.

=== 20 ===
- Raymond Desonay, 89, Belgian Olympic diver (1920).
- Paul Esser, 74, German actor (Sender Freies Berlin).
- Abdul Ghaffar Khan, 97, Pakistani independence activist, stroke.
- Philippe de Rothschild, 85, French Grand Prix motor racing driver, screenwriter and playwright.
- Dora Stratou, 84–85, Greek actress and choreographer.
- James D. Theberge, 57, American diplomat, ambassador to Nicaragua and Chile, heart attack.
- Robert Miles Todd, 90, American WWI flying ace.

=== 21 ===
- Jørgen Grave, 78, Norwegian politician.
- Vincent Lingiari, 79, Australian Aboriginal rights activist.
- Werner Nachmann, 62, German politician, president of the Central Council of Jews in Germany, heart failure.
- Abraham Sofaer, 91, Burmese-born British actor (Victoria Regina, A Matter of Life and Death), heart failure.
- Zev Vilnay, 87, Moldovan-born Israeli geographer, author and lecturer.

=== 22 ===
- Parker Fennelly, 96, American actor (The Trouble with Harry).
- Nadia Russo, 86, Romanian military aviator during World War II.
- Arnold Tholey, 84, French Olympic boxer (1924).

=== 23 ===
- Bantcho Bantchevsky, 81, Bulgarian-born American singer, suicide.
- Dan Daniel, 73, American politician, member of U.S. House of Representatives (1969–1988), heart attack.
- Johnny Gee, 72, American Major League baseball player (Pittsburgh Pirates).
- Charles Glen King, 91, American biochemist (Vitamin C), heart failure.
- Ann Rork Light, 79, American silent-screen actress, emphysema and lung cancer.
- Vincent McMahon, 70, Australian cricketer.
- Hollingsworth Morse, 77, American television director.
- Harry Sköld, 77, Swedish Olympic rower (1936).

=== 24 ===
- Antônio Amaral Filho, 66, Brazilian Olympic swimmer (1936).
- Lilli Andersen, 73, Danish Olympic swimmer (1932).
- Anthony Courtney, 79, British Royal Navy officer and politician, Member of Parliament.
- Werner Fenchel, 82, German-Danish mathematician (Fenchel's duality theorem).
- Lorenzo Greene, 88, American historian of black history.
- Trygve Nagell, 92, Norwegian mathematician (Diophantine equations).

=== 25 ===
- Jurgis Baltrušaitis, 84, Lithuanian art historian and art critic.
- Steve Chomyszak, 43, American AFL and NFL footballer (Cincinnati Bengals), pancreatic cancer.
- Carlos Mauro Hoyos, 48, Colombian jurist and politician, Inspector General of Colombia, assassinated.
- Boris Kulagin, 63, Soviet ice hockey player and coach.
- Abrantes Mendes, 80, Portuguese footballer.
- Colleen Moore, 88, American silent-screen actress (Flaming Youth), cancer.

=== 26 ===
- Raymond Charles Barker, 76, American author, leader of the New Thought spiritual movement, cerebral hemorrhage.
- Pierre Bressinck, 81, Belgian Olympic wrestler (1928).
- Allan Watt Downie, 86, Scottish microbiologist (eradication of smallpox).
- Paul G. Goebel, 86, American NFL footballer (Columbus Panhandles) and politician (mayor of Grand Rapids).
- K. P. Hormis, 70, Indian banker and lawyer (Federal Bank).
- Gershon Iskowitz, 68, Polish-Canadian artist.
- Calum MacLeod, 76, Scottish crofter who built Calum's Road on the Island of Raasay.
- Hugh J. Schonfield, 86, British bible scholar.
- Raymond Williams, 66, Welsh socialist writer and novelist.
- Freddie Wolff, 77, British runner and Olympic gold medalist (1936).

=== 27 ===
- Nils Bergström, 89, Swedish Olympic long-distance runner (1920).
- Massa Makan Diabaté, 49, Malian historian, author and playwright (Le lieutenant de Kouta).
- Kemal Faruki, 77, Turkish Olympic footballer (1928).
- Edward Pawley, 86, American actor of radio, films and Broadway (Two Seconds, Elmer Gantry), heart condition.

=== 28 ===
- Mark L. Booth, 76, American college football coach (Waynesburg).
- Frederick Sumner Brackett, 91, American physicist (spectroscopy).
- Roger De Koven, 80, American actor.
- Klaus Fuchs, 76, German theoretical physicist and Soviet spy.
- Émile Lecuirot, 80, French Olympic rower (1928, 1936).
- Dick Pope Sr., 87, American founder of Cypress Gardens.
- Al Rubeling, 74, American MLB player (Philadelphia Athletics, Pittsburgh Pirates).
- Luska Twyman, 74, American politician, mayor of Glasgow, Kentucky.

=== 29 ===
- Hilda Charlton, 81–82, English-born American professional dancer and spiritual teacher.
- Howard Clewes, 75, English screenwriter and novelist (The Day They Robbed the Bank of England).
- Mihiel Gilormini, 69, Puerto Rican U.S. Air Force officer in World War II.
- Joseph Jaquenoud, 86–87, Swiss Olympic weightlifter (1924, 1928).
- Max Jeffers, 58, Australian rules footballer.
- James Rhyne Killian, 83, American president of MIT, chair of the President's Intelligence Advisory Board.
- Seth Neddermeyer, 80, American physicist, co-discovered the muon, worked on Manhattan Project, Parkinson's disease.
- Rogier van Otterloo, 46, Dutch composer and conductor, mesothelioma.

=== 30 ===
- Eddie Cano, 60, American jazz pianist and composer, heart attack.
- Bum Day, 89, American college footballer (Georgia Bulldogs).
- Wallace Groves, 86, American financier and fraudster, stroke.
- Robert Juday, 87, American Olympic high jumper (1924).
- José Carlos de Lima, 32, Brazilian Olympic cyclist (1980).
- S. K. Wankhede, 73, Indian cricket administrator, politician, Deputy speaker of Bombay Legislative Assembly.

=== 31 ===
- David Ahern, 40, Australian composer and music critic, asthma attack.
- Homer Brightman, 86, American screenwriter (Cinderella, The Three Caballeros).
- Wallace Kyle, 78, Australian Air Chief Marshal, Governor of Western Australia.
- Al Laney, 92, American sportswriter.
- Harold Loeffelmacher, 81, American musician and bandleader.
- Takuji Nakamura, 90, Japanese painter.
- Ron Pavitt, 61, British Olympic high jumper (1948, 1952).
- Agus Subekti, 67, Indonesian admiral, commander of the Indonesian Marine Corps, Vice Governor of West Irian.
- Charley Way, 90, American football player and coach.

=== Unknown date ===
- Ilona Fehér, 86, Hungarian violinist (Hungarian violin school).
- Takeshi Kimura, 76, Japanese screenwriter, throat obstruction.
