= John Facenda =

American broadcaster and sports announcer (1913–1984)

- Publicity photo of Facenda
- Born: August 8, 1913; Portsmouth, Virginia, U.S.
- Died: September 26, 1984 (aged 71); Havertown, Pennsylvania, U.S.
- Other name: The Voice of NFL Films
- Occupations: broadcaster, sports announcer, news anchor, disc jockey, radio personality
- Years active: 1935–1984

John Thomas Ralph Augustine James Facenda (/fə.ˈsɛn.də/ fuh-SEN-duh; August 8, 1913 – September 26, 1984) was an American broadcaster and sports announcer. He was a fixture on Philadelphia radio and television for decades, and achieved national fame as a narrator for NFL Films and Football Follies. Through his work with NFL Films, Facenda was known by many National Football League fans as "The Voice of God".

== Biography ==
=== Early life ===
Facenda had six brothers and six sisters. His father was an immigrant from Italy who went from Portsmouth, Virginia, to help with building the Benjamin Franklin Bridge in Philadelphia while his wife and children remained in Virginia. Facenda attended Roman Catholic High School in Center City, Philadelphia and then later Villanova University but dropped out.

=== Radio and television work ===
In 1948, Facenda became an anchorman at WCAU-TV (which was then Philadelphia's CBS television affiliate), a role that he held until 1973. While there, he began the station's 11 p.m. newscasts.

Among Facenda's writers was John Du Bois, a noted newsman with the Philadelphia Bulletin and County Press.

=== NFL Films ===
One night in 1965, Facenda went to a local tavern, the RDA Club, which happened to be showing footage produced by NFL Films. He enjoyed the slow-motion game sequences that were already an NFL Films trademark and would later recall:

I started to rhapsodize about how beautiful it was. Ed Sabol, the man who founded NFL Films, happened to be at the bar. He came up to me and asked, 'If I give you a script, could you repeat what you just did?' I said I would try.

Thus began Facenda's association with NFL Films, one that would continue until his death. Facenda narrated many highlight films during his career with the company. His dulcet baritone was the perfect match for the highly dramatic nature of the footage he narrated, and earned him the nickname "The Voice of God". Probably one of the best-remembered (and most frequently-quoted) examples of Facenda's NFL Films narration is something he never actually said: "the frozen tundra of Lambeau Field" was a quote sportscaster Chris Berman made up, mimicking Facenda's voice when he said it. Steve Sabol, son of Ed, claimed that "John may have made a game seem more important than it was because he read lines with a dramatic directness." Bob Costas called Facenda's voice "one of the most remarkable instruments in the history of broadcasting."

Facenda was at the pinnacle of his style in 1974's "The Championship Chase" with his recitation of "The Autumn Wind", a football poem written by Steve Sabol, personifying fall weather:

The Autumn wind is a pirate
Blustering in from sea
With a rollicking song he sweeps along
Swaggering boisterously.
His face is weatherbeaten
He wears a hooded sash
With a silver hat about his head
And a bristling black mustache
He growls as he storms the country
A villain big and bold
And the trees all shake and quiver and quake
As he robs them of their gold.
The Autumn wind is a Raider
Pillaging just for fun
He'll knock you 'round and upside down
And laugh when he's conquered and won.

The poem and its accompanying theme music have become an anthem of the Las Vegas Raiders. It is also known as the "Battle Hymn of the Raider Nation".

=== Speaking style ===
To this day, Facenda's speaking style remains the sound most closely linked with NFL Films, and, in some ways, football narration itself. The style is frequently emulated, often in a parodic manner, in contemporary sports news, advertising, and even other sports-themed entertainment (for example, Green Day's music video for the 1999 song "Nice Guys Finish Last"). Similarly, Facenda's voice is so closely associated with the NFL that in July 2006, Facenda's son filed a lawsuit against the NFL, claiming that Facenda's voice was used without permission in an NFL Network program promoting the video game Madden NFL 06.

A room in the internet virtual Professional Football History Museum is called "The Facenda Audio-Visual Room" in Facenda's honor.

Facenda narrated a documentary on Notre Dame Football in 1982 titled "Wake Up the Echoes", one of the few times he put his voice to something that wasn't NFL-related (although it was NFL Films-produced). A few months prior to his death, Facenda narrated the season highlight film for the 1983 Miami Hurricanes, which won the first of the school's five national championships in a 19-season span (1983–2001).

Facenda also provided of the voice of the radio announcer on Gilligan’s Island in the episode "Ship Ahoax," in Season 2, Episode 23.

=== End of anchorman career ===
In the early 1970s, rival WFIL-TV adopted the Action News format based on the news broadcasts heard on Top 40 radio stations and heavily influenced by tabloid newspapers. Brief coverage was given to almost every event happening in town. WCAU's ratings collapsed, and network executives decided that they needed a younger anchor to complement the 60-year-old Facenda. In 1972, 27-year-old Judd Hambrick was brought in as co-anchor. With the first wave of baby boomers entering broadcasting, Facenda decided to step down and make way for the next generation. His last newscast as anchor for WCAU was on March 23, 1973. Many viewers were upset over the loss of Facenda, and his retirement failed to improve ratings. (Part of the decline of WCAU's ratings can also be attributed to rival KYW hiring Jessica Savitch as one of its primary co-anchors in 1972.)

After stepping down as anchor, Facenda continued to work for WCAU in various capacities as a narrator, program director, and host of special reports. He was co-anchor for the station's coverage of Pope John Paul II's visit to Philadelphia in 1979. For many years, he was also the familiar voice of the John Wanamaker Department Store's Christmas Light Show. In 1983, he narrated the NFL Films production of "Frontiers and Beyond", the tour documentary of the rock band Journey. Twelve days before Facenda died, he was presented with the Governor's Award for Lifetime Achievement by the Philadelphia chapter of the National Academy of Television Arts and Sciences. Facenda was named Person of the Year by the Broadcast Pioneers of Philadelphia in 1971 and was inducted into their Hall of Fame in 1992.

== Death ==
Facenda died of cancer on September 26, 1984, at the age of 71.

In 1986, Facenda was posthumously honored with the Ralph Hay Pioneer Award. In 2021, Facenda was honored again by the hall with the Pete Rozelle Radio-Television Award, making him and Joe Browne the only two people to be given two separate auxiliary honors by the hall. As of 2025, neither have yet to be fully inducted in Canton as well.
