= Steeler Nation =

Term for fans of the Pittsburgh Steelers

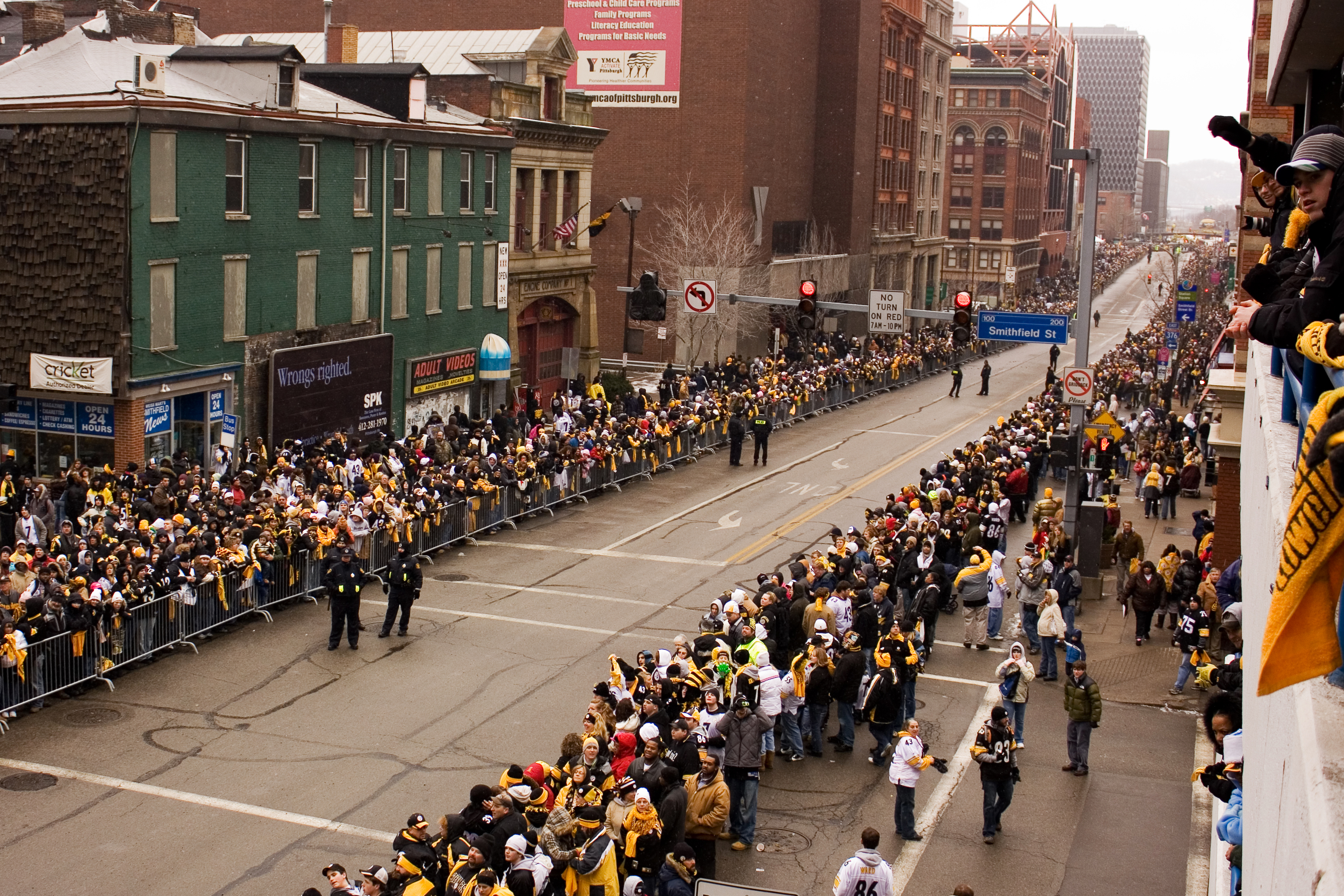
Steelers fans line the Boulevard of the Allies in downtown Pittsburgh for the Super Bowl XLIII victory parade in February 2009

Steeler Nation is an unofficial name for the fan base of the National Football League's Pittsburgh Steelers. The term was coined by NFL Films narrator John Facenda in the team's 1978 highlights film. Steelers Country is often used for the Pittsburgh, Pennsylvania, area where the fan base originates or for areas with a large Steelers fan base.

== History ==
=== Early years ===
The Steelers have had a following in Western Pennsylvania since 1933. That year, Pennsylvania relaxed its blue laws allowing sporting events in the commonwealth on Sundays, paving the way for the Steelers and the Philadelphia Eagles to begin play for the 1933 NFL season. Previously, the state had teams in Pottsville and Frankford, but both had already folded, due to both the Great Depression and their inability to play on Sunday, when most NFL games took place.

Much like the league itself in the early years, the Steelers had to compete with baseball and college football teams in the city, making the team third in the hierarchy to the Pittsburgh Pirates and the Pitt Panthers. Despite the team's early struggles, it had a small but loyal fan base in the city due to the popularity of American football at all levels, dating back to the 1800s, when Pittsburgh hosted the first wholly professional football game in 1895.

=== Rise of the Steelers ===
By the 1950s, the Steelers had gained some popularity in the city and were on par with Pitt, but they were still a distant second behind the Pirates in the city.

In the early 1970s, the Steelers began to rise in popularity. In 1969, there was the hiring of head coach Chuck Noll and the drafting of future Hall of Fame defensive tackle "Mean Joe" Greene. By 1972, the Steelers were a playoff contender and began a sellout streak in Three Rivers Stadium that carried over to Heinz Field and still stands to this day. The team is second to the Washington Commanders for the longest active consecutive sellout streak in league history.

The team's four Super Bowl victories in the 1970s coincided with a recession that struck the United States, and the city in particular, that would lead to the closure of several steel mills in the early 1980s. The team's success was credited with giving people in the city hope and leading to the increased fan base. Due to economic uncertainty in the area, many Steelers fans relocated to other areas but retained their identification with the Steelers as a reflection of their former hometown's steel industrial base.

During the lead up to Super Bowl XIII between the Steelers and the Dallas Cowboys, Phil Musick contrasted the Dallas and Pittsburgh fans by saying that "Dallas is superfan Whistling Ray and a hat that sprays the unsuspecting with water; Pittsburgh is a guy in a gorilla suit who'll stove five of your ribs if you laugh at him."

Jack Lambert said of Steeler Nation during his Hall of Fame induction speech: "How lucky I was to have played for the Pittsburgh Steelers fans. A proud, hard-working people, who loves their football, and their players."

=== Player fan clubs ===
In the 1970s many fans organized fan clubs for their favorite players. Some of these fan clubs included Franco's Italian Army, Frenchy's Foreign Legion, Gerela's Gorillas, Bradshaw's Brigade, Lambert's Lunatics, Dobre Shunka (Good Ham, for Jack Ham), Rocky and the Flying Squirrels, Shell's Bombers, and Russell's Raiders.

== Today ==
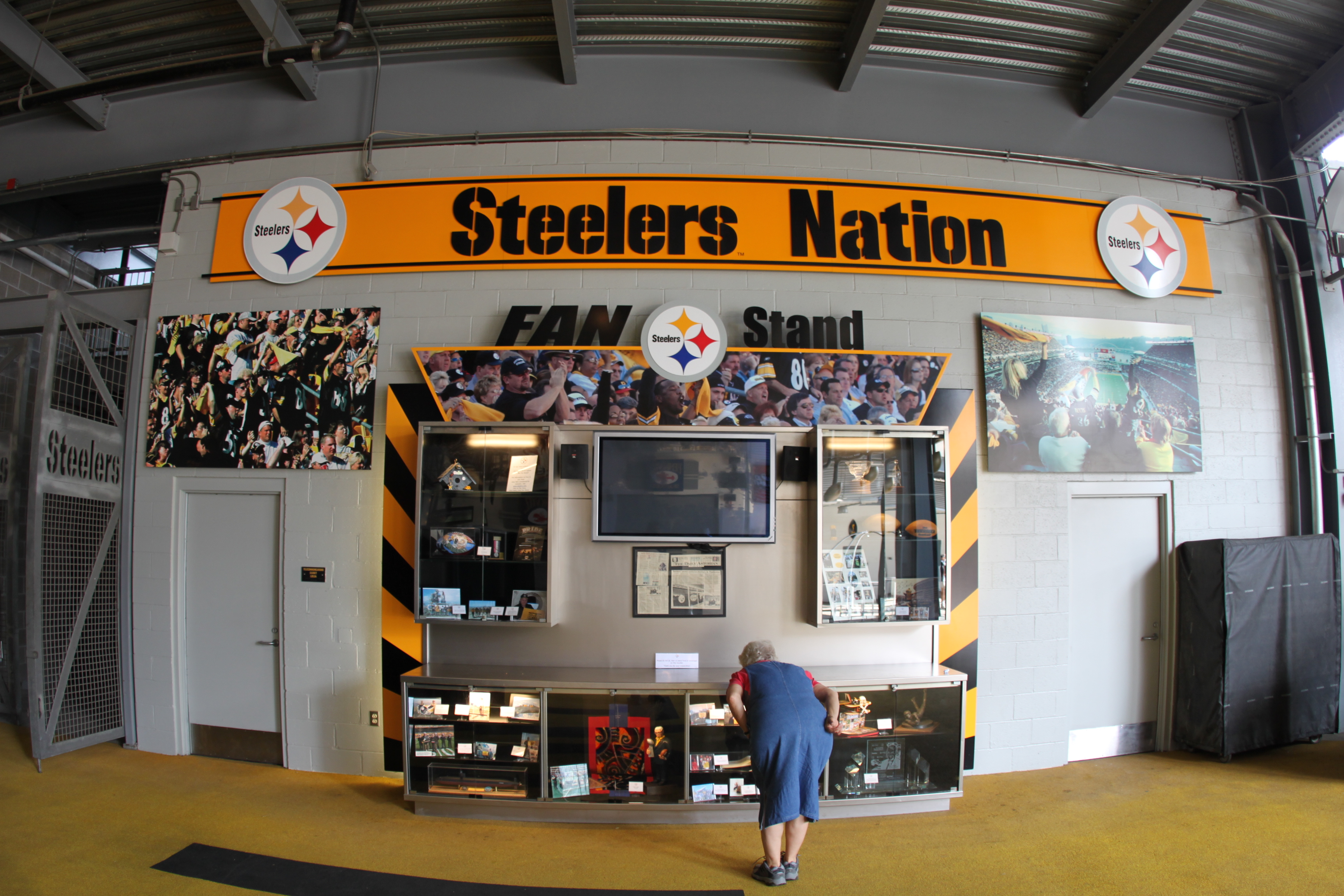
A 2009 "Steelers Nation" display at Heinz Field

Since the 1970s, the Steelers have enjoyed a large fan base and have eclipsed the Pittsburgh Pirates as the most popular sports team in Pittsburgh. While the team's success gained it a large fan base nationally, many consider the collapse of the city's steel industry to have been a cause for the strong fan base in other cities, demonstrated when teams whose home turnout would otherwise require a local blackout on television end up selling out when hosting the Steelers. An instance of the team's large fan base was at Super Bowl XL, where an ESPN.com columnist suggested that Steelers fans outnumbered Seattle Seahawks fans more than 25–1 though that may have to do with the geographical closeness of Ford Field to Pittsburgh.

In November 2007, a study by Turnkey Sports found that the Steelers brand was the strongest in its local market of any team in the NHL, NBA, MLB or NFL.

Many regional communities not officially associated with the "Pittsburgh" market have overwhelming numbers of Steeler fans who regularly flood local stations in both Harrisburg and Erie with requests to show the technically "out of market" Steeler games.

Hines Ward's victory on Dancing With The Stars could also be seen as a sign of the national reach of the Steelers' fan base.

In November 2007, NFL Films president and co-founder Steve Sabol speaking at the team's 75th anniversary gala at the David L. Lawrence Convention Center stated: "The Steelers don't need a mascot. Their fans are their mascot...There were Gerela's Gorillas, Franco's Italian Army, Lambert's Lunatics, people dressed up like a bumble bee. You don't need a mascot when you have fans like that. When we'd go to Pittsburgh to do the game for NFL Films we never brought enough cameras."

Human resources recruiters from the natural gas industry, particularly those in the Marcellus Shale where Pittsburgh is located, began targeting Steeler bars nationwide for possible employees.

== Comparison to other NFL fan bases ==
Attempts at quantifying the loyalty of Steeler Nation relative to other NFL fan bases have shown mixed results.

A 2006 study by the American City Business Journals placed the team's fans 21st out of 32 teams in the league, behind all three of its division rivals in the AFC North. The study found that although the team had been selling out games for years, some fans were not actually attending the games, and Pittsburgh's weekly turnout percentage for home games was 16th in the league. That ranking was down seven slots from the publication's survey conducted in 1997, which ranked Steelers Nation 14th out of 30 teams, partly due to fans leaving nearly 10% of the seats in the stadium empty.

On the other hand, a 2008 study from Forbes.com ranked Steelers fans 8th overall, citing among other things a long season-ticket waiting list. A 2008 article for ESPN.com ranked Steelers fans as the best in the NFL, citing their "unbelievable" sellout streak of 299 consecutive games.

== Response from other teams ==
Anti–Steeler Nation sentiment has grown strong enough that in some cases, front offices for other teams have taken steps to keep Pittsburgh fans out of games in their cities. Instead of being permitted to buy tickets to a Chargers–Steelers game in San Diego, for instance, they were required to pay for tickets to two other games, as well. In other cases, teams refused to sell tickets to fans calling from Pittsburgh's 412 area code, and they encouraged fans who were selling their own tickets to do the same. Steelers President Art Rooney II complained to the NFL about the situation, but his grievance was not acted upon.

== Famous fans ==
- Christina Aguilera, singer
- Kurt Angle, professional wrestler
- Britt Baker, professional wrestler
- Garth Brooks, singer
- Patrick Fabian, actor
- Jim Furyk, professional golfer
- Billy Gardell, actor
- GloRilla, rapper
- John Grisham, author
- Jake Gyllenhaal, actor
- Michael Hayden, former CIA director and longtime NSA director
- Reggie Jackson, former Major League Baseball player
- Jimmie Johnson, NASCAR driver
- January Jones, actress
- Michael Keaton, actor
- Toby Keith, country singer
- Wiz Khalifa, rapper
- Rush Limbaugh, radio talk show host
- Joe Manganiello, actor
- Kate Mara, actress and great-granddaughter of Steelers founder Art Rooney. Also the great-granddaughter of New York Giants team founder, Tim Mara.
- Rooney Mara, actress and great-granddaughter of Steelers founder Art Rooney. Also the great-granddaughter of New York Giants team founder, Tim Mara.
- Seth Meyers, Saturday Night Live head writer and actor
- Bret Michaels, singer
- Mac Miller, rapper
- Barack Obama, 44th president of the United States (primarily a Chicago Bears fan)
- Elvis Presley, singer, actor
- Burt Reynolds, actor
- Curt Schilling, former MLB pitcher
- Frank Sinatra, singer, Brigadier General in Franco's Italian Army
- Stephen A. Smith, sports television personality
- Snoop Dogg, rapper
- Sharon Stone, actress
- Thomas Joseph Tobin, Bishop of Providence
- Verne Troyer, actor
- Donald Trump, 45th and 47th president of the United States
- Ming-Na Wen, actress
- Hank Williams Jr., singer

== See also ==
- Myron Cope
- Dawg Pound
- Raider Nation
- Red Sox Nation
- Cardinal Nation
- Yankees Universe
