= Dennis Miller =

American comedian and television host (born 1953)

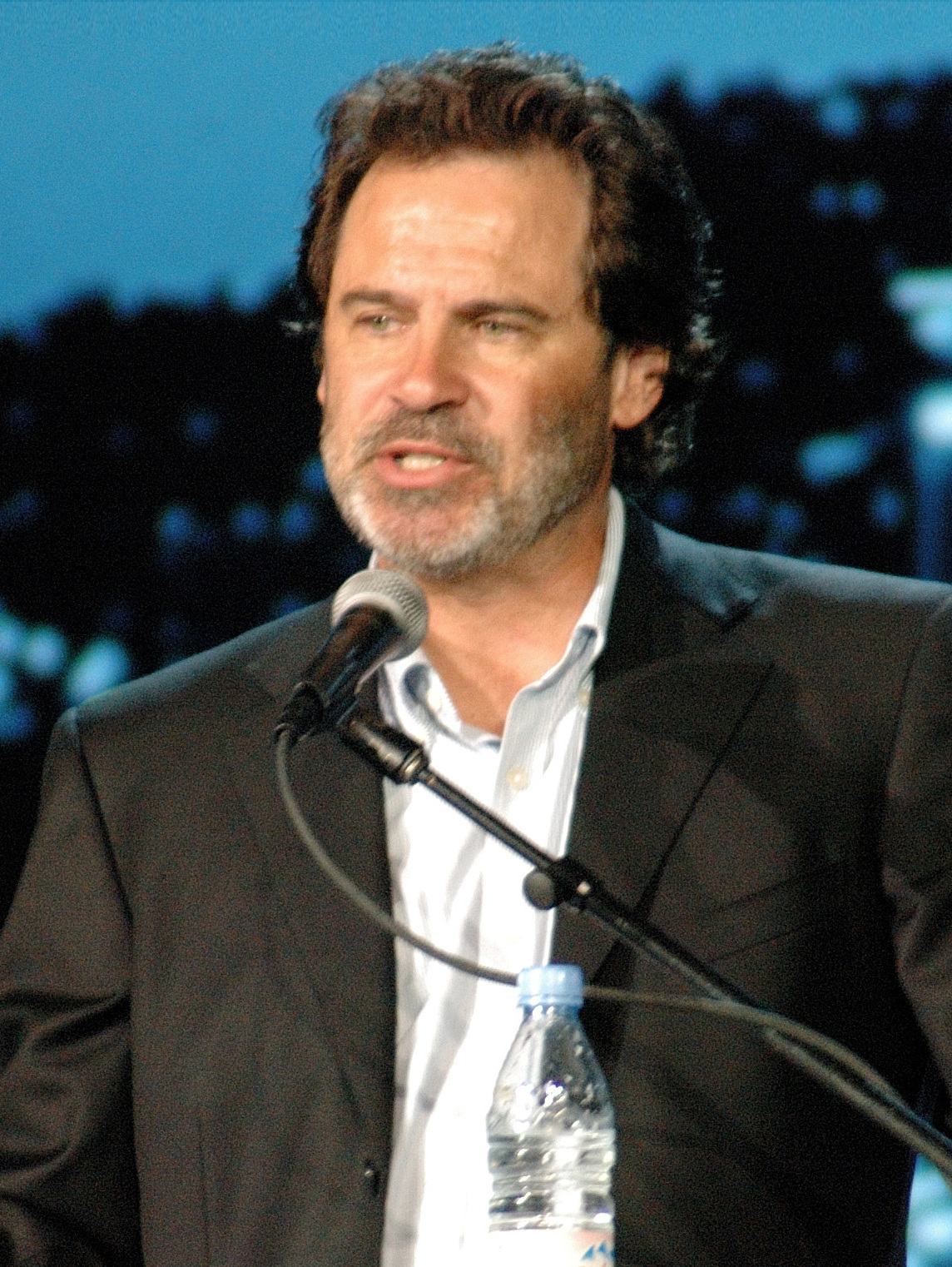
- Miller in 2005
- Born: Dennis Michael Miller; November 3, 1953 (age 73); Pittsburgh, Pennsylvania, U.S.
- Education: Point Park University (BA)
- Spouse: Carolyn (Ali) Espley (m. 1988)
- Children: 2

Comedy career
- Years active: 1978–present
- Medium: Stand-up, television, film, radio
- Genres: Political satire, observational comedy, wit, sarcasm, sketch comedy
- Subjects: American politics, culture, conservatism, libertarianism, human sexuality, pop culture, current events

Dennis Michael Miller (born November 3, 1953) is an American political commentator, stand-up comedian, talk show host, writer, actor and former sportscaster.

Miller was a cast member on the NBC sketch comedy series Saturday Night Live from 1985 to 1991, and he subsequently hosted a string of his own talk shows on HBO, CNBC, and also in syndication. From 2007 to 2015, Miller hosted a daily, three-hour, self-titled talk radio program, nationally syndicated by Westwood One. On March 9, 2020, Dennis Miller + One show, launched on RT America. It ran twice weekly and featured celebrity interviews.

In 2004, Miller was listed as 21st on Comedy Central's 100 greatest stand-up comedians of all time. He was ranked as the best host of SNL's Weekend Update by Vulture.

== Early life ==
Miller was born in Pittsburgh and grew up in the suburb of Castle Shannon. He is of Scottish descent. Miller's parents separated and he was raised by his mother, Norma who was a dietitian at a Baptist nursing home. Miller is reluctant to speak about his father, usually just saying he "moved on when I was very young." He is the oldest of five children.

Miller attended Saint Anne School, a Catholic elementary school. At St. Anne's, he managed the Catholic Youth Organization basketball team for boys 15–16 years old.

His first inspiration to pursue a comedy career came when as a child he was taken to see comedian Kelly Monteith at a Pittsburgh club. After the show, Monteith was kind enough to answer the young Miller's questions about being a comedian. Two other early influences were Jonathan Winters and Tim Conway.

Miller went to Keystone Oaks High School. At Keystone Oaks, Miller was a member of the Physical Fitness Club, and in his senior year he worked on the Keynote newspaper and served on the student council, but lost his bid for senior class president.

By high school, he had already developed a reputation for humor. Despite this, his actual personality at this time was one that was reserved, lacking self-confidence, and hidden under a layer of comedy. He graduated from high school in 1971 with the intent of studying to become a sports writer.

=== College and odd jobs ===
At Point Park University Miller became a member of Sigma Tau Gamma fraternity. Miller likened his social status at this period as being lower than Booger of Revenge of the Nerds. Miller majored in journalism. In the fall of his senior year at the university, he began writing for the South Hills Record, mixing humor into his sports reporting. When the paper changed its payment structure to pay around an eighth of a penny per column inch, he quit. He graduated from Point Park in 1976 with a degree in journalism. He later reflected, "I'm just not that interested in other people's business and that's a tragic flaw in a journalist."

After college Miller moved through several occupations, including a clerk at Giant Eagle deli, a janitor, a delivery man for a florist, and an ice cream scooper at the Village Dairy. As an ice-cream scooper, Miller recalled that he was twenty-one, five years out of high school, and wearing a paper hat while working alongside teenagers. A spur to quit the ice cream scooping job was when he took the order of the prettiest girl from his high school, which filled him with embarrassment. Miller later said that at the time he feared that if he stayed in such jobs, his life would become a Franz Kafka novella, and it stiffened his resolve to start pursuing a comedy career.

Leaving the ice cream parlor Miller joined the staff at Point Park's Recreation Room, where he was in charge of the bowling alley, video games, and running the air-hockey league. A patron from that time recalled that Miller sat on pool tables telling jokes and honing his comedy to those in the rec room, which was the only place the commuters gathered. Miller and the other patrons closely followed the NFL at the time as it was the "era of the Super Steelers".

== Stand-up ==
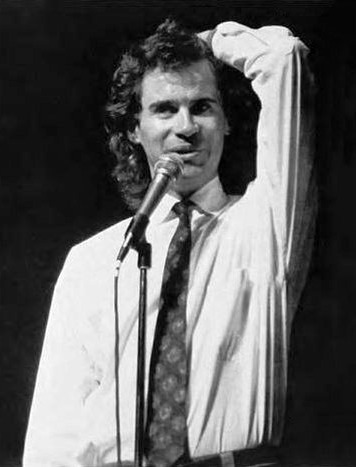
Miller in 1988

In 1979, after seeing a Robin Williams comedy special on HBO, Miller began to pursue his dream of being a stand-up comedian.

=== Pittsburgh ===
In Pittsburgh, Miller began a comedy career by performing at open-mic nights. He backed out of his first two attempts to perform at an open mic due to stage fright and anger with himself over the question of whether the drive to perform was a need for approval from others. When he finally made his début at the Oak's Lounge on Sleepy Hollow Road in Castle Shannon, most of Miller's family was in the audience to cheer him on.

He began appearing onstage at the Oak's Lounge in Castle Shannon while working at the Giant Eagle deli in Kennedy. Miller lived without a car and without much money in the Oakland neighborhood of Pittsburgh, hitching rides or taking buses.

=== New York City ===
He continued to do stand-up in Oakland and at places like Brandy's in the Strip District and the Portfolio on Craig Street, eventually saving up $1,000 which he used to try to fast-track his comedy career by moving to New York City. Once there, Miller had to bribe a landlord to give him a room for $200, then had to pay the security deposit of $250 and the first month's rent of $250. Thus, he spent $700 of his $1,000 savings on his first day in New York, for a sparse, bunker-like room.

While in New York he submitted a joke for a Playboy magazine contest for humor writing that was judged by an all-star panel including Rodney Dangerfield, Bill Cosby, David Brenner, Martin Mull, Art Buchwald, and Buck Henry. Of around 15,000 entries, Miller tied for second and his joke and picture appeared in the June 1979 issue of the magazine. Miller won $500 in Playboy's first annual humor competition with the following joke:

The only difference between group sex and group therapy is that in group therapy you hear about everyone's problems, and in group sex you see them.

— Dennis Miller, Playboy, June 1979

Miller gained more exposure when he tried out for the New York Laff-Off Contest. The contest had 40 slots but 32 of them had already been filled by the top regulars who appeared at the three comedy venues sponsoring the competition. Many of the 350 comedians Miller was up against had hours of crafted material, while he had fine-tuned around ten minutes. To his surprise and delight, Miller earned one of the remaining slots. For the competition itself he appeared at the Improv and received a standing ovation, moving him on to the finals. While he lost the Laff-Off, he was seen by dozens of talent agents, resulting in bookings at colleges and other clubs.

While he was working in New York City, Hustler Magazine listed Miller in a piece called "The 10 Funniest People in America You'll Never See on TV". During this time, Miller supported himself by working day jobs such as bartender and payroll clerk, and by night made the rounds of New York clubs The Comic Strip, The Improvisation, and Catch a Rising Star.

=== Return to Pittsburgh and KDKA-TV ===
After about a year in New York City, he returned to Pittsburgh. It was there that local television station KDKA-TV was shooting a piece for its Evening Magazine and offered him a job at the station. By the end of 1980 Miller was acting as a warm-up in the afternoons for KDKA's Pittsburgh 2Day. He then began starring in humorous segments for the syndicated Evening Magazine. By 1983 he had become the host of Punchline, a Saturday-morning newsmagazine aimed at teenagers. In one episode he interviewed fellow comedian Pat Paulsen. Miller later reflected on this time, saying that "you have to start somewhere," and that he was "just pleased to be in front of a camera."

During performances at comedy clubs in Pittsburgh, Miller befriended Jay Leno and Jerry Seinfeld. In 1984 Leno found Miller an apartment in Los Angeles and he and Seinfeld arranged a debut for Miller at The Improv. Miller resigned from KDKA and moved to Los Angeles to try to further his comedy career.

=== Los Angeles ===
Miller's brothers Rich and Jimmy joined him in Los Angeles, taking up varied jobs around The Improv such as booking shows, acting as a bouncer, and selling tickets. Jimmy became a power talent agent with Gold Miller, and Rich ran RCM Entertainment, booking comedians across the country.

In Los Angeles, Leno was a big influence on Miller, as he was to many up and coming comedians in the area at the time. Young comedians gathered at Leno's home late at night and he offered critiques with humorous, biting wit. Leno also taped television appearances of his group and showed them during such sessions while offering more humorous critiques. Miller later fondly recalled the time, saying it was like "sitting at his knee, querying Yoda".

Miller appeared on Star Search, where he lost out to fellow comedian Sinbad after the two tied on judges' scores; Sinbad won with a higher studio-audience approval rating. Miller made his first appearance on Late Night with David Letterman on June 24, 1985 (other guests were Phil Collins and María Conchita Alonso).

== Saturday Night Live ==
=== Audition ===
In 1985, Miller was discovered by Lorne Michaels at The Comedy Store. Miller subsequently auditioned for SNL in Los Angeles, and did well enough for a second audition at Times Square in New York. About 70 people watched this second audition—this was most of the show's staff along with Lorne Michaels, Paul Simon, and Dan Aykroyd. Miller walked into a well-lit room and was told "Go ahead, you have eight minutes, Dennis."

After the New York audition he went to dinner with Michaels and Jack Nicholson. Miller felt that this was just another aspect of his audition, to see if he could handle himself around famous people, so he "just sat there quietly". Miller later recalled the conclusion of the meeting with Michaels: "He looked at me and goes, 'Would you like to do my newscast?'. And I said, 'Yeah, I would', and he said, 'Well, I'll see you tomorrow'. And then I walked out. And I remember thinking, 'My life has just changed.'"

=== Weekend Update ===
Miller succeeded Christopher Guest as the Weekend Update anchor. The spot was supposed to go to comic Jon Lovitz, but Lovitz was scheduled for other parts on the show and needed the Update segment to do costume changes, so Miller was drafted to read the news. His comedy was apolitical before SNL but politics came easy through opening a newspaper and building a new act around a few headlines. He made his stage persona a bit sardonic, as he noticed people who had done the Weekend Update segment as nice guys quickly lost the role.

Miller began his fictional news reports with "Good evening, and what can I tell ya?" and closed with "Guess what, folks? That's the news, and I... am... outta here!" Fans of SNL became accustomed to his snarky delivery, high-pitched giggle, and frequently primped hair—idiosyncrasies that were spoofed by Dana Carvey, Tom Hanks, and Jimmy Fallon, all of whom have impersonated Miller on the show.

During his time at SNL, Miller released a stand-up comedy album, The Off-White Album in 1988. It drew heavily from the observational and metaphor-driven style he was known for on the show, and showed glimpses of the political humor that influenced his later work. An HBO special, Dennis Miller: Black and White, aired shortly after the release of the CD.

Although Miller spent much of his time on SNL behind the Weekend Update desk, he was included in some sketches. He did a few recurring characters as well as celebrity impersonations including Gary Hart, George Harrison, and Nathaniel Crosby.

=== Leaving SNL ===
It was thought that he would renew his contract with NBC until at least 1993, but Miller left SNL in 1991, after six years, turning over the anchor's chair to Kevin Nealon. Miller was happy with his role on the show, but chose to move on because he had turned 38 and his 18-month-old son Holden made him want to strive for things to "make the boy proud." At the time of his departure, he was (briefly) the longest-running cast member, as he was the first cast member to stay on the show for more than five seasons. However, this record would quickly be surpassed by former cast mates such as Dana Carvey, Phil Hartman, and Kevin Nealon, all of whom stayed on the show a few more years (with Nealon getting said record with his departure in 1995, and holding the record until the end of the 1990s).

Miller soon had a late-night talk show in development (The Dennis Miller Show), and it was believed that fans of Letterman would naturally be interested in Miller's show and prefer that over Leno's in that time slot. He told an interviewer, "I had a great gig and this came up. It seemed like an opportunity that doesn't present itself too frequently in your life, so I opted to take it... I wanted to see what other talents I had, so I decided this was the shot."

=== Anniversary special absences ===
Miller did not appear on the Saturday Night Live 40th Anniversary Special, and rumors spread that he and fellow alum Victoria Jackson had not been invited due to their conservative political activism. He took to Twitter to dispel the claims, saying Lorne Michaels was classy, well-mannered and invited everyone, but he declined. He later told an interviewer that he would have loved to be there, but could not due to family commitments. Miller also declined to appear at the Saturday Night Live 50th Anniversary Special.

== Eponymous shows ==
=== The Dennis Miller Show ===
After it was announced that Miller would start his own show, he was a guest on The Tonight Show Starring Johnny Carson. Carson offered him some advice while reflecting on his own 30-year career from which he was retiring in May 1992. In preparation, Miller sharpened his interviewing skills by practicing on the show's stage hands. He felt that the secret to interviewing well was listening to the guest rather than trying to set up jokes while the guest is talking. As the date for the show's opening approached, Miller told an interviewer that he was both thrilled and "scared shitless" by the opportunity. He saw Carson's approach as the standard but hoped to be original.

In 1992, Miller began hosting his eponymous late-night talk show. Syndication lasted seven months. Launched in January 1992, it was an attempt by syndicator Tribune Entertainment to carve out a niche in the late-night television landscape after Carson's retirement from The Tonight Show that May and his replacement by Jay Leno. Bob Odenkirk and Norm Macdonald served as writers for the show. The Dennis Miller Show failed to build a significant audience and was cancelled in July.

=== Dennis Miller Live ===
Beginning in 1994, Miller hosted Dennis Miller Live, a half-hour talk show on HBO. The show was taped at CBS Television City on the same stage where The Price Is Right is taped. It utilized a small set, sparse lighting, no band and Miller speaking to the largely-unseen studio audience from a darkened stage.

Miller usually hosted one guest per show, with whom he discussed the topic of the day. Early on, guests were all interviewed live via satellite, but soon most appeared live in the studio. Miller and his writing staff won five Primetime Emmy Awards during the show's run, which aired 215 episodes over nine years. HBO cancelled the show in 2002.

=== CNBC show ===
==== Background ====
Miller was considered for a prime-time talk show at MSNBC in 2002 as well as a regular commentator on the Fox News show Hannity & Colmes in 2003 before landing a prime-time political show weeknights on CNBC, simply called Dennis Miller. It began airing on January 26, 2004, in the 9:00 p.m. (ET) slot, which placed him against Hannity & Colmes.

CNBC announced that they were "comfortable with an unabashed Bush fan in the middle of its prime-time schedule in an election year." Their president Pamela Thomas-Graham said, "When we hired Dennis, we knew exactly what his political beliefs were and his viewers will hear them. The reason we hired him is we think he's witty, smart and interesting." She contrasted his political leanings to that of John McEnroe's, whose own talk show followed Miller's in the lineup.

Miller promised to serve as "an ombudsman" who will tell it like it is and become "incensed" on the viewer's behalf". When asked if he had the credentials to do a quasi-news show, Miller stressed he was an entertainer. "I don't have credibility, I'm a comedian. I'm not Ed Murrow up on the roof in a London Fog reporting on the Blitz."

==== Content ====
The hour-long show contained a daily news segment called "The Daily Rorschach," an interview segment, a panel discussion dubbed "The Varsity," and humorous field pieces by fellow SNL alum Tim Meadows and Last Comic Standing's Ant. Stylistically, Miller was seen by some as "attempting to be serious, angry, and funny all at the same time," and the show was compared to that of Bill Maher. Reviewers felt Miller's riffs would benefit from a live audience, and the show incorporated a "nightclub-style audience of 100 or so" beginning on March 9, 2004.

"The Daily Rorschach," which were wordy riffs on news events, was reminiscent of his role on SNL's Weekend Update and his HBO show. On Miller's interviews, L.A. Weekly remarked, "Miller may be up front about his own political affiliation, even to the point of shilling for the Republicans, but despite his increasingly aggressive America-first humor, he is unusually evenhanded in his selection of guests." "The Varsity," which offered a wide variety of political viewpoints on current topics, included frequent panelists Ed Schultz, Gloria Allred, Willie Brown, David Horowitz, Mickey Kaus, Steven Katz, Lawrence O'Donnell, Phil Hendrie, and Harry Shearer. In these segments, Miller acted "less like a host than a fellow conversationalist, and seems as happy to listen as to interrupt."

In the beginning of the series, Miller had a chimpanzee on the show named Ellie, who was declared a "consultant." After a few appearances Ellie was replaced by a smaller, friendlier chimp named Mo. Mo was noted for swinging across the studio on a rope, doing somersaults on the sofa while giving the appearance of reading Variety, and for nuzzling Miller while he gave his monologue.

==== Reception and cancellation ====
The group Fairness and Accuracy in Reporting objected that one of the show's producers was Mike Murphy, who was an adviser to Governor Arnold Schwarzenegger (Miller's first guest on the show), and charged that CNBC was setting up a conflict of interest.

LA Weekly praised Miller for approaching the panel in a "relatively relaxed and straightforward attitude." Despite having "worked briefly as a commentator for Hannity and Colmes on Fox, he's far from being a Murdochian attack dog, and he often sits there and sucks it up while people tell him just how awful the administration of his beloved commander-in-chief really is... Miller, it turns out, is considerably more interested in 'diversity' than some of his liberal counterparts."

The show was openly pro-President George W. Bush and its debut coincided with a major decline in Bush's approval numbers. While Miller's rating started out well with his first episode (The New York Times put the figure at 746,000 people), by March 2004 his numbers had slipped to 300,000. This was in contrasted to The Daily Show with Jon Stewart, which attracted 1.9 million viewers, and which aired at the later time slot of 11 pm.

By April 2005, Miller's viewership had declined to 107,000 (a 59% drop from the year before). CNBC canceled the show in May 2005 as part of the network's move to refocus on financial news (airings of Late Night with Conan O'Brien and shows hosted by John McEnroe and Tina Brown were also cancelled). Miller's show was replaced with a second airing of Mad Money with Jim Cramer.

=== Westwood One radio show ===
In January 2007, Miller signed a deal with Westwood One (later acquired by Dial Global, which rebranded itself as Westwood One) to launch The Dennis Miller Show, a weekday three-hour talk radio program. The program debuted on March 26, 2007, and ran through February 27, 2015. A few months into his radio show, Miller noted that his radio show best represented his actual unvarnished views, saying "This time, if I'm fired, they will be firing the real Dennis Miller."

The show's website provided a live stream of the broadcast, which was free, but a subscription to the Dennis Miller Zone (DMZ) was required in order to access archived broadcasts. The show aired on 250+ stations, airing on tape delay on some of those stations between 6–9 pm ET and 9 pm-12 am ET. His on-air sidekick "Salman" (David S. Weiss) also wrote for Dennis Miller Live. His producer Christian Bladt previously appeared on-camera as dozens of different characters during the "Daily Rorschach" segment on his CNBC television show.

Miller's program included serious discussions about American culture, current events, politics, and their place in the global context. The show was infused with Miller's sarcasm and obscure pop culture references. The first hour's opening phrase was a combination of dialogue from the film Thank You for Smoking and a U.S. space program slogan coined by Alan Shepard: "What's up, Hiroshi? Let's light this candle!" Miller's opening phrases for his second and third hours respectively were "Come to me my babies, let me quell your pain", (Powers Boothe as Jim Jones in Guyana Tragedy: The Story of Jim Jones) and "ABC – Always be closing if you want the knife set" (from Glengarry Glen Ross).

Most shows featured three guests (one per hour) as well as calls from listeners. Guests included fellow comedians and SNL alumni, pundits and authors, Presidential candidates, and sports commentators. Regulars included columnists and conservatives such as Debra Saunders, Charles Krauthammer, Victor Davis Hanson, John Bolton, Bill Kristol, and Jerome Corsi.

According to Talkers Magazine, as of spring 2011, Miller's show had an estimated 2,250,000 weekly listeners. Miller and Dial Global signed an agreement in early 2012 to continue his show for three years. Miller ended the radio show after his contract expired on March 27, 2015.

=== Dennis Miller + One ===
Miller hosted Dennis Miller + One, on RT America, a channel funded by the Russian government, from March 9, 2020, until early 2022. The half-hour program was produced by Ora TV and aired twice weekly, featuring interviews with sports and entertainment celebrities. In line with the name of the show, Miller interviewed a single guest for the entire half hour. The show replaced Larry King Now, on which Miller had been a frequent guest host until King's death in February 2021. In February 2022, following the Russian invasion of Ukraine, citing an unnamed source "familiar with [Miller's] thinking", NBC News reported that Miller has no plans to continue the show; shortly thereafter, in March, RT withdrew from the American market.

=== Recent activity ===
In 2018, Miller taped his ninth stand-up Fake News, Real Jokes. It was produced by Comedy Dynamics and streamed on Amazon, Apple, and Google Play.

On April 25, 2018, Miller began hosting a weekly podcast, The Dennis Miller Option on Podcast One (in 2019 it moved to Westwood One), but discontinued it on December 15, 2020, shortly after the election of Joe Biden, saying he was disgusted with politics and uninterested in continuing as a pundit.

Miller also hosted The Miller Minute, a twice-daily 60-second radio commentary on the day's events syndicated by Westwood One from 2018 until 2020.

In 2024, Miller came out of semi-retirement to host The Infomercials That Sold Us, a three-part docuseries on Fox Nation that provided “a nostalgic and poignant look back at the years when infomercials ruled late-night TV".

== Other endeavors ==
Miller hosted the MTV Video Music Awards in 1995 and 1996. He was also the host of HBO's 1996 series of election specials, Not Necessarily the Election.

He has appeared in various television commercials, serving as a spokesman for M&M's candies, 10-10-220 long-distance service, Miller beer, and the Internet service provider NetZero. About these activities he has remarked: "Everybody has to sell out at some point to make a living."

=== Monday Night Football ===
==== Background ====
In June 2000, Miller auditioned as an announcer for ABC's Monday Night Football, a program which was struggling with declining ratings at the time and needed a new announcer after the firing of Boomer Esiason. Miller's audition was alongside Al Michaels, the then-current announcer for Monday Night Football, in a mock broadcast. Miller's NFL knowledge surprised those in attendance. He had grown up watching the 1970s championship Steelers and was an avid watcher of the NFL draft. He had even inquired about an announcing job with Fox after they had acquired rights to show NFL games in 1994. Michaels later told an interviewer, "It was way beyond what we expected. I had no idea that he knew as much about football as he did. He made points that other analysts we brought in never made, and his points were more salient, more interesting, and better stated."

In late June 2000, Miller was announced as a new color commentator on Monday Night Football. ABC Sports President Howard Katz told The Associated Press that he approved of trying something new with the show and taking a risk. The Los Angeles Times called Miller's hiring "one of the boldest moves in sports television history." After the announcement, Miller appeared on the July 3, 2000, cover of Sports Illustrated with the title "Can Dennis Miller Save 'Monday Night Football?'" Miller told reporters that he would not try to dominate the show and insisted that his role would not be that of a comedian. Miller stated, "I'm going to try to stay in the background and ask questions a fan would ask. The rants are my HBO show and I won't try to recreate that."

==== Commentary ====
Miller and the new broadcasting team began airing through the preseason, starting on July 31, 2000. The show's official season opener was on September 4, 2000, with the Denver Broncos at the defending Super Bowl champion St. Louis Rams. Miller's performance at the official opener was met with mixed reviews. AP and The Boston Globe held that Miller had improved from preseason, but The Washington Times said he "comes off as being a smug, smarmy, smirking sort," and The Toronto Star suggested, "Send Miller back to the Comedy Channel. ... This guy just isn't very good." As his first season progressed, Miller's critics held that "he sounds scripted" and the show's ratings continued to decline. As the ratings did not improve, writers from Newsweek and USA Today began openly calling for Miller to be let go.

Throughout Miller's football coverage his commentary was sprinkled with esoteric references. A common Miller-ism was after a Hail Mary pass fell incomplete, he would say "Hail Mary is denied—separation of church and state." He also once referred to "The Greatest Show on Turf"—the St. Louis Rams offense—as the "Murderer's Row of Haste." Online options arose to offer definitions to references made by Miller on Monday Night Football: a website called "Dennis Miller Demystified," Encyclopædia Britannica's "Annotated Dennis Miller," and the Shadowpack (a "content aggregator, formatter, and e-commerce app") giving real-time explanations on personal digital assistant. Miller stated he was flattered by such attention.

==== Leaving MNF ====
Although Miller signed a contract for a third year, ABC soon began negotiations with veteran football commentator John Madden. Madden had worked at Fox Sports for eight years since the network had won the contract for the NFC Conference games away from CBS in 1994. Since getting the NFL contract, Fox had lost $4.4 billion and was looking to cut programming costs. Madden's contract for the next year would cost Fox $8 million so, when ABC was approaching Madden, Fox agreed to let him out of his remaining year. In March 2002, it was announced that Miller would be replaced by Madden, who was signed on February 28, 2002.

Miller later reflected that "the football thing was fun for me. I was in the middle of a maelstrom and I just decided not to pay attention to it because, for me, getting hired was a freakish act of nature." Elsewhere he said, "as soon as Madden left Fox, I pretty much knew I was going to be whacked. Here was Madden, the Pliny the Elder of football announcers. And they were going to stay with the kid? I was having fun. I had alienated half the community, and probably half of them liked me." Al Michaels, while overjoyed to work with Madden, praised Miller, saying, "what he tried to do was the hardest thing ever attempted in broadcasting. No other non-football person or someone of that ilk could have pulled it off as well as he did."

In 2010, TV Guide Network listed Miller's stint at No. 12 on their list of 25 Biggest TV Blunders, while Awful Announcing put him at No. 1 in their list of the Top 10 Sports Media Busts.

=== Fox News, game shows, and Sports Unfiltered ===
Miller frequently guested on Fox News in the late 2000s. He appeared on 13 of the 17 aired episodes of the comedy show The 1/2 Hour News Hour in 2007. He had a weekly segment called "Miller Time" on The O'Reilly Factor, and has also appeared on Red Eye w/ Greg Gutfeld.

Miller briefly co-hosted the game show Grand Slam, which aired on GSN for eight episodes in 2007. For one month, Miller hosted Amne$ia for NBC. The show was a replacement program commissioned during the 2007–08 Writers Guild of America strike and was canceled once the strike was resolved and scripted programming returned to the network.

In November 2007, Versus tapped Miller to host Sports Unfiltered, a weekly one-hour sports talk show. It was canceled after eight episodes.

== Comedic style ==
For the first year and a half of his comedy career, Miller relied heavily on props, but he felt this limited him and switched to using purely language. To address the stage-fright he developed when initially beginning his stand-up career, Miller later stated "I got up there and acted like the guy I always wanted to be to get through it... it's a part of me, but it's not the real me." He kept his hands in his pockets to appear unfazed, or adjusted his cuffs during an audience laugh to give the appearance of indifference to approval. Miller pointed out that part of his act is to show a "hipper-than-thou" persona, but then purposely undermine it at regular intervals for comedic effect.

Miller has a laid-back style (for example, calling people "babe" or "cat") with a characteristic spoken cadence. His sense of humor is alternately acerbic, sardonic, snarky, droll and/or brooding. He frequently employs a rant, which may begin with "Now, I don't want to get off on a rant here, but..." before launching into a passionate diatribe on a particular subject, ending with "...of course, that's just my opinion. I could be wrong."

Miller listed his comedic influences for The New York Times as including "Jonathan Miller, Richard Pryor, Richard Belzer and Mr. [Jay] Leno." When the Times asked him about the comedians Mort Sahl and Lenny Bruce, to whom he is often compared, Miller stated that he had been impressed with transcripts of Sahl's early work but that as Sahl's career continued he became too tied to the Kennedy family and became a "savage name-dropper," which diminished him in Miller's eyes, and served as an example for him to avoid. Miller had no respect for Bruce, telling the Times, "Lenny was a heroin addict, and I couldn't care less about heroin addicts. Once I hear a guy is a heroin addict, and they tell me he's a genius, I think, 'Really?' I'm not trying to be judgmental. But anybody whose last vision is of a tile pattern on a bathroom floor, I don't know what kind of genius they are."

Describing his career Miller stated, "It's all been built on arcane references, precision of language, and a reasonably imperturbable nature on TV. The basics are there, but I've been getting paid, making a living and having fun with it for next to 25 years, and you know that blows my mind that I've stuck with it. That's my favorite part of showbiz, hangin' in, knowing that something good is coming along. ... When I was starting, I thought I'd have to have a sword-in-the-stone moment of inspiration where I'd have to lay around for it to be visited on me. SNL was just a machine, and if you screwed two or three 'Updates' up, guess what, they have someone new and ready to go. So I learned how to pick up any newspaper and have five usable jokes in five minutes. "I don't ever wanna get self-important. I'm a comedian, and I want everyone in my life to know it. The stream-of-consciousness style is my monkey trick. I sit there, I watch stuff, and cultural references bump into my head. I watched a lot of TV when I was a kid."

Miller has referred to his casual stage-style as "quasi-Dean Martin insouciance." When asked if he has accepted others' title of him as "the 'intelligent' comedian," he replied, "The smartest thing I ever did was not buying into the fact that people thought I was smart. I was telling jokes about where I named the robot maid for The Jetsons. It's just a joke. I just did jokes. I never had my head up my ass that I mattered. I'm trying to get laughs... I'm OK [intelligence-wise]. I remember I had a writer once who told me—and we disagreed about everything, so I know he didn't think I was smart—but he said, 'I'll give you this. You have a deep drawer and a nice retrieval system.' I always thought that was a good appraisal of whatever limited comedy gift I had. I have a pretty good memory for pop arcana and a pretty quick retrieval system."

== Personal life ==
Miller married Carolyn "Ali" Espley, a former model from Vancouver, British Columbia on April 24, 1988. Espley is best known as the girl in Kajagoogoo's 1983 "Too Shy" music video. The couple live in Santa Barbara and have two sons who were born in 1990 and 1993.

== Political views ==
Although in his early years of fame he was perceived as a staunch liberal and an outspoken critic of Republicans, Miller later became known for his neoconservative political opinions.

=== Early outlook ===
When asked if his political outlook was a result of early influence by his parents, Miller told a reporter "I didn't know my dad—he moved out early. And my mom's politics were kind of hardscrabble. She didn't think about Democrats or Republicans. She thought about who made sense. I've been both in my life. Somebody can say they don't understand why somebody drifts. But I've always found people who drift interesting, 'cause it shows me the game's not stagnant in their own head. They're thinking."

In 1995, Miller told USA Today: "I might be profane and opinionated, but underneath all that are some pretty conservative feelings. On most issues, between Clinton and Newt Gingrich, I'd choose Newt in a second, even though he is a bit too exclusionary." Miller also declared himself a "conservative libertarian" in a 1996 Playboy interview.

Miller later told American Enterprise that one of the reasons he became more conservative was due to liberal critiques of Mayor Rudy Giuliani's approach to fighting crime in New York City, which began around 1994. "When I kept hearing liberals equating Giuliani with Hitler—that's when I really left the reservation. Even before 9/11, I'd travel to New York and say, 'Wow, this city certainly seems to be running better. Giuliani is the kind of leader I admire. When it's five below zero and you arrest somebody to get him inside off the street—that's not something Hitler would do. It made me realize that I was with the wrong group if that's what Hitler looked like to them."

=== Post September 11 attacks ===
Following the September 11 attacks, Miller's political ideology changed significantly and his conservative views became more publicly known. His move from the Democratic to the Republican Party was further facilitated by watching a 2004 presidential primary debate among nine Democrats. "I haven't seen a starting nine like that since the '62 Mets," he remarked.

In 2006, Slate commentator Dennis Cass describes Miller's political evolution from a "left-leaning, Dada-ist wisenheimer" to a "tell-it-like-it-is, right-wing blowhard." The perceived change did not surprise former SNL colleague and former Democratic Party Senator Al Franken, who noted Miller had always had a "conservative streak." In another interview Franken stated, "Dennis was always sort of conservative on certain kinds of issues. I am not quite sure why he decided to become a comedian with a dog in the fight, but as a comedian with a dog in the fight I sympathize with him."

His political outspokenness led him to become one of the few Hollywood celebrities backing George W. Bush and the war in Iraq. In 2003, The Weekly Standard called Miller "the loudest pro-Bush/pro-war voice in Hollywood", and quoted his comments on The Tonight Show with Jay Leno from February of that year, where Miller advocated invading Iraq and vented his displeasure at France's lack of support for the idea. Los Angeles Times noted that he was "raising his political profile" at this time, and that he "spoke out passionately in favor of the war in Iraq. He has made frequent appearances on conservative talk radio; he does weekly political commentary for Hannity & Colmes, a Fox News Channel talk show." That same year, The National Review wrote, "Conservatives ... have welcomed and even cheered the comedian's unabashed patriotism and endorsement of President Bush's foreign—and, in certain cases, domestic—policy." They noted that "During appearances on The Tonight Show, he has also advocated profiling at airports and oil-drilling in the Arctic National Wildlife Refuge."

While he was not at all shy about expressing his conservative views on topics such as taxes and foreign policy, Miller was quick to point out that he is quite liberal on many social issues. During a 2004 interview, Miller said "If two gay guys want to get married, it's none of my business. I could care less. More power to them. I'm happy when people fall in love." He added, "I think abortion's wrong, but it's none of my business to tell somebody what's wrong. So I'm pro-choice. I want to keep my nose out of other people's personal business." In 2006, he noted in an interview with Penn Jillette that his liberal attitude on social issues made him a libertarian, saying "that's what I am, I'll be honest with you."

In 2007, Miller admitted that his open conservatism may have cost him some passing acquaintances, but it has not affected "my dear friends. I certainly hope our friendship runs deeper than that. I still have some ultra-liberal friends." In a 2012 interview, Miller showed no concern over whether his political stance had made him less popular or robbed him of the credit of popularizing comedic rants, saying, "I'm a 58-year-old man and I'm happy where I'm at. I don't think about any of that. I go on O'Reilly once a week, I do my radio show and I go on the road about 20 dates a year... If you're 58 and you're still worrying about whether you're popular, what are you, in eighth grade?"

=== George W. Bush ===
Miller made several jokes about the George W. Bush administration before 9/11. He poked fun at George W. Bush's intelligence on Monday Night Football, saying "God, the man thinks Croatia is the show that's on after Moesha." In another incident he joked, "Bush can't walk and fart at the same time." In January 2001 on his HBO series, Miller joked, "Condoleezza Rice has often been described as W's 'foreign policy tutor.' Oh, yeah, I love the sound of that. It's nice to know we're signing our nuclear arsenal over to a man who needs after-school help."

After 9/11, Miller's opinion on Bush changed significantly. In 2003, Miller told an interviewer that he was impressed by Bush for pursuing "the liquidation of terrorism," even though "that's not gonna be finished in his lifetime... But to take the first step? Ballsy." In October 2003, Miller praised Bush in an interview with The American Enterprise, saying, "He's much smarter than his enemies think he is. I think he's a genius. People whine about him getting into Yale—the way I see it, if your old man buys a building you should get into Yale! But I think he could have gotten into Yale on his own; he's a very smart man." He also noted Bush's faith, saying "In this messed up world, I like seeing my President pray... This is an infinitely complex world, and at some point one has to have faith in one's religion. I find it endearing that President Bush prays to God and that he's not an agnostic or an atheist. I'm glad there's someone higher that he has to answer to."

Miller began to appear at events for Bush starting in 2003. In June, Miller spoke at the President's fund-raisers in San Francisco and Los Angeles. After the San Francisco appearance, he was invited to ride in the Presidential limousine and fly on Air Force One to travel to the dinner at Los Angeles. Miller also sat in the gallery at President Bush's State of the Union address on January 21, 2004. That same month, Miller told The Associated Press that his CNBC show was not going to do any jokes about George W. Bush, explaining, "I like him. I'm going to give him a pass. I take care of my friends." Miller later reflected in a 2008 interview: "I thought it was so integral that he got re-elected that I laid off him for awhile."

Reflecting on his thoughts near the end of Bush's second term in 2007, Miller still had good words when talking about Bush. "After 9/11 it was a different world. One where crazies strap a bomb to their kids in the name of religion. Bush and [Rudy] Giuliani were fearless leaders during the national crisis. Thank God Bush chose to stay on the offense."

=== Candidacy consideration ===
In 2003, Rob Stutzman and other members of the leadership for the Californian Republican party, after seeing the political success of Arnold Schwarzenegger, approached Miller in an effort to draft him to challenge Democratic Senator Barbara Boxer.

When asked about the possibility of facing a Miller candidacy, Boxer spokesman Roy Behr dismissed his odds: "The Republican Party has gone through a desperate search to find someone who is remotely credible—they've looked at everybody and everything, and they couldn't find anybody, so they're looking at bringing in the circus." The Weekly Standard's Bill Whalen saw that, with the ascent of Schwarzenegger, other celebrities were considering political careers (such as Republican Kelsey Grammer). Examining Miller's chances for the Senate seat the Standard pointed out that it was "hard to imagine a candidate quicker on the draw or more withering in a debate" and noted other Republican celebrities successfully made the transition to elected politician because they "embodied optimism." Miller, the Standard proclaimed, was seen in contrast as "both terribly erudite... and decidedly yuppie (the comedian endorses DirecTV and Amstel Light...) Not to mention a little too edgy for some Republicans." When asked about Miller's chances, Martin Kaplan, director of USC's Norman Lear Center, theorized that Miller might face a tough primary battle to win the Republican nomination from other members of the party that had actual political experience.

By November 2003, The New York Times did a piece on the Republican opposition to Boxer and reported that "Mr. Miller was never serious about the idea, Republican officials who spoke with him say. ... 'Dennis has never contacted us,' said George M. Sundheim III, chairman of the state Republican Party". The Times pointed out that while the Republican Party was talking about drafting him, Miller "had signed a multiyear contract with CNBC as a political talk show host."

Miller, invoking his pleasant home life in Santa Barbara with his wife and two children, later told The New York Times, "They inquired about my availability to run against Barbara Boxer, but I'm not at the point where I would consider it." He expanded on the subject in an interview with Time magazine saying he had declined the draft offer because "At some point that involves moving to Washington, D.C., sitting in a room all day with a moron like Barbara Boxer. I'm just not interested." He told the Associated Press, "Maybe when I get older I would think about it, just as a lark, view it as its own form of a TV show. I think it would be fun to get in there and turn out the whole process—just refuse to play, and don't budge. Get rid of me if you want, but I'm just going to do what I want."

=== Political support ===
In 1988, Miller voted for George H. W. Bush, a fact he brought up in 1992 as proof that he was "essentially conservative."

In 1992, Miller, who had endorsed the candidacy of Jerry Brown during the Democratic primaries, moved his support to Independent candidate Ross Perot. Miller volunteered for Ross Perot's candidacy at his San Fernando Valley campaign office. Miller told a reporter, "I don't know that you need to know that much about him. He's an outsider, and the two-party system is going to hell." Miller stated that he had become "really grossed out by the system after observing the behavior of politicians in both parties during the confirmation hearings of Justice Clarence Thomas. When Ross Perot dropped out of the Presidential race on July 16, 1992, saying he feared a conspiracy against his family, many began to joke about his sanity. On July 30, 1995, Miller told a reporter, "I'd vote for him [Perot] tomorrow. I don't think he's a genius but I love the thought of him at State Dinners mistaking the Queen of Denmark for Kaye Ballard. People say to me, 'You wouldn't want Ross Perot with his finger on the button.' But believe me, they would never let Ross Perot near the real button. They would rig up a stunt button for him, and if he ever pressed it, it would squirt him in the face with milk or something."

In 1995, considering the candidates for president, Miller told a reporter, "I don't respect Bill Clinton. He's the same as [George H. W.] Bush or [Bob] Dole. Clinton's my age, and I know how full of shit I am. So I look at him and think, 'I know you. You're the guy who used to tap the keg.'" He continued to mock Clinton when he won the Presidency, and later admitted to voting for Bob Dole in the 1996 election (despite Perot being on the ballot in every state).

On February 21, 2007, while appearing as a guest on The O'Reilly Factor, and again on May 25, 2007, while appearing as a guest on The Tonight Show, Miller stated that he initially supported Rudy Giuliani for President in 2008. After Giuliani's departure from the race he redirected his support to John McCain. Miller said that he gave Barack Obama six to eight months before forming an opinion on him, because he saw that his election was inspiring to black youth and hoped it would be healing. He came to the conclusion that Obama was mostly hype, and in actuality, "He's an inept civil servant who stinks."

Miller endorsed Herman Cain in the 2012 Republican primary, but later dropped his support, saying of Cain, "He can't win!" He later campaigned for Mitt Romney in the general election. After the Presidential election of 2012, Miller appeared on Fox News and said that under Obama, the US is on the road to the "European model".

In 2016, Miller did not endorse any particular Republican primary candidate. By December 16, 2015, he told Bill O'Reilly, "I would vote for any of them over Hillary, except for Lindsey Graham... and Pataki." Miller became a strong supporter of Donald Trump in the 2016 U.S. general election, addressing a tweet to Republicans who were uncertain after Trump wrapped up the nomination: "Don't kid yourself. At this point, any vote for anyone that is not Donald Trump is a vote for Hillary Clinton. Also, both Presidential boxes left blank is a vote for Hillary Clinton because, as mindless as Liberals can be, even they don't enter into suicide pacts with that petulant, whiny part of themselves."

== Media ==
=== Film ===
- Madhouse (1990) – Wes
- Disclosure (1994) – Mark Lewyn
- The Net (1995) – Dr. Alan Champion
- Never Talk to Strangers (1995) – Cliff Raddison
- Bordello of Blood (1996) – Rafe Guttman
- Murder at 1600 (1997) – Detective Steve Stengel
- Joe Dirt (2001) – Zander Kelly
- Thank You for Smoking (2005) – himself
- What Happens in Vegas (2008) – Judge Whopper
- The Campaign (2012) – himself
- Joe Dirt 2 (2015) – Zander Kelly

=== TV shows ===
- MTV Movie Awards (1992) - himself/host
- The Dennis Miller Show (1992) - himself
- Dennis Miller Live (1994- 2002) - himself
- Space Ghost Coast to Coast (2003) – himself
- Boston Public (2003) – Charlie Bixby
- House of Cards (2013) – himself

=== Video games ===
- You Don't Know Jack Volume 2 (1996) - Himself

=== Comedy specials ===
- Mr. Miller Goes to Washington (1988)
- The 13th Annual Young Comedians Special (1989) (host)
- The Earth Day Special (1990)
- Black & White (1990)
- Live from Washington, D.C.: They Shoot HBO Specials, Don't They? (1993)
- State of the Union Undressed (1995)
- Citizen Arcane (1996)
- The Millennium Special: 1,000 Years, 100 Laughs, 10 Really Good Ones (1999)
- The Raw Feed (2003)
- Dennis Miller: All In (2006)
- The Big Speech (2010)
- America 180 (2014)
- Fake News, Real Jokes (2018)

=== Audio ===
- The Off-White Album (Warner Records, 1988)
- The Rants (Random House Audio, 1996)
- Ranting Again (Random House Audio, 1998)
- Rants Redux (Random House Audio, 1999)
- I Rant, Therefore I Am (Random House Audio, 2000)
- The Rant Zone: An All-Out Blitz Against Soul-Sucking Jobs, Twisted Child Stars, Holistic Loons, and People Who Eat Their Dogs! (HarperAudio, 2001)
- Still Ranting After All These Years (HarperAudio, 2004)
- America 180 (New Wave Dynamics 2014)

=== Print ===
- The Rants (Doubleday, 1996) ISBN 0-385-47804-6
- Ranting Again (Doubleday, 1999) ISBN 0-385-48852-1
- I Rant, Therefore I Am (Doubleday, 2000) ISBN 0-385-49535-8
- The Rant Zone: An All-Out Blitz Against Soul-Sucking Jobs, Twisted Child Stars, Holistic Loons, and People Who Eat Their Dogs! (HarperCollins, 2001) ISBN 0-06-621066-6
