= The Autumn Wind =

Sports-themed poem used by the Las Vegas Raiders football team

"The Autumn Wind" is a combination of musical score by Sam Spence and a sports-themed poem adapted for the 1974 Oakland Raiders season coverage by NFL Films President and co-founder Steve Sabol (1942–2012, son of founder Ed Sabol, 1916–2015).

The original 1941 poem "Pirate Wind" by Mary Jane Carr (1895–1988) is nearly identical, yet mentions colors like yellow and red that don't fit into the silver-and-black Raiders style. Describing the atmosphere of autumn weather, as it relates to pro football season, as well as the eye-patched outlaw traits of the team nickname and mascot, the poem is synonymous with the National Football League (NFL)'s Oakland/Los Angeles/Las Vegas Raiders franchise. Narrated by John Facenda, this 1974 production has been dubbed "The Battle Hymn of the Raider Nation" as music and poem are often heard blaring out of the speakers at Raiders games.

The poem was first used for the team's official team yearbook film in 1974, of the same title, and also for NFL Films' hour-long recap of the 1974 season. Legend has it that when Raider owner and managing general partner Al Davis heard "The Autumn Wind" song for the first time, he remained silent for a second before telling then NFL Films President Ed Sabol that he loved it, and that "it epitomized everything that the Raiders stood for".

It has been used on numerous official NFL Films audio album soundtracks, most notably The Power & The Glory LP, featuring Facenda narrating over it, as well as numerous other tracks composed and conducted by Sam Spence and played by the NFL Films Orchestra. Rapper, actor and Raider fan Ice Cube uses the first and last quartets to introduce his song "Raider Nation", the theme for Straight Outta L.A., his ESPN 30 for 30 documentary about how the Raiders' time in Los Angeles coincided with, among other things, the rise of N.W.A and hip hop in Los Angeles.

== Lines ==
Sabol	Carr
The Autumn Wind is a pirate Blustering in from sea, With a rollicking song, he sweeps along, Swaggering boisterously. His face is weather beaten. He wears a hooded sash, With a silver hat about his head, And a bristling black mustache. He growls as he storms the country, A villain big and bold. And the trees all shake and quiver and quake, As he robs them of their gold. The Autumn Wind is a Raider, Pillaging just for fun. He'll knock you 'round and upside down, And laugh when he's conquered and won.	The autumn wind's a pirate, Blustering in from sea; With a rollicking song, he sweeps along, Swaggering boisterously. His skin is weather-beaten; He wears a yellow sash. With a handkerchief red about his head, And a bristling black mustache. He laughs as he storms the country, A loud laugh and a bold; And the trees all quake and shiver and shake, As he robs them of their gold. The autumn wind's a pirate, Pillaging just for fun; He'll snatch your hat as quick as that. And laugh to see you run!
