= Yankees Universe =

American charitable organization

Yankees Universe is a charity that supports the Memorial Sloan Kettering Cancer Center in Manhattan. Created by Mindy Franklin Levine, the wife of New York Yankees President Randy Levine, the program raises money for the New York Yankees Universe fund. Proceeds for the fund are generated by donations, special events, and the sale of Yankees Universe T-shirts, and this money is made available to the cancer center. According to the MSKCC web site, the proceeds "go directly to support pediatric cancer research and care, helping to contribute to advancements in the treatment of children with cancer."

== Popularity ==
Since the inception in April 2006 the phrase has gained popularity and now frequently appears in the press – including the New York Post, May 2007: "Roger Clemens pitches well nobody will criticize him for coming and going in the Yankees' Universe". However, the phrase has been found in the popular press at least as early as 2001. As a result, some fans now consider "Yankees Universe" the unofficial name of the Yankee fanbase, as the team has a nationwide following and often attracts large crowds of its own fans at other Major League ballparks, especially Baltimore, Kansas City and Seattle.

== See also ==
- Bills Mafia
- Red Sox Nation
- Cardinal Nation
- Steeler Nation
- Raider Nation
