= Vincent McMahon =

Vincent McMahon may refer to:

- Vince McMahon (born 1945), former chairman and CEO of World Wrestling Entertainment
- Vincent J. McMahon (1914–1984), wrestling promoter
- Vincent McMahon (cricketer) (1918–1988), Australian cricketer
