= Cardinals Nation =

Fans of the St. Louis Cardinals baseball franchise

Cardinals Nation, or Redbird Nation, is a term commonly used to describe, in aggregate, the fans of the St. Louis Cardinals baseball franchise. Cardinals Nation encompasses not just the area around St. Louis, but also a large portion of the Midwest. The team is traditionally popular in this region and Cardinals games are broadcast on radio and TV on FanDuel Sports Midwest. The term "Cardinal Nation" has been in use since the 1930s, when the team's success and St. Louis radio greatly increased the Cardinals' popularity over a large area of the United States. "Cardinals Nation" remains a major term in team promotion.

In addition, the team is also popular in other major league markets, most notably in Colorado, where the Cardinals were the team of choice until the creation of the Rockies franchise in 1993. To this day, the Cardinals have many fans in attendance at games on the road in Denver, as well as every other major league venue.

== Historical background ==
Major League Baseball experienced a half-century of stability from 1902 through 1952, during which no franchises moved and none were established or closed. During this time, the Cardinals were the westernmost and southernmost major league franchise. They were geographically the closest team to anyone living southwest of a line stretching approximately from Savannah, Georgia through Central Illinois into the Dakotas, an area encompassing much the greater portion of the United States. (The Cardinals shared this distinction with the St. Louis Browns, but the Browns were generally less successful and less popular.)

Although some franchises were established at the outer periphery of this area beginning in the 1950s (The Braves in Milwaukee in 1953, teams in California beginning in 1958, the Twins in Minneapolis in 1961) it was not until the move of the A's from Philadelphia to Kansas City in 1955 followed by the establishment of the Houston Colt .45s in 1962, the shift of the Braves to Atlanta in 1966, and the creation of the Kansas City Royals in 1969 (replacing the A's, who had moved to Oakland in 1968) that significant inroads into this market began. (The Browns left St. Louis after 1953, ending whatever competition they offered for this fan base.)

During this period (1902 to 1955 and to some extent later) when the Cardinals were the closest team to a vast geographical area, baseball became firmly established as America's national pastime and by far its premier professional sport. Also during this time, commercial radio broadcasting – including broadcasting of baseball games – was widely adopted and commonplace, and broadcasting at night and on television began. Also during this period the population of the Cardinals' mediashed grew considerably, even compared to the rest of the United States (the mean center of United States population moved from Indiana to the approximate location of St. Louis during this time).

During the core of this period the Cardinals were generally successful on the field, often contending for the league title and winning two pennants in the 1920s, three in the 1930s, and four in the 1940s (the Cardinals in their overall history have the fourth-best overall percentage of baseball's 30 teams, at about .520). In the latter part of this period, the Cardinals' games began airing on the 50,000-watt clear-channel radio station KMOX, which has the power to reach almost all of the continental United States at night.

All these factors combined such that for most of the 20th century the Cardinals' listening audience, and consequently fan base, extended throughout the American south and deep into the plains and Rocky Mountain states, a state of affairs that, although diminished, has persisted into the 21st century to some degree. As of 2020, the Cardinals still had the largest radio network in Major League Baseball, with 145 affiliated stations in eight states.

In 2019, attendance at Cardinal home games grew to 3.48 million. In 2022, the Cardinals were one of four teams with over 3 million in attendance, including Los Angeles Dodgers, New York Yankees, and Atlanta Braves. Cardinal fans are found in multiple states outside of Missouri and Illinois, such as Indiana, Iowa, Arkansas, Kentucky, Tennessee, Mississippi, Oklahoma, Alabama, and Kansas.

== In St. Louis ==
St. Louis has frequently been named one of the best baseball cities in the United States, a distinction also claimed by cities such as Boston. The Cardinals have won 19 National League pennants (third most, after Los Angeles Dodgers and the San Francisco Giants) and hold a National League record of 11 World Series Championships, second overall only to the New York Yankees, who have 27.

Cardinals fans are known for traveling in large numbers to away games, particularly for their classic rivalry against the Chicago Cubs filling the Wrigley Field, and the Cubs fans similarly travel to St. Louis, filling Busch Stadium in turn. When the Royals play the Cardinals in Kansas City every season during interleague play, the games often sell out.

Harry Caray began broadcasting Cardinals games in 1945 and was joined by Jack Buck in 1954; the two called games together until Caray's departure in 1969. Buck remained the voice of the Cardinals, teaming with Mike Shannon from 1972 until his retirement in 2001. Both Buck in 1987, and Caray in 1989 received the Baseball Hall of Fame's Ford C. Frick Award for broadcasting excellence.

== Winter Warm Up ==
Like many other teams, Cardinals fans have a gathering of their own before the start of the regular season. During the Third week of January, Cardinals fans gather together at the Hyatt Regency in Downtown St. Louis at a pre-season convention called "Winter Warm Up", which is run by Cardinals Care - the charity fundraising arm of the Cardinals' organization. The last day takes place on Martin Luther King Day. Cardinals fans are directed to the opportunity to get autographs from many of their favorite Cardinal players - past and present. All proceeds from the event, including those derived from the sale of autograph tickets for certain players (though some of them sign for free), go directly to Cardinals Care.

== See also ==
- Red Sox Nation
- Yankees Universe
- Steeler Nation
- Raider Nation
