= Mary Jane Carr =

American writer

- Born: April 23, 1895; Portland, Oregon, U.S.
- Died: January 4, 1988 (aged 92); Portland, Oregon, U.S.
- Occupation: Author
- Writing career
- Genres: Children's Literature, Biographies
- Notable works: Children of the Covered Wagon, Young Mac of Fort Vancouver andPeggy and Paul and Laddy

Mary Jane Carr (April 23, 1895 – January 4, 1988) was an American author. Carr wrote her first poem at the age of eight. While at high school, she relied on her writing to pay her way through school. She had a contract with Walt Disney. Other than poems and stories, she also published plays for children. She made a career in journalism, spending several years editing the newspapers for Catholic Sentinel. Her first book, Children of the Covered Wagon, was published in 1934. This novel would be filmed under the title Westward Ho the Wagons! (1956), through Walt Disney Productions. Young Mac of Fort Vancouver and Peggy and Paul and Laddy also contributed to her fame.

Carr's poem "Pirate Wind" (Top of the Morning, 1941) was adapted in 1974 as The Autumn Wind by Steve Sabol for NFL Films coverage of the 1974 Oakland Raiders season.

== Biography ==
Mary Jane Carr was born in Portland, Oregon. She knew she wanted to be a writer around the time she began reading. Carr was one of nine siblings. Her father was an attorney that taught in his younger days. He used to read to her and her siblings on winter evenings. The poems her father read to her made her enjoy the rhythm and music in poetry. After her father died, she found a poem she was struggling to write as a child. In the mix of his papers, it brought back memories she and her father shared.

Carr attended an all girls school that was known as St Mary's College. It is now known as Marylhurst University where she began working towards journalism. She also began proofreading and editorial writing. Her first position in the newspaper was giving to her by her college history professor. Carr's first book was published in 1934. She has three books that were published and transcribed into Braille in many schools.

Mary Jane Carr died on January 4, 1988, at the age of 92 in her hometown of Portland.

== Works list ==
- The Magic of May, 1928
- Children Of The Covered Wagon, 1934
- Peggy and Paul and Laddy, 1936
- Young Mac of Fort Vancouver, 1940
- Top of the Morning, 1941
