= Fred Gaudelli =

American television producer

Alfred R. Gaudelli (born August 13, 1960) is an American television producer. He is best known for his 33-year run as a producer for NFL football games.

== Career ==
Gaudelli was hired by ESPN in March 1983 in their remote production department. He worked on several different sports, including college football, college basketball and college baseball, the USFL, the U.S. Olympic Festival and the NFL Draft. In 1986 he produced Thursday Night college football for ESPN. He introduced live tracking pitch speed during the 1988 College World Series. He produced ESPN's Sunday Night Football telecasts from 1990 to 2000.

From 2006 to 2023, he served as executive producer for Sunday Night Football on NBC. During his career, he was producer for seven Super Bowls, (XXXVII, XL, XLIII, XLVI, XLIX, LII, and LVI. In 2013, Gaudelli replaced Faith Hill's Sunday Night Football introduction song with the same song done by Carrie Underwood. In 2017, he produced the first game with coverage from "skycam".

== Awards and honors ==
Gaudelli won 24 Emmy Awards for his work producing NFL games, and in August 2020 was elected to the Sports Broadcasting Hall of Fame.

In 2023, he received the Pete Rozelle Radio-Television Award from the Pro Football Hall of Fame.
