= Dennis Drinkwater =

American businessman (born 1943)

- Born: 1943 (age 82–83)

Dennis V. Drinkwater (born 1943) is an American businessman. In 1969, he co-founded, with Lance Cramer, Giant Glass, with which he became a millionaire. He is also known for his regular attendance at home games of the Boston Red Sox, and is considered one of the team's biggest fans.

== Early life ==
Drinkwater was born in 1943. He grew up in Wakefield, Massachusetts, and attended Wakefield High School and Salem State University. He played baseball for both schools, then for around twenty more years in the Inter-City League. He also founded and managed the Lawrence Giants, a semi-pro baseball team.

== Career ==
In 1969, Drinkwater co-founded Giant Glass in North Andover, Massachusetts, with business partner Lance Cramer. They owned the business for 33 years, selling it to Safelite Group in 2012.

== Sports ==
Drinkwater is considered to be one of the biggest fans of the Boston Red Sox. He is in regular attendance at home games of Fenway Park, with his permanent seat located directly behind home plate. He misses only a handful of games each season, mostly due to having to live in Florida for a portion of the year for tax reasons. He has been to each of Fenway Park's opening days since 1960. He went to his first Red Sox game with his mother in 1951, and bought first season ticket in 1978. When John Henry's investment management firm purchased the Red Sox franchise in 2001, Drinkwater approached them about sponsorship. The team's president, Sam Kennedy, asked Drinkwater to pick out four seats for his permanent season tickets, and he chose them in the front row behind home plate. He is nicknamed "8 and two-thirds" by fellow Red Sox fans, due to his proclivity for leaving with two out in the bottom of the ninth inning in order to "beat the traffic."

As of 2021, he had been to fifty consecutive Super Bowls and, between 1986 and 2001, he attended 250 consecutive New York Giants games, home and away.

== Personal life ==
Drinkwater is married to Jacqueline, with whom he has one son.

== See also ==
- Red Sox Nation
