= Aubrey Sinden =

English cricketer, airman (1917 – 1988)

Personal information
- Full name: Aubrey Maurice Sinden
- Born: 17 November 1917; East Grinstead, Sussex, England
- Died: 13 January 1988 (aged 70); Copthorne, Sussex, England
- Batting: Right-handed
- Role: Occasional wicket-keeper

Domestic team information
- Years: Team
- 1945/46: Europeans

Career statistics
Competition	First-class
Matches	1
Runs scored	76
Batting average	38.00
100s/50s	–/1
Top score	56
Catches/stumpings	–/–
- Source: Cricinfo, 31 December 2023

Aubrey Maurice Sinden (16 November 1917 – 13 January 1988) was an English first-class cricketer, accountant, and local politician. He played one first-class match for the Europeans cricket team during the 1945–46 Bombay Pentangular tournament in British India.

== Early life and military service ==
Sinden was born on 16 November 1917 at East Grinstead, West Sussex, England. During the Second World War, he served in the Royal Air Force.

== Cricket career ==
While serving in British India after the war, Sinden played one first-class cricket match for the Europeans cricket team against the Hindus at Brabourne Stadium in Bombay during the 1945–46 Bombay Pentangular.

Batting twice in the match, he scored 20 runs in the Europeans' first innings before being dismissed by Dattu Phadkar. In the second innings, he opened the batting and was run out for 56 runs, sharing a 75-run opening partnership with Reg Simpson.

Upon returning to England, Sinden played club cricket for East Grinstead Cricket Club. He was also active in association football, playing as a centre-forward for East Grinstead Town F.C..

== Professional career and politics ==
Outside of sport, Sinden worked as an accountant. He was also involved in local politics in East Grinstead, standing as a candidate for election in 1953.

== Death ==
Sinden died on 13 January 1988 at Copthorne, Sussex.
