= Raider Nation =

Official fanbase for the NFL's Las Vegas Raiders

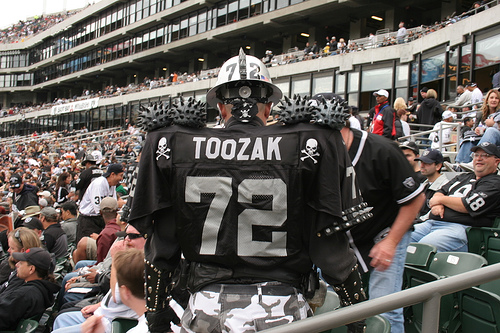
Members of Raider Nation are known for dressing in elaborate costumes.

Raider Nation is the official name for the fans of the National Football League (NFL)'s Las Vegas Raiders (formerly the Oakland Raiders and the Los Angeles Raiders). Fan Jim Hudson coined the term in the 1990s when the Raiders returned to Oakland after a long hiatus in Los Angeles, thus becoming a team with a regional fanbase.

The team's fans devotion is chronicled in Better to Reign in Hell, a book written by San Diego English professor Jim Miller and Kelly Mayhew, who are Raiders fans.

== Characteristics ==
The city of Oakland's working-class background and "underdog status" compared to its neighboring city of San Francisco is cited as the foundation of the Raider Nation and its image, as is the influence of "outlaws" such as owner Al Davis, head coach Jon Gruden and players like Jack Tatum, Goerge Atkinson, Ted Hendricks, Skip Thomas, Ken Stabler, Gene Upshaw,, Willie Brown, Bob Brown, Lester Hayes, John Matuszak, Lyle Alzado, Steve Wisniewski, Bill Romanowski, Vontaze Burfict, Richie Incognito, Damon Arnette and Maxx Crosby all contributed to creating a bad boy image. The team's aggressive style of play during the 1970s and 1980s, when the Raiders won their three Super Bowls, is also mentioned. This perception did not change when the Raiders moved to Los Angeles and Las Vegas, but the move did diversify their fan base to include more African Americans and Latinos, and the Raiders would become increasingly associated with West Coast gangsta rap groups like: N.W.A, Compton's Most Wanted, Luniz and Cypress Hill during this period. Multiple heavy metal bands would also express their support for the team, including: Metallica, Slayer, Testament, Machine Head, and Megadeth. This association would lead to the Raider Nation to grow a reputation as a gritty, intimidating notoriety amongst fans and celebrities alike; spreading across the country as fans express their longtime devotion to the team.

Members of Raider Nation take pride in their image, and many of the most devoted Raiders fans dress up in elaborate costumes on game day. Many of these costumes are intended to be intimidating and eccentric while also adhering to the Raiders' silver and black color scheme, and many fans also create alter egos for these characters as well. These fans are typically the ones that are most associated with the Raider Nation and The Black Hole. Actress and singer Naya Rivera was a notable fan; her brother Mychal played tight end for the team between 2013 and 2016. Rapper Ice Cube is one of the Raiders' best-known fans, having been a vocal supporter since the 1980s He has written songs about the team and has appeared in many videos promoting the team.

"The Autumn Wind", first released in 1974, has become the fight song of Raider Nation and can be heard aloud at every game.

== Notable fans ==
- 50 Cent
- Alexander De Leon
- Anjelah Johnson
- Anthony Kiedis
- Axl Rose
- B Real
- Billie Joe Armstrong
- Blackie Lawless
- Bray Wyatt
- Bret Hart
- Carlos Santana
- Cindy Blackman Santana
- Carson Daly
- Chino Moreno
- Chuck Billy
- Dave Mustaine
- Dru Down
- Denzel Curry
- Eazy E
- Eddie Van Halen
- Fieldy
- Fred Durst
- Gabriel Iglesias
- George Lopez
- Tiny Lister
- Guy Fieri
- Hunter S. Thompson
- Ice Cube
- Ice T
- Ivan Moody
- James Garner
- James Hetfield
- Jeff Hanneman
- Joe Satriani
- Josephine Skriver
- Keak da Sneak
- Kerry King
- Lil Jon
- Lars Frederiksen
- MC Hammer
- MC Ren
- Mike Tyson
- Mac Dre
- Mick Thomson
- Michelle Williams
- Richie Rich
- Naya Rivera
- Neal Schon
- Robb Flynn
- Ronda Rousey
- Sen Dog
- Spice 1
- SpaceGhostPurrp
- Shannon Larkin
- Shavo Odadjian
- Snow Tha Product
- Steve Aoki
- Tiger Woods
- Tom Hanks
- Jimena Sánchez
- Vanessa Hudgens
- Too Short
- Treach
- Terence Crawford
- Tyson Fury
- Tommy Shaw
- Zoltan Bathory
- Yukmouth
- Jay Briscoe

== See also ==
- Mob Squad
- 49er Faithful
- 12s
- Bills Mafia
- Steeler Nation
- Cheesehead
- Red Sox Nation
- Yankees Universe
- Cardinal Nation
