= Audrey Sabol =

U.S. art collector

Audrey Sabol c. 1965

Audrey Sabol (1922 – September 4, 2021) was an entrepreneur, curator, and art collector. She was best known for suggesting to Ed Ruscha that his images of gasoline stations would be a good subject for a fine art print. She published the iconic image Standard Station in 1966.

Sabol was married to Ed Sabol (1916–2015) the founder of Blair Motion Pictures. In 1962 Sabol joined the Fine Arts Committee of the Arts Council of the Young Men's and Young Women's Hebrew Association in Philadelphia. She went on to establish the Beautiful Bag Co., the Durable Dish Co., and the Rare Ring Co. with fellow Pop art enthusiast Joan Kron. In 1967 she was involved with the YM/YWHA sponsored Museum of Merchandise exhibition in Philadelphia.

Her papers are in the Archives of American Art. She was interviewed for the Archives' Oral History Program in 1987.
