= Takuji Nakamura =

Japanese painter

- Born: 1 April 1897; Aikawa, Japan
- Died: 31 January 1988 (aged 90); Kanazawa, Japan
- Occupation: Painter

Takuji Nakamura (1 April 1897 – 31 January 1988) was a Japanese painter. His work was part of the painting event in the art competition at the 1936 Summer Olympics.
