= Pete Rozelle Radio-Television Award =

American football award

The Pete Rozelle Radio-Television Award, created in 1989 and named for the late longtime NFL commissioner, Pete Rozelle, is bestowed annually by the Pro Football Hall of Fame "for longtime exceptional contributions to radio and television in professional football". In contrast to similar awards given by other American professional sports leagues, the Rozelle Award has occasionally been granted to broadcast executives and production people in addition to on-air personalities. Also, some award winners have gone on to be inducted by the hall at a later date.

== Rozelle Award recipients ==
Year	Honoree	Primary affiliation(s)
1989	Bill MacPhail	Executive: CBS
1990	Lindsey Nelson	Play-by-play: CBS
1991	Ed Sabol	Founder and executive: NFL Films
1992	Chris Schenkel	Play-by-play: DuMont, CBS, NBC
1993	Curt Gowdy	Play-by-play: NBC, CBS
1994	Pat Summerall	Color commentator and play-by-play: CBS, Fox
1995	Frank Gifford	Color commentator and play-by-play: CBS, ABC
1996	Jack Buck	Play-by-play: CBS, NBC, CBS Radio
1997	Charlie Jones	Play-by-play: ABC, NBC
1998	Val Pinchbeck	NFL broadcast official
1999	Dick Enberg	Play-by-play: NBC, CBS
2000	Ray Scott	Play-by-play: DuMont, CBS
2001	Roone Arledge	Executive: ABC
2002	John Madden	Color commentator: CBS, Fox, ABC, NBC
2003	Don Criqui	Play-by-play: CBS, NBC
2004	Van Miller	Play-by-play: Buffalo Bills
2005	Myron Cope	Color commentator: Pittsburgh Steelers
2006	Lesley Visser	Reporter: CBS, ABC
2007	Don Meredith	Color commentator: ABC, NBC
2008	Dan Dierdorf	Color commentator: CBS, ABC
2009	Irv Cross	Color commentator and studio analyst: CBS
2010	Chris Berman	Studio host: ESPN
2011	Jim Nantz	Studio host and play-by-play: CBS Radio, CBS
2012	Len Dawson	Studio host and color commentator: HBO, NBC, KMBC-TV, Kansas City Chiefs
2013	Al Michaels	Play-by-play: ABC, NBC, Amazon Prime
2014	Bob Trumpy	Color commentator: NBC, Westwood One
2015	Tom Jackson	Studio analyst: ESPN
2016	James Brown	Studio host and play-by-play: CBS, Fox
2017	David Hill	Executive: Fox
2018	Andrea Kremer	Reporter: NFL Films, ESPN, NBC, NFL Network, Amazon Prime
2019	Dick Ebersol	Executive: NBC
2020	Joe Buck	Play-by-play: Fox, ESPN
2021	John Facenda	Broadcaster and narrator: NFL Films
2022	Howard Katz	Executive: ABC, ESPN, NFL Films
2023	Fred Gaudelli	Producer: ABC, NBC, Amazon Prime
2024	Merrill Reese	Play-by-play: Philadelphia Eagles
2025	Brent Musburger	Play-by-play, studio: CBS, ABC
2026	Sandy Grossman	Director: CBS, Fox

== See also ==
- List of current National Football League broadcasters
- Curt Gowdy Media Award - the NBA's comparable award
- Ford C. Frick Award - MLB's comparable award
- Foster Hewitt Memorial Award - the NHL's comparable award
- Bill Nunn Award
