= Steve Sabol =

American filmmaker and founder of NFL Films (1942–2012)

- Sabol in 1998
- Born: Stephen Douglas Sabol; October 2, 1942; Moorestown, New Jersey, U.S.
- Died: September 18, 2012 (aged 69); Moorestown, New Jersey, U.S.
- Occupations: Sports filmmaker; narrator; cameraman; entrepreneur; artist; co-founder of NFL Films with father Ed Sabol; Pro Football Hall of Fame 2020 Class
- Years active: 1962–2012
- Spouse(s): Lisa (divorced; 1 child); Penny
- Parent(s): Ed Sabol (1916–2015); Audrey Sabol

Stephen Douglas Sabol (October 2, 1942 – September 18, 2012) was an American filmmaker. He was the president and one of the founders of NFL Films, along with his father Ed. He was also a widely exhibited visual artist. He was inducted into the Pro Football Hall of Fame in 2020, due to his works with NFL Films.

== Early life ==
Sabol was born in Moorestown, New Jersey, the son of film-maker Ed Sabol and art collector Audrey Sabol. He attended Colorado College, where he majored in art history and was an All-Rocky Mountain Conference in football as a running back and was a member of Kappa Sigma fraternity.

He was the subject of a humorous article about his self-promotion exploits in the November 22, 1965, issue of Sports Illustrated.

== Career ==
After graduation, he began his career in 1964 as a cameraman alongside his father Ed Sabol (1916–2015) when his father got the filming rights to the 1962 NFL Championship Game, played in Yankee Stadium. With his degree in art history and experience playing football, Sabol was, as his father put it, "uniquely qualified to make football movies."

This company eventually grew into NFL Films, with Sabol serving mainly as a cameraman, editor, and writer in the 1960s and 1970s. When ESPN was founded in 1979, they soon signed NFL Films as a production company and Sabol became an on-air personality in the 1980s. He won 35 Emmy Awards and was featured in an episode of 60 Minutes Sports. Sabol played a part in founding the NFL Network.

In 1985, Sabol took over NFL Films from his father, Ed Sabol. NFL Films was the first company to wire coaches and players for sound as well as the first to use slow motion and montage editing in sports. The Broadcast Pioneers of Philadelphia inducted Sabol into their Hall of Fame in 1996.

In March 2011, NFL Films was recognized with the Lamar Hunt Award for Professional Football.

== Awards and recognitions ==
Sabol was named the 2002 Sports Executive of the Year by Sporting News magazine. Sabol also received the Pete Rozelle Award, which is presented each year to someone who has made an outstanding contribution to the National Football League and to professional football.

Sabol and his father, Ed, were honored in 2003 with the Lifetime Achievement Emmy from the National Academy of Television Arts and Sciences for "revolutionizing the way America watches football and setting the standard in sports filmmaking."

In 2007, the Pro Football Hall of Fame honored Sabol with the Dan Reeves Pioneer Award. Sabol was the recipient of the 2010 Sports Leadership Award presented to him at the March of Dimes 27th Annual Sports Luncheon.

Both Sabol and his father were elected to the Pro Football Hall of Fame on February 5, 2011 They were inducted into the Philadelphia Sports Hall of Fame in November 2011, which was followed by Sabol's induction into the Sports Broadcasting Hall of Fame in December.

Sabol received the Sports Business Journal's "Champions – Pioneers & Innovators in Sports Business" award in March 2012.

Sabol won over 40 Emmys during his time with NFL Films.

== Personal life ==
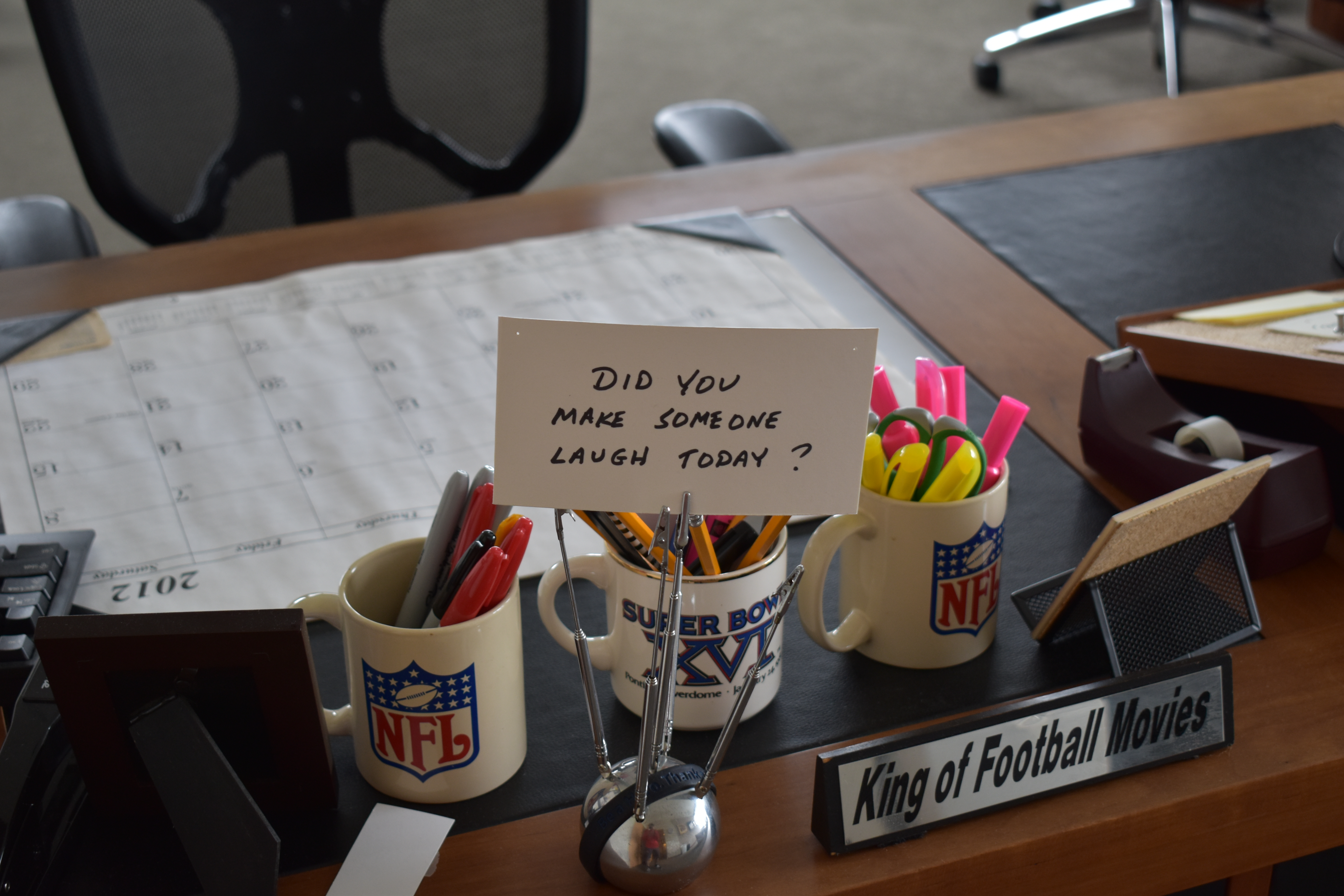
Sabol's desk in his office at NFL Films, which has been left untouched since his death.

Sabol was married for over a decade to his first wife, Lisa, mother of his only son, Casey Sabol. After their divorce, Lisa married John DeBella. Sabol then married his second wife, Penny Sabol. He was of Romanian descent.

Sabol was the author of the poem "The Autumn Wind", later adopted by the Oakland Raiders as an unofficial anthem.

=== Death and legacy ===
On September 18, 2012, Sabol died of brain cancer in Moorestown, New Jersey, 18 months after being diagnosed with an inoperable brain tumor in March 2011. He died at age 69, a week after his father's (Ed Sabol) 96th birthday. He was honored before every NFL game in week 3 with a video tribute.

The NFL paid tribute to his life and contributions to the league, at a ceremony on February 12, 2013, in Philadelphia.

On January 15, 2020, Sabol was elected to the Pro Football Hall of Fame Class of 2020.
