= Howard Katz =

American sports executive (born 1949)

Howard Katz (born November 30, 1949) is an American sports executive, best known for his work as the Senior Vice President of Broadcasting & Media Operations for the NFL.

== Career ==
Raised in Livingston, New Jersey, Katz majored in economics and graduated from Colgate University in 1971, where he successfully directed the press room for the college hockey championships while serving as assistant to the university's sports information director. began his career as a production associate for ABC Sports in 1971, where he worked on the 1972 Summer Olympics in Munich, Germany, Monday Night Football, and Wide World of Sports. From 1971 to 1993, Katz worked at Trans World International (the television arm of IMG Media) and as president of Ohlmeyer Communications Company (OCC), which was bought out by ESPN in 1993.

While at ESPN, Katz helped launch ESPN2 in 1993, and was promoted to executive vice president of production. In 2002, he hired John Madden to announce Monday Night Football for ABC. He also helped to launch ESPNews, ESPN Radio, ESPN International, ESPN Classic and the ESPY Awards.

In 2003, Katz joined NFL Films, and the same year he began the "flexible scheduling" model currently used by the NFL, which allows the league to move matchups to and from primetime to maximize visibility. He also played a role in the rise of streaming services carrying games, especially Amazon Prime. Katz retired from the NFL in 2025, having been employed with the league for 22 years.

== Awards and honors ==
In 2022, Katz was named the winner of the Pete Rozelle Radio-Television Award from the Pro Football Hall of Fame.
