= Gunnar Christensen (footballer) =

Norwegian footballer (1905-1988)

Personal information
- Date of birth: 27 August 1905
- Place of birth: Skien, Norway
- Date of death: 18 January 1988 (aged 82)
- Position: Goalkeeper

International career
Years	Team	Apps	(Gls)
1927–1928	Norway	9	(0)

Gunnar Christensen (27 August 1905 – 18 January 1988) was a Norwegian footballer. He played in nine matches for the Norway national football team from 1927 to 1928.
