= Red Sox Nation =

Fans of the Boston Red Sox baseball team

Red Sox Nation (RSN) is a term used for fans of the Boston Red Sox. The phrase was coined by the Boston Globe feature writer Nathan Cobb in an October 20, 1986, article about split allegiances among fans in Connecticut during the 1986 World Series between the Red Sox and the New York Mets.

== Red Sox fandom ==
Red Sox fans were once described by Dennis Eckersley as the "ultimate manic-depressive fanbase." For all the excitement over the quality of play by the Red Sox, there is often a twinge of pessimism about the team, as the team's failures are typically blown out of proportion. Boston Globe columnist Charlie Pierce, among others, has attributed the self-perpetuating fatalism of the Nation to the intellectual legacy of the Puritans who settled Boston and instilled in the region's inhabitants a deep-seated Calvinist determinism. In 2010, Forbes rated Red Sox Nation as the best fans in American sports, citing points such as road attendance and overall devotion to the team. However, in 2011 GQ magazine also ranked Red Sox fans the sixth-worst in the United States and second-worst in Major League Baseball―behind only the Philadelphia Phillies―labeling them "insufferable hypocrites".

== "Official" Red Sox Nation ==
In 2004, the Boston Red Sox began offering official citizenship in Red Sox Nation. For a small fee, fans received a membership card with the words "Official Red Sox Nation Citizen" and access to additional Red Sox merchandise offers and newsletters.

=== President ===
In the summer of 2007, the Red Sox fan site on MLB.com offered "official" citizens of RSN the chance to register as candidates to become the first president of Red Sox Nation, for the 2008 season. A broad field of self-proclaimed candidates was whittled down (internally, by operators of the website) to 25, then an open-to-all online "primary" was held in August that resulted in 10 final candidates. For most of September, the ten were provided with weblogs on the website to mount their campaigns. On September 27, Tim Russert of NBC moderated a debate among six of the candidates in a hall at Boston University (three were no-shows, and Doris Kearns Goodwin withdrew from the race). The final election, also open to the public at the same website, was held from September 28 through October 2, 2007. The winner was Jerry Remy, a former Red Sox player and then broadcast color commentator. The following day, Remy threw out the first pitch in the opening game of the Red Sox' playoff series.

=== Governors ===
Following Jerry Remy's election as president of Red Sox Nation, he and his vice president "Regular Rob" Crawford developed a "Red Sox Nation Five-Point Plan" to guide their first year in office. The first point of the plan called for the creation of governors to represent members of Red Sox Nation in their home states. Beginning with the six New England states, nominations were accepted through redsox.com, and from these nominations the president and vice president appointed representatives for each state. Governors were responsible for better connecting members of Red Sox Nation within their home state to the team, as well as organizing viewing parties for Red Sox Nation members in their states and collecting feedback from their constituency. Since its inaugural season, the Governor's program has thus been disbanded.

== See also ==
- Pantone 294
- BLOHARDS
- Cardinal Nation
- Royal Rooters
- Steeler Nation
- Raider Nation
- Dennis Drinkwater
