= Harold Matson =

American literary agent (1898–1988)

- Born: February 26, 1898; Grand Rapids, Michigan, U.S.
- Died: January 5, 1988 (aged 89)
- Occupation: Literary agent

Harold Matson (February 26, 1898 – January 5, 1988) was an American literary agent and founder of the Harold Matson Company. His clients included Evelyn Waugh, C. S. Forester, Arthur Koestler, Malcolm Lowry, William Saroyan, Allen Drury, Robert Ruark, Herman Wouk, Evan S. Connell, Flannery O'Connor and Richard Condon.

== Early life ==
Matson was born in Grand Rapids, Michigan and grew up in San Francisco.

== Career ==
The New York Times called Matson "one of the most influential figures in book publishing." The $106,000 sale of the paperback rights to Robert Ruark's novel Something of Value set a record at the time. On his death, Ruark left his Rolls-Royce car to Matson.

== Archives ==
- Harold Matson Company Inc. records, 1937-1980
