= Baseball broadcasting firsts =

Notable firsts in the broadcast history of baseball

== 1920s ==
On August 5, 1921, the first Major League Baseball game was broadcast on the radio by Harold Arlin. Harold Arlin was an engineer for Westinghouse Electric in Pittsburgh, Pennsylvania. Arlin was offered an announcer's job for the KDKA radio station. At the time, this was one of the few radio stations in the country. In 1920, Arlin was asked to read the returns from that year's presidential race. His work in the early 1920s led him to getting a full-time job as an announcer on the radio.

Arlin was just 25 years old when he called the action from a box seat at Forbes Field. The game that was played was between the Pittsburgh Pirates and the Philadelphia Phillies which ended in an 8–5 Pirates victory. To call the game, he used a converted telephone as a microphone. Arlin worked for Westinghouse's KDKA, which was the first commercial radio station in the United States.

Arlin soon helped sports broadcasting to become a sensation. Fans were so interested in Arlin's broadcasts that record numbers of fans began traveling to Forbes Field to watch the games. The radio soon became an essential tool for sports fans all over the world. When teams had home games, stores and shops would mount loudspeakers outside so listeners could experience the game on their own time.

As the radio developed throughout the 1920s, networks like CBS and NBC established its versatility by their ability to broadcast to an audience.

== 1930s ==
The majority of the leagues' teams were reluctant to the idea of broadcasting their games. They all feared that fans would rather listen to the game on the radio than go to the ballpark. The fear was so overpowering that radio broadcasting was within one or two votes from being permanently banned.

The first-ever televised baseball game aired on May 17, 1939, between Princeton and Columbia. Princeton beat Columbia 2–1 at Columbia's Baker Field. The game was aired on NBC station W2XBS. At the time, this was NBC's experimental station located in New York City, which would ultimately become WNBC. The game was announced by Bill Stern.

On August 26 of the same year, the first ever Major League Baseball game was televised once again on W2XBS. With Red Barber announcing, the Brooklyn Dodgers and the Cincinnati Reds played a doubleheader at Ebbets Field. The Reds won the first game 5–2, while the Dodgers won the second game 6–1. Barber called the game without the benefit of a monitor and with only two cameras capturing the game. One camera was placed behind home plate, in the second tier of seating, while another was positioned near the visitors' dugout, on the third-base side.

Later that year, Major League Baseball announced that all 16 major league teams were on the radio.

== 1940s ==
During the Golden Age of Radio, televised sports was something not many people were familiar with. At this time, the radio was still the main form of broadcasting baseball games. Many notable and famous broadcasters such as, Vin Scully, Red Barber, Harry Caray, Ernie Harwell, and Mel Allen.

By 1947, television sets were selling almost as fast as they could be produced. For this reason, Major League Baseball teams began televising games which attracted a whole new audience to the ballparks. Casual fans who only rarely followed baseball began going to the games in person and enjoyed themselves. As a result, Major League Baseball's attendance reached a record high of 21 million just a year later.

In 1947, The World Series was televised for the first time ever. The games were shown in on NBC over their WNBT channel (now WNBC). The broadcast was sponsored by Gillette and Ford. With only about 100,000 television sets in the country at the time, the 1947 World Series brought in an estimated 3.9 million viewers. Many fans watched the action unfold from bars and other public places. This soon became television's first mass audience.

On April 16, 1948, Chicago's WGN-TV (run by Jake Israel) broadcast its first big-league game. Jack Brickhouse called the Chicago White Sox' 4–1 victory over the Chicago Cubs in an exhibition game at Wrigley Field. WGN televised each Cubs and White Sox home game live. According to Brickhouse,

"It worked because the Cubs and White Sox weren't home at the same time. You aired the Sox at Comiskey, or Cubs at Wrigley Field. Daytime scheduling gave the Cubs a decided edge, as Wrigley didn't have lights, so kids came home from school, had a sandwich, and turned the TV on."

== 1950s ==
On July 11, 1950, the All-Star Game was televised for the first time from Chicago's Comiskey Park. On November 8, 1950, Commissioner Happy Chandler and player reps agreed on the split of the TV-radio rights from the World Series.

On August 11, 1951, WCBS-TV in New York City televised the first baseball game in color using its field-sequential color system. In this game, fans saw the Boston Braves beat the Brooklyn Dodgers by the score of 8–4.

On October 1 of that year, NBC aired the first coast-to-coast baseball telecast. The Brooklyn Dodgers were beaten 3-1 by the New York Giants in a tiebreaker game of a playoff series. It was in this game in which Giant's third baseman, Bobby Thomson hit his famous game-winning home run. This clutch home run would later be named the “Shot Heard ’Round the World”.

NBC added another first in 1955, when they televised that year's World Series entirely in compatible electronic color. The Dodgers defeated the Yankees that season for their only championship while they were based in Brooklyn.

In 1958, KTTV in Los Angeles, California, aired the first regular-season baseball game ever played on the West Coast, a Los Angeles Dodgers-San Francisco Giants game from Seals Stadium in San Francisco, California, with Vin Scully announcing. In its first year airing Major League Baseball, KTTV aired only the Dodgers' road games.

What may be the first sports instant replay using videotape occurred on July 17, 1959, during a broadcast of a New York Yankees game by New York TV station WPIX. It came after a hit by Jim McAnany of the Chicago White Sox ended a no-hitter by the Yankees' Ralph Terry. Since the game was being videotaped, broadcaster Mel Allen asked director Terry Murphy to play a tape of McAnany's hit over the air.

== 1960s ==
On July 23, 1962, Major League Baseball had its first satellite telecast (via Telstar Communications). The telecast included portion of a contest between the Chicago Cubs vs. the Philadelphia Phillies from Wrigley Field with Jack Brickhouse commentating.

On July 17, 1964, a game out of Los Angeles between the Chicago Cubs and Los Angeles Dodgers became the first Pay TV baseball game. Basically, subscription television offered the cablecast to subscribers for money. The Dodgers beat the Cubs by the score of 3–2, with Don Drysdale collecting 10 strikeouts along the way.

On March 17, 1965, Jackie Robinson became the first black network (ABC) broadcaster for Major League Baseball. That year, ABC provided the first-ever nationwide baseball coverage with weekly Saturday broadcasts on a regional basis. Some time later, Bill White became the first black man to regularly do play-by-play work for Major League Baseball.

== 1970s ==
On October 13, 1971, the World Series held a night game for the first time. Commissioner Bowie Kuhn, who felt that baseball could attract a larger audience by featuring a prime time telecast (as opposed to a mid-afternoon broadcast, when most fans either worked or attended school), pitched the idea to NBC. An estimated 61 million people watched Game 4 on NBC; television ratings for a World Series game during the daytime hours would not have approached such a record number. In subsequent years, all weekday games would be played at night.

Except for Game 1 in both series, all League Championship Series games in 1975 were regionally televised. Meanwhile, Game 3 of both League Championship Series were aired in prime time, the first time such an occurrence happened.

On October 18, 1977, ABC's Bill White became the first African American broadcaster to preside over the presentation of the Commissioner's Trophy at the conclusion of the World Series.

== 1980s ==
In 1985, NBC's telecast of the All-Star Game out of the Metrodome in Minnesota was the first program to be broadcast in stereo by a television network. Also in 1985, ABC announced that every game of the World Series would be played under the lights for the biggest baseball audience possible. It marked the first time that all World Series games were played at night.

In 1989, NBC's Gayle Gardner became the first woman to regularly host Major League Baseball games for a major television network.

== 1990s ==
In 1990, CBS Sports' Lesley Visser became the first female to cover the World Series, serving as their lead field reporter. In addition to working the World Series from 1990-1993 for CBS, Visser covered the 1995 World Series for ABC Sports via The Baseball Network.

On August 3, 1993, Gayle Gardner became the first woman to do television play-by-play for a Major League Baseball game. It was the Colorado Rockies versus the Cincinnati Reds on KWGN-TV in Denver.

Also in 1993, CBS' Andrea Joyce became the first woman to co-host the network television coverage of the World Series. Joyce co-hosted that particular World Series with Pat O'Brien.

On October 2, 1995, ESPN televised the first tie-breaker playoff game on cable television. Jon Miller and Joe Morgan called the game from Seattle's Kingdome between the Seattle Mariners and California Angels.

In 1995, NBC's Hannah Storm not only became the first woman to serve as solo host a World Series game, but also the first woman to preside over the World Series Trophy presentation.

In 1996, ESPN began a five-year contract with Major League Baseball worth $440 million and about $80 million per year. ESPN paid for the rights to a Wednesday doubleheader and the Sunday night Game of the Week, as well as all postseason games not aired on Fox or NBC. As a result, Major League Baseball postseason games were aired on cable for the very first time.

On July 8, 1997, Fox televised its first ever All-Star Game (out of Jacobs Field in Cleveland). For this particular game, Fox introduced "Catcher-Cam" in which a camera was affixed to catchers' masks in order to provide unique perspectives of the action around home plate. Catcher-Cam soon would become a regular fixture in Fox's baseball broadcasts.

On March 31, 1998, NBC affiliate KXAS presented the first non-experimental high-definition broadcast of a regular-season game, an Opening Day contest between the Chicago White Sox and the Texas Rangers. The White Sox prevailed that day, defeating the Rangers 8–1.

== 2000s ==
2001 marked first year of split coverage of one League Championship Series game as well as the first cable involvement in LCS. Game 5 of the NLCS and Game 4 of the ALCS were split between the Fox Broadcasting Company and Fox Sports Net. 2001 also featured the first cable Division Series game to be aired in prime time.

The 2002 World Series, broadcast on Fox, was the first World Series to be broadcast in high-definition.

With TBS acquiring rights to air one half of the League Championship Series (the other half going to Fox), 2007 marked the first time that an LCS was broadcast exclusively on cable. It also marked the first time that cable television produced postseason games weren't available on over-the-air television in the participating teams' home markets.

Also in 2007, ESPN2 broadcast the Major League Baseball draft. It was the first time the draft was televised.

2009 was the first time that Baseball Hall of Fame election ceremony was broadcast live, with MLB Network televising the event.

Also in 2009, New York Yankees broadcaster Suzyn Waldman became the first woman to work a World Series game from the broadcast booth.

== 2010s ==
For the first time ever, in 2010, the MLB season opener was televised live in China over five broadcasters reaching nearly 300 million fans. The game was played on April 4, 2010, between the Boston Red Sox and the reigning World Series champion New York Yankees.

On August 24, 2015, Jessica Mendoza was the first female analyst for a Major League Baseball game in the history of ESPN, during a game between the St. Louis Cardinals and the Arizona Diamondbacks. On August 30, 2015, Mendoza filled in for suspended color commentator Curt Schilling for the Cubs-Dodgers game on Sunday Night Baseball. Cubs pitcher Jake Arrieta pitched a no hitter in the game. John Kruk, Dan Shulman and Mendoza called the 2015 American League Wild Card Game on October 6, and Mendoza became the first female analyst in MLB postseason history.

== 2020s ==
ESPN began broadcasting KBO League games in May 2020, as the MLB season was delayed and shortened due to the COVID-19 pandemic.

On May 13, 2021, Major League Baseball extended their deal with ESPN through the year 2028. The agreement began at the start of the 2022 season. With this agreement, ESPN will televise 30 regular season games for the next 6 years. In addition, ESPN will air the annual Home Run Derby and up to 10 spring training games.

On July 20, 2021, Melanie Newman was the play-by-play announcer as part of the first all-female broadcast team, who called the Baltimore Orioles vs. Tampa Bay Rays game for YouTube.

On September 29, 2021, ESPN aired the first nationally televised Major League Baseball broadcast to be called entirely by women. Melanie Newman and Jessica Mendoza called the game in Los Angeles between the Los Angeles Dodgers and San Diego Padres.

== Sources ==
- Sportscasting Firsts, 1920 - Present
- Home > Index > Broadcast Firsts > Sports
- Searchable Network TV Broadcasts
