= Young Mac of Fort Vancouver =

1940 children's book by Mary Jane Carr

- Author: Mary Jane Carr
- Illustrator: Richard Holberg
- Language: English
- Genre: Children's literature
- Publisher: Crowell
- Publication date: 1940
- Publication place: United States

Young Mac of Fort Vancouver is a 1940 children's historical fiction novel written by Mary Jane Carr and illustrated by Richard Holberg. Set in 1832, it recounts the adventures of Donald "Mac" McDermott, a young mixed-blood fur trader. Mac's father's dying wish was for Mac to receive an education from Dr. McLoughlin in Fort Vancouver along the Columbia River. At the fort, Mac is injured after a horse he is riding trips. He is taken to Three Gulls, a medicine man, where he recovers. Three Gulls dies of the plague, and the other indians in the village capture him, blaming him for the death. Mac escapes with the help of Yellow Bird and returns to the fort. Later, he travels to Quebec to locate his grandfather, and Mac moves to Edinburgh to study medicine, returning to the fort ten years later.

Carr spent three years researching in preparation to write the book. In their March review in 1941, the Oregon Historical Society said the book was "so authentic that so far none of its facts have been challenged". Pacific Northwest Quarterly called the book "a specimen of fiction so properly set in historical background as to convey a feeling of reality."

The novel was a Newbery Honor recipient in 1941.
