= Ed Cooke (Australian footballer) =

Australian rules footballer, born 1910

Personal information
- Full name: Edward William Joseph Cooke
- Born: 31 March 1910; North Fitzroy, Victoria
- Died: 4 January 1988 (aged 77); Blairgowrie, Victoria
- Original team: Vermont

Playing career^{1}
Years	Club	Games (Goals)
1929–30, 1932	North Melbourne	11 (10)
- ^{1} Playing statistics correct to the end of 1932.

Edward William Joseph Cooke (31 March 1910 – 4 January 1988) was an Australian rules footballer who played with North Melbourne in the Victorian Football League (VFL).
