= James Adams (cricketer, born 1904) =

Australian cricketer

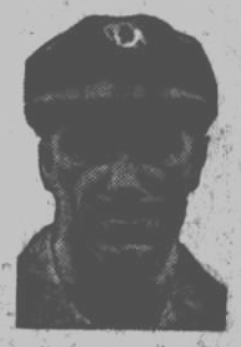

Personal information
- Full name: James Adams
- Born: 22 February 1904; Toowong, Brisbane, Queensland
- Died: 8 January 1988 (aged 83); Willoughby, New South Wales
- Batting: Left-handed

Career statistics
Competition	First-class
Matches	1
Runs scored	25
Batting average	12.5
100s/50s	0/0
Top score	16
Catches/stumpings	1/0
- Source: ESPNCricinfo, 2 June 2017

James Adams (22 February 1904 – 8 January 1988) was an Australian cricketer, who played once for Queensland in first-class cricket.

As of the early 1930s Adams was playing for Western Suburbs in the Brisbane Grade Cricket competition as an opening batsman. He performed well in the 1930-31 grade cricket season scoring two centuries. He was selected in the Queensland state side in January 1931 due to a dispute between the State selectors and some Queensland players leaving a vacancy in the side.

In January 1931 he made his First-class debut for Queensland playing in a tour game against the West Indies Test side. He batted at third in Queensland's first innings scoring 16 and opened in the second innings scoring 9. He was selected to represent Queensland again in February for a Sheffield Shield game against Victoria in Brisbane but the match was abandoned without a ball bowled.

A 1934 report noted that after several successful seasons Adams was performing poorly with the bat. He had been dropped from the Western Suburbs A grade team by 1936 but was recalled in February that year, and continued playing up until at least 1938.
