= Richard Mitchell (cricketer, born 1913) =

Trinidadian cricketer

Personal information
- Full name: Richard William Gordon Lewis Mitchell
- Born: 27 February 1913; British Grenada
- Died: 13 January 1988 (aged 74); Port of Spain, Trinidad and Tobago
- Batting: Right-handed
- Bowling: Right-arm fast medium

Domestic team information
- Years: Team
- 1935: Oxford University

Career statistics
Competition	First-class
Matches	3
Runs scored	58
Batting average	29.00
100s/50s	–/–
Top score	30*
Catches/stumpings	–/–
- Source: Cricinfo, 4 July 2020

Richard William Gordon Lewis Mitchell (27 February 1913 – 13 January 1988) was a Grenadian-born Trinidadian first-class cricketer.

Born on the Caribbean island of Grenada in February 1913, Mitchell later studied in England at Keble College at the University of Oxford. While studying at Oxford, he made a single appearance in first-class cricket for Oxford University against a combined Minor Counties cricket team at Oxford in 1935. Returning to the Caribbean after graduating from Oxford, later playing two first-class matches against British Guinea in 1938 for a team led by Rolph Grant. Grant later moved to Trinidad where he died at Port of Spain in January 1988.
