= Ed Sabol =

American filmmaker and founder of NFL Films (1916–2015)

- Born: Edwin Milton Sabol; September 11, 1916; Atlantic City, New Jersey, U.S.
- Died: February 9, 2015 (aged 98); Scottsdale, Arizona, U.S.
- Education: Ohio State University
- Occupation: Founder of NFL Films
- Spouse: Audrey Sabol
- Children: Steve Sabol
- Awards: Awards and honors

Edwin Milton Sabol (September 11, 1916 – February 9, 2015) was an American filmmaker and the founder (with his son Steve Sabol, among others) of NFL Films. He was inducted into the Pro Football Hall of Fame in 2011 as a contributor, due to his works with NFL Films.

== Early life, education, and career ==
Sabol was born to a Jewish mother and Romanian father in Atlantic City, New Jersey in 1916 and raised in Blairstown, New Jersey. While attending Blair Academy, he excelled in several sports, and set a World Interscholastic Swimming record in the 100-yard freestyle race. He continued his noted swimming career at Ohio State University. He was selected for the 1936 Olympic team but refused to participate because of the games being held in Nazi Germany. He had some success in the theater as an actor, appearing on Broadway for the production of Where Do We Go from Here. He served in World War II, and upon returning to civilian life, worked as a clothing salesman out of his father-in-law's factory.

== NFL Films ==
Sabol founded Blair Motion Pictures in 1962. Its first major contract was to film the 1962 NFL Championship Game between the New York Giants and the Green Bay Packers at Yankee Stadium in New York.

In 1964, Blair Motion Pictures became NFL Films, with an exclusive deal to preserve NFL games on film. It has been said by his son Steve Sabol, of NFL Films, "The only other human endeavor more thoroughly captured on 16-mm film than the National Football League is World War II." In 1995, he officially retired from NFL Films in his role as president and chairman. In 1996, he was elected to the International Jewish Sports Hall of Fame.

On February 5, 2011, Sabol was elected to the Pro Football Hall of Fame in Canton, Ohio.

== Death ==
Sabol died on February 9, 2015, at his home in Arizona.

== Awards and honors ==
- 1935: World Interscholastic Record holder, 100-yard freestyle swimming
- 1937: Big Ten championship, 400-yard freestyle relay swimming
- 1937: National AAU championship, 400-yard freestyle relay swimming
- 91 Emmy Awards (to NFL Films)
- 1987: Order of the Leather Helmet (presented by the NFL Alumni Association)
- 1987: Bert Bell Memorial Award (presented by the NFL)
- 1991: Pete Rozelle Award (presented by the NFL)
- 1996: International Jewish Sports Hall of Fame
- 1998: Philadelphia Jewish Sports Hall of Fame
- 2003: Lifetime Achievement Emmy
- 2004: John Grierson International Gold Medal
- 2011: Pro Football Hall of Fame
