= Vincent McMahon (cricketer) =

Australian cricketer

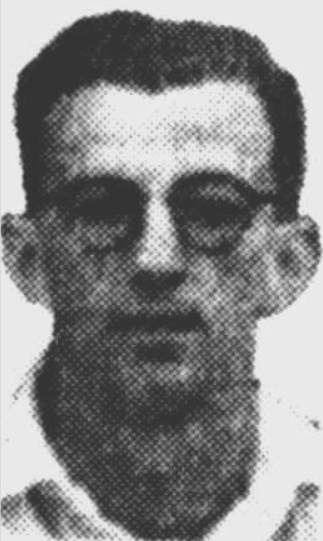

Personal information
- Born: 18 January 1918; Chinchilla, Queensland, Australia
- Died: 23 January 1988 (aged 70); Brisbane, Queensland, Australia
- Source: Cricinfo, 5 October 2020

Vincent McMahon (18 January 1918 – 23 January 1988) was an Australian cricketer. He played in one first-class match for Queensland in 1946/47. McMahon was a right-hand fast-medium swing bowler who could move the ball both ways. He began his cricket career playing for St. Lawrence's Christian Brother's College playing well in warehouse cricket and he made his A grade debut for University in the 1940/41 season.

== See also ==
- List of Queensland first-class cricketers
