= NFL Alumni =

Organization of former NFL players

The NFL Alumni Association is a 501(c)(3) nonprofit organization composed of former National Football League (NFL) players, coaches, team staff members, and associate members who work voluntarily to raise funds for youth-oriented causes and engage in service initiatives to foster the development of "youth through sports and sports through youth."

== History ==
The organization was founded in 1967, but it was revitalized and restructured under the leadership of Vic Maitland, who became its first full-time CEO in 1977.

Maitland, a former player and marketing executive, reorganized the NFL Alumni into a charitable and educational institution and relocated its headquarters to Fort Lauderdale, Florida. He worked for a symbolic salary of $1 per year and personally contributed nearly $1 million to keep the organization afloat during its early years.

Under Maitland's leadership, the NFL Alumni expanded to more than 30 active chapters and launched many signature programs, including:

- The Charity Golf Classic Tour (established in 1979), the cornerstone of its fundraising efforts
- The Player of the Year Awards Dinner (begun in 1982), honoring top players and coaches by votes cast from former players
- The NFL Alumni Ring, a distinctive gold and sapphire piece introduced in the early 1980s
- The NFL Alumni Gold Blazer tradition, first awarded in 1978 to Pro Football Hall of Fame inductees as part of their ceremonial recognition
- The Pro Legends Speakers Bureau, which books retired players for public

The association also awards annually several awards like Player of the Year. It also honors past or current players with its Spirit Award for youth-oriented community service, Order of the Leather Helmet Award for individuals who "have made significant contributions to the game of professional football" and the Career Achievement Award given to those "whose accomplishments on and off the field demonstrate the higher values promoted by the organization.".

== NFL Alumni Player of the Year ==
=== 2011 ===
- Quarterback – Matthew Stafford (Lions)
- Running Back – Maurice Jones-Drew (Jaguars)
- Wide Receiver – Hakeem Nicks (Giants)
- Lineman – Chris Long (Rams)
- Linebacker – Aldon Smith (49ers)
- Defensive Back – Brent Grimes (Falcons)
- Player of the Year – Maurice Jones-Drew (Jaguars)
- Lifetime Achievement – Randall Cunningham

=== 2010 ===
Offense

- Quarterback – Philip Rivers (Chargers)
- Running Back – Maurice Jones-Drew (Jaguars)
- Wide Receiver – Roddy White (Falcons)
- Tight End – Jason Witten (Cowboys)
- Offensive Lineman – Josh Sitton (Packers)

Defense

- Defensive Lineman – Ndamukong Suh (Lions)
- Linebacker – Patrick Willis (49ers)
- Defensive Back – Aqib Talib (Buccaneers)

Special teams

- Special Teams Player – Devin Hester (Bears)

Overall

- Player of the Year – Troy Polamalu (Steelers)

Coach

- Coach – Todd Haley (Chiefs)

=== 2009 ===
Offense

- Quarterback – Drew Brees (Saints)
- Running Back – Chris Johnson (Titans)
- Wide Receiver – Andre Johnson (Texans)
- Tight End – Dallas Clark (Colts)
- Offensive Lineman – Steve Hutchinson (Vikings)

Defense

- Defensive Lineman – Jared Allen (Vikings)
- Pass Rusher – Elvis Dumervil (Broncos)
- Linebacker – Patrick Willis (49ers)
- Defensive Back – Charles Woodson (Packers)

Special teams

- Special Teams Player – Joshua Cribbs (Browns)

Coach

- Coach – Sean Payton (Saints)

=== 2008 ===
Offense

- Quarterback – Peyton Manning (Indianapolis Colts)
- Running Back – Adrian Peterson (Minnesota Vikings)
- Wide Receiver – Andre Johnson(Houston Texans)
- Tight End – Jason Witten (Dallas Cowboys)
- Offensive Lineman – Alan Faneca (New York Jets)

Defense

- Defensive Lineman – Albert Haynesworth (Tennessee Titans)
- Pass Rusher – DeMarcus Ware (Dallas Cowboys)
- Linebacker – James Harrison (Pittsburgh Steelers)
- Defensive Back – Ed Reed (Baltimore Ravens)

Special teams

- Special Teams Player – Leon Washington (New York Jets)

Coach

- Coach – Tony Sparano (Miami Dolphins)

=== 2007 ===
Offense

- Quarterback – Tom Brady (New England Patriots)
- Running Back – Brian Westbrook (Philadelphia Eagles)
- Wide Receiver – Randy Moss (New England Patriots)
- Tight End – Jason Witten (Dallas Cowboys)
- Offensive Lineman – Jeff Saturday (Indianapolis Colts)

Defense

- Defensive Lineman – Mario Williams (Houston Texans)
- Pass Rusher – Jared Allen (Kansas City Chiefs)
- Linebacker – Patrick Willis (San Francisco 49ers)
- Defensive Back – Antonio Cromartie (San Diego Chargers)

Special teams

- Special Teams Player – Devin Hester (Chicago Bears)

Coach

- Coach – Mike McCarthy (Green Bay Packers)

=== 2006 ===
Offense

- Quarterback – Drew Brees (New Orleans Saints)
- Running Back – LaDainian Tomlinson (San Diego Chargers)
- Wide Receiver – Andre Johnson (Houston Texans)
- Tight End – Todd Heap (Baltimore Ravens)
- Offensive Lineman – Steve Hutchinson (Minnesota Vikings)

Defense

- Defensive Lineman – Jason Taylor (Miami Dolphins)
- Pass Rusher – Aaron Kampman (Green Bay Packers)
- Linebacker – Zach Thomas (Miami Dolphins)
- Defensive Back – Champ Bailey (Denver Broncos)

Special teams

- Special Teams Player – Devin Hester (Chicago Bears)

Coach

- Coach – Sean Payton (New Orleans Saints)

== NFL Alumni Order of the Leather Helmet ==
Awarded to individuals who have made significant contributions to the game of professional football.

1978
- Pete Rozelle
- George Halas
- Art Rooney

1979
- Paul Brown
- Red Grange
- Bronko Nagurski

1980
- Don Shula
- Wellington Mara
- Dominic Olejniczak
- Pro Football Hall of Fame

1981
- Lamar Hunt
- Tom Landry

1982
- Bill Bidwill
- Alex Wojciechowicz
- Bud Grant

1983
- F. William Harder
- LeRoy Neiman

1985
- George Preston Marshall
- Weeb Ewbank

1986
- Howard Cosell
- Vince Lombardi
- Vic Maitland

1987
- Ray Scott
- Steve Sabol
- Ed Sabol
- Bert Bell

1988
- Raymond Berry

1989
- Tex Schramm

1990
- Bill Dudley
- Ollie Matson
- Steve Van Buren

1991
- Hugh McElhenny

1992
- Chuck Bednarik
- Art Modell

1993
- Elroy Hirsch
- Marion Motley

1994
- Sid Luckman
- Sammy Baugh

1995
- Otto Graham
- Chuck Noll

1996
- Johnny Unitas
- Curt Gowdy

1997
- Pat Summerall
- Ralph Wilson

1998
- Jim Brown
- Al Davis

1999
- Bobby Mitchell
- Paul Tagliabue

2000
- Len Dawson
- Deacon Jones

2001
- Mike McCormack
- Mel Renfro

2002
- Mel Blount
- Jim Otto
- Jim Tunney

2003
- Tom Flores
- Willie Davis

2004
- Dick Vermeil
- Val Pinchbeck
- Don Weiss

2005
- Larry Wilson
- Joe Greene

2007
- Sonny Jurgensen
- Jack Youngblood

2008
- Eric Dickerson
- John Madden
- Alex Spanos

== NFL Alumni Career Achievement Award ==
Awarded to individuals whose accomplishments on and off the field demonstrate the higher values promoted by the organization.

1981
- Rocky Bleier
- Roger Staubach

1982
- Merlin Olsen
- O. J. Simpson

1983
- George Blanda
- Earl Morrall

1985
- Frank Gifford
- Jack Kemp

1986
- Dan Fortmann
- Ray Nitschke

1987
- Willie Davis
- Don Hutson

1988
- Art Donovan

1989
- Bart Starr

1990
- Nick Buoniconti

1992
- Ken Farragut

1993
- Gino Marchetti

1994
- Byron White

1995
- Alan Page

1996
- Mike Reid

1997
- Jerry Richardson

1998
- Dr. Robert Khayat

1999
- Dr. Ed Sutton

2000
- Paul Salata

2001
- Terry Bradshaw

2002
- Steve Largent

2003
- Fred Dryer

2004
- Bob Griese

2005
- Drew Pearson

2007
- Mike Haynes
