= Pennsylvania Classic =

Golf tournament

Coordinates: 39.802°N 79.540°W

84 Lumber Classic

Tournament information
- Location: Farmington, Pennsylvania
- Established: 2000
- Course: Mystic Rock
- Par: 72
- Length: 7,516 yards (6,873 m)
- Tour: PGA Tour
- Format: Stroke play
- Prize fund: US$4,600,000
- Month played: September
- Final year: 2006

Tournament record score
- Aggregate: 266 J. L. Lewis (2003)
- To par: −22 as above

Final champion
- (United States) Ben Curtis
- Location in the United States Location in Pennsylvania

The Pennsylvania Classic was a golf tournament on the PGA Tour, held from 2000 through 2006 at three different Pennsylvania courses. The event's final title sponsor was lumber company 84 Lumber. The host course from 2003 to 2006 was Mystic Rock near Farmington, designed by Pete Dye and part of the Nemacolin Woodlands Resort, owned by 84 Lumber founder Joseph Hardy.

Before the move to Mystic Rock, it was played outside Philadelphia in 2000 and 2002 at Waynesborough Country Club in Paoli, with the 2001 event at Laurel Valley Golf Club in Ligonier.

The 2001 event was the first PGA Tour tournament staged after the September 11, 2001 attacks; that year's venue, Laurel Valley, was about 40 miles (64 km) west of Shanksville, Pennsylvania, where United Airlines Flight 93 went down. The hole flags used during the tournament were American flags.

Teenager Michelle Wie accepted an invitation by Wie family friend and 84 Lumber owner Joe Hardy to play in the 2006 tournament. It was her sixth attempt to make a cut in a PGA Tour event and third attempt in 2006. It was expected that Wie's involvement would help draw fans to the event. Wie shot 14 over par over the first two rounds, finishing 23 strokes behind the leaders and last among all competitors who completed two rounds.

The 84 Lumber Company announced in April 2006 that it would no longer host the Classic. Hardy's daughter, Maggie, explained the situation as the sponsorship of tournament being unfair to the thousands of 84 Lumber employees who had recently been laid off, and also unnecessary because the purpose of the tournament was to entertain clients — which the company could do at any other golf tournament.

== Winners ==
Year	Winner	Score	To par	Margin of victory	Runner(s)-up	Ref.
84 Lumber Classic
2006	(United States) Ben Curtis	274	−14	2 strokes	(United States) Charles Howell III	
2005	(United States) Jason Gore	274	−14	1 stroke	(Paraguay) Carlos Franco	
2004	(Fiji) Vijay Singh	273	−15	1 stroke	(United States) Stewart Cink	
84 Lumber Classic of Pennsylvania
2003	(United States) J. L. Lewis	266	−22	2 strokes	(Australia) Stuart Appleby (United States) Frank Lickliter (United States) Tim Petrovic	
SEI Pennsylvania Classic
2002	(United States) Dan Forsman	270	−14	1 stroke	(Australia) Robert Allenby (United States) Billy Andrade	
Marconi Pennsylvania Classic
2001	(Australia) Robert Allenby	269	−19	3 strokes	(United States) Rocco Mediate (United States) Larry Mize	
SEI Pennsylvania Classic
2000	(United States) Chris DiMarco	270	−14	6 strokes	(United States) Mark Calcavecchia (United States) Brad Elder (United States) Scott Hoch (United States) Jonathan Kaye (United States) Chris Perry	
