= West Virginia Mountaineers =

Athletic program of West Virginia University

- University: West Virginia University
- Nickname: Mountaineers
- NCAA: Division I
- Conference: Big 12 (primary); Sun Belt (men's soccer); Great America Rifle Conference (rifle)
- Athletic director: Wren Baker
- Location: Morgantown, West Virginia
- Varsity teams: 18
- Football stadium: Milan Puskar Stadium
- Basketball arena: Hope Coliseum
- Baseball stadium: Kendrick Family Ballpark
- Colors: Gold and blue
- Mascot: The Mountaineer
- Fight song: Hail, West Virginia (official); Fight Mountaineers (official); Take Me Home, Country Roads (unofficial)
- Website: wvusports.com

Team NCAA championships
- 22

The West Virginia Mountaineers are the athletic teams that represent West Virginia University in Morgantown, West Virginia. The school is a member of National Collegiate Athletic Association (NCAA) Division I. The Mountaineers have been a member of the Big 12 Conference since 2012. The men's soccer team now competes as an affiliate member in the Sun Belt Conference.

Currently, WVU sponsors seven men's sports, ten women's sports, and one coeducational sport (rifle). Men's golf was the latest sport to be added in the 2015–16 school year.

== Sports sponsored ==
Men's sports	Women's sports
Baseball	Basketball
Basketball	Cross country
Football	Gymnastics
Golf	Rowing
Soccer	Soccer
Swimming & diving	Swimming and diving
Wrestling	Tennis
	Track and field^{†}
	Volleyball
Co-ed sports
Rifle
† – Track and field includes both indoor and outdoor.

=== Football ===
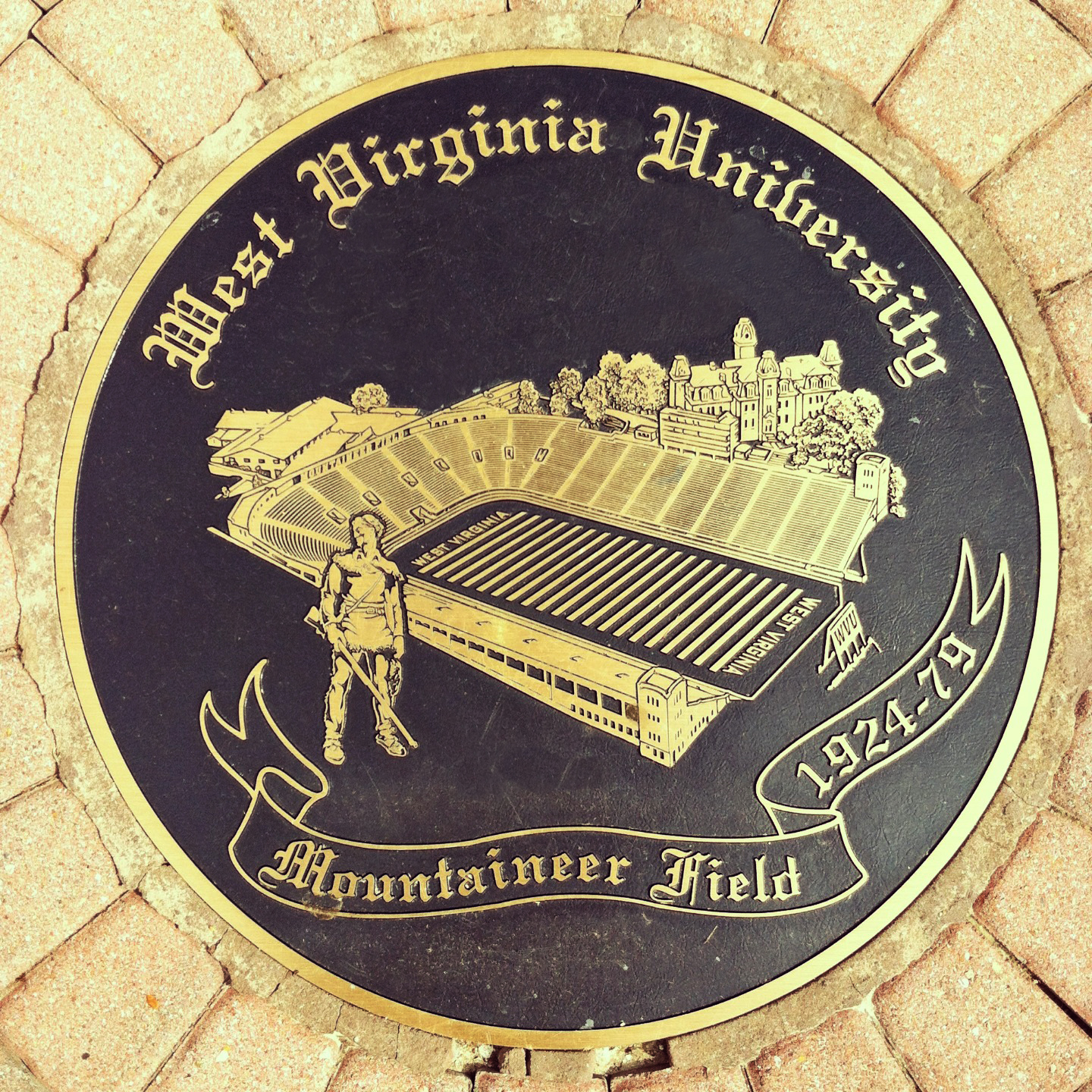
Plaque marking where Mountaineer Field was between 1924 and 1979

Football is the most popular sport at WVU. The West Virginia Mountaineers football team represents West Virginia University in the NCAA Football Bowl Subdivision (FBS) of college football. West Virginia plays its home games at Mountaineer Field at Milan Puskar Stadium on the campus of West Virginia University in Morgantown, West Virginia. The Mountaineers compete in the Big 12 Conference.

With a 787–533–45 record as of the conclusion of the 2024 season, WVU ranks 23rd in victories among NCAA FBS programs. WVU received Division I classification in 1973, becoming a Division I-A program from 1978 to 2006 and an FBS program from 2006 to the present.

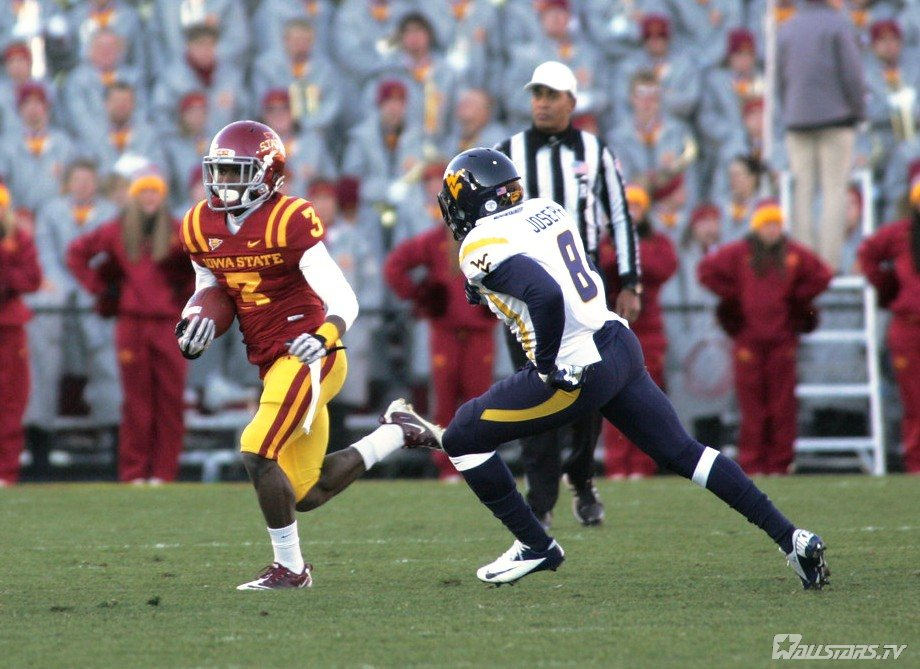
West Virginia v Iowa State game, 2012

The Mountaineers have registered 80 winning seasons in their history, including one unbeaten season (10–0–1 in 1922) and five 11-win seasons (1988, 1993, 2005, 2006, 2007). The Mountaineers have won a total of 15 conference championships, including eight Southern Conference titles and seven Big East Conference titles.

WVU has had two undefeated regular seasons; they went 11–0 in 1988 and 1993. However, West Virginia lost both bowl games, 34‑21 to Notre Dame in the National Championship, and 41–7 to Florida. The 2005 season and the 2006 season produced the first consecutive 11-win seasons in school history. In the 2007 season, the Mountaineers started the season as the #3-ranked team, the highest preseason ranking in school history. That team eventually was ranked #1 in the Coaches Poll and finished the season with a third consecutive 11-win season after their Fiesta Bowl victory.

Stadium: Milan Puskar Stadium at Mountaineer Field
Head coach: Rich Rodriguez
Conference: Big 12
All-time record: 701–456–45 (.583)
Bowl record: 14-17
Conference titles: 15 (8 Southern Conference, 7 Big East Conference)
Consensus All-Americans: 11
BCS Bowl Game record: (3-0)
Highest Coaches Poll ranking: #1 (2007)
Highest AP Poll ranking: #2 (2007)
Highest final top 25 ranking: #5 (1988 & 2005)

=== Baseball ===
Playing facility: Kendrick Family Ballpark (3,500 plus hillside seating)
Head coach: Steve Sabins
Most victories: 44 (2025)
NCAA Tournament appearances: 16
Last NCAA appearance: 2025
All-Americans: 17
Players in the Majors: 26

=== Men's basketball ===
West Virginia men's basketball has competed in three basketball championship final matches: the 1959 NCAA final, the 1942 NIT final (at that time, the NIT was considered more prestigious than the NCAA), and the 2007 NIT Championship. They lost to California in the 1959 NCAA finals, while the Mountaineers won the 1942 NIT Championship over Western Kentucky, and the 2007 NIT contest over Clemson. In 1949 future Mountaineers head coach Fred Schaus became the first player in NCAA history to record 1,000 points.

Recently, West Virginia reached the Final Four of the 2010 NCAA Men's Division I Basketball Tournament, led by West Virginia coach and former WVU player Bob Huggins. The Mountaineers won the 2010 Big East men's basketball tournament and received a #2 seed in the East Region of the 2010 NCAA Division I men's basketball tournament.

In 2015, West Virginia reached the Sweet Sixteen of the 2015 NCAA Division I men's basketball tournament. They were eliminated from the tournament after losing to Kentucky. In 2018, West Virginia again reached the Sweet Sixteen of the 2018 NCAA Division I men's basketball tournament. They were eliminated from the tournament after losing in the fourth round to #1 seed and eventual champion Villanova.

Playing facility: Hope Coliseum (14,000)
Head coach: Ross Hodge
Most victories: 31 in 2010
Big East Conference Champion: 2010
NCAA Tournament appearances: 31
Last NCAA appearance: 2021
NCAA Final Four: 1959, 2010
NIT appearances: 15
Last NIT appearance: 2014
NIT Championships: 2 (1942, 2007)
All-Americans: 13
Drafted players: 28
Players in the NBA: 14

=== Women's basketball ===
Playing facility: Hope Coliseum (14,000)
Head coach: Mark Kellogg
Most victories: 30 in 2014
Big 12 Conference Champion: 2017
NCAA Tournament appearances: 11
WNIT appearances: 2
Last NCAA appearance: 2017
All-Americans: 4
Drafted players: 3
Players in the WNBA: 2

=== Cross Country ===
Head Coach: Sean Cleary
World Cross Country qualifiers: 13
BIG EAST Conference Champions: 2007
NCAA Regional Champions: 2004, 2008, 2024, 2025
NCAA appearances: 16
NCAA Top 10 finishes: 7: 2007, 2008, 2009, 2011, 2014, 2024, 2025
NCAA Elite 8 finishes: 5 2008, 2009, 2011, 2014, 2024,
NCAA Final 4 finishes: 2: 2008, 2024
Highest NCAA finish: 2nd 2024
Last NCAA appearance: 2025
All-Americans: 22
Elite 89 winners: Ahna Lewis-2009, Kelly Williams 2014
NACAC Champions, Metcalfe, Grandt, Harrison
NACAC Silver Medals

Asselin, Forsey, Wood. Simpson

National team members:

World Cross Country team members 14

NACAC Championship team members 10

=== Men's golf ===
WVU sponsored men's golf from 1933 until dropping the sport in 1982. On July 1, 2013, then-WVU athletic director Oliver Luck announced that the sport would be reinstated in the 2015–16 school year.

Competition facilities: Seven regional courses (all in West Virginia except as indicated):
- Two courses at Lakeview Golf Resort, Cheat Lake – Lakeview and Mountainview
- Two courses at Nemacolin Woodlands Resort, Farmington, Pennsylvania – The Links and Mystic Rock. In addition, the Mountaineers will use the Nemacolin Golf Academy at the resort as a practice facility.
- Pete Dye Golf Club, Bridgeport
- The Pines Country Club, Morgantown. To be used for both competition and practice.
- Stonewall Jackson Resort, Arnold Palmer Signature Course, Roanoke
Head coach: Sean Covich

The Mountaineer golf program reached their first ever top 25 ranking back in the fall semester in 2019 with their top 5 finish at the Gopher invitational hosted by the University of Minnesota. In April 2021, they were ranked in 76th place.

In 2021, the Mountaineers claimed their third straight Mountaineer Invitational victory on April 13. During that same event, Mark Goetz won the individual tournament with a score of -12 (70-69-65).

=== Gymnastics ===
Competition facility: Hope Coliseum (14,000)
Head coach: Jason Butts
Most victories: 26 in 1992
NCAA Tournament appearances: 3 (under former head coach Linda Burdette)
AIAW appearances: 1
Last NCAA appearance: 2000
All-Americans: 4

=== Rifle ===
With a total of 26 individual NCAA National Champions and 20 team NCAA National Championship titles, West Virginia University's rifle team is the most successful rifle program in the history of the NCAA. Their most recent National Championship as a team was won in 2017. The Mountaineers compete in the Great America Rifle Conference where they have won 11 regular-season conference championships.

The team's home matches take place at the WVU Rifle Range which opened in 2010. Virginia Thrasher, who won a gold medal in the women's 10-meter air rifle at the 2016 Summer Olympics, was on the Mountaineers rifle team from 2015 to 2019.

Playing facility: WVU Shell Building
Head coach: Jon Hammond
Most victories: 19 in 1964
NCAA appearances: 26
NCAA Team Championships: 20
NCAA Team runner up: 7
National Individual Champions: 25
NCAA All-Americans: 65
Olympians: 13
Gold medal: Virginia "Ginny" Thrasher - Rio 2016
Awards: CaptainU Coach of the Year

=== Women's rowing ===
Playing facility: WVU Boathouse
Head coach: Jimmy King

=== Men's soccer ===
Playing facility: Dick Dlesk Soccer Stadium (1,600)
Head coach: Daniel Stratford
Most victories: 15 in 2006
NCAA tournament appearances: 15
Last NCAA appearance: 2021
All-Americans: 7
Mountaineer professionals: 12

=== Women's soccer ===
Since joining the Big 12 Conference ahead of the 2012 season, West Virginia women's soccer has posted a 27–1–3 record in regular-season league games. In 2016, the Mountaineers claimed their fifth consecutive outright regular-season league championship, becoming the first team in Big 12 history to accomplish that feat. West Virginia also won back-to-back Big 12 tournament championships in 2013 and 2014, as well as two additional Big 12 tournament championships in 2016 and 2018. The Mountaineers are coached by Nikki Izzo-Brown, the program's only head coach.

West Virginia men's soccer competes in the Sun Belt Conference (since 2022). The team is 2024 double champion (regular season and tournament) of the Sun Belt, ending that year the 16th in the nationwide Uniter Soccer Coaches Ranking and the 21st in the NCAA DI Men's Soccer RPI ranking with 13-2-7.

Playing facility: Dick Dlesk Soccer Stadium (1,600)
Head coach: Nikki Izzo-Brown
Most victories: 23 in 2016
BIG EAST Conference Champions: 2007, 2010, 2011
BIG 12 Conference Champions: 2012, 2013, 2014, 2015, 2016, 2022
NCAA tournament appearances: 21 (lost in finals 2016)
Last NCAA appearance: 2020
All-Americans: 45
Academic All-American: 4
Mountaineer professionals: 28

=== Men's swimming ===
Playing facility: Mylan Park
Head coach: Vic Riggs
Most victories: 13 in 2007
Big East Conference Champions: 2007
NCAA qualifiers: 19
NCAA All-Americans: 2
Olympians: 1

=== Women's swimming ===
Playing facility: Mylan Park
Head coach: Vic Riggs
Most victories: 9 in 1990
NCAA qualifiers: 14
NCAA All-Americans: 4
Olympians: 1

=== Women's tennis ===
Playing facility: Mountaineer Tennis Courts
Head coach: Miha Lisac
Most victories: 21 in 1990

=== Men's track ===
Men's track was discontinued in 2003.

=== Women's track ===
Playing facility: Mylan Track, Shell Indoor Track
Head coach: Sean Cleary 2007-present - 108 All American’s for Cleary
Assistants: Shell Ann Galimore, Erin Oreilly, Clara Santucci, Amy Cashin, Jordan Hamric, Phil White
Olympians: 11
NCAA National Champions: 4

Pat Itanyi Long Jump 1994, Kate Vermeulen 1999 Mile, Megan Metcalf 5000 2005, Ceili McCabe 3000m 2024,

NCAA Runner Up finishes: Marie Louise Asselin 2011-5000, Kate Harrison 10,000 2012

NCAA Top 10 finishes: 1 2010 NCAA Sweet 16 finishes: 1999, 2010, 2011 NCAA top 20 finishes: 5 1999, 2009, 2010, 2010, 2011, 2024

=== Women's volleyball ===
Playing facility: Hope Coliseum (14,000)
Head coach: Jen Greeny
Most victories: 35 in 1979
NCAA Tournament appearances: 1
Last NCAA appearance: 2021
NIT appearances: 1
All-Americans: 0
All-East: 2

=== Wrestling ===
Founded: 1921
Dual meets and tournament facility: Hope Coliseum (14,000)
Head coach: Tim Flynn
Most victories: 14 in 1976 and 1990
NCAA individual appearances: 67
Best NCAA finish: 6th in 1991
All-Americans: 16
National Champions: 3
EWL Champions: 18

- Prior to joining the Big 12, West Virginia wrestled as a member of the Eastern Wrestling League as the Big East was a non-wrestling conference.

== Championships ==
=== NCAA team championships ===
West Virginia has won 22 NCAA team national championships.

- Men's (1)
  - Boxing (1): 1938 (unofficial)
- Co-ed (21)
  - Rifle (21): 1983, 1984, 1986, 1988, 1989, 1990, 1991, 1992, 1993, 1995, 1996, 1997, 1998, 2009, 2013, 2014, 2015, 2016, 2017, 2025, 2026
- See also: Big 12 Conference national team titles
- See also: List of NCAA schools with the most NCAA Division I championships

=== Other national team championships ===
Below are the national team titles that were not bestowed by the NCAA:

- Men's basketball (1): 1942
- Rifle (4): 1913, 1961, 1964, 1966
- Cricket (3): 2019, 2020, 2022
- See also: List of college athletics championship game outcomes#Rifle
- See also: List of NCAA schools with the most Division I national championships

=== NCAA individual and relay championships ===
West Virginia athletes have won 41 individual and relay national championships:

Men's (25)
Sport	Athlete	Year(s)	Event
Boxing	Mickey Brutto	1936	115lb
Boxing	Sam Littlepage	1938	165lb
Boxing	Ashby Dickerson	1938	Heavyweight
Indoor Track & Field	Mike Mosser	1972	1,000 Yard
Rifle	John Rost	1981, 1982	Air Rifle
Rifle	David Johnson	1983	Smallbore
Rifle	Bob Broughton	1984	Smallbore
Rifle	Christian Heller	1985	Air Rifle
Rifle	Mike Anti	1986	Smallbore
Rifle	Web Wright	1987, 1988	Smallbore
Rifle	Gary Hardy	1990	Air Rifle
Rifle	Tim Manges	1992	Smallbore
Rifle	Eric Uptagrafft	1993	Smallbore
Rifle	Trevor Gathman	1993, 1996	Air Rifle
Rifle	Marcos Scrivner	1997	Smallbore
Rifle	Nicco Campriani	2011	Air Rifle
Rifle	Gavin Barnick	2024	Air Rifle
Wrestling	Scott Collins	1991	142lb
Wrestling	Dean Morrison	1994	177lb
Wrestling	Greg Jones	2002, 2004, 2005	174lb (2002), 184lb

Women's (16)
Sport	Athlete	Year(s)	Event
Indoor Track & Field	Kate Vermeulen	1999	Mile
Indoor Track & Field	Ceili McCabe	2025	3,000 Meter
Outdoor Track & Field	Pat Itanyi	1995	Long Jump
Outdoor Track & Field	Megan Metcalfe	2005	5,000 Meter
Rifle	Ann-Marie Pfiffner	1991, 1992	Air Rifle
Rifle	Petra Zublasing	2012, 2013 (Note: Won both Air Rifle and Smallbore championships.)	Air Rifle, Smallbore (2013)
Rifle	Maren Prediger	2015	Air Rifle
Rifle	Ginny Thrasher	2016	Air Rifle, Smallbore
Rifle	Morgan Phillips	2017, 2018	Smallbore
Rifle	Milica Babic	2017	Air Rifle
Rifle	Mary Tucker	2024	Smallbore

== NCAA Division I: NACDA Learfield Director's Cup ==
See footnote and NACDA Directors' Cup

WVU Directors' Cup Standings

Seasons	National rank	Conference rank
1993–94	67th	6th
1994–95	92nd	10th
1995–96	63rd	6th
1996–97	72nd	11th
1997–98	41st	2nd
1998–99	60th	6th
1999–00	77th	10th

Seasons	National rank	Conference rank
2000–01	70th	7th
2001–02	76th	9th
2002–03	84th	11th
2003–04	71st	8th
2004–05	59th	3rd
2005–06	52nd	2nd
2006–07	57th	4th

Seasons	National rank	Conference rank
2007–08	30th	2nd
2008–09	50th	3rd
2009–10	37th	2nd
2010–11	40th	3rd
2011–12	45th	3rd

== Notable non-varsity sports ==
=== Rugby ===
The West Virginia Rugby Football Club was established in 1974, and is the oldest established club sport at WVU. In the fall of 2013, WVU won the Keystone Conference and qualified for the American Collegiate Rugby Championship, where they lost to Kutztown in the quarterfinals. In the spring of 2014, WVU reached the D1-AA national playoffs, where they defeated Princeton 41–24, but lost in the quarterfinals 34–14 to San Diego. The Mountaineers play their home games at the Mylan Park Athletic Field Complex. The Mountaineers have been led by Head Coach Shotaro Egashira since Fall of 2024.

=== Cricket ===
The West Virginia Cricket Club competes in American College Cricket. In 2019, the Mountaineers won the American College Cricket National Championship by defeating NJIT. The following year, the Mountaineers qualified for the 2020 National Championship tournament. However, due to COVID-19, the event was canceled. Following the resumption of American College Cricket in 2022, it was decided that the 2020 tournament would be made up. The Mountaineers also qualified for the 2022 National Championship tournament and played in both tournaments during the same week. They went on to win both tournaments, defeating Arkansas State to be crowned 2020 national champions and Florida to become 2022 national champions.

== Pageantry ==
=== Mascot ===
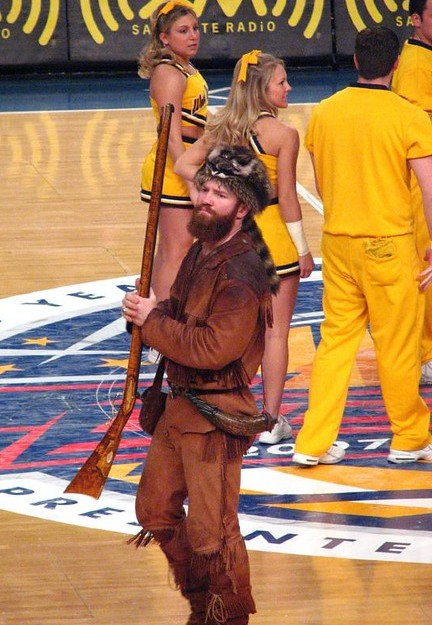
The Mountaineer, WV mascot, as seen in 2007

The Mountaineer was adopted in 1890 as the official school mascot and unofficially began appearing at sporting events in 1936. A new Mountaineer is selected each year during the final two men's home basketball games, with the formal title "The Mountaineer of West Virginia University." The new Mountaineer receives a scholarship, a tailor-made buckskin suit with coonskin hat, and a period rifle and powder horn for discharging when appropriate and safe. The mascot travels with most sports teams throughout the academic year. While not required, male mascots traditionally grow a beard. Jonathan Kimble, a Franklin, WV native (pictured) served his term as the 2012-2013 WVU Mountaineer. Each newly named Mountaineer will officially take over as the mascot at the annual spring football game.

=== Logos ===
The "flying WV" logo, designed in 1980

Designed by sports artist John Martin, The "Flying WV" is the most widely used logo in West Virginia athletics. It debuted in 1980 as a part of a football uniform redesign by Coach Don Nehlen, and was adopted as the official logo for the university in 1983.

While the "Flying WV" represents all university entities, unique logos are occasionally used for individual departments. Some examples include the script West Virginia logo for the WVU Department of Intercollegiate Athletics, and the interlocking WV logo used in baseball.

=== Songs ===
The official fight songs of West Virginia University are "Fight Mountaineers" and "Hail, West Virginia." "Hail, West Virginia." was composed by WVU alumni Earl Miller and Ed McWhorther in 1915 with lyrics by Fred B. Deem. The "Pride of West Virginia" Mountaineer Marching Band performs the second verse of "Hail, West Virginia" as part of its pregame performance at Mountaineer football games. The band's pregame arrangement of "Hail, West Virginia" was arranged by WVU's 7th band director - Dr. Budd Udell. The line "Others may be black or crimson, but for us it's Gold and Blue." is in reference to Washington & Jefferson College, an early rival.

In addition to the official fight songs of West Virginia university, the fan response to West Virginia's official state song, "Take Me Home, Country Roads" by John Denver, has made "Country Roads" the unofficial song of the university (arrangement by Dr. James Miltenberger).

The West Virginia University Alma Mater was composed in 1937, and is sung before every home football game.

=== Colors ===
The upperclassmen of 1890 selected the official colors of "old gold and blue" from the West Virginia state seal. While the official school colors are old gold and blue, a brighter gold is used in official university logos and merchandise. This change in color scheme is often cited for the lack of a universal standard for colors during 19th century when the university's colors were selected. Additionally, the brighter gold is argued to create a more intimidating environment for sporting events. The university accepts "gold and blue" for the color scheme, but states clearly that the colors are not "blue and gold", to distinguish West Virginia from its rival school the University of Pittsburgh.

=== Marching band ===
The West Virginia University Mountaineer Marching Band is nicknamed "The Pride of West Virginia". The 390-member band performs at every home football game and makes several local and national appearances throughout the year. The band was the recipient of the prestigious Sudler Trophy in 1997.

== Sports traditions ==
=== Firing of the Musket ===
The Mountaineer mascot carries a period Musket and powder horn for firing a shot to signal the opening of several athletic events. The Mountaineer points the gun into the air with one arm and fires a blank shot, a signal to the crowd to begin cheering at home football and basketball games. The Mountaineer also fires the musket every time the team scores during football games.

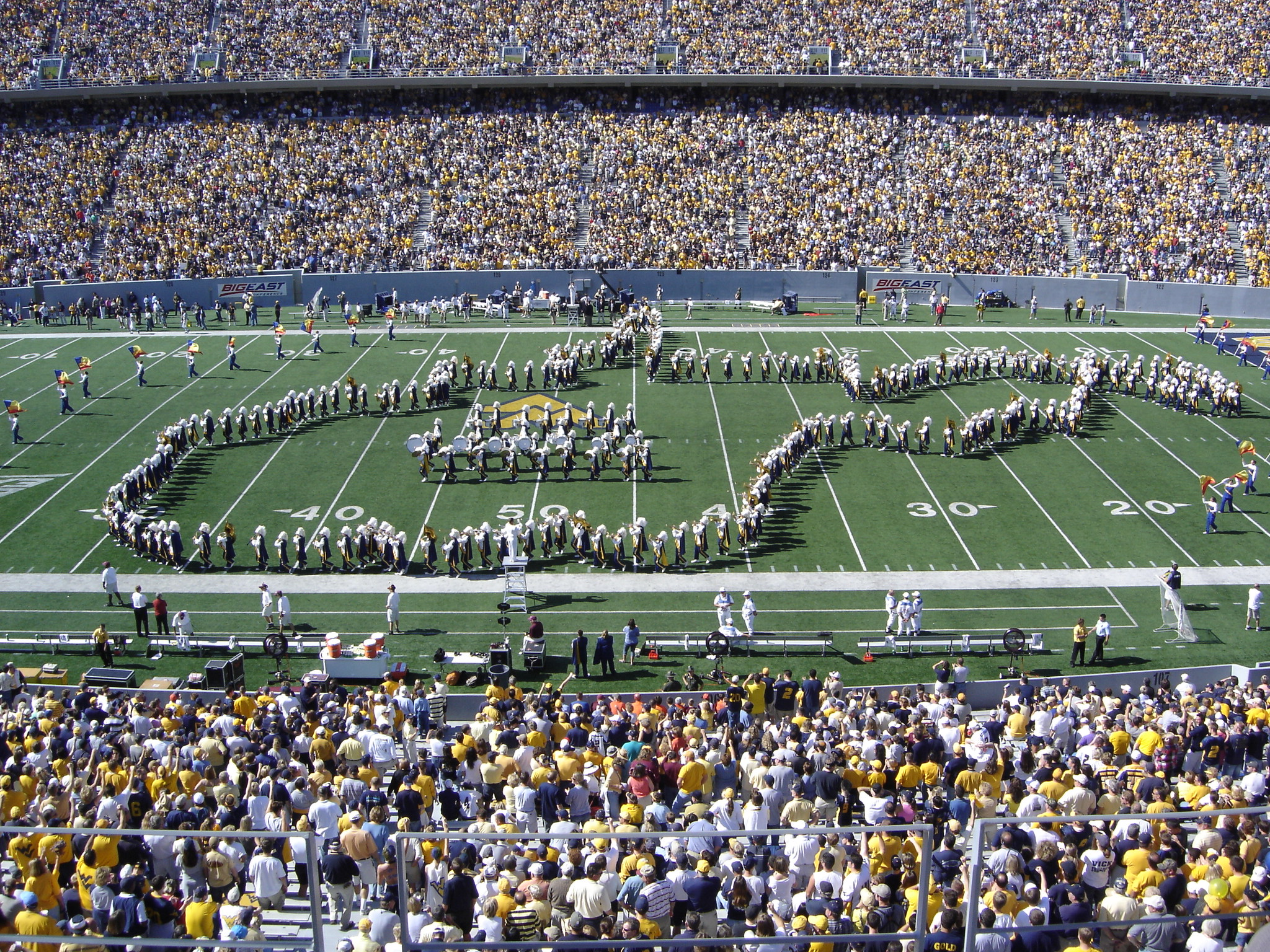
Formation of the state

=== Formation of the State ===
The Pride of West Virginia forms the outline of the state of West Virginia during the pregame show of all home Mountaineer football games. The outline of the state moves down the field during the playing of "Hail West Virginia", and the shape inverts to face the student side of the stadium when the crowd begins the "Let's Go...Mountaineers" chant.

=== Cheers ===
The "Let's Go...Mountaineers" cheer originated at home football games as a competition between opposite sides of the stadium. The student side of the stadium chants "Let's Go...", and the pressbox side responds "Mountaineers". The chant can continue for long periods of time, as each side of the stadium tries to keep the chant from fading. The cheer has spread to other athletic events including basketball and soccer.

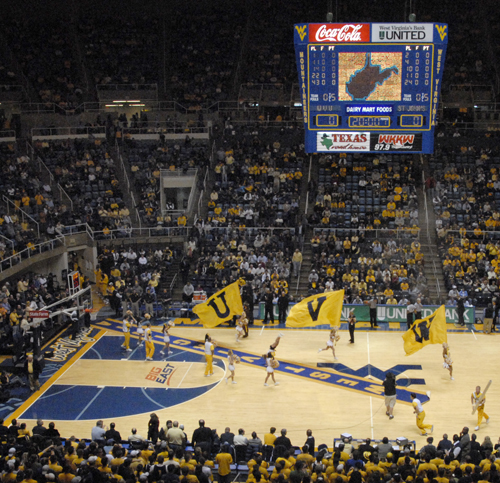
Carpet roll at a basketball game

Since the early 2000s, the "WVU First Down" cheer is used when fans are expecting a first down call during a football game. Prior to the announcement, fans put their arms in the air and yell while waiting for the call. After the announcer at Milan Puskar Stadium says, "First down, West Virginia," the fans lower and raise their arms three times while simultaneously yelling the initials "WVU". Then, the fans clap and signal to the end zone while cheering "first down!"

=== Carpet roll ===
In 1955, Fred Schaus and Alex Mumford devised the idea of rolling out an elaborate gold and blue carpet for Mountaineer basketball players to use when taking the court for pre-game warm-ups. In addition, Mountaineer players warmed up with a special gold and blue basketball. The tradition died out in the 1960s, died out, but former Mountaineer player Gale Catlett reintroduced the carpet when he returned to Morgantown in 1978 as head coach of the men's basketball team.

== Fanbase ==
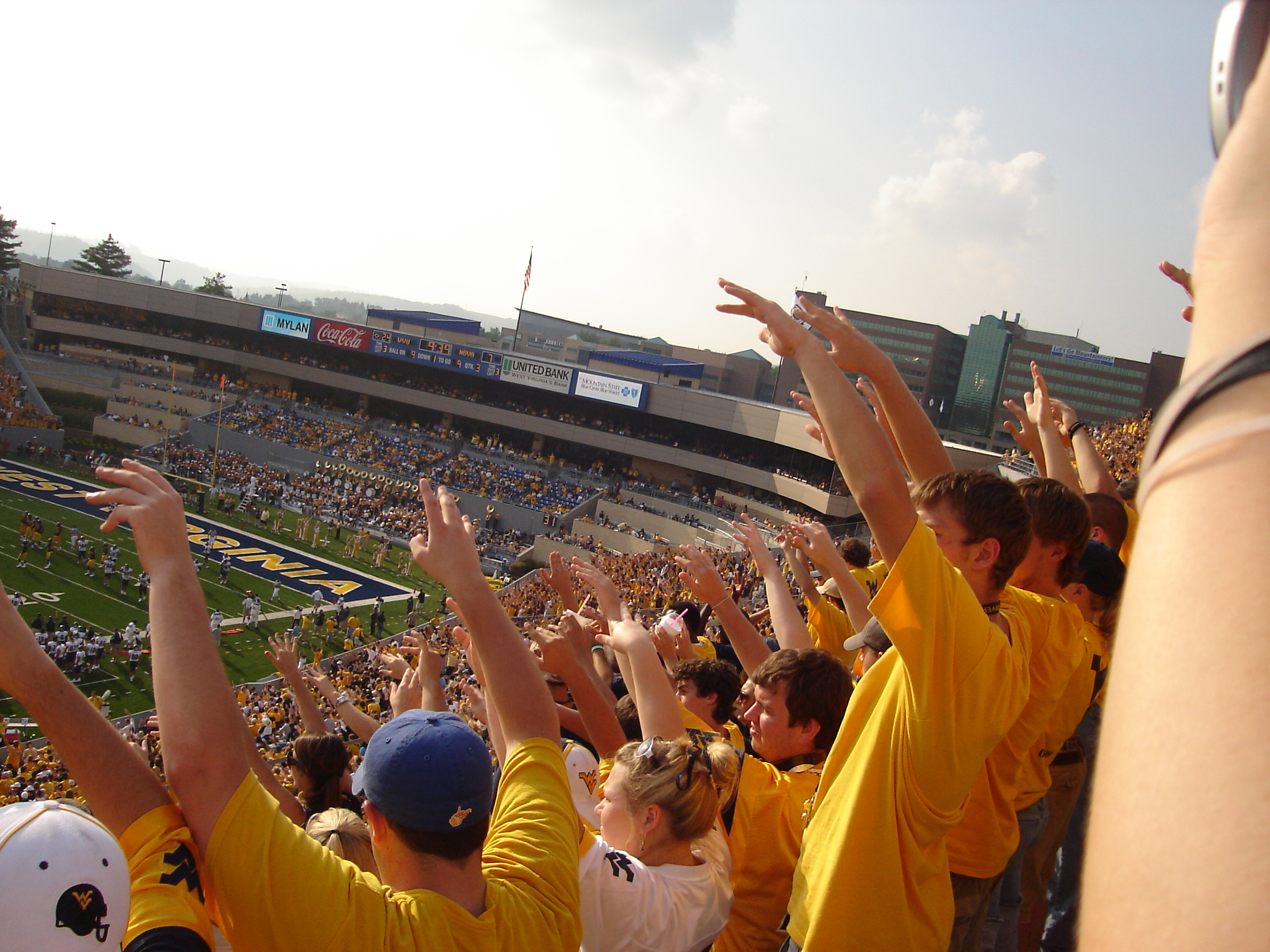
The WVU student section perform the first down cheer at a home football game.

In a state that lacks professional sports franchises, the citizens of West Virginia passionately support West Virginia University and its athletics teams. West Virginia fans are nationally known for following their Mountaineers to bowl games and games throughout the country. West Virginia games also have received high TV ratings throughout the years. Men's basketball head coach Bob Huggins, a former Mountaineer basketball player who was born in Morgantown, stated that the "strong bond between the university and the people of West Virginia" is a relationship that is difficult for non-natives to understand. Former basketball player Da'Sean Butler cited the fan support as a factor in his decision to play for WVU, saying "everybody loves our school to death" in reference to the fan base in West Virginia.

Some WVU fans, primarily in the student sections, better known as the "Mountaineer Maniacs" have developed a reputation for unruly behavior, being compared to "soccer hooligans" by GQ magazine. At some events, there have been cases of objects thrown onto the field or at opposing teams. There were also issues with small-scale fires, most notably of couches, being set after games; over 1,100 intentionally ignited street fires were reported from 1997 to 2003.

West Virginia fans have also been recognized for their hospitality. In the first football game played by the University of Connecticut following the death of Jasper Howard, a banner displayed at Mountaineer Field in the Connecticut entrance tunnel read "Today we are all Huskies". Connecticut fans described the warmth of the environment as impressive, citing the number of WVU fans who offered condolences. In a letter to WVU, then UConn head football coach Randy Edsall wrote:

"The response that you gave our team before and after the game was tremendous and greatly appreciated. The pregame moment of silence and team handshake was the most moving experience I have ever had in my 29 years of coaching football."

=== Student section ===
Some WVU fans, primarily in the student sections, have developed a reputation for unruly behavior, being compared to "soccer hooligans" by GQ magazine. At some events, objects have been thrown onto the field or at opposing teams. There were previously also issues with small-scale fires, most notably of couches, being set after games; over 1,100 intentionally ignited street fires were reported from 1997 to 2003. The tradition of igniting furniture continues to this day, including the celebration after the WVU basketball team won the Big East title. Fires have sometimes occurred in response to non-sporting events, such as following the announcement that Osama bin Laden had been killed. Much of this behavior has died down in recent years.

== Notable athletes ==
- Joe Alexander - former NBA player for the Milwaukee Bucks and Chicago Bulls
- Tavon Austin
- Stedman Bailey
- Terry Bowden - Yahoo sports analyst
- Tommy Bowden - former head football coach at Clemson University and Tulane University
- Darryl Bryant - international professional basketball player, currently in Tehran, Iran
- Kadeisha Buchanan – current Canada women's international soccer player
- Marc Bulger - former NFL quarterback for St. Louis Rams
- Da'Sean Butler - former NBA basketball player for the Miami Heat, currently a graduate assistant coach for WVU basketball
- Jevon Carter - NBA player for the Chicago Bulls
- Gale Catlett - former West Virginia head coach with the most wins at West Virginia
- Avon Cobourne - former NFL running back for the Detroit Lions, currently with the CFL Hamilton Tiger-Cats
- Mike Compton - former NFL guard for the Detroit Lions, New England Patriots, and Jacksonville Jaguars
- Robert Dennis - university's first Male Big East Conference Track & Field champion
- Noel Devine - current CFL running back for the Montreal Alouettes
- Devin Ebanks - NBA basketball player for the Los Angeles Lakers
- Raymon Gaddis - current defender for the Philadelphia Union
- Mike Gansey - former professional basketball player in the NBA Development League; currently in the front office of the Cleveland Cavaliers
- Major Harris - quarterbacked for West Virginia in their 1988 undefeated season
- Chris Henry - former NFL wide receiver for the Cincinnati Bengals
- Johannes "Joe" Herber - former German international basketball player
- Jeff Hostetler - former Washington Redskins, Oakland Raiders & New York Giants Quarterback
- Chuck Howley - WVU five sport Letterman, former NFL linebacker and Super Bowl MVP with Dallas Cowboys
- Sam Huff - former NFL linebacker, inducted into the Pro Football Hall of Fame in 1982
- Bob Huggins - former WVU basketball player; current head basketball coach of the WVU men's basketball team; one of only four active Division I coaches with 700+ career victories
- Rodney "Hot Rod" Hundley - first pick in the 1957 NBA draft by the Cincinnati Royals
- Patience Itanyi - West Virginia University's first-ever female track and field national champion
- James Jett - All-American sprinter and wide receiver for Los Angeles and Oakland Raiders
- Adam "Pacman" Jones - former NFL cornerback for the Tennessee Titans(#6 draft choice overall), Dallas Cowboys and currently with the Cincinnati Bengals
- Greg Jones - three-time NCAA Division 1 wrestling champion, 2005 Most Outstanding Wrestler award winner; current Associate Head Coach for the Mountaineer Wrestling team
- Kevin Jones - current power forward for the Cleveland Cavaliers
- Brian Jozwiak - former lineman, Kansas City Chiefs
- Ken Kendrick - owner of the Arizona Diamondbacks of Major League Baseball
- Steve Kline - former Major League Baseball pitcher
- Oliver Luck - former NFL quarterback and president and former athletic director at WVU
- Pat McAfee - former NFL punter for the Indianapolis Colts
- Dan Mozes - First Team All American center, won the Rimington Trophy in his senior year
- Adrian Murrell - former running back for New York Jets
- Kevin Pittsnogle - former WVU basketball star
- Jerry Porter - former NFL wide receiver for the Oakland Raiders and Jacksonville Jaguars
- Rich Rodriguez - former head football coach at West Virginia University and University of Michigan
- Todd Sauerbrun - former NFL punter; went to the Pro Bowl in 2002, 2003, and 2004
- Owen Schmitt - former NFL fullback for the Oakland Raiders
- Floyd B. "Ben" Schwartzwalder - Former head coach of the 1959 National Championship Syracuse University football team
- Steve Slaton - current NFL free agent running back
- Geno Smith - quarterback for the Las Vegas Raiders
- Darryl Talley - WVU all-time team member and former NFL Linebacker for the Buffalo Bills
- Rod Thorn - former WVU basketball player and Naismith Memorial Basketball Hall of Fame inductee
- John Thornton - former defensive tackle for the Cincinnati Bengals
- Virginia Thrasher - sports shooter who won a gold medal in the women's 10 meter air rifle at the 2016 Summer Olympics
- Mike Vanderjagt - former Indianapolis Colts and Dallas Cowboys placekicker
- Jerry West - WVU and NBA basketball player, member of Naismith Basketball Hall of Fame, model for NBA logo
- Pat White - former NFL quarterback for the Miami Dolphins and Minor League Baseball player for the Kansas City Royals
- Andrew Wright - current defender/midfielder for Morecambe F.C.
- Amos Zereoué - former NFL running back for the Pittsburgh Steelers, Oakland Raiders, and New England Patriots
