= Immaculate Reception =

Unusual football play in 1972–73 NFL playoffs

The Immaculate Reception
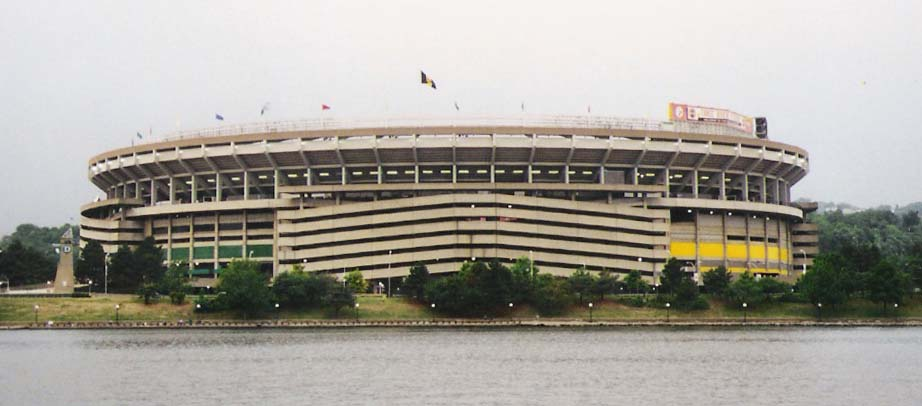
- The game was played at Three Rivers Stadium in Pittsburgh, Pennsylvania
Oakland Raiders (10–3–1)	Pittsburgh Steelers (11–3)
7	13
Head coach: John Madden	Head coach: Chuck Noll
	1	2	3	4	Total
OAK	0	0	0	7	7
PIT	0	0	3	10	13
- Date: December 23, 1972
- Stadium: Three Rivers Stadium; Pittsburgh, Pennsylvania
- Referee: Fred Swearingen
- Attendance: 50,327

TV in the United States
- Network: NBC
- Announcers: Curt Gowdy and Al DeRogatis

The Immaculate Reception is one of the most famous plays in the history of American football. It was a touchdown which occurred in the AFC divisional playoff game of the National Football League (NFL), between the Pittsburgh Steelers and the Oakland Raiders at Three Rivers Stadium in Pittsburgh, Pennsylvania, on December 23, 1972.

With his team trailing 7–6, on fourth down with 22 seconds left in the game, Steelers quarterback Terry Bradshaw threw a pass targeting Steelers running back John Fuqua. The ball may have bounced off the helmet of Raiders safety Jack Tatum, although many observers believe that Tatum never contacted the pass. Steelers fullback Franco Harris caught it just before it hit the ground and ran for a game-winning touchdown. The play has been a source of much controversy and speculation ever since, with many contending that the ball touched only Fuqua (and did not in any way touch Tatum) or that it hit the ground before Harris caught it, either of which would have resulted in an incomplete pass by the rules of the time. Kevin Cook's The Last Headbangers cites the play as the beginning of a bitter rivalry between the Steelers and the Raiders that fueled a historically brutal Raiders team during the NFL's most controversially physical era.

NFL Films has chosen the Immaculate Reception as the greatest play of all time, as well as the most controversial. The play was also selected as the Greatest Play in NFL History in the NFL Network's 100 series. The play proved to be a turning point for the Steelers, reversing four decades of futility with their first playoff win ever; they went on to win four Super Bowls by the end of the 1970s.

The play's name is a pun derived from the Immaculate Conception, a dogma in the Roman Catholic Church. The phrase was first used on air by Myron Cope, a Pittsburgh sportscaster who was reporting on the Steelers' victory. A Pittsburgh woman, Sharon Levosky, called Cope before his 11:00 p.m. sports broadcast that night and suggested the name, which was coined by her then-boyfriend Michael Ord during a celebration at a local bar after the two attended the game in person. Cope used the term on television and the phrase stuck. The phrase was apparently meant to imply that the play was miraculous in nature (see Hail Mary pass for a similar term).

== Background ==
=== Playoff history ===
The Oakland Raiders had been to the postseason four previous times. In 1967 they won the AFL Championship before losing Super Bowl II against the Green Bay Packers. The following three seasons they made it back to the playoffs but lost to the eventual champions in all three instances (New York Jets in 1968, Kansas City Chiefs in 1969, Baltimore Colts in 1970). The "Immaculate Reception" game thus marked their return to the postseason after missing out on a playoff berth the year before.

The Pittsburgh Steelers, on the other hand, had appeared in the postseason only once, losing against the Philadelphia Eagles, 21–0, in an NFL divisional playoff game on December 21, 1947. The Steelers' fortunes began to change, however, in 1969, when they hired head coach Chuck Noll, who won four Super Bowls in six years with the team between the 1974 and 1979 seasons. That streak began two years after the "Immaculate Reception" game.

=== 1972 season ===
The 1972 season marked the third year after the AFL-NFL merger, which had the Steelers move to the newly formed American Football Conference despite not having been a member of the American Football League. Thus, this was the third year in which a playoff meeting between the Raiders and the Steelers could take place outside a Super Bowl.

Having missed the playoffs the year before, the two teams met in the opening game of the season (on September 17), which Pittsburgh won, 34–28. In that game, the Steelers took leads of 17–0 and 27–7 on a blocked-punt return touchdown and two rushing touchdowns by quarterback Terry Bradshaw. Oakland fought back with three touchdowns in the fourth quarter, including a 70-yard touchdown pass from quarterback Daryle Lamonica to wide receiver Mike Siani, but Pittsburgh prevailed.

Both teams won their respective divisions. Pittsburgh's 11–3 record put them one game over the Cleveland Browns, who earned the AFC's wild card spot, and Oakland's mark of 10–3–1 ousted the Kansas City Chiefs by 2½ games. Until 1975 the home teams in the playoffs were two of the three division champions decided based on a yearly divisional rotation. The Miami Dolphins hosted the wild card team in the first round of the playoffs, which set up the matchup between Pittsburgh and Oakland.

== Game synopsis ==
The teams played to a scoreless tie at halftime, with Oakland's longest gain coming on an 11-yard completion from Daryle Lamonica to Fred Biletnikoff. Pittsburgh, meanwhile, came fairly close to a scoring chance, but passed up on a field goal attempt from the Oakland 31-yard line. Instead, Steelers running back John Fuqua was stopped by Raiders safety Jack Tatum on a fourth-and-2 run to turn possession over to the Raiders. On its first possession of the second half, however, Pittsburgh opted for a field goal, with placekicker Roy Gerela's successful 18-yard attempt accounting for the first score of the game.

Later in the third quarter, Lamonica was intercepted for the second time in the game – both times by a Steelers linebacker (Andy Russell in the first quarter, Jack Ham in the third). Lamonica's latest turnover prompted Raiders head coach John Madden to put Ken Stabler into the game at quarterback.

After an interception thrown by Bradshaw in Oakland territory – the Steelers' only turnover of the game – Stabler turned the ball back over to Pittsburgh, when he fumbled the ball inside the Oakland 25-yard line. This led to another field goal by Gerela to extend the Steelers' lead to 6–0. Stabler, however, successfully led Oakland down the field, when he capped a fourth-quarter drive with a 30-yard touchdown run. The ensuing extra point by placekicker George Blanda gave Oakland a 7–6 lead with 1:17 left, setting up the dramatic ending to the game.

== Events of the play ==
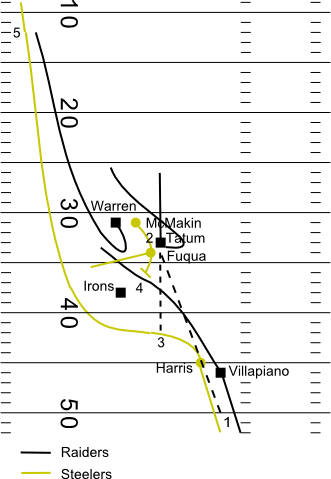
Diagram of the Immaculate Reception

Trailing Oakland 7–6, the Steelers faced fourth-and-10 on their own 40-yard line with 22 seconds remaining in the game and no timeouts. Head coach Chuck Noll called a pass play, 66 Circle Option, intended for receiver Barry Pearson, a rookie who was playing in his first NFL game.

Bradshaw (1 in diagram) dropped back and, under great pressure from Raiders linemen Tony Cline and Horace Jones, scrambled to his right and threw the ball from his 29-yard line to the Raiders' 34-yard line, toward Fuqua. Raiders safety Tatum collided with Fuqua just as the ball arrived (2). Tatum's hit knocked Fuqua to the ground and sent the ball sailing backward several yards, end over end.

Steelers fullback Franco Harris, after initially blocking on the play, had run downfield in case Bradshaw needed another eligible receiver. After Bradshaw threw the pass towards Fuqua, Harris recounted the advice of his college football coach Joe Paterno, who always told his players, "Go to the ball." Harris, in the vicinity of the deflected pass, scooped up the sailing ball at the Oakland 44-yard line, just before it hit the ground (3). Harris ran past Raiders linebacker Gerald Irons, while linebacker Phil Villapiano, who had been covering Harris, was blocked by Steelers tight end John McMakin (4). Harris used a stiff arm to ward off Raiders defensive back Jimmy Warren (5) and went in for a touchdown. The touchdown gave the Steelers a 13–7 lead when Gerela added the ensuing extra point.

1972 AFC Divisional Round: Oakland Raiders at Pittsburgh Steelers—Game Summary

Quarter	1	2	3	4	Total
Raiders	0	0	0	7	7
Steelers	0	0	3	10	13

at Three Rivers Stadium, Pittsburgh, Pennsylvania

- Date: December 23
- Game time: 1:00 p.m. EST
- Game weather: 42 °F (6 °C), Clear
- Game attendance: 50,327
- Referee: Fred Swearingen
- TV announcers (NBC): Curt Gowdy and Al DeRogatis
- Boxscore at pro-football-reference.com

Game information

Third quarter

- PIT Roy Gerela 18 yard FG

Fourth quarter

- PIT Gerela 29 yard FG
- OAK Stabler 30 yard run (George Blanda kick)
- PIT Harris 60 yard pass from Bradshaw (Gerela kick)

Top passers

- OAK – Ken Stabler – 6/12, 57 YDS
- PIT – Terry Bradshaw – 11/25, 175 YDS, TD, INT

Top rushers

- OAK – Charlie Smith – 14 CAR, 57 YDS
- PIT – Franco Harris – 18 CAR, 64 YDS

Top receivers

- OAK – Raymond Chester – 3 REC, 40 YDS
- PIT – Franco Harris – 5 REC, 96 YDS, TD

== Referee call ==
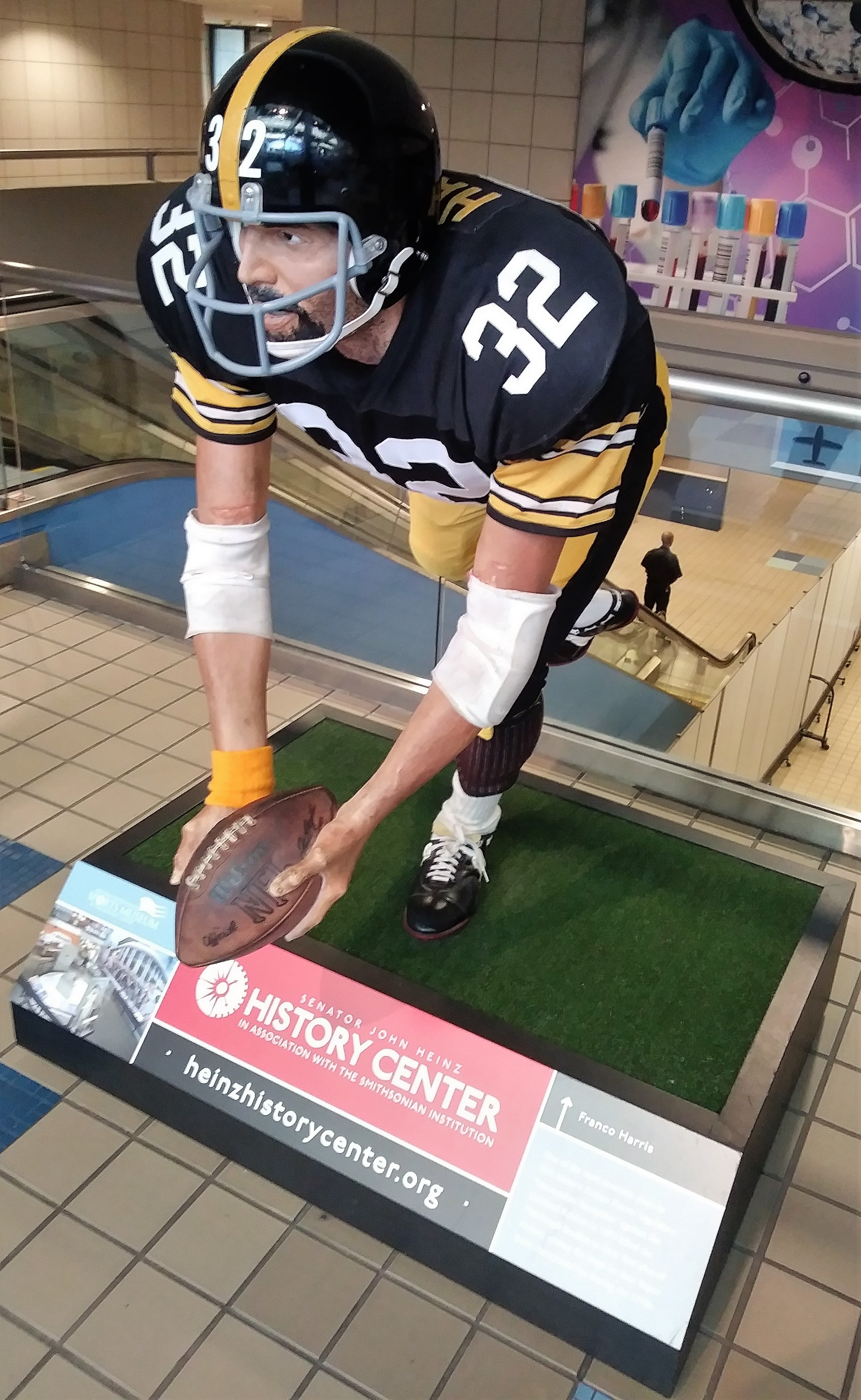
Statue of Harris making the "Immaculate Reception" at Pittsburgh International Airport

After the play, a critical question remained: whom did the football touch in the Fuqua/Tatum collision? If it bounced off Fuqua without ever touching Tatum, then Harris' reception was illegal. If the ball bounced off only Tatum or if it bounced off both Fuqua and Tatum (in any order) then the reception was legal. The rule stated in the pertinent part that if an offensive player touches a pass first, he is the only offensive player eligible to catch the pass. "However, if a [defensive] player touches [the] pass first, or simultaneously with or subsequent to its having been touched by only one [offensive] player then all [offensive] players become and remain eligible" to catch the pass. (This rule was rescinded in 1978.) If the reception was illegal, the Raiders would have gained possession (by a turnover on downs), clinching the victory.

One official, back judge Adrian Burk, signaled that the play was a touchdown but the other game officials did not immediately make any signal. When the officials huddled, Burk and another official, umpire Pat Harder, thought the play was a touchdown because Tatum and Fuqua had both touched the ball, while three others said that they were not in a position to rule.

Referee Fred Swearingen approached Steelers sideline official Jim Boston and asked to be taken to a telephone. Boston took Swearingen to a baseball dugout in the stadium. There was a video monitor in the dugout but it was not used by Swearingen. (Bradshaw's assertion that a special television was rigged up on the sideline so that Swearingen could watch the replay is not supported by other accounts.) From the dugout telephone, Boston put in a call to the press box to reach the NFL's supervisor of officials, Art McNally. Before the call, McNally had "an opinion from the get-go" that the ball had hit Tatum's chest, which he confirmed by looking "at one shot on instant replay". In the press box the telephone was answered either by Dan Rooney, son of Steelers owner Art Rooney, or by Steelers public relations director Joe Gordon (reports vary) and McNally was put on the line. According to McNally, Swearingen "never asked me about the rule and never asked what I saw. All he said was, 'Two of my men say that opposing players touched the ball.' And I said, 'Everything's fine then, go ahead.'" After Swearingen hung up the phone Boston asked, "What do we got?" "We got a touchdown," answered Swearingen, who then went back onto the field to signal the ruling to the crowd.

Harris crossed the goal line at approximately 3:29 PM EST. Fans immediately rushed the field; it took fifteen minutes to clear them so the extra point could be kicked to give the Steelers what turned out to be their final margin of victory, 13–7. Although this has been described as the first known use of television replay to confirm a call (there was no instant replay review then), at the time the NFL denied that the decision was made in the press box or using a television replay. An Oakland Tribune article two days after the game reported that Gordon told reporters in the press box that the decision had been made using the replay. Gordon has dismissed this as "a total fabrication". NFL officials Jim Kensil and Val Pinchbeck, who were in the press box with McNally, also deny that replay was used in making the decision on the play.

In various NFL Films productions about the play years later, various Raiders have theorized that the real purpose of Swearingen's phone conversation was to see if there were enough police on hand to ensure the players' safety if the play was ruled incomplete. The theory claims there were too few police so the play was called for the Steelers out of fear. In one of the films, McNally, not surprisingly, laughs at the suggestion.

The play is still disputed by those involved, particularly by living personnel from the Raiders and their fans, who insist the Raiders should have won. Tatum maintained that the ball did not bounce off him, both immediately after the game as well as later; however, in his memoirs, Tatum equivocated, stating that he could not honestly say whether or not the ball hit him. Villapiano, who was covering Harris at the time, maintains that the ball hit Fuqua. Fuqua has been coy, supposedly saying he knows exactly what happened that day but will never tell. Villapiano has also stated that he was illegally blocked by McMakin as he was pursuing Harris following the reception and he would have tackled Harris without it. Raiders coach Madden echoed this complaint. According to Raiders defensive back George Atkinson, the play is known by the Raiders and their fans as the "Immaculate Deception" because "the public was deceived, the officials were deceived, and we got deceived."

John Madden, coach of the 1972 Raiders, maintained (until his death) that he would never get over the play, and has indicated that he was bothered more by the delay between the end of the play and the final call than by which player the ball actually hit. After the game, he said that from his view the football had indeed touched Tatum. A few days later, however, Madden indicated that the Raiders' game films showed that the ball hit Fuqua's shoulder pads, Tatum conceded that "even after we viewed the game films with stop action, nobody could tell who the ball hit on that moment of impact." Years later Madden wrote, "No matter how many times I watch the films of the 'immaculate reception' play, I never know for sure what happened."

In 1998, during halftime of the AFC Championship Game, NBC showed a replay from its original broadcast. The replay presented a different angle than the NFL Films clip that is most often shown. According to a writer for the New York Daily News, "NBC's replay showed the ball clearly hit one and only one man[:] Oakland DB Jack Tatum." Curt Gowdy, doing the live television play-by-play, called it as having been deflected by Tatum, and reiterated that during the video replay.

Pittsburgh sportscaster Myron Cope, in a 1997 New York Times article and in his 2002 book Quintuple Yoi!, related that two days after the game he reviewed film taken by local Pittsburgh TV station WTAE-TV which showed "[n]o question about it – Bradshaw's pass struck Tatum squarely on his right shoulder." Cope stated that WTAE's film would be next to impossible to find again because of inadequate filing procedures at the station.

In 2004, John Fetkovich, an emeritus professor of physics at Carnegie Mellon University in Pittsburgh and an admitted Steelers fan, analyzed the NFL Films clip of the play. He concluded, based on the trajectory of the bounced ball and conservation of momentum, that the ball must have bounced off Tatum, who was running upfield at the time, rather than Fuqua, who was running across and down the field. Fetkovich also performed experiments by throwing a football against a brick wall at a velocity greater than 60 feet per second (18 meters per second), twice the speed Fetkovich calculated that Bradshaw's pass was traveling when it reached Tatum and Fuqua. Fetkovitch achieved a maximum rebound of 10 feet (3.0 meters) when the ball hit point first and 15 feet (4.6 m) when the ball hit belly first, both less than the 24 feet (7.3 m) that the ball rebounded during the play. Timothy Gay, a physics professor and a longtime Raiders fan, cited Fetkovich's work with approval in his book The Physics of Football and concluded that "the referees made the right call in the Immaculate Reception."

Bradshaw himself had made points similar to those of Fetkovich fifteen years earlier, stating that he did not think that he had thrown the ball hard enough for it to bounce that far back off Fuqua and that since Fuqua was running across the field, the ball would have veered to the right if it had hit him. Bradshaw opined that the ball must have bounced off the upfield-moving Tatum – if that had happened then "Tatum's momentum carries the ball backward."

== Aftermath ==
The week after this playoff victory, perhaps as some maintain it was karma for the Steelers, the Steelers lost the AFC Championship Game 21–17 to the Miami Dolphins, who went on to win Super Bowl VII in their landmark undefeated season. Had the Raiders advanced to the AFC Championship Game instead, they would have entered that contest with an all-time record (including playoffs) of 6–1–1 against the Dolphins.

Despite the loss to the Dolphins, the Steelers started to reverse four decades of futility and went on to become a dominant force in the NFL for the rest of the 1970s, winning four Super Bowls in six years with such stars as Bradshaw, Harris, John Stallworth and Lynn Swann along with the Steel Curtain defense led by Jack Ham, Jack Lambert, "Mean Joe" Greene, Mel Blount, and Dwight White.

The year 1972 was one year before the Steelers' fortieth year in the NFL, during which they had finished above .500 only nine times, and until then had never won a playoff game. In fact, before this game, the only playoff game the team had ever played was a loss to the Philadelphia Eagles in 1947 after the two teams finished tied for the Eastern Division championship. The Immaculate Reception was actually the first touchdown the Steelers ever scored in the postseason (they were shut out against the Eagles in the 1947 playoff game). They had long been regarded as one of the league's doormats (as the 1944 Card-Pitt merger was 0–10 and was ridiculed as the "Carpitts," a play on the word "carpet"). Between 1950 and 1970, the Steelers finished as high as second place once, doing so in 1962, which garnered them an exhibition game called the "Playoff Bowl". As recently as 1969, the team had posted a 1–13 record, thus securing the first draft choice in the subsequent NFL draft, in which the Steelers chose Bradshaw that seeded their remarkable turnaround. Since the AFL–NFL merger, the Steelers have the league's best record (surpassing Miami in 2007 because of the Dolphins' recent struggles), have had a league-low three head coaches, and have had only nine losing seasons, none worse than 5–11. Only twice since the Immaculate Reception has the team had losing seasons two years in a row and none three years in a row.

The Immaculate Reception spawned a heated rivalry between the Steelers and the Raiders, a rivalry that was at its peak during the 1970s, when both teams were among the best in the league and both were known for their hard-hitting, physical play. The teams met in the playoffs in each of the next four seasons, starting with the Raiders' 33–14 victory in the 1973 divisional playoffs. Pittsburgh used the AFC Championship Game victories over Oakland (24–13 at Oakland in 1974 and 16–10 at Pittsburgh in 1975) as a springboard to victories in Super Bowl IX and Super Bowl X, before the Raiders notched a 24–7 victory at home in 1976 on their way to winning Super Bowl XI. To date, the two last met in the playoffs in 1983 when the eventual Super Bowl champion Raiders, playing in Los Angeles at the time, crushed the Steelers, 38–10. The rivalry has somewhat died off in the years since, mainly due to the Raiders' on-field struggles since appearing in Super Bowl XXXVII.

The play itself started another rivalry between the Raiders and the rest of the league, as Raider fans have long thought that the league has wanted to shortchange the team and specifically owner Al Davis. In 2007, NFL Network ranked the "Raiders versus the World" as the biggest feud in NFL history.

More positively, the play ironically led to the lifelong friendship between Harris and Villapiano due to their shared Italian American heritage, despite their difference of opinions on the events of the play. A year after the play, Harris had discovered that both his mother and Villapiano's father, both Italian immigrants, hailed from the same area of the Italian Peninsula after Villapiano's father helped Harris' mother (who still wasn't fluent in English at the time) speak for her son at a banquet in their native New Jersey. This led to the two becoming friendlier away from the football field with Harris becoming an "honorary Raider" while Villapiano has accepted the events of the play over time.

For the 1978 NFL season, the NFL passed two rule changes that would have affected the Immaculate Reception had it happened today. The first one, regarding the forward pass touching an offensive player but being caught by another without touching a defender, was repealed. There are no longer any restrictions on any deflections of passes, and a future play that mirrored the Immaculate Reception would simply be an extraordinary but legal reception. Second, the NFL also passed tougher pass interference rules (ironically as a result of the "dirty" play of the Steelers' own Mel Blount, among others), which if in effect in 1972 would have penalized the Raiders regardless of the result of the play due to Tatum's hit on Fuqua; as the goal post would be at the goal line until 1974 when they were moved back to the end line, such a penalty would have placed the Steelers in relatively short field goal range for Gerela to try a game-winning field goal from 42 yards out. Whether a future Franco Harris would have been ruled as catching such a deflected football before it struck the turf is a different matter, thanks to myriad cameras and use of instant replay that is part of the present-day NFL.

As 1972 was the last year that the NFL forbade any local telecasts of home games, the game itself was not shown live on Pittsburgh NBC affiliate WIIC-TV (now WPXI), nor was it shown on nearby NBC affiliates WJAC-TV in Johnstown, Pennsylvania, WFMJ-TV in Youngstown, Ohio; WBOY-TV in Clarksburg, West Virginia; and then-NBC affiliate WTRF-TV in Wheeling, West Virginia, all of which are secondary markets to the Steelers. WICU-TV in Erie, Pennsylvania and then-NBC O&O WKYC-TV in Cleveland were the closest stations to air the game (although WIIC-TV showed the game on tape delay the following day). Starting the next year, any home games that sold out 72 hours before kick-off could be televised locally. As the Steelers began their home sell-out streak in 1972, blackouts have never been needed in the Pittsburgh area.

=== Game ball ===
The actual ball ended up in the hands of fan Jim Baker, who attended the game with his young nephew, Bobby. Baker managed to scoop up the ball during the ensuing melee after the extra point kick, grabbed his nephew, and ran off the field. He had offered to give the ball back to the Steelers in return for lifetime season tickets but was rebuffed. Until 2023, he declined every offer to sell it, including the highest offer of $150,000 from heavy equipment provider Ray Anthony International, instead keeping it in a guarded bank vault in West Mifflin, Pennsylvania and occasionally bringing it out for public appearances involving the Steelers, including one with Franco Harris in 1997 to commemorate the play's 25th anniversary. However, in 2023, Baker sold the ball to Maggie Hardy for an undisclosed amount. Plans call for the ball to be kept at Nemacolin Woodlands Resort.

In 2026, a beer was brewed using yeast culture grown from the DNA swabs taken from the ball, specifically for an NFL Draft celebration event at Nemacolin Woodlands Resort.

=== Legacy ===
The Steelers organization still considers the Immaculate Reception the greatest moment in team history. The play was documented by NFL Network's A Football Life in 2012.

On December 23, 2012, on the fortieth anniversary of the play just hours before the Steelers hosted the Cincinnati Bengals, the Steelers unveiled a monument at the exact spot where Harris made the reception at a parking lot just outside Heinz Field, where Three Rivers Stadium formerly stood. This is the third such monument that commemorates the play in the city (the others are located at the Pittsburgh International Airport and the Heinz History Center).

In the 2013–14 NFL playoffs, Seattle Seahawks' Richard Sherman deflected a pass by San Francisco 49ers quarterback Colin Kaepernick, that was intended for Michael Crabtree, which was caught by teammate Malcolm Smith to seal the Seahawks' 23–17 victory in the NFC Championship Game. The play was later dubbed "the Immaculate Deflection" (as an homage to the Immaculate Reception), and would later be voted by Seahawks fans to be the most significant play in franchise history.

For Super Bowl XLIX, Wix.com ran an ad featuring retired football players using its tools to build websites for their new businesses, including Harris who creates a fictional wedding planning website called "Immaculate Receptions" named after the famous play.

"The 100-Year Game", a short film created by the league for Super Bowl LIII, featured many current and former football stars. In it, Bradshaw is seen throwing a football across the room towards such contemporary star receivers as Larry Fitzgerald and Odell Beckham Jr. — only to see the ball tipped, and snatched by Harris just before it hits the floor.

A 2019 poll of media members by the NFL named the Immaculate Reception as the greatest NFL play in its history.

On December 24, 2022, while hosting the present-day Las Vegas Raiders to mark the fiftieth anniversary of the Immaculate Reception, Harris became only the third player in Steelers history to have his jersey retired. Harris had died four days earlier on December 20, and was originally scheduled to appear during the ceremony.

== Officials ==
- Referee: (21) Fred Swearingen
- Umpire: (88) Pat Harder
- Head linesman: (10) Al Sabato
- Line judge: (16) Royal Cathcart
- Back judge: (63) Adrian Burk
- Field judge: (55) Charley Musser

== See also ==
- 1972–73 NFL playoffs
- Raiders–Steelers rivalry
- List of nicknamed NFL games and plays
