= Joseph Hardy =

Joseph or Joe Hardy may refer to:

- Joseph Hardy (1884-1961), Belgian historian
- Joseph Hardy (director) (1929–2024), American director and performer
- Joe Hardy (politician) (born 1949), Nevada Republican
- Joseph A. Hardy III (1923–2023), American entrepreneur; founder and CEO of 84 Lumber
- Jocelyn Hardy (1945–2021), known as Joe, Canadian ice hockey player
- Joe Hardy (footballer) (born 1998), English footballer
- Joe Hardy (The Hardy Boys), fictional character in The Hardy Boys novel series
- Joe Hardy, a character in the musical Damn Yankees
