= Maggie Hardy =

American businesswoman (born 1965)

- Born: December 7, 1965 (age 60)
- Occupation: Businesswoman
- Known for: President of 84 Lumber and Nemacolin Woodlands Resort
- Spouses: Peter J. Magerko (m. 1992, divorced); Shawn Knox (m. 2019, divorced)
- Children: 1
- Father: Joseph A. Hardy III

Maggie Hardy (born December 7, 1965) is an American billionaire businesswoman and the President of 84 Lumber and Nemacolin, both founded by her father Joseph A. Hardy III (1923–2023). In 2023, Forbes estimated her personal fortune at around $4.1 billion.

== Biography ==
Maggie Hardy was the fifth of five children in her household, with her oldest brother being 20 years older. Growing up, Hardy always maintained a very close relationship with her father. She studied at West Virginia University but dropped out after two years.

She joined the family business in 1987 and was put in charge of developing Nemacolin Woodlands into a luxury resort.

In 1992, her father gave her the ownership and management of 84 Lumber when Hardy was 26. The following year, sales reached $1 billion.

84 Lumber's 2017 Super Bowl commercial had to be modified before airing because it was depicting a border wall separating a mother and child from presumed freedom, following their visibly arduous journey to it, an analogy deemed too political by Fox. Hardy stated she was "flabbergasted" by that decision for an "ad that wasn’t meant to take a political position" but just tell the story of human struggles in general. She claimed she was a "staunch supporter of President Trump and his proposed U.S.-Mexico border wall", even though the ad seemed to make a stand against the wall.

Hardy is an art collector. The works she collects are exposed within Nemacolin's walls. A whole season of The Bachelor (season 25) shot at Nemacolin made some of the art collection visible to the public. In 2022, she purchased the Immaculate Reception ball from Jim Baker as a gift for her father's 100th birthday.

== Personal life ==
In 1992, she married Peter J. Magerko, a former member of the Marine Corps and the Pennsylvania State Police. They have one son together. In September 2017, she filed for divorce.

On March 30, 2019, she married Shawn Knox in Aspen, Colorado. They later divorced in 2022.

In 2020, she bought a $16 million mansion in Boca Raton, Florida.

In 2025, she bought the Little Brave Lodge in Colorado after selling her previous Aspen home in 2023.

== Awards ==
- 2020: Career Achievement Award by Pittsburgh Business Times during the Women of Influence event
- 2025: History Maker Award by "Heinz History Center" during their 32nd annual History Makers Award Dinner on June 5, 2025.
