= Don Weiss =

American gridiron football player (1947–2010)

Profile
- Positions: Quarterback, Halfback

Personal information
- Born: January 22, 1947; Hazleton, Pennsylvania, U.S.
- Died: May 22, 2010 (aged 63); Houston, Texas, U.S.

Career information
- College: Juniata

Career history
- 1969: Winnipeg Blue Bombers
- 1970: Saskatchewan Roughriders

Donald Weiss (January 22, 1947 – May 22, 2010) was an American professional football player who played for the Winnipeg Blue Bombers and Saskatchewan Roughriders. He played college football at Juniata College. He was inducted into their athletic hall of fame in 1999. He died in 2010.
