= Nemacolin Woodlands Resort =

Resort in Pennsylvania, US

Nemacolin
- Interactive map of the Nemacolin area

General information
- Location: 1001 Lafayette Dr, Farmington, Pennsylvania
- Coordinates: 39.8047°N 79.5515°W
- Opened: September 1970 (as Nemacolin Inn); 1987 (as Nemacolin Woodlands Resort)
- Owner: Maggie Hardy

Other information
- Number of rooms: 320

Website
- http://www.nemacolin.com

Nemacolin (formerly known as Nemacolin Woodlands Resort) is a four-season resort in Farmington, Fayette County, Pennsylvania. The resort is owned by Maggie Hardy, owner and CEO of the 84 Lumber Company, and was founded by her father, Joseph Hardy.

It includes The Lodge at Nemacolin, a Tudor Revival-style hotel which is a member of the Historic Hotels of America. Located at the center of Nemacolin, it was the hunting lodge of Pittsburgh businessman Willard F. Rockwell, who had it built in 1968. The resort also includes a casino, The Casino at Nemacolin.

== History ==
The resort is named after Chief Nemacolin, a leader of the Lenape people, who in 1740 trailblazed a route through the Laurel Highlands mountains between what is now Cumberland, Maryland and Brownsville, Pennsylvania.

Pittsburgh industrialist Willard Rockwell established a private game reserve on the property called Nemacolin Trails Hunting Reserve in 1968. The Rockwells established a hunting lodge along with a golf course and airstrip. Lakes Louise (named after the wife of Rockwell's youngest son) and Carol (named after the wife of Rockwell's second son) were added and Beaver Creek was developed and stocked into a trout fishing stream. In September 1970, the hotel was opened to the public under the name Nemacolin Inn.

In 1979, the property was sold to Cordelia Scaife May, but was returned three years later to the Rockwell family when Kent Rockwell repurchased the property and opened it to the public. By 1987, the 400-acre complex consisting of one hotel and a nine-hole golf course was in bankruptcy. Joseph A. Hardy III, founder of the 84 Lumber Company, bought Nemacolin at an auction that year and reopened the complex as an upscale hotel and resort. In the following years Hardy expanded the property to encompass 2000 acres.

In 2002, Hardy transferred full ownership of the resort to his daughter, Maggie Hardy. In 2007, Nemacolin's boutique hotel, Falling Rock, received AAA Five Diamond status. In 2009 Nemacolin's fine dining restaurant, Lautrec, received a Five Star rating from the Forbes Mobile Travel Guide and held that distinction until 2015.

In 2008, the resort housed the largest wine cellar in Pennsylvania with approximately 17,000 bottles.

In July 2013, Isle of Capri Casinos opened Lady Luck Casino Nemacolin on the property, under a lease agreement with the resort. The casino operated under a Pennsylvania Class 3 "resort" gaming license, meaning that casino patrons had to first be customers of Nemacolin in order to access the casino floor—either by staying overnight at the resort, purchasing an annual membership, or purchasing a $10 resort gift card. In 2019, Churchill Downs Inc. bought the casino operating business for $100,000 from Eldorado Resorts (which had previously acquired Isle of Capri). In June 2019, Churchill Downs paid a fee of $1 million to the Pennsylvania Gaming Control Board to eliminate the access fee requirement, allowing the general public to enter the casino at no additional charge. Nemacolin's management assumed control of the casino from Churchill Downs in 2023, and it was rebranded as The Casino at Nemacolin.

In 2020, during the COVID-19 pandemic the resort was rented out as the set for the 25th season of The Bachelor.

== Dining ==
=== Upscale dining ===
- Lautrec, fine dining
- Aqueous
- Fawn & Fable

=== Casual dining ===
- PJ's Ice Cream Parlor
- Mulligans
- Dining at The Peak
- Sunset Terrace

=== Bars and Lounges ===
- The Hardy Room

== Activities ==
- Wildlife Academy
- The Nemacolin Field Club
- Winter Experiences at The Peak
- The Peak at Nemacolin
- Hardy Family Art Collection

== Golf ==
Nemacolin became host to PGA Tour event the 84 Lumber Classic in 2003. Contested on Nemacolin's Mystic Rock golf course, the event came to an end in 2006. The four winners of the 84 Lumber Classic tournaments held on Mystic Rock at Nemacolin were:

- 2003 J. L. Lewis
- 2004 Vijay Singh
- 2005 Jason Gore
- 2006 Ben Curtis

In July 2017, Nemacolin unveiled a second golf course on top of the Allegheny Mountains called Shepherd's Rock, designed by Pete Dye and Tim Liddy.

== Gallery ==
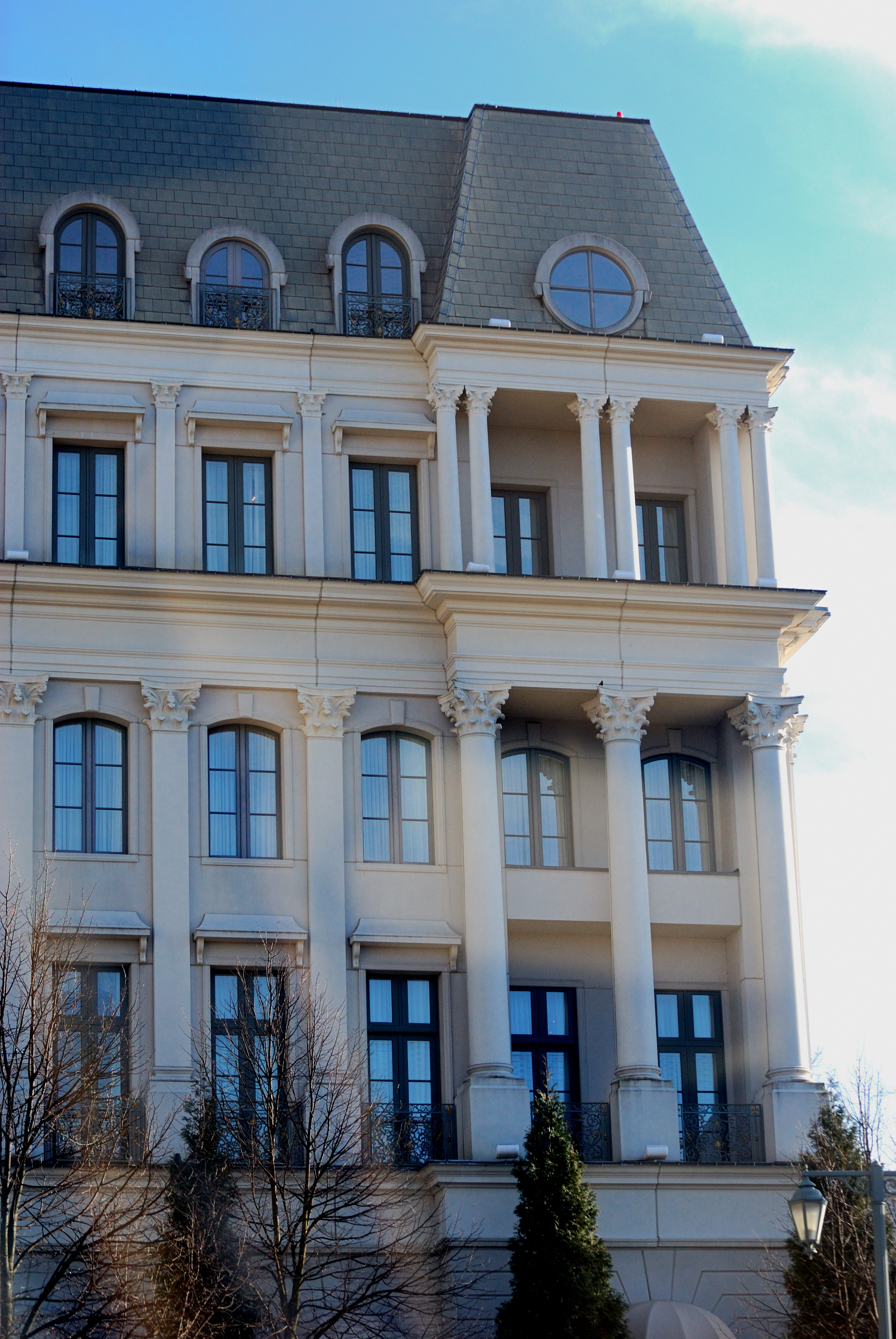
Exterior of resort

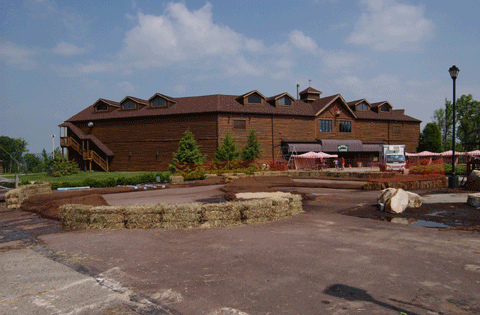
Exterior of the former ski lodge building, before it burned down.

== See also ==
- List of casinos in Pennsylvania
- List of casinos in the United States
- List of casino hotels
