= Mystic Rock =

Coordinates: 39.801479°N 79.539475°W

- Interactive map of Mystic Rock

Club information
- Location: Nemacolin Woodlands Resort
- Owner: Nemacolin Woodlands Resort
- Operator: Nemacolin Woodlands Resort
- Tournaments: 84 Lumber Classic (2003-2006)
- Website: Mystic Rock
- Designed by: Pete Dye
- Par: 72
- Course rating: 77
- Slope rating: 149

Mystic Rock is a private golf course at Nemacolin Resort in Farmington, Pennsylvania.

Golf Digest named it #75 "America’s 100 Greatest Public Courses"; #14 "Public Course in Pennsylvania"; and #22 "American’s Top 50 Courses for Women." Golfweek named it #55 "America’s 100 Best Resort Golf Courses"; #1 "Public Course in Pennsylvania"; and #2 "Best Courses You Can Play in Pennsylvania." Golf Range Magazine named it to the list of "Top 50 Public Ranges."

== Gallery ==
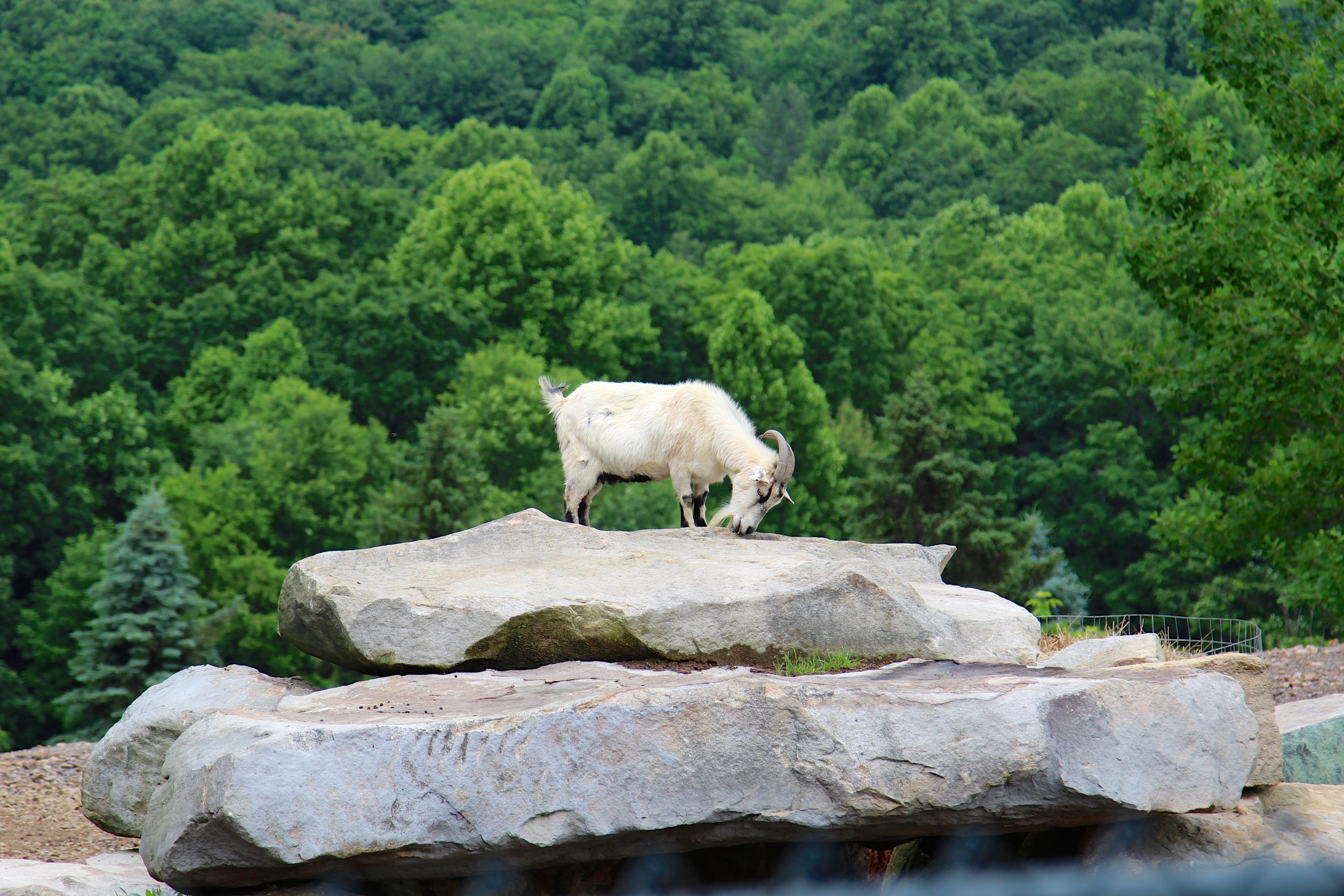
A goat at Mystic Rock (probably from the Nemacolin Woodlands Resort zoo)

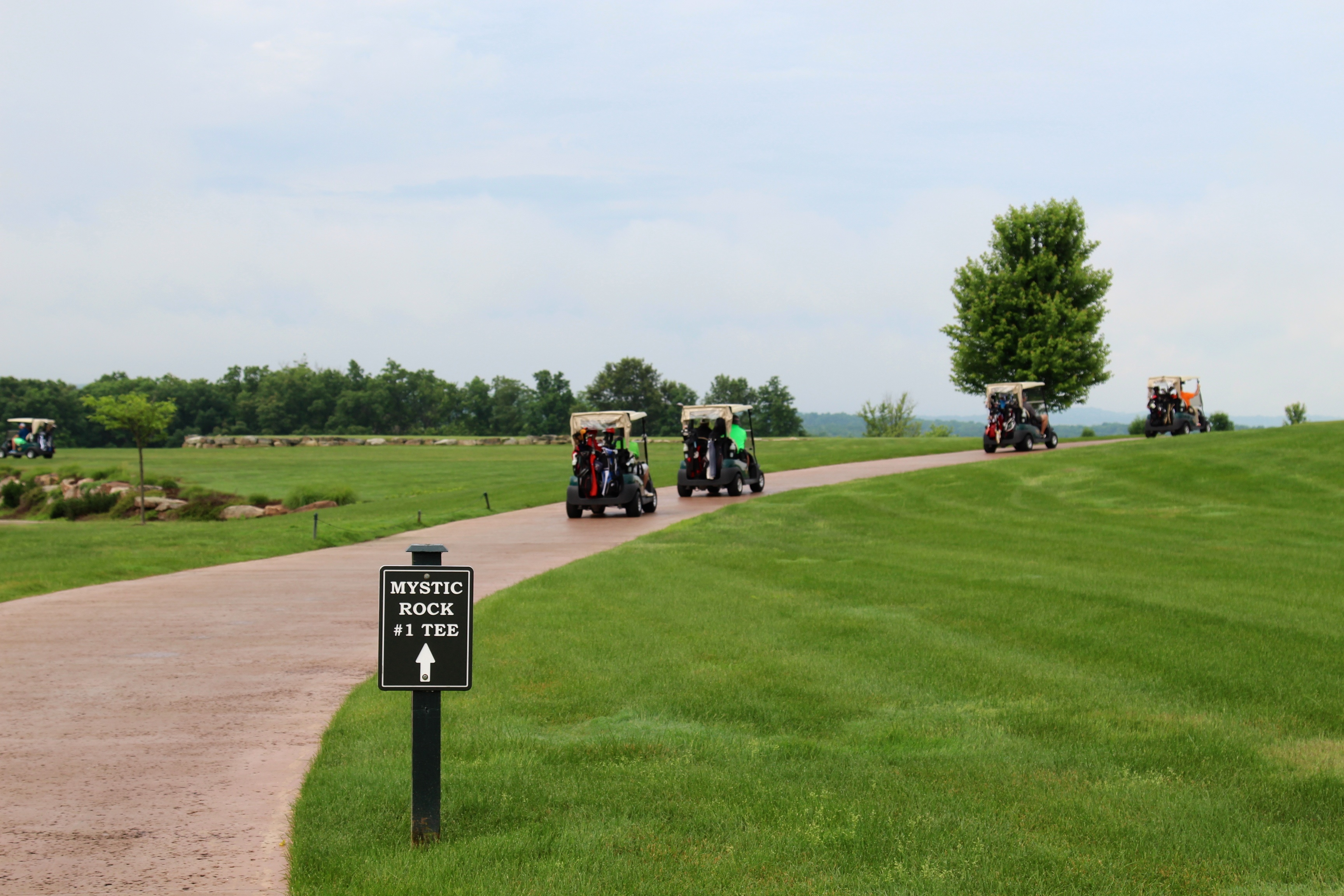
The tee box on the 1st hole

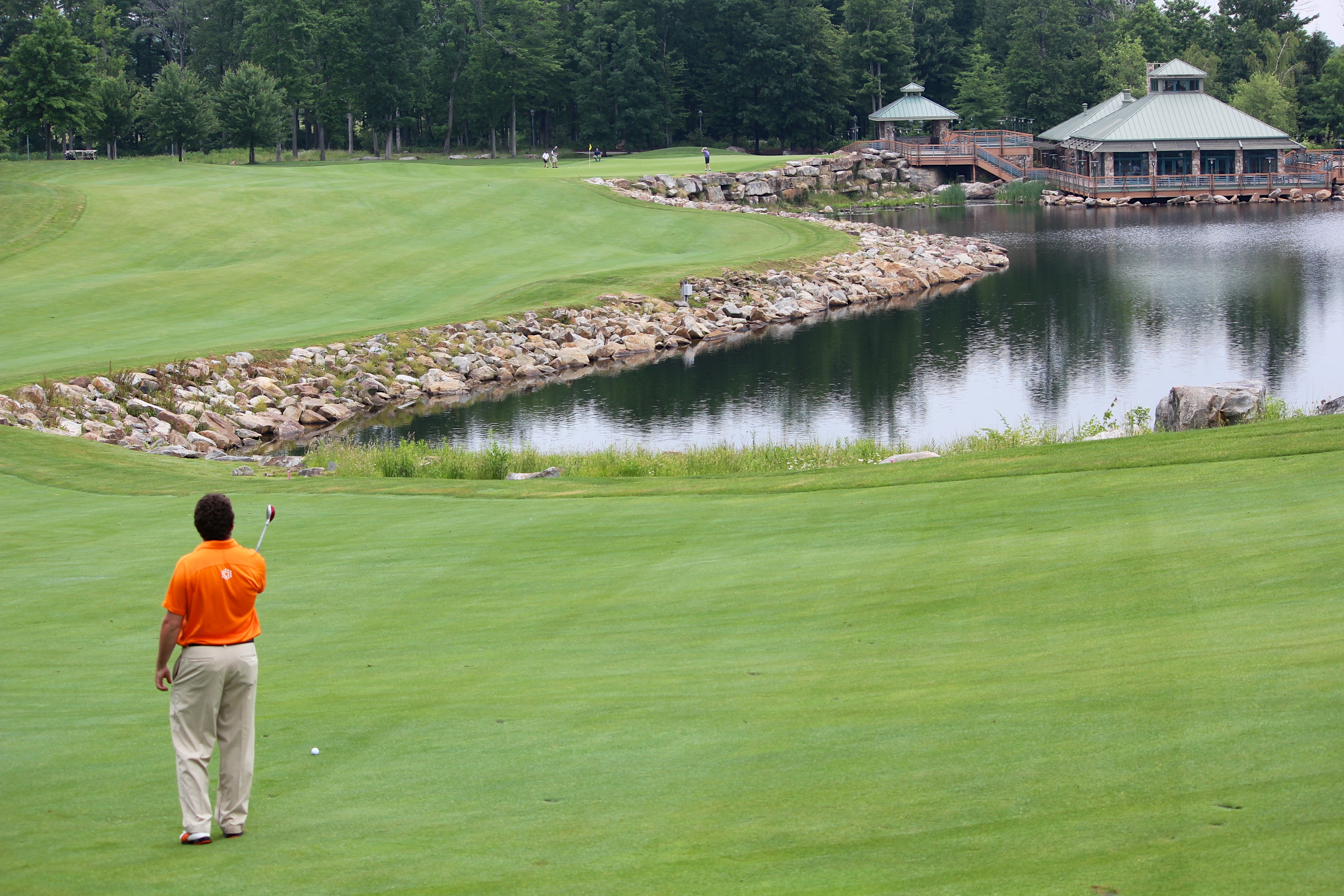
The approach to a hole with a water hazard

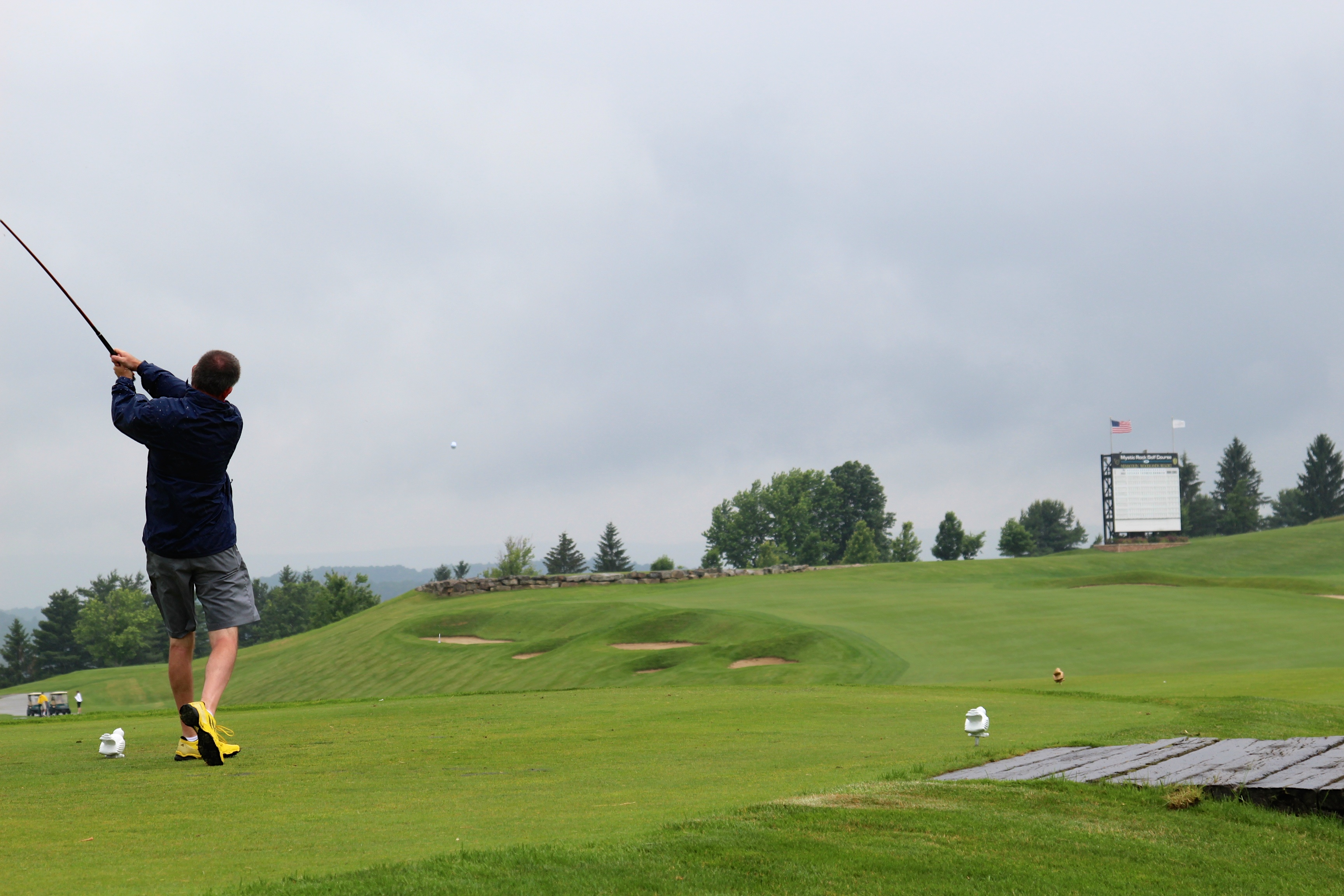
The tee box on the 17th hole
