= Vic Maitland =

American football player (1921–2019)

Victor I. Maitland
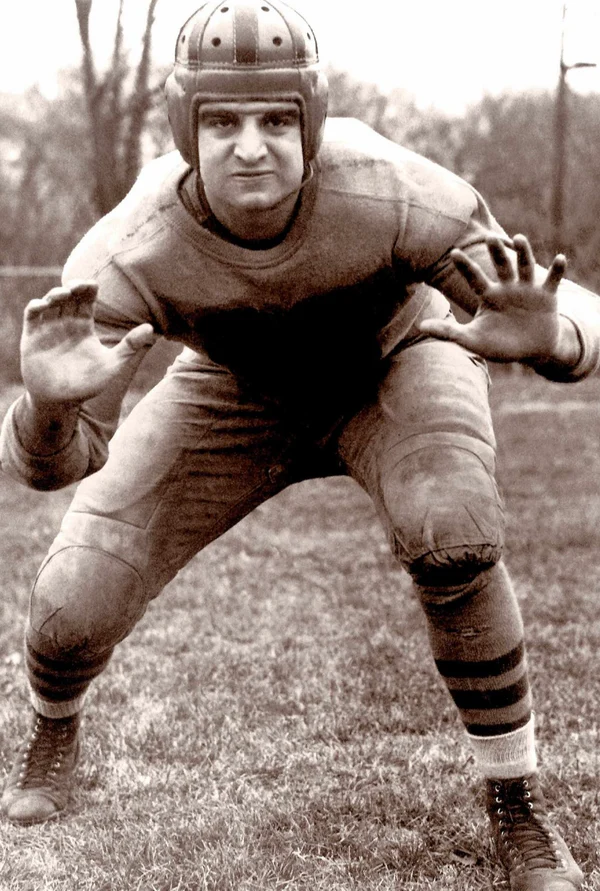
- Maitland, circa 1944

No. 46
- Position: Tackle

Personal information
- Born: March 10, 1921; Odessa, Russia
- Died: November 29, 2019 (aged 98); Jupiter, Florida, U.S.
- Listed height: 6 ft 4 in (1.93 m)
- Listed weight: 225 lb (102 kg)

Career information
- High school: Arnold Prep (Pittsburgh, Pennsylvania, U.S.)
- College: Hobart and William Smith Colleges
- NFL draft: 1944: 5th round, 37th overall pick

Career history
- Pittsburgh Steelers (1945)

Awards and highlights
- UPI Little All-American

Victor I. Maitland (March 10, 1921 – November 29, 2019) was an American football tackle.

Maitland was born in Odessa, Russia and attended Arnold Prep High School. He played college football for Hobart from 1940 to 1942.

He was a fifth-round draft choice for the New York Giants in 1944. After serving in World War II, he returned and found that he had been traded to the Pittsburgh Steelers. He soon transitioned into a career in business and sports marketing.

== NFL Alumni Association ==
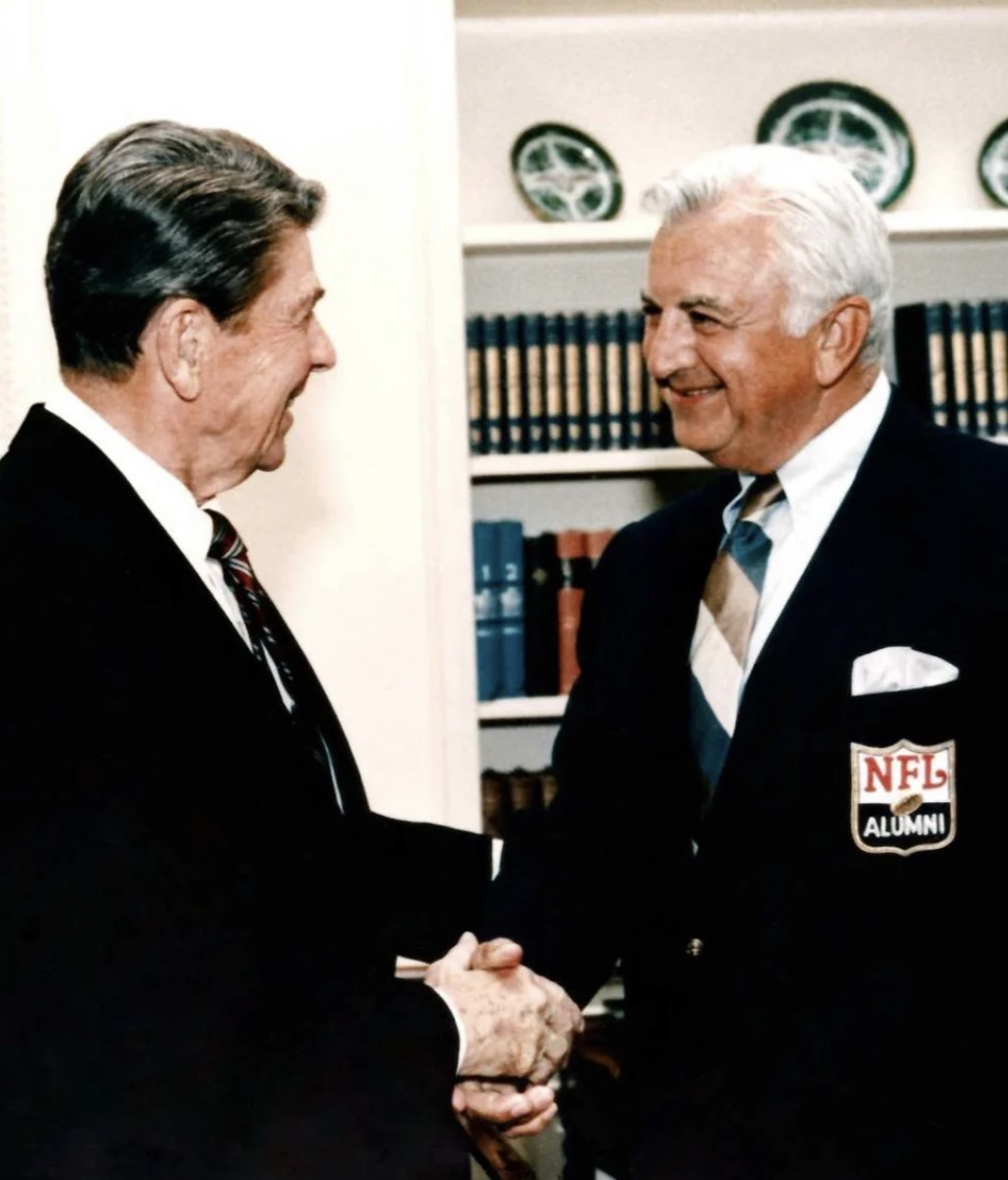
Maitland with President Ronald Reagan

=== Maitland's early leadership ===
After his playing career, Maitland became a marketing executive and later assumed a pivotal leadership role within the NFL Alumni Association. In 1977, he was appointed the organization’s first full-time chief executive officer. At that time, the association was struggling financially and organizationally. Maitland restructured it as a formal charitable and educational nonprofit institution and relocated its headquarters to Fort Lauderdale, Florida.

Under his leadership, the NFL Alumni grew to more than 30 active chapters nationwide and launched several enduring programs, including the Charity Golf Classic Tour in 1979 as its primary fundraising initiative and the Player of the Year Awards Dinner in 1982, which honored outstanding players and coaches through votes cast by former players.

He has made claims to helping establish signature traditions such as the NFL Alumni Gold Blazer presentation to Pro Football Hall of Fame inductees and the introduction of the NFL Alumni Ring in the early 1980s. Through these initiatives, Maitland played a central role in shaping the modern identity and philanthropic reach of the NFL Alumni Association.
