= Joseph A. Hardy III =

American businessman (1923–2023)

- Born: Joseph Alexander Hardy III; January 7, 1923; Upper St. Clair Township, Pennsylvania, U.S.
- Died: January 7, 2023 (aged 100); Farmington, Pennsylvania, U.S.
- Education: University of Pittsburgh
- Occupation: Businessman
- Known for: Founder of 84 Lumber, Nemacolin Woodlands Resort, and Hardy World
- Spouses: Dorothy Pierce (m. 1944; div. 1998); Debra Maley (div. 2007); Kristin Georgi (m. 2007; div. 2007); Rebecca Davis (m. 2009, divorced); Jodi Santella Williams (m. 2014)
- Children: 8, including Maggie Hardy Knox, Taylor Hardy, and Paige Hardy

Joseph Alexander Hardy III (January 7, 1923 – January 7, 2023) was an American billionaire businessman and the founder, and CEO of 84 Lumber Company and Nemacolin Woodlands Resort. At the time of his death, Hardy's net worth was estimated at $1.2 billion.

== Early life ==
Hardy was born in Upper St. Clair, Pennsylvania on January 7, 1923, and attended Mt. Lebanon High School and Shady Side Academy. After graduating from Mt. Lebanon High School, he enrolled at Lehigh University.

During his senior year at Lehigh, Hardy enlisted in the U.S. Army Air Corps and served as a radioman during World War II. After the war, Hardy worked at a family-owned jewelry store, Hardy & Hayes, while attending the University of Pittsburgh part-time. He graduated with a degree in industrial engineering.

== 84 Lumber ==
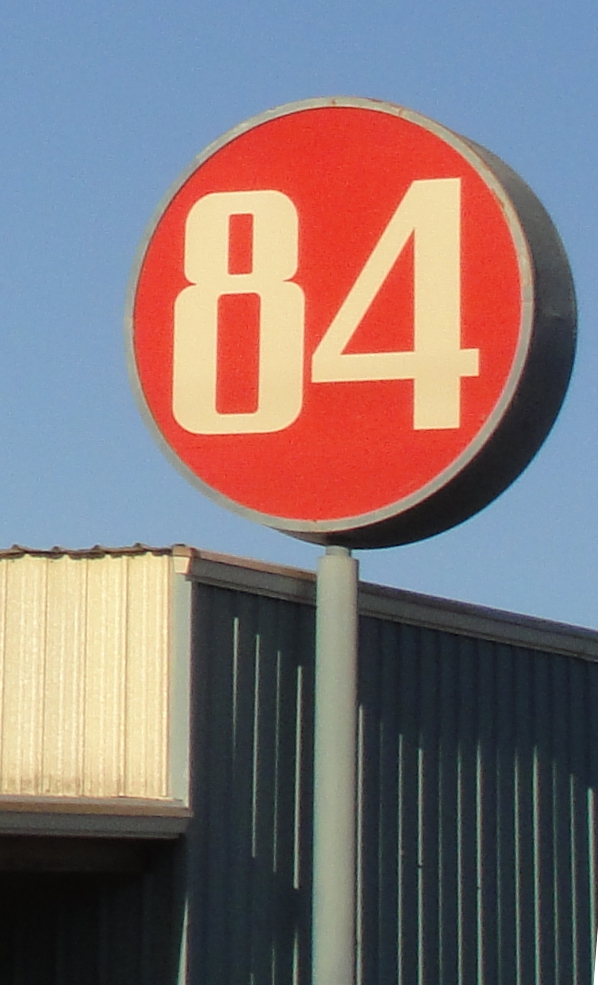
84 Lumber sign

During the 1970s, 84 Lumber's business grew and opened 229 stores. In 1984, the company undertook an expansion plan to open at least 30 new stores. Along with grand openings, stores were remodeled and renovated from no-frills lumber yards to new and improved building materials stores. In 1987, as the improvement plan generated success, the business opened their strict policy of cash-and-carry to options of using credit.

Joseph Hardy's son, Joe Jr. worked his way up through the ranks and became Chief Operating Officer at 84 Lumber, however, he was passed over as successor of the company after he became affected by multiple sclerosis. He would get tired easily and have to go home at a reasonable time to sleep, Joseph Hardy viewed this as a flaw and fired his son.

In 1992, after 34 years of running the company, Joe Hardy handed the daily responsibility of 84 Lumber to his daughter, Maggie Hardy Magerko, (later Maggie Hardy Knox) who had served as Executive Vice President. The company continued to expand, opening its 400th store in 1997.

With Hardy Magerko as leader, 84 Lumber began targeting construction customers and thus added a professional sales force, consisting of 450 new sales representatives, to the team. While this proved to be successful, the company was still facing stiff competition from big-box retail stores and saw the need to expand into the growing do-it-yourselfers crowd.

The company opened its first retail store, 84 Plus, in 1999. In an effort to appease the retail and professional customers, 84 Plus stores featured two separate sections dividing 12,000 supplies; one section was designated for contractors while the other section was designated for do-it-yourselfers. Over a hundred 84 Plus stores opened in the United States.

The early 2000s proved to be successful for 84 Lumber. In 2002, the company hit record sales and in 2004, they opened 18 new stores.

In 2008, however, 84 Lumber's profits plummeted when the housing market crashed and brought the building supplies market down with it. Vast spending and impulsive decisions contributed to a tough financial situation as well, placing 84 Lumber on the brink of bankruptcy in 2009.

The situation for the company improved some years after the crash, as the market started to bounce back. With a restructuring of the workforce and the selling of company real estate, Hardy Magerko was able to turn the company around and increase sales 27 percent from 2012 to 2013.

Following his management of the company and the transition to his daughter, Maggie, 84 Lumber became a privately held building materials supplier to professional contractors and build-it-yourselfers in the United States.

== Politics ==
Hardy announced on Sunday, September 9, 2007, at a tailgate party at Nemacolin Woodlands Resort that he was backing out of the 2007 general election for Fayette County commissioner, and thus ended his political career. Hardy finished first in vote-getting in the 2007 primary for Fayette County commissioner.

== Personal life and death ==
Hardy served in World War II in the US Army Air Corps as a communications officer in the South Pacific. He earned a degree in industrial engineering at the University of Pittsburgh's School of Engineering in 1948 and worked at his uncle's downtown Pittsburgh jewelry store before striking out into the building materials supply field at the age of 31. With his first wife (of 50 years), Dorothy Pierce, he had five children, the youngest of whom, Maggie, is now president of 84 Lumber. With his second wife, Debra Maley, he had two daughters, Taylor, and Paige. At the age of 85, Hardy married Kristin Georgi, a 22-year-old salon employee at Nemacoln Woodlands Resort. Having agreed to a pre-nuptial and wedding contract, the wedding took place on May 5, 2007, in Las Vegas, Nevada. On August 20, 2007, Hardy filed for divorce, with the petition citing "irreconcilable differences". Hardy's fourth wife was 51-year old Rebecca Davis, whom he married in December 2009. On November 21, 2014, 91 year-old Hardy married Jodi Santella Williams. They had one son together, named JJ Alexander Hardy.

Hardy has served on the University of Pittsburgh and Washington & Jefferson College Board of Trustees.

Hardy was quoted as saying, "I want to die broke. For the remainder of my life, I want to enjoy and participate in the giving of money to help improve people's lives."

Hardy died on January 7, 2023, his 100th birthday.
