= 84 Lumber =

Building materials supply company

84 Lumber Company
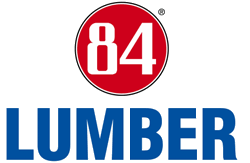
- Type: Private
- Industry: Building materials and retail
- Founded: November 14, 1956; 69 years ago
- Founder: Joe Hardy
- Headquarters: Eighty Four, Pennsylvania, U.S.
- Number of locations: 250
- Key people: Joe Hardy (founder); Maggie Hardy (president and owner)
- Products: Building materials and supplies
- Revenue: ▲$3.9 billion (2020)
- Number of employees: ~5,600
- Website: 84lumber.com

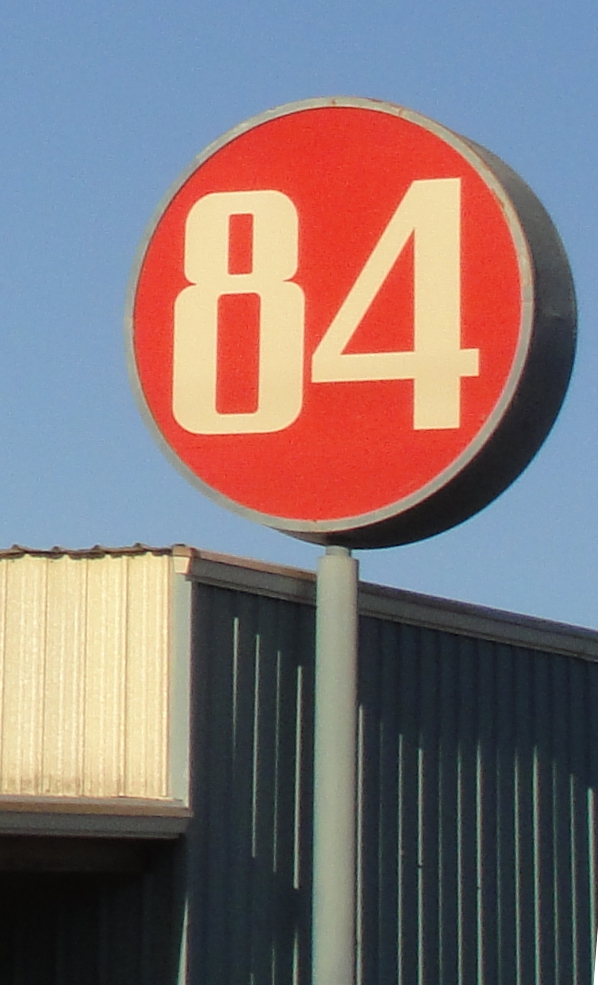
84 Lumber sign

84 Lumber is an American building materials supply company. Founded in 1956 by Joseph Hardy, it derives its name from the unincorporated village of Eighty Four, Pennsylvania, with its headquarters located in Pittsburgh. In 1992, Joe Hardy's daughter, Maggie Hardy, took over as president of the company.

As of June 2024, 84 Lumber owns and operates over 320 stores in 34 states. It is the largest privately held supplier of building materials to the construction industry.

The company operates components plants, door shops, installation centers and wood products shops. In 2020, it expanded to kitchen and bath design services with the opening of more than 30 design studios within its existing stores. The company's stores carry a variety of materials including siding, decking, windows and trim, roofing and trusses.

== History ==
Located 20 mi (32 km) south of Pittsburgh, 84 Lumber established its roots in Eighty Four, Pennsylvania, a rural community that has endured as a farmland community. 84 Lumber flourished with the funds and determination of Ed Ryan and Jack Kunkle, Joe Hardy and his two brothers Norman and Bob Hardy. Together, these men collected $84,000 for land and buildings to grow their business. As the business expanded, Hardy and his brothers became sole owners of the company.

84 Lumber established a cash and carry system; customers paid by cash or check, if merchandise was unable to be “carried” out, an additional charge was implemented to have the item personally delivered.

Throughout the 1960s, 84 Lumber continued to expand locations. This was accomplished largely by keeping overhead low and adopting a 'no frills' warehouse-style approach to most of its stores (many of which were unheated, even in cold-climate locations), as most of its clients were commercial customers not overly concerned with aesthetics. By 1981, 84 Lumber had expanded to 339 stores, 283 of which had opened within the previous 10 years, generating revenues of $478 million.

In 1984, the company undertook an expansion plan to open at least 30 new stores. Along with grand openings, stores were remodeled and renovated from no-frills lumber yards to new and improved building materials stores. In 1987, as the improvement plan generated success, the business opened its strict policy of cash-and-carry to options of using credit.

After 34 years of running the company, Joe Hardy appointed his daughter Maggie Hardy president and owner in 1992. Joe Hardy passed 40 percent of the company stock to Maggie that year as well, and added another 40 percent the following year. With a new leader, 84 Lumber continued to expand and reached $1 billion in sales for the first time in 1993 and opened its 400th store in 1997 in Ephrata, Pennsylvania.

In 1999, 84 Lumber opened its first “84 Plus” retail store in Graysville, Tennessee. The store, designed by Maggie Hardy Knox, carried about 12,000 products and was meant to increase the company's profits by selling products at a higher profit margin.

On December 7, 2002, the company exceeded $2 billion in annual sales for the first time in history. In 2004, the company opened another 18 new stores, most of which are located in metropolitan areas that had once been unprofitable.

84 Lumber suffered great losses in sales when the housing market crashed in 2009. On the brink of bankruptcy, Hardy Knox used her own personal finances and closed stores to stave off bankruptcy. Knox's efforts ultimately proved to be successful.

In 2013, 84 Lumber increased sales 27 percent over the prior year, generating $2.1 billion in revenue. Since then, the company has continued to expand and open new stores and manufacturing facilities year after year.

In 2016, 84 Lumber announced a major expansion plan on the west coast. In 2019, the company opened its largest store to-date in Chesterfield (Richmond), Virginia.

In 2017, 84 Lumber broadcast its first-ever Super Bowl ad, "The Journey", during Super Bowl LI. The advertisement chronicled the visibly arduous journey of a mother and daughter migrating from Mexico to the United States, to be then blocked by a border wall. The ad was controversial even before its premiere; prior to the game, Super Bowl LI's broadcaster Fox rejected a version of the ad that contained the border wall scene, as they felt the imagery was too politically sensitive (newly inaugurated U.S. President Donald Trump promised the construction of a wall along the entire Mexico–United States border).

== Awards ==
84 Lumber was named as one of Forbes’ Best Midsize Employers in America 2016 and Forbes’ Largest Private Companies in America 2016. In 2018, it was recognized as one of America's Largest Private Companies by Forbes and was named a Top Workplace in the Greater Pittsburgh region by Pittsburgh Post-Gazette. In 2019, it was named one of Forbes Magazine's “Best Larger Employers” and was named to INC. Magazine's “INC. 5,000” list in 2019 and 2020.

== Philanthropy ==
The Boy Scouts, Justin Jennings Foundation, Habitat for Humanity, Musicians' Village, Red Cross, and United Way are among the organizations and individuals 84 Lumber has supported over the years.

In 2019, 84 Lumber gave a total of $1.39 million in charitable donations. The same year, the company launched a national partnership with the Fisher House Foundation to show its continued support for military veterans and their families. In May 2019, the company provided $25,000 to Friends of the Pittsburgh Fisher House, and an additional $500,000 donation for the Fisher House Foundation to continue to build new houses, similar to the one underway in New Orleans.

The company made a half million dollar donation to the Pittsburgh Community Food Bank in 2020 to help its community during the coronavirus pandemic.

=== Support for U.S. military veterans ===
The company is a major partner of the Fisher House Foundation, which provides temporary housing for friends and family of those being cared for at a nearby VA hospital. As of June 2020, 84 Lumber has donated more than $1.1 million to the Foundation. The company actively recruits veterans for employment, with more than 10 percent of all employees having a military background.
