= Val Pinchbeck =

American football executive

Valjean A. Pinchbeck Jr. (February 16, 1931 – March 6, 2004) was an American football executive on both the college and professional level.

== Biography ==
Pinchbeck was born on February 16, 1931, in Syracuse, New York. Best known as an NFL broadcast official, he was known for organising the NFL schedule annually. He died while crossing a Manhattan street and subsequently hit by a cab, he was pronounced dead at the scene.

Today, the room where the NFL organises the scheduling matrix annually is known as the Valjean A. Pinchbeck Jr. Room. Pinchbeck was inducted into the Sports Broadcasting Hall of Fame in 2008 by Paul Tagliabue, with the award presented to sons James and Valjean III.
