= Farmington, Pennsylvania =

Unincorporated community in Pennsylvania, US

- Census-designated place
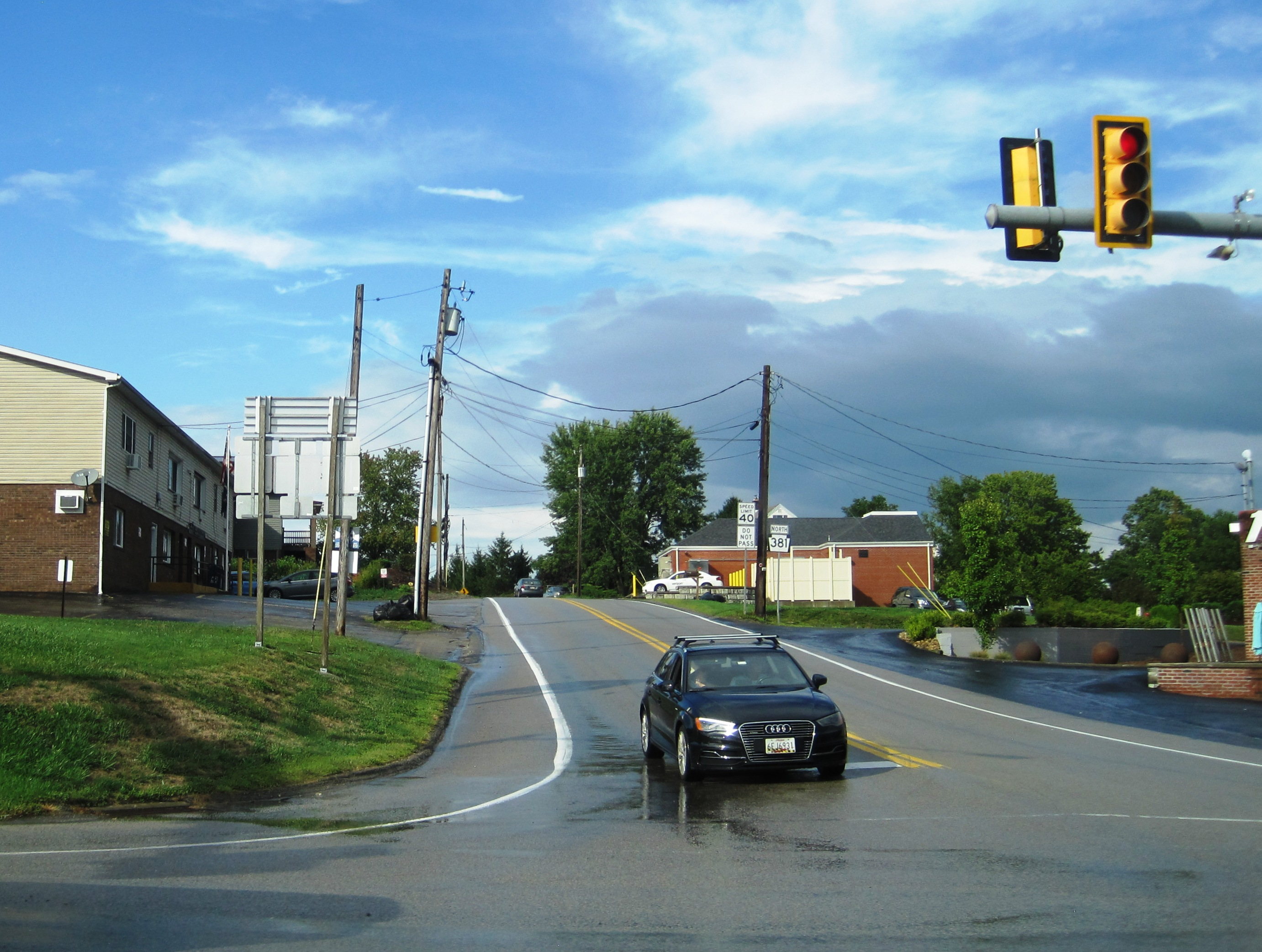
- PA 381 northbound in Farmington at US 40

- Location within Pennsylvania Location within the United States
- Coordinates: 39°48′28″N 79°34′1″W
- Country: United States
- State: Pennsylvania
- County: Fayette
- Township: Wharton

Area
  - Total: 2.59 sq mi (6.70 km^{2})
  - Land: 2.54 sq mi (6.59 km^{2})
  - Water: 0.042 sq mi (0.11 km^{2})
- Elevation: 1,831 ft (558 m)

Population (2020)
  - Total: 735
  - Density: 288.8/sq mi (111.51/km^{2})
- Time zone: UTC-5 (Eastern (EST))
  - Summer (DST): UTC-4 (EDT)
- ZIP Code: 15437
- Area codes: 724, 878
- FIPS code: 42-25280
- GNIS feature ID: 1174626

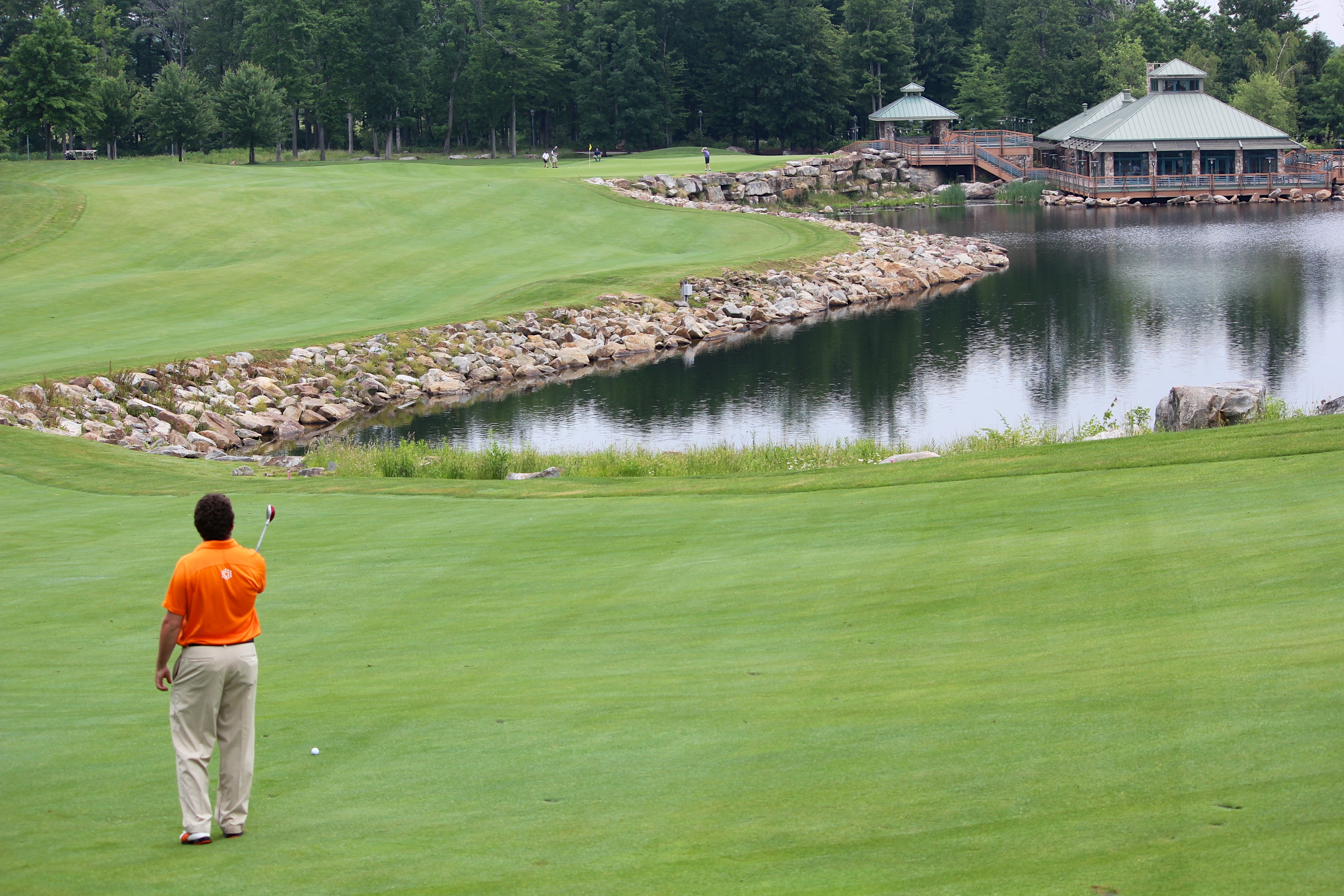
The Mystic Rock golf course at Nemacolin Woodlands Resort

Farmington is an unincorporated community and census-designated place in Wharton Township, Fayette County, Pennsylvania.

Farmington is located along U.S. Route 40, the National Road, approximately 60 miles (97 km) southeast of Pittsburgh, and is the closest settlement to Fort Necessity National Battlefield. It is also home to Historic Summit Inn Resort, the four-star Nemacolin Woodlands Resort and the New Meadow Run and Spring Valley Bruderhofs, two of a group of international Christian communities with about 200 members in each. As of the 2010 census, the population of Farmington was 767.

== Geography ==
Farmington is located in northeastern Wharton Township at geographical coordinates 39° 48′ 28″ North, 79° 34′ 1″ West (39.807220, -79.566154). Via U.S. Route 40, Uniontown, the Fayette County seat, is 12 miles (19 km) to the northwest, and Cumberland, Maryland, is 50 miles (80 km) to the southeast. Pittsburgh is 60 miles (97 km) to the northwest via US 40 and Pennsylvania Route 51.

The U.S. Postal Service ZIP Code for Farmington is 15437.

Historical population
Census	Pop.	Note	%±
2020	735		—
U.S. Decennial Census

== Notable residents ==
- William K. Naylor, US Army brigadier general, retired in Farmington

== See also ==
- Farmington Township, Clarion County, Pennsylvania
- Farmington Township, Tioga County, Pennsylvania
- Farmington Township, Warren County, Pennsylvania
- Mertztown, Pennsylvania, which includes a small village named Farmington
