= 75 Seasons: The History of the NFL =

- Developer: RealTime Sports Inc
- Initial release: 1995
- Operating system: Macintosh; Windows

75 Seasons: The History of the NFL is a software CD-ROM from RealTime Sports and NFL Films.

== Summary ==
The CD is narrated by Fox TV commentator Pat Summerall, the story is divided into 30 chapters each between 30 seconds and 5 minutes in length and contains hundreds of game clips and interviews. The archive can be searched alphabetically and by team and player.

== Development ==
75 Seasons: The History of the NFL was developed by RealTime Sports, a company founded in 1993, and produced by Steve Sabol.

== Reception ==
CNET's Matt Rosoff wrote "While the video clips of 75 Seasons might impress you, the text is mostly recycled and the interface seems thrown together without much thought. Unless you're a football fanatic, you could do better for the price." The Charlotte Observer's Steven L. Kent said "Though this documentary CD ultimately might have scored stronger with a bit less video and a superior line of statistics, it does a good job of showing the unique force that defines the National Football League".

Vince Caputo, Tom Hedden, and Dave Robidoux won an Emmy for their score of the CD.
