= Stadium (sports network) =

American sports network

- Type: OTT platform; Sports network
- Country: United States
- Broadcast area: National
- Headquarters: Chicago, Illinois

Programming
- Language: English
- Picture format: 720p/1080i (HDTV); 480i (SDTV)

Ownership
- Owner: Silver Chalice

History
- Launched: August 21, 2017; 9 years ago June 9, 2025; 16 months ago (Return to OTA)
- Replaced: American Sports Network (broadcast); Campus Insiders and 120 Sports (online); Chicago Sports Network (select OTA affiliates)
- Closed: October 30, 2023; 3 years ago (OTA only)
- Replaced by: The Nest (OTA only)

Links
- Webcast: Watch live
- Website: watchstadium.com

Availability

Streaming media
- Twitch
- Plex, Stremium, Xumo, FuboTV, Roku Channel, VidGo, YouTube TV

Stadium is an American internet television sports network owned by Silver Chalice. It is headquartered at the United Center in Chicago, Illinois.

== History ==
Stadium logo used from 2017 to 2024.

In March 2017, unconfirmed reports speculated that Sinclair was planning to shutter its sports unit, American Sports Network, and give its remaining sports rights to Campus Insiders. The Charleston Gazette-Mail, however, citing ASN employees, reported that the rumors of a complete shuttering were false, but that the division was planning to re-locate its headquarters, restructure its operations, and achieve "stronger, more diversified distribution." The original rumors were based upon reports of layoffs from ASN's current headquarters in West Palm Beach, Florida, connected to the planned re-location.

On April 13, 2017, Sinclair officially announced that ASN would be re-launched later in the year as part of a joint venture with Campus Insiders owner Silver Chalice (itself owned by the Chicago White Sox), and its online sports video service 120 Sports. The new operation will be operated as linear and digital offerings; the linear service would utilize the syndication and broadcast network built out for ASN, while the digital platform would stream full-time online and through Twitter. 120 Sports would provide original studio and long-form programming to the venture.

On May 1, 2017, it was announced that the new joint venture would be known as Stadium. On June 1, 2017, it was reported that Stadium would officially launch around late-July 2017. The service officially launched on August 21, 2017.

In 2019, with Sinclair's expansions into regional sports networks via acquisitions of Fox Sports Networks, a minority stake in YES Network, and the establishment of Marquee Sports Network with the Chicago Cubs, Sinclair CEO Chris Ripley said of Stadium's role in the expanded sports offerings: "That will be our national play. I don’t see it competing head to head with FS1 or ESPN. It's not there yet with its maturity."

In 2021, Stadium began to synergize with the rebranded Bally Sports, including co-producing an Opening Day launch special for the networks on April 1, and adopting its on-air graphics package for college sports broadcasts beginning in the 2021–22 academic season. The Fox College Sports cable channels were quietly rebranded as Stadium College Sports in June, and in 2022 Stadium began to produce the national studio show The Rally for the Bally Sports channels.

In May 2023, amid the bankruptcy of Bally Sports' parent company Diamond Sports Group, Sinclair sold its controlling interest in Stadium to Silver Chalice. Sinclair stated that the network did not have enough viewership to continue funding it. The network continued to supply some programming. As a consequence of the sale, Sinclair discontinued its distribution of Stadium in October 2023, replacing it with its new network The Nest. Stadium College Sports also ceased operations at the end of the year.

In June 2025, Stadium replaced Chicago Sports Network on some of its Illinois OTA affiliates, as CHSN was required to leave as part of its carriage agreement with Comcast.

== Distribution ==
The service is distributed mainly via streaming television services and associated apps (including third-party services, as well as Sinclair's own Stirr service). The American Sports Network linear service, which was distributed as a digital subchannel network, transitioned to Stadium on September 6, 2017. The network has also reached deals for traditional cable distribution. Stadium also offers a subscription service, "Stadium Plus", which offers access to premium events and on-demand content (including commercial-free replays of broadcasts, and classic games).

In November 2017, Facebook acquired rights to 47 college basketball telecasts from Stadium, which stream exclusively on Facebook Watch and an associated Facebook page.

In May 2018, Stadium partnered with Twitch to stream its content on the service, as well as an exclusive Twitch Stadium 2 channel that features additional commentary and analysis.

== Programming ==
Live sports airing on Stadium include Minor League Baseball, the Savannah Bananas, the A7FL, and the United Fight Alliance.

Its weekday lineup of studio programs currently include The Territory with Michael Kim, Emerge (which focuses on high school sports), Campus Insiders, and Sauce & Shram with Dave Ross and Tyler Jacobs, and The Fantasy Sportsbook.

=== Podcasts ===
- Points In The Paint Podcast – NBA focused podcast hosted by Ben Wittenstein and Zach Badger-House.

=== Past programming ===
Stadium's college sports programming at launch included events from Conference USA, the Mountain West Conference, the Patriot League, the Southern Conference, and the West Coast Conference. The Indoor Football League was carried on Stadium in 2024.

Stadium, as with other networks distributed by digital multicast networks, was required to preempt three hours of its weekly schedule for educational children's programming. With the exception of DragonflyTV, most of Stadium's educational shows are sports-related to minimize interruption; The Real Winning Edge, Sports Lab, Future Phenoms and Sports Stars of Tomorrow make up Stadium's educational lineup from 2019 to 2023, due to the network's closure on over the air television.

== Notable on-air staff ==
- Michael Kim
