= Lombardi (film) =

- Film poster
- Genre: Biography
- Based on: Vince Lombardi
- Narrated by: Liev Schreiber
- Theme music composer: David Robidoux
- Country of origin: United States
- Original language: English

Production
- Running time: 90 minutes
- Production company: NFL Films

Original release
- Network: HBO
- Release: December 11, 2010

Lombardi is a 2010 documentary film surrounding Pro Football Hall of Fame head coach Vince Lombardi produced by NFL Films and HBO. The documentary is one of three productions detailing Lombardi, along with a Broadway theatre and ESPN feature film. Besides focusing on his coaching career with the Green Bay Packers, it also details his playing days at Fordham University and being part of the Seven Blocks of Granite offensive line, along with being a high school coach and teacher at Englewood, New Jersey's St. Cecilia High School. Among the people interviewed are Lombardi's children and Hall of Famers Sam Huff, Frank Gifford, Bart Starr and Sonny Jurgensen. HBO found many of the clips in the documentary at the UCLA Film and Television Archive. The documentary was aired at Lambeau Field on November 18, the Pro Football Hall of Fame on November 27, and the College Football Hall of Fame on December 1 before airing on HBO on December 11.

The documentary won an Emmy Award for Outstanding Sports Documentary.

The documentary was re-edited into two episodes (episodes 17 and 18), as part of season three of the NFL Network documentary series, A Football Life. Although the same exact footage and interviews were used from the documentary, A Football Life, instead used the dialogue of its regular narrator, Josh Charles, in place of Liev Schreiber's narration from the HBO adaptation.

== See also ==
- Lombardi (play)
