= David Robidoux =

American score composer

- Born: Reading, Pennsylvania
- Genre: Orchestral
- Occupation: Music composer
- Years active: 1991–present
- Label: NFL Films
- Website: www.davidrobidoux.com

David Robidoux is an American score composer. He writes film scores for various sporting films and networks, and primarily composes for NFL Films.

== Career ==
Robidoux is originally from Reading, Pennsylvania. After graduating from Berklee College of Music with degrees in audio engineering and film scoring, he began working for NFL Films in 1991 as an audio engineer, and began composing alongside music director Tom Hedden, who had joined the company the year before. Their first score, 75 Seasons: The History of the NFL, earned them the Emmy Award for Best Musical Score. They would win four more Emmys for 75 Seasons, along with the productions Favre 4ever, Emmitt Smith: Run With History, NFL Century: In Their Own Words and Unitas.

Altogether, Robidoux would win nine Emmys for Outstanding Achievement in Music Composition/Direction, and was also nominated for the News and Documentary Award category for his score on Blood From A Stone, about diamonds from The Holocaust. Robidoux has since then gone on to create more than 850 compositions for NFL Films. In 2000, Robidoux worked with vocal group Boyz II Men on the song So Amazing. Four years later, Robidoux worked with music producer/mixer Alan Meyerson to compose Thunder, which became NASCAR's official theme music, the first time the association has had one. The music became used in NASCAR broadcasts starting with the 2004 NASCAR Nextel Cup Series season in copyright tags and introductions for international broadcasts. The theme would also be used in EA Sports' NASCAR video games starting with that year's NASCAR 2005: Chase for the Cup (which uses a rock version of the theme). The following year, a modified version of the music was used in the film Herbie: Fully Loaded (which mixes the “Thunder” theme with the Herbie theme) Also in 2005, Robidoux created The Lombardi Trophy Theme, which became the official theme of the Super Bowl. After the launch of NFL Network, Robidoux worked on the thematic branding of the network, and composed the theme music for Thursday Night Football, and also composed for the NFL's Major League Baseball network counterpart's Thursday Night Baseball. He also composed the score for the EA Sports video games NASCAR 2005: Chase for the Cup and Madden NFL 08. He is the composer for HBO television series Hard Knocks, with the Kansas City Chiefs edition winning him an Emmy; Robidoux again worked with HBO on the documentary Lombardi. Another television series he worked on is Nicktoons' NFL Rush Zone: Guardians of the Core. In 2007, Robidoux composed the music for America's Game: The Super Bowl Champions. In 2011, Robidoux, coordinated by NFL Senior Vice President of Events Frank Supovitz (who had worked with Robidoux to create a presentation theme for the Lombardi Trophy presentation for Super Bowl XL in 2006), wrote a musical score for NFL Films dubbed by company president Steve Sabol as Echoes of Eternity, which was played at the Pro Football Hall of Fame bust unveilments.

== Honors ==
In 1992 and 1995, Robidoux was awarded the SESAC Television Award Composer of the Year. In 1999, Robidoux received an International Monitor Award for the Philadelphia Festival of World Cinema trailer score. He also won Monitor awards for the documentary Harley Davidson and television show Grunt & Punt in engineering and sound design. He has also won Telly Awards and Aurora Awards.

== Discography ==
Original film scores

- Namath: From Beaver Falls to Broadway
- Lombardi
- Championship Chase
- The Season
- Super Six Boxing Classic
- Fight Camp 360
- Hard Knocks (2001–2010)
- America's Game: The Missing Rings
- Truth in 24
- Michael Irvin – Road To Canton
- Super Bowl Journey
- America's Game: The Super Bowl Champions
- Road To The Super Bowl (1996–2012)
- Favre 4-Ever
- Blood From A Stone
- Super Bowl I – A Wild Ride
- Emmitt Smith: Run With History
- Monday Night Football
- Unitas
- NFL Century
- History Of The U.S. Navy Football
- Summer Camp
- The Bravest Team: Rebuilding FDNY
- Vermiel
- Road To The Super Bowl
- Football America
- Big Game America
- Six Days To Sunday
- 75 Seasons
- Jolly Roger
- WWE Unreal

Opening themes

- Turning Point
- A Football Life
- Echoes Of Eternity
- NFL Draft
- Football Freakonomics
- The Season
- Showtime Sports
- Super Bowl Journey
- Hot Stove
- Inside NASCAR
- Thursday Night Baseball
- Inside The NFL
- NFL Films Presents
- Super Six Boxing Classic
- Fight Camp 360
- The Lombardi Trophy Super Bowl Theme
- Thursday Night Football
- Thunder (NASCAR – used for international broadcasts and all disclaimers)
- NFL Under The Helmet
- NFL Total Access
- NFL Films Presents
- Game of the Week in HD
- Football America
- Tailgate

Video games

- Madden NFL (2008–2013)
- EA Sports NASCAR series
