= America's Game =

America's Game may refer to:

- Army–Navy Game, a college football rivalry game also promoted as "America's Game"
- America's Game: The Super Bowl Champions, a documentary series about winners of the National Football League's championship game
- Wheel of Fortune (American game show), a television show promoted with the trademarked tagline "America's Game"
