= Namath: From Beaver Falls to Broadway =

2012 American documentary TV film

- Theme music composer: David Robidoux
- Country of origin: United States

Production
- Running time: 90 minutes

Original release
- Network: HBO
- Release: January 28, 2012

Namath: From Beaver Falls to Broadway is a 2012 documentary film focusing on Pro Football Hall of Fame quarterback Joe Namath. Namath had stated that he was reluctant in joining the project, but subsequently stated his pleasure in doing so. The film was produced by NFL Films and HBO, and aired on the latter on January 28, 2012. The film documents Namath's early life in Beaver Falls, Pennsylvania, followed by his college football career at Alabama and career under Bear Bryant. The rest of the documentary focuses on Namath's career with the New York Jets, highlighted by his Super Bowl III win over the Baltimore Colts. The film also documents Namath's struggles with his alcoholism, which ended up leading to him going to drug rehabilitation. In the end, Namath discusses the possibility of returning to Beaver Falls to celebrate the 50th anniversary of his high school's state championship. Among those interviewed for the documentary include Namath's sister Rita Sims, brother Frank, daughter Jessica, former Jets Matt Snell, Don Maynard, John Schmitt, Richard Caster, Emerson Boozer and John Riggins, along with ESPN analyst Suzy Kolber, who was involved in an incident in 2003, in which a drunk Namath asked her to kiss him.

Prior to its airing on January 28, 2012, the film was premiered at the Hotel Capstone in Tuscaloosa, Alabama by the Paul W. Bryant Museum. The film won an Emmy Award in 2013 for Outstanding Sports Documentary, beating out Dream Team, Klitschko, 26 Years: The Dewey Bozella Story and The Announcement.
