= The Perfect 10 =

- Genre: Sports; Documentary film
- Directed by: Steve Trout
- Starring: Marcus Allen; Tim Brown; Earl Campbell; Tony Dorsett; Barry Sanders; Roger Staubach; Charles Woodson
- Narrated by: Andre Braugher
- Country of origin: United States
- Original language: English

Production
- Producer: Tim Brown
- Running time: 90 minutes
- Production companies: Fox Sports Films; Hall of Fame Village Media; H2H Productions; NFL Films

Original release
- Network: Fox
- Release: February 11, 2023

The Perfect 10 is a sports documentary about the 10 Heisman Trophy winners who also got enshrined into the Pro Football Hall of Fame produced by Fox Sports Films, Tim Brown, Hall of Fame Village Media, H2H Productions, and NFL Films. The Perfect 10 premiered on February 11, 2023, at 8 P.M. on Fox, the night before Super Bowl LVII.

== Plot ==
The Perfect 10 brings together seven of the 10 legendary football players who have won the Heisman Trophy and entered the Pro Football Hall of Fame to share their life journeys to winning the Heisman Trophy and entering the Pro Football Hall of Fame. The players who sat down for this conversation are Marcus Allen, Tim Brown, Earl Campbell, Tony Dorsett, Barry Sanders, Roger Staubach, and Charles Woodson. The film examines the motivation, impact, and ability to achieve their sustained excellence while going deep into each player's life and career. The film also goes into the off-field aspects of their character and the personal details of their past that define them.

== The Perfect 10 members ==
The Perfect 10 members
Image	Name	Position	Heisman Year	Pro Football Hall of Fame Induction Year	College	NFL teams	Career highlights and awards
A picture of Doak Walker.	Doak Walker	HB	1948	1986	SMU	Detroit Lions (1950–1955)	2× NFL champion (1952, 1953); NFL Rookie of the Year (1950); 4× First-team All-Pro (1950, 1951, 1953, 1954); 5× Pro Bowl (1950, 1951, 1953–1955); 2× NFL scoring leader (1950, 1955); Pride of the Lions; Detroit Lions 75th Anniversary Team; Detroit Lions All-Time Team; Detroit Lions No. 37 retired; Maxwell Award (1947); 3× Consensus All-American (1947–1949); SMU Mustangs Jersey No. 37 honored
Top 1961 playing card of Paul Hornung.	Paul Hornung	HB	1956	1986	Notre Dame	Green Bay Packers (1957–1962; 1964–1966); New Orleans Saints (1967)	Super Bowl champion (I); 4× NFL champion (1961, 1962, 1965, 1966); NFL Most Valuable Player (1961); 2× First-team All-Pro (1960, 1961); Second-team All-Pro (1959); 2× Pro Bowl (1959, 1960); Bert Bell Award (1961); NFL rushing touchdowns leader (1960); 3× NFL scoring leader (1959–1961); NFL 1960s All-Decade Team; Green Bay Packers Hall of Fame; 2× First-team All-America (1955, 1956)
	Roger Staubach	QB	1963	1985	Navy	Dallas Cowboys (1969–1979)	2× Super Bowl champion (VI, XII); Super Bowl MVP (VI); NFL Man of the Year (1978); Second-team All-Pro (1971); 6× Pro Bowl (1971, 1975–1979); NFL passing touchdowns leader (1973); 4× NFL passer rating leader (1971, 1973, 1978, 1979); NFL 1970s All-Decade Team; NFL 100th Anniversary All-Time Team; Dallas Cowboys Ring of Honor; Bert Bell Award (1971); George Halas Award (1980); Lamar Hunt Award (2012); Maxwell Award (1963); Chic Harley Award (1963); UPI Player of the Year (1963); Sporting News Player of the Year (1963); Unanimous All-American (1963); Navy Midshipmen No. 12 retired
A picture of O.J. Simpson posing.	O. J. Simpson	RB	1968	1985	USC	Buffalo Bills (1969–1977); San Francisco 49ers (1978–1979)	NFL Most Valuable Player (1973); NFL Offensive Player of the Year (1973); 5× First-team All-Pro (1972–1976); 5× Pro Bowl (1972–1976); Bert Bell Award (1973); AP Athlete of the Year (1973); 3× UPI AFC Offensive Player of the Year (1972, 1973, 1975); 4× NFL rushing yards leader (1972, 1973, 1975, 1976); 2× NFL rushing touchdowns leader (1973, 1975); NFL scoring leader (1975); AFL All-Star (1969); NFL 1970s All-Decade Team; NFL 75th Anniversary All-Time Team; NFL 100th Anniversary All-Time Team; Buffalo Bills Wall of Fame; National champion (1967); Maxwell Award (1968); Walter Camp Award (1967); 2× UPI Player of the Year (1967, 1968); 2× Unanimous All-American (1967, 1968); USC Trojans No. 32 retired
A picture of Tony Dorsett on a phone.	Tony Dorsett	RB	1976	1994	Pittsburgh	Dallas Cowboys (1977–1987); Denver Broncos (1988)	Super Bowl champion (XII); NFL Offensive Rookie of the Year (1977); PFWA All-Rookie Team (1977); First-team All-Pro (1981); 2× Second-team All-Pro (1982, 1983); 4× Pro Bowl (1978, 1981–1983); Dallas Cowboys Ring of Honor; National champion (1976); Maxwell Award (1976); Walter Camp Award (1976); 3× First-team All-American (1973, 1975, 1976); Pittsburgh Panthers No. 33 retired; NFL record: 99-yard rushing touchdown (tied with Derrick Henry)
A picture of Earl Campbell rushing the ball.	Earl Campbell	RB	1977	1991	Texas	Houston Oilers (1978–1984); New Orleans Saints (1984–1985)	NFL Most Valuable Player (1979); 3× NFL Offensive Player of the Year (1978–1980); NFL Offensive Rookie of the Year (1978); 3× First-team All-Pro (1978–1980); PFWA All-Rookie Team (1978); 5× Pro Bowl (1978–1981, 1983); Bert Bell Award (1979); 3× NFL rushing yards leader (1978–1980); 2× NFL rushing touchdowns leader (1979, 1980); NFL 1970s All-Decade Team; NFL 100th Anniversary All-Time Team; Titans/Oilers Ring of Honor; Tennessee Titans No. 34 retired; Davey O'Brien Memorial Trophy (1977); 2× First-team All-American (1975, 1977); Texas Longhorns No. 20 retired; Texas Sports Hall of Fame; Houston Sports Hall of Fame
A picture of Marcus Allen golfing.	Marcus Allen	RB	1981	2003	USC	Los Angeles Raiders (1982–1992); Kansas City Chiefs (1993–1997)	Super Bowl champion (XVIII); Super Bowl MVP (XVIII); NFL Most Valuable Player (1985); NFL Offensive Player of the Year (1985); NFL Offensive Rookie of the Year (1982); NFL Comeback Player of the Year (1993); 2× First-team All-Pro (1982, 1985); Second-team All-Pro (1984); 6× Pro Bowl (1982, 1984–1987, 1993); 2× NFL rushing touchdowns leader (1982, 1993); NFL rushing yards leader (1985); NFL scoring leader (1982); National champion (1978); Maxwell Award (1981); Walter Camp Award (1981); Pac-10 Player of the Year (1981); Unanimous All-American (1981); Second-team All-American (1980); USC Trojans No. 33 retired
A picture of Tim Brown wearing a jersey.	Tim Brown	WR	1987	2015	Notre Dame	Los Angeles / Oakland Raiders (1988–2003); Tampa Bay Buccaneers (2004)	2× Second-team All-Pro (1996, 1997); 9× Pro Bowl (1988, 1991, 1993–1997, 1999, 2001); NFL receptions co-leader (1997); NFL kickoff return yards leader (1988); NFL 1990s All-Decade Team; PFWA All-Rookie Team (1988); Heisman Trophy (1987); Walter Camp Award (1987); Sporting News Player of the Year (1987); UPI Player of the Year (1987); Unanimous All-American (1987); NFL record: Most consecutive starts by a receiver: 176 (185 including playoffs)
A picture of Barry Sanders posing.	Barry Sanders	RB	1988	2004	Oklahoma State	Detroit Lions (1989–1998)	NFL Most Valuable Player (1997); 2× NFL Offensive Player of the Year (1994, 1997); NFL Offensive Rookie of the Year (1989); 6× First-team All-Pro (1989–1991, 1994, 1995, 1997); 4× Second-team All-Pro (1992, 1993, 1996, 1998); 10× Pro Bowl (1989–1998); 4× NFL rushing yards leader (1990, 1994, 1996, 1997); NFL rushing touchdowns leader (1991); NFL 1990s All-Decade Team; NFL 100th Anniversary All-Time Team; PFWA All-Rookie Team (1989); 2× Bert Bell Award (1991, 1997); Pride of the Lions; Detroit Lions 75th Anniversary Team; Detroit Lions All-Time Team; Detroit Lions No. 20 retired; Heisman Trophy (1988); Maxwell Award (1988); Walter Camp Award (1988); Big Eight Offensive Player of the Year (1988); Unanimous All-American (1988); Second-team All-American (1987); First-team All-Big Eight (1988); Oklahoma State Cowboys Ring of Honor
Charles Woodson	Charles Woodson	CB	1997	2021	Michigan	Oakland Raiders (1998–2005); Green Bay Packers (2006–2012); Oakland Raiders (2013–2015)	Super Bowl champion (XLV); NFL Defensive Player of the Year (2009); NFL Defensive Rookie of the Year (1998); 4× First-team All-Pro (1999, 2001, 2009, 2011); 4× Second-team All-Pro (2000, 2008, 2010, 2015); 9× Pro Bowl (1998–2001, 2008–2011, 2015); 2× NFL interceptions leader (2009, 2011); NFL 2000s All-Decade Team; PFWA All-Rookie Team (1998); Green Bay Packers Hall of Fame; Art Rooney Award (2015); National champion (1997); Heisman Trophy (1997); Walter Camp Award (1997); Bronko Nagurski Trophy (1997); Chuck Bednarik Award (1997); Jim Thorpe Award (1997); Jack Tatum Trophy (1997); Sporting News Player of the Year (1997); Big Ten Player of the Year (1997); Big Ten Defensive Player of the Year (1997); Big Ten Freshman of the Year (1995); 2× First-team All-American (1996, 1997); NFL record: Most consecutive seasons with an interception returned for touchdown: 6 (2006–2011)

== Production ==
The Perfect 10 was produced in partnership with Fox Sports Films, Hall of Fame Village Media, Heisman Trophy Winner and Pro Football Hall of Famer Tim Brown, H2H Productions and NFL Films. The Perfect 10 is directed by four-time Emmy winner Steve Trout, who also directed Hard Knocks and All or Nothing. The Perfect 10 is narrated by two-time Emmy Award-winning actor Andre Braugher, who also appeared in Thief and Brooklyn Nine-Nine. Eric Shanks, Mark Silverman, Charlie Dixon and Barry Nugent from FOX Sports also serve as executive producers.

== Release ==
The Perfect 10 premiered on February 11, 2023, the night before Super Bowl LVII at 8 P.M. on Fox
