= WWE Confidential =

American TV series or program (2002–2004)

- Created by: Vince McMahon
- Presented by: Gene Okerlund
- Country of origin: United States
- No. of episodes: 83

Production
- Running time: 60 minutes

Original release
- Network: TNN/Spike TV
- Release: May 25, 2002 – April 24, 2004

Related
- WWE Unreal

WWE Confidential, or simply Confidential, is an American professional wrestling television program produced by World Wrestling Entertainment (WWE). It aired on TNN/Spike TV late Saturday nights, following Velocity, from May 25, 2002 to April 24, 2004. It was hosted by Gene Okerlund.

As of May 18, 2020, the first 61 episodes of WWE Confidential were made available to stream on the WWE Network and NBCUniversal's Peacock streaming service in the United States.

== Format ==
Confidential was a unique program for the company, in that it was not a standard "live event" or "recap" show. Rather, it offered an exclusive, "behind the scenes" look into WWE and its talent, both in-ring and otherwise. The show was also WWE's first to periodically break kayfabe and consistently use professional wrestling slang. Confidential was discontinued in 2004 and was replaced with the WWE Experience, a more traditional weekly summary show.

A similar show to Confidential eventually returned under the name WWE Outside the Ring, but in a shortened version. The online show debuted February 2012 on WWE's YouTube channel, with new episodes uploaded on Thursdays. In 2025, a successor to Confidential debuted as WWE Unreal.

=== Notable and typical features ===
- An interview with Shawn Michaels about his life and career. This interview, an early highlight of Confidential, featured Michaels's first public admission that he was in on the Montreal Screwjob, after years of denying any involvement in it.
- An analysis of why Stone Cold Steve Austin abruptly left the company in mid-2002.
- A history of the World Heavyweight Championship, featuring interviews with past titleholders (and in the process making the disputed-by-many claim that this title shares its lineage with the WCW version).
- Segments detailing life on the road for WWE stars, including overseas tours.
- A story on how wrestlers feel when people say "Wrestling's fake." This segment was also notable because the wrestlers being interviewed admitted that wrestling is a "worked" form of entertainment rather than a legitimate athletic competition, the first time this was explicitly stated on a show produced by the WWE.
- A brief history of the Monday Night War.
- Wrestlers going out of character and using their real names for interviews.
- A report on the death of Miss Elizabeth.
- Stiffing of Matt Cappotelli by Hardcore Holly on an episode of Tough Enough III.

== DVD compilation ==
A DVD compilation of segments from this show, The Best of WWE Confidential, Vol. 1, was released in early 2003.

== See also ==
- List of WWE television programming
- AEW All Access
