= America's Game: The Super Bowl Champions =

American TV documentary series (2006– )

- Created by: NFL Films; NFL Network; Steve Sabol
- Composer: David Robidoux
- Country of origin: United States
- No. of episodes: 59

Production
- Running time: 44 minutes

Original release
- Network: NFL Network
- Release: November 17, 2006 – April 30, 2007
- Network: CBS
- Release: February 3, 2007
- Network: NFL Network
- Release: September 5, 2007 – present

America's Game: The Super Bowl Champions is an American annual documentary series created by NFL Films (broadcast on NFL Network and CBS). Its 59 installments profile the 59 winning teams of the National Football League (NFL)'s annual Super Bowl championship game; each episode chronicles an individual team.

A spin-off debuted on September 18, 2008, titled America's Game: The Missing Rings which chronicled five teams considered to be the best at the time to have not won the Super Bowl.

== Format ==
America's Game weaves together archival NFL Films footage, videotape, audio clips, and interviews into a new program with new talking head style interviews from three or more of the winning team (players, coaches, or administrators) and narration from a celebrity.

In instances of teams winning multiple Super Bowls closely together different people are interviewed for each episode. For example, though Bill Belichick coached the New England Patriots to three Super Bowls in four years (2001, 2003, and 2004) he was only interviewed for the episode on the 2004 team. For the original run of 40 episodes, only two subjects were interviewed twice: Bill Curry (1966 Green Bay Packers and 1970 Baltimore Colts) and Joe Greene (1974 and 1978 Pittsburgh Steelers). Recurring interviewers would become more commonplace when the show resumed on an annual format: Eli Manning and Tom Coughlin (2007 and 2011 New York Giants), Ray Lewis (2000 and 2012 Baltimore Ravens), Peyton Manning (2006 Indianapolis Colts and 2015 Denver Broncos), Julian Edelman (2014, 2016 and 2018 New England Patriots), LeGarrette Blount (2016 New England Patriots and 2017 Philadelphia Eagles), Rob Gronkowski and Devin McCourty (2014 and 2018 New England Patriots), Travis Kelce and Patrick Mahomes (2019, 2022, and 2023 Kansas City Chiefs). Ernie Accorsi and Rich Dalrymple are the only non-players or coaches to be interviewed for the series—both were their respective team's director of public relations (Accorsi was later promoted to general manager by the Colts).

Of the "Blue Ribbon" top 20 teams, the San Francisco 49ers and Dallas Cowboys are represented most often as a franchise with three championship teams each. The Green Bay Packers, Pittsburgh Steelers, and Oakland/Los Angeles Raiders are each represented twice.

According to Steve Sabol, president of NFL Films, only 20 teams were ranked instead of 40 because they feared negative mail from fans of the franchise whose team was ranked the lowest. Sabol stated that, while the panel chose the 1972 Dolphins as the #1 team, several voters hedged and said Miami's unbeaten season was "the greatest team achievement." Of the voting methods, Sabol said, "That's what I think people were voting on, rather than, 'Could this team beat the '85 Bears?'"

== Airing ==
For its initial airings the show was divided into two waves, with the first series being a weekly series counting down the top 20 winning teams, as selected by a 53-person panel of "Blue Ribbon" experts on the NFL. The first 18 episodes aired on NFL Network beginning in November 2006 and the final two programs on CBS the day before Super Bowl XLI in February 2007.

The remaining 20 champions' episodes aired during the NFL's off-season, February through April, before the 2007 season began. The first episode of the remaining 20 champions aired on Thursday, February 8, 2007.

The show began its run with a one-hour "preview special" at 8:30 p.m. Eastern time on November 17, 2006, followed by the first of the countdown shows the following week. The "official" premiere episode aired on November 24, the day after the first live regular season game telecast on NFL Network.

After some speculation on the future of the series, the 2006 Indianapolis Colts, winners of Super Bowl XLI had their episode air on September 5, 2007, one night before the season opener. The 2007 New York Giants also received an episode, signaling that the series would be annually renewed at the beginning of the next NFL season; annual releases have come every year since.

=== Unannounced episodes ===
- Although the 1990 New York Giants, winners of Super Bowl XXV, did not make the top 20 as chosen by the Blue Ribbon panel, their episode's debut was moved up from spring 2007 to the free-preview period of NFL Network that was offered on Cablevision and Time Warner Cable in late 2006. The program debuted on December 29 at 12:31 a.m Eastern (December 28, 9:31 p.m. Pacific). It started 31 minutes late because of the length of the Texas Bowl and a full one-hour NFL Total Access that followed. Although most participating systems were located in the New York tri-state area, some cable viewers in Kansas also received it. Alec Baldwin narrated and Ottis Anderson, Carl Banks, and Jeff Hostetler told their experiences of the season.
- The special of the 1971 Dallas Cowboys aired at 1 a.m. Eastern time December 30 (10 p.m. Pacific December 29) as part of the same preview, one week before the scheduled premiere. This was an hour behind schedule, as the Insight Bowl (that aired in place of what would have been a new episode) ended in overtime.

== Episodes ==
=== Original run (2006–2007) ===
==== Top twenty ====
The following list compiles the top 20 Super Bowl teams, as determined by the experts. The teams listed below were revealed in countdown form in the weeks leading up to Super Bowl XLI. The first 18 episodes aired on NFL Network, while the top two teams' specials were shown on CBS on February 3, the day before Super Bowl XLI. Each episode in the top 20 would be introduced with, "NFL Network presents America's Game, a countdown of the 20 greatest Super Bowl champions, and now, number ___"

Eps	Rank	Year	Team	Game	Narrator	Team Commentary	Air Date
1	20	1983	Los Angeles Raiders	Super Bowl XVIII	Alec Baldwin	Marcus Allen, Todd Christensen, and Howie Long	November 24, 2006
2	19	1999	St. Louis Rams	Super Bowl XXXIV	Martin Sheen	D'Marco Farr, Dick Vermeil, and Kurt Warner	December 1, 2006
3	18	1969	Kansas City Chiefs	Super Bowl IV	Martin Sheen	Len Dawson, Willie Lanier, and Jim Lynch	December 8, 2006
4	17	1994	San Francisco 49ers	Super Bowl XXIX	Bruce Willis	Steve Young, Brent Jones, and Merton Hanks	December 15, 2006
5	16	1996	Green Bay Packers	Super Bowl XXXI	Kevin Bacon	Brett Favre, Mike Holmgren, and Desmond Howard	December 22, 2006
6	15	1971	Dallas Cowboys	Super Bowl VI	Martin Sheen	Bob Lilly, Roger Staubach, and Duane Thomas	January 5, 2007
7	14	1991	Washington Redskins	Super Bowl XXVI	Donald Sutherland	Joe Gibbs, Mark Rypien, and Charles Mann	January 12, 2007
8	13	1986	New York Giants	Super Bowl XXI	Laurence Fishburne	Bill Parcells, Phil Simms, and Lawrence Taylor	January 19, 2007
9	12	1998	Denver Broncos	Super Bowl XXXIII	Kevin Bacon	Terrell Davis, Mark Schlereth, and Shannon Sharpe	January 26, 2007
10	11	1977	Dallas Cowboys	Super Bowl XII	Laurence Fishburne	Thomas Henderson, Tony Dorsett, Drew Pearson, and Charlie Waters	January 27, 2007
11	10	1976	Oakland Raiders	Super Bowl XI	Laurence Fishburne	John Madden, Ken Stabler, and Phil Villapiano	January 27, 2007
12	09	2004	New England Patriots	Super Bowl XXXIX	Laurence Fishburne	Troy Brown, Tedy Bruschi, and Bill Belichick	January 28, 2007
13	08	1984	San Francisco 49ers	Super Bowl XIX	Gene Hackman	Russ Francis, Keena Turner, and Dwight Hicks	January 29, 2007
14	07	1975	Pittsburgh Steelers	Super Bowl X	Bruce Willis	Lynn Swann, Dwight White, and Mike Wagner	January 29, 2007
15	06	1966	Green Bay Packers	Super Bowl I	Donald Sutherland	Bill Curry, Willie Davis, and Bart Starr	January 30, 2007
16	05	1992	Dallas Cowboys	Super Bowl XXVII	Alec Baldwin	Troy Aikman, Michael Irvin, and Ken Norton Jr.	January 31, 2007
17	04	1989	San Francisco 49ers	Super Bowl XXIV	Gene Hackman	Tom Rathman, George Seifert, and Jerry Rice	February 2, 2007
18	03	1978	Pittsburgh Steelers	Super Bowl XIII	Bruce Willis	Rocky Bleier, Mel Blount, Randy Grossman, and Joe Greene	February 2, 2007
19	02	1985	Chicago Bears	Super Bowl XX	Alec Baldwin	Mike Ditka, Jim McMahon, and Mike Singletary	February 3, 2007 on CBS
20	01	1972	Miami Dolphins	Super Bowl VII	Alec Baldwin	Manny Fernandez, Don Shula, and Larry Csonka	February 3, 2007 on CBS

==== Non-ranked ====
Beginning February 8, NFL Network began to broadcast the remaining twenty champions' episodes. The 2005 Steelers were not eligible to be in the Top 20 as the voting was done prior to Super Bowl XL.

Eps	Year	Team	Game	Narrator	Team Commentary	Air Date
21	1970	Baltimore Colts	Super Bowl V	Ed Harris	Bill Curry, Mike Curtis, Bubba Smith, and Ernie Accorsi	February 9, 2007
22	1980	Oakland Raiders	Super Bowl XV	Ed Harris	Jim Plunkett, Gene Upshaw, and Matt Millen	February 16, 2007
23	1990	New York Giants	Super Bowl XXV	Alec Baldwin	Ottis Anderson, Carl Banks, and Jeff Hostetler	December 29, 2006 re-aired February 15, 2007
24	2001	New England Patriots	Super Bowl XXXVI	Martin Sheen	Tom Brady, Lawyer Milloy, and Adam Vinatieri	February 8, 2007
25	1993	Dallas Cowboys	Super Bowl XXVIII	Ed Harris	Bill Bates, Emmitt Smith, and Jimmy Johnson	February 22, 2007
26	1979	Pittsburgh Steelers	Super Bowl XIV	Ed Harris	John Banaszak, L. C. Greenwood, and John Stallworth	February 23, 2007
27	1973	Miami Dolphins	Super Bowl VIII	Ed Harris	Dick Anderson, Bob Kuechenberg, and Mercury Morris	March 1, 2007
28	1987	Washington Redskins	Super Bowl XXII	Gene Hackman	Doug Williams, Jeff Bostic, and Darrell Green	March 2, 2007
29	1988	San Francisco 49ers	Super Bowl XXIII	Ed Harris	Bill Walsh, Harris Barton, and Roger Craig	March 8, 2007
30	1974	Pittsburgh Steelers	Super Bowl IX	Ed Harris	Franco Harris, Joe Greene, and Andy Russell	March 9, 2007
31	2000	Baltimore Ravens	Super Bowl XXXV	Alec Baldwin	Brian Billick, Trent Dilfer, and Ray Lewis	March 15, 2007
32	1995	Dallas Cowboys	Super Bowl XXX	Ed Harris	Darren Woodson, Rich Dalrymple, Daryl Johnston, and Larry Brown	March 16, 2007
33	1982	Washington Redskins	Super Bowl XVII	Alec Baldwin	Russ Grimm, Joe Theismann, and Rick Walker	March 22, 2007
34	1981	San Francisco 49ers	Super Bowl XVI	Gene Hackman	Dwight Clark, Ronnie Lott, and Randy Cross	March 23, 2007
35	1997	Denver Broncos	Super Bowl XXXII	Alec Baldwin	John Elway, Howard Griffith, and Neil Smith	March 29, 2007
36	1968	New York Jets	Super Bowl III	Alec Baldwin	Joe Namath, Gerry Philbin, and Don Maynard	April 2, 2007
37	2005	Pittsburgh Steelers	Super Bowl XL	Tom Selleck	Jerome Bettis, Joey Porter, and Bill Cowher	April 9, 2007
38	1967	Green Bay Packers	Super Bowl II	Tom Selleck	Chuck Mercein, Dave Robinson, and Jerry Kramer	April 16, 2007
39	2002	Tampa Bay Buccaneers	Super Bowl XXXVII	Laurence Fishburne	Warren Sapp, Jon Gruden, and John Lynch	April 23, 2007
40	2003	New England Patriots	Super Bowl XXXVIII	Tom Selleck	Charlie Weis, Rodney Harrison, and Willie McGinest	April 30, 2007

=== Annual specials (2007–present) ===
Following the original 40-episode run, America's Game resumed in an annual format. Beginning with Super Bowl XLI and the 2006 Indianapolis Colts, a new episode would air each September, usually the day before the regular season started, in order to commemorate the reigning Super Bowl Champions. Each episode would feature a celebrity narrator who was a fan of the team, or was from the area where the reigning champions reside. The new episodes would air on NFL Network.

Eps	Year	Team	Game	Narrator	Team Commentary	Air Date
41	2006	Indianapolis Colts	Super Bowl XLI	Donald Sutherland	Peyton Manning, Tony Dungy, and Jeff Saturday	September 5, 2007
42	2007	New York Giants	Super Bowl XLII	James Gandolfini	Eli Manning, Tom Coughlin, and Michael Strahan	September 3, 2008
43	2008	Pittsburgh Steelers	Super Bowl XLIII	Jon Hamm	Ben Roethlisberger, Mike Tomlin, and Troy Polamalu	September 9, 2009
44	2009	New Orleans Saints	Super Bowl XLIV	Brad Pitt	Sean Payton, Drew Brees, and Jonathan Vilma	September 8, 2010
45	2010	Green Bay Packers	Super Bowl XLV	John Slattery	Mike McCarthy, Aaron Rodgers, and Charles Woodson	September 7, 2011
46	2011	New York Giants	Super Bowl XLVI	Alec Baldwin	Eli Manning, Victor Cruz, Tom Coughlin, and Justin Tuck	September 4, 2012
47	2012	Baltimore Ravens	Super Bowl XLVII	Edward Norton	Joe Flacco, John Harbaugh, and Ray Lewis	September 2, 2013
48	2013	Seattle Seahawks	Super Bowl XLVIII	Jim Caviezel	Russell Wilson, Richard Sherman, and Pete Carroll	September 3, 2014
49	2014	New England Patriots	Super Bowl XLIX	Chris Evans	Rob Gronkowski, Julian Edelman, and Devin McCourty	September 8, 2015
50	2015	Denver Broncos	Super Bowl 50	Trey Parker	DeMarcus Ware, Von Miller, and Peyton Manning	September 7, 2016
51	2016	New England Patriots	Super Bowl LI	Chris Evans	LeGarrette Blount, Julian Edelman, and Dont'a Hightower	September 6, 2017
52	2017	Philadelphia Eagles	Super Bowl LII	David Boreanaz	Carson Wentz, Nick Foles, Brandon Graham, and LeGarrette Blount	September 5, 2018
53	2018	New England Patriots	Super Bowl LIII	John Cena	Julian Edelman, Devin McCourty, Jason McCourty, and Rob Gronkowski	September 4, 2019
54	2019	Kansas City Chiefs	Super Bowl LIV	Paul Rudd	Patrick Mahomes, Travis Kelce, and Tyrann Mathieu	September 9, 2020
55	2020	Tampa Bay Buccaneers	Super Bowl LV	John Cena	Mike Evans, Devin White, and Leonard Fournette	September 8, 2021
56	2021	Los Angeles Rams	Super Bowl LVI	Bryan Cranston	Andrew Whitworth, Matthew Stafford, and Aaron Donald	September 7, 2022
57	2022	Kansas City Chiefs	Super Bowl LVII	Paul Rudd	Patrick Mahomes, Travis Kelce, and Chris Jones	September 6, 2023
58	2023	Kansas City Chiefs	Super Bowl LVIII	Paul Rudd	Patrick Mahomes, Travis Kelce, Chris Jones, and Andy Reid	September 4, 2024
59	2024	Philadelphia Eagles	Super Bowl LIX	Bradley Cooper	Nick Sirianni, Jalen Hurts, Zack Baun, and Saquon Barkley	September 3, 2025
60	2025	Seattle Seahawks	Super Bowl LX	Kelsey Grammer	Sam Darnold, Ernest Jones IV, and Mike Macdonald	August 29, 2026

== The Missing Rings ==
America's Game: The Super Bowl Champions
- Also known as: America's Game: The Missing Rings
- Created by: NFL Films; NFL Network; Steve Sabol
- Composer: David Robidoux
- Country of origin: United States
- No. of episodes: 5

Production
- Running time: 44 minutes

Original release
- Network: NFL Network
- Release: September 18 – October 16, 2008

A spinoff series, America's Game: The Missing Rings, debuted on September 18, 2008 and aired for five consecutive Thursdays after that, starting at 10 p.m. ET. In this series, the producers picked five very good teams that came close to winning it all but finished short of Super Bowl victories, and devoted an hour to each of them. The basic format of the show was the same. However, the theme song cut off abruptly before the show started, symbolizing the unfinished goals of the teams being profiled.

=== Episodes ===
Eps	Year	Team	Narrator	Team Commentary	Air Date
1	1981	San Diego Chargers	Tom Selleck	Dan Fouts, Hank Bauer, and Kellen Winslow	September 18, 2008
2	1969	Minnesota Vikings	Tom Selleck	Jim Marshall, Joe Kapp, and Bud Grant	September 25, 2008
3	1990	Buffalo Bills	Alec Baldwin	Marv Levy, Jim Kelly, and Darryl Talley	October 2, 2008
4	1988	Cincinnati Bengals	Jeffrey Wright	Boomer Esiason, Sam Wyche, and Tim Krumrie	October 9, 2008
5	1998	Minnesota Vikings	James Gandolfini	Dennis Green, Cris Carter, and John Randle	October 16, 2008

== Availability outside of NFL Network ==
- The episodes for the #1-ranked and #2-ranked Super Bowl champion teams first aired on CBS on February 3, 2007, the day before Super Bowl XLI. They were reshown on NFL Network, with slightly more footage, on February 5.
- On January 30, 2007, iTunes made twelve episodes (#20 through #9 of the countdown) available for purchase at US $1.99 an episode or US$29.99 for the top twenty teams' episodes. All episodes, including the "Missing Rings" episodes, are now available.
- During the top-20 countdown portion of the series, episodes were individually made available on DVD on the NFL's official web store, NFLShop.com, the day after their debut. Each episode's DVD art features a close-up of the team's Super Bowl ring.
- Currently, the only format available is Full Frame DVD. The program was filmed and broadcast in high definition but the DVD collection has been formatted as full frame.
- Sky Sports began airing the show in August 2007.
- In Australia, America's Game was previously shown on Network Ten and One HD, but is now aired by 7mate in support of its NFL broadcast rights.
- Hulu reached a deal with the NFL and had almost every episode of America's Game viewable for free on their website. As of late 2012, the series is no longer on Hulu.
- This series has aired on the Televisa Deportes cable network in Mexico in recent years.
- TSN airs America's Game in Canada.
- Gaora Sports airs America's Game in Japan.
- In Australia, Channel One HD played America's Game during the 2011–2013 NFL seasons. 7Mate took over for the 2014 Season but have only showed 2 episodes just prior to Super Bowl XLIX. After Super Bowl XLIX, 7Mate started airing episodes every Saturday from 6 AM. Currently, 7Mate is screening all episodes in the series in order at 9 AM each weekday (although, for no apparent reason, at least two of those episodes were skipped and remain unaired).
