= A Football Life =

American television series

- Genre: Documentary
- Created by: NFL Films; NFL Network
- Narrated by: Josh Charles
- Theme music composer: David Robidoux
- Country of origin: United States
- Original language: English
- No. of seasons: 10
- No. of episodes: 116

Original release
- Network: NFL Network
- Release: September 15, 2011 – present

A Football Life is an American documentary series of 127 episodes, developed by NFL Films and aired on NFL Network that documents the lives of select National Football League (NFL) players, coaches, owners, and teams. Friends, teammates, family members and other players and coaches associated with the subjects are interviewed.

== History ==
The name of the series originated in a quote from Steve Sabol of NFL Films:

For a company that prides itself on telling good stories, this is one hell of a story. Dad makes the Hall of Fame. Son's going to be his presenter. Son gets a brain tumor. Now the story is, Is the son going to be there? Will the son make it? Who knows? I could be around until the Super Bowl in New York [2014]. But I've had a lot of time to think ... So they talk about heaven, and I don't know what is waiting for me up there. But I can tell you this: Nothing will happen up there that can duplicate my life down here. That life cannot be better than the one I've lived down here, the football life. It's been perfect.

Originating as an NFL Network special on the career of Bill Parcells in November 2010, it premiered as an episodic series on September 15, 2011, with the first part of Bill Belichick's documentary. Unlike most episodes, the episode on Belichick was a two-hour documentary, and focused specifically on the 2009 season; Belichick agreed to be wired for sound for the entire season. The documentary was viewed by about 657,000 viewers, the most-watched documentary in NFL Network's history, and was the second-most watched program in Boston at the time with 151,000 viewers, trailing behind a Boston Red Sox game.

Season Two began on September 12, 2012, with The Faces of Tebow.

The series was nominated for an Emmy Award for "Outstanding Edited Sports Series/Anthology" and "Outstanding Promotional Announcement – Episodic" for Belichick's episode in 2012.

Season One was eventually released on DVD.

== Episodes ==
=== Season One ===
No.	Subject	Original air date
1	Bill Belichick	September 15, 2011
2	Bill Belichick	September 22, 2011
3	Reggie White & Jerome Brown	September 29, 2011
4	Kurt Warner	October 6, 2011
5	Walter Payton	October 13, 2011
6	Ed Sabol	October 20, 2011
7	Mike Ditka	October 27, 2011
8	Tom Landry	November 3, 2011
9	Al Davis	November 11, 2011

=== Season Two ===
No.	Subject	Original air date
1	Tim Tebow	September 12, 2012
2	Ray Lewis	September 19, 2012
3	Tom Coughlin	September 26, 2012
4	Cleveland '95	October 3, 2012
5	The Fearsome Foursome	October 10, 2012
6	Steve McNair	October 17, 2012
7	Eddie DeBartolo	October 24, 2012
8	Chris Spielman	October 31, 2012
9	Jimmy Johnson	November 7, 2012
10	John Riggins	November 21, 2012
11	Barry Sanders	December 5, 2012
12	Marcus Allen	December 12, 2012
13	The Immaculate Reception	December 19, 2012

=== Season Three ===
No.	Subject	Original air date
1	LaDainian Tomlinson	September 3, 2013
2	Don Shula	September 10, 2013
3	Darrelle Revis	September 17, 2013
4	Derrick Thomas	September 24, 2013
5	Steve Sabol	October 1, 2013
6	Matt Millen	October 8, 2013
7	Michael Strahan	October 15, 2013
8	Pat Summerall	October 22, 2013
9	Warren Sapp	October 29, 2013
10	Randall Cunningham	November 5, 2013
11	Cris Carter	November 12, 2013
12	The Forward Pass	November 19, 2013
13	Steve Gleason	November 26, 2013
14	The Great Wall of Dallas	December 3, 2013
15	Houston '93	December 10, 2013
16	Marty Schottenheimer	December 17, 2013
17	Vince Lombardi	December 24, 2013
18	Vince Lombardi	December 31, 2013
19	Tiki & Ronde Barber	January 7, 2014
20	Bill Parcells	January 14, 2014
21	Jerry Smith	January 21, 2014
22	Jerry Rice	January 28, 2014

=== Season Four ===
Season Four was announced for September 10, 2014.

No.	Subject	Original air date
1	"Mean Joe" Greene	September 12, 2014
2	Brandon Marshall	September 19, 2014
3	Sean Taylor	September 26, 2014
4	Warren Moon	October 3, 2014
5	Eric Dickerson	October 10, 2014
6	Doug Flutie	October 17, 2014
7	Terrell Davis	October 24, 2014
8	Ricky Williams	October 31, 2014
9	Earl Campbell	November 7, 2014
10	The Perfect Backfield (Csonka, Kiick & Morris)	November 14, 2014
11	Lyle Alzado	November 21, 2014
12	Dick Butkus & Gale Sayers	November 28, 2014
13	Roger Staubach	December 5, 2014
14	Keenan McCardell & Jimmy Smith	December 19, 2014
15	2006 Rose Bowl	January 2, 2015
16	Bill Walsh	January 23, 2015
17	Joe Namath	January 30, 2015

=== Season Five ===
Season Five began on September 18 at 9 pm, and it had 13 new episodes including Terrell Owens, Dick Vermeil, Paul Brown, and more.

No.	Subject	Original air date
1	Christian Okoye	September 18, 2015
2	Dexter Manley	September 25, 2015
3	Jerome Bettis	October 2, 2015
4	Terrell Owens	October 9, 2015
5	Alan Page	October 16, 2015
6	Steve Largent	October 23, 2015
7	Dick Vermeil	October 30, 2015
8	Paul Brown	November 6, 2015
9	Mike Singletary	November 13, 2015
10	Charles Haley	November 19, 2015
11	Bruce Arians	December 11, 2015
12	Marshall Faulk	December 18, 2015
13	Ken Stabler	December 25, 2015

=== Season Six ===
Season Six premiered Friday, September 16 at 9:00 PM ET and aired 13 new episodes starting with the story of Pro Football Hall of Fame running back Curtis Martin, and including Brett Favre, Chuck Noll, and Jim Brown.

Two mini-episodes were released on the NFL's official YouTube channel. In contrast to the television series, these two episodes feature fictional characters Rod Tidwell and Frank Cushman from the movie Jerry Maguire, with Cuba Gooding Jr. and Jerry O'Connell reprising their roles. The Tidwell episode used footage from the film, while Cushman's used edited footage of Brian Griese from the NFL Films archives.

No.	Subject	Original air date
1	Curtis Martin	September 16, 2016
2	Rodney Harrison	September 23, 2016
3	Chad Johnson	September 30, 2016
4	Steve Young	October 7, 2016
5	Brett Favre	October 21, 2016 (Note: This episode first aired on CBS.)
6	Pat Tillman	October 28, 2016
7	Michael Vick	November 4, 2016
8	Jim Brown	November 10, 2016
9	Steve Smith Sr.	November 18, 2016
10	Chuck Noll	November 25, 2016
11	Troy Aikman	December 2, 2016
12	Charles Woodson	December 9, 2016
13	Kevin Greene	December 16, 2016

=== Season Seven ===
Season Seven of A Football Life premiered on Friday, September 15 at 9:00 PM ET and subsequently aired 13 episodes beginning with the former Miami Dolphins quarterback Dan Marino. Other episodes featured former Oakland Raiders coach John Madden, former Buffalo Bills quarterback Jim Kelly, Dallas Cowboys owner Jerry Jones, and former Washington Redskins coach and current NASCAR owner Joe Gibbs.

No.	Subject	Original air date
1	Dan Marino	September 15, 2017
2	Emmitt Smith	September 22, 2017
3	John Madden	September 29, 2017
4	Wes Welker	October 6, 2017
5	Sam Mills	October 13, 2017
6	Jim Kelly	November 3, 2017
7	Larry Fitzgerald	November 10, 2017
8	Eddie George	November 17, 2017
9	Joe Gibbs	November 25, 2017
10	Jerry Jones	December 1, 2017
11	Aeneas Williams	December 9, 2017
12	John Randle	December 15, 2017
13	Lynn Swann & John Stallworth	December 22, 2017

=== Season Eight ===
Season Eight of A Football Life premiered on Friday, September 14, 2018, at 9:00 PM ET and subsequently aired 11 episodes. It featured Mike Holmgren, Dwight Clark and The Catch, Lawrence Taylor, Thurman Thomas, Carson Palmer, Brian Dawkins, Doug Williams, Willie McGinest, Cris Collinsworth, Tony Romo, and Bill Cowher.

No.	Subject	Original air date
1	Carson Palmer	September 14, 2018
2	Lawrence Taylor	September 21, 2018
3	Tony Romo	September 28, 2018
4	Willie McGinest	October 5, 2018
5	Brian Dawkins	October 12, 2018
6	Dwight Clark	November 2, 2018
7	Bill Cowher	November 9, 2018
8	Mike Holmgren	November 16, 2018
9	Cris Collinsworth	November 23, 2018
10	Doug Williams	December 7, 2018
11	Thurman Thomas	December 14, 2018

=== Season Nine ===
Season Nine premiered on Friday September 13, 2019, and the episodes included Hall of Famers Terry Bradshaw, Tony Gonzalez, Bruce Smith, and Ronnie Lott.

No.	Subject	Original air date
1	Terry Bradshaw	September 13, 2019
2	Tony Gonzalez	September 20, 2019
3	Ronnie Lott	November 1, 2019
4	Bruce Smith	November 29, 2019

=== Season Ten ===
Season Ten premiered on September 17, 2021.

No.	Subject	Original Air Date
1	Nick Saban	September 17, 2021
2	James Harrison	September 24, 2021
3	Calvin Johnson	October 1, 2021
4	Drew Pearson	December 3, 2021
5	John Lynch	December 24, 2021

=== Season Eleven ===
Season 11 premiered on September 16, 2022.

No.	Subject	Original Air Date
1	Joe Theismann	September 16, 2022
2	Rod Woodson	September 23, 2022
3	Edgerrin James	November 18, 2022
4	Julian Edelman	November 25, 2022
5	Franco Harris	December 23, 2022
6	The 1972 Miami Dolphins	January 13, 2023
7	DeMarcus Ware	November 17, 2023
