= Pat Summerall =

American football player and sportscaster (1930–2013)

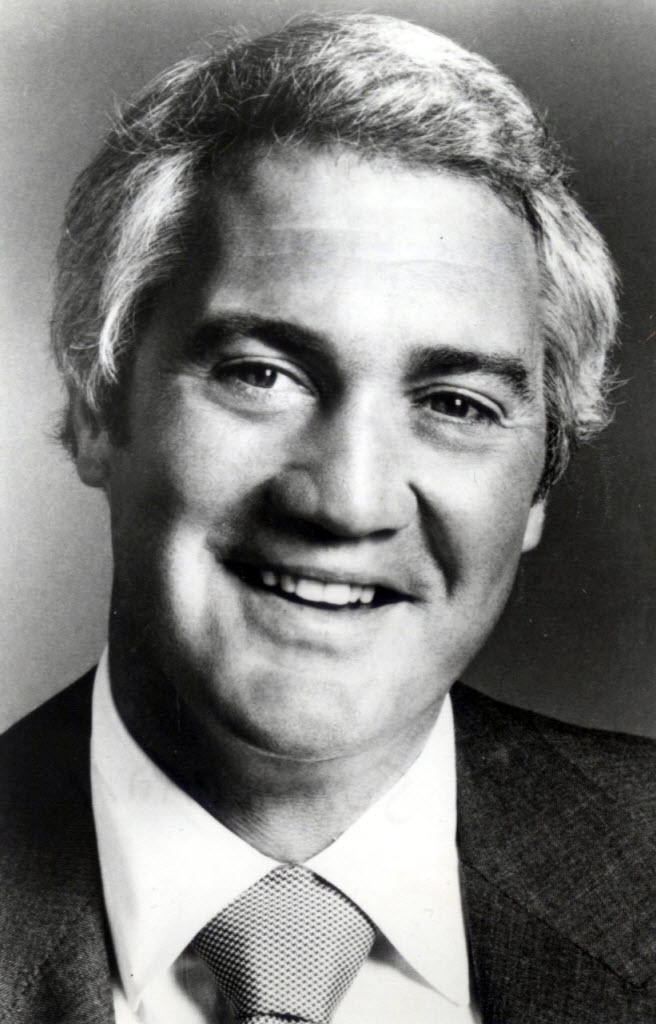
- Summerall in 1979

No. 84, 83, 85, 21, 88
- Positions: Placekicker, defensive end, end

Personal information
- Born: May 10, 1930; Lake City, Florida, U.S.
- Died: April 16, 2013 (aged 82); Dallas, Texas, U.S.
- Listed height: 6 ft 4 in (1.93 m)
- Listed weight: 228 lb (103 kg)

Career information
- High school: Columbia (Lake City)
- College: Arkansas (1949–1951)
- NFL draft: 1952: 4th round, 45th overall pick

Career history
- Detroit Lions (1952); Chicago Cardinals (1953–1957); New York Giants (1958–1961)

Awards and highlights
- NFL champion (1952)

Career NFL statistics
- Field goals attempted: 212
- Field goals made: 100
- Field goal percentage: 47.2
- Longest field goal: 50
- Extra points: 257/265 (97.0%)
- Stats at Pro Football Reference

George Allen "Pat" Summerall (May 10, 1930 – April 16, 2013) was an American professional football player and television sportscaster who worked for CBS, Fox, and ESPN. In addition to football, he announced major golf and tennis events. Summerall announced 16 Super Bowls on network television (more than anyone else), 26 Masters Tournaments, and 21 US Opens. He contributed to 10 Super Bowl broadcasts on CBS Radio as a pregame host or analyst.

Summerall played football for the Arkansas Razorbacks and then in the National Football League (NFL) from 1952 through 1961. He was drafted by the Detroit Lions and played with Bobby Layne. His best playing years were as a kicker with the New York Giants. In 1962 he joined CBS as a color commentator. He worked with Tom Brookshier and then John Madden on NFL telecasts for CBS and Fox. Retiring after the 2002 NFL season, he occasionally announced games, especially those near his Texas home.

Summerall was named the National Sportscaster of the Year by the National Sportscasters and Sportswriters Association in 1977, and inducted into its Hall of Fame in 1994. That year, he also received the Pete Rozelle Radio-Television Award from the Pro Football Hall of Fame. He was inducted into the American Sportscasters Association Hall of Fame in 1999. The Pat Summerall Award has been presented since 2006 during Super Bowl weekend at the NFL's headquarters hotel "to a deserving recipient who through their career has demonstrated the character, integrity and leadership both on and off the job that the name Pat Summerall represents."

== Early life ==
Summerall acquired the nickname "Pat" after his parents divorced when he was a child. He was taken in by an aunt and uncle who had a son named Mike. "My aunt and uncle just started calling me Pat to go with their Mike", Summerall would say, referencing frequently named characters in Irish jokes told during that time.

== Football career ==
=== High school ===
At Columbia High School, Lake City, Florida, Summerall played football, tennis, baseball, and basketball. Basketball was his favorite sport; he was recognized as an All-State selection in basketball and football. He was inducted into the FHSAA Hall of Fame and was later named to the FHSAA's All-Century Team.

=== College ===
Summerall played college football from 1949 to 1951 at the University of Arkansas before leaving early for the NFL. He played defensive end, tight end, and placekicker for the Arkansas Razorbacks. An education major, he graduated in 1953 and later earned a master's degree in Russian history, according to ESPN.

=== Professional ===
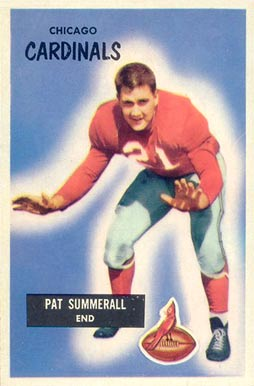
Summerall on a 1955 Bowman football card

Summerall spent 10 years as a professional football player in the National Football League, primarily as a placekicker. The Detroit Lions drafted Summerall as a fourth-round draft choice in the 1952 NFL draft. Summerall played the pre-season with the Lions before breaking his arm, which ended his season after playing just two games for the Lions. After that season, he was traded to the Chicago Cardinals where he played from 1953 to 1957 and the New York Giants from 1958 to 1961, during which he was a part of The Greatest Game Ever Played. His best professional year statistically was 1959, when Summerall scored 90 points on 30-for-30 (100%) extra-point kicking and 20-for-29 (69%) field goal kicking.

Summerall's most memorable professional moment may well have been at the very end of the December 14, 1958, regular-season finale between the Giants and the Cleveland Browns at Yankee Stadium. Going into the game, the Browns were in first place in the Eastern Conference, holding a one-game lead over the second-place Giants. And the great Jim Brown was on the Cleveland roster. In that era, there was no overtime during regular-season games, standings ties were broken by a playoff, and there were no wild-card teams. This meant that only the Eastern Conference champion would qualify for the NFL Championship Game to be held two weeks later, and it meant that the Giants had to win just to force a tiebreaker playoff game. The Browns, on the other hand, needed only a tie to clinch the Eastern championship. As time was running out, the Giants and Browns were tied, 10–10. The Giants got barely into Cleveland territory, and with two minutes left sent out Summerall to try for a tiebreaking 49-yard field goal. In spite of swirling winds and snow, Summerall, a straight-ahead kicker, kept the Giants alive for another week - who went on to beat Cleveland a week later, 10–0, in the Eastern Conference tiebreaker playoff before losing the sudden-death league championship final to Baltimore the following week.

Summerall had missed a mere 31-yard attempt a few minutes earlier. The Giants' offensive coach, Vince Lombardi, was against sending Summerall in, but gleefully greeted Summerall as he came off the field, "You son of a bitch, you can’t kick it that far!" Sports Illustrated ran the story as one of its primary articles the next week, with a leading photograph showing the football heading between the uprights through the snow.

Summerall's last professional game was the 1961 NFL Championship Game at Lambeau Field in Green Bay. Lombardi's Green Bay Packers defeated the Giants, 37–0, holding New York to just six first downs.

== NFL career statistics ==
Legend
	Won the NFL Championship
	Led the league
**Bold**	Career high

=== Regular season ===
Year	Team	GP	Field goals			Extra points			Points
Year	Team	GP	FGA	FGM	Pct	XPA	XPM	Pct	Points
1952	DET	2	0	–	–	0	–	–	0
1953	CHC	12	24	9	37.5	23	23	**100.0**	50
1954	CHC	12	18	8	44.4	23	21	91.3	45
1955	CHC	11	19	8	42.1	25	23	92.0	47
1956	CHC	12	22	10	45.5	30	30	**100.0**	60
1957	CHC	12	17	6	35.3	26	24	92.3	42
1958	NYG	12	23	12	52.2	30	28	93.3	64
1959	NYG	12	29	**20**	**69.0**	30	30	**100.0**	**90**
1960	NYG	12	26	13	50.0	32	32	**100.0**	71
1961	NYG	**14**	**34**	14	41.2	**46**	**46**	**100.0**	88
Career		111	212	100	47.2	265	257	97.0	557

=== Postseason ===
Year	Team	GP	Field goals			Extra points			Points
Year	Team	GP	FGA	FGM	Pct	XPA	XPM	Pct	Points
1952	DET	0	Did not play due to injury						
1958	NYG	**2**	2	2	**100.0**	**3**	**3**	**100.0**	9
1959	NYG	1	**3**	**3**	**100.0**	1	1	**100.0**	**10**
1961	NYG	1	0	–	–	0	–	–	0
Career		4	5	5	100.0	4	4	100.0	19

== Broadcasting career ==
In the early 1960s, Summerall was the morning host on WCBS (AM) radio in New York City. He left the job when WINS went all-news in 1965. He also co-hosted the syndicated NFL Films series This Week in Pro Football in the late 1960s and early 1970s. Summerall was also associated with a production company in Dallas from about 1998 through 2005 which was called Pat Summerall Productions. He was featured in and hosted various production shows, such as Summerall Success Stories and Champions of Industry. These qualified production segments would air on the Fox News Channel and later, CNN Headline News.

During the mid-1990s, Summerall hosted the "Summerall-Aikman" Cowboys report with quarterback Troy Aikman. Summerall served as the host of Sports Stars of Tomorrow and Future Phenoms, two nationally syndicated high school sports shows based out of Fort Worth, Texas.

=== CBS Sports ===
==== NFL ====
After retiring from football, Summerall was hired by CBS Sports in 1962 to work as a color commentator on the network's NFL coverage. CBS initially paired Summerall with Chris Schenkel on Giants games; three years later he shifted to working with Jim Gibbons on Washington Redskins games. In 1968, after CBS abandoned the practice of assigning dedicated announcing crews to particular NFL teams, Summerall ascended to the network's lead national crew, pairing with Jack Buck and then Ray Scott. For the postgame coverage of the very first Super Bowl at the end of the 1966 season (which was simulcast by CBS and NBC), the trophy presentation ceremony was handled by CBS' Summerall (who worked as a reporter, while CBS' game coverage was called by Ray Scott, Jack Whitaker and Frank Gifford) and NBC's George Ratterman.

In 1969, Summerall took part in NBC's coverage of Super Bowl III. NBC used Summerall to provide an "NFL perspective" on the coverage, as in those pre-merger days NBC was the network television provider of the American Football League (while CBS was the network television provider for the National Football League). In return, CBS Radio's coverage of Super Bowls I, II and IV, used Tom Hedrick, normally the radio voice of the Kansas City Chiefs, to provide an "AFL perspective" for its coverage.

Midway through the 1974 NFL season, CBS shifted Summerall from color to play-by-play on the network's #1 NFL crew, alongside analyst Tom Brookshier (with whom he had previously worked on This Week in Pro Football). The Summerall-Brookshier duo worked Super Bowls X, XII, and XIV together. Summerall, Brookshier, NFL on CBS producer Bob Wussler, and Miami Dolphins owner Joe Robbie appeared as themselves during the 1977 film Black Sunday, which was filmed on location at the Orange Bowl in Miami during Super Bowl X.

In 1981, Summerall was teamed with former Oakland Raiders coach John Madden, a pairing that would last for 21 seasons on two networks and become one of the most well-known partnerships in television sportscasting history. Summerall was initially opposed, preferring his longtime broadcast partner (and close friend) Brookshier, but CBS executives thought Brookshier and Summerall working together exacerbated their respective issues with alcohol. Summerall and Madden were first teamed on a November 25, 1979, broadcast of a Minnesota Vikings–Tampa Bay Buccaneers game due to Brookshier having a family commitment. The pair went on to call Super Bowls XVI, XVIII, XXI, XXIV, and XXVI for CBS.

In contrast to John Madden's lively, verbose persona, Summerall continued the traditionally minimalist delivery of his predecessor as CBS's main NFL announcer, Scott, allowing the pictures and his baritone-like voice to tell the story.

Summerall's last game alongside Madden for CBS (before the NFC television contract moved over to Fox) was the 1993 NFC Championship Game (which saw the Dallas Cowboys defeat the San Francisco 49ers in Irving, Texas to go to Super Bowl XXVIII against the Buffalo Bills in Atlanta).

==== Other CBS Sports assignments ====
Summerall hosted a morning drive-time music/talk program for WCBS-AM radio in New York through 1966. He also covered other events such as professional golf, tennis, boxing, bowling, and the American Basketball Association (ABA).

Summerall broadcast PGA Tour golf tournaments on CBS, including the Masters Tournament, as well as the tennis US Open, during his tenure at CBS with Tony Trabert, and he was the play-by-play announcer for the 1974 NBA Finals (working alongside Rick Barry and Rod Hundley), CBS' first season broadcasting the NBA on CBS. In 1975, Summerall hosted the Pan American Games in Mexico, and in 1976 he teamed with Tom Brookshier to call some heavyweight boxing matches for CBS.

Summerall broadcast his first Masters in 1968, when he anchored the coverage at hole 18. In 1983, Summerall replaced Vin Scully (who had left CBS to work for NBC on their Major League Baseball and golf coverage) in the 18th hole tower role (a role that Scully was in since 1975). Summerall's broadcast partner during this period was Ken Venturi.

From 1969–1973, Summerall broadcast CBS' National Invitation Tournament coverage with Don Criqui. In 1985, Summerall once again called college basketball, working NCAA men's tournament games for CBS with Larry Conley.

In 1970, Summerall and then-Boston Bruins' TV announcer Don Earle did a short postgame segment from inside the team's dressing room at the end of CBS' coverage of the fourth (and what turned out to be the final) game of the 1970 Stanley Cup Finals. WSBK-38, the Bruins' TV flagship at the time, simulcast the CBS coverage and did a longer post-game locker-room segment after CBS' coverage ended.

Summerall also called at least one Professional Bowlers Association event, which was the 1975 Brunswick World Open.

On April 15, 1987, Summerall did color commentary alongside Steve Stone for a Chicago Cubs–Pittsburgh Pirates baseball game on WGN-TV. This was during time period in which the Cubs' normal television announcer, Harry Caray, was recovering from a stroke. Thus, for about the first two months of the 1987 season, WGN featured a series of celebrity guest announcers on game telecasts while Caray recuperated.

He broadcast the US Open Tennis Tournament for CBS with Tony Trabert for 25 years.

Summerall's last on-air assignment for CBS Sports was the 1994 Masters Tournament.

=== Fox Sports ===
In 1994, the Fox network surprised NFL fans by outbidding CBS for the NFC broadcast package. One of Fox's first moves was to hire Summerall and Madden as its lead announcing team. While at Fox, the pair called Super Bowls XXXI, XXXIII, and XXXVI together. The long-time partnership ended after Super Bowl XXXVI in early 2002, as Summerall had announced he would be retiring from announcing and Madden's contract had expired.

Between CBS and Fox, Summerall called 11 Super Bowls on television play-by-play, a record matched by Al Michaels with Super Bowl LVI in 2022.

Summerall was lured out of retirement and re-signed with Fox for the 2002 season. However, since Madden had left to take over the color commentator position on Monday Night Football from Dan Fouts and Dennis Miller for ABC and Fox had promoted Joe Buck to be its number one NFL play-by-play voice (Buck was initially partnered with Cris Collinsworth and, since 2004, Troy Aikman, who both replaced Madden as Fox's lead NFL color commentators), Summerall was paired with Brian Baldinger on regional telecasts. Most of the games Summerall covered featured the Dallas Cowboys, due in part to his residency in the city. One of the games Summerall called was the Cowboys' game against the Seattle Seahawks at Texas Stadium, in which Emmitt Smith broke Walter Payton's career rushing yardage record. Summerall was joined by Daryl Johnston, who at the time was working as Fox's #2 color man with Dick Stockton and who was a longtime teammate of Smith's with the Cowboys, for this game.

Summerall retired again following the 2003 season. In 2006, to prepare him for his return to announcing at the Cotton Bowl Classic, he served as a substitute for Kenny Albert alongside Baldinger for the Week 8 (October 29) game between the eventual NFC champion Chicago Bears and the San Francisco 49ers. Summerall returned for one game the following year to take Stockton's place alongside Baldinger and provide the play-by-play for the December 9, 2007 game between the Cincinnati Bengals and St. Louis Rams in Cincinnati.

From 2007 until 2010, Summerall appeared as the play-by-play voice of the network's coverage of the Cotton Bowl. Summerall teamed with Brian Baldinger on the 2007–09 Cotton Bowl Classic telecasts, and worked with Daryl Johnston on the 2010 game (his final play-by-play assignment of any kind) between Ole Miss and Oklahoma State. In 2011, Summerall appeared on the pregame coverage of the Cotton Bowl.

=== Post-Fox ===
In the 2000s, Summerall provided voiceover sponsorship credits for the CBS Masters golf telecasts, and voice-overs for game coverage on NFL Network. He also provided game commentary for the Golden Tee Golf video game series and narrated the first episode of the WrestleMania Rewind series for the WWE Network (a role that would be assumed by Gary Thorne upon Summerall's death).

==== NFL on ESPN ====
Summerall called several preseason and early regular-season NFL games for the ESPN network in 2004, substituting for regular announcer Mike Patrick while the latter recovered from heart surgery.

==== Sports Stars of Tomorrow ====
As previously mentioned, Summerall hosted this syndicated program dedicated to high school and collegiate athletics from 2005 to 2012. Charles Davis assumed hosting duties in 2012.

=== Awards and honors ===
The National Sportscasters and Sportswriters Association named Summerall National Sportscaster of the Year in 1977, and inducted him into its Hall of Fame in 1994. Summerall was the 1994 recipient of the Pete Rozelle Radio-Television Award, bestowed by the Pro Football Hall of Fame "for longtime exceptional contributions to radio and television in professional football". In 1999, he was inducted into the American Sportscasters Association Hall of Fame.

Since 2006, the "Pat Summerall Award" has been presented at the annual Legends for Charity Luncheon given on Super Bowl weekend at the NFL's headquarters hotel in the host city. The award is given "to a deserving recipient who through their career has demonstrated the character, integrity and leadership both on and off the job that the name Pat Summerall represents." Honorees have included Greg Gumbel (2007), Jim Nantz (2008), Chris Berman (2009), Cris Collinsworth (2010), Al Michaels (2012), Joe Buck (2015), and John Madden (2016).

== Outside sports broadcasting ==
For many years Summerall was a commercial spokesperson for True Value hardware, often ending advertisements with his tag line "and tell 'em Pat Summerall sent you". At the same time, his long-time broadcast partner Madden was the spokesperson for Ace Hardware, True Value's main competitor in the franchised hardware store market. Summerall served as the longtime radio spokesman for the Dux Beds company, a Swedish maker of mattresses, and its "Duxiana" stores.

Summerall started doing work as a commentator for the Madden NFL video game franchise in the game John Madden Football '92. His voice was subsequently featured in all the games in the Madden franchise from 1994–2002.

Summerall provided commentary for 75 Seasons: The History of the NFL.

Summerall also provided commentary, alongside Madden, on Cartoon Network's annual Super Bowl parodies, The Big Game, from 1998 through 2001.

Summerall was name-checked on The Simpsons in the episode "Springfield Up", where his caricature and name appear on the cover of a book held by Homer Simpson titled "Smut Yuks." Summerall and his partner John Madden also appeared in (and lent their voices to) the Simpsons episode "Sunday, Cruddy Sunday", which premiered following the duo's broadcast of Super Bowl XXXIII on Fox in 1999, and on the same night, a caricature of Summerall appeared on the Family Guy premiere episode "Death Has a Shadow", although in the Family Guy episode, he was voiced by Wally Wingert. The pair also featured in the film The Replacements, calling the games of the Washington Sentinels on their run to the playoffs.

== Personal life ==
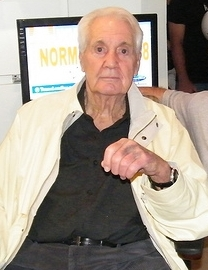
Summerall in 2008

Summerall was married twice, first to Katherine Jacobs (m.1955; div. 1995), with whom he raised three children: Susan (1957), Jay (born 1958/1959), and Kyle (born 1962/1963). The oldest, Susan, became a Republican political consultant and the first female White House chief of staff for President Donald Trump.

He was married to Cherilyn Burns from 1996 until his death. He had 10 grandchildren.

Summerall was a Christian. In his book, Summerall: On and Off the Air, he wrote about his faith and his recovery from alcoholism saying, "My thirst for alcohol was replaced by a thirst for knowledge about faith and God. I began reading the Bible regularly at the Betty Ford treatment center, and it became a part of my daily life."

=== Health issues ===
Summerall was born with a right foot that faced backward. An orthopedic physician in Lake City, Florida, Harry Bates, corrected the deformity when Summerall was just a few weeks old.

During the 1990 season, Summerall's alcoholism caused him to be hospitalized with a bleeding ulcer after vomiting on a plane during a flight after a Chicago Bears–Washington Redskins game, and he was out for a considerable amount of time. In April 1992, he began a 33-day rehab program at the Betty Ford Clinic. According to his memoir, Pat Summerall: On and Off the Air, he read the Bible and the Book of AA. He routinely attended Alcoholics Anonymous meetings and was able to resume his career in his 60s before retiring in 2002 at age 71.

In spring 2004, Summerall underwent a liver transplant. In 2006, Summerall underwent cataract surgery and had an intraocular lens implanted. In January 2008, Summerall had a hip replacement surgery. On June 19, 2008, he was hospitalized for internal bleeding caused by a new medicine he was taking.

In September 2018, a claim was filed against the NFL for football-related dementia on behalf of Cherilyn Summerall, Summerall's widow. The lawsuit was settled a year later.

=== Death ===
Summerall died of cardiac arrest at age 82 on April 16, 2013, at Zale Lipshy Hospital in Dallas, Texas, while recovering from surgery on a broken hip. After his death, Jerry Jones referred to Summerall as "royalty in the broadcast booth" while Madden called him "a great broadcaster and a great man" and added that "Pat Summerall is the voice of football and always will be." Fellow broadcasters Jim Nantz and Verne Lundquist also made statements on Summerall's life.

A few days later, CBS Sports presented a tribute to Summerall during their coverage of the RBC Heritage golf event. Nantz and Gary McCord presented highlights of his life and career – both as a player and at CBS – ending with his 1994 Masters sign-off. During a Fox NASCAR broadcast, Chris Myers paid tribute to Summerall on behalf of Fox.

Summerall was interred at the Dallas–Fort Worth National Cemetery.

== See also ==
- History of the New York Giants (1925–1978)

== Bibliography ==
- When Pride Still Mattered, A Life of Vince Lombardi, by David Maraniss, 1999, (ISBN 0-684-84418-4)

=== Books by Summerall ===
- Summerall, Pat and Chanin, John (1968), Kicking To Win, New York: Viking Press, (ISBN 978-0-670-41290-7)
- Summerall, Pat, Moskovitz, Jim, and Kubey, Craig (1996), Pat Summerall's Sports in America: 32 Celebrated Sports Personalities Talk About Their Most Memorable Moments in and Out of the Sports Arena, New York: Harpercollins, (ISBN 978-0-062-70186-2)
- Summerall, Pat, Rhame, Will D., and McNulty, James A. (1999), Business Golf: The Art of Building Relationships Through Golf, Secaucus, New Jersey: Carol Publishing Group, (ISBN 978-1-559-72494-4)
- Summerall, Pat. (2006), Summerall: On And Off The Air, Nashville, Tennessee: Thomas Nelson Inc., (ISBN 978-0-785-21492-2)
- Summerall, Pat and Levin, Michael (2010), Giants: What I learned about life from Vince Lombardi and Tom Landry, Hoboken, New Jersey: John Wiley and Sons, Inc., (ISBN 978-0-470-90908-9)

Preceded by first lead analyst	Lead game analyst, NFL on CBS; 1968	Succeeded by Paul Christman
Preceded by Paul Christman	Lead game analyst, NFL on CBS; 1970–1973	Succeeded by Tom Brookshier
Preceded by Ray Scott	Lead play-by-play announcer, The NFL on CBS; 1974–1993	Succeeded by Greg Gumbel
Preceded by Keith Jackson	Play-by-play announcer, NBA Finals; 1974	Succeeded by Brent Musburger
Preceded by None	Lead play-by-play announcer, NFL on Fox; 1994–2001	Succeeded by Joe Buck
Preceded by Ray Scott	Super Bowl television play-by-play announcer (NFC package carrier); 1975–2001	Succeeded by Joe Buck
