= WWE Unreal =

American reality television series (2025–present)

- Genre: Reality television Documentary series
- Created by: Paul "Triple H" Levesque
- Directed by: Chris Weaver, Terrell Riley, Steve Trout
- Composer: David Robidoux
- Country of origin: United States
- Original language: English
- No. of seasons: 3
- No. of episodes: 15

Production
- Executive producers: Keith Cossrow; Jamie Horowitz; Ross Ketover; Peyton Manning; Ken Rodgers; Jessica Boddy; Lee Fitting; Ben Houser; Marc Pomarico
- Producer: Erik Powers
- Running time: 51-64 mins.
- Production companies: Omaha Productions; NFL Films; Skydance Sports

Original release
- Network: Netflix
- Release: July 29, 2025 – present

WWE Unreal is an American professional wrestling reality television series produced by Skydance Sports, NFL Films and Omaha Productions. It premiered on the Netflix streaming service worldwide on July 29, 2025 with a full season of 5 episodes.

== Plot ==
The series involves various WWE personalities, and goes behind the scenes as the staff and superstars plan and create storylines and matches. Notable appearances include CM Punk, John Cena, Roman Reigns, Cody Rhodes, Charlotte Flair and The Rock.

== Series overview ==
Season	Episodes	Originally released
1	5	July 29, 2025
2	5	January 20, 2026
3	5	July 21, 2026

== Episodes ==
=== Season 1 (2025) ===
No.	Title	Original release date
1	"New Era"	July 29, 2025
The episode shows the leadup to the WWE Raw premiere on Netflix.
2	"Push"	July 29, 2025
Behind the scenes in the writer's room as the creative team books the Royal Rumble.
3	"Worth the Wait"	July 29, 2025
Behind the scenes showing Bianca Belair, Chelsea Green, Charlotte Flair as they deal with injuries and returns during the leadup to WrestleMania.
4	"Heel Turn"	July 29, 2025
A behind the scenes look at John Cena showing his true colors at Elimination Chamber.
5	"WrestleMania"	July 29, 2025
Behind the scenes with the staff and superstars participating in WrestleMania 41.

=== Season 2 (2026) ===
No.	Title	Original release date
1	"No Days Off"	January 20, 2026
The episode follows Becky Lynch as she returns to WWE after time off, and Pat McAfee joining WWE and becoming a prominent figure.
2	"The Truth"	January 20, 2026
Behind the scenes as WWE staple R-Truth faces challenges as his contract expires and Naomi returns to WWE.
3	"The Vision"	January 20, 2026
The episode follows the road to SummerSlam with Penta, Chelsea Green, & other WWE Superstars and Executives.
4	"Performance Art"	January 20, 2026
Behind the scenes of SummerSlam, while Rhea Ripley and Iyo Sky have a match at Evolution.
5	"The Pop"	January 20, 2026
Behind the scenes as Seth Rollins returns, the rivalry between Becky Lynch and Lyra Valkyria continues, and John Cena's retirement tour drives through SummerSlam.

=== Season 3 (2026) ===
No.	Title	Original release date
1	"The Why"	July 21, 2026
This episode revolves around John Cena's farewell run and the return of AJ Lee to assist her husband CM Punk in his feud with Seth Rollins and Becky Lynch, as well as the push of new superstars like Bron Breakker when Rollins gets injured.
2	"The Last Time is Now"	July 21, 2026
On the second half of Cena's retirement tour, matches against Brock Lesnar, AJ Styles, Dominik Mysterio, and his final match against Gunther are highlighted, including both the positive and negative fan reactions to each bout.
3	"Rise & Rumble"	July 21, 2026
Leading up to and during the Royal Rumble, Chelsea Green, Lash Legend, and eventual winner Liv Morgan discuss their chances leading up to the event.
4	"Life Happens"	July 21, 2026
The Vision stable appears snakebit with injuries to Breakker and Bronson Reed, CM Punk and AJ Lee detail the loss of their dog Larry while competing for titles at Elimination Chamber, and the victories of Rhea Ripley and Randy Orton at said event are detailed.
5	"The Grandest Stage"	July 21, 2026
WrestleMania 42 showcases Night 1 events such as AJ Lee vs. Becky Lynch for the Women's IC title, Bron Breakker's return during Seth Rollins' match with Gunther, Liv Morgan winning the Women's World Championship from Stephanie Vaquer, who subsequently takes an extended break, and the controversial injection of Pat McAfee in Cody Rhodes' WWE Undisputed Championship match with Randy Orton. Night 2 highlights Oba Femi's slaying of Brock Lesnar, Trick Williams defeating Sami Zayn for the U.S. title, and the instant classic World Heavyweight Championship match between CM Punk and Roman Reigns.

== Production ==
The series was commissioned by WWE's global international streaming service partner Netflix during WWE's flagship WrestleMania event with Skydance Media's sport division Skydance Sports, Omaha Productions and NFL Films co-producing.

== See also ==
- WWE Confidential
- AEW All Access
