= AEW All Access =

2023 American television series

- Genre: Reality television
- Country of origin: United States
- Original language: English
- No. of seasons: 1
- No. of episodes: 6 (list of episodes)

Original release
- Network: TBS (until May 31, 2023); Max (from June 9, 2023)
- Release: March 29 – May 10, 2023

AEW All Access is a 2023 American reality television series. The series premiered on March 29, 2023.

This program initially aired on TBS in the United States, but upon AEW's announcement of expanding its relationship with Warner Bros. Discovery, All Access moved to the HBO Max streaming service (formerly Max) beginning on June 9, 2023.

== Plot ==
The series offers an all-access look into the backstage world of All Elite Wrestling.

== Series overview ==
Season	Episodes	Originally released	
Season	Episodes	First released	Last released
1	6	March 29, 2023	May 10, 2023

== Episode list ==
=== Season 1 (2023) ===
No.	Title	Original release date	Viewers (millions)	Rating
1	"Life on the Ropes"	March 29, 2023	0.32	TBA
2	"Main Event"	April 5, 2023	0.33	TBA
3	"Full Gear"	April 12, 2023	0.28	TBA
4	"Wayward Sons"	April 26, 2023	0.29	TBA
5	"Winter is Coming"	May 3, 2023	0.30	TBA
6	"All About the Boom"	May 10, 2023	0.33	TBA

== See also ==
- WWE Confidential
- WWE Unreal
