= Sports Stars of Tomorrow =

- Also known as: Future Phenoms (2005–19)
- Genre: High school sports
- Presented by: Bill Jones (2005–2006); Pat Summerall (2006–2012); Charles Davis (2012–)
- Country of origin: United States
- No. of seasons: 15
- No. of episodes: 420

Production
- Executive producer: James Harris
- Producer: Joe McCann
- Production locations: Fort Worth, Texas and on location
- Camera setup: Jerome Butler; Matt Bragg; Ward Fasold; Robert Shiekh; Ashlea Bullington
- Running time: 30 minutes
- Production companies: Gameday Productions (producer); TVS (distributor)

Original release
- Network: Syndication
- Release: September 17, 2005 – present

Sports Stars of Tomorrow (formerly known until September 2019 as Future Phenoms) is a United States nationally syndicated sports television show about high school athletics and participants. The show began in 2005, when it was hosted by Bill Jones, and it is currently hosted by NFL on CBS color commentator and former player Charles Davis. The series features top prep prospects across the country being recruited by colleges (or professional teams, depending on their chosen sports' rules regarding their drafts for high school students), highlighting their stories on and off the field.

The series is produced by Fort Worth-based Gameday Productions, and is designed to also comply with American educational children's programming guidelines, though it airs on a number of cable networks without those restrictions (mainly regional sports networks, including the FanDuel Sports Networks), along with some digital subchannel networks to meet their own E/I burdens.

As the series has been in production since 2005, a number of current and past professional athletes have appeared on the series.

NFL Players: Andrew Luck, Joey Bosa, Nick Bosa, Anthony Barr, Jared Goff, Deshaun Watson, Jadeveon Clowney, Kyler Murray
NBA Players: John Wall, Karl-Anthony Towns, Zion Williamson, Kevin Love, Kyrie Irving, Kevin Durant
Athletes in other sports: Missy Franklin, Brittney Griner, Mallory Pugh, Jack Flaherty, Kaleena Mosqueda-Lewis, Tatyana McFadden

== Awards ==
- The Telly Awards - 2017 - Bronze - TV Shows/Segments
- Aurora Awards - 2017 - Gold - Sports Related
- Aurora Awards - 2017 - Gold - Broadcast: Feature Story - Ian Green

== Website ==
- Official website
