= Vince Lombardi Trophy =

Trophy for the winning team of the Super Bowl

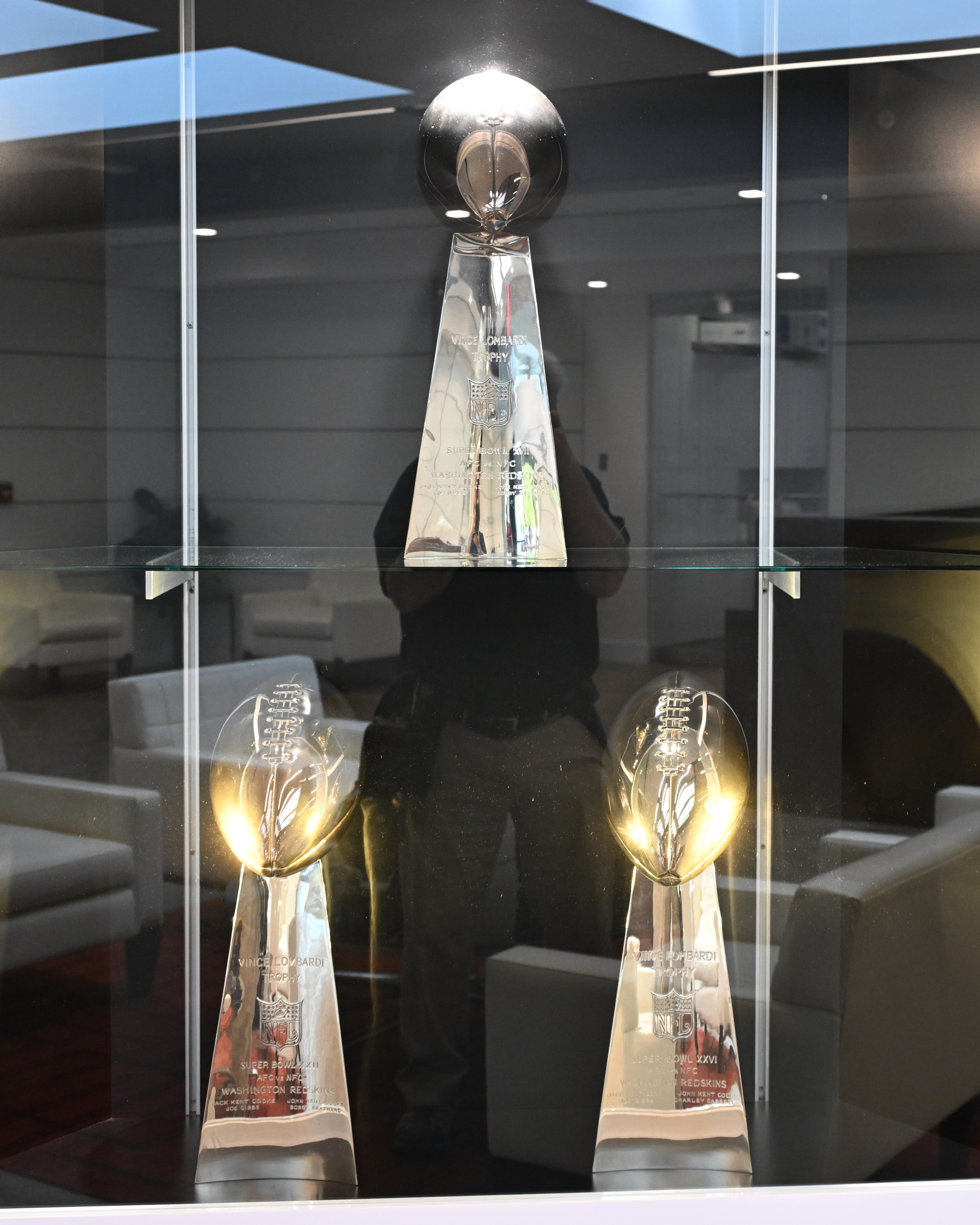
- The Washington Commanders' three Vince Lombardi Trophies
- Sport: American football
- Competition: NFL playoffs
- Awarded for: Winning the Super Bowl
- Country: United States
- Presented by: National Football League

History
- First award: 1967
- Editions: 60
- First winner: Green Bay Packers
- Most wins: Pittsburgh Steelers, New England Patriots (6, tied) (AFC); San Francisco 49ers, Dallas Cowboys (5, tied) (NFC)
- Most recent: Seattle Seahawks (2)
- Website: superbowl.com

The Vince Lombardi Trophy, also known simply as the Lombardi Trophy or just the Lombardi, is the trophy awarded each year to the winning team of the National Football League's (NFL) championship game, the Super Bowl. The trophy is named in honor of NFL coach Vince Lombardi, who led the Green Bay Packers to victories in the first two Super Bowl games.

During lunch with NFL commissioner Pete Rozelle in 1966, Tiffany & Co. vice president Oscar Riedner made a sketch on a cocktail napkin of what would become the Vince Lombardi Trophy: a football in a kicking position on a three concave sided stand. The original trophy was produced by Tiffany & Co. in Newark, New Jersey. Others have since been handcrafted by the company in Parsippany, New Jersey. As of 2017, the trophy is produced at the Tiffany & Co. Forest Hill manufacturing facility in Cumberland, Rhode Island.

The first trophy, inscribed with the words "World Professional Football Championship," was awarded to the Green Bay Packers on January 15, 1967, after they defeated the Kansas City Chiefs in Super Bowl I. Following the death of Vince Lombardi in September 1970, the trophy was officially renamed in his memory. It was presented for the first time as the Vince Lombardi Trophy to the Baltimore Colts after their victory over the Dallas Cowboys in Super Bowl V.

Originally, the trophy was presented inside the winning team's locker room. Since Super Bowl XXX in January 1996, it has been presented to the owner of the winning team on the field. Packers team president and CEO Bob Harlan and Mark Murphy accepted the trophy on behalf of the Green Bay community after Super Bowl XXXI and Super Bowl XLV, respectively.

Unlike trophies such as the Stanley Cup and the Grey Cup, a new Vince Lombardi Trophy is cast every year, and the winning team maintains permanent possession of it. The one exception is the trophy won by the then-Baltimore Colts in Super Bowl V. The city of Baltimore retained possession of the trophy (albeit a replica as previous owner Carroll Rosenbloom took the original trophy with him when he sold the team) as part of the legal settlement after the Colts made their infamous "Midnight Mayflower" relocation to Indianapolis, Indiana, on March 29, 1984. Both the relocated Colts and their successors, the Ravens, have since earned trophies in their own right.

Since Super Bowl XLV, the Vince Lombardi Trophy has been prominently featured in the Super Bowl logo design.

== Appearance ==
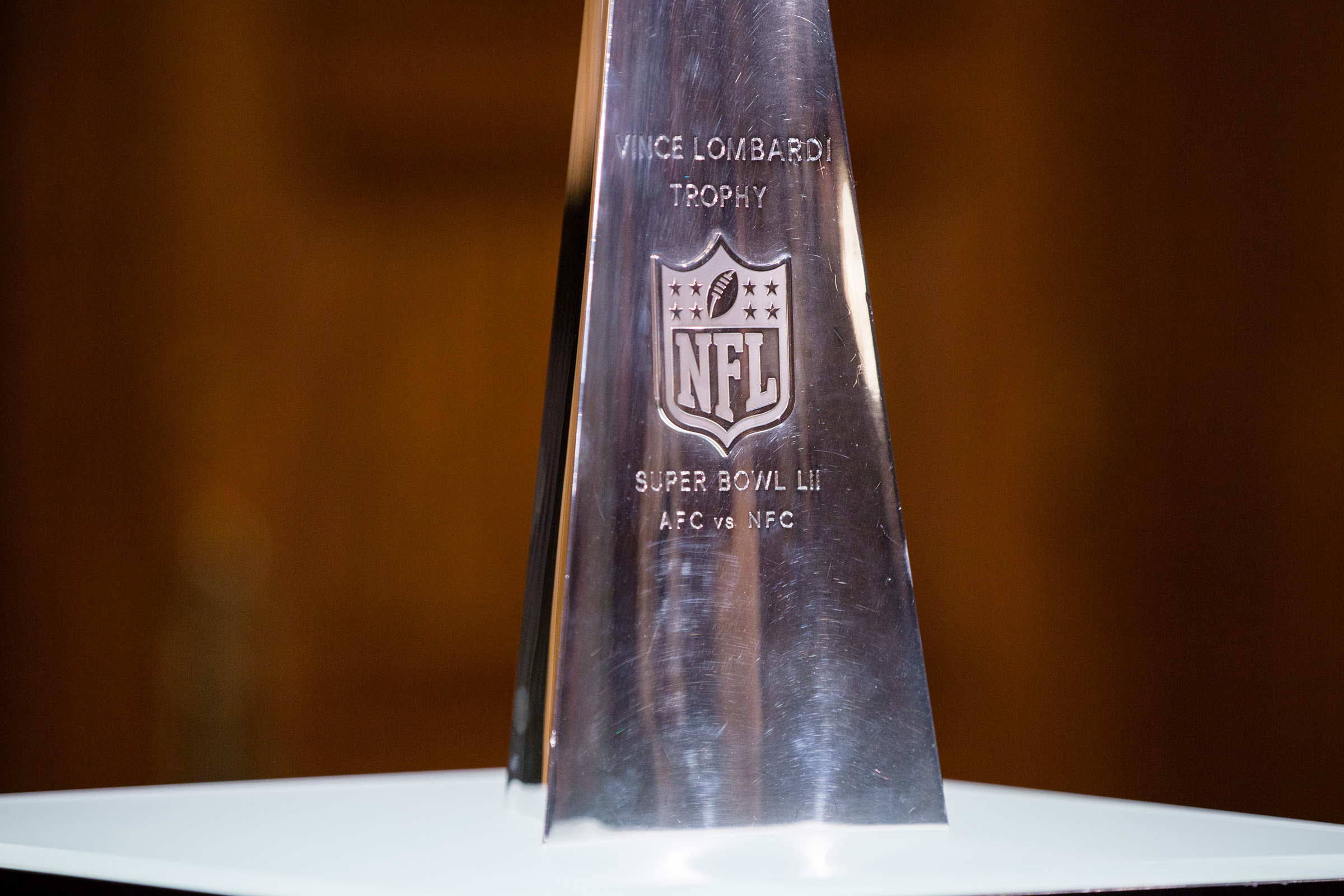
Closeup of engraving on trophy (trophy in this particular photo was awarded for Super Bowl LII).

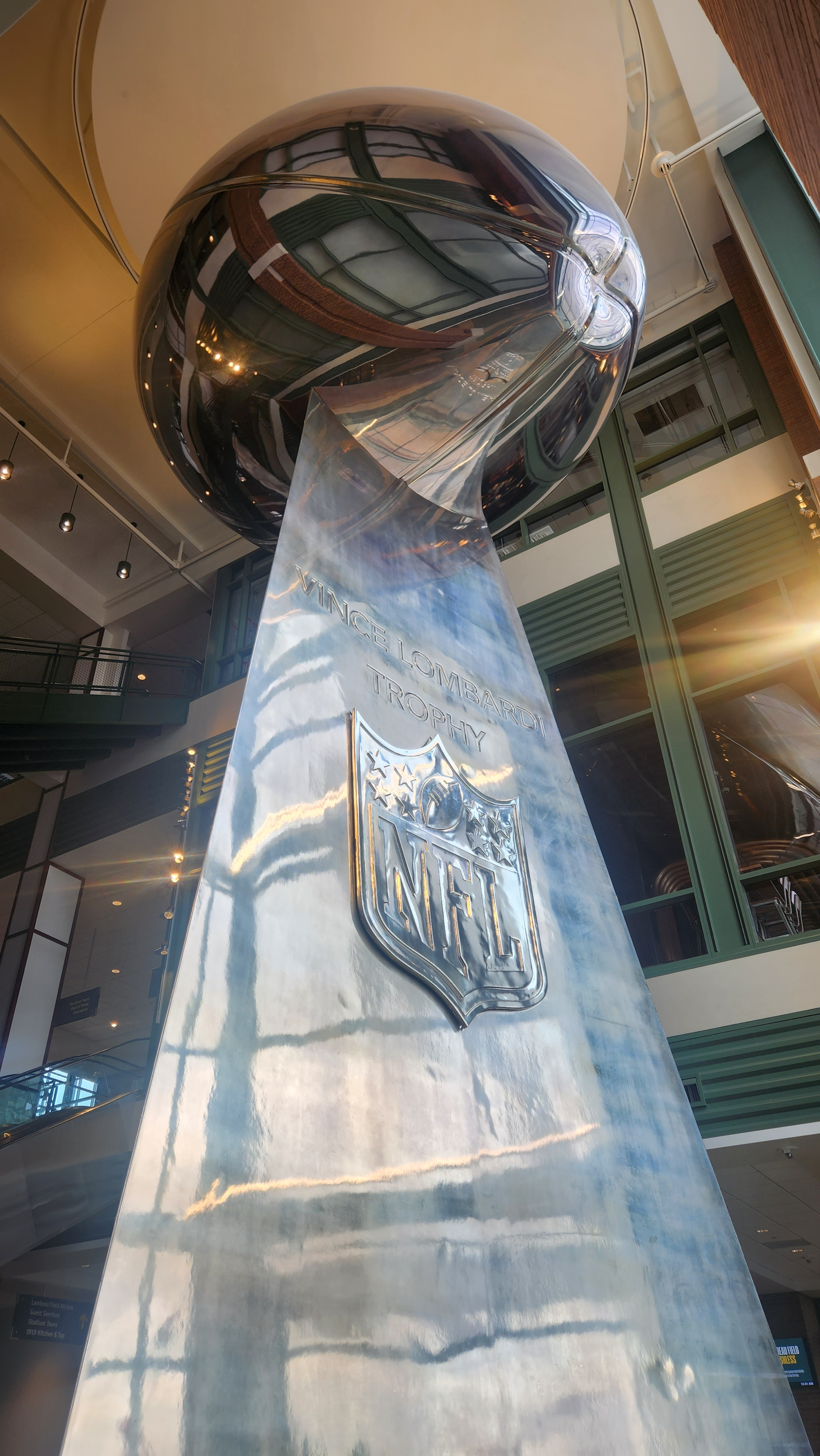
Closeup of the trophy on display at Lambeau Field

The Vince Lombardi Trophy stands 22 inches (56 cm) tall, weighs 107.3 ounces or approximately 7 pounds (3.2 kg) and depicts a football in a kicking position on a three concave sided stand, and is entirely made of sterling silver.

The words "Vince Lombardi Trophy" along with the Roman numerals of that year's Super Bowl are engraved on and the NFL shield is affixed onto the base. After the trophy is awarded, it is sent back to Tiffany's to be engraved with the names of the participating teams, the date, location, and the game's final score. It is then sent back to the winning team for them to keep. Smaller replicas are made for each person on the winning team.

For the first four championship games, both the NFL and the AFL logos were in the center of the trophy. Starting from Super Bowl V, only the NFL shield was on the front. Beginning with Super Bowl XXXVIII, the shield took on a frosted appearance. Starting with Super Bowl XLIII, the slightly redesigned NFL shield began appearing on the trophy, still with a frosted appearance. Other than the logo, the trophy has had no significant changes made since the first Super Bowl. While no franchise possesses all four versions, the Green Bay Packers, New England Patriots, New York Giants, and Pittsburgh Steelers have three of the four designs.

=== Rob Gronkowski denting incident ===
New England Patriots tight end Rob Gronkowski using the trophy as a bat (left), and the baseball-sized dent he left on it in April 2019

On April 9, 2019, Rob Gronkowski (who had retired from the New England Patriots two weeks before) used the Super Bowl LIII Vince Lombardi trophy as a bat to bunt a practice pitch from wide receiver Julian Edelman during the Boston Red Sox season opener where he was to throw the ceremonial first pitch with his former teammates. It left a baseball-sized dent in the trophy, his third overall, and his former team's sixth. The humorous documentary-style video released by the Patriots about the incident became popular, with special teamer Matthew Slater, who witnessed the incident first hand, saying that if anyone can get away with it, it would be the "MVP (Edelman) and the future Hall of Famer (Gronkowski)."

Patriots vice president of media relations Stacey James stated that, "Maybe they’ll fix it down the road. That’s something they can always fix in the future, but at least for now, we’re going to keep the dent and tell the story."

== Teams with most Vince Lombardi Trophies ==
The Super Bowl is currently played in early February (the game originally took place in early to mid-January), culminating a regular season that generally begins in September of the previous calendar year. For example, Super Bowl 50, which was played on February 7, 2016, determined the league champion for the 2015 NFL season. The years shown below refer to the season, not the date that the Super Bowl was actually played:

- Six
  - Pittsburgh Steelers — 1974, 1975, 1978, 1979, 2005, 2008
  - New England Patriots — 2001, 2003, 2004, 2014, 2016, 2018
- Five
  - Dallas Cowboys — 1971, 1977, 1992, 1993, 1995
  - San Francisco 49ers — 1981, 1984, 1988, 1989, 1994
- Four
  - Green Bay Packers — 1966, 1967, 1996, 2010
  - New York Giants — 1986, 1990, 2007, 2011
  - Kansas City Chiefs — 1969, 2019, 2022, 2023
- Three
  - Las Vegas Raiders — 1976, 1980 (as Oakland Raiders), 1983 (as Los Angeles Raiders)
  - Washington Commanders — 1982, 1987, 1991 (as Washington Redskins)
  - Denver Broncos — 1997, 1998, 2015

Although none of these teams have ever won three straight Super Bowls, two teams have won three Lombardi trophies in four years and one team twice won the trophy two out of three consecutive years: The Dallas Cowboys (1992, 1993, 1995) and the New England Patriots (2001, 2003, 2004) and (2014, 2016) and (2016, 2018). The Pittsburgh Steelers won four Super Bowls in six years (1974, 1975, 1978, 1979). The Green Bay Packers won three NFL Championships in a row at the advent of the Super Bowl era: 1965, 1966 and 1967.

As an individual player, Tom Brady, a former quarterback with the New England Patriots and Tampa Bay Buccaneers, won seven Super Bowls in his career, more than any single NFL franchise.

As an individual coach, Bill Belichick, a defensive coordinator with the New York Giants and Head coach with New England Patriots, has won eight Super Bowls in his career, more than any single NFL franchise or player.

== Presentation ceremony ==
The trophy has been presented on a stage constructed on the field since Super Bowl XXX in 1996. A personality from the network broadcasting the game handles the presentation ceremony. Terry Bradshaw has hosted every presentation for Fox since Super Bowl XXXI, with the exception of Super Bowl XLVIII, when Michael Strahan substituted for him. Jim Nantz has handled the duties for CBS since Super Bowl XXXV. Dan Patrick hosted the ceremony for NBC from Super Bowl XLIII to Super Bowl LII. Mike Tirico hosted the ceremony for NBC for Super Bowl LVI.

The winning owner, winning coach, winning quarterback, and (if not a quarterback) the game MVP are usually recognized. "The Lombardi Trophy Theme," composed by David Robidoux in 2005, plays during the trophy handoff.

From Super Bowl I to Super Bowl XXIX, the trophy was held by the commissioner to begin the ceremony and the commissioner then handed the trophy directly to the team owner in the winning locker room. The lone exception to this was in Super Bowl V where the trophy presentation ceremony wasn't done by the commissioner but instead by Vince Lombardi's widow, Marie.

From Super Bowl XXX to Super Bowl XXXIX, then from Super Bowl LIV to Super Bowl LVII, and again in Super Bowl LIX, the trophy was set on the stage to begin the ceremony and the commissioner handed the trophy directly to the team owner on the field.

From Super Bowl XL to Super Bowl LIII, and also in Super Bowl LVIII, a former NFL player, usually a past Super Bowl MVP or notable figure of the host city's franchise, brought the Lombardi Trophy to the center of the stadium, as he walked past members of the winning team. Players who have partaken in Lombardi Trophy presentation ceremonies are listed below:

- Super Bowl XL Presentation – Bart Starr (MVP, Super Bowl I and Super Bowl II)
- Super Bowl XLI Presentation – Don Shula (former Miami Dolphins head coach)
- Super Bowl XLII Presentation – Doug Williams (MVP, Super Bowl XXII)
- Super Bowl XLIII Presentation – Joe Namath (MVP, Super Bowl III)
- Super Bowl XLIV Presentation – Len Dawson (MVP, Super Bowl IV)
- Super Bowl XLV Presentation – Roger Staubach (former Dallas Cowboys quarterback and MVP, Super Bowl VI)
- Super Bowl XLVI Presentation – Raymond Berry (former Baltimore Colts split end; coached New England Patriots in Super Bowl XX)
- Super Bowl XLVII Presentation – Richard Dent (MVP, Super Bowl XX, played in New Orleans)
- Super Bowl XLVIII Presentation – Marcus Allen (MVP, Super Bowl XVIII)
- Super Bowl XLIX Presentation – Kurt Warner (former Arizona Cardinals quarterback and MVP, Super Bowl XXXIV)
- Super Bowl 50 Presentation – Terrell Davis (MVP, Super Bowl XXXII), who handed it to Namath, who handed it to Lynn Swann (MVP, Super Bowl X)
- Super Bowl LI Presentation – Willie McGinest (former New England Patriots linebacker), who handed it to Michael Strahan (former New York Giants defensive end).
- Super Bowl LII Presentation – Darrell Green (former Washington Redskins cornerback, Super Bowl XVIII, Super Bowl XXII, Super Bowl XXVI (played in Minneapolis))
- Super Bowl LIII Presentation – Vince Wilfork (former New England Patriots nose tackle), who handed it to Emmitt Smith (MVP, Super Bowl XXVIII (played in Atlanta)), who handed it to Joe Namath.
- Super Bowl LVIII Presentation - Larry Csonka (MVP, Super Bowl VIII), who handed it to John Elway (MVP, Super Bowl XXXIII).

== Gallery ==
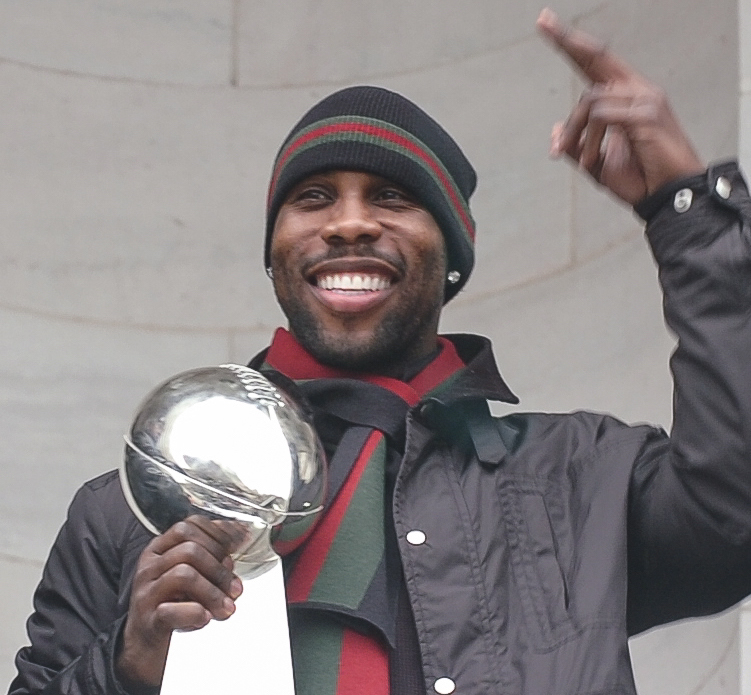
Trophy awarded for Super Bowl XLVII photographed on February 5, 2013. Trophy held by Anquan Boldin

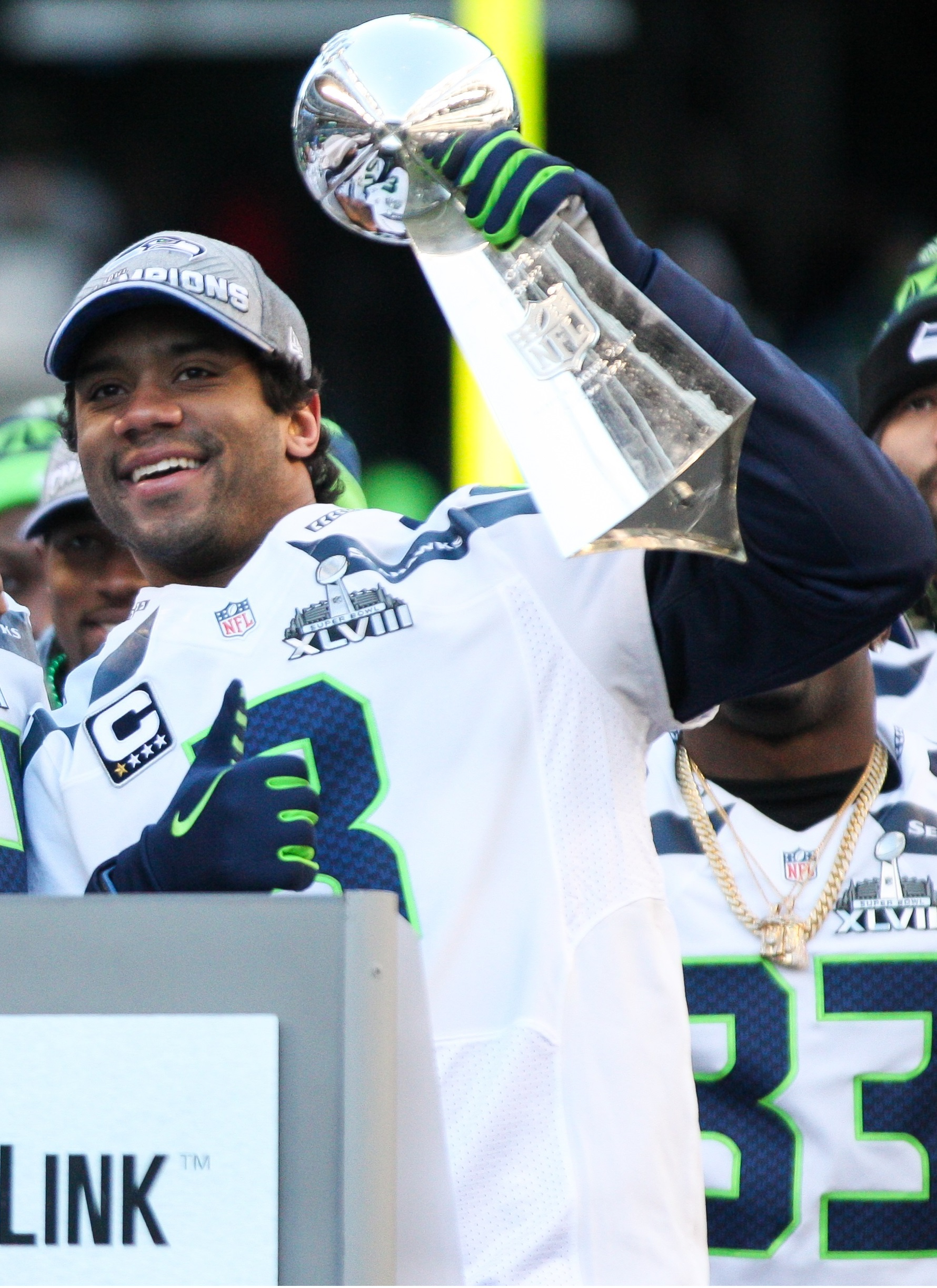
Trophy awarded for Super Bowl XLVIII on February 5, 2014. Trophy held by Russell Wilson

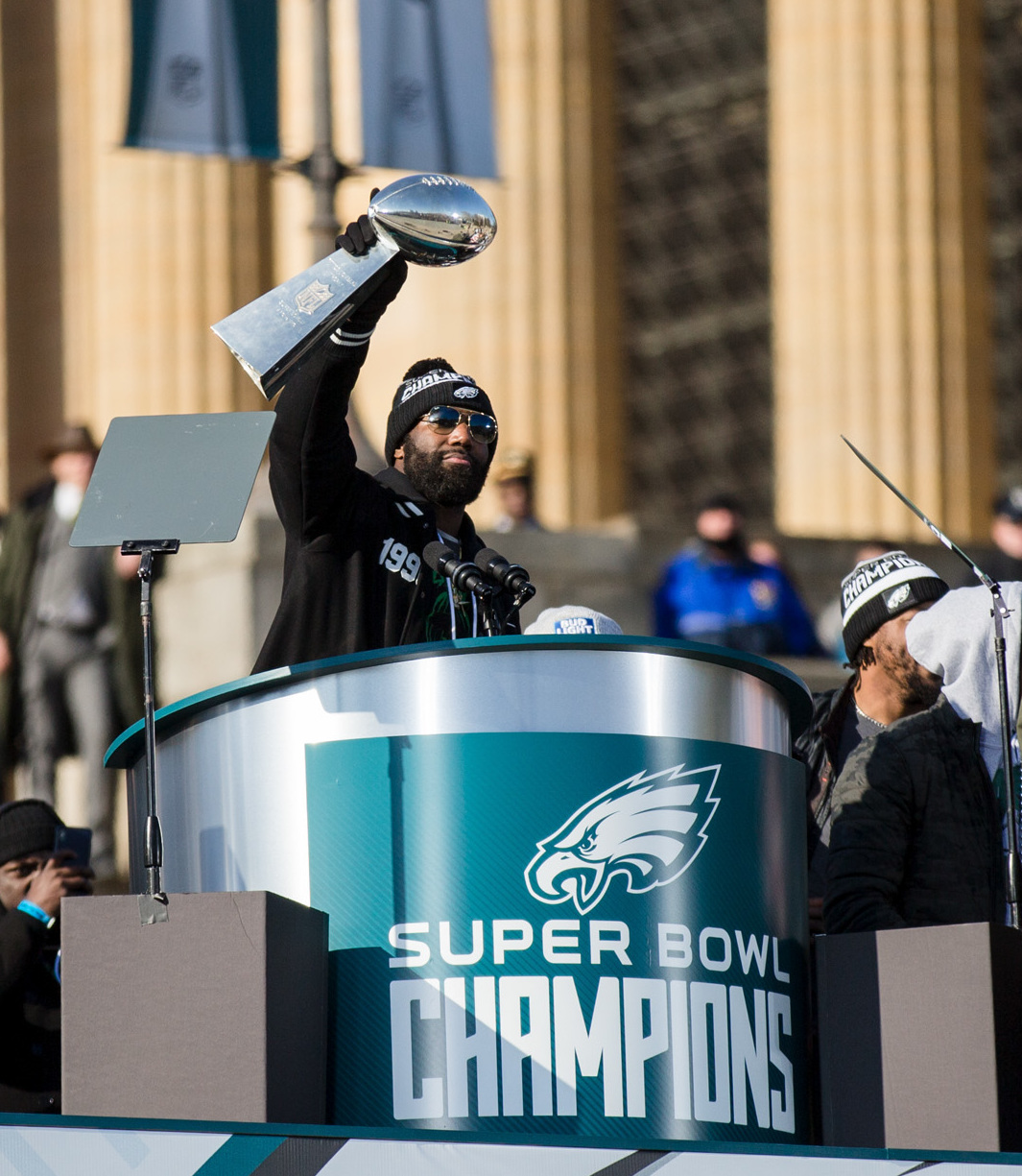
Trophy awarded for Super Bowl LII photographed on February 8, 2018. Trophy held by Malcolm Jenkins

== See also ==
- Ed Thorp Memorial Trophy – NFL Championship trophy (1934–1967)
- List of National Football League awards
