= Tom Hedden =

American score composer

- Genre: Orchestral
- Occupation: Music composer
- Years active: 1990–present
- Label: NFL Films
- Website: tomheddenmusic.com

Tom Hedden is an American score composer, the former music director at NFL Films, and National Football League Director of Music Administration. In 2009, Hedden left the NFL and has since composed music independently for, among others, NASCAR Media Group, Golf Channel, World Poker Tour, Hock Films, ESPN and The SEC Network.

== Career ==
Hedden graduated from the Berklee College of Music, and became the music director of NFL Films in 1990. Hedden was instructed by NFL Films President Steve Sabol in 1994 to create a score for a TNT special titled, 75 Seasons: The History of the NFL. After nine months, Hedden was awarded the Emmy Award for Musical Score; working with David Robidoux, Hedden would eventually win four more Emmys for the specials Favre 4Ever, Emmitt Smith: Run With History, NFL Century – In Their Words, and Unitas. Together, Hedden and Robidoux would also create the score for History Channel's Blood in a Stone. In 1997, Hedden performed the Super Bowl theme he composed with the Louisiana Philharmonic Orchestra at Super Bowl XXXI. One of the pieces he composed, A New Game, featured an unusual 15/8 time signature; the piece would eventually be played at National Football League games whenever the visiting team calls a timeout. Another composition of his, Sprint Right, is played in NFL broadcasts. Hedden also had his music featured in films such as The Waterboy and Little Children. In 2008, he became the NFL's Director of Music Administration, and is in charge of music rights for NFL Network, NFL.com and other branches operated by the league. In 2009, Hedden left his position at NFL Films to form Tom Hedden Music, a musical production and consulting company, though he still works with the company. In 2012, Hedden composed music used at Watkins Glen International.

He was named SESAC's Television Composer of the Year twice, and has received accolades from the International Television Association and Philadelphia Advertising Club. Hedden was part of the team at John Hill Music who were awarded a Clio Award in 1988 for Best Automotive Campaign for a Subaru commercial. Hedden's work is featured in both the Pro Football Hall of Fame and NASCAR Hall of Fame. His work is also featured in the Madden NFL video game series.
