= NFL Films =

Motion picture company owned by the National Football League

Coordinates: 39.9591°N 74.8977°W

NFL Productions, LLC
- Trade name: NFL Films
- Formerly: Blair Motion Pictures (1962–1965)
- Type: Subsidiary
- Industry: Entertainment
- Founded: 1962; 64 years ago
- Founder: Ed Sabol
- Headquarters: Mount Laurel, New Jersey, United States
- Services: Film production; Television production
- Parent: National Football League
- Website: nflfilms.nfl.com

NFL Productions, LLC, doing business as NFL Films, is the film and television production company of the National Football League. It produces commercials, television programs, feature films, and documentaries for and about the NFL, as well as other unrelated major events and awards shows. Founded as Blair Motion Pictures by Ed Sabol in 1962 and run by his son Steve Sabol until his death, it produces most of the NFL's filmed and videotaped content except its live game coverage, which is handled separately by the individual networks. NFL Films is based in Mount Laurel, New Jersey.

== Founding ==
Former NFL Films logo

Founder Ed Sabol was a World War II veteran who worked selling topcoats after returning to the United States. In his spare time, he used a motion picture camera, received as a wedding gift, to record his son Steve's high school football games. Inspired by his work, Sabol founded a small film company called Blair Motion Pictures, named after his daughter Blair.

Sabol won the bidding for the rights to film the 1962 NFL championship game for $5,000, double the bid for the 1961 championship game. The film of that game impressed NFL Commissioner Pete Rozelle, who asked the owners of the NFL to agree to buy out Sabol's company. Although the owners rejected Rozelle's proposal in 1964, they agreed a year later and renamed Sabol's company NFL Films. He received $20,000 in seed money from each of the league's then 14 owners, and in return would shoot all NFL games and produce an annual highlight film for each team.

In June 1966, the NFL agreed with the rival American Football League to merge in 1970. One of the reasons the leagues initially remained separate entities was to give Sabol adequate time to expand NFL Films in order to service a significantly enlarged league. Under the merger terms, NFL Films began covering the American Football League (AFL) in 1968, ostensibly under a newly established "AFL Films" division. In reality, "AFL Films" crews were simply regular NFL Films personnel wearing separate jackets to appease AFL loyalists.

On August 6, 2011, Ed Sabol was inducted into the Pro Football Hall of Fame as a major contributor to the National Football League. Sabol died on February 9, 2015, at his home in Arizona.

== Style ==
Much has been made of the Films style. Salon.com television critic, Matt Zoller Seitz, has called NFL Films "the greatest in-house P.R. machine in pro sports history...an outfit that could make even a tedious stalemate seem as momentous as the battle for the Alamo."

NFL Films productions follow certain patterns. Film is mostly used. One camera is dedicated entirely to slow motion shots and microphones are present on the sidelines and near the field to pick up both the sounds of the game as well as the talk on the sidelines. The narrators have deep, powerful, baritone voices. Narrators have usually been from the Philadelphia metropolitan area, with well-known announcers such as John Facenda, Harry Kalas, Jefferson Kaye, Andy Musser, Jack Whitaker, William Woodson, and current announcer Scott Graham all having narrated NFL Films presentations. J.K. Simmons was tapped to narrate the company's one-hour recap of the 16–0 regular season of the 2007 New England Patriots, while actor Burt Lancaster was tabbed for narrations in 1969. Burl Ives was also called upon to narrate the 1971 Washington Redskins highlight film.

Team-specific films such as "year-in-review films" have occasionally been narrated by broadcasters or personalities involved with the team in question. Examples include the 1985, 2000, and 2001 Oakland Raiders season reviews being narrated by actor and former Raiders player Carl Weathers. Former Giant Frank Gifford periodically narrated New York Giants season reviews (notably the company's throwback-themed 2013 season recap) until he died in 2015, and ex-Giants teammate Pat Summerall narrated highlight films for many teams until he died in 2013.

New England Patriots play-by-play announcer Gil Santos narrated the year-in-review films of the 1974, 1976, and 1978 seasons, and New Orleans Saints films from their inception in 1967 through 1979 were narrated by Don Criqui, who called Saints games for the NFL on CBS in the team's early years, along with radio announcers Al Wester and Wayne Mack. Longtime KDKA radio & KDKA-TV personality Larry Richert often narrated films of the Pittsburgh Steelers prior to becoming the team's PA announcer at Acrisure Stadium and continues to do so today. (Richert is also the brother-in-law to Miami Dolphins legend Dan Marino.) Other programming such as "NFL Films Presents" and its Super Bowl Recap hosted by Carissa Thompson has been narrated by veteran actor and voice actor Leonard Dozier.

The style of film has been called tight on the spiral, a reference to the frequently-used slow-motion shot of the spinning football as it travels from the quarterback's hand to the receiver. This shot usually consists of showing the quarterback throwing the football, then the camera zooming in to focus on the spinning ball, as the ball starts to descend, the camera zooms out, showing the result of the ball landing into the receiver's hands. NFL Films also dubs sound bites of local radio broadcasts over key plays, because radio announcers are typically more enthusiastic about their home teams than are the network television broadcasters.

In addition, NFL Films often uses multiple camera angles (with an emphasis on close-up shots that often exaggerate the speed of the players in real-time). The company's films also employ muscular orchestral scores from a wide variety of musicians, notably Sam Spence, Johnny Pearson (whose "Heavy Action" became the theme for Monday Night Football) Frank Rothman, Ralph Dollimore, Udi Harpaz, Malcolm Lockyer, Jan Stoeckart (under his varied stage names such as Jack Trombey), Peter Reno, Paul Lewis, Prameela Tomashek, Dave Robidoux and Tom Hedden.

The company's use of KPM Musichouse (now KPM Music) tracks also notably included Syd Dale; tracks include "Maelstrom" for the company's 1968 Minnesota Vikings season highlight reel and also the psychedelic-flavored jazz track "Artful Dodger" on the film recap of Super Bowl V, specifically during the montage which shows Johnny Unitas's 75-yard touchdown pass to John Mackey which was tipped in flight by Eddie Hinton and Mel Renfro before landing in the hands of Mackey.

The company also makes prolific use of footage of players and coaches in the locker room after the game. With these techniques, NFL Films turns football games into events that mimic ballet, opera, and epic battles. Among the company's most famous creation is the poem and accompanying music cue "The Autumn Wind", which have become official themes for the Las Vegas Raiders.

== Filmography ==
One of NFL Films' most popular series is Hard Knocks. With production run entirely from the field and the NFL Films facility, NFL Films and HBO follow one NFL team as they go through training camp, leading up to the beginning of the season.

NFL Films also produces the Greatest Moments series, which details classic games from the 1960s, 1970s, 1980s, 1990s, and 2000s (decade); the Lost Treasures series, which uses old NFL Films footage, which had previously never been shown on television, to look at football players, coaches, and referees; and NFL Films Presents, an umbrella title for other NFL Films productions that do not neatly fit an existing series (Katie Nolan serves as the current host of NFL Films Presents).

NFL Films also produces the NFL Game of the Week, which showcases a previous week's game. ION Television purchased the rights to air Game of the Week during the 2007 season.

Among other television programs, NFL Films is credited for producing NFL Total Access and much of the NFL Network's programming output. NFL Films also has a dedicated channel on free over-the-top service Pluto TV that launched in August 2019.

NFL Films' game highlights have been a staple of Inside the NFL for its entire run, starting at HBO in 1977 and going on to air on Showtime and Paramount+ through to its current home at The CW. NFL Films also produced for Showtime the five-part miniseries Full Color Football: The History of the American Football League, which aired in the fall of 2009 as part of the American Football League 50th anniversary celebration.

NFL Films produces an annual highlight film for each team every season, distributed by home video. If a team had a good year, the film often revels in each victory, while breezing through, or skipping altogether, losses during the season. Inversely, if a team suffered through a poor season, the highlights commonly still attempt to show the team in a good light, however difficult that may be. Losses and pitiful play is commonly, and conveniently, edited out, leaving only isolated moments of success. This prompts the viewer to not realize how bad the team might have been. Most films conclude by portraying teams optimistically for the upcoming season, whether founded or not.

The Sabols have used NFL Films to showcase their sense of humour. This is the case in the series titled, Football Follies. The Follies use blooper plays, such as fumbles, dropped passes, deflected or bobbled passes, players slipping and falling, mascots, the quarterback lining up behind the guard instead of the center, disorganization, outtakes and silly narration.

The presence of NFL Films' cameras allowed for the preservation of video footage from many of the NFL's 1960s-era games in an era when sports telecasts were either broadcast live without any recording or whose films and tapes were destroyed and recycled for later use. This practice did not fully stop until 1978.

Without the presence of NFL Films, there would be no surviving footage of the early Super Bowls. In comparison, other sports that lacked the film resources that the NFL had to have archives missing up through the 1970s, with much of the time before that preserved only by Canadian television broadcasters. For instance, in Major League Baseball, the broadcast of many World Series games before 1975 have been lost; nearly all broadcasts of League Championship Series from the first series in 1969 to 1978 are unavailable.

=== Television programs ===
Title	Years	Network	Co-production
Inside the NFL	1977–present	HBO/Showtime/Paramount+/The CW	
Hard Knocks	2001–present	HBO	HBO Sports
A Football Life	2011–present	NFL Network	
Quarterback	2023	Netflix	2PM Productions and Omaha Productions
NFL Draft: The Pick Is In	2023–present	The Roku Channel	Skydance Sports
Receiver	2024	Netflix	Omaha Productions
Evolution of the Black Quarterback	2024	Amazon Prime Video	Amazon MGM Studios, Smac Productions and Seven
They Call It Late Night with Jason Kelce	2025–present	ESPN	Skydance Sports and Wooderboy Productions
WWE Unreal	2025–present	Netflix	Skydance Sports, Omaha Productions and WWE
The Kingdom	2025–present	ESPN	Skydance Sports, Words + Pictures, 2PM Productions and Foolish Club Studios
America's Team: The Gambler and His Cowboys	2025	Netflix	Skydance Sports and Stardust Flames Productions
The Home Team: NY Jets	2025	Amazon Prime Video	Prime Video Sports, Skydance Sports, New York Jets, VaynerWATT
NFL Hometown Eats	2026–present	The Roku Channel	co-production with Skydance Sports, Hyphenate Media Group and Alfred Street Industries
The Land	TBA	Hulu	20th Television, Skydance Sports and Rhode Island Ave. Productions

=== Feature films ===
Title	Release date	Distributor	Co-production
Fantasy Football	November 25, 2022	Paramount+	Nickelodeon Movies, SpringHill Company and Genius Productions
The Perfect 10	February 11, 2023	Fox Sports Films	Fox Sports Films, Hall of Fame Village Media and H2H Productions
Holiday Touchdown: A Chiefs Love Story	November 30, 2024	Hallmark Channel	Skydance Sports and Hallmark Media

=== Current programming ===
- NFL Films Presents
- Inside the NFL
- NFL Turning Point
- NFL Gameday All-Access
- NFL Matchup
- Peyton's Places
- NFL Icons, released through Epix on October 2, 2021
- Good Morning Football

== Success ==
NFL Films generates an estimated annual revenue exceeding $50 million, a figure that's continuing to grow even though it's significantly lower than the NFL's television broadcast revenues, which totals several billion dollars annually. Rather than acting as a primary revenue driver, the value of NFL Films comes from its role in packaging, marketing, and promoting the league's games.

In addition to covering the National Football League, NFL Films has also ventured into other unrelated documentary films, such as documenting the Munich Olympics massacre for one of NBC's Olympics telecasts and serving as back-up film photography for other major events, including the Stanley Cup Final (NHL Original Productions), the NBA Finals (NBA Entertainment) and the World Series (MLB Productions). It also produced the video for Journey's 1983 hit single "Faithfully". NFL Films also has worked with Volkswagen Group in producing Audi's Truth in 24 series about Audi's efforts at the 24 Hours of Le Mans using the signature style to package and sell the marque's efforts in France. NFL Films has also produced television commercials for convenience store chain Sheetz.

The company has also done films for major college football programs, such as Colorado State University; the company's 1977 film on CSU's football program used John Denver's song "Rocky Mountain High" as well as an instrumental cover of The Beatles' song "Tell Me What You See", and noted alumni of the team who had gone on to NFL careers, such as Bill Larson of the Lions and Bill Kennedy of the Colts, Kevin McClain of the Rams, and Greg Stamrick of the Oilers.

NFL Films' distinctive style has been parodied in numerous commercials, particularly for the NFL's sponsors, including Sprint Nextel and Burger King.

NFL Films has won 112 Sports Emmys.

== Music rights controversy with Sam Spence ==
Sam Spence was long involved in a controversial situation with the NFL regarding the rights to perform or use his music in any media outlets. In an interview, Spence reported he was convinced to sign a contract that relinquished all of the rights to his music to NFL Films under the promise that the League would return the document to him. Spence alleged that NFL Films claimed that his music was "stolen" and signing the document would empower them to protect the music in court.

== Albums ==
- The Power and the Glory: The Original Music & Voices of NFL Films (1998)
- Autumn Thunder: 40 Years of NFL Films Music (2004)
- NFL Country (1996)
- Music from National Football League Films, LP NFL-1, c. 1970s.

== Films ==
- Truth in 24 (2008)
- Lombardi (2011)
- Fantasy Football (2022)
- The Perfect 10 (2023)
- Kelce (2023)

== NFL Films Lab ==
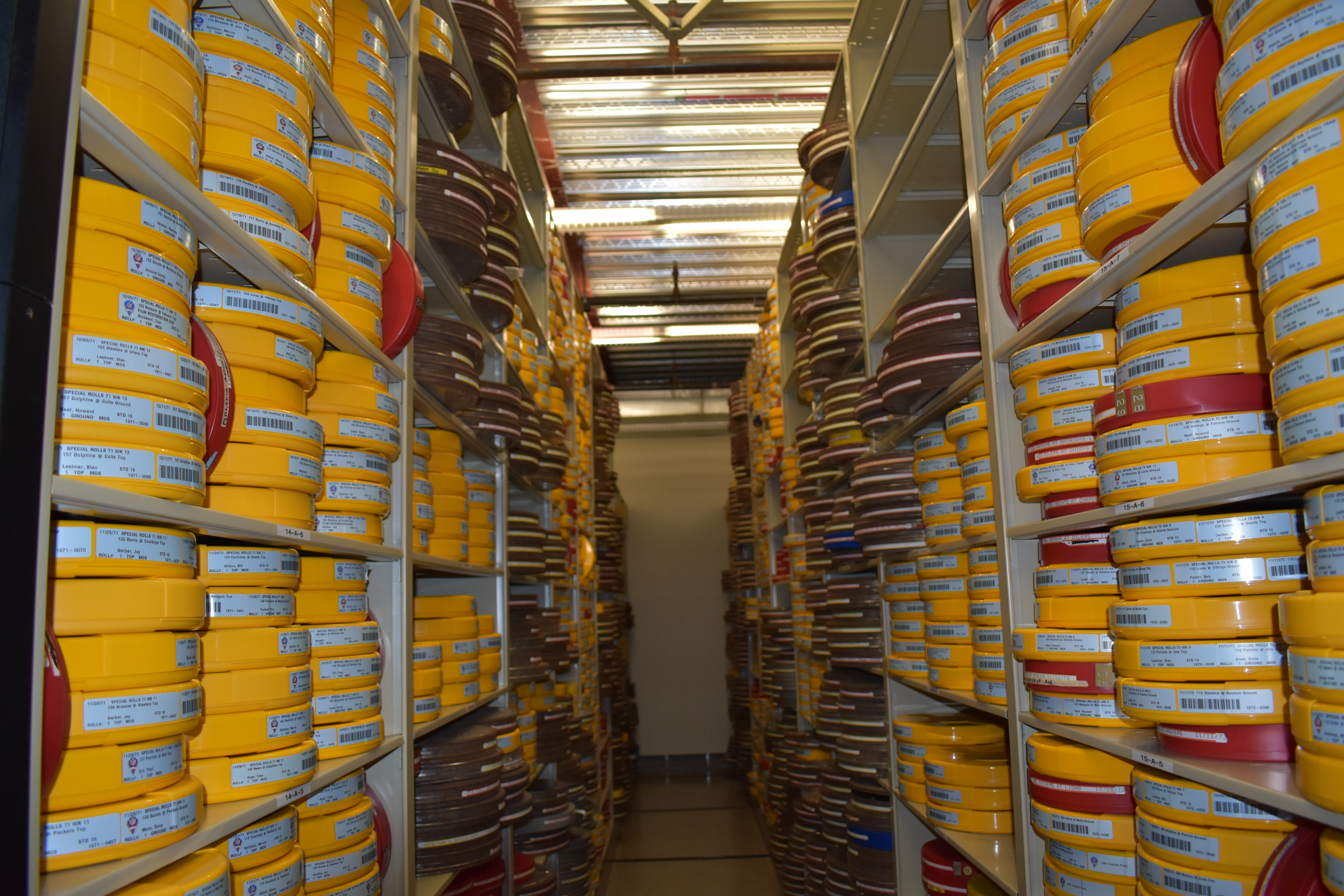
A section of the NFL Films climate-controlled film vault in Mt. Laurel, New Jersey. The vault houses all of the film in NFL Films' possession.

NFL Films operates its own in-house 16mm and 35mm Color Negative Processing Lab. This enables the film that is shot at each game to be rushed back to the Mt. Laurel facility and processed immediately so as to give the production team the maximum amount of time to produce its weekly shows.

The lab is open to the public for development needs. Clients include feature length and short films shot on location in Philadelphia as well as students at local universities.

The current lab is the third incarnation. The original lab was located in a building next to NFL Films original offices at 230 N 13th St in Philadelphia. The second lab was housed in the center of the NFL Films offices at 330 Fellowship Rd in Mt. Laurel, NJ. That entire one-story building has since been razed and replaced with a modern 4 story office building.

The third lab is located at the NFL Films current location in the Bishop's Gate industrial park in Mt. Laurel behind a two-story glass wall. This allows visitors to the offices to see the inner workings of the entire processing lab. Those on morning tours can often watch as employees develop film for use in weekly shows.

NFL Films Lab is also in charge of the archiving and maintenance of the vault. Containing over 100 continuous years of football footage, the vault houses all of the film that NFL Films has shot or acquired from other sources in its entire history. Currently, NFL Films is in the process of re-transferring all of its footage into high-definition format, although the original film will always be kept as it's likely to outlast tape medium in terms of degradation.

== See also ==
- Football Follies
- Sam Spence
