= The Mod Squad (disambiguation) =

The Mod Squad is an American crime drama TV series.

The Mod Squad may also refer to:

- The Mod Squad (film), a 1999 American mystery film
- The MOD Squad, professional wrestling tag team
- ModSquad, a global digital engagement services company

== See also ==
- Mob Squad (disambiguation)
