= 12s =

Fans of the Seattle Seahawks

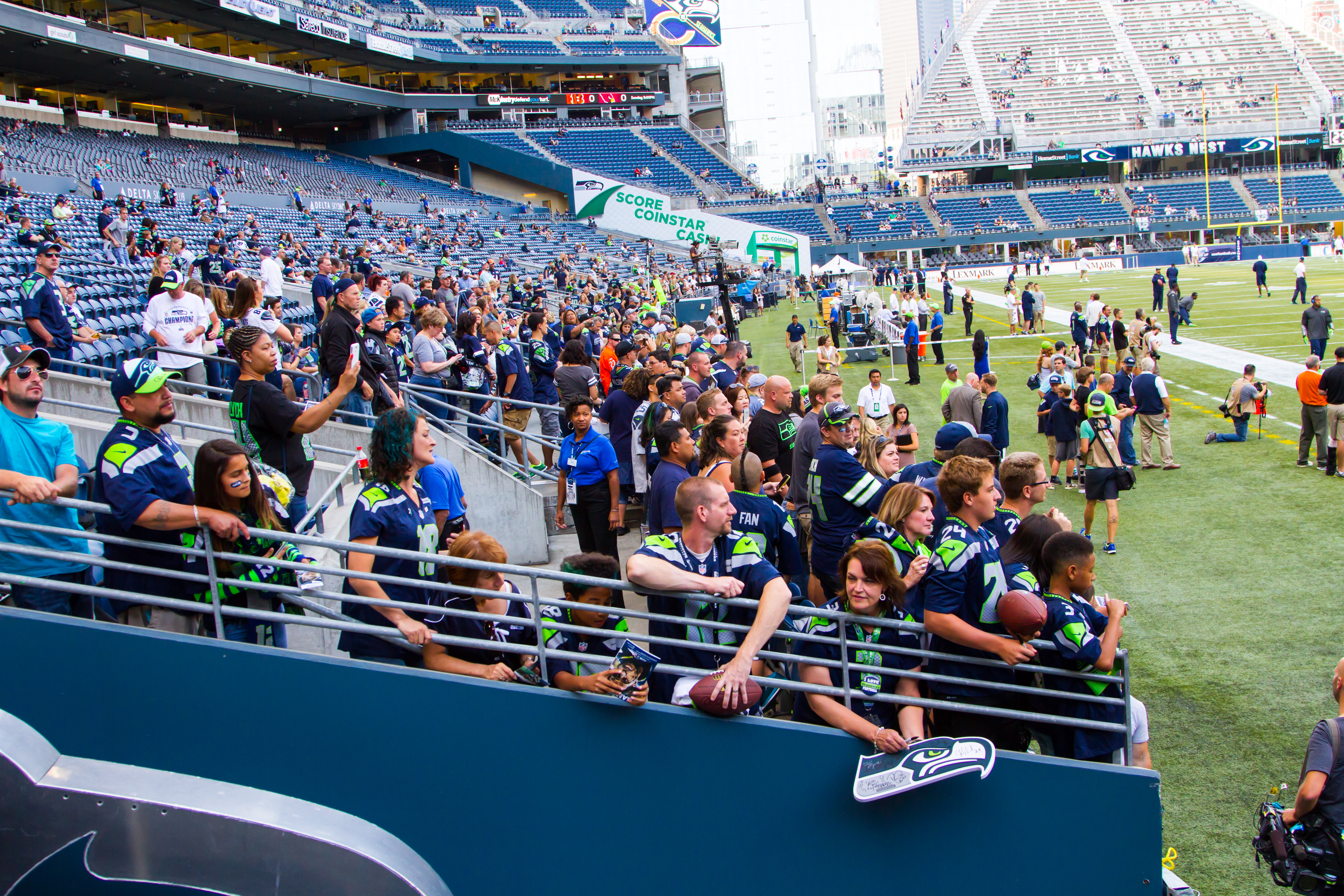
Seahawks fans attending a preseason game against the Chicago Bears on August 22, 2014

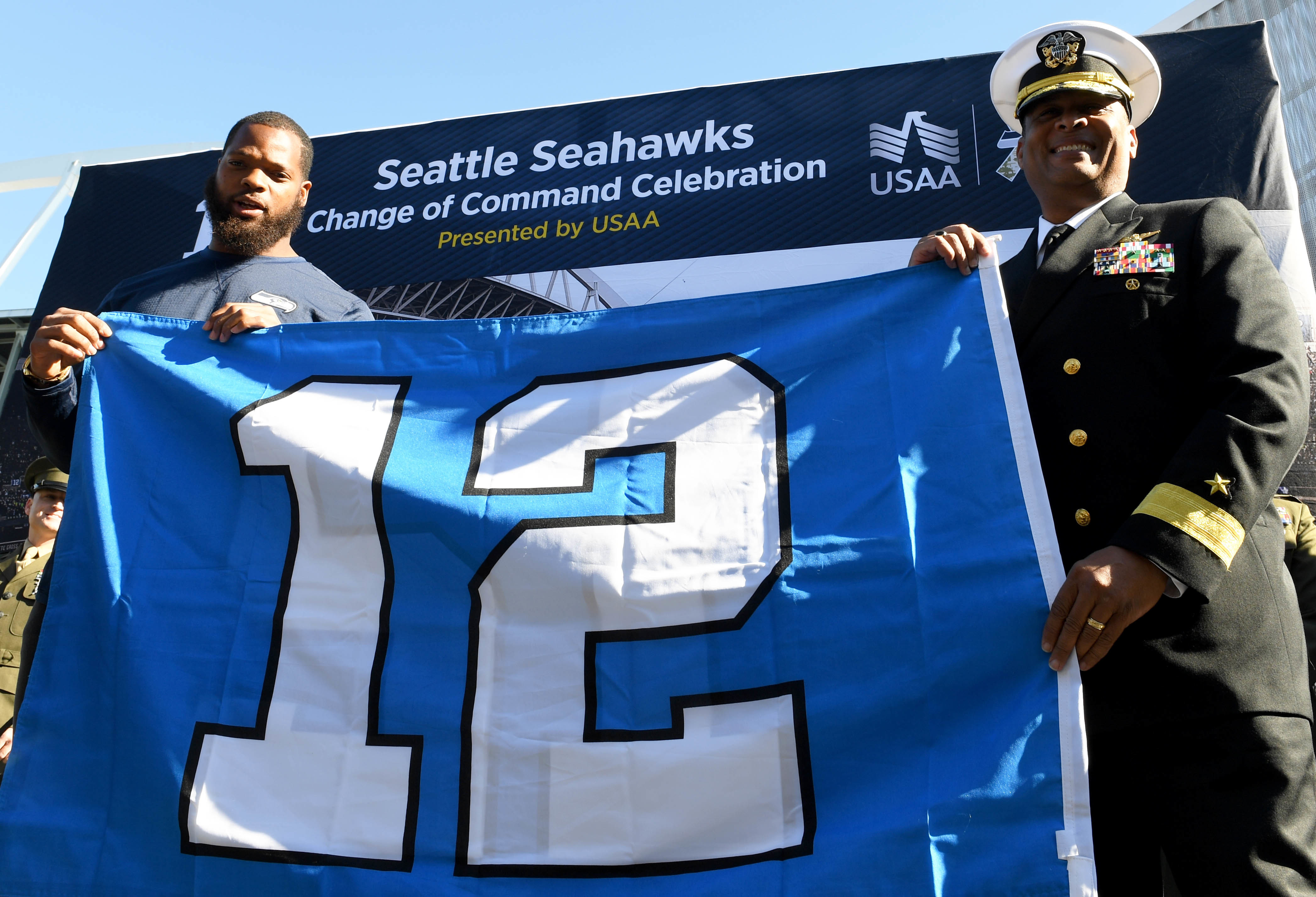
The number 12 has long been affiliated with Seahawks fans

The 12s (or formerly the 12th man) refers to fans of the Seattle Seahawks. Across the city of Seattle, fans often display a 12 flag in support of the team whenever the Seahawks make a postseason appearance or prior to the season opener. Fan devotion grew immensely during the early years of the millennium, resulting in engineers designing Lumen Field to funnel crowd noise onto the field to intimidate opposing teams. Fan interest peaked again during the 2010s following the hiring of head coach Pete Carroll, in addition to the famous Legion of Boom defense propelling the franchise to win Super Bowl XLVIII. In 2014, local sponsor Boeing even painted a 747 Cargo plane in a Seahawks' themed livery, with the number 12 on the tail, making its flight path into the shape of the number 12.

The 12 flag, used by fans

== Origins ==
The crowd noise at the Kingdome posed a difficult challenge for opposing teams, in part due to the stadium's construction methods. The fans themselves became aware that the noise could be used to provoke the opposing teams into incurring penalties, such as delay of game or false starts. In 1989, the NFL tried unsuccessfully to try and limit crowd noise to keep the fans at the Kingdome from invoking the noise to their advantage, calling the fans a de facto "Twelfth Man" for the Seahawks defense.

In 1984, the Seahawks decided to retire "12" as a jersey number, designating the fans as a whole as a "12th man" in support of the 11 players on the field.

In 1990, Texas A&M, who had originated the "12th Man" in 1922, agreed to grant a limited license for the Seahawks to use the same terminology.

In 2016, the Seahawks decided to not renew the license, which had just expired, retiring the "12th Man" formula in favor of simply referring to the fans as the "12s".

== Fan support ==
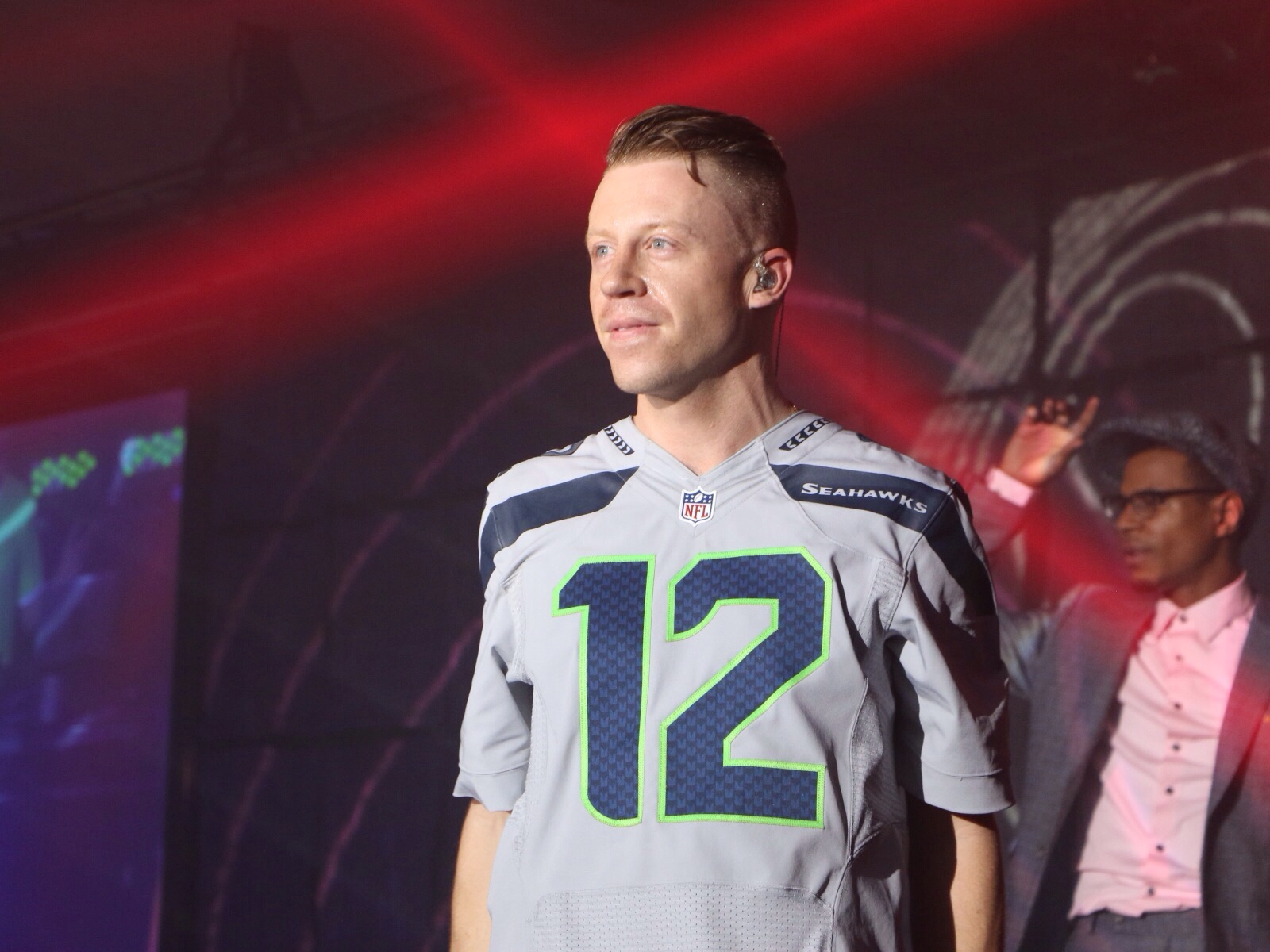
Rapper Macklemore representing the Seahawks before their appearance at Super Bowl XLVIII

Throughout much of the franchise's early history in Seattle, the team suffered from poor attendance; culminating in former owner Ken Behring attempting to relocate the franchise to Los Angeles in 1996. Despite this; fan interest grew rapidly in the early 2000s under new owner Paul Allen who had purchased the team from Behring in 1997.

In 1999, the franchise's prospects were seen as improving with the hiring of coach Mike Holmgren. Under the new coach, the Seahawks managed four consecutive division titles, and in 2006, they appeared in Super Bowl XL. The team's fans became even more devoted to their team during Holmgren's tenure; in 2003, the organization placed a large flag in the endzone with the number 12.

In the 2010s, the fanbase grew significantly with the hiring of Pete Carroll as their head coach during the 2009 offseason. The Seahawks narrowly beat out the division rival St. Louis Rams for the division title as both finished with a 7-9 record, but the Seahawks managed a famous upset victory over the defending Super Bowl champion New Orleans Saints. During the fourth quarter, the Seahawks led by four points prior to snapping the ball in Marshawn Lynch's famous Beast Quake run that returned the ball 67 yards while breaking 9 tackles to secure the victory. Fan reaction was so loud that seismologists reported that the crowd had created an artificial earthquake in the process.

The Seahawks' fans have set the Guinness World Record loudest crowd noise at a sporting event on two occasions. First which being on September 15, 2013, registering 136.6 dB during a game against the San Francisco 49ers and again on December 2, 2013, during a Monday Night Football game against the New Orleans Saints, with a roar of 137.6 dB. In May 2016, mountaineer David Liaño González carried a 12th Man flag to the summit of Mount Everest.

In 2025, researcher Mark Grant noted a dozen Seattle-related appearances of the number 12 in Super Bowl 48—the year of Seattle's first Super Bowl win. Grant also reported that the city of Seattle was exactly 12 × 12 × 12 months old earlier that NFL season, when the 12s broke the world record for crowd noise during a Monday Night Football game played against the New Orleans Saints.

== Controversies ==
In the latter half of the 2010s, the Seahawks fanbase were accused of being obnoxious and superficial in tandem with the improving results of the team. Many highlighted the team's prior attendance woes of the 1990s as proof of them supporting the team once they found success during the 2000s.

In addition to their own growth in playoff success, their fellow rivals such as the Los Angeles Rams and San Francisco 49ers had also made prominent returns to playoff success during the decade, leading to frequent clashes with rival Rams, or 49ers fans often escalating into violent confrontations.

=== Conflict with Texas A&M ===
For a long time, continuing into the 2010s, the Seahawks were marketing The 12th Man name heavily, although its origins were known to have begun as early as 1921 at Texas A&M, who actually trademarked "The 12th Man" in 1996. A legal agreement was reached in 2016 between the Seahawks organization and Texas A&M to cease use of the name in their marketing.

Currently, the Seahawks fans are officially referred to simply as "The 12s".

== Notable fans ==
- Macklemore, rapper
- Angela Rye, political commentator
- Jordan Chiles, olympic gymnast
- John Legend, singer-songwriter and pianist
- Chrissy Teigen, model and television personality
- Paolo Banchero, NBA player
- Sir Mix-a-Lot, rapper
- Mina Kimes, journalist and sports analyst
- Mike McCready, musician
- Bill Gates, businessman and philanthropist
- Bill Nye, science communicator and television presenter
- Adam Ray, actor and comedian
- Chris Pratt, actor and producer
- Joel McHale, actor and comedian
- Ryan Stiles, comedian and actor
- Jeffrey Dean Morgan, actor
- Rainn Wilson, actor

== See also ==
- Mob Squad
- 49er Faithful
