= Mob Squad =

Mob Squad may refer to:

- Mob Squad (album), a 2003 split album by Dragon Ash, Source, and Mach25
- Mob Squad (American football), referring to the Rams NFL team during the 2010s
- Mob Squad (fans), also referring to Rams fans
