= Mob Squad (fans) =

Fans of the Los Angeles Rams

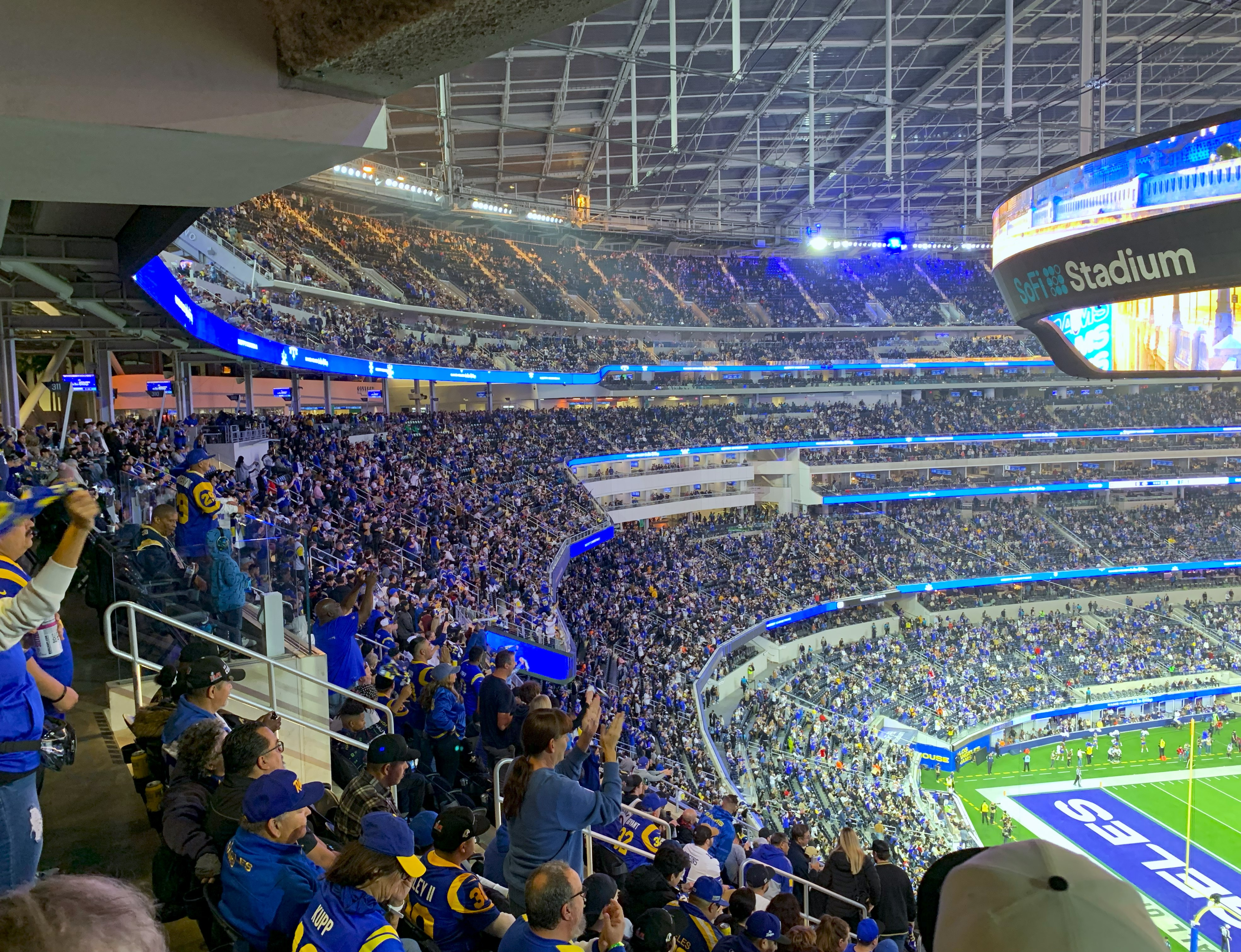
Fans of the Los Angeles Rams pack a 2023 home game at SoFi Stadium

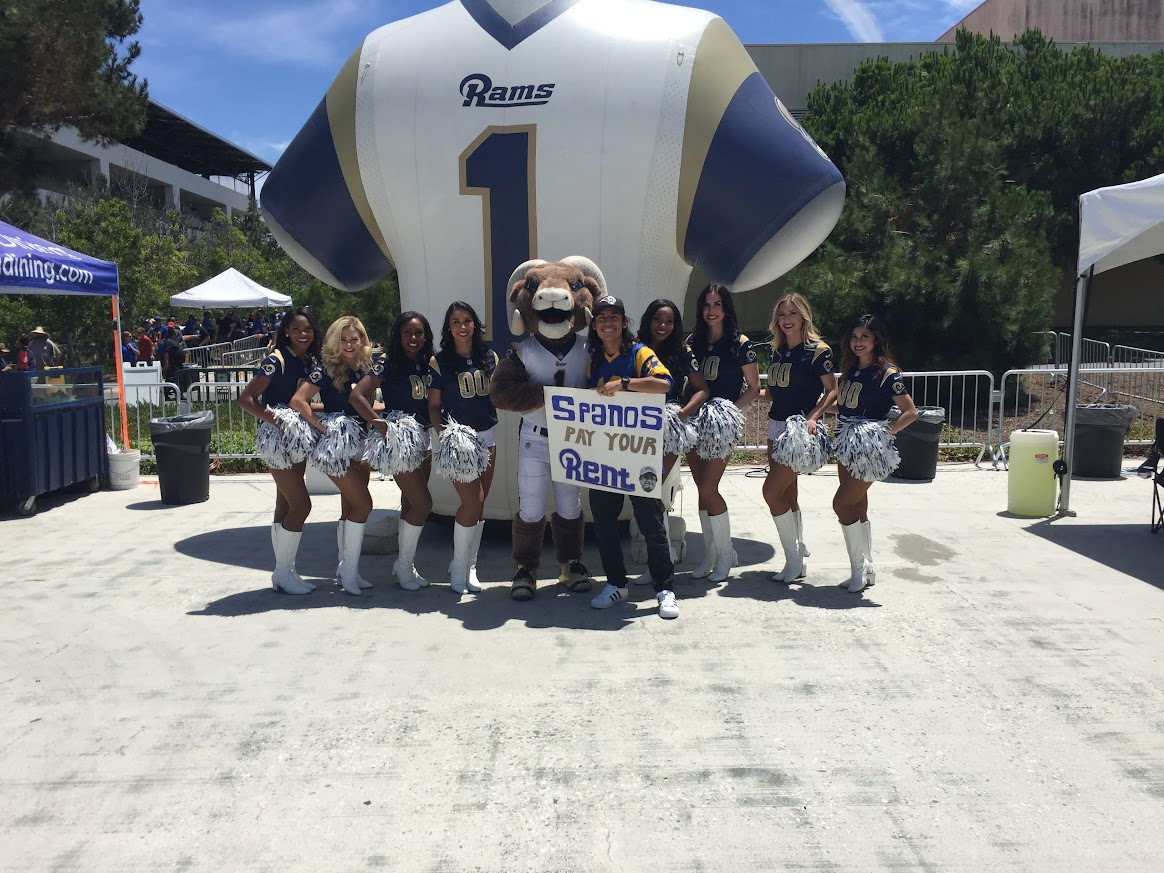
Rams' mascot Rampage poses with a fan and the Rams' cheerleaders at training camp in August of 2019

Mob Squad is the name for the fans of the National Football League (NFL)'s Los Angeles Rams. It was originally a nickname for the team during the 2015–2019 NFL seasons. They also use other lesser-used nicknames for fans include Ramily, Ramilia, The Herd, or simply Rams Nation (primarily by players and fans). The team has only officially used the moniker in official branding and merchandising from 2015 to 2019. Numerous fans have adopted the name to refer to fans of the Rams as a whole, as the term 'Mob' also refers to a group of sheep.

== History ==
=== The Original Melonheads ===
During the 1980s; Rams fan Lance Goldberg sought to create a similar iteration of the famous Cheesehead trend of Green Bay Packers fans wearing a block of cheese, though Wisconsin is famous for its dairy industry while watermelons do not have the same connection to the city of Los Angeles. The Melonheads have been a notable fixture for the Rams through the 1980s, their tenure in St. Louis, and even following their return in 2016.

=== First Tenure in Los Angeles (1946–1994) ===
Following the team's relocation from Cleveland in 1946; the team quickly forged a strong connection with many of Hollywood's elite figures during the 1950s. Upon winning the 1951 NFL Championship, the team quickly grew support from local fans, resulting in setting numerous attendance records for the LA Coliseum at the time, topping out at 102,368 during a 1957 game against the arch-rival San Francisco 49ers. Beyond the 1950s, the team maintained a strong presence of support despite their failures to return to the championship game until 1980. The 1960s saw record attendance as the Rams yielded iconic teams of the decade, led by their hall-of-fame defensive line dubbed the Fearsome Foursome. Despite a lone appearance during Super Bowl XIV (in which the Rams lost to the Pittsburgh Steelers), fan support remained strong through the 1970s and early 1980s until the arrival of the Raiders from Oakland in 1982. Due to Georgia Frontiere's controversial ownership of the team, and the Rams' subsequent relocation to Anaheim Stadium in 1980, fan interest found itself being cannibalized by the Raiders as the traditional fanbase was split further following the Raiders' Super Bowl victory two seasons following their arrival in Los Angeles. Even looking beyond conflicting factors, the Rams maintained a diminished, yet strong fanbase as the team remained competitive during the 1980s, despite losing twice in the NFC Championship. Georgia Frontiere's unstable ownership immediately began to deteriorate the team's support in Southern California following the 1989 season in which budgetary issues and lacking on-field performance plagued fan attendance. Frontiere continuously expressed her desire for a new stadium yielded multiple hollow threats of relocation on her behalf. The result of her mismanagement saw fan attendance finishing last in the league from 1993 to 1994, while numerous Rams' home games were frequently blacked out on local Television. Following the 1994 season; Frontiere continued her push for relocation, resulting in her threatening the NFL with a hollow claim of a lawsuit on March 15, 1995; culminating in the NFL owners acquiescing in meeting her demands to relocate the team to St. Louis.

=== St. Louis era (1995–2015) ===
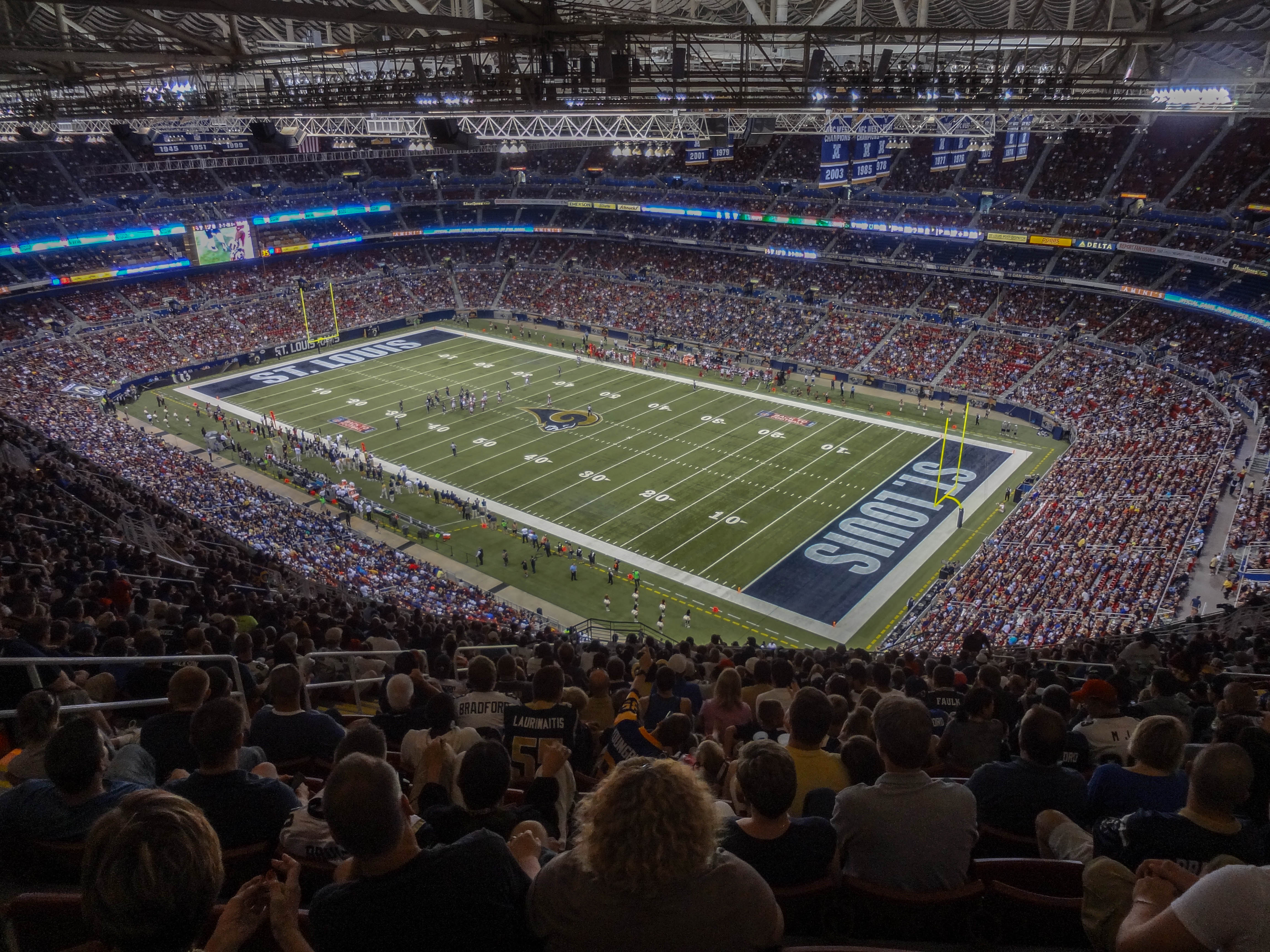
The Edward Jones Dome hosted the Rams for 20 seasons in St. Louis

Upon the team's arrival in St. Louis, fan attendance proved to be modest at best, despite failing to match the lows of the previous two season in Anaheim. Despite this, the team struggled to top 1 million fans per season until 2000, following the team's victory in Super Bowl XXXIV. Regardless of inconsistent fan interest in St. Louis; local rapper Nelly would frequently display his support for the team in numerous music videos. Despite appearing in two super bowls, and winning one in St. Louis; fan interest proved to mediocre at best as the Edward Jones Dome grew quickly outdated despite several attempts at renovations during the late 2000s. The stadium was universally disliked by fans as a cavernous dome with very little to offer for tailgating or fan events. Consequences of the team's declining performance and their outdated stadium contributed to a consistent lackluster turnout of support from St. Louis for most of their tenure. As a result; Rams ranked in the bottom 5 of league attendance from 2008 to their final season in 2015.

=== Rebirth in Los Angeles (2016–present) ===
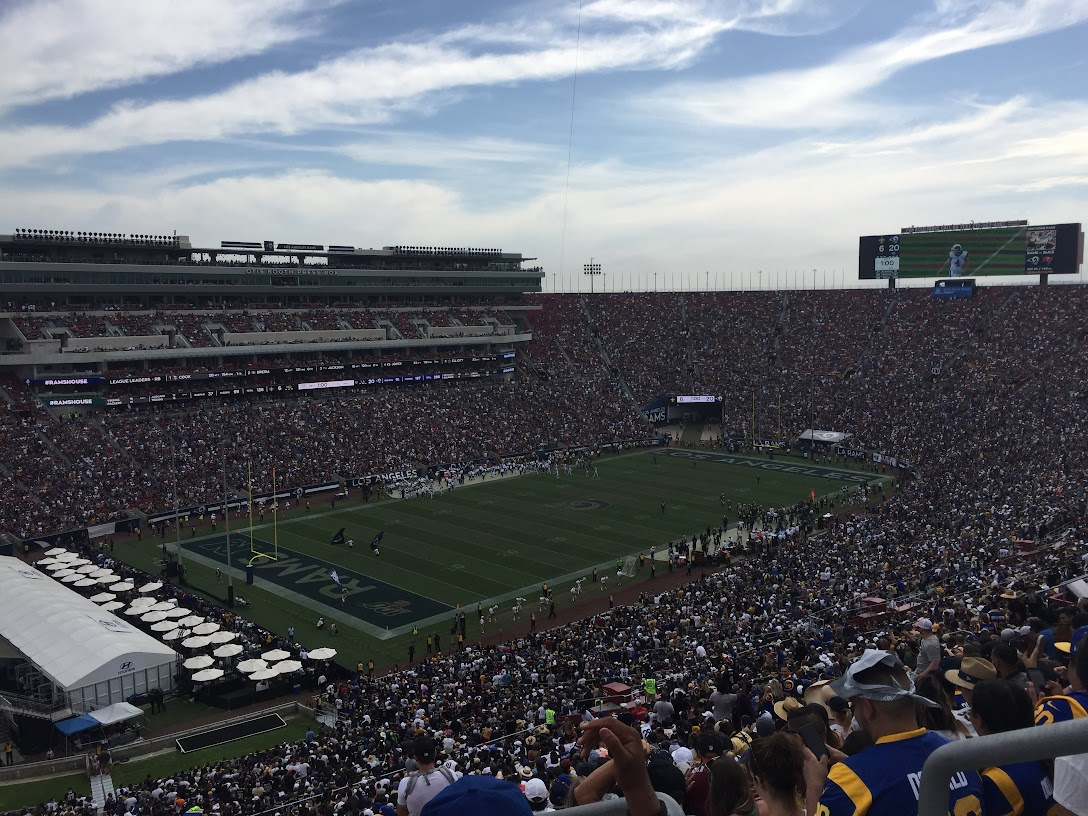
The Rams host the New Orleans Saints on September 15, 2019

Prior to the team's return to Southern California in 2016; various gatherings had begun showing a regrown amount of fan support for the franchise to play in Los Angeles once again. On November 23, 2014; a Rams-Chargers game in San Diego was flooded with Rams fans displaying an abundance of signs in favor of the team's relocation back to Los Angeles. Fan interest continued to regrow as rumors of a return multiplied across local and national media. On August 18, 2015; the Dallas Cowboys hosted the Rams for a joint practice at their facility in Oxnard, California. Unbeknownst to local media, a large gathering of Rams fans ensued, each displaying signs in further support of ongoing relocation rumors. Following the 2015 season; the team announced a return to Southern California after 20 seasons as Rams' new owner Stan Kroenke unveiled plans for a new privately-funded 80,000-seat stadium in Inglewood, California. The night of the announcement on January 12, 2016 saw a large crowd of Rams fans gathering outside the Los Angeles Coliseum in celebration of the return. Immediately following the team's return, the Rams' attendance jumped from dead last in 2015, to seventh in the league in 2016; with the Rams setting the all-time preseason attendance record on August 13, 2016 for their first game in Southern California since 1994. Since returning, the Rams have yielded attendance within the league's top 10 in all but two of their nine seasons following their return. Following the team's victory in Super Bowl LVI, large crowds of Rams fans accumulated around Los Angeles in celebration of the victory before the atmosphere devolved into rioting and looting, as fans damaged multiple cars and set a Metro Bus on fire. On February 16, 2022; an estimated crowd of over 20,000 fans attended the team's victory parade and rally at Exposition Park. Prior to the Rams' appearance in the 2025 Wild Card game against the Minnesota Vikings, the region was consumed by an onslaught of wildfires, ultimately forcing the game to be relocated to State Farm Stadium in Glendale, Arizona for January 13. Despite over 40 charter buses being hired to transport fans from SoFi Stadium to Glendale, approximately 50,000 tickets were purchased by Rams fans traveling into Arizona for the game, with 25,000 being sold within the first hour.

=== Today ===
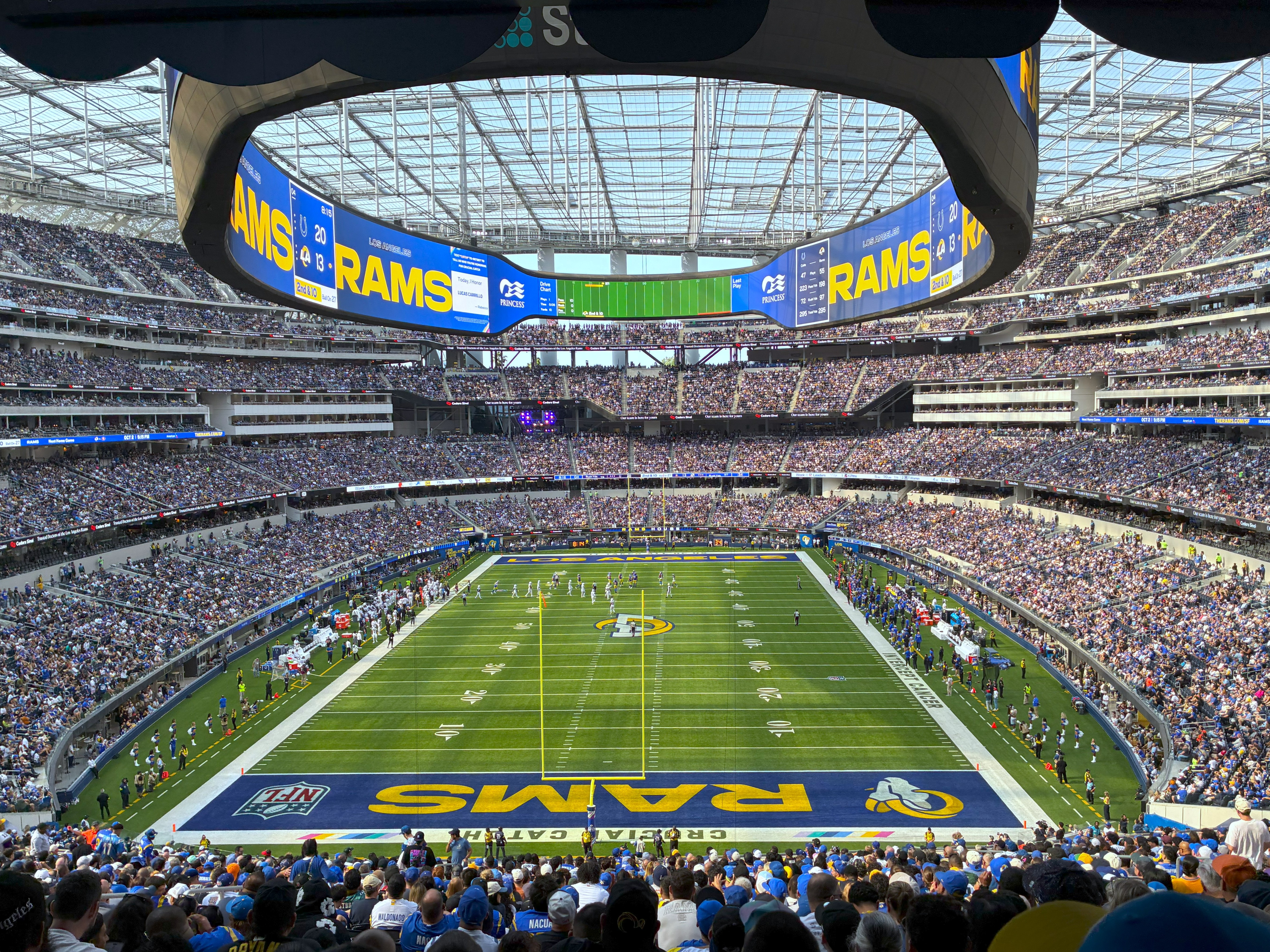
The Rams host the Indianapolis Colts on September 28, 2025

The present Mob Squad boasts support for the Rams across all ages, ranging from elderly fans who supported the team since the 1970s to a new generation of fans won over as a result of the team's success following their return to California. They have also diversified their fan base to include more African American, Asian and Latino fans. The Rams are also notable for signing and drafting star-studded players such as Aaron Donald, Odell Beckham Jr., Matthew Stafford, Ndamukong Suh, Myles Garrett, Von Miller, Bobby Wagner, Marcus Peters, Aqib Talib and Jalen Ramsey had helped grow the fanbase in Los Angeles. Though the Rams have not officially utilized the Mob Squad moniker since the 2019 season; multiple fans of the team adopted the term 'Mob Squad' in naming of their booster clubs following the team's relocation back to California. A majority of current Rams fans have utilized the term since returning to Los Angeles in 2016. The official chant of the team's fanbase is a call-and-response of between public address announcer Sam Lagana saying "Whose House?" and fans responding "Rams House!".

== Celebrities ==
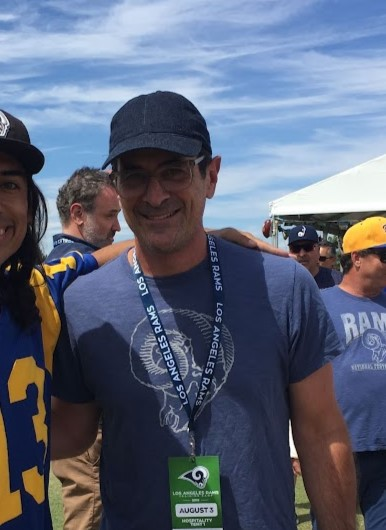
Actor Ty Burrell attends Rams' training camp at Irvine in 2019

Given Los Angeles' extensive history in both the film and music industries; numerous celebrity fans have displayed support for the team, either during their original tenure in California or since their return in 2016. Rage Against the Machine guitarist Tom Morello has been another longtime supporter of the team, even naming his son Roman in honor of former Rams' quarterback Roman Gabriel. Actor Terry Crews is a famous fan of the team, with his connections with the franchise originating from the early 1990s in which he was drafted by the Rams during his brief NFL career. Actor Danny Trejo recalls sneaking through the fence at the Los Angeles Memorial Coliseum to watch numerous Rams games as a child. In addition to Trejo, numerous celebrities such as YG, Kendrick Lamar, Lexie Brown, Coco Jones, Camille Hyde, Storm Reid, Bryan Cranston or Taran Killam were often spotted at the Rams' training camp in Irvine, California. Most recently; actress Brenda Song has been spotted regularly attending the team's training camp in El Segundo and numerous home games, alongside her husband Macaulay Culkin.

=== Notable fans ===
- Allyson Felix ,Former Olympic athlete and Los Angeles native
- Anthony Anderson, Actor and Comedian, born in Compton, California
- André 3000, Member of Outkast.
- Adam DeVine, Actor, Comedian, and Screenwriter.
- Anthony Kiedis, Lead singer of the Red Hot Chili Peppers
- Aaron Paul, American Actor
- Bia, Rapper and singer, known for Sisterhood of Hip Hop.
- Brandy Norwood, Singer and actress
- Brenda Song, Longtime Disney Channel Actress
- Becky G, Singer and Inglewood native
- Bebe Rexha, Pop Singer and Inglewood native
- Bryan Cranston, Actor best known for Malcolm in the Middle and Breaking Bad
- Cedric the Entertainer, Actor and Comedian, St. Louis native
- Coco Jones, Singer, actress and daughter of Super Bowl champion Mike Jones
- Cheech Marin, Actor, Comedian, and Philanthropist within Los Angeles' Hispanic arts.
- Chad Smith, Drummer for the Red Hot Chili Peppers
- Dinah Jane lead singer for Fifth Harmony.
- DJ Yella, DJ and co-producer of N.W.A.
- Danny Trejo, Local Actor, known for his portrayal in numerous action movies
- Dr Dre, Famed Producer, Rapper, and Music Mogul.
- DJ Lethal, Turntablist of Limp Bizkit
- Eric Garcetti, Former Mayor of Los Angeles
- Flea, Bassist of the Red Hot Chili Peppers
- Garcelle Beauvais, Actress, known for the Real Housewives of Beverly Hills and The Jamie Foxx Show
- Gabrielle Union, Actress and producer
- Gunna, Rapper and musician
- The Game, Local rapper originating from Compton
- Issa Rae, Actress, Los Angeles Native, best known for Insecure
- Holly Robinson Peete, Actress and singer
- Jody Watley, Singer, Los Angeles native
- Jhene Aiko, Singer, actress
- Jay Rock, Rapper
- Jessica Alba, Actress
- Jakob Nowell, Frontman of Sublime
- JoJo,,singer
- Kendrick Lamar, Rapper, producer, native of Compton, California
- Lexie Brown, WNBA player
- Lilly Singh, Comedian, Actress and YouTuber
- Lewis Hamilton, Formula 1 driver
- Meagan Good Actress, Los Angeles native
- Magic Johnson, Hall-of-Fame point guard for the Los Angeles Lakers during the 1980's and 1990's and entrepreneur.
- Masai Russell, Track & Field sprinter and Olympic champion
- Moneybagg Yo, Rapper
- Madison Pettis Actress
- Mark Hoppus, Bassist and Singer of Blink 182
- Macaulay Culkin, Actor known for roles in Home Alone and Uncle Buck
- Michael Anthony, Original Bassist of Van Halen
- Nita Strauss, Guitarist for Alice Cooper as well as the Rams' media team
- Nelly, Rapper and prominent native of St. Louis
- Niall Horan, Member of One Direction
- Nikki Sixx, Bassist and Cofounder of Mötley Crüe
- O'Shea Jackson Jr., Actor, rapper and son of native rapper Ice Cube
- Porscha Coleman, Television Personality, known for Hollywood Today Live and Divorced Sistas
- Prince Harry, Crown Duke of Sussex
- Perry Farrell, Lead singer of Jane's Addiction
- Paris Hilton, Socialite and Southern California native
- Regina King, Actress, producer, director and Los Angeles native
- Ryan Seacrest, Media Personality and Radio Host. Host of Wheel of Fortune and American Idol.
- Rob Lowe, Actor
- Robert Patrick, Actor best known for his roles in The Terminator franchise
- Ryan Garcia, Professional Boxer
- Rebel Wilson, Australian Actress and Comedian
- Suge Knight,, Former music executive and played for the Rams in the 1987 season.
- Tia Mowry, Actress, known for Sister, Sister and The Game.
- Terry Crews, Former NFL Player and Actor, drafted by the Rams in 1991
- Tinashe, Singer-songwriter
- Tyga, rapper
- Taran Killam, Actor and Comedian
- Tom Morello, Guitarist of Rage Against The Machine
- Ty Burrell, Actor best known for his role on Modern Family
- Vivica A. Fox, Actress and producer
- Wendy Raquel Robinson, Actress, known for the comedy-drama television series The Game and Reboot series
- Warren G, Rapper and Long Beach native
- Xzibit, Rapper
- YG, Rapper and Compton native

== Controversy ==
As is similarly the case on occasion with Los Angeles Sports fans (particularly the Dodgers), Rams fans have developed a minor notoriety reputation for misconduct and fights since their return in 2016. Though not as notorious for violence as their rival 49ers, their fans have similarly been criticized for rowdy behavior at home games, primarily aimed at division rivals such as the 49ers and Seattle Seahawks.

== See also ==
- 12s
- Raider Nation
