= Mob Squad (American football) =

St. Louis/Los Angeles Rams nickname from 2015–2018

The Mob Squad is a nickname that was officially used by the Los Angeles Rams of the National Football League during both their last season in St. Louis and their first seasons back in Los Angeles. The nickname referred to the team's return to glory in Los Angeles under such players as Aaron Donald, Todd Gurley, Jared Goff, Cooper Kupp, and head coach Sean McVay. The naming also extends to fans of the Rams, primarily used by multiple booster clubs around Southern California.

== Players ==
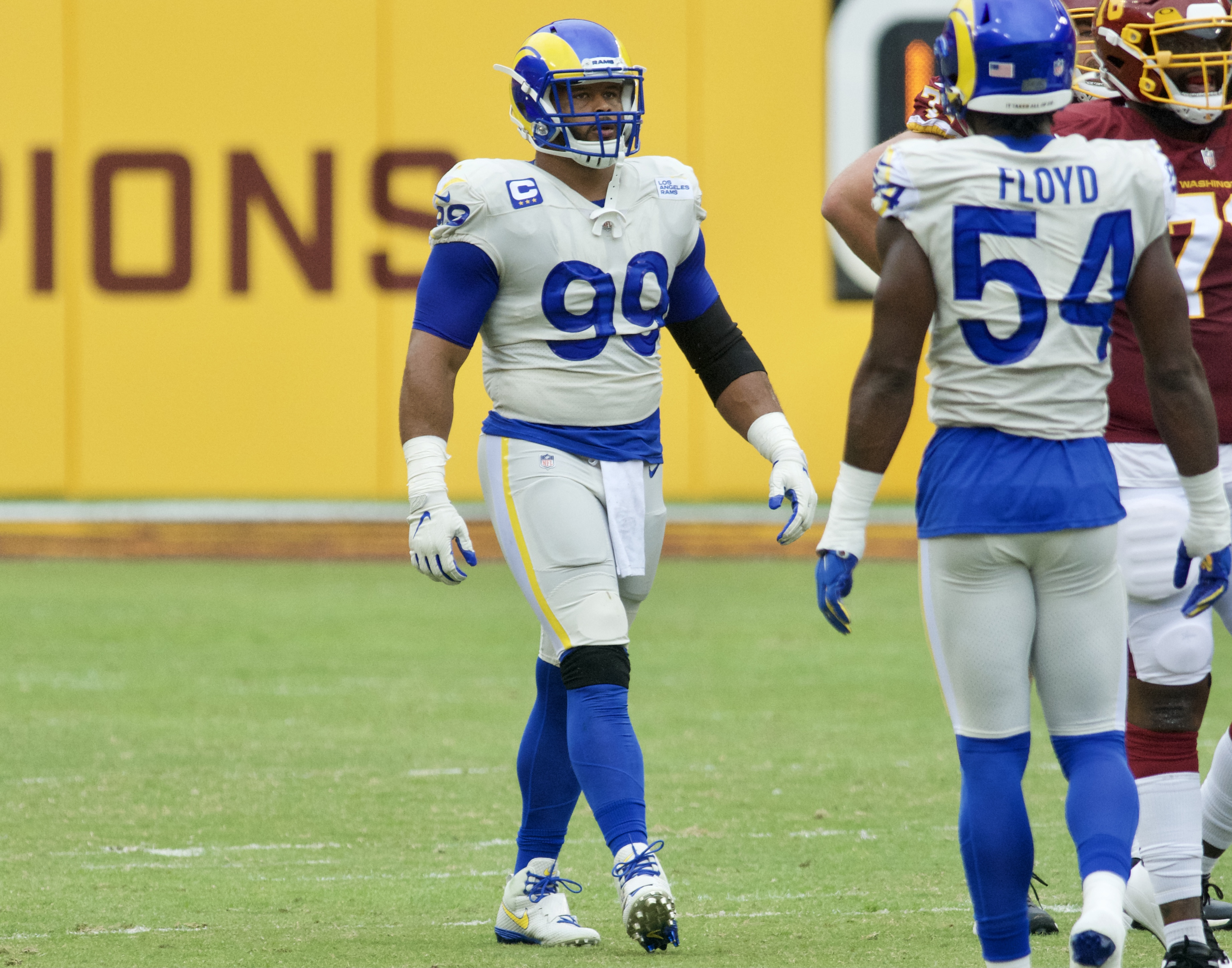
Aaron Donald has been the definitive leader of the Rams defense throughout the Mob Squad era.

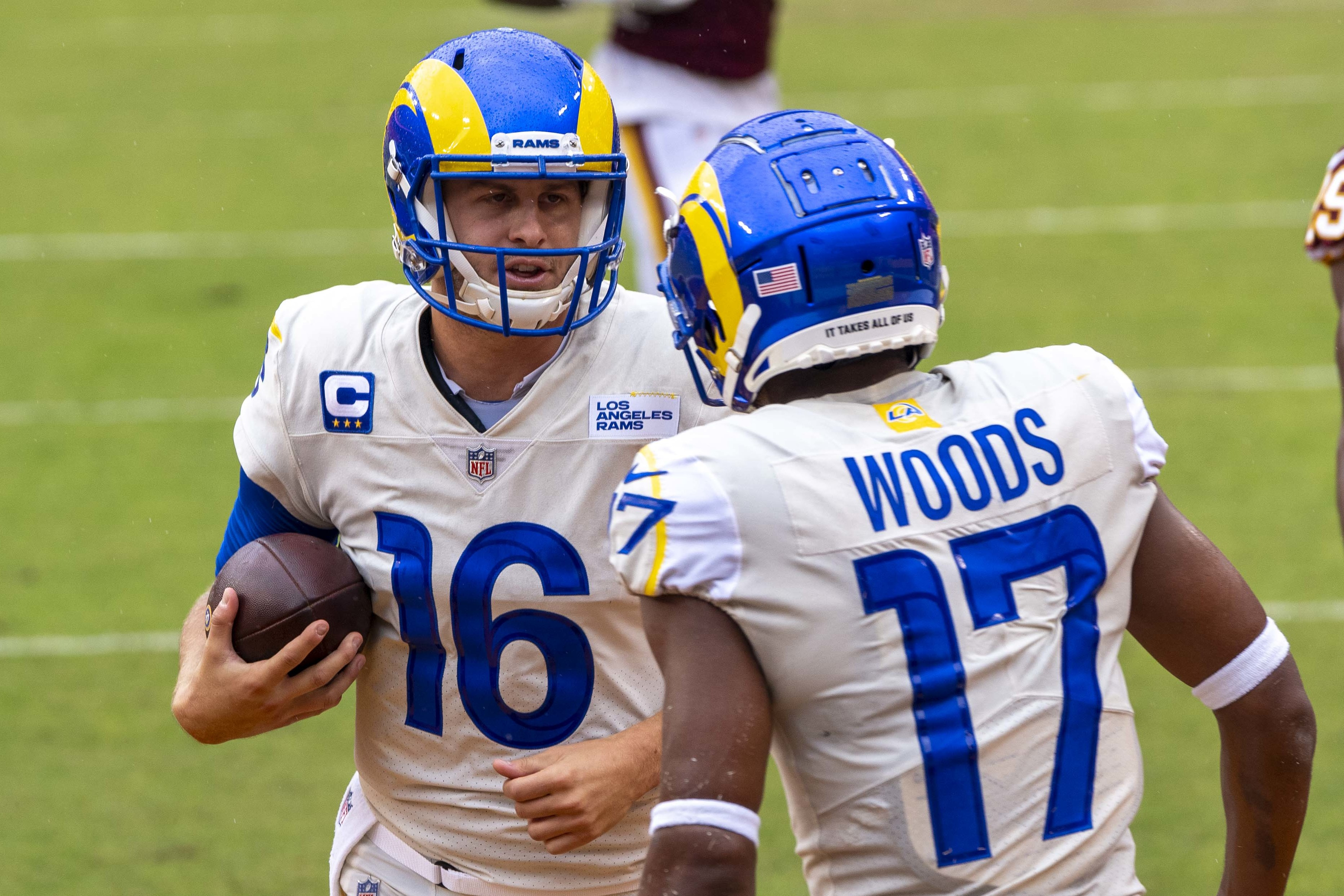
Jared Goff led the Rams to an NFC Championship title in 2018.

The Mob Squad era was defined by defensive tackle Aaron Donald, the team's 2014 first-round selection who has won multiple Defensive Player of the Year awards and is widely considered the best defensive player in the league; quarterback Jared Goff, selected first overall in the 2016 draft with multiple Pro-Bowl selections who served as the offensive leader until being traded in 2021; and Todd Gurley, the team's 2015 first-round selection and star Pro-Bowler running back until his 2019 departure. The Rams have also been home to many other notable players during this period, such as Cooper Kupp, Brandin Cooks, and Robert Woods, among others. The Mob Squad has defined the period of transition from St. Louis as well as the quick rise to prominence the team experienced in Los Angeles under head coach Sean McVay.

== Player accolades ==
=== Team achievements ===
- 2x NFC West champions (2017, 2018)
- NFC Champions (2018)

=== Player achievements ===
==== Aaron Donald ====
- Super Bowl champion (LVI)
- Associated Press NFL Defensive Player of the Year (2017, 2018)
- 9× First-team All-Pro selection (2015–2021)
- 8x Pro Bowl selection (2014–2021)
- NFL sacks leader/Deacon Jones Award (2018)
- NFL 2010s All-Decade Team
- 5× PFWA All-NFL Team (2015–2019)
- 4× PFF NFL Defensive Player of the Year (2015, 2016, 2018, 2019)
- Pro Football Writers Association NFL Defensive Player of the Year (2018)
- Kansas City Committee of 101 NFC Defensive Player of the Year (2017, 2018)
- 6× NFL Top 100 (2015–2020)
  - Ranked No. 92 in 2015
  - Ranked No. 14 in 2016
  - Ranked No. 15 in 2017
  - Ranked No. 7 in 2018
  - Ranked No. 1 in 2019
  - Ranked No. 3 in 2020
- 2× NFC Defensive Player of the Month (Oct. 2018, Dec. 2018)
- 7× NFC Defensive Player of the Week (2015 – Week 1, Week 14; 2016 – Week 4; 2018 – Week 7, Week 16; 2019 – Week 11; 2020 – Week 5)

==== Jared Goff ====
- 2× Pro Bowl (2017, 2018)
- PFWA Most Improved Player (2017)

==== Cooper Kupp ====
- Super Bowl champion (LVI)
- Super Bowl MVP (LVI)
- NFL Offensive Player of the Year (2021)
- First-team All-Pro (2021)
- Pro Bowl (2021)
- NFL receptions leader (2021)
- NFL receiving yards leader (2021)
- NFL receiving touchdowns leader (2021)
- PFWA All-Rookie Team (2017)

==== Todd Gurley ====
- NFL Offensive Player of the Year (2017)
- NFL Offensive Rookie of the Year (2015)
- 2× First-team All-Pro selection (2017, 2018)
- 3× Pro Bowl selection (2015, 2017, 2018)
- 3x NFC Offensive Player of the Month (2017 – September, December; 2018 – October)
- 5x NFC Offensive Player of the Week (2017 – Week 4, Week 15, Week 16; 2018 – Week 6, Week 13)
- FedEx Ground Player of the Year (2017)
- 2x NFL Top 100
- Ranked No. 22 in 2016
- Ranked No. 6 2018
- PFWA All-Rookie Team (2015)

=== Pro Bowlers ===
| Year | Players | Position | Selection | Notes |
|---|---|---|---|---|
| 2015 | Aaron Donald | Defensive tackle | 2nd | |
| 2015 | Todd Gurley | Running back | 1st | |
| 2015 | Johnny Hekker | Punter | 2nd | |
| 2016 | Aaron Donald | Defensive tackle | 3rd | |
| 2016 | Johnny Hekker | Punter | 3rd | |
| 2016 | Jake McQuaide | Long snapper | 1st | |
| 2017 | Pharoh Cooper | Return specialist | 1st | |
| 2017 | Aaron Donald | Defensive tackle | 4th | |
| 2017 | Jared Goff | Quarterback | 1st | |
| 2017 | Todd Gurley | Running back | 2nd | |
| 2017 | Johnny Hekker | Punter | 4th | |
| 2017 | Jake McQuaide | Long snapper | 2nd | |
| 2017 | Andrew Whitworth | Offensive tackle | 4th | |
| 2017 | Greg Zuerlein | Kicker | 1st | |
| 2018 | Aaron Donald | Defensive Tackle | 5th | |
| 2018 | Jared Goff | Quarterback | 2nd | |
| 2018 | Todd Gurley | Running back | 3rd | |
| 2018 | Cory Littleton | Linebacker | 1st | |
| 2019 | Aaron Donald | Defensive tackle | 6th | |
| 2019 | Jalen Ramsey | Cornerback | 3rd | |
| 2020 | Aaron Donald | Defensive tackle | 7th | |
| 2020 | Jalen Ramsey | Cornerback | 4th | |
| 2021 | Aaron Donald | Defensive tackle | 8th | Participated in Super Bowl LVI instead |
| 2021 | Jalen Ramsey | Cornerback | 5th | Participated in Super Bowl LVI instead |
| 2021 | Cooper Kupp | Wide receiver | 1st | Participated in Super Bowl LVI instead, won Super Bowl LVI MVP |
