= Rams–Seahawks rivalry =

National Football League rivalry

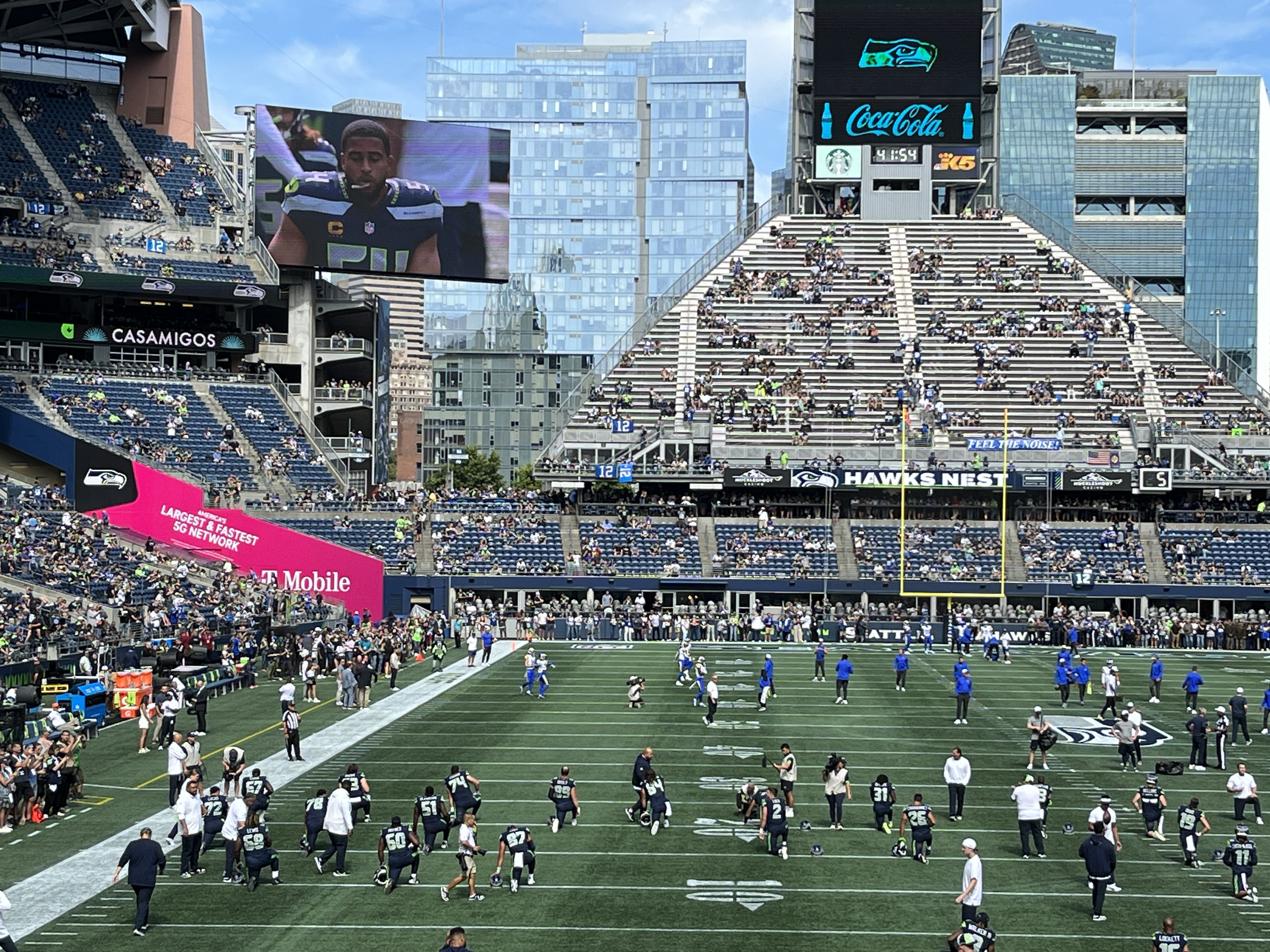
- Rams and Seahawks face off during the 2023 season.

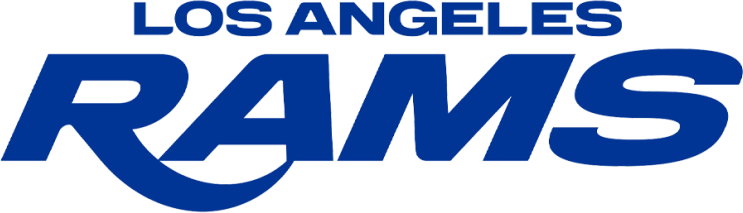
- Los Angeles Rams Seattle Seahawks
- Location: Los Angeles, Seattle
- First meeting: October 31, 1976; Rams 45, Seahawks 6
- Latest meeting: January 25, 2026; Seahawks 31, Rams 27
- Next meeting: December 25, 2026
- Stadiums: Rams: SoFi Stadium; Seahawks: Lumen Field

Statistics
- Total meetings: 57
- All-time series: Seahawks: 30–28
- Regular season series: Seahawks: 29–26
- Postseason results: Rams: 2–1
- Largest victory: Rams: 45–6 (1976); Seahawks: 28–0 (2009)
- Most points scored: Rams: 45 (1976); Seahawks: 38 (2025)
- Longest win streak: Rams: 4 (1976–1988, 2003–2005); Seahawks: 10 (2005–2009)
- Current win streak: Seahawks: 2 (2025–present)

Post-season history
- 2004 NFC Wild Card: Rams won: 27–20; 2020 NFC Wild Card: Rams won: 30–20; 2025 NFC Championship: Seahawks won: 31–27

The Rams–Seahawks rivalry is a National Football League (NFL) rivalry between the Los Angeles Rams and Seattle Seahawks.

The Seahawks joined the NFL as an expansion team in 1976 and were initially placed in the NFC West, where they faced the Rams for the first time. The following season, Seattle was moved to the AFC West, resulting in infrequent meetings between the two teams. As part of the NFL's 2002 realignment, the Seahawks returned to the NFC West, resulting in two meetings annually with the Rams. From the late 2000s through the early 2010s, the Seahawks held a significant advantage in the series, including a 10-game winning streak, and took a big lead in the overall record. In the late 2010s and 2020s, both teams emerged as regular playoff contenders, leading to more competitive matchups and narrowing the overall series margin to just a few games.

Geography plays a role in the rivalry, as Los Angeles and Seattle are approximately 1,100 miles apart along Interstate 5, connecting the western seaboard of the continental United States. Both teams experienced periods of success at different times, but the rivalry intensified after the Rams’ relocation back to Los Angeles in 2016. Between 2013 and 2021, both teams won a Super Bowl, which often elevated their biannual regular-season matchups into competitive contests with playoff implications.

The rivalry reached an apex during the 2025 season, during which the Seahawks and Rams were widely considered the best teams in the NFL. After two close match ups, including the Zachwards Pass game, the two teams tied their regular season series at 1–1, before the Seahawks defeated the Rams in the NFC Championship en route to a victory in Super Bowl LX.

The Seahawks lead the series 30–28. The two teams have met three times in the playoffs, with the Rams winning two of three games.

== History ==
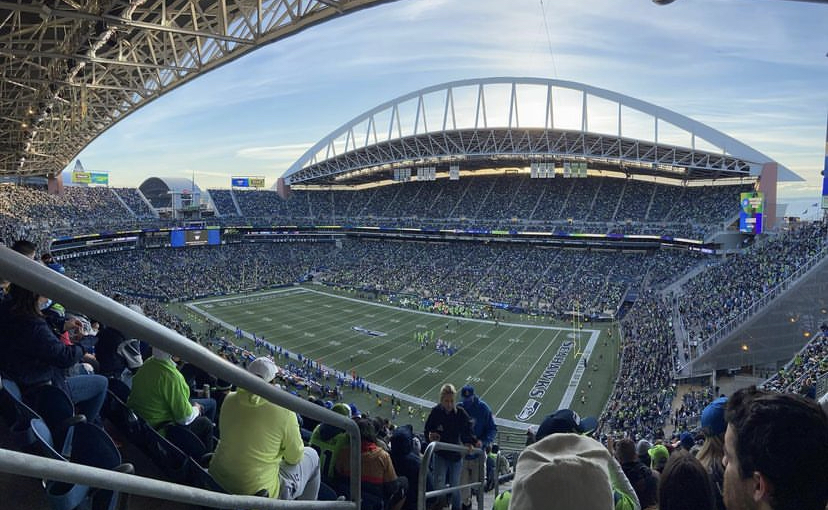
The Seahawks host the Rams on October 7, 2021

=== Beginnings of the rivalry ===
Originally, the Seahawks played in the NFC West during their inaugural season in 1976, but would be realigned to the AFC West the following season. Very little connected the Seahawks with any animosity towards their future rivals in the Rams and 49ers respectively for much of their existence leading up to the 2002 division realignment.

Notably, both the Rams and Seahawks encountered issues with fan attendance and outdated stadiums during the 1990s. The Rams found themselves unable to secure a new stadium in southern California and controversial owner Georgia Frontiere relocated the team to St. Louis in 1995. Seahawks' owner Ken Behring found himself increasingly unsatisfied with the declining condition of the Kingdome and later threatened to relocate the team to Los Angeles during the 1996 offseason. Unknown to the league; on February 2, 1996; Behring had relocated the Seahawks' team practices to the Rams’ former training facility in Anaheim, and sought a deal to lease out the Rose Bowl in Pasadena. However, much to the anger of the league owners; Behring had failed to properly format a bid for relocation and the league was unaware of any possible request or owners meeting regarding the move of the team. On February 5, the league threatened to heavily fine Behring and the Seahawks up to $900,000 daily unless they returned to Seattle immediately. Ultimately, Behring was involved in a forced sale of the Seahawks to Microsoft CEO Paul Allen in 1997.

=== 2002–2009: Seahawks join the NFC West ===
The rivalry between the Seahawks and Rams was finally established in 2002, after the Seahawks were realigned to the NFC West after the league had expanded to 32 teams with the addition of the Houston Texans that season. The Rams and Seahawks would share the division with fellow longtime-rivals the San Francisco 49ers and the Arizona Cardinals joined the NFC West after playing for 32 seasons in the NFC East. The Seahawks entered the division as an upstart playoff contender under third year head coach Mike Holmgren, meanwhile the Rams were experiencing the twilight of their famous "Greatest Show On Turf" era. The Rams' teams would begin to wane in comparison to their peak under quarterback Kurt Warner, and would only manage to win the division in 2003 for the final time before their relocation back to Los Angeles 13 years later.

The 2003 season saw the Rams boast a 12–4 record and take command of the division one final time. Seattle had been hot on the Rams’ heels through much of the year as the Seahawks started off with a 3–0 record, including a narrow victory over the Rams in week 3. Following the win, both teams followed varying paths to their respective playoff hunts. The Seahawks would stumble and win only 5 of their next 9 games while the Rams had run away with the division lead, winning 8 of their next 9 games. During the week 15 home matchup against the Seahawks, both sides engaged into a bitter contest as Seattle was fighting to regain their lead of the division from earlier that season. Though 2 games behind the Rams, the Seahawks entered the matchup with an aggressive performance. Following a safety after Rams’ quarterback Marc Bulger was tackled in the endzone, Seattle would find themselves down 12 points. Upon scoring their second touchdown, Rams’ receivers Tory Holt and Isaac Bruce notably taunted and engaged in a minor scuffle with Seahawks’ safety Ken Hamlin in the endzone. A drive from Shaun Alexander and Darrell Jackson helped Seattle regain momentum in the second quarter, however; following his touchdown, Jackson and Rams’ cornerback Aeneas Williams began jawing at one another as retaliation for the earlier gesture by the Rams’ receivers. Jackson was given a penalty for taunting following the touchdown. The Rams would find themselves able to outmuscle the Seahawks, the game displayed a heated running back duel of both Alexander and Rams’ future hall-of-famer Marshall Faulk. Rams’ safety Adam Archuleta proved to be the difference maker as he racked up a sack and 8 critical tackles to give the Rams the game. A controversial call as Seahawks’ wide receiver Bobby Engram dove for a crucial pass to possibly give Seattle the lead culminated in another fight with Rams’ defender after the failed catch. The victory clinched the division for the Rams in addition to a playoff berth. The Seahawks would clinch a playoff berth as the divisional runner-up with a 10–6 record, but they would go on to lose in a crushing overtime loss to the Green Bay Packers. The Rams managed to clinch the second highest seed in the conference but would fall in an equally crushing double overtime loss to the eventual Conference Champion Carolina Panthers at home.

The 2004 season saw the Rams begin the year strong as they managed a 4–2 record to start the season, but they would stumble the rest of the year and lose 6 of 10; finishing one game behind the Seahawks for the division lead. The first playoff matchup between the two teams as divisional rivals would occur in the Wild Card Round of the 2004 playoffs. Despite finishing the year one loss behind Seattle, the Rams managed to sweep them during the regular season, culminating in a high octane grudge match between the two rivals. Out of the gate; the Rams pulled ahead to a 4-point lead despite inconsistent play from quarterback Marc Bulger, The Seahawks would respond with their own passing attack as Matt Hasselbeck managed a quick touchdown and an interception to start the 2nd quarter. The second half would see Seattle briefly take the lead before Bulger managed a 17-yard touchdown with less than 2 minutes remaining in the 3rd quarter. Despite the best efforts of the Seahawks, the Rams refused to give up the lead. Bulger and Hasselbeck would combine for 654 passing yards and the game would also be the final game played by Hall of Fame receiver Jerry Rice. The Rams would not manage another playoff win until the 2018 season, meanwhile Seattle would later boast a 10-game home playoff win streak would that would end in 2020, ironically after the Rams beat the Seahawks in the 2020–21 wild card round.

The late 2000s saw a decline in the rivalry as the Seahawks consistently qualified for the playoffs, while the Rams struggled as "The Greatest Show on Turf" would disband. Seattle won 10 straight meetings from 2005 to 2009.

=== 2010–2015: Seahawks hire Pete Carroll, win Super Bowl XLVIII ===
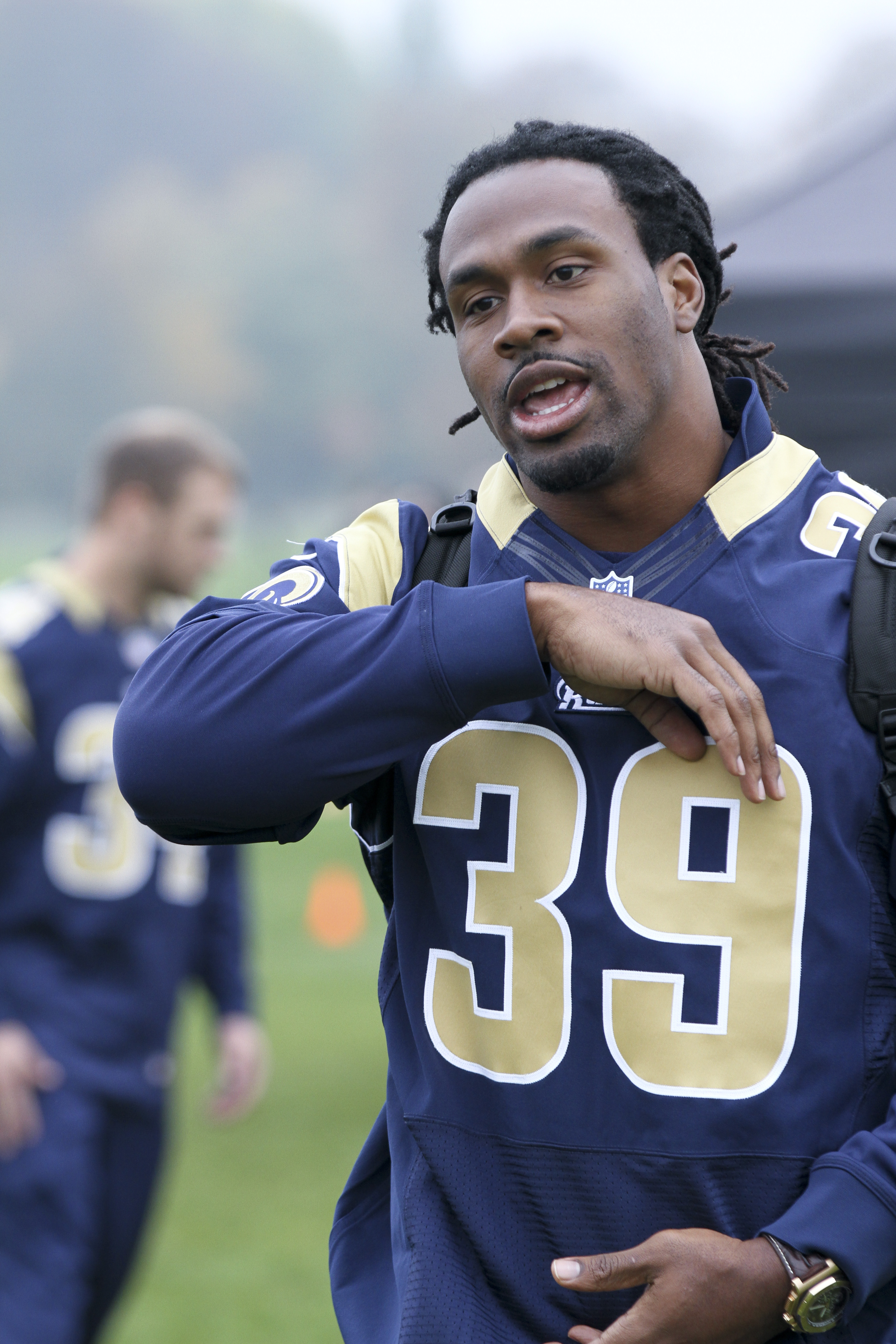
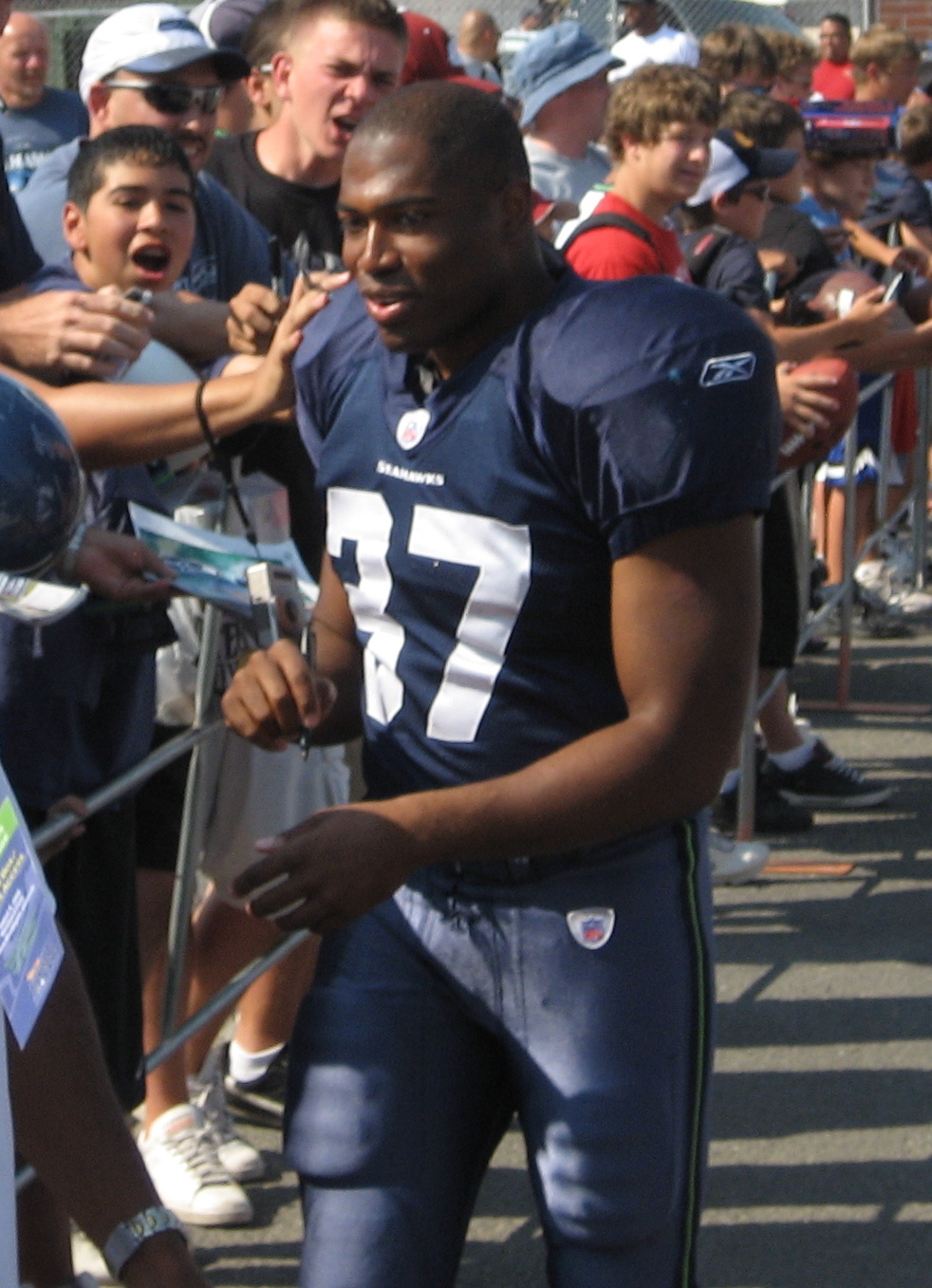
The Rams' Steven Jackson and the Seahawks' Shaun Alexander both combined for six Pro-Bowl appearances during the mid 2000s.

"Look at them Seahawks, Hey! They hate us? They hate us? Fuck 'em! We hate 'em too!"

— Chris Long, former Rams defensive end

Despite the sharp decline in competition from the Rams through the earlier half of the decade, moments of animosity between the two teams would still occur during the Rams' final years in St. Louis even whilst Seattle managed to become a Super Bowl contender and even earned a victory at Super Bowl XLVIII. Prior to the 2010 season, the Seahawks would hire Pete Carroll, who would be Seattle's head coach for the next 14 seasons and build his famous "Legion of Boom" defense. Both teams faced off in the final week of the season for the NFC West title despite both having losing records. The Seahawks would prevail, becoming the first 7–9 team in NFL history to win a division title and have a playoff berth.

Jeff Fisher would join the Rams as head coach for the 2012 season. Particularly against the Seahawks, Fisher would be known to use trick plays to bring his team to win. During a 2013 game in St. Louis, Seahawks receiver Golden Tate taunted Rams cornerback Janoris Jenkins by waving at him following a failed interception on the pass, whilst Tate returned the ball for a touchdown.

During the 2014 season, the Rams hosted the Seahawks for a week 7 matchup. Prior to halftime; the Rams had managed to lead the game 14–3. Star returner Tavon Austin was the designated punt return man on a play in which he acted as if he was calling for a fair catch, but the ball had actually been punted to the opposite side of the field, where Rams alternate returner Stedman Bailey was preparing to return the punt. With the entire Seattle coverage team focused on Austin, Bailey was left with a wide-open field and returned the punt 90 yards for a touchdown; culminating in the Rams winning 28–26 in an upset victory. The two teams later met for the season finale in week 17 in Seattle. The Rams' offense struggled mightily as they managed two field goals prior to halftime, though their defense capitalized on an interception from Russell Wilson and a recovered fumble lost by Seahawks' running back Marshawn Lynch during their possession. The Seahawks managed two field goals of their own into the end of the third quarter as neither team's offense managed to gain any momentum. During the start of the fourth quarter, Rams' quarterback Shaun Hill threw a critical interception; giving the Seahawks the ball on the 26 yard line as Lynch later retaliated with an unstoppable touchdown run. The Rams' hopes for a comeback were later crushed as Hill threw another interception to Seahawks' linebacker Bruce Irvin who returned the ball for a touchdown; all but sealing the victory for Seattle, giving them the highest seed in the NFC.

In 2015, Rams punter Johnny Hekker shoved Seahawks defensive end Cliff Avril following a 45-yard punt. Seahawks lineman Michael Bennett later attempted to tackle Hekker for retaliation, and would later refer to Hekker as "acting like a little girl" in the postgame interview. Following the Rams' victory in Seattle during week 16, Bennett would also take shots at Rams star rookie running back Todd Gurley on Twitter, after Gurley was awarded 2015 Offensive Rookie of the Year claiming, "he's average to me, personally. I've seen better running backs."

=== 2016–2019: Rams move to Los Angeles and hire Sean McVay ===
In 2016, the Rams returned to Los Angeles and began playing at the Los Angeles Memorial Coliseum as SoFi Stadium would be completed in 2020. The first regular season game back in Los Angeles was set against the Seahawks. The game opened with an impromptu concert for those in attendance by the Red Hot Chili Peppers to celebrate the return. Despite a strong showing from Seattle's passing game, they were ultimately unable to achieve a touchdown throughout the game. Meanwhile, the Rams endured similar issues with their quarterback rotation as Case Keenum struggled to stay consistent. The Rams also failed to score any touchdowns; they did, however, manage 3 field goals by Greg Zuerlein. The Rams' stellar defense managed to be the difference-maker within the game as Russell Wilson was sacked 4 times resulting in the Rams winning 9–3. However, the teams headed in opposite directions going forward, the Rams would collapse quickly following the win while the Seahawks managed to stay competitive. Fisher would be fired as Rams head coach 3 days before playing the Seahawks again that season. While Fisher never won more than seven games in each of his five seasons with the Rams, he still had a 5–4 record against Carroll's Seahawks while the two shared the same division. When the two teams met again during week 15 the Seahawks pulled through with a crushing 24–3 victory over the Rams. The Seahawks would later go on to win the division with a 10–5–1 record while the Rams finished 4–12.

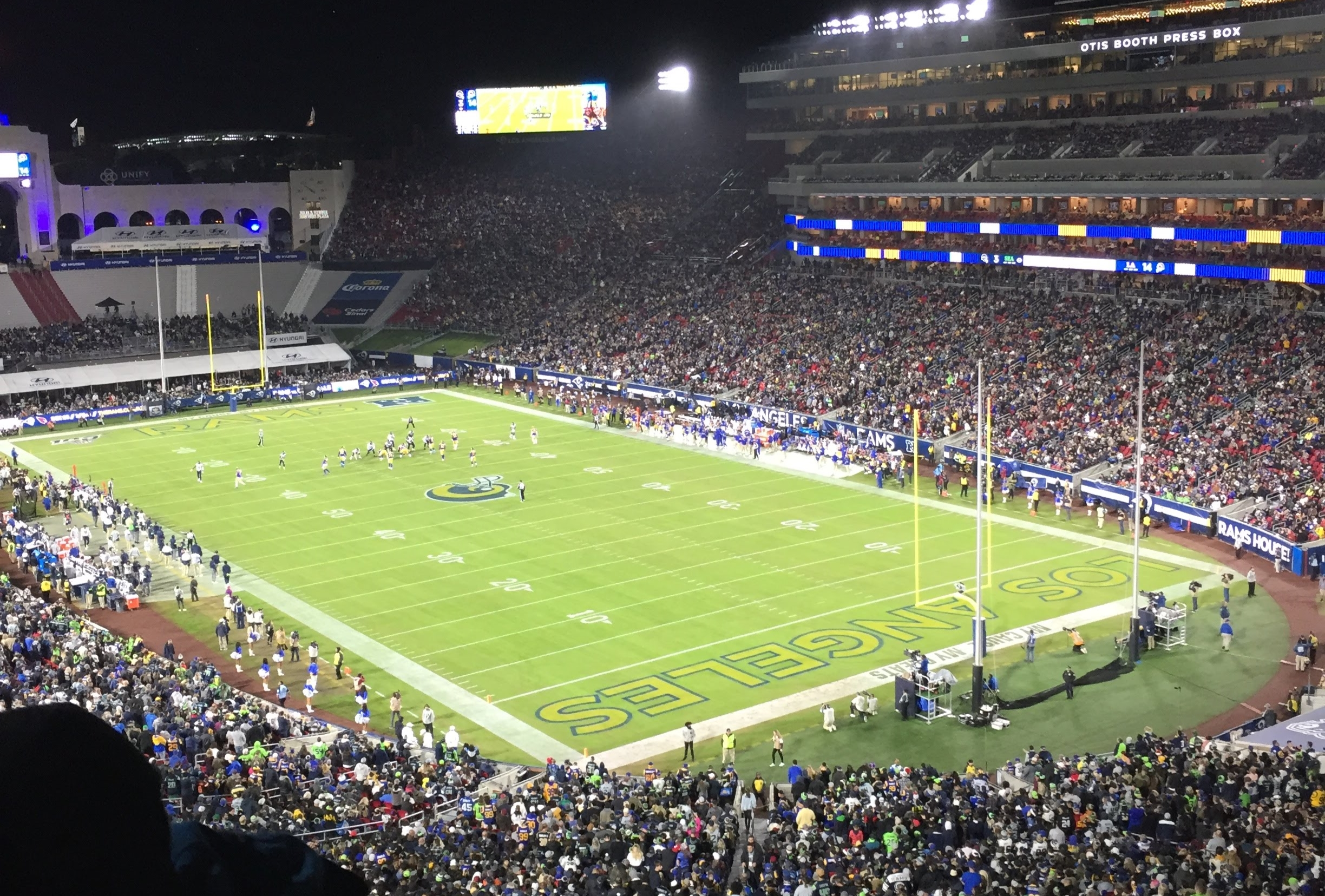
The Seahawks play the Rams at the Los Angeles Memorial Coliseum, December 8, 2019

The following season, the Rams hired Sean McVay as head coach. McVay's first game against the Seahawks saw the team put up a decent fight through the first half, but surrendered 2 field goals and a fumble as running back Todd Gurley's run into the endzone was ruled a touchback as he allegedly lost control of the ball. Seattle managed to win 16–10. The two teams met again during week 15 at CenturyLink Field with the Rams one game ahead of Seattle for the division lead. The Rams offense entered the game seeking vengeance, Todd Gurley scythed through Seattle's defense, putting up 152 rushing yards and 3 touchdowns as the Rams obliterated the Seahawks 42–7 for Seattle's worst home loss in franchise history. Aaron Donald finished the game with 3 sacks on Russell Wilson, while Wilson would only manage a single touchdown, completing only 14 of his 30 passes that game. Seattle's defense collapsed with relative ease as Rams' quarterback Jared Goff threw for 120 yards and 2 more touchdowns for good measure. The Rams achieved a playoff berth following their win over the division despite losing to the 49ers during the week 17 home game. Seattle would be tied with the Carolina Panthers for the lowest remaining wild card spot but would find themselves eliminated following their loss to the Arizona Cardinals the same week.

Starting the 2018 season, the two teams met in Seattle during week 5. Early on in the game, tensions began to run high after an early scuffle led to both benches clearing after Rams wide receiver Brandin Cooks suffered an injury resulting from a controversial head-on collision from Seahawks safety Tedric Thompson, though no penalty was given to Seattle. The Rams held on, not to the same intensity as the season prior, but managed to pull off the victory nonetheless with a final score of 36–31. During the week 10 game in Los Angeles, Rams defensive tackle Aaron Donald managed a strip sack of Russell Wilson during the 3rd quarter and managed to recover the ball as he ran out of bounds. Prior to going off the field, Seahawks center Justin Britt threw Donald to the ground, prompting a retaliatory punch from Donald after Britt had also thrown a punch at Rams cornerback Nickell Robey-Coleman. The altercation escalated quickly into a full scale brawl as Seahawks offensive lineman J.R. Sweezy and Rams cornerback Troy Hill also began throwing punches at one another. Seahawks’ lineman Austin Calitro and Rams’ Defensive End Ethan Westbrooks had to be separated by officials after also engaging into a separate fight. Both benches would continue to clear until Sean McVay, Zac Taylor, Doug Baldwin, Jordan Simmons, and Michael Brockers intervened on both sides to mollify the altercation. Following the Rams' 33–31 victory, another large altercation took place at midfield following the game between multiple players as Donald and Britt continued to antagonize one another, erupting into another brawl as both benches cleared. Donald and Britt would each receive a $20,000 fine from the league for the altercation. The Rams would go on to complete their first season sweep of the Seahawks since 2015, en route to a 13–3 record and a Super Bowl LIII appearance. Seattle managed to finish the season as division runners-up with their 10–6 record, managing a Wild Card berth against the Dallas Cowboys, though they would go on to lose 22–24.

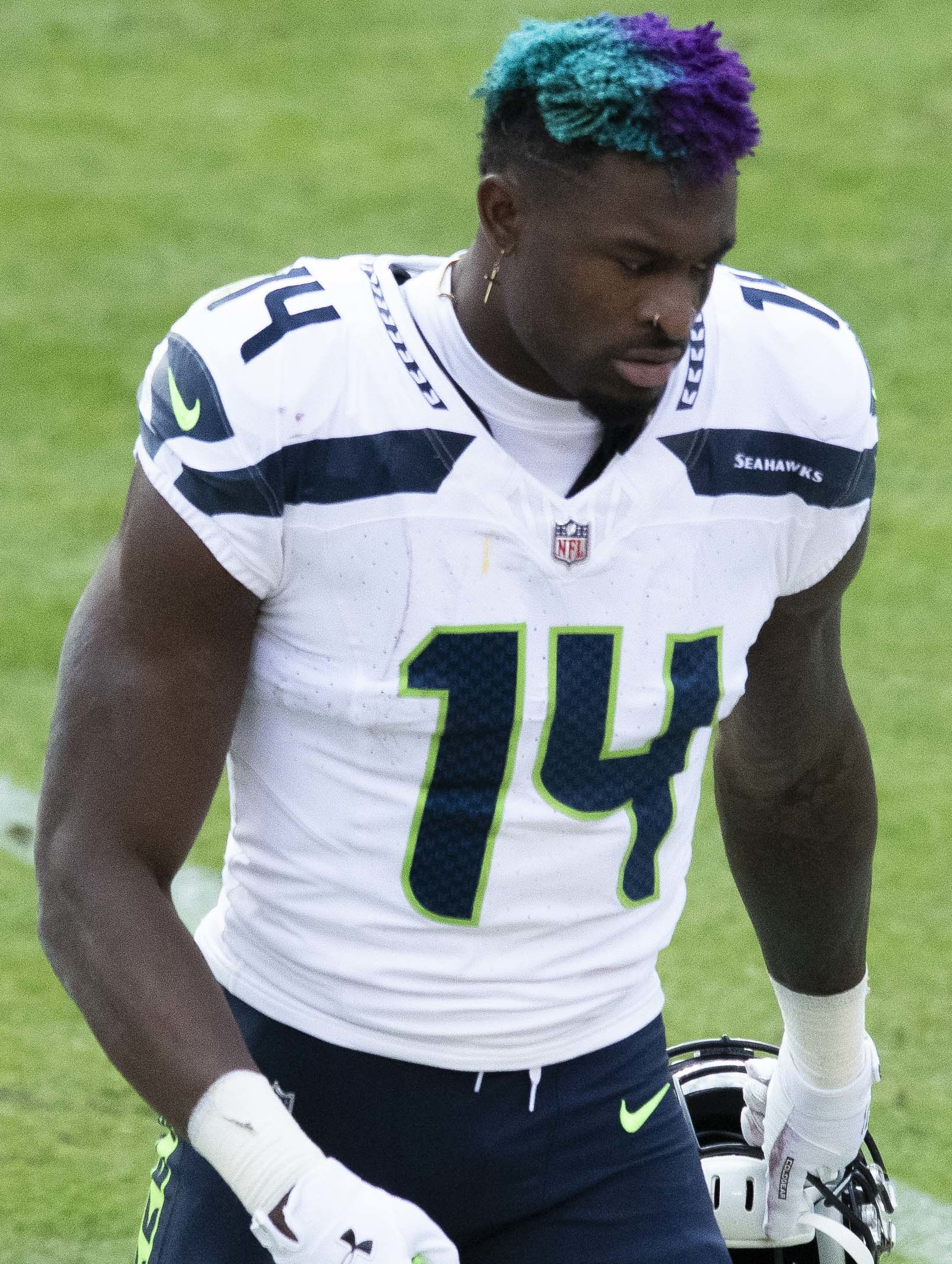
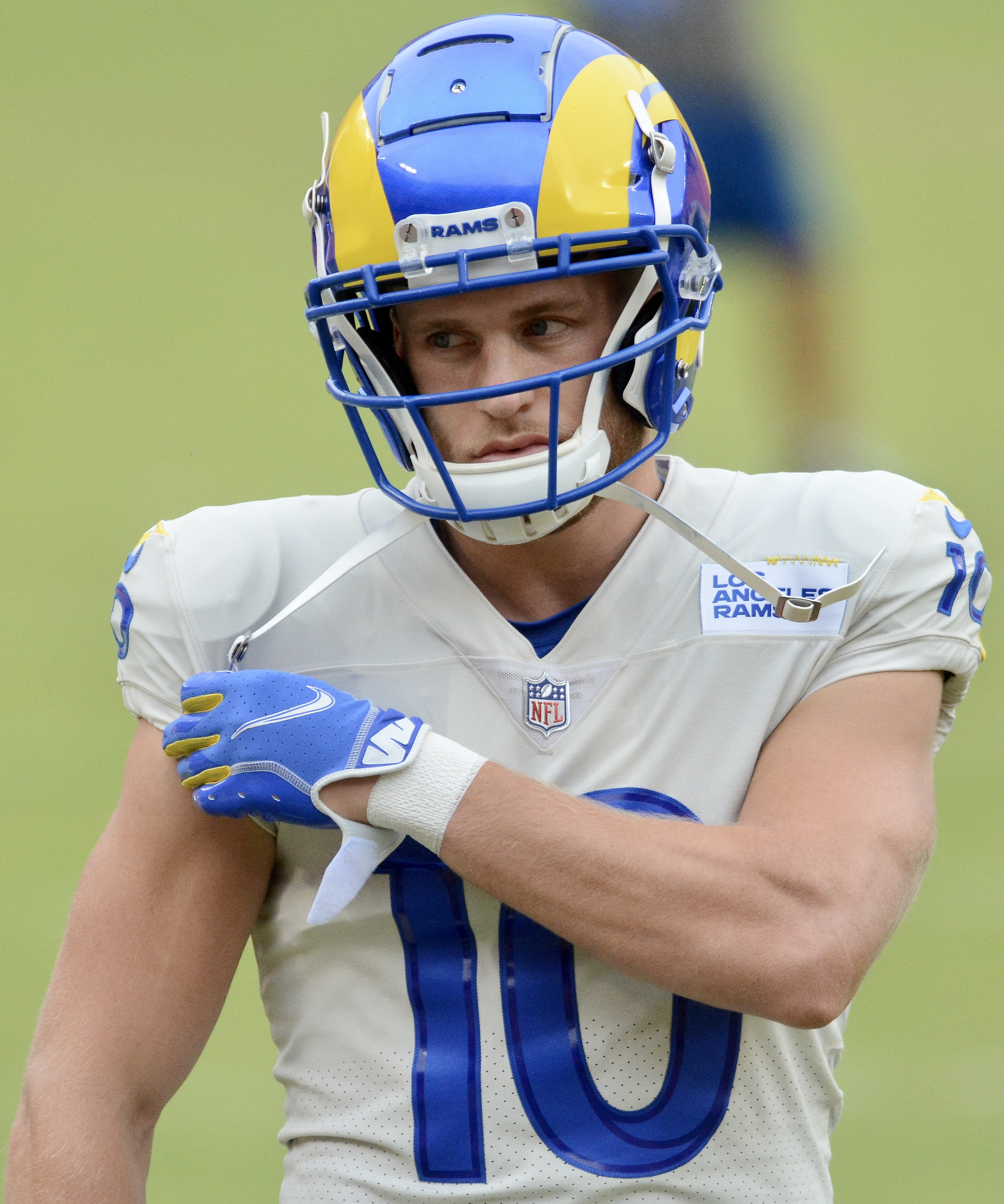
Former Seahawk DK Metcalf and Ram Cooper Kupp emerged as dynamic receivers during their tenures with their respective teams.

The 2019 season would reverse fortunes for both teams as the Rams encountered a slump following their Super Bowl loss while the San Francisco 49ers ran away with the division. The two teams met for a Thursday night matchup in Seattle during week 5. The Seahawks managed to deal some damage with their new rookie wide receiver DK Metcalf combined with veteran Tyler Lockett managing a shared 91 receiving yards to boost Seattle through the game. Russell Wilson returned to form with a 4-touchdown performance while Jared Goff managed a lone touchdown and a controversial interception from Tedric Thompson as multiple players on both sides claimed the ball had hit the ground prior to Thompson's grab. Following a challenge from Pete Carroll after the officials ruled the ball an incomplete pass, Seattle was awarded possession after 15 minutes of review. The Rams managed a 9-point comeback through the 4th quarter, but a devastating missed field goal from Greg Zuerlein gave Seattle the victory, 30–29. The Rams would continue to struggle mightily through their Super Bowl Slump as quarterback Jared Goff would begin to exhibit declining play as opposing defenses managed to interrupt the Rams' passing scheme. Entering the week 14 matchup at the LA Coliseum, the Seahawks boasted a 10–2 record while the Rams entered the game with a less impressive 7–5 record. Despite the differences in seasons, the Rams managed to put up more of a fight than they had during the previous matchup as they would end the first half up 21–3. During the 2nd quarter, Rams cornerback Jalen Ramsey and DK Metcalf engaged in an altercation following Ramsey breaking up three pass attempts intended for Metcalf. Despite Metcalf's best efforts, Seattle struggled mightily through the game. Seattle scored a pick-6 from newly signed safety Quandre Diggs, but the Rams defense bullied the Seahawks the entire game, managing to sack Russell Wilson 5 times on top of a fumble and an interception. Seattle was now out of the hunt for the division lead as the 49ers would manage to win the division. The Rams finished 2019 with a 9–7 record, missing the playoffs due to a sweep from the 49ers; Seattle managed to secure a wild card victory over the Philadelphia Eagles though they would go on to lose against the Green Bay Packers during the divisional round.

=== 2020–2024: Rams win Super Bowl LVI, Carroll departs Seattle ===
The 2020 season started off with the Rams winning the first of the two matchups that year at home in a hard-fought week 10 defeat of the Seahawks 23–16. Seattle entered the matchup 6–2, Los Angeles entered at 5–3. The Rams got to an early lead as Wilson threw two interceptions while Alex Collins gave the Seahawks their only touchdown of the game. However, the second matchup ignited tensions between the two clubs. Seattle was a game ahead of the Rams in the hunt for the division lead as the Rams had lost two critical upsets to the New York Jets and the San Francisco 49ers. The Rams struggled offensively through the entire game as Jared Goff struggled and threw no touchdowns and a critical interception as they lost, 20–9. Seahawks safety Jamal Adams celebrated during a press conference by lighting a cigar and taunting various people on the Rams and declaring "it feels good don’t it Rams?" to the cameras. The Seahawks went on to win the NFC West with a record of 12–4; meanwhile, the Rams managed to clinch a wild card spot with a 10–6 record and the two teams were set to meet in the NFC Wild Card round in Seattle.

Leading up to that game, Seattle had not lost a home playoff game since losing to the Rams in 2004. The Rams had benched Goff prior to the game due to a fracture within his thumb and were forced to start backup quarterback John Wolford. In the first quarter, Jamal Adams landed an illegal low helmet-to-helmet hit on Wolford, knocking him out of the game. Goff was forced to play off the bench and led the Rams to a 30–20 victory over the Seahawks, ending their 10-game home playoff winning streak. Following the game, Rams cornerback Jalen Ramsey was seen on the field by cameras, celebrating and exclaiming the Seahawks should "they outta take their hat and their T-shirts down to Cabo for the rest of the off-season." Goff also voiced his initial satisfaction with the victory as he felt offended by Adams' cigar gesture.

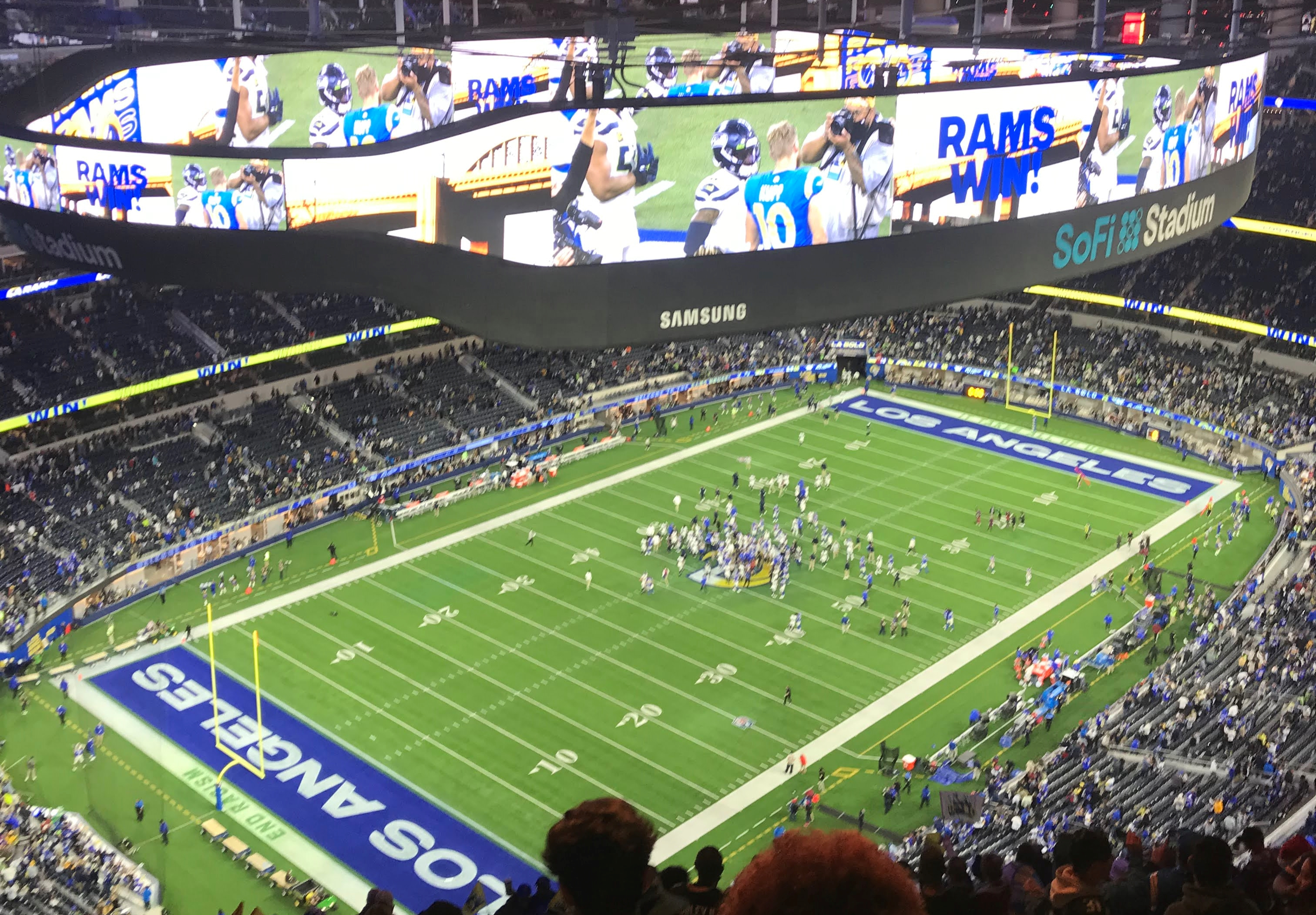
The Rams beat the Seahawks at SoFi Stadium, December 21, 2021

During the offseason, the Seahawks acquired former Rams tight end Gerald Everett in free agency and hired former Rams passing game coordinator Shane Waldron as their offensive coordinator. Meanwhile, the Rams traded Goff and several draft picks to the Detroit Lions in exchange for quarterback Matthew Stafford.

In week 5 of the 2021 season, the Rams trailed the Seahawks by four points at halftime. In the third quarter, the Rams' offense finally woke up and scored 13 unanswered points while their defense terrorized the Seahawks. During the quarter, the Rams' reigning Defensive Player of the Year, Aaron Donald, disrupted a Wilson pass for an incompletion. On this play, Wilson dislocated his finger when it hit Donald's hand, and as a result, Wilson was benched for the remainder of the game. Wilson's finger later put him on injured reserve, and the Seahawks were forced to play their backup quarterback Geno Smith. Smith threw one touchdown but also threw a critical interception with the Seahawks trailing by six late in the fourth quarter, giving the Rams the victory.

"I don't like the Rams, we'll see them when we see them"

— Jamal Adams, Seahawks safety

In Week 15 of that same season, a critical game between the rivals was postponed from Sunday, December 19 to Tuesday, December 21 due to COVID-19 outbreaks on both sides. With neither offense at full strength, the 9–4 Rams defeated the 5–8 Seahawks by the final score of 20–10 in a defensive battle. The Rams won thanks to two receiving touchdowns by eventual 2021 Offensive Player of the Year, 2021 receiving triple crown winner, and Super Bowl LVI MVP Cooper Kupp. The win allowed the Rams to keep pace with the Arizona Cardinals for the NFC West division title. Simultaneously for the Seahawks; the loss was effectively a death blow to Seattle's season. Seattle would be eliminated from playoff contention a week later. Meanwhile, the Rams finished with a 12–5 record, winning the NFC West, and eventually winning Super Bowl LVI. The Seahawks finished the season at last place in the division with a 7–10 record, their first losing record since 2011.

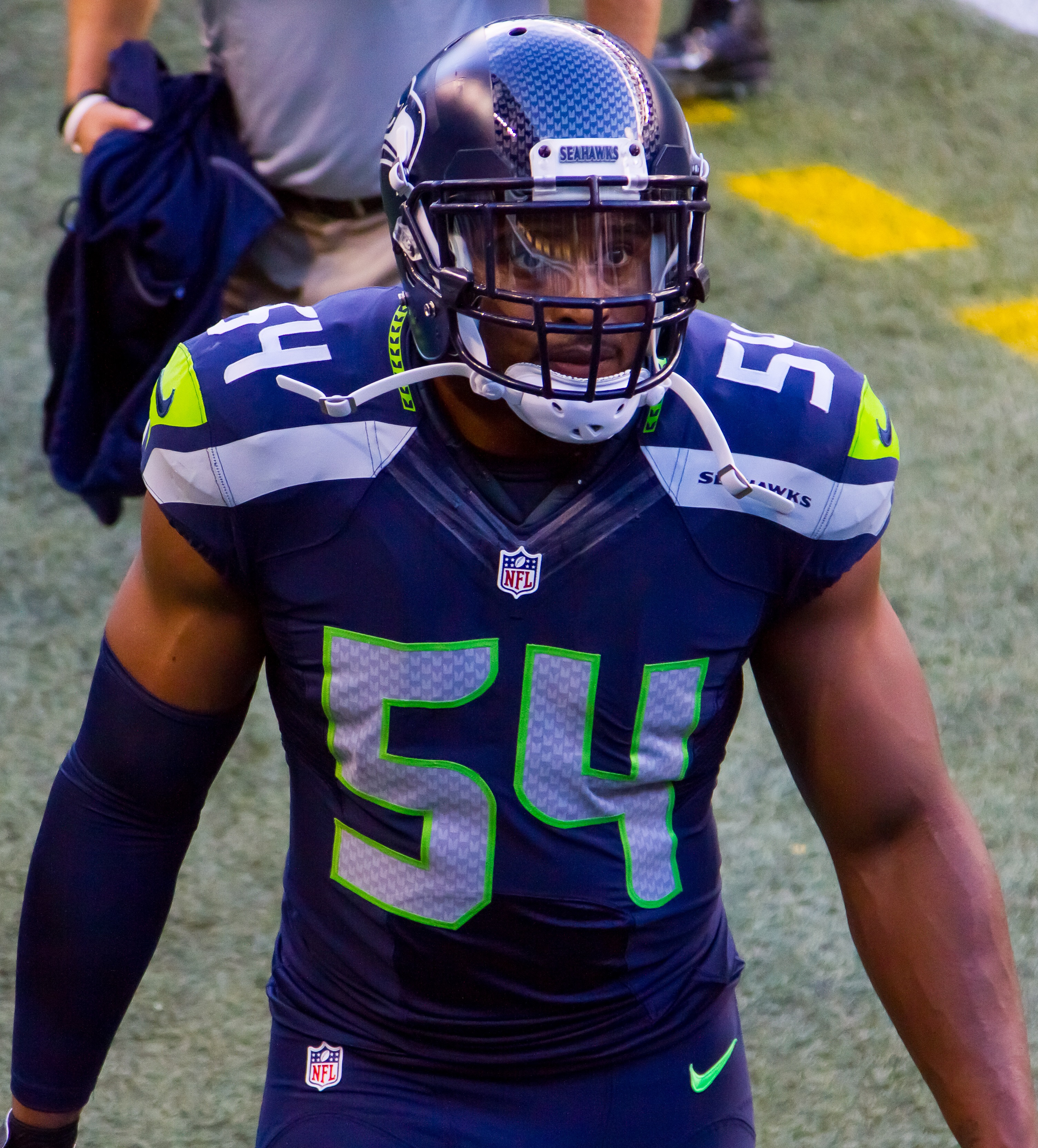
LB Bobby Wagner, a prominent member of the renowned "Legion of Boom" squad, signed with the Rams in the 2022 season. However, he was released the following season and soon returned to the Seahawks

During the 2022 off-season, Seattle traded longtime quarterback Russell Wilson to the Denver Broncos. Most notably during his time in Seattle, Rams star defensive tackle Aaron Donald had recorded 15 sacks against Seattle, more than any other opponent in Wilson's career. The Seahawks also made the decision to release Pro Bowl linebacker Bobby Wagner, the final remaining member of the "Legion of Boom" defense. Originally a native of Southern California, Wagner would ironically choose to sign with the Rams on March 31 for a 5-year contract worth up to $65 million.

In Week 13 of the 2022 season, the two teams met at SoFi Stadium. The Rams' dreams of defending their Super Bowl title fell apart as the team had fallen victim to a plethora of injuries, including injuries to key contributors Matthew Stafford, Cooper Kupp, and Aaron Donald. During the game, the Rams' weakened offense and defense held their own. However, Seattle won 27–23 on a last-minute touchdown pass from Smith to star wide receiver DK Metcalf for the franchise's first victory in Los Angeles since 2017. The win allowed the Seahawks to keep pace in the NFC Wild Card race.

In the final week of the season, the eliminated and injury plagued Rams limped into Seattle with a 5–11 record, while the Seahawks entered the contest with an 8–8 record. Seattle needed a win and a Green Bay Packers loss or tie to make the playoffs. The Rams could have theoretically knocked the Seahawks out of the postseason with a victory, but the Seahawks beat them again, this time by a final score of 19–16, on a game-ending field goal in overtime by Seattle kicker Jason Myers. The victory was especially controversial, as many fans, coaches, and NFL executives pointed out that several questionable calls late in the game helped the Seahawks win and thus maintain their playoff hopes. Meanwhile, the calls directly hurt the Rams and indirectly hurt the Detroit Lions, who needed Seattle to lose in order to maintain their own playoff hopes. One anonymous source called the game "the worst officiated game of the year." Because the Lions defeated the Packers hours later, the Seahawks secured a wild card berth, but they would lose the NFC Wild Card game to the division champion San Francisco 49ers.

On September 2, 2023; the Seahawks signed former Rams' cornerback Robert Rochell to their roster.

The two teams met for the opening week of the 2023 season in Seattle. The Seahawks were heavy favorites to win the matchup as the Rams were coming off of an injury-plagued 5-win season the year before. Adding to the Rams' issues was star-receiver Cooper Kupp being ruled out of the game with a hamstring injury. Seahawks' receiver DK Metcalf made his hostility present as he taunted Rams' cornerback Derion Kendrick prior to his lone touchdown catch, and later dealt an illegal hit on Rams' cornerback Ahkello Witherspoon after the previous play; angering Sean McVay on the sidelines, though Metcalf would later be fined for taunting. Despite an early showing from Seattle in the first quarter which saw them leading 13–7 by the half; Geno Smith played particularly poorly through the game, only throwing for 117 yards while Matthew Stafford threw for 334. Rams' rookie receiver Puka Nacua dominated the Seahawks' secondary, making 10 catches for 119 yards in his debut. Rams' running backs Kyren Williams and Cam Akers managed to combine for 81 yards and three touchdowns, all but securing the victory by the third quarter after Brett Maher managed to complete three field goals. Following the game, Rams' cornerback Derion Kendrick made a further attack on Metcalf in a post, calling out his taunts during the catch.

The Rams later hosted the Seahawks for their week 11 matchup in Los Angeles. Seattle entered the game boasting a 6–3 record while the Rams struggled mightily as they limped into the game following 3 straight losses. Despite a lone touchdown to start the game; the Seahawks' offense became increasingly overwhelmed by the Rams' defense as they only managed two additional field goals to end the first half. Nearing the end of the third quarter; Geno Smith suffered a brutal tackle from Aaron Donald, that injured his elbow, forcing Seattle to play Drew Lock who played very poorly. Both sides continued to grow increasingly hostile with each other after a violent Suplex tackle on Rams' wide receiver Austin Trammell from Seahawks' rookie cornerback Devon Witherspoon. The Rams' steadily cut the lead down to 2 points headed into the end of the fourth quarter, even managing a critical interception thrown by Lock. The Rams later took the lead by 1 point following a field goal, prompting Smith to return to the game for a possible drive despite his injured elbow. Desperate to regain the lead, the Seahawks managed two first down conversions to set up Jason Myers for a 55-yard field goal; desperate to retake the lead. Following a brief timeout from Sean McVay in an effort to ice Seattle's kicker; Myers later missed the field goal as it sailed wide-right; ending the game in a crushing fashion as the Rams managed to sweep the Seahawks for the first time since 2021.

Los Angeles finished the 2023 season with a 10–7 record and the sixth seed in the NFC playoffs, while Seattle finished with a 9–8 record and finished tied with the Green Bay Packers for the seventh seed. However, Green Bay eventually took the final playoff spot on the strength of victory tiebreaker. Seattle's season was largely viewed as a collapse as they boasted a 6–3 record until their matchup against the Rams. Had Seattle won just one of its two games against the Rams, Seattle would have made the playoffs instead of Los Angeles.

Following the conclusion of the 2023 season; the Seahawks announced the departure of longtime head coach Pete Carroll after 14 seasons, as he would be assigned to an administrative role within the organization. Following the announcement, Rams head coach Sean McVay later expressed respect for Carroll despite the rivalry; describing him as "the ultimate competitor". From 2017 to 2023; Sean McVay remained the only active head coach to boast a winning record against Carroll, going 10–5 against the Seahawks during that span. Seattle later announced the hiring of former Ravens defensive coordinator Mike Macdonald as their new head coach. Los Angeles would later sign former Seahawks tight end Colby Parkinson during the offseason. Rams stalwart defensive tackle Aaron Donald later announced his retirement on March 15, 2024. Both teams had reportedly found themselves involved in a bidding war that offseason involving backup quarterback Sam Howell, though he eventually signed in an offer from the Seahawks.

Tensions escalated during the week 9 matchup between the two teams on November 3, 2024. During the 2nd quarter; Rams' star wide receiver Puka Nacua was ejected from the game for throwing a punch at Seahawks' linebacker Tyrel Dodson in retaliation after Dodson shoved Nacua to the ground during the previous play. The game saw an escalating battle in competition as Geno Smith turned the ball over 3 times before leading the Seahawks to a last second touchdown to lead the game into overtime. Despite this; the Rams won the game on a walk-off touchdown from receiver Demarcus Robinson.

=== 2025–present: Increased competitiveness, Seahawks win Super Bowl LX ===
During the 2025 offseason, longtime Rams' wide receiver Cooper Kupp signed with the Seahawks. The signing occurred several days after the Seahawks would lose Tyler Lockett, DK Metcalf, and quarterback Geno Smith on the roster. Lockett was released after the season on March 5, 2025, ending his ten-year stint with the team, while Smith and Metcalf were both traded eight days later to the Raiders and Steelers, respectively.

During the 2025 season, both the Rams and Seahawks broke out as two of the best teams in the conference; with both boasting a 7–2 record prior to their week 11 matchup in Los Angeles on November 16. The Rams emerged victorious in the narrow 21–19 victory; Darnold was intercepted four times, and Myers missed a potential game-winning field goal for the Seahawks as time expired. This ended the Seahawks' 10-game road winning streak. Both teams matched up in Seattle once again with the 1-seed on the line for both as the Rams had previously clinched a playoff berth the prior week. However, the Rams' lead over the conference and the division began to lose ground following an upset loss to the Carolina Panthers three weeks prior. The game proved to be a heated matchup on both offense and defense. The Rams jumped out to a 30–14 lead, but the Seahawks managed an improbable comeback, forcing the game into overtime following a controversial ruling in which the Seahawks appeared to have an unsuccessful 2-point conversion, but the officiating crews ruled it a lateral pass despite the ball failing to enter the endzone in possession of any Seahawks receivers. Despite this, the Seahawks won the game on another crushing 2-point conversion in overtime after the Rams had scored on their first possession, stealing the lead of the division and the conference in the process. McVay would openly question the controversial two-point play in the post-game press conference saying, "Very interesting. Didn't get a clear explanation of everything that went on just because of some of the timing of it. I've never seen anything or never been a part of anything like that. And I've grown up around this game. I'm not making excuses. We don't do that. I don't believe in that. It doesn't move us forward, but we do want clarity and an understanding of the things that we can do to minimize that when we rejected the two-point conversion." Following the game, Puka Nacua made a now-deleted Twitter post reading, "Can you say i was wrong. Appreciate you stripes for your contribution. Lol." He was fined $25,000 by the NFL for his comments.

The Seahawks ultimately secured a 1st-round bye, on top of a blowout victory against the 49ers in the divisional round. The Rams also managed two victories against both the Carolina Panthers and the Chicago Bears en route to a third matchup against the Seahawks in Seattle for the NFC Championship. The game was notable for a taunting penalty called against Seahawks cornerback Riq Woolen after he exchanged words with the Rams bench, which ended up putting the Rams in range to score, which they would do on the next play. The Seahawks ultimately prevailed in another close match-up, winning 31–27 to advance to Super Bowl LX, which they would win against the New England Patriots.

Following the season, the Rams requested two changes to the NFL rulebook which were thought to be in response to Charbonet's two-point play during their Week 16 matchup. The first proposed change would be that a backward pass that is tipped by a defensive player and goes past the line of scrimmage would be treated like a fumble, and the second would be to limit the time for the initiation of a replay review, capping it at either 40 seconds or a minute. However, the Rams would ultimately withdraw both proposals before the NFL's annual team meeting, citing the randomness of the Charbonet play and the unlikeliness to get the number of votes needed for the rules to pass. During the annual team meeting, McVay would jokingly interrupt one of Macdonald's press conferences by asking Macdonald what he thought of the two-point play, to which Macdonald would respond "that's still on the table?"

== Season-by-season results ==
St. Louis/Los Angeles Rams vs. Seattle Seahawks Season-by-Season Results
1970s–1990s (Rams, 4–2)

Season	Results	Location	Overall series	Notes
1976	Rams; 45–6	Los Angeles Memorial Coliseum	Rams; 1–0	The Seahawks join the NFL as an expansion team. They are placed in the National Football Conference (NFC) and the NFC West. The following season, they were moved to the American Football Conference (AFC) and the AFC West, where they remained through the 2001 season. Rams record their largest victory against the Seahawks with a 39-point differential and score their most points in a game against the Seahawks. Only meeting played at the Los Angeles Memorial Coliseum until the 2016 season.
1979	Rams; 24–0	Kingdome	Rams; 2–0	The Seahawks finish with −7 total yards, setting an NFL record for the fewest total yards in a game. Rams lose Super Bowl XIV.
1985	Rams; 35–24	Kingdome	Rams; 3–0	
1988	Rams; 31–10	Anaheim Stadium	Rams; 4–0	First and only meeting played at Anaheim Stadium.
1991	Seahawks; 23–9	Kingdome	Rams; 4–1	The final game played at Kingdome. This was the last season until the 2016 season the Seahawks faced the Rams as a Los Angeles-based team, as they relocated to St. Louis in the 1995 season.
1997	Seahawks; 17–9	Trans World Dome	Rams; 4–2	First matchup in St. Louis.

2000s (Seahawks, 12–6)

Season	Season series	at St. Louis Rams	at Seattle Seahawks	Overall series	Notes
2000	Rams 1–0	—N/a	Rams; 37–34	Rams; 5–2	Seahawks temporarily play at Husky Stadium.
2002	Tie 1–1	Rams; 37–20	Seahawks; 30–10	Rams; 6–3	During the NFL realignment, the Seahawks are moved back to the NFC West, resulting in two meetings annually. Seahawks open Seahawks Stadium (now known as Lumen Field).
2003	Tie 1–1	Rams; 27–22	Seahawks; 24–23	Rams; 7–4	In Seattle, Seahawks overcame a 23–10 fourth-quarter deficit.
2004	Rams 2–0	Rams; 23–12	Rams; 33–27 (OT)	Rams; 9–4	In Seattle, Rams overcame a 27–10 fourth-quarter deficit.
2004 Playoffs	Rams 1–0	—N/a	Rams; 27–20	Rams; 10–4	NFC Wild Card Round.
2005	Seahawks 2–0	Seahawks; 37–31	Seahawks; 31–16	Rams; 10–6	Seahawks lose Super Bowl XL.
2006	Seahawks 2–0	Seahawks; 30–28	Seahawks; 24–22	Rams; 10–8	
2007	Seahawks 2–0	Seahawks; 24–19	Seahawks; 33–6	Tie; 10–10	
2008	Seahawks 2–0	Seahawks; 23–20	Seahawks; 37–13	Seahawks; 12–10	
2009	Seahawks 2–0	Seahawks; 27–17	Seahawks; 28–0	Seahawks; 14–10	In Seattle, Seahawks record their largest victory against the Rams with a 28-point differential. Seahawks win 10 straight meetings (2005–2009).

2010s (Tie 10–10)

Season	Season series	at St. Louis/Los Angeles Rams	at Seattle Seahawks	Overall series	Notes
2010	Tie 1–1	Rams; 20–3	Seahawks; 16–6	Seahawks; 15–11	The Seahawks clinched the NFC West and eliminated the Rams from playoff contention with their win. Seahawks become the first team to clinch a playoff berth with a losing record since the 1982 season.
2011	Seahawks 2–0	Seahawks; 24–7	Seahawks; 30–13	Seahawks; 17–11	
2012	Tie 1–1	Rams; 19–13	Seahawks; 20–13	Seahawks; 18–12	Seahawks draft Russell Wilson.
2013	Seahawks 2–0	Seahawks; 14–9	Seahawks; 27–9	Seahawks; 20–12	Seahawks win Super Bowl XLVIII.
2014	Tie 1–1	Rams; 28–26	Seahawks; 20–6	Seahawks; 21–13	The Seahawks win 10 straight home meetings (2005–2014). Seahawks lose Super Bowl XLIX.
2015	Rams 2–0	Rams; 34–31 (OT)	Rams; 23–17	Seahawks; 21–15	Rams' first road win and season series sweep against the Seahawks since the 2004 season. It was the final season Rams played as a St. Louis-based team.
2016	Tie 1–1	Rams; 9–3	Seahawks; 24–3	Seahawks; 22–16	Rams relocate back to Los Angeles.
2017	Tie 1–1	Seahawks; 16–10	Rams; 42–7	Seahawks; 23–17	Rams hire Sean McVay as head coach.
2018	Rams 2–0	Rams; 36–31	Rams; 33–31	Seahawks; 23–19	Rams sweep the NFC West for the first time since the 1999 season. Rams lose Super Bowl LIII.
2019	Tie 1–1	Rams; 28–12	Seahawks; 30–29	Seahawks; 24–20	Last meeting played at Los Angeles Memorial Coliseum.

2020s (Rams, 8–6)

Season	Season series	at Los Angeles Rams	at Seattle Seahawks	Overall series	Notes
2020	Tie 1–1	Rams; 23–16	Seahawks; 20–9	Seahawks; 25–21	Rams open SoFi Stadium.
2020 Playoffs	Rams 1–0	—N/a	Rams; 30–20	Seahawks; 25–22	NFC Wild Card Round.
2021	Rams 2–0	Rams; 20–10	Rams; 26–17	Seahawks; 25–24	Rams trade QB Jared Goff for QB Matthew Stafford. Last start in the series for Seahawks' QB Russell Wilson. Rams win Super Bowl LVI.
2022	Seahawks 2–0	Seahawks; 27–23	Seahawks; 19–16 (OT)	Seahawks; 27–24	Rams sign former Seahawks' LB Bobby Wagner. In Los Angeles, the Rams were guaranteed to become the first defending Super Bowl champion to finish with a losing record since the 2003 Buccaneers with their loss. In Seattle, the Rams set an NFL record by finishing with the worst winning percentage for any defending NFL or AFL champion with their loss.
2023	Rams 2–0	Rams; 17–16	Rams; 30–13	Seahawks; 27–26	Seahawks resign LB Bobby Wagner. It was the final season for Seahawks' HC Pete Carroll and Rams' DT Aaron Donald.
2024	Tie 1–1	Seahawks; 30–25	Rams; 26–20 (OT)	Seahawks; 28–27	Both teams finished with 10–7 records, but the Rams clinched the NFC West based on the strength of victory tiebreaker, eliminating the Seahawks from playoff contention.
2025	Tie 1–1	Rams; 21–19	Seahawks; 38–37 (OT)	Seahawks; 29–28	Seahawks sign former Rams WR and Super Bowl LVI MVP Cooper Kupp. Rams' win ended the Seahawks' 10-game road winning streak. In Seattle, the Seahawks overcame a 30–14 fourth-quarter deficit with eight minutes remaining and won in overtime. With the victory, Seattle clinched a playoff berth and became the first team to win an overtime game after its opponent scored a touchdown on the opening possession, under the revised overtime rules allowing both teams a possession. Additionally, Seahawks score their most points in a game against the Rams.
2025 Playoffs	Seahawks 1–0	—N/a	Seahawks; 31–27	Seahawks; 30–28	NFC Championship Game. Seahawks win Super Bowl LX.
2026		January 9/10	December 25	Seahawks; 30–28	Game in Seattle will be played on Christmas Day.

Summary of results

Season	Season series	at St. Louis/Los Angeles Rams	at Seattle Seahawks	Notes
Regular season	Seahawks 29–26	Rams 16–11	Seahawks 18–10	
Postseason	Rams 2–1	No games	Rams 2–1	NFC Wild Card: 2004, 2020; NFC Championship: 2025
Regular and postseason	Seahawks 30–28	Rams 16–11	Seahawks 19–12	Seahawks have an 8–7 record in St. Louis. Rams currently have an 9–3 record in Los Angeles.

== Notable fan moments ==
- During the Rams' first regular season game after returning to Los Angeles on September 16, 2016; numerous fights broke out at the LA Coliseum during their matchup against the Seahawks. No police reports were filed but phone video recorded an altercation between a Rams fan and a Seahawks fan. While walking up the stadium's stairs; a Seahawks fan was punched by two Rams fans, knocking him back, unintentionally hitting a 9 year old Rams fan in attendance
- Red Hot Chili Peppers drummer Chad Smith (who is a Rams fan) made an appearance with the Seahawks' "Blue Thunder" drum line in November 2021. In response, the Rams reiterated a long-running joke of Smith's resemblance to actor Will Ferrell (who is a Seahawks fan), Smith attended a game at SoFi Stadium. The Rams social media team jokingly trolled Smith on the stadium jumbotron, displaying his picture next to Ferrell's.
- During an interview with Rich Eisen in May 2025, Rams' General Manager Les Snead revealed that Pete Carroll and the Seahawks organization had the Rams and their staff booked at a hotel hosting a Furry convention for several consecutive years whenever the Rams would travel to play the Seahawks in Seattle as a possible act of pranking.

== Connections between the teams ==
Name	Position(s)	Rams' tenure	Seahawks' tenure
Chuck Knox	Head coach	1973–1977, 1992–1994	1983–1991
Bobby Wagner	Middle linebacker	2022	2012–2021, 2023
Robert Rochell	Cornerback	2021–2022	2023
Colby Parkinson	Tight end	2024–2025	2020–2023, 2026
Cooper Kupp	Wide receiver	2017–2024	2025–present
Ernest Jones IV	Middle linebacker	2021–2023	2024–present
Art Valero	Assistant head coach/ offensive line coach	2008–2009	2010
Curt Warner	Running back	1990	1983–1989
Jeff Kemp	Quarterback	1981–1985	1987–1991
Gerald Everett	Tight end	2017–2020	2021
Poona Ford	Defensive tackle	2025–present	2018–2022
Derion Kendrick	Cornerback	2022–2024, 2025	2025
Nick Vannett	Tight end	2025	2016–2019
Tremayne Anchrum	Guard	2020–2023	2024
Cam Akers	Running back	2020–2023	2025
Lawrence McCutcheon	Running back	1972–1979	1980
Shane Waldron	Tight ends coach/ offensive coordinator	2017–2020	2021–2023
Cullen Bryant	Running back	1973–1982	1983–1984
Wayne Hunter	Offensive tackle	2012	2003–05
Ricky Proehl	Tight end	1998–2002	1995–1996
Jeff Robinson	Tight end	1997–2001, 2005	2007–2009
Maurice Alexander	Safety	2014–2017	2018
Johnnie Johnson	Defensive back	1980–1988	1989
Austin Davis	Quarterback	2012, 2013–2014	2017
Charle Young	Tight end	1977–1979	1983–1985
Chase Reynolds	Running back/special teamer	2011–2016	2011
Ronnie Rivers	Running back	2022–present	2022
Donnie Jones	Punter	2007–2011	2004
Bryce Fisher	Defensive end	2002–2004	2005–2007
Isaiah Battle	Offensive tackle	2015–2016	2017
Jerry Rhome	Offensive coordinator	1997–1998	1976–1982
Jack Patera	Head coach/ defensive line coach	1963–1967	1976–1982
Rick Tuten	Punter	1998–1999	1991–1997
Mark Rypien	Quarterback	1995, 1997	2002
Joe Vitt	Linebackers coach	1992–1994, 2004–2005	1982–1991

== See also ==
- List of NFL rivalries
- NFC West
