= 49er Faithful =

Fans of the San Francisco 49ers

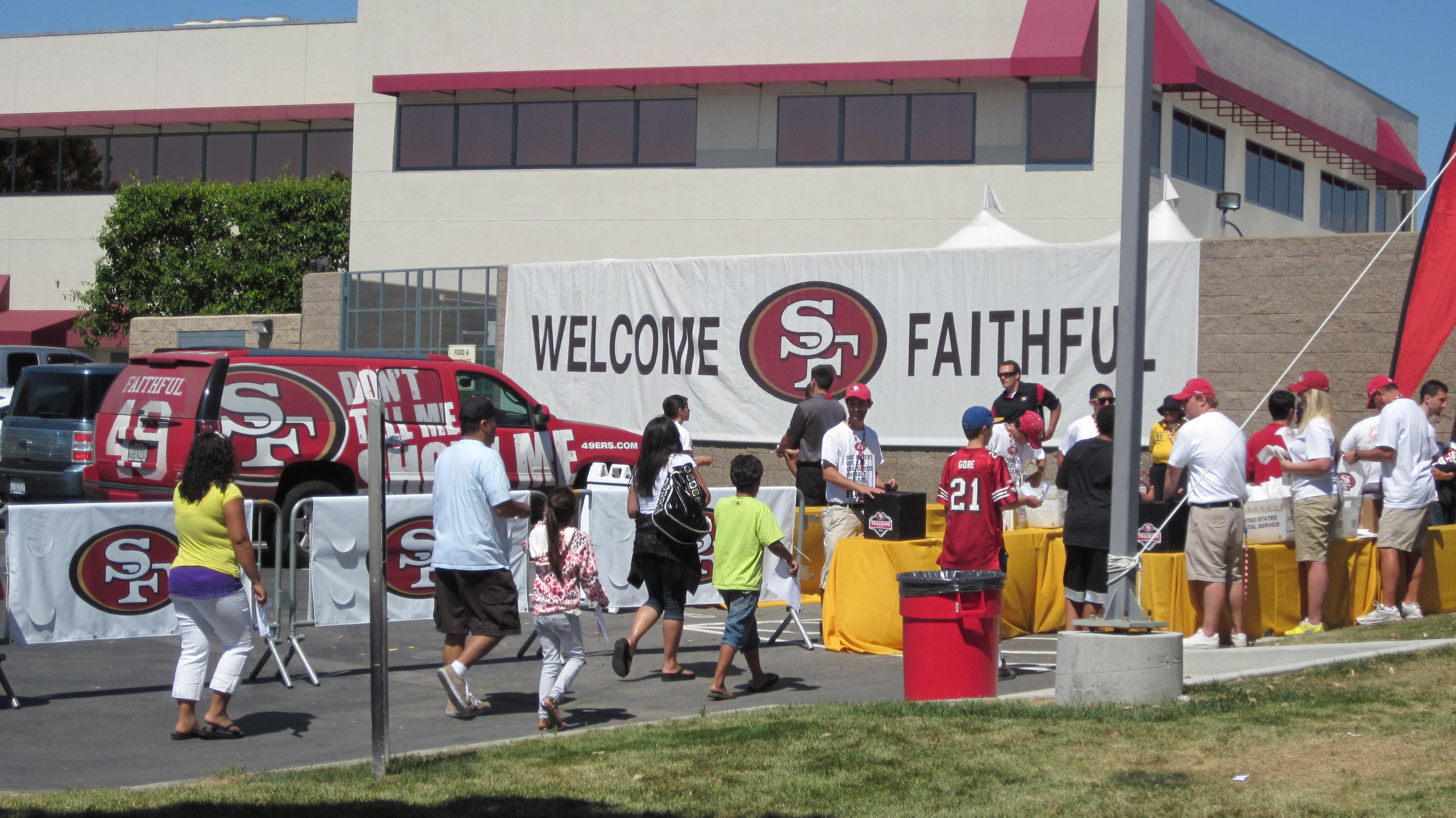
49ers fans attend training camp in Santa Clara on August 9, 2010.

The 49er Faithful often refers to fans of the San Francisco 49ers. There are numerous names in conjunction with the 49ers fanbase such as The Niner Gang or the Niner Empire in regards to their success during the 1980s and early 1990s. Due to the large success experienced by the team in winning five Super Bowl titles in the 1980s and 1990s, the 49ers fanbase extends across the state of California, even into parts of southern Oregon and Northwestern Nevada.

== Fan Support ==
In response to the team's return to playoff contention during the 2019 Season, rapper E-40 popularized a crowd call, with fans chanting "Bang! Bang! Niner Gang!", the chant is still currently used among fans and at most 49er home games. The fanbase has been known to attempt large takeovers of numerous away games ranging from division rivals Los Angeles Rams, Arizona Cardinals, and the Seattle Seahawks to long-time playoff rivals such as the Dallas Cowboys and New York Giants. Fans have also been known to overtake numerous road games of the team's opponents at random, such as the Miami Dolphins, Philadelphia Eagles, Carolina Panthers, and more.

== Controversy ==
Despite the widespread support of fans, there have been several incidents of obnoxious conduct and fan fights recorded during their attempted takeovers, leading to some instances of opposing teams barring ticket sales in Northern California on several occasions. Despite the passionate nature of most 49ers fans, the fanbase has grown a notoriety for violence and misconduct in recent decades.

== Notable Fans ==
- E-40,
- Saweetie,
- Kamala Harris,
- Tamera Mowry,
- Andre Iguodala,
- Julia Roberts,
- Matt Bomer,
- Bella Thorne,
- Jeremy Renner
- Kristi Yamaguchi,
- Andy Samberg,

== See also ==
- Raider Nation
- 12s
