= Seattle Seahawks all-time roster =

1,193 players have appeared in at least one regular season or postseason game in the National Football League (NFL) for the Seattle Seahawks since 1976. This list is accurate through the end of the 2025 NFL season.

== A ==
- Oday Aboushi
- Johnathan Abram
- Sid Abramowitz
- Jamal Adams
- Jamar Adams
- Myles Adams
- Phillip Adams
- Sam Adams
- Theo Adams
- Sam Adkins
- Tommie Agee
- Dave Ahrens
- Charles Aiu
- Cam Akers
- D. J. Alexander
- Maurice Alexander
- Shaun Alexander
- Harvey Allen
- RaShaun Allen
- Ty Allert
- Brian Allred
- Wilson Alvarez
- Ugo Amadi
- Eddie Anderson
- Fred Anderson
- Ricky Andrews
- Stacy Andrews
- Tom Andrews
- Ezekiel Ansah
- Leo Araguz
- Ray-Ray Armstrong
- Elijah Arroyo
- Tom Ashworth
- Baraka Atkins
- James Atkins
- Steve August
- Blessuan Austin
- Cliff Avril

== B ==
- Jason Babin
- Jordan Babineaux
- Ted Bachman
- Curt Baham
- Alvin Bailey
- Dion Bailey
- Edwin Bailey
- Karsten Bailey
- Rodney Bailey
- Chris Baker
- Jerome Baker
- Doug Baldwin
- Howard Ballard
- Kentwan Balmer
- Alex Bannister
- Roland Barbay
- Mike Barber
- Allen Barbre
- Carl Barisich
- AJ Barner
- Cody Barton
- David Bass
- Michael Bates
- Phil Bates
- Solomon Bates
- Autry Beamon
- Nick Bebout
- Frank Beede
- Terry Beeson
- D'Anthony Bell
- Marcus Bell
- Mark Bell
- Jay Bellamy
- Nick Bellore
- Brant Bengen
- Tony Benjamin
- Michael Bennett
- Kevin Bentley
- Rocky Bernard
- Walter Bernard
- Ray Berry
- Duane Bickett
- Terreal Bierria
- Atari Bigby
- Don Bitterlich
- Harold Blackmon
- Robert Blackmon
- Jeff Blackshear
- Lyle Blackwood
- Bennie Blades
- Brian Blades
- Marquise Blair
- Greg Bloedorn
- Joey Blount
- Tony Blue
- Austin Blythe
- Jake Bobo
- Quinton Bohanna
- Ned Bolcar
- Andy Bolton
- Alex Boone
- Jon Borchardt
- Brian Bosworth
- Michael Boulware
- Willie Bouyer
- Michael Bowie
- Barry Bowman
- Fabien Bownes
- Tyus Bowser
- Dennis Boyd
- Jerome Boyd
- Lance Boykin
- Trevone Boykin
- Brett Brackett
- Allen Bradford
- Anthony Bradford
- Ed Bradley
- Alan Branch
- Deion Branch
- David Brandon
- Darrick Brilz
- Larry Brinson
- Justin Britt
- Lou Brock, Jr.
- Raheem Brock
- Jordyn Brooks
- Mic'hael Brooks
- Steve Broussard
- Arnold Brown
- Ben Brown
- Bryce Brown
- Chad Brown
- Dave Brown
- Duane Brown
- Evan Brown
- Jaron Brown
- Joe Brown
- Josh Brown
- Marcus Brown
- Pharaoh Brown
- Reggie Brown
- Theotis Brown
- Tony Brown
- Travis Brown
- Tre Brown
- Brandon Browner
- Beno Bryant
- Coby Bryant
- Cullen Bryant
- Jeff Bryant
- Red Bryant
- Jonathan Bullard
- Louis Bullard
- Michael Bumpus
- Nate Burleson
- Marcus Burley
- Tim Burnham
- Artie Burns
- Ben Burr-Kirven
- Tony Burse
- Blair Bush
- Devin Bush Jr.
- Chuck Butler
- Crezdon Butler
- Deon Butler
- Hillary Butler
- Keith Butler
- Ray Butler
- Dominique Byrd

== C ==
- Bryce Cabeldue
- Joe Cain
- Tony Caldwell
- Austin Calitro
- Jack Campbell
- Chris Canty
- John Carlson
- James Carpenter
- Roger Carr
- Chris Carson
- Kerry Carter
- Chris Castor
- Oliver Celestin
- Jeff Chadwick
- Kam Chancellor
- Zach Charbonnet
- Ike Charlton
- Sam Clancy
- Bernard Clark
- Frank Clark
- Greg Clark
- Louis Clark
- Ken Clarke
- Chris Clemons
- Jadeveon Clowney
- Don Clune
- Antonio Cochran
- Ron Coder
- Rodney Coe
- Randy Coffield
- Chase Coffman
- Landon Cohen
- Keary Colbert
- Colin Cole
- Andre Coleman
- Derrick Coleman
- Justin Coleman
- L.J. Collier
- Alex Collins
- Greg Collins
- Mark Collins
- Jimmy Colquitt
- Darren Comeaux
- Bill Cooke
- Marquis Cooper
- Chris Corley
- Julio Cortes
- Marcus Cotton
- Tony Covington
- Al Cowlings
- Kennard Cox
- Perrish Cox
- Brock Coyle
- Rufus Crawford
- Xavier Crawford
- Mike Croel
- Peter Cronan
- Charles Cross
- Carlester Crumpler
- Bob Cryder
- Ed Cunningham
- T. J. Cunningham
- Jake Curhan
- Aaron Curry
- McClendon Curtis
- Mike Curtis

== D ==
- DeeJay Dallas
- B. J. Daniels
- Darrell Daniels
- David Daniels
- Phillip Daniels
- Amara Darboh
- Al Darby
- Chuck Darby
- J. P. Darche
- Jaelon Darden
- Sam Darnold
- Akeem Davis
- Anthony Davis
- Austin Davis
- Brian Davis
- Chris Davis
- Dexter Davis
- Fred Davis
- Kellen Davis
- Mike Davis
- Russell Davis
- Tyree Davis
- Sean Dawkins
- Paul Dawson
- Vernon Dean
- Donnie Dee
- John Demarie
- Rob DeVita
- Ed Dickson
- Michael Dickson
- Quandre Diggs
- Trent Dilfer
- Terry Dion
- Will Dissly
- Zachary Dixon
- Demarcus Dobbs
- Dedrick Dodge
- Tyrel Dodson
- Ray Donaldson
- Rick Donnelly
- Dan Doornink
- Dale Dorning
- Andy Dorris
- Phillip Dorsett
- Wes Dove
- Forey Duckett
- T. J. Duckett
- Don Dufek
- Bill Dugan
- Quinton Dunbar
- Carlos Dunlap
- Isaiah Dunn
- Kris Durham
- Andre Dyson

== E ==
- Kenny Easley
- Ron East
- Chad Eaton
- Bobby Joe Edmonds
- Ferrell Edmunds
- Antonio Edwards
- Braylon Edwards
- Mario Edwards Jr.
- Randy Edwards
- John Eisenhooth
- Stan Eisenhooth
- Carl Eller
- Emmanuel Ellerbee
- DeAndre Elliott
- Joey Eloms
- Nick Emmanwori
- Rick Engles
- Bobby Engram
- D'Wayne Eskridge
- Ron Essink
- Doug Evans
- Heath Evans
- Norm Evans
- Russell Evans
- Gerald Everett

== F ==
- Don Fairbanks
- Paul Fanaika
- Hebron Fangupo
- Mike Fanning
- George Fant
- Noah Fant
- Austin Faoliu
- George Farmer
- Sean Farrell
- Heath Farwell
- Christian Fauria
- Jeff Feagles
- Grant Feasel
- Derrick Fenner
- Duke Fergerson
- Scott Fields
- A. J. Finley
- B. J. Finney
- Dave Finzer
- Bryce Fisher
- Travis Fisher
- Brian Flones
- Tre Flowers
- D. J. Fluker
- Matt Flynn
- Glenn Foley
- Poona Ford
- Josh Forrest
- Justin Forsett
- Stone Forsythe
- L. J. Fort
- A. J. Francis
- Malcolm Frank
- Byron Franklin
- Jethro Franklin
- Dwight Freeney
- Nolan Frese
- Mike Frier
- John Friesz
- Brandon Frye
- Charlie Frye
- Aaron Fuller
- Curtis Fuller
- Kyle Fuller
- Randy Fuller

== G ==
- Greg Gaines
- Robert Gallery
- Joey Galloway
- Vincent Gamache
- Quinton Ganther
- Frank Garcia
- Rich Gardner
- Terence Garvin
- Myles Gaskin
- Ken Geddes
- Stan Gelbaugh
- Breno Giacomini
- Mike Gibson
- Gale Gilbert
- Cullen Gillaspia
- Garry Gilliam
- Trevis Gipson
- Nesby Glasgow
- Charles Glaze
- Kevin Glover
- Mark Glowinski
- Na'Shan Goddard
- Chris Godfrey
- Randall Godfrey
- Malliciah Goodman
- Marquise Goodwin
- Amon Gordon
- Josh Gordon
- Jermaine Grace
- David Graham
- Derrick Graham
- Jay Graham
- Jimmy Graham
- Deon Grant
- Will Grant
- Carlton Gray
- Chris Gray
- Oscar Gray
- Ahman Green
- Boyce Green
- Howard Green
- Jacob Green
- Jessie Green
- Marcus Green
- Mike Green
- Paul Green
- Rasheem Green
- Sammy Green
- Tony Green
- Andrew Greene
- Danny Greene
- Bill Gregory
- Clint Gresham
- Shaquem Griffin
- Shaquill Griffin
- Justin Griffith
- Russell Griffith
- Winston Guy

== H ==
- Brian Habib
- D. J. Hackett
- Dino Hackett
- Mike Hagen
- Scott Hagler
- Derick Hall
- Tyler Hall
- Ben Hamilton
- Ken Hamlin
- Norman Hand
- Johnathan Hankins
- Merton Hanks
- Ryan Hannam
- Matt Hanousek
- Don Hansen
- Michael Harden
- Andre Hardy
- Darryl Hardy
- Robert Hardy
- Anthony Hargrove
- Kevin Harmon
- Dwayne Harper
- Corey Harris
- DuJuan Harris
- Elroy Harris
- Franco Harris
- John Harris
- Richard Harris
- Ronnie Harris
- Shelby Harris
- Damon Harrison
- Martin Harrison
- Penny Hart
- Roy Hart
- Percy Harvin
- Mike Hass
- Matt Hasselbeck
- Tim Hauck
- Steven Hauschka
- David Hawthorne
- Eric Hayes
- Christian Haynes
- Phil Haynes
- Andy Heck
- Cooper Helfet
- Ron Heller
- Will Heller
- Chris Henry
- Kris Heppner
- Matt Hernandez
- Kelly Herndon
- Efren Herrera
- Will Herring
- Gavin Heslop
- Devin Hester
- Faion Hicks
- Mark Hicks
- James Hill
- Jordan Hill
- Lano Hill
- LeRoy Hill
- Matt Hill
- John Hilliard
- Andre Hines
- Doug Hire
- Bill Hitchcock
- Fred Hoaglin
- Daryl Hobbs
- Kevin Hobbs
- George Holani
- Doug Hollie
- David Hollis
- Jacob Hollister
- Travis Homer
- Tory Horton
- Kevin Houser
- T. J. Houshmandzadeh
- Jaye Howard
- Ron Howard
- John Howell
- Sam Howell
- Brock Huard
- Gordon Hudson
- Orlando Huff
- David Hughes
- Van Hughes
- Joey Hunt
- Al Hunter
- John Hunter
- Patrick Hunter
- Pete Hunter
- Wayne Hunter
- Steve Hutchinson
- Carlos Hyde
- Glenn Hyde
- Kerry Hyder

== I ==
- Germain Ifedi
- Godwin Igwebuike
- Dou Innocent
- Bruce Irvin
- Darrell Irvin
- Mike Iupati
- Jared Ivey
- Horace Ivory

== J ==
- Branden Jackson
- Darrell Jackson
- Fred Jackson
- Gabe Jackson
- Harold Jackson
- Joe Jackson
- Lawrence Jackson
- Michael Jackson
- Mike Jackson
- Tarvaris Jackson
- Terry Jackson
- Edgerrin James
- Sebastian Janikowski
- Lemuel Jeanpierre
- James Jefferson
- Quinton Jefferson
- John Jenkins
- Melvin Jenkins
- Rayshawn Jenkins
- Kelly Jennings
- Michael Jerrell
- Josh Jobe
- Jim Jodat
- Luke Joeckel
- Paul Johns
- Alexander Johnson
- Cade Johnson
- Darryl Johnson
- Dustin Johnson
- Gregg Johnson
- Jeron Johnson
- Johnnie Johnson
- Josh Johnson
- M. L. Johnson
- Norm Johnson
- Tom Johnson
- Tracy Johnson
- Gordon Jolley
- Christian Jones
- Donnie Jones
- Dre'Mont Jones
- Ernest Jones
- Ernie Jones
- Horace Jones
- Jamarco Jones
- James Jones
- Jason Jones
- Josh Jones (born 1994)
- Josh Jones (born 1997)
- Julius Jones
- Mike Jones (born 1954)
- Mike Jones (born 1966)
- Nazair Jones
- Rod Jones
- Selwyn Jones
- Sidney Jones
- Tony Jones Jr.
- Velus Jones Jr.
- Vi Jones
- Walter Jones
- Bennie Joppru
- Charles Jordan
- Dion Jordan
- Kelvin Joseph
- Kerry Joseph
- Matt Joyce
- Kevin Juma
- E. J. Junior
- Trey Junkin
- Joe Jurevicius
- Kerry Justin

== K ==
- Isaiah Kacyvenski
- John Kaiser
- Nick Kallerup
- Tommy Kane
- John Kasay
- Alain Kashama
- Kevin Kasper
- Kani Kauahi
- Thom Kaumeyer
- Jermaine Kearse
- Mark Keel
- Mike Keim
- Kyu Blu Kelly
- Maurice Kelly
- Jeff Kemp
- Pete Kendall
- Derion Kendrick
- Mychal Kendricks
- Cortez Kennedy
- Jordan Kent
- Patrick Kerney
- Amari Kight
- Terry Killens
- Akeem King
- David King
- Jarriel King
- Lamar King
- Reggie Kinlaw
- Levon Kirkland
- David Kirtman
- Jon Kitna
- Tyrice Knight
- Jameson Konz
- George Koonce
- Niko Koutouvides
- Dave Kraayeveld
- Dave Krieg
- Art Kuehn
- Cooper Kupp
- Jason Kyle

== L ==
- Matt LaBounty
- Eddie Lacy
- Dion Lambert
- Eric Lane
- Jeremy Lane
- Steve Largent
- Cedrick Lattimore
- Jim Laughton
- Sataoa Laumea
- Lance Laury
- Paul Lavine
- DeMarcus Lawrence
- Harper LeBel
- Ronnie Lee
- Lazarius Levingston
- D. D. Lewis
- Damien Lewis
- Patrick Lewis
- Roy Lewis
- Will Lewis
- John Leypoldt
- Jeremy Lincoln
- Rian Lindell
- Drew Lock
- Tyler Lockett
- Ricardo Lockette
- Sean Locklear
- James Logan
- Doug Long
- Ryan Longwell
- John Lotulelei
- Julian Love
- Derek Loville
- Shalom Luani
- Abraham Lucas
- Ken Lucas
- Bob Lurtsema
- Marshawn Lynch
- Tom Lynch
- Matt Lytle

== M ==
- Tyler Mabry
- Kim Mack
- Tre Madden
- Boye Mafe
- Terrence Magee
- Dino Mangiero
- Marquand Manuel
- Chris Maragos
- Justin March
- Olindo Mare
- Ed Marinaro
- Cassius Marsh
- Brandon Marshall
- Amos Martin
- Charly Martin
- Jacob Martin
- Kelvin Martin
- Ruvell Martin
- Bruce Mathison
- Ron Mattes
- Al Matthews
- Chris Matthews
- Kevin Mawae
- Byron Maxwell
- Vernon Maxwell
- Deems May
- Derrick Mayes
- Rueben Mayes
- Benson Mayowa
- Ken McAlister
- Dave McCloughan
- Anthony McCoy
- Matt McCoy
- Fred McCrary
- Michael McCrary
- Kelcie McCray
- Sam McCullum
- Lawrence McCutcheon
- Terry McDaniel
- Tony McDaniel
- Andrew McDonald
- Clinton McDonald
- Dewey McDonald
- Bradley McDougald
- Vann McElroy
- Jason McEndoo
- Tanner McEvoy
- Mark McGrath
- Sean McGrath
- Dan McGwire
- Chris McIntosh
- Damion McIntosh
- Kenny McIntosh
- Reggie McKenzie
- Hugh McKinnis
- J. D. McKissic
- James McKnight
- John McMakin
- Eddie McMillan
- Henry McMillian
- Billy McMullen
- Travis McNeal
- Paul McQuistan
- Charles McShane
- John McVeigh
- Brandon Mebane
- Sam Merriman
- D.K. Metcalf
- Pete Metzelaars
- Christine Michael
- Itula Mili
- Bryan Millard
- Keith Millard
- Brandon Miller
- Darrin Miller
- Donald Miller
- Keith Miller
- Terry Miller
- Zach Miller
- Lawyer Milloy
- Rylie Mills
- Brian Milne
- Jalen Milroe
- Keavon Milton
- Barkevious Mingo
- Vic Minor
- Paul Miranda
- Rick Mirer
- Brandon Mitchell
- Alonzo Mitz
- Tony Moeaki
- John Moffitt
- Bryan Mone
- Glenn Montgomery
- Nick Moody
- Warren Moon
- Alvin Moore
- Damontre Moore
- David Moore
- Evan Moore
- Jeff Moore
- Mark Moore
- Rashad Moore
- Mike Morgan
- Cameron Morrah
- Maurice Morris
- Mike Morris (born 1961)
- Mike Morris (born 2001)
- Randall Morris
- Michael Morton
- Winston Moss
- Adrian Moten
- Paul Moyer
- Bill Munson
- Byron Murphy II
- Kevin Murphy
- Tanner Muse
- Steve Myer
- Jason Myers
- DeShone Myles

== N ==
- Joe Nash
- Ryan Neal
- Ralph Nelson
- Nate Ness
- Richard Newbill
- Bob Newton
- Steve Niehaus
- Elijah Nkansah
- Robert Nkemdiche
- Dennis Norman
- Joe Norman
- Kevin Norwood
- Drew Nowak
- Uchenna Nwosu

== O ==
- Ben Obomanu
- Mike O'Brien
- John O'Callaghan
- Patrick O'Connell
- Rees Odhiambo
- Cedric Ogbuehi
- Ty Okada
- Chike Okeafor
- Russell Okung
- Bill Olds
- Greg Olsen
- Olusegun Oluwatimi
- Frank Omiyale
- Raiqwon O'Neal
- Connor O'Toole
- Josh Onujiogu
- Fred Orns
- Tyler Ott
- Robbie Ouzts
- John Owens
- Rich Owens

== P ==
- Walter Packer
- Kache Palacio
- Anton Palepoi
- Curt Pardridge
- Riddick Parker
- Ron Parker
- Colby Parkinson
- Terrance Parks
- Rick Parros
- Josh Parry
- Joe Pawelek
- Logan Payne
- Alvin Pearman
- Brian Peets
- Bob Penchion
- Rashaad Penny
- Dean Perryman
- Mike Person
- Jason Peters
- Adrian Peterson
- Julian Peterson
- Todd Peterson
- Kevin Pierre-Louis
- Brandon Pili
- Eric Pinkins
- Chester Pitts
- Ryan Plackemeier
- Ethan Pocic
- Marcus Pollard
- Robert Pollard
- Larry Polowski
- Tyler Polumbus
- Willie Ponder
- Troymaine Pope
- Rufus Porter
- Alvin Powell
- Tyvis Powell
- Robert Pratt
- Steve Preece
- Ernie Price
- Mike Pritchard
- Nehemiah Pritchett
- Ricky Proehl
- C. J. Prosise
- Etric Pruitt
- Jeb Putzier

== R ==
- Derek Rackley
- Steve Raible
- Greg Ramsey
- Curtis Randall
- Damarious Randall
- John Randle
- Louis Rankin
- Thomas Rawls
- Fred Rayhle
- Cory Redding
- Geoff Reece
- Marcel Reece
- D. J. Reed
- Jarran Reed
- Jerrick Reed
- Nick Reed
- John Reid
- Terry Rennaker
- Keenan Reynolds
- Jon Rhattigan
- Jerry Rice
- Sidney Rice
- Kris Richard
- Howard Richards
- C.J. Richardson
- Jay Richardson
- Kyle Richardson
- Paul Richardson
- Sheldon Richardson
- Mason Richman
- Elston Ridgle
- Ray Roberts
- Marcus Robertson
- Travian Robertson
- Roy Robertson-Harris
- Alton Robinson
- Damien Robinson
- Edmond Robinson
- Eugene Robinson
- Jeff Robinson
- Koren Robinson
- Michael Robinson
- Rafael Robinson
- Shelton Robinson
- Alden Roche
- Mark Rodenhauser
- Tyrone Rodgers
- Ruben Rodriguez
- Charlie Rogers
- Charles Romes
- Jordan Roos
- Dan Ross
- Gerard Ross
- Josh Ross
- Oliver Ross
- Tom Rouen
- Ahtyba Rubin
- Anthony Rush
- Reggie Rusk
- Brady Russell
- Brian Russell
- Jon Ryan

== S ==
- Ken Sager
- Dan Saleaumua
- Bill Sandifer
- Rick Sanford
- Eric Saubert
- John Sawyer
- Dwight Scales
- Bo Scarbrough
- Stephen Schilling
- Owen Schmitt
- O'Brien Schofield
- Bruce Scholtz
- Adam Schreiber
- Josh Scobey
- Ron Scoggins
- Greg Scruggs
- Dexter Seigler
- Jeff Sevy
- Rashid Shaheed
- Jamie Sharper
- DeShawn Shead
- Brandon Shell
- Laviska Shenault Jr.
- Dakoda Shepley
- Jamie Sheriff
- Richard Sherman
- Junior Siavii
- Sealver Siliga
- Anthony Simmons
- Jordan Simmons
- Tharold Simon
- Dave Simonson
- Keith Simpson
- David Sims
- Jack Sims
- Rob Sims
- Michael Sinclair
- Curt Singer
- Paul Skansi
- Jim Skow
- Dallis Smith
- D'Anthony Smith
- Darrin Smith
- Garrison Smith
- Geno Smith
- Kevin Smith
- Lamar Smith
- Malcolm Smith
- Marcus Smith
- Rod Smith
- Sherman Smith
- Steve Smith
- Tye Smith
- Tyreke Smith
- Jaxon Smith-Njigba
- Donald Snell
- Kristjan Sokoli
- Bradley Sowell
- John Spagnola
- Del Speer
- Chris Spencer
- C. J. Spiller
- Bob Spitulski
- Shawn Springs
- Jayson Stanley
- Chad Stark
- Rohn Stark
- Shamar Stephen
- Linden Stephens
- Rod Stephens
- Jerramy Stevens
- Eric Stokes
- Brandon Stokley
- Chris Stoll
- Kelly Stouffer
- Tyronne Stowe
- Mack Strong
- Wilbur Strozier
- Boone Stutz
- Stephen Sullivan
- Jalen Sundell
- Chazz Surratt
- Doug Sutherland
- Freddie Swain
- Jim Sweeney
- J. R. Sweezy
- Tyrone Swoopes

== T ==
- Teez Tabor
- Joe Tafoya
- Darryl Tapp
- Golden Tate
- Lofa Tatupu
- Bobby Taylor
- Cordell Taylor
- Courtney Taylor
- Darrell Taylor
- Jamar Taylor
- Terry Taylor
- Jimmy Teal
- Steven Terrell
- Craig Terrill
- Chris Terry
- Joe Terry
- Tim Terry
- Don Testerman
- Doug Thomas
- Drake Thomas
- Earl Thomas
- Fred Thomas
- Garth Thomas
- Josh Thomas
- Ricky Thomas
- Robb Thomas
- Rodell Thomas
- Cody Thompson
- SaRodorick Thompson
- Tedric Thompson
- Neiko Thorpe
- Walter Thurmond
- Mike Tice
- Carson Tinker
- Dave Tipton
- Rico Tipton
- Robbie Tobeck
- Matt Tobin
- Joe Tofflemire
- Laken Tomlinson
- Reggie Tongue
- Gino Torretta
- Laquon Treadwell
- Brian Treggs
- Jordan Tripp
- Marcus Trufant
- Natu Tuatagaloa
- Marcus Tubbs
- Manu Tuiasosopo
- Will Tukuafu
- Tani Tupou
- Robert Turbin
- Daryl Turner
- Kevin Turner
- Malik Turner
- Rick Tuten
- Robert Tyler

== U ==
- Max Unger
- Eric Unverzagt
- Jerheme Urban
- John Ursua

== V ==
- Steve Vallos
- Nick Vannett
- Jon Vaughn
- David Vobora

== W ==
- Bobby Wagner
- Mike Wahle
- Alex Waits
- Brian Walker
- Byron Walker
- D'Andre Walker
- Kenneth Walker III
- Tim Walker
- C. J. Wallace
- K'Von Wallace
- Seneca Wallace
- Taco Wallace
- Blair Walsh
- Jim Walsh
- Ken Walter
- Bryan Walters
- Spencer Ware
- Curt Warner
- Chris Warren
- Terrence Warren
- Peter Warrick
- Nigel Warrior
- Leon Washington
- Dekoda Watson
- Orlando Watters
- Ricky Watters
- Herman Weaver
- Leonard Weaver
- J'Marcus Webb
- Cornell Webster
- Floyd Wedderburn
- Marquis Weeks
- Todd Weiner
- Dean Wells
- Jeff West
- Warren Wheat
- Chad Wheeler
- Chris White (born 1962)
- Chris White (born 1983)
- Cody White
- Jim White
- Mike White
- Ricky White
- Tracy White
- Charlie Whitehurst
- Charles Wiley
- Michael Wilhoite
- Brandon Williams
- Brent Williams
- Cary Williams
- Connor Williams
- Darryl Williams
- Dee Williams
- Eddie Williams
- Eugene Williams
- Grant Williams
- James Williams
- Jim Williams
- Jimmy Williams
- John Williams (born 1960)
- John Williams (born 1964)
- Kasen Williams
- Kevin Williams
- Kyle Williams
- Leonard Williams
- Lester Williams
- Mike Williams
- Robert Williams
- Ronnie Williams
- Stephen Williams
- Willie Williams
- James Willis
- Jason Willis
- Ray Willis
- Luke Willson
- Ray Wilmer
- E. J. Wilson
- Josh Wilson
- Mike Wilson
- Robert Wilson
- Russell Wilson
- Gary Wimmer
- Easop Winston
- Grant Wistrom
- Devon Witherspoon
- Floyd Womack
- Cedric Woodard
- Terry Wooden
- Al Woods
- Larry Woods
- Tony Woods
- Riq Woolen
- Rolly Woolsey
- Cornelius Wortham
- Jacardia Wright
- K. J. Wright
- Mansfield Wrotto
- Jerry Wunsch
- Dave Wyman
- Ellis Wyms

== Y ==
- John Yarno
- Cameron Young
- Charle Young
- Dareke Young
- Fredd Young
- Renard Young

== Z ==
- Grey Zabel
- Jim Zorn
