= 1987 Seattle Seahawks season =

American football team season

- Owner: The Nordstrom family
- General manager: Mike McCormack
- Head coach: Chuck Knox
- Offensive coordinator: Steve Moore
- Defensive coordinator: Tom Catlin
- Home stadium: Kingdome

Results
- Record: 9–6
- Division place: 2nd AFC West
- Playoffs: Lost Wild Card Playoffs (at Oilers) 20–23 (OT)
- All-Pros: RB Curt Warner (2nd team); WR Steve Largent (2nd team); LB Fredd Young (1st team)
- Pro Bowlers: RB Curt Warner; WR Steve Largent; DE Jacob Green; LB Fredd Young; SS Kenny Easley

The 1987 Seattle Seahawks season was the team's 12th season with the National Football League (NFL). After two seasons of missing the postseason, the Seahawks returned to the playoffs.

The 1987 season would be Kenny Easley's last due to a kidney failure caused from excessive ibuprofen use, which forced him into retirement. The Seahawks selected Brian Bosworth from the University of Oklahoma, who signed the biggest rookie contract in NFL history.

== Offseason ==
=== Draft ===
1987 Seattle Seahawks draft
Round	Pick	Player	Position	College	Notes
1	18	Tony Woods	Defensive end	Pittsburgh	
2	45	Dave Wyman	Linebacker	Stanford	
4	104	Mark Moore	Safety	Oklahoma State	
5	119	Tommie Agee	Running back	Auburn	
5	131	Ruben Rodriguez	Punter	Arizona	
7	184	Roland Barbay	Nose tackle	LSU	
7	185	Derek Tennell	Tight end	UCLA	
8	216	Sammy Garza	Quarterback	UTEP	
9	243	M. L. Johnson	Linebacker	Hawaii	
10	270	Louis Clark	Wide receiver	Mississippi State	
11	297	Darryl Oliver	Running back	Miami (FL)	
12	312	Wes Dove	Defensive End	Syracuse	
12	324	Tony Burse	Running Back	Middle Tennessee State	
Made roster

=== Supplemental draft ===
1987 Seattle Seahawks draft
Round	Pick	Player	Position	College	Notes
1	--	Brian Bosworth	Linebacker	Oklahoma	
Made roster

=== Undrafted free agents ===
1987 undrafted free agents of note
Player	Position	College
Brant Bengen	Wide receiver	Idaho
Nate Blanks	Wide receiver	Western Illinois
Ron Bohm	Defensive tackle	Illinois
Fred Davis	Cornerback	Western Carolina
Paul Day	Wide receiver	Arizona State
Steve Domonoski	Linebacker	Temple
Jim Fox	Punter	Syracuse
Charles Glaze	Cornerback	South Carolina State
Scott Hagler	Kicker	South Carolina
Matt Hanousek	Tackle	Utah State
Henry Harris	Defensive tackle	Georgia
Ray Hairston	Linebacker	Illinois
Eric Hodges	Wide receiver	Florida
David Hollis	Cornerback	UNLV
Marshall Pinkney	Linebacker	Alabama A&M
Ken Rogers	Running back	Mississippi State
Rick Singleton	Defensive end	Virginia Tech
Dallis Smith	Safety	Valdosta State
Daryle Smith	Tackle	Tennessee
Donald Snell	Wide receiver	Virginia Tech
Len Strandley	Kicker	Cal State Fullerton
Mike Teifke	Center	Akron
Ricky Thomas	Safety	Alabama
James Williams	Running back	Fresno State
Ray Williams	Wide receiver	Clemson
Carl Woods	Running back	Vanderbilt

== Personnel ==
=== Staff ===
1987 Seattle Seahawks staff
Front office: President/general manager – Mike McCormack; Vice president/assistant general manager – Chuck Allen; Player personnel director – Mike Allman; Assistant player personnel director – Rick Thompson; Pro personnel assistant – Randy Mueller; Head coaches: Head coach – Chuck Knox; Assistant head coach – Tom Catlin; Offensive coaches: Offensive coordinator/receivers – Steve Moore; Quarterbacks – Ken Meyer; Offensive backs – Chick Harris; Tight ends – Russ Purnell; Offensive line – Kent Stephenson	Defensive coaches: Defensive coordinator/linebackers – Tom Catlin; Defensive line – George Dyer; Assistant linebackers – Rusty Tillman; Defensive backs – Ralph Hawkins; Special assignments – Joe Vitt; Special teams coaches: Special teams – Rusty Tillman; Assistant special teams – Russ Purnell

- Head athletic trainer - Jim Whitesel
- Assistant athletic trainer - John Kasik

=== NFL replacement players ===
After the league decided to use replacement players during the NFLPA strike, the following team was assembled:

1987 Seattle Seahawks replacement roster
Quarterbacks: 8 Jim Plum; 11 Bruce Mathison; 15 Jeff Kemp; 18 David Lindley; Running backs: 24 Daryl Baines; 27 Alvin Moore; 27 James Williams; 29 Rick Parros; 30 Boyce Green RB/KR; 33 Tim Harris; 34 Mike Hagen FB; 36 Michael Morton; 37 Eric Lane; 37 Chad Stark FB; 39 Todd McGrady; Wide receivers: 80 Steve Largent; 81 Brant Bengen WR/KR; 81 Durell Taylor; 82 Curt Pardridge; 83 Jimmy Teal WR/KR; 84 Mike Grant; 86 Donald Snell; 87 Kevin Juma; 88 Russell Evans; Tight ends: 85 Mark Keel; 86 Jeff Lamson; 84 John O'Callaghan; 89 Ken Sager	Offensive linemen: 51 Dean Perryman; 59 Blair Bush; 60 Doug Hire C; 61 Jack Sims RG; 64 Tom Andrews; 66 Stan Eisenhooth; 67 Matt Hanousek RT; 69 Garth Thomas LG; 70 Howard Richards; 73 Ron Scoggins; 78 Tim Burnham LT; Defensive linemen: 68 John Eisenhooth; 71 Van Hughes RE; 72 Bruce Courtney; 72 Lester Williams; 74 Don Fairbanks LE; 75 David Graham; 77 Doug Hollie; 77 Charles Wiley NT; 79 Dale Dorning	Linebackers: 50 Joe Terry ILB; 50 Fredd Young ILB; 52 Rico Tipton OLB; 53 John McVeigh ILB; 54 Joe Jackson; 55 Paul Lavine; 56 Julio Cortes OLB; 57 Tony Caldwell OLB; 58 Rob DeVita; 59 Fred Orns; Defensive backs: 16 Charles Glaze LCB; 20 Arnold Brown; 21 Charles White; 23 LaWayne Foster; 25 Dallis Smith FS; 29 Anthony Blue; 31 Fred Davis LCB; 35 Renard Young RCB; 38 Curtis Baham; 46 Harvy Allen SS; 40 Kim Mack; Special teams: 1 Scott Hagler K; 6 Russell Griffith P; 9 Norm Johnson K; 10 Barry Bowman P

=== Final roster ===
1987 Seattle Seahawks roster
Quarterbacks (QB): 15 Jeff Kemp; 17 Dave Krieg; Running backs (RB): 34 Tony Burse; 30 Bobby Joe Edmonds; 37 Eric Lane; 43 Randall Morris; 28 Curt Warner; 32 John L. Williams; Wide receivers (WR): 83 Ray Butler; 88 Byron Franklin; 80 Steve Largent; 82 Paul Skansi; 85 Jimmy Teal; 81 Daryl Turner; Tight ends (TE): 87 Wilbur Strozier; 86 Mike Tice; 89 Bob Williams	Offensive linemen (OL): 65 Edwin Bailey G; 76 Jon Borchardt T/G; 66 Stan Eisenhooth T; 54 Grant Feasel C; 70 Ron Mattes T; 71 Bryan Millard G; 73 Alvin Powell G/T; 75 Mike Wilson T; Defensive linemen (DL): 95 Roland Barbay NT; 77 Jeff Bryant DE; 94 Wes Dove DE; 79 Jacob Green DE; 61 Alonzo Mitz DE; 72 Joe Nash NT	Linebackers (LB): 55 Brian Bosworth ILB; 53 Keith Butler ILB; 56 Greg Gaines OLB; 52 M. L. Johnson OLB; 51 Sam Merriman ILB; 58 Bruce Scholtz OLB; 57 Tony Woods OLB; 92 Dave Wyman ILB; 50 Fredd Young ILB; Defensive backs (DB): 45 Kenny Easley SS; 25 David Hollis CB; 23 Patrick Hunter CB; 24 Melvin Jenkins CB; 35 Mark Moore FS; 21 Paul Moyer SS; 41 Eugene Robinson FS; 20 Terry Taylor CB; Special teams (ST): 9 Norm Johnson K; 5 Ruben Rodriguez P	Reserve: 33 Tommie Agee RB (IR); 59 Blair Bush C (IR); 84 Louis Clark WR (IR); 68 Randy Edwards DE (IR); 7 Gale Gilbert QB (IR); 47 Ray Harrison LB (IR); 90 James Hood WR (IR); 26 Kerry Justin CB (IR); 11 Bruce Mathison QB (IR); 99 Filipo Mokofisi LB (IR); 74 Curt Singer T (IR); 72 Lester Williams DE (IR); Rookies in italics

- (‡) Denotes strike replacement players.
- (*) Denotes players that were selected for the 1988 Pro Bowl.

== Schedule ==
=== Preseason ===
Week	Date	Opponent	Result	Record	Venue	Recap
1	August 13	at Los Angeles Rams	**L** 14–23	0–1	Anaheim Stadium	Recap
2	August 22	at St. Louis Cardinals	**L** 21–28	0–2	Busch Stadium	Recap
3	August 28	Detroit Lions	**W** 38–10	1–2	Kingdome	Recap
4	September 4	San Francisco 49ers	**W** 34–10	2–2	Kingdome	Recap

Source: Seahawks Media Guides

=== Regular season ===
Divisional matchups this season have the AFC West playing the NFC Central.

A 24-day players' strike reduced the 16-game season to 15. The games that were scheduled for the third week of the season were canceled, but the games for weeks 4–6 were played with replacement players. 85% of the veteran players did not cross picket lines during the strike, putting in question the integrity of the 1987 season results.

The teams fielded by NFL clubs bore little resemblance to those the fans had come to recognize through previous seasons. Fans tagged the replacement player teams with mock names like "Seattle Sea-scabs."

Week	Date	Opponent	Result	Record	Venue	Recap
1	September 13	at **Denver Broncos**	**L** 17–40	0–1	Mile High Stadium	Recap
2	September 20	**Kansas City Chiefs**	**W** 43–14	1–1	Kingdome	Recap
3	September 27	at **San Diego Chargers**	Cancelled due to players' strike			
4	October 4	Miami Dolphins	**W** 24–20	2–1	Kingdome	Recap
5	October 11	Cincinnati Bengals	**L** 10–17	2–2	Kingdome	Recap
6	October 18	at Detroit Lions	**W** 37–14	3–2	Pontiac Silverdome	Recap
7	October 25	at **Los Angeles Raiders**	**W** 35–13	4–2	Los Angeles Memorial Coliseum	Recap
8	November 1	Minnesota Vikings	**W** 28–17	5–2	Kingdome	Recap
9	November 9	at New York Jets	**L** 14–30	5–3	Giants Stadium	Recap
10	November 15	Green Bay Packers	**W** 24–13	6–3	Kingdome	Recap
11	November 22	**San Diego Chargers**	**W** 34–3	7–3	Kingdome	Recap
12	November 30	**Los Angeles Raiders**	**L** 14–37	7–4	Kingdome	Recap
13	December 6	at Pittsburgh Steelers	**L** 9–13	7–5	Three Rivers Stadium	Recap
14	December 13	**Denver Broncos**	**W** 28–21	8–5	Kingdome	Recap
15	December 20	at Chicago Bears	**W** 34–21	9–5	Soldier Field	Recap
16	December 27	at **Kansas City Chiefs**	**L** 20–41	9–6	Arrowhead Stadium	Recap
Note: Intra-division opponents are in **bold** text.

Source: 1987 NFL season results

=== Postseason ===
Round	Date	Opponent (seed)	Result	Record	Venue	Recap
Wild Card	January 3, 1988	at Houston Oilers (4)	**L** 20–23 (OT)	0–1	Astrodome	Recap

== Standings ==
AFC West
	W	L	T	PCT	DIV	CONF	PF	PA	STK
^{(1)} Denver Broncos	10	4	1	.700	7–1	8–3	379	288	W2
^{(5)} Seattle Seahawks	9	6	0	.600	4–3	5–6	371	314	L1
San Diego Chargers	8	7	0	.533	3–4	6–7	253	317	L6
Los Angeles Raiders	5	10	0	.333	2–6	3–8	301	289	L3
Kansas City Chiefs	4	11	0	.267	3–5	3–9	273	388	W1

== Game summaries ==
=== Preseason ===
==== Week P1: at Los Angeles Rams ====
Preseason Week One: Seattle Seahawks at Los Angeles Rams – Game summary

Quarter	1	2	3	4	Total
Seahawks	7	0	7	0	14
Rams	0	20	0	3	23

at Anaheim Stadium, Anaheim, California

- Date: August 13
- Game time: 7:34 pm local
- Game weather: hazy, 70 °F (21 °C), wind SW 9 miles per hour (14 km/h)
- Game attendance: 57,772
- Referee: Fred Silva
- Gamebook

==== Week P2: at St. Louis Cardinals ====
Preseason Week Two: Seattle Seahawks at St. Louis Cardinals – Game summary

Quarter	1	2	3	4	Total
Seahawks	7	7	0	7	21
Cardinals	14	7	0	7	28

at Busch Memorial Stadium, St. Louis, Missouri

- Date: August 22
- Game time: 7:00 pm local
- Game weather: clear, 83 °F (28 °C), wind N 10 miles per hour (16 km/h)
- Game attendance: 60,014
- Referee: Gene Barth
- Gamebook

==== Week P3: vs. Detroit Lions ====
Preseason Week Three: Seattle Seahawks vs. Detroit Lions – Game summary

Quarter	1	2	3	4	Total
Lions	0	10	0	0	10
Seahawks	3	14	14	7	38

at Kingdome, Seattle, Washington

- Date: August 28
- Game time: 7:34 pm local
- Game weather: indoors
- Game attendance: 57,751
- Referee: Bob Frederic
- Gamebook

==== Week P4: vs. San Francisco 49ers ====
Preseason Week Four: Seattle Seahawks vs. San Francisco 49ers – Game summary

Quarter	1	2	3	4	Total
49ers	0	10	0	0	10
Seahawks	21	13	0	0	34

at Kingdome, Seattle, Washington

- Date: September 4
- Game time: 5:05 pm local
- Game weather: indoors
- Game attendance: 60,403
- Referee: Jim Tunney
- TV announcers (NBC): Don Criqui & Bob Trumpy
- Gamebook

=== Regular season ===
==== Week 1: at Denver Broncos ====
Week One: Seattle Seahawks at Denver Broncos – Game summary

Quarter	1	2	3	4	Total
Seahawks	14	3	0	0	17
Broncos	7	13	14	6	40

at Mile High Stadium, Denver, Colorado

- Date: September 13
- Game time: 2:00 pm local
- Game weather: clear, 85 °F (29 °C), 16% humidity, wind S 10 miles per hour (16 km/h)
- Game attendance: 75,999
- Referee: Red Cashion
- TV announcers (NBC): Dick Enberg and Merlin Olsen
- Gamebook

Game information

First quarter

- SEA – Daryl Turner 20-yard pass from Dave Krieg (Norm Johnson kick), 10:24 (SEA 7–0)
- DEN – Steve Sewell 72-yard pass from John Elway (Rich Karlis kick), 9:13 (Tied 7–7)
- SEA – Curt Warner 10-yard pass from Dave Krieg (Norm Johnson kick), 4:35 (SEA 14–7)

Second quarter

- SEA – Norm Johnson 25-yard field goal, 10:18 (SEA 17–7)
- DEN – Rich Karlis 37-yard field goal, 5:31 (SEA 17–10)
- DEN – Rich Karlis 42-yard field goal, 1:17 (SEA 17–13)
- DEN – Steve Watson 4-yard pass from John Elway (Rich Karlis kick), 0:25 (DEN 20–17)

Third quarter

- DEN – Orson Mobley 5-yard pass from John Elway (Rich Karlis kick), 10:21 (DEN 27–17)
- DEN – Vance Johnson 59-yard pass from John Elway (Rich Karlis kick), 1:32 (DEN 34–17)

Fourth quarter

- DEN – Rich Karlis 25-yard field goal, 8:27 (DEN 37–17)
- DEN – Rich Karlis 29-yard field goal, 3:22 (DEN 40–17)

Top passers

- SEA – Dave Krieg: 14/28, 185 yds, 2 TD, 3 INT
- DEN – John Elway: 22/32, 338 yds, 4 TD, 1 INT

Top rushers

- SEA – Curt Warner: 11 car, 83 yds
- DEN – Sammy Winder: 17 car, 79 yds

Top receivers

- SEA – Steve Largent: 4 rec, 73 yds
- DEN – Vance Johnson: 4 rec, 96 yds, 1 TD

Team – pass – rush – total – to

- SEA – 169 – 108 – 277 – 5
- DEN – 338 – 166 – 504 – 2

==== Week 2: vs. Kansas City Chiefs ====
Week Two: Seattle Seahawks vs. Kansas City Chiefs – Game summary

Quarter	1	2	3	4	Total
Chiefs	0	7	0	7	14
Seahawks	3	14	20	6	43

at Kingdome, Seattle, Washington

- Date: September 20
- Game time: 1:03 pm local
- Game weather: indoors
- Game attendance: 61,667
- Referee: Fred Silva
- TV announcers (NBC): Dick Enberg and Merlin Olsen
- Gamebook

Game information

First quarter

- SEA – Norm Johnson 34-yard field goal, 7:16 (SEA 3–0)

Second quarter

- SEA – Daryl Turner 9-yard pass from Dave Krieg (Norm Johnson kick), 9:47 (SEA 10–0)
- KC – Carlos Carson 10-yard pass from Todd Blackledge (Nick Lowery kick), 3:56 (SEA 10–7)
- SEA – Daryl Turner 17-yard pass from Dave Krieg (Norm Johnson kick), 0:51 (SEA 17–7)

Third quarter

- SEA – Mike Tice 2-yard pass from Dave Krieg (Norm Johnson kick), 10:06 (SEA 24–7)
- SEA – Norm Johnson 25-yard field goal, 8:05 (SEA 27–7)
- SEA – John L. Williams 1-yard run (Norm Johnson kick), 4:42 (SEA 34–7)
- SEA – Norm Johnson 46-yard field goal, 0:43 (SEA 37–7)

Fourth quarter

- SEA – Norm Johnson 27-yard field goal, 8:28 (SEA 40–7)
- SEA – Norm Johnson 49-yard field goal, 4:15 (SEA 43–7)
- KC – Carlos Carson 10-yard pass from Bill Kenney (Nick Lowery kick), 1:07 (SEA 43–14)

Top passers

- KC – Bill Kenney: 6/11, 75 yds, 1 TD, 1 INT
- SEA – Dave Krieg: 16/22, 152 yds, 3 TD

Top rushers

- KC – Christian Okoye: 11 car, 30 yds
- SEA – John L. Williams: 15 car, 112 yds, 1 TD

Top receivers

- KC – Carlos Carson: 5 rec, 83 yds, 2 TD
- SEA – Ray Butler: 4 rec, 50 yds

Team – pass – rush – total – to

- KC – 107 – 75 – 182 – 5
- SEA – 137 – 223 – 360– 0

==== Week 4: vs. Miami Dolphins ====
Week Four: Seattle Seahawks vs. Miami Dolphins – Game summary

Quarter	1	2	3	4	Total
Dolphins	7	0	6	7	20
Seahawks	7	3	0	14	24

at Kingdome, Seattle, Washington

- Date: October 4
- Game time: 1:03 pm local
- Game weather: indoors
- Game attendance: 19,448
- Referee: Bob Frederic
- TV announcers (NBC): Dick Enberg & Merlin Olsen
- Gamebook

Game information

First quarter

- MIA – Leland Douglas 14-yard pass from Kyle Mackey (Willie Beecher kick), 9:45 (MIA 7–0)
- SEA – Curt Pardridge 25-yard pass from Bruce Mathison (Scott Hagler kick), 6:44 (Tied 7–7)

Second quarter

- SEA – Scott Hagler 20-yard field goal, 0:00 (SEA 10–7)

Third quarter

- MIA – Willie Beecher 34-yard field goal, 11:12 (Tied 10–10)
- MIA – Willie Beecher 40-yard field goal, 3:55 (MIA 13–10)

Fourth quarter

- SEA – Mark Keel 24-yard pass from Bruce Mathison (Scott Hagler kick), 10:15 (SEA 17–13)
- MIA – John Tagliaferri 2-yard run (Willie Beecher kick), 3:11 (MIA 20–17)
- SEA – Rick Parros 1-yard run (Scott Hagler kick), 1:30 (SEA 24–20)

Top passers

- MIA – Kyle Mackey: 17/26, 179 yds, 1 TD
- SEA – Bruce Mathison: 20/42, 326 yds, 2 TD, 3 INT

Top rushers

- MIA – Ronald Scott: 9 car, 55 yds
- MIA – Clarence Bailey: 10 car, 55 yds
- SEA – Rick Parros: 13 car, 32 yds, 1 TD

Top receivers

- MIA – Eddie Chavis: 4 rec, 58 yds
- SEA – Jimmy Teal: 9 rec, 137 yds

Team – pass – rush – total – to

- MIA – 160 – 164 – 324 – 2
- SEA – 326 – 76 – 402 – 3

==== Week 5: vs. Cincinnati Bengals ====
Week Five: Seattle Seahawks vs. Cincinnati Bengals – Game summary

Quarter	1	2	3	4	Total
Bengals	0	17	0	0	17
Seahawks	0	0	3	7	10

at Kingdome, Seattle, Washington

- Date: October 11
- Game time: 1:02 pm local
- Game weather: indoors
- Game attendance: 31,739
- Referee: Dick Jorgensen
- TV: NBC
- Gamebook

Game information

First quarter

- No scoring plays

Second quarter

- CIN – Marc Logan 5-yard run (Massimo Manca kick), 13:01 (CIN 7–0)
- CIN – David McCluskey 1-yard run (Massimo Manca kick), 3:49 (CIN 14–0)
- CIN – Massimo Manca 28-yard field goal, 0:09 (CIN 17–0)

Third quarter

- SEA – Scott Hagler 24-yard field goal, 8:54 (CIN 17–3)

Fourth quarter

- SEA – Jimmy Teal 8-yard pass from Bruce Mathison (Scott Hagler kick), 3:29 (CIN 17–10)

Top passers

- CIN – Dave Walter: 6/11, 97 yds
- SEA – Bruce Mathison: 15/32, 167 yds, 1 TD, 2 INT

Top rushers

- CIN – Marc Logan: 16 car, 103 yds, 1 TD
- SEA – Boyce Green: 15 car, 68 yds

Top receivers

- CIN – Marquis Pleasant: 2 rec, 45 yds
- SEA – Kevin Juma: 3 rec, 53 yds

Team – pass – rush – total – to

- CIN – 97 – 270 – 367 – 3
- SEA –126 – 90 – 216 – 2

==== Week 6: at Detroit Lions ====
Week Six: Seattle Seahawks at Detroit Lions – Game summary

Quarter	1	2	3	4	Total
Seahawks	21	9	7	0	37
Lions	0	7	0	7	14

at Silverdome, Pontiac, Michigan

- Date: October 18
- Game time: 1:00 pm local
- Game weather: indoors
- Game attendance: 8,310
- Referee: Gordon McCarter
- TV announcers (NBC): Charlie Jones & Jimmy Cefalo
- Gamebook

Game information

First quarter

- SEA – Steve Largent 19-yard pass from Jeff Kemp (Norm Johnson kick), 12:48 (SEA 7–0)
- SEA – Steve Largent 21-yard pass from Jeff Kemp (Norm Johnson kick), 10:49 (SEA 14–0)
- SEA – Steve Largent 2-yard pass from Jeff Kemp (Norm Johnson kick), 3:35 (SEA 21–0)

Second quarter

- DET – Danny Bradley 5-yard pass from Todd Hons (Mike Prindle kick), 13:45 (SEA 21–7)
- SEA – Jimmy Teal 12-yard pass from Jeff Kemp (PAT failed), 11:02 (SEA 27–7)
- SEA – Norm Johnson 43-yard field goal, 0:00 (SEA 30–7)

Third quarter

- SEA – Michael Morton 1-yard run (Norm Johnson kick), 9:26 (SEA 37–7)

Fourth quarter

- DET – Danny Bradley 3-yard pass from Todd Hons (Mike Prindle kick), 9:53 (SEA 37–14)

Top passers

- SEA – Jeff Kemp: 20/27, 344 yds, 4 TD, 1 INT
- DET – Todd Hons: 14/27, 127 yds, 2 TD, 2 INT

Top rushers

- SEA – Michael Morton: 12 car, 28 yds, 1 TD
- DET – Gary Ellerson: 16 car, 61 yds

Top receivers

- SEA – Steve Largent: 15 rec, 261 yds, 3 TD
- DET – Danny Bradley: 7 rec, 50 yds, 2 TD

Team – pass – rush – total – to

- SEA – 324 – 80 – 404 – 2
- DET – 104 – 93 – 197 – 2

==== Week 7: at Los Angeles Raiders ====
Week Seven: Seattle Seahawks at Los Angeles Raiders – Game summary

Quarter	1	2	3	4	Total
Seahawks	7	21	0	7	35
Raiders	0	0	7	6	13

at Los Angeles Memorial Coliseum, Los Angeles, California

- Date: October 25
- Game time: 1:02 pm local
- Game weather: high clouds, 79 °F (26 °C), 76% humidity, wind calm
- Game attendance: 52,735
- Referee: Jerry Seeman
- TV: NBC
- Gamebook

Game information

First quarter

- SEA – Curt Warner 1-yard run (Norm Johnson kick), 7:19 (SEA 7–0)

Second quarter

- SEA – Ray Butler 15-yard pass from Dave Krieg (Norm Johnson kick), 10:00 (SEA 14–0)
- SEA – Curt Warner 6-yard run (Norm Johnson kick), 3:00 (SEA 21–0)
- SEA – Fredd Young 50-yard interception return (Norm Johnson kick), 0:56 (SEA 28–0)

Third quarter

- LA – Todd Christensen 7-yard pass from Marc Wilson (Chris Bahr kick), 11:01 (SEA 28–7)

Fourth quarter

- LA – Dokie Williams 14-yard pass from

Top passers

- SEA – Dave Krieg: 14/20, 192 yds, 2 TD, 1 INT
- LA – Marc Wilson: 13/27, 173 yds, 2 TD, 2 INT

Top rushers

- SEA – Curt Warner: 29 car, 112 yds, 2 TD
- LA – Marcus Allen: 11 car, 29 yds

Top receivers

- SEA – Ray Butler: 4 rec, 73 yds, 2 TD
- LA – Todd Christensen: 8 rec, 124 yds, 1 TD

Team – pass – rush – total – to

- SEA – 149 – 144 – 293 – 2
- LA – 206 – 44 – 250 – 3

==== Week 8: vs. Minnesota Vikings ====
Week Eight: Seattle Seahawks vs. Minnesota Vikings – Game summary

Quarter	1	2	3	4	Total
Vikings	7	3	0	7	17
Seahawks	7	7	7	7	28

at Kingdome, Seattle, Washington

- Date: November 1
- Game time: 1:01 pm local
- Game weather: indoors
- Game attendance: 61,134
- Referee: Red Cashion
- TV announcers (CBS): Tim Ryan & Joe Theismann
- Gamebook

Game information

First quarter

- SEA – Daryl Turner 4-yard pass from Dave Krieg (Norm Johnson kick), 10:39 (SEA 7–0)
- MIN – Wade Wilson 1-yard run (Chuck Nelson kick), 4:21 (Tied 7–7)

Second quarter

- SEA – Curt Warner 30-yard pass from Dave Krieg (Norm Johnson kick), 2:14 (SEA 14–7)
- MIN – Chuck Nelson 29-yard field goal, 0:11 (SEA 14–10)

Third quarter

- SEA – Steve Largent 27-yard pass from Dave Krieg (Norm Johnson kick), 11:14 (SEA 21–10)

Fourth quarter

- MIN – D.J. Dozier 5yard run (Chuck Nelson kick), 6:48 (SEA 21–17)
- SEA – Ray Butler 28-yard pass from Jeff Kemp (Norm Johnson kick), 1:32 (SEA 28–17)

Top passers

- MIN – Wade Wilson: 23/39, 271 yds, 1 INT
- SEA – Dave Krieg: 11/17, 148 yds, 3 TD, 1 INT

Top rushers

- MIN – D.J. Dozier: 11 car, 45 yds, 1 TD
- SEA – Curt Warner: 23 car, 94 yds

Top receivers

- MIN – Anthony Carter: 4 rec, 86 yds
- SEA – Ray Butler: 3 rec, 62 yds, 1 TD

Team – pass – rush – total – to

- MIN – 252 – 143 – 395 – 2
- SEA – 195 – 123 – 318 – 1

==== Week 9: at New York Jets ====
Week Nine: Seattle Seahawks at New York Jets – Game summary

Quarter	1	2	3	4	Total
Seahawks	0	0	14	0	14
Jets	0	10	10	10	30

at Giants Stadium, East Rutherford, New Jersey

- Date: November 9
- Game time: 9:07 pm local
- Game weather: drizzle, 55 °F (13 °C), 55% humidity, wind SSW 6 miles per hour (9.7 km/h)
- Game attendance: 60,452
- Referee: Gene Barth
- TV announcers (ABC): Al Michaels, Frank Gifford, and Dan Dierdorf
- Gamebook

Game information

First quarter

- No scoring plays

Second quarter

- NYJ – Jo-Jo Townsell 91-yard punt return (Pat Leahy kick), 12:16 (NYJ 7–0)
- NYJ – Pat Leahy 35-yard field goal, 0:01 (NYJ 10–0)

Third quarter

- NYJ – Pat Leahy 36-yard field goal, 11:32 (NYJ 13–0)
- SEA – Curt Warner 3-yard run (Norm Johnson kick), 9:14 (NYJ 13–7)
- SEA – Steve Largent 29-yard pass from Dave Krieg (Norm Johnson kick), 6:18 (SEA 14–13)
- NYJ – Billy Griggs 4-yard pass from Ken O'Brien (Pat Leahy kick), 0:21 (NYJ 20–14)

Fourth quarter

- NYJ – Johnny Hector 1-yard run (Pat Leahy kick), 11:03 (NYJ 27–14)
- NYJ – Pat Leahy 26-yard field goal, 1:26 (NYJ 30–14)

Top passers

- NYJ – Ken O'Brien: 12/29, 188 yds, 1 TD, 2 INT
- SEA – Dave Krieg: 23/30, 226 yds, 1 TD

Top rushers

- SEA – Curt Warner: 18 car, 70 yds, 1 TD
- NYJ – Johnny Hector: 20 car, 63 yds, 1 TD

Top receivers

- SEA – Steve Largent: 4 rec, 88 yds, 1 TD
- NYJ – Al Toon: 4 rec, 66 yds

Team – pass – rush – total – to

- SEA – 164 – 111 – 275 – 4
- NYJ – 210 – 132 – 342 – 1

==== Week 10: vs. Green Bay Packers ====
Week Ten: Seattle Seahawks vs. Green Bay Packers – Game summary

Quarter	1	2	3	4	Total
Packers	3	10	0	0	13
Seahawks	0	21	0	3	24

at Kingdome, Seattle, Washington

- Date: November 15
- Game time: 1:02 pm local
- Game weather: indoors
- Game attendance: 60,963
- Referee: Dick Hantak
- TV announcers (CBS): Tim Brant & Hank Stram
- Gamebook

Game information

First quarter

- GB – Max Zendejas 31-yard field goal, 10:07 (GB 3–0)

Second quarter

- SEA – Curt Warner 57-yard run (Norm Johnson kick), 14:50 (SEA 7–3)
- GB – Keith Paskett 47-yard pass from Randy Wright (Max Zendejas kick), 12:49 (GB 10–7)
- GB – Max Zendejas 48-yard field goal, 9:24 (GB 13–7)
- SEA – Eugene Robinson 8-yard blocked punt return (Norm Johnson kick), 2:08 (SEA 14–13)
- SEA – Dave Krieg 8-yard run (Norm Johnson kick), 0:43 (SEA 21–13)

Third quarter

- No scoring plays

Fourth quarter

- SEA – Norm Johnson 24-yard field goal, 14:12 (SEA 24–13)

Top passers

- GB – Randy Wright: 10/19, 134 yds, 1 TD, 1 INT
- SEA – Dave Krieg: 9/15, 105 yds, 3 INT

Top rushers

- GB – Kenneth Davis: 14 car, 75 yds
- SEA – Curt Warner: 25 car, 123 yds, 1 TD

Top receivers

- GB – Walter Stanley: 5 rec, 66 yds
- SEA – Steve Largent: 5 rec, 79 yds

Team – pass – rush – total – to

- GB – 198 – 100 – 298 – 5
- SEA – 88 – 193 – 281 – 5

==== Week 11: vs. San Diego Chargers ====
Week Eleven: Seattle Seahawks vs. San Diego Chargers – Game summary

Quarter	1	2	3	4	Total
Chargers	0	3	0	0	3
Seahawks	3	14	10	7	34

at Kingdome, Seattle, Washington

- Date: November 22
- Game time: 1:02 pm local
- Game weather: indoors
- Game attendance: 62,144
- Referee: Ben Dreith
- TV: NBC
- Gamebook

Game information

First quarter

- SEA – Norm Johnson 34-yard field goal, 12:46 (SEA 3–0)

Second quarter

- SEA – John L. Williams 12-yard pass from Dave Krieg (Norm Johnson kick), 14:53 (SEA 10–0)
- SD – Vince Abbott 33-yard field goal, 10:27 (SEA 10–3)
- SEA – Curt Warner 5-yard run (Norm Johnson kick), 6:13 (SEA 17–3)

Third quarter

- SEA – Dave Krieg 11-yard run (Norm Johnson kick), 12:36 (SEA 24–3)
- SEA – Norm Johnson 22-yard field goal, 0:06 (SEA 27–3)

Fourth quarter

- SEA – Steve Largent 5-yard pass from Dave Krieg (Norm Johnson kick), 9:14 (SEA 34–3)

Top passers

- SD – Mark Herrmann: 12/19, 140 yds, 1 INT
- SEA – Dave Krieg: 19/26, 246 yds, 2 TD

Top rushers

- SD – Curtis Adams: 5 car, 12 yds
- SEA – Curt Warner: 23 car, 119 yds, 1 TD

Top receivers

- SD – Lionel James: 2 rec, 42 yds
- SD – Gary Anderson: 5 rec, 42 yds
- SEA – Steve Largent: 5 rec, 84 yds, 1 TD

Team – pass – rush – total – to

- SD – 139 – 17 – 156 – 4
- SEA – 219 – 277 – 496 – 1

==== Week 12: vs. Los Angeles Raiders ====
Week Twelve: Seattle Seahawks vs. Los Angeles Raiders – Game summary

Quarter	1	2	3	4	Total
Raiders	7	20	10	0	37
Seahawks	7	0	7	0	14

at Kingdome, Seattle, Washington

- Date: November 30
- Game time: 6:07 pm local
- Game weather: indoors
- Game attendance: 62,802
- Referee: Jerry Markbreit
- TV announcers (ABC): Al Michaels, Frank Gifford, and Dan Dierdorf
- Gamebook

Game information

First quarter

- SEA – Daryl Turner 19-yard pass from Dave Krieg (Norm Johnson kick), 5:33 (SEA 7–0)
- LA – James Lofton 46-yard pass from Marc Wilson (Chris Bahr kick), 2:33 (Tied 7–7)

Second quarter

- LA – Bo Jackson 14-yard pass from Marc Wilson (Chris Bahr kick), 12:19 (LA 14–7)
- LA – Bo Jackson 91-yard run (Chris Bahr kick), 9:42 (LA 21–7)
- LA – Chris Bahr 23-yard field goal, 3:42 (LA 24–7)
- LA – Chris Bahr 47-yard field goal, 0:44 (LA 27–7)

Third quarter

- LA – Bo Jackson 2-yard run (Chris Bahr kick), 11:30 (LA 34–7)
- LA – Chris Bahr 23-yard field goal, 5:29 (LA 37–7)
- SEA – Mike Tice 3-yard pass from Dave Krieg (Norm Johnson kick), 0:05 (LA 37–14)

Fourth quarter

- No scoring plays

Top passers

- LA – Marc Wilson: 11/18, 159 yds, 2 TD
- SEA – Dave Krieg: 17/31, 170 yds, 2 TD, 2 INT

Top rushers

- LA – Bo Jackson: 18 car, 221 yds, 2 TD
- SEA – Curt Warner: 11 car, 26 yds

Top receivers

- LA – Dokie Williams: 4 rec, 47 yds
- SEA – Paul Skansi: 4 rec, 54 yds

Team – pass – rush – total – to

- LA – 151 – 356 – 507 – 1
- SEA – 130 – 37 – 167 – 3

==== Week 13: at Pittsburgh Steelers ====
Week Thirteen: Seattle Seahawks at Pittsburgh Steelers – Game summary

Quarter	1	2	3	4	Total
Seahawks	3	6	0	0	9
Steelers	3	3	0	7	13

at Three Rivers Stadium, Pittsburgh, Pennsylvania

- Date: December 6
- Game time: 1:00 pm local
- Game weather: cloudy, 35 °F (2 °C), 80% humidity, wind W 8 miles per hour (13 km/h)
- Game attendance: 48,881
- Referee: Gordon McCarter
- TV: NBC
- Gamebook

Game information

First quarter

- PIT – Gary Anderson 37-yard field goal, 9:07 (PIT 3–3)
- SEA – Norm Johnson 33-yard field goal, 1:47 (Tied 3–3)

Second quarter

- SEA – Steve Largent 12-yard pass from Dave Krieg (PAT failed), 7:47 (SEA 9–3)
- PIT – Gary Anderson 24-yard field goal, 0:19 (SEA 9–6)

Third quarter

- No scoring plays

Fourth quarter

- PIT – Frank Pollard 11-yard run (Gary Anderson kick), 14:56 (PIT 13–9)

Top passers

- SEA – Dave Krieg: 9/15, 91 yds, 1 TD, 1 INT
- PIT – Mark Malone: 11/18, 99 yds

Top rushers

- SEA – Curt Warner: 22 car, 69 yds
- PIT – Frank Pollard: 22 car, 106 yds, 1 TD

Top receivers

- SEA – John L. Williams: 3 rec, 28 yds
- PIT – Joey Clinkscales: 2 rec, 20 yds

Team – pass – rush – total – to

- SEA – 80 – 135 – 215 – 2
- PIT – 99 – 209 – 308 – 0

==== Week 14: vs. Denver Broncos ====
Week Fourteen: Seattle Seahawks vs. Denver Broncos – Game summary

Quarter	1	2	3	4	Total
Broncos	0	0	14	7	21
Seahawks	0	14	7	7	28

at Kingdome, Seattle, Washington

- Date: December 13
- Game time: 5:05 pm local
- Game weather: indoors
- Game attendance: 61,759
- Referee: Bob McElwee
- TV: ESPN
- Gamebook

Game information

First quarter

- No scoring plays

Second quarter

- SEA – Curt Warner 3-yard run (Norm Johnson kick), 5:50 (SEA 7–0)
- SEA – Ray Butler 35-yard pass from Dave Krieg (Norm Johnson kick), 0:22 (SEA 14–0)

Third quarter

- DEN – Sammy Winder 11-yard run (Rich Karlis kick), 12:28 (SEA 14–7)
- DEN – Rick Massie 39-yard pass from John Elway (Rich Karlis kick), 10:36 (Tied 14–14)
- SEA – Ray Butler 40-yard pass from Dave Krieg (Norm Johnson kick), 9:30 (SEA 21–14)

Fourth quarter

- SEA – John L. Williams 7-yard pass from Dave Krieg (Norm Johnson kick), 12:39 (SEA 28–14)
- DEN – Sammy Winder 1-yard run (Rich Karlis kick), 0:25 (SEA 28–21)

Top passers

- DEN – John Elway: 21/42, 335 yds, 1 TD, 2 INT
- SEA – Dave Krieg: 23/33, 238 yds, 3 TD, 2 INT

Top rushers

- DEN – Sammy Winder: 13 car, 50 yds, 2 TD
- SEA – Curt Warner: 22 car, 76 yds, 1 TD

Top receivers

- DEN – Mark Jackson: 3 rec, 85 yds
- SEA – Ray Butler: 6 rec, 107 yds, 2 TD

Team – pass – rush – total – to

- DEN – 308 – 72 – 380 – 2
- SEA – 226 – 141 – 367 – 4

==== Week 15: at Chicago Bears ====
Week Fifteen: Seattle Seahawks at Chicago Bears – Game summary

Quarter	1	2	3	4	Total
Seahawks	0	7	20	7	34
Bears	0	7	7	7	21

at Soldier Field, Chicago, Illinois

- Date: December 20
- Game time: 1:00 pm local
- Game weather: cloudy, 38 °F (3 °C), 79% humidity, wind W 29 miles per hour (47 km/h)
- Game attendance: 62,518
- Referee: Fred Silva
- TV announcers (NBC): Dick Enberg & Merlin Olsen
- Gamebook

Game information

First quarter

- No scoring plays

Second quarter

- SEA – Daryl Turner 12-yard pass from Dave Krieg (Norm Johnson kick), 8:09 (SEA 7–0)
- CHI – Emery Moorehead 3-yard pass from Mike Tomczak (Kevin Butler kick), 0:52 (Tied 7–7)

Third quarter

- SEA – Curt Warner 1-yard run (Norm Johnson kick), 11:10 (SEA 14–7)
- CHI – Walter Payton 3-yard run (Kevin Butler kick), 5:42 (Tied 14–14)
- SEA – John L. Williams 75-yard pass from Dave Krieg (Norm Johnson kick), 5:14 (SEA 21–14)
- SEA – Norm Johnson 45-yard field goal, 3:01 (SEA 24–14)
- SEA – Norm Johnson 29-yard field goal, 1:08 (SEA 27–14)

Fourth quarter

- CHI – Walter Payton 5-yard run (Kevin Butler kick), 12:07 (SEA 27–21)
- SEA – Curt Warner 4-yard run (Norm Johnson kick), 2:10 (SEA 34–21)

Top passers

- SEA – Dave Krieg: 17/26, 214 yds, 2 TD
- CHI – Mike Tomczak: 21/36, 298 yds, 1 TD, 2 INT

Top rushers

- SEA – Curt Warner: 17 car, 75 yds, 2 TD
- CHI – Walter Payton: 17 car, 79 yds, 2 TD

Top receivers

- SEA – John L. Williams: 8 rec, 117 yds, 1 TD
- CHI – Dennis Gentry: 3 rec, 58 yds

Team – pass – rush – total – to

- SEA – 184 – 116 – 300 – 0
- CHI – 276 – 161 – 437 – 5

==== Week 16: at Kansas City Chiefs ====
Week Sixteen: Seattle Seahawks at Kansas City Chiefs – Game summary

Quarter	1	2	3	4	Total
Seahawks	7	13	0	0	20
Chiefs	17	10	7	7	41

at Arrowhead Stadium, Kansas City, Missouri

- Date: December 27
- Game time: 12:00 pm local
- Game weather: drizzle, 35 °F (2 °C), 95% humidity, wind S 3 miles per hour (4.8 km/h)
- Game attendance: 20,370
- Referee: Ben Dreith
- TV announcers (NBC): Gayle Sierens and Dave Rowe
- Gamebook

Game information

First quarter

- KC – Herman Heard 37-yard run (Nick Lowery kick), 14:27 (KC 7–0)
- SEA – Steve Largent 15-yard pass from Dave Krieg (Norm Johnson kick), 10:31 (Tied 7–7)
- KC – Nick Lowery 35-yard field goal, 5:00 (KC 10–7)
- KC – Carlos Carson 81-yard pass from Bill Kenney (Nick Lowery kick), 2:54 (KC 17–7)

Second quarter

- SEA – Paul Skansi 8-yard pass from Dave Krieg (Norm Johnson kick), 14:11 (KC 17–14)
- KC – Paul Palmer 92-yard kickoff return (Nick Lowery kick), 13:53 (KC 24–14)
- SEA – Norm Johnson 39-yard field goal, 10:02 (KC 24–17)
- SEA – Norm Johnson 24-yard field goal, 1:50 (KC 24–20)
- KC – Nick Lowery 44-yard field goal, 0:05 (KC 27–20)

Third quarter

- KC – Mark Adickes 3-yard pass from Bill Kenney (Nick Lowery kick), 6:06 (KC 34–20)

Fourth quarter

- KC – Stephone Paige 46-yard pass from Bill Kenney (Nick Lowery kick), 13:46 (KC 41–20)

Top passers

- SEA – Dave Krieg: 17/32, 202 yds, 2 TD
- KC – Todd Blackledge: 23/35, 320 yds, 3 TD

Top rushers

- SEA – Curt Warner: 15 car, 85 yds
- KC – Herman Heard: 12 car, 107 yds, 1 TD

Top receivers

- SEA – Steve Largent: 6 rec, 95 yds, 1 TD
- KC – Carlos Carson: 4 rec, 120 yds, 1 TD

Team – pass – rush – total – to

- SEA – 195 – 169 – 364 – 2
- KC – 313 – 199 – 512 – 1

=== Postseason ===
Seattle entered the postseason as the #5 seed in the AFC.

==== AFC Wild Card Playoff: at #4 Houston Oilers ====
AFC Wild Card Playoff: #5 Seattle Seahawks at #4 Houston Oilers – Game summary

Quarter	1	2	3	4	OT	Total
Seahawks	7	3	3	7	0	20
Oilers	3	10	7	0	3	23

at Astrodome, Houston, Texas

- Date: January 3
- Game time: 3:00 pm local
- Game weather: indoors
- Game attendance: 49,622
- Referee: Bob McElwee
- TV announcers (NBC): Marv Albert & Joe Namath
- Gamebook

Game information

First quarter

- SEA – Steve Largent 20-yard pass from Dave Krieg (Norm Johnson kick), 11:44 (SEA 7–0)
- HOU – Tony Zendejas 47-yard field goal, 4:44 (SEA 7–3)

Second quarter

- HOU – Mike Rozier 1-yard run (Tony Zendejas kick), 13:17 (HOU 10–7)
- HOU – Tony Zendejas 49-yard field goal, 6:49 (HOU 13–7)
- SEA – Norm Johnson 33-yard field goal, 3:10 (HOU 13–10)

Third quarter

- SEA – Norm Johnson 41-yard field goal, 8:23 (Tied 13–13)
- HOU – Willie Drewrey 22-yard pass from Warren Moon (Tony Zendejas kick), 2:34 (HOU 20–13)

Fourth quarter

- SEA – Steve Largent 12-yard pass from Dave Krieg (Norm Johnson kick), 0:26 (Tied 20–20)

Overtime

- HOU – Tony Zendejas 42-yard field goal, 6:55 (HOU 23–20)

Top passers

- SEA – Dave Krieg: 16/38, 237 yds, 2 TD
- HOU – Warren Moon: 21/32, 273 yds, 1 TD, 1 INT

Top rushers

- SEA – John L. Williams: 7 car, 27 yds
- HOU – Alonzo Highsmith: 12 car, 74 yds

Top receivers

- SEA – Steve Largent: 7 rec, 132 yds, 2 TD
- HOU – Ernest Givins: 7 rec, 89 yds

Team – pass – rush – total – to

- SEA – 221 – 29 – 250 – 1
- HOU – 259 – 178 – 437 – 2
