= 1988 Seattle Seahawks season =

American football team season

- Owner: Ken Behring
- General manager: Mike McCormack
- Head coach: Chuck Knox
- Offensive coordinator: Steve Moore
- Defensive coordinator: Tom Catlin
- Home stadium: Kingdome

Results
- Record: 9–7
- Division place: 1st AFC West
- Playoffs: Lost Divisional Playoffs (at Bengals) 13–21
- All-Pros: None
- Pro Bowlers: QB Dave Krieg; LB Rufus Porter

The 1988 Seattle Seahawks season was the team's 13th season with the National Football League (NFL). The Seahawks won their first division title in the AFC West. They won the division with only a 9–7 record and finished with only a +10-point differential.

The team never went under .500 during the season and clinched the AFC West in week 16 with a 43–37 shootout win over the Los Angeles Raiders. The Seahawks were the #3 seed in the AFC playoffs; they lost 21–13 on the road in the Divisional round to the top-seeded Cincinnati Bengals on December 31.

In late August, Ken Behring and partner Ken Hofmann purchased the team from the Nordstrom family for $80 million.

== Offseason ==
=== NFL draft ===
1988 Seattle Seahawks draft
Round	Pick	Player	Position	College	Notes
2	49	Brian Blades *	Wide receiver	Miami (FL)	
3	75	Tommy Kane	Wide receiver	Syracuse	
4	101	Kevin Harmon	Running back	Iowa	
6	158	Roy Hart	Nose tackle	South Carolina	
7	185	Ray Jackson	Defensive back	Ohio State	
8	215	Robert Tyler	Tight end	South Carolina State	
9	242	Deatrich Wise	Nose Tackle	Jackson State	
10	269	Derwin Jones	Defensive end	Miami (FL)	
11	284	Rick McLeod	Offensive tackle	Washington	
11	299	Dwayne Harper	Cornerback	South Carolina State	
12	326	Dave DesRochers	Offensive Tackle	San Diego State	
Made roster * Made at least one Pro Bowl during career

=== Undrafted free agents ===
1988 undrafted free agents of note
Player	Position	College
Ryan Knight	Running back	USC
Kevin McLean	Quarterback	USC
Pat Pearson	Guard	Southern Miss
Garey Waiters	Punter	Jacksonville State
Arthur White	Linebacker	Florida
Donald Wilson	Safety	Penn

== Personnel ==
=== Staff ===
1988 Seattle Seahawks staff
Front office: Owner – Ken Behring; President/general manager – Mike McCormack; Vice president/assistant general manager – Chuck Allen; Player personnel director – Mike Allman; Assistant player personnel director – Rick Thompson; Pro personnel assistant – Randy Mueller; Head athletic trainer - Jim Whitesel; Assistant athletic trainer - John Kasik; Head coaches: Head coach – Chuck Knox; Assistant head coach – Tom Catlin; Offensive coaches: Offensive coordinator/receivers – Steve Moore; Quarterbacks – Ken Meyer; Offensive backs – Chick Harris; Tight ends – Russ Purnell; Offensive line – Kent Stephenson	Defensive coaches: Defensive coordinator/linebackers – Tom Catlin; Defensive line – George Dyer; Assistant linebackers – Rusty Tillman; Defensive backs – Ralph Hawkins; Special assignments – Joe Vitt; Special teams coaches: Special teams – Rusty Tillman; Assistant special teams – Russ Purnell

=== Final roster ===
1988 Seattle Seahawks roster
Quarterbacks (QB): 15 Jeff Kemp; 17 Dave Krieg; 11 Kelly Stouffer; Running backs (RB): 33 Tommie Agee; 30 Bobby Joe Edmonds; 34 Kevin Harmon; 28 Curt Warner; 32 John L. Williams FB; Wide receivers (WR): 89 Brian Blades; 83 Ray Butler; 84 Louis Clark; 80 Steve Largent; 82 Paul Skansi; Tight ends (TE): 88 John Spagnola; 86 Mike Tice	Offensive linemen (OL): 65 Edwin Bailey G; 59 Blair Bush C; 66 Stan Eisenhooth C; 54 Grant Feasel C; 60 Chris Godfrey G; 70 Ron Mattes T; 71 Bryan Millard G; 75 Mike Wilson T; Defensive linemen (DL): 77 Jeff Bryant DE; 67 Ken Clarke NT; 79 Jacob Green DE; 61 Alonzo Mitz DE; 72 Joe Nash NT	Linebackers (LB): 53 Darren Comeaux ILB; 56 Greg Gaines OLB; 52 M. L. Johnson OLB; 91 Darrin Miller ILB; 97 Rufus Porter OLB; 58 Bruce Scholtz OLB; 57 Tony Woods OLB; 92 Dave Wyman ILB; Defensive backs (DB): 31 Vernon Dean CB/S; 22 Nesby Glasgow SS; 29 Dwayne Harper CB; 25 David Hollis CB/S; 23 Patrick Hunter CB; 24 Mel Jenkins CB; 21 Paul Moyer SS; 41 Eugene Robinson FS; 20 Terry Taylor CB; Special teams (ST): 9 Norm Johnson K; 5 Ruben Rodriguez P	Reserve: 62 Roland Barbay NT (IR); 55 Brian Bosworth LB (IR); 69 Dave Des Rochers T (IR); 63 Roy Hart NT (IR); 81 Tommy Kane WR (IR); 13 Bruce Mathison QB (IR); 51 Sam Merriman LB (IR); 73 Alvin Powell G/T (NF-Inj.); 87 Robert Tyler TE (IR); Rookies in italics 47 active, 9 reserve

- (*) Denotes players that were selected for the 1989 Pro Bowl.

== Schedule ==
=== Preseason ===
Week	Date	Opponent	Result	Record	Venue	Recap
1	August 4	Phoenix Cardinals	**W** 21–7	1–0	Kingdome	Recap
2	August 11	at Detroit Lions	**W** 16–13 (OT)	2–0	Pontiac Silverdome	Recap
3	August 19	Buffalo Bills	**W** 30–13	3–0	Kingdome	Recap
4	August 26	at San Francisco 49ers	**L** 21–27	3–1	Candlestick Park	Recap

Source: Seahawks Media Guides

=== Regular season ===
Divisional matchups have the AFC West playing the NFC West.

Week	Date	Opponent	Result	Record	Venue	Recap
1	September 4	at **Denver Broncos**	**W** 21–14	1–0	Mile High Stadium	Recap
2	September 11	**Kansas City Chiefs**	**W** 31–10	2–0	Kingdome	Recap
3	September 18	at **San Diego Chargers**	**L** 6–17	2–1	Jack Murphy Stadium	Recap
4	September 25	San Francisco 49ers	**L** 7–38	2–2	Kingdome	Recap
5	October 2	at Atlanta Falcons	**W** 31–20	3–2	Atlanta–Fulton County Stadium	Recap
6	October 9	at Cleveland Browns	**W** 16–10	4–2	Cleveland Stadium	Recap
7	October 16	New Orleans Saints	**L** 19–20	4–3	Kingdome	Recap
8	October 23	at Los Angeles Rams	**L** 10–31	4–4	Anaheim Stadium	Recap
9	October 30	**San Diego Chargers**	**W** 17–14	5–4	Kingdome	Recap
10	November 6	Buffalo Bills	**L** 3–13	5–5	Kingdome	Recap
11	November 13	Houston Oilers	**W** 27–24	6–5	Kingdome	Recap
12	November 20	at **Kansas City Chiefs**	**L** 24–27	6–6	Arrowhead Stadium	Recap
13	November 28	**Los Angeles Raiders**	**W** 35–27	7–6	Kingdome	Recap
14	December 4	at New England Patriots	**L** 7–13	7–7	Sullivan Stadium	Recap
15	December 11	**Denver Broncos**	**W** 42–14	8–7	Kingdome	Recap
16	December 18	at **Los Angeles Raiders**	**W** 43–37	9–7	Los Angeles Memorial Coliseum	Recap
Note: Intra-division opponents are in **bold** text.

Source: 1988 NFL season results

=== Postseason ===
Round	Date	Opponent (seed)	Result	Record	Venue	Recap
Wild Card	First-round bye					
Divisional	December 31	at Cincinnati Bengals (1)	**L** 13–21	0–1	Riverfront Stadium	Recap

== Standings ==
AFC West
	W	L	T	PCT	DIV	CONF	PF	PA	STK
^{(3)} Seattle Seahawks	9	7	0	.563	6–2	8–4	339	329	W2
Denver Broncos	8	8	0	.500	3–5	5–7	327	352	W1
Los Angeles Raiders	7	9	0	.438	6–2	6–6	325	369	L2
San Diego Chargers	6	10	0	.375	3–5	4–8	231	332	W2
Kansas City Chiefs	4	11	1	.281	2–6	4–9–1	254	320	L2

== Game summaries ==
=== Preseason ===
==== Week P1: vs. Phoenix Cardinals ====
Preseason Week One: Seattle Seahawks vs. Phoenix Cardinals – Game summary

Quarter	1	2	3	4	Total
Cardinals	0	7	0	0	7
Seahawks	14	0	7	0	21

at Kingdome, Seattle

- Date: August 4
- Game time: 7:34 pm local
- Game weather: indoors
- Game attendance: 54,778
- Referee: Ben Dreith
- Gamebook

==== Week P2: at Detroit Lions ====
Preseason Week Two: Seattle Seahawks at Detroit Lions – Game summary

Quarter	1	2	3	4	OT	Total
Seahawks	0	0	3	10	3	16
Lions	7	6	0	0	0	13

at Silverdome, Pontiac, Michigan

- Date: August 11
- Game time: 7:30 pm local
- Game weather: indoors
- Game attendance: 37,993
- Referee: Red Cashion
- Gamebook

==== Week P3: vs. Buffalo Bills ====
Preseason Week Three: Seattle Seahawks vs. Buffalo Bills – Game summary

Quarter	1	2	3	4	Total
Bills	0	10	3	0	13
Seahawks	3	0	14	13	30

at Kingdome, Seattle

- Date: August 19
- Game time: 7:34 pm local
- Game weather: indoors
- Game attendance: 47,000
- Referee: Fred Silva
- Gamebook

==== Week P4: at San Francisco 49ers ====
Preseason Week Four: Seattle Seahawks at San Francisco 49ers – Game summary

Quarter	1	2	3	4	Total
Seahawks	0	7	14	0	21
49ers	0	0	20	7	27

at Candlestick Park, San Francisco

- Date: August 26
- Game time: 6:05 pm local
- Game weather: clear, 72 °F (22 °C), wind variable 18 miles per hour (29 km/h)
- Game attendance: 53,357
- Referee: Ben Dreith
- Gamebook

=== Regular season ===
==== Week 1: at Denver Broncos ====
Week One: Seattle Seahawks at Denver Broncos – Game summary

Quarter	1	2	3	4	Total
Seahawks	0	7	14	0	21
Broncos	0	7	0	7	14

at Mile High Stadium, Denver, Colorado

- Date: September 4
- Game time: 2:00 pm local
- Game weather: clear, 77 °F (25 °C), 20% humidity, wind N 14 miles per hour (23 km/h)
- Game attendance: 75,986
- Referee: Red Cashion
- TV announcers (NBC): Don Criqui & Bob Trumpy
- Gamebook

Game information

First quarter

- No scoring plays

Second quarter

- SEA – Curt Warner 5-yard run (Norm Johnson kick), 13:29 (SEA 7–0)
- DEN – Orson Mobley 1-yard pass from John Elway (Rich Karlis kick), 3:27 (Tied 7–7)

Third quarter

- SEA – Ray Butler 3-yard pass from Dave Krieg (Norm Johnson kick), 12:23 (SEA 14–7)
- SEA – Curt Warner 14-yard pass from Dave Krieg (Norm Johnson kick), 3:41 (SEA 21–7)

Fourth quarter

- DEN – Mark Jackson 20-yard pass from John Elway (Rich Karlis kick), 4:14 (SEA 21–14)

Top passers

- SEA – Dave Krieg: 14/30, 168 yds, 2 TD
- DEN – John Elway: 21/45, 259 yds, 2 TD, 2 INT

Top rushers

- SEA – John L. Williams: 16 car, 79 yds
- DEN – Tony Dorsett: 9 car, 32 yds

Top receivers

- SEA – John L. Williams: 5 rec, 82 yds
- DEN – Steve Sewell: 5 rec, 81 yds

Team – pass – rush – total – to

- SEA – 152 – 178 – 330 – 1
- DEN – 226 – 76 – 302 – 3

==== Week 2: vs. Kansas City Chiefs ====
Week Two: Seattle Seahawks vs. Kansas City Chiefs – Game summary

Quarter	1	2	3	4	Total
Chiefs	3	0	0	7	10
Seahawks	3	28	0	0	31

at Kingdome, Seattle

- Date: September 11
- Game time: 1:02 pm local
- Game weather: indoors
- Game attendance: 61,512
- Referee: Jerry Markbreit
- TV announcers (NBC): Sam Nover & Jon Morris
- Gamebook

Game information

First quarter

- SEA – Norm Johnson 18-yard field goal, 6:44 (SEA 3–0)
- KC – Nick Lowery 27-yard field goal, 1:11 (Tied 3–3)

Second quarter

- SEA – Curt Warner 1-yard run (Norm Johnson kick), 9:37 (SEA 10–3)
- SEA – Curt Warner 3-yard run (Norm Johnson kick), 2:26 (SEA 17–3)
- SEA – Brian Blades 17-yard pass from Dave Krieg (Norm Johnson kick), 0:51 (SEA 24–3)
- SEA – Jacob Green recovered fumble in end zone (Norm Johnson kick), 0:37 (SEA 31–3)

Third quarter

- No scoring plays

Fourth quarter

- KC – Stephone Paige 15-yard pass from Steve DeBerg (Nick Lowery kick), 13:51 (SEA 31–10)

Top passers

- KC – Steve DeBerg: 22/38, 244 yds, 1 TD, 3 INT
- SEA – Dave Krieg: 14/22, 114 yds, 1 TD

Top rushers

- KC – Paul Palmer: 14 car, 44 yds
- SEA – Curt Warner: 20 car, 72 yds, 2 TD

Top receivers

- KC – Paul Palmer: 8 rec, 105 yds
- SEA – Brian Blades: 3 rec, 39 yds, 1 TD

Team – pass – rush – total – to

- KC – 236 – 50 – 286 – 6
- SEA – 107 – 156 – 263 – 1

==== Week 3: at San Diego Chargers ====
Week Three: Seattle Seahawks at San Diego Chargers – Game summary

Quarter	1	2	3	4	Total
Seahawks	0	3	0	3	6
Chargers	7	3	0	7	17

at San Diego Stadium, San Diego, California

- Date: September 18
- Game time: 1:00 pm local
- Game weather: hazy, 70 °F (21 °C), 74% humidity, wind WNW 12 miles per hour (19 km/h)
- Game attendance: 44,449
- Referee: Jim Tunney
- TV announcers (NBC): Ray Scott and Merlin Olsen
- Gamebook

Game information

First quarter

- SD – Keith Browner 55-yard interception return (Vince Abbott kick), 9:27 (SD 7–0)

Second quarter

- SD – Vince Abbott 48-yard field goal, 13:07 (SD 10–0)
- SEA – Norm Johnson 40-yard field goal, 1:53 (SD 10–3)

Third quarter

- No scoring plays

Fourth quarter

- SEA – Norm Johnson 42-yard field goal, 9:27 (SD 10–6)
- SD – Gary Anderson 25-yard run (Vince Abbott kick), 4:05 (SD 17–6)

Top passers

- SEA – Dave Krieg: 9/18, 134 yds, 3 INT
- SD – Babe Laufenberg: 11/23, 112 yds, 1 INT

Top rushers

- SEA – Curt Warner: 18 car, 60 yds
- SD – Gary Anderson: 19 car, 120 yds, 1 TD

Top receivers

- SEA – Steve Largent: 4 rec, 71 yds
- SD – Darren Flutie: 3 rec, 51 yds

Team – pass – rush – total – to

- SEA – 194 – 105 – 299 – 4
- SD – 78 – 159 – 237 – 1

==== Week 4: vs. San Francisco 49ers ====
Week Four: Seattle Seahawks vs. San Francisco 49ers – Game summary

Quarter	1	2	3	4	Total
49ers	7	10	14	7	38
Seahawks	0	0	7	0	7

at Kingdome, Seattle

- Date: September 25
- Game time: 1:02 pm local
- Game weather: indoors
- Game attendance: 62,382
- Referee: Dick Jorgensen
- TV announcers (CBS): Steve Zabriskie & Terry Bradshaw
- Gamebook

Game information

First quarter

- SF – Jerry Rice 1-yard pass from Joe Montana (Mike Cofer kick), 6:02 (SF 7–0)

Second quarter

- SF – John Frank 1-yard pass from Joe Montana (Mike Cofer kick), 7:55 (SF 14–0)
- SF – Mike Cofer 21-yard field goal, 1:57 (SF 17–0)

Third quarter

- SF – Jerry Rice 69-yard pass from Joe Montana (Mike Cofer kick), 10:05 (SF 24–0)
- SF – Jerry Rice 60-yard pass from Joe Montana (Mike Cofer kick), 2:25 (SF 31–0)
- SEA – Ray Butler 46-yard pass from Kelly Stouffer (Norm Johnson kick), 1:24 (SF 31–7)

Fourth quarter

- SF – Mike Wilson 16-yard pass from Steve Young (Mike Cofer kick), 4:07 (SF 38–7)

Top passers

- SF – Joe Montana: 20/29, 302 yds, 4 TD, 1 INT
- SEA – Kelly Stouffer: 11/15, 133 yds, 1 TD, 1 INT

Top rushers

- SF – Roger Craig: 21 car, 107 yds
- SEA – Curt Warner: 9 car, 29 yds

Top receivers

- SF – Jerry Rice: 6 rec, 163 yds, 3 TD
- SEA – Ray Butler: 2 rec, 52 yds, 1 TD

Team – pass – rush – total – to

- SF – 341 – 239 – 580 – 1
- SEA – 125 – 29 – 154 – 5

==== Week 5: at Atlanta Falcons ====
Week Five: Seattle Seahawks at Atlanta Falcons – Game summary

Quarter	1	2	3	4	Total
Seahawks	7	10	7	7	31
Falcons	3	0	10	7	20

at Atlanta–Fulton County Stadium, Atlanta

- Date: October 2
- Game time: 1:00 pm local
- Game weather: rain, 73 °F (23 °C), 65% humidity, wind SE 10 miles per hour (16 km/h)
- Game attendance: 28,619
- Referee: Gordon McCarter
- TV announcers (NBC): Kevin Slaten & Jerry Kramer
- Gamebook

Game information

First quarter

- ATL – Greg Davis 32-yard field goal, 6:20 (ATL 3–0)
- SEA – Curt Warner 12-yard run (Norm Johnson kick), 2:04 (SEA 7–3)

Second quarter

- SEA – John L. Williams 1-yard run (Norm Johnson kick), 8:33 (SEA 14–3)
- SEA – Norm Johnson 44-yard field goal, 0:10 (SEA 17–3)

Third quarter

- ATL – Greg Davis 31-yard field goal, 11:00 (SEA 17–6)
- ATL – Stacey Bailey 45-yard pass from Steve Dils (Greg Davis kick), 6:51 (SEA 17–13)
- SEA – John L. Williams 1-yard run (Norm Johnson kick), 0:40 (SEA 24–13)

Fourth quarter

- ATL– Steve Dils 1-yard run (Greg Davis kick), 8:01 (SEA 24–20)
- SEA – John L. Williams 1-yard run (Norm Johnson kick), 2:21 (SEA 31–20)

Top passers

- SEA – Kelly Stouffer: 11/21, 164 yds
- ATL – Steve Dils: 18/32, 266 yds, 1 TD, 2 INT

Top rushers

- SEA – Curt Warner: 22 car, 110 yds, 1 TD
- ATL – John Settle: 21 car, 115 yds

Top receivers

- SEA – Steve Largent: 3 rec, 59 yds
- ATL – Stacey Bailey: 2 rec, 95 yds, 1 TD

Team – pass – rush – total – to

- SEA – 149 – 168 – 317 – 1
- ATL – 245 – 140 – 385 – 4

==== Week 6: at Cleveland Browns ====
Week Six: Seattle Seahawks at Cleveland Browns – Game summary

Quarter	1	2	3	4	Total
Seahawks	7	6	0	3	16
Browns	7	0	0	3	10

at Cleveland Stadium, Cleveland, Ohio

- Date: October 9
- Game time: 1:00 pm local
- Game weather: overcast, 53 °F (12 °C), 64% humidity, wind SW 7 miles per hour (11 km/h)
- Game attendance: 78,605
- Referee: Jerry Seeman
- TV announcers (NBC): Mel Proctor & Joe Namath
- Gamebook

Game information

First quarter

- CLE – Kevin Mack 1-yard run (Matt Bahr kick), 6:20 (CLE 7–0)
- SEA – Curt Warner 1-yard run (Norm Johnson kick), 2:10 (Tied 7–7)

Second quarter

- SEA – Norm Johnson 31-yard field goal, 10:25 (SEA 10–7)
- SEA – Norm Johnson 38-yard field goal, 0:05 (SEA 13–7)

Third quarter

- No scoring plays

Fourth quarter

- SEA – Norm Johnson 22-yard field goal, 8:55 (SEA 16–7)
- CLE – Matt Bahr 23-yard field goal, 2:40 (SEA 16–10)

Top passers

- SEA – Kelly Stouffer: 9/17, 112 yds
- CLE – Don Strock: 12/20, 151 yds, 1 INT

Top rushers

- SEA – Curt Warner: 24 car, 96 yds, 1 TD
- CLE – Kevin Mack: 15 car, 66 yds, 1 TD

Top receivers

- SEA – Brian Blades: 2 rec, 33 yds
- CLE – Webster Slaughter: 4 rec, 59 yds

Team – pass – rush – total – to

- SEA – 101 – 126 – 227 – 1
- CLE – 174 – 160 – 334 – 4

==== Week 7: vs. New Orleans Saints ====
Week Seven: Seattle Seahawks vs. New Orleans Saints – Game summary

Quarter	1	2	3	4	Total
Saints	0	10	7	3	20
Seahawks	3	3	6	7	19

at Kingdome, Seattle

- Date: October 16
- Game time: 1:02 pm local
- Game weather: indoors
- Game attendance: 63,569
- Referee: Pat Haggerty
- TV announcers (CBS): Dick Stockton & Dan Fouts
- Gamebook

Game information

First quarter

- SEA – Norm Johnson 22-yard field goal, 6:13 (SEA 3–0)

Second quarter

- NO – Eric Martin 19-yard pass from Bobby Hebert (Morten Andersen kick), 9:25 (NO 7–3)
- SEA – Norm Johnson 47-yard field goal, 3:55 (NO 7–6)
- NO – Morten Andersen 23-yard field goal, 0:00 (NO 10–6)

Third quarter

- SEA – Norm Johnson 46-yard field goal, 11:23 (NO 10–9)
- NO – Dave Waymer 58-yard blocked field goal return (Morten Andersen kick), 2:09 (NO 17–9)
- SEA – Norm Johnson 42-yard field goal, 1:31 (NO 17–12)

Fourth quarter

- NO – Morten Andersen 31-yard field goal, 6:50 (NO 20–12)
- SEA – Brian Blades 3-yard pass from Kelly Stouffer (Norm Johnson kick), 0:38 (NO 20–19)

Top passers

- NO – Bobby Hebert: 16/22, 185 yds, 1 TD, 1 INT
- SEA – Kelly Stouffer: 27/46, 370 yds, 1 TD, 1 INT

Top rushers

- NO – Rueben Mayes: 18 car, 78 yds
- SEA – John L. Williams: 11 car, 35 yds

Top receivers

- NO – Eric Martin: 6 rec, 89 yds, 1 TD
- SEA – Brian Blades: 8 rec, 145 yds, 1 TD

Team – pass – rush – total – to

- NO – 177 – 141 – 318 – 3
- SEA – 341 – 93 – 434 – 2

==== Week 8: at Los Angeles Rams ====
Week Eight: Seattle Seahawks at Los Angeles Rams – Game summary

Quarter	1	2	3	4	Total
Seahawks	0	3	0	7	10
Rams	10	14	7	0	31

at Anaheim Stadium, Anaheim, California

- Date: October 23
- Game time: 1:02 pm local
- Game weather: hazy, 75 °F (24 °C), 83% humidity, wind SW 12 miles per hour (19 km/h)
- Game attendance: 57,033
- Referee: Ben Dreith
- TV announcers (NBC): Don Criqui and Bob Trumpy
- Gamebook

Game information

First quarter

- LA – Greg Bell 1-yard run (Mike Lansford kick), 13:02 (LA 7–0)
- LA – Mike Lansford 39-yard field goal, 4:43 (LA 10–0)

Second quarter

- SEA – Norm Johnson 33-yard field goal, 14:56 (LA 10–3)
- LA – Robert Delpino 37-yard pass from Jim Everett (Mike Lansford kick), 12:06 (LA 17–3)
- LA – Damone Johnson 1-yard pass from Jim Everett (Mike Lansford kick), 4:34 (LA 24–3)

Third quarter

- LA – Aaron Cox 32-yard pass from Jim Everett (Mike Lansford kick), 12:30 (LA 31–3)

Fourth quarter

- SEA – Vernon Dean 62-yard blocked field goal return (Norm Johnson kick), 13:14 (LA 31–10)

Top passers

- SEA – Kelly Stouffer: 16/24, 101 yds, 3 INT
- LA – Jim Everett: 20/27, 311 yds, 3 TD

Top rushers

- SEA – Curt Warner: 16 car, 81 yds
- LA – Charles White: 15 car, 79 yds

Top receivers

- SEA – Paul Skansi: 3 rec, 32 yds
- LA – Henry Ellard: 7 rec, 101 yds

Team – pass – rush – total – to

- SEA – 143 – 153 – 296 – 5
- LA – 311 – 154 – 465 – 3

==== Week 9: vs. San Diego Chargers ====
Week Nine: Seattle Seahawks vs. San Diego Chargers – Game summary

Quarter	1	2	3	4	Total
Chargers	0	0	0	14	14
Seahawks	3	7	0	7	17

at Kingdome, Seattle

- Date: October 30
- Game time: 1:03 pm local
- Game weather: indoors
- Game attendance: 59,641
- Referee: Red Cashion
- TV announcers (NBC): Jim Donovan and Larry Csonka
- Gamebook

Game information

First quarter

- SEA – Norm Johnson 26-yard field goal, 1:39 (SEA 3–0)

Second quarter

- SEA – Brian Blades 23-yard pass from Kelly Stouffer (Norm Johnson kick), 0:52 (SEA 10–0)

Third quarter

- No scoring plays

Fourth quarter

- SD – Anthony Miller 11-yard pass from Mark Malone (Vince Abbott kick), 13:11 (SEA 10–7)
- SEA – John L. Williams 6-yard pass from Kelly Stouffer (Norm Johnson kick), 3:43 (SEA 17–7)
- SD – Anthony Miller 10-yard pass from Mark Malone (Vince Abbott kick), 0:53 (SEA 17–14)

Top passers

- SD – Mark Malone: 20/32, 169 yds, 2 TD, 1 INT
- SEA – Kelly Stouffer: 14/28, 121 yds, 2 TD

Top rushers

- SD – Tim Spencer: 8 car, 69 yds
- SEA – John L. Williams: 15 car, 73 yds

Top receivers

- SD – Jamie Holland: 5 rec, 53 yds
- SEA – Steve Largent: 3 rec, 37 yds

Team – pass – rush – total – to

- SD – 169 – 130 – 299 – 3
- SEA – 109 – 126 – 235 – 0

==== Week 10: vs. Buffalo Bills ====
Week Ten: Seattle Seahawks vs. Buffalo Bills – Game summary

Quarter	1	2	3	4	Total
Bills	3	7	0	3	13
Seahawks	0	3	0	0	3

at Kingdome, Seattle

- Date: November 6
- Game time: 1:03 pm local
- Game weather: indoors
- Game attendance: 61,074
- Referee: Fred Silva
- TV announcers (NBC): Mel Proctor & Merlin Olsen
- Gamebook

Game information

First quarter

- BUF – Scott Norwood 27-yard field goal, 3:37 (BUF 3–0)

Second quarter

- SEA – Norm Johnson 41-yard field goal, 6:24 (Tied 3–3)
- BUF – Robb Riddick 1-yard run (Scott Norwood kick), 1:57 (BUF 10–3)

Third quarter

- No scoring plays

Fourth quarter

- BUF – Scott Norwood 23-yard field goal, 2:38 (BUF 13–3)

Top passers

- BUF – Jim Kelly: 16/25, 180 yds, 1 INT
- SEA – Kelly Stouffer: 10/22, 105 yds, 1 INT

Top rushers

- BUF – Robb Riddick: 18 car, 75 yds, 1 TD
- SEA – John L. Williams: 5 car, 33 yds
- SEA – Curt Warner: 11 car, 33 yds

Top receivers

- BUF – Trumaine Johnson: 5 rec, 52 yds
- SEA – Steve Largent: 2 rec, 56 yds

Team – pass – rush – total – to

- BUF – 194 – 142 – 336 – 2
- SEA – 73 – 72 – 145 – 2

==== Week 11: vs. Houston Oilers ====
Week Eleven: Seattle Seahawks vs. Houston Oilers – Game summary

Quarter	1	2	3	4	Total
Oilers	7	3	7	7	24
Seahawks	7	3	7	10	27

at Kingdome, Seattle

- Date: November 13
- Game time: 1:03 pm local
- Game weather: indoors
- Game attendance: 60,446
- Referee: Dick Hantak
- TV announcers (NBC): Charlie Jones & Jimmy Cefalo
- Gamebook

Game information

First quarter

- HOU – Drew Hill 57-yard pass from Warren Moon (Tony Zendejas kick), 10:19 (HOU 7–0)
- SEA – Brian Blades 23-yard pass from Dave Krieg (Norm Johnson kick), 4:42 (Tied 7–7)

Second quarter

- HOU – Tony Zendejas 52-yard field goal, 14:07 (HOU 10–7)
- SEA – Norm Johnson 40-yard field goal, 6:34 (Tied 10–10)

Third quarter

- HOU – Allen Pinkett 2-yard run (Tony Zendejas kick), 9:28 (HOU 17–10)
- SEA – Curt Warner 3-yard run (Norm Johnson kick), 2:48 (Tied 17–17)

Fourth quarter

- HOU – Warren Moon 11-yard run (Tony Zendejas kick), 11:47 (HOU 24–17)
- SEA – John L. Williams 44-yard run (Norm Johnson kick), 8:17 (Tied 24–24)
- SEA – Norm Johnson 46-yard field goal, 0:01 (SEA 27–24)

Top passers

- HOU – Warren Moon: 13/22, 182 yds, 1 TD, 1 INT
- SEA – Dave Krieg: 14/26, 188 yds, 1 TD, 1 INT

Top rushers

- HOU – Alonzo Highsmith: 9 car, 80 yds
- SEA – John L. Williams: 13 car, 102 yds, 1 TD

Top receivers

- HOU – Drew Hill: 8 rec, 139 yds, 1 TD
- SEA – Steve Largent: 2 rec, 46 yds

Team – pass – rush – total – to

- HOU – 182 – 237 – 419 – 1
- SEA – 188 – 177 – 365 – 1

==== Week 12: at Kansas City Chiefs ====
Week Twelve: Seattle Seahawks at Kansas City Chiefs – Game summary

Quarter	1	2	3	4	Total
Seahawks	0	7	7	10	24
Chiefs	7	7	3	10	27

at Arrowhead Stadium, Kansas City, Missouri

- Date: November 20
- Game time: 12:00 pm local
- Game weather: clear, 34 °F (1 °C), 61% humidity, wind NW 12 miles per hour (19 km/h)
- Game attendance: 33,152
- Referee: Bob McElwee
- TV announcers (NBC): Gary Gerould & Jimmy Cefalo
- Gamebook

Game information

First quarter

- KC – James Saxon 2-yard run (Nick Lowery kick), 1:54 (KC 7–0)

Second quarter

- KC – Christian Okoye 2-yard run (Nick Lowery kick), 4:24 (KC 14–0)
- SEA – Ray Butler 12-yard pass from Dave Krieg (Norm Johnson kick), 1:01 (KC 14–7)

Third quarter

- SEA – Terry Taylor 27-yard interception return (Norm Johnson kick), 14:04 (Tied 14–14)
- KC – Nick Lowery 34-yard field goal, 2:18 (KC 17–14)

Fourth quarter

- KC – Steve DeBerg 1-yard run (Nick Lowery kick), 14:38 (KC 24–14)
- SEA – Norm Johnson 32-yard field goal, 10:13 (KC 24–17)
- SEA – Brian Blades 14-yard pass from Dave Krieg (Norm Johnson kick), 4:20 (Tied 24–24)
- KC – Nick Lowery 40-yard field goal, 046: (KC 27–24)

Top passers

- SEA – Dave Krieg: 20/30, 225 yds, 2 TD, 1 INT
- KC – Steve DeBerg: 16/26, 203 yds, 2 INT

Top rushers

- SEA – John L. Williams: 11 car, 50 yds
- KC – Herman Heard: 16 car, 84 yds

Top receivers

- SEA – Brian Blades: 7 rec, 89 yds, 1 TD
- KC – Stephone Paige: 5 rec, 106 yds

Team – pass – rush – total – to

- SEA – 208 – 105 – 313 – 2
- KC – 203 – 162 – 365 – 2

==== Week 13: vs. Los Angeles Raiders ====
Week Thirteen: Seattle Seahawks vs. Los Angeles Raiders – Game summary

Quarter	1	2	3	4	Total
Raiders	14	6	7	0	27
Seahawks	7	14	0	14	35

at Kingdome, Seattle

- Date: November 28
- Game time: 6:08 pm local
- Game weather: indoors
- Game attendance: 62,641
- Referee: Jerry Markbreit
- TV announcers (ABC): Al Michaels, Frank Gifford, and Dan Dierdorf
- Gamebook

Game information

First quarter

- SEA – Steve Largent 15-yard pass from Dave Krieg (Norm Johnson kick), 6:30 (SEA 7–0)
- LA – Greg Townsend recovered fumble in end zone (Chris Bahr kick), 1:15 (Tied 7–7)
- LA – Tim Brown 49-yard pass from Steve Beuerlein (Chris Bahr kick), 0:05 (LA 14–7)

Second quarter

- SEA – Brian Blades 6-yard pass from Dave Krieg (Norm Johnson kick), 9:18 (Tied 14–14)
- LA – Chris Bahr 46-yard field goal, 6:45 (LA 17–14)
- LA – Chris Bahr 46-yard field goal, 1:50 (LA 20–14)
- SEA – Paul Skansi 11-yard pass from Dave Krieg (Norm Johnson kick), 0:29 (SEA 21–20)

Third quarter

- LA – Steve Smith 4-yard run (Chris Bahr kick), 3:23 (LA 27–21)

Fourth quarter

- SEA – Curt Warner 7-yard pass from Dave Krieg (Norm Johnson kick), 11:17 (SEA 28–27)
- SEA – Louis Clark 20-yard pass from Dave Krieg (Norm Johnson kick), 3:40 (SEA 35–27)

Top passers

- LA – Steve Beuerlein: 4/19, 89 yds, 1 TD, 1 INT
- SEA – Dave Krieg: 16/28, 220 yds, 5 TD, 2 INT

Top rushers

- LA – Marcus Allen: 8 car, 75 yds
- SEA – Curt Warner: 27 car, 130 yds

Top receivers

- LA – Tim Brown: 4 rec, 114 yds, 1 TD
- SEA – Steve Largent: 4 rec, 67 yds, 1 TD

Team – pass – rush – total – to

- LA – 144 – 113 – 257 – 2
- SEA – 212 – 247 – 459 – 5

==== Week 14: at New England Patriots ====
Week Fourteen: Seattle Seahawks at New England Patriots – Game summary

Quarter	1	2	3	4	Total
Seahawks	0	0	7	0	7
Patriots	0	6	7	0	13

at Sullivan Stadium, Foxborough, Massachusetts

- Date: December 4
- Game time: 1:00 pm local
- Game weather: clear, 31 °F (−1 °C), 44% humidity, wind W 25 miles per hour (40 km/h)
- Game attendance: 59,086
- Referee: Tom Dooley
- TV announcers (NBC): Don Criqui & Bob Trumpy
- Gamebook

Game information

First quarter

- No scoring plays

Second quarter

- NE – Jason Staurovsky 34-yard field goal, 13:01 (NE 3–0)
- NE – Jason Staurovsky 22-yard field goal, 9:21 (NE 6–0)

Third quarter

- SEA – Ray Butler 27-yard pass from Dave Krieg (Norm Johnson kick), 13:14 (SEA 7–6)
- NE – Bob Perryman 1-yard run (Jason Staurovsky kick), 8:44 (NE 13–7)

Fourth quarter

- No scoring plays

Top passers

- SEA – Dave Krieg: 9/20, 62 yds, 1 TD
- NE – Doug Flutie: 9/10, 47 yds, 1 INT

Top rushers

- SEA – John L. Williams: 10 car, 20 yds
- NE – John Stephens: 31 car, 121 yds

Top receivers

- SEA – John L. Williams: 5 rec, 37 yds
- NE – Stanley Morgan: 1 rec, 19 yds

Team – pass – rush – total – to

- SEA – 45 – 20 – 65 – 1
- NE – 41 – 171 – 212 – 3

==== Week 15: vs. Denver Broncos ====
Week Fifteen: Seattle Seahawks vs. Denver Broncos – Game summary

Quarter	1	2	3	4	Total
Broncos	0	7	0	7	14
Seahawks	7	21	14	0	42

at Kingdome, Seattle

- Date: December 11
- Game time: 5:05 pm local
- Game weather: indoors
- Game attendance: 62,838
- Referee: Gordon McCarter
- TV announcers (ESPN): Mike Patrick & Joe Theismann
- Gamebook

Game information

First quarter

- SEA – John L. Williams 14-yard pass from Dave Krieg (Norm Johnson kick), 4:38 (SEA 7–0)

Second quarter

- SEA – Curt Warner 1-yard run (Norm Johnson kick), 14:36 (SEA 14–0)
- DEN – Mark Jackson 15-yard pass from John Elway (Rich Karlis kick), 11:05 (SEA 14–7)
- SEA – Curt Warner 1-yard run (Norm Johnson kick), 5:46 (SEA 21–7)
- SEA – John Spagnola 7-yard pass from Dave Krieg (Norm Johnson kick), 0:33 (SEA 28–7)

Third quarter

- SEA – Curt Warner 13-yard run (Norm Johnson kick), 11:15 (SEA 35–7)
- SEA – Curt Warner 12-yard run (Norm Johnson kick), 1:47 (SEA 42–7)

Fourth quarter

- DEN – Steve Sewell 3-yard run (Rich Karlis kick), 0:28 (SEA 42–14)

Top passers

- DEN – John Elway: 21/34, 270 yds, 1 TD
- SEA – Dave Krieg: 19/22, 220 yds, 2 TD

Top rushers

- DEN – Sammy Winder: 8 car, 42 yds
- SEA – Curt Warner: 23 car, 126 yds, 4 TD

Top receivers

- DEN – Mark Jackson: 7 rec, 137 yds, 1 TD
- SEA – Steve Largent: 3 rec, 76 yds

Team – pass – rush – total – to

- DEN – 301 – 101 – 402 – 1
- SEA – 220 – 230 – 450 – 0

==== Week 16: at Los Angeles Raiders ====
Week Sixteen: Seattle Seahawks at Los Angeles Raiders – Game summary

Quarter	1	2	3	4	Total
Seahawks	14	9	14	6	43
Raiders	7	10	10	10	37

at Los Angeles Memorial Coliseum, Los Angeles

- Date: December 18
- Game time: 1:02 pm local
- Game weather: cloudy, 59 °F (15 °C), 77% humidity, wind W 8 miles per hour (13 km/h)
- Game attendance: 61,127
- Referee: Fred Silva
- TV announcers (NBC): Charlie Jones & Jimmy Cefalo
- Gamebook

Game information

First quarter

- LA – Tim Brown 2-yard run (Chris Bahr kick), 9:00 (LA 7–0)
- SEA – Steve Largent 35-yard pass from Dave Krieg (Norm Johnson kick), 6:25 (Tied 7–7)
- SEA – Brian Blades 17-yard pass from Dave Krieg (Norm Johnson kick), 3:06 (SEA 14–7)

Second quarter

- LA – Willie Gault 51-yard pass from Jay Schroeder (Chris Bahr kick), 14:52 (Tied 14–14)
- SEA – Norm Johnson 39-yard field goal, 12:14 (SEA 17–14)
- LA – Chris Bahr 26-yard field goal, 7:32 (Tied 17–17)
- SEA – Norm Johnson 24-yard field goal, 1:52 (SEA 20–17)
- SEA – Norm Johnson 40-yard field goal, 0:13 (SEA 23–17)

Third quarter

- SEA – Brian Blades 30-yard pass from Dave Krieg (Norm Johnson kick), 9:17 (SEA 30–17)
- LA – Chris Bahr 28-yard field goal, 7:49 (SEA 30–20)
- SEA – John L. Williams 75-yard pass from Dave Krieg (Norm Johnson kick), 7:26 (SEA 37–20)
- LA – Steve Smith 4-yard pass from Jay Schroeder (Chris Bahr kick), 1:11 (SEA 37–27)

Fourth quarter

- SEA – Norm Johnson 35-yard field goal, 14:46 (SEA 40–27)
- LA – Mervyn Fernandez 54-yard pass from Jay Schroeder (Chris Bahr kick), 12:54 (SEA 40–34)
- SEA – Norm Johnson 32-yard field goal, 5:18 (SEA 43–34)
- LA – Chris Bahr 24-yard field goal, 2:21 (SEA 43–37)

Top passers

- SEA – Dave Krieg: 19/32, 410 yds, 4 TD, 1 INT
- LA – Jay Schroeder: 22/49, 354 yds, 3 TD, 1 INT

Top rushers

- SEA – John L. Williams: 14 car, 59 yds
- LA – Bo Jackson: 14 car, 67 yds

Top receivers

- SEA – John L. Williams: 7 rec, 180 yds, 1 TD
- LA – Mervyn Fernandez: 4 rec, 113 yds, 1 TD

Team – pass – rush – total – to

- SEA – 389 – 101 – 490 – 3
- LA – 331 – 111 – 442 – 1

=== Postseason ===
Seattle entered the postseason as the #3 seed in the AFC.

==== AFC Divisional Playoff: at #1 Cincinnati Bengals ====
AFC Divisional Playoff: #3 Seattle Seahawks at #1 Cincinnati Bengals – Game summary

Quarter	1	2	3	4	Total
Seahawks	0	0	0	13	13
Bengals	7	14	0	0	21

at Riverfront Stadium, Cincinnati, Ohio

- Date: December 31
- Game time: 4:05 pm EST
- Game weather: cloudy, 42 °F (6 °C), 60% humidity, wind SE 7 mph (11 km/h)
- Game attendance: 58,560
- Referee: Red Cashion
- TV announcers (NBC): Dick Enberg and Merlin Olsen
- Gamebook

Game information

First quarter

- CIN – Stanley Wilson 3-yard run (Jim Breech kick), 9:11 (CIN 7–0)

Second quarter

- CIN – Stanley Wilson 3-yard run (Jim Breech kick), 11:35 (CIN 14–0)
- CIN – Ickey Woods 1-yard run (Jim Breech kick), 7:40 (CIN 21–0)

Third quarter

- No scoring plays

Fourth quarter

- SEA – John L. Williams 7-yard pass from Dave Krieg (Norm Johnson kick), 11:40 (CIN 21–7)
- SEA – Curt Warner 1-yard run (PAT failed), 6:05 (CIN 21–13)

Top passers

- SEA – Dave Krieg: 24/50, 297 yds, 1 TD, 2 INT
- CIN – Boomer Esiason: 7/19, 108 yds

Top rushers

- SEA – Curt Warner: 8 car, 11 yds
- CIN – Ickey Woods: 23 car, 126 yds, 1 TD

Top receivers

- SEA – John L. Williams: 11 rec, 137 yds, 1 TD
- CIN – Rodney Holman: 3 rec, 44 yds

Team – pass – rush – total – to

- SEA –276 – 18 – 294 – 3
- CIN – 91 – 254 – 345 – 2

Seahawks lost and in 1989 missed the playoffs 7-9.
