= Anthony Blue =

American football player (born 1964)

Profile
- Position: Defensive back

Personal information
- Born: September 19, 1964 (age 62); Inglewood, CA

Career information
- College: UNLV

Career history
- 1987: Seattle Seahawks
- 1994: Las Vegas Posse

Anthony Blue (born September 19, 1964) is a former Canadian Football League defensive back.

Graduating from UNLV, Blue played 14 games with the Las Vegas Posse in 1994, making 23 tackles and returning 1 punt.
