= John Eisenhooth =

American football player (born 1962)

No. 68
- Position: Nose tackle

Personal information
- Born: March 3, 1962 (age 64); Harrisburg, Pennsylvania, US
- Listed height: 6 ft 2 in (1.88 m)
- Listed weight: 265 lb (120 kg)

Career information
- High school: Bald Eagle Area
- College: Lock Haven
- NFL draft: 1987: undrafted

Career history
- Seattle Seahawks (1987)

Career NFL statistics
- Games played: 1
- Stats at Pro Football Reference

John Levere Eisenhooth III (born March 3, 1962) is an American former professional football player who was a nose tackle for the Seattle Seahawks of the National Football League (NFL). The older brother of NFL player Stan Eisenhooth, he played college football for the Lock Haven Bald Eagles and is one of only three players in the team's history to play in the NFL.
