= Dallis Smith =

American gridiron football player (born 1965)

No. 25
- Position: Safety

Personal information
- Born: July 31, 1965 (age 61); United States
- Listed height: 5 ft 11 in (1.80 m)
- Listed weight: 170 lb (77 kg)

Career information
- High school: Westover (Albany, Georgia)
- College: Valdosta State
- NFL draft: 1987: undrafted

Career history
- Seattle Seahawks (1987)

Career NFL statistics
- Fumble recoveries: 2
- Stats at Pro Football Reference

Dallis Kevin Smith (born July 31, 1965) is an American former professional football player who was a safety for the Seattle Seahawks of the National Football League (NFL). He played college football for the Valdosta State Blazers.

After not being selected in the 1987 NFL draft, Smith signed with the Seahawks. Prior to the start of the 1987 NFL season, he was waived in mid-August. Due to that season's player strike, Smith was signed by the Seahawks as a replacement player, making the team's roster for their October 4 game against the Miami Dolphins. Some sources indicate he played in, and started, three games for the 1987 Seahawks.

Smith played high school football at Westover Comprehensive High School in Albany, Georgia. As of 2004, he was coaching high school basketball there, a position he still held in 2013.
