= Ray Butler (American football) =

American football player (born 1956)

No. 80, 83
- Position: Wide receiver

Personal information
- Born: June 28, 1956 (age 70); Port Lavaca, Texas, U.S.
- Listed height: 6 ft 3 in (1.91 m)
- Listed weight: 200 lb (91 kg)

Career information
- High school: Sweeny (Sweeny, Texas)
- College: USC
- NFL draft: 1980: 4th round, 88th overall pick

Career history
- Baltimore/Indianapolis Colts (1980–1985); Seattle Seahawks (1985–1988); Cleveland Browns (1989)*
- * Offseason or practice squad member only

Awards and highlights
- PFWA All-Rookie Team (1980); Second-team All-Pac-10 (1979)

Career NFL statistics
- Receptions: 239
- Receiving yards: 3,948
- Touchdowns: 37
- Stats at Pro Football Reference

Raymond Leonard Butler (born June 28, 1956) is an American former professional football player who was a wide receiver in the National Football League (NFL).

== College career ==
Butler played college football at the University of Southern California. He played in a total of 25 games for USC in 1978 and 1979 as a wide receiver and return specialist. He caught a total of 30 passes for 451 yards (but no touchdowns), and returned a total of 48 punts for 474 yards (and 1 touchdown), and 37 kickoffs for 723 yards.

== Professional career ==
Butler played in the National Football League between 1980 and 1988. In 1981, his peak year, he was fourth in the league with 9 receiving touchdowns. His lifetime total number of touchdowns was 37. After being drafted 88th overall, in the 4th round of the 1980 draft by the Baltimore Colts, he played for the club through their move to Indianapolis until the last two games of the 1985 season, when he played with the Seattle Seahawks, his team through 1988.

== NFL career statistics ==
Legend
**Bold**	Career high

=== Regular season ===
Year	Team	Games		Receiving				
Year	Team	GP	GS	Rec	Yds	Avg	Lng	TD
1980	BAL	**16**	**16**	34	574	16.9	42	2
1981	BAL	**16**	**16**	**46**	**832**	18.1	67	**9**
1982	BAL	9	9	17	268	15.8	53	2
1983	BAL	11	7	10	207	**20.7**	60	3
1984	IND	**16**	15	43	664	15.4	**74**	6
1985	IND	11	9	19	345	18.2	72	2
1985	SEA	2	0	0	0	0.0	0	0
1986	SEA	**16**	0	19	351	18.5	67	4
1987	SEA	12	3	33	465	14.1	40	5
1988	SEA	11	5	18	242	13.4	46	4
		120	80	239	3,948	16.5	74	37

=== Playoffs ===
Year	Team	Games		Receiving				
Year	Team	GP	GS	Rec	Yds	Avg	Lng	TD
1987	SEA	**1**	**1**	**3**	**73**	**24.3**	**32**	0
1988	SEA	**1**	0	2	40	20.0	**32**	0
		2	1	5	113	22.6	32	0

== Post-NFL career ==
Butler resides in Texas, where he has coached high school football at KIPP Academy and Sweeny High School, and is wide receiver coach for the Texas A&T Drillers.
