= Curt Pardridge =

American football player (born 1964)

No. 82
- Position: Wide receiver

Personal information
- Born: March 12, 1964 (age 62); DeKalb, Illinois, U.S.
- Listed height: 5 ft 10 in (1.78 m)
- Listed weight: 175 lb (79 kg)

Career information
- High school: DeKalb
- College: Northern Illinois
- NFL draft: 1986: 6th round, 155th overall pick

Career history
- San Diego Chargers (1986)*; Green Bay Packers (1986)*; Seattle Seahawks (1987)
- * Offseason or practice squad member only

Career NFL statistics
- Receptions: 8
- Receiving yards: 145
- Touchdowns: 1
- Stats at Pro Football Reference

Curt Pardridge (born March 12, 1964) is an American former professional football player who was a wide receiver in the National Football League (NFL). He played college football for the Northern Illinois Huskies and was selected by the San Diego Chargers in the sixth round of the 1986 NFL draft with the 155th overall pick. He played for the Seattle Seahawks in 1987.
