= Fredd Young =

American football player (1961–2026)

No. 50, 56
- Position: Linebacker

Personal information
- Born: November 14, 1961; Dallas, Texas, U.S.
- Died: September 15, 2026 (aged 64)
- Listed height: 6 ft 1 in (1.85 m)
- Listed weight: 233 lb (106 kg)

Career information
- High school: Woodrow Wilson (Dallas)
- College: New Mexico State
- NFL draft: 1984: 3rd round, 76th overall pick

Career history
- Seattle Seahawks (1984–1987); Indianapolis Colts (1988–1990)

Awards and highlights
- 2× First-team All-Pro (1984, 1987); 4× Pro Bowl (1984–1987); Seattle Seahawks 35th Anniversary Team; Seattle Seahawks Top 50 players

Career NFL statistics
- Sacks: 21.0
- Interceptions: 3
- Stats at Pro Football Reference

Frederick Kimball Young (November 14, 1961 – September 15, 2026) was an American professional football player who was a linebacker for seven seasons in the National Football League (NFL) for the Seattle Seahawks and Indianapolis Colts. He was selected to four Pro Bowls - two on special teams and two as a linebacker. He was renowned as a heavy hitter and was featured in the NFL film The NFL Crunch Course. He played college football for the New Mexico State Aggies.

== College career ==
Young was a graduate of Woodrow Wilson High School in Dallas, Texas, the first high school to produce two Heisman Trophy winners. Young was a 2-year letterman in basketball and football. He received a full athletic scholarship to New Mexico State University (NMSU), was a part of the first-team all-Missouri Valley Conference from 1981 to 1983, the AP honorable mention all-American team in 1983, and the 1983 Sporting News honorable mention all-American team. He was voted to the NMSU Hall of Fame and Aggie Legend, and he was drafted in the third round of the 1984 NFL draft, the 76th overall pick.

== Professional career ==
Young's jersey number for the Seahawks was 50. He is perhaps most famous for being the Seattle Seahawks special teams player of the year for 1984–85, and a stalwart in the middle of the Seahawks defense from 1985 to 1987.

In May 1988, after four consecutive Pro Bowls and two All-Pro selections (for special teams and strong inside linebacker), he was traded to Indianapolis for the Colts' 1st-round draft picks in 1989 and 1990. He retired after three years in Indianapolis due to injuries.

== Death ==
Young died on September 15, 2026, at the age of 64.
