= Wes Dove =

American football player (1964-1989)

No. 94
- Position: Defensive end

Personal information
- Born: February 9, 1964; Buffalo, New York, U.S.
- Died: March 5, 1989 (aged 25); Gaithersburg, Maryland, U.S.
- Listed height: 6 ft 7 in (2.01 m)
- Listed weight: 270 lb (122 kg)

Career information
- High school: Kenmore East
- College: Syracuse
- NFL draft: 1987: 12th round, 312th overall pick

Career history
- Seattle Seahawks (1987); Kansas City Chiefs (1988)*
- * Offseason or practice squad member only

Career NFL statistics
- Games played: 2
- Stats at Pro Football Reference

Wesley Walker Dove (February 9, 1964 – March 5, 1989) was an American professional football defensive end who played for the Seattle Seahawks of the National Football League (NFL). He played college football at Syracuse University.

Dove committed suicide one year after the end of his football career, at the age of 25.
