= Brant Bengen =

American football player (born 1964)

No. 81
- Position: Wide receiver

Personal information
- Born: March 30, 1964 (age 62)
- Listed height: 5 ft 8 in (1.73 m)
- Listed weight: 172 lb (78 kg)

Career information
- High school: Bellingham (Bellingham, Washington)
- College: Idaho
- NFL draft: 1987: undrafted

Career history
- Seattle Seahawks (1987)

Career NFL statistics
- Games played: 3
- Receptions: 2
- Receiving yards: 33
- Stats at Pro Football Reference

Brant Wayne Bengen (born March 30, 1964) is an American former professional football player who was a wide receiver for the Seattle Seahawks of the National Football League (NFL). He played college football for the Idaho Vandals.
