= Doug Hollie =

American football player (born 1960)

No. 77, 78
- Position: Defensive end

Personal information
- Born: December 15, 1960 (age 65); Detroit, Michigan
- Listed height: 6 ft 4 in (1.93 m)
- Listed weight: 265 lb (120 kg)

Career information
- High school: Highland Park (MI)
- College: SMU
- Supplemental draft: 1984: 3rd round

Career history
- Pittsburgh Maulers (1984); Oakland Invaders (1985); Seattle Seahawks (1987–1988)
- Stats at Pro Football Reference

Doug Hollie (born December 15, 1960) is an American former professional football player who was a defensive end in the National Football League (NFL). He was selected in the third round (74th overall) of the 1984 Supplemental Draft by the Detroit Lions. He played for the Pittsburgh Maulers in 1984, the Oakland Invaders in 1985 and for the Seattle Seahawks from 1987 to 1988.
