= Darrin Miller =

American football player (born 1965)

No. 91
- Position: Linebacker

Personal information
- Born: March 24, 1965 (age 61); Altoona, Pennsylvania, U.S.
- Listed height: 6 ft 1 in (1.85 m)
- Listed weight: 227 lb (103 kg)

Career information
- High school: Hunterdon Central
- College: Tennessee (1983–1987)
- NFL draft: 1988: undrafted

Career history
- Seattle Seahawks (1988–1989)

Career NFL statistics
- Fumble recoveries: 2
- Interceptions: 1
- Stats at Pro Football Reference

Darrin James Miller (born March 24, 1965) is an American former professional football player who was a linebacker for the Seattle Seahawks of the National Football League (NFL) in 1988 and 1989. He played in 32 games and recorded one interception and two fumble recoveries. He played college football for the Tennessee Volunteers.
