= Robert Tyler (American football) =

American football player (born 1965)

No. 87
- Position: Tight end

Personal information
- Born: October 12, 1965 (age 61); Savannah, Georgia, U.S.
- Listed height: 6 ft 5 in (1.96 m)
- Listed weight: 259 lb (117 kg)

Career information
- High school: Wagener-Salley (Wagener, South Carolina)
- College: South Carolina State
- NFL draft: 1988: 8th round, 215th overall pick

Career history
- Seattle Seahawks (1988–1989); Los Angeles Raiders (1991)*; Indianapolis Colts (1991)*
- * Offseason or practice squad member only

Career NFL statistics
- Receptions: 14
- Receiving yards: 148
- Stats at Pro Football Reference

Robert Tyler (born October 12, 1965) is an American former professional football player who was a tight end in the National Football League (NFL) for the Seattle Seahawks, who selected him in the eighth round of the 1988 NFL draft with the 215th overall pick. He played college football for the South Carolina State Bulldogs.

Pre-draft measurables
Height	Weight	Hand span	40-yard dash	10-yard split	20-yard split	20-yard shuttle	Vertical jump	Broad jump	Bench press
6 ft 5 in (1.96 m)	259 lb (117 kg)	10 in (0.25 m)	5.02 s	1.76 s	2.94 s	4.85 s	27.0 in (0.69 m)	8 ft 8 in (2.64 m)	15 reps
