= Donald Snell =

American football player (born 1965)

No. 87, 86
- Position: Wide receiver

Personal information
- Born: March 13, 1965 (age 61); Radford, Virginia, U.S.
- Listed height: 6 ft 0 in (1.83 m)
- Listed weight: 185 lb (84 kg)

Career information
- High school: Radford
- College: Virginia Tech
- NFL draft: 1987: undrafted

Career history
- Seattle Seahawks (1987)
- Stats at Pro Football Reference

Donald Wayne Snell (born March 13, 1965) is an American former professional football wide receiver who played for the Seattle Seahawks of the National Football League (NFL). He played college football at Virginia Tech.

He attended Radford High School.
