= Barry Bowman =

American football player (born 1964)

No. 7
- Position: Punter

Personal information
- Born: December 18, 1964 (age 61); Port Arthur, Texas, U.S.
- Listed height: 5 ft 11 in (1.80 m)
- Listed weight: 190 lb (86 kg)

Career information
- High school: Spring Hill (Longview, Texas)
- College: Louisiana Tech (1983–1986)
- NFL draft: 1987: undrafted

Career history
- Los Angeles Rams (1987)*; Seattle Seahawks (1987)
- * Offseason or practice squad member only
- Stats at Pro Football Reference

Barron Dean Bowman (born December 18, 1964) is an American former professional football player who was a punter for one season with the Seattle Seahawks of the National Football League (NFL). He played college football at Louisiana Tech. He was also a member of the Los Angeles Rams.

== Early life and college ==
Barron Dean Bowman was born on December 18, 1964, in Port Arthur, Texas. He attended Spring Hill High in Longview, Texas.

He was a four-year letterman for the Louisiana Tech Bulldogs of Louisiana Tech University from 1983 to 1986.

== Professional career ==
After going undrafted in the 1987 NFL draft, Bowman signed with the Los Angeles Rams on May 1. He was traded to the Seattle Seahawks on August 25, 1987. He was released on September 8. He was later re-signed by the Seahawks on October 14, during the 1987 NFL players strike. Bowman played in one game for the Seahawks, punting three times for 104 yards in a 37–14 victory over the Detroit Lions. He was released by the Seahawks on October 20, 1987, after the strike ended.

== Coaching career ==
Bowman has spent over 30 years as a high school football coach. He won three consecutive state titles at Daingerfield High School from 2008 to 2010. He has also coached high school track.
