= Matt Hanousek =

American football player (born 1963)

No. 67
- Positions: Tackle, guard

Personal information
- Born: August 16, 1963 (age 63); Saint Paul, Minnesota, U.S.
- Listed height: 6 ft 4 in (1.93 m)
- Listed weight: 265 lb (120 kg)

Career information
- High school: Saint Thomas Academy (Mendota Heights, Minnesota)
- College: Drake; Utah State
- NFL draft: 1987: undrafted

Career history
- Seattle Seahawks (1987)

Career NFL statistics
- Games played: 3
- Games started: 3
- Stats at Pro Football Reference

Matthew Joseph Hanousek (born August 16, 1963) is an American former professional football player who was an offensive lineman for one season with the Seattle Seahawks of the National Football League (NFL). He played college football for the Drake Bulldogs and Utah State Aggies.

== Early life ==
Matthew Joseph Hanousek was born on August 16, 1963, in Saint Paul, Minnesota. For high school, he attended St. Thomas Academy in Mendota Heights, Minnesota.

Hanousek was a member of the Drake Bulldogs from 1983 to 1985, and the Utah State Aggies in 1986.

== Professional career ==
Hanousek spent the 1987 off-season with the Seattle Seahawks of the NFL and was released by the team on August 25, 1987. He was re-signed by the Seahawks as a replacement player on September 23, 1987 during the NFL players' strike. He started all three of the Seahawks games involving replacement players during the 1987 season. Hanousek was released again after the strike ended.
