= Julio Cortes (American football) =

American football player (born 1962)

No. 56
- Position: Linebacker

Personal information
- Born: August 13, 1962 (age 64); New York, New York, U.S.
- Listed height: 6 ft 0 in (1.83 m)
- Listed weight: 226 lb (103 kg)

Career information
- High school: Christopher Columbus
- College: Miami (FL)
- NFL draft: 1985: undrafted

Career history
- Seattle Seahawks (1987)

Awards and highlights
- National champion (1983)
- Stats at Pro Football Reference

Julio Ceaser Cortes (born August 13, 1962) is an American former professional football player who was a linebacker for the Seattle Seahawks of the National Football League (NFL). He played college football for the Miami Hurricanes.
