= Scott Hagler =

American football player (born 1964)

No. 1
- Position: Placekicker

Personal information
- Born: July 19, 1964 (age 62); Eufaula, Alabama, U.S.
- Listed height: 5 ft 8 in (1.73 m)
- Listed weight: 160 lb (73 kg)

Career information
- High school: Dublin (GA)
- College: South Carolina
- NFL draft: 1987: undrafted

Career history
- Seattle Seahawks (1987)

Career NFL statistics
- Field goals made: 2
- Field goals attempted: 2
- Extra points made: 4
- Extra points attempted: 4
- Stats at Pro Football Reference

William Scott Hagler (born July 19, 1964) is an American former professional football player who was a placekicker for one season with the Seattle Seahawks in the National Football League (NFL). He played college football for the South Carolina Gamecocks and was one of the replacement players during the 1987 NFL strike.

== Early life and education ==
Hagler was born on July 19, 1964, in Eufaula, Alabama. He began practicing placekicking at age 10 and was a self-taught "soccer-style" player. He began playing football competitively in eighth grade, and was in addition to kicker a flanker. He attended Dublin High School and began playing exclusively kicker after getting knocked out from a hit while at receiver. Hagler was named All-Middle Georgia as a senior after converting 11-of-15 field goal attempts. He accepted a scholarship from the University of South Carolina (USC) and began attending in 1982, spending his first year as a redshirt.

Hagler first began to see playing time in 1983. In 1984, he helped South Carolina to a 10–2 record and broke the school record of 43 consecutive extra points made. His season was highlighted when he kicked the game-winning point in their win over rival Clemson. Although he had less of a chance for field goals and USC performed more poorly in 1985, Hagler was still able to keep up his string of extra points made, extending it to 80.

Hagler's streak of extra points made ended in week two of 1986 at 82, beginning what was a disappointing season for the senior USC kicker. Soon after, against Virginia Tech, he missed what would have been the game-winning field goal with two seconds left, leading to a 27–27 tie. Five weeks later, in the season finale against Clemson (his final collegiate game), he again missed what would have won the game, resulting in another tie. Hagler graduated from USC with a business degree.

== Professional career ==
After going unselected in the 1987 NFL draft, Hagler was signed by the Seattle Seahawks as an undrafted free agent. He was the kickoff man and handled extra points in two preseason games, but his only field goal attempt was blocked and he was released shortly afterwards as the team already had Pro Bowler Norm Johnson. He was ready to give up on professional football and accepted a position at Pulliam Ford as assistant service manager, but was brought back as a replacement player when the Players Association went on strike. In his debut, against the Miami Dolphins, Hagler kicked a 20-yard field goal and three extra points, (Note: While The Columbia Record reported two extra points, other sources state it was three extra points.) which would be the margin of victory in the 24–20 win. He appeared in one more game, making a 24-yard field goal and posting an extra point in a loss to the Cincinnati Bengals, before being released.

== Later life ==
Hagler later worked for Palmetto Savings Bank and served as senior vice president of Security Federal Bank. He is married and has four children.
