= Jimmy Teal =

American football player (born 1962)

No. 86, 83, 85
- Position: Wide receiver

Personal information
- Born: August 18, 1962 (age 64); Lufkin, Texas, U.S.
- Listed height: 5 ft 10 in (1.78 m)
- Listed weight: 170 lb (77 kg)

Career information
- High school: Diboll (Diboll, Texas)
- College: Texas A&M
- NFL draft: 1985: 5th round, 130th overall pick

Career history
- Buffalo Bills (1985–1986); New Orleans Saints (1987)*; Seattle Seahawks (1987–1988); Miami Dolphins (1988)
- * Offseason or practice squad member only

Career NFL statistics
- Receptions: 21
- Receiving yards: 282
- Touchdowns: 3
- Stats at Pro Football Reference

Jimmy Wayne Teal (born August 18, 1962) is an American former professional football player who was a wide receiver in the National Football League (NFL) for the Buffalo Bills and Seattle Seahawks. He was selected by the Bills in the fifth round of the 1985 NFL draft with the 130th overall pick. He played college football for the Texas A&M Aggies.
