= Kim Mack =

American football player (born 1961)

No. 40
- Position: Cornerback

Personal information
- Born: October 29, 1961 (age 65)
- Listed height: 6 ft 0 in (1.83 m)
- Listed weight: 190 lb (86 kg)

Career information
- High school: Spruce Creek (FL)
- College: Florida State (1980–1984)
- NFL draft: 1985: undrafted

Career history
- Seattle Seahawks (1987)

Career NFL statistics
- Games played: 1
- Stats at Pro Football Reference

Kimbeflu Evanda Mack (born October 29, 1961) is an American former professional football player who was a cornerback for one game with the Seattle Seahawks of the National Football League (NFL) in 1987. He was a replacement player. He played college football for the Florida State Seminoles.
