= Curt Baham =

American football player (born 1963)

No. 38
- Position: Defensive back

Personal information
- Born: March 2, 1963 (age 63); Covington, Louisiana, U.S.
- Listed height: 5 ft 11 in (1.80 m)
- Listed weight: 180 lb (82 kg)

Career information
- High school: Covington
- College: Tulane
- NFL draft: 1987: undrafted

Career history
- Philadelphia Eagles (1987)*; Seattle Seahawks (1987); Dallas Cowboys (1988)*
- * Offseason or practice squad member only

Career NFL statistics
- Games played: 3
- Stats at Pro Football Reference

Roy Curtis Baham (born March 2, 1963) is an American former professional football player who was a defensive back in the National Football League (NFL) for the Seattle Seahawks in 1987. He played college football at Tulane University.

== Early life ==
Baham attended Covington High School, where he practiced football, baseball and track. He accepted a football scholarship from Tulane University.

== Professional career ==
Baham was signed as an undrafted free agent by the Philadelphia Eagles after the 1987 NFL draft. He was waived before the start of the season.

After the NFLPA strike was declared on the third week of the 1987 season, those contests were canceled (reducing the 16-game season to 15) and the NFL decided that the games would be played with replacement players. He was signed to be a part of the Seattle Seahawks replacement team. He played three games while signed with the Seahawks. He was released at the end of the strike in October.

In 1988, he was signed as a free agent by the Dallas Cowboys. He was released on August 8.
