= Joe Jackson (linebacker, born 1962) =

American gridiron football player (born 1962)

No. 53, 54
- Position: Linebacker

Personal information
- Born: October 15, 1962 (age 64); United States
- Listed height: 6 ft 1 in (1.85 m)
- Listed weight: 225 lb (102 kg)

Career information
- High school: Monterey (Monterey, California)
- College: San Francisco State

Career history
- Winnipeg Blue Bombers (1985); Seattle Seahawks (1987)
- Stats at Pro Football Reference

Joseph Loyd Jackson (born October 15, 1962) is an American former professional football linebacker who played for the Seattle Seahawks of the National Football League (NFL) and the Winnipeg Blue Bombers of the Canadian Football League (CFL). He played college football at San Francisco State University.

== Early life and college ==
Joseph Loyd Jackson was born on October 15, 1962, in the United States. He attended Monterey High School in Monterey, California.

Jackson played college football for the San Francisco State Gators of San Francisco State University.

== Professional career ==
Jackson signed with the Winnipeg Blue Bombers of the Canadian Football League (CFL) in 1985. He was released in early July. He was later re-signed in late August but released again several days later. On November 7, 1985, it was reported that Jackson had been signed to a 21-day trial with the Blue Bombers. Overall, he dressed in five games for Winnipeg during the 1985 CFL season, recording one sack, two interceptions, and one fumble recovery. He re-signed with the Blue Bombers in April 1986. On June 12, 1986, it was reported that Jackson had been released.

On September 24, 1987, Jacksons signed with the Seattle Seahawks during the 1987 NFL players strike. He played in three games for the Seahawks before being released on October 19, 1987, after the strike ended.
