= Kevin Juma =

American football player (born 1962)

No. 87
- Position: Wide receiver

Personal information
- Born: July 30, 1962 (age 64); Seattle, Washington, U.S.
- Listed height: 6 ft 2 in (1.88 m)
- Listed weight: 195 lb (88 kg)

Career information
- High school: Fife (Fife, Washington)
- College: Idaho
- NFL draft: 1986: undrafted

Career history
- Seattle Seahawks (1986)*; Seattle Seahawks (1987)*; Hamilton Tiger-Cats (1987)*
- * Offseason or practice squad member only

Career NFL statistics
- Receptions: 7
- Receiving yards: 95
- Stats at Pro Football Reference

Kevin Wade Juma (born July 30, 1962) is an American former professional football wide receiver who played for the Seattle Seahawks of the National Football League (NFL) in 1987.

Juma played college football for two years at Walla Walla Community College before transferring to the University of Idaho. He missed the final four games of the 1984 season with the Idaho Vandals after breaking his foot. In the spring of 1986, Juma received tryouts with the New England Patriots and New York Giants, but ultimately signed with the Seattle Seahawks. He was released in August.

In May 1987, the Seahawks resigned Juma, but he was among the team's final cuts ahead of the regular season.

On September 22, members of the NFL Players Association went on strike, and Seattle resigned Juma. When asked about his position as a non-union replacement player, Juma responded: "I don't want any of [the regulars] to think I'm taking their job. I'm not proud of the fact this is how I got in. I'm not looking at it as a job, it's a chance to be seen to get a job." He briefly left the team after one day of non-union team practice, but quickly rejoined them.

Juma made the Seahawks' final roster to open the 1987 season, and called his first NFL game, a 24-20 win over the Miami Dolphins, "the biggest day of my life so far." Juma appeared in three games for Seattle before the strike ended in October, recording seven receptions for 95 yards with five first downs.

In late October, Juma was signed to the practice roster of the Canadian Football League's Hamilton Tiger-Cats, but he was released in mid-November.
