= Dale Dorning =

American football player (born 1962)

No. 79
- Position: Defensive end

Personal information
- Born: February 7, 1962 (age 64); Burien, Washington, U.S.
- Listed height: 6 ft 5 in (1.96 m)
- Listed weight: 260 lb (118 kg)

Career information
- High school: Federal Way
- College: Oregon
- NFL draft: 1985: undrafted

Career history
- Seattle Seahawks (1987)

Career NFL statistics
- Sacks: 1.5
- Stats at Pro Football Reference

Dale Scott Dorning (born February 7, 1962) is an American former professional football player who was a defensive end for the Seattle Seahawks of the National Football League (NFL). He played college football for the Oregon Ducks.
