= Charles Glaze =

American football player (born 1965)

No. 16
- Position: Cornerback

Personal information
- Born: September 12, 1965 (age 61); Lincolnton, Georgia, U.S.
- Listed height: 5 ft 11 in (1.80 m)
- Listed weight: 200 lb (91 kg)

Career information
- High school: Lincoln County (Lincolnton)
- College: South Carolina State
- NFL draft: 1987: undrafted

Career history
- Seattle Seahawks (1987)
- Stats at Pro Football Reference

Charles Otis Glaze (born September 12, 1965) is an American former professional football player who was a cornerback for the Seattle Seahawks of the National Football League (NFL). He played college football for the South Carolina State Bulldogs.

Pre-draft measurables
Height	Weight	Arm length	Hand span	40-yard dash	10-yard split	20-yard split	20-yard shuttle	Vertical jump
5 ft 11 3/4 in (1.82 m)	197 lb (89 kg)	30 3/4 in (0.78 m)	8 in (0.20 m)	4.50 s	1.57 s	2.62 s	4.50 s	29.5 in (0.75 m)
All values from NFL Combine
