= David Hollis =

American football player (born 1965)

No. 25
- Position: Defensive back

Personal information
- Born: July 4, 1965 (age 61); Harbor City, California, U.S.
- Listed height: 5 ft 11 in (1.80 m)
- Listed weight: 175 lb (79 kg)

Career information
- High school: Gardena (Los Angeles)
- College: UNLV
- NFL draft: 1987: undrafted

Career history
- Seattle Seahawks (1987); Kansas City Chiefs (1988); Seattle Seahawks (1988-1989); Las Vegas Posse (1994); Las Vegas Sting (1995)

Career NFL statistics
- Interceptions: 2
- Kick/Punt return yards: 996
- Stats at Pro Football Reference

David Lanier Hollis (born July 4, 1965) is an American former professional football player who was a defensive back for three seasons in the National Football League (NFL) with the Seattle Seahawks and Kansas City Chiefs. He also played in the Canadian Football League (CFL) for the Las Vegas Posse. He played college football for the UNLV Rebels.
