= M. L. Johnson =

American football player (born 1964)

No. 52
- Position: Linebacker

Personal information
- Born: January 26, 1964 (age 62); New York, New York, U.S.
- Listed height: 6 ft 3 in (1.91 m)
- Listed weight: 228 lb (103 kg)

Career information
- High school: Thomas Jefferson (Los Angeles, California)
- College: Hawaii (1983–1986)
- NFL draft: 1987: 9th round, 243rd overall pick

Career history
- Seattle Seahawks (1987–1989); Green Bay Packers (1990)*
- * Offseason or practice squad member only

Career NFL statistics
- Fumble recoveries: 2
- Stats at Pro Football Reference

Michael Lamar Johnson (born January 26, 1964) is an American former professional football player who was a linebacker for three seasons with the Seattle Seahawks of the National Football League (NFL). He played college football for the Hawaii Rainbow Warriors and was selected by the Seahawks in the ninth round of the 1987 NFL draft.

== Early life and college ==
Michael Lamar Johnson was born on January 26, 1964, in New York, New York. He attended Jefferson High School in Los Angeles, California.

Johnson was a four-year letterman for the Hawaii Rainbow Warriors of the University of Hawaiʻi at Mānoa from 1983 to 1986.

== Professional career ==
Johnson was selected by the Seattle Seahawks in the ninth round, with the 243rd overall pick, of the 1987 NFL draft. He officially signed with the team on July 21. He played in eight games for the Seahawks during the 1987 season. Johnson also appeared in one playoff game that year. He played in all 16 games, starting one, in 1988. He also appeared in a postseason game during the 1988 season. Johnson played in 13 games, starting a career-high eight, in 1989 and recovered two fumbles. He became a free agent after the 1989 season.

Johnson signed with the Green Bay Packers on April 1, 1990. He was released on August 20, 1990.
