= Bruce Mathison =

American football player (born 1959)

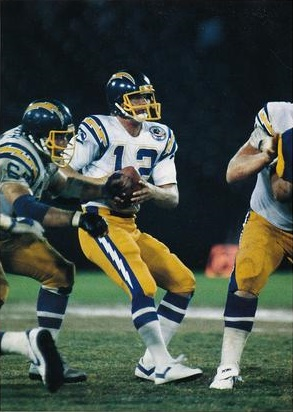
- Mathison in 1984

No. 12, 7, 11
- Position: Quarterback

Personal information
- Born: April 25, 1959 (age 67); Superior, Wisconsin, U.S.
- Listed height: 6 ft 3 in (1.91 m)
- Listed weight: 205 lb (93 kg)

Career information
- High school: Superior
- College: Nebraska
- NFL draft: 1983: 10th round, 272nd overall pick

Career history
- San Diego Chargers (1983–1984); Buffalo Bills (1985); San Diego Chargers (1986); Los Angeles Raiders (1987)*; Houston Oilers (1987)*; Seattle Seahawks (1987), (1988)
- * Offseason or practice squad member only

Career NFL statistics
- Passing attempts: 309
- Passing completions: 152
- Completion percentage: 49.2%
- TD–INT: 7–20
- Passing yards: 2,177
- Passer rating: 53
- Stats at Pro Football Reference

Bruce Martin Mathison (born April 25, 1959) is an American former professional football player who was a quarterback in the National Football League (NFL). He played college football for the Nebraska Cornhuskers. He was selected by the San Diego Chargers in the 10th round (272nd overall) of the 1983 NFL Draft. He played in the NFL for the San Diego Chargers (two stints), Buffalo Bills, and as a replacement player for the Seattle Seahawks during the 1987 strike season.
