= Ruben Rodriguez (American football) =

American football player (1965–2026)

No. 5, 8, 4
- Position: Punter

Personal information
- Born: March 3, 1965; Visalia, California, U.S.
- Died: February 3, 2026 (aged 60); Hanford, California, U.S.
- Listed weight: 214 lb (97 kg)

Career information
- High school: Woodlake Union (Woodlake, California)
- College: Arizona
- NFL draft: 1987: 5th round, 131st overall pick

Career history
- Seattle Seahawks (1987–1989); San Diego Chargers (1991)*; Phoenix Cardinals (1992)*; Denver Broncos (1992); New York Giants (1992)
- * Offseason or practice squad member only

Awards and highlights
- PFWA All-Rookie Team (1987)

Career NFL statistics
- Punts: 238
- Punt yards: 9,640
- Longest punt: 68
- Stats at Pro Football Reference

Ruben Angel Rodriguez (March 3, 1965 – February 3, 2026) was an American professional football player who was a punter in the National Football League (NFL). He played for the Seattle Seahawks, Denver Broncos and New York Giants. He was selected 131st overall by the Seahawks in the fifth round of the 1987 NFL draft. He played college football for the Arizona Wildcats. He was of Mexican American descent. Rodriguez died in Hanford, California, on February 3, 2026, at the age of 60.
