= Stan Eisenhooth =

American football player (born 1963)

No. 66, 67
- Positions: Center, tackle

Personal information
- Born: July 8, 1963 (age 63); Harrisburg, Pennsylvania, U.S.
- Listed height: 6 ft 5 in (1.96 m)
- Listed weight: 287 lb (130 kg)

Career information
- High school: Wingate (PA) Bald Eagle Area
- College: Towson
- NFL draft: 1986: undrafted

Career history
- Seattle Seahawks (1986–1988); Indianapolis Colts (1989); Seattle Seahawks (1991)*
- * Offseason or practice squad member only

Career NFL statistics
- Games played: 29
- Stats at Pro Football Reference

Stanley Emerson Eisenhooth (born July 8, 1963) is an American former professional football player who was a center and tackle in the National Football League (NFL). He played for the Seattle Seahawks in 1988 and for the Indianapolis Colts in 1989. He played college football for the Towson Tigers.
