= 1978 Seattle Seahawks season =

American football team season

- Owner: The Nordstrom family
- General manager: John Thompson
- Head coach: Jack Patera
- Home stadium: Kingdome

Results
- Record: 9–7
- Division place: 3rd AFC West
- Playoffs: Did not qualify
- All-Pros: QB Jim Zorn (2nd team); WR Steve Largent (2nd team)
- Pro Bowlers: WR Steve Largent

The 1978 Seattle Seahawks season was the team's third season in the National Football League (NFL). The Seahawks won nine games, giving the franchise its first winning season. Head coach Jack Patera won NFL Coach of the Year and general manager John Thompson was named NFL Executive of the Year at seasons end.

Led by the third ranked offense, the team had some achievements. David Sims led the AFC in total touchdowns – 15, including 14 rushing – and the team had 28 rushing touchdowns, number two in the league. Steve Largent made his first Pro Bowl with 71 receptions and 8 touchdowns. Quarterback Jim Zorn earned his sole All-Pro honor of his career by making the second team. This would be the only All-Pro by a Seahawks quarterback until Russell Wilson was selected in 2019. The defense, however, lagged far behind ranking 26th.

Season highlights included defeating the Oakland Raiders twice and a last-second win over the Minnesota Vikings. Also a memorable game was a 20–17 loss in overtime to the Denver Broncos. Following an interception of a Jim Zorn pass off of a deflection, in overtime, the Broncos drove to the 1 yard line, but could not punch it in for a touchdown. Jim Turner missed an 18-yard field goal attempt, but the Seahawks were penalized for having 12 men on the field and the Broncos made the second kick. A 37–10 defeat in San Diego in week 15 eliminated the Seahawks from playoff contention, but a 23–19 win at home against Kansas City gave the team their first winning season.

== Offseason ==
=== Draft ===
1978 Seattle Seahawks draft
| Round | Pick | Player | Position | College | Notes |
| 1 | 9 | Keith Simpson | Cornerback | Memphis State | |
| 2 | 36 | Keith Butler | Linebacker | Memphis State | |
| 3 | 63 | Bob Jury | Cornerback | Pittsburgh | |
| 5 | 119 | Louis Bullard | Offensive tackle | Jackson State | |
| 6 | 146 | Glenn Starks | Wide receiver | Texas A&I | |
| 7 | 173 | John Harris | Safety | Arizona State | |
| 9 | 231 | Rich Grimmett | Offensive tackle | Illinois | |
| 10 | 258 | Rob Stewart | Wide Receiver | Lafayette | |
| 11 | 301 | George Halas | Linebacker | Miami (FL) | |
| 12 | 316 | Jeff Bergeron | Running back | Lamar | |
Made roster

=== Undrafted free agents ===
1978 undrafted free agents of note
| Player | Position | College |
|---|---|---|
| Jerome Carter | Cornerback | Delaware State |
| Jon Clemons | Guard | Arkansas Tech |
| Rufus Crawford | Running back | Virginia State |
| Gene Dales | Linebacker | Oregon State |
| Tim Eberle | Linebacker | Canisius |
| Rickey Ellis | Wide receiver | Cal State Fullerton |
| Steve Fefer | Defensive tackle | Texas A&I |
| Lance Garrett | Wide receiver | South Carolina |
| Elton Gross | Tight end | Guilford |
| Marcus Hatley | Tight end | Tulsa |
| Kerry Justin | Cornerback | Oregon State |
| Trever Kennerd | Kicker | Northern Alberta |
| Mike Korvas | Punter | Weber State |
| Rob Lowe | Kicker/Punter | Idaho |
| Bill McCadden | Safety | Cal Poly |
| Steve Midboe | Defensive end | Minnesota |
| Chris Moore | Defensive end | Virginia State |
| Mike O'Brien | Safety | California |
| Tim Ochs | Guard | Washington State |
| Scott Palmer | Quarterback | Anderson |
| Brian Peets | Tight end | Pacific |
| Jeff Salta | Fullback | Portland State |
| Rich Sorenson | Kicker | Chico State |
| Mark Stefl | Defensive end | Long Beach State |
| Frank Stephens | Safety | UCLA |
| Howard Studdard | Wide receiver | USC |
| Skip Taylor | Running back | Oklahoma State |
| Jeff Tisdel | Quarterback | Nevada |
| Bruce Timmier | Quarterback | Trinity |
| Joe Volinsky | Defensive end | Penn State |

== Personnel ==
=== Staff ===
1978 Seattle Seahawks staff
| **Front office**: Managing general partner – Herman Sarkowsky; general manager – John Thompson; Assistant general manager – Mark Duncan; Director of player personnel – Dick Mansperger; Director of pro scouting – Chuck Allen; **Head coaches**: Head coach – Jack Patera; **Offensive coaches**: Offensive/quarterbacks/receivers – Jerry Rhome; Offensive backs – Andy MacDonald; Offensive line – Howard Mudd | **Defensive coaches**: Defensive/linebackers – Larry Peccatiello; Defensive line – Jim E. Mora; Defensive backs – Jack Christiansen; **Strength and conditioning**: Head trainer – Bruce Scott; Assistant trainer – Jim Whitesel |

=== Final roster ===
1978 Seattle Seahawks roster
| **Quarterbacks (QB)**: 12 Sam Adkins; 16 Steve Myer; **10** Jim Zorn; **Running backs (RB)**: 31 Tony Benjamin; 34 Rufus Crawford; 24 Al Hunter; **47** Sherman Smith; 42 Don Testerman; **Wide receivers (WR)**: 89 Duke Fergerson; **80** Steve Largent; **84** Sam McCullum; 83 Steve Raible; **Tight ends (TE)**: **87** Ron Howard; 88 Brian Peets; 81 John Sawyer | **Offensive linemen (OL)**: 64 Charles Aiu G; **76** Steve August T; **63** Nick Bebout T; 72 Louis Bullard T; 73 Norm Evans T; 54 Art Kuehn C; **61** Tom Lynch G; **78** Bob Newton G; **Defensive linemen (DL)**: **68** Dennis Boyd DT; **77** Bill Gregory DE; 70 Dave Kraayeveld DE; 71 Steve Niehaus DT; **62** Ernie Price DE; **66** Bill Sandifer DT/DE | **Linebackers (LB)**: **58** Terry Beeson MLB; **53** Keith Butler OLB; 57 Peter Cronan MLB; 36 Ken Geddes OLB; **56** Sammy Green OLB; 59 Charles McShane OLB; **Defensive backs (DB)**: **27** Autry Beamon SS; **22** Dave Brown CB; **44** John Harris FS; 26 Kerry Justin CB; 23 Doug Long FS; 48 Keith Simpson CB; **38** Cornell Webster CB; **Special teams (ST)**: 1 Efrén Herrera K; 3 John Leypoldt K; 18 Herman Weaver P | **Reserve**: 60 Ron Coder G (IR); 25 Don Dufek S (IR); 91 George Halas LB (Left squad); 85 Marcus Hatley TE (IR); 64 Gordon Jolley T (IR); 9 Mike Korves P (IR); **35** David Sims RB (IR); **51** John Yarno C (IR); Rookies in italics 45 active, 8 reserve |

- Starters in bold.
- (*) Denotes players that were selected for the 1979 Pro Bowl.

== Schedule ==
=== Preseason ===
| Week | Date | Opponent | Result | Record | Venue | Recap |
|---|---|---|---|---|---|---|
| 1 | August 4 | San Diego Chargers | **W** 17–9 | 1–0 | Kingdome | Recap |
| 2 | August 12 | at San Francisco 49ers | **W** 20–6 | 2–0 | Candlestick Park | Recap |
| 3 | August 17 | Los Angeles Rams | **L** 7–26 | 2–1 | Kingdome | Recap |
| 4 | August 24 | Chicago Bears | **W** 16–7 | 3–1 | Kingdome | Recap |

Source: Seahawks Media Guides

=== Regular season ===
With the start of a 16-game season, inter-conference play began a rotating schedule. Divisional matchups had the AFC West playing the NFC Central.

| Week | Date | Opponent | Result | Record | Venue | Recap |
|---|---|---|---|---|---|---|
| 1 | September 3 | **San Diego Chargers** | **L** 20–24 | 0–1 | Kingdome | Recap |
| 2 | September 10 | at Pittsburgh Steelers | **L** 10–21 | 0–2 | Three Rivers Stadium | Recap |
| 3 | September 17 | at New York Jets | **W** 24–17 | 1–2 | Shea Stadium | Recap |
| 4 | September 24 | Detroit Lions | **W** 28–16 | 2–2 | Kingdome | Recap |
| 5 | October 1 | at **Denver Broncos** | **L** 7–28 | 2–3 | Mile High Stadium | Recap |
| 6 | October 8 | Minnesota Vikings | **W** 29–28 | 3–3 | Kingdome | Recap |
| 7 | October 15 | at Green Bay Packers | **L** 28–45 | 3–4 | Milwaukee County Stadium | Recap |
| 8 | October 22 | **Oakland Raiders** | **W** 27–7 | 4–4 | Kingdome | Recap |
| 9 | October 29 | **Denver Broncos** | **L** 17–20 ^{(OT)} | 4–5 | Kingdome | Recap |
| 10 | November 5 | at Chicago Bears | **W** 31–29 | 5–5 | Soldier Field | Recap |
| 11 | November 12 | Baltimore Colts | **L** 14–17 | 5–6 | Kingdome | Recap |
| 12 | November 19 | at **Kansas City Chiefs** | **W** 13–10 | 6–6 | Arrowhead Stadium | Recap |
| 13 | November 26 | at **Oakland Raiders** | **W** 17–16 | 7–6 | Oakland–Alameda County Coliseum | Recap |
| 14 | December 3 | Cleveland Browns | **W** 47–24 | 8–6 | Kingdome | Recap |
| 15 | December 10 | at **San Diego Chargers** | **L** 10–37 | 8–7 | San Diego Stadium | Recap |
| 16 | December 17 | **Kansas City Chiefs** | **W** 23–19 | 9–7 | Kingdome | Recap |
Note: Intra-division opponents are in **bold** text.

Source: 1978 NFL season results

== Standings ==
AFC West
| | W | L | T | PCT | DIV | CONF | PF | PA | STK |
|---|---|---|---|---|---|---|---|---|---|
| ^{(3)} Denver Broncos | 10 | 6 | 0 | .625 | 7–1 | 8–4 | 282 | 198 | L1 |
| Oakland Raiders | 9 | 7 | 0 | .563 | 3–5 | 5–7 | 311 | 283 | W1 |
| Seattle Seahawks | 9 | 7 | 0 | .563 | 4–4 | 6–6 | 345 | 358 | W1 |
| San Diego Chargers | 9 | 7 | 0 | .563 | 5–3 | 7–5 | 355 | 309 | W3 |
| Kansas City Chiefs | 4 | 12 | 0 | .250 | 1–7 | 4–10 | 243 | 327 | L2 |

== Game summaries ==
=== Preseason ===
==== Week P1: vs. San Diego Chargers ====
Preseason Week One: Seattle Seahawks vs. San Diego Chargers – Game summary

| Quarter | 1 | 2 | 3 | 4 | Total |
|---|---|---|---|---|---|
| Chargers | 0 | 3 | 3 | 3 | 9 |
| Seahawks | 0 | 7 | 3 | 7 | 17 |

at Kingdome, Seattle

- Date: August 4
- Game time: 7:33 pm local
- Game weather: indoors
- Game attendance: 58,853
- Referee: Pat Haggerty
- TV: KIRO tape delay
- Gamebook

==== Week P2: at San Francisco 49ers ====
Preseason Week Two: Seattle Seahawks at San Francisco 49ers – Game summary

| Quarter | 1 | 2 | 3 | 4 | Total |
|---|---|---|---|---|---|
| Seahawks | 0 | 13 | 7 | 0 | 20 |
| 49ers | 0 | 3 | 3 | 0 | 6 |

at Candlestick Park, San Francisco

- Date: August 12
- Game time: 6:06 pm local
- Game weather: cloudy, 61 °F (16 °C), 77% humidity, wind S 4 miles per hour (6.4 km/h)
- Game attendance: 36,069
- Referee: Fred Silva
- TV: KIRO
- Gamebook

==== Week P3: vs. Los Angeles Rams ====
Preseason Week Three: Seattle Seahawks vs. Los Angeles Rams – Game summary

| Quarter | 1 | 2 | 3 | 4 | Total |
|---|---|---|---|---|---|
| Rams | 10 | 6 | 7 | 3 | 26 |
| Seahawks | 0 | 7 | 0 | 0 | 7 |

at Kingdome, Seattle

- Date: August 17
- Game time: 7:34 pm local
- Game weather: indoors
- Game attendance: 63,235
- Referee: Cal Lepore
- TV: KIRO tape delay
- Gamebook

==== Week P4: vs. Chicago Bears ====
Preseason Week Four: Seattle Seahawks vs. Chicago Bears – Game summary

| Quarter | 1 | 2 | 3 | 4 | Total |
|---|---|---|---|---|---|
| Bears | 0 | 0 | 0 | 7 | 7 |
| Seahawks | 0 | 7 | 3 | 6 | 16 |

at Kingdome, Seattle

- Date: August 24
- Game time: 7:35 pm local
- Game weather: indoors
- Game attendance: 54,844
- Referee: Red Cashion
- TV: KIRO tape delay
- Gamebook

=== Regular season ===
==== Week 1: vs. San Diego Chargers ====
Week One: Seattle Seahawks vs. San Diego Chargers – Game summary

| Quarter | 1 | 2 | 3 | 4 | Total |
|---|---|---|---|---|---|
| Chargers | 7 | 3 | 7 | 7 | 24 |
| Seahawks | 6 | 7 | 0 | 7 | 20 |

at Kingdome, Seattle

- Date: September 3
- Game time: 1:07 pm local
- Game weather: indoors
- Game attendance: 55,778
- Referee: Dick Jorgensen
- TV announcers (NBC): Stu Nahan and Paul Maguire
- Gamebook

Game information

First quarter

- SEA – Sherman Smith 64-yard pass from Jim Zorn (PAT failed), 12:02 (SEA 6–0)
- SD – John Jefferson 29-yard pass from Dan Fouts (Rolf Benirschke kick), 2:24 (SD 7–6)

Second quarter

- SD – Rolf Benirschke 18-yard field goal, 3:21 (SD 10–6)
- SEA – Jim Zorn 23-yard run (Efrén Herrera kick), 0:16 (SEA 13–10)

Third quarter

- SD – John Jefferson 6-yard pass from Dan Fouts (Rolf Benirschke kick), 11:23 (SD 17–13)

Fourth quarter

- SD – Gary Johnson 52-yard interception return (Rolf Benirschke kick), 10:49 (SD 24–13)
- SEA – Steve Largent 33-yard pass from Jim Zorn (Efrén Herrera kick), 0:06 (SD 24–20)

Top passers

- SD – Dan Fouts: 14/22, 186 yds, 2 TD, 1 INT
- SEA – Jim Zorn: 21/32, 329 yds, 2 TD, 1 INT

Top rushers

- SD – Bo Matthews: 10 car, 49 yds
- SEA – David Sims: 18 car, 61 yds

Top receivers

- SD – Don Woods: 7 rec, 77 yds
- SEA – Steve Largent: 6 rec, 127 yds, 1 TD

Team – pass – rush – total – to

- SD – 186 – 89 – 275 – 2
- SEA – 308 – 138 – 446 – 2

==== Week 2: at Pittsburgh Steelers ====
Week Two: Seattle Seahawks at Pittsburgh Steelers – Game summary

| Quarter | 1 | 2 | 3 | 4 | Total |
|---|---|---|---|---|---|
| Seahawks | 0 | 7 | 3 | 0 | 10 |
| Steelers | 0 | 14 | 0 | 7 | 21 |

at Three Rivers Stadium, Pittsburgh, Pennsylvania

- Date: September 10
- Game time: 1:00 pm local
- Game weather: cloudy, 78 °F (26 °C), 78% humidity, wind S 4 miles per hour (6.4 km/h)
- Game attendance: 48,277
- Referee: Jim Tunney
- TV announcers (NBC): Sam Nover and Mike Haffner
- Gamebook

Game information

First quarter

- PIT – Lynn Swann 4-yard pass from Terry Bradshaw (Roy Gerela kick), 14:10 (PIT 7–0)
- PIT – Sidney Thornton 20-yard pass from Terry Bradshaw (Roy Gerela kick), 8:41 (PIT 14–0)

Second quarter

- SEA – David Sims 1-yard run (Efrén Herrera kick), 4:32 (PIT 14–7)

Third quarter

- SEA – Efrén Herrera 20-yard field goal, 6:48 (PIT 14–10)

Fourth quarter

- PIT – Franco Harris 1-yard run (Roy Gerela kick), 14:19 (PIT 21–10)

Top passers

- SEA – Jim Zorn: 11/22, 174 yds, 1 INT
- PIT – Terry Bradshaw: 17/32, 213 yds, 2 TD

Top rushers

- SEA – Al Hunter: 10 car, 37 yds
- PIT – Franco Harris: 18 car, 64 yds, 1 TD

Top receivers

- SEA – Steve Largent: 4 rec, 88 yds
- PIT – Lynn Swann: 6 rec, 65 yds, 1 TD

Team – pass – rush – total – to

- SEA – 154 – 93 – 247 – 3
- PIT – 185 – 151 – 336 – 1

==== Week 3: at New York Jets ====
Week Three: Seattle Seahawks at New York Jets – Game summary

| Quarter | 1 | 2 | 3 | 4 | Total |
|---|---|---|---|---|---|
| Seahawks | 0 | 14 | 3 | 7 | 24 |
| Jets | 7 | 7 | 3 | 0 | 17 |

at Shea Stadium, New York

- Date: September 17
- Game time: 1:03 pm local
- Game weather: clear, 71 °F (22 °C), 66% humidity, wind NW 7 miles per hour (11 km/h)
- Game attendance: 46,911
- Referee: Gordon McCarter
- TV announcers (NBC): Marv Albert and Bob Trumpy
- Gamebook

Game information

First quarter

- NYJ – Clark Gaines 1-yard run (Pat Leahy kick), 9:51 (NYJ 7–0)

Second quarter

- SEA – David Sims 3-yard run (Efrén Herrera kick), 13:19 (Tied 7–7)
- NYJ – Clark Gaines 5-yard run (Pat Leahy kick), 7:58 (NYJ 14–7)
- SEA – David Sims 2-yard run (Efrén Herrera kick), 4:01 (Tied 14–14)

Third quarter

- SEA – Efrén Herrera 45-yard field goal, 8:33 (SEA 17–14)
- NYJ – Pat Leahy 37-yard field goal, 1:57 (Tied 17–17)

Fourth quarter

- SEA – David Sims 3-yard run (Efrén Herrera kick), 10:20 (SEA 24–17)

Top passers

- SEA – Jim Zorn: 19/26, 191 yds, 1 INT
- NYJ – Richard Todd: 13/24, 220 yds, 3 INT

Top rushers

- SEA – David Sims: 23 car, 121 yds, 3 TD
- NYJ – Kevin Long: 16 car, 80 yds

Top receivers

- SEA – Al Hunter: 4 rec, 62 yds
- NYJ – Derrick Gaffney: 3 rec, 74 yds

Team – pass – rush – total – to

- SEA – 181 – 153 – 334 – 2
- NYJ – 201 – 177 – 378 – 3

==== Week 4: vs. Detroit Lions ====
Week Four: Seattle Seahawks vs. Detroit Lions – Game summary

| Quarter | 1 | 2 | 3 | 4 | Total |
|---|---|---|---|---|---|
| Lions | 3 | 3 | 10 | 0 | 16 |
| Seahawks | 0 | 7 | 0 | 21 | 28 |

at Kingdome, Seattle

- Date: September 24
- Game time: 1:04 pm local
- Game weather: indoors
- Game attendance: 60,040
- Referee: Jerry Markbreit
- TV announcers (CBS): Frank Glieber and Bill Mazer
- Gamebook

Game information

First quarter

- DET – Benny Ricardo 44-yard field goal, 11:05(DET 3–0)

Second quarter

- DET – Benny Ricardo 35-yard field goal, 12:00 (DET 6–0)
- SEA – Jim Zorn 5-yard run (Efrén Herrera kick), 1:10 (SEA 7–6)

Third quarter

- DET – Benny Ricardo 29-yard field goal, 9:53 (DET 9–7)
- DET – Dexter Bussey 29-yard run (Benny Ricardo kick), 0:58 (DET 16–7)

Fourth quarter

- SEA – Steve Largent 40-yard pass from Jim Zorn (Efrén Herrera kick), 12:34 (DET 16–14)
- SEA – Ron Howard 4-yard pass from Jim Zorn (Efrén Herrera kick), 9:17 (SEA 21–16)
- SEA – Sam McCullum 12-yard pass from Jim Zorn (Efrén Herrera kick), 2:30 (SEA 28–16)

Top passers

- DET – Greg Landry: 16/26, 155 yds
- SEA – Jim Zorn: 12/17, 189 yds, 3 TD, 1 INT

Top rushers

- DET – Dexter Bussey: 20 car, 120 yds, 1 TD
- SEA – David Sims: 15 car, 48 yds

Top receivers

- DET – Horace King: 5 rec, 50 yds
- SEA – Steve Largent: 4 rec, 85 yds, 1 TD

Team – pass – rush – total – to

- DET – 129 – 132 – 261 – 0
- SEA – 158 – 87 – 245 – 1

==== Week 5: at Denver Broncos ====
Week Five: Seattle Seahawks at Denver Broncos – Game summary

| Quarter | 1 | 2 | 3 | 4 | Total |
|---|---|---|---|---|---|
| Seahawks | 0 | 0 | 7 | 0 | 7 |
| Broncos | 7 | 7 | 0 | 14 | 28 |

at Mile High Stadium, Denver, Colorado

- Date: October 1
- Game time: 2:00 pm local
- Game weather: partly cloudy, 82 °F (28 °C), 23% humidity, wind 5 miles per hour (8.0 km/h)
- Game attendance: 74,989
- Referee: Cal Lepore
- TV announcers (NBC): Jay Randolph and Mike Haffner
- Gamebook

Game information

First quarter

- DEN – Norris Weese 6-yard run (Jim Turner kick), 6:30 (DEN 7–0)

Second quarter

- DEN – Jon Keyworth 9-yard pass from Norris Weese (Jim Turner kick), 7:26 (DEN 14–0)

Third quarter

- SEA – David Sims 6-yard run (Efrén Herrera kick), 9:17 (DEN 14–7)

Fourth quarter

- DEN – Larry Canada 9-yard run (Jim Turner kick), 7:39 (DEN 21–7)
- DEN – Dave Preston 30-yard pass from Craig Penrose (Jim Turner kick), 3:05 (DEN 28–7)

Top passers

- SEA – Jim Zorn: 24/38, 218 yds, 3 INT
- DEN – Norris Weese: 14/21, 161 yds, 1 TD, 3 INT

Top rushers

- SEA – David Sims: 10 car, 45 yds, 1 TD
- DEN – Lonnie Perrin: 7 car, 65 yds

Top receivers

- SEA – Steve Raible: 3 rec, 49 yds
- DEN – Riley Odoms: 3 rec, 45 yds

Team – pass – rush – total – to

- SEA – 231 – 92 – 323 – 5
- DEN – 169 – 204 – 373 – 3

==== Week 6: vs. Minnesota Vikings ====
Week Six: Seattle Seahawks vs. Minnesota Vikings – Game summary

| Quarter | 1 | 2 | 3 | 4 | Total |
|---|---|---|---|---|---|
| Vikings | 0 | 14 | 14 | 0 | 28 |
| Seahawks | 13 | 6 | 0 | 10 | 29 |

at Kingdome, Seattle

- Date: October 8
- Game time: 1:03 pm local
- Game weather: indoors
- Game attendance: 62,031
- Referee: Fred Silva
- TV announcers (CBS): Vin Scully, George Allen and Jim Brown
- Gamebook

Game information

First quarter

- SEA – Sam McCullum 44-yard pass from Jim Zorn (PAT failed), 9:47 (SEA 6–0)
- SEA – Jim Zorn 12-yard run (Efrén Herrera kick), 0:59 (SEA 13–0)

Second quarter

- MIN – Ahmad Rashad 2-yard pass from Fran Tarkenton (Rick Danmeier kick), 8:57 (SEA 13–7)
- SEA – David Sims 8-yard run (PAT failed), 0:40 (SEA 19–7)
- MIN – Fran Tarkenton 1-yard run (Rick Danmeier kick), 0:04 (SEA 19–14)

Third quarter

- MIN – Robert Miller 5-yard run (Rick Danmeier kick), 6:41 (MIN 21–19)
- MIN – Sammy White 9-yard pass from Fran Tarkenton (Rick Danmeier kick), 0:59 (MIN 28–19)

Fourth quarter

- SEA – Jim Zorn 22-yard run (Efrén Herrera kick), 9:02 (MIN 28–26)
- SEA – Efrén Herrera 19-yard field goal, 0:00 (SEA 29–28)

Top passers

- MIN – Fran Tarkenton: 27/37, 274 yds, 2 TD
- SEA – Jim Zorn: 17/28, 256 yds, 1 TD, 2 INT

Top rushers

- MIN – Robert Miller: 20 car, 64 yds, 1 TD
- SEA – Sherman Smith: 16 car, 74 yds

Top receivers

- MIN – Robert Miller: 4 rec, 58 yds
- SEA – Sam McCullum: 5 rec, 98 yds, 1 TD

Team – pass – rush – total – to

- MIN – 274 – 117 – 391 – 1
- SEA – 248 – 184 – 432 – 2

==== Week 7: at Green Bay Packers ====
Week Seven: Seattle Seahawks at Green Bay Packers – Game summary

| Quarter | 1 | 2 | 3 | 4 | Total |
|---|---|---|---|---|---|
| Seahawks | 0 | 14 | 7 | 7 | 28 |
| Packers' | 28 | 3 | 14 | 0 | 45 |

at Milwaukee County Stadium, Milwaukee, Wisconsin

- Date: October 15
- Game time: 12:00 pm local
- Game weather: cloudy, 42 °F (6 °C), 87% humidity, wind S 14 miles per hour (23 km/h)
- Game attendance: 52,712
- Referee: Chuck Heberling
- TV announcers (NBC): Sam Nover and Bob Trumpy
- Gamebook

Game information

First quarter

- GB – Steve Odom 95-yard kickoff return (Chester Marcol kick), 14:44 (GB 7–0)
- GB – James Lofton 24-yard pass from David Whitehurst (Chester Marcol kick), 13:04 (GB 14–0)
- GB – Terdell Middleton 5-yard run (Chester Marcol kick), 2:56 (GB 21–0)
- GB – Terdell Middleton 14-yard run (Chester Marcol kick), 1:33 (GB 28–0)

Second quarter

- SEA – Jim Zorn 12-yard run (Efrén Herrera kick), 13:06 (GB 28–7)
- SEA – Steve Largent 48-yard pass from Jim Zorn (Efrén Herrera kick), 11:38 (GB 28–14)
- GB – Chester Marcol 22-yard field goal, 6:32 (GB 31–14)

Third quarter

- GB – Terdell Middleton 2-yard run (Chester Marcol kick), 11:51 (GB 38–14)
- SEA – Sherman Smith 9-yard run (Efrén Herrera kick), 9:04 (GB 38–21)
- GB – Terdell Middleton 9-yard run (Chester Marcol kick), 4:35 (GB 45–21)

Fourth quarter

- SEA – David Sims 2-yard run (Efrén Herrera kick), 10:23 (GB 45–28)

Top passers

- SEA – Jim Zorn: 17/31, 308 yds, 1 TD, 2 INT
- GB – David Whitehurst: 12/19, 179 yds, 1 TD, 1 INT

Top rushers

- SEA – David Sims: 22 car, 104 yds, 1 TD
- GB – Terdell Middleton: 23 car, 121 yds, 4 TD

Top receivers

- SEA – Steve Largent: 6 rec, 127 yds, 1 TD
- GB – James Lofton: 5 rec, 98 yds, 1 TD

Team – pass – rush – total – to

- SEA – 289 – 194 – 483 – 7
- GB – 179 – 190 – 369 – 3

==== Week 8: vs. Oakland Raiders ====
Week Eight: Seattle Seahawks vs. Oakland Raiders – Game summary

| Quarter | 1 | 2 | 3 | 4 | Total |
|---|---|---|---|---|---|
| Raiders | 0 | 0 | 0 | 7 | 7 |
| Seahawks | 7 | 14 | 6 | 0 | 27 |

at Kingdome, Seattle

- Date: October 22
- Game time: 1:00 pm local
- Game weather: indoors
- Game attendance: 62,529
- Referee: Don Wedge
- TV announcers (NBC): Charlie Jones and Len Dawson
- Gamebook

Game information

First quarter

- SEA – David Sims 2-yard run (Efrén Herrera kick), 2:37 (SEA 7–0)

Second quarter

- SEA – Sherman Smith 2-yard run (Efrén Herrera kick), 7:33 (SEA 14–0)
- SEA – Sherman Smith 1-yard run (Efrén Herrera kick), 0:07 (SEA 21–0)

Third quarter

- SEA – Efrén Herrera 42-yard field goal, 2:16 (SEA 24–0)
- SEA – Efrén Herrera 32-yard field goal, 0:36 (SEA 27–0)

Fourth quarter

- OAK – Cliff Branch 22-yard pass from Ken Stabler (Errol Mann kick), 4:57 (SEA 27–7)

Top passers

- OAK – Ken Stabler: 19/30, 204 yds, 1 TD, 4 INT
- SEA – Jim Zorn: 11/21, 144 yds, 1 INT

Top rushers

- OAK – Mark van Eeghen: 7 car, 26 yds
- SEA – Sherman Smith: 17 car, 63 yds, 2 TD

Top receivers

- OAK – Cliff Branch: 6 rec, 84 yds, 1 TD
- SEA – Steve Largent: 4 rec, 67 yds

Team – pass – rush – total – to

- OAK – 177 – 70 – 247 – 4
- SEA – 170 – 204 – 374 – 1

==== Week 9: vs. Denver Broncos ====
Week One: Seattle Seahawks vs. Denver Broncos – Game summary

| Quarter | 1 | 2 | 3 | 4 | OT | Total |
|---|---|---|---|---|---|---|
| Broncos | 3 | 7 | 7 | 0 | 3 | 20 |
| Seahawks | 7 | 7 | 0 | 3 | 0 | 17 |

at Kingdome, Seattle

- Date: October 29
- Game time: 1:04 pm local
- Game weather: indoors
- Game attendance: 62,948
- Referee: Gordon McCarter
- TV announcers (NBC): Curt Gowdy and John Brodie
- Gamebook

Game information

First quarter

- DEN – Jim Turner 34-yard field goal, 9:47 (DEN 3–0)
- SEA – Sam McCullum 44-yard pass from Jim Zorn (Efrén Herrera kick), 7:13 (SEA 7–3)

Second quarter

- SEA – Jim Zorn 4-yard run (Efrén Herrera kick), 13:09 (SEA 14–3)
- DEN – Rick Upchurch 29-yard pass from Craig Morton (Jim Turner kick), 3:28 (SEA 14–10)

Third quarter

- DEN – Lonnie Perrin 1-yard run (Jim Turner kick), 5:46 (DEN 17–14)

Fourth quarter

- SEA – Efrén Herrera 37-yard field goal, 1:53 (Tied 17–17)

Overtime

- DEN – Jim Turner 18-yard field goal, 2:01 (DEN 20–17)

Top passers

- DEN – Craig Morton: 11/28, 155 yds, 1 TD
- SEA – Jim Zorn: 9/29, 110 yds, 1 TD, 3 INT

Top rushers

- DEN – Jon Keyworth: 8 car, 70 yds
- SEA – Sherman Smith: 17 car, 73 yds

Top receivers

- DEN – Haven Moses: 3 rec, 80 yds
- SEA – Sam McCullum: 3 rec, 57 yds, 1 TD

Team – pass – rush – total – to

- DEN – 145 – 278 – 423 – 3
- SEA – 140 – 118 – 258 – 5

==== Week 10: at Chicago Bears ====
Week Ten: Seattle Seahawks at Chicago Bears – Game summary

| Quarter | 1 | 2 | 3 | 4 | Total |
|---|---|---|---|---|---|
| Seahawks | 7 | 7 | 14 | 3 | 31 |
| Bears | 0 | 6 | 10 | 13 | 29 |

at Soldier Field, Chicago, Illinois

- Date: November 5
- Game time: 12:01 pm local
- Game weather: clear, 71 °F (22 °C), 74% humidity, wind S 16 miles per hour (26 km/h)
- Game attendance: 50,697
- Referee: Pat Haggerty
- TV announcers (NBC): Curt Gowdy and John Brodie
- Gamebook

Game information

First quarter

- SEA – Sherman Smith 1-yard run (Efrén Herrera kick), 2:59 (SEA 7–0)

Second quarter

- CHI – Bob Thomas 33-yard field goal, 1:22 (SEA 7–3)
- SEA – Steve Largent 26-yard pass from Jim Zorn (Efrén Herrera kick), 0:31 (SEA 14–3)
- CHI – Bob Thomas 36-yard field goal, 0:01 (SEA 14–6)

Third quarter

- CHI – Bob Thomas 39-yard field goal, 11:04 (SEA 14–9)
- SEA – Steve Largent 31-yard pass from Jim Zorn (Efrén Herrera kick), 8:14 (SEA 21–9)
- CHI – Roland Harper 20-yard pass from Mike Phipps (Bob Thomas kick), 1:38 (SEA 21–16)
- SEA – Sherman Smith 6-yard run (Efrén Herrera kick), 1:03 (SEA 28–16)

Fourth quarter

- CHI – Walter Payton 1-yard run (PAT failed), 7:33 (SEA 28–22)
- SEA – Efrén Herrera 34-yard field goal, 5:06 (SEA 31–22)
- CHI – Roland Harper 2-yard run (Bob Thomas kick), 0:35 (SEA 31–29)

Top passers

- SEA – Jim Zorn: 13/24, 208 yds, 2 TD
- CHI – Mike Phipps: 15/25, 177 yds, 1 TD, 3 INT

Top rushers

- SEA – Sherman Smith: 23 car, 152 yds, 2 TD
- CHI – Walter Payton: 18 car, 109 yds, 2 TD

Top receivers

- SEA – Steve Largent: 6 rec, 126 yds, 2 TD
- CHI – James Scott: 5 rec, 88 yds

Team – pass – rush – total – to

- SEA – 165 – 224 – 389 – 1
- CHI – 227 – 174 – 401 – 3

==== Week 11: vs. Baltimore Colts ====
Week One: Seattle Seahawks vs. Baltimore Colts – Game summary

| Quarter | 1 | 2 | 3 | 4 | Total |
|---|---|---|---|---|---|
| Colts | 7 | 3 | 0 | 7 | 17 |
| Seahawks | 7 | 0 | 0 | 7 | 14 |

at Kingdome, Seattle

- Date: November 12
- Game time: 1:03 pm local
- Game weather: indoors
- Game attendance: 61,905
- Referee: Ben Dreith
- TV announcers (NBC): Jim Simpson and Paul Warfield
- Gamebook

Game information

First quarter

- BAL – Glenn Doughty 12-yard pass from Bert Jones (Toni Linhart kick), 3:14 (BAL 7–0)
- SEA – David Sims 44-yard run (Efrén Herrera kick), 0:24 (Tied 7–7)

Second quarter

- BAL – Toni Linhart 22-yard field goal, 9:58 (BAL 10–7)

Third quarter

- No scoring plays

Fourth quarter

- BAL – Ron Lee 14-yard run (Toni Linhart kick), 8:20 (BAL 17–7)
- SEA – David Sims 1-yard run (Efrén Herrera kick), 1:05 (BAL 17–14)

Top passers

- BAL – Bert Jones: 12/17, 128 yds, 1 TD
- SEA – Jim Zorn: 10/24, 119 yds, 1 INT

Top rushers

- BAL – Joe Washington: 25 car, 93 yds
- SEA – David Sims: 14 car, 106 yds, 2 TD

Top receivers

- BAL – Don McCauley: 10 rec, 88 yds
- SEA – Steve Largent: 4 rec, 57 yds

Team – pass – rush – total – to

- BAL – 115 – 133 – 248 – 1
- SEA – 95 – 168 – 263 – 3

==== Week 12: at Kansas City Chiefs ====
Week Twelve: Seattle Seahawks at Kansas City Chiefs – Game summary

| Quarter | 1 | 2 | 3 | 4 | Total |
|---|---|---|---|---|---|
| Seahawks | 3 | 7 | 3 | 0 | 13 |
| Chiefs | 0 | 3 | 0 | 7 | 10 |

at Arrowhead Stadium, Kansas City, Missouri

- Date: November 19
- Game time: 1:05 pm local
- Game weather: overcast, 36 °F (2 °C), 22% humidity, wind E 23 miles per hour (37 km/h)
- Game attendance: 35,252
- Referee: Chuck Heberling
- TV announcers (NBC): Marv Albert and Paul Maguire
- Gamebook

Game information

First quarter

- SEA – Efrén Herrera 40-yard field goal, 0:44 (SEA 3–0)

Second quarter

- SEA – David Sims 10-yard run (Efrén Herrera kick), 13:56 (SEA 10–0)
- KC – Jan Stenerud 20-yard field goal, 0:04 (SEA 10–3)

Third quarter

- SEA – Efrén Herrera 18-yard field goal, 9:08 (SEA 13–3)

Fourth quarter

- KC – Ted McKnight 1-yard pass from Mike Livingston (Jan Stenerud kick), 10:09 (SEA 13–10)

Top passers

- SEA – Jim Zorn: 14/23, 142 yds
- KC – Mike Livingston: 18/33, 231 yds, 1 TD

Top rushers

- SEA – Sherman Smith: 12 car, 84 yds
- KC – Tony Reed: 15 car, 50 yds

Top receivers

- SEA – Steve Largent: 6 rec, 89 yds
- KC – Henry Marshall: 4 rec, 78 yds

Team – pass – rush – total – to

- SEA – 125 – 132 – 257 – 0
- KC – 231 – 124 – 355 – 4

==== Week 13: at Oakland Raiders ====
Week Thirteen: Seattle Seahawks at Oakland Raiders – Game summary

| Quarter | 1 | 2 | 3 | 4 | Total |
|---|---|---|---|---|---|
| Seahawks | 7 | 0 | 0 | 10 | 17 |
| Raiders | 0 | 10 | 0 | 6 | 16 |

at Oakland–Alameda County Coliseum, Oakland, California

- Date: November 26
- Game time: 1:00 pm local
- Game weather: hazy, 50 °F (10 °C), 86% humidity, wind W 5 miles per hour (8.0 km/h)
- Game attendance: 52,978
- Referee: Jerry Markbreit
- TV announcers (NBC): Curt Gowdy and John Brodie
- Gamebook

Game information

First quarter

- SEA – Steve Raible 38-yard pass from Jim Zorn (Efrén Herrera kick), 3:41 (SEA 7–0)

Second quarter

- OAK – Mark van Eeghen 4-yard run (Errol Mann kick), 12:29 (Tied 7–7)
- OAK – Errol Mann 26-yard field goal, 1:03 (OAK 10–7)

Third quarter

- No scoring plays

Fourth quarter

- SEA – Steve Largent 27-yard pass from Jim Zorn (Efrén Herrera kick), 12:20 (SEA 14–10)
- OAK – Dave Casper 31-yard pass from Ken Stabler (PAT failed), 5:29 (OAK 16–14)
- SEA – Efrén Herrera 46-yard field goal, 0:02 (SEA 17–16)

Top passers

- SEA – Jim Zorn: 23/44, 270 yds, 2 TD, 1 INT
- OAK – Ken Stabler: 17/31, 218 yds, 1 TD

Top rushers

- SEA – Sherman Smith: 14 car, 28 yds
- OAK – Mark van Eeghen: 13 car, 53 yds, 1 TD

Top receivers

- SEA – Sam McCullum: 5 rec, 65 yds
- OAK – Dave Casper: 5 rec, 90 yds, 1 TD

Team – pass – rush – total – to

- SEA – 263 – 84 – 347 – 2
- OAK – 198 – 133 – 331 – 1

==== Week 14: vs. Cleveland Browns ====
Week Fourteen: Seattle Seahawks vs. Cleveland Browns – Game summary

| Quarter | 1 | 2 | 3 | 4 | Total |
|---|---|---|---|---|---|
| Browns | 0 | 10 | 7 | 7 | 24 |
| Seahawks | 14 | 9 | 7 | 17 | 47 |

at Kingdome, Seattle

- Date: December 3
- Game time: 1:00 pm local
- Game weather: indoors
- Game attendance: 62,262
- Referee: Don Wedge
- TV announcers (NBC): Jim Simpson and Paul Warfield
- Gamebook

Game information

First quarter

- SEA – Sherman Smith 1-yard run (Efrén Herrera kick), 11:50 (SEA 7–0)
- SEA – David Sims 9-yard run (Efrén Herrera kick), 1:54 (SEA 14–0)

Second quarter

- SEA – Steve Largent 27-yard pass from Jim Zorn (Efrén Herrera kick), 13:51 (SEA 21–0)
- SEA – Safety, Steve Raible ran Johnny Evans out of end zone, 11:40 (SEA 23–0)
- CLE – Dave Logan 7-yard pass from Brian Sipe (Don Cockroft kick), 4:00 (SEA 23–7)
- CLE – Don Cockroft 40-yard field goal, 0:01 (SEA 23–10)

Third quarter

- SEA – David Sims 19-yard run (Efrén Herrera kick), 11:14 (SEA 30–10)
- CLE – Greg Pruitt 26-yard pass from Brian Sipe (Don Cockroft kick), 5:33 (SEA 30–17)

Fourth quarter

- SEA – Efrén Herrera 38-yard field goal, 9:22 (SEA 33–17)
- SEA – David Sims 9-yard run (Efrén Herrera kick), 7:49 (SEA 40–17)
- CLE – Dave Logan 5-yard pass from Brian Sipe (Don Cockroft kick), 4:24 (SEA 40–24)
- SEA – Keith Simpson 40-yard interception return (Efrén Herrera kick), 0:43 (SEA 47–24)

Top passers

- CLE – Brian Sipe: 20/36, 250 yds, 3 TD, 1 INT
- SEA – Jim Zorn: 15/24, 219 yds, 1 TD, 1 INT

Top rushers

- CLE – Greg Pruitt: 12 car, 133 yds
- SEA – David Sims: 23 car, 91 yds, 3 TD

Top receivers

- CLE – Reggie Rucker: 4 rec, 86 yds
- SEA – Steve Largent: 8 rec, 108 yds, 1 TD

Team – pass – rush – total – to

- CLE – 259 – 193 – 452 – 6
- SEA – 235 – 183 – 418 – 2

==== Week 15: at San Diego Chargers ====
Week Fifteen: Seattle Seahawks at San Diego Chargers – Game summary

| Quarter | 1 | 2 | 3 | 4 | Total |
|---|---|---|---|---|---|
| Seahawks | 7 | 3 | 0 | 0 | 10 |
| Chargers | 3 | 17 | 0 | 17 | 37 |

at San Diego Stadium, San Diego

- Date: December 10
- Game time: 1:00 pm local
- Game weather: clear, 69 °F (21 °C), 50% humidity, wind W 8 miles per hour (13 km/h)
- Game attendance: 49,975
- Referee: Pat Haggerty
- TV announcers (NBC): Jim Simpson and Paul Warfield
- Gamebook

Game information

First quarter

- SD – Rolf Benirschke 37-yard field goal, 8:21 (SD 3–0)
- SEA – David Sims 2-yard pass from Jim Zorn (Efrén Herrera kick), 2:20 (SEA 7–3)

Second quarter

- SEA – Efrén Herrera 48-yard field goal, 12:44 (SEA 10–3)
- SD – Rolf Benirschke 26-yard field goal, 4:33 (SEA 10–6)
- SD – John Jefferson 31-yard pass from Dan Fouts (Rolf Benirschke kick), 1:56 (SD 13–10)
- SD – John Jefferson 6-yard pass from Dan Fouts (Rolf Benirschke kick), 0:22 (SD 20–10)

Third quarter

- No scoring plays

Fourth quarter

- SD – Larry Burton 55-yard pass from Dan Fouts (Rolf Benirschke kick), 14:06 (SD 27–10)
- SD – Hank Bauer 1-yard run (Rolf Benirschke kick), 9:58 (SD 34–10)
- SD – Rolf Benirschke 27-yard field goal, 6:51 (SD 37–10)

Top passers

- SEA – Jim Zorn: 14/31, 150 yds, 1 TD, 1 INT
- SD – Dan Fouts: 22/33, 279 yds, 3 TD, 1 INT

Top rushers

- SEA – Sherman Smith: 10 car, 63 yds
- SD – Don Woods: 11 car, 47 yds

Top receivers

- SEA – Steve Largent: 3 rec, 46 yds
- SD – John Jefferson: 5 rec, 82 yds, 2 TD

Team – pass – rush – total – to

- SEA – 103 – 136 – 239 – 3
- SD – 286 – 95 – 381 – 1

==== Week 16: vs. Kansas City Chiefs ====
Week Sixteen: Seattle Seahawks vs. Kansas City Chiefs – Game summary

| Quarter | 1 | 2 | 3 | 4 | Total |
|---|---|---|---|---|---|
| Chiefs | 3 | 7 | 7 | 2 | 19 |
| Seahawks | 7 | 13 | 0 | 3 | 23 |

at Kingdome, Seattle

- Date: December 17
- Game time: 1:00 pm local
- Game weather: indoors
- Game attendance: 58,490
- Referee: Bob Frederic
- TV announcers (NBC): Jay Randolph and Ed Podolak
- Gamebook

Game information

First quarter

- SEA – Steve Largent 57-yard pass from Jim Zorn (Efrén Herrera kick), 9:15 (SEA 7–0)
- KC – Jan Stenerud 33-yard field goal, 6:16 (SEA 7–3)

Second quarter

- SEA – Al Hunter 5-yard run (PAT failed), 8:56 (SEA 13–3)
- SEA – Al Hunter 5-yard run (Efrén Herrera kick), 5:12 (SEA 20–3)
- KC – Arnold Morgado 1-yard run (Jan Stenerud kick), 1:58 (SEA 20–10)

Third quarter

- KC – Tony Reed 62-yard run (Jan Stenerud kick), 7:39 (SEA 20–17)

Fourth quarter

- SEA – Efrén Herrera 31-yard field goal, 6:47 (SEA 23–17)
- KC – Safety, Ed Beckman ran Herman Weaver out of end zone, 0:15 (SEA 23–19)

Top passers

- KC – Mike Livingston: 5/19, 66 yds, 3 INT
- SEA – Jim Zorn: 18/29, 256 yds, 1 TD, 1 INT

Top rushers

- KC – Tony Reed: 11 car, 121 yds, 1 TD
- SEA – Al Hunter: 27 car, 133 yds, 1 TD

Top receivers

- KC – Henry Marshall: 1 rec, 40 yds
- SEA – Steve Largent: 3 rec, 81 yds, 1 TD

Team – pass – rush – total – to

- KC – 44 – 253 – 297 – 3
- SEA – 252 – 204 – 456 – 2
