= 1977 Seattle Seahawks season =

American football team season

- Owner: The Nordstrom family
- General manager: John Thompson
- Head coach: Jack Patera
- Home stadium: Kingdome

Results
- Record: 5–9
- Division place: 4th AFC West
- Playoffs: Did not qualify
- All-Pros: None
- Pro Bowlers: None

The 1977 season was the Seattle Seahawks' 2nd in the National Football League (NFL). This season was the team's first in the AFC West (the conference swap was part of the NFL's expansion plan that saw both the Seahawks and Tampa Bay Buccaneers play every other team in the NFL in their first two seasons; the Seahawks would return to the NFC West in 2002). The Seahawks lost five of their first six games. On October 30, the Seahawks earned their second win of the season when quarterback Jim Zorn returned from an injury and threw four touchdown passes in a 56–17 win over the Buffalo Bills at the Kingdome. Two weeks later, the team recorded its first shutout, beating the New York Jets 17–0 in New York. The Seahawks would go on to finish with a 5–9 record, winning their final two games in the process; it was a three-game improvement from the inaugural season.

== Offseason ==
=== Draft ===
1977 Seattle Seahawks draft
Round	Pick	Player	Position	College	Notes
1	14	Steve August	Offensive tackle	Tulsa	
2	30	Tom Lynch	Guard	Boston College	
2	41	Terry Beeson	Linebacker	Kansas	
2	51	Peter Cronan	Linebacker	Boston College	
3	58	Dennis Boyd	Defensive end	Oregon State	
4	87	John Yarno	Center	Idaho	
4	111	Larry Seivers	Wide receiver	Tennessee	
6	142	Tony Benjamin	Running back	Duke	
7	169	David Sims	Running back	Georgia Tech	
9	225	George Adzick	Safety	Minnesota	
10	254	Sam Adkins	Quarterback	Wichita State	
11	281	Bill Westbeld	Offensive Tackle	Dayton	
12	329	I. V. Wilson	Defensive tackle	Tulsa	
Made roster

=== Supplemental draft ===
1977 Seattle Seahawks draft
Round	Pick	Player	Position	College	Notes
4	--	Al Hunter	Running back	Notre Dame	
Made roster

=== Undrafted free agents ===
1977 undrafted free agents of note
Player	Position	College
Charles Bell	Defensive back	Texas A&M
Greg Champlin	Wide receiver	Denver
Jim Cramer	Linebacker	Pittsburgh
Murray Cunningham	Kicker	Tennessee Tech
Tom Fine	Tackle	Notre Dame
Jim Gagnon	Defensive End	Wisconsin–River Falls
Dick Geddes	Defensive tackle	Illinois Wesleyan
Dave Lowry	Running back	BYU
Carl Van Valkenberg	Tackle	Washington

== Personnel ==
=== Staff ===
1977 Seattle Seahawks staff
**Front office**: Chairman – Elmer J. Nordstrom, representing the Nordstrom family; Managing general partner – Herman Sarkowsky; Partner – D.E. (Ned) Skinner; Partner – Howard S. Wright; Partner – M. Lamont Bean; Partner – Lynn P. Himmelman; general manager – John Thompson; Assistant general manager – Mark Duncan; Director of player personnel – Dick Mansperger; Director of pro scouting – Chuck Allen; Director of ticket sales and marketing – Vince Lombardi (Jr.); **Head coaches**: Head coach – Jack Patera; **Offensive coaches**: Offensive coordinator/offensive line – Sam Boghosian; Quarterbacks/receivers – Jerry Rhome; Offensive backs – Andy MacDonald	**Defensive coaches**: Defensive coordinator/defensive backs – Bob Hollway; Defensive line – Earl Leggett; Linebackers – Larry Peccatiello; **Strength and conditioning**: Head trainer – Bruce Scott; Assistant trainer – Jim Whitesel

=== Final roster ===
1977 Seattle Seahawks roster
**Quarterbacks (QB)**: 12 Sam Adkins; 16 Steve Myer; **10** Jim Zorn; **Running backs (RB)**: 24 Al Hunter; 49 Ed Marinaro; 35 David Sims; **47** Sherman Smith; **42** Don Testerman; **Wide receivers (WR)**: **89** Duke Fergerson; **80** Steve Largent; 84 Sam McCullum; 83 Steve Raible; **Tight ends (TE)**: **87** Ron Howard; 81 John Sawyer	**Offensive linemen (OL)**: 76 Steve August T; **63** Nick Bebout T; **60** Ron Coder G; **73** Norm Evans T; **64** Gordon Jolley G/T; **54** Art Kuehn C; 61 Tom Lynch G; 78 Bob Newton T/G; 55 Geoff Reece C; 51 John Yarno C; **Defensive linemen (DL)**: 68 Dennis Boyd DT/DE; **74** Ron East DT; **77** Richard Harris DE; **70** Bob Lurtsema DT/DE; 71 Steve Niehaus DE; **75** Alden Roche DE	**Linebackers (LB)**: **58** Terry Beeson MLB; 57 Peter Cronan MLB; **36** Ken Geddes OLB; **56** Sammy Green OLB; 53 Mike Jones OLB; 59 Charles McShane OLB; **Defensive backs (DB)**: **27** Autry Beamon SS; **22** Dave Brown CB; 25 Don Dufek SS; **41** Eddie McMillan CB; **20** Steve Preece FS; 38 Cornell Webster CB; **Special teams (ST)**: 3 John Leypoldt K; 18 Herman Weaver P	**Reserve**: 46 George Adzick S (IR); 31 Tony Benjamin RB (IR); 52 Randy Coffield LB (IR); 62 Ruben Hodges DE (IR); 79 Horace Jones DE (IR); 23 Doug Long S (IR); 50 Amos Martin LB (IR); 82 Fred Rayhle TE (IR); 66 Bill Sandifer DT (IR); 67 Carl Van Valkenberg T (IR); Rookies in italics 44 active, 10 reserve

- Starters in bold.

== Schedule ==
=== Preseason ===
Week	Date	Opponent	Result	Record	Venue	Recap
1	August 7	at San Francisco 49ers	**W** 34–24	1–0	Candlestick Park	Recap
2	August 13	Dallas Cowboys	**W** 23–17 (OT)	2–0	Kingdome	Recap
3	August 18	Oakland Raiders	**W** 12–10	3–0	Kingdome	Recap
4	August 27	Detroit Lions	**L** 14–16	3–1	Kingdome	Recap
5	September 2	Denver Broncos	**L** 10–27	3–2	Kingdome	Recap
6	September 11	at San Diego Chargers	**L** 20–38	3–3	San Diego Stadium	Recap

Source: Seahawks Media Guides

=== Regular season ===
In its second year, Seattle played all of the teams in the AFC as a member of the AFC West, with one inter-conference game against Tampa Bay.

Week	Date	Opponent	Result	Record	Venue	Recap
1	September 18	Baltimore Colts	**L** 14–29	0–1	Kingdome	Recap
2	September 25	at Cincinnati Bengals	**L** 20–42	0–2	Riverfront Stadium	Recap
3	October 2	**Denver Broncos**	**L** 13–24	0–3	Kingdome	Recap
4	October 9	at New England Patriots	**L** 0–31	0–4	Schaefer Stadium	Recap
5	October 16	Tampa Bay Buccaneers	**W** 30–23	1–4	Kingdome	Recap
6	October 23	at Miami Dolphins	**L** 13–31	1–5	Miami Orange Bowl	Recap
7	October 30	Buffalo Bills	**W** 56–17	2–5	Kingdome	Recap
8	November 6	at **Oakland Raiders**	**L** 7–44	2–6	Oakland–Alameda County Coliseum	Recap
9	November 13	at New York Jets	**W** 17–0	3–6	Shea Stadium	Recap
10	November 20	Houston Oilers	**L** 10–22	3–7	Kingdome	Recap
11	November 27	**San Diego Chargers**	**L** 28–30	3–8	Kingdome	Recap
12	December 4	at Pittsburgh Steelers	**L** 20–30	3–9	Three Rivers Stadium	Recap
13	December 11	at **Kansas City Chiefs**	**W** 34–31	4–9	Arrowhead Stadium	Recap
14	December 18	Cleveland Browns	**W** 20–19	5–9	Kingdome	Recap
Note: Intra-division opponents are in **bold** text.

Source: 1977 NFL season results

== Standings ==
AFC West
	W	L	T	PCT	DIV	CONF	PF	PA	STK
^{(1)} Denver Broncos	12	2	0	.857	6–1	11–1	274	148	L1
^{(4)} Oakland Raiders	11	3	0	.786	5–2	10–2	351	230	W2
San Diego Chargers	7	7	0	.500	3–4	6–6	222	205	L2
Seattle Seahawks	5	9	0	.357	1–3	4–9	282	373	W2
Kansas City Chiefs	2	12	0	.143	1–6	1–11	225	349	L6

== Game summaries ==
=== Preseason ===
==== Week P1: at San Francisco 49ers ====
Preseason Week One: Seattle Seahawks at San Francisco 49ers – Game summary

Quarter	1	2	3	4	Total
Seahawks	3	10	7	14	34
49ers	7	10	7	0	24

at Candlestick Park, San Francisco

- Date: August 7
- Game time: 1:01 pm local
- Game weather: partly cloudy, 68 °F (20 °C), wind variable
- Game attendance: 38,024
- Referee: Fred Silva
- TV: KIRO
- Gamebook

==== Week P2: vs. Dallas Cowboys ====
Preseason Week Two: Seattle Seahawks vs. Dallas Cowboys – Game summary

Quarter	1	2	3	4	OT	Total
Cowboys	3	0	14	0	0	17
Seahawks	0	3	7	7	6	23

at Kingdome, Seattle

- Date: August 13
- Game time: 6:06 pm local
- Game weather: indoors
- Game attendance: 58,789
- Referee: Bob Frederic
- TV: KIRO tape delay
- Gamebook

==== Week P3: vs. Oakland Raiders ====
Preseason Week Three: Seattle Seahawks vs. Oakland Raiders – Game summary

Quarter	1	2	3	4	Total
Raiders	10	0	0	0	10
Seahawks	0	0	6	6	12

at Kingdome, Seattle

- Date: August 18
- Game time: 7:08 pm local
- Game weather: indoors
- Game attendance: 62,187
- Referee: Jim Tunney
- TV: KIRO tape delay
- Gamebook

==== Week P4: vs. Detroit Lions ====
Preseason Week Four: Seattle Seahawks vs. Detroit Lions – Game summary

Quarter	1	2	3	4	Total
Lions	2	14	0	0	16
Seahawks	0	7	0	7	14

at Kingdome, Seattle

- Date: August 27
- Game time: 5:00 pm local
- Game weather: indoors
- Game attendance: 56,345
- Referee: Fred Silva
- TV: KIRO tape delay
- Gamebook

==== Week P5: vs. Denver Broncos ====
Preseason Week Five: Seattle Seahawks vs. Denver Broncos – Game summary

Quarter	1	2	3	4	Total
Broncos	10	0	10	7	27
Seahawks	0	3	0	7	10

at Kingdome, Seattle

- Date: September 2
- Game time: 7:06 pm local
- Game weather: indoors
- Game attendance: 54,916
- Referee: Red Cashion
- TV: KIRO tape delay
- Gamebook

==== Week P6: at San Diego Chargers ====
Preseason Week Six: Seattle Seahawks at San Diego Chargers – Game summary

Quarter	1	2	3	4	Total
Seahawks	6	0	14	0	20
Chargers	7	21	0	10	38

at San Diego Stadium, San Diego

- Date: September 11
- Game time: 1:00 pm local
- Game weather: clear, 72 °F (22 °C), wind W 10 miles per hour (16 km/h)
- Game attendance: 60,825
- Referee: Ben Dreith
- TV: KIRO
- Gamebook

=== Regular season ===
==== Week 1: vs. Baltimore Colts ====
Week One: Seattle Seahawks vs. Baltimore Colts – Game summary

Quarter	1	2	3	4	Total
Colts	7	7	5	10	29
Seahawks	0	7	0	7	14

at Kingdome, Seattle

- Date: September 18
- Game time: 1:03 pm local
- Game weather: indoors
- Game attendance: 58,991
- Referee: Jim Tunney
- TV announcers (NBC): Stu Nahan and Floyd Little
- Gamebook

Game information

First quarter

- BAL – Don McCauley 6-yard run (Toni Linhart kick), 6:00 (BAL 7–0)

Second quarter

- SEA – Don Testerman 1-yard pass from Jim Zorn (John Leypoldt kick), 8:46 (Tied 7–7)
- BAL – Roosevelt Leaks 10-yard rush (Toni Linhart kick), 3:21 (BAL 14–7)

Third quarter

- BAL – Safety, Doug Nettles blocked punt out of end zone, 13:37 (BAL 16–7)
- BAL – Toni Linhart 38-yard field goal, 7:37 (BAL 19–7)

Fourth quarter

- BAL – Toni Linhart 42-yard field goal, 14:53 (BAL 22–7)
- SEA – Autry Beamon 17-yard blocked punt return (John Leypoldt kick), 9:32 (BAL 22–14)
- BAL – Roger Carr 21-yard pass from Bert Jones (Toni Linhart kick), 5:50 (BAL 29–14)

Top passers

- BAL – Bert Jones: 17/26, 220 yds, 1 TD
- SEA – Jim Zorn: 14/34, 164 yds, 1 TD, 4 INT

Top rushers

- BAL – Lydell Mitchell: 32 car, 114 yds
- SEA – Sherman Smith: 15 car, 58 yds

Top receivers

- BAL – Roger Carr: 2 rec, 66 yds, 1 TD
- SEA – Steve Largent: 4 rec, 73 yds

Team – pass – rush – total – to

- BAL – 220 – 206 – 426 – 1
- SEA – 151 – 104 – 255 – 4

==== Week 2: at Cincinnati Bengals ====
Week Two: Seattle Seahawks at Cincinnati Bengals – Game summary

Quarter	1	2	3	4	Total
Seahawks	0	7	13	0	20
Bengals	21	7	0	14	42

at Riverfront Stadium, Cincinnati, Ohio

- Date: September 25
- Game time: 1:00 pm local
- Game weather: clear, 71 °F (22 °C), 84% humidity, wind SW 7 miles per hour (11 km/h)
- Game attendance: 45,579
- Referee: Cal Lepore
- TV announcers (NBC): Jack Buck and Paul Maguire
- Gamebook

Game information

First quarter

- CIN – Tony Davis 2-yard run (Chris Bahr kick), 12:36 (CIN 7–0)
- CIN – Pete Johnson 10-yard run (Chris Bahr kick), 8:51 (CIN 14–0)
- CIN – Ken Anderson 5-yard run (Chris Bahr kick), 3:13 (CIN 21–0)

Second quarter

- CIN – Reggie Williams 54-yard interception return (Chris Bahr kick), 12:29 (CIN 28–0)
- SEA – David Sims 82-yard pass from Jim Zorn (John Leypoldt kick), 3:16 (CIN 28–7)

Third quarter

- SEA – David Sims 2-yard run (John Leypoldt kick), 10:20 (CIN 28–14)
- SEA – John Leypoldt 32-yard field goal, 7:18 (CIN 28–17)
- SEA – John Leypoldt 42-yard field goal, 5:16 (CIN 28–20)

Fourth quarter

- CIN – Isaac Curtis 32-yard pass from Ken Anderson (Chris Bahr kick), 12:13 (CIN 35–20)
- CIN – Lenvil Elliott 18-yard pass from Archie Griffin (Chris Bahr kick), 6:01 (CIN 42–20)

Top passers

- SEA – Jim Zorn: 10/28, 176 yds, 1 TD, 3 INT
- CIN – Ken Anderson: 17/29, 219 yds, 1 TD, 1 INT

Top rushers

- SEA – Tony Benjamin: 10 car, 37 yds
- CIN – Archie Griffin: 17 car, 79 yds

Top receivers

- SEA – David Sims: 4 rec, 105 yds, 1 TD
- CIN – Isaac Curtis: 3 rec, 100 yds, 1 TD

Team – pass – rush – total – to

- SEA – 172 – 110 – 282 – 3
- CIN – 225 – 199 – 424 – 1

==== Week 3: vs. Denver Broncos ====
Week Three: Seattle Seahawks vs. Denver Broncos – Game summary

Quarter	1	2	3	4	Total
Broncos	10	0	14	0	24
Seahawks	7	0	6	0	13

at Kingdome, Seattle

- Date: October 2
- Game time: 1:03 pm local
- Game weather: indoors
- Game attendance: 53,108
- Referee: Jerry Markbreit
- TV announcers (NBC): Stu Nahan and Mike Haffner
- Gamebook

Game information

First quarter

- DEN – Lonnie Perrin 1-yard run (Jim Turner kick), 11:09 (DEN 7–0)
- SEA – Ron Howard 7-yard pass from Steve Myer (John Leypoldt kick), 8:32 (Tied 7–7)
- DEN – Jim Turner 36-yard field goal, 0:18 (DEN 10–7)

Second quarter

- No scoring plays

Third quarter

- DEN – Rob Lytle 47-yard pass from Craig Morton (Jim Turner kick), 12:09 (DEN 17–7)
- SEA – Steve Largent 43-yard pass from David Sims (PAT failed), 4:57 (DEN 17–13)
- DEN – Craig Morton 1-yard run (Jim Turner kick), 0:27 (DEN 24–13)

Fourth quarter

- No scoring plays

Top passers

- DEN – Craig Morton: 12/21, 181 yds, 1 TD, 1 INT
- SEA – Steve Myer: 20/29, 165 yds, 1 TD, 1 INT

Top rushers

- DEN – Lonnie Perrin: 14 car, 55 yds, 1 TD
- SEA – Sherman Smith: 13 car, 47 yds

Top receivers

- DEN – Haven Moses: 5 rec, 92 yds
- SEA – Steve Largent: 3 rec, 71 yds, 1 TD

Team – pass – rush – total – to

- DEN – 177 – 153 – 330 – 2
- SEA – 191 – 81 – 272 – 3

==== Week 4: at New England Patriots ====
Week Four: Seattle Seahawks at New England Patriots – Game summary

Quarter	1	2	3	4	Total
Seahawks	0	0	0	0	0
Patriots	7	7	17	0	31

at Schaefer Stadium, Foxborough, Massachusetts

- Date: October 9
- Game time: 1:00 pm local
- Game weather: rain, 63 °F (17 °C), 97% humidity, wind SE 18 miles per hour (29 km/h)
- Game attendance: 45,927
- Referee: Bernie Ulman
- TV announcers (NBC): Dick Stockton and Lionel Aldridge
- Gamebook

Game information

First quarter

- NE – Don Hasselbeck 2-yard pass from Steve Grogan (John Smith kick), 8:32 (NE 7–0)

Second quarter

- NE – Russ Francis 1-yard pass from Steve Grogan (John Smith kick), 0:07 (NE 14–0)

Third quarter

- NE – Don Calhoun 18-yard run (John Smith kick), 9:37 (NE 21–0)
- NE – John Smith 36-yard field goal, 2:48 (NE 24–0)
- NE – Darryl Stingley 24-yard pass from Steve Grogan (John Smith kick), 0:28 (NE 31–0)

Fourth quarter

- No scoring plays

Top passers

- SEA – Steve Myer: 5/23, 71 yds, 4 INT
- NE – Steve Grogan: 9/15, 137 yds, 3 TD, 1 INT

Top rushers

- SEA – David Sims: 11 car, 33 yds
- NE – Sam Cunningham: 31 car, 101 yds

Top receivers

- SEA – Sherman Smith: 1 rec, 28 yds
- NE – Stanley Morgan: 2 rec, 63 yds

Team – pass – rush – total – to

- SEA – 50 – 95 – 145 – 5
- NE – 137 – 196 – 333 – 3

==== Week 5: vs. Tampa Bay Buccaneers ====
Week Five: Seattle Seahawks vs. Tampa Bay Buccaneers – Game summary

Quarter	1	2	3	4	Total
Buccaneers	6	7	3	7	23
Seahawks	7	10	0	13	30

at Kingdome, Seattle

- Date: October 16
- Game time: 1:02 pm local
- Game weather: indoors
- Game attendance: 54,783
- Referee: Fred Silva
- TV announcers (CBS): Jim Thacker and Johnny Unitas
- Gamebook

Game information

First quarter

- SEA – Steve Largent 8-yard pass from Steve Myer (John Leypoldt kick), 10:52 (SEA 7–0)
- TB – Allan Leavitt 40-yard field goal, 4:24 (SEA 7–3)
- TB – Allan Leavitt 37-yard field goal, 2:02 (SEA 7–6)

Second quarter

- SEA – Steve Largent 4-yard pass from Steve Myer (John Leypoldt kick), 12:43 (SEA 14–6)
- TB – Anthony Davis 1-yard run (Allan Leavitt kick), 0:47 (SEA 14–13)
- SEA – John Leypoldt 43-yard field goal, 0:02 (SEA 17–13)

Third quarter

- TB – Allan Leavitt 20-yard field goal, 9:53 (SEA 17–16)

Fourth quarter

- SEA – Duke Fergerson 45-yard pass from Steve Myer (John Leypoldt kick), 10:42 (SEA 24–16)
- TB – Morris Owens 67-yard pass from Gary Huff (Allan Leavitt kick), 10:17 (SEA 24–23)
- SEA – Sherman Smith 44-yard pass from Steve Myer (PAT failed), 7:07 (SEA 30–23)

Top passers

- TB – Gary Huff: 18/32, 217 yds, 1 TD, 4 INT
- SEA – Steve Myer: 20/30, 252 yds, 4 TD, 2 INT

Top rushers

- TB – Anthony Davis: 14 car, 83 yds, 1 TD
- SEA – Sherman Smith: 19 car, 94 yds

Top receivers

- TB – Morris Owens: 9 rec, 166 yds, 1 TD
- SEA – Duke Fergerson: 3 rec, 65 yds, 1 TD

Team – pass – rush – total – to

- TAM – 217 – 167 – 384 – 6
- SEA – 241 – 134 – 375 – 2

==== Week 6: at Miami Dolphins ====
Week Six: Seattle Seahawks at Miami Dolphins – Game summary

Quarter	1	2	3	4	Total
Seahawks	3	7	0	3	13
Dolphins	0	24	0	7	31

at Orange Bowl, Miami

- Date: October 23
- Game time: 1:00 pm local
- Game weather: cloudy, 76 °F (24 °C), 91% humidity, wind N 13 miles per hour (21 km/h)
- Game attendance: 29,855
- Referee: Gordon McCarter
- TV announcers (NBC): Marv Albert and Mike Haffner
- Gamebook

Game information

First quarter

- SEA – John Leypoldt 19-yard field goal, 4:20 (SEA 3–0)

Second quarter

- MIA – Nat Moore 12-yard pass from Bob Griese (Garo Yepremian kick), 13:43 (MIA 7–3)
- MIA – Don Nottingham 1-yard run (Garo Yepremian kick), 6:07 (MIA 14–3)
- SEA – Steve Largent 13-yard pass from Steve Myer (John Leypoldt kick), 3:06 (MIA 14–10)
- MIA – Nat Moore 4-yard pass from Bob Griese (Garo Yepremian kick), 0:31 (MIA 21–10)
- MIA – Garo Yepremian 29-yard field goal, 0:00 (MIA 24–10)

Third quarter

- No scoring plays

Fourth quarter

- SEA – John Leypoldt 41-yard field goal, 14:55 (MIA 24–13)
- MIA – Don Nottingham 3-yard run (Garo Yepremian kick), 3:11 (MIA 31–13)

Top passers

- SEA – Steve Myer: 17/32, 160 yds, 1 TD, 3 INT
- MIA – Bob Griese: 11/18, 105 yds, 2 TD, 1 INT

Top rushers

- SEA – Don Testerman: 14 car, 50 yds
- MIA – Benny Malone: 21 car, 74 yds

Top receivers

- SEA – Duke Fergerson: 2 rec, 36 yds
- MIA – Nat Moore: 5 rec, 46 yds, 2 TD

Team – pass – rush – total – to

- SEA – 143 – 79 – 222 – 3
- MIA – 86 – 136 – 222 – 1

==== Week 7: vs. Buffalo Bills ====
Week Seven: Seattle Seahawks vs. Buffalo Bills – Game summary

Quarter	1	2	3	4	Total
Bills	3	0	7	7	17
Seahawks	14	28	7	7	56

at Kingdome, Seattle

- Date: October 30
- Game time: 1:01 pm local
- Game weather: indoors
- Game attendance: 61,180
- Referee: Ben Dreith
- TV announcers (NBC): Charlie Jones and Mike Adamle
- Gamebook

Game information

First quarter

- BUF – Carson Long 25-yard field goal, 6:35 (BUF 3–0)
- SEA – Steve Largent 31-yard pass from Jim Zorn (John Leypoldt kick), 4:01 (SEA 7–3)
- SEA – Duke Fergerson 37-yard pass from Jim Zorn (John Leypoldt kick), 2:35 (SEA 14–3)

Second quarter

- SEA – Steve Largent 48-yard pass from Jim Zorn (John Leypoldt kick), 9:32 (SEA 21–3)
- SEA – Jim Zorn 4-yard run (John Leypoldt kick), 8:14 (SEA 28–3)
- SEA – Sherman Smith 13-yard run (John Leypoldt kick), 4:44 (SEA 35–3)
- SEA – Don Testerman 10-yard pass from Jim Zorn (John Leypoldt kick), 1:46 (SEA 42–3)

Third quarter

- SEA – David Sims 17-yard run (John Leypoldt kick), 5:42 (SEA 49–3)
- BUF – John Kimbrough 38-yard pass from Joe Ferguson (Carson Long kick), 1:34 (SEA 49–10)

Fourth quarter

- SEA – Al Hunter 1-yard run (John Leypoldt kick), 7:51 (SEA 56–10)
- BUF – Joe Ferguson 4-yard run (Carson Long kick), 3:42 (SEA 56–17)

Top passers

- BUF – Joe Ferguson: 17/37, 227 yds, 1 TD, 3 INT
- SEA – Jim Zorn: 11/23, 296 yds, 4 TD, 2 INT

Top rushers

- BUF – Jim Braxton: 10 car, 42 yds
- SEA – Sherman Smith: 10 car, 73 yds, 1 TD

Top receivers

- BUF – John Kimbrough: 4 rec, 81 yds, 1 TD
- SEA – Steve Largent: 4 rec, 134 yds, 2 TD

Team – pass – rush – total – to

- BUF – 221 – 115 – 336 – 3
- SEA – 226 – 333 – 559 – 3

==== Week 8: at Oakland Raiders ====
Week Eight: Seattle Seahawks at Oakland Raiders – Game summary

Quarter	1	2	3	4	Total
Seahawks	0	0	7	0	7
Raiders	3	24	10	7	44

at Oakland–Alameda County Coliseum, Oakland, California

- Date: November 6
- Game time: 1:00 pm local
- Game weather: clear, 68 °F (20 °C), 39% humidity, wind 23 miles per hour (37 km/h)
- Game attendance: 50,929
- Referee: Don Wedge
- TV announcers (NBC): Stu Nahan and Mike Haffner
- Gamebook

Game information

First quarter

- OAK – Errol Mann 35-yard field goal, 7:43 (OAK 3–0)

Second quarter

- OAK – Fred Biletnikoff 3-yard pass from Ken Stabler (Errol Mann kick), 13:37 (OAK 10–0)
- OAK – Errol Mann 39-yard field goal, 7:25 (OAK 13–0)
- OAK – Clarence Davis 2-yard run (Errol Mann kick), 6:57 (OAK 20–0)
- OAK – Mike Siani 12-yard pass from Ken Stabler (Errol Mann kick), 0:52 (OAK 27–0)

Third quarter

- OAK – Errol Mann 37-yard field goal, 10:05 (OAK 30–0)
- OAK – Dave Casper 15-yard pass from Ken Stabler (Errol Mann kick), 9:05 (OAK 37–0)
- SEA – Sherman Smith 16-yard run (John Leypoldt kick), 4:15 (OAK 37–7)

Fourth quarter

- OAK – Terry Robiskie 1-yard run (Errol Mann kick), 7:31 (OAK 44–7)

Top passers

- SEA – Jim Zorn: 7/20, 47 yds, 2 INT
- OAK – Ken Stabler: 14/22, 145 yds, 3 TD

Top rushers

- SEA – Sherman Smith: 10 car, 74 yds, 1 TD
- OAK – Clarence Davis: 18 car, 100 yds, 1 TD

Top receivers

- SEA – Sherman Smith: 3 rec, 18 yds
- OAK – Mike Siani: 6 rec, 67 yds, 1 TD

Team – pass – rush – total – to

- SEA – 51 – 126 – 177 – 4
- OAK – 149 – 248 – 397 – 0

==== Week 9: at New York Jets ====
Week Nine: Seattle Seahawks at New York Jets – Game summary

Quarter	1	2	3	4	Total
Seahawks	7	0	7	3	17
Jets	0	0	0	0	0

at Shea Stadium, New York

- Date: November 13
- Game time: 1:02 pm local
- Game weather: partly cloudy, 41 °F (5 °C), 60% humidity, wind NW 18 miles per hour (29 km/h)
- Game attendance: 42,923
- Referee: Fred Wyant
- TV announcers (NBC): Marv Albert and Jimmy Johnson
- Gamebook

Game information

First quarter

- SEA – Don Testerman 18-yard pass from Jim Zorn (John Leypoldt kick), 9:42 (SEA 7–0)

Second quarter

- No scoring plays

Third quarter

- SEA – David Sims 9-yard pass from Jim Zorn (John Leypoldt kick), 6:01 (SEA 14–0)

Fourth quarter

- SEA – John Leypoldt 33-yard field goal, 12:24 (SEA 17–0)

Top passers

- SEA – Jim Zorn: 16/37, 219 yds, 2 TD
- NYJ – Matt Robinson: 4/9, 32 yds, 2 INT

Top rushers

- SEA – David Sims: 17 car, 68 yds
- NYJ – Scott Dierking: 12 car, 53 yds

Top receivers

- SEA – Al Hunter: 2 rec, 36 yds
- NYJ – Clark Gaines: 3 rec, 27 yds

Team – pass – rush – total – to

- SEA – 213 – 232 – 445 – 1
- NYJ – 25 – 99 – 124 – 3

==== Week 10: vs. Houston Oilers ====
Week Ten: Seattle Seahawks vs. Houston Oilers – Game summary

Quarter	1	2	3	4	Total
Oilers	0	10	3	9	22
Seahawks	0	3	0	7	10

at Kingdome, Seattle

- Date: November 20
- Game time: 1:02 pm local
- Game weather: indoors
- Game attendance: 61,519
- Referee: Jerry Markbreit
- TV announcers (NBC): Stu Nahan and Floyd Little
- Gamebook

Game information

First quarter

- No scoring plays

Second quarter

- SEA – John Leypoldt 51-yard field goal, 13:47 (SEA 3–0)
- HOU – Tom Dempsey 27-yard field goal, 5:37 (Tied 3–3)
- HOU – Ken Burrough 31-yard pass from Dan Pastorini (Tom Dempsey kick), 0:46 (HOU 10–3)

Third quarter

- HOU – Tom Dempsey 37-yard field goal, 3:46 (HOU 13–3)

Fourth quarter

- HOU – Ronnie Coleman 1-yard run (Tom Dempsey kick), 14:12 (HOU 20–3)
- SEA – Sherman Smith 2-yard run (John Leypoldt kick), 7:17 (HOU 20–10)
- HOU – Safety, Steve Myer tackled in end zone, 0:11 (HOU 22–10)

Top passers

- HOU – Dan Pastorini: 21/36, 237 yds, 1 TD, 2 INT
- SEA – Steve Myer: 3/8, 36 yds, 1 INT

Top rushers

- HOU – Rob Carpenter: 25 car, 97 yds
- SEA – Sherman Smith: 13 car, 47 yds, 1 TD

Top receivers

- HOU – Ken Burrough: 5 rec, 80 yds, 1 TD
- SEA – Don Testerman: 1 rec, 25 yds

Team – pass – rush – total – to

- HOU – 237 – 195 – 432 – 3
- SEA – 27 – 102 – 129 – 4

==== Week 11: vs. San Diego Chargers ====
Week Eleven: Seattle Seahawks vs. San Diego Chargers – Game summary

Quarter	1	2	3	4	Total
Chargers	10	3	3	14	30
Seahawks	0	14	7	7	28

at Kingdome, Seattle

- Date: November 27
- Game time: 1:02 pm local
- Game weather: indoors
- Game attendance: 58,994
- Referee: Gene Barth
- TV announcers (NBC): Dick Stockton and Len Dawson
- Gamebook

Game information

First quarter

- SD – Rickey Young 1-yard run (Rolf Benirschke kick), 7:55 (SD 7–0)
- SD – Rolf Benirschke 40-yard field goal, 2:21 (SD 10–0)

Second quarter

- SD – Rolf Benirschke 26-yard field goal, 12:19 (SD 13–0)
- SEA – Don Testerman 5-yard pass from Jim Zorn (John Leypoldt kick), 6:41 (SD 13–7)
- SEA – Steve Largent 10-yard pass from Jim Zorn (John Leypoldt kick), 0:50 (SEA 14–13)

Third quarter

- SEA – Steve Largent 31-yard pass from Jim Zorn (John Leypoldt kick), 13:19 (SEA 21–13)
- SD – Rolf Benirschke 39-yard field goal, 7:48 (SD 21–16)

Fourth quarter

- SD – Charlie Joiner 17-yard pass from Dan Fouts (Rolf Benirschke kick), 13:50 (SD 23–21)
- SD – Fred Dean 22-yard interception return (Rolf Benirschke kick), 12:15 (SD 30–21)
- SEA – David Sims 16-yard pass from Jim Zorn (John Leypoldt kick), 7:00 (SD 30–28)

Top passers

- SD – Dan Fouts: 19/26, 199 yds, 1 TD, 1 INT
- SEA – Jim Zorn: 16/26, 291 yds, 4 TD, 2 INT

Top rushers

- SD – Rickey Young: 19 car, 80 yds, 1 TD
- SEA – Sherman Smith: 14 car, 56 yds

Top receivers

- SD – Charlie Joiner: 5 rec, 72 yds, 1 TD
- SEA – Steve Largent: 4 rec, 116 yds, 2 TD

Team – pass – rush – total – to

- SD – 192 – 131 – 323 – 1
- SEA – 281 – 109 – 390 – 3

==== Week 12: at Pittsburgh Steelers ====
Week Twelve: Seattle Seahawks at Pittsburgh Steelers – Game summary

Quarter	1	2	3	4	Total
Seahawks	0	3	10	7	20
Steelers	7	6	0	17	30

at Three Rivers Stadium, Pittsburgh, Pennsylvania

- Date: December 4
- Game time: 1:02 pm local
- Game weather: clear, 34 °F (1 °C), 62% humidity, wind NW 6 miles per hour (9.7 km/h)
- Game attendance: 45,429
- Referee: Cal Lepore
- TV announcers (NBC): Sam Nover and Mike Haffner
- Gamebook

Game information

First quarter

- PIT – Terry Bradshaw 5-yard run (Roy Gerela kick), 1:32 (PIT 7–0)

Second quarter

- SEA – John Leypoldt 20-yard field goal, 13:10 (PIT 7–3)
- PIT – Roy Gerela 22-yard field goal, 7:32 (PIT 10–3)
- PIT – Roy Gerela 28-yard field goal, 3:59 (PIT 13–3)

Third quarter

- SEA – Sam McCullum 65-yard pass from Jim Zorn (John Leypoldt kick), 11:09 (PIT 13–10)
- SEA – John Leypoldt 27-yard field goal, 9:02 (Tied 13–13)

Fourth quarter

- PIT – Roy Gerela 43-yard field goal, 14:52 (PIT 16–13)
- PIT – Lynn Swann 22-yard pass from Terry Bradshaw (Roy Gerela kick), 12:18 (PIT 23–13)
- PIT – Terry Bradshaw 3-yard run (Roy Gerela kick), 8:16 (PIT 30–13)
- SEA – Steve Largent 30-yard pass from Jim Zorn (John Leypoldt kick), 1:26 (PIT 30–20)

Top passers

- SEA – Jim Zorn: 10/30, 210 yds, 2 TD, 1 INT
- PIT – Terry Bradshaw: 13/21, 158 yds, 1 TD, 1 INT

Top rushers

- SEA – Sherman Smith: 12 car, 70 yds
- PIT – Franco Harris: 23 car, 103 yds

Top receivers

- SEA – Steve Largent: 4 rec, 71 yds, 1 TD
- PIT – Lynn Swann: 4 rec, 67 yds, 1 TD

Team – pass – rush – total – to

- SEA – 210 – 166 – 376 – 4
- PIT – 157 – 236 – 393 – 2

==== Week 13: at Kansas City Chiefs ====
Week Thirteen: Seattle Seahawks at Kansas City Chiefs – Game summary

Quarter	1	2	3	4	Total
Seahawks	14	20	0	0	34
Chiefs	21	0	3	7	31

at Arrowhead Stadium, Kansas City, Missouri

- Date: December 11
- Game time: 1:05 pm local
- Game weather: clear, 40 °F (4 °C), 64% humidity, wind SW 11 miles per hour (18 km/h)
- Game attendance: 22,262
- Referee: Fred Silva
- TV announcers (NBC): Jay Randolph and Andy Russell
- Gamebook

Game information

First quarter

- KC – Walter White 30-yard pass from Mike Livingston (Jan Stenerud kick), 10:19 (KC 7–0)
- SEA – David Sims 1-yard run (John Leypoldt kick), 7:46 (Tied 7–7)
- KC – Gary Barbaro 102-yard interception return (Jan Stenerud kick), 7:11 (KC 14–7)
- SEA – David Sims 5-yard run (John Leypoldt kick), 4:13 (Tied 14–14)
- KC – Ed Podolak 1-yard run (Jan Stenerud kick), 1:09 (KC 21–14)

Second quarter

- SEA – Don Testerman 5-yard run (PAT failed), 11:34 (KC 21–20)
- SEA – Sherman Smith 35-yard pass from Jim Zorn (John Leypoldt kick), 9:27 (SEA 27–21)
- SEA – Dave Brown 27-yard interception return (John Leypoldt kick), 1:12 (SEA 34–21)

Third quarter

- KC – Jan Stenerud 23-yard field goal, 10:13 (SEA 34–24)

Fourth quarter

- KC – Mark Bailey 1-yard run (Jan Stenerud kick), 12:26 (SEA 34–31)

Top passers

- SEA – Jim Zorn: 8/14, 133 yds, 1 TD, 2 INT
- KC – Tony Adams: 7/13, 135 yds, 2 INT

Top rushers

- SEA – Sherman Smith: 19 car, 86 yds
- KC – Ed Podolak: 21 car, 92 yds, 1 TD

Top receivers

- SEA – Sherman Smith: 3 rec, 63 yds, 1 TD
- KC – Larry Brunson: 3 rec, 95 yds

Team – pass – rush – total – to

- SEA – 133 – 209 – 342 – 5
- KC – 189 – 145 – 334 – 5

==== Week 14: vs. Cleveland Browns ====
Week Fourteen: Seattle Seahawks vs. Cleveland Browns – Game summary

Quarter	1	2	3	4	Total
Browns	6	10	0	3	19
Seahawks	0	7	0	13	20

at Kingdome, Seattle

- Date: December 18
- Game time: 1:02 pm local
- Game weather: indoors
- Game attendance: 61,583
- Referee: Jim Tunney
- TV announcers (NBC): Sam Nover and Floyd Little
- Gamebook

Game information

First quarter

- CLE – Terry Luck 4-yard pass from Greg Pruitt (PAT failed), 2:49 (CLE 6–0)

Second quarter

- CLE – Greg Pruitt 5-yard run (Don Cockroft kick), 14:14 (CLE 13–0)
- SEA – Sherman Smith 20-yard run (John Leypoldt kick), 8:45 (CLE 13–7)
- CLE – Don Cockroft 24-yard field goal, 0:36 (CLE 16–7)

Third quarter

- No scoring plays

Fourth quarter

- SEA – David Sims 5-yard run (John Leypoldt kick), 14:03 (CLE 16–14)
- CLE – Don Cockroft 33-yard field goal, 1:51 (CLE 19–14)
- SEA – Steve Largent 15-yard pass from Jim Zorn (PAT failed), 0:52 (SEA 20–19)

Top passers

- CLE – Terry Luck: 6/15, 105 yds, 4 INT
- SEA – Jim Zorn: 10/24, 132 yds, 1 TD, 2 INT

Top rushers

- CLE – Greg Pruitt: 22 car, 127 yds, 1 TD
- SEA – Don Testerman: 16 car, 79 yds

Top receivers

- CLE – Dave Logan: 4 rec, 78 yds
- SEA – Ron Howard: 3 rec, 40 yds

Team – pass – rush – total – to

- CLE – 101 – 259 – 360 – 5
- SEA – 132 – 191 – 323 – 2
