= General manager =

Oversees a firm's day-to-day business operations

A general manager (GM) is an executive who has overall responsibility for managing both the revenue and cost elements of a company's income statement, known as profit & loss (P&L) responsibility. A general manager usually oversees most or all of the firm's marketing and sales functions as well as the day-to-day operations of the business. Frequently, the general manager is responsible for effective planning, delegating, coordinating, staffing, organizing, and decision making to attain desirable profit making results for an organization.

In many cases, the general manager of a business is given a different formal title or titles. Most corporate managers holding the titles of chief executive officer (CEO) or president, for example, are the general managers of their respective businesses. More rarely, the chief financial officer (CFO), chief operating officer (COO), or chief marketing officer (CMO) will act as the general manager of the business. Depending on the company, individuals with the title managing director, regional vice president, country manager, product manager, branch manager, or segment manager may also have general management responsibilities. In large companies, many vice presidents will have the title of general manager when they have the full set of responsibility for the function in that particular area of the business and are often titled vice president and general manager.

In consumer products companies, general managers are often given the title brand manager or category manager. In professional services firms, the general manager may hold titles such as managing partner, senior partner, or managing director.

== Industry-specific usages ==
=== Hotels ===
In the hotel industry, the general manager is the head executive responsible for the overall operation of an individual hotel establishment including financial profitability. The general manager holds ultimate managerial authority over the hotel operation and usually reports directly to a regional vice president, corporate office, and/or hotel ownership/investors.

Some of the common duties of a general manager include are hiring and the management of an executive team, which consists of individual department heads, who oversee various hotel departments and functions, budgeting and financial management; creating and enforcing hotel business objectives and goals; sales management; marketing management; revenue management; project management; contract management; handling of emergencies and other major issues involving guests, employees, or the facility; public relations; labor relations; local government relations; and maintaining business partnerships.

The extent of duties of an individual hotel general manager vary significantly depending on the size of the hotel and company organization; for example, general managers of smaller boutique-type hotels may be directly responsible for additional administrative duties such as accounting, human resources, payroll, purchasing, and other duties that would normally be handled by other subordinate managers or entire departments and divisions in a larger hotel operation.

=== Sports teams ===
In most professional sports, the general manager is the team executive responsible for acquiring the rights to player personnel, negotiating their contracts, and reassigning or dismissing players no longer desired on the team. The general manager may also have responsibility for hiring and firing the head coach of the team.

For many years in U.S. professional sports, coaches often served as general managers for their teams as well, deciding which players would be kept on the team and which ones dismissed, and even negotiating the terms of their contracts in cooperation with the ownership of the team. In fact, many sports teams in the early years of U.S. professional sports were coached by the owner of the team, so in some cases the same individual served as owner, general manager and head coach.

As the amount of money involved in professional sports increased, many prominent players began to hire agents to negotiate contracts on their behalf. This intensified contract negotiations to ensure that player contracts are in accordance with salary caps, as well as being consistent with the desires of the team's ownership and its ability to pay.

General Managers are usually responsible for the selection of players in player drafts and work with the coaching staff and scouts to build a strong team. In sports with developmental or minor leagues, the general manager is usually the team executive with the overall responsibility for "sending down" and "calling up" players to and from these leagues, although the head coach may also have significant input into these decisions.

Some of the most successful sports general managers have been former players and coaches, while others have backgrounds in ownership and business management.

The term is not commonly used in Europe, especially in football, where the position of manager or coach is used instead to refer to the managing/coaching position. The position of director of football might be the most similar position on many European football clubs.

== See also ==
- Business manager
- Hotel management
- Hospitality management studies
- Managing Director
- Sports Illustrated Top 10 GMs/Executives of the Decade (in all sports) (2009)
- The Sporting News MLB Executive of the Year Award
- The Sporting News NFL Executive of the Year Award
- NBA Executive of the Year Award
- Jim Gregory General Manager of the Year Award (NHL)
- National Lacrosse League GM of the Year Award
