= The Sporting News Executive of the Year Award =

The Sporting News Executive of the Year Award may refer to:

- The Sporting News MLB Executive of the Year Award, baseball
- The Sporting News NFL Executive of the Year, American football
