= David Sims (running back) =

American football player (born 1955)

No. 35
- Position: Running back

Personal information
- Born: October 26, 1955 (age 71); Atlanta, Georgia, U.S.
- Listed height: 6 ft 3 in (1.91 m)
- Listed weight: 216 lb (98 kg)

Career information
- High school: Decatur (GA)
- College: Georgia Tech
- NFL draft: 1977: 7th round, 169th overall pick

Career history
- Seattle Seahawks (1977–1979)

Career NFL statistics
- Rushing attempts: 293
- Rushing yards: 1,174
- Rushing touchdowns: 19
- Stats at Pro Football Reference

David Sims (born October 26, 1955) is an American former professional football player who was a running back for three seasons with the Seattle Seahawks of the National Football League (NFL). He led the NFL in touchdowns in 1978 with 15, but suffered a career-ending injury early the next season. He played college football for Georgia Tech Yellow Jackets and was elected to the Georgia Tech Hall of Fame in 1985.

== NFL career statistics ==
Legend
	Led the league
**Bold**	Career high

Year	Team	Games		Rushing					Receiving				
Year	Team	GP	GS	Att	Yds	Avg	Lng	TD	Rec	Yds	Avg	Lng	TD
1977	SEA	**14**	1	99	369	3.7	17	5	12	176	**14.7**	**82**	**3**
1978	SEA	12	**9**	**174**	**752**	**4.3**	**44**	**14**	**30**	**195**	6.5	25	1
1979	SEA	3	3	20	53	2.7	8	0	4	28	7.0	13	0
		29	13	293	1,174	4.0	44	19	46	399	8.7	82	4
