= Keith Butler (American football) =

American football player and coach (born 1956)

No. 53
- Position: Linebacker

Personal information
- Born: May 16, 1956 (age 70); Anniston, Alabama, U.S.
- Listed height: 6 ft 4 in (1.93 m)
- Listed weight: 230 lb (104 kg)

Career information
- High school: Lee (Huntsville, Alabama)
- College: Memphis State
- NFL draft: 1978: 2nd round, 36th overall pick

Career history

Playing
- Seattle Seahawks (1978–1987)

Coaching
- Memphis (1990–1997) Linebackers, defensive ends & special teams coach; Arkansas State (1998) Defensive coordinator & linebackers coach; Cleveland Browns (1999–2002) Linebackers coach; Pittsburgh Steelers (2003–2014) Linebackers coach; Pittsburgh Steelers (2015–2021) Defensive coordinator

Awards and highlights
- As player: Seattle Seahawks Top 50 players; As coach: 2× Super Bowl champion (XL, XLIII)

Career NFL statistics
- Tackles: 813
- Interceptions: 8
- Sacks: 4
- Stats at Pro Football Reference
- Coaching profile at Pro Football Reference

John Keith Butler (born May 16, 1956) is an American former professional football player and coach in the National Football League (NFL). He played as a linebacker for 10 years with the Seattle Seahawks. Butler spent 23 years coaching in the NFL, predominantly with the Pittsburgh Steelers.

== College career ==
Butler played college football for the Memphis Tigers (University of Memphis since 1994), starting for three years at inside linebacker under head coach Richard Williamson. He had 384 career tackles and seven interceptions, leading the Tigers in tackles during his junior and senior seasons. Butler was named an AP All-American in his senior year and played in the Senior Bowl and Blue–Gray Football Classic.

== NFL career ==
Butler was the 36th selection in the 1978 NFL draft, taken by the Seattle Seahawks in the second round. He started 132 of 146 games in his ten-year career, and finished with 813 tackles (ranking second on the Seahawks' all-time tackles list).

== Coaching career ==
=== NCAA coaching career ===
Butler began his coaching career at his alma mater in 1990, coaching linebackers and later expanding his role to cover defensive ends and special teams by 1997. He was the architect of a surprise 3-4 defensive scheme which led to Memphis' shocking 1996 upset of the #6 Tennessee Volunteers, led by junior quarterback Peyton Manning. He then moved to Arkansas State in 1998 to serve as defensive coordinator and linebackers coach.

=== NFL coaching career ===
Butler’s professional football coaching debut came as a linebackers coach for the expansion Cleveland Browns in 1999. He was the only assistant coach retained after a staff turnover in 2001 and coached the next two seasons under Butch Davis, mentoring the expansion club's first ever Pro Bowl selection, linebacker Jamir Miller.

Butler moved to the Pittsburgh Steelers in 2003, serving as linebackers coach. He was instrumental in mentoring the development of the Steelers' renowned linebacking corps. His linebacker experience helped the Steelers consistently lead the NFL in rushing defense, total defense, and sacks between 2004 and 2012. Butler was influential in the development of Pro Bowl linebackers Joey Porter, James Farrior, Lawrence Timmons, LaMarr Woodley, and James Harrison. Harrison, in particular, improved from an undrafted practice squad linebacker into the NFL Defensive Player of the Year under Butler's tutelage.

During his twelve-year tenure as the Steelers' linebackers coach, Butler was considered the heir-apparent for the defensive coordinator position held by the respected Dick LeBeau. Following LeBeau's resignation, Butler was promoted to Defensive Coordinator on January 13, 2015. The Steelers defense was vastly improved in Butler's first season, increasing their sack total from the prior season 33 to 48, increasing their turnovers from 21 to 30, decreasing their points allowed by 4 per game, and leading the NFL in red zone turnovers.

One of the significant accomplishments during his tenure as Defensive Coordinator was that the Steelers “lead, or tied for the lead, in overall sacks for the last five years under Butler, setting an NFL record in 2020 when they did it a league-high four years in a row.” Butler announced his retirement from coaching on January 22, 2022.

== Personal life ==
Butler married his wife Janet in 1980 and together they have three adult sons, Blake, Brandon, and Brett. Both Blake and Brandon played college football: Blake played offensive line for the University of Memphis from 2002 until 2006, and Brandon played linebacker/defensive end for the University of Akron from 2003 until 2006, and later at Ashland University during the 2007 and 2008 seasons.
