= John Thompson (American football executive) =

American football executive (1927–2022)

Personal information
- Born: May 19, 1927
- Died: May 24, 2022 (aged 95); Las Vegas, Nevada, U.S.

Career information
- College: Washington

Career history
- Washington Huskies (1955–1960) Sports information director; Minnesota Vikings (1961–1970) Publicity director (1961–1965) Assistant general manager (1966–1970); National Football Conference (1971) Assistant to the president; National Football League (1971–1975) Executive director of management council; Seattle Seahawks (1976–1982) General manager

Awards and highlights
- NFL Executive of the Year (1978)
- Executive profile at Pro Football Reference

John Albert Thompson (May 19, 1927 – May 24, 2022) was an American football executive. He served as the first general manager of the Seattle Seahawks from 1976 to 1982.

== Early life and education ==
Thompson was born on May 19, 1927, and grew up in South Bend, Washington. In high school, he was valedictorian of his class. Thompson attended the University of Washington, but left before receiving a degree.

== Executive career ==
Thompson worked as an assistant to University of Washington sports information director Bert Rose and replaced him when Rose joined the Los Angeles Rams in 1955. He left after their win in the 1961 Rose Bowl over the Minnesota Golden Gophers.

In 1961, Thompson reunited with Rose, who was then the general manager of Minnesota Vikings of the National Football League (NFL). Thompson served as the team's publicity director until he was promoted assistant general manager in 1966.

In 1971, Thompson was named assistant to the president of the National Football Conference (NFC), who at the time was George Halas. After a few months in that position, he moved to the NFL management council in November 1971. He served as the executive director of the management council, the collective bargaining agent of the NFL, from 1971 to 1975.

In March 1975, Thompson was named the general manager for the new Seattle NFL franchise, which began play in 1976. Wellington Mara, a Pro Football Hall of Famer and owner of the New York Giants, said "Seattle could not have made a better choice. He has experienced success at every level of professional football. When my opinion was asked by the Seattle people, he was my only choice." Among the first tasks of Thompson was to pick the name of the team and colors. He decided to hold a fan vote to decide the name. The "Seahawks" had the most votes out of 20,365 entries with 1,741 different names. Thompson later oversaw the hiring of Jack Patera as head coach on January 3, 1976.

In his first season as general manager, the Seahawks compiled a record of 2–12. They went 5–9 in the following year, which was at the time the best record for an expansion team in their second season. The 1978 Seahawks were 9–7, at the time the best record for a third-year expansion franchise. For this, Thompson was named NFL Executive of the Year by Sporting News and Patera was named Coach of the Year. Seattle went 9–7 again in 1979, but declined in the following years, going 4–12 in 1980 and 6–10 in 1981, leading to the firing of both Thompson and Patera mid-season in 1982.

== Later life and death ==
Thompson was never again a member of an NFL team but did have a stint with the Sports and Events Council of the Greater Seattle Chamber of Commerce before announcing his retirement.

Thompson had three children with his wife Marilyn and was married to her for 71 years. He remained a fan of the Seahawks for the rest of his life after his stint with the team. He was a resident of the Seattle area until 2018, when he moved to Las Vegas, Nevada. Thompson died in Las Vegas on May 24, 2022, five days after his 95th birthday.
