= Ted Thompson =

American football player and executive (1953–2021)

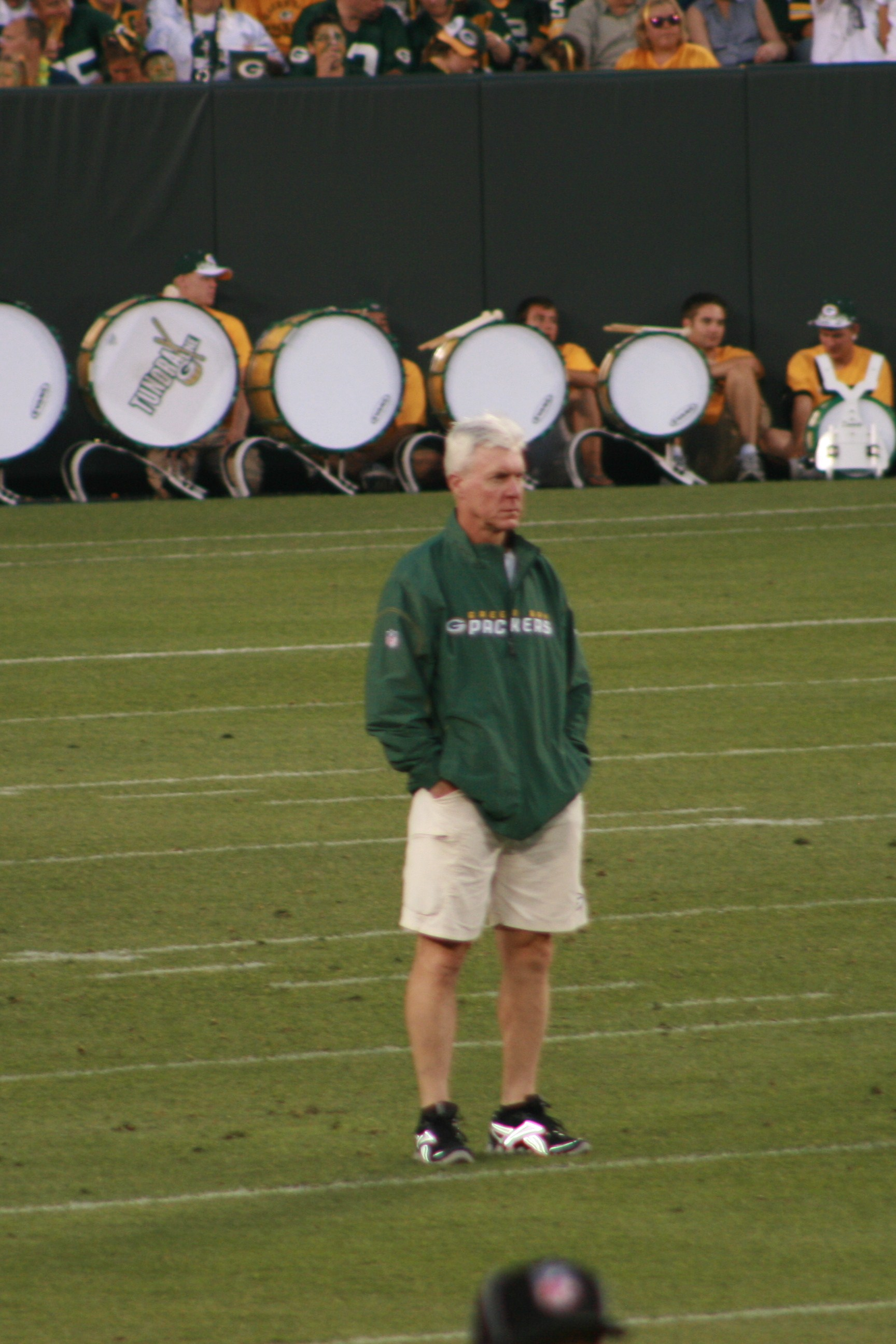
- Thompson in 2010

No. 51
- Position: Linebacker

Personal information
- Born: January 17, 1953; Atlanta, Texas, U.S.
- Died: January 20, 2021 (aged 68); Atlanta, Texas, U.S.
- Listed height: 6 ft 1 in (1.85 m)
- Listed weight: 220 lb (100 kg)

Career information
- High school: Atlanta
- College: Southern Methodist
- NFL draft: 1975: undrafted

Career history

Playing
- Houston Oilers (1975–1984)

Operations
- Green Bay Packers (1992) Assistant director of pro personnel; Green Bay Packers (1993–1997) Director of pro personnel; Green Bay Packers (1997–1999) Director of player personnel; Seattle Seahawks (2000–2004) VP of football operations; Green Bay Packers (2005–2017) General manager; Green Bay Packers (2018–2020) Senior advisor to football operations

Awards and highlights
- 2× Super Bowl champion (XXXI, XLV); 2× NFL Executive of the Year Award (2007, 2011); Green Bay Packers Hall of Fame

Career NFL statistics
- Games played: 146
- Games started: 8
- Fumble recoveries: 8
- Stats at Pro Football Reference
- Executive profile at Pro Football Reference

Ted Thompson (January 17, 1953 – January 20, 2021) was an American professional football player and executive in the National Football League (NFL). He was the general manager of the Green Bay Packers from 2005 to 2017. Thompson had a 10-year playing career in the NFL as a linebacker and special teams player with the Houston Oilers from 1975 to 1984.

Thompson first worked for the Packers organization from 1992 to 1999, first as assistant director of pro personnel, then their director of pro personnel from 1993 to 1997 and their director of player personnel from 1997 to 1999. He then served with the Seattle Seahawks as their vice president of operations from 2000 to 2004. He returned to Green Bay as their general manager in 2005. Over his career, Thompson won two Super Bowl titles, XXXI in 1997 and XLV in 2011. In May 2019, Thompson revealed that he had been suffering from an autonomic disorder. He died in early 2021.

== Career as a player ==
Thompson played college football at Southern Methodist University, starting three years at linebacker and intercepting seven passes during his career. During his senior year, he served as a team captain and was also the team's placekicker.

As an undrafted free agent in 1975, Thompson was signed by the Houston Oilers. The Oilers' general manager and coach was Bum Phillips, who had briefly coached Thompson at Southern Methodist. Thompson won a spot as a backup linebacker and special teams player and held this position for 10 years. He started nine games during his career, but he proved durable, playing in 146 of 147 games. In a 1980 game against the New York Jets, Thompson successfully converted four extra-point attempts as the emergency kicker.

== Front office ==
=== Green Bay Packers (scout) ===
In 1992, Thompson was hired by Ron Wolf as a scout for the Green Bay Packers. Thompson worked for the Packers through the 1999 season when former Packers' head coach Mike Holmgren recruited Thompson to join the Seattle Seahawks. During Thompson's time with the Packers as a scout, the Packers advanced to the playoffs six times, participating in two Super Bowls and winning Super Bowl XXXI.

=== Seattle Seahawks ===
Thompson worked for the Seattle Seahawks as vice president of football operations, also heading Seattle's scouting department and running the draft boards. He worked alongside former Packers and Seahawks coach Mike Holmgren, who was Seattle's GM at the time.

During Thompson's tenure in Seattle, the Seahawks advanced to the playoffs twice. In 2005, following Thompson's departure to the Packers, the Seahawks had one of their best success in team history, reaching the Super Bowl. Many of the players on Seattle's Super Bowl team were acquired under Thompson's direction, including HB Shaun Alexander, WR Darrell Jackson, OG Steve Hutchinson, CB Marcus Trufant, K Josh Brown and OT Sean Locklear.

In an interview with Mike Holmgren in 2009, Holmgren noted that "Once Ted Thompson came on board and we settled down a little bit, we started making good decisions."

=== Green Bay Packers (general manager) ===
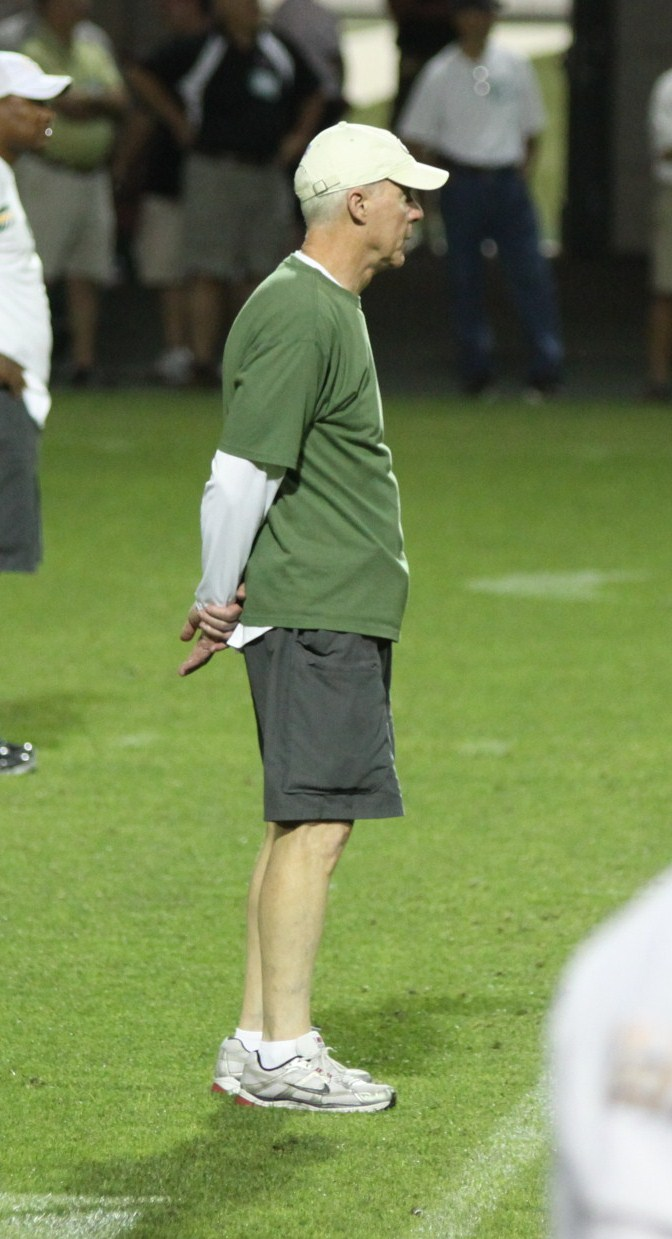
Thompson in August 2011

==== 2005 ====
Thompson replaced Mike Sherman as general manager of the Packers in 2005. When Thompson was hired the Packers were over the salary cap for the upcoming 2005 season. Some of Thompson's first decisions included declining to re-sign starting guard Marco Rivera and releasing starting guard Mike Wahle and starting safety Darren Sharper, three key components of the team's three-time NFC North division championship team. Thompson's first draft netted a quarterback in first round pick Aaron Rodgers, as well as defensive starters in safety Nick Collins and linebacker Brady Poppinga. The drafting of Rodgers was especially notable in that he had been expected to be selected much earlier in the draft but wound up falling to the late first round. In free agency following the draft, Thompson signed low-priced players, picking up guards Matt O'Dwyer and Adrian Klemm to make up for the losses of Wahle and Rivera. However, O'Dwyer was cut during training camp, and Klemm was benched towards the end of the season. Thompson acquired several free agents during the season that proved more successful, including running back Samkon Gado, tight end Donald Lee and wide receiver Rod Gardner. Still, the team struggled to overcome injuries at numerous offensive skill positions, most notably season-ending injuries to #1 running back Ahman Green, #2 RB Najeh Davenport and #1 wide receiver Javon Walker, and Green Bay finished the season with a 4–12 record, the worst record for the franchise since 1991.

==== 2006 ====
Thompson's first action during the 2006 offseason was the firing of head coach Mike Sherman, stating "This was more thinking in terms of where we are and where we need to get to." Sherman was replaced on January 12, 2006, by Mike McCarthy, who came to the Packers after previously serving in the role of offensive coordinator for both the San Francisco 49ers' 32nd-ranked offense and New Orleans Saints. McCarthy also served as quarterback coach for the Packers in 1999, giving him hands-on experience with franchise quarterback Brett Favre and some familiarity with Thompson. The hiring was considered a surprise to many in NFL circles, as McCarthy was not considered a prime head coaching candidate despite the number of head coaching vacancies.

The Packers entered the offseason with a league best $32 million available under the salary cap. However, Thompson elected not to retain several veterans including kicker Ryan Longwell, center Mike Flanagan, or linebacker Na'il Diggs. Thompson retained several other veterans, as the team re-signed Pro Bowl defensive end Aaron Kampman, running back Ahman Green, guard Kevin Barry and fullback William Henderson to new contracts. Thompson also was more active in free agency than he was in 2005, focusing mostly on defense by signing cornerback Charles Woodson from the Oakland Raiders, safety Marquand Manuel from the Seattle Seahawks, defensive tackle Ryan Pickett from the St. Louis Rams, and linebacker Ben Taylor from the Cleveland Browns.

In the 2006 NFL draft, Thompson amassed 12 picks and continued his restructuring on the defensive side of the football. With the fifth overall pick in the draft, Thompson selected linebacker A. J. Hawk from Ohio State. Thompson later added another Big Ten linebacker, Abdul Hodge from Iowa. Thompson also nabbed eventual starter Johnny Jolly with a 6th round pick. Thompson also addressed offensive deficiencies during the draft by nabbing wide receiver Greg Jennings, guard Jason Spitz and guard Daryn Colledge. Several of these draft picks contributed almost immediately to the Packers' lineup. Jennings, Colledge, Spitz, and Hawk started the entire year and a 5th round pick, Tony Moll, started 10 games in his rookie season while other offensive linemen were out with injuries. Jennings, Hawk, and Colledge were also selected to NFL's official all-rookie team.

==== 2007 ====
The 2007 season was a successful one for Thompson and the Packers. With a league-best $21 million available below the salary cap, the Packers' lone free agent signing in the offseason was former NY Giants cornerback Frank Walker. There were rumors indicating that the team was interested in trading for Oakland Raiders wide receiver Randy Moss, but Moss was instead dealt to the New England Patriots. Most notably, in September Thompson traded a 6th round pick in the 2008 NFL draft for New York Giants' running back Ryan Grant, who was starting by game eight and went on to have an outstanding season.

In the 2007 NFL draft, Thompson selected University of Tennessee defensive tackle Justin Harrell with the #16 overall selection in the first round. This move was a surprise selection to many fans because Harrell was not a widely known player, had a long history of injury, and many felt the team had more pressing needs. Fans and draft prognosticators also widely panned Thompson's selection of James Jones in the third round. Despite heavy criticism, Jones, and several of Thompson's other 2007 draft picks, played significant roles for the Packers during the 2007 season. Although Harrell was recovering from a college biceps injury, he played in the Packers' final five games. Harrell played in seven games in 2007, starting in two. James Jones served as the Packers' third receiver and finished third among rookies in receiving (47 receptions for 676 yards). Other notable members of the Packers' 2007 draft class include running backs Brandon Jackson and DeShawn Wynn, who were early season starters for the Packers, Korey Hall, who served as the team's starting fullback, safety Aaron Rouse, who tallied two interceptions while filling in for injured players, and kicker Mason Crosby, who led the NFL in scoring in 2007.

Despite the offseason criticism preceding the 2007 season, Thompson and the Packers were the surprise team of the NFL through the 2007 season, as they finished the regular season with a 13–3 record. The Packers made it to the NFC Championship game, losing to eventual Super Bowl champions the New York Giants, 23–20 in overtime.

Thompson was voted Sporting News NFL Executive of the Year for his 2007 work on March 25, 2008.

==== 2008 ====
The 2008 off-season and training camp was a rather rocky one for Thompson. While free agency was quiet, with the team's lone signing being linebacker Brandon Chillar, Thompson was at the center of a controversy surrounding quarterback Brett Favre's desire to unretire for the 2008 season. Favre, who announced his retirement on March 6, announce his desire to unretire after the 2008 draft in which the Packers selected two quarterbacks. Thompson, along with Packers' management and head coach Mike McCarthy, were adamant about their desire to move on with Aaron Rodgers as the team's new starting quarterback, with McCarthy stating "The football team has moved forward, the train has left the station". Favre, meanwhile, expressed frustration with Thompson regarding hiring and personnel decisions stating that he was only "guilty of retiring early". As a result, on July 11, 2008, Favre asked for his unconditional release from the Green Bay Packers. Thompson had repeatedly stated that the team would not release him and at the time were engaged in a standoff with Favre that could have ended with Favre taking up to a $25 million buyout to remain retired and participate in a marketing and merchandising role with the team.

On August 6, 2008, Thompson and Favre agreed on a trade and he was sent to the New York Jets for a conditional 4th round pick. The pick was to become a third-round pick if Favre took the majority of the team's snaps at quarterback, a second-round pick if he took 70 percent of the snaps and the team made the playoffs, and a first-round pick if Favre took 80 percent of the snaps at quarterback and the Jets reached Super Bowl XLIII. The Jets failed to make the playoffs but Favre took the majority of the team's snaps; so the 4th round pick became a 3rd round pick. Favre made the AFC Pro Bowl and led the Jets to a 9–7 record, while the Packers fell to 6–10 including losing 5 of their last 6 games of the season.

Besides the obvious controversy concerning the Brett Favre unretirement and trade, Thompson was considerably criticized by his decision in the 2008 offseason to waive punter Jon Ryan. After an excellent season, Thompson chose to waive the punter. The punter was quickly picked up by Seattle and had another impressive season while the Packers filtered though punters Derrick Frost and Jeremy Kapinos. Ultimately the loss of a good punter contributed to several momentum shifts during games due to poor punts aiding the Packers in achieving a 6–10 season.

==== 2009 ====
In the 2009 offseason, Thompson continued to uphold his philosophy to build through the draft, selecting NT B. J. Raji with the 9th overall pick. and then trading several picks to move up and select OLB Clay Matthews with the 26th overall pick. Later picks include eventual starters OG T.J. Lang, DE Jarius Wynn, and OLB Brad Jones. Raji, Matthews, and Jones made an immediate impact and all wound up as starters their rookie year. Matthews, Raji, and Lang developed into Pro Bowl players.

==== 2010 ====
In the 2010 NFL Draft, the Packers selected offensive tackle Bryan Bulaga in the first round. The Packers also drafted eventual starters safety Morgan Burnett, offensive tackle Marshall Newhouse, and running back James Starks. Important rotational players drafted include tight end Andrew Quarless and defensive end C. J. Wilson. The Packers also signed several notable free agents including rookie undrafted free agents cornerback Sam Shields, linebacker Frank Zombo, punter Tim Masthay, tight end Tom Crabtree and center Evan Dietrich-Smith. Other notable free agents include safety Charlie Peprah and outside linebacker Erik Walden.

The Packers went on to defeat the Pittsburgh Steelers 31–25 to win Super Bowl XLV. They became the first #6 seed from the NFC to win the Super Bowl, and second #6 seed to win the Super Bowl since the Pittsburgh Steelers in 2005.

On February 11, 2011, Thompson was re-signed to a multiyear contract extension.

==== 2011 ====
In the 2011 NFL draft, Thompson selected offensive tackle Derek Sherrod with the 32nd overall pick. Although several rookies, including Sherrod, received playing time their rookie year, only second round pick Randall Cobb (wide receiver and returner) made a significant impact. Linebacker D.J. Smith and running back Brandon Saine made smaller contributions as injury fill ins and special teams players. During the season, the Packers gave wide receiver Jordy Nelson a new contract.

The Packers allowed defensive end Cullen Jenkins to sign as a free agent with the Philadelphia Eagles.

The Packers went on to have a successful 15–1 regular season, but lost their first playoff game to the eventual Super Bowl champion New York Giants.

==== 2012 ====
After the Packers had a historically bad year on defense, allowing over 400 yards per game, the Packers went on to dedicate the offseason to improve their defense. After resigning tight end Jermichael Finley and cornerback Jarrett Bush they signed former New Orleans Saints Anthony Hargrove, former Miami Dolphins Phillip Merling and former Colt Daniel Muir. They also resigned linebacker Erik Walden. Thompson decided to let Pro Bowl center Scott Wells depart and brought in former Indianapolis Colts center Jeff Saturday. Backup quarterback Matt Flynn went to the Seahawks and backup cornerback Patrick Lee went to the Oakland Raiders. After Pro Bowl Safety Nick Collins went down during the season and was not cleared to play again the Packers decided to release him. They also released their longtime starter at offensive tackle Chad Clifton after he missed more than half of the games in 2011 and failed a physical before the Draft. The replacement safety Charlie Peprah was also cut at the beginning of training camp.

==== 2017-2021 ====
On January 1, 2018, it was reported that Thompson would no longer be the general manager of the Packers but would remain with the team in an advisory role. On January 2, it was announced that Thompson's new position would be the senior advisor to football operations.

On November 6, 2018, the Packers announced that Ted Thompson would be inducted into the Green Bay Packers Hall of Fame.

==== High draft picks ====
Position	Name	Round	Overall Pick	Year
QB	Aaron Rodgers	First Round	(No. 24 overall)	2005
S	Nick Collins	Second Round	(No. 51 overall)	2005
LB	A. J. Hawk	First Round	(No. 5 overall)	2006
WR	Greg Jennings	Second Round	(No. 52 overall)	2006
WR	James Jones	Third Round	(No. 78 overall)	2007
WR	Jordy Nelson	Second Round	(No. 36 overall)	2008
TE	Jermichael Finley	Third Round	(No. 91 overall)	2008
DT	B. J. Raji	First Round	(No. 9 overall)	2009
LB	Clay Matthews III	First Round	(No. 26 overall)	2009
WR	Randall Cobb	Second Round	(No. 64 overall)	2011
RB	Eddie Lacy	Second Round	(No. 61 overall)	2013
S	Ha Ha Clinton-Dix	First Round	(No. 21 overall)	2014
WR	Davante Adams	Second Round	(No. 53 overall)	2014
CB	Damarious Randall	First Round	(No. 30 overall)	2015
DT	Kenny Clark	First Round	(No. 27 overall)	2016

==== Low draft picks ====
Position	Name	Round	Overall Pick	Year
CB	Will Blackmon	Fourth Round	(No. 115 overall)	2006
DT	Johnny Jolly	Sixth Round	(No. 183 overall)	2006
LB	Desmond Bishop	Sixth Round	(No. 192 overall)	2007
K	Mason Crosby	Sixth Round	(No. 193 overall)	2007
G	Josh Sitton	Fourth Round	(No. 135 overall)	2008
G	T. J. Lang	Fourth Round	(No. 109 overall)	2009
RB	James Starks	Sixth Round	(No. 193 overall)	2010
CB	Davon House	Fourth Round	(No. 131 overall)	2012
DT	Mike Daniels	Fourth Round	(No. 132 overall)	2012
OT	David Bakhtiari	Fourth Round	(No. 109 overall)	2013
C	Corey Linsley	Fifth Round	(No. 161 overall)	2014
QB	Brett Hundley	Fifth Round	(No. 147 overall)	2015
LB	Blake Martinez	Fourth Round	(No. 131 overall)	2016

==== Minor free agent signings ====
Position	Name	Signed from	Year
RB	Samkon Gado	Signed as street free agent	2005
S	Marquand Manuel	Signed as a street free agent	2006
CB	Jarrett Bush	Claimed off waivers from the Carolina Panthers	2006
CB	Tramon Williams	Signed as street free agent	2006
FB	John Kuhn	Claimed off waivers from the Pittsburgh Steelers	2007
LS	J. J. Jansen	Signed as undrafted free agent	2008
C/G	Evan Dietrich-Smith	Signed as undrafted free agent	2009
S	Charlie Peprah	Signed as a street free agent	2010
P	Tim Masthay	Signed as street free agent	2010
CB	Sam Shields	Signed as undrafted free agent	2010
LB	Erik Walden	Signed as street free agent	2010
LB	Jamari Lattimore	Signed as undrafted free agent	2011
WR	Jeremy Ross	Signed as street free agent	2011
G	Don Barclay	Signed as undrafted free agent	2012
RB	DuJuan Harris	Signed as street free agent	2012
LB	Joe Thomas	Signed off Cowboys' practice squad	2015
CB	LaDarius Gunter	Signed as an undrafted free agent	2015
TE	Lance Kendricks	Signed as street free agent	2017
LB	Ahmad Brooks	Signed as street free agent	2017
DE	Chris Odom	Claimed off waivers from the Atlanta Falcons	2017
TE	Robert Tonyan	Signed as street free agent	2017
G	Jahri Evans	Signed as street free agent	2017

==== Major free agent signings ====
Position	Name	Contract Details	Year
DT	Ryan Pickett	Signed a four-year, $14 million contract	2006
CB	Charles Woodson	Signed a seven-year, $52.7 million contract	2006
LB	Brandon Chillar	Signed a two-year, $5 million contract	2008
C	Jeff Saturday	Signed a two-year, $7.75 million contract	2012
RB	Cedric Benson	Signed a one-year, $825,000 contract	2012
DE	Julius Peppers	Signed a three-year, $30 million contract	2014
DT	Letroy Guion	Signed a one-year, $825,000 contract	2014
TE	Jared Cook	Signed a one-year, $2.75 million contract	2016
TE	Martellus Bennett	Signed a three-year, $21 million contract	2017

==== Trades ====
Position	Name	Trade Details	Year
RB	Ryan Grant	Traded from Giants for a sixth-round draft pick in 2008	2007
DT	Corey Williams	Traded to Browns for a 2nd round pick in 2008	2008
QB	Brett Favre	Traded to Jets for a conditional 3rd round pick in 2009	2008
LB	Jay Elliott	Traded to Cowboys for a conditional seventh-round pick in 2018	2017

== Diagnosis with autonomic disorder ==
On May 8, 2019, Thompson announced that he had been diagnosed with autonomic disorder. He cited this reason for his resignation. Thompson died at his home in Atlanta, Texas on January 20, 2021, three days after his 68th birthday.
