= Mike Jones (linebacker, born 1954) =

American football player (born 1954)

No. 53
- Position: Linebacker

Personal information
- Born: July 12, 1954 (age 72); Chicago, Illinois, U.S.
- Listed height: 6 ft 3 in (1.91 m)
- Listed weight: 224 lb (102 kg)

Career information
- High school: Male (Louisville, Kentucky)
- College: Alcorn State
- NFL draft: 1975: undrafted

Career history
- Kansas City Chiefs (1975)*; Saskatchewan Roughriders (1975); Dallas Cowboys (1977)*; Seattle Seahawks (1977)
- * Offseason or practice squad member only

Awards and highlights
- Black college football national champion (1974)
- Stats at Pro Football Reference

Michael Jones (born July 12, 1954) is an American former professional football linebacker who played for the Seattle Seahawks of the National Football League (NFL). He played college football for the Alcorn State Braves.

== Early life ==
Michael Jones was born on July 12, 1954, in Chicago, Illinois. He attended Louisville Male High School in Louisville, Kentucky.

== College career ==
Jones enrolled at Alcorn Agricultural and Mechanical College in 1971 to play college football for the Braves. He was a three-year varsity letterman from 1972 to 1974. The 1974 Braves were black college football national champions.

== Professional career ==
Jones signed with the Kansas City Chiefs as a defensive back after going undrafted in the 1975 NFL draft. On September 6, during the 1975 preseason, Jones was waived by the Chiefs.

The Saskatchewan Roughriders of the Canadian Football League then signed Jones to a trial as a defensive halfback. He arrived at the airport in Canada only three hours before the game against the Calgary Stampeders on September 10. He made the game's roster in place of Ted Provost and played on special teams. Roughriders general manager Ken Preston said Jones was a very average player while Jones was still employed by the team. On September 21 against the Hamilton Tiger-Cats, three starters in the Roughriders' secondary (Jim Elder, Ken McEachern, and Provost) were out with injuries. Jones started against the Tiger-Cats but was beat deep twice by Terry Evanshen, on a 63-yard reception and later on a touchdown. Jones was released after the game in favor of Ray Odums. Jones had played in three games for the Roughriders overall in 1975.

Jones signed with the Dallas Cowboys in 1977. He was waived on August 29, 1977, after the fourth of six preseason games.

On September 29, 1977, Jones was signed by the Seattle Seahawks as a linebacker after Amos Martin was placed on injured reserve. Jones played in 12 games for the Seahawks during the 1977 season, mostly on special teams. He was waived on July 28, 1978.
