= Mike O'Brien (American football) =

American football player (born 1956)

No. 20
- Position: Defensive back

Personal information
- Born: April 25, 1956 (age 70); Kirkland, Washington, U.S.
- Listed height: 6 ft 1 in (1.85 m)
- Listed weight: 195 lb (88 kg)

Career information
- High school: Shorecrest, West Bremerton
- College: California
- NFL draft: 1978: undrafted

Career history
- Seattle Seahawks (1978–1979)
- Stats at Pro Football Reference

Michael Patrick O'Brien (born April 25, 1956) is an American former professional football player who was a defensive back for the Seattle Seahawks of the National Football League (NFL). He played college football for the California Golden Bears.
