= Duke Fergerson =

American football player (born 1954)

No. 89, 19
- Position: Wide receiver

Personal information
- Born: April 21, 1954 (age 72); Boise, Idaho, U.S.
- Listed height: 6 ft 1 in (1.85 m)
- Listed weight: 189 lb (86 kg)

Career information
- High school: Merced (Merced, California)
- College: Washington State; San Diego State
- NFL draft: 1976: 3rd round, 73rd overall pick

Career history
- Dallas Cowboys (1976); Seattle Seahawks (1977–1979); Buffalo Bills (1980); Los Angeles Rams (1983)*
- * Offseason or practice squad member only

Awards and highlights
- All-PCAA (1975); Second-team All-Coast (1975)

Career NFL statistics
- Receptions: 35
- Receiving yards: 543
- Receiving TDs: 2
- Stats at Pro Football Reference

Duke Fergerson (born April 21, 1954) is an American former professional football player who was a wide receiver in the National Football League (NFL) for the Dallas Cowboys, Seattle Seahawks and Buffalo Bills. He played college football for the San Diego State Aztecs and was selected in the third round of the 1976 NFL draft.

== Early life ==
Fergerson was raised by his single mother in Merced, California and attended Merced High School where he was a three-sport athlete. As a track runner, he recorded the second fastest low hurdle time in the history of high school track during his senior year.

He was even more successful as a football player, but dyslexia prevented him from earning a student-athlete scholarship. Even though he earned a diploma, his combined SAT score of 580 essentially qualified him as a functional illiterate at graduation.

== College career ==
To address his academic deficits, he enrolled at Merced College and made such progress in two years that Stanford, Washington State, UCLA, Duke, and the University of Alabama all offered him full athletic scholarships. He chose Washington State University to play college football and majored in Political Science with a minor in US History.

After his junior year where he had 10 receptions for 123 yards and one touchdown, he transferred to San Diego State University where his brother Nate was a wide receiver and because he felt the passing offense gave him a better chance at a professional career.

As a senior, he caught 57 passes for 886 yards and 4 touchdowns. Finishing as the NCAA's third leading wide receiver in receptions. He was selected to participate in the Senior Bowl, where he scored two touchdowns for the North squad. He also practice track and ran a 9.4 seconds 100-yard dash.

== Professional career ==
=== Dallas Cowboys ===
Fergerson was selected in the third round (73rd overall) of the 1976 NFL draft by the Dallas Cowboys. As a rookie, he tore a tendon in his right ring finger and was placed on the injured reserve list. The next year, he was traded to the Seattle Seahawks in exchange for a second-round draft choice (#54-Glenn Carano).

=== Seattle Seahawks ===
He started 8 games in 1977, but his career with the Seattle Seahawks was spent playing mostly on special teams. He was released on September 26, 1979.

=== Buffalo Bills ===
On September 2, 1980, he signed with the Buffalo Bills after a tryout. He scored 2 preseason touchdowns in his first season. He was cut on August 23, 1981.

=== Los Angeles Rams ===
In 1983, he signed with the Los Angeles Rams and was released on August 29.

== Personal life ==
After football, he began working for Farmers Insurance Group. He then moved on to work for Professional Asset Securities, whose primary line of business was to advise and manage excess liquidity for banks, foodservices companies, trusts and pension funds.

In 1986, Fergerson worked as a Ward Coordinator, political fundraiser and get-out-the–vote organizer for Joseph Patrick Kennedy II's first congressional run for political office. When Fergerson first began, he was assigned a district that had been strongly Democratic for many years, but in which Kennedy was only polling at 18 percent, the lowest ever for a Kennedy in Massachusetts. He was tasked with raising Kennedy's visibility by organizing rallies, leaflet drops, outreach to the many black churches in the area and fundraisers, including a highly successful Dizzy Gillespie concert. By election day, Kennedy went from 18% (third place) to 34.7%, winning the district by 2 votes.

For the next 10 years, Fergerson would be mentored by Pulitzer Prize winning author Doris Kearns-Goodwin and her husband Richard, the former presidential speechwriter for the late John F. Kennedy, the late New York Senator Robert F. Kennedy, Lyndon B. Johnson and Dr. Martin Luther King Jr.

Fergerson then entered Harvard Business School to earn an MBA in 1987. In the summer between June and September 1988, Fergerson worked for Congressional majority Whip Tony Coelho. In January 1988, Fergerson was awarded the Learner of the Month citation for overcoming illiteracy. On November 15, 1988, Fergerson was invited to Washington, DC to receive a citation from Governors William Jefferson Clinton and George Kean.

Before beginning his second year at Harvard, Fergerson was diagnosed with dyslexia and asked to withdraw from the MBA program. He then began working with the late film producer Harold Schneider. Upon Harold's death, he returned to the financial services industry to make a living, but continued to learn the film business.

In 1994, Fergerson joined the Al Checchi for Governor Campaign. Fergerson spent the next year and a half as one of Al's ‘kitchen cabinet’ advisers, a group that provided statewide advice for the campaign. He was campaign director for Orange County, San Diego County and Northern Mexico, a strategic trading partner for the State of California. After Checchi's defeat, in conjunction with the Staubach Real Estate Company, Fergerson worked to develop living wage opportunities for residents of Harlem.

When Fergerson discovered that Harlem had not had high school football for 62 years, he called all 13 Harlem-based principals and devised and presented a plan to the Chancellor of the NYCDOE that would unite them all into one community high school football team. The plan, which is currently used by the New York School system, is the blueprint by which the schools organize on all levels so that students can participate in combined community sports teams while continuing to attend their individual schools. It was originally believed that the plan would take 5–6 years to complete, but Fergerson, through his grassroots efforts and diligence within the community and partnership with Columbia University, was able to complete it in 9 months. Chancellor Klein signed the waiver allowing the Harlem Hell-fighters to organize as a scholar/athlete program to serve the needs of the at-risk urban males of color. Within three years of participating in the Public School Athletic League, Fergerson took the 2007 Hellfighters to the city championship game against John Adams High School, losing 58–42.

In January 2007, Fergerson became the only New York state high school football coach ever chosen to coach in the prestigious US High School Army All-America Bowl game in San Antonio, Texas. In March 2007, he was given a Lifetime Achievement Award by the Wheeler school in Providence, Rhode Island, and in September 2007, he was chosen by Universal-McCann Erickson and the US Army as a COI: Center of Influence in aiding the Army's urban outreach programs. He was asked to meet with the Secretary of the Army in January 2008 and travel to the Pentagon to meet with Army brass in April 2008.
