= Tony Benjamin =

American football player (born 1955)

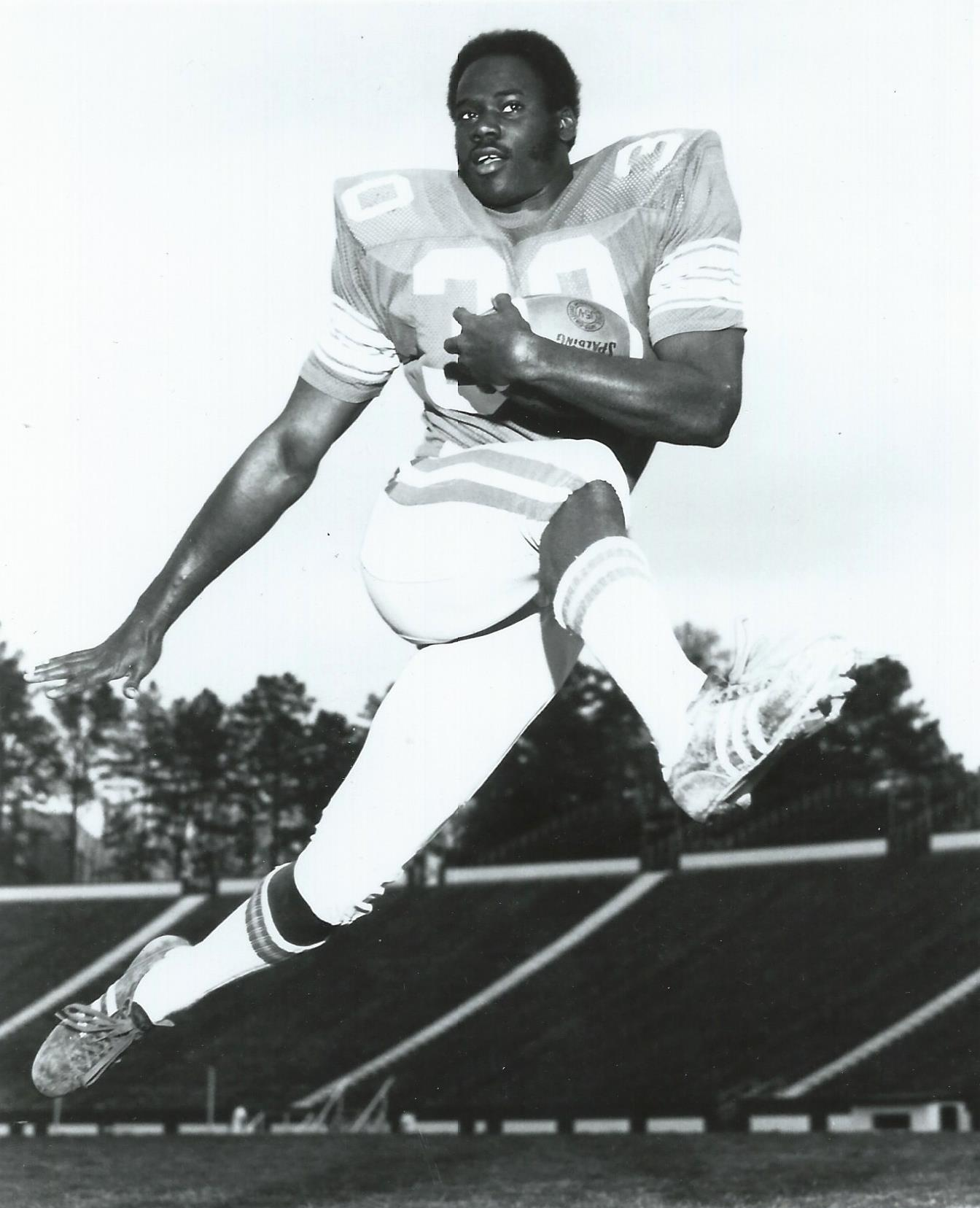

No. 31
- Position: Running back

Personal information
- Born: October 27, 1955 (age 71); Monessen, Pennsylvania, U.S.
- Listed height: 6 ft 3 in (1.91 m)
- Listed weight: 225 lb (102 kg)

Career information
- High school: Monessen
- College: Duke
- NFL draft: 1977: 6th round, 142nd overall pick

Career history
- Seattle Seahawks (1977–1979)

Career NFL statistics
- Rushing attempts: 19
- Rushing yards: 68
- Receptions: 6
- Receiving yards: 42
- Stats at Pro Football Reference

Tony Benjamin (born October 27, 1955) is an American former professional football player who was a running back for three seasons with the Seattle Seahawks of the National Football League (NFL) from 1977 to 1979. He played college football for the Duke Blue Devils.
