= Steve Myer =

American football player (born 1954)

No. 16
- Position: Quarterback

Personal information
- Born: July 17, 1954 (age 72); Covina, California, U.S.
- Listed height: 6 ft 2 in (1.88 m)
- Listed weight: 191 lb (87 kg)

Career information
- High school: West Covina (West Covina, California)
- College: New Mexico
- NFL draft: 1976: 4th round, 93rd overall pick

Career history
- Seattle Seahawks (1976–1979)

Career NFL statistics
- Passing attempts: 160
- Passing completions: 83
- Completion percentage: 51.9%
- TD–INT: 6–14
- Passing yards: 851
- Passer rating: 43.5
- Stats at Pro Football Reference

Steve Paul Myer (born July 17, 1954) is an American former professional football player who was a quarterback for four seasons with the Seattle Seahawks of the National Football League (NFL) from 1976 to 1979. He played college football for the New Mexico Lobos.

== See also ==
- List of NCAA major college football yearly passing leaders
