= The Sporting News NFL Executive of the Year =

Award

The Sporting News NFL Executive of the Year Award is given annually to the lead executive, typically a general manager, of an National Football League (NFL) team. The Sporting News first published their NFL Executive of the Year awards in 1955 and 1956, but it was discontinued. However, at the end of the 1972 NFL season, the Sporting News revived the award and has been given out almost every year since. The only exception since the revival was 2013, when no NFL executive was picked.

== Key ==
**Year**	Links to the article about that corresponding NFL season
**Player (X)**	Denotes winning executive and number of times they had won the award at that point (if more than one)
**Bold**	The winning executive's team was the NFL champion that same season
†	Member of the Pro Football Hall of Fame

== Award winners ==
Year	Name	Team
1955	Dan Reeves^{†}	Los Angeles Rams
1956	George Halas^{†}	Chicago Bears
1972	Dan Rooney (1)^{†}	Pittsburgh Steelers
1973	Jim Finks (1)^{†}	Minnesota Vikings
1974	Art Rooney^{†}	**Pittsburgh Steelers**
1975	Joe Thomas	Baltimore Colts
1976	Al Davis^{†}	**Oakland Raiders**
1977	Tex Schramm^{†}	**Dallas Cowboys**
1978	John Thompson	Seattle Seahawks
1979	Johnny Sanders	San Diego Chargers
1980	Eddie LeBaron	Atlanta Falcons
1981	Paul Brown^{†}	Cincinnati Bengals
1982	Bobby Beathard (1)^{†}	**Washington Redskins**
1983	Bobby Beathard (2)^{†}	Washington Redskins
1984	George Young (1)^{†}	New York Giants
1985	Michael McCaskey	**Chicago Bears**
1986	George Young (2)^{†}	**New York Giants**
1987	Jim Finks (2)^{†}	New Orleans Saints
1988	Bill Polian (1)^{†}	Buffalo Bills
1989	John McVay	**San Francisco 49ers**
1990	George Young (3)^{†}	**New York Giants**
1991	Bill Polian (2)^{†}	Buffalo Bills
1992	Ron Wolf^{†}	Green Bay Packers
1993	George Young (4)^{†}	New York Giants
1994	Carmen Policy	**San Francisco 49ers**
1995	Bill Polian (3)^{†}	Carolina Panthers
1996	Bill Polian (4)^{†}	Carolina Panthers
1997	George Young (5)^{†}	New York Giants
1998	Jeff Diamond	Minnesota Vikings
1999	Bill Polian (5)^{†}	Indianapolis Colts
2000	Randy Mueller	New Orleans Saints
2001	Dan Rooney (2)^{†}	Pittsburgh Steelers
2002	Bruce Allen	Oakland Raiders
2003	Scott Pioli (1)	**New England Patriots**
2004	Scott Pioli (2)	**New England Patriots**
2005	Art Rooney II	**Pittsburgh Steelers**
2006	Mickey Loomis	New Orleans Saints
2007	Ted Thompson (1)	Green Bay Packers
2008	Thomas Dimitroff (1)	Atlanta Falcons
2009	Bill Polian (6)^{†}	Indianapolis Colts
2010	Thomas Dimitroff (2)	Atlanta Falcons
2011	Ted Thompson (2)	Green Bay Packers
2012	Ryan Grigson	Indianapolis Colts
2013	Not awarded	
2014	Steve Keim	Arizona Cardinals
2015	Dave Gettleman	Carolina Panthers
2016	Reggie McKenzie	Oakland Raiders
2017	Howie Roseman	**Philadelphia Eagles**
2018	Ryan Pace	Chicago Bears
2019	Eric DeCosta	Baltimore Ravens
2020	Brandon Beane	Buffalo Bills
2021	Duke Tobin	Cincinnati Bengals
2022	Howie Roseman (2)	Philadelphia Eagles
2023	Brad Holmes	Detroit Lions
2024	Brad Holmes (2)	Detroit Lions
2025	John Schneider	**Seattle Seahawks**

== Multiple-time winners ==
List of multiple-time winners
Count	Coach	Seasons	Team(s)
6	Bill Polian	1988, 1991, 1995, 1996, 1999, 2009	Buffalo Bills (2) / Carolina Panthers (2) / Indianapolis Colts (2)
5	George Young	1984, 1986, 1990, 1993, 1997	New York Giants
2	Brandon Beane	2020, 2022	Buffalo Bills
2	Bobby Beathard	1982, 1983	Washington Redskins
2	Thomas Dimitroff	2008, 2010	Atlanta Falcons
2	Jim Finks	1973, 1987	Minnesota Vikings (1) / New Orleans Saints (1)
2	Brad Holmes	2023, 2024	Detroit Lions
2	Scott Pioli	2003, 2004	New England Patriots
2	Dan Rooney	1972, 2001	Pittsburgh Steelers
2	Ted Thompson	2007, 2011	Green Bay Packers
2	Howie Roseman	2017, 2022	Philadelphia Eagles

== See also ==
- List of NFL awards
