= 1980 Seattle Seahawks season =

American football team season

- Owner: The Nordstrom family
- General manager: John Thompson
- Head coach: Jack Patera
- Home stadium: Kingdome

Results
- Record: 4–12
- Division place: 5th AFC West
- Playoffs: Did not qualify
- All-Pros: None
- Pro Bowlers: None

The 1980 Seattle Seahawks season was the team's fifth season in the National Football League (NFL).

The 1980 season was a strange season for the Seattle Seahawks. The team started off 4–3, then lost the remaining nine games of the season. They accumulated four road wins but lost all eight regular season home games. The offense struggled, especially after losing Sherman Smith to a knee injury for the season. With the running game struggling, the team gave up 52 sacks, up from 23 in 1979. The offense went from 7th to 21st. Even though the defense improved from 27th to 13th, the Seahawks still gave up 405 points.

Memorable moments included a 26–7 road win against the Houston Oilers, intercepting Kenny Stabler five times; a 17–16 road win against the Kansas City Chiefs (their last at Arrowhead Stadium until 1990); and a 14–0 road win against the Washington Redskins, with the offense rushing for over 220 yards. All 4 of Seattle's wins were away games; the Seahawks failed to win a home game for the first (and so far only) time in franchise history.

More indicative of the season were the home losses: a 34–13 rout at home inflicted by the San Diego Chargers, a 37–31 loss to the New England Patriots, featuring several lead changes, as the Seattle defense could not hold on; losing to the Kansas City Chiefs 31–30, after going into the 4th quarter with a 23–10 lead, and the Chiefs intercepting Jim Zorn a season-high five times, leading to 17 Kansas City points. The low point of the season was a 27–21 loss to a struggling New York Giants team, one which finished 4–12 (although one was over the Cowboys). On Thanksgiving Day, November 27, the Dallas Cowboys defeated the Seahawks 51–7, in Dallas, but many people believe the Giants loss was worse.

The successes of the 1978 and 1979 seasons were long forgotten by the season's end.

== Offseason ==
=== NFL draft ===
1980 Seattle Seahawks draft
Round	Pick	Player	Position	College	Notes
1	10	Jacob Green *	Defensive end	Texas A&M	from Buffalo
2	44	Andre Hines	Tackle	Stanford	
4	97	Terry Dion	Defensive end	Oregon	
5	127	Joe Steele	Running back	Washington	
5	132	Daniel Jacobs	Defensive end	Winston-Salem State	
6	153	Mark McNeal	Defensive end	Idaho	
8	204	Vic Minor	Defensive back	Northeast Louisiana	
8	207	Jack Cosgrove	Center	Pacific	
9	238	Jim Swift	Tackle	Iowa	
10	265	Ron Essink	Tackle	Grand Valley State	
10	274	Billy Reaves	Wide receiver	Morris Brown	
11	292	Tali Ena	Running back	Washington State	
12	319	Presnell Gilbert	Defensive back	U. S. International	
Made roster * Made at least one Pro Bowl during career

=== Undrafted free agents ===
1980 undrafted free agents of note
Player	Position	College
Kevin Anderson	Guard	Oregon
Gary Carr	Running back	Fresno State
Steve Davis	Punter	Tennessee Tech
Mike Doerfler	Fullback	Montana State
Greg Feasel	Tackle	Abilene Christian
Mike Garrett	Punter	Georgia
Ron Gipson	Fullback	Washington
David Greenhalgh	Quarterback	Southwestern Oklahoma State
Eric Hill	Running back	Weber State
Dave Krieg	Quarterback	Milton College
Matt Kupec	Quarterback	North Carolina
Jack Lafferty	Center	Eastern Illinois
Mark McGrath	Wide receiver	Montana State
Arnie Pinkston	Defensive back	Yale
Brad Reid	Wide receiver	Iowa
Terry Rennaker	Linebacker	Stanford
Kirk Springs	Safety	Miami (OH)

== Personnel ==
=== Staff ===
1980 Seattle Seahawks staff
**Front office**: Managing general partner – Herman Sarkowsky; general manager – John Thompson; Assistant general manager – Mark Duncan; Director of player personnel – Dick Mansperger; Director of pro scouting – Chuck Allen; **Head coaches**: Head coach – Jack Patera; **Offensive coaches**: Offensive/quarterbacks/receivers – Jerry Rhome; Offensive backs – Andy MacDonald; Offensive line – Howard Mudd	**Defensive coaches**: Defensive/linebackers – Larry Peccatiello; Defensive line – Jim E. Mora; Defensive backs – Jack Christiansen; **Special teams coaches**: Special teams – Rusty Tillman; **Strength and conditioning**: Head trainer – Bruce Scott; Assistant trainer – Jim Whitesel

=== Final roster ===
1980 Seattle Seahawks roster
**Quarterbacks (QB)**: 12 Sam Adkins; 17 Dave Krieg; **10** Jim Zorn; **Running backs (RB)**: 36 Larry Brinson; **33** Dan Doornink; 24 Al Hunter; **43** Jim Jodat; 30 Lawrence McCutcheon; 32 Jeff Moore; **Wide receivers (WR)**: **80** Steve Largent; **84** Sam McCullum; 83 Steve Raible; **Tight ends (TE)**: 82 Mark Bell; **81** John Sawyer	**Offensive linemen (OL)**: **76** Steve August T; **72** Louis Bullard T; 64 Ron Essink T; 73 Andre Hines T; 54 Art Kuehn C; **61** Tom Lynch G; **78** Bob Newton G; 70 Jeff Sevy G; **51** John Yarno C; **Defensive linemen (DL)**: 63 Fred Anderson DE; 67 Bill Cooke DT; 62 Terry Dion DE; **79** Jacob Green DE; **77** Bill Gregory DE; **75** Robert Hardy DT; **74** Manu Tuiasosopo DT	**Linebackers (LB)**: **58** Terry Beeson MLB; **53** Keith Butler OLB; **55** Michael Jackson OLB; 52 Joe Norman OLB; 59 Terry Rennaker OLB; 56 Tim Walker MLB; **Defensive backs (DB)**: **22** Dave Brown CB; 25 Don Dufek SS; **44** John Harris FS; **26** Kerry Justin CB; 41 Will Lewis CB; 21 Vic Minor FS; **42** Keith Simpson SS; **Special teams (ST)**: 1 Efrén Herrera K; 18 Herman Weaver P	**Reserve**: 85 Mike Allen WR (IR); 68 Dennis Boyd T (IR); 50 Jack Cosgrove C (IR); 57 Peter Cronan LB (IR); 86 Jessie Green WR (IR); 71 Daniel Jacobs DE (IR); 35 Leroy King RB (IR); 89 Mark McGrath WR (IR); 16 Steve Myer QB (IR); 88 Brian Peets TE (IR); 47 Sherman Smith RB (IR); 34 Jim Walsh RB (IR); 38 Cornell Webster CB (Susp.); Rookies in italics 45 active, 13 reserve

- Starters in bold.

== Schedule ==
=== Preseason ===
Week	Date	Opponent	Result	Record	Venue	Recap
1	August 7	Atlanta Falcons	**W** 14–10	1–0	Kingdome	Recap
2	August 18	Miami Dolphins	**L** 7–24	1–1	Kingdome	Recap
3	August 23	at San Francisco 49ers	**W** 10–7	2–1	Candlestick Park	Recap
4	August 29	at New England Patriots	**W** 30–23	3–1	Schaefer Stadium	Recap

Source: Seahawks Media Guides

=== Regular season ===
Divisional matchups have the AFC West playing the NFC East.

Week	Date	Opponent	Result	Record	Venue	Recap
1	September 7	**San Diego Chargers**	**L** 13–34	0–1	Kingdome	Recap
2	September 14	at **Kansas City Chiefs**	**W** 17–16	1–1	Arrowhead Stadium	Recap
3	September 21	New England Patriots	**L** 31–37	1–2	Kingdome	Recap
4	September 28	at Washington Redskins	**W** 14–0	2–2	RFK Stadium	Recap
5	October 5	at Houston Oilers	**W** 26–7	3–2	Houston Astrodome	Recap
6	October 12	Cleveland Browns	**L** 3–27	3–3	Kingdome	Recap
7	October 19	at New York Jets	**W** 27–17	4–3	Shea Stadium	Recap
8	October 26	at **Oakland Raiders**	**L** 14–33	4–4	Oakland–Alameda County Coliseum	Recap
9	November 2	Philadelphia Eagles	**L** 20–27	4–5	Kingdome	Recap
10	November 9	**Kansas City Chiefs**	**L** 30–31	4–6	Kingdome	Recap
11	November 17	**Oakland Raiders**	**L** 17–19	4–7	Kingdome	Recap
12	November 23	at **Denver Broncos**	**L** 20–36	4–8	Mile High Stadium	Recap
13	November 27	at Dallas Cowboys	**L** 7–51	4–9	Texas Stadium	Recap
14	December 7	New York Giants	**L** 21–27	4–10	Kingdome	Recap
15	December 13	at **San Diego Chargers**	**L** 14–21	4–11	Jack Murphy Stadium	Recap
16	December 21	**Denver Broncos**	**L** 17–25	4–12	Kingdome	Recap
Note: Intra-division opponents are in **bold** text.

Source: 1980 NFL season results

== Standings ==
AFC West
	W	L	T	PCT	DIV	CONF	PF	PA	STK
^{(1)} San Diego Chargers	11	5	0	.688	6–2	9–3	418	327	W2
^{(4)} Oakland Raiders	11	5	0	.688	6–2	9–3	364	306	W2
Kansas City Chiefs	8	8	0	.500	4–4	6–8	319	336	W1
Denver Broncos	8	8	0	.500	3–5	5–7	310	323	W1
Seattle Seahawks	4	12	0	.250	1–7	3–9	291	408	L9

== Game summaries ==
=== Preseason ===
==== Week P1: vs. Atlanta Falcons ====
Preseason Week One: Seattle Seahawks vs. Atlanta Falcons – Game summary

Quarter	1	2	3	4	Total
Falcons	0	7	0	3	10
Seahawks	7	7	0	0	14

at Kingdome, Seattle

- Date: August 7
- Game time: 7:36 pm local
- Game weather: indoors
- Game attendance: 59,555
- Referee: Bob Frederic
- TV: KIRO
- Gamebook

==== Week P2: vs. Miami Dolphins ====
Preseason Week Two: Seattle Seahawks vs. Miami Dolphins – Game summary

Quarter	1	2	3	4	Total
Dolphins	7	0	0	17	24
Seahawks	7	0	0	0	7

at Kingdome, Seattle

- Date: August 18
- Game time: 7:30 pm local
- Game weather: indoors
- Game attendance: 59,550
- Referee: Fred Silva
- TV: KIRO
- Gamebook

==== Week P3: at San Francisco 49ers ====
Preseason Week Three: Seattle Seahawks at San Francisco 49ers – Game summary

Quarter	1	2	3	4	Total
Seahawks	0	0	0	0	0
49ers	0	0	0	0	0

at Candlestick Park, San Francisco

- Date: August 23
- Game time: 7:04 pm local
- Game weather: clear, 58 °F (14 °C), wind 5 miles per hour (8.0 km/h)
- Game attendance: 41,841
- Referee: Jim Tunney
- TV: KIRO
- Gamebook

==== Week P4: vs. New England Patriots ====
Preseason Week Four: Seattle Seahawks vs. New England Patriots – Game summary

Quarter	1	2	3	4	Total
Patriots	10	6	7	0	23
Seahawks	7	17	3	3	30

at Kingdome, Seattle

- Date: August 29
- Game time: 5:35 pm local
- Game weather: indoors
- Game attendance: 56,947
- Referee: Gene Barth
- TV: NBC
- Gamebook

=== Regular season ===
==== Week 1: vs. San Diego Chargers ====
Week One: Seattle Seahawks vs. San Diego Chargers – Game summary

Quarter	1	2	3	4	Total
Chargers	3	21	7	3	34
Seahawks	3	0	3	7	13

at Kingdome, Seattle

- Date: September 7
- Game time: 1:01 pm local
- Game weather: indoors
- Game attendance: 62,042
- Referee: Jerry Seeman
- TV announcers (NBC): Merle Harmon and Carl Eller
- Gamebook

Game information

First quarter

- SEA – Efrén Herrera 46-yard field goal, 12:05 (SEA 3–0)
- SD – Rolf Benirschke 41-yard field goal, 9:03 (Tied 3–3)

Second quarter

- SD – Greg McCrary 1-yard pass from Dan Fouts (Rolf Benirschke kick), 12:36 (SD 10–3)
- SD – Charlie Joiner 19-yard pass from Dan Fouts (Rolf Benirschke kick), 5:52 (SD 17–3)
- SD – John Jefferson 10-yard pass from Dan Fouts (Rolf Benirschke kick), 1:15 (SD 24–3)

Third quarter

- SEA – Efrén Herrera 28-yard field goal, 8:18 (SD 24–6)
- SD – John Jefferson 23-yard pass from Dan Fouts (Rolf Benirschke kick), 2:26 (SD 31–6)

Fourth quarter

- SEA – Sam McCullum 36-yard pass from Jim Zorn (Efrén Herrera kick), 13:17 (SD 31–13)
- SD – Rolf Benirschke 29-yard field goal, 1:50 (SD 34–13)

Top passers

- SD – Dan Fouts: 21/31, 230 yds, 4 TD
- SEA – Jim Zorn: 18/33, 235 yds, 1 TD, 2 INT

Top rushers

- SD – John Cappelletti: 16 car, 112 yds
- SEA – Sherman Smith: 10 car, 37 yds

Top receivers

- SD – John Jefferson: 6 rec, 103 yds, 2 TD
- SEA – Steve Largent: 5 rec, 62 yds

Team – pass – rush – total – to

- SD – 224 – 197 – 421 – 0
- SEA – 202 – 47 – 249 – 2

==== Week 2: at Kansas City Chiefs ====
Week Two: Seattle Seahawks at Kansas City Chiefs – Game summary

Quarter	1	2	3	4	Total
Seahawks	7	10	0	0	17
Chiefs	0	7	6	3	16

at Arrowhead Stadium, Kansas City, Missouri

- Date: September 14
- Game time: 1:00 pm local
- Game weather: clear, 75 °F (24 °C), 55% humidity, wind N 12 miles per hour (19 km/h)
- Game attendance: 42,403
- Referee: Dick Jorgensen
- TV announcers (NBC): Mike Adamle and Bob Trumpy
- Gamebook

Game information

First quarter

- SEA – Sam McCullum 12-yard pass from Jim Zorn (Efrén Herrera kick), 0:40 (SEA 7–0)

Second quarter

- SEA – Efrén Herrera 19-yard field goal, 9:05 (SEA 10–0)
- SEA – Sherman Smith 7-yard pass from Jim Zorn (Efrén Herrera kick), 1:55 (SEA 17–0)
- KC – Henry Marshall 1-yard pass from Steve Fuller (Nick Lowery kick), 0:06 (SEA 17–7)

Third quarter

- KC – Nick Lowery 50-yard field goal, 5:37 (SEA 17–10)
- KC – Nick Lowery 23-yard field goal, 1:15 (SEA 17–14)

Fourth quarter

- KC – Nick Lowery 57-yard field goal, 8:35 (SEA 17–16)

Top passers

- SEA – Jim Zorn: 17/27, 194 yds, 2 TD, 1 INT
- KC – Steve Fuller: 20/31, 184 yds, 1 TD

Top rushers

- SEA – Dan Doornink: 12 car, 32 yds
- KC – Ted McKnight: 9 car, 28 yds

Top receivers

- SEA – Sam McCullum: 6 rec, 96 yds, 1 TD
- KC – J.T. Smith: 5 rec, 78 yds

Team – pass – rush – total – to

- SEA – 187 – 122 – 309 – 2
- KC – 155 – 83 – 238 – 0

==== Week 3: vs. New England Patriots ====
Week Three: Seattle Seahawks vs. New England Patriots – Game summary

Quarter	1	2	3	4	Total
Patriots	3	17	7	10	37
Seahawks	3	14	0	14	31

at Kingdome, Seattle

- Date: September 21
- Game time: 1:00 pm local
- Game weather: indoors
- Game attendance: 61,035
- Referee: Pat Haggerty
- TV announcers (NBC): Bob Costas and Len Dawson
- Gamebook

Game information

First quarter

- NE – John Smith 19-yard field goal, 9:15 (NE 3–0)
- SEA – Efrén Herrera 33-yard field goal, 0:37 (Tied 3–3)

Second quarter

- SEA – Steve Largent 20-yard pass from Jim Zorn (Efrén Herrera kick), 10:24 (SEA 10–3)
- NE – Stanley Morgan 68-yard pass from Steve Grogan (John Smith kick), 10:02 (Tied 10–10)
- NE – Stanley Morgan 40-yard pass from Steve Grogan (John Smith kick), 6:31 (NE 17–10)
- SEA – Sam McCullum 22-yard pass from Jim Zorn (Efrén Herrera kick), 3:14 (Tied 17–17)
- NE – John Smith 30-yard field goal, 0:00 (NE 20–17)

Third quarter

- NE – Horace Ivory 20-yard run (John Smith kick), 1:43 (NE 27–17)

Fourth quarter

- SEA – Steve Largent 31-yard pass from Jim Zorn (Efrén Herrera kick), 14:46 (NE 27–24)
- NE – John Smith 29-yard field goal, 12:23 (NE 30–24)
- SEA – Sam McCullum 21-yard pass from Jim Zorn (Efrén Herrera kick), 8:57 (SEA 31–30)
- NE – Don Hasselbeck 16-yard pass from Steve Grogan (John Smith kick), 2:52 (NE 37–31)

Top passers

- NE – Steve Grogan: 15/24, 271 yds, 3 TD, 1 INT
- SEA – Jim Zorn: 20/36, 312 yds, 4 TD, 1 INT

Top rushers

- NE – Don Calhoun: 13 car, 77 yds
- SEA – Jim Jodat: 5 car, 42 yds

Top receivers

- NE – Stanley Morgan: 2 rec, 108 yds, 2 TD
- SEA – Steve Largent: 6 rec, 127 yds, 2 TD

Team – pass – rush – total – to

- NE – 271 – 203 – 474 – 1
- SEA – 299 – 134 – 433 – 2

==== Week 4: at Washington Redskins ====
Week Four: Seattle Seahawks at Washington Redskins – Game summary

Quarter	1	2	3	4	Total
Seahawks	0	7	0	7	14
Redskins	0	0	0	0	0

at RFK Stadium, Washington, D.C.

- Date: September 28
- Game time: 4:00 pm local
- Game weather: clear, 76 °F (24 °C), 60% humidity, wind S 11 miles per hour (18 km/h)
- Game attendance: 53,263
- Referee: Jim Tunney
- TV announcers (NBC): Dick Enberg and Merlin Olsen
- Gamebook

Game information

First quarter

- No scoring plays

Second quarter

- SEA – Jim Zorn 21-yard run (Efrén Herrera kick), 11:26 (SEA 7–0)

Third quarter

- No scoring plays

Fourth quarter

- SEA – Dan Doornink 8-yard run (Efrén Herrera kick), 1:56 (SEA 14–0)

Top passers

- SEA – Jim Zorn: 7/19, 86 yds, 2 INT
- WAS – Joe Theismann: 16/35, 200 yds, 4 INT

Top rushers

- SEA – Jim Jodat: 22 car, 117 yds
- WAS – Wilbur Jackson: 11 car, 33 yds

Top receivers

- SEA – Sam McCullum: 4 rec, 40 yds
- WAS – Ricky Thompson: 4 rec, 50 yds

Team – pass – rush – total – to

- SEA – 80 – 235 – 315 – 2
- WAS – 205 – 78 – 283 – 4

==== Week 5: at Houston Oilers ====
Week Five: Seattle Seahawks at Houston Oilers – Game summary

Quarter	1	2	3	4	Total
Seahawks	3	20	3	0	26
Oilers	0	0	0	7	7

at Astrodome, Houston, Texas

- Date: October 5
- Game time: 12:00 pm local
- Game weather: indoors
- Game attendance: 46,860
- Referee: Fred Wyant
- TV announcers (NBC): Don Criqui and John Brodie
- Gamebook

Game information

First quarter

- SEA – Efrén Herrera 32-yard field goal, 8:51 (SEA 3–0)

Second quarter

- SEA – Sam McCullum 22-yard pass from Jim Zorn (Efrén Herrera kick), 12:51 (SEA 10–0)
- SEA – Efrén Herrera 33-yard field goal, 10:10 (SEA 13–0)
- SEA – Sam McCullum 24-yard pass from Jim Zorn (Efrén Herrera kick), 9:35 (SEA 20–0)
- SEA – Efrén Herrera 50-yard field goal, 0:56 (SEA 23–0)

Third quarter

- SEA – Efrén Herrera 44-yard field goal, 10:25 (SEA 26–0)

Fourth quarter

- HOU – Mike Barber 22-yard pass from Ken Stabler (Toni Fritsch kick), 1:23 (SEA 26–7)

Top passers

- SEA – Jim Zorn: 12/22, 172 yds, 2 TD
- HOU – Ken Stabler: 23/50, 174 yds, 1 TD, 5 INT

Top rushers

- SEA – Jim Jodat: 12 car, 44 yds
- HOU – Earl Campbell: 12 car, 50 yds

Top receivers

- SEA – Sam McCullum: 4 rec, 80 yds, 2 TD
- HOU – Jeff Groth: 4 rec, 47 yds

Team – pass – rush – total – to

- SEA – 185 – 118 – 303 – 2
- HOU – 163 – 79 – 242 – 6

==== Week 6: vs. Cleveland Browns ====
Week Six: Seattle Seahawks vs. Cleveland Browns – Game summary

Quarter	1	2	3	4	Total
Browns	7	6	7	7	27
Seahawks	0	3	0	0	3

at Kingdome, Seattle

- Date: October 12
- Game time: 1:02 pm local
- Game weather: indoors
- Game attendance: 61,366
- Referee: Chuck Heberling
- TV announcers (NBC): Jay Randolph and Gene Washington
- Gamebook

Game information

First quarter

- CLE – Mike Pruitt 2-yard run (Don Cockroft kick), 3:58 (CLE 7–0)

Second quarter

- SEA – Efrén Herrera 29-yard field goal, 13:50 (CLE 7–3)
- CLE – Keith Wright 39-yard pass from Brian Sipe (PAT failed), 2:30 (CLE 13–3)

Third quarter

- CLE – Charles White 3-yard run (Don Cockroft kick), 6:45 (CLE 20–3)

Fourth quarter

- CLE – Mike Pruitt 22-yard run (Don Cockroft kick), 13:20 (CLE 27–3)

Top passers

- CLE – Brian Sipe: 12/24, 211 yds, 1 TD
- SEA – Jim Zorn: 23/29, 222 yds

Top rushers

- CLE – Mike Pruitt: 24 car, 166 yds, 2 TD
- SEA – Jeff Moore: 6 car, 37 yds

Top receivers

- CLE – Ozzie Newsome: 2 rec, 60 yds
- SEA – Sam McCullum: 5 rec, 61 yds

Team – pass – rush – total – to

- CLE – 211 – 176 – 387 – 1
- SEA – 205 – 118 – 323 – 1

==== Week 7: at New York Jets ====
Week Seven: Seattle Seahawks at New York Jets – Game summary

Quarter	1	2	3	4	Total
Seahawks	3	0	7	17	27
Jets	0	7	7	3	17

at Shea Stadium, New York

- Date: October 19
- Game time: 1:01 pm local
- Game weather: clear, 64 °F (18 °C), 70% humidity, wind W 10 miles per hour (16 km/h)
- Game attendance: 52,496
- Referee: Bob McElwee
- TV announcers (NBC): Charlie Jones and Len Dawson
- Gamebook

Game information

First quarter

- SEA – Efrén Herrera 48-yard field goal, 4:12 (SEA 3–0)

Second quarter

- NYJ – Mickey Shuler 4-yard pass from Richard Todd (Pat Leahy kick), 0:29 (NYJ 7–3)

Third quarter

- NYJ – Scott Dierking 20-yard pass from Richard Todd (Pat Leahy kick), 9:51 (NYJ 14–3)
- SEA – Jessie Green 32-yard blocked punt return (Efrén Herrera kick), 5:05 (NYJ 14–10)

Fourth quarter

- NYJ – Pat Leahy 22-yard field goal, 12:27 (NYJ 17–10)
- SEA – Efrén Herrera 23-yard field goal, 8:35 (NYJ 17–13)
- SEA – Jim Jodat 2-yard run (Efrén Herrera kick), 3:13 (SEA 20–17)
- SEA – Jim Jodat 1-yard run (Efrén Herrera kick), 2:06 (SEA 27–17)

Top passers

- SEA – Jim Zorn: 17/27, 258 yds
- NYJ – Richard Todd: 17/27, 198 yds, 2 TD, 2 INT

Top rushers

- SEA – Jeff Moore: 4 car, 40 yds
- NYJ – Scott Dierking: 18 car, 65 yds

Top receivers

- SEA – Sam McCullum: 5 rec, 107 yds
- NYJ – Derrick Gaffney: 5 rec, 91 yds

Team – pass – rush – total – to

- SEA – 244 – 85 – 329 – 0
- NYJ – 189 – 149 – 338 – 2

==== Week 8: at Oakland Raiders ====
Week Eight: Seattle Seahawks at Oakland Raiders – Game summary

Quarter	1	2	3	4	Total
Seahawks	0	0	0	14	14
Raiders	3	3	10	17	33

at Oakland–Alameda County Coliseum, Oakland, California

- Date: October 26
- Game time: 1:01 pm local
- Game weather: clear, 63 °F (17 °C), 73% humidity, wind SW 5 miles per hour (8.0 km/h)
- Game attendance: 50,185
- Referee: Cal Lepore
- TV announcers (NBC): Sam Nover and Bob Trumpy
- Gamebook

Game information

First quarter

- OAK – Chris Bahr 34-yard field goal, 1:44 (OAK 3–0)

Second quarter

- OAK – Chris Bahr 38-yard field goal, 10:59 (OAK 6–0)

Third quarter

- OAK – Chris Bahr 30-yard field goal, 11:47 (OAK 9–0)
- OAK – Bob Chandler 5-yard pass from Jim Plunkett (Chris Bahr kick), 8:10 (OAK 16–0)

Fourth quarter

- OAK – Bob Chandler 12-yard pass from Jim Plunkett (Chris Bahr kick), 14:07 (OAK 23–0)
- SEA – Lawrence McCutcheon 1-yard run (Efrén Herrera kick), 10:52 (OAK 23–7)
- OAK – Bob Chandler 23-yard pass from Jim Plunkett (Chris Bahr kick), 8:51 (OAK 30–7)
- SEA – Steve Largent 67-yard pass from Jim Zorn (Efrén Herrera kick), 7:55 (OAK 30–14)
- OAK – Chris Bahr 25-yard field goal, 2:44 (OAK 33–14)

Top passers

- SEA – Jim Zorn: 17/33, 282 yds, 1 TD, 2 INT
- OAK – Jim Plunkett: 16/25, 214 yds, 3 TD

Top rushers

- SEA – Jeff Moore: 6 car, 9 yds
- OAK – Mark van Eeghen: 17 car, 75 yds

Top receivers

- SEA – Steve Largent: 4 rec, 142 yds, 1 TD
- OAK – Bob Chandler: 5 rec, 75 yds, 3 TD

Team – pass – rush – total – to

- SEA – 238 – 25 – 263 – 3
- OAK – 201 – 138 – 339 – 1

==== Week 9: vs. Philadelphia Eagles ====
Week Nine: Seattle Seahawks vs. Philadelphia Eagles – Game summary

Quarter	1	2	3	4	Total
Eagles	0	7	10	10	27
Seahawks	6	0	7	7	20

at Kingdome, Seattle

- Date: November 2
- Game time: 1:02 pm local
- Game weather: indoors
- Game attendance: 61,047
- Referee: Jerry Markbreit
- TV announcers (CBS): Gary Bender and John Madden
- Gamebook

Game information

First quarter

- SEA – Efrén Herrera 21-yard field goal, 4:40 (SEA 3–0)
- SEA – Efrén Herrera 31-yard field goal, 0:04 (SEA 6–0)

Second quarter

- PHI – Billy Campfield 1-yard run (Tony Franklin kick), 0:58 (PHI 7–6)

Third quarter

- SEA – Steve Largent 27-yard pass from Jim Zorn (Efrén Herrera kick), 12:18 (SEA 13–6)
- PHI – Charlie Smith 15-yard pass from Ron Jaworski (Tony Franklin kick), 4:57 (PHI 14–13)
- PHI – Tony Franklin 39-yard field goal, 0:54 (PHI 17–13)

Fourth quarter

- SEA – Dan Doornink 9-yard run (Efrén Herrera kick), 11:40 (SEA 20–17)
- PHI – Billy Campfield 5-yard run (Tony Franklin kick), 2:43 (PHI 24–20)
- PHI – Tony Franklin 25-yard field goal, 1:30 (PHI 27–20)

Top passers

- PHI – Ron Jaworski: 19/30, 253 yds, 2 TD, 1 INT
- SEA – Jim Zorn: 20/35, 250 yds, 1 TD

Top rushers

- PHI – Leroy Harris: 12 car, 39 yds
- SEA – Dan Doornink: 7 car, 44 yds, 1 TD

Top receivers

- PHI – Charlie Smith: 5 rec, 109 yds, 1 TD
- SEA – Steve Largent: 6 rec, 101 yds, 1 TD

Team – pass – rush – total – to

- PHI – 248 – 115 – 363 – 2
- SEA – 220 – 103 – 323 – 0

==== Week 10: vs. Kansas City Chiefs ====
Week Ten: Seattle Seahawks vs. Kansas City Chiefs – Game summary

Quarter	1	2	3	4	Total
Chiefs	3	0	7	21	31
Seahawks	0	17	6	7	30

at Kingdome, Seattle

- Date: November 9
- Game time: 1:03 pm local
- Game weather: indoors
- Game attendance: 58,976
- Referee: Jim Tunney
- TV announcers (NBC): Mike Adamle and Mike Haffner
- Gamebook

Game information

First quarter

- KC – Nick Lowery 42-yard field goal, 3:51 (KC 3–0)

Second quarter

- SEA – Larry Brinson 22-yard run (Efrén Herrera kick), 4:42 (SEA 7–3)
- SEA – Efrén Herrera 39-yard field goal, 1:34 (SEA 10–3)
- SEA – Dan Doornink 4-yard pass from Jim Zorn (Efrén Herrera kick), 0:02 (SEA 17–3)

Third quarter

- KC – Tony Reed 12-yard pass from Steve Fuller (Nick Lowery kick), 14:34 (SEA 17–10)
- SEA – Efrén Herrera 31-yard field goal, 9:23 (SEA 20–10)
- SEA – Efrén Herrera 33-yard field goal, 3:39 (SEA 23–10)

Fourth quarter

- KC – Henry Marshall 11-yard pass from Steve Fuller (Nick Lowery kick), 12:44 (SEA 23–17)
- KC – Frank Manumaleuga 22-yard interception return (Nick Lowery kick), 11:33 (KC 24–23)
- SEA – Jim Jodat 2-yard run (Efrén Herrera kick), 4:10 (SEA 30–24)
- KC – Arnold Morgado 1-yard run (Nick Lowery kick), 0:40 (KC 31–30)

Top passers

- KC – Steve Fuller: 19/26, 233 yds, 2 TD, 2 INT
- SEA – Jim Zorn: 18/37, 189 yds, 1 TD, 5 INT

Top rushers

- KC – Ted McKnight: 12 car, 26 yds
- SEA – Jim Jodat: 15 car, 57 yds, 1 TD

Top receivers

- KC – Tony Reed: 6 rec, 73 yds, 1 TD
- SEA – Sam McCullum: 4 rec, 57 yds

Team – pass – rush – total – to

- KC – 216 – 81 – 297 – 4
- SEA – 192 – 130 – 322 – 5

==== Week 11: vs. Oakland Raiders ====
Week Eleven: Seattle Seahawks vs. Oakland Raiders – Game summary

Quarter	1	2	3	4	Total
Raiders	0	0	7	12	19
Seahawks	0	7	7	3	17

at Kingdome, Seattle

- Date: November 17
- Game time: 6:06 pm local
- Game weather: indoors
- Game attendance: 60,480
- Referee: Fred Silva
- TV announcers (ABC): Frank Gifford, Don Meredith, and Howard Cosell
- Gamebook

Game information

First quarter

- No scoring plays

Second quarter

- SEA – Lawrence McCutcheon 1-yard run (Efrén Herrera kick), 0:23 (SEA 7–0)

Third quarter

- SEA – Dan Doornink 8-yard pass from Jim Zorn (Efrén Herrera kick), 8:52 (SEA 14–0)
- OAK – Arthur Whittington 10-yard run (Chris Bahr kick), 7:03 (SEA 14–7)

Fourth quarter

- SEA – Efrén Herrera 37-yard field goal, 14:56 (SEA 17–7)
- OAK – Safety, Ted Hendricks blocked punt out of end zone, 10:28 (SEA 17–9)
- OAK – Mark van Eeghen 1-yard run (Chris Bahr kick), 8:30 (SEA 17–16)
- OAK – Chris Bahr 28-yard field goal, 0:56 (OAK 19–17)

Top passers

- OAK – Jim Plunkett: 9/22, 135 yds, 1 INT
- SEA – Jim Zorn: 19/35, 250 yds, 1 TD, 2 INT

Top rushers

- OAK – Arthur Whittington: 10 car, 54 yds
- SEA – Jim Jodat: 12 car, 48 yds

Top receivers

- OAK – Derrick Ramsey: 2 rec, 76 yds
- SEA – Steve Largent: 5 rec, 68 yds

Team – pass – rush – total – to

- OAK – 110 – 117 – 227 – 2
- SEA – 233 – 158 – 391 – 2

==== Week 12: at Denver Broncos ====
Week Twelve: Seattle Seahawks at Denver Broncos – Game summary

Quarter	1	2	3	4	Total
Seahawks	0	10	0	10	20
Broncos	7	10	3	16	36

at Mile High Stadium, Denver, Colorado

- Date: November 23
- Game time: 2:00 pm local
- Game weather: cloudy, 34 °F (1 °C), 69% humidity, wind E 9 miles per hour (14 km/h)
- Game attendance: 73,274
- Referee: Jerry Seeman
- TV announcers (NBC): Charlie Jones and Len Dawson
- Gamebook

Game information

First quarter

- DEN – Riley Odoms 2-yard pass from Craig Morton (Fred Steinfort kick), 2:53 (DEN 7–0)

Second quarter

- SEA – Efrén Herrera 21-yard field goal, 13:04 (DEN 7–3)
- SEA – Will Lewis 75-yard punt return (Efrén Herrera kick), 8:46 (SEA 10–7)
- DEN – Fred Steinfort 24-yard field goal, 4:02 (Tied 10–10)
- DEN – Craig Morton 1-yard run (Fred Steinfort kick), 1:19 (DEN 17–10)

Third quarter

- DEN – Fred Steinfort 33-yard field goal, 6:31 (DEN 20–10)

Fourth quarter

- SEA – Efrén Herrera 20-yard field goal, 14:57 (DEN 20–13)
- DEN – Haven Moses 27-yard pass from Craig Morton (Fred Steinfort kick), 11:28 (DEN 27–13)
- DEN – Don Latimer 15-yard interception return (Fred Steinfort kick), 7:20 (DEN 34–13)
- DEN – Safety, Jones tackled Jim Zorn in end zone, 6:07 (DEN 36–13)
- SEA – Lawrence McCutcheon 5-yard pass from Sam Adkins (Efrén Herrera kick), 0:12 (DEN 36–20)

Top passers

- SEA – Jim Zorn: 12/18, 147 yds, 2 INT
- DEN – Craig Morton: 19/28, 192 yds, 2 TD, 1 INT

Top rushers

- SEA – Jim Zorn: 3 car, 25 yds
- DEN – Jon Keyworth: 11 car, 28 yds

Top receivers

- SEA – Steve Largent: 4 rec, 83 yds
- DEN – Riley Odoms: 6 rec, 92 yds, 1 TD

Team – pass – rush – total – to

- SEA – 151 – 69 – 220 – 5
- DEN – 200 – 76 – 276 – 3

==== Week 13: at Dallas Cowboys ====
Week Thirteen: Seattle Seahawks at Dallas Cowboys – Game summary

Quarter	1	2	3	4	Total
Seahawks	0	0	0	7	7
Cowboys	9	21	0	21	51

at Texas Stadium, Irving, Texas

- Date: November 27
- Game time: 3:00 pm local
- Game weather: partly cloudy, 49 °F (9 °C), 52% humidity, wind WNW 17 miles per hour (27 km/h)
- Game attendance: 57,540
- Referee: Pat Haggerty
- TV announcers (NBC): Dick Enberg and Merlin Olsen
- Gamebook

Game information

First quarter

- DAL – Tony Hill 18-yard pass from Danny White (Rafael Septién kick), 3:48 (DAL 7–0)
- DAL – Safety, Jim Zorn intentional grounding in end zone, 3:29 (DAL 9–0)

Second quarter

- DAL – Billy Joe DuPree 14-yard pass from Danny White (Rafael Septien kick), 14:09 (DAL 16–0)
- DAL – Ron Springs 1-yard run (Rafael Septien kick), 11:57 (DAL 23–0)
- DAL – Robert Newhouse 1-yard run (Rafael Septien kick), 1:57 (DAL 30–0)

Third quarter

- No scoring plays

Fourth quarter

- DAL – Tony Dorsett 1-yard run (Rafael Septien kick), 14:10 (DAL 37–0)
- DAL – Tony Dorsett 1-yard run (Rafael Septien kick), 11:03 (DAL 44–0)
- DAL – Billy Joe DuPree 14-yard pass from Glenn Carano (Rafael Septien kick), 9:23 (DAL 51–0)
- SEA – Ron Essink 2-yard pass from Jim Zorn (Efrén Herrera kick), 2:37 (DAL 51–7)

Top passers

- SEA – Jim Zorn: 12/25, 110 yds, 1 TD, 1 INT
- DAL – Danny White: 11/18, 120 yds, 2 TD, 2 INT

Top rushers

- SEA – Lawrence McCutcheon: 11 car, 95 yds
- DAL – Tony Dorsett: 18 car, 100 yds, 1 TD

Top receivers

- SEA – Sam McCullum: 3 rec, 35 yds
- DAL – Tony Dorsett: 4 rec, 44 yds

Team – pass – rush – total – to

- SEA – 84 – 148 – 232 – 7
- DAL – 125 – 200 – 325 – 2

==== Week 14: vs. New York Giants ====
Week Fourteen: Seattle Seahawks vs. New York Giants – Game summary

Quarter	1	2	3	4	Total
Giants	3	10	0	14	27
Seahawks	0	7	7	7	21

at Kingdome, Seattle

- Date: December 7
- Game time: 1:04 pm local
- Game weather: indoors
- Game attendance: 51,617
- Referee: Gordon McCarter
- TV announcers (CBS): Curt Gowdy and Hank Stram
- Gamebook

Game information

First quarter

- NYG – Joe Danelo 43-yard field goal, 9:37 (NYG 3–0)

Second quarter

- NYG – Joe Danelo 32-yard field goal, 11:52 (NYG 6–0)
- NYG – Earnest Gray 48-yard pass from Scott Brunner (Joe Danelo kick), 10:20 (NYG 13–0)
- SEA – Dan Doornink 1-yard run (Efrén Herrera kick), 2:31 (NYG 13–7)

Third quarter

- SEA – Jim Jodat 1-yard run (Efrén Herrera kick), 6:20 (SEA 14–13)

Fourth quarter

- NYG – Earnest Gray 50-yard pass from Scott Brunner (Joe Danelo kick), 11:47 (NYG 20–14)
- SEA – Steve Largent 34-yard pass from Jim Zorn (Efrén Herrera kick), 7:59 (SEA 21–20)
- NYG – Billy Taylor 30-yard run (Joe Danelo kick), 1:57 (NYG 27–21)

Top passers

- NYG – Scott Brunner: 8/18, 161 yds, 2 TD, 1 INT
- SEA – Jim Zorn: 20/37, 238 yds, 1 TD

Top rushers

- NYG – Billy Taylor: 19 car, 103 yds, 1 TD
- SEA – Jim Jodat: 12 car, 72 yds, 1 TD

Top receivers

- NYG – Earnest Gray: 3 rec, 114 yds, 2 TD
- SEA – Steve Largent: 8 rec, 139 yds, 1 TD

Team – pass – rush – total – to

- NYG – 161 – 150 – 311 – 2
- SEA – 221 – 116 – 337 – 2

==== Week 15: at San Diego Chargers ====
Week Fifteen: Seattle Seahawks at San Diego Chargers – Game summary

Quarter	1	2	3	4	Total
Seahawks	0	0	7	7	14
Chargers	0	21	0	0	21

at San Diego Stadium, San Diego, California

- Date: December 13
- Game time: 1:01 pm local
- Game weather: clear, 72 °F (22 °C), 48% humidity, wind SW 5 miles per hour (8.0 km/h)
- Game attendance: 49,980
- Referee: Red Cashion
- TV announcers (NBC): Charlie Jones and Len Dawson
- Gamebook

Game information

First quarter

- No scoring plays

Second quarter

- SD – Chuck Muncie 1-yard run (Rolf Benirschke kick), 14:58 (SD 7–0)
- SD – Chuck Muncie 10-yard run (Rolf Benirschke kick), 11:21 (SD 14–0)
- SD – John Jefferson 19-yard pass from Dan Fouts (Rolf Benirschke kick), 1:53 (SD 21–0)

Third quarter

- SEA – Jim Jodat 15-yard run (Efrén Herrera kick), 3:30 (SD 21–7)

Fourth quarter

- SEA – Steve Largent 2-yard pass from Jim Zorn (Efrén Herrera kick), 0:00 (SD 21–14)

Top passers

- SEA – Jim Zorn: 22/42, 179 yds, 1 TD
- SD – Dan Fouts: 28/42, 339 yds, 1 TD, 2 INT

Top rushers

- SEA – Jim Jodat: 7 car, 36 yds, 1 TD
- SD – Chuck Muncie: 13 car, 42 yds, 2 TD

Top receivers

- SEA – Steve Largent: 5 rec, 55 yds, 1 TD
- SD – John Jefferson: 8 rec, 113 yds, 1 TD

Team – pass – rush – total – to

- SEA – 152 – 79 – 231 – 1
- SD – 330 – 90 – 420 – 4

==== Week 16: vs. Denver Broncos ====
Week Sixteen: Seattle Seahawks vs. Denver Broncos – Game summary

Quarter	1	2	3	4	Total
Broncos	10	9	6	0	25
Seahawks	0	0	3	14	17

at Kingdome, Seattle

- Date: December 21
- Game time: 1:01 pm local
- Game weather: indoors
- Game attendance: 51,853
- Referee: Bob McElwee
- TV announcers (NBC): Jay Randolph and Gene Washington
- Gamebook

Game information

First quarter

- DEN – Fred Steinfort 53-yard field goal, 8:41 (DEN 3–0)
- DEN – Riley Odoms 18-yard pass from Matt Robinson (Fred Steinfort kick), 8:14 (DEN 10–3)

Second quarter

- DEN – Matt Robinson 1-yard run (PAT failed), 4:10 (DEN 16–0)
- DEN – Fred Steinfort 55-yard field goal, 0:46 (DEN 19–0)

Third quarter

- SEA – Efrén Herrera 47-yard field goal, 9:28 (DEN 19–3)
- DEN – Fred Steinfort 34-yard field goal, 6:45 (DEN 22–3)
- DEN – Fred Steinfort 38-yard field goal, 2:16 (DEN 25–3)

Fourth quarter

- SEA – Lawrence McCutcheon 2-yard run (Efrén Herrera kick), 5:53 (DEN 25–10)
- SEA – Jim Jodat 9-yard run (Efrén Herrera kick), 0:44 (DEN 25–17)

Top passers

- DEN – Craig Morton: 9/23, 99 yds, 1 TD
- SEA – Jim Zorn: 22/33, 222 yds, 1 TD, 2 INT

Top rushers

- DEN – Rob Lytle: 11 car, 89 yds
- SEA – Jim Jodat: 10 car, 33 yds

Top receivers

- DEN – Rick Upchurch: 2 rec, 26 yds
- SEA – Steve Largent: 5 rec, 70 yds

Team – pass – rush – total – to

- DEN – 101 – 135 – 236 – 0
- SEA – 203 – 96 – 299 – 2
