= Seattle Seahawks draft history =

Draft history of the Seattle Seahawks

This page is a list of the Seattle Seahawks NFL draft selections. The first draft the Seahawks participated in was 1976, in which they made defensive tackle Steve Niehaus of Notre Dame their first-ever selection.

== Key ==
= Pro Bowler
= MVP
= Hall of Famer

== 1976 draft ==
Round	Pick #	Overall	Name	Position	College
1	2	2	Steve Niehaus	Defensive tackle	Notre Dame
2	1	29	Sammy Green	Linebacker	Florida
2	30	58	Sherman Smith	Running back	Miami (OH)
2	31	59	Steve Raible	Wide receiver	Georgia Tech
3	2	62	Jeff Lloyd	Defensive end	West Texas State
3	29	89	Rick Engles	Punter	Tulsa
3	32	92	Don Bitterlich	Kicker	Temple
4	1	93	Steve Myer	Quarterback	New Mexico
4	30	122	Randy Johnson	Guard	Georgia
4	31	123	Andrew Bolton	Running back	Fisk
5	2	126	Don Dufek	Safety	Michigan
5	29	153	Ernie Jones	Defensive back	Miami (FL)
5	32	156	Larry Bates	Running back	Miami (FL)
6	1	157	Alvis Darby	Tight end	Florida
7	2	184	Dick Dixon	Defensive tackle	Arkansas State
8	1	210	Larry Shipp	Wide receiver	LSU
9	2	239	Bob Bos	Offensive tackle	Iowa State
10	1	266	Randy Coffield	Linebacker	Florida State
11	2	293	Keith Muehr	Punter	Southwestern Louisiana
12	1	320	Ron Barnett	Wide receiver	Texas-Arlington
13	2	349	Andy Reid	Running back	Georgia
14	1	376	Jarvis Blinks	Defensive back	Northwestern State
15	2	405	Dan Smith	Offensive tackle	Washington State
16	1	432	Jeff Urczyk	Guard	Georgia Tech
17	2	461	Chris Rowland	Quarterback	Washington

== 1977 draft ==
Round	Pick #	Overall	Name	Position	College
1	14	14	Steve August	Guard	Tulsa
2	2	30	Tom Lynch	Guard	Boston College
2	13	41	Terry Beeson	Linebacker	Kansas
2	23	51	Peter Cronan	Linebacker	Boston College
3	2	58	Dennis Boyd	Defensive end	Oregon State
4	3	87	John Yarno	Center	Idaho
4	27	111	Larry Seivers	Wide receiver	Tennessee
6	3	142	Tony Benjamin	Fullback	Duke
7	2	169	David Sims	Running back	Georgia Tech
9	2	225	George Adzick	Defensive back	Minnesota
10	3	254	Sam Adkins	Quarterback	Wichita State
11	2	281	Bill Westbeld	Offensive tackle	Dayton
12	22	329	I.V. Wilson	Defensive tackle	Tulsa

== 1978 draft ==
Round	Pick #	Overall	Name	Position	College
1	9	9	Keith Simpson	Safety	Memphis State
2	8	36	Keith Butler	Linebacker	Memphis State
3	7	63	Bob Jury	Defensive back	Pittsburgh
5	9	119	Louis Bullard	Offensive tackle	Jackson State
6	8	146	Glenn Starks	Wide receiver	Texas A&I
7	7	173	John Harris	Safety	Arizona State
9	9	231	Rich Grimmett	Offensive tackle	Illinois
10	8	258	Rob Stewart	Wide receiver	Lafayette
11	23	301	George Halas	Linebacker	Miami (FL)
12	10	316	Jeff Bergeron	Running back	Lamar

== 1979 draft ==
Round	Pick #	Overall	Name	Position	College
1	18	18	Manu Tuiasosopo	Defensive tackle	UCLA
2	17	45	Joe Norman	Linebacker	Indiana
3	1	57	Michael Jackson	Linebacker	Washington
4	20	102	Mark Bell	Tight end	Colorado State
7	4	169	Larry Polowski	Linebacker	Boise State
9	20	240	Ezra Tate	Running back	Mississippi State
10	19	267	Robert Hardy	Defensive tackle	Jackson State
11	18	293	Jim Hinesly	Guard	Michigan State
12	16	319	Jeff Moore	Running back	Jackson State

== 1980 draft ==
Round	Pick #	Overall	Name	Position	College
1	10	10	Jacob Green	Defensive end	Texas A&M
2	16	44	Andre Hines	Offensive tackle	Stanford
4	14	97	Terry Dion	Defensive end	Oregon
5	17	127	Joe Steele	Running back	Washington
5	22	132	Daniel Jacobs	Defensive end	Winston-Salem State
6	15	153	Mark McNeal	Defensive end	Idaho
8	11	204	Vic Minor	Defensive back	Northeast Louisiana
8	14	207	Jack Cosgrove	Center	Pacific
9	17	238	Jim Swift	Offensive tackle	Iowa
10	16	265	Ron Essink	Offensive tackle	Grand Valley State
10	25	274	Billy Rivers	Wide receiver	Morris Brown
11	15	292	Tali Ena	Running back	Washington State
12	14	319	Presnell Gilbert	Defensive back	U.S. International

== 1981 draft ==
Round	Pick #	Overall	Name	Position	College
1	4	4	Kenny Easley	Safety	UCLA
2	3	31	David Hughes	Running back	Boise State
3	2	58	Bill Dugan	Guard	Penn State
4	4	87	Scott Phillips	Wide receiver	Brigham Young
5	3	114	Edwin Bailey	Guard	South Carolina State
6	2	140	Steve Durham	Defensive end	Clemson
7	4	170	Ron Johnson	Wide receiver	Long Beach State
7	20	186	Brad Scovill	Tight end	Penn State
8	3	196	Eric Lane	Running back	Brigham Young
9	2	223	Jim Stone	Running back	Notre Dame
9	15	236	Jim Whatley	Wide receiver	Washington State
10	4	252	Ken Dawson	Running back	Savannah State
11	3	279	Lance Olander	Running back	Colorado
12	2	306	Jeff Bednarek	Defensive tackle	Pacific

== 1982 draft ==
Round	Pick #	Overall	Name	Position	College
1	6	6	Jeff Bryant	Defensive end	Clemson
2	6	33	Bruce Scholtz	Linebacker	Texas
3	20	75	Pete Metzelaars	Tight end	Wabash
6	5	144	Jack Campbell	Offensive tackle	Utah
7	7	174	Eugene Williams	Linebacker	Tulsa
8	6	201	Chester Cooper	Wide receiver	Minnesota
9	5	228	David Jefferson	Linebacker	Miami (FL)
10	7	258	Craig Austin	Linebacker	South Dakota
11	5	284	Sam Clancy	Defensive end	Pittsburgh
12	5	311	Frank Naylor	Center	Rutgers

== 1983 draft ==
Round	Pick #	Overall	Name	Position	College
1	3	3	Curt Warner	Running back	Penn State
5	11	123	Chris Castor	Wide receiver	Duke
6	10	150	Reginald Gipson	Running back	Alabama A&M
7	9	177	Sam Merriman	Linebacker	Idaho
8	14	210	Matt Hernandez	Offensive tackle	Purdue
9	12	236	Bob Clasby	Defensive tackle	Notre Dame
10	12	263	Pete Speros	Guard	Penn State
11	11	290	Bob Mayberry	Guard	Clemson
12	10	317	Don Dow	Offensive tackle	Washington

== 1984 draft ==
Round	Pick #	Overall	Name	Position	College
1	22	22	Terry Taylor	Cornerback	Southern Illinois
2	21	49	Daryl Turner	Wide receiver	Michigan State
3	20	76	Fredd Young	Linebacker	New Mexico State
4	2	86	Rickey Hagood	Defensive tackle	South Carolina
6	22	162	John Kaiser	Linebacker	Arizona
7	21	189	Sam Slater	Offensive tackle	Weber State
8	20	216	John Puzar	Center	Long Beach State
9	19	243	Adam Schreiber	Center	Texas
10	18	270	Randall Morris	Running back	Tennessee
11	22	302	Steve Gemza	Offensive tackle	UCLA
12	21	329	Theodis Windham	Defensive back	Utah State

== 1985 draft ==
Round	Pick #	Overall	Name	Position	College
2	25	53	Owen Gill	Running back	Iowa
3	25	81	Danny Greene	Wide receiver	Washington
4	25	109	Tony Davis	Tight end	Missouri
5	11	123	Mark Napolitain	Center	Michigan State
5	15	128	Arnold Brown	Defensive back	North Carolina Central
5	25	137	Johnnie Jones	Running back	Tennessee
7	25	193	Ron Mattes	Offensive tackle	Virginia
8	25	221	Judious Lewis	Wide receiver	Arkansas State
9	24	248	Bob Otto	Defensive end	Idaho State
10	25	277	John Conner	Quarterback	Arizona
10	28	280	James Bowers	Defensive back	Memphis State
11	25	305	Louis Cooper	Linebacker	Western Carolina

== 1986 draft ==
Round	Pick #	Overall	Name	Position	College
1	15	15	John L. Williams	Fullback	Florida
3	13	68	Patrick Hunter	Cornerback	Nevada
5	16	126	Bobby Joe Edmonds	Running back	Arkansas
6	15	153	Eddie Anderson	Safety	Fort Valley State
7	15	181	Paul Miles	Running back	Nebraska
8	17	211	Alonzo Mitz	Defensive end	Florida
9	16	237	Mike Black	Offensive tackle	Sacramento State
10	15	264	Don Fairbanks	Defensive end	Colorado
11	14	291	David Norrie	Quarterback	UCLA
12	16	321	John McVeigh	Linebacker	Miami (FL)

== 1987 draft ==
Round	Pick #	Overall	Name	Position	College
1	18	18	Tony Woods	Linebacker	Pittsburgh
2	17	45	Dave Wyman	Linebacker	Stanford
4	20	104	Mark Moore	Defensive back	Oklahoma State
5	7	119	Tommie Agee	Running back	Auburn
5	19	131	Ruben Rodriguez	Punter	Arizona
7	16	184	Roland Barbay	Defensive tackle	LSU
7	17	185	Derek Tennell	Tight end	UCLA
8	21	216	Sammy Garza	Quarterback	UTEP
9	20	243	M.L. Anderson	Linebacker	Hawaii
10	19	270	Louis Clark	Wide receiver	Mississippi State
11	18	297	Darryl Oliver	Running back	Miami (FL)
12	5	312	Wes Dove	Defensive end	Syracuse
12	17	324	Tony Burse	Running back	Middle Tennessee State

== 1988 draft ==
Round	Pick #	Overall	Name	Position	College
2	22	49	Brian Blades	Wide receiver	Miami (FL)
3	20	75	Tommy Kane	Wide receiver	Syracuse
4	19	101	Kevin Harmon	Running back	Iowa
6	21	158	Roy Hart	Defensive tackle	South Carolina
7	20	185	Ray Jackson	Defensive back	Ohio State
8	22	215	Robert Tyler	Tight end	South Carolina State
9	21	242	Deatrich Wise	Defensive tackle	Jackson State
10	20	269	Derwin Jones	Defensive end	Miami (FL)
11	7	284	Rick McLeod	Offensive tackle	Washington
11	22	299	Dwayne Harper	Cornerback	South Carolina State
12	21	326	Dave DesRoches	Offensive tackle	San Diego State

== 1989 draft ==
Round	Pick #	Overall	Name	Position	College
1	15	15	Andy Heck	Offensive tackle	Notre Dame
2	16	44	Joe Tofflemire	Center	Arizona
3	15	71	Elroy Harris	Running back	Eastern Kentucky
4	17	101	Travis McNeal	Tight end	Tennessee-Chattanooga
4	19	103	James Henry	Defensive back	Southern Miss
7	17	184	Mike Nettles	Defensive back	Memphis State
8	16	211	Marlin Williams	Defensive end	Western Illinois
9	15	238	David Franks	Guard	Connecticut
10	17	268	Derrick Fenner	Running back	North Carolina
11	16	295	Mike Baum	Defensive end	Northwestern
12	15	322	R. J. Kors	Defensive back	Long Beach State

== 1990 draft ==
Round	Pick #	Overall	Name	Position	College
1	3	3	Cortez Kennedy	Defensive tackle	Miami (FL)
2	4	29	Terry Wooden	Linebacker	Syracuse
2	9	34	Robert Blackmon	Safety	Baylor
4	8	89	Chris Warren	Running back	Ferrum
5	10	119	Eric Hayes	Defensive tackle	Florida State
6	9	146	Ned Bolcar	Linebacker	Notre Dame
7	10	175	Bob Kula	Offensive tackle	Michigan State
8	9	202	Bill Hitchcock	Guard	Purdue
10	9	257	Robert Morris	Defensive end	Valdosta State
11	10	286	Daryl Reed	Defensive back	Oregon
12	8	312	John Gromos	Quarterback	Vanderbilt

== 1991 draft ==
Round	Pick #	Overall	Name	Position	College
1	16	16	Dan McGwire	Quarterback	San Diego State
2	24	51	Doug Thomas	Wide receiver	Clemson
3	19	74	David Daniels	Wide receiver	Penn State
4	15	98	John Kasay	Kicker	Georgia
5	17	128	Harlan Davis	Defensive back	Tennessee
6	16	155	Michael Sinclair	Defensive end	Eastern New Mexico
10	16	266	Erik Ringoen	Linebacker	Hofstra
11	19	297	Tony Stewart	Running back	Iowa
12	18	324	Ike Harris	Guard	South Carolina

== 1992 draft ==
Round	Pick #	Overall	Name	Position	College
1	10	10	Ray Roberts	Offensive tackle	Virginia
3	10	66	Bob Spitulski	Linebacker	Central Florida
5	10	122	Gary Dandridge	Defensive back	Appalachian State
6	10	150	Michael Bates	Wide receiver	Arizona
7	10	178	Mike Frier	Defensive tackle	Appalachian State
8	11	207	Muhammad Shamsid-Deen	Running back	Tennessee-Chattanooga
9	10	234	Larry Stayner	Tight end	Boise State
10	11	263	Anthony Hamlet	Defensive end	Miami (FL)
11	10	290	Kris Rongen	Guard	Washington
12	11	319	Chico Fraley	Linebacker	Washington
12	12	320	John MacNeill	Defensive end	Michigan State

== 1993 draft ==
Round	Pick #	Overall	Name	Position	College
1	2	2	Rick Mirer	Quarterback	Notre Dame
2	1	30	Carlton Gray	Defensive back	UCLA
4	1	85	Dean Wells	Linebacker	Kentucky
5	2	114	Terrence Warren	Wide receiver	Hampton
7	2	170	Michael McCrary	Defensive end	Wake Forest
8	1	197	Jeff Blackshear	Guard	Northeast Louisiana
8	8	204	Antonio Edwards	Defensive end	Valdosta State

== 1994 draft ==
Round	Pick #	Overall	Name	Position	College
1	8	8	Sam Adams	Defensive tackle	Texas A&M
2	7	36	Kevin Mawae	Center	LSU
3	8	73	Lamar Smith	Running back	Houston
4	7	110	Larry Whigham	Cornerback	Northeast Louisiana
7	8	202	Carlester Crumpler	Tight end	East Carolina

== 1995 draft ==
Round	Pick #	Overall	Name	Position	College
1	8	8	Joey Galloway	Wide receiver	Ohio State
2	7	39	Christian Fauria	Tight end	Colorado
4	28	126	Jason Kyle	Linebacker	Arizona State
6	9	180	Henry McMillian	Defensive tackle	Florida
6	32	203	Eddie Goines	Wide receiver	North Carolina State
7	8	216	Keif Bryant	Defensive end	Rutgers

== 1996 draft ==
Round	Pick #	Overall	Name	Position	College
1	21	21	Pete Kendall	Guard	Boston College
2	17	47	Fred Thomas	Cornerback	Tennessee-Martin
3	16	77	Robert Barr	Offensive tackle	Rutgers
3	30	91	Reggie Brown	Fullback	Fresno State
4	4	99	Phillip Daniels	Defensive end	Georgia
4	36	131	Eric Unverzagt	Linebacker	Wisconsin
6	17	184	Reggie Green	Guard	Florida
6	42	209	T. J. Cunningham	Safety	Colorado
7	16	225	Johnie Church	Defensive end	Florida

== 1997 draft ==
Round	Pick #	Overall	Name	Position	College
1	3	3	Shawn Springs	Cornerback	Ohio State
1	6	6	Walter Jones	Offensive tackle	Florida State
5	12	142	Eric Stokes	Defensive back	Nebraska
6	11	174	Itula Mili	Tight end	Brigham Young
7	10	210	Carlos Jones	Defensive back	Miami (FL)

== 1998 draft ==
Round	Pick #	Overall	Name	Position	College
1	15	15	Anthony Simmons	Linebacker	Clemson
2	17	47	Todd Weiner	Offensive tackle	Kansas State
3	15	76	Ahman Green	Running back	Nebraska
4	16	108	DeShone Myles	Linebacker	Nevada
6	9	162	Carl Hansen	Defensive tackle	Stanford
6	16	169	Bobby Shaw	Wide receiver	California
7	8	197	Jason McEndoo	Offensive tackle	Washington State

== 1999 draft ==
Round	Pick #	Overall	Name	Position	College
1	22	22	Lamar King	Defensive end	Saginaw Valley State
3	16	77	Brock Huard	Quarterback	Washington
3	21	82	Karsten Bailey	Wide receiver	Auburn
4	20	115	Antonio Cochran	Defensive end	Georgia
5	7	140	Floyd Wedderburn	Offensive tackle	Penn State
5	19	152	Charlie Rogers	Running back	Georgia Tech
6	1	170	Steve Johnson	Cornerback	Tennessee

== 2000 draft ==
Round	Pick #	Overall	Name	Position	College
1	19	19	Shaun Alexander	Running back	Alabama
1	22	22	Chris McIntosh	Offensive tackle	Wisconsin
2	21	52	Ike Charlton	Linebacker	Virginia Tech
3	18	80	Darrell Jackson	Wide receiver	Florida
4	22	116	Marcus Bell	Defensive tackle	Arizona
4	25	119	Isaiah Kacyvenski	Linebacker	Harvard
6	9	175	James Williams	Wide receiver	Marshall
6	19	185	Tim Watson	Defensive tackle	Rowan
6	24	190	John Hilliard	Defensive tackle	Mississippi State

== 2001 draft ==
Round	Pick #	Overall	Name	Position	College
1	9	9	Koren Robinson	Wide receiver	North Carolina State
1	17	17	Steve Hutchinson	Guard	Michigan
2	9	40	Ken Lucas	Cornerback	Ole Miss
3	20	82	Heath Evans	Fullback	Auburn
4	9	104	Orlando Huff	Linebacker	Fresno State
4	32	127	Curtis Fuller	Safety	TCU
4	33	128	Floyd Womack	Offensive tackle	Mississippi State
5	9	140	Alex Bannister	Wide receiver	Eastern Kentucky
6	9	172	Josh Booty	Quarterback	LSU
7	10	210	Harold Blackmon	Safety	Northwestern
7	22	222	Dennis Norman	Center	Princeton
7	37	237	Kris Kocurek	Defensive tackle	Texas Tech

== 2002 draft ==
Round	Pick #	Overall	Name	Position	College
1	28	28	Jerramy Stevens	Tight end	Washington
2	22	54	Maurice Morris	Running back	Oregon
2	28	60	Anton Palepoi	Defensive end	UNLV
3	20	85	Kris Richard	Cornerback	USC
4	22	120	Terreal Bierria	Safety	Georgia
5	11	146	Rocky Bernard	Defensive tackle	Texas A&M
5	34	169	Ryan Hannam	Tight end	Northern Iowa
5	36	171	Matt Hill	Offensive tackle	Boise State
6	22	194	Craig Jarrett	Punter	Michigan State
7	21	232	Jeff Kelly	Quarterback	Southern Miss

== 2003 draft ==
Round	Pick #	Overall	Name	Position	College
1	11	11	Marcus Trufant	Cornerback	Washington State
2	10	42	Ken Hamlin	Safety	Arkansas
3	9	73	Wayne Hunter	Offensive tackle	Hawaii
4	13	110	Seneca Wallace	Quarterback	Iowa State
4	38	135	Solomon Bates	Linebacker	Arizona State
5	30	165	Chris Davis	Fullback	Syracuse
6	10	183	Rashad Moore	Defensive tackle	Tennessee
7	8	222	Josh Brown	Placekicker	Nebraska
7	10	224	Taco Wallace	Wide receiver	Kansas State

== 2004 draft ==
Round	Pick #	Overall	Name	Position	College
1	23	23	Marcus Tubbs	Defensive tackle	Texas
2	21	53	Michael Boulware	Safety	Florida State
3	21	84	Sean Locklear	Offensive tackle	North Carolina State
4	20	116	Niko Koutouvides	Linebacker	Purdue
5	25	157	D. J. Hackett	Wide receiver	Colorado
6	24	189	Craig Terrill	Defensive tackle	Purdue
7	23	224	Donnie Jones	Punter	LSU

== 2005 draft ==
Round	Pick #	Overall	Name	Position	College
1	26	26	Chris Spencer	Center	Ole Miss
2	13	45	Lofa Tatupu	Linebacker	USC
3	21	85	David Greene	Quarterback	Georgia
3	34	98	Leroy Hill	Linebacker	Clemson
4	4	105	Ray Willis	Offensive tackle	Florida State
5	23	159	Jeb Huckeba	Defensive end	Arkansas
6	22	196	Tony Jackson	Tight end	Iowa
7	21	235	Cornelius Wortham	Linebacker	Alabama
7	40	256	Doug Nienhuis	Offensive tackle	Oregon State

== 2006 draft ==
Round	Pick #	Overall	Name	Position	College
1	31	31	Kelly Jennings	Cornerback	Miami (FL)
2	31	63	Darryl Tapp	Defensive end	Virginia Tech
4	31	128	Rob Sims	Guard	Ohio State
5	31	163	David Kirtman	Fullback	USC
7	31	239	Ryan Plackemeier	Punter	Wake Forest
7	41	249	Ben Obomanu	Wide receiver	Auburn

== 2007 draft ==
Round	Pick #	Overall	Name	Position	College
2	23	55	Josh Wilson	Cornerback	Maryland
3	22	85	Brandon Mebane	Defensive tackle	California
4	21	120	Baraka Atkins	Defensive end	Miami (FL)
4	25	124	Mansfield Wrotto	Guard	Georgia Tech
5	24	161	Will Herring	Linebacker	Auburn
6	23	197	Courtney Taylor	Wide receiver	Auburn
6	36	210	Jordan Kent	Wide receiver	Oregon
7	22	232	Steve Vallos	Guard	Wake Forest

== 2008 draft ==
Round	Pick #	Overall	Name	Position	College
1	28	28	Lawrence Jackson	Defensive end	USC
2	7	38	John Carlson	Tight end	Notre Dame
4	22	121	Red Bryant	Defensive tackle	Texas A&M
5	28	163	Owen Schmitt	Fullback	West Virginia
6	23	189	Tyler Schmitt	Long snapper	San Diego State
7	26	233	Justin Forsett	Running back	California
7	28	235	Brandon Coutu	Placekicker	Georgia

== 2009 draft ==
Round	Pick #	Overall	Name	Position	College
1	4	4	Aaron Curry	Linebacker	Wake Forest
2	17	49	Max Unger	Center	Oregon
3	27	91	Deon Butler	Wide receiver	Penn State
6	5	178	Mike Teel	Quarterback	Rutgers
7	36	245	Courtney Greene	Safety	Rutgers
7	38	247	Nick Reed	Defensive end	Oregon
7	39	248	Cameron Morrah	Tight end	California

== 2010 draft ==
Round	Pick #	Overall	Name	Position	College
1	6	6	Russell Okung	Offensive tackle	Oklahoma State
1	14	14	Earl Thomas	Safety	Texas
2	28	60	Golden Tate	Wide receiver	Notre Dame
4	13	111	Walter Thurmond III	Cornerback	Oregon
4	29	127	E. J. Wilson	Defensive end	North Carolina
5	2	133	Kam Chancellor	Safety	Virginia Tech
6	16	185	Anthony McCoy	Tight end	USC
7	29	236	Dexter Davis	Defensive end	Arizona State
7	38	245	Jameson Konz	Wide receiver	Kent State

== 2011 draft ==
Round	Pick #	Overall	Name	Position	College
1	25	25	James Carpenter	Offensive tackle	Alabama
3	11	75	John Moffitt	Guard	Wisconsin
4	2	99	K. J. Wright	Linebacker	Mississippi State
4	10	107	Kris Durham	Wide receiver	Georgia
5	23	154	Richard Sherman	Cornerback	Stanford
5	25	156	Mark LeGree	Safety	Appalachian State
6	8	173	Byron Maxwell	Cornerback	Clemson
7	2	205	Lazarius Levingston	Defensive end	Louisiana State
7	39	242	Malcolm Smith	Linebacker	USC

== 2012 draft ==
Round	Pick #	Overall	Name	Position	College
1	15	15	Bruce Irvin	Defensive end	West Virginia
2	15	47	Bobby Wagner	Linebacker	Utah State
3	12	75	Russell Wilson	Quarterback	Wisconsin
4	11	106	Robert Turbin	Running back	Utah State
4	19	114	Jaye Howard	Defensive tackle	Florida
5	19	154	Korey Toomer	Linebacker	Idaho
6	2	172	Jeremy Lane	Cornerback	Northwestern St. (LA)
6	11	181	Winston Guy	Safety	Kentucky
7	18	225	J.R. Sweezy	Defensive end	North Carolina State
7	25	232	Greg Scruggs	Defensive end	Louisville

== 2013 draft ==
Round	Pick #	Overall	Name	Position	College
2	30	62	Christine Michael	Running back	Texas A&M
3	25	87	Jordan Hill	Defensive tackle	Penn State
4	26	123	Chris Harper	Wide receiver	Kansas State
5	4	137	Jesse Williams	Defensive tackle	Alabama
5	5	138	Tharold Simon	Cornerback	Louisiana State
5	25	158	Luke Willson	Tight end	Rice
6	26	194	Spencer Ware	Running back	Louisiana State
7	14	220	Ryan Seymour	Guard	Vanderbilt
7	25	231	Ty Powell	Defensive end	Harding
7	35	241	Jared Smith	Defensive tackle	New Hampshire
7	36	242	Michael Bowie	Offensive tackle	Northeastern State (OK)

== 2014 draft ==
Round	Pick #	Overall	Name	Position	College
2	13	45	Paul Richardson	Wide receiver	Colorado
2	32	64	Justin Britt	Offensive tackle	Missouri
4	8	108	Cassius Marsh	Defensive end	UCLA
4	23	123	Kevin Norwood	Wide receiver	Alabama
4	32	132	Kevin Pierre-Louis	Linebacker	Boston College
5	32	172	Jimmy Staten	Defensive tackle	Middle Tennessee State
6	23	199	Garrett Scott	Offensive tackle	Marshall
6	32	208	Eric Pinkins	Safety	San Diego State
7	12	227	Kiero Small	Running back	Arkansas

== 2015 draft ==
Round	Pick #	Overall	Name	Position	College
2	31	63	Frank Clark	Defensive end	Michigan
3	5	69	Tyler Lockett	Wide receiver	Kansas State
4	31	130	Terry Poole	Guard	San Diego State
4	35	134	Mark Glowinski	Guard	West Virginia
5	34	170	Tye Smith	Cornerback	Towson
6	33	209	Obum Gwacham	Defensive end	Oregon State
6	38	214	Kristjan Sokoli	Defensive tackle	Buffalo
7	31	248	Ryan Murphy	Defensive back	Oregon State

== 2016 draft ==
Round	Pick #	Overall	Name	Position	College
1	31	31	Germain Ifedi	Offensive tackle	Texas A&M
2	18	49	Jarran Reed	Defensive tackle	Alabama
3	27	90	C. J. Prosise	Running back	Notre Dame
3	32	94	Nick Vannett	Tight end	Ohio State
3	35	97	Rees Odhiambo	Guard	Boise State
5	8	147	Quinton Jefferson	Defensive tackle	Maryland
5	34	171	Alex Collins	Running back	Arkansas
6	40	215	Joey Hunt	Center	TCU
7	22	243	Kenny Lawler	Wide receiver	California
7	26	247	Zac Brooks	Running back	Clemson

== 2017 draft ==
Round	Pick #	Overall	Name	Position	College
2	3	35	Malik McDowell	Defensive tackle	Michigan State
2	26	59	Ethan Pocic	Center	LSU
3	26	90	Shaquill Griffin	Cornerback	Central Florida
3	31	95	Lano Hill	Safety	Michigan
3	38	102	Nazair Jones	Defensive tackle	North Carolina
3	42	106	Amara Darboh	Wide receiver	Michigan
4	4	111	Tedric Thompson	Safety	Colorado
6	3	187	Michael Tyson	Safety	Cincinnati
6	26	210	Justin Senior	Offensive tackle	Mississippi State
7	8	226	David Moore	Wide receiver	East Central
7	31	249	Chris Carson	Running back	Oklahoma State

== 2018 draft ==
Round	Pick #	Overall	Name	Position	College
1	27	27	Rashaad Penny	Running back	San Diego State
3	15	79	Rasheem Green	Defensive end	Southern California
4	20	120	Will Dissly	Tight end	Washington
5	4	141	Shaquem Griffin	Linebacker	Central Florida
5	9	146	Tre Flowers	Safety	Oklahoma State
5	12	149	Michael Dickson	Punter	Texas
5	31	168	Jamarco Jones	Offensive tackle	Ohio State
6	12	186	Jacob Martin	Linebacker	Temple
7	2	220	Alex McGough	Quarterback	Florida International

== 2019 draft ==
Round	Pick #	Overall	Name	Position	College
1	29	29	L. J. Collier	Defensive end	TCU
2	15	47	Marquise Blair	Safety	Utah
2	32	64	DK Metcalf	Wide receiver	Ole Miss
3	25	88	Cody Barton	Linebacker	Utah
4	18	120	Gary Jennings Jr.	Wide receiver	West Virginia
4	22	124	Phil Haynes	Guard	Wake Forest
4	30	132	Ugo Amadi	Safety	Oregon
5	4	142	Ben Burr-Kirven	Linebacker	Washington
6	32	204	Travis Homer	Running back	Miami (FL)
6	37	209	Demarcus Christmas	Defensive tackle	Florida State
7	22	236	John Ursua	Wide receiver	Hawaii

== 2020 draft ==
Round	Pick #	Overall	Name	Position	College
1	27	27	Jordyn Brooks	Linebacker	Texas Tech
2	16	48	Darrell Taylor	Defensive end	Tennessee
3	5	69	Damien Lewis	Guard	LSU
4	27	133	Colby Parkinson	Tight end	Stanford
4	38	144	DeeJay Dallas	Running back	Miami (FL)
5	2	148	Alton Robinson	Defensive end	Syracuse
6	35	214	Freddie Swain	Wide receiver	Florida
7	37	251	Stephen Sullivan	Tight end	LSU

== 2021 draft ==
Round	Pick #	Overall	Name	Position	College
2	24	56	D'Wayne Eskridge	Wide receiver	Western Michigan
4	32	137	Tre Brown	Cornerback	Oklahoma
6	24	208	Stone Forsythe	Offensive tackle	Florida

== 2022 draft ==
Round	Pick #	Overall	Name	Position	College
1	9	9	Charles Cross	Offensive tackle	Mississippi State
2	8	40	Boye Mafe	Defensive end	Minnesota
2	9	41	Kenneth Walker III	Running back	Michigan State
3	8	72	Abraham Lucas	Offensive tackle	Washington State
4	4	109	Coby Bryant	Cornerback	Cincinnati
5	10	153	Tariq Woolen	Cornerback	UTSA
5	15	158	Tyreke Smith	Defensive end	Ohio State
7	8	229	Bo Melton	Wide receiver	Rutgers
7	12	233	Dareke Young	Wide receiver	Lenoir–Rhyne

== 2023 draft ==
Round	Pick #	Overall	Name	Position	College
1	5	5	Devon Witherspoon	Cornerback	Illinois
1	20	20	Jaxon Smith-Njigba	Wide receiver	Ohio State
2	6	37	Derick Hall	Defensive end	Auburn
2	21	52	Zach Charbonnet	Running back	UCLA
4	6	108	Anthony Bradford	Guard	LSU
4	21	123	Cameron Young	Defensive tackle	Mississippi State
5	16	151	Mike Morris	Defensive end	Michigan
5	19	154	Olusegun Oluwatimi	Center	Michigan
6	21	198	Jerrick Reed II	Safety	New Mexico
7	20	237	Kenny McIntosh	Running back	Georgia

== 2024 draft ==
Round	Pick #	Overall	Name	Position	College
1	16	16	Byron Murphy II	Defensive tackle	Texas
3	17	81	Christian Haynes	Guard	UConn
4	18	118	Tyrice Knight	Linebacker	UTEP
4	21	121	AJ Barner	Tight end	Michigan
5	1	136	Nehemiah Pritchett	Cornerback	Auburn
6	3	179	Sataoa Laumea	Guard	Utah
6	16	192	D. J. James	Cornerback	Auburn
6	31	207	Michael Jerrell	Offensive tackle	Findlay

== 2025 draft ==
Round	Pick #	Overall	Name	Position	College
1	18	18	Grey Zabel	Guard	North Dakota State
2	3	35	Nick Emmanwori	Safety	South Carolina
2	18	50	Elijah Arroyo	Tight end	Miami (FL)
3	28	92	Jalen Milroe	Quarterback	Alabama
5	4	142	Rylie Mills	Defensive end	Notre Dame
5	30	166	Tory Horton	Wide receiver	Colorado State
5	39	175	Robbie Ouzts	Fullback	Alabama
6	16	192	Bryce Cabeldue	Offensive tackle	Kansas
7	7	223	Damien Martinez	Running back	Miami (FL)
7	18	234	Mason Richman	Offensive tackle	Iowa
7	22	238	Ricky White III	Wide receiver	UNLV

== 2026 draft ==
Round	Pick #	Overall	Name	Position	College
1	32	32	Jadarian Price	Running back	Notre Dame
2	32	64	Bud Clark	Safety	TCU
3	35	99	Julian Neal	Cornerback	Arkansas
5	8	148	Beau Stephens	Guard	Iowa
6	18	199	Emmanuel Henderson	Wide receiver	Kansas
7	20	236	Andre Fuller	Cornerback	Toledo
7	26	242	Deven Eastern	Defensive tackle	Minnesota
7	38	255	Michael Dansby	Cornerback	Arizona

== See also ==
- History of the Seattle Seahawks
- List of professional American football drafts
