= Hosea Fortune =

American football player (born 1959)

No. 84
- Position: Wide receiver

Personal information
- Born: March 4, 1959 (age 67); New Orleans, Louisiana, U.S.
- Listed height: 6 ft 0 in (1.83 m)
- Listed weight: 174 lb (79 kg)

Career information
- High school: Beverly Hills (CA)
- College: Rice
- NFL draft: 1982: undrafted

Career history
- Houston Oilers (1982)*; Montreal Concordes (1982); San Diego Chargers (1983); Edmonton Eskimos (1985)*
- * Offseason or practice squad member only
- Stats at Pro Football Reference

Hosea Gerard Fortune (born March 4, 1959) is an American former professional football player who was a wide receiver for the San Diego Chargers of the National Football League (NFL) in 1983. He played college football for the Rice Owls.

== High School and College career ==
In January 1977 he received the honor of Beverly Hills High School Player of the Year for the season 1975-1976 and the Citizens Savings Athletic Foundation Trophy. In 1977 he also received All-CIF 3-A First Team Offense honors. Fortune played four years for the Rice Owls where he lettered three times. In 1981 he got All-SWC Second Team Offense honors.

== Professional career ==
In May 1982 he signed as an undrafted free agent with the Houston Oilers. In August 1982 he got signed by the Montreal Concordes of the Canadian Football League on a 14-day trial contract. In August 1983 he got released by the San Diego Chargers together with Louie Kelcher, Wilbur Young, Don Goode, Gurnest Brown, Russ Washington, Jim Jodat, Jeff Moore, Darryl Bowles, Steve Krainock and Darrell Pattillo. Before he signed with the Chargers he worked as a male model.

He got released in June 1985 by the Edmonton Eskimos together with six other players.
