= Dave Williams (wide receiver) =

American football player (1945–2024)

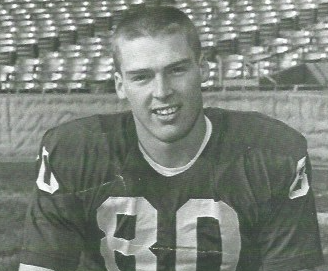
- Williams with Cardinals, 1968

No. 80, 84, 82
- Position: Wide receiver

Personal information
- Born: August 10, 1945; Cedar Rapids, Iowa, U.S.
- Died: June 19, 2024 (aged 78); Amelia Island, Florida, U.S.
- Listed height: 6 ft 2 in (1.88 m)
- Listed weight: 207 lb (94 kg)

Career information
- High school: Lincoln (Tacoma, Washington)
- College: Washington
- NFL draft: 1967: 1st round, 16th overall pick

Career history
- St. Louis Cardinals (1967–1971); San Diego Chargers (1972–1973); Pittsburgh Steelers (1973); Southern California Sun (1974-1975); Seattle Seahawks (1976)*
- * Offseason or practice squad member only

Awards and highlights
- Second-team All-American (1965); First-team All-PCC (1965); Second-team All-Pac-8 (1966)

Career NFL statistics
- Receptions: 183
- Receiving yards: 2,768
- Touchdowns: 25
- Stats at Pro Football Reference

David Laverne Williams (August 10, 1945 – June 19, 2024) was an American professional football player who was a wide receiver for 10 years in the National Football League (NFL) and the World Football League (WFL). He was the first player signed by the Seattle Seahawks in 1975.

Williams was an All-American for the Washington Huskies in football and track, as a decathlete. He was inducted into the Husky Hall of Fame in 2014.

Following his pro football career, Williams was an executive working in property management for more than four decades. He helped to establish a church on Kauai in 2001, which met in a tent until the North Shore Christian Church building was completed in 2014.

== Early life and education ==
Born in Cedar Rapids, Iowa, Williams was the fourth of seven children of Joseph Laverne Williams and Cleo Maye (née Hill) Williams. His family moved in the winter of 1951–1952 to Tacoma, Washington, where they lived near his paternal grandparents.

Williams traced his interest in football to 1955, when his family acquired a television and began to watch NFL football on Sundays. His older brothers Joe and Jerry played football, and they introduced him to playing the game in their front yard. Williams recounted how Jerry played catch with him and taught him ball drills: "We would be ten yards away from each other and begin by throwing the ball to each other from many angles and positions. He would find my weakest positions and work on those even more." At the end of the drill, they did ten pushups for every dropped ball.

In Tacoma, Williams attended the former Hawthorne Elementary School, Gault Junior High School, and Lincoln High School, where he graduated in 1963. He earned a total of twelve high school varsity letters: three in football, three in basketball, three in decathlon, and three in track and field. He also played on the 1962 Connie Mack Cheney Studs baseball team.

== Collegiate sports career: football and track ==
Williams earned six varsity letters at the University of Washington: three in football, where he played tight end, and three in track, in an era when freshmen were not eligible for varsity teams. Coaches of the PAC-8 named Williams to the 1965 All-Pacific Athletic Conference team.

As a freshman, in his first decathlon in 1965 he qualified for the National AAU Decathlon Championships, and placed 14th among 30 competitors in the Olympic tryouts.

Williams received his baccalaureate degree in 1973 at the University of Washington. He was named to the Washington's Husky Hall of Fame 2014 class.

== Professional football career ==
Williams was a professional football player for ten seasons, eight as a wide receiver in the NFL, and two seasons as a wide receiver in the World Football League. During his pro career, he caught 183 passes for 2,768 yards and 25 touchdowns in the NFL.

He was also the first player signed by the Seattle Seahawks, and worked for the team as a spokesman during their start-up year, but never played for the Seahawks due to a knee injury.

=== St. Louis Cardinals, 1967–1971 ===
Williams was the first draft pick of the Cardinals, the sixteenth overall pick in the first round in 1967 NFL draft. He was a wide receiver for five seasons for St. Louis, starting in 53 of 67 games in which he played, catching 162 passes, and receiving for a total of 22 touchdowns. He was in tenth place on the 1968 NFL leaderboard for 56.8 receiving yards per game. In 1969, he made fifth place on the NFL leaderboard, with 56 receptions.

=== San Diego Chargers, 1972–1973 ===
In 1972 Williams was traded to the Chargers, where he met and formed a friendship with Johnny Unitas. He played in 12 games, starting in 6.

=== Pittsburgh Steelers, 1973 ===
The Steelers claimed Williams on waivers from the Chargers in 1973. He played in one regular season game, and in a playoff game. The Steelers released him from his contract in the spring of 1974.

=== Southern California Sun, 1974–1975 ===
Williams reported to the Southern California Sun training camp on June 5, 1973. He played his last pro football in the World Football League, with two seasons at the Southern California Sun, and he scored a total of twenty touchdowns. Williams was credited with holding the players together throughout the winter of 1975 when they had not received paychecks since the previous September. Club president Larry Hatfield said, "But we would have lost a lot more [players] without the job Dave did. His role in keeping the team together was extremely substantial He took the time to understand our problems in depth and convey them to the players."

=== Seattle Seahawks, 1976 ===
Williams was the first to sign with the Seahawks in the fall of 1975, and he worked as spokesman and assistant to the general manager. He gave over 90 presentations promoting the Seahawks to organizations throughout the Pacific Northwest. He injured his left knee in a promotional event prior to the start of their first season in 1976, and retired from professional football in the fall of 1976.

== NFL career statistics ==
Legend
**Bold**	Career high

=== Regular season ===
Year	Team	Games		Receiving				
Year	Team	GP	GS	Rec	Yds	Avg	Lng	TD
1967	STL	14	5	28	405	14.5	49	5
1968	STL	12	12	43	682	15.9	**71**	6
1969	STL	14	14	**56**	**702**	12.5	61	**7**
1970	STL	14	13	23	364	15.8	58	3
1971	STL	13	9	12	182	15.2	37	1
1972	SDG	12	6	14	315	**22.5**	62	3
1973	SDG	6	5	7	118	16.9	30	0
1973	PIT	1	0	0	0	0.0	0	0
Career		86	64	183	2,768	15.1	71	25

=== Playoffs ===
Year	Team	Games		Receiving				
Year	Team	GP	GS	Rec	Yds	Avg	Lng	TD
1973	PIT	1	0	1	14	14.0	14	0
Career		1	0	1	14	14.0	14	0

== Later life and career ==
In the mid-1980s, Gene Upshaw contacted Williams to head the steering committee for the new NFL Retired Players Association (RPA), and he chaired the association from 1984 through 1988. The purpose of the RPA was to provide "powerful national advocacy and collegial support for retired professional football players, their families and the community at large". As spokesman for the RPA, Williams pointed out that half of the 120 retired players in the Pro Football Hall of Fame in Canton, Ohio, had no pension. Subsequently, the NFL Players Association asked Commissioner Pete Rozelle and the League to "give pensions to the players who pioneered the game."

After leaving professional football, Williams had a career of more than forty years in property management, a business he began while playing for the Chargers. Williams was an executive for multi-unit property management companies, including Equity Residential and Apartment Investment and Management Company, among others. He and his wife Sherry incorporated "David L. Williams Management Consultants, LLC" in 1999.

=== Faith and memoir publication ===
Williams and his wife helped found an evangelical Christian church on Kaua'i in 2001. They served as Deacons and Church treasurers and worshipped in a tent for years. North Shore Christian Church was built thirteen years later and opened in January 2014. In 2017, Williams published his life story, combined with stories he had transcribed from tapes of his father's memories, entitled My Best for Him, My Memoir.

== Athletic records, honors and awards ==
Williams' high school football kudos included all-city, all-conference, and all-state honors in both junior and senior years; the State of Washington's 1963 AA 120 hurdles champion; High School football All American in senior year; team captain senior year; and he was ultimately named to The Seattle Times High School Football Team of the Century in 1999.

He won national collegiate honors both in football and in track and field events. In his junior year, Williams was named to the Associated Press All-America football second-team for 1965. The Associated Press also honored him in 1966 with All-America honorable mention in football, and he won fourth place at the NCAA in the 440-yard hurdles, as well as sixth place in the 120-yard hurdles. He was on the 4×110-yard relay team at the 1967 NCAAs that won fifth place. Williams completed his university career in 1967, making second-team All-America (Associated Press), first-team All-Pacific Coast and he was invited to the 1966 East–West Shrine Game, 1967 Hula Bowl, and 1967 Chicago College All-Star Game. Williams was also a four-time All-American in track and field. Between 1964–1967, he earned six collegiate varsity letters.

The Husky Hall of Fame lists Williams' records that have stood for more than half a century: "[He] still holds the UW records for receiving yards in a game with 257 vs. UCLA in 1965; for receptions by a tight end in a game with 10 (twice in 1965, vs. both UCLA and Stanford); receiving TDs in a season by a tight end (10, 1965); and for career receiving yards per catch by a tight end (18.3)".

== Death ==
Williams died after a prolonged illness in Amelia Island, Florida, on June 19, 2024. He was 78.

== See also ==
- Washington Huskies football statistical leaders
