= Lawrence McCutcheon =

American football player and executive (1950–2026)

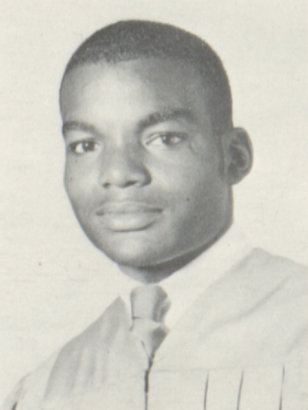
- McCutcheon c. 1968

No. 31, 30, 33
- Position: Running back

Personal information
- Born: June 2, 1950; Plainview, Texas, U.S.
- Died: October 23, 2026 (aged 76)
- Listed height: 6 ft 1 in (1.85 m)
- Listed weight: 205 lb (93 kg)

Career information
- High school: Plainview
- College: Colorado State
- NFL draft: 1972: 3rd round, 70th overall pick

Career history
- Los Angeles Rams (1972–1979); Denver Broncos (1980); Seattle Seahawks (1980); Buffalo Bills (1981)

Awards and highlights
- Second-team All-Pro (1974); 5× Pro Bowl (1973–1977)

Career NFL statistics
- Rushing attempts: 1,521
- Rushing yards: 6,578
- Rushing touchdowns: 26
- Stats at Pro Football Reference

Lawrence McCutcheon (June 2, 1950 – October 23, 2026) was an American professional football player who was a running back in the National Football League (NFL) for the Los Angeles Rams from 1972 to 1980, the Denver Broncos and Seattle Seahawks in 1980, and 1981 with the Buffalo Bills, reuniting with former Rams head coach Chuck Knox. He played college football for the Colorado State Rams.

== Early life ==
Born and raised in Plainview, Texas, McCutcheon graduated from Plainview High School in 1968 and played college football at Colorado State University in Fort Collins, then a member of the Western Athletic Conference (WAC).

== Professional career ==
McCutcheon was selected in the third round of the 1972 NFL draft by the Rams, the 70th overall pick. He appeared in 89 games for the Rams, appearing in seven playoff games including Super Bowl XIV. In the 1975 playoffs, McCutcheon established a postseason record by rushing for 202 yards on 37 carries in a win over the St. Louis Cardinals.

Under head coach Knox, McCutcheon led the Rams in rushing for five consecutive seasons, from 1973 through 1977, and was named to the Pro Bowl each year. During his tenure with the Rams, McCutcheon gained a total of 6,186 yards on 1,425 carries. In addition to his five consecutive Pro Bowl appearances, McCutcheon was named Second-team All-Pro in 1974, All-NFC in 1977 and Second-team All-NFC in 1973, 1975 and 1976.

In Super Bowl XIV, McCutcheon threw a 24-yard touchdown pass to Ron Smith, giving the Rams a 19–17 lead over the Pittsburgh Steelers. However, the Rams went on to lose the game, 31–19.

== Personal life and death ==
In 1977, McCutcheon was then rumoured to be in a relationship with the Supremes member Scherrie Payne. McCutcheon was promoted to director of player personnel of the Rams in May 2003, a role he held until 2016. His son Daylon McCutcheon played cornerback for the Cleveland Browns.

McCutcheon died on October 23, 2026, at the age of 76, following a battle with Parkinson's disease.

== NFL career statistics ==
Legend
**Bold**	Career high

=== Regular season ===
Year	Team	Games		Rushing						Receiving					Fumbles	
Year	Team	GP	GS	Att	Yds	Avg	Y/G	Lng	TD	Rec	Yds	Avg	Lng	TD	Fum	FR
1972	LARams	3	0	Did not record any stats												
1973	LARams	12	12	210	1,097	**5.2**	**91.4**	37	2	30	289	9.6	31	**3**	4	0
1974	LARams	14	14	236	1,109	4.7	79.2	23	3	**39**	**408**	10.5	**50**	2	7	2
1975	LARams	13	13	213	911	4.3	70.1	43	2	31	230	7.4	24	1	4	1
1976	LARams	14	14	291	1,168	4.0	83.4	40	**9**	28	305	10.9	42	2	**10**	2
1977	LARams	14	14	**294**	**1,238**	4.2	88.4	**48**	7	25	274	**11.0**	30	2	6	2
1978	LARams	8	7	118	420	3.6	52.5	18	0	12	76	6.3	33	2	4	**3**
1979	LARams	11	4	73	243	3.3	22.1	21	0	19	101	5.3	11	0	1	0
1980	DEN	6	0	12	52	4.3	8.7	12	0	1	12	12.0	12	0	1	0
1980	SEA	8	1	40	202	5.1	25.3	32	3	8	64	8.0	17	1	3	2
1981	BUF	6	3	34	138	4.1	23.0	12	0	5	40	8.0	17	0	1	0
Career		109	82	1,521	6,578	4.3	60.3	48	26	198	1,799	9.1	50	13	41	12
