= Ron Essink =

American football player (born 1958)

No. 64
- Position: Offensive tackle

Personal information
- Born: July 30, 1958 (age 68); Zeeland, Michigan, U.S.
- Listed height: 6 ft 6 in (1.98 m)
- Listed weight: 260 lb (118 kg)

Career information
- High school: Zeeland
- College: Grand Valley State
- NFL draft: 1980: 10th round, 265th overall pick

Career history
- Seattle Seahawks (1980–1986); Dallas Cowboys (1987)*
- * Offseason or practice squad member only

Awards and highlights
- Football All-American (1979); 2× All-GLIAC (1978, 1979); 2× All-NAIA District 23 (1978, 1979); 2x Wrestling All-American (1978, 1980)

Career NFL statistics
- Games played: 83
- Games started: 70
- Fumble recoveries: 2
- Stats at Pro Football Reference

Medal record

Collegiate Wrestling

Representing the Grand Valley State Lakers

NCAA Division II Championships
Gold medal – first place	1980 Omaha	Heavyweight

NAIA Championships
Gold medal – first place	1980 Hays	Heavyweight
Silver medal – second place	1978 Whitewater	Heavyweight

Ronald Arden Essink (born July 30, 1958) is an American former professional football player who was an offensive tackle for the Seattle Seahawks of the National Football League (NFL). He played college football for the Grand Valley State Lakers.

== Early life ==
Essink attended Zeeland High School, where he played as a tight end. He began practicing wrestling as a senior, going undefeated and winning the heavyweight Class B title, which was the school's first state title in any sport.

He accepted a football scholarship from Grand Valley State University, after the wrestling coach Jim Scott, convinced head coach Jim Harkema to make the offer. As a sophomore, he was converted into an offensive tackle because of an injury to a starter. He would become an NCAA Division II and NAIA All-American.

As a junior, he helped the team achieve the best record (9–3) in school history and qualify to the playoffs for the first time. They lost against Elon College in the semifinals of the NAIA playoffs.

He also practiced wrestling, compiling a 91-10 (.901) record. He won national titles in the NCAA Division II and NAIA championships. He received All-American recognition after placing seventh at the NCAA Division I championships.

In 1991, he was inducted into the Grand Valley State University Athletics Hall of Fame.

== Professional career ==
=== Seattle Seahawks ===
Essink was selected by the Seattle Seahawks in the 10th round (265th overall) of the 1980 NFL draft. He became the first Grand Valley player to be drafted by an NFL team. As a rookie, he started 3 games at left tackle, when he passed Louis Bullard on the depth chart. On November 27, he scored a touchdown on a two-yard pass from Jim Zorn, for the only Seahawks' points in a 7–51 loss against the Dallas Cowboys.

He was the regular starter at left tackle for the following 5 seasons, until injuries started to limit him. In 1986, rookie Ron Mattes was named the starter at left tackle and Essink ended up missing the entire season because of elbow injuries.

In 1987, he was sidelined with a pulled groin muscle he suffered in the second day of training camp. On August 25, he was traded to the Dallas Cowboys in exchange for a fifth round draft choice (#120-Chris Gaines).

=== Dallas Cowboys ===
In 1987, the Dallas Cowboys acquired him to be the starting left tackle. On September 1, he announced his retirement from professional football, one week after being traded. He had undergone 6 surgeries on both elbows in the previous two years.

== Personal life ==
After football, he returned to Zeeland High School, to become a teacher and a wrestling coach. He also worked for the Zeeland Street Department.
