= Sam Adkins (American football) =

American football player (born 1955)

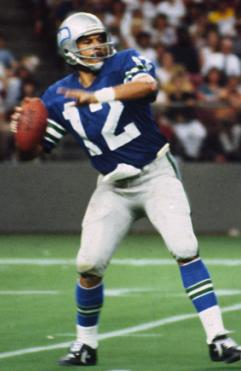

No. 12
- Position: Quarterback

Personal information
- Born: May 21, 1955 (age 71); Van Nuys, California, U.S.
- Listed height: 6 ft 2 in (1.88 m)
- Listed weight: 214 lb (97 kg)

Career information
- High school: Cleveland (Los Angeles)
- College: Wichita State
- NFL draft: 1977: 10th round, 254th overall pick

Career history
- Seattle Seahawks (1977–1982)

Career NFL statistics
- Pass attempts: 39
- Pass completions: 17
- Percentage: 43.6
- TD–INT: 2-4
- Passing yards: 232
- Passer rating: 40.7
- Stats at Pro Football Reference

Samuel Adam Adkins (born May 21, 1955) is an American former professional football player who was a quarterback for the Seattle Seahawks of the National Football League (NFL). He attended Cleveland High School in Reseda, California, and played college football for the Wichita State Shockers in Kansas.

Adkins was a 10th round selection of the Seahawks in the 1977 NFL draft. He played for them from 1977 to 1982 as a backup quarterback to Jim Zorn, and is the only member of the Seahawks to wear the number 12. In 1984, the number was retired in honor of the Seahawks fans.

Adkins was active for all 16 games during the 1978 season but did not see game action.

After hand surgery caused Adkins to miss the 1983 season, he retired.

He has since worked in broadcasting in the Seattle area, as the color commentator for the Washington Huskies football radio broadcasts and more extensively as a host and correspondent on the Seahawks postgame show.

He is married and has 4 children.
