= Tim Walker (American football) =

American football player (born 1958)

No. 56
- Position: Linebacker

Personal information
- Born: May 12, 1958 (age 68); Hartford, Connecticut, U.S.
- Listed height: 6 ft 1 in (1.85 m)
- Listed weight: 230 lb (104 kg)

Career information
- High school: Northside
- College: Savannah State
- NFL draft: 1980: undrafted

Career history
- Seattle Seahawks (1980)
- Stats at Pro Football Reference

Timothy Alan Walker (born May 12, 1958) is an American former professional football player who was a linebacker for the Seattle Seahawks of the National Football League (NFL). He played college football for the Savannah State Tigers and was inducted into the school's hall of fame in 2010.
