= Terry Rennaker =

American football player (born 1958)

No. 59
- Position: Linebacker

Personal information
- Born: May 1, 1958 (age 68); Newport, Rhode Island, U.S.
- Listed height: 6 ft 6 in (1.98 m)
- Listed weight: 225 lb (102 kg)

Career information
- High school: Kenmore (WA) Inglemoor
- College: Stanford
- NFL draft: 1980: undrafted

Career history
- Seattle Seahawks (1980)
- Stats at Pro Football Reference

Terry Rennaker (born May 1, 1958) is an American former professional football player who was a linebacker for the Seattle Seahawks of the National Football League (NFL) in 1980. He played college football for the Stanford Cardinal.
