= Vic Minor =

American football player (born 1958)

No. 21, 23, 25
- Position: Defensive back

Personal information
- Born: November 28, 1958 (age 67); Shreveport, Louisiana, U.S.
- Listed height: 6 ft 0 in (1.83 m)
- Listed weight: 198 lb (90 kg)

Career information
- High school: Woodlawn (Shreveport)
- College: Louisiana–Monroe
- NFL draft: 1980: 8th round, 204th overall pick

Career history
- Seattle Seahawks (1980–1981); Memphis Showboats (1984); San Antonio Gunslingers (1985)

Career NFL statistics
- Interceptions: 1
- Fumble recoveries: 2
- Stats at Pro Football Reference

Victor Wayne Minor (born November 28, 1958) is an American former professional football player who was a defensive back for the Seattle Seahawks of the National Football League (NFL). He played college football for the Louisiana–Monroe Warhawks.

Minor also played in the United States Football League (USFL) for the Memphis Showboats (1984) and the San Antonio Gunslingers (1985).
