= Jim Jodat =

American football player (1954–2015)

No. 43, 40
- Position: Running back

Personal information
- Born: March 3, 1954; Milwaukee, Wisconsin, U.S.
- Died: October 21, 2015 (aged 61); Lake Forest, California, U.S.
- Listed height: 5 ft 11 in (1.80 m)
- Listed weight: 210 lb (95 kg)

Career information
- High school: Pio Nono
- College: Carthage
- NFL draft: 1976: 12th round, 344th overall pick

Career history
- Los Angeles Rams (1976–1979); Seattle Seahawks (1980–1981); San Diego Chargers (1982–1983)

Career NFL statistics
- Rushing attempts -yards: 226-866
- Receptions-yards: 35-265
- Touchdowns: 10
- Stats at Pro Football Reference

James Steven Jodat (March 3, 1954 – October 21, 2015) was an American professional football player who was a running back for seven seasons for the Los Angeles Rams, the Seattle Seahawks, and the San Diego Chargers.

He was a high school player and wrestler for Pio Nono in St. Francis, Wisconsin, and was among the first alumni inducted into the Athletic Hall of Fame at the school's successor, St. Thomas More High School.

He played college football at Carthage College in Kenosha, Wisconsin, declining more attractive offers because Carthage was closer to his widowed mother's home in Milwaukee. He died from cancer in 2015.
