= Steve August =

American football player (born 1954)

No. 76, 77
- Position: Offensive tackle

Personal information
- Born: September 4, 1954 (age 72); Jeannette, Pennsylvania, U.S.
- Listed height: 6 ft 5 in (1.96 m)
- Listed weight: 270 lb (122 kg)

Career information
- High school: Jeannette
- College: Tulsa
- NFL draft: 1977: 1st round, 14th overall pick

Career history
- Seattle Seahawks (1977–1984); Pittsburgh Steelers (1984); New York Jets (1985)

Awards and highlights
- Third-team All-American (1976)

Career NFL statistics
- Games played: 102
- Games started: 91
- Fumble recoveries: 2
- Stats at Pro Football Reference

Steve Paul August (born September 4, 1954) is an American former professional football player who was an offensive tackle in the National Football League (NFL), primarily with the Seattle Seahawks. Through his eight years with the Seahawks he had started more games (90) at right tackle than any other Seahawk at that position, as of the end of the 2018 season.

He was traded to his hometown team the Pittsburgh Steelers midway through the 1984 season. He started the 1985 preseason with the Steelers and then was acquired off waivers during preseason by the New York Jets. He was on injured reserve for the first half of the 1985 season with the Jets. He retired at midseason of 1985. He played college football for the Tulsa Golden Hurricane.
