= Terry Dion =

American football player (born 1957)

No. 62
- Position: Defensive end

Personal information
- Born: November 22, 1957 (age 69); Shelton, Washington, U.S.
- Listed height: 6 ft 6 in (1.98 m)
- Listed weight: 254 lb (115 kg)

Career information
- High school: Shelton
- College: Oregon
- NFL draft: 1980: 4th round, 97th overall pick

Career history
- Seattle Seahawks (1980)

Career NFL statistics
- Sacks: 2.0
- Stats at Pro Football Reference

Terry Mark Dion (born November 22, 1957) is an American former professional football player who was a defensive end in the National Football League (NFL) who played for the Seattle Seahawks. He played college football for the Oregon Ducks. He now resides in Shelton, Washington, and taught at Aberdeen High School.
