= Jim Zorn =

American football player and coach (born 1953)

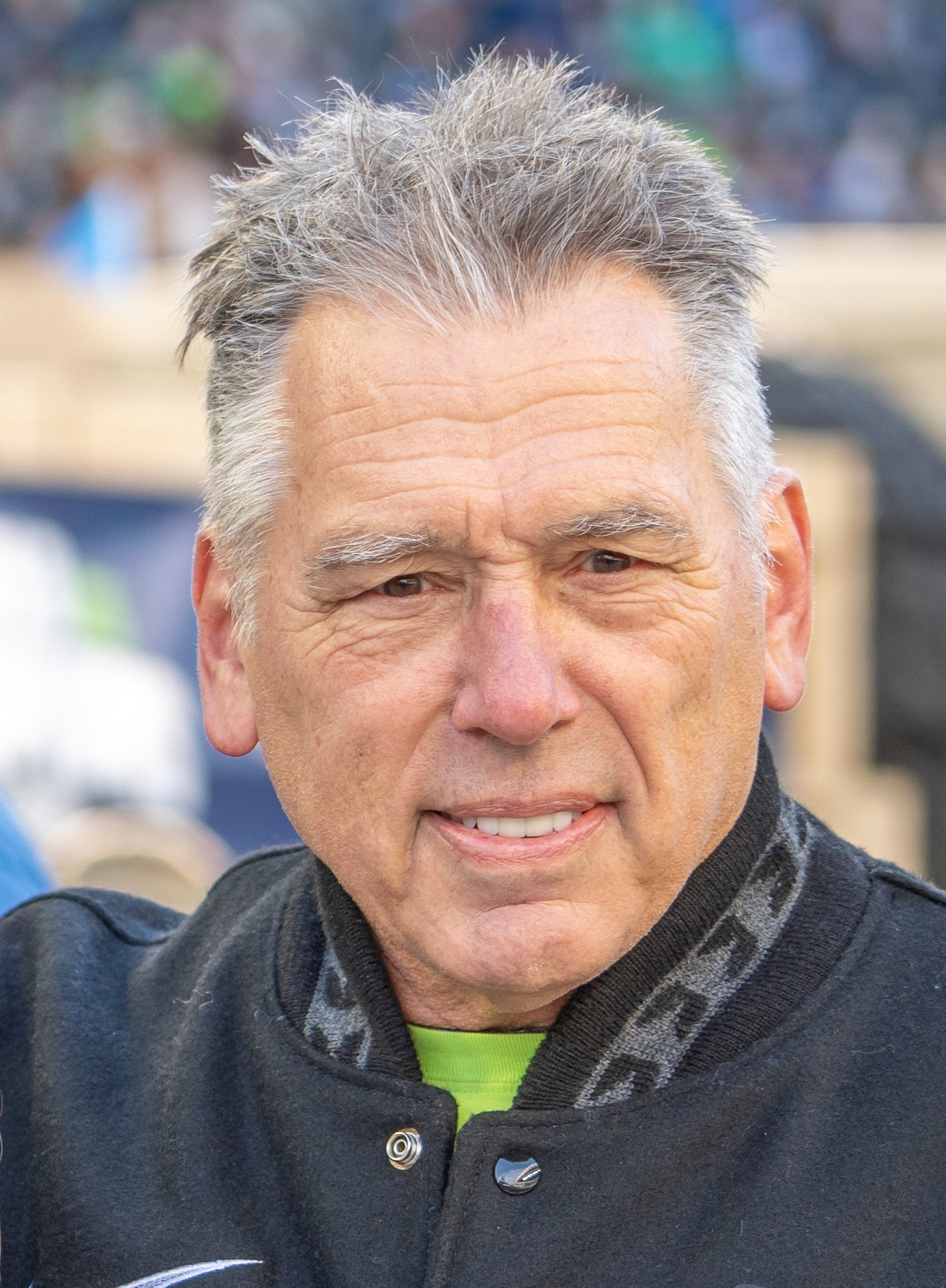
- Zorn in 2026

No. 10, 18, 15
- Position: Quarterback

Personal information
- Born: May 10, 1953 (age 73); Whittier, California, U.S.
- Listed height: 6 ft 2 in (1.88 m)
- Listed weight: 200 lb (91 kg)

Career information
- High school: Gahr (Cerritos, California)
- College: Cerritos College (1971–1972); Cal Poly Pomona (1973–1974)
- NFL draft: 1975: undrafted

Career history

Playing
- Dallas Cowboys (1975)*; Seattle Seahawks (1976–1984); Green Bay Packers (1985); Winnipeg Blue Bombers (1986); Tampa Bay Buccaneers (1987)
- * Offseason or practice squad member only

Coaching
- Boise State (1988–1991) Offensive assistant & quarterbacks coach; Utah State (1992–1994) Offensive coordinator; Minnesota (1995–1996) Quarterbacks coach; Seattle Seahawks (1997) Offensive assistant; Detroit Lions (1998–2000) Quarterbacks coach; Seattle Seahawks (2001–2007) Quarterbacks coach; Washington Redskins (2008–2009) Head coach; Baltimore Ravens (2010) Quarterbacks coach; Kansas City Chiefs (2011–2012) Quarterbacks coach; Seattle Dragons (2020) Head coach & general manager

Awards and highlights
- Second-team All-Pro (1978); PFWA All-Rookie Team (1976); Seattle Seahawks Top 50 players; Seattle Seahawks Ring of Honor

Career NFL statistics
- Passing attempts: 3,149
- Passing completions: 1,669
- Completion percentage: 53.0%
- TD–INT: 111–141
- Passing yards: 21,115
- Passer rating: 67.3
- Rushing yards: 1,504
- Rushing touchdowns: 17
- Stats at Pro Football Reference

Head coaching record
- Regular season: NFL: 12–20 (.375); XFL: 1–4 (.200)
- Coaching profile at Pro Football Reference

James Arthur Zorn (born May 10, 1953) is an American former professional football quarterback and coach who played in the National Football League (NFL) for 11 seasons. He spent his first eight seasons from 1976 to 1984 with the Seattle Seahawks, where he was the franchise's original starting quarterback. During his Seahawks tenure, Zorn received one second-team All-Pro selection and led the team to their first consecutive winning seasons in franchise history. Zorn was a member of the Green Bay Packers and Tampa Bay Buccaneers in his last two seasons. For his accomplishments in Seattle, he was inducted to the Seattle Seahawks Ring of Honor in 1991.

After retiring as a player, Zorn spent most of his coaching career as a quarterback coach. He also served as the head coach of the Washington Redskins from 2008 to 2009.

== Early life ==
Born in Whittier, California, Zorn attended Gahr High School in Cerritos, where he competed in football, baseball, basketball, track, and speed skating. He didn't start playing organized football until his sophomore season. The next year, Zorn broke his wrist after being put in at the end of a game to play quarterback. He became a starter as a senior in 1970 and graduated in 1971.

Zorn played at the junior college level at Cerritos College for two years. He was benched midway through his sophomore season in 1972 because the head coach didn't like his leadership style.

In 1973, he transferred to Cal Poly Pomona after accepting their half-scholarship offer. As a junior that season, he registered 2,367 passing yards and 16 touchdowns, receiving Little All-American, Little All-Coast, and Southern California College Division Player of the Year honors.

As a senior in 1974, Zorn's play was affected by coaching changes, posting 1,783 passing yards and six touchdowns. He finished his collegiate career with ten school records, 5,314 total yards, 4,150 passing yards, 22 passing touchdowns, 1,164 rushing yards and 18 rushing touchdowns.

Zorn also threw the javelin for the Broncos' track team.

== Professional career ==
Zorn was signed as an undrafted free agent by the Dallas Cowboys in 1975, the same year they had their famed Dirty Dozen draft. He was the Cowboys' last cut two days before the start of the 1975 season, to make room for running back Preston Pearson, who had been waived by the Pittsburgh Steelers. He had a try-out with the Los Angeles Rams, but was not signed. The Seattle Seahawks signed him as a free agent in 1976, reuniting with Dick Mansperger, who was the Cowboys' director of player personnel the previous year.

He would become a star starting QB for the Seahawks in their early days from 1976 to 1983, before his position was taken by Dave Krieg and he was demoted to second-string quarterback midway through the 1983 season. He held second-string/backup quarterback positions with the Seahawks (1983–84), the Packers (1985), the Winnipeg Blue Bombers of the Canadian Football League (1986), and the Tampa Bay Buccaneers (1987), before retiring from football following the 1987 NFL season.

=== Seattle Seahawks (1976–1984) ===
After spending a year out of football, he signed as a free agent with the Seattle Seahawks in 1976. Zorn is closely associated with his favorite passing target, Hall of Fame wide receiver Steve Largent. Largent was the first Seahawk inducted into the team's "Ring of Honor" (1989), and Zorn was second (1991). Zorn was named AFC Offensive Rookie of the Year by the National Football League Players Association following the team's inaugural 1976 season. He was also the Seahawks' team MVP, throwing for 12 touchdowns and rushing for four touchdowns. His three consecutive 3,000-yard seasons were tops in team history, since broken by Matt Hasselbeck in 2005, and he was the first Seattle quarterback to record back-to-back 300-plus yard games—a feat he accomplished twice.

He earned second-team All-Pro honors for the 1978 season, when the Seahawks had the third-best offense in the league.

He was succeeded by Dave Krieg midway through the 1983 season, the year the Seahawks first made the NFL playoffs. Zorn stayed with the team as a second-string quarterback until the end of the 1984 season.

Zorn was well known as one of the more prolific scrambling quarterbacks of his day, and he was named the eighth-best mobile quarterback by NFL.com in 2008.

=== Green Bay Packers and Winnipeg Blue Bombers (1985–1986) ===
The Green Bay Packers signed Zorn to the second-string quarterback position in 1985. The Packers finished the season 8–8, 2nd in the NFC Central, but did not make the playoffs. The Packers released Zorn in the off-season, and he decided to take a season off from the NFL and signed on to a backup quarterback position with the CFL's Winnipeg Blue Bombers in 1986, where he dressed for nine games before leaving the team and being released once again.

=== Tampa Bay Buccaneers and retirement (1987) ===
Zorn returned to the NFL in 1987 with the Tampa Bay Buccaneers. He played one final game as a replacement player during the 1987 NFL strike before officially retiring. The 1987 Bucs finished the season 4–11 and missed the playoffs.

In the NFL, Zorn threw for 21,115 yards and 111 touchdowns, completing 53% of his passes. He also ran for another 17 touchdowns.

== NFL career statistics ==
Legend
	Led the league
**Bold**	Career high

Year	Team	Games			Passing								Rushing			
Year	Team	GP	GS	Record	Cmp	Att	Pct	Yds	Y/A	TD	Int	Rtg	Att	Yds	Avg	TD
1976	SEA	14	14	2–12	208	439	47.4	2,571	5.9	12	**27**	49.5	52	246	4.7	4
1977	SEA	10	10	4–6	104	251	41.4	1,687	6.7	16	19	54.3	25	141	5.6	1
1978	SEA	**16**	**16**	**9–7**	248	443	56.0	3,283	**7.4**	15	20	72.1	**59**	**290**	4.9	**6**
1979	SEA	**16**	**16**	**9–7**	**285**	**505**	56.4	**3,661**	7.2	**20**	18	77.7	46	279	6.1	2
1980	SEA	**16**	**16**	4–12	276	488	56.6	3,346	6.9	17	20	72.3	44	214	4.9	1
1981	SEA	13	13	4–9	236	397	**59.4**	2,788	7.0	13	9	**82.4**	30	140	4.7	1
1982	SEA	9	7	4–3	126	245	51.4	1,540	6.3	7	11	61.9	15	113	**7.5**	1
1983	SEA	**16**	8	4–4	103	205	50.2	1,166	5.7	7	7	64.8	30	71	2.4	1
1984	SEA	**16**	0	—	7	17	41.2	80	4.7	0	2	16.4	7	-3	-0.4	0
1985	GB	13	5	3–2	56	123	45.5	794	6.5	4	6	57.4	10	9	0.9	0
1987	TB	1	1	1–0	20	36	55.6	199	5.5	0	2	48.3	4	4	1.0	0
Career		140	106	44–62	1,669	3,149	53.0	21,115	6.7	111	141	67.3	322	1,504	4.7	17

== Coaching career ==
=== College assistant coach (1988–1996) ===
After his playing career concluded, Zorn returned to college football as an assistant coach. His first stop was at Boise State University, in the Big Sky Conference, where he was the quarterbacks coach for four seasons under head coach Skip Hall, from 1988 to 1991. He then served as the offensive coordinator for Utah State from 1992 to 1994. From 1995 to 1996 Zorn coached the quarterbacks at the Minnesota Golden Gophers football.

=== NFL assistant coach (1997–2007, 2010–2012) ===
Zorn moved up to the pro coaching ranks in 1997 with the Seattle Seahawks as quarterbacks coach under head coach Dennis Erickson. He then spent three seasons with the Detroit Lions (1998–2000) under head coach Bobby Ross, and was instrumental in the development of rookie quarterback Charlie Batch in 1998. Batch's 88.3 passer rating that season ranks as the fourth-highest rookie mark in NFL history.

He returned to Seattle in 2001 and worked with head coach Mike Holmgren and offensive coordinator Gil Haskell in implementing the team's offense while also furthering the development of the team's quarterbacks. In 2003, Zorn tutored Matt Hasselbeck, who set a franchise record with 3,841 passing yards. Hasselbeck became the franchise's most-efficient passer (85.1 rating) while joining Zorn as the only Seahawks’ quarterback to pass for 3,000-plus yards in three consecutive seasons. In 2007 under Zorn, Hasselbeck set Seattle single-season marks for attempts (562), completions (352) and yards (3,966). He also threw for a career-high 28 touchdowns en route to his third Pro Bowl selection.

After two seasons as head coach of the Washington Redskins, Zorn was hired in 2010 by the Baltimore Ravens as their quarterbacks coach to replace Hue Jackson, who departed to the Oakland Raiders. Under Zorn, quarterback Joe Flacco reached career high totals in touchdowns (25) and quarterback rating (93.6), as well as a career-low 10 interceptions. The Ravens also improved from 9-7 the previous season to 12–4. Despite this, Zorn was fired by the Ravens at the end of the season. Flacco gave Zorn his approval and support, vocally objecting to the firing.

He was hired in 2011 by the Kansas City Chiefs as their quarterbacks coach and stayed through the 2012 season. When Andy Reid took over as head coach after the 2012 season, he brought in a brand new coaching staff.

=== NFL head coach (2008–2009) ===
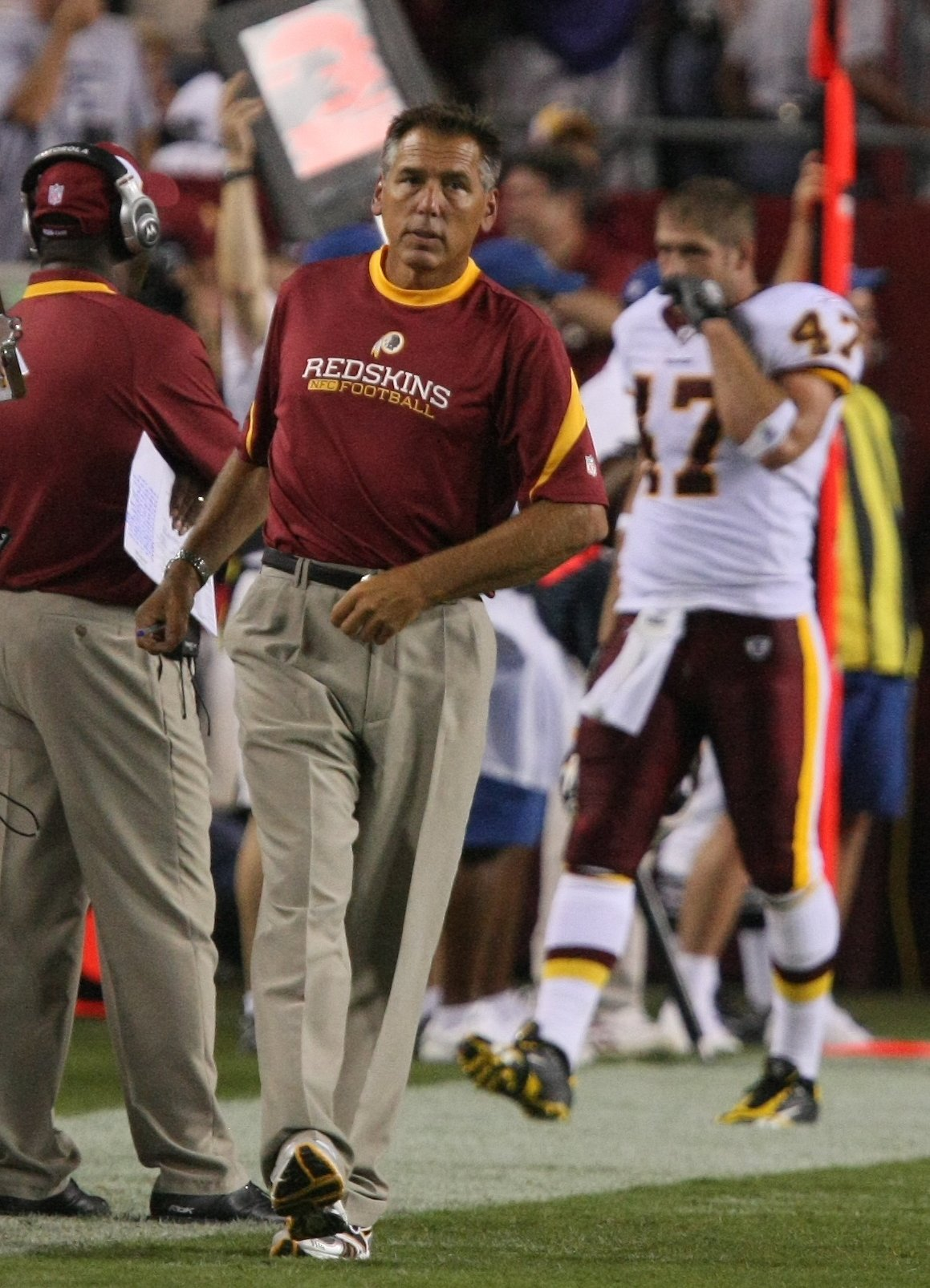
Zorn as Washington Redskins head coach in 2009

After Washington Redskins head coach Joe Gibbs retired in January 2008, owner Daniel Snyder hired Zorn as the team's new offensive coordinator. Two weeks after being hired, he was promoted as the team's head coach. In a surprise move, Snyder made him the Redskins' new head coach, on February 10, 2008, having never served as a coordinator at the pro level. He was the fourth head coach hired by Snyder since he bought the team in 1999. Zorn earned his first professional coaching victory with a 29–24 win over the New Orleans Saints in week 2 of the 2008 NFL season. In week 4 of the 2008 season, Zorn became the only Redskins head coach to win his first game at Texas Stadium against the rival Dallas Cowboys (2008 was the Cowboys' last year at their stadium in Irving, Texas, which opened in October 1971. The Cowboys moved to Cowboys Stadium for the 2009 season. George Allen won his first game vs. the Cowboys in Dallas as Redskins' coach in 1971, but that game was played at the Cotton Bowl.).

Zorn complemented the Redskins’ bruising running attack with his version of the West Coast Offense, a combination that helped the Redskins finish eighth in the NFL in rushing yards per game (130.9). Zorn started his tenure with the Redskins by leading the team to a 6–2 record for the first half of the season, but subsequently finished the season going 2–6 with an overall 8–8 record. However Zorn's new offense produced four starters who earned Pro Bowl honors. Running back Clinton Portis, finished fourth in the NFL in rushing yards (1,487). Tight end Chris Cooley earned his second consecutive Pro Bowl appearance and led the team with a career-high 83 receptions for 849 yards. Offensive Tackle Chris Samuels earned his sixth Pro Bowl appearance—marking the third-most in franchise history, while fullback Mike Sellers earned his first Pro Bowl selection in his eighth NFL season.

Six games into the 2009 season, with a record of two wins and four losses, the Washington Redskins relieved Zorn of offensive play calling duties, assigning them to assistant coach Sherman Lewis following the Redskins' loss to the Kansas City Chiefs on October 18.

In the early morning of January 4, 2010, it was reported that Zorn had been fired after the final game of the regular season, a loss to the San Diego Chargers. He failed to make the playoffs in either of his seasons as head coach of the Redskins. He was replaced by former Broncos coach Mike Shanahan. Jim Zorn has since given a series of interviews with the local Washington, D.C. networks in which he expressed disappointment in the handling of his dismissal.

=== XFL (2020) ===
On February 25, 2019, Zorn was announced to be the GM and head coach of the Seattle Dragons. He was not retained after the league's bankruptcy and sale.

== Head coaching record ==
=== NFL ===
Team	Year	Regular season					Postseason			
Team	Year	Won	Lost	Ties	Win %	Finish	Won	Lost	Win %	Result
WAS	2008	8	8	0	.500	4th in NFC East	–	–	–	–
WAS	2009	4	12	0	.250	4th in NFC East	–	–	–	–
Total		12	20	0	.375		–	–	–	–

=== XFL ===
Team	Year	Regular season					Postseason			
Team	Year	Won	Lost	Ties	Win %	Finish	Won	Lost	Win %	Result
SEA	2020	1	4	0	.200	TBD	0	0	.000	TBD
Total		1	4	0	.200		0	0	.000	

== Personal life ==
Zorn and his wife, Joy, have four children: daughters Rachael, Sarah, and Danielle and son Isaac. Jim and Joy Zorn are active in Medical Teams International and Pro Athletes Outreach. Medical Teams International is dedicated to implementing and supporting programs that address the causes and effects of inadequate health care worldwide.

Zorn currently resides with his wife on Mercer Island, a suburb of Seattle. The couple is active in the local community, and attend Encounter Church.

He is noted for his interest in mountain biking, kayaking and other outdoor sports. He continued to mountain bike even as he approached the age of 70. When he was a player with the Seattle Seahawks, he experimented with building bikes for off-road riding with the help of the owner of Mercer Island Cyclery.

Zorn was inducted into the State of Washington Sports Hall of Fame during a pregame ceremony prior to Washington's game at Seattle on November 23, 2008.
