= Andre Hines =

American football player (born 1958)

No. 73
- Position: Offensive tackle

Personal information
- Born: February 28, 1958 (age 68); Oakland, California, U.S.
- Listed height: 6 ft 6 in (1.98 m)
- Listed weight: 275 lb (125 kg)

Career information
- High school: St. Mary's College (Berkeley, California)
- College: Stanford
- NFL draft: 1980: 2nd round, 44th overall pick

Career history
- Seattle Seahawks (1980); Miami Dolphins (1981)*; Philadelphia Eagles (1982)*
- * Offseason or practice squad member only

Career NFL statistics
- Games played: 9
- Stats at Pro Football Reference

Andre Pierre Hines (born February 28, 1958) is an American former professional football player who was an offensive tackle in the National Football League (NFL). He was selected by the Seattle Seahawks in the second round of the 1980 NFL draft. He played college football for the Stanford Cardinal.
