= Louis Bullard =

American football player (1956–2010)

No. 72
- Position: Offensive tackle

Personal information
- Born: May 6, 1956; Hernando, Mississippi, U.S.
- Died: April 18, 2010 (aged 53); Franklin, Tennessee, U.S.
- Listed height: 6 ft 6 in (1.98 m)
- Listed weight: 265 lb (120 kg)

Career information
- High school: Horn Lake (Horn Lake, Mississippi)
- College: Jackson State (1974–1977)
- NFL draft: 1978: 5th round, 119th overall pick

Career history
- Seattle Seahawks (1978–1980); Cleveland Browns (1982)*; Boston/New Orleans/Portland Breakers (1983–1985)
- * Offseason or practice squad member only

Career NFL statistics
- Games played: 35
- Games started: 15
- Stats at Pro Football Reference

Louis Eugene Bullard (May 6, 1956 – April 18, 2010) was an American professional football offensive tackle who played three seasons with the Seattle Seahawks of the National Football League (NFL). He was selected by the Seahawks in the fifth round of the 1978 NFL draft after playing college football at Jackson State University. He also played for the Boston/New Orleans/Portland Breakers of the United States Football League (USFL).

== Early life and college ==
Louis Eugene Bullard was born on May 6, 1956, in Hernando, Mississippi. He attended Horn Lake High School in Horn Lake, Mississippi.

Bullard was a member of the Jackson State Tigers of Jackson State University from 1974 to 1977. He was inducted into the Jackson State University Sports Hall of Fame in 1994.

== Professional career ==
Bullard was selected by the Seattle Seahawks in the fifth round, with the 119th overall pick, of the 1978 NFL draft. He officially signed with the team on June 14. He played in all 16 games for the Seahawks during his rookie year in 1978. He appeared in three games, starting two, in 1979 before being placed on injured reserve on September 18, 1979. Bullard played in all 16 games, starting 13, during the 1980 season as Seattle went 4–12. He was released by the Seahawks on August 31, 1981.

Bullard signed with the Cleveland Browns on May 12 1982, but was later released on August 21, 1982.

Bullard was signed by the Boston Breakers of the United States Football League (USFL) on January 20, 1983. He played in 15 games, starting 14, for the Breakers during the 1983 USFL season. He started all 18 games for the newly-renamed New Orleans Breakers in 1984 as the team finished the season with an 8–10 record. Bullard was also a member of the, once again, newly-renamed Portland Breakers in 1985.

== Personal life ==
Bullard's son, Alex Bullard, played college football at Notre Dame and Tennessee, and spent the 2014 offseason with the Detroit Lions.

He died of cancer on April 18, 2010, in Franklin, Tennessee.
