= Jeff Moore (running back) =

American football player (born 1956)

No. 32, 25, 30
- Position: Running back

Personal information
- Born: August 20, 1956; Kosciusko, Mississippi, U.S.
- Listed height: 6 ft 0 in (1.83 m)
- Listed weight: 195 lb (88 kg)

Career information
- College: Jackson State
- NFL draft: 1979: 12th round, 319th overall pick

Career history
- Seattle Seahawks (1979–1981); San Francisco 49ers (1982–1983); Washington Redskins (1984)

Career NFL statistics
- Rushing yards: 722
- Rushing average: 3.5
- Rushing touchdowns: 7
- Stats at Pro Football Reference

Jeffery Dwayne Moore (born August 20, 1956) is an American former professional football player who was a running back in the National Football League (NFL) for the Seattle Seahawks, the San Francisco 49ers and the Washington Redskins. He played college football at Jackson State University and was selected 319th overall in the 12th round of the 1979 NFL draft.
