= Bishop Carroll High School =

Bishop Carroll High School may refer to one of the following Catholic high schools:

- Bishop Carroll High School (Calgary, Alberta) in Calgary, Alberta, Canada
- Bishop Carroll High School (Ebensburg, Pennsylvania) in Ebensburg, Pennsylvania, USA
- Bishop Carroll Catholic High School (Wichita, Kansas) in Wichita, Kansas, USA

The acronym BCHS might also refer to:

- Baruch College Campus High School in New York, New York, USA

== See also ==
- BCHS (disambiguation)
