= 1979 Seattle Seahawks season =

American football team season

- Owner: The Nordstrom family
- General manager: John Thompson
- Head coach: Jack Patera
- Home stadium: Kingdome

Results
- Record: 9–7
- Division place: 3rd AFC West
- Playoffs: Did not qualify
- All-Pros: WR Steve Largent (2nd team)
- Pro Bowlers: WR Steve Largent

The 1979 Seattle Seahawks season was the team's fourth season in the National Football League (NFL). The Seahawks had a winning record for the second consecutive year, matching their 9–7 record from 1978.

Starting off the season with a 1–4 record, the Seahawks rallied to finish 9–7. Season highlights included a sweep of the Oakland Raiders for the second straight year, and winning both of their Monday Night Football contests on the road against the Atlanta Falcons and at home against the New York Jets, where Jim Zorn completed 13 passes in a row in a 30–7 victory. The team also enjoyed their first victory over the Denver Broncos 28–23 on a 43-yard touchdown pass from Zorn to Steve Largent in the final minutes.

Season lowlights included a 37–34 loss in Denver, after leading 34–10 midway through the 3rd quarter. The Los Angeles Rams shut out the Seattle Seahawks 24–0, holding the Seahawks to −7 yards total offense, and only one first down. The team lost twice to the Kansas City Chiefs, including a 37–21 defeat in week 14 that eliminated Seattle from playoff contention. The team also lost running back David Sims, who led the AFC in touchdowns in 1978, to a career-ending injury.

The 1979 season was the franchise's last winning season until 1983 when new head coach Chuck Knox led the Seahawks to their first playoff berth and Championship game appearance.

== Offseason ==
=== Draft ===
1979 Seattle Seahawks draft
Round	Pick	Player	Position	College	Notes
1	18	Manu Tuiasosopo	Defensive tackle	UCLA	
2	45	Joe Norman	Linebacker	Indiana	
3	57	Michael Jackson	Linebacker	Washington	
4	102	Mark Bell	Defensive end	Colorado State	
7	169	Larry Polowski	Linebacker	Boise State	
9	240	Ezra Tate	Running back	Mississippi College	
10	267	Robert Hardy	Defensive tackle	Jackson State	
11	293	Jim Hinesly	Guard	Michigan State	
12	319	Jeff Moore	Running Back	Jackson State	
Made roster

=== Undrafted free agents ===
1979 undrafted free agents of note
Player	Position	College
Chuck Benbow	Fullback	Long Beach State
Tim Beyer	Tight end	Oregon
Bob Cale	Safety	North Carolina
David Charles	Wide receiver	Wisconsin
Robert Chatman	Wide receiver	Mississippi State
Mark Conrad	Punter	Puget Sound
Gary Davis	Running back	Texas A&M
Howard Dodge	Linebacker	Nevada
Max Ediger	Fullback	Kansas
Tim Ellis	Quarterback	Ole Miss
Jim Frith	Linebacker	Rice
Bob Grefseng	Linebacker	Ole Miss
Dwayne Hall	Wide receiver	Oregon State
Chuck Harbin	Guard	Central Michigan
Gus Hobus	Tight end	Washington State
Dave Hopewell	Tackle	Kentucky
Tom Jesko	Tackle	Kent State
Mike Johnson	Safety	UC Davis
Greg Laetsch	Wide receiver/Tight end	Furman
James Lamar	Linebacker	San Diego State
Jim Mickelson	Safety	Montana State
Jeff Morgan	Wide receiver	Alabama State
Mark Murphy	Tackle/Guard	Long Beach State
John Patterson	Cornerback	Syracuse
Bucky Shamburger	Wide receiver	Georgia Tech
Mark Stevenson	Center	Western Illinois
Clarence Steward	Linebacker	Arkansas–Pine Bluff
Ken Thomas	Defensive End	Cameron
Brant Tunget	Tight end	Fresno State
Ross Varner	Defensive end	BYU
Phil Vierneisel	Punter	Illinois
Ike Williams	Running back	Florida A&M
Theodis Williams	Wide receiver	Arkansas Tech
Jay Wyatt	Punter	Houston

== Personnel ==
=== Staff ===
1979 Seattle Seahawks staff
**Front office**: Managing general partner – Herman Sarkowsky; general manager – John Thompson; Assistant general manager – Mark Duncan; Director of player personnel – Dick Mansperger; Director of pro scouting – Chuck Allen; **Head coaches**: Head coach – Jack Patera; **Offensive coaches**: Offensive/quarterbacks/receivers – Jerry Rhome; Offensive backs – Andy MacDonald; Offensive line – Howard Mudd	**Defensive coaches**: Defensive/linebackers – Larry Peccatiello; Defensive line – Jim E. Mora; Defensive backs – Jack Christiansen; **Special teams coaches**: Special teams – Rusty Tillman; **Strength and conditioning**: Head trainer – Bruce Scott; Assistant trainer – Jim Whitesel

=== Final roster ===
1979 Seattle Seahawks roster
**Quarterbacks (QB)**: 12 Sam Adkins; 16 Steve Myer; **10** Jim Zorn; **Running backs (RB)**: 31 Tony Benjamin; **33** Dan Doornink; 34 Tony Green; 24 Al Hunter; 32 Jeff Moore; **47** Sherman Smith; **Wide receivers (WR)**: 86 Jessie Green; **80** Steve Largent; **84** Sam McCullum; 83 Steve Raible; **Tight ends (TE)**: 82 Mark Bell; **88** Brian Peets	**Offensive linemen (OL)**: **76** Steve August T; **63** Nick Bebout T; 60 Ron Coder G; 69 Bill Fifer T; 54 Art Kuehn G/C; **61** Tom Lynch G; 70 Jeff Sevy T; **51** John Yarno C; **Defensive linemen (DL)**: 68 Dennis Boyd DE; 67 Bill Cooke DT; **71** Carl Eller DE; **77** Bill Gregory DE; **75** Robert Hardy DT; **74** Manu Tuiasosopo DT	**Linebackers (LB)**: **58** Terry Beeson MLB; **53** Keith Butler OLB; 57 Peter Cronan MLB; **56** Sammy Green OLB; 55 Michael Jackson OLB; 52 Joe Norman OLB; 50 Larry Polowski OLB; **Defensive backs (DB)**: **27** Autry Beamon FS; **22** Dave Brown CB; 44 John Harris FS; 26 Kerry Justin CB; 20 Mike O'Brien SS; **42** Keith Simpson SS; **38** Cornell Webster CB; **Special teams (ST)**: 1 Efrén Herrera K; 18 Herman Weaver P	**Reserve**: 85 Mike Allen WR (IR); 72 Louis Bullard T (IR); 25 Don Dufek S (IR); **78** Bob Newton (IR); 66 Bill Sandifer DT (IR); 81 John Sawyer TE (IR); 35 David Sims RB (IR); 30 Ezra Tate RB (IR); Rookies in italics 45 active, 8 reserve

- Starters in bold.
- (*) Denotes players that were selected for the 1980 Pro Bowl.

== Schedule ==
=== Preseason ===
Week	Date	Opponent	Result	Record	Venue	Recap
1	August 2	Minnesota Vikings	**W** 12–9	1–0	Kingdome	Recap
2	August 12	Dallas Cowboys	**W** 27–17	2–0	Kingdome	Recap
3	August 18	at Los Angeles Rams	**L** 17–21	2–1	Los Angeles Memorial Coliseum	Recap
4	August 24	San Francisco 49ers	**W** 55–20	3–1	Kingdome	Recap

Source: Seahawks Media Guides

=== Regular season ===
Divisional matchups have the AFC West playing the NFC West.

Week	Date	Opponent	Result	Record	Venue	Recap
1	September 2	**San Diego Chargers**	**L** 16–33	0–1	Kingdome	Recap
2	September 9	at Miami Dolphins	**L** 10–19	0–2	Miami Orange Bowl	Recap
3	September 16	**Oakland Raiders**	**W** 27–10	1–2	Kingdome	Recap
4	September 23	at **Denver Broncos**	**L** 34–37	1–3	Mile High Stadium	Recap
5	September 30	**Kansas City Chiefs**	**L** 6–24	1–4	Kingdome	Recap
6	October 7	at San Francisco 49ers	**W** 35–24	2–4	Candlestick Park	Recap
7	October 14	at **San Diego Chargers**	**L** 10–20	2–5	San Diego Stadium	Recap
8	October 21	Houston Oilers	**W** 34–14	3–5	Kingdome	Recap
9	October 29	at Atlanta Falcons	**W** 31–28	4–5	Atlanta–Fulton County Stadium	Recap
10	November 4	Los Angeles Rams	**L** 0–24	4–6	Kingdome	Recap
11	November 11	at Cleveland Browns	**W** 29–24	5–6	Cleveland Stadium	Recap
12	November 18	New Orleans Saints	**W** 38–24	6–6	Kingdome	Recap
13	November 26	New York Jets	**W** 30–7	7–6	Kingdome	Recap
14	December 2	at **Kansas City Chiefs**	**L** 21–37	7–7	Arrowhead Stadium	Recap
15	December 8	**Denver Broncos**	**W** 28–23	8–7	Kingdome	Recap
16	December 16	at **Oakland Raiders**	**W** 29–24	9–7	Oakland–Alameda County Coliseum	Recap
Note: Intra-division opponents are in **bold** text.

Source: 1979 NFL season results

== Standings ==
AFC West
	W	L	T	PCT	DIV	CONF	PF	PA	STK
^{(1)} San Diego Chargers	12	4	0	.750	6–2	9–3	411	246	W2
^{(5)} Denver Broncos	10	6	0	.625	4–4	7–5	289	262	L2
Seattle Seahawks	9	7	0	.563	3–5	6–6	378	372	W2
Oakland Raiders	9	7	0	.563	3–5	5–7	365	337	L1
Kansas City Chiefs	7	9	0	.438	4–4	7–7	238	262	L1

== Game summaries ==
For the second straight year, the Seahawks missed the playoffs by one game. Season highlights included sweeping the Oakland Raiders for the 2nd straight year, and defeating the Denver Broncos for the 1st time in team history in a comeback thriller 28–23 at the Kingdome, and winning the team's first appearance on MNF over the Atlanta Falcons, 31–28. The team started out 3–5, and had a 6–2 finish. A 37–21 loss to the Kansas City Chiefs in week 14 knocked them out of playoff contention, but rebounded to end their season repeating 1978 at 9–7.

=== Preseason ===
==== Week P1: vs. Minnesota Vikings ====
Preseason Week One: Seattle Seahawks vs. Minnesota Vikings – Game summary

Quarter	1	2	3	4	OT	Total
Vikings	0	6	0	3	0	9
Seahawks	9	0	0	0	3	12

at Kingdome, Seattle

- Date: August 2
- Game time: 7:30 pm local
- Game weather: indoors
- Game attendance: 60,881
- Referee: Ben Dreith
- TV: KIRO tape delay
- Gamebook

==== Week P2: vs. Dallas Cowboys ====
Preseason Week Two: Seattle Seahawks vs. Dallas Cowboys – Game summary

Quarter	1	2	3	4	Total
Cowboys	7	0	3	7	17
Seahawks	7	7	3	10	27

at Kingdome, Seattle

- Date: August 12
- Game time: 6:09 pm local
- Game weather: indoors
- Game attendance: 59,960
- Referee: Fred Silva
- TV: ABC tape delay
- Gamebook

==== Week P3: at Los Angeles Rams ====
Preseason Week Three: Seattle Seahawks at Los Angeles Rams – Game summary

Quarter	1	2	3	4	Total
Seahawks	7	7	0	3	17
Rams	7	0	14	0	21

at Candlestick Park, San Francisco

- Date: August 18
- Game time: 7:05 pm local
- Game weather: overcast, 72 °F (22 °C), wind W light
- Game attendance: 46,083
- Referee: Dick Jorgensen
- TV: KIRO
- Gamebook

==== Week P4: vs. San Francisco 49ers ====
Preseason Week Four: Seattle Seahawks vs. San Francisco 49ers – Game summary

Quarter	1	2	3	4	Total
49ers	0	0	0	20	20
Seahawks	17	17	21	0	55

at Kingdome, Seattle

- Date: August 24
- Game time: 7:34 pm local
- Game weather: indoors
- Game attendance: 59,941
- Referee: Cal Lepore
- TV: KIRO tape delay
- Gamebook

=== Regular season ===
==== Week 1: vs. San Diego Chargers ====
Week One: Seattle Seahawks vs. San Diego Chargers – Game summary

Quarter	1	2	3	4	Total
Chargers	0	13	10	10	33
Seahawks	3	7	0	6	16

at Kingdome, Seattle

- Date: September 2
- Game time: 1:02 pm local
- Game weather: indoors
- Game attendance: 62,887
- Referee: Ben Dreith
- TV announcers (NBC): Sam Nover and Mike Haffner
- Gamebook

Game information

First quarter

- SEA – Efrén Herrera 34-yard field goal, 8:26 (SEA 3–0)

Second quarter

- SD – Clarence Williams 1-yard run (Rolf Benirschke kick), 14:56 (SD 7–3)
- SD – Rolf Benirschke 31-yard field goal, 11:16 (SD 10–3)
- SEA – Sherman Smith 4-yard run (Efrén Herrera kick), 4:51 (Tied 10–10)
- SD – Rolf Benirschke 42-yard field goal, 0:28 (SD 13–10)

Third quarter

- SD – Rolf Benirschke 22-yard field goal, 3:41 (SD 16–10)
- SD – Clarence Williams 13-yard run (Rolf Benirschke kick), 0:00 (SD 23–10)

Fourth quarter

- SD – Mike Thomas 1-yard run (Rolf Benirschke kick), 5:09 (SD 30–10)
- SD – Rolf Benirschke 23-yard field goal, 1:56 (SD 33–10)
- SEA – Sherman Smith 6-yard run (PAT failed), 0:24 (SD 33–16)

Top passers

- SD – Dan Fouts: 21/30, 224 yds, 1 INT
- SEA – Jim Zorn: 16/28, 153 yds, 3 INT

Top rushers

- SD – Clarence Williams: 14 car, 73 yds, 2 TD
- SEA – Sherman Smith: 18 car, 95 yds, 2 TD

Top receivers

- SD – Artie Owens: 4 rec, 42 yds
- SEA – Steve Largent: 2 rec, 45 yds

Team – pass – rush – total – to

- SD – 217 – 139 – 356 – 1
- SEA – 153 – 181 – 334 – 6

==== Week 2: at Miami Dolphins ====
Week Two: Seattle Seahawks at Miami Dolphins – Game summary

Quarter	1	2	3	4	Total
Seahawks	0	3	7	0	10
Dolphins	0	9	3	7	19

at Orange Bowl, Miami

- Date: September 9
- Game time: 4:01 pm local
- Game weather: cloudy, 82 °F (28 °C), 81% humidity, wind SE 8 miles per hour (13 km/h)
- Game attendance: 56,233
- Referee: Jim Tunney
- TV announcers (NBC): Don Criqui and Bob Trumpy
- Gamebook

Game information

First quarter

- No scoring plays

Second quarter

- MIA – Nat Moore 3-yard pass from Bob Griese (PAT failed), 11:56 (MIA 6–0)
- SEA – Efrén Herrera 32-yard field goal, 3:23 (MIA 6–3)
- MIA – Uwe von Schamann 36-yard field goal, 0:20 (MIA 9–3)

Third quarter

- SEA – Steve Raible 23-yard pass from Jim Zorn (Efrén Herrera kick), 9:26 (SEA 10–9)
- MIA – Uwe von Schamann 31-yard field goal, 1:00 (MIA 12–9)

Fourth quarter

- MIA – Norm Bulaich 7-yard pass from Bob Griese (Uwe von Schamann kick), 9:08 (MIA 19–10)

Top passers

- SEA – Jim Zorn: 21/45, 247 yds, 1 TD, 3 INT
- MIA – Bob Griese: 15/27, 208 yds, 2 TD

Top rushers

- SEA – Sherman Smith: 11 car, 59 yds
- MIA – Larry Csonka: 13 car, 48 yds

Top receivers

- SEA – Sherman Smith: 7 rec, 80 yds
- MIA – Duriel Harris: 5 rec, 117 yds

Team – pass – rush – total – to

- SEA – 226 – 119 – 345 – 4
- MIA – 198 – 117 – 315 – 2

==== Week 3: vs. Oakland Raiders ====
Week Three: Seattle Seahawks vs. Oakland Raiders – Game summary

Quarter	1	2	3	4	Total
Raiders	0	0	7	3	10
Seahawks	7	3	10	7	27

at Kingdome, Seattle

- Date: September 16
- Game time: 1:02 pm local
- Game weather: indoors
- Game attendance: 61,602
- Referee: Gordon McCarter
- TV announcers (NBC): Marv Albert and Mike Haffner
- Gamebook

Game information

First quarter

- SEA – Steve Largent 40-yard pass from Jim Zorn (Efrén Herrera kick), 11:08 (SEA 7–0)

Second quarter

- SEA – Efrén Herrera 46-yard field goal, 6:50 (SEA 10–0)

Third quarter

- OAK – Rich Martini 12-yard pass from Ken Stabler (Jim Breech kick), 10:41 (SEA 10–7)
- SEA – Efrén Herrera 20-yard field goal, 6:37 (SEA 13–7)
- SEA – Steve Largent 21-yard pass from Jim Zorn (Efrén Herrera kick), 6:15 (SEA 20–7)

Fourth quarter

- OAK – Jim Breech 37-yard field goal, 13:05 (SEA 20–10)
- SEA – Sherman Smith 7-yard pass from Jim Zorn (Efrén Herrera kick), 0:00 (SEA 27–10)

Top passers

- OAK – Ken Stabler: 25/37, 343 yds, 1 TD, 2 INT
- SEA – Jim Zorn: 13/22, 277 yds, 3 TD

Top rushers

- OAK – Mark van Eeghen: 10 car, 54 yds
- SEA – Dan Doornink: 15 car, 52 yds

Top receivers

- OAK – Cliff Branch: 7 rec, 156 yds
- SEA – Steve Largent: 5 rec, 139 yds, 2 TD

Team – pass – rush – total – to

- OAK – 329 – 102 – 431 – 4
- SEA – 316 – 103 – 419 – 0

==== Week 4: at Denver Broncos ====
Week Four: Seattle Seahawks at Denver Broncos – Game summary

Quarter	1	2	3	4	Total
Seahawks	10	10	14	0	34
Broncos	0	10	21	6	37

at Mile High Stadium, Denver, Colorado

- Date: September 23
- Game time: 2:00 pm local
- Game weather: clear, 81 °F (27 °C), 16% humidity, wind SW 5 miles per hour (8.0 km/h)
- Game attendance: 74,879
- Referee: Gene Barth
- TV announcers (NBC): Marv Albert and Mike Haffner
- Gamebook

Game information

First quarter

- SEA – Efrén Herrera 28-yard field goal, 12:45 (SEA 3–0)
- SEA – Dan Doornink 5-yard run (Efrén Herrera kick), 0:33 (SEA 10–0)

Second quarter

- DEN – Jim Turner 27-yard field goal, 12:43 (SEA 10–3)
- SEA – Dan Doornink 5-yard run (Efrén Herrera kick), 8:09 (SEA 17–3)
- DEN – Otis Armstrong 2-yard run (Jim Turner kick), 7:34 (SEA 17–10)
- SEA – Efrén Herrera 22-yard field goal, 0:38 (SEA 20–10)

Third quarter

- SEA – Sam McCullum 13-yard pass from Jim Zorn (Efrén Herrera kick), 10:08 (SEA 27–10)
- SEA – Sherman Smith 1-yard run (Efrén Herrera kick), 9:28 (SEA 34–10)
- DEN – Dave Studdard 9-yard pass from Craig Morton (Jim Turner kick), 4:59 (SEA 34–17)
- DEN – Haven Moses 11-yard pass from Craig Morton (Jim Turner kick), 3:48 (SEA 34–24)
- DEN – Rick Upchurch 35-yard pass from Craig Morton (Jim Turner kick), 2:25 (SEA 34–31)

Fourth quarter

- DEN – Rob Lytle 2-yard run (PAT failed), 11:20 (DEN 37–34)

Top passers

- SEA – Jim Zorn: 16/32, 190 yds, 1 TD, 3 INT
- DEN – Craig Morton: 11/16, 178 yds, 3 TD

Top rushers

- SEA – Sherman Smith: 16 car, 81 yds, 1 TD
- DEN – Jim Jensen: 11 car, 39 yds

Top receivers

- SEA – Steve Largent: 6 rec, 110 yds
- DEN – Riley Odoms: 5 rec, 125 yds

Team – pass – rush – total – to

- SEA – 197 – 153 – 350 – 4
- DEN – 254 – 90 – 344 – 3

==== Week 5: vs. Kansas City Chiefs ====
Week Five: Seattle Seahawks vs. Kansas City Chiefs – Game summary

Quarter	1	2	3	4	Total
Chiefs	0	10	0	14	24
Seahawks	3	0	3	0	6

at Kingdome, Seattle

- Date: September 30
- Game time: 1:02 pm local
- Game weather: indoors
- Game attendance: 61,169
- Referee: Fred Wyant
- TV announcers (NBC): Jay Randolph and Paul Maguire
- Gamebook

Game information

First quarter

- SEA – Efrén Herrera 38-yard field goal, 12:29 (SEA 3–0)

Second quarter

- KC – Ted McKnight 23-yard run (Jan Stenerud kick), 13:49 (KC 7–3)
- KC – Jan Stenerud 36-yard field goal, 7:16 (KC 10–3)

Third quarter

- SEA – Efrén Herrera 20-yard field goal, 4:56 (KC 10–6)

Fourth quarter

- KC – Mike Williams 3-yard pass from Steve Fuller (Jan Stenerud kick), 9:03 (KC 17–6)
- KC – Ted McKnight 84-yard run (Jan Stenerud kick), 1:27 (KC 24–6)

Top passers

- KC – Steve Fuller: 8/12, 42 yds, 1 TD, 1 INT
- SEA – Jim Zorn: 23/38, 187 yds, 1 INT

Top rushers

- KC – Ted McKnight: 12 car, 147 yds, 2 TD
- SEA – Sherman Smith: 13 car, 53 yds

Top receivers

- KC – Ed Beckman: 1 rec, 12 yds
- SEA – Dan Doornink: 10 rec, 70 yds

Team – pass – rush – total – to

- KC – 15 – 215 – 230 – 1
- SEA – 178 – 134 – 312 – 2

==== Week 6: at San Francisco 49ers ====
Week Six: Seattle Seahawks at San Francisco 49ers – Game summary

Quarter	1	2	3	4	Total
Seahawks	14	7	7	7	35
49ers	7	3	0	14	24

at Candlestick Park, San Francisco

- Date: October 7
- Game time: 1:02 pm local
- Game weather: cloudy, 61 °F (16 °C), 77% humidity, wind variable
- Game attendance: 44,592
- Referee: Pat Haggerty
- TV announcers (NBC): Marv Albert and Mike Haffner
- Gamebook

Game information

First quarter

- SEA – Dan Doornink 13-yard run (Efrén Herrera kick), 11:08 (SEA 7–0)
- SF – O. J. Simpson 1-yard run (Ray Wersching kick), 7:37 (Tied 7–7)
- SEA – Dan Doornink 3-yard run (Efrén Herrera kick), 2:33 (SEA 14–7)

Second quarter

- SEA – Sherman Smith 7-yard run (Efrén Herrera kick), 2:46 (SEA 21–7)
- SF – Ray Wersching 25-yard field goal, 0:00 (SEA 21–10)

Third quarter

- SEA – Sammy Green 7-yard interception return (Efrén Herrera kick), 10:13 (SEA 28–10)

Fourth quarter

- SF – Lenvil Elliott 8-yard run (Ray Wersching kick), 8:54 (SEA 28–17)
- SEA – Jim Zorn 2-yard run (Efrén Herrera kick), 1:05 (SEA 35–17)
- SF – Ken MacAfee 1-yard pass from Steve DeBerg (Ray Wersching kick), 0:00 (SEA 35–24)

Top passers

- SEA – Jim Zorn: 13/20, 162 yds
- SF – Steve DeBerg: 31/40, 306 yds, 1 TD, 1 INT

Top rushers

- SEA – Dan Doornink: 19 car, 58 yds, 2 TD
- SF – O. J. Simpson: 15 car, 71 yds, 1 TD

Top receivers

- SEA – Steve Largent: 4 rec, 83 yds
- SF – Freddie Solomon: 6 rec, 81 yds

Team – pass – rush – total – to

- SEA – 162 – 148 – 310 – 0
- SF – 292 – 172 – 464 – 2

==== Week 7: at San Diego Chargers ====
Week Seven: Seattle Seahawks at San Diego Chargers – Game summary

Quarter	1	2	3	4	Total
Seahawks	0	3	0	7	10
Chargers	7	0	7	6	20

at San Diego Stadium, San Diego, California

- Date: October 14
- Game time: 1:01 pm local
- Game weather: clear, 72 °F (22 °C), 78% humidity, wind W 12 miles per hour (19 km/h)
- Game attendance: 50,077
- Referee: Chuck Heberling
- TV announcers (NBC): Merle Harmon and George Kunz
- Gamebook

Game information

First quarter

- SD – Lydell Mitchell 20-yard pass from Dan Fouts (Roy Gerela kick), 6:56 (SD 7–0)

Second quarter

- SEA – Efrén Herrera 19-yard field goal, 0:26 (SD 7–3)

Third quarter

- SD – John Jefferson 9-yard pass from Dan Fouts (Roy Gerela kick), 3:11 (SD 14–3)

Fourth quarter

- SEA – Sherman Smith 8-yard run (Efrén Herrera kick), 14:13 (SD 14–10)
- SD – John Jefferson 49-yard pass from Dan Fouts (PAT failed), 4:34 (SD 20–10)

Top passers

- SEA – Jim Zorn: 19/43, 192 yds, 1 INT
- SD – Dan Fouts: 28/35, 318 yds, 3 TD

Top rushers

- SEA – Sherman Smith: 13 car, 78 yds, 1 TD
- SD – Clarence Williams: 17 car, 45 yds

Top receivers

- SEA – Dan Doornink: 8 rec, 81 yds
- SD – John Jefferson: 9 rec, 137 yds, 2 TD

Team – pass – rush – total – to

- SEA – 147 – 133 – 280 – 1
- SD – 295 – 96 – 391 – 0

==== Week 8: vs. Houston Oilers ====
Week Eight: Seattle Seahawks vs. Houston Oilers – Game summary

Quarter	1	2	3	4	Total
Oilers	0	7	0	7	14
Seahawks	7	7	6	14	34

at Kingdome, Seattle

- Date: October 21
- Game time: 1:01 pm local
- Game weather: indoors
- Game attendance: 60,705
- Referee: Jerry Seeman
- TV announcers (NBC): Merle Harmon and George Kunz
- Gamebook

Game information

First quarter

- SEA – Sherman Smith 12-yard pass from Jim Zorn (Efrén Herrera kick), 8:12 (SEA 7–0)

Second quarter

- HOU – Mike Barber 9-yard pass from Dan Pastorini (Toni Fritsch kick), 10:26 (Tied 7–7)
- SEA – Steve Largent 45-yard pass from Jim Zorn (Efrén Herrera kick), 8:27 (SEA 14–7)

Third quarter

- SEA – Efrén Herrera 48-yard field goal, 9:24 (SEA 17–7)
- SEA – Efrén Herrera 30-yard field goal, 4:23 (SEA 20–7)

Fourth quarter

- SEA – Steve Largent 55-yard pass from Jim Zorn (Efrén Herrera kick), 14:50 (SEA 27–7)
- SEA – Cornell Webster 54-yard fumble return (Efrén Herrera kick), 12:58 (SEA 34–7)
- HOU – Ronnie Coleman 9-yard pass from Dan Pastorini (Toni Fritsch kick), 2:48 (SEA 34–14)

Top passers

- HOU – Dan Pastorini: 20/38, 195 yds, 2 TD, 1 INT
- SEA – Jim Zorn: 18/23, 252 yds, 3 TD, 1 INT

Top rushers

- HOU – Tim Wilson: 5 car, 31 yds
- SEA – Sherman Smith: 10 car, 49 yds

Top receivers

- HOU – Mike Barber: 7 rec, 81 yds, 1 TD
- SEA – Steve Largent: 6 rec, 135 yds, 2 TD

Team – pass – rush – total – to

- HOU – 160 – 83 – 243 – 3
- SEA – 240 – 151 – 391 – 2

==== Week 9: at Atlanta Falcons ====
Week Nine: Seattle Seahawks at Atlanta Falcons – Game summary

Quarter	1	2	3	4	Total
Seahawks	0	21	3	7	31
Falcons	7	7	0	14	28

at Atlanta–Fulton County Stadium, Atlanta

- Date: October 29
- Game time: 9:03 pm local
- Game weather: showers, 58 °F (14 °C), 84% humidity, wind E 10 miles per hour (16 km/h)
- Game attendance: 52,566
- Referee: Bob Frederic
- TV announcers (ABC): Frank Gifford, Fran Tarkenton, and Howard Cosell
- Gamebook

Game information

First quarter

- ATL – Lynn Cain 35-yard run (Tim Mazzetti kick), 9:51 (ATL 7–0)

Second quarter

- ATL – Rick Byas 30-yard fumble return (Tim Mazzetti kick), 14:17 (ATL 14–0)
- SEA – Jim Zorn 34-yard run (Efrén Herrera kick), 9:25 (ATL 14–7)
- SEA – Sherman Smith 4-yard pass from Jim Zorn (Efrén Herrera kick), 5:01 (Tied 14–14)
- SEA – Dan Doornink 8-yard run (Efrén Herrera kick), 1:54 (SEA 21–14)

Third quarter

- SEA – Efrén Herrera 24-yard field goal, 8:14 (SEA 24–14)

Fourth quarter

- ATL – Billy Ryckman 17-yard pass from Steve Bartkowski (Tim Mazzetti kick), 10:03 (SEA 24–21)
- SEA – Dan Doornink 26-yard run (Efrén Herrera kick), 1:54 (SEA 31–21)
- ATL – Billy Ryckman 20-yard pass from Steve Bartkowski (Tim Mazzetti kick), 0:51 (SEA 31–28)

Top passers

- SEA – Jim Zorn: 13/25, 197 yds, 1 TD
- ATL – Steve Bartkowski: 16/26, 186 yds, 2 TD, 2 INT

Top rushers

- SEA – Dan Doornink: 21 car, 122 yds, 2 TD
- ATL – Lynn Cain: 13 car, 99 yds, 1 TD

Top receivers

- SEA – Steve Largent: 6 rec, 127 yds
- ATL – Wallace Francis: 2 rec, 59 yds

Team – pass – rush – total – to

- SEA – 206 – 205 – 411 – 4
- ATL – 162 – 153 – 315 – 2

==== Week 10: vs. Los Angeles Rams ====
Week Ten: Seattle Seahawks vs. Los Angeles Rams – Game summary

Quarter	1	2	3	4	Total
Rams	14	7	3	0	24
Seahawks	0	0	0	0	0

at Kingdome, Seattle

- Date: November 4
- Game time: 1:03 pm local
- Game weather: indoors
- Game attendance: 62,048
- Referee: Pat Haggerty
- TV announcers (CBS): Vin Scully and George Allen
- Gamebook

Game information

First quarter

- LA – Wendell Tyler 3-yard run (Frank Corral kick), 7:27. Rams 7–0.
- LA – Charle Young 1-yard pass from Pat Haden (Frank Corral kick), 3:14. Rams 14–0.

Second quarter

- LA – Drew Hill 17-yard pass from Pat Haden (Frank Corral kick), 8:02. Rams 21–0.

Third quarter

- LA – Frank Corral 23-yard field goal, 1:12. Rams 24–0.

Fourth quarter

- No scoring plays

Top passers

- LA – Pat Haden – 17/21, 172 yards, 2 TD
- SEA – Jim Zorn – 2/17, 25 yards

Top rushers

- LA – Wendell Tyler – 18 rushes, 82 yards
- SEA – Sherman Smith – 7 rushes, 16 yards

Top receivers

- LA – Preston Dennard – 5 receptions, 93 yards
- SEA – Steve Largent – 2 receptions, 25 yards

With -7 total yards and just one first down, this is the fewest yards the Seahawks have ever gained in one match. It is the most recent – and only since 1970 – occasion when an NFL team has gained just one first down for an entire match, although the Denver Broncos did not gain a single first down in a 1966 game with the Houston Oilers.

==== Week 11: at Cleveland Browns ====
Week Eleven: Seattle Seahawks at Cleveland Browns – Game summary

Quarter	1	2	3	4	Total
Seahawks	7	9	0	13	29
Browns	0	3	14	7	24

at Cleveland Stadium, Cleveland, Ohio

- Date: November 11
- Game time: 1:00 pm local
- Game weather: overcast, 35 °F (2 °C), 64% humidity, wind NW 12 miles per hour (19 km/h)
- Game attendance: 72,440
- Referee: Fred Silva
- TV announcers (NBC): Merle Harmon and George Kunz
- Gamebook

Game information

First quarter

- SEA – Sherman Smith 5-yard run (Efrén Herrera kick), 7:39 (SEA 7–0)

Second quarter

- SEA – Sherman Smith 2-yard run (PAT failed), 13:57 (SEA 13–0)
- SEA – Efrén Herrera 34-yard field goal, 9:07 (SEA 16–0)
- CLE – Don Cockroft 28-yard field goal, 4:14 (SEA 16–3)

Third quarter

- CLE – Mike Pruitt 65-yard run (Don Cockroft kick), 14:38 (SEA 16–10)
- CLE – Mike Pruitt 1-yard run (Don Cockroft kick), 4:28 (CLE 17–10)

Fourth quarter

- SEA – Al Hunter 5-yard run (PAT failed), 14:32 (SEA 22–17)
- SEA – Sherman Smith 2-yard run (Efrén Herrera kick), 9:29 (SEA 29–17)
- CLE – Brian Sipe 3-yard run (Don Cockroft kick), 7:41 (SEA 29–24)

Top passers

- SEA – Jim Zorn: 15/27, 249 yds
- CLE – Brian Sipe: 13/29, 177 yds, 2 INT

Top rushers

- SEA – Al Hunter: 13 car, 95 yds, 1 TD
- CLE – Mike Pruitt: 15 car, 141 yds, 2 TD

Top receivers

- SEA – Steve Largent: 3 rec, 93 yds
- CLE – Ozzie Newsome: 3 rec, 61 yds

Team – pass – rush – total – to

- SEA – 238 – 189 – 427 – 1
- CLE – 158 – 215 – 373 – 3

==== Week 12: vs. New Orleans Saints ====
Week Twelve: Seattle Seahawks vs. New Orleans Saints – Game summary

Quarter	1	2	3	4	Total
Saints	7	7	3	7	24
Seahawks	7	17	0	14	38

at Kingdome, Seattle

- Date: November 18
- Game time: 1:01 pm local
- Game weather: indoors
- Game attendance: 60,055
- Referee: Dick Jorgensen
- TV announcers (CBS): Vin Scully and George Allen
- Gamebook

Game information

First quarter

- NO – Archie Manning 4-yard run (Garo Yepremian kick), 10:13 (NO 7–0)
- SEA – Sam McCullum 51-yard pass from Jim Zorn (Efrén Herrera kick), 13:57 (Tied 7–7)

Second quarter

- SEA – Efrén Herrera 27-yard field goal, 14:57 (SEA 10–7)
- SEA – Steve Largent 39-yard pass from Jim Zorn (Efrén Herrera kick), 14:18 (SEA 17–7)
- NO – Wes Chandler 4-yard pass from Archie Manning (Garo Yepremian kick), 9:58 (SEA 17–14)
- SEA – Dan Doornink 2-yard run (Efrén Herrera kick), 5:24 (SEA 24–14)

Third quarter

- NO – Garo Yepremian 40-yard field goal, 9:57 (SEA 24–17)

Fourth quarter

- NO – Chuck Muncie 1-yard run (Garo Yepremian kick), 8:25 (Tied 24–24)
- SEA – Steve Largent 35-yard pass from Jim Zorn (Efrén Herrera kick), 6:16 (SEA 31–24)
- SEA – Brian Peets 5-yard pass from Jim Zorn (Efrén Herrera kick), 1:06 (SEA 38–24)

Top passers

- NO – Archie Manning: 20/27, 268 yds, 1 TD
- SEA – Jim Zorn: 24/33, 268 yds, 1 TD

Top rushers

- NO – Chuck Muncie: 14 car, 72 yds, 1 TD
- SEA – Jeff Moore: 15 car, 65 yds

Top receivers

- NO – Henry Childs: 6 rec, 121 yds
- SEA – Steve Largent: 9 rec, 146 yds, 2 TD

Team – pass – rush – total – to

- NO – 286 – 134 – 420 – 1
- SEA – 391 – 130 – 521 – 1

==== Week 13: vs. New York Jets ====
Week Thirteen: Seattle Seahawks vs. New York Jets – Game summary

Quarter	1	2	3	4	Total
Jets	0	0	7	0	7
Seahawks	3	13	14	0	30

at Kingdome, Seattle

- Date: November 26
- Game time: 6:05 pm local
- Game weather: indoors
- Game attendance: 59,977
- Referee: Jim Tunney
- TV announcers (ABC): Frank Gifford, Howard Cosell and Fran Tarkenton
- Gamebook

Game information

First quarter

- SEA – Efrén Herrera 49-yard field goal, 2:51 (SEA 3–0)

Second quarter

- SEA – Efrén Herrera 42-yard field goal, 8:25 (SEA 6–0)
- SEA – Steve Largent 14-yard pass from Jim Zorn (Efrén Herrera kick), 6:03 (SEA 13–0)
- SEA – Efrén Herrera 45-yard field goal, 0:00 (SEA 16–0)

Third quarter

- SEA – Sherman Smith 16-yard pass from Jim Zorn (Efrén Herrera kick), 10:20 (SEA 23–0)
- NYJ – Kevin Long 5-yard run (Dave Jacobs kick), 6:49 (SEA 23–7)
- SEA – Sam McCullum 11-yard pass from Jim Zorn (Efrén Herrera kick), 1:58 (SEA 30–7)

Fourth quarter

- No scoring plays

Top passers

- NYJ – Richard Todd: 19/36, 226 yds
- SEA – Jim Zorn: 25/32, 285 yds, 3 TD

Top rushers

- NYJ – Clark Gaines: 17 car, 71 yds
- SEA – Sherman Smith: 14 car, 33 yds

Top receivers

- NYJ – Jerome Barkum: 6 rec, 103 yds
- SEA – Sherman Smith: 8 rec, 86 yds, 1 TD

Team – pass – rush – total – to

- NYJ – 226 – 139 – 365 – 2
- SEA – 313 – 86 – 399 – 1

==== Week 14: at Kansas City Chiefs ====
Week Fourteen: Seattle Seahawks at Kansas City Chiefs – Game summary

Quarter	1	2	3	4	Total
Seahawks	0	0	7	14	21
Chiefs	14	10	6	7	37

at Arrowhead Stadium, Kansas City, Missouri

- Date: December 2
- Game time: 1:05 pm local
- Game weather: clear, 32 °F (0 °C), 40% humidity, wind S 10 miles per hour (16 km/h)
- Game attendance: 42,160
- Referee: Red Cashion
- TV announcers (NBC): Jay Randolph and Paul Maguire
- Gamebook

Game information

First quarter

- KC – J.T. Smith 28-yard pass from Steve Fuller (Jan Stenerud kick), 7:05 (KC 7–0)
- KC – Ted McKnight 5-yard run (Jan Stenerud kick), 5:43 (KC 14–0)

Second quarter

- KC – Earl Gant 2-yard run (Jan Stenerud kick), 14:57 (KC 21–0)
- KC – Jan Stenerud 27-yard field goal, 0:18 (KC 24–0)

Third quarter

- KC – Jan Stenerud 31-yard field goal, 11:29 (KC 27–0)
- SEA – Jeff Moore 1-yard run (Efrén Herrera kick), 10:11 (KC 27–7)
- KC – Jan Stenerud 22-yard field goal, 2:41 (KC 30–7)

Fourth quarter

- KC – Ted McKnight 3-yard run (Jan Stenerud kick), 13:18 (KC 37–7)
- SEA – Dan Doornink 1-yard run (Efrén Herrera kick), 10:12 (KC 37–14)
- SEA – Jeff Moore 12-yard run (Efrén Herrera kick), 2:10 (KC 37–21)

Top passers

- SEA – Jim Zorn: 22/45, 239 yds, 3 INT
- KC – Steve Fuller: 10/23, 137 yds, 1 TD

Top rushers

- SEA – Jim Zorn: 2 car, 21 yds
- KC – Earl Gant: 21 car, 67 yds, 1 TD

Top receivers

- SEA – Steve Largent: 9 rec, 120 yds
- KC – J.T. Smith: 4 rec, 60 yds, 1 TD

Team – pass – rush – total – to

- SEA – 231 – 44 – 275 – 5
- KAN – 137 – 194 – 331 – 2

==== Week 15: vs. Denver Broncos ====
Week Fifteen: Seattle Seahawks vs. Denver Broncos – Game summary

Quarter	1	2	3	4	Total
Broncos	0	20	3	0	23
Seahawks	7	7	7	7	28

at Kingdome, Seattle

- Date: December 8
- Game time: 1:02 pm local
- Game weather: indoors
- Game attendance: 60,038
- Referee: Cal Lepore
- TV announcers (NBC): Dick Enberg and Merlin Olsen
- Gamebook

Game information

First quarter

- SEA – Sherman Smith 17-yard run (Efrén Herrera kick), 4:32 (SEA 7–0)

Second quarter

- SEA – Sherman Smith 1-yard run (Efrén Herrera kick), 13:05 (SEA 14–0)
- DEN – Craig Morton 2-yard run (Jim Turner kick), 11:46 (SEA 14–7)
- DEN – Haven Moses 7-yard pass from Craig Morton (PAT failed), 5:06 (SEA 14–13)
- DEN – Jim Jensen 2-yard run (Jim Turner kick), 0:40 (DEN 20–14)

Third quarter

- SEA – Steve Largent 35-yard pass from Jim Zorn (Efrén Herrera kick), 10:22 (SEA 21–20)
- DEN – Jim Turner 29-yard field goal, 7:01 (DEN 23–21)

Fourth quarter

- SEA – Steve Largent 43-yard pass from Jim Zorn (Efrén Herrera kick), 1:40 (SEA 28–23)

Top passers

- DEN – Craig Morton: 22/40, 245 yds, 1 TD, 2 INT
- SEA – Jim Zorn: 22/39, 308 yds, 2 TD, 2 INT

Top rushers

- DEN – Jim Jensen: 13 car, 37 yds, 1 TD
- SEA – Sherman Smith: 14 car, 57 yds, 2 TD

Top receivers

- DEN – Rick Upchurch: 7 rec, 91 yds
- SEA – Sam McCullum: 5 rec, 102 yds

Team – pass – rush – total – to

- DEN – 222 – 141 – 363 – 3
- SEA – 308 – 74 – 382 – 2

==== Week 16: at Oakland Raiders ====
Week Sixteen: Seattle Seahawks at Oakland Raiders – Game summary

Quarter	1	2	3	4	Total
Seahawks	10	7	9	3	29
Raiders	7	10	0	7	24

at Oakland–Alameda County Coliseum, Oakland, California

- Date: December 16
- Game time: 1:01 pm local
- Game weather: clear, 56 °F (13 °C), 61% humidity, wind SW 6 miles per hour (9.7 km/h)
- Game attendance: 53,177
- Referee: Jerry Markbreit
- TV announcers (NBC): Merle Harmon and George Kunz
- Gamebook

Game information

First quarter

- OAK – Lester Hayes 30-yard interception return (Jim Breech kick), 14:08 (OAK 7–0)
- SEA – Sherman Smith 1-yard run (Efrén Herrera kick), 10:18 (Tied 7–7)
- SEA – Efrén Herrera 24-yard field goal, 5:15 (SEA 10–7)

Second quarter

- OAK – Jim Breech 20-yard field goal, 14:03 (Tied 10–10)
- SEA – Sam McCullum 65-yard pass from Jim Zorn (Efrén Herrera kick), 13:45 (SEA 17–10)
- OAK – Arthur Whittington 2-yard run (Jim Breech kick), 6:07 (Tied 17–17)

Third quarter

- SEA – Dan Doornink 17-yard pass from Jim Zorn (Efrén Herrera kick), 8:55 (SEA 24–17)
- SEA – Safety, ball snapped out of end zone, 7:25 (SEA 26–17)

Fourth quarter

- SEA – Efrén Herrera 43-yard field goal, 5:27 (SEA 29–17)
- OAK – Mark van Eeghen 2-yard pass from Ken Stabler (Jim Breech kick), 1:18 (SEA 29–24)

Top passers

- SEA – Jim Zorn: 23/35, 314 yds, 2 TD, 1 INT
- OAK – Ken Stabler: 31/47, 342 yds, 1 TD, 2 INT

Top rushers

- SEA – Sherman Smith: 15 car, 44 yds, 1 TD
- OAK – Mark van Eeghen: 11 car, 38 yds

Top receivers

- SEA – Sam McCullum: 8 rec, 173 yds, 1 TD
- OAK – Cliff Branch: 10 rec, 109 yds

Team – pass – rush – total – to

- SEA – 314 – 94 – 408 – 2
- OAK – 336 – 82 – 418 – 3

== Awards and records ==
- Steve Largent, NFL Leader in Receiving Yards, (1,237)
