= List of Boise State Broncos in the NFL draft =

This is a list of Boise State Broncos football players in the NFL draft.

== Key ==
B	Back	K	Kicker	NT	Nose tackle
C	Center	LB	Linebacker	FB	Fullback
DB	Defensive back	P	Punter	HB	Halfback
DE	Defensive end	QB	Quarterback	WR	Wide receiver
DT	Defensive tackle	RB	Running back	G	Guard
DE	End	T	Offensive tackle	TE	Tight end

== Selections ==
Year	Round	Pick	Player	Team	Position
1970	7	180	Steve Svitak	Oakland Raiders	LB
1971	10	241	Faddie Tillman	Atlanta Falcons	DE
1972	9	209	Steve Vogel	Buffalo Bills	LB
1972	14	356	Eric Guthrie	San Francisco 49ers	QB
1973	10	244	Al Marshall	Denver Broncos	WR
1974	9	213	Don Hutt	Los Angeles Rams	WR
1974	13	313	Dan Dixon	Houston Oilers	G
1974	17	433	Al Davis	Atlanta Falcons	G
1975	6	148	Roland Woolsey	Dallas Cowboys	DB
1975	14	350	Jim McMillan	Detroit Lions	QB
1975	15	386	Ron Franklin	St. Louis Cardinals	DT
1976	3	75	John Smith	Dallas Cowboys	RB
1976	16	448	Gary Gorrell	Buffalo Bills	LB
1976	17	475	Jim Meeks	Detroit Lions	DB
1979	7	169	Larry Polowski	Seattle Seahawks	LB
1979	8	205	Willie Beamon	New York Jets	LB
1981	2	31	David Hughes	Seattle Seahawks	RB
1982	4	97	Rick Woods	Pittsburgh Steelers	DB
1982	9	238	Randy Trautman	Washington Redskins	DT
1983	7	183	Jeff Turk	Atlanta Falcons	DB
1983	8	215	John Rade	Atlanta Falcons	LB
1984	11	291	Michel Bourgeau	New Orleans Saints	DE
1986	2	30	Markus Koch	Washington Redskins	DE
1986	7	184	Jon Francis	New York Giants	RB
1987	6	155	Lance Sellers	Miami Dolphins	LB
1987	10	273	Jim Ellis	Los Angeles Raiders	LB
1992	5	137	Frank Robinson	Denver Broncos	DB
1992	9	234	Larry Stayner	Seattle Seahawks	TE
1994	6	162	Kimo von Oelhoffen	Cincinnati Bengals	DT
2000	5	141	Dave Stachelski	New England Patriots	TE
2001	7	212	Shaunard Harts	Kansas City Chiefs	DB
2002	5	171	Matt Hill	Seattle Seahawks	T
2002	6	191	Jeb Putzier	Denver Broncos	TE
2003	6	206	Brock Forsey	Chicago Bears	RB
2006	2	47	Daryn Colledge	Green Bay Packers	T
2007	2	61	Gerald Alexander	Detroit Lions	DB
2007	5	172	Legedu Naanee	San Diego Chargers	WR
2007	6	191	Korey Hall	Green Bay Packers	LB
2007	7	222	Derek Schouman	Buffalo Bills	TE
2008	1	12	Ryan Clady	Denver Broncos	T
2008	5	143	Orlando Scandrick	Dallas Cowboys	DB
2010	1	29	Kyle Wilson	New York Jets	DB
2011	2	44	Titus Young	Detroit Lions	WR
2011	3	78	Austin Pettis	St. Louis Rams	WR
2011	7	213	Brandyn Thompson	Washington Redskins	DB
2012	1	19	Shea McClellin	Chicago Bears	DE
2012	1	31	Doug Martin	Tampa Bay Buccaneers	RB
2012	3	81	Tyrone Crawford	Dallas Cowboys	DE
2012	5	167	George Iloka	Cincinnati Bengals	DB
2012	6	205	Billy Winn	Cleveland Browns	DT
2012	7	221	Nate Potter	Arizona Cardinals	T
2013	2	54	Jamar Taylor	Miami Dolphins	DB
2014	2	34	DeMarcus Lawrence	Dallas Cowboys	DE
2014	6	207	Matt Paradis	Denver Broncos	C
2014	7	246	Charles Leno	Chicago Bears	T
2015	5	149	Jay Ajayi	Miami Dolphins	RB
2016	2	42	Kamalei Correa	Baltimore Ravens	LB
2016	3	71	Darian Thompson	New York Giants	DB
2016	3	97	Rees Odhiambo	Seattle Seahawks	T
2017	5	162	Jeremy McNichols	Tampa Bay Buccaneers	RB
2017	6	195	Tanner Vallejo	Buffalo Bills	LB
2018	1	19	Leighton Vander Esch	Dallas Cowboys	LB
2018	6	208	Cedrick Wilson Jr.	Dallas Cowboys	WR
2019	3	102	Alexander Mattison	Minnesota Vikings	RB
2020	2	58	Ezra Cleveland	Minnesota Vikings	T
2020	5	164	Curtis Weaver	Miami Dolphins	DE
2020	5	168	John Hightower	Philadelphia Eagles	WR
2021	4	124	John Bates	Washington Football Team	TE
2021	5	183	Avery Williams	Atlanta Falcons	DB
2022	5	148	Khalil Shakir	Buffalo Bills	WR
2023	6	183	JL Skinner	Denver Broncos	DB
2023	6	200	Scott Matlock	Los Angeles Chargers	DT
2025	1	6	Ashton Jeanty	Las Vegas Raiders	RB
2025	6	196	Ahmed Hassanein	Detroit Lions	DE
2026	4	111	Kage Casey	Denver Broncos	T
