= John Born =

American parlor magician

John B Born
- Website: http://www.magician-newyorkcity.com/

John B. Born is an American parlor magician, winner of multiple awards including "Close-Up Magician of the Year" from the International Brotherhood of Magicians in 2006, author of four books, appeared on instructional DVDs created in Las Vegas and Reno, and a frequent lecturer on the subject of magic techniques.

== Biography ==
John is from Wichita, Kansas, and learned the craft of the magician from his grandfather who had studied magic and mentalism for 35 years. While a basketball player in high school in Wichita, he was sidelined with a broken foot and couldn't play. His grandfather then brought him his own videotapes and books about magic techniques, and Born began working on his craft, becoming an expert in close-up magic. He graduated from Kapaun Mt. Carmel Catholic High School in 1999. When he went on to college, he studied international business at Rockhurst University, then transferring to Wichita State University, after which he worked for five years as a resident magician at "Steven's Magic Emporium" in Wichita, followed by one year at U.S. Toy Magic in Kansas City. He has also performed in Las Vegas at Caesar's Magical Empire.

== Awards ==
- Winner, 2006 Magi-Fest Close-Up Competition, Columbus, Ohio
- 1st place, 2006 IBM Gold Cups
- 1st place, Closeup Magic, Midwest Magic Jubilee

== Works ==
=== Books ===
- "Seeking the Bridge: Further Principles and Techniques for the Sophisticated Magic Artiste" (2012)
- Cheating at Texas Hold'em: A Modern Guide to the Art of Deception and Illicit Play at the Card Table (2010)
- Meant to Be: Principles and Techniques for the Sophisticated Magical Artiste (2006)
- Matrix God's Way: Coin Technique for the Next Generation (2003)

=== DVDs ===
- J-Team (with Jason Dean)
- Steven's Magic's Coin Classics
