= Blake Bell =

American football player (born 1991)

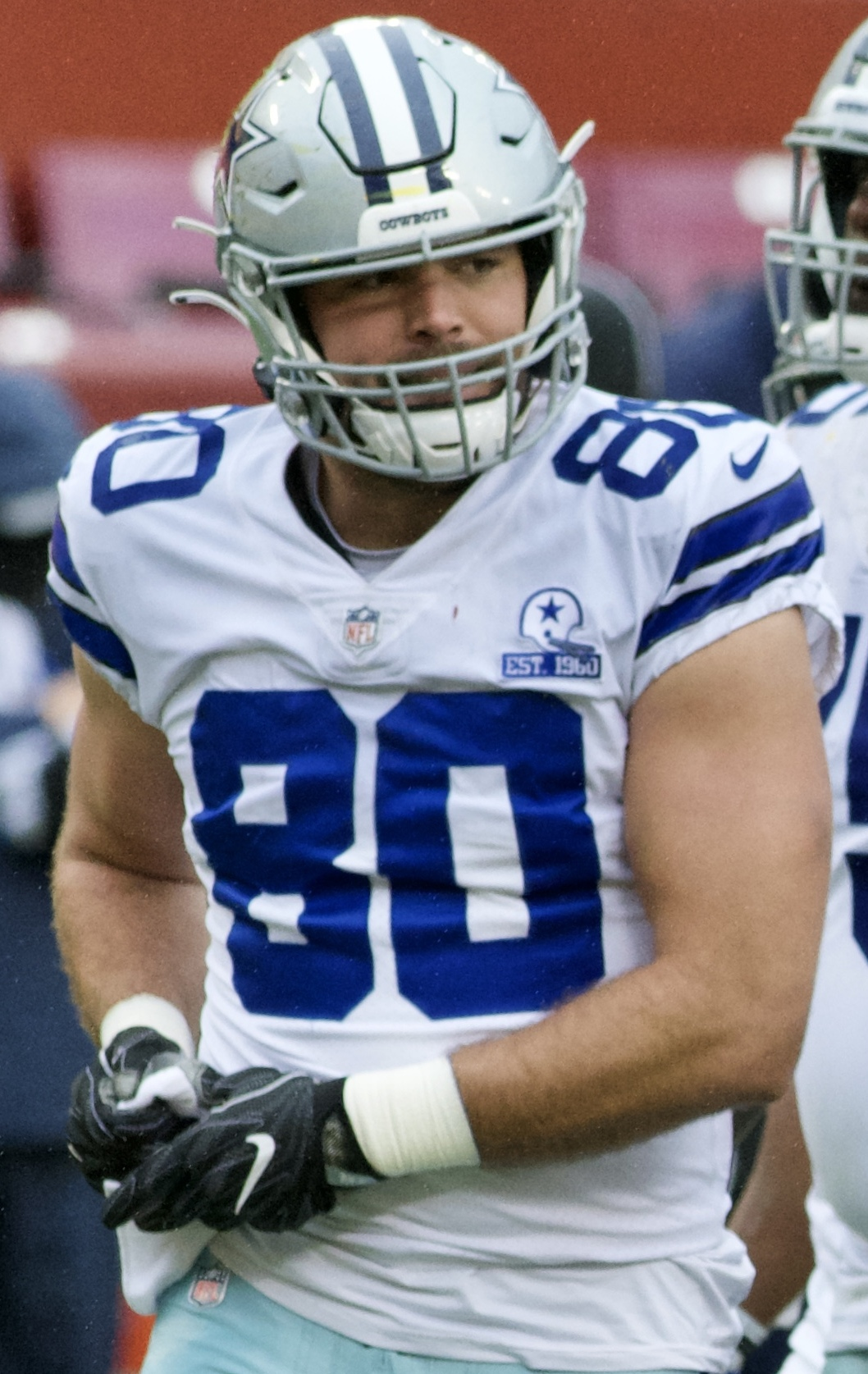
- Bell with the Dallas Cowboys in 2020

No. 84, 81, 87, 80
- Position: Tight end

Personal information
- Born: August 7, 1991 (age 35); Wichita, Kansas, U.S.
- Listed height: 6 ft 6 in (1.98 m)
- Listed weight: 252 lb (114 kg)

Career information
- High school: Bishop Carroll (Wichita)
- College: Oklahoma (2010–2014)
- NFL draft: 2015: 4th round, 117th overall pick

Career history
- San Francisco 49ers (2015–2016); Minnesota Vikings (2017); Jacksonville Jaguars (2018); Kansas City Chiefs (2019); Dallas Cowboys (2020); Kansas City Chiefs (2021–2023)

Awards and highlights
- 3× Super Bowl champion (LIV, LVII, LVIII)

Career NFL statistics
- Receptions: 65
- Receiving yards: 667
- Receiving touchdowns: 2
- Rushing yards: 12
- Stats at Pro Football Reference

Blake Bell (born August 7, 1991) is an American former professional football player who was a tight end in the National Football League (NFL). He was selected by the San Francisco 49ers in the fourth round of the 2015 NFL draft. He played college football for the Oklahoma Sooners, where he received the nickname "Belldozer", a play on words due to his large frame, running style, and blocking ability.

== Early life ==
Bell attended Bishop Carroll Catholic High School in Wichita, Kansas, where he played as a quarterback. As a senior in 2009, he threw for 2,752 yards with 32 touchdowns. He was ranked as the sixth best pro-style quarterback recruit by Rivals.com.

He was selected by the Detroit Tigers in the 43rd round of the 2010 Major League Baseball draft, but did not sign with the team.

== College career ==
Bell accepted a football scholarship from the University of Oklahoma and was redshirted in 2010. In 2011, he was the backup quarterback to Landry Jones, but appeared in the Sooners jumbo package, leading to 44 rushing attempts for 171 yards and 13 touchdowns. As a passer, he completed one of four passes for eight yards and an interception. He was the MVP of the 2011 Insight Bowl after rushing for 51 yards on 10 carries with three touchdowns.

As a sophomore in 2012, he was again the backup to Jones and was used mostly in the jumbo package. He rushed for 201 yards on 60 attempts with 11 touchdowns and completed 9-of-16 passes for 107 yards.

As a junior in 2013, he appeared in 11 games out of 13 games (8 starts), missing the contest at Kansas State University and the 2014 Sugar Bowl. He made 140 completions out of 233 attempts for 1,648 yards, 12 touchdowns and 5 interceptions.

As a senior in the spring of 2014, Bell was converted into a tight end after the emergence of redshirt freshman quarterback Trevor Knight in the 2014 Sugar Bowl. He appeared in 9 games and was used mostly for blocking purposes, posting 16 receptions for 214 yards and 4 touchdowns.

== Professional career ==
=== Pre-draft ===
Bell was projected to be a fifth round draft pick. He was ranked the ninth best tight end prospect in the draft by NFLDraftScout.com.

Pre-draft measurables
Height	Weight	Arm length	Hand span	Wingspan	40-yard dash	10-yard split	20-yard split	20-yard shuttle	Three-cone drill	Vertical jump	Broad jump	Bench press
6 ft 6 1/4 in (1.99 m)	252 lb (114 kg)	33 1/8 in (0.84 m)	10 in (0.25 m)	6 ft 7 5/8 in (2.02 m)	4.80 s	1.73 s	2.85 s	4.32 s	6.85 s	33 in (0.84 m)	9 ft 8 in (2.95 m)	18 reps
All values from NFL Combine/Pro Day

=== San Francisco 49ers ===
==== 2015 ====
Bell was selected by the San Francisco 49ers in the fourth round (117th overall) of the 2015 NFL draft. He was the fifth tight end chosen in 2015. On May 11, 2015, the 49ers signed him to a four-year, $2.78 million contract that includes a signing bonus of $505,132.

Throughout training camp, Bell faced stiff competition for a roster spot against Vance McDonald, Garrett Celek, Xavier Grimble, Derek Carrier, Asante Cleveland, and Rory Anderson. Head coach Jim Tomsula named him the fourth tight end on the depth chart to begin his rookie season, behind Vernon Davis, Vance McDonald, and Garrett Celek.

He made his professional regular season debut in the 49ers' season-opening 20–3 victory over the Minnesota Vikings. The following week, he made his first career reception off a four-yard pass by quarterback Colin Kaepernick during the third quarter of a 43–18 loss to the Pittsburgh Steelers.

On October 11, 2015, he earned his first career start after Davis was inactive due to a knee injury. Bell finished the 30–27 loss at the New York Giants with one reception for six yards. He was a healthy scratch in Weeks 7–8. On November 29, 2015, Bell caught three passes for a season-high 67 yards during a 19–13 loss to the Arizona Cardinals. He saw increased snaps in the Cardinals game after Garrett Celek left the game due to an ankle injury.

The next week, he had a season-high four receptions for 43 yards during a 24–14 loss to the Cincinnati Bengals. He finished his only season under offensive coordinator Geep Chryst with a total of 15 receptions for 186 receiving yards.

==== 2016 ====
Bell competed to maintain a roster spot under new head coach Chip Kelly, competing against Garrett Celek, Bruce Miller, Rory Anderson, and Je'Ron Hamm. He was named the second tight end on the 49ers' depth chart behind Vance McDonald.

On December 18, 2016, Bell caught one reception for a season-high 45 yards during a 41–13 loss at the Atlanta Falcons. Unfortunately, he left the first half of the game after suffering a shoulder injury and was placed on injured reserve the following day. He finished the 2016 season with only four receptions for 85 receiving yards in 13 games.

==== 2017 ====
Bell contended for a roster spot under new head coach Kyle Shanahan, going up against George Kittle, Logan Paulsen, and Cole Hikutini. On September 2, 2017, the San Francisco 49ers waived Bell.

=== Minnesota Vikings ===
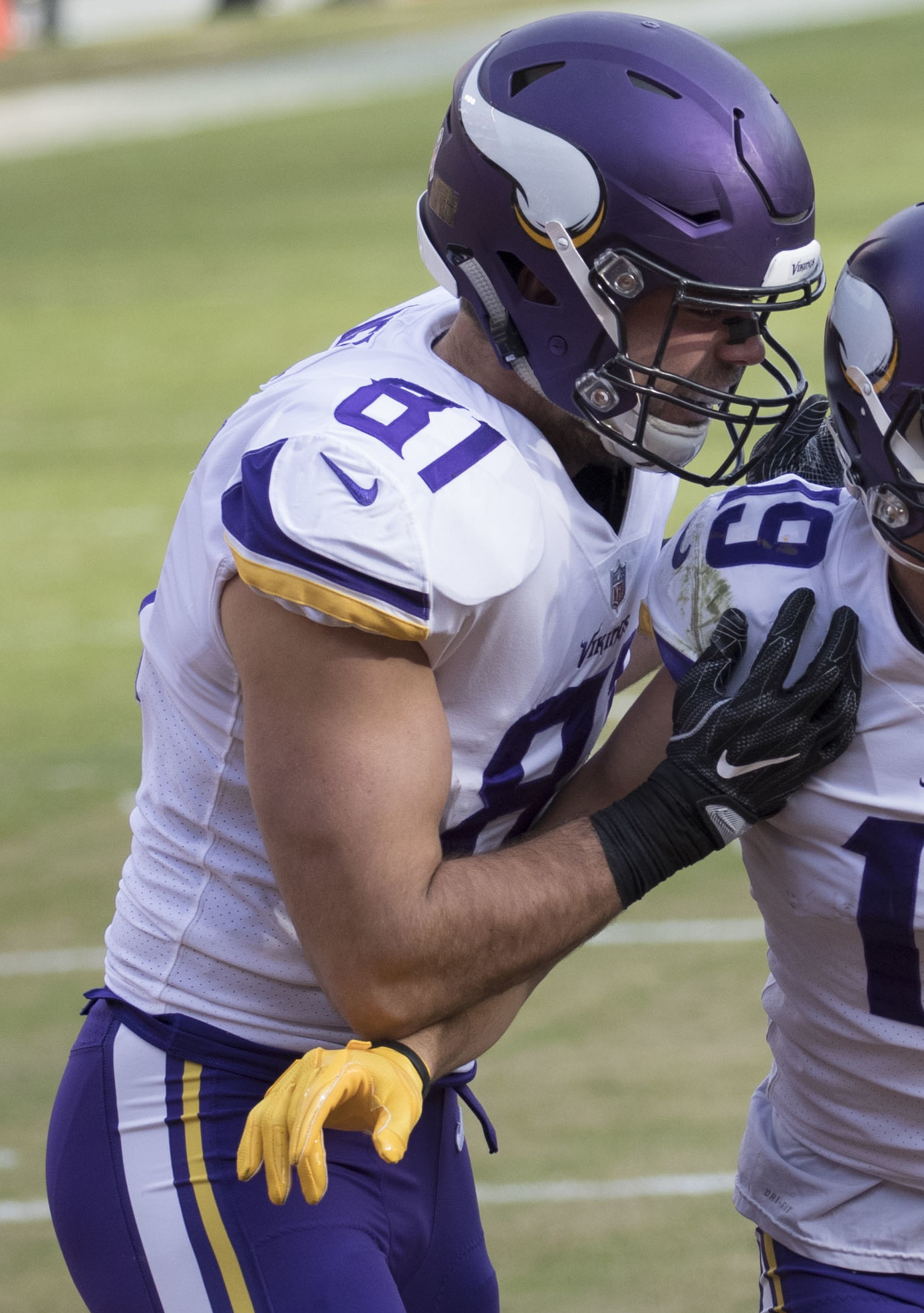
Bell with the Minnesota Vikings in 2017

On September 3, 2017, Bell was claimed off waivers by the Vikings. He began the season as the third tight end on the roster, behind Kyle Rudolph and David Morgan II.

Bell made his Vikings' debut in their season-opening 29–19 victory over the New Orleans Saints. On October 1, 2017, he earned his first start with the Vikings and caught a 12-yard pass from quarterback Case Keenum during Minnesota's 14–7 loss to the Detroit Lions.

On December 10, 2017, Bell scored his first NFL points, catching a two-point conversion during a 31–24 loss against the Carolina Panthers. On December 15, 2017, the Minnesota Vikings placed Bell on injured/reserve after he suffered a shoulder injury.

On September 1, 2018, Bell was waived by the Vikings.

=== Jacksonville Jaguars ===
On October 16, 2018, he signed with the Jacksonville Jaguars. He appeared in 10 games (4 starts), tallying 8 receptions for 67 yards.

=== Kansas City Chiefs (first stint) ===
On April 2, 2019, Bell signed with the Kansas City Chiefs. Bell scored his first NFL touchdown on January 12, 2020, with an eight-yard touchdown reception in the fourth quarter of Kansas City's AFC Divisional Playoff win over the Houston Texans. The Chiefs advanced to Super Bowl LIV where they defeated Bell's former team the 49ers 31–20. Bell caught one pass for nine yards in the Super Bowl.

=== Dallas Cowboys ===
On April 7, 2020, Bell was signed as a free agent by the Dallas Cowboys, to take over the blocking tight end role that Jason Witten had the previous season. After starter Blake Jarwin was lost for the year with an ACL injury suffered in the season opener against the Los Angeles Rams, Bell became the backup tight end behind Dalton Schultz. He appeared in 16 games, making 11 receptions for 110 yards and no touchdowns. He started the seventh and eighth game, when the Cowboys employed a two tight end formation to provide extra passing protection.

=== Kansas City Chiefs (second stint) ===
On March 18, 2021, Bell signed with the Chiefs. He was put on the Reserve/COVID-19 list on December 21, 2021. He was activated off the Reserve/COVID-19 list on December 24, 2021.

Bell re-signed with the Chiefs on March 24, 2022, to a one-year deal. Bell was placed on injured reserve on September 5, 2022. He was activated on December 23.

In the 2022 season, Bell recorded his first career receiving touchdown in the regular season in the Chiefs' Week 17 game against the Denver Broncos. Bell won his second Super Bowl when the Chiefs defeated the Eagles 38–35 in Super Bowl LVII.

In the 2023 season, Bell won his third Super Bowl championship when the Chiefs defeated the 49ers 25–22 in Super Bowl LVIII.

== Personal life ==
Bell is the son of former NFL defensive end Mark Bell and nephew of former defensive end Mike Bell. Bell is a devout Roman Catholic.
