= Robert Hardy (disambiguation) =

Robert Hardy (1925–2017) was an English actor.

Robert Hardy may also refer to:

- Robert Hardy (American football) (born 1956), American football player
- Robert Hardy (bassist) (born 1980), member of Glasgow-based band Franz Ferdinand
- Robert Hardy (bishop) (1936-2021), Anglican bishop
- Robert Gathorne-Hardy (1902–1973), bibliographer, botanist and writer on plants
- Rob Hardy (born 1971), American film director
