= Jesse Taylor (disambiguation) =

Jesse Taylor (born 1983) is an American mixed martial arts fighter.

Jesse Taylor may also refer to:

- Jesse Taylor (American football) (1948–2023), American football player
- Jesse J. Taylor (1925–1965), United States Navy naval aviator
