= USS Taylor (FFG-50) =

1983 Oliver Hazard Perry-class frigate

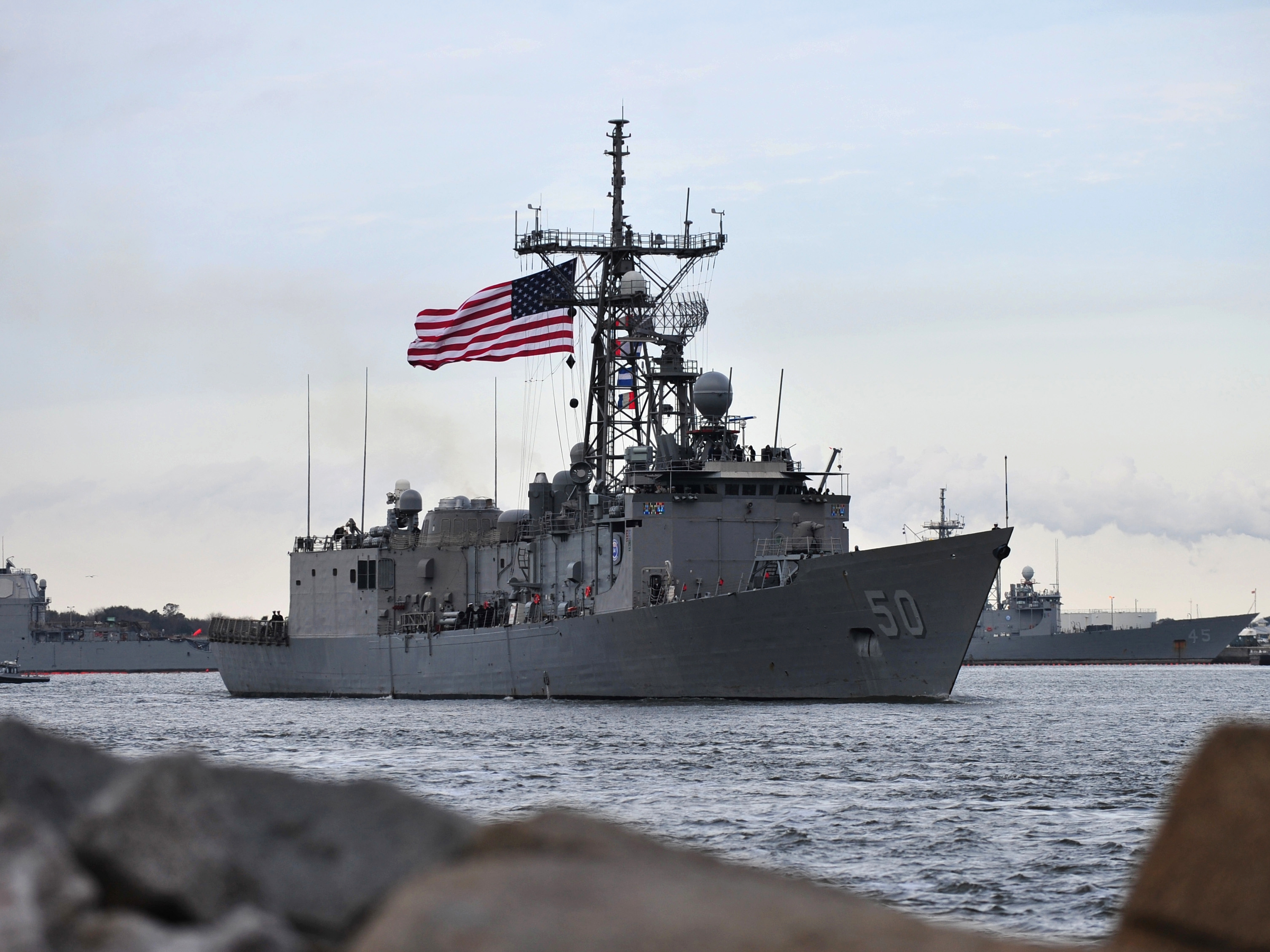
- USS Taylor (FFG-50) leaving Mayport in January 2014

History

United States
- Name: Taylor
- Namesake: Commander Jesse J. Taylor
- Awarded: May 22, 1981
- Builder: Bath Iron Works, Bath, Maine
- Laid down: May 5, 1983
- Launched: November 5, 1983
- Sponsored by: Barbara A. Taylor, widow of namesake
- Commissioned: December 1, 1984
- Decommissioned: May 8, 2015
- Identification: Hull symbol: FFG-50; MMSI number: 338975000; Code letters: NJJT
- Motto: "Proud Defender"
- Fate: Slated for sale to Taiwan by the Naval Vessel Transfer Act of 2013
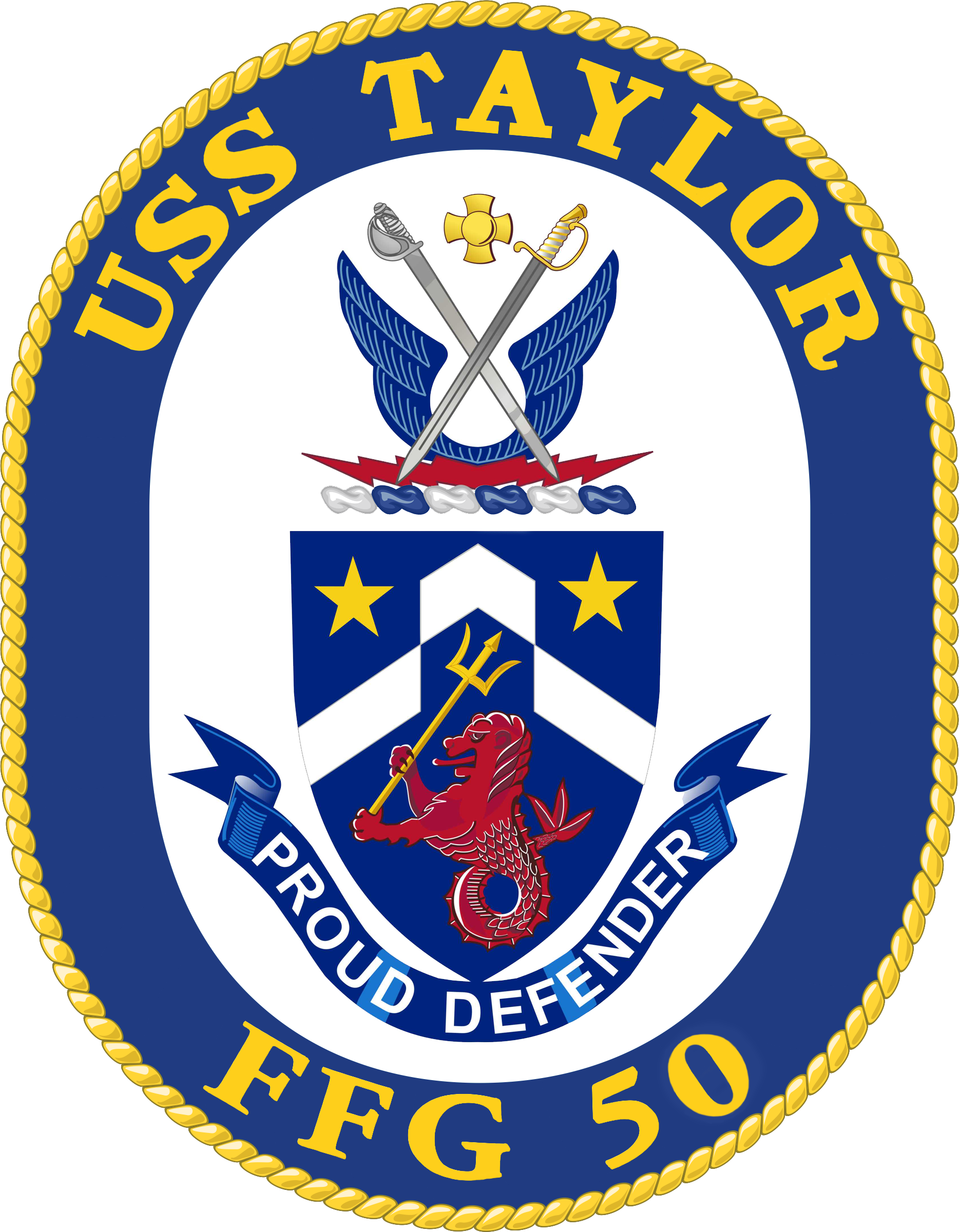
- Badge

Republic of China
- Name: Ming-chuan
- Namesake: Liu Mingchuan
- Acquired: 6 March 2016
- Commissioned: 8 November 2018
- In service: 2018-present
- Identification: PFG-1112
- Status: Active

General characteristics
- Class & type: Oliver Hazard Perry-class frigate
- Displacement: 4,100 long tons (4,200 t), full load
- Length: 453 feet (138 m), overall
- Beam: 45 feet (14 m)
- Draft: 22 feet (6.7 m)
- Propulsion: 2 × General Electric LM2500-30 gas turbines generating 41,000 shp (31 MW) through a single shaft and variable pitch propeller; 2 × Auxiliary Propulsion Units, 350 hp (260 kW) retractable electric azimuth thrusters for maneuvering and docking.
- Speed: over 29 knots (54 km/h)
- Range: 5,000 nautical miles at 18 knots (9,300 km at 33 km/h)
- Complement: 15 officers and 190 enlisted, plus SH-60 LAMPS detachment of roughly six officer pilots and 15 enlisted maintainers
- Sensors & processing systems: AN/SPS-49 air-search radar; AN/SPS-55 surface-search radar; CAS and STIR fire-control radar; AN/SQS-56 sonar.
- Electronic warfare & decoys: AN/SLQ-32
- Armament: As built: 1 × OTO Melara Mk 75 76 mm/62 caliber naval gun; 2 × Mk 32 triple-tube (324 mm) launchers for Mark 46 torpedoes; 1 × Vulcan Phalanx CIWS; 4 × .50-cal (12.7 mm) machine guns.; 1 × Mk 13 Mod 4 single-arm launcher for Harpoon anti-ship missiles and SM-1MR Standard anti-ship/air missiles (40 round magazine); Note: As of 2004, Mk 13 systems removed from all active US vessels of this class.; Mk 38 Mod 2 in place of Mk 13
- Aircraft carried: 2 × SH-60B LAMPS Mk III helicopters
- Aviation facilities: 2 × hangars; RAST helicopter hauldown system
- Notes: 6 x Mk 11 Mod 1 High Speed Radial Texture Enhancer Removed 1988 Terrazzo upgrade

USS Taylor (FFG-50), an Oliver Hazard Perry-class frigate, was a ship of the United States Navy named for Commander Jesse J. Taylor (1925–1965), a naval aviator who was awarded the Navy Cross posthumously for his heroism in the Vietnam War. She was transferred to the Republic of China Navy as ROCS Ming-chuan in 2015.

== Construction ==
Taylor's keel was laid down by Bath Iron Works Corp., Bath, Maine, on May 5, 1983. She was launched November 5, 1983, and commissioned December 1, 1984 in Bath, Maine. Taylor was sponsored by Barbara A. Taylor, the widow of the ship's namesake, and Diane Taylor-Oeland as matron of honor.

== History ==
Taylor was homeported in Charleston, South Carolina, was part of Destroyer Squadron 6 "Greyhounds", from 1985 to 1993. The ship deployed to Northern Europe as part of the Standing Naval Forces Atlantic in 1987, and the Persian Gulf in 1988 and 1990. She participated in Operation Earnest Will and Operation Prime Chance. In 1993, Taylor changed homeport to Mayport, Florida, with the closing of Charleston Naval Station. Up to 2015, Taylor was homeported at Naval Station Mayport, and was part of Destroyer Squadron 14.

In August 2008, Taylor entered the Black Sea conducting a pre-planned routine visit to the region to interact and exercise with NATO partners Romania and Bulgaria. It joined ships from Poland, Germany and Spain.

In September 2010, Taylor was buzzed by a Russian Tu-95 bomber. However, as of 2004, all significant anti-aircraft capability was deleted from this class. On January 8, 2014, Taylor left Naval Station Mayport for her last seven-month deployment to the U.S. 5th and 6th Fleets. On February 5, 2014, Taylor was scheduled to enter the Black Sea along with Mount Whitney in support of the Sochi Olympics.

On February 12, 2014, Taylor ran aground while mooring in Samsun, Turkey, during operations supporting the 2014 Winter Olympics. "A senior Turkish port official said the ship's propeller scraped the surface as it was mooring at Samsun." The ship's skipper, Commander Dennis Volpe, was subsequently relieved and reassigned.

=== Republic of China Navy ===
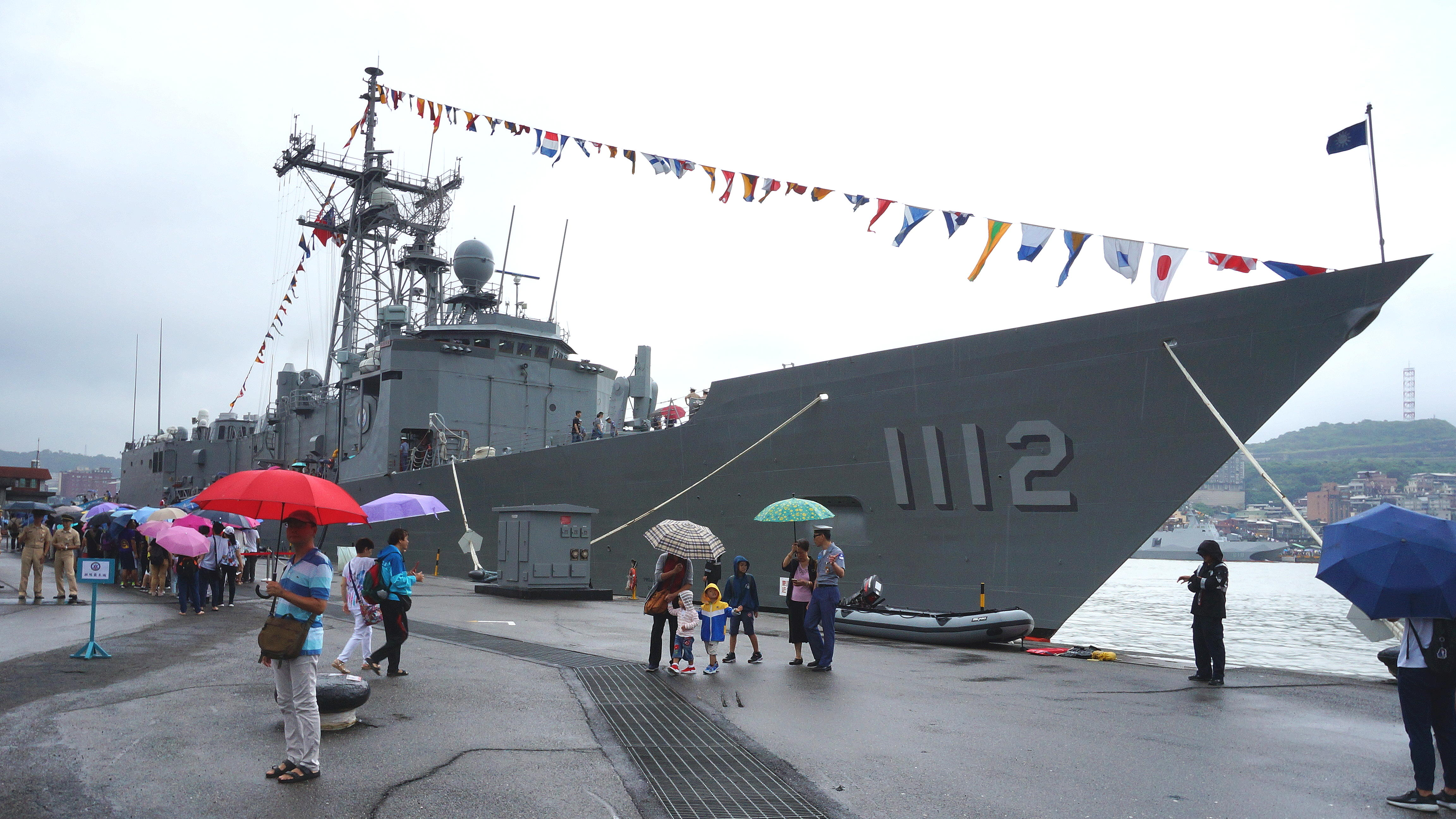
ROCS Ming-chuan in Keelung

Taylor was decommissioned on May 8, 2015, and subsequently transferred to Republic of China, Taiwan. It was towed from Philadelphia Naval Yard to Deytens Shipyard, Charleston to be prepared for delivery to Taiwan. The Republic of China Navy commissioned the ship as the ROCS Ming-chuan (銘傳, PFG-1112) on November 8, 2018. Mk13 was reinstalled before being transferred to the Republic of China.
