= BCHS =

== Organizations ==
BCHS may refer to one of the following organizations:

- Brome County Historical Society, Knowlton, Quebec
- Bronx County Historical Society

BCHS may also refer to one of the following Christian high schools:

- Bakersfield Christian High School in Bakersfield, California
- Brethren Christian Junior/Senior High School in Huntington Beach, California

BCHS may also refer to one of the following Catholic high schools:

- Berks Catholic High School in Reading, Pennsylvania
- Bergen Catholic High School in Oradell, New Jersey
- Bishop Canevin High School in Pittsburgh, Pennsylvania
- Bishop Carroll Catholic High School in Wichita, Kansas
- Bishop Carroll High School (Calgary, Alberta) in Canada
- Bishop Carroll High School (Ebensburg, Pennsylvania)
- Bishop Chatard High School in Indianapolis, Indiana
- Boston College High School in Boston, Massachusetts
- Bourgade Catholic High School in Phoenix, Arizona

BCHS may also refer to one of the following public high schools:

In the United States

- Baker County High School (Newton, Georgia)
- Baker County High School (Glen St. Mary, Florida)
- Baldwin County High School in Bay Minette, Alabama
- Banks County High School in Homer, Georgia
- Barron Collier High School in Naples, Florida
- Barren County High School in Glasgow, Kentucky
- Bath County High School in Owingsville, Kentucky
- Bath County High School (Virginia) in Hot Springs, Virginia
- Bay City High School in Bay City, Texas
- Belle Chasse High School in Belle Chasse, Louisiana
- Benton Central Junior-Senior High School in Fowler, Indiana
- Benton Consolidated High School in Benton, Illinois
- Bethlehem Central High School in Delmar, New York
- Big Creek High School in War, West Virginia
- Bleckley County High School in Cochran, Georgia
- Boca Ciega High School in Gulfport, Florida
- Boulder Creek High School in Anthem, Arizona
- Bradley Central High School in Cleveland, Tennessee
- Brantley County High School in Nahunta, Georgia
- Brookfield Central High School in Brookfield, Wisconsin
- Brookland-Cayce High School in Cayce, South Carolina
- Brooklyn Center High School in Brooklyn Center, Minnesota
- Bryan Collegiate High School in Bryan, Texas
- Burke County High School in Waynesboro, Georgia
- Burlington City High School in Burlington, New Jersey
- Business Careers High School in San Antonio, Texas

Elsewhere

- Baie-Comeau High School in Baie-Comeau, Quebec, Canada
- Brentwood County High School in Brentwood, Essex, England
- Burlington Central High School in Burlington, Ontario, Canada
- Baghdad College High School in Baghdad, Iraq

== Technology ==
- BCHS refers to a Solution stack using OpenBSD, the C programming language, Httpd and SQLite
