= Mike Bell (defensive lineman) =

American football player (born 1957)

No. 99
- Position: Defensive end

Personal information
- Born: August 30, 1957 (age 69); Wichita, Kansas, U.S.
- Listed height: 6 ft 4 in (1.93 m)
- Listed weight: 255 lb (116 kg)

Career information
- High school: Bishop Carroll (Wichita)
- College: Colorado State
- NFL draft: 1979: 1st round, 2nd overall pick

Career history
- Kansas City Chiefs (1979–1991)

Awards and highlights
- Consensus All-American (1978); Second-team All-American (1977); WAC Lineman of the Year (1977)

Career NFL statistics
- Sacks: 52
- Fumble recoveries: 10
- Stats at Pro Football Reference

Mike J. Bell (born August 30, 1957) is an American former professional football player who was a defensive end for twelve seasons in the National Football League (NFL) during the 1970s, 1980s and 1990s. Bell played college football for Colorado State Rams, earning All-American honors. He was the second overall pick in the 1979 NFL draft and played for the NFL's Kansas City Chiefs for his entire professional career.

Bell was born in Wichita, Kansas, where he played multiple sports at Bishop Carroll Catholic High School from 1971 to 1975.

He attended Colorado State University, where he played for the Rams from 1975 to 1978. He was recognized as a consensus first-team All-American as a senior in 1978. His twin brother, Mark, also played for Colorado State. Bell was inducted into the Colorado State University Athletics Hall of Fame in 2001.

The Kansas City Chiefs chose Bell in the first round (second overall pick) in the 1979 NFL Draft, and he played for the Chiefs from 1979 to 1991, playing for four head coaches. During his twelve NFL seasons, he played in 135 games and started 100 of them, compiling 40 quarterback sacks and 10 recovered fumbles.
