= Midwest Magic Jubilee =

Midwest Magic Jubilee is an annual magic convention held in Missouri.

== History ==
The Jubilee was founded in 1956 by the Assembly 8 of St. Louis (the St. Louis chapter of Society of American Magicians (S.A.M.)), and Ring One St. Louis (the St. Louis chapter of International Brotherhood of Magicians (I.B.M.)). It originally switched locations each year from St. Louis to Kansas City, though currently its permanent home is in St. Louis, which is also the headquarters of both S.A.M.'s Assembly 8 and I.B.M.'s Ring One.

== Event ==
The Jubilee hosts between 150 and 250 attendees. It features a mix of magic lectures, demonstrations, and magic stage & close up competitions. Evening magic shows bring in professional magicians from all over North America, and dealers from all over the world.

== Notable attendees ==
The Jubilee was said to have been Dai Vernon's favorite convention, as he attended several times.

Many of the following stars and close-up magicians have appeared at the Jubilee:

- 1957: Bud Dietrich, Joe Scott, Paul LePaul, Gene DeVoe, john Fabjance, Ernie Heldman, Jay Marshall, Senator Crandall, and Brother John Hammon.
- 1960: Gene Devoe, Don Lawton, John Fabjance, and Bev Taylor.
- 1970: Bud Dietrich, Jim Ryan, Roy Mayer, Jay Marshall, John shirley Derek Dingle, Harry Monti, and Harold Russell.
- 1974: Walter Zaney Blaney, Roger Klause, Mike Rogers, and Dai Vernon.
- 1975: Ab Dickson, Johnny Brown, and Father Paul Zipfel.
- 1977: J. B. Bobo, Ken Klosterman, Jim Ryan, Gene Anderson, O'Dowd & Sandra, Brother John Hamman Mike Caveny, and John Cornelius.
- 1978: Dai Vernon, Andre Kole, Joe Cossari, Phil Goldstein (Max Maven), Dan Garrett, Mike Brazill, Jack Chanin, Paul Gertner, Marcom, Joe Palen, and Don James.
- 1979: John Mendoza, David Hoy, J B Bobo, Tom Ogden, David Ginn Larry West El Doveno, Van Cleve, and Slydini.
- 1981: Jay Marshall, Lance Burton, Mac King, Ab Dickson, Sjhintaro Fujiyama, the Great Tomsoni, John Mendoza, and Karrell Fox.
- 1982: Jay Scott Berry, Terry Seabrooke, George Schindler, Jonathon Neal Brown, Mark Kornhauser, Trevor lewis, and Derek Dingle.
- 1983: Mike O'Dowd, Ali Bongo, Glenn Falkenstein, Randi, Marvyn Roy, and Del Ray.
- 1984: Harry Blackstone jr. Mike Ammar, Mark Kornhauser, David Ginn, Roger Miller, Al Goshman, and Howie Schwarzman.
- 1985: Hans Morretti, Jeff McBride, Tom Mullica, Mike Rogers, Marcos, Bob Little, Don Lawton, David Roth, Petrick & Mia, Dave Cresey, and Richard Kaufman.
- 1986: Goldfinger and Dove, Jeff Hobson, and Howard Hale.
- 1987: Dai Vernon, Jay Marshall, Fukai & Kimika, Larry Becker, Kohl & co. Chris Kenner, Michael Ammar, Hiawatha Johnson, Hiawatha Johnson, John Carney, Stan Allen, Don Lawton, Tom Mullica, and Mike Caveney.
- 1989: Jay Marshall, Karari, Brother John Hammon, Tina Lennert, Dana Daniels, Stan Allen, Rocco, Frank Garcia, Meir Yedid, Korari, and Dai Vernon.
- 1991: Don Alan, Jade, Mac King, Michael Weber, Tony Chapek, Jade, Terry Seabrook, Robert Dorian, Chuck Fayne, Joaquin Ayala, and Mark Wilson.
- 1993: Hank Mororehouse, David Roth, Colombini, Jay Scott Berry, John Cornelius, Columbini, Dick Ryan, Jon Racherbaumer, and Terry Evanswood.
- 1995: Satoru Furakawa, David Williamson, Martin Lewis, Justin Willman, and Billy McComb.
- 1997: Kevin James, Pat Page & Alan Shaxon, Jon Racherbaumer, Nick Lewin, Chris Korn, Scotty York, Tom Mullica, and Eddie Fields.
- 1999: John Calvert, Justin willman, Jade, topas, Vito Lupo, Aye Jaye, Bob Little, peter White, and Hank Moorehouse.
- 2002: Dana Daniels, Danny Cole, John Mendoza, Kevin James, Rachel Wild, Diamond Jim Tyler, and Gaeten Bloom.
- 2003: Lee Asher, Tony Miller, Mike Powers, David Sandy, Tom Jones & Rachel wild, Pete Marucci, Max Maven, and Chris KornSimon Lovell.
- 2006: Whit Haydn, Mike Powers, Jason Dean, Jay Sankey, Howie Schwarzman, Julie Sobanski, Tony Miller, and Oscar Munoz.
- 2007: Jason Dean, Michael Finney, Tom Burgoon & David Evangelista, Sterling Steal, Howie Schwarzman, Julie Sobanski, David Solomon, Bill & Ruth Pitts, Sonny Fontana, Mark Mason, and Todd Lamanske.
- 2010: John Calvert
- 2011: Eugene Berger, Paul Gertner, Shawn Farquhar, Simon Lovell, Eric Buss, Andrew Goldenhersh, Richard Turner, Authur Stead, Scott Wells, and Dan Harlan.
- 2012: Losander, Chris Capehart, Chris Randall, Dan Garrett, and Eli.

== Notable jubilee events ==
John Calvert celebrated his 99th birthday at the Jubilee in 2010.

The 50th anniversary Jubilee event took place in August 2006.
