= Jesse J. Taylor =

Posthumous Navy Cross Recipient (1925–1965)

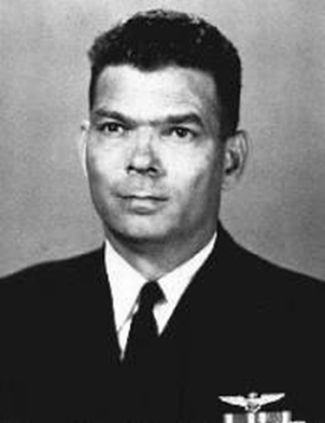
- Jesse J. Taylor
- Born: Jesse Junior Taylor; 16 January 1925; Wichita, Kansas, US
- Died: 17 November 1965 (aged 40) near Haiphong, North Vietnam
- Burial place: Fort Rosecrans National Cemetery
- Military career
- Allegiance: United States of America
- Branch: United States Navy
- Service years: 1942 – 1946; 1951 – 1965
- Rank: Lieutenant commander
- Service number: 553662
- Conflicts: World War II; Vietnam War †
- Awards: Navy Cross

Jesse Junior Taylor (16 January 1925 – 17 November 1965) was a United States Navy naval aviator, Lieutenant Commander during the Vietnam War. He also served as an enlisted man during World War II. He was posthumously awarded the Navy Cross for actions 17 November 1965 over North Vietnam. He was the namesake of USS Taylor.

== Biography ==
Jesse Junior Taylor was born in Wichita, Kansas, on 16 January 1925 to Jesse D. Taylor of Kansas and Mabel Taylor of Nebraska. In 1935 the family lived in the Kansas City area and in 1940 they lived in the Los Angeles metro area. Taylor enlisted in the Navy after high school on 26 October 1942. He joined Bombing Squadron 11 (VB-11) as an aviation radioman and enlisted Naval Aircrewman and was deployed with the squadron to the carrier USS Hornet in September 1944. Over the following four months, VB-11 carried out a highly successful combat tour, flying 490 strike sorties against a variety of enemy targets in the Pacific. Taylor, as an aviation radioman, earned a ribbon for Hornet's Presidential Unit Citation. He served with VB-11 until discharged from the Navy on 5 February 1946.

Following his reentry into civilian life, he attended Long Beach City College for two years before going to work with several private concerns in the Los Angeles area. However, he returned to the college in 1950 and, while there, enlisted in the United States Naval Reserve shortly after Korean War began.

Reporting for duty in January 1951, Taylor underwent flight training as a Naval Aviation Cadet (NAVCAD) and was soon designated a Naval Aviator. Commissioned an ensign in May 1952, he went on to receive further training until he joined Composite Squadron Four (VC-4) in January 1953 as a replacement pilot and Maintenance and Material Officer.

Detached from that duty in July 1955, he then served as Naval Reserve Officers Training Corps (NROTC) instructor on the Los Angeles campus of the University of California. Following that tour, he went to Naval Air Station Pensacola for further flight instruction. The first half of 1956 saw Taylor as a flight instructor at Naval Air Station Whiting Field, Milton, Florida. He then joined the staff of Chief of Naval Air Training at NAS Pensacola as Assistant Aviation Safety Officer.

After his tour in Pensacola, Taylor journeyed to England, where, for a year, he attended the Empire Test Pilots' School at Farmborough. He then rejoined the fleet, serving as a replacement pilot in Fighter Squadron 174 (VF-174). Promoted to lieutenant commander while serving with the squadron, he then attended the Naval War College in Newport, Rhode Island, for one year. Next, he represented the Bureau of Naval Weapons at St. Louis, Missouri, directing the Bureau's Flight Test Division for two years.

=== Vietnam War ===
In July 1965, LCDR Taylor was assigned to Carrier Air Wing 16 aboard the aircraft carrier USS Oriskany, and sailed to the western Pacific. He flew 16 missions between September and November, earning an Air Medal and a gold star in lieu of a second award. Selected for promotion to the rank of commander on 1 September 1965, at the time of his death he had not been officially given the rank.

On 17 November 1965, Commander Taylor was flying his A-1 Skyraider during attacks on a key bridge near the North Vietnamese port of Haiphong. Anti-aircraft fire had downed one of the attacking aircraft and its pilot had ejected from his doomed plane in a densely populated and heavily defended area. Taylor heard the radio transmission about the pilot's plight. Although it was not his assigned mission, realizing that time was of the essence in any attempt to rescue the downed pilot, Taylor made a courageous decision. Having discovered that other rescue aircraft were occupied elsewhere, he took command of the rescue effort.

Despite intense and accurate anti-aircraft fire, Taylor proceeded to the scene and found the downed pilot still in his parachute harness in shallow water. To cover the approach of the rescue helicopter, he attacked the anti-aircraft gun sites, despite the fact that his own plane had sustained damage. The storm of enemy ground fire soon made it obvious that the helicopter would not be able to extricate the man on the ground. Meanwhile, because of fire in his own aircraft, Commander Taylor was forced to break off his own persistent attacks. Rather than try to abandon his plane in enemy territory, he elected to try to ditch in the Gulf of Tonkin. However, the fire burned through the wing of his plane and it crashed before he had time to leave it.

For his heroic determination to save a fellow pilot, even at great risk to his own life, Commander Taylor was posthumously awarded the Navy Cross.

Taylor and his wife Barbara had three children. Taylor's remains were returned by North Vietnam in 1975. He was buried at Fort Rosecrans National Cemetery in San Diego, California.

Taylor is listed on the Vietnam Veterans Memorial wall on Panel 3E, Row 96.

== Navy Cross citation ==
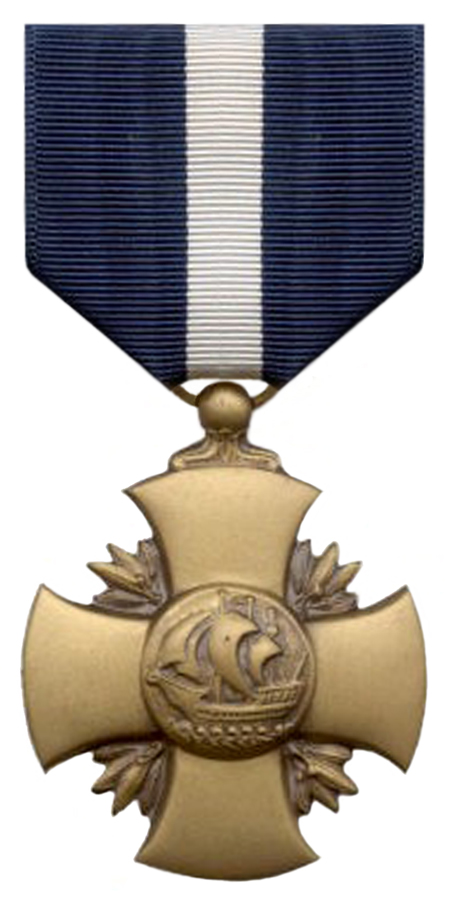
Navy Cross

The Navy Department Board of Decorations and Medals awarded Taylor the Navy Cross for actions while serving aboard Oriskany and for actions over North Vietnam 17 November 1965 with the following citation:

The President of the United States of America takes pride in presenting the Navy Cross (Posthumously) to Lieutenant Commander Jesse Junior Taylor (NSN: 0-553662), United States Navy, for extraordinary heroism in aerial flight as a Pilot in Attack Carrier Air Wing SIXTEEN (CVW-16), embarked in U.S.S. ORISKANY (CVA-34), during a rescue combat air patrol over hostile territory in North Vietnam on 17 November 1965. Although his aircraft was severely damaged by heavy enemy ground fire while he was attempting to locate a downed pilot, Lieutenant Commander Taylor persisted in his efforts until he had definitely ascertained the location of his fellow airman. He then proceeded to attack enemy gun sites which threatened the approach of the rescue helicopter. Only after his aircraft caught fire and a crash was imminent did Lieutenant Commander Taylor cease his efforts. With his aircraft burning and heavily damaged, he succeeded in reaching the coast of the Gulf of Tonkin in an attempt to ditch but did not survive the crash of his crippled aircraft. In sacrificing his life in an effort to save the life of a fellow airman, Lieutenant Commander Taylor displayed the highest degree of courage and self-sacrifice. His actions were in keeping with the finest traditions of the United States Naval Service.

— Navy Department Board of Decorations and Medals)
