= Mark Bell (defensive end) =

American football player (born 1957)

No. 82, 90, 48
- Positions: Defensive end, tight end

Personal information
- Born: August 30, 1957 (age 69); Wichita, Kansas, U.S.
- Listed height: 6 ft 5 in (1.96 m)
- Listed weight: 241 lb (109 kg)

Career information
- High school: Bishop Carroll (Wichita)
- College: Colorado State
- NFL draft: 1979: 4th round, 102nd overall pick

Career history
- Seattle Seahawks (1979–1982); Baltimore/Indianapolis Colts (1983–1984)

Career NFL statistics
- Sacks: 1
- Fumble recoveries: 2
- Receptions: 3
- Receiving yards: 33
- Stats at Pro Football Reference

Mark E. Bell (born August 30, 1957) is an American former professional football player who was a defensive end and tight end for six seasons in the National Football League (NFL). He played college football for the Colorado State Rams.

His twin brother Mike Bell, also played in the NFL and at Colorado State University. His son, Blake Bell, was a quarterback who later moved to tight end for the Oklahoma Sooners. Blake Bell was drafted by the San Francisco 49ers in 2015. Mike and Mark Bell both live in Wichita, Kansas.
