= Bishop Carroll Catholic High School =

Location
- 8101 West Central Avenue; Wichita, Kansas 67212; United States; 37.692742°N 97.436642°W

Information
- School type: Private
- Motto: Unity ∙ Charity ∙ Faithfulness
- Established: 1964
- President: Alan Shuckman
- Principal: Dan Dester
- Chaplain: Fr. Hayden Charles
- Grades: 9 to 12
- Colors: Green; Gold
- Athletics: Class 5A
- Athletics conference: Greater Wichita Athletic League
- Nickname: Golden Eagles
- Rival: Kapaun Mt. Carmel
- Accreditation: North Central Association of Colleges and Schools
- Newspaper: Flyer
- Yearbook: Spectrum
- Website: www.bcchs.org

Bishop Carroll Catholic High School is a private high school located in Wichita, Kansas, United States. It is one of two Catholic high schools in the city, part of the Roman Catholic Diocese of Wichita.

== History ==
Bishop Mark K. Carroll was installed as the bishop of the Roman Catholic Diocese of Wichita on May 6, 1947. He had a dream of establishing the first Catholic boys' high school in the Wichita Diocese. He immediately began to carry out this vision. By September 1962, Bishop Mark Carroll had installed two Catholic boys' high schools, Bishop Carroll being the second. At first, he named the new school Notre Dame High School, but by May 1964, Notre Dame had closed in order for it to be moved to its current location and reopened. The name was then changed to Bishop Mark K. Carroll High School, and classes began on September 8, 1964. Then, in 1971, Bishop Carroll High School merged with Madonna High School, an all-girls school founded by the Sisters Adorers of the Blood of Christ and the Congregation of Sisters of St. Joseph.

== Extracurricular activities ==
The Golden Eagles compete in the Greater Wichita Athletic League and are classified as a 5A school, the second-largest classification in Kansas according to the Kansas State High School Activities Association.

=== Academics ===
Bishop Carroll regularly competes in Debate, Forensics, and Scholar's Bowl. In Scholar's Bowl, Bishop Carroll has won Kansas State High School Activities Association 5A State Championships in 2006, 2007, 2010, 2014 and 2025.

=== Athletics ===
Bishop Carroll is a member of the Kansas State High School Activities Association and competes in the Greater Wichita Athletic League, which consists of the nine high schools in the city of Wichita.

=== Fall ===
- Football
- Volleyball
- Boys Cross-Country
- Girls Cross-Country
- Girls Golf
- Boys Soccer
- Girls Tennis
- Cheerleading
- Dance Team

=== Winter ===
- Boys Basketball
- Girls Basketball
- Wrestling
- Boys Bowling
- Girls Bowling
- Winter Cheerleading
- Boys Swimming/Diving
- Winter Dance Team

=== Spring ===
- Baseball
- Boys Golf
- Boys Tennis
- Girls Soccer
- Girls Swimming/Diving
- Softball
- Boys Track and Field
- Girls Track and Field

== Notable alumni ==
- Blake Bell, NFL player for the Kansas City Chiefs
- Mark Bell, former NFL player for the Seattle Seahawks and Baltimore/Indianapolis Colts
- Mike Bell, former NFL player for the Kansas City Chiefs

== See also ==
- Education in Kansas
- List of high schools in Kansas
