= Larry Polowski =

American football player (born 1957)

No. 50
- Position: Linebacker

Personal information
- Born: September 15, 1957 (age 69); Three Rivers, Michigan, U.S.
- Listed height: 6 ft 3 in (1.91 m)
- Listed weight: 235 lb (107 kg)

Career information
- High school: Yucca Valley (CA)
- College: Boise State
- NFL draft: 1979: 7th round, 169th overall pick

Career history
- Seattle Seahawks (1979)

Career NFL statistics
- Fumble recoveries: 1
- Stats at Pro Football Reference

Larry Polowski (born September 15, 1957) is an American former professional football player who was a linebacker for the Seattle Seahawks of the National Football League (NFL) in 1979. He played college football for the Boise State Broncos.
