= Robert Hardy (American football) =

American football player (born 1956)

No. 75
- Position: Defensive tackle

Personal information
- Born: July 3, 1956 (age 70); Tulsa, Oklahoma, U.S.
- Listed height: 6 ft 2 in (1.88 m)
- Listed weight: 250 lb (113 kg)

Career information
- High school: Booker T. Washington (Tulsa)
- College: Jackson State
- NFL draft: 1979: 10th round, 267th overall pick

Career history
- Seattle Seahawks (1979–1982)

Career NFL statistics
- Sacks: 17
- Fumble recoveries: 3
- Stats at Pro Football Reference

Robert Emmitt Hardy (born July 3, 1956) is an American former professional football player who was a defensive tackle in the National Football League (NFL). He was selected by the Seattle Seahawks in the tenth round of the 1979 NFL draft. He played college football for the Jackson State Tigers.
